= 2019 World Weightlifting Championships – Women's 59 kg =

The women's 59 kg competition at the 2019 World Weightlifting Championships was held on 20 and 21 September 2019.

== Schedule ==
Date	Time	Event
20 September 2019	10:00	Group D
20 September 2019	22:30	Group C
21 September 2019	12:00	Group B
21 September 2019	17:55	Group A

== Medalists ==
Event	Gold		Silver		Bronze	
Snatch	Choe Hyo-sim (PRK)	107 kg	Kuo Hsing-chun (TPE)	106 kg	Chen Guiming (CHN)	101 kg
Clean & Jerk	Kuo Hsing-chun (TPE)	140 kg	Choe Hyo-sim (PRK)	138 kg	Chen Guiming (CHN)	132 kg
Total	Kuo Hsing-chun (TPE)	246 kg	Choe Hyo-sim (PRK)	245 kg	Chen Guiming (CHN)	233 kg

== Records ==
Prior to this competition, the existing world records were as follows.

World Record	Snatch	Kuo Hsing-chun (TPE)	106 kg	Ningbo, China	23 April 2019
World Record	Clean & Jerk	Kuo Hsing-chun (TPE)	137 kg	Ningbo, China	23 April 2019
World Record	Total	Kuo Hsing-chun (TPE)	243 kg	Ningbo, China	23 April 2019

== Results ==
Rank	Athlete	Group	Snatch (kg)				Clean & Jerk (kg)				Total
Rank	Athlete	Group	1	2	3	Rank	1	2	3	Rank	Total
1st place, gold medalist(s)	Kuo Hsing-chun (TPE)	A	103	~~106~~	106	2nd place, silver medalist(s)	133	137	140	1st place, gold medalist(s)	246
2nd place, silver medalist(s)	Choe Hyo-sim (PRK)	A	100	104	107	1st place, gold medalist(s)	130	135	138	2nd place, silver medalist(s)	245
3rd place, bronze medalist(s)	Chen Guiming (CHN)	A	97	101	~~103~~	3rd place, bronze medalist(s)	127	132	~~138~~	3rd place, bronze medalist(s)	233
4	Rosivé Silgado (COL)	A	93	96	~~98~~	6	121	126	~~128~~	4	222
5	Mikiko Ando (JPN)	A	93	96	~~98~~	7	123	126	~~128~~	5	222
6	Zoe Smith (GBR)	A	93	~~96~~	~~96~~	12	119	~~123~~	123	6	216
7	Yusleidy Figueroa (VEN)	B	90	93	~~95~~	10	120	~~122~~	122	7	215
8	Rebeka Koha (LAT)	A	92	95	97	4	112	115	118	12	215
9	Hoàng Thị Duyên (VIE)	B	~~96~~	~~96~~	96	5	112	115	118	10	214
10	Janeth Gómez (MEX)	A	92	95	~~98~~	9	114	118	~~121~~	11	213
11	Quisia Guicho (MEX)	B	89	91	~~93~~	16	118	~~122~~	~~123~~	9	209
12	Dora Tchakounté (FRA)	B	88	92	~~96~~	13	~~110~~	110	114	14	206
13	Alexandra Escobar (ECU)	C	85	87	90	17	105	110	115	13	205
14	Izabella Yaylyan (ARM)	B	~~88~~	88	92	14	110	~~114~~	~~115~~	15	202
15	Kim So-hwa (KOR)	B	89	~~92~~	92	15	109	~~112~~	~~112~~	17	201
16	Hunter Elam (USA)	B	90	~~93~~	~~93~~	18	~~110~~	110	~~114~~	16	200
17	Maria Grazia Alemanno (ITA)	B	90	92	93	11	105	~~110~~	~~110~~	22	198
18	Tali Darsigny (CAN)	B	89	~~92~~	~~92~~	19	~~108~~	~~108~~	108	18	197
19	Ine Andersson (NOR)	C	82	85	87	20	103	106	~~110~~	19	193
20	Jessica Lucero (USA)	B	~~86~~	~~86~~	86	22	101	105	~~108~~	23	191
21	Sol Anette Waaler (NOR)	C	~~82~~	~~82~~	82	26	105	~~107~~	~~107~~	21	187
22	Saara Leskinen (FIN)	B	~~86~~	86	~~89~~	21	101	~~107~~	~~107~~	27	187
23	Erika Yamasaki (AUS)	C	80	~~83~~	~~83~~	29	102	~~106~~	106	20	186
24	Johanni Taljaard (RSA)	C	~~83~~	84	~~88~~	23	~~100~~	101	~~104~~	26	185
25	Þuríður Helgadóttir (ISL)	D	72	75	80	27	95	101	103	24	183
26	Olivia Blatch (GBR)	C	80	~~82~~	82	25	101	~~104~~	~~104~~	25	183
27	Amalie Løvind (DEN)	C	79	82	~~85~~	24	100	~~104~~	~~104~~	31	182
28	Jenly Tegu Wini (SOL)	C	80	~~82~~	—	28	100	~~104~~	—	29	180
29	Margaret Colonia (PHI)	C	73	77	80	30	100	~~105~~	~~105~~	30	180
30	Marceeta Marlyne Marcus (MAS)	D	~~70~~	70	73	32	95	100	~~102~~	28	173
31	Jacinta Sumagaysay (GUM)	D	65	70	~~73~~	34	85	90	95	32	165
32	Scheila Meister (SUI)	D	70	~~74~~	74	31	83	87	~~92~~	33	161
33	Ivana Gorišek (CRO)	D	~~70~~	~~71~~	71	33	81	~~83~~	84	35	155
34	Dayanara Calma (GUM)	D	~~66~~	~~66~~	66	35	85	~~88~~	~~90~~	34	151
35	Magdeline Moyengwa (BOT)	D	65	~~68~~	~~68~~	36	~~82~~	~~82~~	82	36	147
—	María Lobón (COL)	A	95	~~98~~	~~98~~	8	~~120~~	~~120~~	~~120~~	—	—
—	Boyanka Kostova (AZE)	A	~~103~~	~~103~~	~~103~~	—	120	~~125~~	—	8	—

== New records ==
Snatch	107 kg	Choe Hyo-sim (PRK)	WR
Clean & Jerk	138 kg	Choe Hyo-sim (PRK)	WR
Clean & Jerk	140 kg	Kuo Hsing-chun (TPE)	WR
Total	245 kg	Choe Hyo-sim (PRK)	WR
Total	246 kg	Kuo Hsing-chun (TPE)	WR
