= 2018 World Weightlifting Championships – Women's 59 kg =

The women's 59 kilograms competition at the 2018 World Weightlifting Championships was held on 3–4 November 2018.

== Schedule ==
Date	Time	Event
3 November 2018	22:00	Group C
4 November 2018	12:00	Group B
4 November 2018	17:25	Group A

== Medalists ==
Event	Gold		Silver		Bronze	
Snatch	Kuo Hsing-chun (TPE)	105 kg	Hoàng Thị Duyên (VIE)	103 kg	Rebeka Koha (LAT)	103 kg
Clean & Jerk	Chen Guiming (CHN)	133 kg	Kuo Hsing-chun (TPE)	132 kg	Mikiko Ando (JPN)	131 kg
Total	Kuo Hsing-chun (TPE)	237 kg	Chen Guiming (CHN)	231 kg	Rebeka Koha (LAT)	227 kg

== Records ==
Prior to this competition, the existing world records were as follows.

World Record	Snatch	World Standard	104 kg	—	1 November 2018
World Record	Clean & Jerk	World Standard	131 kg	—	1 November 2018
World Record	Total	World Standard	232 kg	—	1 November 2018

== Results ==
Rank	Athlete	Group	Snatch (kg)				Clean & Jerk (kg)				Total
Rank	Athlete	Group	1	2	3	Rank	1	2	3	Rank	Total
1st place, gold medalist(s)	Kuo Hsing-chun (TPE)	A	100	103	105	1st place, gold medalist(s)	128	~~132~~	132	2nd place, silver medalist(s)	237
2nd place, silver medalist(s)	Chen Guiming (CHN)	A	98	~~103~~	~~103~~	5	130	133	~~140~~	1st place, gold medalist(s)	231
3rd place, bronze medalist(s)	Rebeka Koha (LAT)	A	98	~~102~~	103	3rd place, bronze medalist(s)	117	121	124	6	227
4	Pimsiri Sirikaew (THA)	A	~~100~~	100	~~104~~	4	121	125	~~128~~	5	225
5	Mikiko Ando (JPN)	A	93	~~97~~	~~97~~	11	124	127	131	3rd place, bronze medalist(s)	224
6	Hoàng Thị Duyên (VIE)	B	95	100	103	2nd place, silver medalist(s)	113	117	120	7	223
7	Chinenye Fidelis (NGR)	C	80	85	90	14	115	120	125	4	215
8	Acchedya Jagaddhita (INA)	A	~~93~~	93	96	6	112	116	~~118~~	9	212
9	Izabella Yaylyan (ARM)	A	~~90~~	90	95	10	110	115	~~118~~	10	210
10	Quisia Guicho (MEX)	A	88	~~91~~	~~91~~	19	118	~~122~~	~~126~~	8	206
11	Saule Saduakassova (KAZ)	A	85	90	~~93~~	16	~~112~~	112	115	11	205
12	Jessica Lucero (USA)	B	~~88~~	88	91	13	109	113	~~117~~	12	204
13	Dora Tchakounté (FRA)	B	88	92	95	8	105	108	~~110~~	19	203
14	Olga Te (RUS)	B	90	95	~~98~~	7	105	~~108~~	108	20	203
15	Tali Darsigny (CAN)	C	86	89	91	12	106	111	~~113~~	13	202
16	Sabine Kusterer (GER)	B	87	89	~~91~~	18	106	~~109~~	109	16	198
17	Maria Grazia Alemanno (ITA)	A	88	90	~~92~~	17	108	~~110~~	~~110~~	21	198
18	Ham Eun-ji (KOR)	B	82	86	~~89~~	20	111	~~117~~	~~117~~	14	197
19	Ayşegül Çakın (TUR)	B	82	~~86~~	86	21	~~110~~	110	~~113~~	15	196
20	Yuderqui Contreras (DOM)	B	86	88	90	15	105	~~109~~	~~109~~	26	195
21	Carolina Lugo (MEX)	B	85	~~88~~	~~88~~	22	108	~~112~~	~~112~~	18	193
22	Seo Jeong-mi (KOR)	B	85	~~90~~	~~90~~	23	105	~~110~~	~~110~~	25	190
23	Angelica Roos (SWE)	B	80	82	~~84~~	27	103	~~106~~	106	22	188
24	Mouna Skandi (ESP)	C	79	82	~~84~~	24	100	103	105	24	187
25	Marianne Saarhelo (FIN)	C	80	82	~~85~~	25	98	102	~~104~~	28	184
26	Þuríður Helgadóttir (ISL)	C	79	~~83~~	~~83~~	29	99	102	105	23	184
27	Amalie Løvind (DEN)	C	77	80	82	26	97	100	~~102~~	30	182
28	Gilyeliz Guzmán (PUR)	C	74	79	~~83~~	30	93	98	103	27	182
29	Darya Tseveleva (BLR)	C	75	~~80~~	~~80~~	31	95	100	—	29	175
30	Sarit Kalo (ISR)	C	~~73~~	~~73~~	73	32	92	95	~~98~~	31	168
31	Nastasja Štesl (SLO)	C	68	72	~~75~~	33	88	~~91~~	~~92~~	32	160
—	Natalia Khlestkina (RUS)	A	90	95	~~99~~	9	—	—	—	—	—
—	Ine Andersson (NOR)	C	77	80	~~82~~	28	~~102~~	~~102~~	~~102~~	—	—
—	Flavia Reyes (PUR)	C	~~82~~	~~82~~	~~82~~	—	108	~~115~~	~~115~~	17	—

== New records ==
Snatch	105 kg	Kuo Hsing-chun (TPE)	WR
Clean & Jerk	132 kg	Kuo Hsing-chun (TPE)	WR
Clean & Jerk	133 kg	Chen Guiming (CHN)	WR
Total	233 kg	Kuo Hsing-chun (TPE)	WR
Total	237 kg	Kuo Hsing-chun (TPE)	WR
