= Kuo Hsing-chun =

Taiwanese weightlifter (born 1993)

Kuo Hsing-chun (Tana)
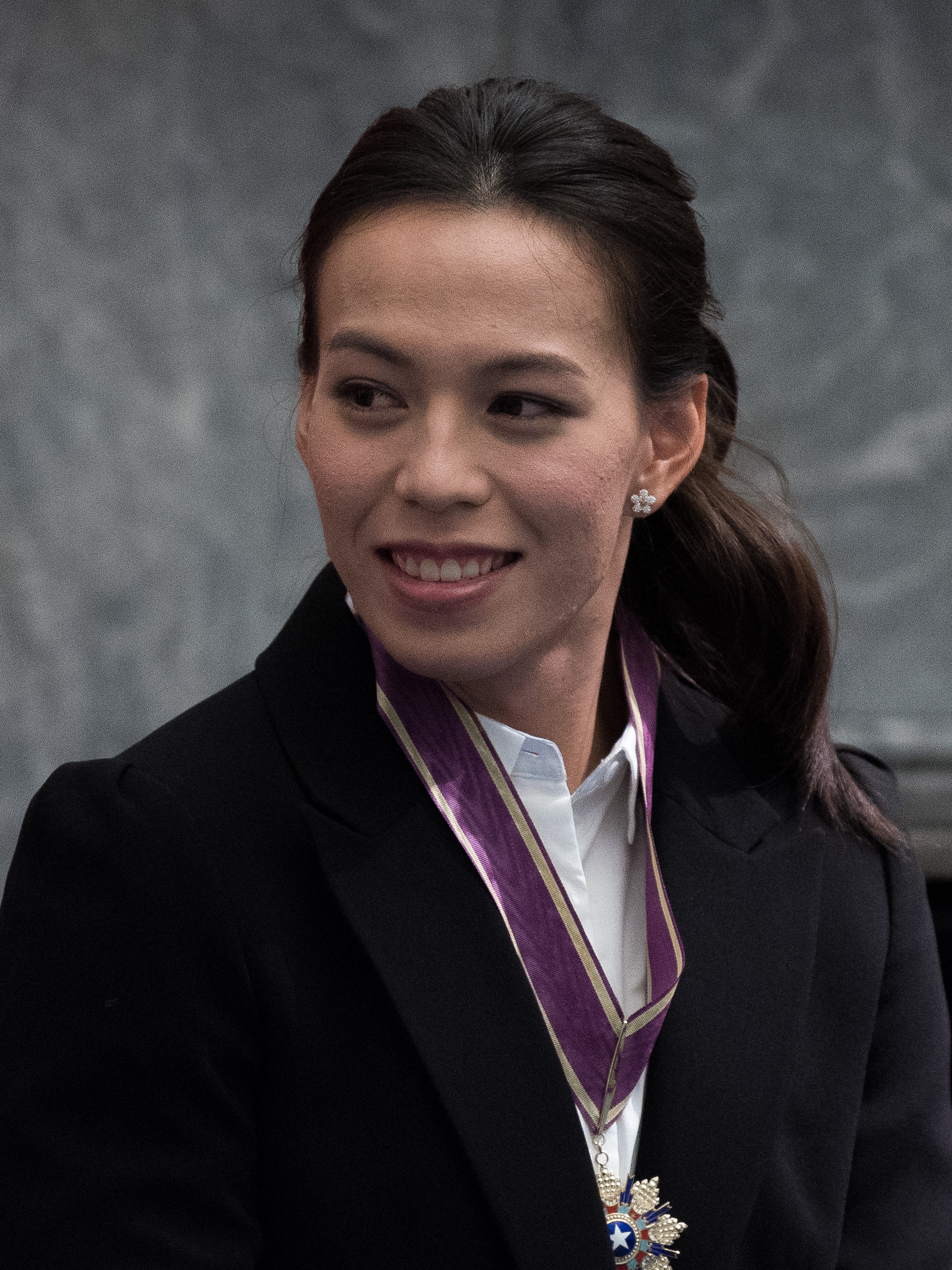
- Kuo in 2017

Personal information
- National team: Taiwan
- Born: 26 November 1993 (age 32) Yilan, Taiwan
- Years active: 2011–
- Height: 1.55 m (5 ft 1 in)
- Weight: 58.55 kg (129 lb)

Sport
- Country: Taiwan
- Sport: Weightlifting
- Events: 58 kg (2011–2018), 59 kg (2018–)
- Club: Fu Jen Catholic University

Achievements and titles
- Personal bests: Snatch: 110 kg (2021); Clean and jerk: 142 kg (2017); Total: 249 kg (2017)
Medal record
Women's Weightlifting
Representing Chinese Taipei
Olympic Games
Gold medal – first place	2020 Tokyo	–59 kg
Bronze medal – third place	2016 Rio de Janeiro	–58 kg
Bronze medal – third place	2024 Paris	–59 kg
World Championships
Gold medal – first place	2013 Wrocław	–58 kg
Gold medal – first place	2017 Anaheim	–58 kg
Gold medal – first place	2018 Ashgabat	–59 kg
Gold medal – first place	2019 Pattaya	–59 kg
Gold medal – first place	2021 Tashkent	–59 kg
Silver medal – second place	2022 Bogotá	–59 kg
Bronze medal – third place	2015 Houston	–58 kg
Bronze medal – third place	2025 Førde	–58 kg
Asian Games
Gold medal – first place	2018 Jakarta-Palembang	–58 kg
Bronze medal – third place	2022 Hangzhou	–59 kg
Bronze medal – third place	2026 Aichi–Nagoya	–61 kg
Summer Universiade
Gold medal – first place	2013 Kazan	–58 kg
Gold medal – first place	2017 Taipei	58 kg
Asian Championships
Gold medal – first place	2013 Astana	–58 kg
Gold medal – first place	2016 Tashkent	–58 kg
Gold medal – first place	2017 Ashgabat	–58 kg
Gold medal – first place	2019 Ningbo	–59 kg
Gold medal – first place	2020 Tashkent	–59 kg
Silver medal – second place	2012 Pyeongtaek	–58 kg
Bronze medal – third place	2023 Jinju	–59 kg
Bronze medal – third place	2025 Jiangshan	–59 kg
Youth Olympic Games
Silver medal – second place	2010 Singapore	–53 kg

Kuo Hsing-chun (Chinese: 郭婞淳; pinyin: Guō Xìngchún; Amis name: Tana; born 26 November 1993) is a Taiwanese Amis weightlifter, Olympic gold medalist, five time world champion, two time Universiade champion, Asian Games champion, and five time Asian champion, competing in the 58 kg division until 2018 and 59 kg starting in 2018 after the International Weightlifting Federation reorganized the categories. She has set 11 senior world records in her career.

== Early life ==
Kuo was born in Yilan in 1993. She never knew her biological father, and was raised primarily by her grandmother, as her mother was frequently working. Kuo's given name, Hsing-chun, alludes to the difficult circumstances of her birth, as it sounds similar to hsing tsun (倖存), which means to have survived by luck or accident in Mandarin. When Kuo was born, her umbilical cord wound itself around her neck. In addition, her mother was in labor for over ten hours. The family moved repeatedly, living with several different relatives. Kuo began lifting weights in junior high school, and played a number of sports, including basketball, track and field, and soccer. She chose to specialize in weightlifting in high school. She attended the Affiliated Physical Education Senior High School of National Taitung University.

== Career ==
=== Olympics ===
In 2012, she competed at the 2012 Summer Olympics in the women's 58 kg category and placed sixth overall.

At the 2016 Summer Olympics, she competed in the 58 kg category. In the snatch portion of the competition, she completed her first lift of 102 kg, but was unable to complete her last two lifts of 105 kg. Going into the clean and jerk portion of the competition, she was in third place, as she was 8 kg behind Sukanya Srisurat and tied in weight with Pimsiri Sirikaew (Pimsiri Sirikaew weighed .46 kg less). In the clean and jerk portion, she completed a 129 kg lift which secured her at least a bronze medal finish. For her final lift, she attempted an Olympic record lift of 139 kg, which would put her in first place, but was unable to lift it. She won a bronze medal with a total of 231 kg.

In 2021, she won a gold medal and broke three Olympic records in the women's 59 kg weightlifting competition at the 2020 Summer Olympics in Tokyo. She won the bronze medal in the women's 59 kg event at the 2024 Summer Olympics in Paris, France.

=== World Championships ===
In 2013, she competed at the 2013 World Weightlifting Championships in the 58 kg category. After the snatch portion of the competition she was in second place behind Deng Wei, they both had lifted 108 kg, but Deng Wei was 0.46 kg lighter. In the clean and jerk portion of the competition, she lifted 133 kg in her first attempt, after Deng Wei was unable to complete any of her clean and jerks, she had the gold medal secured. Her total of 241 kg was a full 13 kg over the silver medalist Alexandra Escobar.

The 2015 World Weightlifting Championships was her first competition back from a disappointing year (due to injury), and she competed in the 58 kg category. After the snatch portion of the competition, she was in fourth place with 103 kg, the leader Boyanka Kostova set a world record in the snatch with 112 kg. In the clean and jerk portion, she lifted 133 kg with her final lift securing a bronze medal in the clean and jerk and in the total.

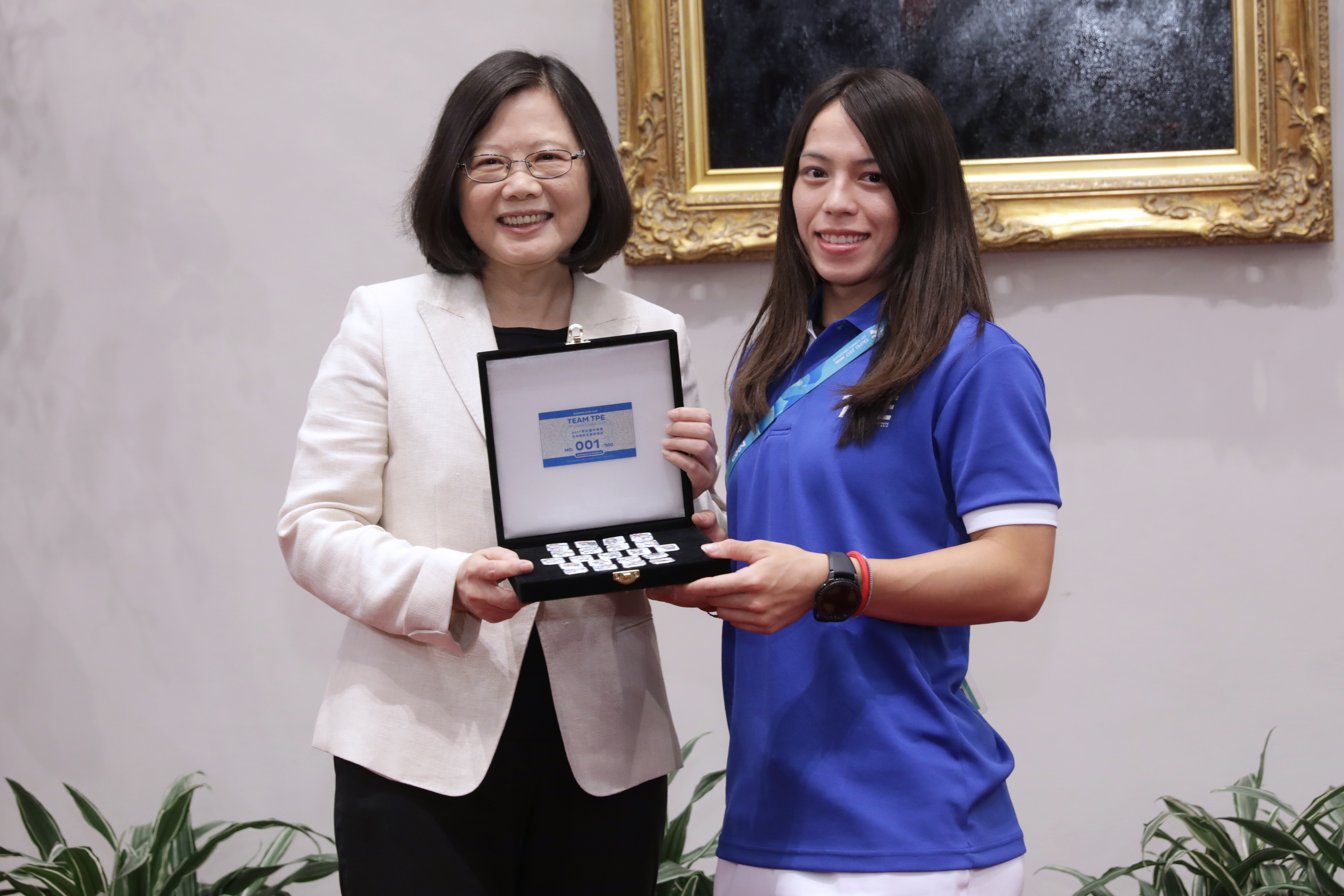
Kuo (right) accepting souvenirs from President Tsai Ing-wen in August 2017

Coming into the 2017 World Weightlifting Championships, she was expected to put up a solid performance after her record-setting performance at the 2017 Summer Universiade. She competed in the 58 kg category, against the reigning Olympic Champion Sukanya Srisurat and it was expected to be a close competition. After the snatch portion, Sukanya Srisurat was in the gold medal position with 105 kg, Kuo also lifted the same, but Srisurat had lifted the weight first. In the clean and jerk portion, Sukanya Srisurat had completed all of her attempts before Kuo had attempted any of her lifts. She made her first lift of 126 kg, securing the gold medal. She added onto that total, lifting 135 kg in the clean and jerk, finishing with 240 kg, a full 15 kg more than reigning Olympic Champion, and silver medalist Srisurat.

In 2018, the International Weightlifting Federation reorganized the categories, and Kuo competed at the 2018 World Weightlifting Championships in the new 59 kg category. In the snatch portion, she lifted a new world record of 105 kg, and led going into the clean and jerk portion by 2 kg over the silver medalist Hoàng Thị Duyên and bronze medallist Rebeka Koha. During the clean and jerk portion, she successfully lifted 128 kg in her first attempt, setting a new world record in the total. With her last successful lift of 132 kg she set a new world record in the clean and jerk and total. Chen Guiming, the eventual silver medalist attempted a world record lift of 140 kg, which would have given her the lead, but she was unable to lift it. As a result, Kuo won the gold medal in the total. She set four senior world records in the competition and won her third World Championships.

Kuo competed in the 2019 World Weightlifting Championships, where she broke two of her own world records in the women's 59 kg category, with 140 kg in the clean and jerk, and 246 kg in the combined lift.

In 2021, she won the gold medal in the women's 59 kg event at the 2021 World Weightlifting Championships held in Tashkent, Uzbekistan. She won the silver medal in the women's 59 kg event at the 2022 World Weightlifting Championships held in Bogotá, Colombia. In 2023, she won the silver medal in the women's 59 kg Clean & Jerk event at the World Weightlifting Championships held in Riyadh, Saudi Arabia.

=== Asian Games ===
Before the 2014 Asian Games, she suffered an injury to her leg, which left her unable to walk for a month; as a result of the injury she donated an ambulance to Taitung hospital. Injury notwithstanding, she went on to place fourth at the 2014 Asian Games in the 58 kg category.

She was the flag bearer for Taiwan at the 2018 Asian Games where she competed in the 58 kg category. After the snatch portion of the competition she led Sukanya Srisurat by 2 kg with 105 kg. In the clean and jerk portion of the competition she secured the gold medal with her first lift of 125 kg, her next attempt was called at 133 kg, but there was an error loading the bar and only 130.5 kg was put on, she made the lift with a lopsided bar (one side weighed 2.5 kg more than the other) and received credit for 130 kg. Her last attempt in the clean and jerk was for a world record weight of 143 kg but she was unable to make the lift.

=== Universiade ===
Kuo won gold at the 2017 Summer Universiade and set a world record of 142 kg for the clean and jerk in her final lift. Following her performance at the Universiade, Kuo was awarded the Order of Brilliant Star, and chose to donate her winnings, totaling NT$1.9 million ($68022.34), back to her community.

=== Asian Weightlifting Championships ===
Kuo competed at the 2019 Asian Weightlifting Championships in the 59 kg category. After her second successful lift of 103 kg, she had secured a gold medal in the snatch, and attempted a world record lift of 106 kg which she successfully completed. In the clean and jerk portion, she had a gold medal in the total virtually guaranteed with her second lift of 134 kg, this gave her a new world record total of 240 kg. Her last attempt of 137 kg broke the clean and jerk world record, and the total world record she had just set. Chen Guiming attempted a 138 kg clean and jerk, but was unable to complete the lift which gave Chen a silver medal in the total, a full 10 kg behind gold medalist Kuo.

== Major results ==
Year	Venue	Weight	Snatch (kg)				Clean and jerk (kg)				Total	Rank
Year	Venue	Weight	1	2	3	Rank	1	2	3	Rank	Total	Rank
Olympic Games
2012	London, Great Britain	58 kg	99	~~101~~	~~102~~	—N/a	129	~~133~~	~~133~~	—N/a	228	6
2016	Rio de Janeiro, Brazil	58 kg	102	~~105~~	~~105~~	—N/a	~~129~~	129	~~139~~	—N/a	231	3rd place, bronze medalist(s)
2021	Tokyo, Japan	59 kg	100	~~103~~	103 OR	—N/a	125	133 OR	~~141~~	—N/a	236 OR	1st place, gold medalist(s)
2024	Paris, France	59 kg	103	~~105~~	105	—N/a	~~130~~	130	~~137~~	—N/a	235	3rd place, bronze medalist(s)
World Championships
2011	Paris, France	58 kg	90	94	~~96~~	11	118	~~122~~	~~122~~	8	212	10
2013	Wrocław, Poland	58 kg	103	106	108	2nd place, silver medalist(s)	133	~~136~~	~~136~~	1st place, gold medalist(s)	241	1st place, gold medalist(s)
2014	Almaty, Kazakhstan	58 kg	~~98~~	98	~~100~~	6	125	~~129~~	~~131~~	5	223	5
2015	Houston, United States	58 kg	104	~~107~~	~~107~~	4	~~133~~	~~133~~	133	3rd place, bronze medalist(s)	237	3rd place, bronze medalist(s)
2017	Anaheim, United States	58 kg	99	102	105	2nd place, silver medalist(s)	126	131	135	1st place, gold medalist(s)	240	1st place, gold medalist(s)
2018	Ashgabat, Turkmenistan	59 kg	100	103	105 WR	1st place, gold medalist(s)	128	~~132~~	132 WR	2nd place, silver medalist(s)	237 WR	1st place, gold medalist(s)
2019	Pattaya, Thailand	59 kg	103	~~106~~	106	2nd place, silver medalist(s)	133	137	140 CWR	1st place, gold medalist(s)	246 WR	1st place, gold medalist(s)
2021	Tashkent, Uzbekistan	59 kg	97	100	~~102~~	2nd place, silver medalist(s)	125	128	130	1st place, gold medalist(s)	230	1st place, gold medalist(s)
2022	Bogotá, Colombia	59 kg	100	~~102~~	102	4	126	~~129~~	130	2nd place, silver medalist(s)	232	2nd place, silver medalist(s)
2023	Riyadh, Saudi Arabia	59 kg	95	98	101	4	120	125	130	2nd place, silver medalist(s)	231	4
2025	Førde, Norway	58 kg	94	96	~~98~~	5	~~124~~	125	128	3rd place, bronze medalist(s)	224	3rd place, bronze medalist(s)
2026	Ningbo, China	61 kg	100	102	104	7	130	133	137	4	241	4
IWF World Cup
2019	Tianjin, China	64 kg	100	103	105	2nd place, silver medalist(s)	130	135	141	1st place, gold medalist(s)	246	2nd place, silver medalist(s)
2024	Phuket, Thailand	59 kg	98	100	~~102~~	10	125	130	—	4	230	5
Asian Games
2014	Incheon, South Korea	58 kg	~~95~~	95	~~98~~	—N/a	120	124	~~128~~	—N/a	219	4
2018	Jakarta, Indonesia	58 kg	100	103	105	—N/a	125	130	~~143~~	—N/a	235	1st place, gold medalist(s)
2023	Hangzhou, China	59 kg	97	99	101	—N/a	122	126	~~128~~	—N/a	227	3rd place, bronze medalist(s)
Summer Universiade
2013	Kazan, Russia	58 kg	100	102	104	—N/a	126	130	134	—N/a	238	1st place, gold medalist(s)
2017	New Taipei, Taiwan	58 kg	102	105	107	—N/a	133	136	142 WR	—N/a	249	1st place, gold medalist(s)
Asian Championships
2012	Pyeongtaek, South Korea	58 kg	94	~~98~~	98	2nd place, silver medalist(s)	123	128	130	2nd place, silver medalist(s)	228	2nd place, silver medalist(s)
2013	Astana, Kazakhstan	58 kg	102	~~105~~	~~105~~	3rd place, bronze medalist(s)	131	~~134~~	134	1st place, gold medalist(s)	236	1st place, gold medalist(s)
2016	Tashkent, Uzbekistan	58 kg	97	100	103	2nd place, silver medalist(s)	128	131	135	1st place, gold medalist(s)	238	1st place, gold medalist(s)
2017	Ashgabat, Turkmenistan	58 kg	98	101	104	1st place, gold medalist(s)	128	133	137	1st place, gold medalist(s)	241	1st place, gold medalist(s)
2019	Ningbo, China	59 kg	100	103	106 WR	1st place, gold medalist(s)	130	134	137 WR	1st place, gold medalist(s)	243 WR	1st place, gold medalist(s)
2021	Tashkent, Uzbekistan	59 kg	105	107	110 WR	1st place, gold medalist(s)	~~133~~	133	137	1st place, gold medalist(s)	247 WR	1st place, gold medalist(s)
2023	Jinju, South Korea	59 kg	98	100	102	3	128	~~132~~	~~135~~	3rd place, bronze medalist(s)	230	3rd place, bronze medalist(s)
2025	Jiangshan, China	59 kg	95	~~98~~	~~98~~	5	120	~~125~~	125	3rd place, bronze medalist(s)	220	3rd place, bronze medalist(s)
Youth Olympic Games
2010	Singapore, Singapore	53 kg	72	75	77	—N/a	90	95	97	—N/a	174	2nd place, silver medalist(s)

- CWR: Current world record
- WR: World record

== See also ==
- Sport in Taiwan
- List of flag bearers for Chinese Taipei at the Olympics

Olympic Games
Preceded by Wong I-sheau	Flagbearer for Chinese Taipei (with Lu Yen-hsun); Tokyo 2020	Succeeded by Incumbent
