= 2022 World Weightlifting Championships – Women's 59 kg =

The women's 59 kilograms competition at the 2022 World Weightlifting Championships was held on 7 and 8 December 2022.

== Schedule ==
Date	Time	Event
7 December 2022	21:30	Group E
8 December 2022	09:00	Group D
8 December 2022	11:30	Group C
8 December 2022	16:30	Group B
8 December 2022	19:00	Group A

== Medalists ==
Event	Gold		Silver		Bronze	
Snatch	Luo Xiaomin (CHN)	103 kg	Maude Charron (CAN)	103 kg	Kamila Konotop (UKR)	102 kg
Clean & Jerk	Yenny Álvarez (COL)	133 kg	Kuo Hsing-chun (TPE)	130 kg	Luo Shifang (CHN)	129 kg
Total	Yenny Álvarez (COL)	234 kg	Kuo Hsing-chun (TPE)	232 kg	Maude Charron (CAN)	231 kg

== Records ==
Prior to this competition, the existing world records were as follows.

World Record	Snatch	Kuo Hsing-chun (TPE)	110 kg	Tashkent, Uzbekistan	19 April 2021
World Record	Clean & Jerk	Kuo Hsing-chun (TPE)	140 kg	Pattaya, Thailand	21 September 2019
World Record	Total	Kuo Hsing-chun (TPE)	247 kg	Tashkent, Uzbekistan	19 April 2021

== Results ==
Rank	Athlete	Group	Snatch (kg)				Clean & Jerk (kg)				Total
Rank	Athlete	Group	1	2	3	Rank	1	2	3	Rank	Total
1st place, gold medalist(s)	Yenny Álvarez (COL)	A	98	101	~~104~~	6	128	131	133	1st place, gold medalist(s)	234
2nd place, silver medalist(s)	Kuo Hsing-chun (TPE)	A	100	~~102~~	102	4	126	~~129~~	130	2nd place, silver medalist(s)	232
3rd place, bronze medalist(s)	Maude Charron (CAN)	A	~~100~~	100	103	2nd place, silver medalist(s)	123	~~127~~	128	4	231
4	Luo Shifang (CHN)	A	101	~~104~~	~~104~~	5	126	129	~~133~~	3rd place, bronze medalist(s)	230
5	Luo Xiaomin (CHN)	A	97	100	103	1st place, gold medalist(s)	122	126	~~129~~	5	229
6	Kamila Konotop (UKR)	A	98	~~101~~	102	3rd place, bronze medalist(s)	116	119	121	8	223
7	Taylor Wilkins (USA)	B	92	95	~~97~~	12	117	~~122~~	122	6	217
8	Concepción Úsuga (COL)	A	~~95~~	95	~~100~~	13	117	122	~~125~~	7	217
9	Dora Tchakounté (FRA)	A	~~96~~	96	~~99~~	10	115	120	~~122~~	10	216
10	Janeth Gómez (MEX)	A	92	94	96	11	114	118	~~122~~	13	214
11	Seo Jeong-mi (KOR)	B	90	~~95~~	96	9	112	116	~~118~~	15	212
12	Anyelin Venegas (VEN)	B	90	93	~~95~~	16	~~118~~	~~118~~	118	12	211
13	Mikiko Andoh (JPN)	B	90	~~95~~	~~95~~	22	120	~~124~~	~~125~~	9	210
14	Daphne Guillén (MEX)	B	90	94	~~97~~	14	115	~~121~~	~~122~~	17	209
15	Ine Andersson (NOR)	B	~~88~~	88	90	23	116	~~119~~	~~119~~	14	206
16	Suratwadee Yodsarn (THA)	D	83	86	~~88~~	32	113	115	119	11	205
17	Riri Endo (JPN)	C	90	92	~~93~~	17	110	113	~~116~~	23	205
18	Izabella Yaylyan (ARM)	B	~~90~~	~~90~~	90	24	110	~~115~~	115	19	205
19	María Casadevall (ARG)	B	90	~~93~~	~~93~~	21	113	~~117~~	~~117~~	24	203
20	Natasya Beteyob (INA)	C	~~87~~	87	90	20	112	~~117~~	~~117~~	25	202
21	Saara Retulainen (FIN)	B	88	~~91~~	~~91~~	27	110	114	~~116~~	21	202
22	Quàng Thị Tâm (VIE)	C	~~93~~	~~93~~	93	15	108	~~112~~	~~112~~	28	201
23	Nelly (INA)	C	85	88	91	18	110	~~115~~	~~115~~	26	201
24	Nathalia Novas (DOM)	B	~~85~~	85	~~90~~	35	112	116	~~119~~	16	201
25	Bindyarani Devi (IND)	D	83	86	~~88~~	31	~~112~~	~~112~~	114	20	200
26	Gilyeliz Guzmán (PUR)	C	~~87~~	~~87~~	87	30	113	~~116~~	~~116~~	22	200
27	Jenifer Becerra (ECU)	D	86	90	~~92~~	19	108	~~113~~	~~113~~	27	198
28	Sofia Georgopoulou (GRE)	D	~~87~~	87	~~91~~	28	104	107	~~110~~	30	194
29	Galya Shatova (BUL)	C	85	88	~~90~~	26	105	~~107~~	~~107~~	32	193
30	Jessica Gordon Brown (GBR)	C	83	~~86~~	86	33	106	~~109~~	~~112~~	31	192
31	María Kardara (GRE)	D	88	~~91~~	~~91~~	25	103	~~107~~	~~108~~	38	191
32	Boldbaataryn Khongorzul (MGL)	C	~~83~~	83	~~87~~	39	108	~~112~~	~~115~~	29	191
33	Tenishia Thornton (MLT)	D	80	82	84	36	~~101~~	101	104	37	188
34	Brenna Kean (AUS)	E	79	83	~~86~~	37	104	~~108~~	~~108~~	33	187
35	Hannah Crymble (IRL)	E	80	~~82~~	83	38	100	~~104~~	104	35	187
36	Scheila Meister (SUI)	D	82	~~85~~	85	34	102	~~105~~	~~105~~	39	187
37	Halle Mifsud (AUS)	E	75	~~79~~	80	41	~~103~~	104	~~109~~	34	184
38	Amalie Løvind (DEN)	D	80	~~83~~	~~84~~	42	101	104	~~107~~	36	184
39	Sofía Aleman (HON)	E	75	80	82	40	95	~~100~~	~~100~~	41	177
40	Kimberly Palacios (CRC)	E	~~75~~	75	~~78~~	43	87	~~91~~	~~91~~	42	162
41	Stephen Myonly (NRU)	E	65	70	73	44	85	~~90~~	~~90~~	44	158
42	Emelin Ortiz (HON)	E	65	~~68~~	~~68~~	46	85	~~88~~	~~88~~	43	150
43	Alanoud Al-Shehri (KSA)	E	~~65~~	65	70	45	~~77~~	77	~~81~~	46	147
44	Johana Prieto (PAR)	E	~~63~~	~~64~~	64	47	77	~~81~~	~~82~~	45	141
—	Lucrezia Magistris (ITA)	A	~~98~~	98	~~101~~	7	~~115~~	~~116~~	~~116~~	—	—
—	Elreen Ando (PHI)	A	97	~~101~~	~~102~~	8	~~127~~	—	—	—	—
—	Sabine Kusterer (GER)	C	85	87	~~88~~	29	~~107~~	~~107~~	~~107~~	—	—
—	Génesis Rodríguez (VEN)	B	~~95~~	~~95~~	~~95~~	—	~~115~~	115	—	18	—
—	Irene Martínez (ESP)	C	~~90~~	~~90~~	~~90~~	—	101	~~106~~	~~107~~	40	—
—	Mouna Skandi (ESP)	E	~~80~~	~~80~~	~~80~~	—	—	—	—	—	—
—	Fraer Morrow (GBR)	C	—	—	—	—	—	—	—	—	—
—	Sanne Bijleveld (NED)	D	—	—	—	—	—	—	—	—	—
—	Þuríður Erla Helgadóttir (ISL)	D	Did not start								
—	Jacinta Sumagaysay (GUM)	E	Did not start								
