= Weightlifting at the 2017 Summer Universiade – Women's 58 kg =

Women's 58 kg at the XXIX Summer Universiade
- Venues: Tamkang University Shao-Mo Memorial Gymnasium 7F
- Dates: 21 August 2017
- Competitors: 18 from 15 nations

Medalists
| 1st place, gold medalist(s) | | Kuo Hsing-chun | Chinese Taipei |
| 2nd place, silver medalist(s) | | Sukanya Srisurat | Thailand |
| 3rd place, bronze medalist(s) | | Kim Chung-sim | North Korea |

The women's 58 kg event at the 2017 Summer Universiade was held on 21 August at the Tamkang University Shao-Mo Memorial Gymnasium 7F.

== Records ==
Prior to this competition, the existing world and Universiade records were as follows.

- Initial records

| Category | | Nation | Athlete | Record | Place | Date | Meet |
|---|---|---|---|---|---|---|---|
| World record | Snatch | Azerbaijan | Boyanka Kostova | 112 kg | Houston, United States | 23 November 2015 | 2015 World Championships |
| World record | Clean & Jerk | China | Qiu Hongmei | 141 kg | Tai'an, China | 23 April 2007 | 2007 Asian Championships |
| World record | Total | Azerbaijan | Boyanka Kostova | 252 kg | Houston, United States | 23 November 2015 | 2015 World Championships |
| Universiade records | Snatch | Chinese Taipei (TPE) | Kuo Hsing-chun | 104 kg | Kazan, Russia | 8 July 2013 | 2013 Summer Universiade |
| Universiade records | Clean & Jerk | Chinese Taipei (TPE) | Kuo Hsing-chun | 134 kg | Kazan, Russia | 8 July 2013 | 2013 Summer Universiade |
| Universiade records | Total | Chinese Taipei (TPE) | Kuo Hsing-chun | 238 kg | Kazan, Russia | 8 July 2013 | 2013 Summer Universiade |

- Broken record

| Category | | Nation | Athlete | Record | Place | Date |
|---|---|---|---|---|---|---|
| World record | Clean & Jerk | Chinese Taipei (TPE) | Kuo Hsing-chun | 142 kg | New Taipei, Taiwan | 21 August 2017 |
| Universiade records | Snatch | Chinese Taipei (TPE) | Kuo Hsing-chun | 107 kg | New Taipei, Taiwan | 21 August 2017 |
| Universiade records | Clean & Jerk | Chinese Taipei (TPE) | Kuo Hsing-chun | 142 kg | New Taipei, Taiwan | 21 August 2017 |
| Universiade records | Total | Chinese Taipei (TPE) | Kuo Hsing-chun | 249 kg | New Taipei, Taiwan | 21 August 2017 |

== Results ==
| Rank | Athlete | Group | Body weight | Snatch (kg) | | | | Clean & Jerk (kg) | | | | Total |
| Rank | Athlete | Group | Body weight | 1 | 2 | 3 | Result | 1 | 2 | 3 | Result | Total |
|---|---|---|---|---|---|---|---|---|---|---|---|---|
| 1st place, gold medalist(s) | Kuo Hsing-chun (TPE) | A | 57.83 | 102 | 105 | 107 | 107 UR | 133 | 136 | 142 | 142 WR UR | 249 UR |
| 2nd place, silver medalist(s) | Sukanya Srisurat (THA) | A | 57.64 | 95 | ~~100~~ | 100 | 100 | 118 | 121 | ~~123~~ | 121 | 221 |
| 3rd place, bronze medalist(s) | Kim Chung-sim (PRK) | A | 57.88 | 90 | ~~94~~ | ~~94~~ | 90 | 121 | 127 | ~~132~~ | 127 | 217 |
| 4 | Acchedya Jagaddhita (INA) | A | 57.20 | 90 | ~~94~~ | ~~94~~ | 90 | 108 | 112 | ~~115~~ | 112 | 202 |
| 5 | Saule Saduakassova (KAZ) | A | 57.09 | 86 | ~~90~~ | ~~90~~ | 86 | 110 | ~~115~~ | ~~117~~ | 110 | 196 |
| 6 | Carolina Guadalupe Lugo (MEX) | A | 57.90 | ~~84~~ | ~~84~~ | 84 | 84 | ~~107~~ | 107 | 111 | 111 | 195 |
| 7 | Taylor Nicole Turner (USA) | A | 57.07 | 82 | 85 | ~~87~~ | 85 | 100 | ~~105~~ | ~~105~~ | 100 | 185 |
| 8 | Mako Yamamoto (JPN) | A | 57.99 | 80 | ~~83~~ | 83 | 83 | ~~100~~ | 100 | ~~105~~ | 100 | 183 |
| 9 | Yui Yamamura (JPN) | B | 57.92 | 75 | 78 | ~~80~~ | 78 | 97 | 100 | 102 | 102 | 180 |
| 10 | Caroline Lamarche McClure (CAN) | B | 57.78 | 78 | ~~81~~ | ~~81~~ | 78 | 96 | ~~99~~ | 101 | 101 | 179 |
| 11 | Emma Enberg (SWE) | B | 57.43 | ~~75~~ | 75 | 77 | 77 | 94 | 98 | 100 | 100 | 177 |
| 12 | Sümeyye Kentli (TUR) | A | 58.00 | 75 | 78 | ~~81~~ | 78 | 95 | – | – | 95 | 173 |
| 13 | Bayartsetseg Oyuntungalag (MGL) | A | 57.42 | 74 | ~~77~~ | ~~77~~ | 74 | 92 | ~~97~~ | ~~97~~ | 92 | 166 |
| 14 | Sara Andreasen (DEN) | B | 57.40 | 65 | 68 | ~~70~~ | 68 | 78 | 81 | 83 | 83 | 151 |
| 15 | Tika Maya Gurung (NEP) | B | 54.76 | 45 | 48 | ~~51~~ | 48 | 55 | 60 | 63 | 63 | 111 |
| 16 | Manisha Ranabhat (NEP) | B | 55.56 | 45 | 50 | ~~53~~ | 50 | 55 | 60 | ~~65~~ | 60 | 110 |
| | Danielle Marie Roberts (USA) | A | 57.91 | ~~81~~ | 81 | ~~85~~ | 81 | ~~100~~ | ~~100~~ | ~~100~~ | – | – |
| | Xiong Pei (CHN) | A | 56.92 | ~~87~~ | ~~87~~ | ~~87~~ | – | | | | | – |
