= 2017 World Weightlifting Championships – Women's 58 kg =

The Women's 58 kg competition at the 2017 World Weightlifting Championships was held on 30 November 2017.

== Schedule ==
Date	Time	Event
29 November 2017	10:55	Group B
30 November 2017	19:55	Group A

== Medalists ==
Event	Gold		Silver		Bronze	
Snatch	Sukanya Srisurat (THA)	105 kg	Kuo Hsing-chun (TPE)	105 kg	Rebeka Koha (LAT)	101 kg
Clean & Jerk	Kuo Hsing-chun (TPE)	135 kg	Mikiko Ando (JPN)	126 kg	Alexandra Escobar (ECU)	122 kg
Total	Kuo Hsing-chun (TPE)	240 kg	Sukanya Srisurat (THA)	225 kg	Rebeka Koha (LAT)	222 kg

== Records ==
Prior to this competition, the existing world records were as follows.

World Record	Snatch	Boyanka Kostova (AZE)	112 kg	Houston, United States	23 November 2015
World Record	Clean & Jerk	Kuo Hsing-chun (TPE)	142 kg	Taipei, Taiwan	21 August 2017
World Record	Total	Boyanka Kostova (AZE)	252 kg	Houston, United States	23 November 2015

== Results ==
Rank	Athlete	Group	Snatch (kg)				Clean & Jerk (kg)				Total
Rank	Athlete	Group	1	2	3	Rank	1	2	3	Rank	Total
1st place, gold medalist(s)	Kuo Hsing-chun (TPE)	A	99	102	105	2nd place, silver medalist(s)	126	131	135	1st place, gold medalist(s)	240
2nd place, silver medalist(s)	Sukanya Srisurat (THA)	A	99	102	105	1st place, gold medalist(s)	117	120	~~124~~	6	225
3rd place, bronze medalist(s)	Rebeka Koha (LAT)	A	94	98	101	3rd place, bronze medalist(s)	114	118	121	5	222
4	Mikiko Ando (JPN)	A	~~93~~	93	~~95~~	7	123	126	~~130~~	2nd place, silver medalist(s)	219
5	Alexandra Escobar (ECU)	A	93	96	~~99~~	5	116	119	122	3rd place, bronze medalist(s)	218
6	Quisia Guicho (MEX)	A	87	89	91	8	118	121	~~123~~	4	212
7	María Lobón (COL)	A	93	95	~~98~~	6	112	~~117~~	~~119~~	8	207
8	Evagjelia Veli (ALB)	A	90	~~94~~	~~94~~	9	110	~~113~~	113	7	203
9	Tali Darsigny (CAN)	B	84	~~87~~	87	11	103	107	109	10	196
10	Þuríður Helgadóttir (ISL)	B	79	83	86	12	97	103	108	12	194
11	Jennifer Lombardo (ITA)	B	81	83	~~85~~	13	100	105	108	13	193
12	Katarzyna Kraska (POL)	B	80	82	~~84~~	14	~~108~~	108	~~113~~	11	190
13	Irina Lepșa (ROU)	B	~~82~~	82	~~85~~	15	98	102	~~105~~	14	184
14	Rachel Leblanc-Bazinet (CAN)	B	~~76~~	76	78	17	98	~~101~~	~~101~~	15	176
15	Laura Hewitt (GBR)	B	75	79	~~82~~	16	93	~~99~~	~~99~~	16	172
—	Muattar Nabieva (UZB)	A	90	94	97	4	~~113~~	~~113~~	~~115~~	—	—
—	Kim So-hwa (KOR)	A	89	~~92~~	~~92~~	10	~~110~~	~~110~~	~~110~~	—	—
—	Karool Blanco (COL)	A	~~93~~	~~93~~	~~93~~	—	~~111~~	~~111~~	111	9	—
