= 2014 World Weightlifting Championships – Women's 58 kg =

Weightlifting competition

The women's 58 kilograms event at the 2014 World Weightlifting Championships was held on 10 and 11 November 2014 in Baluan Sholak Sports Palace, Almaty, Kazakhstan.

== Schedule ==
Date	Time	Event
10 November 2014	21:00	Group C
11 November 2014	16:00	Group B
11 November 2014	19:00	Group A

== Medalists ==
Event	Gold		Silver		Bronze	
Snatch	Sukanya Srisurat (THA)	106 kg	Deng Mengrong (CHN)	105 kg	Yenny Álvarez (COL)	100 kg
Clean & Jerk	Rattikan Gulnoi (THA)	131 kg	Deng Mengrong (CHN)	130 kg	Yenny Álvarez (COL)	125 kg
Total	Deng Mengrong (CHN)	235 kg	Sukanya Srisurat (THA)	231 kg	Rattikan Gulnoi (THA)	231 kg

== Records ==
Prior to this competition, the existing world records were as follows.

World Record	Snatch	Chen Yanqing (CHN)	111 kg	Doha, Qatar	3 December 2006
World Record	Clean & Jerk	Qiu Hongmei (CHN)	141 kg	Tai'an, China	23 April 2007
World Record	Total	Chen Yanqing (CHN)	251 kg	Doha, Qatar	3 December 2006

== Results ==
Rank	Athlete	Group	Body weight	Snatch (kg)				Clean & Jerk (kg)				Total
Rank	Athlete	Group	Body weight	1	2	3	Rank	1	2	3	Rank	Total
1st place, gold medalist(s)	Deng Mengrong (CHN)	A	57.06	101	104	105	2nd place, silver medalist(s)	130	~~133~~	~~133~~	2nd place, silver medalist(s)	235
2nd place, silver medalist(s)	Sukanya Srisurat (THA)	A	57.75	102	105	106	1st place, gold medalist(s)	120	~~125~~	125	4	231
3rd place, bronze medalist(s)	Rattikan Gulnoi (THA)	A	57.40	95	100	~~102~~	4	125	129	131	1st place, gold medalist(s)	231
4	Yenny Álvarez (COL)	A	56.81	95	100	~~103~~	3rd place, bronze medalist(s)	118	122	125	3rd place, bronze medalist(s)	225
5	Kuo Hsing-chun (TPE)	A	57.72	~~98~~	98	~~100~~	6	125	~~129~~	~~131~~	5	223
6	Lina Rivas (COL)	A	57.78	95	100	~~103~~	5	115	118	~~120~~	8	218
7	Irina Lepșa (ROU)	A	57.68	~~90~~	~~90~~	90	13	111	116	119	7	209
8	Mikiko Ando (JPN)	A	57.59	87	89	~~91~~	16	116	~~119~~	119	6	208
9	Yusleidy Figueroa (VEN)	B	57.71	88	~~91~~	91	11	110	115	117	9	208
10	Joanna Łochowska (POL)	A	57.65	~~90~~	90	93	7	~~112~~	112	~~116~~	11	205
11	Quisia Guicho (MEX)	B	57.97	86	90	~~92~~	14	115	~~120~~	~~120~~	10	205
12	Elena Shadrina (RUS)	B	57.29	92	~~94~~	~~94~~	9	108	111	~~114~~	12	203
13	Chiang Nien-hsin (TPE)	A	57.41	85	~~89~~	89	15	111	~~116~~	~~116~~	13	200
14	Kateryna Driumova (UKR)	B	57.63	89	92	~~94~~	10	102	105	107	18	199
15	Esraa El-Sayed (EGY)	B	57.77	88	~~93~~	93	8	103	~~106~~	~~106~~	22	196
16	Jennifer Hernández (ECU)	B	57.93	~~84~~	84	~~87~~	22	105	110	~~112~~	15	194
17	Jennifer Lombardo (ITA)	B	57.51	79	83	~~85~~	23	105	~~110~~	110	14	193
18	Yaneth Sous (VEN)	C	57.89	80	84	~~87~~	21	~~105~~	105	109	16	193
19	Cortney Batchelor (USA)	B	58.00	83	86	~~88~~	18	102	107	~~111~~	19	193
20	Loredana Heghiș (ROU)	C	57.63	81	85	~~87~~	19	102	105	107	17	192
21	Farangiz Shomurodova (UZB)	C	57.76	80	83	85	20	100	103	106	20	191
22	Anna Athanasiadou (GRE)	B	57.48	85	90	~~92~~	12	100	~~105~~	~~105~~	25	190
23	Liudmila Bryl (BLR)	B	57.92	~~83~~	83	~~86~~	24	102	106	~~109~~	21	189
24	Dora Tchakounté (FRA)	C	56.48	80	84	87	17	96	100	~~104~~	24	187
25	Roilya Ranaivosoa (MRI)	C	57.13	76	79	~~83~~	28	96	101	~~105~~	23	180
26	Alba Sánchez (ESP)	C	57.14	77	81	~~83~~	26	97	~~102~~	~~102~~	26	178
27	Konstantina Benteli (GRE)	C	56.00	~~82~~	82	~~86~~	25	90	95	~~100~~	27	177
28	Seen Lee (AUS)	C	57.70	78	~~81~~	81	27	~~95~~	~~95~~	95	28	176
29	Milijana Vojnović (CRO)	C	57.12	63	68	70	29	77	81	~~85~~	31	151
30	Klára Kasza-Kovács (HUN)	C	57.69	64	~~68~~	~~68~~	30	84	~~88~~	~~88~~	30	148
—	Ayesha Al-Balooshi (UAE)	C	56.92	~~70~~	~~70~~	~~70~~	—	80	83	86	29	—
—	Yineisy Reyes (DOM)	B	57.79	~~88~~	~~88~~	~~88~~	—	—	—	—	—	—
DQ	Ri Jong-hwa (PRK)	A	57.63	99	~~103~~	~~103~~	—	129	~~133~~	133	—	—
