= Dora Tchakounté =

French weightlifter (born 1995)

Personal information
- Full name: Dora Meiriama Tchakounté
- Nationality: Cameroonian; French (since 2007)
- Born: 23 March 1995 (age 31) Yaoundé, Cameroon

Sport
- Country: France
- Sport: Weightlifting
- Weight class: 59 kg
- Club: VGA Saint-Maur
- Coached by: Yann Morisseau, Frantz Felicite
Medal record
Women's weightlifting
Representing France
European Championships
| Gold medal – first place | 2022 Tirana | 59 kg |
| Silver medal – second place | 2021 Moscow | 59 kg |
| Silver medal – second place | 2024 Sofia | 59 kg |

Dora Meiriama Tchakounté (born 23 March 1995) is a French weightlifter born in Yaoundé, Cameroon.

== Early life ==
Tchakounté was born in 1995 in Yaoundé, Cameroon. She acquired French nationality on 10 August 2007, through the collective effect of her mother's naturalization.

== Career ==
Tchakounté competed in the women's 58 kg event at the 2014 World Weightlifting Championships in Almaty, Kazakhstan and the 2015 World Weightlifting Championships in Houston, United States. She also competed in the women's 59 kg event at the 2018 World Weightlifting Championships in Ashgabat, Turkmenistan and the 2019 World Weightlifting Championships in Pattaya, Thailand.

She won the silver medal in the women's 59 kg event at the 2021 European Weightlifting Championships held in Moscow, Russia. At the time, she won the bronze medal but in October 2021, this became the silver medal after original gold medalist Boyanka Kostova of Azerbaijan was banned for testing positive for traces of stanozolol.

In 2021, Tchakounté represented France at the 2020 Summer Olympics in Tokyo, Japan. She finished in 4th place in the women's 59 kg event.

She competed in the women's 71 kg event at the 2022 Mediterranean Games held in Oran, Algeria. In 2023, she competed in the women's 59 kg event at the World Weightlifting Championships held in Riyadh, Saudi Arabia.

In August 2024, Tchakounté competed in the women's 59 kg event at the 2024 Summer Olympics held in Paris, France. She lifted 213 kg in total and finished in 9th place. She didn't make the third attempt in the Clear & Jerk because of fragility of her right elbow.

== Major results ==
| Year | Venue | Weight | Snatch (kg) | | | | Clean & Jerk (kg) | | | | Total | Rank |
| Year | Venue | Weight | 1 | 2 | 3 | Rank | 1 | 2 | 3 | Rank | Total | Rank |
Summer Olympics
| 2021 | Tokyo, Japan | 59 kg | 93 | 96 | ~~98~~ | —N/a | 112 | 117 | ~~120~~ | —N/a | 213 | 4 |
| 2024 | Paris, France | 59 kg | 95 | 98 | ~~100~~ | —N/a | 115 | ~~118~~ | — | —N/a | 213 | 9 |
World Championships
| 2014 | Almaty, Kazakhstan | 58 kg | 80 | 84 | 87 | 17 | 96 | 100 | ~~104~~ | 24 | 187 | 24 |
| 2015 | Houston, United States | 58 kg | 85 | 88 | ~~90~~ | 17 | 100 | 102 | ~~104~~ | 26 | 190 | 23 |
| 2018 | Ashgabat, Turkmenistan | 59 kg | 88 | 92 | 95 | 8 | 105 | 108 | ~~110~~ | 19 | 203 | 13 |
| 2019 | Pattaya, Thailand | 59 kg | 88 | 92 | ~~96~~ | 13 | ~~110~~ | 110 | 114 | 14 | 206 | 12 |
| 2022 | Bogotá, Colombia | 59 kg | ~~96~~ | 96 | ~~99~~ | 10 | 115 | 120 | ~~122~~ | 10 | 216 | 9 |
| 2023 | Riyadh, Saudi Arabia | 59 kg | 93 | 96 | ~~99~~ | 12 | ~~115~~ | 115 | ~~121~~ | 22 | 211 | 19 |
IWF World Cup
| 2024 | Phuket, Thailand | 59 kg | 95 | 98 | 101 | 8 | 115 | 120 | 123 | 10 | 224 | 10 |
European Championships
| 2016 | Førde, Norway | 58 kg | 84 | ~~88~~ | 88 | 4 | 100 | 103 | 106 | 9 | 194 | 6 |
| 2019 | Batumi, Georgia | 59 kg | 90 | 94 | ~~97~~ | 6 | 105 | 110 | ~~112~~ | 7 | 204 | 7 |
| 2021 | Moscow, Russia | 59 kg | 92 | 95 | ~~97~~ | 2nd place, silver medalist(s) | 110 | ~~115~~ | 115 | 2nd place, silver medalist(s) | 210 | 2nd place, silver medalist(s) |
| 2022 | Tirana, Albania | 59 kg | 93 | 96 | ~~98~~ | 2nd place, silver medalist(s) | 113 | ~~117~~ | 117 | 2nd place, silver medalist(s) | 213 | 1st place, gold medalist(s) |
| 2023 | Yerevan, Armenia | 64 kg | 93 | ~~98~~ | ~~98~~ | 4 | 113 | 116 | ~~120~~ | 4 | 209 | 6 |
| 2024 | Sofia, Bulgaria | 59 kg | ~~95~~ | 95 | 98 | 3rd place, bronze medalist(s) | ~~117~~ | 117 | ~~120~~ | 4 | 215 | 2nd place, silver medalist(s) |
