= Luo Shifang =

Chinese weightlifter (born 2001)

Personal information
- Native name: 罗诗芳
- Born: 2 April 2001 (age 25) Guiyang County, Chenzhou, Hunan, China
- Education: Southwest University

Sport
- Country: China
- Sport: Weightlifting
- Weight class: 59 kg
- Club: Hunan Province
- Coached by: Zhang Guozheng

Achievements and titles
- Olympic finals: 2
- World finals: 1
- National finals: 3
Medal record
Women's weightlifting
Representing China
Olympic Games
Gold medal – first place	2024 Paris	59 kg
World Championships
Gold medal – first place	2023 Riyadh	59 kg
Asian Games
Silver medal – second place	2022 Hangzhou	59 kg
Asian Championships
Gold medal – first place	2023 Jinju	59 kg

Luo Shifang (Chinese: 罗诗芳; pinyin: Luó Shīfāng; born 2 April 2001) is a Chinese weightlifter. Born in Guiyang County, she started weightlifting when she was twelve for her physical fitness. She first competed at the 2017 Asian Youth & Junior Weightlifting Championships where she won a gold in the youth division.

Luo made her senior debut at the 2022 World Weightlifting Championships, where she placed fourth. She returned at the 2023 Asian Weightlifting Championships and placed first, winning the world championships in the same year. She set her first world record at the 2024 IWF World Cup with 248 kg. At the 2024 Summer Olympics, she won the gold medal in her event and set three new Olympic records.

== Early and personal life ==
Luo Shifang was born on 2 April 2001 in Haitang Village in Guiyang County of Hunan, China. When she was twelve, she was influenced by her family to start weightlifting to improve her physical fitness. For her higher education, she majored in sports training at the College of Physical Education in Southwest University and graduated in 2021. As of 2024, she resides in Beijing.

== Career ==
=== 2017 ===
Luo's first International Weightlifting Federation-sanctioned competition was the 2017 Asian Youth & Junior Weightlifting Championships in Kathmandu, Nepal. She competed in the women's 58 kg category in both divisions, where she snatched 85 kg and clean and jerked 110 kg for a total of 195 kg. She placed fourth in the junior division and placed first in the youth division.

=== 2020–2022 ===
Prior to her senior international debut, Luo won the 2020 and 2021 National Women's Weightlifting Championship, setting a national record in the snatch in the latter. She also won the women's 59 kg event at the 2021 National Games of China with a total of 241 kilograms, which would have surpassed the junior world record at the time. She made her senior international debut at the 2022 World Weightlifting Championships in Bogotá, Colombia. In the women's 59 kg event, she snatched 101 kg and clean and jerked 129 kg for a total of 230 kg, placing fourth overall. Although she did not win a medal for the total lift, she won the bronze in the clean and jerk.

=== 2023–present ===
Five months after her world championship appearance, Luo returned in April 2023 for the 2023 Asian Weightlifting Championships in Jinju, South Korea, competing in the women's 59 kg event. She snatched 105 kg and clean and jerked 133 kg for a total of 238 kg. Alongside the gold medal for the overall lift, she won a gold medal in the snatch and a silver medal in the clean and jerk. She then competed at the 2023 World Weightlifting Championships in Riyadh, Saudi Arabia, in September. In the same category, she snatched 107 kg and clean and jerked 136 kg for a total of 243 kg, winning all three of the available gold medals in her event. In the same month, she competed at the 2022 Asian Games which were rescheduled to 2023 and were held in Hangzhou, China. She snatched 107 kg and clean and jerked 133 kg for a total of 240 kg, placing second behind Kim Il-gyong of North Korea.

Luo's last competition in 2023 was the 2023 IWF Grand Prix II in Doha, Qatar, in December. She snatched 108 kg and clean and jerked 139 kg for a total of 247 kg and the gold medal, which equaled the world record at the time held by Kuo Hsing-Chun of Chinese Taipei. She then competed in the 2024 IWF World Cup in Phuket, Thailand, in April, as a qualifying event for the Olympic Games. She lifted 108 kg in the snatch, 140 kg in the clean and jerk, and finished with a total of 248 kg to win the overall gold medal and her first total world record.

At the 2024 Summer Olympics in Paris, France, Luo competed in the women's 59 kg event. Coming into the event, she was ranked first in the qualification ranking, and publications such as Sports Illustrated and Rappler predicted that Luo would be a medal contender in the event, with the former predicting she would win gold. She lifted 107 kg in the snatch, 134 kg in the clean and jerk, and finished with a total of 241 kg for the gold medal. She also set new Olympic records in snatch, clean and jerk, and total, breaking those originally held by Kuo. The Olympic Council of Asia later opined that she had "entertained" the crowd due to her hand gestures to make the crowd silent during her attempts.

== Achievements ==
Competition summary
Year	Venue	Weight	Snatch (kg)				Clean and jerk (kg)				Total	Rank
Year	Venue	Weight	1	2	3	Rank	1	2	3	Rank	Total	Rank
Olympic Games
2024	Paris, France	59 kg	101	105	107 OR	—N/a	129	134 OR	~~137~~	—N/a	241 OR	1st place, gold medalist(s)
World Championships
2022	Bogotá, Colombia	59 kg	101	~~104~~	~~104~~	5	126	129	~~133~~	3rd place, bronze medalist(s)	230	4
2023	Riyadh, Saudi Arabia	59 kg	101	104	107	1st place, gold medalist(s)	128	133	136	1st place, gold medalist(s)	243	1st place, gold medalist(s)
IWF World Cup
2024	Phuket, Thailand	59 kg	103	~~108~~	108	2nd place, silver medalist(s)	133	~~140~~	140	1st place, gold medalist(s)	248 CWR	1st place, gold medalist(s)
Asian Games
2023	Hangzhou, China	59 kg	100	104	107	—N/a	128	133	~~140~~	—N/a	240	2nd place, silver medalist(s)
Asian Championships
2023	Jinju, South Korea	59 kg	98	102	105	1st place, gold medalist(s)	126	130	133	2nd place, silver medalist(s)	238	1st place, gold medalist(s)
