= 2023 World Weightlifting Championships – Women's 59 kg =

The women's 59 kilograms competition at the 2023 World Weightlifting Championships was held on 7 and 8 September 2023.

== Schedule ==
Date	Time	Event
7 September 2023	09:30	Group E
7 September 2023	11:30	Group D
7 September 2023	13:30	Group C
8 September 2023	16:30	Group B
8 September 2023	19:00	Group A

== Medalists ==
Event	Gold		Silver		Bronze	
Snatch	Luo Shifang (CHN)	107 kg	Kamila Konotop (UKR)	106 kg	Pei Xinyi (CHN)	102 kg
Clean & Jerk	Luo Shifang (CHN)	136 kg	Kuo Hsing-chun (TPE)	130 kg	Kamila Konotop (UKR)	130 kg
Total	Luo Shifang (CHN)	243 kg	Kamila Konotop (UKR)	236 kg	Pei Xinyi (CHN)	232 kg

== Records ==
Prior to this competition, the existing world records were as follows.

World record	Snatch	Kuo Hsing-chun (TPE)	110 kg	Tashkent, Uzbekistan	19 April 2021
World record	Clean & Jerk	Kuo Hsing-chun (TPE)	140 kg	Pattaya, Thailand	21 September 2019
World record	Total	Kuo Hsing-chun (TPE)	247 kg	Tashkent, Uzbekistan	19 April 2021

== Results ==
Rank	Athlete	Group	Snatch (kg)				Clean & Jerk (kg)				Total
Rank	Athlete	Group	1	2	3	Rank	1	2	3	Rank	Total
1st place, gold medalist(s)	Luo Shifang (CHN)	A	101	104	107	1st place, gold medalist(s)	128	133	136	1st place, gold medalist(s)	243
2nd place, silver medalist(s)	Kamila Konotop (UKR)	A	103	~~106~~	106	2nd place, silver medalist(s)	126	130	~~135~~	3rd place, bronze medalist(s)	236
3rd place, bronze medalist(s)	Pei Xinyi (CHN)	A	98	~~102~~	102	3rd place, bronze medalist(s)	127	~~130~~	130	4	232
4	Kuo Hsing-chun (TPE)	C	95	98	101	4	120	125	130	2nd place, silver medalist(s)	231
5	Yenny Álvarez (COL)	A	100	~~103~~	~~103~~	6	129	~~132~~	~~132~~	5	229
6	Rafiatu Lawal (NGR)	C	95	~~100~~	100	5	120	125	~~130~~	7	225
7	Hidilyn Diaz (PHI)	A	~~95~~	95	97	11	121	125	127	6	224
8	Elreen Ando (PHI)	A	95	98	100	7	118	122	~~125~~	11	222
9	Nina Sterckx (BEL)	A	95	97	99	8	117	121	~~123~~	12	220
10	Taylor Wilkins (USA)	A	93	~~97~~	98	9	122	~~126~~	~~127~~	10	220
11	Anyelin Venegas (VEN)	C	~~95~~	95	~~98~~	15	120	124	~~126~~	8	219
12	Janeth Gómez (MEX)	A	93	~~96~~	96	13	118	121	~~124~~	14	217
13	Mikiko Andoh (JPN)	B	92	94	~~96~~	19	122	~~124~~	~~124~~	9	216
14	Danielle Gunnin (USA)	A	~~98~~	~~98~~	98	10	~~118~~	118	~~123~~	19	216
15	Adijat Olarinoye (NGR)	C	95	~~100~~	~~100~~	14	115	120	~~124~~	15	215
16	Daphne Guillén (MEX)	A	92	94	~~96~~	21	118	121	~~124~~	13	215
17	Eduarda Souza (BRA)	B	90	94	~~98~~	17	~~115~~	116	120	16	214
18	Alina Shchapanava (AIN)	B	92	~~95~~	~~95~~	27	113	116	119	17	211
19	Dora Tchakounté (FRA)	A	93	96	~~99~~	12	~~115~~	115	~~121~~	22	211
20	Mattie Sasser (MHL)	B	90	~~94~~	94	20	112	~~116~~	116	21	210
21	Suratwadee Yodsarn (THA)	B	~~90~~	90	~~93~~	31	115	~~119~~	119	18	209
22	Sarah (INA)	C	~~90~~	~~90~~	92	26	110	116	~~118~~	20	208
23	Lucrezia Magistris (ITA)	B	95	~~100~~	~~100~~	16	~~112~~	112	~~117~~	25	207
24	Garance Rigaud (FRA)	B	91	94	~~96~~	18	~~111~~	111	~~114~~	26	205
25	Zoe Smith (GBR)	C	87	90	~~92~~	29	113	~~116~~	~~116~~	24	203
26	Svitlana Samuliak (UKR)	B	93	~~95~~	~~95~~	23	110	~~113~~	~~113~~	28	203
27	Natasya Beteyob (INA)	C	92	~~96~~	~~96~~	25	108	110	~~112~~	27	202
28	Quàng Thị Tâm (VIE)	C	~~93~~	93	~~95~~	22	108	~~112~~	~~112~~	30	201
29	Thanaporn Saetia (THA)	D	82	87	90	28	108	—	—	29	198
30	Riri Endo (JPN)	C	~~90~~	90	~~95~~	30	107	~~113~~	~~121~~	31	197
31	Amalie Løvind (DEN)	D	79	~~82~~	82	34	103	106	~~110~~	33	188
32	Anneke Spies (RSA)	D	~~80~~	80	~~83~~	41	103	106	~~108~~	32	186
33	Hannah Crymble (IRL)	D	~~82~~	~~82~~	82	35	100	103	~~106~~	35	185
34	Brenna Kean (AUS)	D	~~81~~	81	~~84~~	37	104	~~108~~	~~108~~	34	185
35	Kristina Şermetowa (TKM)	D	77	81	~~83~~	36	~~95~~	100	~~104~~	36	181
36	Ech-Chaibia Ech-Chachouiy (MAR)	D	77	80	~~82~~	40	93	96	~~99~~	37	176
37	Rita Gomez (POR)	E	75	80	~~83~~	38	90	~~93~~	93	38	173
38	Ailbhe Mulvihill (IRL)	E	74	77	80	39	90	~~93~~	~~93~~	39	170
39	Sandra Mensimah Owusu (GHA)	E	70	~~75~~	75	42	85	90	~~93~~	40	165
40	Anabela Monteiro (POR)	E	~~70~~	~~73~~	73	43	85	~~90~~	~~92~~	41	158
41	Alanoud Al-Shehri (KSA)	E	68	~~71~~	~~73~~	44	78	81	~~84~~	43	149
42	Fatemah Al-Kahawaher (KSA)	E	58	~~61~~	61	45	78	81	84	42	145
—	Génesis Rodríguez (VEN)	C	~~94~~	~~94~~	~~94~~	—	~~114~~	114	~~117~~	23	—
—	Enkhbaataryn Enkhtamir (MGL)	B	~~93~~	93	~~97~~	24	~~112~~	~~112~~	~~112~~	—	—
—	Irene Martínez (ESP)	D	88	~~90~~	~~91~~	32	~~105~~	~~105~~	~~106~~	—	—
—	María Casadevall (ARG)	B	~~88~~	~~88~~	88	33	~~113~~	~~113~~	~~113~~	—	—
—	Ghofrane Belkhir (TUN)	B	~~90~~	~~90~~	~~90~~	—	—	—	—	—	—
—	Boldbaataryn Khongorzul (MGL)	C	~~85~~	~~85~~	~~85~~	—	~~108~~	~~108~~	~~111~~	—	—
—	Sofia Georgopoulou (GRE)	D	~~89~~	~~90~~	~~90~~	—	—	—	—	—	—
—	Maude Charron (CAN)	E	—	—	—	—	—	—	—	—	—
—	Maria Kardara (GRE)	E	—	—	—	—	—	—	—	—	—
—	Gilyeliz Guzmán (PUR)	E	—	—	—	—	—	—	—	—	—
—	Jacinta Sumagaysay (GUM)	E	Did not start								
—	Sofía Aleman (HON)	E	Did not start								
