= Weightlifting at the 2018 Asian Games – Women's 58 kg =

Women's 58 kg at the 2018 Asian Games
- Venue: Jakarta International Expo
- Date: 23 August 2018
- Competitors: 7 from 7 nations

Medalists
gold medal	Kuo Hsing-chun	Chinese Taipei
silver medal	Sukanya Srisurat	Thailand
bronze medal	Mikiko Ando	Japan

The women's 58 kilograms event at the 2018 Asian Games took place on 23 August 2018 at the Jakarta International Expo Hall A.

Kuo Hsing-chun lifted 130.5 kg in her second clean and jerk attempt rather than 133 kg due to an error in the loading protocol, Kuo was credited with a 130 kg lift.

== Schedule ==
All times are Western Indonesia Time (UTC+07:00)

Date	Time	Event
Thursday, 23 August 2018	17:00	Group A

== Records ==
Prior to this competition, the existing world, Asian and Games records were as follows.

World Record	Snatch	Boyanka Kostova (AZE)	112 kg	Houston, United States	23 November 2015
World Record	Clean & Jerk	Kuo Hsing-chun (TPE)	142 kg	Taipei, Taiwan	21 August 2017
World Record	Total	Boyanka Kostova (AZE)	252 kg	Houston, United States	23 November 2015
Asian Record	Snatch	Chen Yanqing (CHN)	111 kg	Doha, Qatar	3 December 2006
Asian Record	Clean & Jerk	Kuo Hsing-chun (TPE)	142 kg	Taipei, Taiwan	21 August 2017
Asian Record	Total	Chen Yanqing (CHN)	251 kg	Doha, Qatar	3 December 2006
Games Record	Snatch	Chen Yanqing (CHN)	111 kg	Doha, Qatar	3 December 2006
Games Record	Clean & Jerk	Chen Yanqing (CHN)	140 kg	Doha, Qatar	3 December 2006
Games Record	Total	Chen Yanqing (CHN)	251 kg	Doha, Qatar	3 December 2006

== Results ==
Rank	Athlete	Group	Snatch (kg)				Clean & Jerk (kg)				Total
Rank	Athlete	Group	1	2	3	Result	1	2	3	Result	Total
1st place, gold medalist(s)	Kuo Hsing-chun (TPE)	A	100	103	105	105	125	130	~~143~~	130	235
2nd place, silver medalist(s)	Sukanya Srisurat (THA)	A	97	101	103	103	117	121	123	123	226
3rd place, bronze medalist(s)	Mikiko Ando (JPN)	A	~~91~~	~~91~~	91	91	122	~~127~~	127	127	218
4	Muattar Nabieva (UZB)	A	~~95~~	95	98	98	115	~~119~~	119	119	217
5	Acchedya Jagaddhita (INA)	A	93	~~97~~	~~97~~	93	111	115	~~121~~	115	208
6	Ham Eun-ji (KOR)	A	85	~~90~~	~~90~~	85	110	115	118	118	203
7	Alisa Xaiyasit (LAO)	A	~~63~~	63	~~65~~	63	75	78	~~80~~	78	141
