= Weightlifting at the 2020 Summer Olympics – Women's 59 kg =

Women's 59 kg at the Games of the XXXII Olympiad
- Venue: Tokyo International Forum
- Date: 27 July 2021
- Competitors: 14 from 14 nations
- Winning total: 236 kg OR

Medalists
1st place, gold medalist(s)		Kuo Hsing-chun	Chinese Taipei
2nd place, silver medalist(s)		Polina Guryeva	Turkmenistan
3rd place, bronze medalist(s)		Mikiko Ando	Japan

The women's 59 kg weightlifting competition at the 2020 Summer Olympics in Tokyo took place on 27 July at the Tokyo International Forum. This was the first ever 59 kg Olympic competition after the weight categories were reorganized in 2018.

Kuo Hsing-chun from Chinese Taipei set three Olympic records to win her first Olympic gold after her bronze medal at the 2016 Summer Olympics in the 58 kg competition. Polina Guryeva won the silver medal, the first ever Olympic medal for Turkmenistan, and Mikiko Ando won the bronze for the host nation, her first Olympic medal.

In group B, Canada's Tali Darsigny, Germany's Sabine Kusterer, Italy's Maria Grazia Alemanno and Australia's Erika Yamasaki earned their spots in top 14. Botswana's Magdeline Moyengwa and Alexandra Escobar of Ecuador failed to finish their attempts, thus they were eliminated from the event.

The bouquets were presented by IWF Honorary Vice President Chang Chao-kuo (Chinese Taipei), and the medals were presented by IOC Member Stefan Holm (Olympic Champion in athletics, Sweden).

== Records ==
Prior to this competition, the existing world and Olympic records were as follows.

World Record	Snatch	Kuo Hsing-chun (TPE)	110 kg	Tashkent, Uzbekistan	19 April 2021
World Record	Clean & Jerk	Kuo Hsing-chun (TPE)	140 kg	Pattaya, Thailand	21 September 2019
World Record	Total	Kuo Hsing-chun (TPE)	247 kg	Tashkent, Uzbekistan	19 April 2021
Olympic Record	Snatch	Olympic Standard	102 kg	—	1 November 2018
Olympic Record	Clean & Jerk	Olympic Standard	127 kg	—	1 November 2018
Olympic Record	Total	Olympic Standard	229 kg	—	1 November 2018

During the competition, Kuo Hsing-chun set three Olympic records: in snatch (103 kg), clean and jerk (133 kg), and total (236 kg).

== Results ==
Rank	Athlete	Nation	Group	Body weight	Snatch (kg)				Clean & Jerk (kg)				Total
Rank	Athlete	Nation	Group	Body weight	1	2	3	Result	1	2	3	Result	Total
1st place, gold medalist(s)	Kuo Hsing-chun	Chinese Taipei	A	58.65	100	~~103~~	103	103 OR	125	133	~~141~~	133 OR	236 OR
2nd place, silver medalist(s)	Polina Guryeva	Turkmenistan	A	58.95	93	~~96~~	96	96	116	119	121	121	217
3rd place, bronze medalist(s)	Mikiko Ando	Japan	A	58.70	92	94	~~96~~	94	116	~~120~~	120	120	214
4	Dora Tchakounté	France	A	58.55	93	96	~~98~~	96	112	117	~~120~~	117	213
5	Hoàng Thị Duyên	Vietnam	A	58.65	~~95~~	95	~~98~~	95	113	~~119~~	~~119~~	113	208
6	Yusleidy Figueroa	Venezuela	A	58.80	~~88~~	88	91	91	115	~~120~~	~~125~~	115	206
7	Izabella Yaylyan	Armenia	A	58.15	90	95	~~97~~	95	110	~~115~~	~~115~~	110	205
8	Zoe Smith	Great Britain	A	58.95	~~87~~	87	~~91~~	87	113	~~116~~	~~119~~	113	200
9	Tali Darsigny	Canada	B	59.00	86	88	90	90	106	~~109~~	109	109	199
10	Sabine Kusterer	Germany	B	58.70	88	90	91	91	~~107~~	107	~~109~~	107	198
11	Maria Grazia Alemanno	Italy	B	58.95	85	~~88~~	~~89~~	85	100	~~105~~	~~105~~	100	185
12	Erika Yamasaki	Australia	B	58.75	75	~~78~~	~~78~~	75	95	~~100~~	~~100~~	95	170
–	Magdeline Moyengwa	Botswana	B	58.05	65	~~70~~	70	70	~~80~~	~~80~~	~~80~~	–	–
–	Alexandra Escobar	Ecuador	A	58.75	~~95~~	~~95~~	~~95~~	–	–	–	–	–	DNF

== New records ==
Snatch	103 kg	Kuo Hsing-chun (TPE)	OR
Clean & Jerk	133 kg	Kuo Hsing-chun (TPE)	OR
Total	236 kg	Kuo Hsing-chun (TPE)	OR
