= 2015 World Weightlifting Championships – Women's 58 kg =

The women's 58 kilograms event at the 2015 World Weightlifting Championships were held on 22 and 23 November 2015 in Houston, United States.

== Schedule ==
Date	Time	Event
22 November 2015	11:30	Group C
23 November 2015	11:30	Group B
23 November 2015	14:55	Group A

== Medalists ==
Event	Gold		Silver		Bronze	
Snatch	Boyanka Kostova (AZE)	112 kg	Deng Mengrong (CHN)	108 kg	Sukanya Srisurat (THA)	106 kg
Clean & Jerk	Boyanka Kostova (AZE)	140 kg	Deng Mengrong (CHN)	137 kg	Kuo Hsing-chun (TPE)	133 kg
Total	Boyanka Kostova (AZE)	252 kg	Deng Mengrong (CHN)	245 kg	Kuo Hsing-chun (TPE)	237 kg

== Records ==
Prior to this competition, the existing world records were as follows.

World record	Snatch	Chen Yanqing (CHN)	111 kg	Doha, Qatar	3 December 2006
World record	Clean & Jerk	Qiu Hongmei (CHN)	141 kg	Tai'an, China	23 April 2007
World record	Total	Chen Yanqing (CHN)	251 kg	Doha, Qatar	3 December 2006

== Results ==
Rank	Athlete	Group	Body weight	Snatch (kg)				Clean & Jerk (kg)				Total
Rank	Athlete	Group	Body weight	1	2	3	Rank	1	2	3	Rank	Total
1st place, gold medalist(s)	Boyanka Kostova (AZE)	A	57.90	~~109~~	109	112	1st place, gold medalist(s)	136	~~140~~	140	1st place, gold medalist(s)	252
2nd place, silver medalist(s)	Deng Mengrong (CHN)	A	57.68	105	108	~~110~~	2nd place, silver medalist(s)	133	~~137~~	137	2nd place, silver medalist(s)	245
3rd place, bronze medalist(s)	Kuo Hsing-chun (TPE)	A	57.68	104	~~107~~	~~107~~	4	~~133~~	~~133~~	133	3rd place, bronze medalist(s)	237
4	Sukanya Srisurat (THA)	A	57.29	103	106	~~109~~	3rd place, bronze medalist(s)	~~121~~	~~121~~	121	7	227
5	Lina Rivas (COL)	A	57.69	97	~~102~~	~~103~~	6	115	120	124	5	221
6	Alexandra Escobar (ECU)	A	57.60	94	~~97~~	97	5	117	120	~~124~~	8	217
7	Mikiko Ando (JPN)	A	57.70	90	93	~~95~~	10	120	~~123~~	~~123~~	9	213
8	Yuderqui Contreras (DOM)	A	56.02	91	~~95~~	95	7	110	116	~~118~~	12	211
9	Chiang Nien-hsin (TPE)	B	57.38	89	~~94~~	~~94~~	15	113	118	122	6	211
10	Yusleidy Figueroa (VEN)	B	57.75	88	91	93	11	112	116	118	10	211
11	Irina Lepșa (ROU)	A	57.69	88	91	93	9	113	~~119~~	~~119~~	13	206
12	Quisia Guicho (MEX)	B	57.86	86	88	~~90~~	20	114	117	~~120~~	11	205
13	Joanna Łochowska (POL)	A	57.60	90	~~94~~	94	8	110	~~113~~	~~114~~	19	204
14	Izabella Yaylyan (ARM)	B	57.32	85	~~89~~	89	14	105	110	112	17	201
15	Patricia Domínguez (MEX)	B	57.83	88	~~91~~	~~91~~	19	110	113	~~115~~	15	201
16	Jessica Lucero (USA)	B	57.87	86	89	~~92~~	16	105	~~110~~	110	20	199
17	Aleksandra Klejnowska (POL)	B	57.90	85	~~87~~	~~87~~	23	110	113	~~115~~	16	198
18	Muattar Nabieva (UZB)	B	57.33	~~87~~	87	90	12	~~107~~	~~107~~	107	22	197
19	Angelica Roos (SWE)	B	57.77	84	~~87~~	~~87~~	24	109	~~113~~	113	14	197
20	Jennifer Lombardo (ITA)	B	56.53	84	86	~~87~~	22	105	~~110~~	110	18	196
21	Kim So-hwa (KOR)	C	57.57	~~84~~	84	88	18	103	108	~~112~~	21	196
22	Jenly Tegu Wini (SOL)	B	57.79	81	84	~~87~~	25	103	107	~~110~~	23	191
23	Dora Tchakounté (FRA)	B	57.21	85	88	~~90~~	17	100	102	~~104~~	26	190
24	Veronika Ivasiuk (UKR)	B	56.80	83	85	87	21	96	101	~~103~~	27	188
25	Lacey Van Der Marel (CAN)	C	57.77	88	~~90~~	90	13	~~98~~	~~98~~	98	31	188
26	Tia-Clair Toomey (AUS)	C	57.80	78	82	~~85~~	29	98	105	~~112~~	24	187
27	Mouna Skandi (ESP)	C	56.97	80	~~83~~	83	26	~~100~~	100	~~103~~	29	183
28	Sayli Valdespino (CUB)	C	57.34	75	79	82	28	97	101	~~105~~	28	183
29	Mattie Sasser (MHL)	C	57.54	77	80	~~82~~	31	100	103	~~106~~	25	183
30	Þuríður Helgadóttir (ISL)	C	57.57	73	77	81	30	96	100	~~104~~	30	181
31	Jenni Puputti (FIN)	C	57.19	~~79~~	80	83	27	93	97	~~101~~	32	180
32	Emma Alderdice (IRL)	C	57.26	~~72~~	~~72~~	72	32	88	91	94	33	166
33	Kristina Larsen (DEN)	C	56.47	62	~~65~~	65	35	85	~~88~~	88	34	153
34	Aoife MacNeill (IRL)	C	57.67	63	66	68	33	84	~~86~~	~~86~~	35	152
35	Altangereliin Bum-Ayuush (MGL)	C	55.67	67	~~72~~	~~72~~	34	81	~~85~~	~~90~~	36	148
—	Rattikan Gulnoi (THA)	A	57.73	~~95~~	~~95~~	~~95~~	—	128	~~134~~	~~134~~	4	—
DQ	Nastassia Novikava (BLR)	A	57.57	97	~~102~~	102	—	120	~~126~~	126	—	228

== New records ==
Snatch	112 kg	Boyanka Kostova (AZE)	WR
Total	252 kg	Boyanka Kostova (AZE)	WR
