= Ayesha Al-Balooshi =

Emirati weightlifter (born 1992)

Ayesha Shahriyar Mohammed S. Al-Blooshi
Personal information
- Born: 23 January 1992 (age 34)
- Weight: 56.92 kg (125.5 lb)

Sport
- Country: United Arab Emirates
- Sport: Weightlifting
- Team: National team
- Updated on 4 September 2016

Ayesha Shahriyar Mohammed Al-Blooshi (born 23 January 1992) is an Emirati weightlifter, competing in the 58 kg category and representing United Arab Emirates at international competitions.

She competed at world championships, most recently at the 2014 World Weightlifting Championships. She placed 16th in the women's 58 kg event at the 2016 Summer Olympics. She won the silver medal at the 2011 Pan Arab Games but was caught using performance-enhancing drugs and was stripped of her medal.

== Major results ==
Year	Venue	Weight	Snatch (kg)				Clean & Jerk (kg)				Total	Rank
Year	Venue	Weight	1	2	3	Rank	1	2	3	Rank	Total	Rank
World Championships
2014	Almaty, Kazakhstan	58 kg	~~70~~	~~70~~	~~70~~	---	80	83	86	29	0	---
2010	Antalya, Turkey	58 kg	~~40~~	42	45	29	52	58	~~61~~	27	103	26
Pan Arab Games
2011	Doha, Qatar	58 kg	62	65	~~70~~	DQ	75	~~80~~	80	DQ	145	DQ
