= Yenny Álvarez =

Colombian weightlifter (born 1995)

Personal information
- Citizenship: Colombian
- Born: Yenny Álvarez Caicedo; 24 May 1995 (age 31) Valle del Cauca, Colombia

Sport
- Country: Colombia
- Sport: Weightlifting
- Weight class: 59 kg

Achievements and titles
- Personal bests: Snatch: 105 kg (2024); Clean & jerk: 133 kg AM (2022); Total: 234 kg AM (2022)
Medal record
Representing Colombia
Women's weightlifting
Big (Total)
Event	1st	2nd	3rd
World Championships	1	1	1
Junior World Championships	0	1	0
Youth World Championships	0	1	0
Pan American Games	1	0	0
Pan American Championships	3	0	0
South American Games	1	0	1
Total	6	3	2
Big and small medals
Event	1st	2nd	3rd
World Championships	2	2	4
Junior World Championships	1	1	1
Youth World Championships	1	2	0
Pan American Games	1	0	0
Pan American Championships	9	0	0
CAC Games	4	0	0
South American Games	1	0	1
Bolivarian Games	2	0	0
Total	21	5	6
World Championships
Gold medal – first place	2022 Bogotá	59 kg
Silver medal – second place	2021 Tashkent	59 kg
Bronze medal – third place	2024 Manama	59 kg
Pan American Games
Gold medal – first place	2023 Santiago	59 kg
Pan American Championships
Gold medal – first place	2016 Cartagena	58 kg
Gold medal – first place	2021 Guayaquil	59 kg
Gold medal – first place	2022 Bogotá	59 kg
Central American and Caribbean Games
Gold medal – first place	2014 Veracruz	58 kg S
Gold medal – first place	2014 Veracruz	58 kg CJ
Gold medal – first place	2023 San Salvador	59 kg S
Gold medal – first place	2023 San Salvador	59 kg CJ
South American Games
Gold medal – first place	2022 Asunción	59 kg
Bronze medal – third place	2014 Santiago	58 kg
Bolivarian Games
Gold medal – first place	2022 Valledupar	59 kg S
Gold medal – first place	2022 Valledupar	59 kg CJ
Junior World Championships
Silver medal – second place	2014 Kazan	58 kg
Youth World Championships
Silver medal – second place	2012 Košice	53 kg

Yenny Álvarez Caicedo (born 24 May 1995) is a Colombian weightlifter. She won the gold medal in the women's 59 kg event at the 2022 World Weightlifting Championships held in Bogotá, Colombia. In 2021, she won the silver medal in her event at the World Weightlifting Championships held in Tashkent, Uzbekistan.

== Career ==
Álvarez won two gold medals at the 2022 Bolivarian Games held in Valledupar, Colombia. She won the gold medal in her event at the 2022 South American Games held in Asunción, Paraguay.

Álvarez won the gold medal in the women's 59 kg event at the 2023 Pan American Games held in Santiago, Chile.

In August 2024, Álvarez competed in the women's 59 kg event at the 2024 Summer Olympics held in Paris, France. She lifted 105 kg in the Snatch sharing third provisional place but then failed three attempts in the Clean & Jerk.

== Achievements ==
Year	Venue	Weight	Snatch (kg)				Clean & Jerk (kg)				Total	Rank
Year	Venue	Weight	1	2	3	Rank	1	2	3	Rank	Total	Rank
Representing Colombia
Olympic Games
2024	Paris, France	59 kg	101	103	105	3	~~130~~	~~132~~	~~132~~	—N/a	—N/a	—N/a
World Championships
2014	Almaty, Kazakhstan	58 kg	95	100	~~103~~	3rd place, bronze medalist(s)	118	122	125	3rd place, bronze medalist(s)	225	4
2021	Tashkent, Uzbekistan	59 kg	95	99	~~101~~	4	~~123~~	123	127	2nd place, silver medalist(s)	226	2nd place, silver medalist(s)
2022	Bogotá, Colombia	59 kg	~~98~~	98	101	6	128	131	133 AM	1st place, gold medalist(s)	234 AM	1st place, gold medalist(s)
2023	Riyadh, Saudi Arabia	59 kg	100	~~103~~	~~103~~	6	129	~~132~~	~~132~~	5	229	5
2024	Manama, Bahrain	59 kg	98	~~100~~	~~100~~	4	123	126	—	3rd place, bronze medalist(s)	224	3rd place, bronze medalist(s)
IWF World Cup
2024	Phuket, Thailand	59 kg	~~98~~	98	100	12	125	~~130~~	~~130~~	9	225	9
Pan American Games
2023	Santiago, Chile	59 kg	97	100	102	—N/a	~~126~~	126	~~134~~	—N/a	228	1st place, gold medalist(s)
Pan American Championships
2016	Cartagena, Colombia	58 kg	95	98	100	1st place, gold medalist(s)	118	120	124	1st place, gold medalist(s)	224	1st place, gold medalist(s)
2021	Guayaquil, Ecuador	59 kg	95	98	100	1st place, gold medalist(s)	122	126	130	1st place, gold medalist(s)	230	1st place, gold medalist(s)
2022	Bogotá, Colombia	59 kg	97	100	102 AM	1st place, gold medalist(s)	~~124~~	124	~~128~~	1st place, gold medalist(s)	226	1st place, gold medalist(s)
2024	Caracas, Venezuela	59 kg	96	~~100~~	—	5	—	—	—	—N/a	—N/a	—N/a
Central American and Caribbean Games
2014	Veracruz, Mexico	58 kg	95	97	99	1st place, gold medalist(s)	117	~~121~~	123	1st place, gold medalist(s)	—N/a	—N/a
2023	San Salvador, El Salvador	59 kg	96	99	~~103~~	1st place, gold medalist(s)	125	130	~~131~~	1st place, gold medalist(s)	—N/a	—N/a
South American Games
2014	Santiago, Chile	58 kg	87	~~90~~	~~90~~	—N/a	110	113	~~116~~	—N/a	200	3rd place, bronze medalist(s)
2022	Asunción, Paraguay	59 kg	90	94	96	—N/a	120	124	—	—N/a	220	1st place, gold medalist(s)
Bolivarian Games
2022	Valledupar, Colombia	59 kg	95	98	—	1st place, gold medalist(s)	120	125	—	1st place, gold medalist(s)	—N/a	—N/a
Junior World Championships
2013	Lima, Peru	53 kg	~~80~~	83	~~86~~	4	100	~~105~~	~~106~~	4	183	4
2014	Kazan, Russia	58 kg	90	94	~~97~~	3rd place, bronze medalist(s)	115	~~119~~	119	1st place, gold medalist(s)	213	2nd place, silver medalist(s)
Youth World Championships
2012	Košice, Slovakia	53 kg	73	77	~~80~~	1st place, gold medalist(s)	91	97	100	2nd place, silver medalist(s)	177	2nd place, silver medalist(s)
