= Weightlifting at the 2024 Summer Olympics – Women's 59 kg =

Women's 59 kg at the Games of the XXXIII Olympiad
- Venue: Paris Expo Porte de Versailles
- Date: 8 August 2024
- Competitors: 12 from 12 nations
- Winning total: 241 kg OR

Medalists
1st place, gold medalist(s)		Luo Shifang	China
2nd place, silver medalist(s)		Maude Charron	Canada
3rd place, bronze medalist(s)		Kuo Hsing-chun	Chinese Taipei

The Women's 59 kg weightlifting competitions at the 2024 Summer Olympics in Paris took place on 8 August at the Paris Expo Porte de Versailles.

== Records ==
{{{caption}}}
World Record	Snatch	Kim Il-gyong (PRK)	111 kg	Hangzhou, China	2 October 2023
World Record	Clean & Jerk	Kuo Hsing-chun (TPE)	140 kg	Pattaya, Thailand	21 September 2019
World Record	Total	Luo Shifang (CHN)	248 kg	Phuket, Thailand	3 April 2024
Olympic Record	Snatch	Kuo Hsing-chun (TPE)	103 kg	Tokyo, Japan	27 July 2021
Olympic Record	Clean & Jerk	Kuo Hsing-chun (TPE)	133 kg	Tokyo, Japan	27 July 2021
Olympic Record	Total	Kuo Hsing-chun (TPE)	236 kg	Tokyo, Japan	27 July 2021

The following Olympic records were established during the competition:

Category	Athlete	New record	Type
Snatch	Kamila Konotop (UKR)	104 kg	OR
Snatch	Luo Shifang (CHN)	105 kg	OR
Snatch	Maude Charron (CAN)	106 kg	OR
Snatch	Luo Shifang (CHN)	107 kg	OR
Clean & Jerk	Luo Shifang (CHN)	134 kg	OR
Total	Luo Shifang (CHN)	241 kg	OR

== Results ==
Rank	Athlete	Nation	Snatch (kg)				Clean & Jerk (kg)				Total
Rank	Athlete	Nation	1	2	3	Result	1	2	3	Result	Total
1st place, gold medalist(s)	Luo Shifang	China	101	105	107	107 OR	129	134	~~137~~	134 OR	241 OR
2nd place, silver medalist(s)	Maude Charron	Canada	101	104	106	106	126	130	~~132~~	130	236
3rd place, bronze medalist(s)	Kuo Hsing-chun	Chinese Taipei	103	~~105~~	105	105	~~130~~	130	~~137~~	130	235
4	Anyelin Venegas	Venezuela	97	100	102	102	122	128	~~134~~	128	230
5	Rafiatu Lawal	Nigeria	100	~~103~~	~~103~~	100	~~125~~	~~127~~	130	130	230
6	Elreen Ando	Philippines	~~100~~	100	~~102~~	100	~~130~~	~~130~~	130	130	230
7	Kamila Konotop	Ukraine	104	~~106~~	~~106~~	104	123	~~129~~	~~132~~	123	227
8	Janeth Gómez	Mexico	~~92~~	92	95	95	114	119	122	122	217
9	Dora Tchakounté	France	95	98	~~100~~	98	115	~~118~~	—	115	213
10	Mattie Sasser	Marshall Islands	~~94~~	~~94~~	94	94	110	115	~~118~~	115	209
11	Lucrezia Magistris	Italy	~~96~~	96	~~100~~	96	~~111~~	~~112~~	112	112	208
—	Yenny Álvarez	Colombia	101	103	105	105	~~130~~	~~132~~	~~132~~	—	DNF
