= Joanna Łochowska =

Polish weightlifter (born 1988)

Personal information
- Born: November 17, 1988 (age 37) Zielona Góra, Poland

Sport
- Country: Poland
- Sport: Weightlifting
Medal record
European Championships
Gold medal – first place	2017 Split	– 53 kg
Gold medal – first place	2018 Bucharest	– 53 kg
Gold medal – first place	2019 Batumi	– 53 kg
Bronze medal – third place	2016 Førde	– 58 kg

Joanna Łochowska (born November 17, 1988, in Zielona Góra) is a Polish weightlifter. She competed at the 2012 Summer Olympics in the Women's 53 kg, finishing 11th.

== Major results ==
Year	Venue	Weight	Snatch (kg)				Clean & Jerk (kg)				Total	Rank
Year	Venue	Weight	1	2	3	Rank	1	2	3	Rank	Total	Rank
Olympic Games
2012	London, United Kingdom	53 kg	84	~~87~~	~~87~~	9	104	107	~~110~~	10	191	11
World Championships
2019	Pattaya, Thailand	55 kg	80	83	85	18	107	110	~~113~~	8	195	12
2018	Ashgabat, Turkmenistan	55 kg	88	~~90~~	~~90~~	12	108	~~111~~	~~112~~	16	196	17
2017	Anaheim, United States	53 kg	87	~~89~~	~~89~~	4	108	111	~~115~~	4	198	5
2015	Houston, United States	58 kg	90	~~90~~	94	8	110	~~113~~	~~114~~	19	204	13
2014	Almaty, Kazakhstan	58 kg	~~90~~	90	93	7	~~112~~	112	~~116~~	11	205	10
2013	Wrocław, Poland	58 kg	88	92	~~94~~	8	110	115	~~118~~	7	207	6
2011	Paris, France	53 kg	~~83~~	~~83~~	83	15	103	~~105~~	107	14	190	16
2009	Goyang, South Korea	53 kg	~~83~~	83	~~86~~	11	103	~~106~~	106	10	189	10
European Weightlifting Championships
2021	Moscow, Russia	55 kg	81	~~84~~	84	8	102	106	~~108~~	6	190	7
2019	(Georgia (country)) Batumi, Georgia	55 kg	~~87~~	87	~~90~~	3rd place, bronze medalist(s)	107	112	—	1st place, gold medalist(s)	199	1st place, gold medalist(s)
2018	Bucharest, Romania	53 kg	85	88	~~90~~	1st place, gold medalist(s)	105	~~108~~	108	1st place, gold medalist(s)	196	1st place, gold medalist(s)
2017	Split, Croatia	53 kg	84	86	~~89~~	1st place, gold medalist(s)	104	106	—	1st place, gold medalist(s)	192	1st place, gold medalist(s)
2016	Førde, Norway	58 kg	~~90~~	~~90~~	90	3rd place, bronze medalist(s)	110	112	114	3rd place, bronze medalist(s)	204	3rd place, bronze medalist(s)
2015	(Georgia (country)) Tbilisi, Georgia	58 kg	87	90	~~92~~	4	108	~~112~~	~~112~~	7	198	5
2014	Tel Aviv, Israel	58 kg	88	~~91~~	91	4	112	~~115~~	~~115~~	5	203	4
2013	Tirana, Albania	58 kg	85	88	90	6	~~107~~	107	~~111~~	4	197	6
2012	(Turkey) Antalya, Albania	53 kg	82	84	86	6	~~103~~	103	~~106~~	7	189	6
2010	Minsk, Belarus	53 kg	83	~~85~~	~~85~~	6	103	~~108~~	~~108~~	6	186	6
2009	Bucharest, Romania	53 kg	81	~~84~~	~~84~~	4	100	103	~~106~~	4	184	4
