= 2013 World Weightlifting Championships – Women's 58 kg =

The women's competition in the –58 kg division was held on 22 October 2013 in Centennial Hall, Wrocław, Poland.

== Schedule ==
Date	Time	Event
22 October 2013	12:00	Group B
22 October 2013	16:55	Group A

== Medalists ==
Event	Gold		Silver		Bronze	
Snatch	Deng Wei (CHN)	108 kg	Kuo Hsing-chun (TPE)	108 kg	Alexandra Escobar (ECU)	103 kg
Clean & Jerk	Kuo Hsing-chun (TPE)	133 kg	Alexandra Escobar (ECU)	122 kg	Elena Shadrina (RUS)	122 kg
Total	Kuo Hsing-chun (TPE)	241 kg	Alexandra Escobar (ECU)	225 kg	Elena Shadrina (RUS)	218 kg

== Records ==
Prior to this competition, the existing world records were as follows.

World Record	Snatch	Chen Yanqing (CHN)	111 kg	Doha, Qatar	3 December 2006
World Record	Clean & Jerk	Qiu Hongmei (CHN)	141 kg	Tai'an, China	23 April 2007
World Record	Total	Chen Yanqing (CHN)	251 kg	Doha, Qatar	3 December 2006

== Results ==
Rank	Athlete	Group	Body weight	Snatch (kg)				Clean & Jerk (kg)				Total
Rank	Athlete	Group	Body weight	1	2	3	Rank	1	2	3	Rank	Total
1st place, gold medalist(s)	Kuo Hsing-chun (TPE)	A	57.73	103	106	108	2nd place, silver medalist(s)	133	~~136~~	~~136~~	1st place, gold medalist(s)	241
2nd place, silver medalist(s)	Alexandra Escobar (ECU)	A	57.32	98	103	~~106~~	3rd place, bronze medalist(s)	~~120~~	120	122	2nd place, silver medalist(s)	225
3rd place, bronze medalist(s)	Elena Shadrina (RUS)	A	57.59	93	~~96~~	96	5	115	119	122	3rd place, bronze medalist(s)	218
4	Loredana Toma (ROU)	A	57.92	91	95	~~98~~	6	111	116	118	5	213
5	Yuliya Kalina (UKR)	A	57.84	94	~~96~~	~~97~~	7	114	~~118~~	118	4	212
6	Joanna Łochowska (POL)	A	57.61	88	92	~~94~~	8	110	115	~~118~~	7	207
7	Mikiko Ando (JPN)	A	57.70	86	90	~~92~~	10	113	117	~~121~~	6	207
8	Saule Saduakassova (KAZ)	B	57.41	83	87	90	9	~~105~~	105	110	8	200
9	Quisia Guicho (MEX)	A	57.97	85	88	~~90~~	11	108	~~113~~	~~113~~	9	196
10	Jennifer Hernández (ECU)	B	57.85	~~80~~	80	84	12	102	106	~~111~~	10	190
11	Cortney Batchelor (USA)	B	57.51	~~80~~	80	~~85~~	13	100	~~105~~	~~105~~	11	180
12	Angelica Roos (SWE)	B	57.27	~~77~~	78	~~80~~	14	98	~~102~~	~~102~~	12	176
13	Ruby Malvina (SEY)	B	57.58	~~65~~	65	~~70~~	15	90	95	~~100~~	13	160
—	Deng Wei (CHN)	A	57.27	105	~~108~~	108	1st place, gold medalist(s)	~~133~~	~~133~~	~~133~~	—	—
—	Ri Jong-hwa (PRK)	A	57.74	103	~~107~~	~~107~~	4	~~132~~	~~132~~	~~132~~	—	—
