= Weightlifting at the 2016 Summer Olympics – Women's 58 kg =

Women's 58 kg at the Games of the XXXI Olympiad
- Venue: Riocentro
- Date: 8 August 2016
- Competitors: 16 from 15 nations
- Winning total: 240 kg

Medalists
1st place, gold medalist(s)		Sukanya Srisurat	Thailand
2nd place, silver medalist(s)		Pimsiri Sirikaew	Thailand
3rd place, bronze medalist(s)		Kuo Hsing-chun	Chinese Taipei

The Women's 58 kg weightlifting competitions at the 2016 Summer Olympics in Rio de Janeiro took place on 8 August at the Pavilion 2 of Riocentro.

== Schedule ==
All times are Time in Brazil (UTC-03:00)

Date	Time	Event
8 August 2016	12:30	Group B
8 August 2016	15:30	Group A

== Records ==
Prior to this competition, the existing world and Olympic records were as follows.

World record	Snatch	Boyanka Kostova (AZE)	112 kg	Houston, United States	23 November 2015
World record	Clean & Jerk	Qiu Hongmei (CHN)	141 kg	Tai'an, China	23 April 2007
World record	Total	Boyanka Kostova (AZE)	252 kg	Houston, United States	23 November 2015
Olympic record	Snatch	Li Xueying (CHN)	108 kg	London, United Kingdom	30 July 2012
Olympic record	Clean & Jerk	Chen Yanqing (CHN)	138 kg	Beijing, China	11 August 2008
Olympic record	Total	Li Xueying (CHN)	246 kg	London, United Kingdom	30 July 2012

== Results ==
Rank	Athlete	Nation	Group	Body weight	Snatch (kg)				Clean & Jerk (kg)				Total
Rank	Athlete	Nation	Group	Body weight	1	2	3	Result	1	2	3	Result	Total
1st place, gold medalist(s)	Sukanya Srisurat	Thailand	A	56.89	105	108	110	110 OR	127	130	~~132~~	130	240
2nd place, silver medalist(s)	Pimsiri Sirikaew	Thailand	A	57.40	98	100	102	102	128	130	—	130	232
3rd place, bronze medalist(s)	Kuo Hsing-chun	Chinese Taipei	A	57.86	102	~~105~~	~~105~~	102	~~129~~	129	~~139~~	129	231
4	Alexandra Escobar	Ecuador	A	57.23	97	100	~~102~~	100	118	121	123	123	223
5	Mikiko Ando	Japan	A	57.56	90	~~93~~	94	94	120	124	~~126~~	124	218
6	Yuderqui Contreras	Dominican Republic	A	57.58	96	100	~~102~~	100	117	~~121~~	~~122~~	117	217
7	Lina Rivas	Colombia	A	57.92	96	~~100~~	~~100~~	96	116	120	~~122~~	120	216
8	Patricia Domínguez	Mexico	A	57.47	91	94	96	96	115	~~118~~	~~119~~	115	211
9	Yusleidy Figueroa	Venezuela	A	57.71	85	~~89~~	~~89~~	85	110	116	—	116	201
10	Sabine Kusterer	Germany	B	57.70	87	89	90	90	108	~~110~~	110	110	200
11	Mathlynn Sasser	Marshall Islands	B	56.80	82	84	87	87	110	~~112~~	112	112	199
12	Angelica Roos	Sweden	B	57.90	84	~~87~~	~~87~~	84	107	110	~~112~~	110	194
13	Veronika Ivasiuk	Ukraine	B	57.10	~~87~~	87	90	90	98	103	~~107~~	103	193
14	Tia-Clair Toomey	Australia	B	57.70	78	~~82~~	82	82	103	107	~~112~~	107	189
15	Jenly Tegu Wini	Solomon Islands	B	57.50	80	84	~~87~~	84	100	104	~~109~~	104	188
16	Ayesha Al-Balooshi	United Arab Emirates	B	57.00	67	70	72	72	86	90	~~94~~	90	162

== New records ==
Snatch	110 kg	Sukanya Srisurat (THA)	OR
