= Choe Hyo-sim =

North Korean weightlifter (born 1993)

Personal information
- Nationality: North Korean
- Born: 5 December 1993 (age 32)
- Height: 1.59 m (5 ft 3 in)
- Weight: 58.95 kg (130 lb)

Sport
- Country: North Korea
- Sport: Weightlifting
- Event: –59 kg
- Club: Kigwancha Sports Club
Medal record
Representing North Korea
Olympic Games
Silver medal – second place	2016 Rio	–63 kg
World Championships
Silver medal – second place	2019 Pattaya	–59 kg

Korean name
- Hangul: 최효심
- RR: Choe Hyosim
- MR: Ch'oe Hyosim

Choe Hyo-sim (Korean: 최효심; pronounced [tsʰø.ɦjo.ɕim] or [tsʰø] [hjo.ɕim]; born 5 December 1993) is a North Korean weightlifter. She competed at the 2016 Summer Olympics in Rio de Janeiro, and won a silver medal in the women's 63 kg. She won the silver medal at the 2013 Summer Universiade.

Choe represents the Kigwancha Sports Club.

== Major results ==
Year	Venue	Weight	Snatch (kg)				Clean & Jerk (kg)				Total	Rank
Year	Venue	Weight	1	2	3	Rank	1	2	3	Rank	Total	Rank
Summer Olympics
2016	Rio de Janeiro, Brazil	63 kg	105	~~109~~	~~111~~	105	135	138	143	143	248	2nd place, silver medalist(s)
Summer Universiade
2013	Kazan, Russia	58 kg	95	98	100	---	123	~~125~~	125	---	225	2nd place, silver medalist(s)
