= Alexandra Escobar =

Ecuadorian weightlifter (born 1980)

Personal information
- Full name: María Alexandra Escobar Guerrero
- Born: 17 July 1980 (age 45) Esmeraldas, Ecuador
- Height: 1.58 m (5 ft 2 in)
- Weight: 58 kg (128 lb)

Sport
- Country: Ecuador
- Sport: Weightlifting
- Event: 58 kg
- Club: Federación Deportiva de Esmeraldas
- Coached by: Javier Perez Rosas
Medal record
World Championships
Silver medal – second place	2013 Wrocław	–58 kg
Bronze medal – third place	2001 Antalya	–53 kg
Pan American Games
Gold medal – first place	2007 Rio de Janeiro	–58 kg
Gold medal – first place	2011 Guadalajara	–58 kg
Silver medal – second place	2019 Lima	–59 kg
Pan American Championships
Gold medal – first place	2008 Callao	–58 kg
Gold medal – first place	2010 Guatemala City	–58 kg
South American Games
Gold medal – first place	2010 Medellín	–58 kg

María Alexandra Escobar Guerrero (born 17 July 1980) is an Ecuadorian weightlifter.

At the 2001 World Weightlifting Championships in Antalya, Turkey she won gold in the 53 kg category in the clean and jerk, bronze in the snatch, and the overall bronze medal with a total lift of 205 kg.

She ranked 7th in the Woman's 58 kg category at the 2004 Summer Olympics, lifting 215 kg in total.

At the 2006 World Weightlifting Championships she ranked 16th in the 58 kg category, and at the 2007 World Weightlifting Championships she ranked 5th in the same category, lifting a total of 220 kg.

Escobar won the gold medal in the 58 kg category at the 2008 Pan American Weightlifting Championships.

Escobar has competed five times at the Olympics in the women's 58 kg weight class. In the 2004 Summer Olympics she finished 7th with a 215 kg total. At Beijing 2008 she ranked 4th with 223 kg in total. At the 2012 Summer Olympics she finished 7th with a total of 226 kg. At the 2016 Summer Olympics she finished 4th (223 kg) and at the 2020 Summer Olympics she recorded a DNF.

Escobar was the Ecuadorian flag-bearer in the opening ceremonies for the 2004, 2008 and 2020 Olympic Games.

== Early life ==
Escobar's parents struggled to support her, and soon sent her to be raised by her aunt Luisa Marquez. It was Luisa's daughter, Adela Marquez, who introduced Escobar to the sport of weightlifting. From an early age Escobar knew that sports would likely present the best opportunity to escape the poverty she had inherited at birth.

Escobar was found by a local coach in Esmeraldas named Silvio Mila. Mila practically refused to let Escobar walk away from the sport, and just four months after beginning to train in the sport she won her first medal and was shortly thereafter invited to join the Ecuadorian Weightlifting team. Escobar first found international success in 2001 at the World Championships in Antalya, Turkey where she won a gold medal in the 53 kg Clean & Jerk event. Escobar has also found considerable success on her home continent winning 18 gold medals in various major South American competitions. She has competed in three Olympic Games all in the 58 kg event, and is currently working towards qualifying for the 2016 games to be held in Rio de Janeiro, Brazil. Escobar and her husband Dario Xavier Garcia have one son, Dominic Ramses Garcia. She is currently coached by the Cuban Javier Perez Rosas, and trains in her home town of Esmeraldas. The government has provided her with facilities to train in and a monthly stipend to allow her to focus solely on weightlifting.

== Pan American Championships ==
While Alexandra Escobar has competed in three Olympic Games and several World Championships her greatest success has undoubtedly come at the Pan American Championships. She first appeared on the Pan American stage in 2008 at the games held in Callao, Peru when she swept the 58 kg events, winning three gold medals 1 each in the 58 kg, the 58 kg – snatch, and the 58 kg – clean & jerk. Since the 2008 games in Callao Escobar has won 10 gold medals, 2 silvers, and 1 bronze. Making that even more impressive, she won back to back to back gold medals in both the 58 kg and the 58 kg – clean & jerk during the 2008, 2009 and 2010 games. Escobar is showing no signs of slowing down either having recently won gold medals in 58 kg, the 58 kg – snatch and the 58 kg – clean & jerk events at the 2013 games held in Caracas, Venezuela.

== Olympic Games ==
Alexandra Escobar's dream is to win an Olympic medal, and she has competed in five games so far. She first competed in the Olympics in 2004 in Athens, Greece. She then returned in the 2008 games in Beijing, China. Finally, she competed in London, England during the 2012 games. Prior to the 2012 games, Escobar said:

What I really want is to step up onto the podium and hear my country's national anthem. I've won medals at all the other major competitions – the South American, Bolivian and Pan American Games, and the World Championships. The only thing I don't have is the Olympic medal, which is why I'm going to give it everything I have to win one in London.

Escobar has yet to accomplish this goal as her best finish so far was fourth place in the 2008 and 2016 games. In the opening ceremony of the 2008 games, Escobar was the flag bearer for her home country Ecuador. Escobar considers this a great honor that was bestowed upon her. Her other finishes in the Olympics were 7th place in 2004 and 9th in 2012. After the disappointing finish in London, there was some speculation that Escobar would retire as she has spoken about an interest in coaching and studying sports science. However this soon proved false as she has returned to competitions in 2013.

== World Championships ==
Alexandra Escobar has competed in eight World Championships. She has won one gold medal, in 2001, and has finished second on two occasions, both occurring in the 2013 games held in Wroclaw, Poland. She has also won four bronze medals, in 2001, 2003 and 2013. Her medals have all came in the 58 kg, 58 kg – snatch and 58 kg – clean & jerk events.

== Controversy ==
In October 2003, Escobar threatened to boycott the World Championships that were being held in Vancouver, Canada later that year unless the governing committee canceled a twenty thousand dollar fine that was imposed on a fellow competitor. Ultimately, the issue was resolved and Escobar attended the games winning a bronze medal in the 58 kg – snatch event. This event painted Escobar as a martyr in the eyes of the weightlifting community and garnered her significant respect among her fellow competitors.

== Major results ==
Year	Venue	Weight	Snatch (kg)				Clean & Jerk (kg)				Total	Rank
Year	Venue	Weight	1	2	3	Rank	1	2	3	Rank	Total	Rank
Olympic Games
2004	Athens, Greece	58 kg	95.0	~~100.0~~	~~100.0~~	6	115.0	120.0	~~122.5~~	7	215.0	7
2008	Beijing, China	58 kg	~~96~~	96	99	2	120	124	~~127~~	4	223	4
2012	(United Kingdom) London, England	58 kg	~~100~~	100	103	2	123	~~127~~	~~127~~	8	226	7
2016	Rio de Janeiro, Brazil	58 kg	97	100	~~102~~	4	118	121	123	5	223	4
2020	Tokyo, Japan	59 kg	~~95~~	~~95~~	~~95~~	-	-	-	-	-	-	DNF
World Championships
2001	Antalya, Turkey	53 kg	85.0	~~90.0~~	90.0	3rd place, bronze medalist(s)	~~110.0~~	110.0	115.0	1st place, gold medalist(s)	205.0	3rd place, bronze medalist(s)
2002	Warsaw, Poland	53 kg	87.5	~~90.0~~	~~92.5~~	6	~~110.0~~	~~110.0~~	~~110.0~~	-	-	DNF
2003	Vancouver, Canada	58 kg	~~90.0~~	90.0	92.5	3rd place, bronze medalist(s)	110.0	115.0	~~120.0~~	5	207.5	4
2006	Santo Domingo, Dominican Republic	58 kg	82	~~85~~	85	15	~~103~~	~~103~~	103	19	188	16
2007	Chang Mai, Thailand	58 kg	95	99	~~101~~	4	118	121	~~124~~	6	220	5
2010	Antalya, Turkey	58 kg	95	~~100~~	100	4	120	124	127	4	227	4
2011	Paris, France	58 kg	~~95~~	95	~~98~~	6	117	~~120~~	-	10	212	9
2013	Wrocław, Poland	58 kg	98	103	~~106~~	3rd place, bronze medalist(s)	~~120~~	120	122	2nd place, silver medalist(s)	225	2nd place, silver medalist(s)
2014	Almaty, Kazakhstan	63 kg	100	104	105	11	122	~~127~~	~~127~~	14	227	13
2015	Houston, United States	58 kg	94	~~97~~	97	5	117	120	~~124~~	8	217	6
2017	Anaheim, United States	58 kg	93	96	~~99~~	5	116	119	122	3rd place, bronze medalist(s)	218	5
2018	Ashgabat, Turkmenistan	55 kg	91	93	~~95~~	5	113	~~116~~	116	6	209	7
2019	Pattaya, Thailand	59 kg	85	87	90	17	105	110	115	13	205	13
2021	Tashkent, Uzbekistan	59 kg	85	90	~~92~~	9	112	~~116~~	~~116~~	9	202	8

Olympic Games
Preceded by Martha Tenorio	Flag bearer for Ecuador; Athens 2004 Beijing 2008	Succeeded by César de Cesare
Preceded by Klaus Jungbluth	Flag bearer for Ecuador; Tokyo 2020; With: Julio Castillo	Succeeded by Sarah Escobar
