= Muattar Nabieva =

Uzbekistani weightlifter (born 1996)

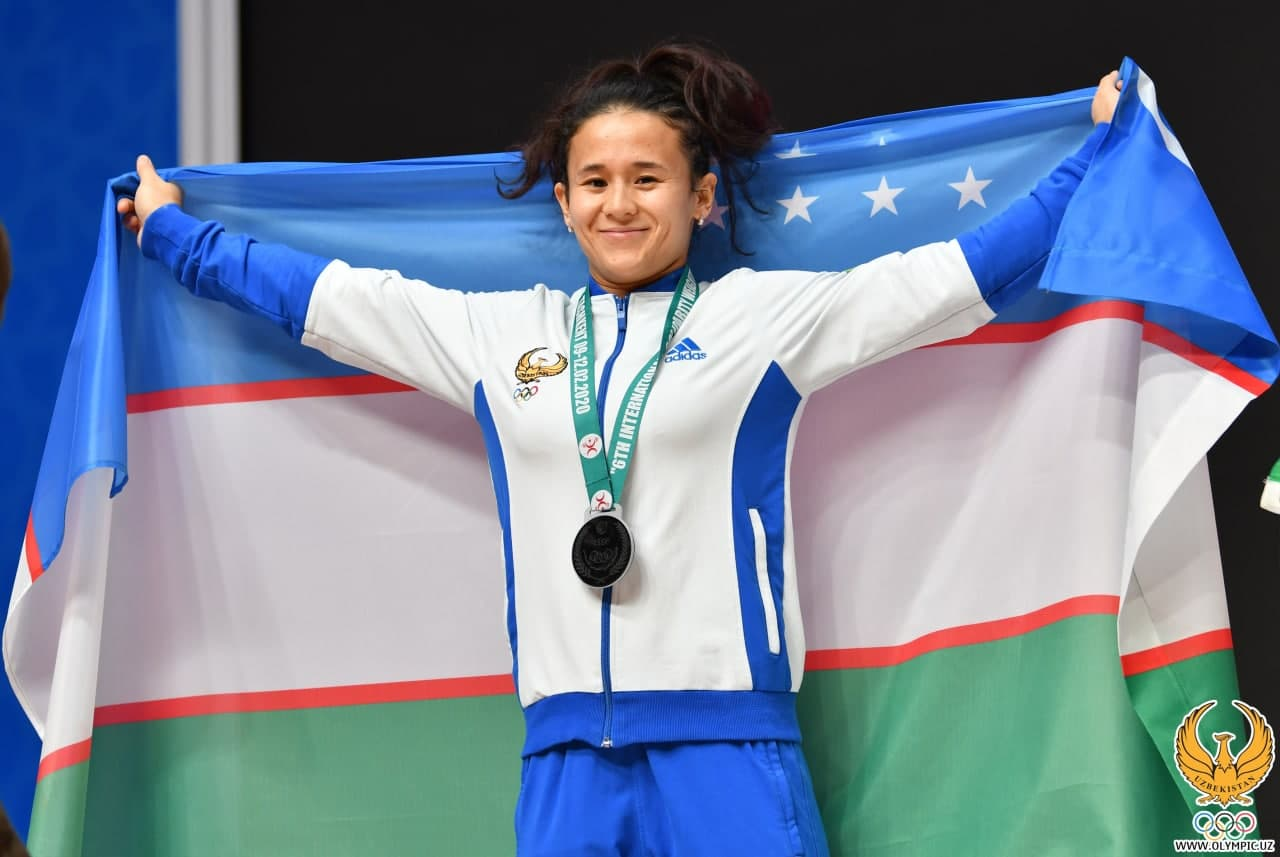

Personal information
- Born: 2 June 1996 (age 30)

Sport
- Country: Uzbekistan
- Sport: Weightlifting
Medal record
Women's weightlifting
Representing Uzbekistan
Islamic Solidarity Games
| Bronze medal – third place | 2017 Baku | 58 kg |
Asian Indoor and Martial Arts Games
| Silver medal – second place | 2017 Ashgabat | 58 kg |
Asian Championships
| Bronze medal – third place | 2019 Ningbo | 55 kg |
| Bronze medal – third place | 2020 Tashkent | 55 kg |

Muattar Nabieva (born 2 June 1996) is an Uzbekistani weightlifter. She is a bronze medalist at the Islamic Solidarity Games and a two-time bronze medalist at the Asian Weightlifting Championships. In 2021, she represented Uzbekistan at the 2020 Summer Olympics in Tokyo, Japan. In 2018, she represented Uzbekistan at the Asian Games in Jakarta, Indonesia.

== Career ==
Nabieva competed in the women's 58 kg event at the 2015 World Weightlifting Championships held in Houston, United States. At the 2017 Islamic Solidarity Games held in Baku, Azerbaijan, she won the bronze medal in the women's 58 kg event. At the 2017 Asian Indoor and Martial Arts Games held in Ashgabat, Turkmenistan, she won the silver medal in the women's 58 kg event.

In 2018, Nabieva competed in the women's 58 kg event at the Asian Games held in Jakarta, Indonesia. She finished in 4th place. At the 2018 World Weightlifting Championships in Ashgabat, Turkmenistan, she won the bronze medal in the women's 55 kg Snatch event. She repeated this in the women's 55 kg Snatch event at the 2019 World Weightlifting Championships held in Pattaya, Thailand.

At the 2019 Asian Weightlifting Championships held in Ningbo, China, she won the bronze medal in the women's 55 kg event. In the same year, she also won the gold medal in the women's 55 kg event at the 6th International Qatar Cup held in Doha, Qatar.

In 2021, Nabieva won the bronze medal in the women's 55 kg event at the 2020 Asian Weightlifting Championships held in Tashkent, Uzbekistan. In July 2021, she represented Uzbekistan at the 2020 Summer Olympics in Tokyo, Japan. She finished in 4th place in the women's 55 kg event. She also set a new Olympic Record of 98 kg in the Snatch event.

== Achievements ==
| Year | Venue | Weight | Snatch (kg) | | | | Clean & Jerk (kg) | | | | Total | Rank |
| Year | Venue | Weight | 1 | 2 | 3 | Rank | 1 | 2 | 3 | Rank | Total | Rank |
Summer Olympics
| 2021 | Tokyo, Japan | 55 kg | 95 | ~~98~~ | 98 OR | —N/a | ~~114~~ | 114 | ~~117~~ | —N/a | 212 | 4 |
World Championships
| 2018 | Ashgabat, Turkmenistan | 55 kg | 90 | 94 | 98 | 3rd place, bronze medalist(s) | 110 | 114 | ~~119~~ | 8 | 212 | 4 |
| 2019 | Pattaya, Thailand | 55 kg | ~~92~~ | 93 | 96 | 3rd place, bronze medalist(s) | ~~112~~ | ~~113~~ | 113 | 6 | 209 | 6 |
Asian Games
| 2018 | Jakarta, Indonesia | 58 kg | ~~95~~ | 95 | 98 | —N/a | 115 | ~~119~~ | 119 | —N/a | 217 | 4 |
Islamic Solidarity Games
| 2017 | Baku, Azerbaijan | 58 kg | 85 | ~~89~~ | 89 | —N/a | 103 | 107 | ~~111~~ | —N/a | 196 | 3rd place, bronze medalist(s) |
Asian Indoor and Martial Arts Games
| 2017 | Ashgabat, Turkmenistan | 58 kg | ~~90~~ | 90 | 94 | —N/a | 110 | 114 | 118 | —N/a | 212 | 2nd place, silver medalist(s) |
