= Angelica Roos =

Swedish weightlifter (born 1989)

Personal information
- Full name: Anna Angelica Ulrika Roos
- Nationality: Swedish
- Born: 15 April 1989 (age 37)
- Height: 1.58 m (5 ft 2 in)
- Weight: 58 kg (128 lb)

Sport
- Country: Sweden
- Sport: Weightlifting
- Event: Women's 58 kg
Medal record
Representing Sweden
European Championships
Silver medal – second place	2018 Bucharest	–58 kg

Anna Angelica Ulrika Roos (born 15 April 1989) is a Swedish weightlifter, who competed in the 58 kg category and represented Sweden at international competitions. She participated in the women's 58 kg event at the 2016 Summer Olympics. She competed at European Weightlifting Championships most recently at the 2016 European Weightlifting Championships.

== Major results ==
Year	Venue	Weight	Snatch (kg)				Clean & Jerk (kg)				Total	Rank
Year	Venue	Weight	1	2	3	Rank	1	2	3	Rank	Total	Rank
Representing Sweden
Olympic Games
2016	Rio de Janeiro, Brazil	58 kg	84	~~87~~	~~87~~	14	107	110	~~112~~	12	194	12
World Championships
2017	Anaheim, United States	63 kg	~~85~~	~~85~~	~~86~~	—	—	—	—	—	—	—
2015	Houston, United States	58 kg	84	~~87~~	~~87~~	24	109	~~113~~	113	14	197	19
2013	Wrocław, Poland	58 kg	~~77~~	78	~~80~~	14	98	~~102~~	~~102~~	12	176	12
European Championships
2018	Bucharest, Romania	58 kg	83	85	~~86~~	3rd place, bronze medalist(s)	104	~~106~~	106	2nd place, silver medalist(s)	191	2nd place, silver medalist(s)
2017	Split, Croatia	58 kg	85	87	88	8	109	113	~~115~~	6	201	8
2016	Førde, Norway	58 kg	85	~~87~~	87	6	~~110~~	110	~~114~~	5	197	5
2015	(Georgia (country)) Tbilisi, Georgia	58 kg	83	86	~~88~~	7	105	109	~~113~~	6	195	8
2014	Tel Aviv, Israel	58 kg	80	83	~~85~~	9	~~104~~	104	~~107~~	8	187	9
2013	Tirana, Albania	58 kg	75	~~79~~	79	8	96	~~100~~	101	9	180	8
2012	Antalya, Turkey	58 kg	70	74	~~76~~	14	91	95	98	13	172	12
Universiade
2013	Kazan, Russia	58 kg	75	~~78~~	78	9	95	~~100~~	103	7	181	8
