= Rebeka Ibrahima =

Latvian weightlifter (born 1998)

Rebeka Koha
Personal information
- Nationality: Latvia
- Born: 19 May 1998 (age 28) Ventspils, Latvia
- Height: 1.60 m (5 ft 3 in)
- Weight: 58.70 kg (129 lb)

Sport
- Country: Latvia; Qatar
- Sport: Weightlifting
- Event: –59 kg
- Coached by: Eduards Andruškevičs

Achievements and titles
- Personal bests: Snatch: 103 kg (2018); Clean & Jerk: 124 kg (2018); Total: 227 kg (2018)
Medal record
Representing Qatar
West Asian Championships
Gold medal – first place	2022 Doha	–59 kg
Representing Latvia
World Championships
Bronze medal – third place	2017 Anaheim	–58 kg
Bronze medal – third place	2018 Ashgabat	–59 kg
European Championships
Gold medal – first place	2018 Bucharest	–58 kg
Gold medal – first place	2019 Batumi	–59 kg
Silver medal – second place	2017 Split	–58 kg
Bronze medal – third place	2016 Førde	–53 kg
Bronze medal – third place	2025 Chișinău	–59 kg
Youth Olympics
Bronze medal – third place	2014 Nanjing	–48 kg

Rebeka Salsabil Ibrahim (born Rebeka Koha; 19 May 1998) is a Latvian and Qatari weightlifter, two time Junior World Champion and two time European Champion competing in the 58 kg division until 2018 and 59 kg starting in 2018 after the International Weightlifting Federation reorganized the categories.

She was coached by Eduards Andruškevičs, who has also been coaching Olympic medalist Viktors Ščerbatihs and Artūrs Plēsnieks.

In 2023, Rebeka returned to weightlifting representing Qatar and winning Qatar Cup and West Asian Championships.

== Career ==
She currently has junior world records in the clean & jerk and total in the 59 kg division.

=== Olympics ===
In 2016, she competed at the Summer Olympics in the 53 kg division placing fourth overall. She was named Latvian Rising Star of the Year in 2016 after her performance at the 2016 Summer Olympics.

=== World Championships ===
In 2017, she competed at the World Weightlifting Championships winning the bronze medal in the snatch and total.

In 2018, the IWF restructured the weight classes, and Koha competed in the newly created 59 kg division. She followed up her bronze medal performance in 2017 with stronger performance at the 2018 World Weightlifting Championships winning another bronze medal in the snatch and total and setting junior world records in the snatch, clean & jerk, and total.

=== European Championships ===
In 2016, she competed at the European Weightlifting Championships winning a bronze medal in the total in the 53 kg category. The following year she competed at the 2017 European Weightlifting Championships winning a gold medal in the snatch, and silver medals in the clean & jerk and total in the 58 kg category.

At the 2018 European Weightlifting Championships, Koha swept gold in all lifts (snatch, clean & jerk, and the total) and became European Champion in the 58 kg division.

=== Other Competitions ===
She competed at the 2017 Junior World Weightlifting Championships, winning silver medals in the snatch and clean & jerk, but a gold medal in the total, becoming Junior World Champion in the 58 kg division.

In 2018, coming off her Junior World Championships gold medal, she defended her title as the Junior World Champion by winning gold medals in all lifts at the 2018 Junior World Weightlifting Championships.

== Major results ==
Year	Venue	Weight	Snatch (kg)				Clean & Jerk (kg)				Total	Rank
Year	Venue	Weight	1	2	3	Rank	1	2	3	Rank	Total	Rank
Olympic Games
2016	Rio de Janeiro, Brazil	53 kg	~~87~~	87	90	—N/a	103	107	~~110~~	—N/a	197	4
World Championships
2014	Almaty, Kazakhstan	53 kg	76	78	80	16	92	94	~~96~~	25	174	22
2015	Houston, United States	53 kg	84	86	87	9	101	105	~~107~~	16	192	10
2017	Anaheim, United States	58 kg	94	98	101	3rd place, bronze medalist(s)	114	118	121	5	222	3rd place, bronze medalist(s)
2018	Ashgabat, Turkmenistan	59 kg	98	~~102~~	103	3rd place, bronze medalist(s)	117	121	124	6	227	3rd place, bronze medalist(s)
2019	Pattaya, Thailand	59 kg	92	95	97	4	112	115	118	12	215	8
European Championships
2016	Førde, Norway	53 kg	87	90	~~92~~	2nd place, silver medalist(s)	102	105	108	3rd place, bronze medalist(s)	198	3rd place, bronze medalist(s)
2017	Split, Croatia	58 kg	92	95	~~97~~	1st place, gold medalist(s)	110	114	118	2nd place, silver medalist(s)	213	2nd place, silver medalist(s)
2018	Bucharest, Romania	58 kg	90	95	100	1st place, gold medalist(s)	110	115	120	1st place, gold medalist(s)	220	1st place, gold medalist(s)
2019	Batumi, Georgia	59 kg	97	101	~~104~~	1st place, gold medalist(s)	116	120	~~125~~	1st place, gold medalist(s)	221	1st place, gold medalist(s)
2025	Chișinău, Moldova	59 kg	88	91	93	3rd place, bronze medalist(s)	105	108	113	4	206	3rd place, bronze medalist(s)
Junior World Weightlifting Championships
2017	Tokyo, Japan	58 kg	93	96	99	2nd place, silver medalist(s)	111	117	120	2nd place, silver medalist(s)	219	1st place, gold medalist(s)
2018	Tashkent, Uzbekistan	58 kg	95	99	~~103~~	1st place, gold medalist(s)	113	117	120	1st place, gold medalist(s)	219	1st place, gold medalist(s)
2014 Youth Olympics
2014	Nanjing, China	48 kg	71	73	75	—N/a	86	90	~~94~~	—N/a	165	3rd place, bronze medalist(s)

== Private life ==
In spring of 2020 Koha became engaged with the Qatari discus thrower Moaaz Mohamed Ibrahim and on July 26 announced via her Instagram account she had converted to Islam.

On August 5 of 2020 she announced her retirement from the sport, later deciding to make a comeback for the 2025 European Weightlifting Championships.
