= Sukanya Srisurat =

Thai weightlifter (born 1995)

Personal information
- Nickname: Fai (ฝ้าย)
- Nationality: Thai
- Born: 3 May 1995 (age 31) Si Racha District, Chonburi Province
- Height: 155 cm (5 ft 1 in)
- Weight: 54.50 kg (120 lb)

Sport
- Country: Thailand
- Sport: Weightlifting
- Weight class: –55 kg

Achievements and titles
- Personal bests: Snatch: 110 kg (2016); Clean and jerk: 130 kg (2016); Total: 240 kg (2016)
Medal record
Women's weightlifting
Representing Thailand
| Event | 1st | 2nd | 3rd |
|---|---|---|---|
| Olympic Games | 1 | 0 | 0 |
| World Weightlifting Championships | 1 | 1 | 1 |
| Asian Games | 0 | 1 | 0 |
| Asian Weightlifting Championships | 0 | 1 | 0 |
| Total | 2 | 3 | 1 |
Olympic Games
| Gold medal – first place | 2016 Rio de Janeiro | –58 kg |
World Championships
| Disqualified | 2018 Ashgabat | –55 kg |
| Silver medal – second place | 2017 Anaheim | –58 kg |
| Bronze medal – third place | 2014 Almaty | –58 kg |
Asian Championships
| Silver medal – second place | 2015 Phuket | 58 kg |
Asian Games
| Silver medal – second place | 2018 Jakarta-Palembang | –58 kg |
Summer Universiade
| Silver medal – second place | 2017 Taipei | 58 kg |

Sukanya Srisurat (Thai: สุกัญญา ศรีสุราช; RTGS: Sukanya Sisurat; born 3 May 1995) is a Thai weightlifter competing in the 58 kg category and representing Thailand at international competitions. She competed at world championships, including at the 2015 World Weightlifting Championships.

She was sanctioned for using the doping Methandienone.

In January 2019 she was issued a four-year doping ban until January 2023 after testing positive for 5a- androstane-3a, 17 bdiol (5aAdiol) and 5b-androstane-3a, 17 b-diol (5bAdiol).

== Major results ==
| Year | Venue | Weight | Snatch (kg) | | | | Clean & Jerk (kg) | | | | Total | Rank |
| Year | Venue | Weight | 1 | 2 | 3 | Rank | 1 | 2 | 3 | Rank | Total | Rank |
Olympic Games
| 2016 | Rio de Janeiro, Brazil | 58 kg | 105 | 108 | 110 OR | 1 | 127 | 130 | ~~132~~ | 1 | 240 | 1st place, gold medalist(s) |
World Championships
| 2014 | Almaty, Kazakhstan | 58 kg | 102 | 105 | 106 | 1st place, gold medalist(s) | 120 | ~~125~~ | 125 | 4 | 231 | 3rd place, bronze medalist(s) |
| 2015 | Houston, United States | 58 kg | 103 | 106 | ~~109~~ | 3rd place, bronze medalist(s) | ~~121~~ | ~~121~~ | 121 | 7 | 227 | 4 |
| 2017 | Anaheim, United States | 58 kg | 99 | 102 | 105 | 1st place, gold medalist(s) | 117 | 120 | ~~124~~ | 6 | 225 | 2nd place, silver medalist(s) |
| 2018 | Ashgabat, Turkmenistan | 55 kg | 101 | 102 | 105 | — | 122 | 125 | 127 | — | — | DQ |
Asian Championships
| 2013 | Astana, Kazakhstan | 58 kg | 87 | 91 | 94 | 6 | ~~111~~ | 111 | ~~115~~ | 6 | 205 | 6 |
| 2015 | Phuket, Thailand | 58 kg | 101 | ~~104~~ | 104 | 1st place, gold medalist(s) | ~~121~~ | 121 | ~~125~~ | 3rd place, bronze medalist(s) | 225 | 2nd place, silver medalist(s) |
Summer Universiade
| 2017 | New Taipei, Chinese Taipei | 58kg | 95 | ~~100~~ | 100 | 2 | 118 | 121 | ~~123~~ | 3 | 221 | 2nd place, silver medalist(s) |
World Junior Championships
| 2015 | Wrocław, Poland | 58 kg | 100 | 103 | 105 | 1st place, gold medalist(s) | 120 | 125 | ~~128~~ | 2nd place, silver medalist(s) | 230 | 1st place, gold medalist(s) |
| 2014 | Kazan, Russia | 58 kg | 94 | 97 | 99 | 1st place, gold medalist(s) | 115 | 118 | 119 | 2nd place, silver medalist(s) | 218 | 1st place, gold medalist(s) |
World Youth Championships
| 2011 | Lima, Peru | 58 kg | 75 | ~~91~~ | ~~91~~ | -- | 100 | ~~111~~ | 111 | -- | -- | DSQ |

- CWR: Current world record
- WR: World record
