= Tali Darsigny =

Canadian weightlifter (born 1998)

Personal information
- Born: March 8, 1998 (age 28) Saint-Hyacinthe, Quebec, Canada
- Height: 1.65 m (5 ft 5 in)

Sport
- Country: Canada
- Sport: Weightlifting
- Events: Women's 58 kg and 59 kg
Medal record
Commonwealth Games
Silver medal – second place	2018 Gold Coast	58 kg
Bronze medal – third place	2022 Birmingham	59 kg

Tali Darsigny (born 8 March 1998) is a Canadian weightlifter.

She has represented Canada at the Commonwealth Games in 2018 and 2022, the Pan American Games in 2019 and the Summer Olympics in 2021.

== Career ==
Darsigny competed in the 2017 World Weightlifting Championships, coming in ninth in the Women's 58 kg event.

She competed in the 2018 Commonwealth Games where she won a silver medal in the Women's 58 kg event with a combined total of 200 kg. She also competed at the 2019 Pan American Games.

In June 2021, Darsigny was named to Canada's Olympic team. She finished in 9th place in the women's 59 kg event.

She won a bronze medal at the 2022 Commonwealth Games in the Women's 59 kg event.

== Personal life ==
She is the daughter of weightlifter Yvan Darsigny. She is also the sister of Shad Darsigny.
