= Sabine Kusterer =

German weightlifter (born 1991)

Personal information
- Full name: Sabine Beate Kusterer
- Born: 4 January 1991 (age 35) Leimen, Baden-Württemberg, Germany
- Height: 1.56 m (5 ft 1 in)
- Weight: 58 kg (128 lb)

Sport
- Country: Germany
- Sport: Weightlifting
- Event: Women's 58 kg
Medal record
European Junior Championships
Silver medal – second place	2010 Limassol	-58 kg snatch

Sabine Beate Kusterer (born 4 January 1991) is a German weightlifter. She competed in the women's 58 kg event at the 2016 Summer Olympics held in Rio de Janeiro, Brazil. She also competed in the women's 59 kg event at the 2020 Summer Olympics held in Tokyo, Japan.
