= Yusleidy Figueroa =

Venezuelan weightlifter (born 1993)

Personal information
- Born: 9 January 1993 (age 33) Caracas, Venezuela
- Height: 1.53 m (5 ft 0 in)
- Weight: 58 kg (128 lb)

Sport
- Country: Venezuela
- Sport: Weightlifting
- Event: Women's 58 kg
Medal record
Representing Venezuela
Women's weightlifting
Pan American Games
Silver medal – second place	2015 Toronto	–58 kg
Bronze medal – third place	2019 Lima	–59 kg

Yusleidy Mariana Figueroa Roldán (born 9 January 1993) is a Venezuelan weightlifter. She competed in the women's 58 kg event at the 2016 Summer Olympics. She also represented Venezuela at the 2020 Summer Olympics in Tokyo, Japan. She finished in 6th place in the women's 59 kg event.
