= Mikiko Ando =

Japanese weightlifter (born 1992)

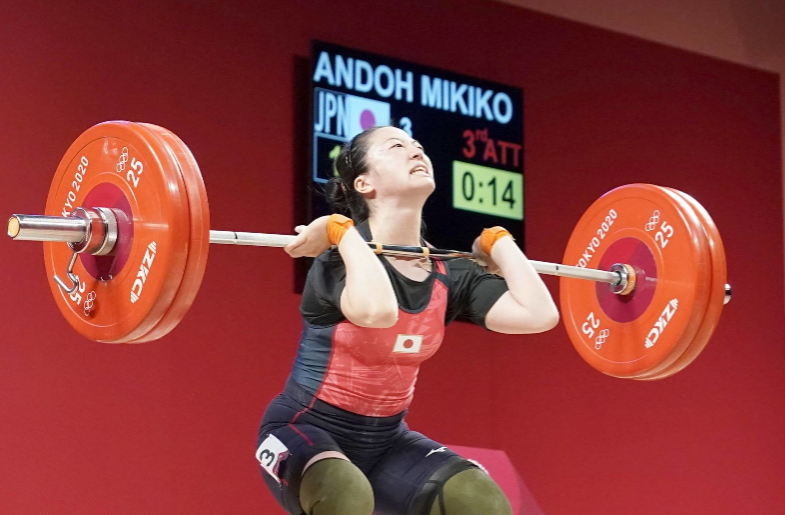
- Ando in 2022

Personal information
- Born: 30 September 1992 (age 33) Shiroi, Japan
- Height: 1.55 m (5 ft 1 in)
- Weight: 58.40 kg (128.7 lb)

Sport
- Country: Japan
- Sport: Weightlifting
- Team: National team
Medal record
Representing Japan
Olympic Games
Bronze medal – third place	2020 Tokyo	–59 kg
Asian Games
Bronze medal – third place	2018 Jakarta-Palembang	–58 kg

Mikiko Ando (安藤 美希子, Andō Mikiko; born 30 September 1992) is a Japanese weightlifter. She competed at the 2016 Summer Olympics, and 2020 Summer Olympics, in Women's 59 kg, winning a bronze medal.

== Career ==
She has competed at six world championships.

Most recently, she competed at the 2018 World Weightlifting Championships, winning a bronze medal in the Clean and Jerk portion of the competition.

She competed in the 58 kg category until 2018 and 59 kg starting in 2018 after the International Weightlifting Federation reorganized the categories.

She injured her knee three weeks before the 2020 Olympics, but rehabilitated to compete.

== Major results ==
Year	Venue	Weight	Snatch (kg)				Clean & Jerk (kg)				Total	Rank
Year	Venue	Weight	1	2	3	Rank	1	2	3	Rank	Total	Rank
Olympic Games
2016	Rio de Janeiro, Brazil	58 kg	90	~~93~~	94	8	120	124	~~126~~	4	218	5
2021	Tokyo, Japan	59 kg	92	94	~~96~~	6	116	~~120~~	120	3	214	3rd place, bronze medalist(s)
World Championships
2011	Paris, France	58 kg	82	85	~~87~~	23	112	115	117	11	202	14
2013	Wrocław, Poland	58 kg	86	90	~~92~~	10	113	117	~~121~~	6	207	7
2014	Almaty, Kazakhstan	58 kg	87	89	~~91~~	16	116	~~119~~	119	6	208	8
2015	Houston, United States	58 kg	90	93	~~95~~	11	120	~~123~~	~~123~~	10	213	8
2017	Anaheim, United States	58 kg	~~93~~	93	~~95~~	7	123	126	~~130~~	2nd place, silver medalist(s)	219	4
2018	Ashgabat, Turkmenistan	59 kg	93	~~97~~	~~97~~	11	124	127	131	3rd place, bronze medalist(s)	224	5
