= Izabella Yaylyan =

Armenian weightlifter (born 1995)

Personal information
- Born: 4 January 1995 (age 31)

Sport
- Country: Armenia
- Sport: Weightlifting
- Weight class: 55 kg; 59 kg
Medal record
Women's weightlifting
Representing Armenia
European Championships
Bronze medal – third place	2023 Yerevan	55 kg

Izabella Yaylyan (Իզաբելլա Յայլյան) is a female weightlifter born on 4 January 1995 in Yerevan, Armenia. In 2021, she represented Armenia at the 2020 Summer Olympics in Tokyo, Japan. She finished in 7th place in the women's 59 kg event. She won the bronze medal in the women's 55 kg event at the 2023 European Weightlifting Championships held in Yerevan, Armenia.

Yaylyan won the gold medal in her event at both the 2014 European Junior & U23 Weightlifting Championships held in Limassol, Cyprus and the 2015 European Junior & U23 Weightlifting Championships held in Klaipeda, Lithuania. In 2017, she won the bronze medal in the women's under-23 58 kg event at the 2017 European Junior & U23 Weightlifting Championships held in Durrës, Albania.

At the 2021 European Weightlifting Championships in Moscow, Russia, she won the silver medal in the women's 55 kg Snatch event.
