= Boyanka Kostova =

Bulgarian-born Azerbaijani weightlifter

Personal information
- Born: May 10, 1993 (age 33) Plovdiv, Bulgaria
- Height: 1.50 m (4 ft 11 in)
- Weight: 58 kg (128 lb)
Medal record
Women's Weightlifting
Representing Azerbaijan
World Championships
Gold medal – first place	2015 Houston^{Δ}	–58 kg
European Championships
Gold medal – first place	2012 Antalya	–58 kg
Gold medal – first place	2015 Tbilisi^{Δ}	–58 kg
Gold medal – first place	2016 Førde^{Δ}	–58 kg
Disqualified	2021 Moscow	-59 kg
Representing Bulgaria
European Championships
Silver medal – second place	2010 Minsk	–53 kg
Youth Olympic Games
Gold medal – first place	2010 Singapore	–53 kg

Boyanka Kostova (Bulgarian: Боянка Костова, born 10 May 1993) is a Bulgarian-born naturalized Azerbaijani weightlifter. She competed at the 2012 Summer Olympics in the women's 58 kg, finishing in fifth place.

== Career ==
In June 2016, following the Russian doping scandal, it was announced by IWF that retests of the samples taken from the 2012 Olympics indicated that Kostova had tested positive for prohibited substances, namely Dehydrochloromethyltestosterone and Stanozolol, meaning she lost all results and medals earned from the date of the sample in 2012 to 2016. In November 2016 the IOC Disciplinary Commission disqualified Kostova from the 2012 Olympic Games.

In May 2021, shortly after the European Championships in which she took gold, Kostova tested positive for the banned substance Stanozolol again. In October 2021, she was banned for eight years as it was her second doping violation.

In the beginning of 2022 she was arrested for drug traffic in Bulgaria. She was sentenced to 3 years of prison, but her sentence was shorten until November 2022 in order to start a coaching career and study to NSA under Lachezar Kishkilov, who was her coach, surveillance.

== In pop culture ==
A trap musical band from Galicia, Spain, took its name from the athlete.
