= List of World Championships medalists in weightlifting (women) =

This is a List of World Championships medalists in women's weightlifting.

== Flyweight ==
- 44 kg: 1987–1992
- 46 kg: 1993–1997
- 45 kg: 2018–2024

Games	Gold	Silver	Bronze
1987 Daytona Beach	Cai Jun (CHN)	Chen Aizhen (CHN)	Sibby Harris (USA)
1988 Jakarta	Xing Fen (CHN)	Choi Myung-shik (KOR)	Ponco Imbarwati (INA)
1989 Manchester	Xing Fen (CHN)	Kunjarani Devi (IND)	Bastiyah Said Muhamad (INA)
1990 Sarajevo	Wu Xiangmei (CHN)	Satomi Saito (JPN)	Bastiyah Said Muhamad (INA)
1991 Donaueschingen	Xing Fen (CHN)	Kunjarani Devi (IND)	Sibby Flowers (USA)
1992 Varna	Guan Hong (CHN)	Kunjarani Devi (IND)	Sibby Flowers (USA)
1993 Melbourne	Chu Nan-mei (TPE)	Yu Shiu-fen (TPE)	Satomi Saito (JPN)
1994 Istanbul	Yun Yanhong (CHN)	Kunjarani Devi (IND)	Tsai Huey-woan (TPE)
1995 Guangzhou	Guan Hong (CHN)	Kunjarani Devi (IND)	Tsai Huey-woan (TPE)
1996 Warsaw	Guan Hong (CHN)	Kunjarani Devi (IND)	Tsai Huey-woan (TPE)
1997 Chiang Mai	Liu Ling (CHN)	Kunjarani Devi (IND)	Sri Indriyani (INA)
2018 Ashgabat	Ýulduz Jumabaýewa (TKM)	Chiraphan Nanthawong (THA)	Katherin Echandía (VEN)
2019 Pattaya	Şaziye Erdoğan (TUR)	Ludia Montero (CUB)	Lisa Setiawati (INA)
2021 Tashkent	Thanyathon Sukcharoen (THA)	Manuela Berrío (COL)	Şaziye Erdoğan (TUR)
2022 Bogotá	Thanyathon Sukcharoen (THA)	Chayuttra Pramongkhol (THA)	Manuela Berrío (COL)
2023 Riyadh	Sirivimon Pramongkhol (THA)	Rosina Randafiarison (MAD)	Cansu Bektaş (TUR)
2024 Manama	Zhao Jinhong (CHN)	Won Hyon-sim (PRK)	Phạm Đình Thi (VIE)

== Bantamweight ==
- 48 kg: 1987–1992
- 50 kg: 1993–1997
- 48 kg: 1998–2017
- 49 kg: 2018–2024
- 48 kg: 2025
- 49 kg: 2026–

Games	Gold	Silver	Bronze
1987 Daytona Beach	Huang Xiaoyu (CHN)	Robin Byrd (USA)	Sandra Gómez (ESP)
1988 Jakarta	Huang Xiaoyu (CHN)	Robin Byrd (USA)	Siti Aisah (INA)
1989 Manchester	Huang Xiaoyu (CHN)	Choi Myung-shik (KOR)	Chu Nan-mei (TPE)
1990 Sarajevo	Cai Jun (CHN)	Choi Myung-shik (KOR)	Ri Yong-hwa (PRK)
1991 Donaueschingen	Izabela Rifatova (BUL)	Liao Shuping (CHN)	Donka Mincheva (BUL)
1992 Varna	Liu Xiuhua (CHN)	Izabela Rifatova (BUL)	Donka Mincheva (BUL)
1993 Melbourne	Liu Xiuhua (CHN)	Guan Hong (CHN)	Kuo Chin-chun (TPE)
1994 Istanbul	Robin Byrd (USA)	Izabela Rifatova (BUL)	Chen Li-chuan (TPE)
1995 Guangzhou	Liu Xiuhua (CHN)	Chu Nan-mei (TPE)	Izabela Rifatova (BUL)
1996 Warsaw	Liu Xiuhua (CHN)	Choi Myung-shik (KOR)	Chu Nan-mei (TPE)
1997 Chiang Mai	Winarni Binti Slamet (INA)	Izabela Dragneva (BUL)	Ri Yong-hwa (PRK)
1998 Lahti	Li Yunli (CHN)	Chu Nan-mei (TPE)	Tsai Huey-woan (TPE)
1999 Athens	Donka Mincheva (BUL)	Sri Indriyani (INA)	Kaori Niyanagi (JPN)
2001 Antalya	Gao Wei (CHN)	Blessed Udoh (NGR)	Chen Han-tung (TPE)
2002 Warsaw	Wang Mingjuan (CHN)	Nurcan Taylan (TUR)	Izabela Dragneva (BUL)
2003 Vancouver	Wang Mingjuan (CHN)	Aree Wiratthaworn (THA)	Nurcan Taylan (TUR)
2005 Doha	Wang Mingjuan (CHN)	Pensiri Saelaw (THA)	Aree Wiratthaworn (THA)
2006 Santo Domingo	Yang Lian (CHN)	Aree Wiratthaworn (THA)	Hiromi Miyake (JPN)
2007 Chiang Mai	Chen Xiexia (CHN)	Pramsiri Bunphithak (THA)	Pensiri Laosirikul (THA)
2009 Goyang	Wang Mingjuan (CHN)	Sibel Özkan (TUR)	Chen Wei-ling (TPE)
2010 Antalya	Sibel Özkan (TUR)	Tian Yuan (CHN)	Pramsiri Bunphithak (THA)
2011 Paris	Tian Yuan (CHN)	Panida Khamsri (THA)	Nurdan Karagöz (TUR)
2013 Wrocław	Tan Yayun (CHN)	Ryang Chun-hwa (PRK)	Đỗ Thị Thu Hoài (VIE)
2014 Almaty	Tan Yayun (CHN)	Sibel Özkan (TUR)	Panida Khamsri (THA)
2015 Houston	Jiang Huihua (CHN)	Vương Thị Huyền (VIE)	Hiromi Miyake (JPN)
2017 Anaheim	Mirabai Chanu (IND)	Thunya Sukcharoen (THA)	Ana Segura (COL)
2018 Ashgabat	Hou Zhihui (CHN)	Jiang Huihua (CHN)	Elena Andrieș (ROU)
2019 Pattaya	Jiang Huihua (CHN)	Hou Zhihui (CHN)	Ri Song-gum (PRK)
2021 Tashkent	Surodchana Khambao (THA)	Rira Suzuki (JPN)	Ibuki Takahashi (JPN)
2022 Bogotá	Jiang Huihua (CHN)	Mirabai Chanu (IND)	Hou Zhihui (CHN)
2023 Riyadh	Jiang Huihua (CHN)	Hou Zhihui (CHN)	Jourdan Delacruz (USA)
2024 Manama	Ri Song-gum (PRK)	Xiang Linxiang (CHN)	Rosegie Ramos (PHI)
2025 Førde	Ri Song-gum (PRK)	Mirabai Chanu (IND)	Thanyathon Sukcharoen (THA)
2026 Ningbo	Ri Song-gum (PRK)	Zhao Jinhong (CHN)	Huang Yi-chen (TPE)

== Featherweight ==
- 52 kg: 1987–1992
- 54 kg: 1993–1997
- 53 kg: 1998–2017
- 55 kg: 2018–2024
- 53 kg: 2025–

Games	Gold	Silver	Bronze
1987 Daytona Beach	Yan Zhangqun (CHN)	Margarita Babadzanova (BUL)	Rachel Silverman (USA)
1988 Jakarta	Peng Liping (CHN)	Sandra Gómez (ESP)	Kim Oh-sook (KOR)
1989 Manchester	Peng Liping (CHN)	Hiromi Uemura (JPN)	Siyka Stoeva (BUL)
1990 Sarajevo	Liao Shuping (CHN)	Hiromi Uemura (JPN)	Pauline Haughton (GBR)
1991 Donaueschingen	Peng Liping (CHN)	Robin Byrd (USA)	Hiromi Uemura (JPN)
1992 Varna	Peng Liping (CHN)	Siyka Stoeva (BUL)	Robin Byrd (USA)
1993 Melbourne	Chen Xiaomin (CHN)	Robin Byrd (USA)	Karnam Malleswari (IND)
1994 Istanbul	Karnam Malleswari (IND)	Li Fengying (CHN)	Janeta Georgieva (BUL)
1995 Guangzhou	Karnam Malleswari (IND)	Zhang Xixiang (CHN)	Kuo Ping-chun (TPE)
1996 Warsaw	Zhang Xixiang (CHN)	Kuo Ping-chun (TPE)	Karnam Malleswari (IND)
1997 Chiang Mai	Meng Xianjuan (CHN)	Ri Song-hui (PRK)	Saipin Detsaeng (THA)
1998 Lahti	Wang Xiufen (CHN)	Izabela Dragneva (BUL)	Robin Goad (USA)
1999 Athens	Li Feng-ying (TPE)	Winarni Binti Slamet (INA)	Wang Xiufen (CHN)
2001 Antalya	Li Feng-ying (TPE)	Qiu Hongxia (CHN)	Alexandra Escobar (ECU)
2002 Warsaw	Ri Song-hui (PRK)	Li Xuejiu (CHN)	Udomporn Polsak (THA)
2003 Vancouver	Udomporn Polsak (THA)	Ri Song-hui (PRK)	Junpim Kuntatean (THA)
2005 Doha	Li Ping (CHN)	Junpim Kuntatean (THA)	Yuderqui Contreras (DOM)
2006 Santo Domingo	Qiu Hongxia (CHN)	Raema Lisa Rumbewas (INA)	Suda Chaleephay (THA)
2007 Chiang Mai	Li Ping (CHN)	Nastassia Novikava (BLR)	Yoon Jin-hee (KOR)
2009 Goyang	Zulfiya Chinshanlo (KAZ)	Chen Xiaoting (CHN)	Yoon Jin-hee (KOR)
2010 Antalya	Chen Xiaoting (CHN)	Aylin Daşdelen (TUR)	Yuderqui Contreras (DOM)
2011 Paris	Zulfiya Chinshanlo (KAZ)	Aylin Daşdelen (TUR)	Ji Jing (CHN)
2013 Wrocław	Li Yajun (CHN)	Sopita Tanasan (THA)	Kittima Sutanan (THA)
2014 Almaty	Zulfiya Chinshanlo (KAZ)	Hsu Shu-ching (TPE)	Li Yajun (CHN)
2015 Houston	Hsu Shu-ching (TPE)	Chen Xiaoting (CHN)	Hidilyn Diaz (PHI)
2017 Anaheim	Sopita Tanasan (THA)	Kristina Şermetowa (TKM)	Hidilyn Diaz (PHI)
2018 Ashgabat	Li Yajun (CHN)	Zhang Wanqiong (CHN)	Zulfiya Chinshanlo (KAZ)
2019 Pattaya	Liao Qiuyun (CHN)	Zhang Wanqiong (CHN)	Hidilyn Diaz (PHI)
2021 Tashkent	Ghofrane Belkhir (TUN)	Adijat Olarinoye (NGR)	Svitlana Samuliak (UKR)
2022 Bogotá	Hidilyn Diaz (PHI)	Rosalba Morales (COL)	Ana Gabriela López (MEX)
2023 Riyadh	Chen Guan-ling (TPE)	Rohelys Galvis (COL)	Irene Borrego (MEX)
2024 Manama	Kang Hyon-gyong (PRK)	Chen Guan-ling (TPE)	Aleksandra Grigoryan (ARM)
2025 Førde	Kang Hyon-gyong (PRK)	Mihaela Cambei (ROU)	Surodchana Khambao (THA)
2026 Ningbo	Zhang Haiqin (CHN)	Miranda Ulrey (USA)	Kim So-hyon (PRK)

== Lightweight ==
- 56 kg: 1987–1992
- 59 kg: 1993–1997
- 58 kg: 1998–2017
- 59 kg: 2018–2024
- 58 kg: 2025
- 57 kg: 2026–

Games	Gold	Silver	Bronze
1987 Daytona Beach	Cui Aihong (CHN)	Won Soon-yi (KOR)	Stéphanie Genna (FRA)
1988 Jakarta	Ma Na (CHN)	Won Soon-yi (KOR)	Yang Mei-tzu (TPE)
1989 Manchester	Xing Liwei (CHN)	Janeta Georgieva (BUL)	Lalita Polley (IND)
1990 Sarajevo	Wu Haiqing (CHN)	Ni Chia-ping (TPE)	Janeta Georgieva (BUL)
1991 Donaueschingen	Sun Caiyan (CHN)	Neli Yankova (BUL)	Nancy Niro (CAN)
1992 Varna	Sun Caiyan (CHN)	Neli Yankova (BUL)	Ni Chia-ping (TPE)
1993 Melbourne	Sun Caiyan (CHN)	Gergana Kirilova (BUL)	Maria Christoforidou (GRE)
1994 Istanbul	Zou Feie (CHN)	Gergana Kirilova (BUL)	Khassaraporn Suta (THA)
1995 Guangzhou	Chen Xiaomin (CHN)	Neelam Setti Laxmi (IND)	Wu Mei-yi (TPE)
1996 Warsaw	Chen Xiaomin (CHN)	Maria Christoforidou (GRE)	Yuriko Takahashi (JPN)
1997 Chiang Mai	Patmawati Abdul Hamid (INA)	Khassaraporn Suta (THA)	Naw Ju Ni (MYA)
1998 Lahti	Kuo Ping-chun (TPE)	Song Zhijuan (CHN)	Neli Yankova (BUL)
1999 Athens	Chen Yanqing (CHN)	Ri Song-hui (PRK)	Kuo Ping-chun (TPE)
2001 Antalya	Aleksandra Klejnowska (POL)	Liu Bing (CHN)	Marieta Gotfryd (POL)
2002 Warsaw	Song Zhijuan (CHN)	Wandee Kameaim (THA)	Charikleia Kastritsi (GRE)
2003 Vancouver	Sun Caiyan (CHN)	Patmawati Abdul Hamid (INA)	Aylin Daşdelen (TUR)
2005 Doha	Gu Wei (CHN)	Wandee Kameaim (THA)	Marina Shainova (RUS)
2006 Santo Domingo	Qiu Hongmei (CHN)	Svetlana Tsarukaeva (RUS)	Wandee Kameaim (THA)
2007 Chiang Mai	Qiu Hongmei (CHN)	Marina Shainova (RUS)	O Jong-ae (PRK)
2009 Goyang	Li Xueying (CHN)	Nastassia Novikava (BLR)	Yuliya Kalina (UKR)
2010 Antalya	Deng Wei (CHN)	Nastassia Novikava (BLR)	Jong Chun-mi (PRK)
2011 Paris	Nastassia Novikava (BLR)	Li Xueying (CHN)	Pimsiri Sirikaew (THA)
2013 Wrocław	Kuo Hsing-chun (TPE)	Alexandra Escobar (ECU)	Elena Shadrina (RUS)
2014 Almaty	Deng Mengrong (CHN)	Sukanya Srisurat (THA)	Rattikan Gulnoi (THA)
2015 Houston	Boyanka Kostova (AZE)	Deng Mengrong (CHN)	Kuo Hsing-chun (TPE)
2017 Anaheim	Kuo Hsing-chun (TPE)	Sukanya Srisurat (THA)	Rebeka Koha (LAT)
2018 Ashgabat	Kuo Hsing-chun (TPE)	Chen Guiming (CHN)	Rebeka Koha (LAT)
2019 Pattaya	Kuo Hsing-chun (TPE)	Choe Hyo-sim (PRK)	Chen Guiming (CHN)
2021 Tashkent	Kuo Hsing-chun (TPE)	Yenny Álvarez (COL)	Olga Te (RWF)
2022 Bogotá	Yenny Álvarez (COL)	Kuo Hsing-chun (TPE)	Maude Charron (CAN)
2023 Riyadh	Luo Shifang (CHN)	Kamila Konotop (UKR)	Pei Xinyi (CHN)
2024 Manama	Kim Il-gyong (PRK)	Pei Xinyi (CHN)	Yenny Álvarez (COL)
2025 Førde	Kim Il-gyong (PRK)	Rafiatu Lawal (NGR)	Kuo Hsing-chun (TPE)
2026 Ningbo	Oh Kwang-ok (PRK)	Chen Guan-ling (TPE)	Olha Ivzhenko (UKR)

== Middleweight ==
- 60 kg: 1987–1992
- 64 kg: 1993–1997
- 63 kg: 1998–2017
- 64 kg: 2018–2024
- 63 kg: 2025
- 61 kg: 2026–

Games	Gold	Silver	Bronze
1987 Daytona Beach	Zeng Xinling (CHN)	Ibolya Torma (HUN)	Gabriela Dimitrova (BUL)
1988 Jakarta	Yang Jing (CHN)	Maria Christoforidou (GRE)	Colleene Colley (USA)
1989 Manchester	Ma Na (CHN)	Camelia Nikolaeva (BUL)	Daniela Kerkelova (BUL)
1990 Sarajevo	Maria Christoforidou (GRE)	Ji Qinghua (CHN)	Daniela Kerkelova (BUL)
1991 Donaueschingen	Han Lixia (CHN)	Won Soon-yi (KOR)	Daniela Kerkelova (BUL)
1992 Varna	Li Hongyun (CHN)	Maria Christoforidou (GRE)	Won Soon-yi (KOR)
1993 Melbourne	Li Hongyun (CHN)	Won Soon-yi (KOR)	Julie Malenfant (CAN)
1994 Istanbul	Li Hongyun (CHN)	Kuo Shu-fen (TPE)	Erzsébet Márkus (HUN)
1995 Guangzhou	Chen Jui-lien (TPE)	Gergana Kirilova (BUL)	Maria Christoforidou (GRE)
1996 Warsaw	Li Hongyun (CHN)	Chen Jui-lien (TPE)	Huang Hsi-li (TPE)
1997 Chiang Mai	Chen Yanqing (CHN)	Chen Jui-lien (TPE)	Neelam Setti Laxmi (IND)
1998 Lahti	Chen Jui-lien (TPE)	Shi Lihua (CHN)	Valentina Popova (RUS)
1999 Athens	Chen Jui-lien (TPE)	Xiong Meiying (CHN)	Valentina Popova (RUS)
2001 Antalya	Xiao Ying (CHN)	Anastasia Tsakiri (GRE)	Kuo Ping-chun (TPE)
2002 Warsaw	Liu Xia (CHN)	Anastasia Tsakiri (GRE)	Gergana Kirilova (BUL)
2003 Vancouver	Nataliya Skakun (UKR)	Liu Xia (CHN)	Hanna Batsiushka (BLR)
2005 Doha	Pawina Thongsuk (THA)	Svetlana Shimkova (RUS)	Liu Xia (CHN)
2006 Santo Domingo	Ouyang Xiaofang (CHN)	Svetlana Shimkova (RUS)	Meline Daluzyan (ARM)
2007 Chiang Mai	Liu Haixia (CHN)	Svetlana Tsarukaeva (RUS)	Pak Hyon-suk (PRK)
2009 Goyang	Maiya Maneza (KAZ)	Svetlana Tsarukaeva (RUS)	Sibel Şimşek (TUR)
2010 Antalya	Maiya Maneza (KAZ)	Sibel Şimşek (TUR)	Ouyang Xiaofang (CHN)
2011 Paris	Svetlana Tsarukaeva (RUS)	Maiya Maneza (KAZ)	Ouyang Xiaofang (CHN)
2013 Wrocław	Tima Turieva (RUS)	Jo Pok-hyang (PRK)	Deng Mengrong (CHN)
2014 Almaty	Deng Wei (CHN)	Tima Turieva (RUS)	Choe Hyo-sim (PRK)
2015 Houston	Deng Wei (CHN)	Tima Turieva (RUS)	Choe Hyo-sim (PRK)
2017 Anaheim	Loredana Toma (ROU)	Lina Rivas (COL)	Mercedes Pérez (COL)
2018 Ashgabat	Deng Wei (CHN)	Rim Un-sim (PRK)	Loredana Toma (ROU)
2019 Pattaya	Deng Wei (CHN)	Rim Un-sim (PRK)	Loredana Toma (ROU)
2021 Tashkent	Neama Said (EGY)	Chen Wen-huei (TPE)	Park Min-kyung (KOR)
2022 Bogotá	Pei Xinyi (CHN)	Rattanawan Wamalun (THA)	Natalia Llamosa (COL)
2023 Riyadh	Natalia Llamosa (COL)	Ruth Ayodele (NGR)	Park Min-kyung (KOR)
2024 Manama	Ri Suk (PRK)	Rim Un-sim (PRK)	Li Shuang (CHN)
2025 Førde	Ri Suk (PRK)	Maude Charron (CAN)	Yenny Sinisterra (COL)
2026 Ningbo	Pei Xinyi (CHN)	Yang Liuyue (CHN)	Pak Jin-hae (PRK)

== Light heavyweight ==
- 67.5 kg: 1987–1992
- 70 kg: 1993–1997
- 69 kg: 1998–2017
- 71 kg: 2018–2024
- 69 kg: 2025–

Games	Gold	Silver	Bronze
1987 Daytona Beach	Gao Lijuan (CHN)	Arlys Kovach (USA)	Senka Asenova (BUL)
1988 Jakarta	Guo Qiuxiang (CHN)	Mária Takács (HUN)	Jeanette Rose (GBR)
1989 Manchester	Guo Qiuxiang (CHN)	Mária Takács (HUN)	Valkana Tosheva (BUL)
1990 Sarajevo	Wang Genying (CHN)	Camelia Nikolaeva (BUL)	Mária Takács (HUN)
1991 Donaueschingen	Lei Li (CHN)	Kumi Haseba (JPN)	Kim Dong-hee (KOR)
1992 Varna	Gao Lijuan (CHN)	Milena Trendafilova (BUL)	María Dolores Martínez (ESP)
1993 Melbourne	Milena Trendafilova (BUL)	Kumi Haseba (JPN)	Kim Dong-hee (KOR)
1994 Istanbul	Zhou Meihong (CHN)	Qu Lihua (CHN)	Wasana Putcharkarn (THA)
1995 Guangzhou	Tang Weifang (CHN)	Li Hongyun (CHN)	Milena Trendafilova (BUL)
1996 Warsaw	Tang Weifang (CHN)	Irina Kasimova (RUS)	Kim Dong-hee (KOR)
1997 Chiang Mai	Xiang Fenglan (CHN)	Huang Hsi-li (TPE)	Ilona Dankó (HUN)
1998 Lahti	Tang Weifang (CHN)	Wu Mei-yi (TPE)	Irina Kasimova (RUS)
1999 Athens	Sun Tianni (CHN)	Milena Trendafilova (BUL)	Erzsébet Márkus (HUN)
2001 Antalya	Valentina Popova (RUS)	Svetlana Khabirova (RUS)	Eszter Krutzler (HUN)
2002 Warsaw	Pawina Thongsuk (THA)	Valentina Popova (RUS)	Nahla Ramadan (EGY)
2003 Vancouver	Liu Chunhong (CHN)	Eszter Krutzler (HUN)	Valentina Popova (RUS)
2005 Doha	Zarema Kasaeva (RUS)	Liu Haixia (CHN)	Olga Kiseleva (RUS)
2006 Santo Domingo	Oxana Slivenko (RUS)	Tatiana Matveeva (RUS)	Jeane Lassen (CAN)
2007 Chiang Mai	Oxana Slivenko (RUS)	Liu Chunhong (CHN)	Nataliya Davydova (UKR)
2009 Goyang	Nazik Avdalyan (ARM)	Oxana Slivenko (RUS)	Zhang Shaoling (MAC)
2010 Antalya	Svetlana Shimkova (RUS)	Kang Yue (CHN)	Meline Daluzyan (ARM)
2011 Paris	Oxana Slivenko (RUS)	Xiang Yanmei (CHN)	Tatiana Matveeva (RUS)
2013 Wrocław	Xiang Yanmei (CHN)	Ryo Un-hui (PRK)	Dzina Sazanavets (BLR)
2014 Almaty	Ryo Un-hui (PRK)	Zhazira Zhapparkul (KAZ)	Xiang Yanmei (CHN)
2015 Houston	Xiang Yanmei (CHN)	Zhazira Zhapparkul (KAZ)	Anastasia Romanova (RUS)
2017 Anaheim	Leydi Solís (COL)	Mattie Rogers (USA)	Miyareth Mendoza (COL)
2018 Ashgabat	Zhang Wangli (CHN)	Sara Ahmed (EGY)	Nadezda Likhacheva (KAZ)
2019 Pattaya	Katherine Nye (USA)	Mattie Rogers (USA)	Kim Hyo-sim (PRK)
2021 Tashkent	Meredith Alwine (USA)	Sarah Davies (GBR)	Patricia Strenius (SWE)
2022 Bogotá	Loredana Toma (ROU)	Zeng Tiantian (CHN)	Angie Palacios (ECU)
2023 Riyadh	Liao Guifang (CHN)	Angie Palacios (ECU)	Olivia Reeves (USA)
2024 Manama	Olivia Reeves (USA)	Jong Chun-hui (PRK)	Yang Qiuxia (CHN)
2025 Førde	Song Kuk-hyang (PRK)	Julieth Rodríguez (COL)	Ingrid Segura (BRN)
2026 Ningbo	Song Kuk-hyang (PRK)	Ri Suk (PRK)	Julieth Rodríguez (COL)

== Middle heavyweight ==
- 75 kg: 1987–1992
- 76 kg: 1993–1997
- 75 kg: 1998–2017
- 76 kg: 2018–2024
- 77 kg: 2025–

Games	Gold	Silver	Bronze
1987 Daytona Beach	Li Hongling (CHN)	Mária Takács (HUN)	Tanya Dimitrova (BUL)
1988 Jakarta	Li Hongling (CHN)	Milena Trendafilova (BUL)	Arlys Kovach (USA)
1989 Manchester	Milena Trendafilova (BUL)	Zhang Xiaoli (CHN)	Arlys Kovach (USA)
1990 Sarajevo	Milena Trendafilova (BUL)	Li Changping (CHN)	Chen Shu-chih (TPE)
1991 Donaueschingen	Zhang Xiaoli (CHN)	Milena Trendafilova (BUL)	Mária Takács (HUN)
1992 Varna	Hua Ju (CHN)	Kumi Haseba (JPN)	Mária Takács (HUN)
1993 Melbourne	Hua Ju (CHN)	Li Changping (CHN)	Mária Takács (HUN)
1994 Istanbul	Panagiota Antonopoulou (GRE)	Mária Takács (HUN)	Albina Khomich (RUS)
1995 Guangzhou	Li Yan (CHN)	Zhang Xiaoli (CHN)	Mária Takács (HUN)
1996 Warsaw	Li Yan (CHN)	Mária Takács (HUN)	Panagiota Antonopoulou (GRE)
1997 Chiang Mai	Hua Ju (CHN)	Mária Takács (HUN)	Kim Soon-hee (KOR)
1998 Lahti	Karoliina Lundahl (FIN)	Şule Şahbaz (TUR)	Mária Takács (HUN)
1999 Athens	Xu Jiao (CHN)	Kim Soon-hee (KOR)	Ruth Ogbeifo (NGR)
2001 Antalya	Gyöngyi Likerecz (HUN)	Şule Şahbaz (TUR)	Cao Chunyan (CHN)
2002 Warsaw	Svetlana Khabirova (RUS)	Sun Ruiping (CHN)	Christina Ioannidi (GRE)
2003 Vancouver	Nahla Ramadan (EGY)	Slaveyka Ruzhinska (BUL)	Şule Şahbaz (TUR)
2005 Doha	Liu Chunhong (CHN)	Natalya Zabolotnaya (RUS)	Svetlana Podobedova (RUS)
2006 Santo Domingo	Cao Lei (CHN)	Nadezhda Evstyukhina (RUS)	Zarema Kasaeva (RUS)
2007 Chiang Mai	Cao Lei (CHN)	Natalya Zabolotnaya (RUS)	Nadezhda Evstyukhina (RUS)
2009 Goyang	Svetlana Podobedova (KAZ)	Cao Lei (CHN)	Abeer Abdelrahman (EGY)
2010 Antalya	Svetlana Podobedova (KAZ)	Natalya Zabolotnaya (RUS)	Nadezhda Evstyukhina (RUS)
2011 Paris	Nadezhda Evstyukhina (RUS)	Svetlana Podobedova (KAZ)	Kim Un-ju (PRK)
2013 Wrocław	Nadezhda Evstyukhina (RUS)	Kang Yue (CHN)	Lydia Valentín (ESP)
2014 Almaty	Nadezhda Evstyukhina (RUS)	Kang Yue (CHN)	Rim Jong-sim (PRK)
2015 Houston	Kang Yue (CHN)	Rim Jong-sim (PRK)	Svetlana Podobedova (KAZ)
2017 Anaheim	Lydia Valentín (ESP)	Neisi Dájomes (ECU)	Gaëlle Nayo-Ketchanke (FRA)
2018 Ashgabat	Wang Zhouyu (CHN)	Rim Jong-sim (PRK)	Neisi Dájomes (ECU)
2019 Pattaya	Rim Jong-sim (PRK)	Zhang Wangli (CHN)	Neisi Dájomes (ECU)
2021 Tashkent	Lee Min-ji (KOR)	Mattie Rogers (USA)	Iana Sotieva (RWF)
2022 Bogotá	Sara Ahmed (EGY)	Mattie Rogers (USA)	Kim Su-hyeon (KOR)
2023 Riyadh	Sara Ahmed (EGY)	Hellen Escobar (COL)	Bella Paredes (ECU)
2024 Manama	Song Kuk-hyang (PRK)	Miyareth Mendoza (COL)	Sarah Matthew (NGR)
2025 Førde	Olivia Reeves (USA)	Sara Ahmed (EGY)	Mari Sánchez (COL)
2026 Ningbo	Yang Qiuxia (CHN)	Peng Cuiting (CHN)	Sara Ahmed (EGY)

== First heavyweight ==
- 81 kg: 2018–2024

Games	Gold	Silver	Bronze
2018 Ashgabat	Lydia Valentín (ESP)	Darya Naumava (BLR)	Tamara Salazar (ECU)
2019 Pattaya	Leydi Solís (COL)	Lydia Valentín (ESP)	Jenny Arthur (USA)
2021 Tashkent	Alina Marushchak (UKR)	Valeria Rivas (COL)	Kim I-seul (KOR)
2022 Bogotá	Liang Xiaomei (CHN)	Wang Zhouyu (CHN)	Tamara Salazar (ECU)
2023 Riyadh	Liang Xiaomei (CHN)	Wang Zhouyu (CHN)	Eileen Cikamatana (AUS)
2024 Manama	Liao Guifang (CHN)	Sara Ahmed (EGY)	Kim Kyong-ryong (PRK)

== Heavyweight ==
- 82.5 kg: 1987–1992
- 83 kg: 1993–1997
- 90 kg: 2017
- 87 kg: 2018–2024
- 86 kg: 2025–

Games	Gold	Silver	Bronze
1987 Daytona Beach	Karyn Marshall (USA)	Erika Takács (HUN)	Milena Mileskova (BUL)
1988 Jakarta	Li Yanxia (CHN)	Erika Takács (HUN)	Milena Mileskova (BUL)
1989 Manchester	Li Hongling (CHN)	María Isabel Urrutia (COL)	Judy Oakes (GBR)
1990 Sarajevo	María Isabel Urrutia (COL)	Valkana Tosheva (BUL)	Chung Sook-kwon (KOR)
1991 Donaueschingen	Li Hongling (CHN)	María Isabel Urrutia (COL)	Chen Shu-chih (TPE)
1992 Varna	Zhang Xiaoli (CHN)	Chen Shu-chih (TPE)	Valkana Tosheva (BUL)
1993 Melbourne	Chen Shu-chih (TPE)	Panagiota Antonopoulou (GRE)	Bharti Singh (IND)
1994 Istanbul	María Isabel Urrutia (COL)	Chen Shu-chih (TPE)	Derya Açikgöz (TUR)
1995 Guangzhou	Chen Shu-chih (TPE)	María Isabel Urrutia (COL)	Panagiota Antonopoulou (GRE)
1996 Warsaw	Wei Xiangying (CHN)	Chen Shu-chih (TPE)	María Isabel Urrutia (COL)
1997 Chiang Mai	Tang Weifang (CHN)	María Isabel Urrutia (COL)	Aye Mon Khin (MYA)
2017 Anaheim	Anastasiia Hotfrid (GEO)	María Fernanda Valdés (CHI)	Crismery Santana (DOM)
2018 Ashgabat	Ao Hui (CHN)	Kim Un-ju (PRK)	Crismery Santana (DOM)
2019 Pattaya	Wang Zhouyu (CHN)	Kim Un-ju (PRK)	Tamara Salazar (ECU)
2021 Tashkent	Mönkhjantsangiin Ankhtsetseg (MGL)	Tursunoy Jabborova (UZB)	Solfrid Koanda (NOR)
2022 Bogotá	Solfrid Koanda (NOR)	Eileen Cikamatana (AUS)	Tursunoy Jabborova (UZB)
2023 Riyadh	Lo Ying-yuan (TPE)	Yeinny Geles (COL)	Jung A-ram (KOR)
2024 Manama	Wu Yan (CHN)	Eileen Cikamatana (AUS)	Kim Yong-ju (PRK)
2025 Førde	Solfrid Koanda (NOR)	Yudelina Mejía (DOM)	Eileen Cikamatana (AUS)
2026 Ningbo	Liao Guifang (CHN)	Alina Marushchak (BRN)	Yudelina Mejía (DOM)

== Super heavyweight ==
- +82.5 kg: 1987–1992
- +83 kg: 1993–1997
- +75 kg: 1998–2015
- +90 kg: 2017
- +87 kg: 2018–2024
- +86 kg: 2025–

Games	Gold	Silver	Bronze
1987 Daytona Beach	Han Changmei (CHN)	Becky Levi (USA)	Snejana Vasileva (BUL)
1988 Jakarta	Han Changmei (CHN)	Karyn Marshall (USA)	Veronika Tóbiás (HUN)
1989 Manchester	Han Changmei (CHN)	Karyn Marshall (USA)	Carol Cady (USA)
1990 Sarajevo	Li Yajuan (CHN)	Karyn Marshall (USA)	Christina Ilieva (BUL)
1991 Donaueschingen	Li Yajuan (CHN)	Carla Garrett (USA)	Erika Takács (HUN)
1992 Varna	Li Yajuan (CHN)	Erika Takács (HUN)	Eridania Segura (DOM)
1993 Melbourne	Li Yajuan (CHN)	Carla Garrett (USA)	Lubov Grigurko (UKR)
1994 Istanbul	Karoliina Lundahl (FIN)	Chen Hsiao-lien (TPE)	Myrtle Augee (GBR)
1995 Guangzhou	Erika Takács (HUN)	Chen Hsiao-lien (TPE)	Karoliina Lundahl (FIN)
1996 Warsaw	Wan Ni (CHN)	Karoliina Lundahl (FIN)	Chen Hsiao-lien (TPE)
1997 Chiang Mai	Ma Runmei (CHN)	Chen Shu-chih (TPE)	Aye Aye Aung (MYA)
1998 Lahti	Tang Gonghong (CHN)	Chen Hsiao-lien (TPE)	María Isabel Urrutia (COL)
1999 Athens	Ding Meiyuan (CHN)	Agata Wróbel (POL)	Balkisu Musa (NGR)
2001 Antalya	Albina Khomich (RUS)	Agata Wróbel (POL)	Chen Hsiao-lien (TPE)
2002 Warsaw	Agata Wróbel (POL)	Albina Khomich (RUS)	Tang Gonghong (CHN)
2003 Vancouver	Ding Meiyuan (CHN)	Albina Khomich (RUS)	Olha Korobka (UKR)
2005 Doha	Jang Mi-ran (KOR)	Mu Shuangshuang (CHN)	Cheryl Haworth (USA)
2006 Santo Domingo	Jang Mi-ran (KOR)	Mu Shuangshuang (CHN)	Olha Korobka (UKR)
2007 Chiang Mai	Jang Mi-ran (KOR)	Mu Shuangshuang (CHN)	Olha Korobka (UKR)
2009 Goyang	Jang Mi-ran (KOR)	Tatiana Kashirina (RUS)	Meng Suping (CHN)
2010 Antalya	Tatiana Kashirina (RUS)	Meng Suping (CHN)	Jang Mi-ran (KOR)
2011 Paris	Zhou Lulu (CHN)	Tatiana Kashirina (RUS)	Mariam Usman (NGR)
2013 Wrocław	Tatiana Kashirina (RUS)	Zhou Lulu (CHN)	Chitchanok Pulsabsakul (THA)
2014 Almaty	Tatiana Kashirina (RUS)	Meng Suping (CHN)	Chitchanok Pulsabsakul (THA)
2015 Houston	Tatiana Kashirina (RUS)	Meng Suping (CHN)	Kim Kuk-hyang (PRK)
2017 Anaheim	Sarah Robles (USA)	Laurel Hubbard (NZL)	Shaimaa Khalaf (EGY)
2018 Ashgabat	Tatiana Kashirina (RUS)	Meng Suping (CHN)	Kim Kuk-hyang (PRK)
2019 Pattaya	Li Wenwen (CHN)	Tatiana Kashirina (RUS)	Meng Suping (CHN)
2021 Tashkent	Son Young-hee (KOR)	Duangaksorn Chaidee (THA)	Emily Campbell (GBR)
2022 Bogotá	Li Wenwen (CHN)	Emily Campbell (GBR)	Duangaksorn Chaidee (THA)
2023 Riyadh	Park Hye-jeong (KOR)	Mary Theisen-Lappen (USA)	Lisseth Ayoví (ECU)
2024 Manama	Li Yan (CHN)	Park Hye-jeong (KOR)	Son Young-hee (KOR)
2025 Førde	Park Hye-jeong (KOR)	Marifélix Sarría (CUB)	Mary Theisen-Lappen (USA)
2026 Ningbo	Li Yan (CHN)	Park Hye-jeong (KOR)	Kim Hyo-eon (KOR)

== Medal table ==
Rank	Nation	Gold	Silver	Bronze	Total
1	China	154	55	17	226
2	Russia	18	22	14	54
3	Chinese Taipei	17	22	24	63
4	North Korea	16	17	17	50
5	Thailand	8	17	19	44
6	South Korea	8	11	17	36
7	United States	7	17	15	39
8	Kazakhstan	7	4	3	14
9	Colombia	6	14	11	31
10	Bulgaria	5	20	22	47
11	Egypt	4	3	4	11
12	India	3	10	5	18
13	Hungary	2	11	12	25
14	Turkey	2	8	8	18
15	Greece	2	6	6	14
16	Indonesia	2	4	6	12
17	Spain	2	2	3	7
18	Poland	2	2	1	5
19	Ukraine	2	1	8	11
20	Romania	2	1	3	6
21	Finland	2	1	1	4
22	Norway	2	0	1	3
23	Belarus	1	4	2	7
24	Turkmenistan	1	1	0	2
25	Philippines	1	0	4	5
26	Armenia	1	0	3	4
27	Azerbaijan	1	0	0	1
27	Georgia	1	0	0	1
27	Mongolia	1	0	0	1
27	Tunisia	1	0	0	1
31	Japan	0	7	7	14
32	Nigeria	0	4	4	8
33	Ecuador	0	3	9	12
34	Great Britain	0	2	5	7
35	Australia	0	2	2	4
36	Cuba	0	2	0	2
37	Dominican Republic	0	1	6	7
38	Canada	0	1	4	5
39	Vietnam	0	1	2	3
40	Bahrain	0	1	1	2
40	Uzbekistan	0	1	1	2
42	Chile	0	1	0	1
42	Madagascar	0	1	0	1
42	New Zealand	0	1	0	1
45	Myanmar	0	0	3	3
46	France	0	0	2	2
46	Latvia	0	0	2	2
46	Mexico	0	0	2	2
46	Russian Weightlifting Federation (Note: At the 2021 World Championships, in accordance with a ban by the World Anti-Doping Agency (WADA) and a decision by the Court of Arbitration for Sport (CAS), weightlifters from Russia were not permitted to use the Russian name, flag, or anthem. They instead participated under the name and the modified flag of the Russian Weightlifting Federation (RWF).)	0	0	2	2
50	Macau	0	0	1	1
50	Sweden	0	0	1	1
50	Venezuela	0	0	1	1
Totals (52 entries)		281	281	281	843

- Names in italic are national entities that no longer exist.

== See also ==
- List of Olympic medalists in weightlifting
