= Weightlifting at the 1993 National Games of China =

Weightlifting was part of the 1993 National Games of China held in Beijing. For the first time in National Games history women were part of the event. Men competed in ten and women in nine weight classes.

The competition program at the National Games mirrors that of the Olympic Games as medals are only awarded for the total achieved, but not for individual lifts in either the snatch or clean and jerk. Likewise an athlete failing to register a snatch result cannot advance to the clean and jerk.

== Medal summary ==
=== Men ===
Event	Gold		Silver		Bronze	
54 kg	Yang Bin; Guangxi	272.5 kg	Liu Shoubin; Sichuan	267.5 kg	Lin Yuan; Henan	265 kg
59 kg	Tang Lingsheng; Guangxi	292.5 kg	Qiu Shanlin; Guangxi	290 kg	He Yingqiang; Guangdong	285 kg
64 kg	Peng Song; Hunan	312.5 kg	Feng Ming; Jiangsu	312.5 kg	Huang Bo; Guangxi	312.5 kg
70 kg	Chen Xian; Jiangsu	337.5 kg	Wang Yong; Sichuan	332.5 kg	Li Jinhe; Guangdong	332.5 kg
76 kg	Ma Wenzhu; Shandong	357.5 kg	Lin Shoufeng; Shandong	345 kg	Tao Chuang; Guangxi	345 kg
83 kg	Li Yunnan; Jiangsu	372.5 kg	Wang Yuanfeng; Guangdong	352.5 kg	Xia Hui; Hunan	342.5 kg
91 kg	Wang Baofu; Tianjin	370 kg	Wang Hai; Shandong	365 kg	Li Zhongping; Liaoning	365 kg
99 kg	Wang Jianmin; Beijing	367.5 kg	Liu Kai; Liaoning	360 kg	Li Yan; Liaoning	357.5 kg
108 kg	Cui Wenhua; Jiangsu	395 kg	Wang Weirong; Shanghai	377.5 kg	Yu Qi; Shandong	367.5 kg
108+ kg	Cai Li; Liaoning	415 kg	Wei Tiehan; Hebei	397.5 kg	Jiang Kai; Heilongjiang	390 kg

=== Women ===
Event	Gold		Silver		Bronze	
46 kg	Guan Hong; Hubei	200 kg	Xing Fen; Guangdong	187.5 kg	Luo Hongwei; Hunan	177.5 kg
50 kg	Liu Xiuhua; Guangdong	217.5 kg	Liao Suping; Hunan	215 kg	Li Fengying; Hunan	200 kg
54 kg	Chen Xiaomin; Guangdong	232.5 kg	Long Yuling; Hunan	230 kg	Ma Na; Liaoning	212.5 kg
59 kg	Sun Caiyan; Liaoning	250 kg	Zou Feie; Hunan	245 kg	Wu Haiqing; Guangdong	242.5 kg
64 kg	Li Hongyun; Jiangsu	257.5 kg	Lei Li; PLA	255 kg	Gao Jinchun; Hunan	245 kg
70 kg	Li Changping; Shanxi	272.5 kg	Qu Lihua; Liaoning	270 kg	Wang Genying "Coal mine"	265 kg
76 kg	Hua Ju; Liaoning	290 kg	Zhang Guimei; Heilongjiang	262.5 kg	Li Yan; Hunan	257.5 kg
83 kg	Xing Shuwen; Liaoning	285 kg	Zhang Xiaoli; Jilin	282.5 kg	Shi Wen; Jiangsu	272.5 kg
83+ kg	Li Yajuan; Jilin	295 kg	Li Hongling; Liaoning	292.5 kg	Wan Ni; Shandong	280 kg

== Medal table ==
Rank	Delegation	Gold	Silver	Bronze	Total
1	Liaoning	4	3	3	10
2	Jiangsu	4	1	1	6
3	Guangdong	2	2	3	7
4	Guangxi	2	1	2	5
5	Hunan	1	3	5	9
6	Shandong	1	2	2	5
7	Jilin	1	1	0	2
8	Beijing	1	0	0	1
8	Hubei	1	0	0	1
8	Shanxi	1	0	0	1
8	Tianjin	1	0	0	1
12	Sichuan	0	2	0	2
13	Heilongjiang	0	1	1	2
14	Hebei	0	1	0	1
14	People's Liberation Army	0	1	0	1
14	Shanghai	0	1	0	1
17	"Coal mine"	0	0	1	1
17	Henan	0	0	1	1
Totals (18 entries)		19	19	19	57
