= 1996 World Weightlifting Championships – Women's 76 kg =

The 1996 World Weightlifting Championships were held in Warsaw, Poland from 3 May to 11 May. The women's competition in the 76 kilograms division was staged on 9 May 1996.

== Medalists ==
| Event | Gold | | Silver | | Bronze | |
|---|---|---|---|---|---|---|
| Snatch | Li Yan (CHN) | 97.5 kg | Mária Takács (HUN) | 95.0 kg | Theresa Brick (CAN) | 95.0 kg |
| Clean & Jerk | Li Yan (CHN) | 127.5 kg | Mária Takács (HUN) | 120.0 kg | Panagiota Antonopoulou (GRE) | 120.0 kg |
| Total | Li Yan (CHN) | 225.0 kg | Mária Takács (HUN) | 215.0 kg | Panagiota Antonopoulou (GRE) | 210.0 kg |

== Records ==
Prior to this competition, the existing world records were as follows.

| World record | Snatch | Hua Ju (CHN) | 105.5 kg | Hiroshima, Japan | 5 October 1994 |
| World record | Clean & Jerk | Zhang Guimei (CHN) | 140.0 kg | Shilong, China | 18 December 1993 |
| World record | Total | Zhang Guimei (CHN) | 235.0 kg | Shilong, China | 18 December 1993 |

== Results ==
| Rank | Athlete | Body weight | Snatch (kg) | | | | Clean & Jerk (kg) | | | | Total |
| Rank | Athlete | Body weight | 1 | 2 | 3 | Rank | 1 | 2 | 3 | Rank | Total |
|---|---|---|---|---|---|---|---|---|---|---|---|
| 1st place, gold medalist(s) | Li Yan (CHN) | 74.95 | 95.0 | 97.5 | ~~106.5~~ | 1st place, gold medalist(s) | 122.5 | 127.5 | — | 1st place, gold medalist(s) | 225.0 |
| 2nd place, silver medalist(s) | Mária Takács (HUN) | 74.55 | 95.0 | ~~97.5~~ | ~~97.5~~ | 2nd place, silver medalist(s) | 120.0 | ~~122.5~~ | ~~122.5~~ | 2nd place, silver medalist(s) | 215.0 |
| 3rd place, bronze medalist(s) | Panagiota Antonopoulou (GRE) | 75.50 | ~~90.0~~ | 90.0 | ~~95.0~~ | 7 | ~~120.0~~ | 120.0 | ~~125.0~~ | 3rd place, bronze medalist(s) | 210.0 |
| 4 | Theresa Brick (CAN) | 75.90 | 95.0 | ~~97.5~~ | ~~97.5~~ | 3rd place, bronze medalist(s) | 115.0 | ~~120.0~~ | ~~120.0~~ | 6 | 210.0 |
| 5 | Olga Glaz (RUS) | 71.80 | 90.0 | ~~95.0~~ | ~~95.0~~ | 6 | 110.0 | 115.0 | ~~120.0~~ | 4 | 205.0 |
| 6 | Sumita Laha (IND) | 75.80 | 85.0 | ~~90.0~~ | 90.0 | 8 | 115.0 | ~~120.0~~ | ~~122.5~~ | 5 | 205.0 |
| 7 | Stacey Ketchum (USA) | 75.85 | 85.0 | 87.5 | ~~90.0~~ | 10 | 110.0 | 112.5 | ~~115.0~~ | 7 | 200.0 |
| 8 | Mónica Carrió (ESP) | 71.05 | 85.0 | 90.0 | ~~92.5~~ | 5 | 100.0 | 105.0 | ~~107.5~~ | 10 | 195.0 |
| 9 | Filippia Kochliaridou (GRE) | 75.10 | 82.5 | 87.5 | ~~90.0~~ | 9 | 102.5 | 107.5 | ~~110.0~~ | 8 | 195.0 |
| 10 | Arlys Johnson (USA) | 75.90 | 82.5 | ~~87.5~~ | 87.5 | 11 | 102.5 | 107.5 | ~~110.0~~ | 9 | 195.0 |
| 11 | Margarita Rojas (COL) | 75.15 | 75.0 | 80.0 | ~~85.0~~ | 12 | 95.0 | ~~100.0~~ | 100.0 | 11 | 180.0 |
| — | Derya Açikgöz (TUR) | 75.35 | ~~92.5~~ | 92.5 | ~~97.5~~ | 4 | ~~122.5~~ | ~~122.5~~ | ~~122.5~~ | — | — |
