= 1996 World Weightlifting Championships – Women's +83 kg =

The 1996 World Weightlifting Championships were held in Warsaw, Poland from 3 May to 11 May. The women's competition in the +83 kilograms division was staged on 11 May.

== Medalists ==
Event	Gold		Silver		Bronze	
Snatch	Karoliina Lundahl (FIN)	107.5 kg	Wan Ni (CHN)	102.5 kg	Sylvie Iskin (FRA)	102.5 kg
Clean & Jerk	Wan Ni (CHN)	137.5 kg	Chen Hsiao-lien (TPE)	130.0 kg	Karoliina Lundahl (FIN)	125.0 kg
Total	Wan Ni (CHN)	240.0 kg	Karoliina Lundahl (FIN)	232.5 kg	Chen Hsiao-lien (TPE)	227.5 kg

== Records ==
Prior to this competition, the existing world records were as follows.

World record	Snatch	Wan Ni (CHN)	108.0 kg	Guangzhou, China	25 November 1995
World record	Clean & Jerk	Li Yajuan (CHN)	155.0 kg	Melbourne, Australia	20 November 1993
World record	Total	Li Yajuan (CHN)	260.0 kg	Melbourne, Australia	20 November 1993

== Results ==
Rank	Athlete	Body weight	Snatch (kg)				Clean & Jerk (kg)				Total
Rank	Athlete	Body weight	1	2	3	Rank	1	2	3	Rank	Total
1st place, gold medalist(s)	Wan Ni (CHN)	84.40	102.5	~~107.5~~	~~110.0~~	2nd place, silver medalist(s)	130.0	135.0	137.5	1st place, gold medalist(s)	240.0
2nd place, silver medalist(s)	Karoliina Lundahl (FIN)	83.10	100.0	105.0	107.5	1st place, gold medalist(s)	125.0	~~127.5~~	~~127.5~~	3rd place, bronze medalist(s)	232.5
3rd place, bronze medalist(s)	Chen Hsiao-lien (TPE)	100.40	~~95.0~~	~~97.5~~	97.5	5	130.0	~~137.5~~	~~137.5~~	2nd place, silver medalist(s)	227.5
4	Sylvie Iskin (FRA)	96.85	~~100.0~~	100.0	102.5	3rd place, bronze medalist(s)	117.5	~~122.5~~	122.5	4	225.0
5	Erika Takács (HUN)	96.00	97.5	~~100.0~~	~~100.0~~	4	120.0	~~125.0~~	~~125.0~~	5	217.5
6	Stamatia Bontozi (GRE)	108.90	82.5	~~85.0~~	87.5	7	110.0	115.0	~~117.5~~	6	202.5
7	Decia Stenzel (USA)	85.60	~~90.0~~	90.0	~~95.0~~	6	105.0	~~110.0~~	~~110.0~~	7	195.0
