= 1996 World Weightlifting Championships =

International weightlifting competition

- Host city: Warsaw, Poland
- Dates: 3–11 May 1996

The 1996 Women's World Weightlifting Championships were held in Warsaw, Poland from May 3 to May 11, 1996. There were 102 women in action from 24 nations.

== Medal summary ==
Event	Gold		Silver		Bronze	
46 kg
Snatch	Guan Hong; China	77.5 kg	Tsai Huey-woan; Chinese Taipei	70.0 kg	Kunjarani Devi; India	67.5 kg
Clean & Jerk	Guan Hong; China	95.0 kg	Kunjarani Devi; India	90.0 kg	Tsai Huey-woan; Chinese Taipei	87.5 kg
Total	Guan Hong; China	172.5 kg	Kunjarani Devi; India	157.5 kg	Tsai Huey-woan; Chinese Taipei	157.5 kg
50 kg
Snatch	Liu Xiuhua; China	80.0 kg	Choi Myung-shik; South Korea	80.0 kg	Chu Nan-mei; Chinese Taipei	77.5 kg
Clean & Jerk	Liu Xiuhua; China	105.0 kg	Chu Nan-mei; Chinese Taipei	95.0 kg	Choi Myung-shik; South Korea	95.0 kg
Total	Liu Xiuhua; China	185.0 kg	Choi Myung-shik; South Korea	175.0 kg	Chu Nan-mei; Chinese Taipei	172.5 kg
54 kg
Snatch	Zhang Xixiang; China	87.5 kg	Kuo Ping-chun; Chinese Taipei	85.0 kg	Karnam Malleswari; India	85.0 kg
Clean & Jerk	Zhang Xixiang; China	110.0 kg	Kuo Ping-chun; Chinese Taipei	102.5 kg	Karnam Malleswari; India	102.5 kg
Total	Zhang Xixiang; China	197.5 kg	Kuo Ping-chun; Chinese Taipei	187.5 kg	Karnam Malleswari; India	187.5 kg
59 kg
Snatch	Chen Xiaomin; China	99.0 kg WR	Maria Christoforidou; Greece	90.0 kg	Yuriko Takahashi; Japan	85.0 kg
Clean & Jerk	Yuriko Takahashi; Japan	112.5 kg	Chen Xiaomin; China	110.0 kg	Maria Christoforidou; Greece	107.5 kg
Total	Chen Xiaomin; China	207.5 kg	Maria Christoforidou; Greece	197.5 kg	Yuriko Takahashi; Japan	197.5 kg
64 kg
Snatch	Li Hongyun; China	106.0 kg WR	Chen Jui-lien; Chinese Taipei	100.0 kg	Bénédicte Comblez; France	90.0 kg
Clean & Jerk	Li Hongyun; China	120.0 kg	Chen Jui-lien; Chinese Taipei	115.0 kg	Choi Eun-ja; South Korea	115.0 kg
Total	Li Hongyun; China	225.0 kg	Chen Jui-lien; Chinese Taipei	215.0 kg	Huang Hsi-li; Chinese Taipei	202.5 kg
70 kg
Snatch	Ilona Dankó; Hungary	97.5 kg	Tang Weifang; China	95.0 kg	Irina Komendanskaya; Russia	92.5 kg
Clean & Jerk	Tang Weifang; China	127.5 kg	Irina Kasimova; Russia	122.5 kg	Kim Dong-hee; South Korea	120.0 kg
Total	Tang Weifang; China	222.5 kg	Irina Kasimova; Russia	212.5 kg	Kim Dong-hee; South Korea	212.5 kg
76 kg
Snatch	Li Yan; China	97.5 kg	Mária Takács; Hungary	95.0 kg	Theresa Brick; Canada	95.0 kg
Clean & Jerk	Li Yan; China	127.5 kg	Mária Takács; Hungary	120.0 kg	Panagiota Antonopoulou; Greece	120.0 kg
Total	Li Yan; China	225.0 kg	Mária Takács; Hungary	215.0 kg	Panagiota Antonopoulou; Greece	210.0 kg
83 kg
Snatch	Wei Xiangying; China	110.0 kg WR	Chen Shu-chih; Chinese Taipei	107.5 kg	María Isabel Urrutia; Colombia	100.0 kg
Clean & Jerk	María Isabel Urrutia; Colombia	135.0 kg	Chen Shu-chih; Chinese Taipei	135.0 kg	Wei Xiangying; China	132.5 kg
Total	Wei Xiangying; China	242.5 kg WR	Chen Shu-chih; Chinese Taipei	242.5 kg	María Isabel Urrutia; Colombia	235.0 kg
+83 kg
Snatch	Karoliina Lundahl; Finland	107.5 kg	Wan Ni; China	102.5 kg	Sylvie Iskin; France	102.5 kg
Clean & Jerk	Wan Ni; China	137.5 kg	Chen Hsiao-lien; Chinese Taipei	130.0 kg	Karoliina Lundahl; Finland	125.0 kg
Total	Wan Ni; China	240.0 kg	Karoliina Lundahl; Finland	232.5 kg	Chen Hsiao-lien; Chinese Taipei	227.5 kg

== Medal table ==
Ranking by Big (Total result) medals

Rank	Nation	Gold	Silver	Bronze	Total
1	China	9	0	0	9
2	Chinese Taipei	0	3	4	7
3	Greece	0	1	1	2
3	India	0	1	1	2
3	South Korea	0	1	1	2
6	Finland	0	1	0	1
6	Hungary	0	1	0	1
6	Russia	0	1	0	1
9	Colombia	0	0	1	1
9	Japan	0	0	1	1
Totals (10 entries)		9	9	9	27

Ranking by all medals: Big (Total result) and Small (Snatch and Clean & Jerk)

Rank	Nation	Gold	Silver	Bronze	Total
1	China	23	3	1	27
2	Hungary	1	3	0	4
3	Finland	1	1	1	3
4	Colombia	1	0	2	3
4	Japan	1	0	2	3
6	Chinese Taipei	0	12	6	18
7	India	0	2	4	6
7	South Korea	0	2	4	6
9	Greece	0	2	3	5
10	Russia	0	2	1	3
11	France	0	0	2	2
12	Canada	0	0	1	1
Totals (12 entries)		27	27	27	81

== Participating nations ==
102 competitors from 24 nations competed.

- Australia (3)
- Belarus (1)
- Bulgaria (7)
- Canada (3)
- China (9)
- Chinese Taipei (9)
- Colombia (3)
- Czech Republic (3)
- Finland (4)
- France (4)
- Germany (1)
- Great Britain (1)
- Greece (9)
- Hungary (6)
- India (5)
- Italy (2)
- Japan (5)
- Mexico (1)
- Poland (2)
- Russia (8)
- South Korea (3)
- Spain (3)
- Turkey (1)
- United States (9)

== See also ==
- Weightlifting at the 1996 Summer Olympics
