= 1996 World Weightlifting Championships – Women's 54 kg =

The 1996 World Weightlifting Championships were held in Warsaw, Poland from 3 May to 11 May. The women's competition in the 54 kilograms division was staged on 5 May.

== Medalists ==
| Event | Gold | | Silver | | Bronze | |
|---|---|---|---|---|---|---|
| Snatch | Zhang Xixiang (CHN) | 87.5 kg | Kuo Ping-chun (TPE) | 85.0 kg | Karnam Malleswari (IND) | 85.0 kg |
| Clean & Jerk | Zhang Xixiang (CHN) | 110.0 kg | Kuo Ping-chun (TPE) | 102.5 kg | Karnam Malleswari (IND) | 102.5 kg |
| Total | Zhang Xixiang (CHN) | 197.5 kg | Kuo Ping-chun (TPE) | 187.5 kg | Karnam Malleswari (IND) | 187.5 kg |

== Records ==
Prior to this competition, the existing world records were as follows.

| World record | Snatch | Zhang Juhua (CHN) | 92.5 kg | Hiroshima, Japan | 3 October 1994 |
| World record | Clean & Jerk | Zhang Xixiang (CHN) | 113.5 kg | Yachiyo, Japan | 5 April 1996 |
| World record | Total | Zhang Juhua (CHN) | 202.5 kg | Hiroshima, Japan | 3 October 1994 |

== Results ==
| Rank | Athlete | Body weight | Snatch (kg) | | | | Clean & Jerk (kg) | | | | Total |
| Rank | Athlete | Body weight | 1 | 2 | 3 | Rank | 1 | 2 | 3 | Rank | Total |
|---|---|---|---|---|---|---|---|---|---|---|---|
| 1st place, gold medalist(s) | Zhang Xixiang (CHN) | 54.00 | 82.5 | 87.5 | ~~90.0~~ | 1st place, gold medalist(s) | 105.0 | ~~110.0~~ | 110.0 | 1st place, gold medalist(s) | 197.5 |
| 2nd place, silver medalist(s) | Kuo Ping-chun (TPE) | 53.60 | 80.0 | 85.0 | ~~87.5~~ | 2nd place, silver medalist(s) | 102.5 | ~~107.5~~ | ~~107.5~~ | 2nd place, silver medalist(s) | 187.5 |
| 3rd place, bronze medalist(s) | Karnam Malleswari (IND) | 53.90 | 80.0 | ~~85.0~~ | 85.0 | 3rd place, bronze medalist(s) | ~~102.5~~ | ~~102.5~~ | 102.5 | 3rd place, bronze medalist(s) | 187.5 |
| 4 | Neli Yankova (BUL) | 53.05 | 75.0 | ~~80.0~~ | ~~80.0~~ | 5 | 95.0 | 100.0 | ~~102.5~~ | 4 | 175.0 |
| 5 | Maryse Turcotte (CAN) | 53.85 | 67.5 | 70.0 | ~~72.5~~ | 7 | 90.0 | 95.0 | ~~97.5~~ | 5 | 165.0 |
| 6 | Alfia Galieva (RUS) | 53.95 | 65.0 | ~~70.0~~ | ~~70.0~~ | 11 | 90.0 | 95.0 | ~~97.5~~ | 6 | 160.0 |
| 7 | Evdokia Chatziavramidou (GRE) | 53.05 | 62.5 | 65.0 | ~~67.5~~ | 9 | 87.5 | ~~92.5~~ | 92.5 | 7 | 157.5 |
| 8 | Melania Locci (ITA) | 53.40 | 62.5 | ~~67.5~~ | 67.5 | 8 | 85.0 | 90.0 | ~~92.5~~ | 8 | 157.5 |
| 9 | Ursula Garza-Kechko (USA) | 53.70 | 67.5 | 70.0 | ~~72.5~~ | 6 | 82.5 | ~~87.5~~ | ~~87.5~~ | 11 | 152.5 |
| 10 | Valérie Ninvirth (FRA) | 53.25 | 65.0 | ~~70.0~~ | ~~70.0~~ | 10 | ~~82.5~~ | ~~82.5~~ | 82.5 | 10 | 147.5 |
| 11 | Soraya Jiménez (MEX) | 53.85 | 60.0 | ~~65.0~~ | ~~65.0~~ | 14 | 80.0 | 85.0 | 87.5 | 9 | 147.5 |
| 12 | Maritta Tarkiainen (FIN) | 54.00 | 65.0 | ~~67.5~~ | ~~67.5~~ | 12 | 77.5 | 80.0 | ~~82.5~~ | 13 | 145.0 |
| 13 | Gabriella Máthé (HUN) | 52.50 | 57.5 | 62.5 | ~~65.0~~ | 13 | ~~80.0~~ | ~~80.0~~ | 80.0 | 12 | 142.5 |
| — | Robin Goad (USA) | 52.50 | 77.5 | 80.0 | ~~82.5~~ | 4 | ~~95.0~~ | ~~95.0~~ | ~~95.0~~ | — | — |
