= 1996 World Weightlifting Championships – Women's 50 kg =

The 1996 World Weightlifting Championships were held in Warsaw, Poland from 3 May to 11 May. The women's competition in the 50 kilograms division was staged on 4 May.

== Medalists ==
Event	Gold		Silver		Bronze	
Snatch	Liu Xiuhua (CHN)	80.0 kg	Choi Myung-shik (KOR)	80.0 kg	Chu Nan-mei (TPE)	77.5 kg
Clean & Jerk	Liu Xiuhua (CHN)	105.0 kg	Chu Nan-mei (TPE)	95.0 kg	Choi Myung-shik (KOR)	95.0 kg
Total	Liu Xiuhua (CHN)	185.0 kg	Choi Myung-shik (KOR)	175.0 kg	Chu Nan-mei (TPE)	172.5 kg

== Records ==
Prior to this competition, the existing world records were as follows.

World record	Snatch	Jiang Baoyu (CHN)	88.0 kg	Busan, South Korea	3 July 1995
World record	Clean & Jerk	Liu Xiuhua (CHN)	110.5 kg	Hiroshima, Japan	3 October 1994
World record	Total	Liu Xiuhua (CHN)	197.5 kg	Hiroshima, Japan	3 October 1994

== Results ==
Rank	Athlete	Body weight	Snatch (kg)				Clean & Jerk (kg)				Total
Rank	Athlete	Body weight	1	2	3	Rank	1	2	3	Rank	Total
1st place, gold medalist(s)	Liu Xiuhua (CHN)	49.90	~~77.5~~	~~80.0~~	80.0	1st place, gold medalist(s)	100.0	102.5	105.0	1st place, gold medalist(s)	185.0
2nd place, silver medalist(s)	Choi Myung-shik (KOR)	49.95	75.0	77.5	80.0	2nd place, silver medalist(s)	95.0	~~100.0~~	~~100.0~~	3rd place, bronze medalist(s)	175.0
3rd place, bronze medalist(s)	Chu Nan-mei (TPE)	49.15	75.0	77.5	~~80.0~~	3rd place, bronze medalist(s)	95.0	~~97.5~~	~~97.5~~	2nd place, silver medalist(s)	172.5
4	Izabela Rifatova (BUL)	49.75	72.5	77.5	~~80.0~~	4	~~92.5~~	92.5	~~97.5~~	4	170.0
5	Anna Stroubou (GRE)	49.45	70.0	72.5	~~75.0~~	5	85.0	~~87.5~~	87.5	6	160.0
6	Noriko Hasegawa (JPN)	50.00	67.5	~~70.0~~	70.0	6	~~85.0~~	85.0	90.0	5	160.0
7	Siyka Stoeva (BUL)	49.60	67.5	~~70.0~~	~~70.0~~	7	~~85.0~~	85.0	~~90.0~~	7	152.5
8	Csilla Földi (HUN)	49.35	60.0	65.0	~~67.5~~	8	80.0	~~85.0~~	~~85.0~~	9	145.0
9	Erzsébet Nagy (HUN)	49.05	57.5	~~60.0~~	~~60.0~~	10	75.0	80.0	~~82.5~~	8	137.5
—	Amanda Inman (AUS)	49.05	57.5	~~60.0~~	~~60.0~~	9	~~72.5~~	~~72.5~~	~~72.5~~	—	—
