= Mannironi =

Mannironi is a surname. Notable people with the surname include:

- Angelo Mannironi (born 1961), Italian weightlifter
- Sebastiano Mannironi (1930–2015), Italian weightlifter, father of Angelo and Sergio
- Sergio Mannironi (born 1967), Italian weightlifter
