= 1993 World Weightlifting Championships =

World Championships

1993 World Championships
- Host city: Melbourne, Australia
- Dates: November 11–21, 1993

The 1993 World Weightlifting Championships were held in Melbourne, Australia from November 11 to November 21, 1993.

== Medal summary ==
=== Men ===
Event	Gold		Silver		Bronze	
54 kg
Snatch	Yang Bing; China	122.5 kg	Halil Mutlu; Turkey	122.5 kg	Ko Kwang-ku; South Korea	120.0 kg
Clean & Jerk	Ivan Ivanov; Bulgaria	157.5 kg	Halil Mutlu; Turkey	152.5 kg	Ko Kwang-ku; South Korea	150.0 kg
Total	Ivan Ivanov; Bulgaria	277.5 kg WR	Halil Mutlu; Turkey	275.0 kg	Ko Kwang-ku; South Korea	270.0 kg
59 kg
Snatch	Nikolay Peshalov; Bulgaria	137.5 kg	Hafız Süleymanoğlu; Turkey	135.0 kg	Qiu Shanlin; China	132.5 kg
Clean & Jerk	Nikolay Peshalov; Bulgaria	167.5 kg WR	Georgios Tzelilis; Greece	165.0 kg	Tang Lingsheng; China	162.5 kg
Total	Nikolay Peshalov; Bulgaria	305.0 kg WR	Hafız Süleymanoğlu; Turkey	295.0 kg	Tang Lingsheng; China	292.5 kg
64 kg
Snatch	Naim Süleymanoğlu; Turkey	145.0 kg	Zhang Youyi; China	142.5 kg	Ri Hi-bong; North Korea	142.5 kg
Clean & Jerk	Naim Süleymanoğlu; Turkey	177.5 kg WR	Valerios Leonidis; Greece	175.0 kg	Yurik Sarkisyan; Armenia	175.0 kg
Total	Naim Süleymanoğlu; Turkey	322.5 kg WR	Ri Hi-bong; North Korea	317.5 kg	Yurik Sarkisyan; Armenia	315.0 kg
70 kg
Snatch	Yoto Yotov; Bulgaria	155.0 kg	Ergün Batmaz; Turkey	150.0 kg	Vasil Vanev; Bulgaria	150.0 kg
Clean & Jerk	Yoto Yotov; Bulgaria	187.5 kg	Andreas Behm; Germany	185.0 kg	Kim Hak-bong; South Korea	182.5 kg
Total	Yoto Yotov; Bulgaria	342.5 kg	Ergün Batmaz; Turkey	332.5 kg	Andreas Behm; Germany	330.0 kg
76 kg
Snatch	Ruslan Savchenko; Ukraine	170.0 kg WR	Kim Myong-nam; North Korea	167.5 kg	Altymyrat Orazdurdyýew; Turkmenistan	167.5 kg
Clean & Jerk	Altymyrat Orazdurdyýew; Turkmenistan	202.5 kg WR	Ruslan Savchenko; Ukraine	200.0 kg	Khachatur Kyapanaktsyan; Armenia	197.5 kg
Total	Altymyrat Orazdurdyýew; Turkmenistan	370.0 kg WR	Ruslan Savchenko; Ukraine	370.0 kg	Kim Myong-nam; North Korea	362.5 kg
83 kg
Snatch	Pyrros Dimas; Greece	175.0 kg	Oleksandr Blyshchyk; Ukraine	175.0 kg	László Barsi; Hungary	172.5 kg
Clean & Jerk	Marc Huster; Germany	210.0 kg WR	Kiril Kounev; Australia	207.5 kg	Wang Yuanfeng; China	202.5 kg
Total	Pyrros Dimas; Greece	377.5 kg	Marc Huster; Germany	375.0 kg	Kiril Kounev; Australia	372.5 kg
91 kg
Snatch	Ivan Chakarov; Bulgaria	185.0 kg WR	Anatoly Khrapaty; Kazakhstan	180.0 kg	Kakhi Kakhiashvili; Georgia	180.0 kg
Clean & Jerk	Kakhi Kakhiashvili; Georgia	222.5 kg	Ivan Chakarov; Bulgaria	222.5 kg	Anatoly Khrapaty; Kazakhstan	215.0 kg
Total	Ivan Chakarov; Bulgaria	407.5 kg WR	Kakhi Kakhiashvili; Georgia	402.5 kg	Anatoly Khrapaty; Kazakhstan	395.0 kg
99 kg
Snatch	Sergey Syrtsov; Russia	190.0 kg	Nicu Vlad; Australia	190.0 kg WR	Viktor Tregubov; Russia	185.0 kg
Clean & Jerk	Viktor Tregubov; Russia	222.5 kg WR	Sergey Syrtsov; Russia	217.5 kg	Igor Sadykov; Germany	215.0 kg
Total	Viktor Tregubov; Russia	407.5 kg	Sergey Syrtsov; Russia	407.5 kg	Igor Sadykov; Germany	392.5 kg
108 kg
Snatch	Timur Taymazov; Ukraine	195.0 kg	Ihor Razoronov; Ukraine	185.0 kg	Stefan Botev; Australia	185.0 kg
Clean & Jerk	Stefan Botev; Australia	232.5 kg	Ihor Razoronov; Ukraine	230.0 kg	Timur Taymazov; Ukraine	225.0 kg
Total	Timur Taymazov; Ukraine	420.0 kg	Stefan Botev; Australia	417.5 kg	Ihor Razoronov; Ukraine	415.0 kg
+108 kg
Snatch	Ronny Weller; Germany	200.0 kg WR	Manfred Nerlinger; Germany	192.5 kg	Andrey Chemerkin; Russia	190.0 kg
Clean & Jerk	Manfred Nerlinger; Germany	247.5 kg WR	Andrey Chemerkin; Russia	245.0 kg	Ronny Weller; Germany	242.5 kg
Total	Ronny Weller; Germany	442.5 kg WR	Manfred Nerlinger; Germany	440.0 kg	Andrey Chemerkin; Russia	435.0 kg

=== Women ===
Event	Gold		Silver		Bronze	
46 kg
Snatch	Chu Nan-mei; Chinese Taipei	67.5 kg	Donka Mincheva; Bulgaria	67.5 kg	Satomi Saito; Japan	65.0 kg
Clean & Jerk	Chu Nan-mei; Chinese Taipei	85.0 kg	Yu Shiu-fen; Chinese Taipei	85.0 kg WR	Satomi Saito; Japan	82.5 kg
Total	Chu Nan-mei; Chinese Taipei	152.5 kg WR	Yu Shiu-fen; Chinese Taipei	147.5 kg	Satomi Saito; Japan	147.5 kg
50 kg
Snatch	Guan Hong; China	77.5 kg	Liu Xiuhua; China	77.5 kg WR	Kuo Chin-chun; Chinese Taipei	75.0 kg
Clean & Jerk	Liu Xiuhua; China	110.0 kg WR	Guan Hong; China	100.0 kg	Kuo Chin-chun; Chinese Taipei	95.0 kg
Total	Liu Xiuhua; China	187.5 kg WR	Guan Hong; China	177.5 kg	Kuo Chin-chun; Chinese Taipei	170.0 kg
54 kg
Snatch	Chen Xiaomin; China	90.0 kg WR	Robin Byrd; United States	82.5 kg	Karnam Malleswari; India	82.5 kg
Clean & Jerk	Chen Xiaomin; China	110.0 kg WR	Nancy Niro; Canada	97.5 kg	Hiromi Uemura; Japan	95.0 kg
Total	Chen Xiaomin; China	200.0 kg WR	Robin Byrd; United States	177.5 kg	Karnam Malleswari; India	177.5 kg
59 kg
Snatch	Sun Caiyan; China	97.5 kg WR	Gergana Kirilova; Bulgaria	92.5 kg	Maria Christoforidou; Greece	90.0 kg
Clean & Jerk	Sun Caiyan; China	120.0 kg WR	Gergana Kirilova; Bulgaria	110.0 kg	Maria Christoforidou; Greece	107.5 kg
Total	Sun Caiyan; China	217.5 kg WR	Gergana Kirilova; Bulgaria	202.5 kg	Maria Christoforidou; Greece	197.5 kg
64 kg
Snatch	Li Hongyun; China	102.5 kg WR	Erzsébet Márkus; Hungary	90.0 kg	Won Soon-yi; South Korea	87.5 kg
Clean & Jerk	Li Hongyun; China	117.5 kg WR	Won Soon-yi; South Korea	115.0 kg	Yuriko Takahashi; Japan	110.0 kg
Total	Li Hongyun; China	220.0 kg WR	Won Soon-yi; South Korea	202.5 kg	Julie Malenfant; Canada	195.0 kg
70 kg
Snatch	Milena Trendafilova; Bulgaria	100.0 kg WR	Kim Dong-hee; South Korea	92.5 kg	Kumi Haseba; Japan	92.5 kg
Clean & Jerk	Milena Trendafilova; Bulgaria	120.0 kg WR	Kumi Haseba; Japan	115.0 kg	Kim Dong-hee; South Korea	112.5 kg
Total	Milena Trendafilova; Bulgaria	220.0 kg WR	Kumi Haseba; Japan	207.5 kg	Kim Dong-hee; South Korea	205.0 kg
76 kg
Snatch	Hua Ju; China	105.0 kg WR	Li Changping; China	92.5 kg	Mária Takács; Hungary	92.5 kg
Clean & Jerk	Li Changping; China	127.5 kg WR	Hua Ju; China	125.0 kg	Valkana Tosheva; Bulgaria	117.5 kg
Total	Hua Ju; China	230.0 kg WR	Li Changping; China	220.0 kg	Mária Takács; Hungary	207.5 kg
83 kg
Snatch	Xing Shuwen; China	107.5 kg WR	Chen Shu-chih; Chinese Taipei	102.5 kg	Panagiota Antonopoulou; Greece	90.0 kg
Clean & Jerk	Chen Shu-chih; Chinese Taipei	127.5 kg WR	Panagiota Antonopoulou; Greece	125.0 kg	Bharti Singh; India	117.5 kg
Total	Chen Shu-chih; Chinese Taipei	230.0 kg WR	Panagiota Antonopoulou; Greece	215.0 kg	Bharti Singh; India	207.5 kg
+83 kg
Snatch	Li Yajuan; China	105.0 kg WR	Lubov Grigurko; Ukraine	100.0 kg	Carla Garrett; United States	100.0 kg
Clean & Jerk	Li Yajuan; China	155.0 kg WR	Carla Garrett; United States	132.5 kg	Theodoula Spanou; Greece	115.0 kg
Total	Li Yajuan; China	260.0 kg WR	Carla Garrett; United States	232.5 kg	Lubov Grigurko; Ukraine	215.0 kg

== Medal table ==
Ranking by Big (Total result) medals

Rank	Nation	Gold	Silver	Bronze	Total
1	China	6	2	1	9
2	Bulgaria	5	1	0	6
3	Chinese Taipei	2	1	1	4
4	Turkey	1	3	0	4
5	Germany	1	2	2	5
6	Ukraine	1	1	2	4
7	Greece	1	1	1	3
7	Russia	1	1	1	3
9	Turkmenistan	1	0	0	1
10	United States	0	2	0	2
11	South Korea	0	1	2	3
12	Australia	0	1	1	2
12	Japan	0	1	1	2
12	North Korea	0	1	1	2
15	Georgia	0	1	0	1
16	India	0	0	2	2
17	Armenia	0	0	1	1
17	Canada	0	0	1	1
17	Hungary	0	0	1	1
17	Kazakhstan	0	0	1	1
Totals (20 entries)		19	19	19	57

Ranking by all medals: Big (Total result) and Small (Snatch and Clean & Jerk)

Rank	Nation	Gold	Silver	Bronze	Total
1	China	20	7	4	31
2	Bulgaria	13	5	2	20
3	Chinese Taipei	5	3	3	11
4	Germany	4	4	4	12
5	Turkey	3	7	0	10
6	Ukraine	3	6	3	12
7	Russia	3	3	3	9
8	Greece	2	4	5	11
9	Turkmenistan	2	0	1	3
10	Australia	1	3	2	6
11	Georgia	1	1	1	3
12	United States	0	4	1	5
13	South Korea	0	3	7	10
14	Japan	0	2	6	8
15	North Korea	0	2	2	4
16	Hungary	0	1	3	4
17	Kazakhstan	0	1	2	3
18	Canada	0	1	1	2
19	India	0	0	4	4
20	Armenia	0	0	3	3
Totals (20 entries)		57	57	57	171
