= Pirkkiö =

Pirkkiö is a surname. Notable people with the surname include:

- Benjamin Pirkkiö (born 1979), Finnish weightlifter
- Jaarli Pirkkiö (born 1967), Finnish weightlifter
- Riitta Pirkkiö (born 1968), Finnish weightlifter
