= 1988 World Weightlifting Championships =

International weightlifting competition

- Host city: Jakarta, Indonesia
- Dates: 2–4 December 1988

The 1988 Women's World Weightlifting Championships were held in Jakarta, Indonesia from December 2 to December 4, 1988. There were 103 women in action from 23 nations.

== Medal summary ==
Event	Gold		Silver		Bronze	
44 kg
Snatch	Xing Fen; China	60.0 kg	Choi Myung-shik; South Korea	55.0 kg	Ponco Imbarwati; Indonesia	47.5 kg
Clean & Jerk	Xing Fen; China	87.5 kg WR	Choi Myung-shik; South Korea	75.5 kg	Tsai Huey-woan; Chinese Taipei	57.5 kg
Total	Xing Fen; China	147.5 kg WR	Choi Myung-shik; South Korea	130.0 kg	Ponco Imbarwati; Indonesia	105.0 kg
48 kg
Snatch	Huang Xiaoyu; China	70.0 kg	Robin Byrd; United States	67.5 kg	Siti Aisah; Indonesia	62.5 kg
Clean & Jerk	Huang Xiaoyu; China	95.5 kg WR	Siti Aisah; Indonesia	75.0 kg	Robin Byrd; United States	72.5 kg
Total	Huang Xiaoyu; China	165.0 kg	Robin Byrd; United States	140.0 kg	Siti Aisah; Indonesia	137.5 kg
52 kg
Snatch	Peng Liping; China	80.0 kg WR	Yang Su-kuan; Chinese Taipei	68.0 kg	Sandra Gómez; Spain	62.5 kg
Clean & Jerk	Peng Liping; China	95.0 kg WR	Sandra Gómez; Spain	85.0 kg	Kim Oh-sook; South Korea	85.0 kg
Total	Peng Liping; China	175.0 kg WR	Sandra Gómez; Spain	147.5 kg	Kim Oh-sook; South Korea	145.0 kg
56 kg
Snatch	Ma Na; China	75.0 kg	Won Soon-yi; South Korea	70.0 kg	Stéphanie Genna; France	67.5 kg
Clean & Jerk	Ma Na; China	105.0 kg WR	Yang Mei-tzu; Chinese Taipei	87.5 kg	Mina Uotome; Japan	85.0 kg
Total	Ma Na; China	180.0 kg WR	Won Soon-yi; South Korea	155.0 kg	Yang Mei-tzu; Chinese Taipei	152.5 kg
60 kg
Snatch	Yang Jing; China	85.0 kg WR	Maria Christoforidou; Greece	80.0 kg	Colleene Colley; United States	75.0 kg
Clean & Jerk	Yang Jing; China	110.0 kg WR	Colleene Colley; United States	100.0 kg	Maria Christoforidou; Greece	97.5 kg
Total	Yang Jing; China	195.0 kg WR	Maria Christoforidou; Greece	177.5 kg	Colleene Colley; United States	175.0 kg
67.5 kg
Snatch	Guo Qiuxiang; China	95.0 kg WR	Mária Takács; Hungary	87.5 kg	Anikó Triff-Árkosi; Hungary	82.5 kg
Clean & Jerk	Guo Qiuxiang; China	115.0 kg WR	Mária Takács; Hungary	110.0 kg	Jeanette Rose; Great Britain	102.5 kg
Total	Guo Qiuxiang; China	210.0 kg WR	Mária Takács; Hungary	197.5 kg	Jeanette Rose; Great Britain	180.0 kg
75 kg
Snatch	Milena Trendafilova; Bulgaria	90.0 kg	Li Hongling; China	90.0 kg	Senka Asenova; Bulgaria	85.0 kg
Clean & Jerk	Li Hongling; China	122.5 kg WR	Milena Trendafilova; Bulgaria	115.0 kg	Arlys Kovach; United States	112.5 kg
Total	Li Hongling; China	212.5 kg WR	Milena Trendafilova; Bulgaria	205.0 kg	Arlys Kovach; United States	197.5 kg
82.5 kg
Snatch	Li Yanxia; China	97.5 kg WR	Erika Takács; Hungary	92.5 kg	Milena Mileskova; Bulgaria	92.5 kg
Clean & Jerk	Li Yanxia; China	117.5 kg	Erika Takács; Hungary	117.5 kg	Milena Mileskova; Bulgaria	110.0 kg
Total	Li Yanxia; China	215.0 kg	Erika Takács; Hungary	210.0 kg	Milena Mileskova; Bulgaria	202.5 kg
+82.5 kg
Snatch	Han Changmei; China	100.0 kg WR	Karyn Marshall; United States	97.5 kg	Veronika Tóbiás; Hungary	85.0 kg
Clean & Jerk	Han Changmei; China	132.5 kg WR	Karyn Marshall; United States	127.5 kg	Veronika Tóbiás; Hungary	107.5 kg
Total	Han Changmei; China	232.5 kg WR	Karyn Marshall; United States	225.0 kg	Veronika Tóbiás; Hungary	192.5 kg

== Medal table ==
Ranking by Big (Total result) medals

Rank	Nation	Gold	Silver	Bronze	Total
1	China	9	0	0	9
2	United States	0	2	2	4
3	Hungary	0	2	1	3
3	South Korea	0	2	1	3
5	Bulgaria	0	1	1	2
6	Greece	0	1	0	1
6	Spain	0	1	0	1
8	Indonesia	0	0	2	2
9	Chinese Taipei	0	0	1	1
9	Great Britain	0	0	1	1
Totals (10 entries)		9	9	9	27

Ranking by all medals: Big (Total result) and Small (Snatch and Clean & Jerk)

Rank	Nation	Gold	Silver	Bronze	Total
1	China	26	1	0	27
2	Bulgaria	1	2	4	7
3	United States	0	6	5	11
4	Hungary	0	6	4	10
5	South Korea	0	5	2	7
6	Chinese Taipei	0	2	2	4
7	Greece	0	2	1	3
7	Spain	0	2	1	3
9	Indonesia	0	1	4	5
10	Great Britain	0	0	2	2
11	France	0	0	1	1
11	Japan	0	0	1	1
Totals (12 entries)		27	27	27	81

== See also ==
- Weightlifting at the 1988 Summer Olympics
