= 1992 World Weightlifting Championships =

International weightlifting competition

- Host city: Varna, Bulgaria
- Dates: 16–24 May 1992

The 1992 Women's World Weightlifting Championships were held in Varna, Bulgaria from May 16 to May 24, 1992. There were 110 women in action from 25 nations.

== Medal summary ==
Event	Gold		Silver		Bronze	
44 kg
Snatch	Guan Hong; China	75.0 kg WR	Kunjarani Devi; India	65.0 kg	Sibby Flowers; United States	62.5 kg
Clean & Jerk	Guan Hong; China	100.0 kg WR	Kunjarani Devi; India	77.5 kg	Misasanga Wangkiree; Thailand	77.5 kg
Total	Guan Hong; China	175.0 kg WR	Kunjarani Devi; India	142.5 kg	Sibby Flowers; United States	140.0 kg
48 kg
Snatch	Liu Xiuhua; China	82.5 kg WR	Izabela Rifatova; Bulgaria	77.5 kg	Ri Yong-hwa; North Korea	72.5 kg
Clean & Jerk	Liu Xiuhua; China	105.0 kg WR	Izabela Rifatova; Bulgaria	97.5 kg	Donka Mincheva; Bulgaria	92.5 kg
Total	Liu Xiuhua; China	187.5 kg WR	Izabela Rifatova; Bulgaria	175.0 kg	Donka Mincheva; Bulgaria	162.5 kg
52 kg
Snatch	Peng Liping; China	87.5 kg WR	Janeta Georgieva; Bulgaria	77.5 kg	Robin Byrd; United States	77.5 kg
Clean & Jerk	Peng Liping; China	115.0 kg WR	Siyka Stoeva; Bulgaria	97.5 kg	Chhaya Adak; India	95.0 kg
Total	Peng Liping; China	202.5 kg WR	Siyka Stoeva; Bulgaria	172.5 kg	Robin Byrd; United States	172.5 kg
56 kg
Snatch	Sun Caiyan; China	92.5 kg WR	Neli Yankova; Bulgaria	80.0 kg	Ni Chia-ping; Chinese Taipei	80.0 kg
Clean & Jerk	Sun Caiyan; China	117.5 kg WR	Neli Yankova; Bulgaria	102.5 kg	Ni Chia-ping; Chinese Taipei	97.5 kg
Total	Sun Caiyan; China	210.0 kg WR	Neli Yankova; Bulgaria	182.5 kg	Ni Chia-ping; Chinese Taipei	177.5 kg
60 kg
Snatch	Li Hongyun; China	97.5 kg WR	Maria Christoforidou; Greece	90.0 kg	Won Soon-yi; South Korea	87.5 kg
Clean & Jerk	Li Hongyun; China	125.0 kg WR	Gergana Kirilova; Bulgaria	105.0 kg	Maria Christoforidou; Greece	105.0 kg
Total	Li Hongyun; China	222.5 kg WR	Maria Christoforidou; Greece	195.0 kg	Won Soon-yi; South Korea	192.5 kg
67.5 kg
Snatch	Milena Trendafilova; Bulgaria	98.0 kg WR	Gao Lijuan; China	92.5 kg	María Dolores Martínez; Spain	87.5 kg
Clean & Jerk	Gao Lijuan; China	130.0 kg WR	Milena Trendafilova; Bulgaria	122.5 kg	Kim Dong-hee; South Korea	107.5 kg
Total	Gao Lijuan; China	222.5 kg WR	Milena Trendafilova; Bulgaria	220.0 kg	María Dolores Martínez; Spain	192.5 kg
75 kg
Snatch	Hua Ju; China	107.5 kg WR	Arlys Johnson; United States	92.5 kg	Kumi Haseba; Japan	90.0 kg
Clean & Jerk	Hua Ju; China	130.0 kg	Kumi Haseba; Japan	115.0 kg	Mária Takács; Hungary	115.0 kg
Total	Hua Ju; China	237.5 kg	Kumi Haseba; Japan	205.0 kg	Mária Takács; Hungary	205.0 kg
82.5 kg
Snatch	Zhang Xiaoli; China	110.0 kg WR	Chen Shu-chih; Chinese Taipei	95.0 kg	Veronika Tóbiás; Hungary	92.5 kg
Clean & Jerk	Zhang Xiaoli; China	142.5 kg WR	Chen Shu-chih; Chinese Taipei	115.0 kg	Valkana Tosheva; Bulgaria	112.5 kg
Total	Zhang Xiaoli; China	252.5 kg WR	Chen Shu-chih; Chinese Taipei	210.0 kg	Valkana Tosheva; Bulgaria	197.5 kg
+82.5 kg
Snatch	Li Yajuan; China	115.0 kg WR	Sylvie Iskin; France	92.5 kg	Eridania Segura; Dominican Republic	92.5 kg
Clean & Jerk	Li Yajuan; China	150.0 kg WR	Erika Takács; Hungary	122.5 kg	Lubov Grigurko; CIS	110.0 kg
Total	Li Yajuan; China	265.0 kg WR	Erika Takács; Hungary	215.0 kg	Eridania Segura; Dominican Republic	202.5 kg

== Medal table ==
Ranking by Big (Total result) medals

Rank	Nation	Gold	Silver	Bronze	Total
1	China	9	0	0	9
2	Bulgaria	0	4	2	6
3	Chinese Taipei	0	1	1	2
3	Hungary	0	1	1	2
5	Greece	0	1	0	1
5	India	0	1	0	1
5	Japan	0	1	0	1
8	United States	0	0	2	2
9	Dominican Republic	0	0	1	1
9	South Korea	0	0	1	1
9	Spain	0	0	1	1
Totals (11 entries)		9	9	9	27

Ranking by all medals: Big (Total result) and Small (Snatch and Clean & Jerk)

Rank	Nation	Gold	Silver	Bronze	Total
1	China	26	1	0	27
2	Bulgaria	1	12	4	17
3	Chinese Taipei	0	3	3	6
4	India	0	3	1	4
5	Hungary	0	2	3	5
6	Greece	0	2	1	3
6	Japan	0	2	1	3
8	United States	0	1	4	5
9	France	0	1	0	1
10	South Korea	0	0	3	3
11	Dominican Republic	0	0	2	2
11	Spain	0	0	2	2
13	CIS	0	0	1	1
13	North Korea	0	0	1	1
13	Thailand	0	0	1	1
Totals (15 entries)		27	27	27	81

== See also ==
- Weightlifting at the 1992 Summer Olympics
