= Paul Harrison (weightlifter) =

Australian weightlifter

Personal information
- Nationality: Australian
- Born: 11 December 1966 (age 59)

Sport
- Sport: Weightlifting

Paul Harrison (born 11 December 1966) is an Australian former weightlifter. He competed in the men's middleweight event at the 1988 Summer Olympics.
