= Theresa Brick =

Canadian weightlifter (born 1965)

Personal information
- Full name: Theresa Brick
- Born: 4 May 1965 (age 61)
- Weight: 74.93 kg (165.2 lb)

Sport
- Country: Canada
- Sport: Weightlifting, Discus
- Weight class: 75 kg
- Team: National team
- Updated on 28 September 2016

Theresa Brick (born 4 May 1965) is a Canadian weightlifter, competing in the 75 kg category and representing Canada at international competitions. She competed at world championships, most recently at the 1999 World Weightlifting Championships. She also represented Canada as a discus thrower.

Brick was inducted in the Manitoba Sports Hall of Fame in 2005 for weightlifting and athletics.

== Major results ==
Year	Venue	Weight	Snatch (kg)				Clean & Jerk (kg)				Total	Rank
Year	Venue	Weight	1	2	3	Rank	1	2	3	Rank	Total	Rank
World Championships
1996	Warsaw, Poland	76 kg	95	~~97.5~~	~~97.5~~	3rd place, bronze medalist(s)	115	~~120~~	~~120~~	6	210	4
1999	Piraeus, Greece	75 kg	92.5	~~97.5~~	97.5	14	112.5	117.5	120	16	217.5	14
1998	Lahti, Finland	+75 kg	80	85	87.5	12	105	~~110~~	~~110~~	13	192.5	12
