= Ricki Chaplin =

British weightlifter

Personal information
- Nationality: British
- Born: 24 August 1964 (age 60); Bristol, England

Sport
- Sport: Weightlifting

Ricki Chaplin (born 24 August 1964) is a British weightlifter. He competed in the men's middleweight event at the 1988 Summer Olympics.
