= Kálmán Csengeri =

Hungarian weightlifter

Personal information
- Nationality: Hungarian
- Born: 20 September 1959 (age 65); Ózd, Hungary

Sport
- Sport: Weightlifting

Kálmán Csengeri (born 20 September 1959) is a Hungarian weightlifter. He competed in the men's middleweight event at the 1988 Summer Olympics.
