= David Maina =

Kenyan weightlifter

Personal information
- Nationality: Kenyan
- Born: 1 January 1959 (age 66)

Sport
- Sport: Weightlifting

David Maina (born 1 January 1959) is a Kenyan weightlifter. He competed in the men's middleweight event at the 1988 Summer Olympics.
