= Gennady Shchekalo =

Belarusian weightlifter (born 1968)

Personal information
- Full name: Gennady Nikolayevich Shchekalo
- Born: 4 March 1968 (age 58) Minsk
- Weight: 107 kg (236 lb)

Sport
- Country: Belarus
- Sport: Weightlifting
- Weight class: 108 kg
- Team: National team
Medal record
Men's Weightlifting
Representing Belarus
World Championships
Bronze medal – third place	1995	108 kg (clean & jerk)
- Updated on 16 November 2016

Gennady Nikolayevich Shchekalo (Геннадий Николаевич Щекало; born 4 March 1968) is a Belarusian male former weightlifter, who competed in the 108 kg category and represented Belarus at international competitions. He won the bronze medal in the clean & jerk at the 1995 World Weightlifting Championships lifting 220.0 kg. He participated at the 1996 Summer Olympics in the 108 kg event.
