= 1995 World Weightlifting Championships =

World Weightlifting Championships

1995 World Championships
- Host city: Guangzhou, China
- Dates: November 16–26, 1995

The 1995 World Weightlifting Championships were held in Guangzhou, China from November 16 to November 26,

== Medal summary ==
=== Men ===
| Event | Gold | | Silver | | Bronze | |
54 kg
| Snatch | Halil Mutlu; Turkey | 130.0 kg | Zhang Xiangsen; China | 127.5 kg | Lan Shizhang; China | 125.0 kg |
| Clean & Jerk | Zhang Xiangsen; China | 157.5 kg | Halil Mutlu; Turkey | 155.0 kg | Lan Shizhang; China | 147.5 kg |
| Total | Zhang Xiangsen; China | 285.0 kg | Halil Mutlu; Turkey | 285.0 kg | Lan Shizhang; China | 272.5 kg |
59 kg
| Snatch | Leonidas Sabanis; Greece | 137.5 kg | Nikolay Peshalov; Bulgaria | 135.0 kg | William Vargas; Cuba | 135.0 kg |
| Clean & Jerk | Tang Lingsheng; China | 167.5 kg | Li Chuanghuan; China | 167.5 kg | Leonidas Sabanis; Greece | 165.0 kg |
| Total | Leonidas Sabanis; Greece | 302.5 kg | Chun Byung-kwan; South Korea | 300.0 kg | Nikolay Peshalov; Bulgaria | 295.0 kg |
64 kg
| Snatch | Naim Süleymanoğlu; Turkey | 147.5 kg | Valerios Leonidis; Greece | 148.0 kg WR | Wang Guohua; China | 145.0 kg |
| Clean & Jerk | Naim Süleymanoğlu; Turkey | 180.0 kg | Valerios Leonidis; Greece | 180.0 kg | Peng Song; China | 175.0 kg |
| Total | Naim Süleymanoğlu; Turkey | 327.5 kg | Valerios Leonidis; Greece | 327.5 kg | Peng Song; China | 315.0 kg |
70 kg
| Snatch | Fedail Güler; Turkey | 157.5 kg | Zhan Xugang; China | 157.5 kg | Ergün Batmaz; Turkey | 155.0 kg |
| Clean & Jerk | Attila Feri; Hungary | 190.0 kg | Zhan Xugang; China | 190.0 kg | Fedail Güler; Turkey | 187.5 kg |
| Total | Zhan Xugang; China | 347.5 kg | Fedail Güler; Turkey | 345.0 kg | Ergün Batmaz; Turkey | 340.0 kg |
76 kg
| Snatch | Pablo Lara; Cuba | 162.5 kg | Khachatur Kyapanaktsyan; Armenia | 162.5 kg | Yoto Yotov; Bulgaria | 162.5 kg |
| Clean & Jerk | Pablo Lara; Cuba | 205.0 kg | Yoto Yotov; Bulgaria | 202.5 kg | Viktor Mitrou; Greece | 197.5 kg |
| Total | Pablo Lara; Cuba | 367.5 kg | Yoto Yotov; Bulgaria | 365.0 kg | Viktor Mitrou; Greece | 357.5 kg |
83 kg
| Snatch | Marc Huster; Germany | 175.0 kg | Pyrros Dimas; Greece | 172.5 kg | Sergo Chakhoyan; Armenia | 167.5 kg |
| Clean & Jerk | Pyrros Dimas; Greece | 212.5 kg WR | Marc Huster; Germany | 210.0 kg | Dursun Sevinç; Turkey | 207.5 kg |
| Total | Pyrros Dimas; Greece | 385.0 kg | Marc Huster; Germany | 385.0 kg | Vadim Vacarciuc; Moldova | 375.0 kg |
91 kg
| Snatch | Igor Alekseyev; Russia | 180.0 kg | Andrey Makarov; Kazakhstan | 175.0 kg | Aleksander Karapetyan; Armenia | 172.5 kg |
| Clean & Jerk | Igor Alekseyev; Russia | 210.0 kg | Aleksander Karapetyan; Armenia | 210.0 kg | Viktor Belyatsky; Belarus | 207.5 kg |
| Total | Igor Alekseyev; Russia | 390.0 kg | Aleksander Karapetyan; Armenia | 382.5 kg | Andrey Makarov; Kazakhstan | 380.0 kg |
99 kg
| Snatch | Sergey Syrtsov; Russia | 190.0 kg | Anatoly Khrapaty; Kazakhstan | 185.0 kg | Akakios Kakiasvilis; Greece | 182.5 kg |
| Clean & Jerk | Akakios Kakiasvilis; Greece | 227.5 kg | Sergey Syrtsov; Russia | 220.0 kg | Oleg Chiritso; Belarus | 217.5 kg |
| Total | Akakios Kakiasvilis; Greece | 410.0 kg | Sergey Syrtsov; Russia | 410.0 kg | Anatoly Khrapaty; Kazakhstan | 400.0 kg |
108 kg
| Snatch | Cui Wenhua; China | 192.5 kg | Ihor Razoronov; Ukraine | 190.0 kg | Mukhran Gogia; Georgia | 182.5 kg |
| Clean & Jerk | Ihor Razoronov; Ukraine | 227.5 kg | Sergey Flerko; Russia | 222.5 kg | Gennady Shchekalo; Belarus | 220.0 kg |
| Total | Ihor Razoronov; Ukraine | 417.5 kg | Cui Wenhua; China | 407.5 kg | Sergey Flerko; Russia | 405.0 kg |
+108 kg
| Snatch | Ronny Weller; Germany | 197.5 kg | Andrey Chemerkin; Russia | 197.5 kg | Stefan Botev; Australia | 190.0 kg |
| Clean & Jerk | Stefan Botev; Australia | 245.0 kg | Andrey Chemerkin; Russia | 245.0 kg | Ronny Weller; Germany | 242.5 kg |
| Total | Andrey Chemerkin; Russia | 442.5 kg | Ronny Weller; Germany | 440.0 kg | Stefan Botev; Australia | 435.0 kg |

=== Women ===
| Event | Gold | | Silver | | Bronze | |
46 kg
| Snatch | Guan Hong; China | 81.0 kg WR | Kunjarani Devi; India | 75.0 kg | Tsai Huey-woan; Chinese Taipei | 72.5 kg |
| Clean & Jerk | Guan Hong; China | 100.0 kg | Kunjarani Devi; India | 100.0 kg | Tsai Huey-woan; Chinese Taipei | 92.5 kg |
| Total | Guan Hong; China | 180.0 kg | Kunjarani Devi; India | 175.0 kg | Tsai Huey-woan; Chinese Taipei | 165.0 kg |
50 kg
| Snatch | Liu Xiuhua; China | 85.0 kg | Chu Nan-mei; Chinese Taipei | 80.0 kg | Izabela Rifatova; Bulgaria | 75.0 kg |
| Clean & Jerk | Liu Xiuhua; China | 102.5 kg | Chu Nan-mei; Chinese Taipei | 97.5 kg | Izabela Rifatova; Bulgaria | 97.5 kg |
| Total | Liu Xiuhua; China | 187.5 kg | Chu Nan-mei; Chinese Taipei | 177.5 kg | Izabela Rifatova; Bulgaria | 172.5 kg |
54 kg
| Snatch | Karnam Malleswari; India | 90.0 kg | Zhang Xixiang; China | 85.0 kg | Kuo Ping-chun; Chinese Taipei | 80.0 kg |
| Clean & Jerk | Karnam Malleswari; India | 113.0 kg WR | Zhang Xixiang; China | 110.0 kg | Kuo Ping-chun; Chinese Taipei | 105.0 kg |
| Total | Karnam Malleswari; India | 202.5 kg | Zhang Xixiang; China | 195.0 kg | Kuo Ping-chun; Chinese Taipei | 185.0 kg |
59 kg
| Snatch | Chen Xiaomin; China | 92.5 kg | Neelam Setti Laxmi; India | 90.0 kg | Wu Mei-yi; Chinese Taipei | 85.0 kg |
| Clean & Jerk | Chen Xiaomin; China | 123.5 kg WR | Neelam Setti Laxmi; India | 112.5 kg | Wu Mei-yi; Chinese Taipei | 110.0 kg |
| Total | Chen Xiaomin; China | 215.0 kg | Neelam Setti Laxmi; India | 202.5 kg | Wu Mei-yi; Chinese Taipei | 195.0 kg |
64 kg
| Snatch | Chen Jui-lien; Chinese Taipei | 97.5 kg | Erzsébet Márkus; Hungary | 92.5 kg | Gergana Kirilova; Bulgaria | 90.0 kg |
| Clean & Jerk | Chen Jui-lien; Chinese Taipei | 115.0 kg | Gergana Kirilova; Bulgaria | 115.0 kg | Choi Eun-ja; South Korea | 115.0 kg |
| Total | Chen Jui-lien; Chinese Taipei | 212.5 kg | Gergana Kirilova; Bulgaria | 205.0 kg | Maria Christoforidou; Greece | 200.0 kg |
70 kg
| Snatch | Li Hongyun; China | 97.5 kg | Tang Weifang; China | 97.5 kg | Kim Dong-hee; South Korea | 95.0 kg |
| Clean & Jerk | Tang Weifang; China | 129.0 kg WR | Li Hongyun; China | 120.0 kg | Milena Trendafilova; Bulgaria | 120.0 kg |
| Total | Tang Weifang; China | 225.0 kg | Li Hongyun; China | 217.5 kg | Milena Trendafilova; Bulgaria | 215.0 kg |
76 kg
| Snatch | Zhang Xiaoli; China | 102.5 kg | Li Yan; China | 100.0 kg | Mária Takács; Hungary | 97.5 kg |
| Clean & Jerk | Li Yan; China | 127.5 kg | Mária Takács; Hungary | 122.5 kg | Zhang Xiaoli; China | 122.5 kg |
| Total | Li Yan; China | 227.5 kg | Zhang Xiaoli; China | 225.0 kg | Mária Takács; Hungary | 220.0 kg |
83 kg
| Snatch | María Isabel Urrutia; Colombia | 105.0 kg | Chen Shu-chih; Chinese Taipei | 105.0 kg | Panagiota Antonopoulou; Greece | 100.0 kg |
| Clean & Jerk | Chen Shu-chih; Chinese Taipei | 135.0 kg WR | María Isabel Urrutia; Colombia | 132.5 kg | Panagiota Antonopoulou; Greece | 125.0 kg |
| Total | Chen Shu-chih; Chinese Taipei | 240.0 kg | María Isabel Urrutia; Colombia | 237.5 kg | Panagiota Antonopoulou; Greece | 225.0 kg |
+83 kg
| Snatch | Wan Ni; China | 108.0 kg WR | Balkisu Musa; Nigeria | 107.5 kg | Karoliina Lundahl; Finland | 102.5 kg |
| Clean & Jerk | Chen Hsiao-lien; Chinese Taipei | 132.5 kg | Erika Takács; Hungary | 130.0 kg | Karoliina Lundahl; Finland | 125.0 kg |
| Total | Erika Takács; Hungary | 232.5 kg | Chen Hsiao-lien; Chinese Taipei | 230.0 kg | Karoliina Lundahl; Finland | 227.5 kg |

== Medal table ==
Ranking by Big (Total result) medals

| Rank | Nation | Gold | Silver | Bronze | Total |
|---|---|---|---|---|---|
| 1 | China | 7 | 4 | 2 | 13 |
| 2 | Greece | 3 | 1 | 3 | 7 |
| 3 | Chinese Taipei | 2 | 2 | 3 | 7 |
| 4 | Russia | 2 | 1 | 1 | 4 |
| 5 | Turkey | 1 | 2 | 1 | 4 |
| 6 | India | 1 | 2 | 0 | 3 |
| 7 | Hungary | 1 | 0 | 1 | 2 |
| 8 | Cuba | 1 | 0 | 0 | 1 |
| 8 | Ukraine | 1 | 0 | 0 | 1 |
| 10 | Bulgaria | 0 | 2 | 3 | 5 |
| 11 | Germany | 0 | 2 | 0 | 2 |
| 12 | Armenia | 0 | 1 | 0 | 1 |
| 12 | Colombia | 0 | 1 | 0 | 1 |
| 12 | South Korea | 0 | 1 | 0 | 1 |
| 15 | Kazakhstan | 0 | 0 | 2 | 2 |
| 16 | Australia | 0 | 0 | 1 | 1 |
| 16 | Finland | 0 | 0 | 1 | 1 |
| 16 | Moldova | 0 | 0 | 1 | 1 |
| Totals (18 entries) | | 19 | 19 | 19 | 57 |

Ranking by all medals: Big (Total result) and Small (Snatch and Clean & Jerk)

| Rank | Nation | Gold | Silver | Bronze | Total |
|---|---|---|---|---|---|
| 1 | China | 21 | 13 | 7 | 41 |
| 2 | Chinese Taipei | 6 | 5 | 9 | 20 |
| 3 | Greece | 6 | 4 | 8 | 18 |
| 4 | Russia | 5 | 5 | 1 | 11 |
| 5 | Turkey | 5 | 3 | 4 | 12 |
| 6 | India | 3 | 6 | 0 | 9 |
| 7 | Cuba | 3 | 0 | 1 | 4 |
| 8 | Hungary | 2 | 3 | 2 | 7 |
| 9 | Germany | 2 | 3 | 1 | 6 |
| 10 | Ukraine | 2 | 1 | 0 | 3 |
| 11 | Colombia | 1 | 2 | 0 | 3 |
| 12 | Australia | 1 | 0 | 2 | 3 |
| 13 | Bulgaria | 0 | 5 | 8 | 13 |
| 14 | Armenia | 0 | 3 | 2 | 5 |
| 15 | Kazakhstan | 0 | 2 | 2 | 4 |
| 16 | South Korea | 0 | 1 | 2 | 3 |
| 17 | Nigeria | 0 | 1 | 0 | 1 |
| 18 | Belarus | 0 | 0 | 3 | 3 |
| 18 | Finland | 0 | 0 | 3 | 3 |
| 20 | Georgia | 0 | 0 | 1 | 1 |
| 20 | Moldova | 0 | 0 | 1 | 1 |
| Totals (21 entries) | | 57 | 57 | 57 | 171 |
