= Weightlifting at the 1988 Summer Olympics – Men's 75 kg =

Weightlifting at the Olympics

Men's 75 kg at the Games of the XXIV Olympiad
- Venue: Olympic Weightlifting Gymnasium
- Date: 22 September 1988
- Competitors: 25 from 20 nations
- Winning total: 375.0 kg OR

Medalists
1st place, gold medalist(s)		Borislav Gidikov	Bulgaria
2nd place, silver medalist(s)		Ingo Steinhöfel	East Germany
3rd place, bronze medalist(s)		Aleksandar Varbanov	Bulgaria

The men's 75 kg weightlifting competitions at the 1988 Summer Olympics in Seoul took place on 22 September at the Olympic Weightlifting Gymnasium. It was the sixteenth appearance of the middleweight class.

== Results ==
Rank	Name	Country	kg
1	Borislav Gidikov	Bulgaria	375.0
2	Ingo Steinhöfel	East Germany	360.0
3	Aleksandar Varbanov	Bulgaria	357.5
4	Cai Yanshu	China	347.5
5	Andrei Socaci	Romania	347.5
6	Waldemar Kosiński	Poland	332.5
7	Dean Willey	Great Britain	332.5
8	Tony Urrutia	United States	327.5
9	Angelo Mannironi	Italy	325.0
10	I Nyoman Sudarma	Indonesia	320.0
11	Ricki Chaplin	Great Britain	320.0
12	Jaarli Pirkkiö	Finland	317.5
13	Khalil El-Sayed	Egypt	315.0
14	Mats Lindqvist	Sweden	315.0
15	Şahin Menge	Turkey	312.5
16	Kim Byeong-chan	South Korea	310.0
17	Ron Laycock	Australia	310.0
18	Pietro Pujia	Italy	310.0
19	Paul Harrison	Australia	307.5
20	Roger Token	Papua New Guinea	255.0
21	Paul Hoffman	Swaziland	197.5
22	Benjamin Fafale	Solomon Islands	190.0
AC	David Maina	Kenya	105.0
AC	Ma Wenzhu	China	150.0
AC	Kálmán Csengeri	Hungary	350.0 (DQ)
