= Maria Christoforidou =

Greek weightlifter (born 1964)

Personal information
- Native name: Μαρία Χριστοφορίδου
- Born: 19 August 1964 (age 62) Ioannina, Greece
- Height: 1.6 m (5.2 ft)

Sport
- Country: Greece
- Sport: Weightlifting
- Retired: 1999

Maria Christoforidou (Greek: Μαρία Χριστοφορίδου, born 19 August 1964) is a retired Greek weightlifter. She won 46 medals in international competitions, notably winning gold at the 1990 World Weightlifting Championships.

Initially a judo athlete, she began weightlifting competitively in the 1980s. She participated in the lightweight and middleweight categories through the late 1980s and 1990s until she retired in 1999.

== Major results ==
Year	Venue	Weight class	Snatch		Clean & Jerk		Total	Rank
Year	Venue	Weight class	Weight (kg)	Rank	Weight (kg)	Rank	Total	Rank
World Championships
1988	Jakarta, Indonesia	60 kg	80	2nd place, silver medalist(s)	97.5	3rd place, bronze medalist(s)	177.5	2nd place, silver medalist(s)
1989	Manchester, United Kingdom	60 kg	-	-	100	3rd place, bronze medalist(s)	100	-
1990	(Socialist Federal Republic of Yugoslavia) Sarajevo, Yugoslavia	60 kg	87.5	1st place, gold medalist(s)	110	1st place, gold medalist(s)	197.5	1st place, gold medalist(s)
1992	Varna, Bulgaria	60 kg	90	2nd place, silver medalist(s)	105	3rd place, bronze medalist(s)	195	2nd place, silver medalist(s)
1993	Melbourne, Australia	59 kg	90	3rd place, bronze medalist(s)	107.5	3rd place, bronze medalist(s)	197.5	3rd place, bronze medalist(s)
1995	Guangzhou, China	64 kg	87.5	4	112.5	4	200	3rd place, bronze medalist(s)
1996	Warsaw, Poland	59 kg	90	2nd place, silver medalist(s)	107.5	3rd place, bronze medalist(s)	197.5	2nd place, silver medalist(s)
1998	Lahti, Finland	58 kg	85	6	105	5	190	5
European Championships
1988	City of San Marino, San Marino	60 kg	72.5	2nd place, silver medalist(s)	90	2nd place, silver medalist(s)	162.5	(gold)
1989	Manchester, United Kingdom	60 kg	-	-	100	3rd place, bronze medalist(s)	100	-
1990	Santa Cruz de Tenerife, Spain	60 kg	82.5	1st place, gold medalist(s)	102.5	1st place, gold medalist(s)	185	1st place, gold medalist(s)
1991	Varna, Bulgaria	60 kg	87.5	1st place, gold medalist(s)	110	1st place, gold medalist(s)	197.5	1st place, gold medalist(s)
1992	Loures, Portugal	60 kg	82.5	2nd place, silver medalist(s)	107.5	1st place, gold medalist(s)	190	2nd place, silver medalist(s)
1993	Valencia, Spain	64 kg	85	2nd place, silver medalist(s)	107.5	1st place, gold medalist(s)	192.5	1st place, gold medalist(s)
1995	(Palestine) Beersheba, Israel	59 kg	90	1st place, gold medalist(s)	110	1st place, gold medalist(s)	200	1st place, gold medalist(s)
1996	(Czech Republic) Prague, Czechia	59 kg	82.5	3rd place, bronze medalist(s)	100	2nd place, silver medalist(s)	182.5	2nd place, silver medalist(s)
1997	Sevilla, Spain	59 kg	82.5	5	105	2nd place, silver medalist(s)	187.5	(silver)
1998	Riesa, Germany	58 kg	80	4	102.5	3rd place, bronze medalist(s)	182.5	3rd place, bronze medalist(s)

== See also ==
- List of World Championships medalists in weightlifting (women)
- Ioanna Chatziioannou
