= Şahin Menge =

Turkish weightlifter

Personal information
- Nationality: Turkish
- Born: 2 July 1965 (age 59)

Sport
- Sport: Weightlifting

Şahin Menge (born 2 July 1965) is a Turkish weightlifter. He competed in the men's middleweight event at the 1988 Summer Olympics.
