= Jaarli Pirkkiö =

Finnish weightlifter

Personal information
- Nationality: Finnish
- Born: 12 February 1967 (age 59) Rovaniemi, Finland

Sport
- Sport: Weightlifting

Achievements and titles
- Olympic finals: 1988 Summer Olympics

Jaarli Pirkkiö (born 12 February 1967) is a Finnish weightlifter. He competed in the men's middleweight event at the 1988 Summer Olympics.
