= Go Gwang-gu =

South Korean weightlifter (born 1972)

Personal information
- Nationality: South Korean
- Born: 29 September 1972 (age 52)

Sport
- Sport: Weightlifting

Go Gwang-gu (born 29 September 1972) is a South Korean weightlifter. He competed at the 1992 Summer Olympics and the 1996 Summer Olympics.
