= Ma Wenzhu =

Chinese weightlifter

Personal information
- Nationality: Chinese
- Born: 11 August 1963 (age 62)

Sport
- Sport: Weightlifting

Ma Wenzhu (simplified Chinese: 马文柱; traditional Chinese: 馬文柱; pinyin: Mǎ Wénzhù, born 11 August 1963) is a Chinese weightlifter. He competed in the men's middleweight event at the 1988 Summer Olympics. He is from Qingdao.
