= Julie Malenfant =

Canadian Olympics weightlifter (1973–2020)

- Born: Julie Tracy Malenfant; June 16, 1973; Penetanguishene, Ontario, Canada
- Died: January 15, 2020 (aged 46); St. Simons Island, Georgia, US
- Height: 5 ft 8 in (1.73 m)
- Weight: 135 lb (61 kg; 9.6 st)
- Division: Bantamweight
- Reach: 67.0 in (170 cm)
- Stance: Orthodox

Mixed martial arts record
- Total: 2
- Wins: 0
- Losses: 2
- By knockout: 1
- By submission: 1

Other information
- Notable school: Villa Française des Jeunes
- Mixed martial arts record from Sherdog

Julie Tracy Malenfant Northrup (June 16, 1973 – January 15, 2020) was a Canadian mixed martial artist and weightlifter. She won a Bronze medal in the 1993 World Weightlifting Championships and participated in the 1997 World Weightlifting Championships, 1999 World Weightlifting Championships and Weightlifting at the 1999 Pan American Games. She was also on Canada’s 2002 Olympic bobsled team.

== Mixed martial arts record ==
Professional record breakdown
2 matches	0 wins	2 losses
By knockout	0	1
By submission	0	1
By decision	0	0
No contests	0	

Res.	Record	Opponent	Method	Event	Date	Round	Time	Location	Notes
Loss	0–2	Sara McMann	Submission (punches)	BlackEye Promotions 4	June 17, 2011	1	0:32	Fletcher, North Carolina, United States	
Loss	0–1	Valérie Létourneau	TKO (punches)	Ringside MMA 10: Cote vs. Starnes	April 9, 2011	2	2:15	Montreal, Quebec, Canada	
