= Angelo Mannironi =

Italian weightlifter

Personal information
- Nationality: Italian
- Born: 9 August 1961 (age 63); Rome, Italy

Sport
- Sport: Weightlifting

Angelo Mannironi (born 9 August 1961) is an Italian weightlifter. He competed in the men's middleweight event at the 1988 Summer Olympics.
