= Milena Trendafilova =

Bulgarian weightlifter (born 1970)

Personal information
- Full name: Milena Grigorova Trendafilova
- Born: 3 May 1970 (age 56) Varna, Bulgaria
- Height: 166 cm (5 ft 5 in)
- Weight: 68.90 kg (151.9 lb)

Sport
- Country: Bulgaria
- Sport: Weightlifting
- Weight class: 69 kg
- Club: FC Spartak Varna; FC Chernomorets Burgas
- Team: National team
Medal record
World Championships
Silver medal – second place	Jakarta 1988	75 kg
Gold medal – first place	Manchester 1989	75 kg
Gold medal – first place	Sarajevo 1990	75 kg
Silver medal – second place	Donaueschingen 1991	75 kg
Silver medal – second place	Varna 1992	67.5 kg
Gold medal – first place	Melbourne 1993	70 kg
Bronze medal – third place	Guangzhou 1995	70 kg
Silver medal – second place	Athens 1999	69 kg
- Updated on 13 September 2016

Milena Grigorova Trendafilova (Милена Григорова Трендафилова, born 3 May 1970 in Varna) is a Bulgarian weightlifter, competing in the 69 kg category and representing Bulgaria at international competitions.

She participated at the 2000 Summer Olympics in the 69 kg event and also at the 2004 Summer Olympics in the 69 kg event. She competed at world championships, most recently at the 2003 World Weightlifting Championships.

== Major results ==
Year	Venue	Weight	Snatch (kg)				Clean & jerk (kg)				Total	Rank
Year	Venue	Weight	1	2	3	Rank	1	2	3	Rank	Total	Rank
Summer Olympics
2004	Athens, Greece	69 kg				—N/a				—N/a		6
2000	Sydney, Australia	69 kg				—N/a				—N/a		4
World Championships
2003	Vancouver, Canada	69 kg	102.5	~~107.5~~	107.5	8	132.5	~~137.5~~	~~137.5~~	7	240	8
1999	Piraeus, Greece	69 kg	100	~~105~~	105	2nd place, silver medalist(s)	127.5	~~130~~	~~130~~	3rd place, bronze medalist(s)	232.5	2nd place, silver medalist(s)
