= Carla Garrett =

American athlete (born 1967)

Personal information
- Full name: Carla Sue Garrett
- Born: July 31, 1967 (age 59) Albuquerque, New Mexico, U.S.

Sport
- Country: United States
- Sport: Weightlifting; Athletics (discus throwing)
- Weight class: +83 kg
- Club: Nike Coast
- Team: National team

Achievements and titles
- Personal best: DT – 60.54 (1992).
Medal record
Women's weightlifting
Representing United States
World Championships
Silver medal – second place	1991 Donaueschingen	+82.5 kg
Silver medal – second place	1993 Melbourne	+83 kg
- Updated on October 6, 2016

Carla Sue Garrett (born July 31, 1967, in Albuquerque, New Mexico) is a former American female weightlifter and discus thrower representing the United States in both sports at international competitions.

== Life ==
Garrett attended the University of Arizona.

After her career she became the strength and conditioning coach for the football team at Salpointe Catholic High School in Tucson. She has been at Salpointe since 2006.

== Weightlifting ==
She competed in the super heavyweight class. She won the silver medal at the 1991 and 1993 World Weightlifting Championships.

== Discus throwing ==
Garett participated at the 1992 Summer Olympics in the discus throw event. Garrett didn't make it out of her group in the qualifying heats, finishing 13th out of 14 with a throw of 58.06 meters. She also competed at the 1991 and 1993 World Championships in Athletics. Her personal best is 60.54 metre, set in 1992.
