= Izabela Dragneva =

Bulgarian weightlifter (born 1971)

Personal information
- Born: October 1, 1971 (age 54) Varna, Bulgaria
Medal record
Women's Weightlifting
Representing Bulgaria
Summer Olympic Games
Disqualified	2000 Sydney	– 48kg
World Championships
Gold medal – first place	1991 Donaueschingen	– 48 kg
Silver medal – second place	1992 Varna	– 48 kg
Silver medal – second place	1994 Istanbul	– 50 kg
Bronze medal – third place	1995 Guangzhou	– 50 kg
Silver medal – second place	1997 Chiang Mai	– 50 kg
Silver medal – second place	1998 Lahti	– 53 kg
Bronze medal – third place	2002 Warsaw	– 48 kg
European Championships
Gold medal – first place	1991 Varna	– 48 kg
Gold medal – first place	1994 Rome	– 50 kg
Gold medal – first place	1996 Prague	– 50 kg
Silver medal – second place	1997 Sevilla	– 50 kg
Gold medal – first place	1998 Riesa	– 53 kg
Gold medal – first place	1999 La Coruña	– 53 kg
Gold medal – first place	2000 Sofia	– 53 kg
Silver medal – second place	2003 Loutraki	– 53 kg
Gold medal – first place	2004 Kyiv	– 48 kg

Izabela Dragneva-Rifatova (Bulgarian: Изабела Драгнева-Рифатова; born October 1, 1971, in Varna) is a retired weightlifter from Bulgaria, who is best known for being the first female weightlifter to be stripped of her medal and results and disqualified from an Olympic games for cheating. She twice competed for her native country at the Summer Olympics: 2000 (the first year women's weightlifting was contested as an Olympic sport) and 2004. She won the silver medal in the women's – 53 kg division at the 1998 World Weightlifting Championships in Lahti.

Dragneva competed in the 48 kg category at the 2000 Summer Olympics where she originally won the gold medal. She was stripped of her gold medal three days later after she tested positive for the banned diuretic furosemide.

Also, because multiple Bulgarian weightlifters tested positive in previous Olympic competitions, the entire Bulgarian weightlifting team was disqualified and sent home from the Games. The IWF cited their 'Three Strikes' rule for the disassociation.

Dragneva's disqualification meant that American Tara Nott was awarded the gold medal in the 48 kg class.

== See also ==
- List of sportspeople sanctioned for doping offences
- List of stripped Olympic medals
