= Sibby Flowers =

American weightlifter (born 1963)

Sibby Flowers (born 1963) is a former Olympic style weightlifter for the United States. Her coach was John Coffee. She competed at the 44 kg then the 46 kg (after the weight classes were restructured) weight classes and holds the American records for the snatch (67.5 kg), clean & jerk (85 kg), and total (147.5 kg). The weight classes were restructured again when women were added to the Olympic program, thus Sibby holds all of her records in perpetuity.

== Weightlifting achievements ==
- U.S. Olympic Festival: 1989 1st, 1990 1st, 1991 1st, 1993 1st, 1994 Bombed out, 1995 Bombed out
- National Championships: 1984 2nd, 1985 2nd, 1987 1st (Best Lifter), 1988 1st, 1989 1st, 1990 1st (Best Lifter), 1991 2nd, 1992 1st (Best Lifter), 1993 1st, 1994 1st, 1995 1st, 1996 1st
- NACACI: 1994 2nd (Colorado Springs), 1995 1st (Toronto), 1996 1st (Shreveport)
- Pannonia Cup: 1988 1st (Budapest, Hungary)
- World Championships: 1987 3rd (Daytona, USA), 1986 6th (Manchester, England), 1990 4th (Sarajevo, Yugoslavia), 1991 3rd (Donaueschingen, Germany), 1992 3rd (Varna, Bulgaria), 1993 5th (Melbourne, Australia), 1994 7th (Istanbul, Turkey), 1995 7th (Guangzhou, China)
- Weightlifting Hall of Fame: Inducted in 2001
- N.O.W. honoree 1988
- Carroll County Athlete of the Year 1989
- United States Olympic Committee Athlete of the Year 1990
- Georgia Women's Intersport Network Sportswoman of the Year Finalist 1995

== Personal life ==
Her maiden name was Sibby Harris. Has a son Christopher born in 1989, and a son Alex born in 1999. Now resides in Knoxville, Tennessee.
