= Liu Xiuhua =

Chinese weightlifter (born 1975)

Medal record

Women's weightlifting

Representing China

World Championships
Gold medal – first place	1992 Varna	–48 kg
Gold medal – first place	1993 Melbourne	–50 kg
Gold medal – first place	1995 Guangzhou	–50 kg
Gold medal – first place	1996 Warszawa	–50 kg

Asian Games
Gold medal – first place	1994 Hiroshima	–50 kg
Gold medal – first place	1998 Bangkok	–48 kg

National Games of China
Gold medal – first place	1993 Beijing	–50 kg
Bronze medal – third place	1997 Shanghai	–50 kg
Bronze medal – third place	2001 Guangdong	–48 kg

Liu Xiuhua (simplified Chinese: 刘秀华; traditional Chinese: 劉秀華; born 5 October 1975 in Zengcheng, Guangdong) is a Chinese weightlifter. During the 1990s she was several times World and Asian Games champion.
