= Robin Goad =

American weightlifter (born 1970)

Personal information
- Born: January 17, 1970 (age 56)
Medal record
Women's Weightlifting
Representing the United States
World Championships
Silver medal – second place	1987 Daytona Beach	– 48 kg
Silver medal – second place	1988 Jakarta	– 48 kg
Silver medal – second place	1991 Donaueschingen	– 52 kg
Bronze medal – third place	1992 Varna	– 52 kg
Silver medal – second place	1993 Melbourne	– 54 kg
Gold medal – first place	1994 Istanbul	– 50 kg
Bronze medal – third place	1998 Lahti	– 53 kg
Pan American Games
Gold medal – first place	1999 Winnipeg	– 53 kg

Robin Elizabeth Goad (born January 17, 1970, in Newnan, Georgia), also known as Robin Byrd-Goad, is a retired female Olympic weightlifter from the United States, who competed at the 2000 Summer Olympics. She won the bronze medal in the women's – 53 kg division at the 1998 World Weightlifting Championships in Lahti. Goad competed in the first Women's World Championships in 1987 at age seventeen and was the only female Olympian to compete in the 2000 Olympics who was also present at that first women's Worlds. She currently teaches Physical Education at an elementary school.

== Weightlifting achievements ==
- Junior and Senior American record holder in snatch, clean and jerk, and total (1986–1992)
- Senior National Champion (1988, 1989, 1991–1996, 1999, & 2001)
- Senior American record holder in snatch, clean and jerk, and total (1993–1997)
- Senior World Champion (1994)
- Pan Am Games Champion (1999)
- Olympic Games team member (2000)
- Set one Senior World record during career
- All-Time Junior and Senior American record holder in snatch and total
