= Zhang Xixiang =

Chinese weightlifter (born 1978)

Zhang Xixiang (张惜香; born 27 May 1978) is a Chinese weightlifter.

She competed at the 1995 World Weightlifting Championships winning a silver medal, and 1996 World Weightlifting Championships, winning a gold medal.
