= Karyn Marshall =

American weightlifter (born 1956)

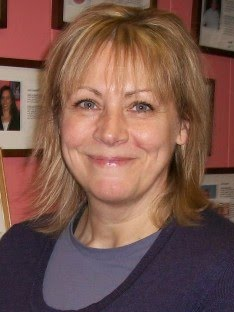
- Marshall in 2011
- Born: April 2, 1956 (age 70); Miami, Florida, U.S.
- Education: Columbia University; Northeast College of Health Sciences
- Occupation: Chiropractor at Champion Chiropractic
- Years active: 1990–present
- Height: 5 ft 10 in (178 cm)
- Website: championchiro.com

Karyn Marshall
Medal record

Women's Weightlifting

World Championship
Gold medal – first place	World competition 1987	+75 kg
Silver medal – second place	Jakarta (INA) 1988	+75 kg
Silver medal – second place	Manchester (GBR) 1989	+75 kg
Silver medal – second place	Sarajevo (YUG) 1990	+75 kg

National Championship
Gold medal – first place	Los Angeles (USA) 1989	+82.5 kg
Gold medal – first place	Oklahoma City (USA) 1989	Women's heavyweight
Gold medal – first place	Empire State Games (USA) 1999	+82.5 kg

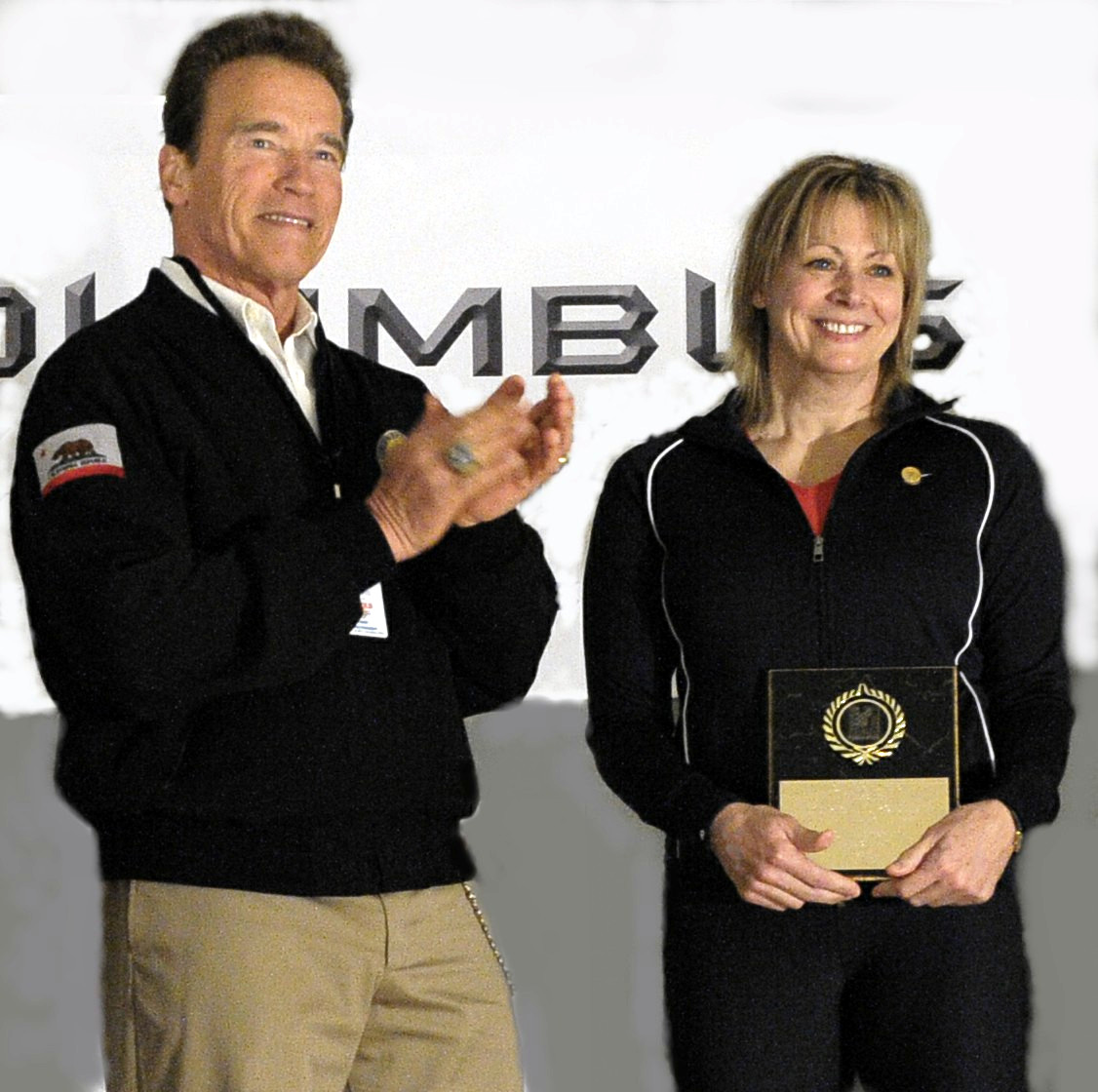
Marshall was inducted into the USA Weightlifting Hall of Fame in Columbus, Ohio in March 2011. Arnold Schwarzenegger (left) presented the award.

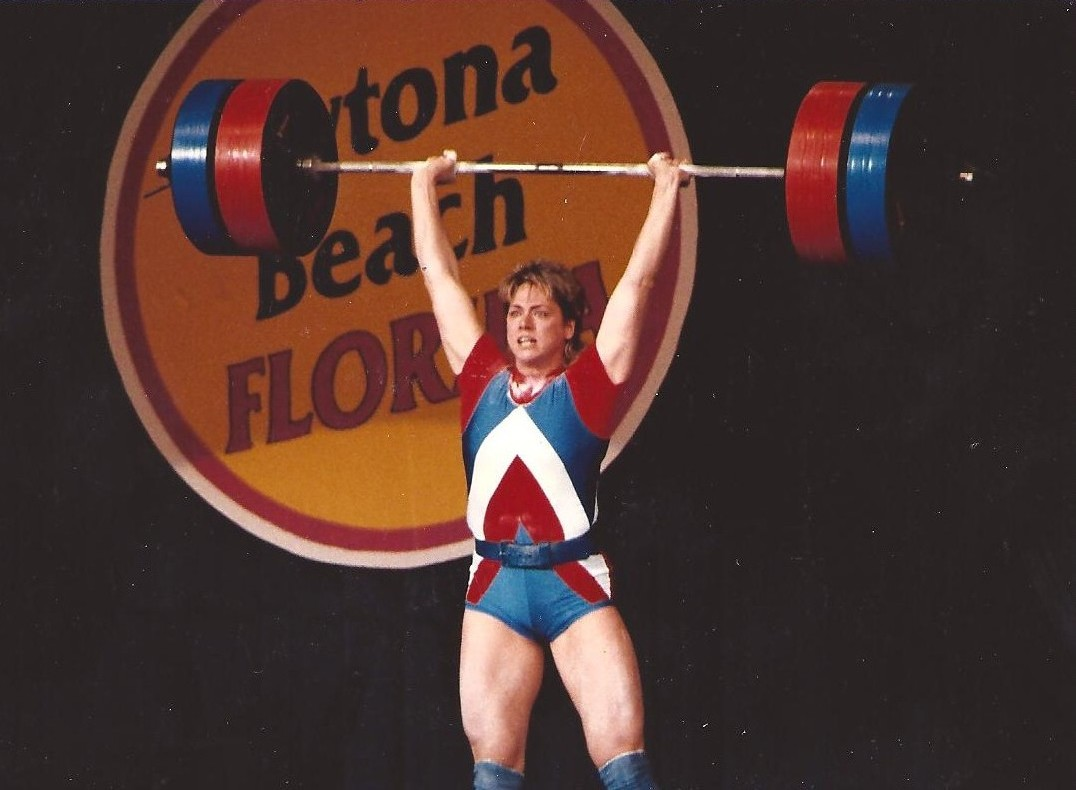
Marshall lifting barbells at the 1987 world weightlifting competition in Daytona Beach, Florida.

Karyn Marshall (born April 2, 1956, in Miami, Florida) is an American Olympic weightlifter who won the first women's world championship in weightlifting, held in 1987. She also set 60 American and world records in women's weightlifting and in 1985 became the first woman in history to clean and jerk over 300 lb (136 kg), which she did with a lift of 303 pounds (137 kg). She became a chiropractor and runs a private practice in Shrewsbury, New Jersey while battling breast cancer since 2011. In 2011, Marshall was inducted into the USA Weightlifting Hall of Fame, and she was inducted into the International Weightlifting Hall of Fame in 2015.

== Early years ==
Marshall was born in a Miami hospital in 1956 and grew up in Coral Gables, Florida. Her family moved to Bronxville, New York in the 1960s. She attended Bronxville High School and excelled in field hockey (she was goalie) and basketball (center), graduating in 1974, and she also competed in tennis and track. She earned a Bachelor of Science in nursing degree from Columbia University in 1980 and was a Dean's List student. She worked as a nurse for six months but changed her mind saying there "were a lot of frustrations." She worked as a financial analyst at the Wall Street brokerage firm of P. R. Herzig and Company for ten years.

== Career ==
Marshall began training in 1978. She was coached by talented weightlifters such as Arthur Drechsler and Mark Chasnov. Generally in the 1970s there were no local, national or international competitions for women weightlifters, and women's weightlifting was not seen so much as a legitimate sport but more as a "freak show". She commented in Sports Illustrated in 1987 that "people think women weightlifters are squat and muscle-bound, with all the intelligence of amoebas".

But in the 1980s and in subsequent decades, women's athletics were becoming more prominent. Marshall's first competition was the qualifying meet for the 1979 Empire State Games in White Plains, New York. She won her first national championship in 1981. During the 1980s, Marshall won her weight class six times out of seven and set 45 national records. In 1983, Marshall learned from men's coach Mark LeMenager that the women's weightlifting record had been set 75 years earlier when circus performer Katie Sandwina lifted 130-kilogram (290 lb) overhead; according to Drechsler, the Sandwina record inspired Marshall to work harder. Her training regimen included "more squatting, pressing and other strength building exercises." In 1984, she made it into the Guinness Sports Record Book with a 289-pound (131 kg) clean and jerk, an Olympic event featuring a two-stage lift of a barbell above one's head. This lift topped the Sandwina record. In 1984, she was recognized as the world record holder for women's weightlifting in the 82.5 kg category, based on her results from a competition in Florida. In 1985, Marshall lifted 303 pounds (137 kg) in the clean-and-jerk lift. In 1987, the first year in which there was a world championship for women in weightlifting, Marshall competed for the United States against a surprisingly strong team from China. She not only won her bodyweight category by 12.5 kilograms (28 lb) but she outlifted all athletes in the unlimited bodyweight category. She made the highest total in the competition to earn the title of World's Strongest Woman. The Guinness Sports Record Book credited her as being the "world's most powerful female" because of her lifting 303 pounds (137 kg) overhead. She won the International Weightlifting Federation (IWF) World Championship. She was described as the "top American finisher" in the 181.75 pounds (82.44 kg) pound weight class. She said:

The most exciting moment was being the last American to lift at the 1987 Women's World Championship. The Chinese had dominated the competition, winning each of the other weight classes, and I was the last American hope. Lifting the most weight of the competition and winning three gold medals for myself, my team and my country was a most intense feeling.

She married Peter Marshall in 1987. In 1988, she was listed in the New York Times roster of champions for women's weightlifting in the 82.5 kilograms (182 lb) category. In 1989, she won the women's heavyweight division by lifting a total of 507 pounds (230 kg). She won silver medals in international competitions—Jakarta (1988), Manchester (1989) and Sarajevo (1990). In 1989, Marshall won the women's heavyweight division lifting a total of 507 pounds (230 kg). She was viewed by officials of women's weightlifting as a representative for the sport, and Mary Ann Rinehart described her as a "fantastic spokesperson" who "represents the true meaning of the amateur athlete." In 1999, Marshall won a gold medal in the open division middle heavyweight division (+75 kg or +165¼ pounds). She is an eight‑time United States Weightlifting Federation (USWF) champion and New York State record holder for the United States Powerlifting Federation (USPF). She is the first woman in history to snatch over 200 pounds. A snatch is the other Olympic event in which a barbell is raised from a platform to locked arms overhead in a smooth continuous movement, pulled as high as possible, typically to mid chest height. Marshall holds the IWF World Record for the snatch lift at 248 lb (112 kg).

In 1991, in a send-off of the United States team to the Olympics, Marshall set "Festival records for the snatch (198 1/4), clean and jerk (264 1/2) and total (462 3/4) at 181 3/4 pounds." By 1991, she had won a total of one world championship (1987), 63 American records, and 8 world records. She appeared on The Oprah Winfrey Show, the Joan Rivers Show, ESPN, CNN, and various other prime time news and sports broadcasts. In 2011, she became a coach at CrossFit in Shrewsbury, New Jersey.

Marshall began studying to be a chiropractor at Northeast College of Health Sciences based on her successful experiences as a patient. She attributed much of her success in weightlifting to chiropractic because it steered her away from painkillers and towards drug-free and non-surgical forms of treatment and prevention, she said in an interview. She explained her decision to become a chiropractor allowed her to "stay involved in health and fitness, while at the same time being able to use my knowledge and experience to help other people."

During these years, Marshall continued to compete in weightlifting events; in 2006, competing at age 50, she set three records in the women's 50–54 category. The first two records came in the snatch and clean and jerk events, and her total of 143 kilograms (315 lb) set a record. She also was described as having bench-pressed 238 pounds (108 kg), and made a "475 pound [215 kg] dead lift".
