= Karoliina Lundahl =

Finnish weightlifter (born 1968)

Personal information
- Born: 30 June 1968 (age 57)
Medal record
Women's Weightlifting
Representing Finland
World Championships
Gold medal – first place	1994 Istanbul	+83 kg
Gold medal – first place	1998 Lahti	– 75 kg
Silver medal – second place	1996 Warsaw	+83 kg
Bronze medal – third place	1995 Guangzhou	+83 kg
European Championships
Bronze medal – third place	1999 La Coruña	– 75 kg
Bronze medal – third place	2001 Trencin	– 75 kg

Satu Karoliina Lundahl, née Leppäluoto (born 30 June 1968 in Helsinki) is a retired female weightlifter from Finland, who was nicknamed "Kartsi" during her career. She started as a shot putter, competing for her native country at the 1996 Summer Olympics.

Lundahl won the Finnish championships in 1994, 1996 and 1998.

Lundahl later started a career in weightlifting, winning the gold medal at the 1998 World Weightlifting Championships in Lahti. She also competed in this discipline at the 2000 Summer Olympics in Sydney, Australia.
