= Karnam Malleswari =

Indian weightlifter (born 1975)

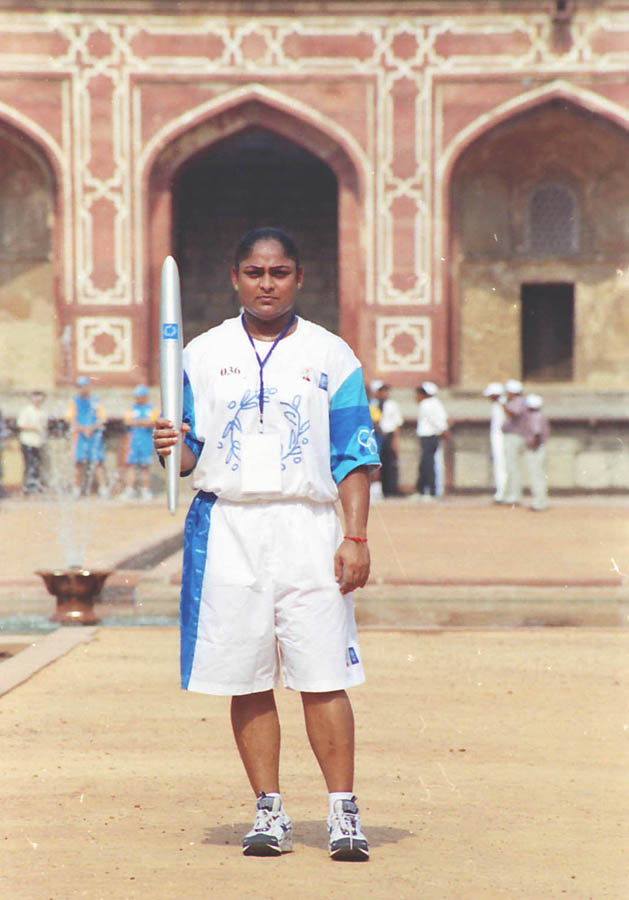

Personal information
- Born: 1 June 1975 (age 51) Voosavanipeta, Srikakulam district, Andhra Pradesh, India
- Height: 163 cm (5 ft 4 in)

Sport
- Country: India
- Sport: Weightlifting
- Coached by: Leonid Taranenko
Medal record
Representing India
Olympic Games
Bronze medal – third place	2000 Sydney	69 kg
World Championships
Gold medal – first place	1994 Istanbul	54 kg
Gold medal – first place	1995 Guangzhou	54 kg
Bronze medal – third place	1993 Melbourne	54 kg
Bronze medal – third place	1996 Guangzhou	54 kg
Asian Games
Silver medal – second place	1994 Hiroshima	54 kg
Silver medal – second place	1998 Bangkok	63 kg

Karnam Malleswari (born 1 June 1975) is a retired Indian weightlifter, currently serving as the Vice-Chancellor of Delhi Sports University, since 2021. She became the first Indian woman to win a medal at the Olympics in 2000, and was India's only medal in the 2000 Olympics. In 1994, she received the Arjuna Award and in 1999, she received the Khel Ratna award, India's highest sporting honour, and the civilian Padma Shri award.

== Career ==
Malleswari won the world title in the 54 kg division in 1994 and 1995 and placed third in 1993 and 1996.

In 1994, she won silver at the World Championships in Istanbul and in 1995 she won the Asian Weightlifting Championships in Korea in the 54 kg category. That year, she won the title in China with a record lift of 113 kg at the World Championships. Even before her Olympic win, Malleswari was a two-time weightlifting world champion with 29 international medals, which includes 11 gold medals.

Along with the national and international medals, Malleswari was also awarded with Arjuna Award in 1994, the Rajiv Gandhi Khel Ratna in 1999, and Padma Shri in 1999.

At the 2000 Sydney Olympics, Malleswari lifted 110 kg in the "snatch" and 130 kg in the "clean and jerk" categories for a total of 240 kg. She won the bronze medal and became the first Indian woman to win an Olympic medal. She is also the first Indian weightlifter, male or female, to win an Olympic medal. Her medal was the only medal that India secured in the 2000 Olympics.

In June 2021, she was appointed as the 1st vice-chancellor of Delhi Sports University.

== Personal life ==
Malleswari was born in a Telugu Brahmin family in Srikakulam. She has four sisters and all are married and well settled in life.

Malleshwari started her career when she was 12 and was trained under coach Neelamshetty Appanna. Her sister was married and living in Delhi, and Malleshwari moved to that city for better training when it became clear that she had the potential to become a great athlete. Her talent was soon spotted by the Sports Authority of India. In 1990, Malleshwari joined the national camp and four years later, she became the weight-lifting world championship winner in the 54-kg class.

In 1997, Malleshwari married fellow weightlifter Rajesh Tyagi. In 2001, one year after winning the Olympic bronze medal in her sport, she became a mother with the birth of a son. She planned to return to competitions at the 2002 Commonwealth Games, but withdrew due to her father's death. She retired after failing to score at the 2004 Olympics. Karnam Malleshwari and Tyagi currently live in Yamunanagar, Haryana, with their son and in-laws in a joint family. She works at the Food Corporation of India as Chief General Manager (General Administration).

== Awards ==
She is honoured with the Arjuna award in 1994. She is honoured with the Padmashri Award in 1999
