= Li Yajuan =

Chinese weightlifter (born 1971)

Medal record

Women's weightlifting

Representing China

World Championships
Gold medal – first place	1990 Sarajevo	+82.5 kg
Gold medal – first place	1991 Donaueschingen	+82.5 kg
Gold medal – first place	1992 Varna	+82.5 kg
Gold medal – first place	1993 Melbourne	+83 kg

Asian Games
Gold medal – first place	1994 Hiroshima	+83 kg

Li Yajuan (Chinese: 李亚娟; born 23 July 1971 in Shuangliao, Jilin) is a Chinese weightlifter who was active in the late 1980s and early 1990s, winning four World Championships in a row.
