= Yuriko Takahashi =

Japanese weightlifter (born 1973)

Personal information
- Full name: Yuriko Takahashi
- Born: 28 July 1973 (age 52) Niigata, Japan
- Height: 157 cm (5 ft 2 in)
- Weight: 58 kg (128 lb)

Sport
- Country: Japan
- Sport: Weightlifting
- Weight class: 58 kg
- Team: National team
- Updated on 28 September 2016

Yuriko Takahashi (高橋 百合子, Takahashi Yuriko; born 28 July 1973 in Niigata) is a Japanese female weightlifter, competing in the 58 kg category and representing Japan at international competitions.

She participated at the 2000 Summer Olympics in the 58 kg event but did not mark.
