= Arlys Johnson-Maxwell =

American weightlifter

Arlys Johnson-Maxwell (born October 12, 1961) is a former weightlifter for the United States.

== Weightlifting achievements ==
- Senior World Champion (1987)
- Seven-time Senior World Championships team member
- Senior National Champion (1986–1989, 1992–1994)
- Senior American record holder in snatch, clean and jerk, and total (1972–1992)
