= Li Yan (weightlifter) =

Chinese weightlifter (born 2004)

Personal information
- Born: September 1, 2004 (age 22)
- Weight: 128 kg (282 lb)

Sport
- Country: China
- Sport: Weightlifting
- Event: Women's +86 kg
Medal record
Representing China
World Championships
Gold medal – first place	2024 Manama	+87 kg
Gold medal – first place	2026 Ningbo	+86 kg
Asian Championships
Gold medal – first place	2025 Jiangshan	+87 kg
Gold medal – first place	2026 Gandhinagar	+86 kg
National Games of China
Gold medal – first place	2025 Guangdong	+87 kg

Li Yan (Chinese: 李闫; born 1 September 2004 in Tangchi) is a Chinese weightlifter. She won the World and Asian championships in 2024 and 2025 respectively and holds the snatch world record in the +87kg category.

In 2025 she won the National Games over Olympic champion Li Wenwen.

== Career ==
She started weightlifting in 2018, at the age of 14. In 2019, she won the Heilongjiang Provincial Championship . In 2020, she became a member of the Heilongjiang Provincial Team In 2021, Li Yan placed eighth at the National Games.

At the 2024 World Championships in Bahrain, the Chinese athlete won the gold medal in the over-87 kg category with a combined total of 324 kg. She also won each of her individual events, and set a new world record of 149 kg in the snatch.

In 2025, she won the National Games in the over 87 kg category, beating two-time Olympic champion Li Wenwen .

At the 2026 World Championships in Ningbo, China, she became a two-time world champion in the over-86 kg weight class with a combined total of 317 kg. She also won two small gold medals in individual events and set a world record in the snatch—147 kg.
