= 2010 World Weightlifting Championships – Women's 58 kg =

The women's competition in the lightweight (– 58 kg) division was held on 18 and 19 September 2010.

== Schedule ==
Date	Time	Event
18 September 2010	20:30	Group C
19 September 2010	09:30	Group B
19 September 2010	15:00	Group A

== Medalists ==
Event	Gold		Silver		Bronze	
Snatch	Pak Hyon-suk (PRK)	103 kg	Nastassia Novikava (BLR)	103 kg	Deng Wei (CHN)	102 kg
Clean & Jerk	Deng Wei (CHN)	135 kg	Jong Chun-mi (PRK)	130 kg	Nastassia Novikava (BLR)	130 kg
Total	Deng Wei (CHN)	237 kg	Nastassia Novikava (BLR)	233 kg	Jong Chun-mi (PRK)	230 kg

== Records ==
Prior to this competition, the existing world records were as follows.

World Record	Snatch	Chen Yanqing (CHN)	111 kg	Doha, Qatar	3 December 2006
World Record	Clean & Jerk	Qiu Hongmei (CHN)	141 kg	Tai'an, China	23 April 2007
World Record	Total	Chen Yanqing (CHN)	251 kg	Doha, Qatar	3 December 2006

== Results ==
Rank	Athlete	Group	Body weight	Snatch (kg)				Clean & Jerk (kg)				Total
Rank	Athlete	Group	Body weight	1	2	3	Rank	1	2	3	Rank	Total
1st place, gold medalist(s)	Deng Wei (CHN)	A	57.54	93	~~102~~	102	3rd place, bronze medalist(s)	120	131	135	1st place, gold medalist(s)	237
2nd place, silver medalist(s)	Nastassia Novikava (BLR)	A	57.82	97	101	103	2nd place, silver medalist(s)	~~128~~	~~128~~	130	3rd place, bronze medalist(s)	233
3rd place, bronze medalist(s)	Jong Chun-mi (PRK)	A	57.82	95	100	~~102~~	5	126	130	~~132~~	2nd place, silver medalist(s)	230
4	Alexandra Escobar (ECU)	A	57.24	95	~~100~~	100	4	120	124	127	4	227
5	Yuliya Kalina (UKR)	A	57.22	94	~~97~~	~~97~~	9	117	122	126	5	220
6	Wandee Kameaim (THA)	A	57.76	93	~~96~~	96	6	120	~~124~~	~~124~~	7	216
7	Jackelina Heredia (COL)	A	57.19	87	91	93	10	~~115~~	115	120	6	213
8	Pimsiri Sirikaew (THA)	B	57.69	89	~~92~~	~~92~~	15	115	118	~~120~~	8	207
9	Marieta Gotfryd (POL)	A	57.98	~~91~~	91	95	8	110	~~113~~	~~113~~	14	205
10	Yang Eun-hye (KOR)	B	57.83	85	~~90~~	~~90~~	20	117	~~123~~	~~123~~	9	202
11	Patricia Domínguez (MEX)	B	57.77	87	90	~~92~~	13	108	111	~~114~~	11	201
12	Iulia Paratova (UKR)	B	56.94	~~87~~	87	90	12	107	~~110~~	110	13	200
13	Bediha Tunadağı (TUR)	B	57.51	85	89	~~92~~	14	111	~~115~~	~~115~~	10	200
14	Okta Dwi Pramita (INA)	B	56.90	~~85~~	85	~~89~~	18	110	~~115~~	~~115~~	12	195
15	Amanda Sandoval (USA)	B	57.85	84	86	~~88~~	16	105	109	~~112~~	15	195
16	Yusleidy Figueroa (VEN)	C	56.50	83	~~85~~	~~85~~	21	104	~~108~~	~~111~~	17	187
17	Sabine Kusterer (GER)	B	57.51	~~83~~	83	~~85~~	22	~~98~~	98	101	21	184
18	Aleksandra Klejnowska (POL)	B	57.78	80	82	~~84~~	24	102	~~106~~	~~106~~	19	184
19	Emily Quarton (CAN)	C	57.98	80	~~83~~	~~83~~	26	~~100~~	100	104	18	184
20	Annie Moniqui (CAN)	C	57.34	79	82	~~84~~	23	96	99	101	20	183
21	Fetie Kasaj (ALB)	B	57.72	77	~~82~~	~~82~~	28	100	~~105~~	105	16	182
22	Giorgia Bordignon (ITA)	C	57.29	80	85	~~87~~	19	90	~~96~~	96	23	181
23	Heidi Harju (FIN)	C	57.90	82	~~86~~	86	17	95	~~98~~	~~98~~	25	181
24	Chandreshori Devi (IND)	C	57.74	~~80~~	80	~~85~~	25	~~98~~	98	~~103~~	22	178
25	Manzurakhon Mamasalieva (UZB)	C	57.29	~~78~~	78	~~81~~	27	95	~~101~~	~~105~~	24	173
26	Ayesha Al-Balooshi (UAE)	C	54.48	~~40~~	42	45	29	52	58	~~61~~	27	103
27	Muna Ahmed Saleh (UAE)	C	54.40	~~40~~	40	~~42~~	30	50	55	58	26	98
—	Pak Hyon-suk (PRK)	A	57.67	~~102~~	~~102~~	103	1st place, gold medalist(s)	~~130~~	~~130~~	~~130~~	—	—
—	Romela Begaj (ALB)	A	57.71	95	~~97~~	~~97~~	7	~~110~~	~~110~~	~~110~~	—	—
—	Ho Hsiao-chun (TPE)	B	57.76	88	92	~~95~~	11	~~118~~	~~118~~	~~118~~	—	—
—	Wildry de los Santos (DOM)	B	57.77	~~84~~	~~84~~	~~84~~	—	—	—	—	—	—
—	Gongoryn Otgontuyaa (MGL)	C	57.87	~~81~~	81	~~84~~	—	~~100~~	103	~~103~~	—	—
—	Pilar Bakam (CMR)	C	57.93	70	75	~~78~~	—	90	~~95~~	~~95~~	—	—
