= Weightlifting at the 2010 Asian Games – Women's 58 kg =

Women's 58 kg at the 2010 Asian Games
- Venue: Dongguan Arena
- Date: 15 November 2010
- Competitors: 15 from 12 nations

Medalists
gold medal	Li Xueying	China
silver medal	Pak Hyon-suk	North Korea
bronze medal	Jong Chun-mi	North Korea

The women's 58 kilograms event at the 2010 Asian Games took place on 15 November 2010 at Dongguan Arena.

== Schedule ==
All times are China Standard Time (UTC+08:00)

Date	Time	Event
Monday, 15 November 2010	14:30	Group B
Monday, 15 November 2010	19:00	Group A

== Records ==
Prior to this competition, the existing world, Asian and Games records were as follows.

World Record	Snatch	Chen Yanqing (CHN)	111 kg	Doha, Qatar	3 December 2006
World Record	Clean & Jerk	Qiu Hongmei (CHN)	141 kg	Tai'an, China	23 April 2007
World Record	Total	Chen Yanqing (CHN)	251 kg	Doha, Qatar	3 December 2006
Asian Record	Snatch	Chen Yanqing (CHN)	111 kg	Doha, Qatar	3 December 2006
Asian Record	Clean & Jerk	Qiu Hongmei (CHN)	141 kg	Tai'an, China	23 April 2007
Asian Record	Total	Chen Yanqing (CHN)	251 kg	Doha, Qatar	3 December 2006
Games Record	Snatch	Chen Yanqing (CHN)	111 kg	Doha, Qatar	3 December 2006
Games Record	Clean & Jerk	Chen Yanqing (CHN)	140 kg	Doha, Qatar	3 December 2006
Games Record	Total	Chen Yanqing (CHN)	251 kg	Doha, Qatar	3 December 2006

== Results ==
Legend

- NM — No mark

Rank	Athlete	Group	Body weight	Snatch (kg)				Clean & Jerk (kg)				Total
Rank	Athlete	Group	Body weight	1	2	3	Result	1	2	3	Result	Total
1st place, gold medalist(s)	Li Xueying (CHN)	A	57.37	100	105	~~107~~	105	128	133	~~135~~	133	238
2nd place, silver medalist(s)	Pak Hyon-suk (PRK)	A	57.54	100	104	~~106~~	104	~~128~~	128	~~135~~	128	232
3rd place, bronze medalist(s)	Jong Chun-mi (PRK)	A	57.77	93	97	98	98	122	~~126~~	127	127	225
4	Pimsiri Sirikaew (THA)	A	57.74	90	93	97	97	118	123	~~128~~	123	220
5	Wandee Kameaim (THA)	A	57.54	93	~~97~~	~~97~~	93	~~120~~	~~120~~	120	120	213
6	Hidilyn Diaz (PHI)	B	57.56	90	94	~~97~~	94	111	~~115~~	115	115	209
7	Okta Dwi Pramita (INA)	B	57.34	88	~~91~~	~~91~~	88	112	118	~~121~~	118	206
8	Raema Lisa Rumbewas (INA)	B	56.99	90	~~94~~	94	94	~~111~~	~~111~~	111	111	205
9	Ho Hsiao-chun (TPE)	A	57.55	87	~~90~~	90	90	112	~~117~~	~~117~~	112	202
10	Mayu Hashida (JPN)	B	57.72	86	88	90	90	108	111	~~114~~	111	201
11	Svetlana Cheremshanova (KAZ)	A	57.03	~~85~~	85	~~90~~	85	110	115	~~116~~	115	200
12	Gongoryn Otgontuyaa (MGL)	B	57.80	83	86	~~89~~	86	~~102~~	102	103	103	189
13	Fayema Akther (BAN)	B	57.71	~~65~~	65	~~70~~	65	85	90	~~93~~	90	155
14	Agostinha Tilman (TLS)	B	55.58	35	~~40~~	~~40~~	35	~~45~~	45	~~47~~	45	80
—	Yang Eun-hye (KOR)	A	57.84	~~87~~	~~87~~	~~87~~	—	—	—	—	—	NM
