= 2011 World Weightlifting Championships – Women's 58 kg =

The women's competition in the lightweight (58 kg) division was held on 7 November 2011.

== Schedule ==
Date	Time	Event
7 November 2011	14:00	Group C
7 November 2011	16:30	Group B
7 November 2011	19:00	Group A

== Medalists ==
Event	Gold		Silver		Bronze	
Snatch	Li Xueying (CHN)	103 kg	Nastassia Novikava (BLR)	101 kg	Romela Begaj (ALB)	100 kg
Clean & Jerk	Nastassia Novikava (BLR)	136 kg	Li Xueying (CHN)	133 kg	Pimsiri Sirikaew (THA)	131 kg
Total	Nastassia Novikava (BLR)	237 kg	Li Xueying (CHN)	236 kg	Pimsiri Sirikaew (THA)	230 kg

== Records ==
Prior to this competition, the existing world records were as follows.

World Record	Snatch	Chen Yanqing (CHN)	111 kg	Doha, Qatar	3 December 2006
World Record	Clean & Jerk	Qiu Hongmei (CHN)	141 kg	Tai'an, China	23 April 2007
World Record	Total	Chen Yanqing (CHN)	251 kg	Doha, Qatar	3 December 2006

== Results ==
Rank	Athlete	Group	Body weight	Snatch (kg)				Clean & Jerk (kg)				Total
Rank	Athlete	Group	Body weight	1	2	3	Rank	1	2	3	Rank	Total
1st place, gold medalist(s)	Nastassia Novikava (BLR)	A	57.89	101	~~104~~	~~104~~	2nd place, silver medalist(s)	125	129	136	1st place, gold medalist(s)	237
2nd place, silver medalist(s)	Li Xueying (CHN)	A	57.72	~~103~~	103	~~108~~	1st place, gold medalist(s)	128	131	133	2nd place, silver medalist(s)	236
3rd place, bronze medalist(s)	Pimsiri Sirikaew (THA)	A	57.61	95	99	~~102~~	5	123	129	131	3rd place, bronze medalist(s)	230
4	Yuliya Kalina (UKR)	A	57.62	97	~~100~~	100	4	123	~~128~~	~~128~~	6	223
5	Jong Chun-mi (PRK)	A	57.86	95	~~101~~	~~101~~	10	127	~~131~~	~~131~~	4	222
6	Jackelina Heredia (COL)	A	57.52	92	95	~~97~~	8	120	125	~~127~~	5	220
7	Hidilyn Diaz (PHI)	A	57.73	92	~~95~~	95	9	119	~~121~~	~~123~~	7	214
8	Romela Begaj (ALB)	B	57.32	93	96	100	3rd place, bronze medalist(s)	113	~~116~~	~~116~~	14	213
9	Alexandra Escobar (ECU)	A	57.26	~~95~~	95	~~98~~	6	117	~~120~~	—	10	212
10	Kuo Hsing-chun (TPE)	A	57.26	90	94	~~96~~	11	118	~~122~~	~~122~~	8	212
11	Kateryna Driumova (UKR)	B	57.23	90	~~93~~	93	12	110	115	117	9	210
12	Aleksandra Klejnowska (POL)	A	57.59	88	90	~~92~~	14	~~115~~	115	~~119~~	12	205
13	Bediha Tunadağı (TUR)	B	57.64	~~90~~	~~90~~	90	15	110	~~115~~	115	13	205
14	Mikiko Ando (JPN)	B	57.67	82	85	~~87~~	23	112	115	117	11	202
15	Christin Ulrich (GER)	C	57.39	83	87	88	17	105	109	111	16	199
16	Yang Eun-hye (KOR)	B	58.00	83	86	~~89~~	21	108	113	~~116~~	15	199
17	Patricia Domínguez (MEX)	B	58.00	~~87~~	87	~~90~~	20	106	110	~~113~~	17	197
18	Amanda Sandoval (USA)	B	57.16	86	~~89~~	89	16	105	107	~~110~~	19	196
19	Dominika Misterska (POL)	B	57.65	~~87~~	87	~~89~~	18	107	109	~~110~~	18	196
20	Rizelyx Rivera (USA)	B	57.55	84	88	91	13	104	~~108~~	~~108~~	23	195
21	Sabine Kusterer (GER)	C	56.17	83	86	87	19	102	105	~~107~~	22	192
22	Annie Moniqui (CAN)	C	57.48	82	85	~~86~~	22	103	105	106	20	191
23	Onyeka Azike (NGR)	C	56.17	80	~~83~~	83	24	100	~~105~~	105	21	188
24	Giorgia Bordignon (ITA)	C	57.74	80	~~83~~	~~83~~	27	95	99	101	24	181
25	Maria Liku (FIJ)	C	57.69	~~73~~	73	80	26	93	98	~~102~~	27	178
26	Maibam Sunibala Devi (IND)	C	57.36	76	~~79~~	~~79~~	29	94	97	100	25	176
27	Jenly Tegu Wini (SOL)	C	57.52	71	74	~~77~~	30	92	~~98~~	98	26	172
28	Seen Lee (AUS)	C	57.69	78	~~82~~	~~82~~	28	93	~~99~~	—	28	171
—	Jo Pok-hyang (PRK)	A	57.50	95	~~101~~	~~101~~	7	~~127~~	~~127~~	~~127~~	—	—
—	Gongoryn Otgontuyaa (MGL)	C	57.85	~~83~~	83	~~87~~	25	~~102~~	~~102~~	~~102~~	—	—
—	Fetie Kasaj (ALB)	C	57.37	64	~~70~~	~~70~~	31	~~101~~	~~101~~	~~101~~	—	—
