= 2006 World Weightlifting Championships – Women's 58 kg =

The 2006 World Weightlifting Championships were held in Santo Domingo, Dominican Republic from 30 September to 7 October. The women's 58 kilograms division was staged on 3 October 2006.

== Schedule ==
Date	Time	Event
3 October 2006	12:00	Group B
3 October 2006	16:00	Group A

== Medalists ==
Event	Gold		Silver		Bronze	
Snatch	Svetlana Tsarukaeva (RUS)	108 kg	Qiu Hongmei (CHN)	107 kg	Wandee Kameaim (THA)	100 kg
Clean & Jerk	Wandee Kameaim (THA)	130 kg	Qiu Hongmei (CHN)	130 kg	Svetlana Tsarukaeva (RUS)	125 kg
Total	Qiu Hongmei (CHN)	237 kg	Svetlana Tsarukaeva (RUS)	233 kg	Wandee Kameaim (THA)	230 kg

== Records ==
Prior to this competition, the existing world records were as follows.

World Record	Snatch	Wang Li (CHN)	110 kg	Bali, Indonesia	10 August 2003
World Record	Clean & Jerk	Gu Wei (CHN)	139 kg	Doha, Qatar	10 November 2005
World Record	Total	Gu Wei (CHN)	241 kg	Doha, Qatar	10 November 2005

== Results ==
Rank	Athlete	Group	Body weight	Snatch (kg)				Clean & Jerk (kg)				Total
Rank	Athlete	Group	Body weight	1	2	3	Rank	1	2	3	Rank	Total
1st place, gold medalist(s)	Qiu Hongmei (CHN)	A	57.62	100	105	107	2nd place, silver medalist(s)	~~130~~	130	~~136~~	2nd place, silver medalist(s)	237
2nd place, silver medalist(s)	Svetlana Tsarukaeva (RUS)	A	57.84	100	105	108	1st place, gold medalist(s)	~~125~~	~~125~~	125	3rd place, bronze medalist(s)	233
3rd place, bronze medalist(s)	Wandee Kameaim (THA)	A	57.01	~~95~~	95	100	3rd place, bronze medalist(s)	125	130	~~135~~	1st place, gold medalist(s)	230
4	Yoon Jin-hee (KOR)	A	56.01	90	94	~~97~~	4	113	118	~~123~~	4	212
5	Aleksandra Klejnowska (POL)	A	57.68	90	~~93~~	~~94~~	7	118	~~123~~	~~123~~	5	208
6	Mercedes Pérez (COL)	A	57.96	~~90~~	~~90~~	90	8	105	~~111~~	111	8	201
7	Marieta Gotfryd (POL)	A	57.28	86	91	~~93~~	6	105	~~109~~	109	11	200
8	Mónica Picón (COL)	B	57.18	~~84~~	84	87	10	107	110	112	6	199
9	Mun Yu-ra (KOR)	B	57.96	83	~~87~~	87	11	105	109	112	7	199
10	Natthaneeya Chanpook (THA)	A	56.96	82	~~87~~	87	9	~~110~~	~~110~~	110	9	197
11	Jacquelynn Berube (USA)	A	58.00	~~86~~	~~86~~	86	14	105	~~109~~	109	14	195
12	Gretty Lugo (VEN)	B	57.72	82	~~85~~	85	16	103	106	109	13	194
13	Souad Dinar (FRA)	A	57.89	~~82~~	82	~~85~~	20	108	110	~~113~~	10	192
14	Ruth Kasirye (NOR)	A	57.86	86	~~90~~	~~90~~	13	105	~~109~~	~~109~~	17	191
15	Natallia Radukhouskaya (BLR)	A	57.72	80	~~85~~	~~85~~	25	105	109	~~112~~	12	189
16	Alexandra Escobar (ECU)	A	57.63	82	~~85~~	85	15	~~103~~	~~103~~	103	19	188
17	Charikleia Kastritsi (GRE)	B	57.78	81	~~84~~	84	17	96	100	104	18	188
18	Kamilya Bagautdinova (KAZ)	B	57.66	~~78~~	78	81	21	100	105	~~107~~	16	186
19	Geralee Vega (PUR)	B	56.90	80	~~85~~	~~85~~	23	~~105~~	~~105~~	105	15	185
20	Seen Lee (AUS)	B	57.77	81	84	86	12	~~97~~	97	~~100~~	23	183
21	Emily Quarton (CAN)	B	57.99	80	~~83~~	83	18	100	~~105~~	~~105~~	21	183
22	Larissa Saint-Jacques (FRA)	B	57.70	78	82	~~84~~	19	97	100	~~102~~	20	182
23	Amanda Hubbard (USA)	B	57.86	78	80	~~82~~	26	~~98~~	~~98~~	98	22	178
24	Lin Wan-hsuan (TPE)	B	57.90	78	~~81~~	81	22	90	~~95~~	95	25	176
25	Heydy Silva (DOM)	B	56.94	75	78	80	24	85	90	~~95~~	28	170
26	Szilvia Nagy (HUN)	B	57.74	72	~~75~~	75	27	90	95	~~97~~	24	170
27	Idalia Salinas (ESA)	B	57.99	~~73~~	73	~~76~~	28	~~95~~	95	~~98~~	26	168
28	Bianka Bazsó (HUN)	B	57.86	~~67~~	67	72	30	85	90	92	27	164
29	Tania Morillas (ESP)	B	57.57	67	70	72	29	77	80	83	29	155
—	Romela Begaj (ALB)	A	55.89	~~91~~	~~91~~	91	5	~~106~~	~~106~~	~~106~~	—	—
