= 2009 World Weightlifting Championships – Women's 58 kg =

The women's competition in the lightweight (– 58 kg) division was staged on November 23, 2009.

== Schedule ==
Date	Time	Event
23 November 2009	16:00	Group B
23 November 2009	19:00	Group A

== Medalists ==
Event	Gold		Silver		Bronze	
Snatch	Li Xueying (CHN)	107 kg	Nastassia Novikava (BLR)	100 kg	Yuliya Kalina (UKR)	96 kg
Clean & Jerk	Li Xueying (CHN)	132 kg	Nastassia Novikava (BLR)	125 kg	Yuliya Kalina (UKR)	119 kg
Total	Li Xueying (CHN)	239 kg	Nastassia Novikava (BLR)	225 kg	Yuliya Kalina (UKR)	215 kg

== Records ==
Prior to this competition, the existing world records were as follows.

World Record	Snatch	Chen Yanqing (CHN)	111 kg	Doha, Qatar	3 December 2006
World Record	Clean & Jerk	Qiu Hongmei (CHN)	141 kg	Tai'an, China	23 April 2007
World Record	Total	Chen Yanqing (CHN)	251 kg	Doha, Qatar	3 December 2006

== Results ==
Rank	Athlete	Group	Body weight	Snatch (kg)				Clean & Jerk (kg)				Total
Rank	Athlete	Group	Body weight	1	2	3	Rank	1	2	3	Rank	Total
1st place, gold medalist(s)	Li Xueying (CHN)	A	57.42	100	105	107	1st place, gold medalist(s)	125	130	132	1st place, gold medalist(s)	239
2nd place, silver medalist(s)	Nastassia Novikava (BLR)	A	57.98	95	100	~~106~~	2nd place, silver medalist(s)	120	125	~~131~~	2nd place, silver medalist(s)	225
3rd place, bronze medalist(s)	Yuliya Kalina (UKR)	A	57.46	91	94	96	3rd place, bronze medalist(s)	115	119	~~126~~	3rd place, bronze medalist(s)	215
4	Romela Begaj (ALB)	A	57.52	92	95	~~97~~	4	108	~~112~~	112	6	207
5	Pimsiri Sirikaew (THA)	A	57.35	85	90	~~93~~	5	115	~~120~~	~~120~~	5	205
6	Marieta Gotfryd (POL)	A	57.83	~~90~~	90	~~92~~	6	~~107~~	107	~~110~~	10	197
7	Quisia Guicho (MEX)	A	57.22	83	85	88	7	107	~~115~~	~~115~~	8	195
8	Masako Tokeshi (JPN)	A	57.66	82	85	~~87~~	8	103	106	110	7	195
9	Agnès Chiquet (FRA)	B	57.54	79	~~83~~	83	10	104	107	~~110~~	9	190
10	Wildry de los Santos (DOM)	A	57.72	~~84~~	84	~~89~~	9	106	~~111~~	~~111~~	11	190
11	Emily Quarton (CAN)	B	57.95	78	~~81~~	81	11	~~98~~	98	102	13	183
12	Hilary Katzenmeier (USA)	B	57.98	78	~~81~~	81	12	~~98~~	98	~~101~~	14	179
13	Pilar Bakam (CMR)	B	57.54	70	75	~~79~~	14	97	102	~~105~~	12	177
14	So Wai Ching (HKG)	B	55.67	30	33	36	15	35	40	42	16	78
—	Margaret Uwah (NGR)	B	56.83	76	80	~~84~~	13	—	—	—	—	—
—	Lin Wan-hsuan (TPE)	A	57.05	~~92~~	~~92~~	~~95~~	—	~~117~~	~~117~~	117	4	—
—	Anna Everi (FIN)	B	57.93	~~74~~	~~74~~	~~74~~	—	91	~~95~~	—	15	—
