= 2007 World Weightlifting Championships – Women's 58 kg =

The women's competition in 58 kg division was staged on September 21–22, 2007.

== Schedule ==
Date	Time	Event
21 September 2007	09:30	Group C
21 September 2007	14:30	Group B
22 September 2007	20:00	Group A

== Medalists ==
Event	Gold		Silver		Bronze	
Snatch	Marina Shainova (RUS)	105 kg	Qiu Hongmei (CHN)	103 kg	O Jong-ae (PRK)	100 kg
Clean & Jerk	Qiu Hongmei (CHN)	135 kg	Marina Shainova (RUS)	132 kg	O Jong-ae (PRK)	127 kg
Total	Qiu Hongmei (CHN)	238 kg	Marina Shainova (RUS)	237 kg	O Jong-ae (PRK)	227 kg

== Records ==
Prior to this competition, the existing world records were as follows.

World Record	Snatch	Chen Yanqing (CHN)	111 kg	Doha, Qatar	3 December 2006
World Record	Clean & Jerk	Qiu Hongmei (CHN)	141 kg	Tai'an, China	23 April 2007
World Record	Total	Chen Yanqing (CHN)	251 kg	Doha, Qatar	3 December 2006

== Results ==
Rank	Athlete	Group	Body weight	Snatch (kg)				Clean & Jerk (kg)				Total
Rank	Athlete	Group	Body weight	1	2	3	Rank	1	2	3	Rank	Total
1st place, gold medalist(s)	Qiu Hongmei (CHN)	A	57.56	~~103~~	103	~~107~~	2nd place, silver medalist(s)	~~133~~	~~133~~	135	1st place, gold medalist(s)	238
2nd place, silver medalist(s)	Marina Shainova (RUS)	A	57.30	102	105	~~107~~	1st place, gold medalist(s)	~~132~~	~~132~~	132	2nd place, silver medalist(s)	237
3rd place, bronze medalist(s)	O Jong-ae (PRK)	A	57.06	95	98	100	3rd place, bronze medalist(s)	123	125	127	3rd place, bronze medalist(s)	227
4	Wandee Kameaim (THA)	A	57.55	95	~~98~~	~~99~~	5	120	125	127	4	222
5	Alexandra Escobar (ECU)	A	57.34	95	99	~~101~~	4	118	121	~~124~~	6	220
6	Aleksandra Klejnowska (POL)	A	57.24	~~90~~	90	93	8	120	~~123~~	123	5	216
7	Sureerat Thongsuk (THA)	A	57.37	86	91	~~95~~	9	112	116	118	7	209
8	Ruth Kasirye (NOR)	A	57.96	92	94	~~96~~	7	115	~~118~~	~~118~~	9	209
9	Marieta Gotfryd (POL)	A	57.69	95	~~100~~	~~101~~	6	113	~~115~~	~~118~~	10	208
10	Mun Yu-ra (KOR)	A	57.54	90	~~94~~	~~94~~	11	110	~~115~~	116	8	206
11	Rusmeris Villar (COL)	B	57.31	84	87	~~90~~	12	107	111	~~113~~	12	198
12	Anna Athanasiadou (GRE)	B	57.49	85	~~90~~	91	10	100	105	107	17	198
13	Svetlana Vinogradova (KAZ)	C	57.17	80	85	~~87~~	15	107	~~112~~	112	11	197
14	Souad Dinar (FRA)	B	57.59	83	~~85~~	85	17	106	~~109~~	109	15	194
15	María Cecilia Floriddia (ARG)	B	57.88	85	~~87~~	~~87~~	19	105	108	109	16	194
16	Margaret Uwah (NGR)	B	57.36	~~82~~	82	~~85~~	23	107	~~111~~	111	13	193
17	Yumnam Chanu (IND)	C	57.68	82	85	86	14	105	~~108~~	~~108~~	20	191
18	Seda İnce (TUR)	B	57.21	~~85~~	~~85~~	85	16	105	~~108~~	~~108~~	18	190
19	Ho Hsiao-chun (TPE)	B	57.73	~~85~~	~~85~~	85	18	105	~~109~~	~~109~~	21	190
20	Aylin Daşdelen (TUR)	B	57.76	~~80~~	80	~~85~~	26	110	~~113~~	~~113~~	14	190
21	Tseng Tzu-jung (TPE)	B	57.29	80	~~84~~	84	20	100	105	~~109~~	19	189
22	Charikleia Kastritsi (GRE)	C	57.95	78	~~83~~	83	22	97	102	105	22	188
23	Seen Lee (AUS)	B	57.60	~~86~~	86	~~89~~	13	101	~~106~~	~~106~~	26	187
24	Heghine Yepremyan (ARM)	C	57.30	77	~~81~~	81	24	97	101	~~104~~	25	182
25	Wildry de los Santos (DOM)	C	57.49	75	~~81~~	~~81~~	29	98	102	~~107~~	23	177
26	Jacinthe Deschênes (CAN)	C	57.60	~~76~~	76	80	25	93	97	~~100~~	28	177
27	Quisia Guicho (MEX)	C	57.70	75	~~80~~	~~80~~	30	95	100	102	24	177
28	Liana Manukyan (ARM)	C	55.17	~~75~~	75	~~80~~	27	95	~~100~~	100	27	175
29	Szilvia Nagy (HUN)	C	57.31	~~75~~	75	~~79~~	28	95	~~101~~	~~101~~	30	170
30	Wendy Hale (SOL)	C	57.45	74	~~78~~	~~78~~	31	~~96~~	96	~~101~~	29	170
—	Nguyễn Thị Yến (VIE)	C	57.73	80	83	~~87~~	21	~~95~~	~~95~~	~~95~~	—	—
DQ	Thaw Yae Faw (MYA)	A	56.65	85	90	95	—	110	115	120	—	—
DQ	Kamilya Bagautdinova (KAZ)	B	57.30	82	87	90	—	110	115	~~117~~	—	—
