= 2005 World Weightlifting Championships – Women's 58 kg =

The 2005 World Weightlifting Championships were held in Doha, Qatar from 9 November to 17 November. The women's 58 kilograms division was staged on 11 November 2005.

== Schedule ==
Date	Time	Event
11 November 2005	13:00	Group B
11 November 2005	17:30	Group A

== Medalists ==
Event	Gold		Silver		Bronze	
Snatch	Gu Wei (CHN)	102 kg	Wandee Kameaim (THA)	101 kg	Marina Shainova (RUS)	101 kg
Clean & Jerk	Gu Wei (CHN)	139 kg	Wandee Kameaim (THA)	135 kg	Marina Shainova (RUS)	132 kg
Total	Gu Wei (CHN)	241 kg	Wandee Kameaim (THA)	236 kg	Marina Shainova (RUS)	233 kg

== Records ==
Prior to this competition, the existing world records were as follows.

World record	Snatch	Wang Li (CHN)	110 kg	Bali, Indonesia	10 August 2003
World record	Clean & Jerk	Sun Caiyan (CHN)	133 kg	İzmir, Turkey	28 June 2002
World record	Total	Wang Li (CHN)	240 kg	Bali, Indonesia	10 August 2003

== Results ==
Rank	Athlete	Group	Body weight	Snatch (kg)				Clean & Jerk (kg)				Total
Rank	Athlete	Group	Body weight	1	2	3	Rank	1	2	3	Rank	Total
1st place, gold medalist(s)	Gu Wei (CHN)	A	57.40	~~100~~	~~101~~	102	1st place, gold medalist(s)	130	136	139	1st place, gold medalist(s)	241
2nd place, silver medalist(s)	Wandee Kameaim (THA)	A	57.38	96	~~100~~	101	2nd place, silver medalist(s)	125	132	135	2nd place, silver medalist(s)	236
3rd place, bronze medalist(s)	Marina Shainova (RUS)	A	57.91	~~97~~	97	101	3rd place, bronze medalist(s)	125	132	~~135~~	3rd place, bronze medalist(s)	233
4	Yoon Jin-hee (KOR)	A	55.35	89	95	~~97~~	5	113	117	120	4	215
5	Marieta Gotfryd (POL)	A	57.45	92	96	~~99~~	4	113	~~116~~	116	6	212
6	Esmat Mansour (EGY)	A	57.32	~~88~~	~~90~~	90	6	110	~~114~~	114	7	204
7	Jacquelynn Berube (USA)	B	57.57	86	~~89~~	89	7	105	~~108~~	109	10	198
8	Souad Dinar (FRA)	A	57.74	84	86	~~88~~	9	112	~~115~~	~~115~~	8	198
9	Mercedes Pérez (COL)	B	57.55	82	86	88	8	~~105~~	105	109	9	197
10	Rusmeris Villar (COL)	B	56.97	80	83	85	10	102	105	108	11	193
11	Roxana Cocoș (ROM)	B	57.79	73	79	~~82~~	13	105	~~107~~	108	12	187
12	Ruth Kasirye (NOR)	B	57.99	78	82	~~85~~	11	98	~~103~~	103	14	185
13	Charikleia Kastritsi (GRE)	B	57.66	80	~~83~~	~~83~~	12	100	103	~~105~~	13	183
14	Shahria Sultana Suchi (BAN)	B	57.82	55	~~57~~	57	14	~~70~~	70	73	15	130
—	Aleksandra Klejnowska (POL)	A	57.30	~~91~~	~~91~~	~~92~~	—	120	~~126~~	~~126~~	5	—

== New records ==
Clean & Jerk	135 kg	Wandee Kameaim (THA)	WR
Clean & Jerk	136 kg	Gu Wei (CHN)	WR
Clean & Jerk	139 kg	Gu Wei (CHN)	WR
Total	241 kg	Gu Wei (CHN)	WR
