= 2009 Asian Weightlifting Championships =

International weightlifting competition

The 2009 Asian Weightlifting Championships were held in Taldykorgan, Kazakhstan between May 11 and May 15, 2009. It was the 40th men's and 21st women's championship.

== Medal summary ==
=== Men ===
| Event | Gold | | Silver | | Bronze | |
56 kg
| Snatch | Hoàng Anh Tuấn; Vietnam | 125 kg | Ji Guohua; China | 123 kg | Ri Kyong-sok; North Korea | 122 kg |
| Clean & Jerk | Ji Guohua; China | 158 kg | Hoàng Anh Tuấn; Vietnam | 153 kg | Ri Kyong-sok; North Korea | 150 kg |
| Total | Ji Guohua; China | 281 kg | Hoàng Anh Tuấn; Vietnam | 278 kg | Ri Kyong-sok; North Korea | 272 kg |
62 kg
| Snatch | Ding Jianjun; China | 141 kg | Cha Kum-chol; North Korea | 140 kg | Ümürbek Bazarbaýew; Turkmenistan | 132 kg |
| Clean & Jerk | Ding Jianjun; China | 169 kg | Cha Kum-chol; North Korea | 165 kg | Yang Sheng-hsiung; Chinese Taipei | 160 kg |
| Total | Ding Jianjun; China | 310 kg | Cha Kum-chol; North Korea | 305 kg | Yang Sheng-hsiung; Chinese Taipei | 288 kg |
69 kg
| Snatch | Triyatno; Indonesia | 145 kg | Gustar Junianto; Indonesia | 143 kg | Bakhram Mendibaev; Uzbekistan | 141 kg |
| Clean & Jerk | Triyatno; Indonesia | 180 kg | Zheng Zhisheng; China | 175 kg | Lee Kun-ho; South Korea | 173 kg |
| Total | Triyatno; Indonesia | 325 kg | Zheng Zhisheng; China | 315 kg | Lee Kun-ho; South Korea | 310 kg |
77 kg
| Snatch | Lu Changliang; China | 156 kg | Kuanysh Rakhatov; Kazakhstan | 155 kg | Pang Kum-chol; North Korea | 154 kg |
| Clean & Jerk | Lu Changliang; China | 195 kg | Zhang Kaiguo; China | 193 kg | Pang Kum-chol; North Korea | 193 kg |
| Total | Lu Changliang; China | 351 kg | Pang Kum-chol; North Korea | 347 kg | Rasoul Taghian; Iran | 339 kg |
85 kg
| Snatch | Sohrab Moradi; Iran | 168 kg | Mansurbek Chashemov; Uzbekistan | 164 kg | Qi Ji; China | 162 kg |
| Clean & Jerk | Sohrab Moradi; Iran | 199 kg | Mansurbek Chashemov; Uzbekistan | 198 kg | Almas Uteshov; Kazakhstan | 197 kg |
| Total | Sohrab Moradi; Iran | 367 kg | Mansurbek Chashemov; Uzbekistan | 362 kg | Almas Uteshov; Kazakhstan | 357 kg |
94 kg
| Snatch | Huang Zhong; China | 175 kg | Yuan Aijun; China | 170 kg | Igor Vashanov; Kazakhstan | 170 kg |
| Clean & Jerk | Navab Nassirshalal; Iran | 207 kg | Huang Zhong; China | 205 kg | Igor Vashanov; Kazakhstan | 201 kg |
| Total | Huang Zhong; China | 380 kg | Navab Nassirshalal; Iran | 376 kg | Igor Vashanov; Kazakhstan | 371 kg |
105 kg
| Snatch | Sergey Istomin; Kazakhstan | 187 kg | Asghar Ebrahimi; Iran | 180 kg | Mohsen Beiranvand; Iran | 176 kg |
| Clean & Jerk | Ivan Efremov; Uzbekistan | 213 kg | Asghar Ebrahimi; Iran | 210 kg | Sergey Istomin; Kazakhstan | 210 kg |
| Total | Sergey Istomin; Kazakhstan | 397 kg | Asghar Ebrahimi; Iran | 390 kg | Ivan Efremov; Uzbekistan | 385 kg |
+105 kg
| Snatch | Behdad Salimi; Iran | 190 kg | Yakov Berkh; Kazakhstan | 175 kg | Kazuomi Ota; Japan | 170 kg |
| Clean & Jerk | Behdad Salimi; Iran | 231 kg | Yakov Berkh; Kazakhstan | 211 kg | Kazuomi Ota; Japan | 211 kg |
| Total | Behdad Salimi; Iran | 421 kg | Yakov Berkh; Kazakhstan | 386 kg | Kazuomi Ota; Japan | 381 kg |

=== Women ===
| Event | Gold | | Silver | | Bronze | |
48 kg
| Snatch | Chen Wei-ling; Chinese Taipei | 87 kg | Pensiri Laosirikul; Thailand | 83 kg | Chen Xiexia; China | 83 kg |
| Clean & Jerk | Chen Wei-ling; Chinese Taipei | 113 kg | Chen Xiexia; China | 108 kg | Pensiri Laosirikul; Thailand | 103 kg |
| Total | Chen Wei-ling; Chinese Taipei | 200 kg | Chen Xiexia; China | 191 kg | Pensiri Laosirikul; Thailand | 186 kg |
53 kg
| Snatch | Chen Xiaoting; China | 98 kg | Prapawadee Jaroenrattanatarakoon; Thailand | 94 kg | Fang Li-chun; Chinese Taipei | 93 kg |
| Clean & Jerk | Chen Xiaoting; China | 123 kg | Fang Li-chun; Chinese Taipei | 121 kg | Prapawadee Jaroenrattanatarakoon; Thailand | 120 kg |
| Total | Chen Xiaoting; China | 221 kg | Fang Li-chun; Chinese Taipei | 214 kg | Prapawadee Jaroenrattanatarakoon; Thailand | 214 kg |
58 kg
| Snatch | Li Xueying; China | 101 kg | Pak Hyon-suk; North Korea | 100 kg | Jong Chun-mi; North Korea | 97 kg |
| Clean & Jerk | Li Xueying; China | 134 kg | Pak Hyon-suk; North Korea | 133 kg | Jong Chun-mi; North Korea | 126 kg |
| Total | Li Xueying; China | 235 kg | Pak Hyon-suk; North Korea | 233 kg | Jong Chun-mi; North Korea | 223 kg |
63 kg
| Snatch | Liu Xia; Macau | 101 kg | Nguyễn Thị Thiết; Vietnam | 100 kg | Maiya Maneza; Kazakhstan | 98 kg |
| Clean & Jerk | O Jong-ae; North Korea | 132 kg | Maiya Maneza; Kazakhstan | 131 kg | Liu Xia; Macau | 130 kg |
| Total | Liu Xia; Macau | 231 kg | O Jong-ae; North Korea | 229 kg | Maiya Maneza; Kazakhstan | 229 kg |
69 kg
| Snatch | Zhang Shaoling; Macau | 107 kg | Liu Haixia; China | 105 kg | Wang Ya-jhen; Chinese Taipei | 102 kg |
| Clean & Jerk | Liu Haixia; China | 135 kg | Wang Ya-jhen; Chinese Taipei | 134 kg | Zhang Shaoling; Macau | 134 kg |
| Total | Zhang Shaoling; Macau | 241 kg | Liu Haixia; China | 240 kg | Wang Ya-jhen; Chinese Taipei | 236 kg |
75 kg
| Snatch | Svetlana Podobedova; Kazakhstan | 130 kg | Cao Lei; China | 115 kg | Lim Ji-hye; South Korea | 99 kg |
| Clean & Jerk | Svetlana Podobedova; Kazakhstan | 150 kg | Cao Lei; China | 143 kg | Watcharawadee Rattanachuang; Thailand | 128 kg |
| Total | Svetlana Podobedova; Kazakhstan | 280 kg | Cao Lei; China | 258 kg | Watcharawadee Rattanachuang; Thailand | 225 kg |
+75 kg
| Snatch | Tatyana Khromova; Kazakhstan | 115 kg | Annipa Moontar; Thailand | 114 kg | Wu Jian; China | 113 kg |
| Clean & Jerk | Tatyana Khromova; Kazakhstan | 143 kg | Wu Jian; China | 141 kg | Annipa Moontar; Thailand | 133 kg |
| Total | Tatyana Khromova; Kazakhstan | 258 kg | Wu Jian; China | 254 kg | Annipa Moontar; Thailand | 247 kg |

== Medal table ==
Ranking by Big (Total result) medals

| Rank | Nation | Gold | Silver | Bronze | Total |
|---|---|---|---|---|---|
| 1 | China | 6 | 5 | 0 | 11 |
| 2 | Kazakhstan | 3 | 1 | 3 | 7 |
| 3 | Iran | 2 | 2 | 1 | 5 |
| 4 | Macau | 2 | 0 | 0 | 2 |
| 5 | Chinese Taipei | 1 | 1 | 2 | 4 |
| 6 | Indonesia | 1 | 0 | 0 | 1 |
| 7 | North Korea | 0 | 4 | 2 | 6 |
| 8 | Uzbekistan | 0 | 1 | 1 | 2 |
| 9 | Vietnam | 0 | 1 | 0 | 1 |
| 10 | Thailand | 0 | 0 | 4 | 4 |
| 11 | Japan | 0 | 0 | 1 | 1 |
| 11 | South Korea | 0 | 0 | 1 | 1 |
| Totals (12 entries) | | 15 | 15 | 15 | 45 |

Ranking by all medals: Big (Total result) and Small (Snatch and Clean & Jerk)

| Rank | Nation | Gold | Silver | Bronze | Total |
|---|---|---|---|---|---|
| 1 | China | 17 | 15 | 3 | 35 |
| 2 | Kazakhstan | 8 | 5 | 8 | 21 |
| 3 | Iran | 7 | 4 | 2 | 13 |
| 4 | Macau | 4 | 0 | 2 | 6 |
| 5 | Chinese Taipei | 3 | 3 | 5 | 11 |
| 6 | Indonesia | 3 | 1 | 0 | 4 |
| 7 | North Korea | 1 | 8 | 8 | 17 |
| 8 | Uzbekistan | 1 | 3 | 2 | 6 |
| 9 | Vietnam | 1 | 3 | 0 | 4 |
| 10 | Thailand | 0 | 3 | 8 | 11 |
| 11 | Japan | 0 | 0 | 3 | 3 |
| 11 | South Korea | 0 | 0 | 3 | 3 |
| 13 | Turkmenistan | 0 | 0 | 1 | 1 |
| Totals (13 entries) | | 45 | 45 | 45 | 135 |

== Participating nations ==
157 athletes from 22 nations competed.

- Bangladesh (3)
- China (14)
- Chinese Taipei (10)
- India (15)
- Indonesia (9)
- Iran (8)
- Japan (13)
- Jordan (3)
- Kazakhstan (15)
- Kyrgyzstan (6)
- Macau (3)
- Malaysia (8)
- North Korea (7)
- Qatar (1)
- South Korea (7)
- Sri Lanka (1)
- Tajikistan (1)
- Thailand (9)
- Turkmenistan (8)
- United Arab Emirates (3)
- Uzbekistan (5)
- Vietnam (8)
