= Weightlifting at the 2012 Summer Olympics – Women's 58 kg =

Summer Olympics

Women's 58 kg at the Games of the XXX Olympiad
- Venue: ExCeL London
- Date: 30 July 2012
- Competitors: 19 from 17 nations

Medalists
1st place, gold medalist(s)		Li Xueying	China
2nd place, silver medalist(s)		Pimsiri Sirikaew	Thailand
3rd place, bronze medalist(s)		Rattikan Gulnoi	Thailand

The Women's 58 kilograms weightlifting event at the 2012 Summer Olympics in London, United Kingdom, took place at ExCeL London on 30 July.

== Summary ==
Total score was the sum of the lifter's best result in each of the snatch and the clean and jerk, with three lifts allowed for each lift. In case of a tie, the lighter lifter won; if still tied, the lifter who took the fewest attempts to achieve the total score won. Lifters without a valid snatch score did not perform the clean and jerk.

On 13 July 2016, IOC announced that Yuliya Kalina of Ukraine was disqualified from the 2012 Summer Olympics and ordered to return the bronze medal from this event. Reanalysis of Kalina's samples from London 2012 resulted in a positive test for the prohibited substance dehydrochlormethyltestosterone (turinabol). The positions were adjusted accordingly.

== Schedule ==
All times are British Summer Time (UTC+01:00)

Date	Time	Event
30 July 2012	12:30	Group B
30 July 2012	15:30	Group A

== Records ==
Prior to this competition, the existing world and Olympic records were as follows.

World Record	Snatch	Chen Yanqing (CHN)	111 kg	Doha, Qatar	3 December 2006
World Record	Clean & Jerk	Qiu Hongmei (CHN)	141 kg	Tai'an, China	23 April 2007
World Record	Total	Chen Yanqing (CHN)	251 kg	Doha, Qatar	3 December 2006
Olympic Record	Snatch	Chen Yanqing (CHN)	107 kg	Athens, Greece	16 August 2004
Olympic Record	Clean & Jerk	Chen Yanqing (CHN)	138 kg	Beijing, China	11 August 2008
Olympic Record	Total	Chen Yanqing (CHN)	244 kg	Beijing, China	11 August 2008

== Results ==
Rank	Athlete	Group	Body weight	Snatch (kg)				Clean & Jerk (kg)				Total
Rank	Athlete	Group	Body weight	1	2	3	Result	1	2	3	Result	Total
1st place, gold medalist(s)	Li Xueying (CHN)	A	57.98	~~105~~	105	108	108	133	138	~~144~~	138	246
2nd place, silver medalist(s)	Pimsiri Sirikaew (THA)	A	57.76	100	~~103~~	~~103~~	100	131	136	~~140~~	136	236
3rd place, bronze medalist(s)	Rattikan Gulnoi (THA)	A	57.71	~~98~~	~~100~~	100	100	130	134	~~136~~	134	234
4	Jong Chun-mi (PRK)	A	57.63	101	~~103~~	~~103~~	101	130	~~134~~	~~134~~	130	231
5	Nastassia Novikava (BLR)	A	57.94	103	~~106~~	~~108~~	103	~~127~~	127	~~133~~	127	230
6	Kuo Hsing-chun (TPE)	A	56.95	99	~~101~~	~~102~~	99	129	~~133~~	~~133~~	129	228
7	Alexandra Escobar (ECU)	B	57.48	~~100~~	100	103	103	123	~~127~~	~~127~~	123	226
8	Jackelina Heredia (COL)	A	57.86	98	100	~~101~~	100	~~125~~	~~125~~	125	125	225
9	Romela Begaj (ALB)	A	57.94	101	~~105~~	~~105~~	101	115	~~121~~	~~121~~	115	216
10	Zoe Smith (GBR)	B	57.97	90	~~93~~	~~93~~	90	116	~~121~~	121	121	211
11	Christin Ulrich (GER)	B	57.40	88	91	93	93	110	114	~~116~~	114	207
12	Yang Eun-hye (KOR)	B	57.93	83	~~87~~	87	87	108	113	~~116~~	113	200
13	Bediha Tunadağı (TUR)	B	57.34	84	~~87~~	87	87	103	~~107~~	107	107	194
14	Annie Moniqui (CAN)	B	57.91	~~85~~	85	~~88~~	85	~~105~~	~~105~~	105	105	190
15	Jenly Tegu Wini (SOL)	B	57.43	65	~~69~~	~~69~~	65	90	93	95	95	160
—	Hidilyn Diaz (PHI)	B	57.70	92	~~97~~	97	97	~~118~~	~~118~~	~~118~~	—	—
—	Lina Rivas (COL)	A	57.73	100	~~103~~	103	103	~~120~~	~~120~~	~~120~~	—	—
DQ	Yuliya Kalina (UKR)	A	57.60	101	104	106	106	123	127	129	129	~~235~~
DQ	Boyanka Kostova (AZE)	A	56.93	100	103	105	105	~~124~~	124	128	128	~~233~~

- Yuliya Kalina of Ukraine originally finished third, but was disqualified after she tested positive for dehydrochlormethyltestosterone.
- Boyanka Kostova of Azerbaijan originally finished fifth, but was disqualified after she tested positive for dehydrochloromethyltestosterone and stanozolol.

== New records ==
Snatch	108 kg	Li Xueying (CHN)	OR
Total	246 kg	Li Xueying (CHN)	OR
