= 2003 World Weightlifting Championships – Women's 58 kg =

The 2003 World Weightlifting Championships were held in Vancouver, Canada from 14 November to 22 November. The women's 58 kilograms division was staged on 17 November 2003.

== Schedule ==
Date	Time	Event
17 November 2003	12:30	Group C
17 November 2003	15:00	Group B
17 November 2003	20:00	Group A

== Medalists ==
Event	Gold		Silver		Bronze	
Snatch	Sun Caiyan (CHN)	100.0 kg	Patmawati Abdul Hamid (INA)	97.5 kg	Alexandra Escobar (ECU)	92.5 kg
Clean & Jerk	Sun Caiyan (CHN)	125.0 kg	Patmawati Abdul Hamid (INA)	120.0 kg	Maryse Turcotte (CAN)	120.0 kg
Total	Sun Caiyan (CHN)	225.0 kg	Patmawati Abdul Hamid (INA)	217.5 kg	Aylin Daşdelen (TUR)	210.0 kg

== Records ==
Prior to this competition, the existing world records were as follows.

World Record	Snatch	Wang Li (CHN)	110.0 kg	Bali, Indonesia	10 August 2003
World Record	Clean & Jerk	Sun Caiyan (CHN)	133.0 kg	İzmir, Turkey	28 June 2002
World Record	Total	Wang Li (CHN)	240.0 kg	Bali, Indonesia	10 August 2003

== Results ==
Rank	Athlete	Group	Body weight	Snatch (kg)				Clean & Jerk (kg)				Total
Rank	Athlete	Group	Body weight	1	2	3	Rank	1	2	3	Rank	Total
1st place, gold medalist(s)	Sun Caiyan (CHN)	A	57.48	97.5	~~100.0~~	100.0	1st place, gold medalist(s)	122.5	125.0	~~127.5~~	1st place, gold medalist(s)	225.0
2nd place, silver medalist(s)	Patmawati Abdul Hamid (INA)	A	56.57	90.0	95.0	97.5	2nd place, silver medalist(s)	~~115.0~~	115.0	120.0	2nd place, silver medalist(s)	217.5
3rd place, bronze medalist(s)	Aylin Daşdelen (TUR)	A	57.27	~~92.5~~	92.5	~~97.5~~	4	117.5	~~122.5~~	~~122.5~~	4	210.0
4	Alexandra Escobar (ECU)	A	55.56	~~90.0~~	90.0	92.5	3rd place, bronze medalist(s)	110.0	115.0	~~120.0~~	5	207.5
5	Pak Hyon-suk (PRK)	A	57.13	90.0	~~92.5~~	~~92.5~~	6	115.0	~~120.0~~	~~120.0~~	7	205.0
6	Marina Shainova (RUS)	A	57.41	87.5	90.0	~~92.5~~	11	~~115.0~~	115.0	~~120.0~~	8	205.0
7	Maryse Turcotte (CAN)	B	57.44	85.0	~~90.0~~	~~90.0~~	22	112.5	117.5	120.0	3rd place, bronze medalist(s)	205.0
8	Gretty Lugo (VEN)	B	57.83	~~90.0~~	~~90.0~~	90.0	12	110.0	112.5	115.0	9	205.0
9	Tanti Pratiwi (INA)	A	57.04	87.5	~~95.0~~	~~95.0~~	15	~~115.0~~	115.0	~~120.0~~	6	202.5
10	Franca Gbodo (NGR)	A	56.72	~~87.5~~	~~87.5~~	87.5	14	~~112.5~~	112.5	~~117.5~~	10	200.0
11	Soraya Jiménez (MEX)	A	56.82	90.0	~~92.5~~	~~92.5~~	5	~~110.0~~	~~110.0~~	110.0	11	200.0
12	Silvia Puxeddu (ITA)	B	57.23	87.5	90.0	~~92.5~~	8	~~110.0~~	110.0	~~112.5~~	13	200.0
13	Henrietta Ráki (HUN)	A	57.38	90.0	~~92.5~~	~~92.5~~	10	110.0	~~115.0~~	~~115.0~~	14	200.0
14	Marieta Gotfryd (POL)	B	57.14	~~90.0~~	~~90.0~~	90.0	7	105.0	107.5	~~110.0~~	18	197.5
15	Svitlana Kokhanenko (UKR)	B	57.80	85.0	87.5	~~90.0~~	16	105.0	110.0	~~115.0~~	16	197.5
16	Michaela Breeze (GBR)	B	56.71	87.5	~~90.0~~	~~90.0~~	13	~~107.5~~	~~107.5~~	107.5	17	195.0
17	Mónica Picón (COL)	B	57.02	82.5	85.0	~~87.5~~	19	105.0	~~110.0~~	110.0	12	195.0
18	Prasmita Mangaraj (IND)	B	56.02	82.5	~~85.0~~	85.0	18	~~105.0~~	~~105.0~~	105.0	19	190.0
19	Rusmeris Villar (COL)	B	57.36	82.5	~~85.0~~	85.0	21	105.0	~~110.0~~	~~110.0~~	20	190.0
20	Taeko Okura (JPN)	C	57.39	75.0	80.0	~~82.5~~	26	102.5	107.5	110.0	15	190.0
21	Charikleia Kastritsi (GRE)	B	57.51	~~85.0~~	85.0	~~90.0~~	23	105.0	~~112.5~~	~~112.5~~	21	190.0
22	Solsiris Francisco (PUR)	C	57.81	~~85.0~~	~~85.0~~	85.0	25	~~105.0~~	105.0	~~107.5~~	22	190.0
23	Miel McGerrigle (CAN)	C	57.83	82.5	87.5	~~90.0~~	17	102.5	~~107.5~~	~~107.5~~	23	190.0
24	Abigail Guerrero (ESP)	C	57.34	85.0	~~87.5~~	~~87.5~~	20	100.0	~~105.0~~	~~105.0~~	25	185.0
25	Aksana Zalatarova (BLR)	C	57.90	80.0	~~85.0~~	~~85.0~~	28	95.0	~~100.0~~	100.0	26	180.0
26	Kamilya Bagautdinova (KAZ)	C	57.33	75.0	~~80.0~~	~~80.0~~	29	92.5	100.0	~~105.0~~	24	175.0
27	Larissa Saint-Jacques (FRA)	C	57.45	75.0	80.0	~~82.5~~	27	92.5	~~97.5~~	~~97.5~~	27	172.5
28	Stefania Magliola (ITA)	C	56.50	65.0	70.0	72.5	30	~~75.0~~	~~75.0~~	75.0	28	147.5
—	Emine Bilgin (TUR)	A	56.77	~~90.0~~	~~90.0~~	—	—	—	—	—	—	—
—	Esmat Mansour (EGY)	A	57.24	90.0	~~95.0~~	~~95.0~~	9	—	—	—	—	—
—	Li Feng-ying (TPE)	A	57.42	~~95.0~~	—	—	—	—	—	—	—	—
—	Heidi Kanervisto (FIN)	C	57.61	~~80.0~~	80.0	85.0	24	~~97.5~~	~~97.5~~	~~97.5~~	—	—
