= Weightlifting at the 2012 Summer Olympics =

Coordinates: 51.5075°N 0.0297°E

Weightlifting at the Games of the XXX Olympiad
- Venue: ExCeL London
- Dates: 28 July - 7 August 2012
- Competitors: 260

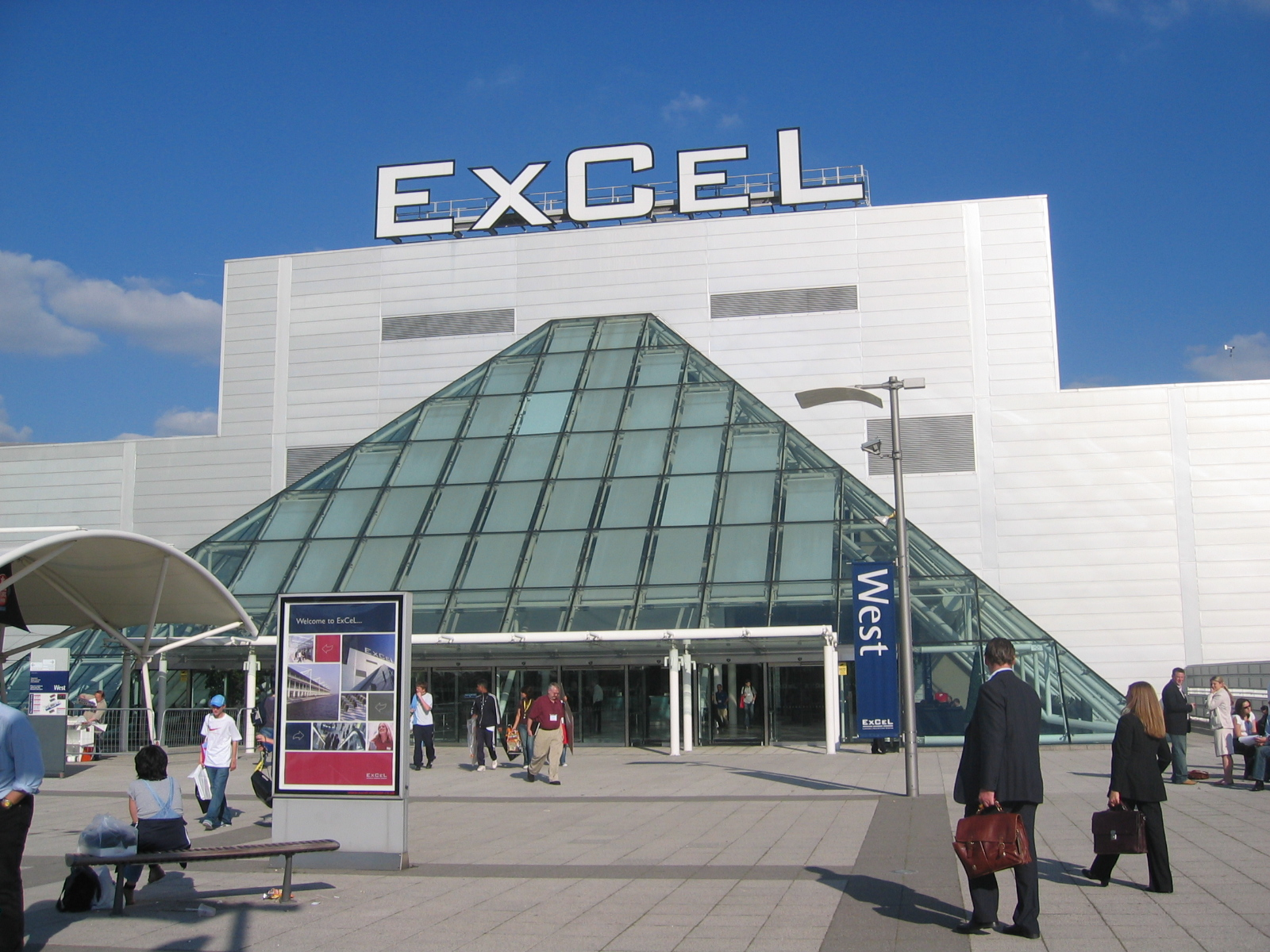
ExCel Exhibition Centre

Weightlifting competitions at the 2012 Summer Olympics in London were held from 28 July to 7 August in the ExCeL venue. Fifteen gold medals were awarded and 260 athletes took part (156 men and 104 women).

== Events ==
15 sets of medals were awarded in the following events:

- 56 kg Men
- 62 kg Men
- 69 kg Men
- 77 kg Men
- 85 kg Men
- 94 kg Men
- 105 kg Men
- +105 kg Men

- 48 kg Women
- 53 kg Women
- 58 kg Women
- 63 kg Women
- 69 kg Women
- 75 kg Women
- +75 kg Women

== Medal summary ==
The results of the 2012 Olympic weightlifting competition have been significantly revised after doping was uncovered through retests of samples from these Games.

=== Medal table ===
Rank	Nation	Gold	Silver	Bronze	Total
1	China	5	2	0	7
2	Iran	3	2	0	5
3	North Korea	3	0	1	4
4	Poland	1	1	1	3
5	Canada	1	0	0	1
5	Chinese Taipei	1	0	0	1
5	Spain	1	0	0	1
8	Indonesia	0	2	1	3
9	South Korea	0	1	2	3
10	Colombia	0	1	1	2
10	Egypt	0	1	1	2
10	Thailand	0	1	1	2
13	Bulgaria	0	1	0	1
13	Japan	0	1	0	1
13	Kazakhstan	0	1	0	1
13	Russia	0	1	0	1
17	Cameroon	0	0	1	1
17	Cuba	0	0	1	1
17	Mexico	0	0	1	1
17	Ukraine	0	0	1	1
17	Uzbekistan	0	0	1	1
17	Vietnam	0	0	1	1
Totals (22 entries)		15	15	14	44

=== Men's events ===
Event	Gold	Silver	Bronze
56 kg^{[a]}	Om Yun-chol; North Korea	Wu Jingbiao; China	Trần Lê Quốc Toàn; Vietnam
62 kg	Kim Un-guk; North Korea	Óscar Figueroa; Colombia	Eko Yuli Irawan; Indonesia
69 kg^{[b]}	Lin Qingfeng; China	Triyatno; Indonesia	Kim Myong-hyok; North Korea
77 kg	Lü Xiaojun; China	Lu Haojie; China	Iván Cambar; Cuba
85 kg^{[c]}	Adrian Zieliński; Poland	Kianoush Rostami; Iran	Tarek Yehia; Egypt
94 kg^{[d]}	Saeid Mohammadpour; Iran	Kim Min-jae; South Korea	Tomasz Zieliński; Poland
105 kg^{[e]}	Navab Nassirshalal; Iran	Bartłomiej Bonk; Poland	Ivan Efremov; Uzbekistan
+105 kg^{[f]}	Behdad Salimi; Iran	Sajjad Anoushiravani; Iran	Jeon Sang-guen; South Korea

=== Women's events ===
Event	Gold	Silver	Bronze
48 kg	Wang Mingjuan; China	Hiromi Miyake; Japan	Ryang Chun-hwa; North Korea
53 kg^{[g]}	Hsu Shu-ching; Chinese Taipei	Citra Febrianti; Indonesia	Iulia Paratova; Ukraine
58 kg^{[h]}	Li Xueying; China	Pimsiri Sirikaew; Thailand	Rattikan Gulnoi; Thailand
63 kg^{[i]}	Christine Girard; Canada	Milka Maneva; Bulgaria	Luz Acosta; Mexico
69 kg^{[j]}	Rim Jong-sim; North Korea	Anna Nurmukhambetova; Kazakhstan	Ubaldina Valoyes; Colombia
75 kg^{[k]}	Lydia Valentín; Spain	Abeer Abdelrahman; Egypt	Madias Nzesso; Cameroon
+75 kg^{[l]}	Zhou Lulu; China	Tatiana Kashirina; Russia	Jang Mi-ran; South Korea

== Notes ==
- ^{Men's 56 kg} Valentin Hristov of Azerbaijan originally won the bronze medal, but was disqualified in 2019 after testing positive for steroids.
- ^{Men's 69 kg} Răzvan Martin of Romania originally won the bronze medal, but was disqualified in 2020 after a retest of his 2012 sample tested positive for steroids.
- ^{Men's 85 kg} Apti Aukhadov of Russia originally won the silver medal, but was disqualified in 2016 after a retest of his 2012 sample tested positive for steroids.
- ^{Men's 94 kg} Ilya Ilyin of Kazakhstan, Aleksandr Ivanov of Russia, and Anatolie Cîrîcu of Moldova originally won the gold, silver and bronze medals, respectively, but were all disqualified in 2016 after retests of their 2012 samples were positive for steroids. Fourth-placed Andrey Demanov of Russia, sixth-placed Intigam Zairov of Azerbaijan, and seventh-placed Almas Uteshov of Kazakhstan were also disqualified for the same reason.
- ^{Men's 105 kg} Oleksiy Torokhtiy of Ukraine originally won the gold medal, and Ruslan Nurudinov of Uzbekistan originally finished fourth, but were both disqualified as retests of their 2012 samples were positive for performance-enhancing drugs.
- ^{Men's +105 kg} Ruslan Albegov of Russia originally won the bronze medal, but was disqualified in 2024 after a doping violation. Fourth-place finisher Irakli Turmanidze of Georgia was also disqualified.
- ^{Women's 53 kg} Zulfiya Chinshanlo of Kazakhstan and Cristina Iovu of Moldova originally won the gold and bronze medals respectively, but were both disqualified in 2016 after testing positive for steroids.
- ^{Women's 58 kg} Yuliya Kalina of Ukraine originally won the bronze medal, but was disqualified in 2016 after a retest of her 2012 sample tested positive for steroids.
- ^{Women's 63 kg} Maiya Maneza of Kazakhstan originally won the gold medal, but was disqualified in 2016 after a retest of her 2012 sample tested positive for stanozolol. Fourth-placed Sibel Şimşek of Turkey was also disqualified for the same reason. On 5 April 2017, original silver medalist Svetlana Tsarukaeva of Russia was also disqualified for the same reason.
- ^{Women's 69 kg} Maryna Shkermankova of Belarus originally won the bronze medal, but was disqualified in 2016 after a retest of her 2012 sample was positive for steroids. Fourth-placed Dzina Sazanavets of Belarus was also disqualified for the same reason. Roxana Cocoș of Romania originally won the silver medal, but was disqualified in 2020 after a failed retest of her sample from 2012 tested positive for steroids.
- ^{Women's 75 kg} Svetlana Podobedova of Kazakhstan, Natalya Zabolotnaya of Russia, and Iryna Kulesha of Belarus originally won the gold, silver, and bronze medals respectively, but were all disqualified in 2016 after retests of their 2012 samples were positive for steroids.
- ^{Women's +75 kg} Hripsime Khurshudyan of Armenia originally won the bronze medal, but was disqualified in 2016 after a retest of her 2012 sample was positive for steroids.

== Olympic and world records broken ==
=== Women ===
Event	Date	Round	Name	Nationality	Weight	Record	Day
Olympics – Women's 58 kg	30 July	Snatch	Li Xueying	China	108 kg	OR	3
Olympics – Women's 58 kg	30 July	Total	Li Xueying	China	246 kg	OR	3
Olympics – Women's +75 kg	5 August	Snatch	Tatiana Kashirina	Russia	151 kg	WR	9
Olympics – Women's +75 kg	5 August	Clean & Jerk	Zhou Lulu	China	187 kg	OR	9
Olympics – Women's +75 kg	5 August	Total	Zhou Lulu	China	333 kg	WR	9

=== Men ===
Event	Date	Round	Name	Nationality	Weight	Record	Day
Olympics – Men's 56 kg	29 July	Clean and jerk	Om Yun-Chol	North Korea	168 kg	OR	2
Olympics – Men's 62 kg	30 July	Snatch	Kim Un-Guk	North Korea	153 kg	OR	3
Olympics – Men's 62 kg	30 July	Total	Kim Un-Guk	North Korea	327 kg	WR	3
Olympics – Men's 62 kg	30 July	Clean and jerk	Óscar Figueroa	Colombia	177 kg	OR	3
Olympics – Men's 77 kg	1 August	Snatch	Lü Xiaojun	China	175 kg	WR	5
Olympics – Men's 77 kg	1 August	Total	Lü Xiaojun	China	379 kg	WR	5
