= 2002 World Weightlifting Championships – Women's 58 kg =

The 2002 World Weightlifting Championships were held in Warsaw, Poland from 19 November to 26 November. The women's 58 kilograms division was staged on 20 November 2002.

== Schedule ==
Date	Time	Event
20 November 2002	12:00	Group B
20 November 2002	20:00	Group A

== Medalists ==
Event	Gold		Silver		Bronze	
Snatch	Song Zhijuan (CHN)	105.0 kg	Charikleia Kastritsi (GRE)	97.5 kg	Emine Bilgin (TUR)	95.0 kg
Clean & Jerk	Song Zhijuan (CHN)	125.0 kg	Wandee Kameaim (THA)	120.0 kg	Maryse Turcotte (CAN)	117.5 kg
Total	Song Zhijuan (CHN)	230.0 kg	Wandee Kameaim (THA)	212.5 kg	Charikleia Kastritsi (GRE)	210.0 kg

== Records ==
Prior to this competition, the existing world records were as follows.

World Record	Snatch	Sun Caiyan (CHN)	105.5 kg	İzmir, Turkey	28 June 2002
World Record	Clean & Jerk	Sun Caiyan (CHN)	133.0 kg	İzmir, Turkey	28 June 2002
World Record	Total	Sun Caiyan (CHN)	237.5 kg	İzmir, Turkey	28 June 2002

== Results ==
Rank	Athlete	Group	Body weight	Snatch (kg)				Clean & Jerk (kg)				Total
Rank	Athlete	Group	Body weight	1	2	3	Rank	1	2	3	Rank	Total
1st place, gold medalist(s)	Song Zhijuan (CHN)	A	57.70	100.0	105.0	~~107.5~~	1st place, gold medalist(s)	120.0	~~122.5~~	125.0	1st place, gold medalist(s)	230.0
2nd place, silver medalist(s)	Wandee Kameaim (THA)	A	57.80	87.5	~~92.5~~	92.5	7	117.5	120.0	~~125.0~~	2nd place, silver medalist(s)	212.5
3rd place, bronze medalist(s)	Charikleia Kastritsi (GRE)	A	57.55	90.0	95.0	97.5	2nd place, silver medalist(s)	107.5	112.5	~~115.0~~	7	210.0
4	Henrietta Ráki (HUN)	A	57.45	~~90.0~~	90.0	92.5	6	110.0	115.0	~~117.5~~	4	207.5
5	Michaela Breeze (GBR)	B	57.20	87.5	92.5	~~95.0~~	4	~~107.5~~	107.5	112.5	6	205.0
6	Maryse Turcotte (CAN)	A	57.45	85.0	~~87.5~~	87.5	10	112.5	~~117.5~~	117.5	3rd place, bronze medalist(s)	205.0
7	Neli Yankova (BUL)	A	56.25	87.5	90.0	~~92.5~~	8	112.5	~~120.0~~	~~120.0~~	5	202.5
8	Marieta Gotfryd (POL)	A	57.25	~~92.5~~	92.5	~~95.0~~	5	105.0	~~110.0~~	110.0	8	202.5
9	Soraya Jiménez (MEX)	A	57.55	87.5	90.0	~~92.5~~	9	110.0	~~115.0~~	~~115.0~~	9	200.0
10	Svitlana Kokhanenko (UKR)	A	57.75	80.0	85.0	87.5	11	105.0	~~110.0~~	~~110.0~~	11	192.5
11	Silvia Puxeddu (ITA)	A	57.60	85.0	~~90.0~~	~~90.0~~	12	105.0	~~110.0~~	~~110.0~~	10	190.0
12	Ling I-hua (TPE)	B	54.00	75.0	80.0	~~82.5~~	13	100.0	~~105.0~~	~~105.0~~	12	180.0
13	Abigail Guerrero (ESP)	B	57.55	80.0	~~85.0~~	~~85.0~~	14	97.5	100.0	~~102.5~~	13	180.0
14	Yelena Sukhina (KAZ)	B	57.75	75.0	~~80.0~~	80.0	15	95.0	~~100.0~~	100.0	15	180.0
15	Carissa Gordon (USA)	B	57.80	~~80.0~~	80.0	~~82.5~~	16	100.0	~~105.0~~	~~105.0~~	16	180.0
16	Ouahiba Belghandi (ALG)	B	57.85	~~77.5~~	~~77.5~~	77.5	17	95.0	100.0	~~102.5~~	17	177.5
17	Aksana Zalatarova (BLR)	B	57.95	~~75.0~~	~~75.0~~	75.0	20	90.0	95.0	100.0	18	175.0
18	Mari Nakaga (JPN)	B	57.60	75.0	~~80.0~~	~~80.0~~	19	97.5	~~102.5~~	~~102.5~~	20	172.5
19	Jacquelynn Berube (USA)	B	57.45	~~70.0~~	70.0	~~77.5~~	21	92.5	~~97.5~~	97.5	19	167.5
20	Lisbeth Østergaard (DEN)	B	56.10	75.0	~~77.5~~	~~77.5~~	18	90.0	~~95.0~~	~~95.0~~	22	165.0
21	Ip Wing Yuk (HKG)	B	56.85	30.0	~~35.0~~	35.0	22	35.0	~~45.0~~	45.0	23	80.0
—	Emine Bilgin (TUR)	A	56.95	90.0	92.5	95.0	3rd place, bronze medalist(s)	~~112.5~~	~~112.5~~	~~112.5~~	—	—
—	Mariya Vidlyvana (UKR)	B	57.70	~~82.5~~	~~82.5~~	~~85.0~~	—	100.0	~~105.0~~	~~105.0~~	14	—
—	Heidi Kanervisto (FIN)	B	57.95	~~85.0~~	~~85.0~~	~~85.0~~	—	97.5	~~102.5~~	—	21	—
