= Weightlifting at the 2008 Summer Olympics – Women's 58 kg =

Women's 58 kg weightlifting event: August 11 competition

Women's 58 kg at the Games of the XXIX Olympiad
- Venue: Beihang University Gymnasium
- Date: 11 August 2008
- Competitors: 12 from 11 nations

Medalists
1st place, gold medalist(s)		Chen Yanqing	China
2nd place, silver medalist(s)		O Jong-ae	North Korea
3rd place, bronze medalist(s)		Wandee Kameaim	Thailand

The women's 58 kilograms weightlifting event was the third women's event at the weightlifting competition, with competitors limited to a maximum of 58 kilograms of body mass. The whole competition took place on August 11, but was divided in two parts due to the number of competitors. Group B weightlifters competed at 12:30, and Group A, at 15:30. This event was the fourth weightlifting event to conclude.

Each lifter performed in both the snatch and clean and jerk lifts, with the final score being the sum of the lifter's best result in each. The athlete received three attempts in each of the two lifts; the score for the lift was the heaviest weight successfully lifted.

== Schedule ==
All times are China Standard Time (UTC+08:00)

Date	Time	Event
11 August 2008	15:30	Group A

== Records ==
Prior to this competition, the existing world and Olympic records were as follows.

World Record	Snatch	Chen Yanqing (CHN)	111 kg	Doha, Qatar	3 December 2006
World Record	Clean & Jerk	Qiu Hongmei (CHN)	141 kg	Tai'an, China	23 April 2007
World Record	Total	Chen Yanqing (CHN)	251 kg	Doha, Qatar	3 December 2006
Olympic Record	Snatch	Chen Yanqing (CHN)	107 kg	Athens, Greece	16 August 2004
Olympic Record	Clean & Jerk	Olympic Standard	130 kg	—	1 January 1997
Olympic Record	Total	Chen Yanqing (CHN)	237 kg	Athens, Greece	16 August 2004

== Results ==
Rank	Athlete	Group	Body weight	Snatch (kg)				Clean & Jerk (kg)				Total
Rank	Athlete	Group	Body weight	1	2	3	Result	1	2	3	Result	Total
1st place, gold medalist(s)	Chen Yanqing (CHN)	A	57.66	100	103	106	106	130	132	138	138	244
2nd place, silver medalist(s)	O Jong-ae (PRK)	A	57.15	95	~~98~~	~~98~~	95	125	~~131~~	131	131	226
3rd place, bronze medalist(s)	Wandee Kameaim (THA)	A	57.25	95	98	~~100~~	98	125	128	~~129~~	128	226
4	Alexandra Escobar (ECU)	A	57.82	~~96~~	96	99	99	120	124	~~127~~	124	223
5	Romela Begaj (ALB)	A	57.56	95	98	~~100~~	98	110	115	118	118	216
6	Aleksandra Klejnowska (POL)	A	57.66	~~92~~	92	95	95	120	~~125~~	~~126~~	120	215
7	Roxana Cocoș (ROU)	A	57.88	82	86	89	89	111	~~115~~	115	115	204
8	Geralee Vega (PUR)	A	57.51	~~90~~	~~90~~	90	90	112	~~115~~	~~116~~	112	202
9	Marieta Gotfryd (POL)	A	57.70	90	~~95~~	~~95~~	90	105	110	~~113~~	110	200
10	Hidilyn Diaz (PHI)	A	56.28	80	85	~~90~~	85	~~102~~	102	107	107	192
11	Wendy Hale (SOL)	A	57.15	74	78	~~82~~	78	95	~~100~~	~~100~~	95	173
DQ	Marina Shainova (RUS)	A	57.93	95	~~98~~	98	98	125	~~128~~	129	129	~~227~~

- Marina Shainova of Russia originally won the silver medal, but she was disqualified after a re-analysis of her 2008 sample tested positive for steroids.

== New records ==
Clean & Jerk	131 kg	O Jong-ae (PRK)	OR
Clean & Jerk	132 kg	Chen Yanqing (CHN)	OR
Clean & Jerk	138 kg	Chen Yanqing (CHN)	OR
Total	238 kg	Chen Yanqing (CHN)	OR
Total	244 kg	Chen Yanqing (CHN)	OR
