= Weightlifting at the 2000 Summer Olympics – Women's 58 kg =

Weightlifting at the Olympics

Women's 58 kg at the Games of the XXVII Olympiad
- Venue: Sydney Convention and Exhibition Centre
- Date: 18 September 2000
- Competitors: 17 from 16 nations

Medalists
1st place, gold medalist(s)		Soraya Jiménez	Mexico
2nd place, silver medalist(s)		Ri Song-hui	North Korea
3rd place, bronze medalist(s)		Khassaraporn Suta	Thailand

The women's 58 kilograms weightlifting event at the 2000 Summer Olympics in Sydney, Australia took place at the Sydney Convention and Exhibition Centre on September 18.

Total score was the sum of the lifter's best result in each of the snatch and the clean and jerk, with three lifts allowed for each lift. In case of a tie, the lighter lifter won; if still tied, the lifter who took the fewest attempts to achieve the total score won. Lifters without a valid snatch score did not perform the clean and jerk.

== Schedule ==
All times are Australian Eastern Time (UTC+10:00)

Date	Time	Event
18 September 2000	18:30	Group A

== Records ==
Prior to this competition, the existing world and Olympic records were as follows.

World Record	Snatch	Chen Yanqing (CHN)	105.0 kg	Athens, Greece	22 November 1999
World Record	Clean & Jerk	Ri Song-hui (PRK)	131.5 kg	Osaka, Japan	3 May 2000
World Record	Total	Chen Yanqing (CHN)	235.0 kg	Athens, Greece	22 November 1999
Olympic Record	Snatch	Olympic Standard	105.0 kg	—	1 January 1997
Olympic Record	Clean & Jerk	Olympic Standard	130.0 kg	—	1 January 1997
Olympic Record	Total	Olympic Standard	235.0 kg	—	1 January 1997

== Results ==
Rank	Athlete	Group	Body weight	Snatch (kg)				Clean & Jerk (kg)				Total
Rank	Athlete	Group	Body weight	1	2	3	Result	1	2	3	Result	Total
1st place, gold medalist(s)	Soraya Jiménez (MEX)	A	56.92	90.0	92.5	95.0	95.0	117.5	122.5	127.5	127.5	222.5
2nd place, silver medalist(s)	Ri Song-hui (PRK)	A	53.90	95.0	97.5	—	97.5	120.0	~~122.5~~	122.5	122.5	220.0
3rd place, bronze medalist(s)	Khassaraporn Suta (THA)	A	56.84	90.0	92.5	~~95.0~~	92.5	~~117.5~~	117.5	~~122.5~~	117.5	210.0
4	Maryse Turcotte (CAN)	A	57.28	87.5	~~90.0~~	90.0	90.0	115.0	~~122.5~~	~~122.5~~	115.0	205.0
5	Aleksandra Klejnowska (POL)	A	57.16	85.0	90.0	~~92.5~~	90.0	~~112.5~~	~~112.5~~	112.5	112.5	202.5
6	Khin Moe Nwe (MYA)	A	57.12	90.0	~~92.5~~	~~92.5~~	90.0	~~110.0~~	~~110.0~~	110.0	110.0	200.0
7	Nataliya Skakun (UKR)	A	57.66	80.0	85.0	~~87.5~~	85.0	105.0	110.0	112.5	112.5	197.5
8	Hanna Batsiushka (BLR)	A	57.68	85.0	~~90.0~~	90.0	90.0	102.5	107.5	~~112.5~~	107.5	197.5
9	Dagmar Daneková (SVK)	A	56.74	~~82.5~~	82.5	~~85.0~~	82.5	100.0	105.0	—	105.0	187.5
10	Natasha Barker (AUS)	A	57.52	~~77.5~~	77.5	~~82.5~~	77.5	97.5	102.5	~~105.0~~	102.5	180.0
11	Ingeborg Marx (BEL)	A	57.48	72.5	77.5	~~82.5~~	77.5	~~100.0~~	100.0	~~105.0~~	100.0	177.5
12	Meagan Warthold (AUS)	A	57.14	75.0	~~80.0~~	~~80.0~~	75.0	95.0	100.0	~~102.5~~	100.0	175.0
13	Sophia Vandagne (SEY)	A	57.14	67.5	~~72.5~~	72.5	72.5	87.5	~~92.5~~	~~92.5~~	87.5	160.0
14	Leila Lassouani (ALG)	A	57.60	60.0	~~65.0~~	~~67.5~~	60.0	82.5	~~87.5~~	~~87.5~~	82.5	142.5
15	Melissa Fejeran (GUM)	A	57.80	50.0	55.0	57.5	57.5	70.0	75.0	~~77.5~~	75.0	132.5
—	Evelyn Ebhomien (NGR)	A	56.86	87.5	92.5	~~95.0~~	92.5	~~117.5~~	~~117.5~~	~~117.5~~	—	—
—	Yuriko Takahashi (JPN)	A	57.32	80.0	85.0	~~87.5~~	85.0	~~110.0~~	~~110.0~~	~~112.5~~	—	—
