= 1999 World Weightlifting Championships – Women's 58 kg =

The Women's Lightweight Weightlifting Event (58 kg) is the third women's weight class event at the weightlifting competition, limited to competitors with a maximum of 58 kilograms of body mass. The competition at the 1999 World Weightlifting Championships took place in Athens, Greece on 22 November 1999.

Each lifter performed in both the snatch and clean and jerk lifts, with the final score being the sum of the lifter's best result in each. The athlete received three attempts in each of the two lifts; the score for the lift was the heaviest weight successfully lifted.

== Medalists ==
Event	Gold		Silver		Bronze	
Snatch	Chen Yanqing (CHN)	105.0 kg	Ri Song-hui (PRK)	100.0 kg	Kuo Ping-chun (TPE)	97.5 kg
Clean & Jerk	Ri Song-hui (PRK)	130.0 kg	Chen Yanqing (CHN)	130.0 kg	Kuo Ping-chun (TPE)	125.0 kg
Total	Chen Yanqing (CHN)	235.0 kg	Ri Song-hui (PRK)	230.0 kg	Kuo Ping-chun (TPE)	222.5 kg

== Records ==
Prior to this competition, the existing world records were as follows.

World Record	Snatch	Chen Yanqing (CHN)	102.5 kg	Savannah, United States	4 July 1999
World Record	Clean & Jerk	Chen Yanqing (CHN)	130.0 kg	Savannah, United States	4 July 1999
World Record	Total	Chen Yanqing (CHN)	232.5 kg	Savannah, United States	4 July 1999

== Results ==
Rank	Athlete	Body weight	Snatch (kg)				Clean & Jerk (kg)				Total
Rank	Athlete	Body weight	1	2	3	Rank	1	2	3	Rank	Total
1st place, gold medalist(s)	Chen Yanqing (CHN)	57.47	~~100.0~~	100.0	105.0	1st place, gold medalist(s)	125.0	130.0	~~135.0~~	2nd place, silver medalist(s)	235.0
2nd place, silver medalist(s)	Ri Song-hui (PRK)	55.93	95.0	97.5	100.0	2nd place, silver medalist(s)	125.0	131.0	~~135.0~~	1st place, gold medalist(s)	230.0
3rd place, bronze medalist(s)	Kuo Ping-chun (TPE)	57.33	92.5	95.0	97.5	3rd place, bronze medalist(s)	120.0	122.5	125.0	3rd place, bronze medalist(s)	222.5
4	Khassaraporn Suta (THA)	57.48	87.5	92.5	~~97.5~~	4	~~117.5~~	117.5	125.0	4	217.5
5	Neli Yankova (BUL)	56.70	85.0	90.0	~~92.5~~	5	110.0	115.0	~~120.0~~	6	205.0
6	Maryse Turcotte (CAN)	57.45	~~85.0~~	85.0	~~90.0~~	10	115.0	117.5	~~120.0~~	5	202.5
7	Khin Moe Nwe (MYA)	57.20	87.5	90.0	~~92.5~~	6	~~110.0~~	110.0	~~115.0~~	8	200.0
8	Soraya Jiménez (MEX)	57.30	85.0	~~87.5~~	~~87.5~~	8	107.5	~~112.5~~	112.5	7	197.5
9	Evelyn Ebhomien (NGR)	56.38	80.0	85.0	~~87.5~~	7	105.0	~~110.0~~	~~110.0~~	11	190.0
10	Ingeborg Marx (BEL)	57.77	75.0	80.0	~~85.0~~	18	105.0	110.0	~~115.0~~	9	190.0
11	Nataliya Skakun (UKR)	57.12	75.0	80.0	82.5	13	95.0	100.0	105.0	12	187.5
12	Dagmar Daneková (SVK)	57.30	80.0	85.0	~~87.5~~	9	102.5	~~107.5~~	~~107.5~~	17	187.5
13	Melanie Kosoff-Roach (USA)	57.08	~~72.5~~	72.5	77.5	21	100.0	105.0	107.5	10	185.0
14	Liliana García (VEN)	57.20	~~80.0~~	80.0	~~85.0~~	17	105.0	~~107.5~~	~~107.5~~	13	185.0
15	Michaela Breeze (GBR)	57.51	80.0	82.5	~~85.0~~	14	100.0	102.5	~~105.0~~	18	185.0
16	Gabriella Máthé (HUN)	57.85	77.5	82.5	85.0	11	~~100.0~~	100.0	~~102.5~~	24	185.0
17	Rungarun Paljai (THA)	57.63	82.5	~~87.5~~	~~87.5~~	16	100.0	~~105.0~~	~~105.0~~	20	182.5
18	Lilia Musakaeva (RUS)	57.98	72.5	~~77.5~~	77.5	24	100.0	105.0	~~107.5~~	14	182.5
19	Yuriko Takahashi (JPN)	55.18	77.5	~~82.5~~	~~82.5~~	19	102.5	~~107.5~~	~~107.5~~	15	180.0
20	Aleksandra Klejnowska (POL)	56.80	72.5	77.5	~~80.0~~	20	95.0	100.0	102.5	16	180.0
21	Tarana Abbasova (AZE)	57.01	75.0	80.0	82.5	12	97.5	~~102.5~~	~~102.5~~	25	180.0
22	Ingrid Fèvre (FRA)	57.62	~~82.5~~	82.5	~~85.0~~	15	95.0	~~100.0~~	~~100.0~~	26	177.5
23	Souad Dinar (FRA)	57.65	72.5	75.0	77.5	22	100.0	~~105.0~~	~~105.0~~	21	177.5
24	Natasha Barker (AUS)	57.82	72.5	77.5	~~80.0~~	23	92.5	97.5	100.0	23	177.5
25	Krishna Kumari (IND)	57.98	~~75.0~~	75.0	~~80.0~~	28	95.0	102.5	~~107.5~~	19	177.5
26	Siata Dandukova (KAZ)	57.75	67.5	72.5	75.0	25	87.5	95.0	~~97.5~~	27	170.0
27	Namkhaidorjiin Bayarmaa (MGL)	57.81	70.0	~~75.0~~	~~75.0~~	32	95.0	~~100.0~~	100.0	22	170.0
28	Nancy Niro (CAN)	57.94	70.0	75.0	~~77.5~~	26	87.5	92.5	~~95.0~~	28	167.5
29	Patricia Sosa (ESA)	57.98	70.0	75.0	~~77.5~~	27	92.5	~~97.5~~	~~97.5~~	29	167.5
30	Konstantina Misirli (GRE)	57.61	67.5	70.0	72.5	29	85.0	90.0	~~92.5~~	30	162.5
31	Sónia Ramalho (POR)	57.97	67.5	~~70.0~~	70.0	34	87.5	90.0	~~92.5~~	31	160.0
32	Marie Korčiánová (CZE)	57.47	~~65.0~~	65.0	70.0	31	~~85.0~~	85.0	~~90.0~~	32	155.0
33	Heather Allison (GBR)	57.54	62.5	65.0	67.5	35	77.5	80.0	82.5	33	150.0
34	Anja Bærentsen (DEN)	57.92	65.0	~~70.0~~	~~70.0~~	38	80.0	82.5	~~85.0~~	34	147.5
35	Tatyana Koshevnikova (KAZ)	57.80	60.0	65.0	~~70.0~~	36	75.0	80.0	~~85.0~~	35	145.0
36	Dana Matejová (SVK)	57.85	60.0	65.0	~~70.0~~	37	80.0	~~85.0~~	~~85.0~~	36	145.0
37	Anita Henriksen (DEN)	57.20	57.5	~~60.0~~	60.0	39	~~72.5~~	72.5	~~77.5~~	38	132.5
38	Liat Fridman (ISR)	57.42	52.5	~~57.5~~	~~57.5~~	40	62.5	~~67.5~~	~~67.5~~	39	115.0
39	Rosien Lally (NED)	57.07	40.0	42.5	~~45.0~~	41	45.0	50.0	~~52.5~~	40	92.5
—	Isabella Aconiti (ITA)	57.80	72.5	~~77.5~~	~~77.5~~	30	~~95.0~~	~~95.0~~	~~95.0~~	—	—
—	Sabina Rzayeva (AZE)	57.95	~~70.0~~	~~70.0~~	70.0	33	~~90.0~~	~~90.0~~	~~90.0~~	—	—
—	Leila Lassouani (ALG)	57.96	~~57.5~~	~~60.0~~	~~60.0~~	—	77.5	~~82.5~~	~~82.5~~	37	—
—	Teresa van der Stoep (NED)	57.96	—	—	—	—	—	—	—	—	—

== New records ==
Snatch	105.0 kg	Chen Yanqing (CHN)	WR
Clean & Jerk	131.0 kg	Ri Song-hui (PRK)	WR
Total	235.0 kg	Chen Yanqing (CHN)	WR
