= 1998 World Weightlifting Championships – Women's 58 kg =

The 1998 World Weightlifting Championships were held in Lahti, Finland from November 7 to November 15. The women's competition in the lightweight (58 kg) division was staged on 11 November 1998.

== Medalists ==
Event	Gold		Silver		Bronze	
Snatch	Kuo Ping-chun (TPE)	92.5 kg	Song Zhijuan (CHN)	92.5 kg	Neli Yankova (BUL)	100.0 kg
Clean & Jerk	Kuo Ping-chun (TPE)	115.0 kg	Maryse Turcotte (CAN)	115.0 kg	Song Zhijuan (CHN)	115.0 kg
Total	Kuo Ping-chun (TPE)	207.5 kg	Song Zhijuan (CHN)	207.5 kg	Neli Yankova (BUL)	200.0 kg

== Records ==
Prior to this competition, the existing world records were as follows.

World Record	Snatch	Chen Yanqing (CHN)	97.5 kg	Ramat Gan, Israel	24 April 1998
World Record	Clean & Jerk	Xiu Xiongying (CHN)	123.0 kg	Sofia, Bulgaria	20 May 1998
World Record	Total	Chen Yanqing (CHN)	220.0 kg	Ramat Gan, Israel	24 April 1998

== Results ==
Rank	Athlete	Body weight	Snatch (kg)				Clean & Jerk (kg)				Total
Rank	Athlete	Body weight	1	2	3	Rank	1	2	3	Rank	Total
1st place, gold medalist(s)	Kuo Ping-chun (TPE)	57.00	87.5	90.0	92.5	1st place, gold medalist(s)	110.0	112.5	115.0	1st place, gold medalist(s)	207.5
2nd place, silver medalist(s)	Song Zhijuan (CHN)	57.62	92.5	~~98.0~~	~~98.0~~	2nd place, silver medalist(s)	112.5	115.0	~~117.5~~	3rd place, bronze medalist(s)	207.5
3rd place, bronze medalist(s)	Neli Yankova (BUL)	56.40	82.5	87.5	~~90.0~~	3rd place, bronze medalist(s)	107.5	~~112.5~~	112.5	4	200.0
4	Maryse Turcotte (CAN)	57.04	~~82.5~~	82.5	85.0	5	112.5	115.0	~~117.5~~	2nd place, silver medalist(s)	200.0
5	Maria Christoforidou (GRE)	57.18	80.0	85.0	~~87.5~~	6	100.0	~~105.0~~	105.0	5	190.0
6	Dominika Misterska (POL)	57.54	80.0	~~85.0~~	~~85.0~~	7	~~105.0~~	105.0	~~110.0~~	6	185.0
7	Ingrid Fèvre (FRA)	57.58	77.5	80.0	~~82.5~~	8	95.0	97.5	~~100.0~~	8	177.5
8	Liliana García (VEN)	57.74	~~75.0~~	~~75.0~~	75.0	10	100.0	~~105.0~~	~~105.0~~	7	175.0
9	Marie Korčiánová (CZE)	57.68	~~70.0~~	70.0	72.5	13	90.0	95.0	~~97.5~~	9	167.5
10	Marieta Gotfryd (POL)	57.07	~~75.0~~	~~75.0~~	75.0	9	90.0	~~95.0~~	~~95.0~~	10	165.0
11	Teresa van der Stoep (NED)	57.31	~~70.0~~	70.0	72.5	11	87.5	90.0	~~92.5~~	11	162.5
12	Michaela Breeze (GBR)	57.35	70.0	~~75.0~~	~~75.0~~	15	~~90.0~~	90.0	~~95.0~~	12	160.0
13	Soraya Jiménez (MEX)	57.62	70.0	72.5	~~75.0~~	12	~~80.0~~	80.0	85.0	14	157.5
14	Heidi Kanervisto (FIN)	57.97	67.5	70.0	72.5	14	82.5	85.0	~~87.5~~	16	157.5
15	Nita Uera (NRU)	57.46	~~60.0~~	60.0	65.0	17	82.5	87.5	~~92.5~~	13	152.5
16	Tuija Malinen (FIN)	57.66	~~65.0~~	67.5	~~70.0~~	16	80.0	85.0	~~87.5~~	15	152.5
—	Miel McGerrigle (CAN)	57.38	~~82.5~~	82.5	87.5	4	~~107.5~~	~~107.5~~	~~107.5~~	—	—
