= Weightlifting at the 2014 Asian Games – Women's 58 kg =

2014 weightlifting championship

Women's 58 kg at the 2014 Asian Games
- Venue: Moonlight Festival Garden Venue
- Date: 22 September 2014
- Competitors: 11 from 10 nations

Medalists
gold medal	Ri Jong-hwa	North Korea
silver medal	Wang Shuai	China
bronze medal	Rattikan Gulnoi	Thailand

The women's 58 kilograms event at the 2014 Asian Games took place on 22 September 2014 at Moonlight Festival Garden Weightlifting Venue.

== Schedule ==
All times are Korea Standard Time (UTC+09:00)

Date	Time	Event
Monday, 22 September 2014	16:00	Group A

== Records ==
Prior to this competition, the existing world, Asian and Games records were as follows.

World Record	Snatch	Chen Yanqing (CHN)	111 kg	Doha, Qatar	3 December 2006
World Record	Clean & Jerk	Qiu Hongmei (CHN)	141 kg	Tai'an, China	23 April 2007
World Record	Total	Chen Yanqing (CHN)	251 kg	Doha, Qatar	3 December 2006
Asian Record	Snatch	Chen Yanqing (CHN)	111 kg	Doha, Qatar	3 December 2006
Asian Record	Clean & Jerk	Qiu Hongmei (CHN)	141 kg	Tai'an, China	23 April 2007
Asian Record	Total	Chen Yanqing (CHN)	251 kg	Doha, Qatar	3 December 2006
Games Record	Snatch	Chen Yanqing (CHN)	111 kg	Doha, Qatar	3 December 2006
Games Record	Clean & Jerk	Chen Yanqing (CHN)	140 kg	Doha, Qatar	3 December 2006
Games Record	Total	Chen Yanqing (CHN)	251 kg	Doha, Qatar	3 December 2006

== Results ==
Legend

- NM — No mark

Rank	Athlete	Group	Body weight	Snatch (kg)				Clean & Jerk (kg)				Total
Rank	Athlete	Group	Body weight	1	2	3	Result	1	2	3	Result	Total
1st place, gold medalist(s)	Ri Jong-hwa (PRK)	A	57.60	98	102	~~105~~	102	128	134	~~137~~	134	236
2nd place, silver medalist(s)	Wang Shuai (CHN)	A	57.52	105	109	~~111~~	109	123	126	~~128~~	126	235
3rd place, bronze medalist(s)	Rattikan Gulnoi (THA)	A	57.56	95	~~98~~	98	98	120	124	~~132~~	124	222
4	Kuo Hsing-chun (TPE)	A	57.87	~~95~~	95	~~98~~	95	120	124	~~128~~	124	219
5	Mikiko Ando (JPN)	A	57.62	87	90	~~92~~	90	117	120	122	122	212
6	Farangiz Shomurodova (UZB)	A	57.38	80	83	85	85	100	103	~~106~~	103	188
7	Seo Jeong-mi (KOR)	A	57.60	85	~~90~~	~~91~~	85	103	~~108~~	~~110~~	103	188
8	Saule Saduakassova (KAZ)	A	56.22	70	75	80	80	90	95	100	100	180
9	Win Win Aye (MYA)	A	55.94	65	~~72~~	72	72	88	92	95	95	167
10	Adyaakhüügiin Otgonjargal (MGL)	A	57.87	60	65	~~69~~	65	80	85	~~87~~	85	150
—	Batjargalyn Densmaa (MGL)	A	57.68	~~68~~	~~68~~	~~68~~	—	—	—	—	—	NM
