= Siripuch Gulnoi =

Thai weightlifter

Siripuch Gulnoi BBh
Personal information
- Nickname: Pooklook (ปุ๊กลุ๊ก)
- Born: 17 July 1993 (age 32) Mueang Surin District, Surin Province
- Height: 1.57 m (5 ft 2 in)
- Weight: 63 kg (139 lb)

Sport
- Country: Thailand
- Sport: Weightlifting
- Event: Women's 63 kg
Medal record
Olympic Games
Bronze medal – third place	2012 London	–58 kg
Asian Games
Bronze medal – third place	2014 Incheon	58 kg
Asian Championships
Bronze medal – third place	2012 Pyeongtaek	63kg

Siripuch Gulnoi (Thai: ศิริภุช กุลน้อย, born 17 July 1993), formerly Rattikan Gulnoi (รัตติกาล กุลน้อย), is a Thai weightlifter. She competed at the 2012 Summer Olympics in the women's 58 kg. She set personal bests in both the clean and jerk and the snatch, achieving 100 kg and 134 kg respectively. She originally finished fourth, but was promoted to third and won the bronze medal after Yuliya Kalina was disqualified.

In January 2020, a documentary on systemic doping in international weightlifting by the German broadcaster ARD featured a hidden camera interview with Gulnoi, where she admitted to having continuously doped since the age of 18, including ahead of the 2012 Summer Olympics. Bossaba Yodbangtoey, the head of the Thai Amateur Weightlifting Association, stated Gulnoi exaggerated the extent of doping practices in Thai weightlifting.
