= Eun-hye =

- Hangul: 은혜
- RR: Eunhye
- MR: Ŭnhye
- IPA: [ɯnhe]

Eun-hye, also spelled Eun-hae or Eun-hay, is a Korean given name.

People with this name include:

== Entertainers ==
- Park Eun-hye (born 1978), South Korean actress
- Ivy (singer) (born Park Eun-hye, 1982), South Korean singer
- Yoon Eun-hye (born 1984), South Korean actress and singer
- Gil Eun-hye (born 1988), South Korean actress

== Sportspeople ==
- Bae Eun-hye (born 1982), South Korean judo practitioner
- Kim Eun-hye (born 1987), South Korean sport shooter
- Yang Eun-hye (born 1987), South Korean weightlifter
- Jung Eun-hea (born 1989), South Korean sport shooter

== Other ==
- Kim Eun-hye (born 1971), South Korean politician
- Lee Eun-hye, alias of Yaeko Taguchi (born 1955), Japanese woman abducted by North Korea
- Yoo Eun-hae (born 1962), South Korean politician

== See also ==
- List of Korean given names
