= Weightlifting at the 2004 Summer Olympics – Women's 58 kg =

Weightlifting at the Olympics

Women's 58 kg at the Games of the XXVIII Olympiad
- Venue: Nikaia Olympic Weightlifting Hall
- Date: 16 August 2004
- Competitors: 14 from 13 nations

Medalists
1st place, gold medalist(s)		Chen Yanqing	China
2nd place, silver medalist(s)		Ri Song-hui	North Korea
3rd place, bronze medalist(s)		Wandee Kameaim	Thailand

The women's 58 kilograms weightlifting event at the 2004 Summer Olympics in Athens, Greece took place at the Nikaia Olympic Weightlifting Hall on 16 August.

Total score was the sum of the lifter's best result in each of the snatch and the clean and jerk, with three lifts allowed for each lift. In case of a tie, the lighter lifter won; if still tied, the lifter who took the fewest attempts to achieve the total score won. Lifters without a valid snatch score did not perform the clean and jerk.

== Schedule ==
All times are Eastern European Summer Time (UTC+03:00)

Date	Time	Event
16 August 2004	13:00	Group B
16 August 2004	16:30	Group A

== Records ==
{{{caption}}}
World Record	Snatch	Wang Li (CHN)	110.0 kg	Bali, Indonesia	10 August 2003
World Record	Clean & Jerk	Sun Caiyan (CHN)	133.0 kg	İzmir, Turkey	28 June 2002
World Record	Total	Wang Li (CHN)	240.0 kg	Bali, Indonesia	10 August 2003
Olympic Record	Snatch	Olympic Standard	105.0 kg	—	1 January 1997
Olympic Record	Clean & Jerk	Olympic Standard	130.0 kg	—	1 January 1997
Olympic Record	Total	Olympic Standard	235.0 kg	—	1 January 1997

== Results ==
Rank	Athlete	Group	Body weight	Snatch (kg)				Clean & Jerk (kg)				Total
Rank	Athlete	Group	Body weight	1	2	3	Result	1	2	3	Result	Total
1st place, gold medalist(s)	Chen Yanqing (CHN)	A	57.17	102.5	107.5	~~110.0~~	107.5	~~130.0~~	130.0	~~135.0~~	130.0	237.5
2nd place, silver medalist(s)	Ri Song-hui (PRK)	A	57.22	~~102.5~~	102.5	~~107.5~~	102.5	~~130.0~~	130.0	~~137.5~~	130.0	232.5
3rd place, bronze medalist(s)	Wandee Kameaim (THA)	A	57.27	95.0	100.0	102.5	102.5	125.0	127.5	~~130.0~~	127.5	230.0
4	Aylin Daşdelen (TUR)	A	57.47	~~100.0~~	100.0	~~102.5~~	100.0	~~125.0~~	125.0	~~132.5~~	125.0	225.0
5	Aleksandra Klejnowska (POL)	A	56.96	92.5	95.0	97.5	97.5	~~122.5~~	122.5	~~127.5~~	122.5	220.0
6	Pak Hyon-suk (PRK)	A	57.63	95.0	~~100.0~~	~~100.0~~	95.0	122.5	~~127.5~~	~~127.5~~	122.5	217.5
7	Alexandra Escobar (ECU)	A	56.52	95.0	~~100.0~~	~~100.0~~	95.0	115.0	120.0	~~122.5~~	120.0	215.0
8	Patmawati Abdul Hamid (INA)	A	57.00	95.0	~~100.0~~	~~100.0~~	95.0	117.5	~~122.5~~	~~122.5~~	117.5	212.5
9	Michaela Breeze (GBR)	A	57.45	92.5	~~95.0~~	~~97.5~~	92.5	115.0	120.0	~~122.5~~	120.0	212.5
10	Franca Gbodo (NGR)	B	57.47	90.0	~~95.0~~	95.0	95.0	110.0	115.0	117.5	117.5	212.5
11	Maryse Turcotte (CAN)	B	57.29	85.0	90.0	~~92.5~~	90.0	115.0	~~120.0~~	120.0	120.0	210.0
12	Zlatina Atanasova (BUL)	A	57.68	90.0	~~95.0~~	~~95.0~~	90.0	115.0	~~125.0~~	~~125.0~~	115.0	205.0
13	Charikleia Kastritsi (GRE)	B	57.48	90.0	~~95.0~~	~~95.0~~	90.0	110.0	~~115.0~~	~~115.0~~	110.0	200.0
14	Namkhaidorjiin Bayarmaa (MGL)	B	57.75	80.0	87.5	~~90.0~~	87.5	~~107.5~~	107.5	~~112.5~~	107.5	195.0

== New records ==
Snatch	107.5 kg	Chen Yanqing (CHN)	OR
Total	237.5 kg	Chen Yanqing (CHN)	OR
