= Pang Kum-chol =

North Korean weightlifter (born 1981)

Personal information
- Born: November 11, 1981 (age 44)
- Height: 1.6 m (5 ft 3 in)

Sport
- Country: North Korea
- Sport: Weightlifting
- Event: 77 kg
- Team: Kigwancha Sports Team
Medal record
Men's Weightlifting
Representing North Korea
Asian Games
Gold medal – first place	2010 Guangzhou	77 kg
Asian Championships
Silver medal – second place	2009 Taldykorgan	77 kg – Total
Silver medal – second place	2011 Tongling	77 kg – Total
Silver medal – second place	2011 Tongling	77 kg – Clean & Jerk
Asian Championships
Bronze medal – third place	2009 Taldykorgan	77 kg – Snatch
Bronze medal – third place	2009 Taldykorgan	77 kg – Clean & Jerk
Bronze medal – third place	2011 Tongling	77 kg – Snatch

- Pang Kum-chol
- Hangul: 방금철
- RR: Bang Geumcheol
- MR: Pang Kŭmch'ŏl

Pang Kum-chol (Korean: 방금철; born November 11, 1981) is a North Korean weightlifter who competes in the 77 kg weight category.

== Achievements ==
Pang won two silvers and one bronze at the 2009 Asian Weightlifting Championships.

He went on to win a gold medal at the 2010 Asian Games. He also got medals count repeated at the 2011 Asian Weightlifting Championships.

Pang represents the Kigwancha Sports Team.
