= Teresa Ernster =

Dutch weightlifter

Personal information
- Full name: Teresa Ernster van der Stoep
- Born: 10 June 1970 (age 56)
- Weight: 65.66 kg (144.8 lb)

Sport
- Country: Netherlands
- Sport: Weightlifting
- Weight class: 69 kg
- Team: National team
- Updated on 27 September 2016

Teresa Ernster van der Stoep (born 10 June 1970) is a Dutch female weightlifter, competing in the 69 kg category and representing the Netherlands at international competitions. She competed at world championships, most recently at the 2001 World Weightlifting Championships. Ernster was a judoka and undertook weightlifting as part of cross-training.

== Personal life ==
Teresa is married to Henk van der Stoep, a Greco-Roman wrestler and ten-time Dutch national champion. Henk's sister, Yvonne van der Stoep is also a weightlifter and masters world champion.

== Major results ==
Year	Venue	Weight	Snatch (kg)				Clean & Jerk (kg)				Total	Rank
Year	Venue	Weight	1	2	3	Rank	1	2	3	Rank	Total	Rank
World Championships
2001	Antalya, Turkey	69 kg	~~77.5~~	~~80~~	80	17	97.5	102.5	105	15	185	16
1999	Piraeus, Greece	58 kg	---	---	---	---	---	---	---	---	0	---
1998	Lahti, Finland	58 kg	~~70~~	70	72.5	11	87.5	90	~~92.5~~	11	162.5	11
1997	Chiang Mai, Thailand	54 kg		70.0		15		80.0		17	150.0	16
