= Meagan Warthold =

Australian weightlifter

Personal information
- Full name: Meagan Lee Warthold
- Born: 9 March 1972 (age 54) Melbourne, Australia
- Height: 150 cm (4 ft 11 in)
- Weight: 57.14 kg (126.0 lb)

Sport
- Country: Australia
- Sport: Weightlifting
- Weight class: 58 kg
- Club: Burwood PCYC
- Team: National team
- Updated on 10 October 2016

Meagan Lee Warthold (born 9 March 1972 in Melbourne) is an Australian female weightlifter, competing in the 58 kg category and representing Australia at international competitions.

She participated at the 2000 Summer Olympics in the 58 kg event.

== Major results ==
Year	Venue	Weight	Snatch (kg)				Clean & Jerk (kg)				Total	Rank
Year	Venue	Weight	1	2	3	Rank	1	2	3	Rank	Total	Rank
Summer Olympics
2000	Sydney, Australia	58 kg	75	~~80~~	~~80~~	—N/a	95	100	~~102.5~~	—N/a	175	12
