= Sophia Vandagne =

Seychellois weightlifter

Personal information
- Nationality: Seychellois
- Born: 2 November 1979 (age 46)
- Height: 160 cm (5 ft 3 in)
- Weight: 58 kg (128 lb)

Sport
- Sport: Weightlifting
- Event: Women's 58 kg

Sophia Vandagne (born 2 November 1979) is a Seychellois former weightlifter and Olympian.

Competing in the women's 58 kg event at the 2000 Summer Olympics in Sydney, Sophia finished in thirteenth position with a total weight lifted of 160 kg.

In 1999, Vandagne was nominated Seychellois Young Female Athlete of the year.
