= Patmawati Abdul Hamid =

Indonesian weightlifter (born 1972)

Personal information
- Born: 18 February 1972 (age 54) Makassar, Indonesia
- Height: 158 cm (5 ft 2 in)
- Weight: 56.57 kg (124.7 lb)

Sport
- Country: Indonesia
- Sport: Weightlifting
- Weight class: 58 kg
- Team: National team
Medal record
Women's weightlifting
Representing Indonesia
World Championships
| Gold medal – first place | 1997 Chiang Mai | –59 kg |
| Silver medal – second place | 2003 Vancouver | –58 kg |
Asian Games
| Silver medal – second place | 1990 Beijing | –60 kg |
| Bronze medal – third place | 1994 Hiroshima | –54 kg |
Southeast Asian Games
| Silver medal – second place | 2003 Vietnam | –58 kg |
- Updated on 13 September 2018

Patmawati Abdul Hamid (born 18 February 1972 in Makassar), also written as Patmawati Abdul Wahid, is an Indonesian female former weightlifter who competed in the 58 kg category and represented Indonesia at international competitions.

She competed at the 2004 Summer Olympics and at the 2003 World Weightlifting Championships.

== Major results ==
| Year | Venue | Weight | Snatch (kg) | | | | Clean & Jerk (kg) | | | | Total | Rank |
| Year | Venue | Weight | 1 | 2 | 3 | Rank | 1 | 2 | 3 | Rank | Total | Rank |
Summer Olympics
| 2004 | Athens, Greece | 58 kg | | | | —N/a | | | | —N/a | | 8 |
World Championships
| 1997 | Chiang Mai, Thailand | 59 kg | 90 | 95 | 97.5 | 1st place, gold medalist(s) | 115 | ~~120~~ | ~~120~~ | 1st place, gold medalist(s) | 212.5 | 1st place, gold medalist(s) |
| 2003 | Vancouver, Canada | 58 kg | 90 | 95 | 97.5 | 2nd place, silver medalist(s) | ~~115~~ | 115 | 120 | 2nd place, silver medalist(s) | 217.5 | 2nd place, silver medalist(s) |
