= Emily Quarton =

Canadian weightlifter

Personal information
- Full name: Emily Beth Quarton
- Born: 9 August 1984 (age 41)
- Weight: 57.98 kg (127.8 lb)

Sport
- Country: Canada
- Sport: Weightlifting
- Team: National team
- Updated on 6 September 2016

Emily Beth Quarton (born 9 August 1984) is a Canadian female weightlifter, competing in the 58 kg category and representing Canada at international competitions. She competed at world championships, most recently at the 2010 World Weightlifting Championships. and won a silver medal at the 2006 Melbourne Commonwealth Games and placed fifth at the 2010 Delhi Commonwealth Games.

Quarton lives in Whitehorse, Yukon and is an elementary school teacher.

== Major results ==
Year	Venue	Weight	Snatch (kg)				Clean & Jerk (kg)				Total	Rank
Year	Venue	Weight	1	2	3	Rank	1	2	3	Rank	Total	Rank
World Championships
2010	Antalya, Turkey	58 kg	80	~~83~~	~~83~~	26	~~100~~	100	104	18	184	19
2009	Goyang, South Korea	58 kg	78	~~81~~	81	11	~~98~~	98	102	13	183	11
2006	Santo Domingo, Dominican Republic	58 kg	80	~~83~~	83	18	100	~~105~~	~~105~~	21	183.0	21
