= Charikleia Kastritsi =

Greek weightlifter (born 1983)

Personal information
- Full name: Charikleia Kastritsi
- Born: 11 April 1983 (age 43)
- Height: 160 cm (5 ft 3 in)
- Weight: 57.95 kg (127.8 lb)

Sport
- Country: Greece
- Sport: Weightlifting
- Weight class: 58 kg
- Club: Sporting Pileas
- Team: National team
- Updated on 8 September 2016

Charikleia Kastritsi (Χαρίκλεια Καστρίτση, born 11 April 1983) is a Greek female weightlifter, competing in the 58 kg category and representing Greece at international competitions.

She participated at the 2004 Summer Olympics in the 58 kg event. She competed at world championships, most recently at the 2007 World Weightlifting Championships.

== Major results ==
Year	Venue	Weight	Snatch (kg)				Clean & Jerk (kg)				Total	Rank
Year	Venue	Weight	1	2	3	Rank	1	2	3	Rank	Total	Rank
Summer Olympics
2004	Athens, Greece	58 kg	90.0	~~95.0~~	~~95.0~~	90.0	110.0	~~115.0~~	~~115.0~~	110.0	200.0	13
World Championships
2007	Chiang Mai, Thailand	58 kg	78	~~83~~	83	22	97	102	105	22	188	22
2006	Santo Domingo, Dominican Republic	58 kg	81	~~84~~	84	17	96	100	104	18	188.0	17
2005	Doha, Qatar	58 kg	80	~~83~~	~~83~~	12	100	103	~~105~~	13	183.0	13
2003	Vancouver, Canada	58 kg	~~85~~	85	~~90~~	23	105	~~112.5~~	~~112.5~~	21	190	21
2002	Warsaw, Poland	58 kg	90	95	97.5	2nd place, silver medalist(s)	107.5	112.5	~~115~~	7	210	3rd place, bronze medalist(s)
