= 1997 World Weightlifting Championships – Women's 59 kg =

The 1997 World Weightlifting Championships were held in Chiang Mai, Thailand from December 6 to December 14. The women's competition in the 59 kg division was staged on 9 December 1997.

== Medalists ==
Event	Gold		Silver		Bronze	
Snatch	Patmawati Abdul Hamid (INA)	97.5 kg	Khassaraporn Suta (THA)	92.5 kg	Wu Mei-yi (TPE)	92.5 kg
Clean & Jerk	Khassaraporn Suta (THA)	117.5 kg	Naw Ju Ni (MYA)	117.5 kg	Patmawati Abdul Hamid (INA)	115.0 kg
Total	Patmawati Abdul Hamid (INA)	212.5 kg	Khassaraporn Suta (THA)	210.0 kg	Naw Ju Ni (MYA)	207.5 kg

== Records ==
Prior to this competition, the existing world records were as follows.

World Record	Snatch	Zou Feie (CHN)	100.0 kg	Busan, South Korea	13 May 1997
World Record	Clean & Jerk	Khassaraporn Suta (THA)	125.0 kg	Jakarta, Indonesia	13 October 1997
World Record	Total	Chen Xiaomin (CHN)	220.0 kg	Hiroshima, Japan	4 October 1994

== Results ==
Rank	Athlete	Body weight	Snatch (kg)				Clean & Jerk (kg)				Total
Rank	Athlete	Body weight	1	2	3	Rank	1	2	3	Rank	Total
1st place, gold medalist(s)	Patmawati Abdul Hamid (INA)	57.65	90.0	95.0	97.5	1st place, gold medalist(s)	115.0	~~120.0~~	~~120.0~~	3rd place, bronze medalist(s)	212.5
2nd place, silver medalist(s)	Khassaraporn Suta (THA)	58.05	87.5	92.5	~~95.0~~	2nd place, silver medalist(s)	117.5	~~122.5~~	~~122.5~~	1st place, gold medalist(s)	210.0
3rd place, bronze medalist(s)	Naw Ju Ni (MYA)	58.20	85.0	90.0	~~95.0~~	4	110.0	117.5	~~120.0~~	2nd place, silver medalist(s)	207.5
4	Wu Mei-yi (TPE)	58.50	~~92.5~~	92.5	~~95.0~~	3rd place, bronze medalist(s)	~~112.5~~	112.5	115.0	4	207.5
5	Karnam Malleswari (IND)	58.60	90.0	~~95.0~~	~~95.0~~	5	115.0	~~120.0~~	~~120.0~~	5	205.0
6	Nancy Niro (CAN)	58.55	80.0	85.0	~~87.5~~	6	100.0	~~105.0~~	105.0	7	190.0
7	Dominika Misterska (POL)	57.70	75.0	80.0	~~82.5~~	7	95.0	100.0	102.5	8	182.5
8	Pratima Kumari (IND)	58.40	~~77.5~~	77.5	~~82.5~~	12	~~105.0~~	105.0	~~112.5~~	6	182.5
9	Josefa Pérez (ESP)	58.50	77.5	80.0	~~82.5~~	9	97.5	100.0	~~102.5~~	11	180.0
10	Valentina Popova (RUS)	57.90	75.0	77.5	80.0	8	97.5	~~102.5~~	~~102.5~~	12	177.5
11	Isabella Aconiti (ITA)	58.40	~~75.0~~	75.0	77.5	11	97.5	~~100.0~~	100.0	10	177.5
12	Olga Sablina (UZB)	55.85	75.0	~~80.0~~	~~80.0~~	13	100.0	~~105.0~~	—	9	175.0
13	Ana María Arraez (VEN)	58.00	~~77.5~~	77.5	~~80.0~~	10	97.5	~~100.0~~	~~100.0~~	13	175.0
14	Lilia Musakayeva (RUS)	56.20	~~72.5~~	~~72.5~~	72.5	15	95.0	~~100.0~~	~~100.0~~	14	167.5
15	Marie Korčiánová (CZE)	58.55	72.5	75.0	~~77.5~~	14	~~92.5~~	92.5	~~95.0~~	15	167.5
16	Nurbanu Akdoğan (TUR)	58.70	65.0	~~72.5~~	72.5	16	80.0	85.0	90.0	16	162.5
17	Nita Uera (NRU)	58.35	60.0	~~65.0~~	65.0	17	80.0	85.0	87.5	17	152.5
