= Patricia Domínguez =

Mexican weightlifter

Monica Patricia Dominguez Lara
Personal information
- Born: 5 March 1988 (age 37) Hermosillo, Sonora, Mexico
- Height: 1.62 m (5 ft 4 in)
- Weight: 57.83 kg (127.5 lb)

Sport
- Country: Mexico
- Sport: Weightlifting
- Team: National team
- Updated on 20 July 2016

Monica Patricia Dominguez Lara (born 5 March 1988) is a Mexican weightlifter, competing in the 58 kg category and representing Mexico at international competitions.

== Career ==
Domínguez competed in March 2011 at the 30th Manuel Suárez Memoriam International Weightlifting Tournament in Cárdenas, in the 63 kg category, lifting 200 kg and securing Mexico's fifth gold medal for the sport. The event served as part of the selection process for her participation in the Pan American Games in Guadalajara that year. In August 2011, she competed at Shenzhen University, winning a bronze medal in the 58 kg category for her total of 201 kg in the clean and jerk.

At the 2014 Pan American Weightlifting Championships in Santo Domingo, Domínguez won a silver medal in the 58 kg category, tying with Yusleidy Figueroa with a snatch weight of 90 kg. She won the bronze for total weight in the clean and jerk category with 199 kg. The event served as a qualified for the 2015 Toronto Pan American Games.

At the 2015 Houston World Weightlifting Championship competition, Domínguez placed 16th in the 58 kg category. She participated in the National First Force Championship in Monterrey in 2015, a qualifying round for the 2015 Pan American Games in Barranquilla. The Barranquilla competition also served as a qualifier for participation in the 2016 Summer Olympics.

Domínguez was a member of the Mexican Olympic team at the 2016 games in Rio, scheduled to compete first in the 58 kg category. She ranked 8th.

She participated in the 2018 Central American and Caribbean Games, winning a silver medal in the women's 58 kg snatch with a lift of 92 kg and a bronze in the clean and jerk with 115 kg.

== Major results ==
Year	Venue	Weight	Snatch (kg)				Clean & Jerk (kg)				Total	Rank
Year	Venue	Weight	1	2	3	Rank	1	2	3	Rank	Total	Rank
World Championships
2010	Antalya, Turkey	-58 kg	87	90	~~92~~	13	108	111	~~114~~	11	201	11
2011	Paris, France	-58 kg	~~87~~	87	~~90~~	20	106	110	~~113~~	17	197	17
2013	Wrocław, Poland	-58 kg	92	95	97	9	~~115~~	~~115~~	115	12	212	12
2015	Houston, United States	-58 kg	88	~~91~~	~~91~~	20	110	113	~~115~~	16	201	16
Summer Olympic Games
2016	Rio de Janeiro, Brazil	-58 kg	91	94	96	8	115	~~118~~	~~119~~	8	211	8
