= Soraya Jiménez =

Mexican weightlifter (1977–2013)

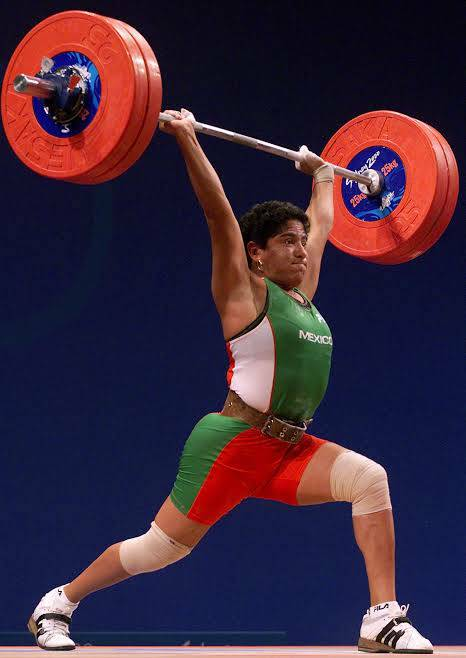

Personal information
- Born: 5 August 1977 Naucalpan, State of Mexico, Mexico
- Died: 28 March 2013 (aged 35) Mexico City, Mexico
Medal record
Women's Weightlifting
Representing Mexico
Olympic Games
Gold medal – first place	2000 Sydney	– 58 kg
Pan American Games
Silver medal – second place	2003 Santo Domingo	– 58 kg
Bronze medal – third place	1999 Winnipeg	– 58 kg

Soraya Jiménez Mendivil (a twin sister born 5 August 1977 – 28 March 2013) was a Mexican weightlifter and Olympic champion. She participated at the 2000 Summer Olympics in Sydney where she won a gold medal. Jiménez became the first ever female athlete from Mexico to win an Olympic gold medal.

She died at age 35 on 28 March 2013 at her home in Mexico City after suffering a heart attack.

== Major results ==
She competed at world championships, most recently at the 2003 World Weightlifting Championships.

Year	Venue	Weight	Snatch (kg)				Clean & Jerk (kg)				Total	Rank
Year	Venue	Weight	1	2	3	Rank	1	2	3	Rank	Total	Rank
World Championships
2003	Vancouver, Canada	58 kg	90	~~92.5~~	~~92.5~~	5	~~110~~	~~110~~	110	11	200	11
2002	Warsaw, Poland	58 kg	87.5	90	~~92.5~~	9	110	~~115~~	~~115~~	9	200	9
1999	Piraeus, Greece	58 kg	85	~~87.5~~	~~87.5~~	8	107.5	~~112.5~~	112.5	7	197.5	8
1998	Lahti, Finland	58 kg	70	72.5	~~75~~	12	~~80~~	80	85	14	157.5	13
