= Nastassia Novikava =

Belarusian weightlifter (born 1981)

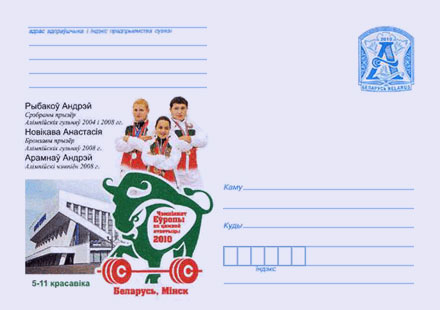
- Nastassia Novikava (centre), on a pre-stamped envelope of Belarus

Personal information
- Born: 16 November 1981 (age 44)
- Height: 1.5 m (4 ft 11 in)
- Weight: 58 kg (128 lb)

Sport
- Country: Belarus
- Sport: Weightlifting
- Event: 58kg
- Coached by: Viktor Shilay
Medal record
Women's Weightlifting
Representing Belarus
Olympic Games
Disqualified	2008 Beijing	– 53 kg
World Championships
Gold medal – first place	2011 Paris	– 58 kg
Silver medal – second place	2007 Chiang Mai	– 53 kg
Silver medal – second place	2009 Goyang	– 58 kg
Silver medal – second place	2010 Antalya	– 58 kg
European Championships
Gold medal – first place	2005 Sofia	– 53 kg
Gold medal – first place	2009 Bucharest	– 58 kg
Gold medal – first place	2010 Minsk	– 58 kg
Gold medal – first place	2011 Kazan	– 58 kg
Bronze medal – third place	2004 Kyiv	– 53 kg
- Updated on 27 October 2016

Nastassia Novikava (Belarusian: Настасся Новікава) (born 16 November 1981 in Zhodzina, Byelorussian SSR) is a world championship winning weightlifter from Belarus.

== Career ==
At the 2004 Summer Olympics Novikava ranked fifth in the 53 kg class. At the 2007 World Weightlifting Championships she won the silver medal in the 53 kg class, lifting a total of 213 kg.

She initially won the bronze medal in the women's 53 kg event at the 2008 Summer Olympics.

After 2008, Novikava moved up to the -58 kg category.

She won the 2010 European Championship with a personal best of 238 kg. In 2011, she won the world championship with a total of 237 kg.

At the 2012 Summer Olympics, she finished 7th with a total of 230 kg.

In 2016, she was stripped of her 2008 Olympic medal after a retest of her doping sample tested positive for steroids.
