= Christin Ulrich =

German weightlifter (born 1990)

Christin Ulrich (born 19 September 1990) is a German weightlifter, born in Schmalkalden. She competed at the 2012 Summer Olympics in the women's 58 kg, finishing in 13th, lifting 93 kg in the snatch and 114 kg in the clean and jerk, for a total of 207 kg.
