= Bediha Tunadağı =

Turkish weightlifter (born 1985)

Personal information
- Nationality: Turkish
- Born: 20 August 1985 (age 40) Gaziantep, Turkey
- Height: 1.63 m (5 ft 4 in)
- Weight: 60 kg (132 lb)

Sport
- Country: Turkey
- Sport: Weightlifting
- Event: –58 kg
- Club: Gaziantep Halter İhtisas S.K.
- Coached by: Mehmet Doğan
Medal record
Women's weightlifting
Representing Turkey
Islamic Solidarity Games
Gold medal – first place	2017 Baku	53 kg

Bediha Tunadağı (born 20 August 1985 in Gaziantep, Turkey) is a Turkish weightlifter competing in the – 58 kg division.

== Career ==
The 1.63 m (5 ft 4 in) tall sportswoman is a member of Gaziantep Halter İhtisas S.K. in her hometown, where she is coached by Mehmet Doğan.

As of July 2012, her best accomplishment at international level is a fourth place achieved at the 2011 European Weightlifting Championships in Kazan, Russia.

Tunadağı qualified to participate at the 2012 Summer Olympics.

== Achievements ==
Rank			Competition	Host	Result
S	C	T	Competition	Host	Result
4	6	5	2004 World Junior Championships	(Belarus) Minsk	75+90=165
14	10	13	2010 World Championships	(Turkey) Antalya	89+111=200
4	4	4	2011 European Championships	(Russia) Kazan	87+108=195
15	13	13	2011 World Championships	(France) Paris	90+115=205
5	-	-	2012 European Championships	(Turkey) Antalya	91+ - = 0
