= O Jong-ae =

North Korean weightlifter (born 1984)

Medal record

Women's weightlifting

Representing North Korea

Olympic Games
Silver medal – second place	2008 Beijing	–58 kg

World Championships
Bronze medal – third place	2007 Chiang Mai	–58 kg

Universiade
Gold medal – first place	2011 Shenzhen	–58 kg

- O Jong-ae
- Hangul: 오정애
- RR: O Jeongae
- MR: O Chŏngae
- IPA: [o.dzʌŋ.ɛ]

O Jong-ae (오정애; born January 17, 1984) is a female weightlifter from North Korea.

At the 2007 World Weightlifting Championships she won the bronze medal in the 58 kg category, lifting 227 kg in total.

She won the silver medal in the 58 kg category at the 2008 Summer Olympics, with 226 kg in total.
