= Evelyn Ebhomien =

Nigerian weightlifter

Personal information
- Nationality: Nigerian
- Born: 15 February 1981 (age 44)

Sport
- Sport: Weightlifting

Evelyn Ebhomien (born 15 February 1981) is a Nigerian weightlifter. She competed in the women's lightweight event at the 2000 Summer Olympics.
