= Geralee Vega =

Puerto Rican weightlifter (born 1986)

Gerald Vega
Personal information
- Full name: Gerald Vega Morales
- Nationality: Puerto Rico
- Born: 22 July 1986 (age 39)
- Height: 1.63 m (5 ft 4 in)
- Weight: 58 kg (128 lb)

Sport
- Sport: Weightlifting
- Event: 58 kg

Gerald Vega Morales (born July 22, 1986) is a Puerto Rican weightlifter. Vega represented Puerto Rico at the 2008 Summer Olympics in Beijing, where she competed for the women's lightweight category (58 kg). Vega placed ninth in this event, as she successfully lifted 90 kg in the single-motion snatch, and hoisted 112 kg in the two-part, shoulder-to-overhead clean and jerk, for a total of 202 kg.
