= Josephine Ip =

Hong Kong surgeon and weightlifting referee (born 20th century)

Josephine Yip Wing-yuk (born 20th century) is a Hong Kong orthopedic surgeon. She is an International Powerlifting Federation level 1 referee and an International Weightlifting Federation referee.

== Education and career ==
Ip is a former president of the Hong Kong, China Weightlifting and Powerlifting Association.

She is also a clinical associate professor in the Department of Orthopaedics and Traumatology at the School of Clinical Medicine, University of Hong Kong. She obtained a Bachelor of Medicine and Bachelor of Surgery (MBBS) degree and a Master of Surgery (MS) degree at the University of Hong Kong, and the Diploma in Hand Surgery from the Federation of European Societies for Surgery of the Hand (FESSH).

Ip is a Fellow of the Royal College of Surgeons of Edinburgh, a Fellow of the Hong Kong College of Orthopaedic Surgeons, and a Fellow of the Hong Kong Academy of Medicine (Orthopaedic Surgery).

=== Controversy ===
In March 2024, during her speech at the "Hong Kong Weightlifting Invitation 2024", Ip Wing-yuk described Hong Kong as a "relatively small country", which caused dissatisfaction from the Hong Kong government and the Sports Federation & Olympic Committee of Hong Kong, China (SF&OC). Later, the SF&OC acknowledged that it was a slip of the tongue and decided not to pursue the matter further.

In May 2024, during the opening-ceremony speech of the "Asian Equipped Powerlifting Championships cum Asian University Cup", Ip Wing-yuk mistakenly stated that "13 countries are participating in the competition". Since Taiwan and Hong Kong were participating in the competition, the Hong Kong Special Administrative Region (HKSAR) Government criticized her statement for potentially violating the One-China principle.
