= Annie Moniqui =

Canadian weightlifter

Personal information
- Full name: Annie Marie Roseline Moniqui
- Born: March 28, 1990 (age 36) Godmanchester, Quebec

Sport
- Country: Canada
- Sport: Weightlifting
- Event: Women's 58 kg

Annie Marie Roseline Moniqui (born March 28, 1990, in Godmanchester, Quebec) is a Canadian weightlifter. She competed at the 2012 Summer Olympics in the women's 58 kg, finishing in 16th with a total of 190 kg.
