= Li Xueying =

Chinese weightlifter (born 1990)

Personal information
- Born: May 15, 1990 (age 36) Henan
- Height: 1.61 m (5 ft 3 1/2 in)
- Weight: 58 kg (128 lb)

Sport
- Country: China
- Sport: Weightlifting
- Event: 58kg
Medal record
Women's Weightlifting
Representing China
Olympic Games
Gold medal – first place	2012 London	58 kg
World Weightlifting Championships
Gold medal – first place	2009 Goyang	– 58 kg
Silver medal – second place	2011 Paris	– 58 kg
- Updated on 30 July 2012

Li Xueying (Chinese: 李雪英; pinyin: Lǐ Xuěyīng; born May 15, 1990, in Henan) is a Chinese weightlifter. She won gold medal at the 2012 Summer Olympics by lifting 108 kg (238 lb) and 138 kg (304 lb) on snatch and clean & jerk, respectively, with a total weight lifted of 246 kg (542 lb), setting a new Olympic record in both snatch and total weight lifted.

== See also ==
- China at the 2012 Summer Olympics
