= Marina Shainova =

Russian weightlifter (born 1986)

Personal information
- Born: 14 March 1986 (age 40) Konokovo, Krasnodar Krai, USSR
Medal record
Women's Weightlifting
Representing Russia
Olympic Games
Disqualified	2008 Beijing	– 58 kg
World Championships
Silver medal – second place	2007 Chiang Mai	– 58 kg
Bronze medal – third place	2005 Doha	– 58 kg
European Championships
Gold medal – first place	2005 Sofia	– 58 kg
Gold medal – first place	2006 Władysławowo	– 58 kg
Gold medal – first place	2007 Strasbourg	– 58 kg
Gold medal – first place	2011 Kazan	– 63 kg
Disqualified	2013 Tirana	– 63 kg

Marina Vladimirovna Shainova (Russian: Марина Владимировна Шаинова; born 14 March 1986 in Krasnodar Krai) is a Russian weightlifter.

== Career ==
Shainova won the Junior World Championships twice, 2005 in the 58 kg category, and 2006 in the 63 kg category.

She competed in the women's 58 kg at the 2005 World Championships in Doha, Qatar and won the bronze medal with 233 kg in total.

At the 2006 European Championships in Władysławowo, Poland she won gold in the Women's 58 kg with 237 kg in total, breaking three European records. She won another gold medal at the 2007 European Weightlifting Championships.

At the 2007 World Championships in Chiang Mai, Thailand she won the silver medal in the Women's 58 kg with 237 kg in total.

Shainova won the silver medal at the 2008 Summer Olympics in the 58 kg category. In 2016, she was stripped of her medal and disqualified from the Beijing 2008 Olympics following reanalysis of her samples from the 2008 Olympics, resulted in a positive test for the prohibited substances stanozolol and turinabol.

In 2013, Shainova was banned from international competition by the International Weightlifting Federation for two years for use of the anabolic steroid stanozolol.
