= Gu Wei =

Chinese weightlifter (born 1986)

Medal record

Women's Weightlifting

Representing China

World Weightlifting Championships
Gold medal – first place	2005 Doha	58 kg

Gu Wei (born April 25, 1986) is a Chinese weightlifter competing in the Women's 58 kg category.

At the 2005 World Championships in Doha, Qatar she won the gold medal with 102 kg in the snatch, a world record of 139 kg in the clean and jerk, and a world record of 241 kg in total.

She won the overall bronze medal at the 2006 World Junior Championships, with a total of 205 kg.
