= Yang Eun-hye =

South Korean weightlifter (born 1987)

- Hangul: 양은혜
- RR: Yang Eunhye
- MR: Yang Ŭnhye

Yang Eun-hye (Korean: 양은혜; born July 25, 1987) is a South Korean weightlifter. Yang was born in Jeju Province, South Korea. She competed at the 2012 Summer Olympics in the women's 58 kg, finishing 14th.
