= Pimsiri Sirikaew =

Thai weightlifter (born 1990)

Pimsiri Sirikaew TBh
Personal information
- Nickname: Taew (แต้ว)
- Nationality: Thai
- Born: April 25, 1990 (age 36) Amphoe Mancha Khiri, Khon Kaen Province
- Height: 1.49 m (4 ft 10 1/2 in)
- Weight: 58 kg (128 lb)

Sport
- Country: Thailand
- Sport: Weightlifting
- Event: 58kg
Medal record
Women's Weightlifting
Representing Thailand
Olympic Games
Silver medal – second place	2012 London	–58 kg
Silver medal – second place	2016 Rio de Janeiro	–58 kg
World Weightlifting Championships
Bronze medal – third place	2011 Paris	–58 kg
Asian Championships
Silver medal – second place	2015 Phuket	–63 kg

Pimsiri Sirikaew (Thai: พิมศิริ ศิริแก้ว; RTGS: Phimsiri Sirikaeo; born April 25, 1990) is a Thai weightlifter. She is a two-time Olympic silver medalist in the women's 58 kg division.
