= Pak Hyon-suk =

North Korean weightlifter (born 1985)

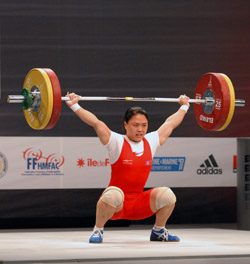
- Pak Hyon-Suk, 2011 WWC

Medal record

Representing North Korea

Women's Weightlifting

Olympic Games
Gold medal – first place	2008 Beijing	63 kg

Asian Games
Bronze medal – third place	2006 Doha	58 kg
Silver medal – second place	2010 Guangzhou	58 kg

World Weightlifting Championships
Bronze medal – third place	2007 Chiang Mai	63 kg

- Pak Hyon-suk
- Hangul: 박현숙
- Hanja: 朴賢淑
- RR: Bak Hyeonsuk
- MR: Pak Hyŏnsuk

Pak Hyon-Suk (Korean: 박현숙; Korean pronunciation: [pak̚ hjʌn.suk̚] or [pa.kʰjʌn.suk̚]; born August 4, 1985) is a female weightlifter from North Korea.

She ranked 6th in the Woman's 58 kg category at the 2004 Summer Olympics, lifting 217.5 kg in total.

At the 2007 World Weightlifting Championships she won the bronze medal in the 63 kg category with a total of 228 kg.

She won the gold medal in the 63 kg category at the 2008 Summer Olympics, with 241 kg in total.

Upon receiving her gold medal, she obtained a warm reception back in her home country and from the KCNA.

Pak represents the Amnokgang Sports Team.
