= Yuliya Shymechko =

Ukrainian weightlifter (born 1988)

Yuliya Kalina
Personal information
- Born: October 24, 1988 (age 37) Zhdanov, Ukrainian SSR, Soviet Union
Medal record
Women's weightlifting
Representing Ukraine
Olympic Games
Disqualified	2012 London	–58 kg
World Championships
Silver medal – second place	2009 Goyang	–58 kg
European Championships
Gold medal – first place	2015 Tbilisi	–63 kg
Silver medal – second place	2009 Bucharest	–58 kg
Bronze medal – third place	2014 Tel Aviv	–63 kg

Yuliya Kalina (Ukrainian: Юлія Каліна; born October 24, 1988) is a Ukrainian weightlifter. She competed at the 2012 Summer Olympics in the women's 58 kg and, after initially winning a bronze medal, was later disqualified for doping offenses.

== Career ==
Kalina started weightlifting at the age of 12. At 13 she joined Ukraine's junior weightlifting team. 2 years later Kalina became a single parent with one daughter, Myroslava (born in 2003). Myroslava lives with her grandmother in Mariupol, while her mother resides in Kyiv.

On 13 July 2016, IOC announced that Yuliya Kalina has been disqualified from the 2012 Summer Olympics and ordered to return the bronze medal from the 58 kg weightlifting event. Reanalysis of Kalina's samples from London 2012 resulted in a positive test for the prohibited substance dehydrochlormethyltestosterone (turinabol). She has been disqualified for two years until 10 June 2018.

Since 1 May 2017, she is married to Ukrainian weightlifter Ihor Shymechko.
