= Jong Chun-mi =

North Korean weightlifter (born 1985)

Personal information
- Born: March 15, 1985 (age 41)
- Height: 1.64 m (5 ft 4 1/2 in)
- Weight: 58 kg (128 lb)

Korean name
- Hangul: 정춘미
- RR: Jeong Chunmi
- MR: Chŏng Ch'unmi

Sport
- Country: North Korea
- Sport: Weightlifting
- Event: 58kg
Medal record
Women's Weightlifting
Representing North Korea
World Championships
Bronze medal – third place	2010 Antalya	– 58 kg
Asian Weightlifting Championships
Bronze medal – third place	2013 Astana	– 58 kg
- Updated on 25 July 2012

Jong Chun-mi (Korean: 정춘미; born March 15, 1985) is a female North Korean weightlifter who competes in the -58 kg division. She finished 6th at the 2012 Summer Olympics.
