= Wandee Kameaim =

Thai weightlifter (born 1978)

Wandee Kameaim TBh
Personal information
- Born: 1978-01-18
Medal record
Olympic Games
| Bronze medal – third place | 2004 Athens | – 58 kg |
| Bronze medal – third place | 2008 Beijing | – 58 kg |
World Championships
| Silver medal – second place | 2002 Warsaw | – 58 kg |
| Silver medal – second place | 2005 Doha | – 58 kg |
| Bronze medal – third place | 2006 Santo Domingo | – 58 kg |
Asian Games
| Silver medal – second place | 2002 Busan | – 58 kg |
| Silver medal – second place | 2006 Doha | – 58 kg |

Wandee Kameaim (Thai: วันดี คำเอี่ยม, born January 18, 1978, in Ban Pong) is a Thai weightlifter.

At the 2002 World Championships she won the silver medal in the 58 kg category, with 212.5 kg in total.

She competed in the women's 58 kg at the 2004 Summer Olympics and won the bronze medal with 230.0 kg in total.

Kameaim competed in the Women's 58 kg at the 2005 World Championships in Doha, Qatar and won the silver medal with 236.0 kg in total. For a short time she held the World Record in clean and jerk with 135 kg, but lost it in the same event to Gu Wei who lifted 136 kg, and then 139 kg. A year later she stuck at 230.0 kg at the 2006 World Weightlifting Championships and took the bronze medal.

At the 2008 Summer Olympics she ranked 4th in the 58 kg category, but in 2017 was raised to the bronze later when re-analysis of the silver medalist's drug test caused her disqualification.
