= Marieta Gotfryd =

Polish weightlifter (born 1980)

Personal information
- Born: 11 September 1980 (age 45)
Medal record
World Championships
Bronze medal – third place	2001 Antalya	– 58 kg
European Championships
Silver medal – second place	2001 Trencin	– 58 kg
Bronze medal – third place	1999 La Coruña	– 58 kg
Bronze medal – third place	2005 Sofia	– 58 kg

Marieta Gotfryd (born 11 September 1980 in Gorna Oryahovitsa, Bulgaria) is a Polish weightlifter.

At the 2001 World Championships she won the bronze medal in the 58 kg category.

She also won the bronze medal in the same category at the 2005 European Championships.

She competed in the Women's 58 kg at the 2005 World Championships in Doha, Qatar and reached the 5th spot with 212 kg in total.

At the 2008 Summer Olympics she ranked 10th in the 58 kg category.

She currently represents club Tytan Oława.
