= Qiu Hongmei =

Chinese weightlifter (born 1983)

Qiu Hongmei (Chinese: 邱红梅, born 2 March 1983) is a Chinese weightlifter.

Qiu participated in the women's -58 kg class at the 2006 World Weightlifting Championships and won the gold medal, snatching 107 kg and clean and jerking an additional 130 kg for a total of 237 kg.

At the 2007 World Weightlifting Championships, she won gold again in the women's -58 kg class.

With 141 kg, she held the world record in clean and jerk in the women's -58 kg class., before Taiwan's Kuo Hsing-chun lifted 142 kg (313 lb) at the 2017 Summer Universiade on August 21.

== Achievements ==
2006 World Weightlifting Championships, -58 kg
2007 World Weightlifting Championships, -58 kg
