= Chen Yanqing =

Chinese weightlifter (born 1979)

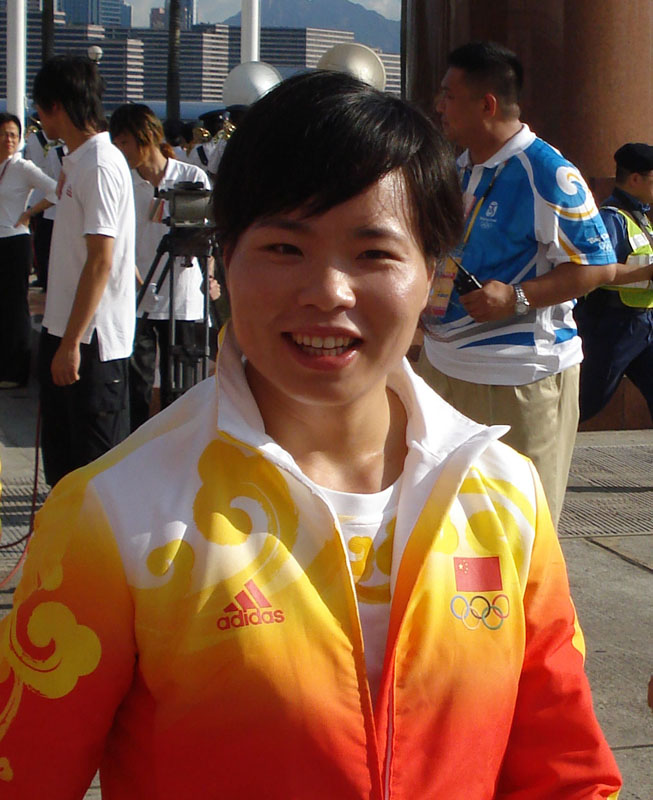
- Chen in 2008

Personal information
- Born: May 4, 1979 (age 47) Suzhou, Jiangsu Province
- Height: 158 cm (5 ft 2 in) (2004)
- Weight: 58 kg (128 lb) (2004)

Sport
- Sport: Weightlifting
Medal record
Women's Weightlifting
Representing China
Olympic Games
Gold medal – first place	2004 Athens	58 kg
Gold medal – first place	2008 Beijing	58 kg
World Championships
Gold medal – first place	1997 Chiang Mai	64 kg
Gold medal – first place	1999 Athens	58 kg
Asian Games
Gold medal – first place	1998 Bangkok	58 kg
Gold medal – first place	2006 Doha	58 kg
- Updated on 3 July 2014

Chen Yanqing (simplified Chinese: 陈艳青; traditional Chinese: 陳艷青; pinyin: Chén Yànqīng; born May 4, 1979) is a Chinese weightlifter who competed in the 2004 Summer Olympics and the 2008 Summer Olympics. She won the gold medal in the 58 kg class in both competitions, making her the first woman to win gold medals in weightlifting in two consecutive Olympics.

Chen was born in Suzhou, Jiangsu. She won her first gold medal in 1995 at the Junior Asian Women Weightlifting Championship, and another at a 1998 world championship. She was slated to compete at the 2000 Summer Olympics but was scratched from the Chinese Olympic lineup for strategic reasons a short time before the games began. She has also won the National Games and East Asia Games and set the world record in her weight class in the snatch and lift in 2006.

== Personal life ==
Chen was born to a poor rural family who live in a small farming village called Xishan (西山) on an island near Suzhou, two hours west of Shanghai. Her parents are both fruit growers. In 1989 her parents sent her to a state athletic school after coach and former weightlifter Cao Xinmin discovered her at a sports match in Suzhou. Her parents have mixed emotions about her career in weightlifting, but her earnings have helped raise her family's standard of living.

After she was scratched from the 2000 Summer Olympics, she retired in 2001 to study business at Soochow University in Suzhou. She returned from retirement to compete in the 2004 and 2008 Summer Olympics.
