= Doping at the Olympic Games =

Use of banned drugs at the Olympics

Doping at the Olympic Games is the use of prohibited athletic performance-enhancing drugs during or before Olympic events. Doping at the Olympic Games often results in an athlete or team's medal being stripped. Medals can also be stripped for other reasons, but doping is the lead reason for a medal being stripped. Doping often disqualifies the athlete or team from further competition.

== History ==
The use of performance-enhancing tactics and, more broadly, the use of any external device to nefariously influence the outcome of a sporting event has been a part of the Olympics since its inception in Ancient Greece. One speculation as to why men were required to compete naked was to prevent the use of extra accoutrements and to keep women from competing in events specifically designed for men. Athletes were also known to drink "magic" potions and eat exotic meats in the hopes of giving them an athletic edge on their competition. If they were caught cheating, their likenesses were often engraved into stone and placed in a pathway that led to the Olympic stadium. In the modern Olympic era, chemically enhancing one's performance has evolved into a sophisticated science, but in the early years of the Modern Olympic movement the use of performance-enhancing drugs was almost as crude as its ancient predecessors. For example, the winner of the marathon at the 1904 Games, Thomas Hicks, was given strychnine and brandy by his coach, even during the race.

During the early 20th century, many Olympic athletes discovered ways to improve their athletic abilities by boosting testosterone. As their methods became more extreme, it became increasingly evident that the use of performance-enhancing drugs was not only a threat to the integrity of sport but could also have potentially fatal side effects on the athlete. The only Olympic death linked to athletic drug use occurred at the Rome Games of 1960. During the cycling road race, Danish cyclist Knud Enemark Jensen fell from his bicycle and later died. A coroner's inquiry found that he was under the influence of amphetamine, which had caused him to lose consciousness during the race. Jensen's death exposed to the world how endemic drug use was among elite athletes. By the mid-1960s, sports federations were starting to ban the use of performance-enhancing drugs, and the IOC followed suit in 1967.

The first Olympic athlete to test positive for the use of performance-enhancing drugs was Hans-Gunnar Liljenwall, a Swedish pentathlete at the 1968 Summer Olympics, who lost his bronze medal for alcohol use, "two beers" to steady his nerves. Liljenwall was the only athlete to test positive for a banned substance at the 1968 Olympics, but as the technology and testing techniques improved, the number of athletes discovered to be chemically enhancing their performance increased as well.

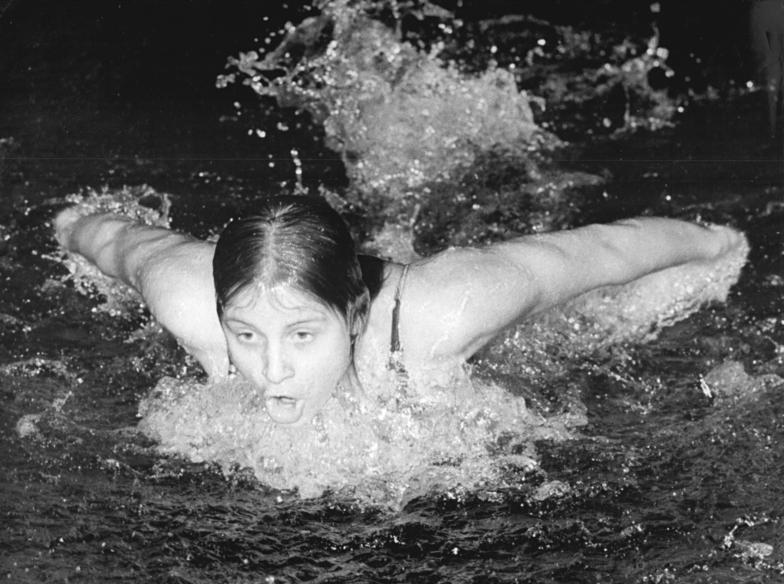
Kornelia Ender

The most systematic case of drug use for athletic achievement is that of the East German Olympic teams of the 1970s and 1980s. In 1990, documents were discovered that showed many East German female athletes, especially swimmers, had been administered anabolic steroids and other drugs by their coaches and trainers. Girls as young as eleven were started on the drug regimen without consent from their parents. American female swimmers, including Shirley Babashoff, accused the East Germans of using performance-enhancing drugs as early as the 1976 Summer Games. Babashoff's comments were dismissed by the international and domestic media as sour grapes since Babashoff, a clear favorite to win multiple gold medals, won three silver medals – losing all three times to either of the two East Germans Kornelia Ender or Petra Thümer, and one gold medal in a relay. There was no suspicion of cheating on the part of the East German female swimmers even though their medal tally increased from four silvers and one bronze in 1972 to ten golds (out of a possible 12), six silvers, and one bronze in 1976. No clear evidence was discovered until after the fall of the Berlin Wall, when the aforementioned documents proved that East Germany had embarked on a state-sponsored drug regimen to dramatically improve their competitiveness at the Olympic Games and other international sporting events. Many of the East German authorities responsible for this program have been subsequently tried and found guilty of various crimes in the German penal system.

The report, titled "Doping in Germany from 1950 to today", details how the West German government helped fund a wide-scale doping program. West Germany encouraged and covered up a culture of doping across many sports for decades. Doping of West German athletes was prevalent at the Munich Games of 1972, and at the 1976 Montreal Olympics.

According to British journalist Andrew Jennings, a KGB colonel stated that the agency's officers had posed as anti-doping authorities from the International Olympic Committee to undermine doping tests and that Soviet athletes were "rescued with [these] tremendous efforts". On the topic of the 1980 Summer Olympics, a 1989 Australian study said "There is hardly a medal winner at the Moscow Games, certainly not a gold medal winner, who is not on one sort of drug or another: usually several kinds. The Moscow Games might as well have been called the Chemists' Games."

Documents obtained in 2016 revealed the Soviet Union's plans for a statewide doping system in track and field in preparation for the 1984 Summer Olympics in Los Angeles. Dated prior to the country's decision to boycott the Games, the document detailed the existing steroids operations of the program, along with suggestions for further enhancements. The communication, directed to the Soviet Union's head of track and field, was prepared by Dr. Sergei Portugalov of the Institute for Physical Culture. Portugalov was also one of the main figures involved in the implementation of the Russian doping program prior to the 2016 Summer Olympics.

China was accused of conducting a state sanctioned doping programme on athletes in the 1980s and 1990s. In a July 2012 interview published by the Sydney Morning Herald newspaper, Chen Zhangho, the lead doctor for the Chinese Olympic team at the Los Angeles, Seoul and Barcelona Olympics told of how he had tested hormones, blood doping and steroids on about fifty elite athletes. Chen also accused the United States, the Soviet Union and France of using performance-enhancing drugs at the same time as China.

A very publicized steroid-related disqualification at an Olympic Games was the case of Canadian sprinter Ben Johnson, who won the Men's 100 metres at the 1988 Seoul Olympics, but tested positive for stanozolol. His gold medal was subsequently stripped and awarded to runner-up Carl Lewis, who had tested positive for stimulants at the U.S. Olympic Trials. The highest level of stimulant Lewis recorded was 6 ppm, which was regarded as a positive test in 1988 but is now regarded as a negative test. The acceptable level was later raised to ten parts per million for ephedrine and twenty-five parts per million for other substances. According to the IOC rules at the time, positive tests with levels lower than 10 ppm were cause of further investigation but not immediate ban. Neal Benowitz, a professor of medicine at UC San Francisco who is an expert on ephedrine and other stimulants, agreed that "These [levels] are what you'd see from someone taking cold or allergy medicines and are unlikely to have any effect on performance." The IAAF acknowledged that at the 1988 Olympic Trials the USOC followed the correct procedures in dealing with positive findings for ephedrine and ephedrine-related compounds in low concentration.

== Response ==
In the late 1990s, the IOC took the initiative in a more organized battle against doping, leading to the formation of the World Anti-Doping Agency (WADA) in 1999. The 2000 Summer Olympics and 2002 Winter Olympics have shown that the effort to eliminate performance-enhancing drugs from the Olympics is not over, as several medalists in weightlifting and cross-country skiing were disqualified due to failing a drug test. During the 2006 Winter Olympics, only one athlete failed a drug test and had a medal revoked. The IOC-established drug testing regimen (now known as the "Olympic Standard") has set the worldwide benchmark that other sporting federations attempt to emulate. During the Beijing games, 3,667 athletes were tested by the IOC under the auspices of the World Anti-Doping Agency. Both urine and blood testing was used in a coordinated effort to detect banned substances and recent blood transfusions. While several athletes were barred from competition by their National Olympic Committees prior to the Games, six athletes failed drug tests while in competition in Beijing.

== Summer Olympic Games ==
What follows is a list of all the athletes that have tested positive for a banned substance either during or after an Olympic Games in which they competed. Any medals listed were revoked by the International Olympic Commission (IOC). In 1967 the IOC banned the use of performance-enhancing drugs, instituted a Medical Commission, and created a list of banned substances. Mandatory testing began at the following year's Games. In a few cases the IOC has reversed earlier rulings that stripped athletes of medals.

=== 1968 Mexico City ===
Name	Country	Sport	Banned substance	Medals revoked
Hans-Gunnar Liljenwall	Sweden	Modern pentathlon	Ethanol	(bronze) (team)

In addition, the Bulgarian Greco-Roman wrestler Hristo Traykov was disqualified from his bout against David Hazewinkel for using concealed smelling salts during their bout.

=== 1972 Munich ===
As a 16-year-old, Rick DeMont qualified to represent the United States at the 1972 Summer Olympics in Munich, Germany. He originally won the gold medal in the men's 400-meter freestyle, but following the race, the International Olympic Committee (IOC) disqualified DeMont after his post-race urinalysis tested positive for traces of the banned substance ephedrine contained in his prescription asthma medication, Marax. The positive test following the 400-meter freestyle final also deprived him of a chance at multiple medals, as he was barred from any other events at the Olympics, including the 1,500-meter freestyle for which he was the then-current world record-holder.

Before the Olympics, DeMont had properly declared his asthma medications on his medical disclosure forms, but the U.S. Olympic Committee (USOC) had not cleared them with the IOC's medical committee. In 2001, his gold medal performance in the 1972 Summer Olympics was recognised by the United States Olympic Committee (USOC). However, only the IOC has the power to restore his medal, and it has, as of 2019, refused to do so.

Name	Country	Sport	Anti-doping rule violation	Medals revoked	Ref.
Bakaava Buidaa	Mongolia	Judo	Dianabol	(silver) (63 kg)	
Miguel Coll	Puerto Rico	Basketball	Amphetamine		
Rick DeMont	United States	Swimming	Ephedrine	(gold) (men's 400 m freestyle)	
Aad van den Hoek	Netherlands	Cycling	Coramine	(bronze) (100 km team race)	
Jaime Huélamo	Spain	Cycling	Coramine	(bronze) (individual road race)	
Walter Legel	Austria	Weightlifting	Amphetamine		
Mohammad Reza Nasehi	Iran	Weightlifting	Ephedrine		

=== 1976 Montreal ===
Name	Country	Sport	Anti-doping rule violation	Medals revoked	Ref.
Blagoi Blagoev	Bulgaria	Weightlifting	Anabolic steroid	(silver) (82.5 kg)	
Mark Cameron	United States	Weightlifting	Anabolic steroid		
Paul Cerutti	Monaco	Shooting	Amphetamine		
Dragomir Cioroslan	Romania	Weightlifting	Fencamfamine		
Phil Grippaldi	United States	Weightlifting	Anabolic steroid		
Zbigniew Kaczmarek	Poland	Weightlifting	Anabolic steroid	(gold) (67.5 kg)	
Valentin Khristov	Bulgaria	Weightlifting	Anabolic steroid	(gold) (110 kg)	
Lorne Leibel	Canada	Sailing	Phenylpropanolamine		
Arne Norrback	Sweden	Weightlifting	Anabolic steroid		
Petr Pavlasek	Czechoslovakia	Weightlifting	Anabolic steroid		
Danuta Rosani	Poland	Athletics	Anabolic steroid		

Leibel was disqualified from the race that took place on the day that he provided the positive sample but was allowed to continue in the event.

=== 1980 Moscow ===
Though no athletes were caught doping at the 1980 Summer Olympics, it has been revealed that athletes had begun using testosterone and other drugs for which tests had not been yet developed. According to British journalist Andrew Jennings, a KGB colonel stated that the agency's officers had posed as anti-doping authorities from the International Olympic Committee (IOC) to undermine doping tests and that Soviet athletes were "rescued with [these] tremendous efforts". A 1989 report by a committee of the Australian Senate claimed that "there is hardly a medal winner at the Moscow Games, certainly not a gold medal winner... who is not on one sort of drug or another: usually several kinds. The Moscow Games might well have been called the Chemists' Games".

A member of the IOC Medical Commission, Manfred Donike, privately ran additional tests with a new technique for identifying abnormal levels of testosterone by measuring its ratio to epitestosterone in urine. Twenty percent of the specimens he tested, including those from sixteen gold medalists would have resulted in disciplinary proceedings had the tests been official. The results of Donike's unofficial tests later convinced the IOC to add his new technique to their testing protocols. The first documented case of "blood doping" occurred at the 1980 Summer Olympics as a runner was transfused with two pints of blood before winning medals in the 5000 m and 10,000 m.

=== 1984 Los Angeles ===
Name	Country	Sport	Banned substance	Medals revoked	Ref.
Serafim Grammatikopoulos	Greece	Weightlifting	Nandrolone		
Vésteinn Hafsteinsson	Iceland	Athletics	Nandrolone		
Tomas Johansson	Sweden	Wrestling	Methenolone	(silver) (super-heavy)	
Stefan Laggner	Austria	Weightlifting	Nandrolone		
Göran Pettersson	Sweden	Weightlifting	Nandrolone		
Eiji Shimomura	Japan	Volleyball	Testosterone		
Mikiyasu Tanaka	Japan	Volleyball	Ephedrine		
Ahmed Tarbi	Algeria	Weightlifting	Nandrolone		
Mahmoud Tarha	Lebanon	Weightlifting	Nandrolone		
Giampaolo Urlando	Italy	Athletics	Testosterone		
Martti Vainio	Finland	Athletics	Methenolone	(silver) (10,000 m)	
Anna Verouli	Greece	Athletics	Nandrolone		

The organizers of the Los Angeles games had refused to provide the IOC doping authorities with a safe prior to the start of the games. Due to a lack of security, medical records were subsequently stolen. A 1994 letter from IOC Medical Commission chair Alexandre de Mérode claimed that Tony Daly, a member of the Los Angeles organizing committee had destroyed the records. Dick Pound later wrote of his frustration that the organizing committee had removed evidence before it could be acted on by the IOC. Pound also claimed that IOC President Juan Antonio Samaranch and Primo Nebiolo, President of the International Association of Athletics Federations (IAAF) had conspired to delay the announcement of positive tests so that the games could pass without controversy.

The American cyclist Pat McDonough later admitted to "blood doping" at the 1984 Los Angeles Games. Following the games it was revealed that one-third of the U.S. cycling team had received blood transfusions before the games, where they won nine medals, their first medal success since the 1912 Summer Olympics. "Blood doping" was banned by the IOC in 1985 (at the time of the Olympics it was not banned), though no test existed for it at the time.

=== 1988 Seoul ===
Name	Country	Sport	Banned substance	Medals revoked	Ref.
Ali Dad	Afghanistan	Wrestling	Furosemide		
Kerrith Brown	Great Britain	Judo	Furosemide	(bronze) (71 kg)	
Kalman Csengeri	Hungary	Weightlifting	Stanozolol		
Mitko Grablev	Bulgaria	Weightlifting	Furosemide	(gold) (56 kg)	
Angell Guenchev	Bulgaria	Weightlifting	Furosemide	(gold) (67.5 kg)	
Ben Johnson	Canada	Athletics	Stanozolol	(gold) (men's 100 m)	
Fernando Mariaca	Spain	Weightlifting	Pemoline		
Jorge Quesada	Spain	Modern pentathlon	Propranolol		
Andor Szanyi	Hungary	Weightlifting	Stanozolol	(silver) (100 kg)	
Alexander Watson	Australia	Modern Pentathlon	Caffeine		

=== 1992 Barcelona ===
Name	Country	Sport	Banned substance	Medals revoked	Details	Ref.
Madina Biktagirova	Unified Team	Athletics	Norephedrine			
Wu Dan	China	Volleyball	Strychnine			
Bonnie Dasse	United States	Athletics	Clenbuterol			
Andrew Davies	Great Britain	Weightlifting	Clenbuterol	Withdrawn prior to competition but later exonerated.		
Jason Livingston	Great Britain	Athletics	Anabolic steroid	Withdrawn prior to competition		
Jud Logan	United States	Athletics	Clenbuterol			
Nijolė Medvedeva	Lithuania	Athletics	Mesocarb			
Andrew Saxton	Great Britain	Weightlifting	Clenbuterol	Withdrawn prior to competition but later exonerated.		

=== 1996 Atlanta ===
Name	Country	Sport	Banned substance	Medals revoked	Ref.
Antonella Bevilacqua	Italy	Athletics	Ephedrine and pseudoephedrine		
Dean Capobianco	Australia	Athletics	Stanozolol		
Sandra Farmer-Patrick	United States	Athletics	Testosterone		
Daniel Plaza	Spain	Athletics	Nandrolone		
Iva Prandzheva	Bulgaria	Athletics	Metadienone		
Mary Slaney	United States	Athletics	Testosterone		
Natalya Shekhodanova	Russia	Athletics	Stanozolol		

Five athletes tested positive for the stimulant bromantan and were disqualified by the IOC, but later reinstated after an appeal to the Court of Arbitration for Sport: swimmers Andrey Korneyev and Nina Zhivanevskaya, Greco-Roman wrestler Zafar Guliev and sprinter Marina Trandenkova, all from Russia, and the Lithuanian track cyclist Rita Razmaitė. Dr. Vitaly Slionssarenko, physician to the Lithuanian cycling team and team coach Boris Vasilyev were expelled from the games by the IOC for their role in the scandal. The athletes and officials were reprimanded.

The Irish long-distance runner Marie McMahon (Davenport) got a reprimand after testing positive for the stimulant phenylpropanolamine, and Cuban judoka Estella Rodriguez Villanueva got a reprimand after she tested positive for the diuretic furosemide.

=== 2000 Sydney ===
Name	Country	Sport	Banned substance	Medals revoked	Ref.
Fritz Aanes	Norway	Wrestling	Norandrosterone and noretiochdandone		
Lance Armstrong	United States	Cycling (Road race and Time trial)	Investigation by U.S. Anti-Doping Agency concluded in 2012: Use, Possession, Trafficking, Administration of Prohibited Substances and Methods and Assisting, Encouraging, Aiding, Abetting, Covering Up, or any other type of complicity involving one or more anti-doping rule violations and/or attempted anti-doping rule violations.	(bronze) (Time trial)	
Ashot Danielyan	Armenia	Weightlifting	Stanozolol	(bronze) (+105 kg)	
Izabela Dragneva	Bulgaria	Weightlifting	Furosemide	(gold) (48 kg)	
Stian Grimseth	Norway	Weightlifting	Nandrolone		
Ivan Ivanov	Bulgaria	Weightlifting	Furosemide	(silver) (56 kg)	
Marion Jones	United States	Athletics	THG	(gold) (women's 100 m), (gold) (women's 200 m), (gold) (women's 4x400 m relay), (bronze) (women's long jump), (bronze) (women's 4x100 m relay)	
Alexander Leipold	Germany	Wrestling	Nandrolone	(gold) (76 kg)	
Sevdalin Minchev	Bulgaria	Weightlifting	Furosemide	(bronze) (62 kg)	
Antonio Pettigrew	United States	Athletics	EPO and HGH	(gold) (men's 4 × 400 m relay)	
Svetlana Pospelova	Russia	Athletics	Stanozolol		
Oyuunbilegiin Pürevbaatar	Mongolia	Wrestling	Furosemide		
Andreea Răducan	Romania	Gymnastics	Pseudophedrine	(gold) (women's individual all-round)	
Andris Reinholds	Latvia	Rowing	Nandrolone		
Jerome Young	United States	Athletics	Nandrolone	(gold) (men's 4 × 400 m relay)	

=== 2004 Athens ===
Name	Country	Sport	Anti-doping rule violation	Medals revoked	Ref.
Wafa Ammouri	Morocco	Weightlifting	Anabolic steroid		
Adrián Annus	Hungary	Athletics	Falsified test result, evasion of doping control	(gold) (men's hammer throw)	
Ludger Beerbaum	Germany	Equestrian	Betamethasone (to horse Goldfever)	(gold) (team jumping)	
Yuriy Bilonog	Ukraine	Athletics	Oxandrolone (positive after retest in 2012)	(gold) (men's shot put)	
Zhanna Block	Ukraine	Athletics	BALCO investigation		
Andrew Brack	Greece	Baseball	Stanozolol (pre-Games test)		
Viktor Chislean	Moldova	Weightlifting	Anabolic steroid		
Crystal Cox	United States	Athletics	Anabolic agents and hormones (investigation completed 2010)	(gold) (women's 4 × 400 m relay)	
Róbert Fazekas	Hungary	Athletics	Refused to submit sample	(gold) (men's discus throw)	
Mabel Fonseca	Puerto Rico	Wrestling	Stanozolol		
Anton Galkin	Russia	Athletics	Stanozolol		
Ferenc Gyurkovics	Hungary	Weightlifting	Oxandrolone	(silver) (105 kg)	
Tyler Hamilton	United States	Cycling	Use of prohibited substances and methods (self admission)	(gold) (men's road time trial)	
Marion Jones	United States	Athletics	BALCO investigation		
Zoltan Kecskes	Hungary	Weightlifting	Anabolic steroid		
Konstantinos Kenteris	Greece	Athletics	Evasion of doping control		
Albina Khomich	Russia	Weightlifting	Testosterone		
Aye Khine Nan	Myanmar	Weightlifting	Anabolic steroid		
Irina Korzhanenko	Russia	Athletics	Stanozolol	(gold) (women's shot put)	
Zoltán Kovács	Hungary	Weightlifting	Refused to submit sample		
Svetlana Krivelyova	Russia	Athletics	Oxandrolone (positive after retest in 2012)	(bronze) (women's shot put)	
Pratima Kumari Na	India	Weightlifting	Anabolic steroid		
Aleksey Lesnichiy	Belarus	Athletics	Clenbuterol		
David Munyasia	Kenya	Boxing	Cathine		
Derek Nicholson	Greece	Baseball	Diuretic (pre-Games test)		
Cian O'Connor	Ireland	Equestrian	Antipsychotics (to horse Waterford Crystal)	(gold) (individual jumping)	
Olena Olefirenko	Ukraine	Rowing	Ethamivan	(bronze) (women's quadruple sculls)	
Oleg Perepetchenov	Russia	Weightlifting	Clenbuterol (positive after retest in 2012)	(bronze) (77 kg)	
Duane Ross	United States	Athletics	BALCO investigation		
Leonidas Sampanis	Greece	Weightlifting	Testosterone	(bronze) (62 kg)	
Thinbaijam Sanamcha Chanu	India	Weightlifting	Furosemide		
Mital Sharipov	Kyrgyzstan	Weightlifting	Furosemide		
Olga Shchukina	Uzbekistan	Athletics	Clenbuterol		
Şule Şahbaz	Turkey	Weightlifting	Anabolic steroid		
Ekaterini Thanou	Greece	Athletics	Evasion of doping control		
Ivan Tsikhan	Belarus	Athletics	Methandienone (positive after retest in 2012)	(silver) (men's hammer throw)	
Irina Yatchenko	Belarus	Athletics	Methandienone (positive after retest in 2012)	(bronze) (women's discus throw) December 2012	

=== 2008 Beijing ===
"Zero Tolerance for Doping" was adopted as an official slogan for the Beijing Olympic Games. A number of athletes were already eliminated by testing prior to coming to Beijing.

Out of the 4,500 samples that were collected from participating athletes at the games, six athletes with positive specimens were ousted from the competition. The quality of the original testing was questioned when the BBC reported that samples positive for EPO were labeled as negative by Chinese laboratories in July 2008. The initial rate of positive findings was lower than at Athens in 2004, but the prevalence of doping had not necessarily decreased; the technology for creating and concealing drugs had become more sophisticated, and a number of drugs could not be detected. Chinese crackdowns on doping athletes in 2010 included a two-year ban on 2008 Olympic judo champion Tong Wen after she tested positive for clenbuterol.

In August 2015, the Turkish Athletics Federation confirmed that an in-competition test of Elvan Abeylegesse at the 2007 IAAF World Championships in Athletics had been retested and found to be positive for a controlled substance, and that she had been temporarily suspended. On 29 March 2017, the IAAF confirmed the positive test, announced retroactive disqualifications and voided all of her results from 25 August 2007 until 25 August 2009, including the 2008 Summer Olympics. As a result, she was stripped of two silver medals she had won in the women's 5,000 and 10,000 meter races.

In May 2016, following the Russian doping scandal, the IOC announced that 32 targeted retests had come back positive for performance-enhancing drugs, of which Russian News Agency TASS announced that 14 were from Russian athletes, 11 of them track and field athletes, including 2012 Olympic champion high jumper Anna Chicherova. Authorities have sent the B-samples for confirmation testing. Those confirmed as having taken doping agents stand to lose records and medals from the 2008 games to 2016 under IOC and WADA rules.

On 18 June 2016, the IWF reported that as a consequence of the IOC's reanalyses of samples from the 2008 Olympic Games, the samples of the following seven weightlifters had returned positive results: Hripsime Khurshudyan (Armenia), Intigam Zairov (Azerbaijan), Alexandru Dudoglo (Moldova), gold medalist Ilya Ilyin (Kazakhstan), bronze medalist Nadezda Evstyukhina and silver medalist Marina Shainova (both from Russia), and Nurcan Taylan (Turkey). In line with the relevant rules and regulations, the IWF imposed mandatory provisional suspensions upon the athletes. Zairov and Ilyin had been serving previous suspensions. In November 2016, Ilyin was stripped of the gold medal.

On 22 July 2016, Sibel Özkan (TUR) was disqualified due to an anti-doping rule violation and stripped of her silver medal. Medals have not been reallocated as yet.

On 28 July 2016, it was announced that retests of samples from the 2008 Summer Olympics detected a positive sample for performance-enhancing drugs from Aksana Miankova of Belarus, who won a gold medal in the women's hammer throw. There have been no decisions about stripping and reallocation of medals as yet.

On 16 August 2016, the Russian women's 4 × 100 metres relay team was disqualified for doping. Russian teammates were stripped of their gold Olympic medals, as Yuliya Chermoshanskaya had her samples reanalyzed and tested positive for two prohibited substances. The IAAF was requested to modify the results accordingly and to consider any further action within its own competence.

On 19 August 2016, the Russian women's 4 × 400 metres relay team was disqualified for doping. Russian teammates were stripped of their silver Olympic medals, as Anastasiya Kapachinskaya had her samples reanalyzed and tested positive for the same two prohibited substances as Chermoshanskaya.

On 24 August 2016, the IWF reported that as a consequence of the IOC's reanalyses of samples from the 2008 Olympic Games, the samples of the following athletes had returned positive results: Nizami Pashayev (Azerbaijan), Iryna Kulesha, Nastassia Novikava, Andrei Rybakou (all from Belarus), Cao Lei, Chen Xiexia, Liu Chunhong (all from China), Mariya Grabovetskaya, Maya Maneza, Irina Nekrassova, Vladimir Sedov (all from Kazakhstan), Khadzhimurat Akkaev, Dmitry Lapikov (both from Russia), and Natalya Davydova and Olha Korobka (both from Ukraine). In line with the relevant rules and regulations, the IWF imposed mandatory provisional suspensions upon the athletes, who remain provisionally suspended in view of potential anti-doping rule violations until their cases are closed.

On 29 August 2016, some non-official reports indicated that Artur Taymazov of Uzbekistan had been stripped of the 2008 Olympic gold medal in the freestyle wrestling 120 kg event due to a positive test for doping.

On 31 August 2016, the IOC disqualified six sportspeople for failing doping tests at the 2008 Games. They included three Russian medalists: weightlifters Nadezhda Evstyukhina (bronze medal in the women's 75 kg event), Marina Shainova (silver medal in the women's 58 kg event), and Tatyana Firova, who finished second with teammates in the 4 × 400 m relay. Bronze medal weightlifter Tigran Martirosyan of Armenia (men's 69 kg event) and fellow weightlifters Alexandru Dudoglo (9th place) of Moldova and Intigam Zairov (9th place) of Azerbaijan were also disqualified.

On 1 September 2016, the IOC disqualified a further two athletes. Cuban discus thrower Yarelys Barrios, who won a silver medal in the women's discus, was disqualified after testing positive for Acetazolamide and ordered to return her medal. Qatari sprinter Samuel Francis, who finished 16th in the 100 meters, was also disqualified after testing positive for Stanozolol.

On 13 September 2016, four more Russian athletes were disqualified for doping offenses. Two of those were medalists from the 2008 Summer Olympics: silver medalist Mariya Abakumova in the women's javelin throw and Denis Alekseyev, who was part of the bronze medal team in the men's 4 × 400 m relay. Inga Abitova, who finished 6th in the 10,000 meters, and cyclist Ekaterina Gnidenko also tested positive for a banned substance and were disqualified.

On 23 September 2016, some non-official reports indicate wrestler Vasyl Fedoryshyn of Ukraine has been stripped of the 2008 Olympic silver medal in the freestyle 60 kg event due to a positive test for doping.

On 6 October 2016, the IOC disqualified Anna Chicherova of the Russian Federation for testing positive for performance-enhancing drugs. She won a bronze medal in the women's high jump. Russia would likely keep the bronze medal, as the fourth-place athlete in the competition was also from Russia. Through 6 October 2016, the IOC has reported Adverse Analytical Findings for 25 weightlifters from its 2016 retests of samples from the 2008 Beijing Olympic Games, all but three of whom tested positive for anabolic agents (three Chinese weightlifters were positive for growth hormones).

On 26 October 2016, the IOC disqualified nine more athletes for failing drugs tests at the 2008 Games. Among them were six medal winners: weightlifters Andrei Rybakou and Nastassia Novikava, both from Belarus, and Olha Korobka of Ukraine; women's steeplechase bronze medalist Ekaterina Volkova of Russia; and freestyle wrestlers Soslan Tigiev of Uzbekistan and Taimuraz Tigiyev of Kazakhstan. The others were men's 62 kg weightlifter Sardar Hasanov of Azerbaijan, long jumper Wilfredo Martinez of Cuba, and 100m-hurdler Josephine Nnkiruka Onyia of Spain.

On 17 November 2016, the IOC disqualified 16 more athletes for failing drugs tests at the 2008 games. Among them were 10 medal winners: weightlifters Khadzhimurat Akkaev and Dmitry Lapikov and wrestler Khasan Baroev from the Russian Federation, weightlifters Mariya Grabovetskaya, Irina Nekrassova and wrestler Asset Mambetov from Kazakhstan, weightlifter Nataliya Davydova and pole vaulter Denys Yurchenko from Ukraine, long/triple jumper Hrysopiyí Devetzí of Greece and wrestler Vitaliy Rahimov of Azerbaijan. The others were women's 75 kg weightlifter Iryna Kulesha of Belarus, women's +63 kg weightlifter Maya Maneza of Kazakhstan, women's high jumper Vita Palamar of Ukraine, men's 94 kg weightlifter Nizami Pashayev of Azerbaijan, men's 85 kg weightlifter Vladimir Sedov of Kazakhstan, and women's high jumper Elena Slesarenko of the Russian Federation.

On 25 November 2016, the IOC disqualified 5 more athletes for failing drugs tests at the 2008 games. Among them were 3 medal winners: gold-medalists 94 kg weightlifter Ilya Ilin of Kazakhstan and hammer thrower Aksana Miankova of Belarus and silver-medalist shot putter Natallia Mikhnevich of Belarus. The others were shot putter Pavel Lyzhyn and 800m runner Sviatlana Usovich, both of Belarus.

On 12 January 2017, the IOC disqualified five more athletes for failing drug tests at the 2008 Games. These included three Chinese women's weightlifting gold medalists: Lei Cao (75 kg), Xiexia Chen (48 kg) and Chunhong Liu (69 kg). Two women athletes from Belarus were disqualified: bronze medalist shot putter Nadzeya Ostapchuk and hammer thrower Darya Pchelnik, who did not medal.

On 25 January 2017, the IOC stripped Jamaica of the athletics gold medal in the men's 4 × 100 m relay due to Nesta Carter testing positive for the prohibited substance methylhexaneamine. The IOC also stripped Russian jumper Tatyana Lebedeva of two silver medals in women's triple jump and long jump due to use of turinabol.

On 1 March 2017, the IOC disqualified Victoria Tereshchuk of Ukraine due to use of turinabol and stripped her of the bronze medal in modern pentathlon.

By April 2017, the 2008 Summer Olympics has had the most (50) Olympic medals stripped for doping violations. Russia is the leading country with 14 medals stripped.

==== Disqualified ====
Name	Country	Sport	Banned substance	Medals revoked	Details
Elvan Abeylegesse	Turkey	Athletics; 5000 Metres; 10,000 metres		(silver) (5,000 meters); (silver) (10,000 meters)	Disqualification following post-event testing for 2007 IAAF World Championships
Christian Ahlmann	Germany	Equestrian; Individual jumping Team jumping	Capsaicin		
Bernardo Alves	Brazil	Equestrian; Individual jumping Team jumping	Capsaicin		
Lyudmila Blonska	Ukraine	Athletics; Heptathlon	Methyltestosterone	(silver) (heptathlon)	IOC post-event testing
Tony André Hansen	Norway	Equestrian; Individual jumping Team jumping	Capsaicin	(bronze) (team jumping)	
Alissa Kallinikou	Cyprus	Athletics; 400 metres	Testosterone		In competition test in July 2008
Kim Jong-su	North Korea	Shooting; 10 m air pistol 50 m pistol	Propranolol	(bronze) (men's 10 m air pistol), (silver) (50 m pistol)	
Courtney King	United States	Equestrian; Individual dressage Team dressage	Felbinac		
Denis Lynch	Ireland	Equestrian; Individual jumping	Capsaicin		
Andrei Mikhnevich	Belarus	Athletics; Shot put	Retest of sample from 2005 WCh: Clenbuterol, Methandienone and Oxandrolone	(bronze) (men's shot put)	IAAF retest of sample from the 2005 IAAF World Championships. All results from August 2005 onwards annulled.
Tezdzhan Naimova	Bulgaria	Athletics; 100 metres	Tampering with doping control		IAAF out-of-competition test in June 2008.
Rodrigo Pessoa	Brazil	Equestrian; Individual jumping Team jumping	Nonivamide		
Igor Razoronov	Ukraine	Weightlifting; 105 kg	Nandrolone		
Adam Seroczyński	Poland	Canoeing; K-2 1000 metres	Clenbuterol		
Do Thi Ngan Thuong	Vietnam	Gymnastics; Artistic qualification	Furosemide		
Vanja Perisic	Croatia	Athletics; 800 Metres	CERA		IOC re-analysis of sample in 2009
Rashid Ramzi	Bahrain	Athletics; 1500 Metres	CERA	1st place, gold medalist(s)	IOC re-analysis of sample in 2009
Davide Rebellin	Italy	Cycling; Road Race	CERA	2nd place, silver medalist(s)	IOC re-analysis of sample in 2009
Stefan Schumacher	Germany	Cycling; Time Trial	CERA		IOC re-analysis of sample in 2009
Athanasia Tsoumeleka	Greece	Athletics; 20 Kilometre Walk	CERA		IOC re-analysis of sample in 2009
Yuliya Chermoshanskaya	Russia	Athletics; 200 Metres; 4 × 100 Metres Relay	Stanozolol & Turinabol	(gold) (4x100 metre relay)	IOC re-analysis of sample in 2016
Tatyana Firova	Russia	Athletics; 400 Metres; 4 × 400 Metres Relay	Turinabol & Metabolite of 1-Testosterone, 1-Androstenedione or 1-Androstenediol	(silver) (4×400 metre relay)	IOC re-analysis of sample in 2016
Anastasia Kapachinskaya	Russia	Athletics; 400 Metres; 4 × 400 Metres Relay	Stanozolol & Turinabol	(silver) (4x400 metre relay)	IOC re-analysis of sample in 2016
Hripsime Khurshudyan	Armenia	Weightlifting; 75 kg	Stanozolol		IOC re-analysis of sample in 2016
Tigran Gevorg Martirosyan	Armenia	Weightlifting; 69 kg	Stanozolol & Turinabol	3rd place, bronze medalist(s)	IOC re-analysis of sample in 2016
Samuel Adelebari Francis	Qatar	Athletics; 100 Metres; 200 Metres	Stanozolol		IOC re-analysis of sample in 2016
Nadezhda Evstyukhina	Russia	Weightlifting; 75 kg	Turinabol & EPO	3rd place, bronze medalist(s)	IOC re-analysis of sample in 2016
Alexander Pogorelov	Russia	Athletics; Decathlon	Turinabol		IOC re-analysis of sample in 2016
Marina Shainova	Russia	Weightlifting; 58 kg	Stanozolol and Turinabol	2nd place, silver medalist(s)	IOC re-analysis of sample in 2016
Alexandru Dudoglo	Moldova	Weightlifting; 69 kg	Stanozolol		IOC re-analysis of sample in 2016
Nurcan Taylan	Turkey	Weightlifting; 48 kg	Stanozolol		IOC re-analysis of sample in 2016
Yarelys Barrios	Cuba	Athletics; Discus Throw	Acetazolamide	2nd place, silver medalist(s)	IOC re-analysis of sample in 2016
Intigam Zairov	Azerbaijan	Weightlifting; 85 kg	Turinabol		IOC re-analysis of sample in 2016
Ivan Yushkov	Russia	Athletics; Shot Put	Stanozolol, Oxandrolone & Turinabol		IOC re-analysis of sample in 2016
Sibel Özkan	Turkey	Weightlifting; 48 kg	Stanozolol	2nd place, silver medalist(s)	IOC re-analysis of sample in 2016
Ilya Ilyin	Kazakhstan	Weightlifting; 94 kg	Stanozolol	1st place, gold medalist(s)	IOC re-analysis of sample in 2016
Mariya Abakumova	Russia	Athletics; Javelin Throw	Turinabol	2nd place, silver medalist(s)	IOC re-analysis of sample in 2016
Inga Abitova	Russia	Athletics; 10,000 Metres	Turinabol		IOC re-analysis of sample in 2016
Denis Alexeev	Russia	Athletics; 400 Metres	Turinabol		IOC re-analysis of sample in 2016
Anna Chicherova	Russia	Athletics; High Jump	Turinabol	3rd place, bronze medalist(s)	IOC re-analysis of sample in 2016
Sardar Hasanov	Azerbaijan	Weightlifting; 62 kg	Turinabol		IOC re-analysis of sample in 2016
Wilfredo Martínez	Cuba	Athletics; Long Jump	Acetazolamide		IOC re-analysis of sample in 2016
Josephine Nnkiruka Onyia	Spain	Athletics; 100 Metre Hurdles	Methylhexanamine		IOC re-analysis of sample in 2016
Soslan Tigiev	Uzbekistan	Wrestling; Freestyle 74 kg	Turinabol	2nd place, silver medalist(s)	IOC re-analysis of sample in 2016
Ekaterina Volkova	Russia	Athletics; 3000 Metre Steeplechase	Turinabol	3rd place, bronze medalist(s)	IOC re-analysis of sample in 2016
Olha Korobka	Ukraine	Weightlifting +75 kg	Turinabol	2nd place, silver medalist(s)	IOC re-analysis of sample in 2016
Nastassia Novikava	Belarus	Weightlifting; 53 kg	Turinabol & Stanozolol	3rd place, bronze medalist(s)	IOC re-analysis of sample in 2016
Andrei Rybakou	Belarus	Weightlifting; 85 kg	Stanozolol & Turinabol	2nd place, silver medalist(s)	IOC re-analysis of sample in 2016
Taimuraz Tigiyev	Kazakhstan	Wrestling; Freestyle 96 kg	Turinabol	2nd place, silver medalist(s)	IOC re-analysis of sample in 2016
Khadzhimurat Akkaev	Russia	Weightlifting; 94 kg	Turinabol	3rd place, bronze medalist(s)	IOC re-analysis of sample in 2016
Khasan Baroev	Russia	Wrestling; Greco-Roman 120 kg	Turinabol	2nd place, silver medalist(s)	IOC re-analysis of sample in 2016
Nataliya Davydova	Ukraine	Weightlifting; 69 kg	Turinabol	3rd place, bronze medalist(s)	IOC re-analysis of sample in 2016
Chrysopigi Devetzi	Greece	Athletics; Triple Jump	Stanozolol	3rd place, bronze medalist(s)	IOC re-analysis of sample in 2016
Mariya Grabovetskaya	Kazakhstan	Weightlifting +75 kg	Turinabol, Oxandrolone & Stanozolol	3rd place, bronze medalist(s)	IOC re-analysis of sample in 2016
Iryna Kulesha	Belarus	Weightlifting; 75 kg	Turinabol		IOC re-analysis of sample in 2016
Dmitry Lapikov	Russia	Weightlifting; 105 kg	Turinabol	3rd place, bronze medalist(s)	IOC re-analysis of sample in 2016
Asset Mambetov	Kazakhstan	Wrestling; Greco-Roman 96 kg	Stanozolol	3rd place, bronze medalist(s)	IOC re-analysis of sample in 2016
Maya Maneza	Kazakhstan	Weightlifting; 63 kg	Stanozolol		IOC re-analysis of sample in 2016
Irina Nekrassova	Kazakhstan	Weightlifting; 63 kg	Stanozolol	2nd place, silver medalist(s)	IOC re-analysis of sample in 2016
Vita Palamar	Ukraine	Athletics; High Jump	Turinabol		IOC re-analysis of sample in 2016
Nizami Pashayev	Azerbaijan	Weightlifting; 94 kg	Turinabol, Oxandrolone & Stanozolol		IOC re-analysis of sample in 2016
Vitaliy Rahimov	Azerbaijan	Wrestling; Greco-Roman 60 kg	Turinabol	2nd place, silver medalist(s)	IOC re-analysis of sample in 2016
Vladimir Sedov	Kazakhstan	Weightlifting; 85 kg	Stanozolol		IOC re-analysis of sample in 2016
Elena Slesarenko	Russia	Athletics; High Jump	Turinabol		IOC re-analysis of sample in 2016
Denys Yurchenko	Ukraine	Athletics; Pole Vault	Turinabol	3rd place, bronze medalist(s)	IOC re-analysis of sample in 2016
Pavel Lyzhyn	Belarus	Athletics; Shot Put	Turinabol		IOC re-analysis of sample in 2016
Aksana Miankova	Belarus	Athletics; Hammer Throw	Turinabol & Oxandrolone	1st place, gold medalist(s)	IOC re-analysis of sample in 2016
Natallia Mikhnevich	Belarus	Athletics; Shot Put	Metandienone & Stanozolol	2nd place, silver medalist(s)	IOC re-analysis of sample in 2016
Sviatlana Vusovich	Belarus	Athletics; 800 Metres	Turinabol		IOC re-analysis of sample in 2016
Nadzeya Ostapchuk	Belarus	Athletics; Shot Put	Turinabol & Tamoxifen	3rd place, bronze medalist(s)	IOC re-analysis of sample in 2017
Darya Pchelnik	Belarus	Athletics; Hammer Throw	Turinabol		IOC re-analysis of sample in 2017
Cao Lei	China	Weightlifting; 75 kg	GHRP-2 & Metabolite	1st place, gold medalist(s)	IOC re-analysis of sample in 2017
Chen Xiexia	China	Weightlifting; 48 kg	GHRP-2 & Metabolite	1st place, gold medalist(s)	IOC re-analysis of sample in 2017
Liu Chunhong	China	Weightlifting; 69 kg	GHRP-2, Metabolite & Sibutramine	1st place, gold medalist(s)	IOC re-analysis of sample in 2017
Nesta Carter	Jamaica	Athletics; 4 × 100 Metres Relay	Methylhexanamine	1st place, gold medalist(s)	IOC re-analysis of sample in 2017
Tatyana Lebedeva	Russia	Athletics; Triple Jump; Long Jump	Turinabol	2nd place, silver medalist(s)	IOC re-analysis of sample in 2017
Victoria Tereshchuk	Ukraine	Modern Pentathlon; Individual	Turinabol	3rd place, bronze medalist(s)	IOC re-analysis of sample in 2017
Vasyl Fedoryshyn	Ukraine	Wrestling; Freestyle 60 kg	Turinabol	2nd place, silver medalist(s)	IOC re-analysis of sample in 2017
Artur Taymazov	Uzbekistan	Wrestling; Freestyle 120 kg	Turinabol & Stanozolol	1st place, gold medalist(s)	IOC re-analysis of sample in 2017
Tatyana Chernova	Russia	Athletics; Heptathlon	Turinabol	3rd place, bronze medalist(s)	IOC re-analysis of sample in 2017
Denis Alexeev	Russia	Athletics; Men's 4 × 400 m relay	Turinabol	3rd place, bronze medalist(s)	IOC re-analysis of sample in 2017

==== Did not start ====
Athletes who were selected for the Games, but provisionally suspended before competing.

Name	Country	Sport	Banned substance	Details
Marta Bastianelli	Italy	Cycling	Fenfluramine	Testing at the U-23 world championships
Fani Halkia	Greece	Athletics	Methyltrienolone	Pre-Games testing in Japan
Maria Isabel Moreno	Spain	Cycling	Erythropoietin	Pre-Games testing in Olympic village, Beijing
Tatyana Tomashova	Russia	Athletics		IAAF out-of-competition tests in May and August 2007
Yelena Soboleva	Russia	Athletics		IAAF out-of-competition tests in May and August 2007
Svetlana Cherkasova	Russia	Athletics		IAAF out-of-competition tests in May and August 2007
Yuliya Fomenko	Russia	Athletics		IAAF out-of-competition tests in May and August 2007
Darya Pishchalnikova	Russia	Athletics		IAAF out-of-competition tests in May and August 2007
Gulfiya Khanafeyeva	Russia	Athletics		IAAF out-of-competition tests in May and August 2007
Olga Yegorova	Russia	Athletics		IAAF out-of-competition tests in May and August 2007

=== 2012 London ===
It was announced prior to the Summer games that half of all competitors would be tested for drugs, with 150 scientists set to take 6,000 samples between the start of the games and the end of the Paralympic games at GlaxoSmithKline's New Frontiers Science Park site in Harlow, Essex. All medalists would also be tested. The Olympic anti-doping laboratory would test up to 400 samples every day for more than 240 prohibited substances.

The head of the World Anti-Doping Agency (WADA), John Fahey, announced on 24 July that 107 athletes had been sanctioned for doping offences in the six months to 19 June. The "In-competition" period began on 16 July. During the "In-competition" period Olympic competitors can be tested at any time without notice or in advance.

British sprinter Dwain Chambers, cyclist David Millar and shot putter Carl Myerscough competed in London after the British Olympic Association's policy of punishing drug cheats with lifetime bans was overturned by the Court of Arbitration for Sport.

Russian Darya Pishchalnikova participated in the 2012 Olympics and was awarded a silver medal. However, she tested positive for the anabolic steroid oxandrolone in the samples taken in May 2012. In December 2012, she sent an email to WADA containing details on an alleged state-run doping program in Russia. According to The New York Times, the email reached three top WADA officials but the agency decided not to open an inquiry and instead sent her email to Russian sports officials. In April 2013 Pishchalnikova was banned by the Russian Athletics Federation for ten years, and her results from May 2012 were annulled, meaning she was set on track to lose her Olympic medal. Her ban by the Russian Athletics Federation was likely in retaliation.

Gold medalists at the games who had been involved in previous doping offences included Alexander Vinokourov, the winner of the men's road race, Tatyana Lysenko, the winner of the women's hammer throw, Aslı Çakır Alptekin winner of the women's 1500 meters and Sandra Perković, winner of the women's discus throw. Other competitors at the Summer games involved in previous doping cases included American athletes Justin Gatlin and LaShawn Merritt, and Jamaican sprinter Yohan Blake.

Spanish athlete Ángel Mullera was first selected for the 3000 m steeplechase and later removed when emails were published in which he discussed EPO use with a trainer. Mullera appealed to CAS which ordered the Spanish Olympic Committee to allow him to participate.

Prior to the Olympic competition, several prominent track and field athletes were ruled out of the competition due to failed tests. World indoor medallists Dimitrios Chondrokoukis, Debbie Dunn, and Mariem Alaoui Selsouli were withdrawn from their Olympic teams in July for doping, as was 2004 Olympic medallist Zoltán Kővágó. At the Olympic competition, Tameka Williams admitted to taking a banned stimulant and was removed from the games. Ivan Tsikhan did not compete in the hammer throw as a retest of his sample from the 2004 Athens Olympics, where he won silver, was positive. Amine Laâlou, Marina Marghieva, Diego Palomeque, and defending 50 km walk champion Alex Schwazer were also suspended before taking part in their events.

Syrian hurdler Ghfran Almouhamad became the first track-and-field athlete to be suspended following a positive in-competition doping sample. Nadzeya Astapchuk was stripped of the women's shot put title after her sample came back positive for the banned anabolic agent metenolone. Karin Melis Mey was withdrawn before the long jump final when an earlier failed doping test was confirmed.

A WADA report released in 2015 detailed an extensive Russian state-sponsored doping program implicating athletes, coaches, various Russian institutions, doctors and labs. The report stated that the London Olympic Games "were, in a sense, sabotaged by the admission of athletes who should have not been competing" and detailed incidents of bribery and bogus urine samples. The report recommended that Russia be barred from track and field events for the 2016 Olympics. It also recommended lifetime bans for five coaches and five athletes from the country, including runners Mariya Savinova, Ekaterina Poistogova, Anastasiya Bazdyreva, Kristina Ugarova, and Tatjana Myazina.

On 15 June 2016, it was announced that four London 2012 Olympic weightlifting champions had tested positive for performance-enhancing drugs. They include Kazakhstan's Ilya Ilyin (94 kg), Zulfiya Chinshanlo (53 kg), Maiya Maneza (63 kg) and Svetlana Podobedova (75 kg). If confirmed, Kazakhstan would drop from 12th to 23rd in the 2012 medal standings. Six other lifters who competed at the 2012 Games also tested positive after hundreds of samples were reanalysed. Among them are Russia's Apti Aukhadov (silver at 85 kg), Ukraine's Yuliya Kalina (bronze at 58 kg), Belarusian Maryna Shkermankova (bronze at 69 kg), Azerbaijan's Boyanka Kostova and Belarus duo Dzina Sazanavets and Yauheni Zharnasek. On 27 July 2016, IWF has reported in the second wave of re-sampling that three silver medalists from Russia, namely Natalya Zabolotnaya (at 75 kg), Aleksandr Ivanov (at 94 kg) and Svetlana Tsarukaeva (at 63 kg), together with bronze medalists Armenian Hripsime Khurshudyan (at 75+ kg), Belarusian Iryna Kulesha (at 75 kg) and Moldovan Cristina Iovu (at 53 kg) have tested positive for steroid dehydrochlormethyltestosterone. Aukhadov was stripped of his silver medal by the IOC on 18 October 2016. On 27 October 2016 Maiya Maneza was stripped of her gold medal. In November 2016, Ilyin was stripped of the London gold medal.

On 13 July 2016, the IOC announced that Yuliya Kalina of Ukraine had been disqualified from the 2012 Summer Olympics and ordered to return the bronze medal from the 58 kg weightlifting event. Reanalysis of Kalina's samples from London 2012 resulted in a positive test for the prohibited substance dehydrochlormethyltestosterone (turinabol). The positions were adjusted accordingly.

On 9 August 2016, the IOC announced that Oleksandr Pyatnytsya of Ukraine would be stripped of his silver medal in the javelin throw after he tested positive for the prohibited substance dehydrochlormethyltestosterone (turinabol). Redistribution of medals has not yet been announced, but the likely case is the silver and bronze medals will be given to Finland and Czech Republic instead.

On 20 August 2016, the IOC announced that Yevgeniya Kolodko of Russia would be stripped of her silver medal in shot put after she tested positive of dehydrochlormethyltestosterone (turinabol) and ipamorelin. Medals are not reallocated yet.

On 29 August 2016, a report indicated that a retested sample for Besik Kudukhov of Russia, the silver medalist in the men's 60 kg freestyle wrestling event, had returned a positive result (later disclosed as dehydrochlormethyltestosterone). Kudakhov died in a car crash in December 2013. On 27 October 2016, the IOC dropped all disciplinary proceedings against Kudukhov, stating that such proceedings cannot be conducted against a deceased person. As a result, it said, Olympic results that would have been reviewed will remain uncorrected, which is the unavoidable consequence of the fact that the proceedings cannot move forward.

On 13 September 2016, the IWF reported that the men's 94 kg weightlifting bronze medalist, Moldova's Anatolie Cîrîcu, had tested positive for the dehydrochlormethyltestosterone.

On 6 October 2016, the IWF reported that as a consequence of the IOC's reanalyses of samples from the 2012 Olympic Games, a sample of Norayr Vardanyan, who represented Armenia, had returned a positive result. In line with the relevant rules and regulations, the IWF imposed mandatory provisional suspensions upon Vardanyan, who remains provisionally suspended until his case is closed. On 12 January 2017, the IOC disqualified Vardanyan. Through 6 October 2016, the IOC had reported Adverse Analytical Findings for 23 weightlifters from its 2016 retests of samples from the 2012 London Olympic Games, all of whom tested positive for anabolic agents.

On 11 October 2016, Tatyana Lysenko of the Russian Federation was disqualified from the women's hammer throw, in which she won the gold medal. She had tested positive for a banned substance. The IOC requested the IAAF to modify the results of this event accordingly. The silver medalist Anita Włodarczyk of Poland would likely take the gold medal in her place.

On 18 October 2016, the IOC disqualified Apti Aukhadov of the Russian Federation for doping and stripped him of the silver medal. The IOC requested the IWF to modify the results of this event accordingly; it has not yet published modified results.

On 18 October 2016, the IOC reported that Maksym Mazuryk of Ukraine, who competed in the Men's Pole Vault event, was disqualified from the 2012 London Games, in which he ranked 18th. Re-analysis of Mazuryk's samples resulted in a positive test for dehydrochlormethyltestosterone.

On 27 October 2016 the IOC disqualified a further eight athletes for failing doping tests at the games. This included four medal winners in weightlifting: Zulfiya Chinshanlo, Maiya Maneza and Svetlana Podobedova, all from Kazakhstan, and Maryna Shkermankova of Belarus. The others were hammer thrower Kirill Ikonnikov of Russia, women's 69 kg weightlifter Dzina Sazanavets of Belarus, pole vaulter Dmitry Starodubtsev of Russia, and men's +105 kg weightlifter Yauheni Zharnasek of Belarus.

On 21 November 2016 the IOC disqualified a further 12 athletes for failing doping tests at the games. This included 6 medal winners in weightlifting, including Alexandr Ivanov (Russia), Anatoli Ciricu (Moldova), Cristina Iovu (Moldova), Natalya Zabolotnaya (Russia), Iryna Kulesha (Belarus), and Hripsime Khurshudyan (Armenia). Moldova has lost all its 2012 London medals. The others were hammer thrower Oleksandr Drygol and long jumper Margaryta Tverdokhlib, both of Ukraine, 85 kg weightlifter Rauli Tsirekidze of Georgia, 94 kg weightlifter Almas Uteshov of Kazakhstan, 94 kg weightlifter Andrey Demanov of Russia and 3000m steeplechaser Yuliya Zaripova of Russia, who had previously been sanctioned in March 2016 by the Court of Arbitration for Sport.

On 25 November 2016, the IOC disqualified 4 more athletes for failing drug tests at the 2012 games. They were gold medalist 94 kg weightlifter Ilya Ilin of Kazakhstan, hammer thrower Aksana Miankova and long jumper Nastassia Mironchyk-Ivanova, both of Belarus, and 58 kg weightlifter Boyanka Kostova of Azerbaijan.

On 29 November 2016 the Court of Arbitration for Sport issued a decision that all results achieved by 2012 Olympic heptathlon bronze medalist Tatyana Chernova of Russia between 15 August 2011 and 22 July 2013 are annulled. It also annulled all of Yekaterina Sharmina's results between 17 June 2011 and 5 August 2015, including her 33rd-place finish in the 2012 women's 1500m. CAS ruled that they "have been found to have committed an anti-doping rule violation ... of the International Athletic Association Federation (IAAF) Competition Rules after analysis of their Athlete Biological Passports (ABP) showed evidence of blood doping."

On 12 January 2017, the IOC disqualified three weightlifters for failing drug tests at the 2012 games. Two competed in men's 94 kg weightlifting: Intigam Zairov of Azerbaijan and Norayr Vardanyan of Armenia. Women's 63 kg weightlifter Sibel Simsek of Turkey was disqualified. None was a medalist at these games.

On 1 February 2017, the IOC disqualified three athletes due to failed doping tests, all of whom tested positive for turinabol. Russian women's discus thrower Vera Ganeeva, who finished 23rd, Turkish boxer Adem Kilicci, who ranked 5th in men's 69–75 kg boxing, and Russian 400m runner Antonina Krivoshapka, who finished 6th, were disqualified. Krivoshapka also was part of the Russian silver medal-winning women's 4 × 400 m relay team, which was stripped of the silver medals.

In December 2014, a documentary aired on German TV in which 800m gold medalist Mariya Savinova allegedly admitted to using banned substances on camera. In November 2015, Savinova was one of five Russian runners the World Anti-Doping Agency recommended to receive a lifetime ban for doping during the London Olympics, along with 800m bronze medalist Ekaterina Poistogova. On 10 February 2017, the Court of Arbitration for Sport upheld a four-year ban that effectively stripped Savinova of her Olympic gold and other medals. On 7 April 2017, CAS refused to decide on disqualification from 2012, and disqualify Ekaterina Poistogova from 2015. Thus, Ekaterina Poistogova retained her Olympic 2012 medal at women's 800 metres athletic event. In 2024, the Russian Athleteics Federation cancelled Poistogova's results from July 2012 to October 2014 after analysing old samples. Poistogova was then stripped of the Olympic 800m silver medal. On 6 June 2025, the Court of Arbitration for Sport dismissed the appeal by Poistogova (now Guliyev), thereby officially revoking her medal.

As of December 2022, the 2012 Summer Olympics has seen a record 40 Olympic medals stripped for doping violations. Russia is the leading country with 17 medals stripped.

On 21 March 2022, the Athletics Integrity Unit of World Athletics issued a two-year ban for Russian racewalker Elena Lashmanova, starting from 9 March 2021, and also disqualified her results from 18 February 2012, to 3 January 2014, thus stripping her gold medal.

==== Disqualified ====
Name	Country	Sport	Banned substance	Medals revoked	Details of test
Hussain Al-Hamdah	Saudi Arabia	Athletics; 5000 metres	Biological passport abnormalities		IAAF sanction imposed 2013 w/results annulled from 26 March 2009 onwards.
Gamze Bulut	Turkey	Athletics; 1500 metres	Biological passport abnormalities	2nd place, silver medalist(s)	IAAF sanction imposed in 2017
Mariya Savinova	Russia	Athletics; 800 metres	Biological passport abnormalities	1st place, gold medalist(s)	CAS confirmed all results annulled from July 2010 to August 2013
Ghfran Almouhamad	Syria	Athletics; 400 metres hurdles	Methylhexaneamine		IOC pre-competition testing at 2012 Summer Olympics
Elena Arzhakova	Russia	Athletics; 800 metres	Biological passport abnormalities		IAAF sanction imposed 2013 w/results annulled from 12 July 2011 onwards.
Sergey Bakulin	Russia	Athletics; 50 km race walk	Biological passport abnormalities		IAAF/CAS sanction imposed 2016 w/results annulled from 25 February 2011 to 24 December 2012.
Andrey Krivov	Russia	Athletics; 20 km race walk	Biological passport abnormalities		IAAF/CAS sanction imposed 2017 w/ results annulled from 20 May 2011 to 6 July 2013
Valeriy Borchin	Russia	Athletics; 20 km race walk	Biological passport abnormalities		IAAF/CAS sanction imposed 2016 w/results annulled from 14 August 2009 to 15 October 2012.
Abderrahime Bouramdane	Morocco	Athletics; Marathon	Biological passport abnormalities		IAAF sanction imposed 2015 w/results annulled from 14 April 2011 onwards.
Yolanda Caballero	Colombia	Athletics; Marathon	Biological passport abnormalities		IAAF sanction imposed 2014 w/results annulled from 24 October 2011 onwards.
Aslı Çakır-Alptekin	Turkey	Athletics; 1500 metres	Biological passport abnormalities	1st place, gold medalist(s)	IAAF/CAS sanction imposed 2015 w/results annulled from 29 July 2010 onwards.
Yekaterina Sharmina	Russia	Athletics; 1500 metres	Biological passport abnormalities		IAAF/CAS sanction imposed 2016 w/ results annulled from 17 June 2011 to 5 August 2015
Nicholas Delpopolo	United States	Judo; 73 kg	Cannabis		IOC post-event testing at 2012 Summer Olympics.
Bahar Doğan	Turkey	Athletics; Marathon	Biological passport abnormalities		IAAF sanction imposed 2015 w/results annulled from 3 June 2011 onwards.
Marta Domínguez	Spain	Athletics; Steeplechase	Biological passport abnormalities		IAAF/CAS sanction imposed 2015 w/results annulled from 5 August 2009 onwards.
Hamza Driouch	Qatar	Athletics; 1500 metres	Biological passport abnormalities		IAAF sanction imposed 2015 w/results annulled from 2 August 2012 onwards.
Tyson Gay	United States	Athletics; 100 metres 4 × 100 meters	Anabolic androgenic steroids	(silver) (4 × 100 meters)	USADA investigation after positive for anabolic androgenic steroids in 2013; admittance.
Yelizaveta Grechishnikova	Russia	Athletics; 10,000 metres	Biological passport abnormalities		IAAF sanction imposed 2013 w/results annulled from 18 August 2009 onwards.
Semoy Hackett	Trinidad and Tobago	Athletics; 100 metres 200 metres 4 × 100 metres relay	Methylhexaneamine		Positive from Division I Outdoor Track & Field Championships in June 2012
Tetyana Hamera-Shmyrko	Ukraine	Athletics; Marathon	Biological passport abnormalities		IAAF sanction imposed 2015 w/results annulled from 26 August 2011 onwards.
Hassan Hirt	France	Athletics; 5000 metres	EPO		IOC pre-Games testing.
Vladimir Kanaikin	Russia	Athletics; 20 km race walk	Biological passport abnormalities		IAAF/CAS sanction imposed 2016 w/results annulled from 25 February 2011 to 17 December 2012.
Olga Kaniskina	Russia	Athletics; 20 km race walk	Biological passport abnormalities	2nd place, silver medalist(s)	IAAF/CAS sanction imposed 2016 w/results annulled from 15 August 2009 to 15 October 2012.
Natallia Kareiva	Belarus	Athletics; 1500 metres	Biological passport abnormalities		IAAF sanction imposed 2014 w/results annulled from 28 July 2010 onwards.
Ümmü Kiraz	Turkey	Athletics; Marathon	Biological passport abnormalities		IAAF sanction imposed 2015 w/results annulled from 3 June 2011 onwards.
Sergey Kirdyapkin	Russia	Athletics; 50 km race walk	Biological passport abnormalities	1st place, gold medalist(s)	IAAF/CAS sanction imposed 2016 w/results annulled from 20 August 2009 to 15 October 2012.
Blaža Klemenčič	Slovenia	Cycling; MTB	EPO		UCI reanalysis of sample from 27 March 2012 in 2015. All results annulled from 27 March 2012 until 31 December 2012.
Yekaterina Kostetskaya	Russia	Athletics; 1500 metres	Biological passport abnormalities		IAAF sanction imposed 2014 w/results annulled from 30 August 2011 onwards.
Zalina Marghieva	Moldova	Athletics; Hammer throw	2009 WCh retest: Stanozolol, Oral Turinabol		IAAF retesting of samples from 2009 IAAF World Championships
Karin Melis Mey	Turkey	Athletics; Long jump	Testosterone		Positive from the 2012 European Athletics Championships in June. Provisionally suspended after the qualifying round at the Games.
Andrei Mikhnevich	Belarus	Athletics; Shot put	2005 WCh retest: Clenbuterol, Methandienone and Oxandrolone		IAAF retest of sample from the 2005 IAAF World Championships. All results from August 2005 onwards annulled.
Anna Mishchenko	Ukraine	Athletics; 1500 m	Biological passport abnormalities		IAAF sanction imposed 2015 w/results annulled from 28 June 2012 onwards.
Andriy Semenov	Ukraine	Athletics; Shot put	Re-analysis of sample taken in 2011		AIU sanction imposed 2019
Semiha Mutlu	Turkey	Athletics; 20 km race walk	Biological passport abnormalities		IAAF sanction imposed 2015 w/results annulled from 20 August 2011 onwards.
Nadzeya Ostapchuk	Belarus	Athletics; Shot put	Methenolone	1st place, gold medalist(s)	IOC post-event testing at 2012 Summer Olympics (two separate positive samples).
Darya Pishchalnikova	Russia	Athletics; Discus throw	Oxandrolone	2nd place, silver medalist(s)	Random out of competition test in May 2012. All her results (Including those at the 2012 Summer Olympics) since May 2012 were annulled by the IAAF in April 2013.
Hysen Pulaku	Albania	Weightlifting; 77 kg	Stanozolol		IOC pre-competition testing at 2012 Summer Olympics.
Meliz Redif	Turkey	Athletics; 4 x 400 metres	Biological passport abnormalities		IAAF sanction imposed 2015 w/results annulled from 26 June 2012 onwards.
Pınar Saka	Turkey	Athletics; 400 metres 4 x 400 metres	Biological passport abnormalities		IAAF sanction imposed 2014 w/results annulled from 18 June 2010 onwards.
Mohammed Shaween	Saudi Arabia	Athletics; 1500 metres	Biological passport abnormalities		IAAF sanction imposed 2014 w/results annulled from 12 June 2011 onwards.
Anzhelika Shevchenko	Ukraine	Athletics; 1500 metres	Biological passport abnormalities		IAAF sanction imposed 2013 w/results annulled from 2 July 2011 onwards.
Liliya Shobukhova	Russia	Athletics; Marathon	Biological passport abnormalities		IAAF sanction imposed 2015 w/results annulled from 9 October 2009 onwards.
Svitlana Shmidt	Ukraine	Athletics; Steeplechase	Biological passport abnormalities		IAAF sanction imposed 2015 w/results annulled from 8 March 2012 onwards.
Soslan Tigiev	Uzbekistan	Wrestling; Freestyle 74 kg	Methylhexaneamine	3rd place, bronze medalist(s)	IOC post-event testing at 2012 Summer Olympics.
Binnaz Uslu	Turkey	Athletics; Steplechase	2011 WCh retest: Stanozolol		IAAF retest of sample from 2011 World Championships
Wang Jiali	China	Athletics; Marathon	Biological passport abnormalities		IAAF sanction imposed 2014 w/results annulled from 29 May 2012 onwards.
Nevin Yanit	Turkey	Athletics; 100 metres hurdles	Biological passport abnormalities		IAAF/CAS sanction imposed 2015 w/results annulled from 28 June 2012 onwards.
Igor Yerokhin	Russia	Athletics; 50 km walk	Biological passport abnormalities		IAAF sanction imposed 2013 w/results annulled from 25 February 2011 onwards.
Lyudmyla Yosypenko	Ukraine	Athletics; Heptathlon	Biological passport abnormalities		IAAF sanction imposed 2013 w/results annulled from 25 August 2011 onwards.
Dilshod Nazarov	Tajikistan	Athletics; Hammer Throw	Turinabol		AIU sanction imposed 2021 w/results annulled from 29 August 2011 to 29 August 2013
Olga Beresnyeva	Ukraine	Swimming; Open water	EPO		IOC re-analysis of sample in 2015
Yuliya Kalina	Ukraine	Weightlifting; 58 kg	Turinabol	3rd place, bronze medalist(s)	IOC re-analysis of sample in 2016.
Pavel Kryvitski	Belarus	Athletics; Hammer throw	Turinabol & Stanozolol		IOC re-analysis of sample in 2016
Oleksandr Pyatnytsya	Ukraine	Athletics; Javelin throw	Turinabol	2nd place, silver medalist(s)	IOC re-analysis of sample in 2016
Yuliya Zaripova	Russia	Athletics; 3000 Metres Steeplechase	Turinabol	1st place, gold medalist(s)	IOC re-analysis of sample in 2016
Maiya Maneza	Kazakhstan	Weightlifting; 63 kg	Stanozolol	1st place, gold medalist(s)	IOC re-analysis of sample in 2016
Zulfiya Chinshanlo	Kazakhstan	Weightlifting; 53 kg	Stanozolol & Oxandrolone	1st place, gold medalist(s)	IOC re-analysis of sample in 2016
Svetlana Podobedova	Kazakhstan	Weightlifting; 75 kg	Stanozolol	1st place, gold medalist(s)	IOC re-analysis of sample in 2016
Yevgeniya Kolodko	Russia	Athletics; Shot Put	Turinabol & Ipamorelin	2nd place, silver medalist(s)	IOC re-analysis of sample in 2016
Ekaterina Gnidenko	Russia	Cycling; Keirin	Turinabol		IOC re-analysis of sample in 2016
Tatyana Lysenko	Russia	Athletics; Hammer Throw	Turinabol	1st place, gold medalist(s)	IOC re-analysis of sample in 2016
Apti Aukhadov	Russia	Weightlifting; 85 kg	Turinabol & Drostanolone	2nd place, silver medalist(s)	IOC re-analysis of sample in 2016
Maksym Mazuryk	Ukraine	Athletics; Pole Vault	Turinabol		IOC re-analysis of sample in 2016
Kirill Ikonnikov	Russia	Athletics; Hammer Throw	Turinabol		IOC re-analysis of sample in 2016
Dzina Sazanavets	Belarus	Weightlifting; 69 kg	Drostanolone & Stanozolol		IOC re-analysis of sample in 2016
Maryna Shkermankova	Belarus	Weightlifting; 69 kg	Turinabol & Stanozolol	3rd place, bronze medalist(s)	IOC re-analysis of sample in 2016
Dmitry Starodubtsev	Russia	Athletics; Pole Vault	Turinabol		IOC re-analysis of sample in 2016
Yauheni Zharnasek	Belarus	Weightlifting +105 kg	Turinabol, Oxandrolone & Stanozolol		IOC re-analysis of sample in 2016
Ruslan Albegov	Russia	Weightlifting +105 kg	prohibited substance or method	3rd place, bronze medalist(s)	IWF charged in 2017 for use or attempted use of a prohibited substance or method. The IWF suspended Albegov in 2020. He had been the only Russian male weightlifter still in possession of a medal from London 2012.
Irakli Turmanidze	Georgia	Weightlifting +105 kg	one or multiple anabolic steroids		ITA re-analysis of sample announced in 2021
Besik Kudukhov	Russia	Wrestling; Freestyle 60 kg	Turinabol	(silver) (medal retained due to athlete's death in December 2013)	IOC re-analysis of sample in 2016
Andrey Demanov	Russia	Weightlifting; 94 kg	Turinabol		IOC re-analysis of sample in 2016
Oleksandr Drygol	Ukraine	Athletics; Hammer Throw	Turinabol		IOC re-analysis of sample in 2016
Cristina Iovu	Moldova	Weightlifting; 53 kg	Turinabol	3rd place, bronze medalist(s)	IOC re-analysis of sample in 2016
Aleksandr Ivanov	Russia	Weightlifting; 94 kg	Turinabol & Tamoxifen	2nd place, silver medalist(s)	IOC re-analysis of sample in 2016
Hripsime Khurshudyan	Armenia	Weightlifting +75 kg	Turinabol & Stanozolol	3rd place, bronze medalist(s)	IOC re-analysis of sample in 2016
Iryna Kulesha	Belarus	Weightlifting; 75 kg	Turinabol & Stanozolol	3rd place, bronze medalist(s)	IOC re-analysis of sample in 2016
Rauli Tsirekidze	Georgia	Weightlifting; 85 kg	Turinabol & Stanozolol		IOC re-analysis of sample in 2016
Marharyta Tverdokhlib	Ukraine	Athletics; Long Jump	Turinabol & Stanozolol		IOC re-analysis of sample in 2016
Almas Uteshov	Kazakhstan	Weightlifting; 94 kg	Turinabol & Stanozolol		IOC re-analysis of sample in 2016
Natalya Zabolotnaya	Russia	Weightlifting; 75 kg	Turinabol	2nd place, silver medalist(s)	IOC re-analysis of sample in 2016
Anatolie Cîrîcu	Moldova	Weightlifting; 94 kg	Turinabol	3rd place, bronze medalist(s)	IOC re-analysis of sample in 2016
Ilya Ilyin	Kazakhstan	Weightlifting; 94 kg	Turinabol & Stanozolol	1st place, gold medalist(s)	IOC re-analysis of sample in 2016
Aksana Miankova	Belarus	Athletics; Hammer Throw	Turinabol & Stanozolol		IOC re-analysis of sample in 2016
Nastassia Mironchyk-Ivanova	Belarus	Athletics; Long Jump	Turinabol		IOC re-analysis of sample in 2016
Boyanka Kostova	Azerbaijan	Weightlifting; 58 kg	Turinabol & Stanozolol		IOC re-analysis of sample in 2016
Sibel Simsek	Turkey	Weightlifting; 63 kg	Turinabol & Stanozolol		IOC re-analysis of sample in 2017
Intigam Zairov	Azerbaijan	Weightlifting; 94 kg	Turinabol		IOC re-analysis of sample in 2017
Norayr Vardanyan	Armenia	Weightlifting; 94 kg	Turinabol		IOC re-analysis of sample in 2017
Vera Ganeeva	Russia	Athletics; Discus Throw	Turinabol		IOC re-analysis of sample in 2017
Adem Kilicci	Turkey	Boxing; Middleweight	Turinabol		IOC re-analysis of sample in 2017
Antonina Krivoshapka	Russia	Athletics; 400 Metres; 4 x 400 Metres Relay	Turinabol	(silver) (4 x 400 metres)	IOC re-analysis of sample in 2017
Mariya Bespalova	Russia	Athletics; Hammer Throw	Turinabol		IOC re-analysis of sample in 2017
Khadzhimurat Akkaev	Russia	Weightlifting; 105 kg	Turinabol		IOC re-analysis of sample in 2017 Akkaev and Dmitry Klokov were on the start list but did not compete.
Gulfiya Khanafeyeva	Russia	Athletics; Hammer Throw	Turinabol		IOC re-analysis of sample in 2017
Victoria Valyukevich	Russia	Athletics; Triple Jump	Turinabol		IOC re-analysis of sample in 2017
Svetlana Tsarukaeva	Russia	Weightlifting; 63 kg	Turinabol	2nd place, silver medalist(s)	IOC re-analysis of sample in 2017
Maksim Dyldin	Russia	Athletics; 400 Metres; 4 x 400 Metres Relay	Turinabol		IOC re-analysis of sample in 2017
Tatyana Chernova	Russia	Athletics; Heptathlon	Turinabol	3rd place, bronze medalist(s)	IOC re-analysis of sample in 2017
Anna Nazarova	Russia	Athletics; Long Jump	Turinabol		IOC re-analysis of sample in 2017
Yulia Gushchina	Russia	Athletics; 400 Metres; 4 x 400 Metres Relay	Turinabol & Stanozolol	(silver) (4 x 400 metres)	IOC re-analysis of sample in 2017
Davit Modzmanashvili	Georgia	Wrestling; Freestyle 120 kg	Turinabol	2nd place, silver medalist(s)	IOC re-analysis of sample in 2019
Valentin Hristov	Azerbaijan	Weightlifting; 56 kg	Turinabol	3rd place, bronze medalist(s)	IOC re-analysis of sample in 2019
Alena Matoshka	Belarus	Athletics; Hammer Throw	Oxandrolone		IOC re-analysis of sample in 2019
Anis Ananenka	Belarus	Athletics; 800 Metres	Turinabol		IOC re-analysis of sample in 2019
Meline Daluzyan	Armenia	Weightlifting; 69 kg	Turinabol & Stanozolol		IOC re-analysis of sample in 2019
Ineta Radēviča	Latvia	Athletics; Long Jump	Oxandrolone		IOC re-analysis of sample in 2019
Florin Croitoru	Romania	Weightlifting; 56 kg	Turinabol, Metenolone & Stanozolol		IOC re-analysis of sample in 2019
Jevgenij Shuklin	Lithuania	Canoeing; C-1 200 Metres	Turinabol	2nd place, silver medalist(s)	IOC re-analysis of sample in 2019
Artur Taymazov	Uzbekistan	Wrestling; Freestyle 120 kg	Turinabol	1st place, gold medalist(s)	IOC re-analysis of sample in 2019
Oleksiy Torokhtiy	Ukraine	Weightlifting; 105 kg	Turinabol	1st place, gold medalist(s)	IOC re-analysis of sample in 2019
Klodiana Shala	Albania	Athletics; 200 Metres	Stanozolol		IOC re-analysis of sample in 2020
Gülcan Mıngır	Turkey	Athletics; 3000 Metres Steeplechase	Turinabol		IOC re-analysis of sample in 2020
Mete Binay	Turkey	Weightlifting; 69 kg	Stanozolol		IOC re-analysis of sample in 2020
Erol Bilgin	Turkey	Weightlifting; 62 kg	Turinabol & Stanozolol		IOC re-analysis of sample in 2020
Răzvan Martin	Romania	Weightlifting; 69 kg	Turinabol, Metenolone & Stanozolol	3rd place, bronze medalist(s)	IOC re-analysis of sample in 2020
Roxana Cocoș	Romania	Weightlifting; 69 kg	Metenolone & Stanozolol	2nd place, silver medalist(s)	IOC re-analysis of sample in 2020
Gabriel Sincraian	Romania	Weightlifting; 85 kg	Metenolone & Stanozolol		IOC re-analysis of sample in 2020
Tatyana Firova	Russia	Athletics; 4 x 400 Metres Relay		2nd place, silver medalist(s)	CAS decision imposed in 2019
Svetlana Shkolina	Russia	Athletics; High Jump		3rd place, bronze medalist(s)	CAS decision imposed in 2019
Ivan Ukhov	Russia	Athletics; High Jump		1st place, gold medalist(s)	CAS decision imposed in 2019
Lyukman Adams	Russia	Athletics; Triple Jump			CAS decision imposed in 2019
Yekaterina Galitskaya	Russia	Athletics; 100 Metres Hurdles			CAS decision imposed in 2019
Yuliya Kondakova	Russia	Athletics; 100 Metres Hurdles			CAS decision imposed in 2019
Ruslan Nurudinov	Uzbekistan	Weightlifting; 105 kg	Turinabol		CAS decision imposed in 2019
Mikalai Novikau	Belarus	Weightlifting; 85 kg	Turinabol & Stanozolol		CAS decision imposed in 2019
Elena Lashmanova	Russia	Athletics; 20 km race walk		1st place, gold medalist(s)	AIU decision imposed in 2022
Irina Tarasova	Russia	Athletics; Shot Put			AIU decision imposed in 2022
Natalya Antyukh	Russia	Athletics; Women's 400 m hurdles		1st place, gold medalist(s)	AIU decision imposed in 2022
Yelena Churakova	Russia	Athletics; Women's 400 m hurdles			AIU decision imposed in 2022
Ekaterina Poistogova	Russia	Athletics; Women's 800 metres	dehydroepiandrosterone (DHEA), androstenedione and boldenone	(bronze) later upgraded to (silver)	AIU decision imposed in 2024, following investigation into Moscow testing facility LIMS

==== Did not start ====
Athletes who were selected for the Games, but provisionally suspended before competing.

Name	Country	Sport	Banned substance	Medals revoked	Details of test
Victoria Baranova	Russia	Cycling; Track - sprint	Testosterone		IOC pre-Games testing in Belarus
Kissya Cataldo	Brazil	Rowing; Single sculls	EPO		International Rowing Federation pre-Games testing in Brazil
Luiza Galiulina	Uzbekistan	Gymnastics	Furosemide		IOC pre-Games testing in Uzbekistan.
Amine Laâlou	Morocco	Athletics; 1500 metres	Furosemide		IAAF post-competition testing at Diamond League meeting in Monte Carlo.
Marina Marghieva (Marina Nichișenco)	Moldova	Athletics; Hammer throw	Stanozolol		IOC pre-Games testing.
Diego Palomeque	Colombia	Athletics; 400 metres	Exogenous testosterone		IOC pre-competition testing at 2012 Summer Olympics.
Alex Schwazer	Italy	Athletics; 50 km walk	EPO		IOC pre-Games testing in Italy.
Tameka Williams	Saint Kitts and Nevis	Athletics; 100 metres	"Blast Off Red"		Did not fail test but confessed to have used an illegal "veterinary medicine".

=== 2016 Rio de Janeiro ===
Originally, Russia submitted a list of 389 athletes for competition. On 7 August 2016, the IOC cleared 278 athletes, and 111 were removed because of the state-sponsored doping scandal.

The Taiwanese weightlifter Lin Tzu-chi was withdrawn from the games hours before her event by her team's delegation for an abnormal drugs test.

Kenyan athletics coach, John Anzrah who travelled to Rio independently of his country's delegation, was sent home after being caught posing as an athlete during a doping test, and was followed by Kenya's track and field manager, Michael Rotich, who was filmed by a newspaper offering to give athletes advanced notice of any pending drugs test in return for a one-off payment.

On 13 October 2016, the IWF reported that weightlifter Gabriel Sincraian of Romania, who won bronze in the men's 85-kg event, tested positive for excess testosterone in a test connected to the Rio Olympics. On 8 December 2016, the CAS affirmed the disqualification of Sincraian and stripped him of the bronze medal. The CAS also disqualified silver medalist 52 kg boxer Misha Aloian of Russia after he tested positive for tuaminoheptane.

==== Disqualified ====
Name	Country	Sport	Banned substance	Medals revoked	Details
Izzat Artykov	Kyrgyzstan	Weightlifting; 69 kg	Strychnine	3rd place, bronze medalist(s)	Positive test for strychnine and forfeiture of medal announced by CAS.
Chen Xinyi	China	Swimming; 100 metre butterfly	Hydrochlorothiazide		Tested positive for the diuretic hydrochlorothiazide; applied for B sample to be tested and hearing to be held. Later banned for two years.
Anastassya Kudinova	Kazakhstan	Athletics; 400 metres	Drostanolone		Out-of-competition test in Almaty, Kazakhstan on 13 July 2016
Kléber Ramos	Brazil	Cycling; Road race	CERA		IOC pre-games test 31 July and out-of-competition test (blood and urine) 4 August. Provisionally suspended by UCI on 12 August.
Serghei Tarnovschi	Moldova	Canoeing; C-1 1000 metres C-2 1000 metres	GHRP-2	(bronze) (C-1)	Result from pre-games test. Provisionally suspended on 18 August. In 2017, received four-year ban and disqualification of results from 8 July 2016 onwards.
Chagnaadorj Usukhbayar	Mongolia	Weightlifting; 56 kg	Exogenous testosterone		IOC out-of-competition test on 7 August. Later issued with four-year ban by the International Weightlifting Federation.
Misha Aloian	Russia	Boxing; Men's flyweight	Tuaminoheptane	2nd place, silver medalist(s)	On 8 December 2016, the CAS disqualified weightlifter Gabriel Sîncrăian of Romania and boxer Misha Aloian of Russia for doping.
Gabriel Sîncrăian	Romania	Weightlifting; Men's 85 kg		3rd place, bronze medalist(s)	On 8 December 2016, the CAS disqualified weightlifter Gabriel Sîncrăian of Romania and boxer Misha Aloian of Russia for doping.
Nijat Rahimov	Kazakhstan	Weightlifting; Men's 77 kg		1st place, gold medalist(s)	On 22 March 2022, the CAS disqualified weightlifter Nijat Rahimov of Kazakhstan for doping.
Roilya Ranaivosoa	Mauritius	Weightlifting; Women's 48 kg	Tampering with sample in March 2016		Disqualified by the IWF for the period 24 March 2016 to 23 March 2019.
Alina Fyodorova	Ukraine	Athletics; Women's heptathlon			In 2018, the Athletics Integrity Unit banned Fyodorova for doping with the disqualification of results backdated to July 2016.
Bilyal Makhov	Russia	Wrestling; Men's freestyle 120 kg			According to WADA, LIMS of the Moscow labarotory was found to have falsified his records, engineered a protocol which erased records, and amended positive sample results into negative ones in 2015
Alexandru Șpac	Moldova	Weightlifting; Men's 77 kg	Dehydrochlormethyltestosterone		Backdated disqualification and seven-year ban issued in 2025 after reanalysis of samples taken in 2016.

==== Did not start ====
Athletes who were selected for the Games, but provisionally suspended before competing.

Name	Country	Sport	Banned substance	Details of test
Sergey Fedorovtsev	Russia	Rowing; Men's quadruple sculls	Trimetazidine	Disqualified from competing at the 2016 Olympics after a positive out-of-competition drug test.
Silvia Danekova	Bulgaria	Athletics; Steeplechase	EPO	Provisionally suspended after a failed A-sample test given a few days after arriving in Brazil.
Theodora Giareni	Greece	Swimming; 50 metre freestyle		Sent home from the Olympics on the day of the opening ceremony after failing a pre-games test conducted in July.
Antonis Martasidis	Cyprus	Weightlifting; 85 kg		Sent home from the Olympics after failing a pre-games test conducted on 25 July.
Michael O'Reilly	Ireland	Boxing; Middleweight	not disclosed	O'Reilly admitted to taking a dietary supplement given to him by someone unrelated to his team or association.
Narsingh Pancham Yadav	India	Wrestling; Freestyle 74 kg	Methandienone	Originally cleared to compete by the National Anti-doping Agency of India after failed tests on 25 June and 5 July. Appeal by WADA was upheld by CAS on 18 August, with a 4 years suspension handed down.
Adrian Zieliński	Poland	Weightlifting; 94 kg	Nandrolone	
Tomasz Zieliński	Poland	Weightlifting; 94 kg	Nandrolone	Sent home from the Olympics after failing a test conducted at the Polish Championships in July.
Maxime Livio	France	Eventing		Disqualified from participating due to doping violation

=== 2020 Tokyo ===
==== Disqualified ====
Name	Country	Sport	Banned substance	Medals revoked	Details of test
Tandara Caixeta	Brazil	Women's volleyball	Enobosarm	2nd place, silver medalist(s)	Withdrawn from the semi-final match after a positive out-of-competition drug test. Subsequently banned for four-years.
Sadik Mikhou	Bahrain	Athletics; Men's 1500 metres	Homologous blood transfusion		Disqualified after an out-of-competition test produced an abnormal result.
Tsehay Gemechu	Ethiopia	Athletics; Women's 10,000 meters	Biological passport abnormalities		Backdated disqualification issued in October 2024 for doping. She had already been disqualified for stepping on the inside the track during the race.
Blessing Okagbare	Nigeria	Athletics; Women's 100 meters	Human growth hormone and EPO		Suspended during games after a positive out-of-competition drug test. Subsequently disqualified and banned for eleven years for multiple anti-doping violations.
Chijindu Ujah	Great Britain	Athletics; Men's 4 × 100 metres relay	S-23 and Enobosarm	2nd place, silver medalist(s)	Ujah's positive test led to backdated team disqualification issued in February 2022, with him receiving 22-month ban.
El-Hassan El-Abbassi	Bahrain	Athletics; Men's marathon	Homologous blood transfusion		Backdated disqualification issued in 2023 for doping along with 4-year ban
Igor Andreyevich Polyanski	ROC	Triathlon; Men's Triathlon	EPO		Backdated disqualification issued in October 2021 for doping with 3-year ban
Mohamed Talaat	Egypt	Equestrian Jumping; Show Jumping Team	Cannabis		Retrospective disqualification of Egypt team result issued in December 2021 due to positive test for Talaat at the 2019 African Games
Dayana Sánchez	Argentina	Boxing; Women's lightweight	Furosemide		Backdated disqualified issued by CAS in November 2021 for use of furosemide. All results from 21 Nov 2019 annulled with the addition of a 4-year ban.
Zurabi Datunashvili	Serbia	Wrestling; Greco-Roman 87 kg	Urine substitution and tampering with doping control	3rd place, bronze medalist(s)	Backdated disqualification issued in November 2024 for the use of urine substitution in May 2021 and of tampering. All results from that date onwards disqualified along with a five-year ban.

==== Did not start ====
Athletes who were selected for the Games, but provisionally suspended before competing.

Name	Country	Sport	Banned substance	Details of test
Mark Odhiambo	Kenya	Athletics; Men's 100 meters	Anabolic androgenic steroids	Disqualified from competing at the 2020 Olympics after a positive out-of-competition drug test.
Yuliya Yelistratova	Ukraine	Triathlon; Women's individual	EPO	Disqualified from competing at the 2020 Olympics after a positive in-competition drug test in June 2021.
Benik Abramyan	Georgia	Athletics; Men's shot put	Chlorodehydromethyltestosterone, Metandienone and Tamoxifen	Disqualified from competing at the 2020 Olympics after a positive out-of-competition drug test.
Kariem Hussein	Switzerland	Athletics; Men's 400 metres hurdles	Nikethamide	Withdrawn from Swiss team after testing positive on 16 July.

=== 2024 Paris ===
==== Disqualified ====
Name	Country	Sport	Banned substance	Details of test
Belinda Chemutai	Uganda	Athletics; Women's 5000 metres	Testosterone	Backdated disqualification following an anti-doping rule violation relating to a test at the World Half Marathon championships in October 2023 leading to voiding of results from that date to April 2025 and four-year ban.
Delvine Relin Meringor	Romania	Athletics; Women's marathon	Athlete biological passport violation	Backdated disqualification in January 2025 following an athlete biological passport violation dating from October 2022 and subsequent voiding of results from then including Paris 2024 and three-year ban.
María José Ribera	Bolivia	Swimming; Women's 50m freestyle	Furosemide	Disqualified following an adverse analytical finding. Subsequently issued with 16-month ban for unintentional use of furosemide.
Eleni-Klaoudia Polak	Greece	Athletics; Women's pole vault	Clenbuterol	Disqualified following an adverse analytical finding from test taken in July 2024. Subsequently issued with four-year ban for testing positive for clenbuterol.
Dominique Lasconi Mulamba	Democratic Republic of the Congo	Athletics; Men's 100 metres	Stanozolol	Disqualified during Olympics for positive test. Subsequently issued with four-year ban after prohibited substance confirmed as stanozolol.
Mohammad Samim Faizad	Afghanistan	Judo; Men's 81kg class	Stanozolol	Disqualified following an adverse analytical finding. Subsequently issued with a four-year ban.
Tine Magnus	Belgium	Eventing	Trazodone (found in horse Dia Van Het Lichterveld Z's sample)	Belgian eventing team disqualified. Magnus subsequently issued a five month suspension (backdated to September) and fined CHF 4,000 for unintentional use of trazodone with the horse suspended for two months (backdated to September).
Domien Michiels	Belgium	Dressage	Dorzolamide	Disqualified from individual competition. Score removed from team competition but team not disqualified.
Benard Kibet	Kenya	Athletics; Men's 10,000 metres	Athlete biological passport abnormalities	Backdated disqualification issued in February 2026 following athlete biological passport discrepancies dating from June 2024 and subsequent voiding of results from then including Paris 2024 and four-year ban.
Viktória Madarász	Hungary	Athletics; Women's 20 kilometres walk	Substance not revealed	Backdated disqualifications issued in March 2026 which cover periods in 2017, 2021 and between 23 May and 8 August 2024

==== Did not start ====
Athletes who were selected for the Games, but provisionally suspended before competing.

Name	Country	Sport	Banned substance	Details of test
Sajjad Sehen	Iraq	Judo; Men's 81kg class	Metandienone, Boldenone	Disqualified from competing at the 2024 Olympics after a positive out-of-competition drug test.
Cynthia Ogunsemilore	Nigeria	Boxing; Women's 60kg class	Furosemide	Provisional suspension for testing positive out-of-competition on 25 July 2024. Disqualified before first match.
Norbert Kobielski	Poland	Athletics; Men's High Jump	Pentedrone	Provisonal suspension for testing positive out-of-competition in May 2024 (later confirmed with two-year ban). Entered for the Olympic Games but withdrawn before the opening ceremony.
Kibrom Weldemicael	Eritrea	Athletics; Men's Marathon	EPO and furosemide	Provisional suspension for testing positive in-competition in May 2024 (subsequently confirmed with six-year ban). Withdrawn from Olympics day before event.

== Winter Olympic Games ==
=== 1968 Grenoble ===
No athletes were caught doping at these Games.

=== 1972 Sapporo ===
Name	Country	Sport	Banned substance	Medals
Alois Schloder	West Germany	Ice hockey	Ephedrine	

=== 1976 Innsbruck ===
Name	Country	Sport	Anti-doping rule violation	Medals	Ref.
Galina Kulakova	Soviet Union	Cross-country skiing	Ephedrine	(bronze) (5 km)	
Frantisek Pospisil	Czechoslovakia	Ice hockey	Codeine, Morphine		
Dr. Otto Trefny	Czechoslovakia	Ice hockey (Medical staff)	Administration of prohibited substances to Frantisek Pospisil. Banned from the Olympic Games for life.		

=== 1980 Lake Placid ===
No athletes tested positive at these Games.

=== 1984 Sarajevo ===
The Finnish cross-country skier Aki Karvonen admitted in 1994 that he had received blood transfusions for the Sarajevo Games, which weren't formally banned by IOC until 1986. Karvonen won a silver and two bronze medals at the games.

Name	Country	Sport	Banned substance	Medals
Pürevjavyn Batsükh	Mongolia	Cross-country skiing	Methandienone	

=== 1988 Calgary ===
Name	Country	Sport	Banned substance	Medals
Jarosław Morawiecki	Poland	Ice hockey	Testosterone	

=== 1992 Albertville ===
No athletes were caught using performance-enhancing drugs at these Games. The Russian biathlete Sergei Tarasov admitted in 2015 that the Russian biathlon team had carried out illegal blood transfusions at the Games. Something went wrong with his transfusion, and he was rushed to a hospital where they saved his life.

=== 1994 Lillehammer ===
No athletes were caught using performance-enhancing drugs at these Games.

=== 1998 Nagano ===
No athletes were caught using performance-enhancing drugs at these Games. The Canadian snowboarder Ross Rebagliati, winner of the men's giant slalom, was initially disqualified and stripped of his gold medal by the International Olympic Committee's executive board after testing positive for marijuana. Marijuana was not then on the list of prohibited substances by the IOC, and their decision was reversed by the Court of Arbitration for Sport and Rebagliati's medal reinstated.

=== 2002 Salt Lake City ===
Name	Country	Sport	Banned substance	Medals
Natalya Baranova-Masalkina	Russia	Cross-country skiing	WADA pre-Games test: EPO	
Alain Baxter	Great Britain	Alpine skiing	Methamphetamine	(bronze) (slalom)
Olga Danilova	Russia	Cross-country skiing	Darbepoetin	(gold) (10 km pursuit), (silver) (10 km)
Larisa Lazutina	Russia	Cross-country skiing	Darbepoetin	(gold) (30 km), (silver) (10 km pursuit), (silver) (15 km freestyle)
Marc Mayer	Austria	Cross-country skiing	Possession of blood-transfusion equipment	
Walter Mayer	Austria	Cross-country skiing/Biathlon	Austrian cross-country/biathlon team coach, performed blood transfusions on Marc Mayer and Achim Walcher.	
Johann Mühlegg	Spain	Cross-country skiing	Darbepoetin	(gold) (50 km), (gold) (30 km freestyle), (gold) (20 km pursuit)
Volker Müller	Austria	Cross-country skiing/Biathlon	German chiropractor working for the Austrian cross-country/biathlon team, involved in the blood transfusions on Marc Mayer and Achim Walcher.	
Vasily Pankov	Belarus	Ice hockey	Nandrolone	
Achim Walcher	Austria	Cross-country skiing	Possession of blood-transfusion equipment	

=== 2006 Turin ===
On 25 April 2007, six Austrian athletes were banned for life from the Olympics for their involvement in a doping scandal at the 2006 Turin Olympics, the first time the IOC punished athletes without a positive or missed doping test. The Austrians were found guilty of possessing doping substances and taking part in a conspiracy, based on materials seized by Italian police during a raid on the athletes' living quarters. The Austrians also had their competition results from Turin annulled. A seventh athlete, cross-country skier Christian Hoffmann, had his case referred to the International Ski Federation for further investigation, but IOC charges were dismissed.

The IOC has retested nearly 500 doping samples that were collected at the 2006 Turin Games. In 2014, the Estonian Olympic Committee was notified by the IOC that a retested sample from cross-country skier Kristina Šmigun had tested positive. On 24 October 2016, the World Anti-Doping Agency Athletes' Commission stated that Šmigun, who won two gold medals at the Turin Games, faces a Court of Arbitration for Sport hearing before the end of October. If Šmigun were to be stripped of her gold medals, Kateřina Neumannová of Czech Republic could be elevated to gold in the 7.5 + 7.5 km double pursuit event. Marit Bjørgen of Norway could acquire a seventh gold medal in the 10 km classical event. The case against Šmigun was dropped on 13 December 2017 without any charges being raised.

==== Did not start ====
On 13 February 2006, the Brazilian Olympic Committee announced that Armando dos Santos' preventive antidoping test, which had been done in Brazil on 4 January 2006, was positive for the forbidden substance nandrolone. Santos was ejected from the team, being replaced by former sprinter Claudinei Quirino, the team's substitute athlete.

Name	Country	Sport	Banned substance	Medals
Armando dos Santos	Brazil	Bobsleigh	nandrolone	

==== Disqualified during the Games ====
Name	Country	Sport	Banned substance	Medals
Olga Pyleva	Russia	Biathlon	Carphedon	(silver) (15 km)

==== Disqualified after the Games ====
Name	Country	Sport	Banned substance	Medals
Roland Diethart	Austria	Cross-country skiing	Possession of a prohibited substance or method	
Johannes Eder	Austria	Cross-country skiing	Possession and use or attempted use of a prohibited substance or method	
Wolfgang Perner	Austria	Biathlon	Possession of a prohibited substance or method	
Jürgen Pinter	Austria	Cross-country skiing	Possession of a prohibited substance or method	
Wolfgang Rottmann	Austria	Biathlon	Possession of a prohibited substance or method	
Martin Tauber	Austria	Cross-country skiing	Possession of a prohibited substance or method	

=== 2010 Vancouver ===
On 23 December 2016, the IOC stated that it would re-analyse all samples from Russian athletes at the Olympic Winter Games of Vancouver 2010. In October 2017, the IOC stated that one sole athlete was caught from retests of doping samples from the Vancouver 2010 Winter Olympic Games. Biathlete Teja Gregorin was confirmed as this athlete by the International Biathlon Union. A total of 1195 samples from Vancouver 2010 (70% of the 1700 available) were reanalyzed. This included all medalists and all of the 170 Russian athletes. The IOC requested all Russian samples from the 2010 Games be retested after the publication of the McLaren Report. Russia's disappointing performance at Vancouver (11th in gold medal table with a total of 3 golds) is cited as the reason behind the expansion of a doping scheme alleged to have been in operation at major events such as the 2014 Games at Sochi.

==== Did not start ====
Name	Country	Sport	Banned substance	Medals	Details of test
Albina Akhatova	Russia	Biathlon	Erythropoietin		
Ekaterina Iourieva	Russia	Biathlon	Erythropoietin		
Dmitri Yaroshenko	Russia	Biathlon	Erythropoietin		
Natalya Matveyeva	Russia	Cross-country skiing	Erythropoietin		

==== Disqualified after the Games ====
Name	Country	Sport	Banned substance	Medals	Details of test
Kornelia Marek	Poland	Cross-country skiing	Erythropoietin		
Teja Gregorin	Slovenia	Biathlon; Women's Individual; Women's Sprint; Women's Pursuit; Women's Mass Start; Women's Relay	GHRP-2 & Metabolite		IOC re-analysis of sample in 2017
Evgeny Ustyugov	Russia	Biathlon; Men's Mass Start; Men's Relay	Biological passport abnormalities	1st place, gold medalist(s) 3rd place, bronze medalist(s)	IBU sanction imposed in 2020. Appeals were exhausted, and medals were reallocated by the IOC in 2025.

=== 2014 Sochi ===
According to the director of the country's antidoping laboratory at the time, Grigory Rodchenkov, dozens of Russian athletes at the 2014 Winter Olympics in Sochi, including at least 15 medal winners, were part of a state-run doping program, meticulously planned for years to ensure dominance at the Games.

In December 2016, following the release of the McLaren report on Russian doping at the Sochi Olympics, the International Olympic Committee announced the initiation of an investigation of 28 Russian athletes (the number later rose to 46) at the Sochi Olympic Games. La Gazzetta dello Sport reported the names of 17 athletes, of whom 15 are among the 28 under investigation.

Three female figure skaters were named as being under investigation. They are Adelina Sotnikova, the singles gold medalist, as well as pairs skaters Tatiana Volosozhar and Ksenia Stolbova. Volosozhar and Stolbova won gold and silver medals, respectively, in pairs skating. Both also won gold medals in the team event, which also puts the other eight team medalists at risk of losing their golds. In November 2017 the proceeding against Sotnikova was dropped.

Six cross-country skiers were suspended from competition on the basis of the McLaren Report: Evgeniy Belov, Alexander Legkov, Alexey Petukhov, Maxim Vylegzhanin, Yulia Ivanova and Evgenia Shapovalova. Legkov won a gold and silver medals, and Vylegzhanin won three silver medals. The IOC disqualified all six from Sochi, imposed lifetime bans and, in the process, stripped Legkov and Vylegzhanin of the medals they had won in four events (three individual medals and one team medal). Nikita Kryukov, Alexander Bessmertnykh and Natalya Matveyeva were also disqualified on 22 December 2017.

The International Biathlon Union suspended two Russian biathletes who were in the Sochi games: Olga Vilukhina and Yana Romanova. Vilukhina won silver in sprint, and both women were on a relay team that won the silver medal. They were disqualified and stripped of their medals on 27 November 2017.

The International Bobsleigh and Skeleton Federation suspended four Russian skeleton sliders. They were Alexander Tretyakov, Elena Nikitina, Maria Orlova and Olga Potylitsina. Tretyakov won a gold medal, and Nikitina won a bronze. On 22 November 2017, the IOC stripped these medals and imposed lifetime Olympic bans on all four. Skeleton racer Sergei Chudinov was sanctioned on 28 November 2017.

Seven Russian female ice hockey players were to have hearings before the Oswald Commission on 22 November 2017. Two of the seven were accused of submitting samples showing readings that were physically impossible to be held by a woman. The Russian women's ice hockey team finished sixth at Sochi 2014. On 12 December 2017, six of them were disqualified. Tatiana Burina and Anna Shukina were also disqualified ten days later.

On 24 November 2017, the IOC imposed life bans on bobsledder Alexandr Zubkov and speed skater Olga Fatkulina who won a combined 3 medals (2 gold, 1 silver). All their results were disqualified, meaning that Russia lost its first place in the medal standings. Bobsledders Aleksei Negodaylo and Dmitry Trunenkov were disqualified 3 days later. 3 other Russian athletes who didn't win medals were banned on 29 November 2017. Biathlete Olga Zaitseva and 2 other Russian athletes were banned on 1 December 2017. Bobsledder Alexey Voyevoda who had been already stripped of his gold medals due to the anti-doping violations committed by his teammates was sanctioned on 18 December 2017. Speed skaters Ivan Skobrev and Artyom Kuznetsov, lugers Albert Demchenko and Tatiana Ivanova, and bobsledders Liudmila Udobkina and Maxim Belugin were disqualified on 22 December 2017, bringing the total to 43. Demchenko and Ivanova were also stripped of their silver medals.

On 15 February 2020, the International Biathlon Union announced that because of a doping violation, Evgeny Ustyugov and Russian men's 4 x 7.5 km relay team had been disqualified from the 2014 Olympics. In September 2025 the IOC Executive Board approved medal reallocations.

Name	Country	Sport	Banned substance	Medals	Details of test
Nicklas Bäckström	Sweden	Ice hockey	Pseudoephedrine	2nd place, silver medalist(s)	Awarded despite the doping violation.
Johannes Dürr	Austria	Cross-country skiing	Erythropoietin		
Ralfs Freibergs	Latvia	Ice hockey	Dehydrochloromethyltestosterone		
William Frullani	Italy	Bobsleigh	Methylhexanamine		
Marina Lisogor	Ukraine	Cross-country skiing	Trimetazidine		
Alexandr Loginov	Russia	Biathlon	EPO		Positive after IBU re-tested sample from 26 November 2013. All results from that date onwards annulled.
Irina Starykh	Russia	Biathlon	EPO		Tested positive for EPO in an out-of-competition test conducted 23 December 2013. Withdrawn prior to competition. Starykh has been banned for 2 years.
Ekaterina Iourieva	Russia	Biathlon	EPO		In January 2014, she was reported to fail the doping test again. Withdrawn prior to competition. On 14 July 2014 Iourieva was disqualified for eight years, and all her results after 23 December 2013, were made void.
Vitalijs Pavlovs	Latvia	Ice hockey	Methylhexanamine		
Evi Sachenbacher-Stehle	Germany	Biathlon	Methylhexanamine		
Serguei Sednev	Ukraine	Biathlon	EPO		Positive after IBU re-tested sample from 22 January 2013. All results from that date onwards annulled.
Daniel Zalewski	Poland	Bobsleigh	Stimulant		
Alexander Legkov	Russia	Cross-Country Skiing; 50km Freestyle; 4 x 10km Cross Country; 30km Skiathlon	Disappearing sample	(gold) (50km Freestyle); (silver) (4 x 10km Relay)	IOC sanction imposed in 2017
Evgeniy Belov	Russia	Cross-Country Skiing; 30km Skiathlon; 15km Classical	Disappearing Sample		IOC sanction imposed in 2017
Maxim Vylegzhanin	Russia	Cross-Country Skiing; 50km Freestyle; 30km Skiathlon; 4 × 10km Relay; Team Sprint	Disappearing Sample	(silver) (50km Freestyle); (silver) (Team Sprint); (silver) (4 x 10km Relay)	IOC sanction imposed in 2017
Evgenia Shapovalova	Russia	Cross-Country Skiing; Sprint	Disappearing Sample		IOC sanction imposed in 2017
Alexei Petukhov	Russia	Cross-Country Skiing; Sprint	Disappearing Sample		IOC sanction imposed in 2017
Yulia Ivanova	Russia	Cross-Country Skiing; 10km Classical; Team Sprint; 4 x 5km Relay; 30km Freestyle	Disappearing Sample		IOC sanction imposed in 2017
Aleksandr Tretyakov	Russia	Skeleton; Men's	Disappearing Sample	1st place, gold medalist(s)	IOC sanction imposed in 2017
Elena Nikitina	Russia	Skeleton; Women's	Disappearing Sample	3rd place, bronze medalist(s)	IOC sanction imposed in 2017
Olga Potylitsina	Russia	Skeleton; Women's	Disappearing Sample		IOC sanction imposed in 2017
Maria Orlova	Russia	Skeleton; Women's	Disappearing Sample		IOC sanction imposed in 2017
Olga Stulneva	Russia	Bobsleigh; Two-woman	Disappearing Sample		IOC sanction imposed in 2017
Alexandr Zubkov	Russia	Bobsleigh; Two-man; Four-man	Disappearing Sample	1st place, gold medalist(s)	IOC sanction imposed in 2017
Olga Fatkulina	Russia	Speed skating Women's 500 metres	Disappearing Sample	2nd place, silver medalist(s)	IOC sanction imposed in 2017
Aleksandr Rumyantsev	Russia	Speed skating Men's 5000 metres Men's team pursuit	Disappearing Sample		IOC sanction imposed in 2017
Aleksei Negodaylo	Russia	Bobsleigh; Four-Man	Disappearing Sample	1st place, gold medalist(s)	IOC sanction imposed in 2017
Dmitry Trunenkov	Russia	Bobsleigh; Four-Man	Disappearing Sample	1st place, gold medalist(s)	IOC sanction imposed in 2017
Olga Vilukhina	Russia	Biathlon; Women's sprint Women's pursuit Women's mass start Mixed relay Women's relay	Disappearing Sample	2nd place, silver medalist(s)	IOC sanction imposed in 2017
Yana Romanova	Russia	Biathlon; Women's sprint Women's pursuit Women's individual Women's relay	Disappearing Sample	2nd place, silver medalist(s)	IOC sanction imposed in 2017
Sergei Chudinov	Russia	Skeleton; Men's	Disappearing Sample		IOC sanction imposed in 2017
Alexander Kasjanov	Russia	Bobsleigh; Four-man; Two-man	Disappearing Sample		IOC sanction imposed in 2017
Aleksei Pushkarev	Russia	Bobsleigh; Four-man	Disappearing Sample		IOC sanction imposed in 2017
Ilvir Huzin	Russia	Bobsleigh; Four-man	Disappearing Sample		IOC sanction imposed in 2017
Yuliya Chekalyova	Russia	Cross-Country Skiing; Women's 15 kilometre skiathlon Women's 10 kilometre classical Women's 4 × 5 kilometre relay Women's 30 kilometre freestyle	Disappearing Sample		IOC sanction imposed in 2017
Anastasia Dotsenko	Russia	Cross-Country Skiing; Women's sprint Women's team sprint	Disappearing Sample		IOC sanction imposed in 2017
Olga Zaitseva	Russia	Biathlon; Women's sprint Women's pursuit Women's individual Women's mass start Women's relay Mixed relay	Disappearing Sample	2nd place, silver medalist(s)	IOC sanction imposed in 2017
Inna Dyubanok	Russia	Ice hockey Women's tournament	Disappearing Sample		IOC sanction imposed in 2017
Yekaterina Lebedeva	Russia	Ice hockey Women's tournament	Disappearing Sample		IOC sanction imposed in 2017
Yekaterina Pashkevich	Russia	Ice hockey Women's tournament	Disappearing Sample		IOC sanction imposed in 2017
Anna Shibanova	Russia	Ice hockey Women's tournament	Disappearing Sample		IOC sanction imposed in 2017
Yekaterina Smolentseva	Russia	Ice hockey Women's tournament	Disappearing Sample		IOC sanction imposed in 2017
Galina Skiba	Russia	Ice hockey Women's tournament	Disappearing Sample		IOC sanction imposed in 2017
Alexey Voyevoda	Russia	Bobsleigh; Bobsleigh, Two-Man; Bobsleigh, Four-Man	Disappearing Sample	1st place, gold medalist(s)	IOC sanction imposed in 2017
Albert Demchenko	Russia	Luge; Luge, Men's singles Luge, Team relay	Disappearing Sample	2nd place, silver medalist(s)	IOC sanction imposed in 2017
Tatiana Ivanova	Russia	Luge; Luge, Women's singles Luge, Team relay	Disappearing Sample	2nd place, silver medalist(s)	IOC sanction imposed in 2017
Ivan Skobrev	Russia	Speed skating	Disappearing Sample		IOC sanction imposed in 2017
Artyom Kuznetsov	Russia	Speed skating	Disappearing Sample		IOC sanction imposed in 2017
Liudmila Udobkina	Russia	Bobsleigh	Disappearing Sample		IOC sanction imposed in 2017
Maxim Belugin	Russia	Bobsleigh	Disappearing Sample		IOC sanction imposed in 2017
Tatiana Burina	Russia	Ice hockey Women's tournament	Disappearing Sample		IOC sanction imposed in 2017
Anna Shukina	Russia	Ice hockey Women's tournament	Disappearing Sample		IOC sanction imposed in 2017
Nikita Kryukov	Russia	Cross-country skiing	Disappearing Sample		IOC sanction imposed in 2017
Alexander Bessmertnykh	Russia	Cross-country skiing	Disappearing Sample		IOC sanction imposed in 2017
Natalya Matveyeva	Russia	Cross-country skiing	Disappearing Sample		IOC sanction imposed in 2017
Evgeny Ustyugov	Russia	Biathlon	Oxandrolone	1st place, gold medalist(s)	IBU sanction imposed in 2020. In 2025, appeals were exhausted, and the IOC reallocated the medals.

=== 2018 Pyeongchang ===
After the Russian Olympic Committee was barred from competing at the 2018 Winter Olympics, Russian athletes deemed to be clean were allowed to compete as Olympic Athletes from Russia.

==== Did not start ====
Name	Country	Sport	Banned substance	Medals	Details of test
Kei Saito	Japan	men's 5000 meter short track speed skating relay	acetazolamide		Subsequently issued with a reprimand with no sanction issued.

==== Disqualified during the games ====
Name	Country	Sport	Banned substance	Medals	Details of test
Žiga Jeglič	Slovenia	men's ice hockey	fenoterol		Subsequently issued with eight-month ban for unintentional use.
Alexander Krushelnitskiy	Olympic Athletes from Russia	mixed doubles curling	meldonium	3rd place, bronze medalist(s)	
Nadezhda Sergeeva	Olympic Athletes from Russia	two-woman bobsleigh	trimetazidine		

=== 2022 Beijing ===
By the end of the Beijing Olympics, a total of five athletes were reported for doping violations: Spanish figure skater Laura Barquero, Russian figure skater Kamila Valieva, Iranian alpine skier Hossein Saveh Shemshaki, and two Ukrainians – cross-country skier Valentyna Kaminska and bobsledder Lidiia Hunko.

==== Controversy surrounding the ROC ====
The medal ceremony for the team event in figure skating, where the Russian Olympic Committee (ROC) won gold, originally scheduled for 8 February, was delayed over what International Olympic Committee (IOC) spokesperson Mark Adams described as a situation that required "legal consultation" with the International Skating Union. Several media outlets reported on 9 February that the issue was over a positive test for trimetazidine by the ROC's Kamila Valieva, which was officially confirmed on 11 February. Valieva's sample in question was taken by the Russian Anti-Doping Agency (RUSADA) at the 2022 Russian Figure Skating Championships on 25 December, but the sample was not analyzed at the World Anti-Doping Agency (WADA) laboratory where it was sent for testing until 8 February, one day after the team event concluded.

Valieva was assessed a provisional suspension after her positive result, but upon appeal, she was cleared by RUSADA's independent Disciplinary Anti-Doping Committee (DAC) on 9 February, just a day after receiving the provisional suspension. Following formal appeals lodged by the IOC, the International Skating Union (ISU), and WADA to review RUSADA DAC's decision, the Court of Arbitration for Sport (CAS) heard the case on 13 February, and removal of her provisional suspension was upheld on 14 February, ahead of her scheduled appearance in the women's singles event beginning 15 February. Due to Valieva being a minor at the time, as well as being classified as a "protected person" under WADA guidelines, RUSADA and the IOC announced on 12 February that they would broaden the scope of their respective investigations to include members of her entourage (e.g. coaches, team doctors, etc.).

On 14 February, the CAS declined to reinstate Valieva's provisional suspension issued the previous Monday and ruled that she would be allowed provisionally to compete in the women's singles event. The CAS decided that preventing her from competing "would cause her irreparable harm in the circumstances", while noting that any medals won by Valieva at the Beijing Olympics would be withheld pending the results of the continuing investigation into her doping violation. The temporary provisional decision from the court was made on three grounds: 1/ Due to her age, she is a "Protected Person" as per WADA Code, subject to different rules than adult athletes; 2/ Athlete "did not test positive during the Olympic Games in Beijing"; 3/ "There were serious issues of untimely notification of the results, ... which impinged upon the Athlete’s ability to establish certain legal requirements for her benefit". The IOC announced that the team event medal ceremony, as well as the women's singles flower ceremony and medal ceremony if Valieva were to medal, would not take place until the investigation is over, and there is a concrete decision whether to strip Valieva and the ROC of their medals. To allow for the possibility that Valieva's results may be disqualified, the IOC asked the ISU to expand the qualifying field for the women's singles free skating by one to 25.

On 29 January 2024, the Court of Arbitration for Sport (CAS) ruled in Valieva's doping case involving the Russian Anti-Doping Agency (RUSADA). The International Skating Union (ISU) and World Anti-Doping Agency (WADA) imposed a four year ban on Valieva backdated to 25 December 2021, and disqualified her of all competitive results from that date, including the first place finishes at the 2022 European Figure Skating Championships and the 2022 Olympic team event.

==== Disqualified after the Games ====
Name	Country	Sport	Banned substance	Medals	Details of test
Kamila Valieva	ROC	Team figure skating	Trimetazidine	1st place, gold medalist(s)	Tested positive at Russian Championships in December 2021. Disqualified by CAS in January 2024
Laura Barquero	Spain	Pairs figure skating	Clostebol		Unintentional use and one-year ban.
Lidiia Hunko	Ukraine	Bobsleigh	Turinabol		
Valiantsina Kaminskaya	Ukraine	Cross-country skiing	Mesterolone		

==== Did not start ====
Athletes who were selected for the Games, but provisionally suspended before competing.

Name	Country	Sport	Banned substance	Details of test
Hossein Saveh-Shemshaki	Iran	Alpine skiing	Chlorodehydromethyltestosterone	Disqualified from competing at the 2022 Olympics after a positive out-of-competition drug test.

== See also ==
- Doping at the Asian Games
- List of doping cases in athletics
- List of doping cases in sport
- List of sporting scandals
- List of stripped Olympic medals
- World Anti-Doping Agency
- Technology doping
