= 2010 World Weightlifting Championships – Men's 94 kg =

The men's competition in the middle-heavyweight (– 94 kg) division was held on 24 and 25 September 2010.

== Schedule ==
Date	Time	Event
24 September 2010	09:30	Group D
24 September 2010	12:00	Group C
25 September 2010	12:00	Group B
25 September 2010	18:00	Group A

== Medalists ==
Event	Gold		Silver		Bronze	
Snatch	Aleksandr Ivanov (RUS)	185 kg	Artem Ivanov (UKR)	185 kg	Aurimas Didžbalis (LTU)	178 kg
Clean & Jerk	Valeriu Calancea (ROU)	220 kg	Aleksandr Ivanov (RUS)	218 kg	Andrey Demanov (RUS)	218 kg
Total	Aleksandr Ivanov (RUS)	403 kg	Artem Ivanov (UKR)	402 kg	Valeriu Calancea (ROU)	397 kg

== Records ==
Prior to this competition, the existing world records were as follows.

World record	Snatch	Akakios Kakiasvilis (GRE)	188 kg	Athens, Greece	27 November 1999
World record	Clean & Jerk	Szymon Kołecki (POL)	232 kg	Sofia, Bulgaria	29 April 2000
World record	Total	Akakios Kakiasvilis (GRE)	412 kg	Athens, Greece	27 November 1999

== Results ==
Rank	Athlete	Group	Body weight	Snatch (kg)				Clean & Jerk (kg)				Total
Rank	Athlete	Group	Body weight	1	2	3	Rank	1	2	3	Rank	Total
1st place, gold medalist(s)	Aleksandr Ivanov (RUS)	A	91.92	175	180	185	1st place, gold medalist(s)	213	218	~~225~~	2nd place, silver medalist(s)	403
2nd place, silver medalist(s)	Artem Ivanov (UKR)	A	93.87	180	185	~~189~~	2nd place, silver medalist(s)	205	212	217	4	402
3rd place, bronze medalist(s)	Valeriu Calancea (ROU)	A	93.23	168	174	177	4	215	220	~~226~~	1st place, gold medalist(s)	397
4	Andrey Demanov (RUS)	A	93.80	~~171~~	171	175	9	212	218	~~223~~	3rd place, bronze medalist(s)	393
5	Arsen Kasabijew (POL)	A	93.21	170	175	~~178~~	8	~~215~~	215	~~222~~	5	390
6	Intigam Zairov (AZE)	B	92.72	~~170~~	170	175	6	206	211	~~216~~	6	386
7	Aurimas Didžbalis (LTU)	B	93.36	166	171	178	3rd place, bronze medalist(s)	208	~~213~~	~~213~~	11	386
8	Anatolie Cîrîcu (MDA)	B	93.04	168	~~170~~	171	11	210	~~215~~	~~216~~	8	381
9	Vadzim Straltsou (BLR)	B	92.77	165	170	175	7	205	~~210~~	~~210~~	13	380
10	Gevorik Poghosyan (ARM)	A	92.89	170	~~175~~	~~175~~	12	210	~~220~~	~~220~~	7	380
11	Javier Vanega (CUB)	B	92.51	170	~~175~~	175	5	202	~~208~~	~~208~~	16	377
12	Tomasz Zieliński (POL)	B	92.71	162	166	~~170~~	16	201	~~206~~	208	10	374
13	Asghar Ebrahimi (IRI)	A	93.23	173	~~180~~	~~181~~	10	201	~~210~~	~~210~~	17	374
14	Jung Hyeon-seop (KOR)	B	93.44	~~162~~	162	~~166~~	19	210	~~217~~	~~217~~	9	372
15	Marius Danciu (ROU)	B	93.62	~~170~~	170	~~175~~	13	190	~~200~~	201	18	371
16	David Kavelasvili (GRE)	B	93.91	160	~~165~~	165	17	195	201	205	15	370
17	Kostyantyn Piliyev (UKR)	B	93.48	157	~~162~~	162	20	199	206	~~210~~	12	368
18	José Juan Navarro (ESP)	C	93.69	155	160	~~165~~	24	195	200	205	14	365
19	Almas Uteshov (KAZ)	B	92.12	160	~~166~~	~~166~~	23	200	~~205~~	~~205~~	20	360
20	Vazha Ghonghadze (GEO)	C	93.58	160	165	168	15	180	186	190	29	358
21	Jürgen Spieß (GER)	B	93.39	~~161~~	~~162~~	162	18	~~195~~	195	~~200~~	23	357
22	Suthiphon Watthanakasikam (THA)	C	93.07	162	165	168	14	188	~~193~~	~~193~~	31	356
23	Donatas Anuškevičius (LTU)	C	90.33	155	~~161~~	~~162~~	28	190	196	200	19	355
24	Christos Saltsidis (GRE)	C	93.87	150	~~155~~	156	26	185	192	197	22	353
25	Aliaksandr Makaranka (BLR)	C	90.26	153	158	161	21	190	~~195~~	~~195~~	27	351
26	Wilmer Torres (COL)	C	91.96	~~155~~	155	160	22	185	191	~~198~~	26	351
27	Giyosiddin Ahmedov (UZB)	C	93.64	~~150~~	~~150~~	153	32	198	~~201~~	—	21	351
28	Yuki Hiraoka (JPN)	D	93.96	150	154	156	27	185	190	195	24	351
29	Hsieh Wei-chun (TPE)	C	93.40	153	158	~~162~~	25	~~192~~	~~192~~	192	25	350
30	Ervis Tabaku (ALB)	C	90.88	~~155~~	~~155~~	155	29	~~190~~	190	~~196~~	28	345
31	Mohamed Amine Doghmene (TUN)	D	93.20	150	155	~~157~~	30	177	182	~~190~~	33	337
32	Miika Antti-Roiko (FIN)	D	93.86	~~144~~	145	—	34	186	190	~~195~~	30	335
33	Temur Chkheidze (GEO)	D	93.47	150	~~155~~	~~155~~	33	180	—	—	34	330
34	Resul Elvan (TUR)	D	93.94	145	~~151~~	~~151~~	35	180	~~190~~	~~191~~	35	325
35	Szabolcs Szanati (HUN)	D	93.98	140	~~143~~	143	36	175	180	~~184~~	36	323
36	Jean Greeff (RSA)	D	93.77	130	~~135~~	135	37	167	172	~~175~~	37	307
37	Saeed Shabib Al-Dosari (QAT)	D	91.92	~~85~~	85	90	39	105	110	115	38	205
—	Endri Karina (ALB)	C	93.98	155	~~160~~	~~160~~	31	~~190~~	~~191~~	~~191~~	—	—
—	Lukáš Cibulka (CZE)	D	93.94	~~135~~	135	~~139~~	38	~~175~~	~~175~~	~~175~~	—	—
—	Genta Kawabata (JPN)	D	93.60	~~150~~	~~150~~	~~150~~	—	181	~~186~~	186	32	—
—	Kim Min-jae (KOR)	A	93.96	~~180~~	~~180~~	~~181~~	—	—	—	—	—	—
—	Mohanad Abdul-Hasan (IRQ)	D	88.98	140	147	~~150~~	—	~~177~~	177	183	—	—
—	Roberto Rosado (PUR)	D	93.07	135	138	~~141~~	—	175	180	~~187~~	—	—
—	Shawgi Al-Qaisoum (KSA)	D	91.59	135	~~141~~	~~141~~	—	162	167	~~172~~	—	—
DQ	Vladimir Sedov (KAZ)	A	93.31	180	~~185~~	~~187~~	—	210	~~217~~	~~217~~	—	—
