= Youth Iranian records in Olympic weightlifting =

The following are the national youth records in Olympic weightlifting in Iran. Records are maintained in each weight class for the snatch lift, clean and jerk lift, and the total for both lifts by the I.R. Iran Weightlifting Federation.

== Current records ==
=== Boys ===
Event	Record	Athlete	Date	Meet	Place	Age	Ref/Note
49 kg
Snatch							
Clean & Jerk							
Total							
55 kg
Snatch	92 kg	Matin Mohammadi	6 October 2021	Youth World Championships	Jeddah, Saudi Arabia	17 years, 173 days	
Clean & Jerk	110 kg	Matin Mohammadi	6 October 2021	Youth World Championships	Jeddah, Saudi Arabia	17 years, 173 days	
Total	202 kg	Matin Mohammadi	6 October 2021	Youth World Championships	Jeddah, Saudi Arabia	17 years, 173 days	
61 kg
Snatch							
Clean & Jerk							
Total							
67 kg
Snatch							
Clean & Jerk	130 kg	Iliya Salehipour	7 October 2021	Youth World Championships	Jeddah, Saudi Arabia	14 years, 308 days	
Total							
73 kg
Snatch	118 kg	Amirhossein Hosseinzadeh	8 October 2021	Youth World Championships	Jeddah, Saudi Arabia	17 years, 122 days	
Clean & Jerk	153 kg	Amirhossein Hosseinzadeh	8 October 2021	Youth World Championships	Jeddah, Saudi Arabia	17 years, 122 days	
Total	271 kg	Amirhossein Hosseinzadeh	8 October 2021	Youth World Championships	Jeddah, Saudi Arabia	17 years, 122 days	
81 kg
Snatch	147 kg	Alireza Abbaspoor	8 October 2021	Youth World Championships	Jeddah, Saudi Arabia	17 years, 21 days	
Clean & Jerk	181 kg	Alireza Abbaspoor	8 October 2021	Youth World Championships	Jeddah, Saudi Arabia	17 years, 21 days	
Total	328 kg	Alireza Abbaspoor	8 October 2021	Youth World Championships	Jeddah, Saudi Arabia	17 years, 21 days	
89 kg
Snatch	141 kg	Amirhossein Soleimani	9 October 2021	Youth World Championships	Jeddah, Saudi Arabia	17 years, 27 days	
Clean & Jerk	166 kg	Amirhossein Soleimani	9 October 2021	Youth World Championships	Jeddah, Saudi Arabia	17 years, 27 days	
Total	307 kg	Amirhossein Soleimani	9 October 2021	Youth World Championships	Jeddah, Saudi Arabia	17 years, 27 days	
96 kg
Snatch							
Clean & Jerk							
Total							
102 kg
Snatch							
Clean & Jerk							
Total							
+102 kg
Snatch	176 kg	Taha Nemati	23 November 2023	Junior World Championships	Guadalajara, Mexico	17 years, 297 days	
Clean & Jerk	225 kg	Alireza Yousefi	8 June 2019	Junior World Championships	Suva, Fiji	15 years, 285 days	
Total	396 kg	Alireza Yousefi	8 June 2019	Junior World Championships	Suva, Fiji	15 years, 285 days	

=== Girls ===
Event	Record	Athlete	Date	Meet	Place	Age	Ref/Note
40 kg
Snatch	49 kg	Fatemeh Hassnpour	5 October 2021	Youth World Championships	Jeddah, Saudi Arabia	16 years, 113 days	
Clean & Jerk							
Total							
45 kg
Snatch							
Clean & Jerk	68 kg	Zahra Hosseini	6 October 2021	Youth World Championships	Jeddah, Saudi Arabia	13 years, 63 days	
Total							
49 kg
Snatch	63 kg	Anita Feizi	30 July 2023	Asian Youth Championships	Greater Noida, India	16 years, 273 days	
Clean & Jerk	83 kg	Anita Feizi	30 July 2023	Asian Youth Championships	Greater Noida, India	16 years, 273 days	
Total	146 kg	Anita Feizi	30 July 2023	Asian Youth Championships	Greater Noida, India	16 years, 273 days	
55 kg
Snatch	68 kg	Ghazal Hosseini	7 October 2021	Youth World Championships	Jeddah, Saudi Arabia	15 years, 115 days	
Clean & Jerk	84 kg	Ghazal Hosseini	7 October 2021	Youth World Championships	Jeddah, Saudi Arabia	15 years, 115 days	
Total	152 kg	Ghazal Hosseini	7 October 2021	Youth World Championships	Jeddah, Saudi Arabia	15 years, 115 days	
59 kg
Snatch	76 kg	Fatemeh Keshavarz	8 October 2021	Youth World Championships	Jeddah, Saudi Arabia	16 years, 345 days	
Clean & Jerk	94 kg	Ghazaleh Hosseini	8 October 2021	Youth World Championships	Jeddah, Saudi Arabia	15 years, 116 days	
Total	168 kg	Ghazaleh Hosseini	8 October 2021	Youth World Championships	Jeddah, Saudi Arabia	15 years, 116 days	
64 kg
Snatch	75 kg	Elnaz Bajalani	24 April 2019	Asian Championships	Ningbo, China	16 years, 0 days	
Clean & Jerk	88 kg	Elnaz Bajalani	24 April 2019	Asian Championships	Ningbo, China	16 years, 0 days	
Total	163 kg	Elnaz Bajalani	24 April 2019	Asian Championships	Ningbo, China	16 years, 0 days	
71 kg
Snatch							
Clean & Jerk							
Total							
76 kg
Snatch	70 kg	Kizhan Maghsoodi	10 October 2021	Youth World Championships	Jeddah, Saudi Arabia	16 years, 124 days	
Clean & Jerk	97 kg	Kizhan Maghsoodi	10 October 2021	Youth World Championships	Jeddah, Saudi Arabia	16 years, 124 days	
Total	167 kg	Kizhan Maghsoodi	10 October 2021	Youth World Championships	Jeddah, Saudi Arabia	16 years, 124 days	
81 kg
Snatch	93 kg	Elnaz Bajalani	23 April 2021	Asian Championships	Tashkent, Uzbekistan	17 years, 364 days	
Clean & Jerk	115 kg	Yekta Jamali	11 October 2021	Youth World Championships	Jeddah, Saudi Arabia	16 years, 299 days	
Total	205 kg	Yekta Jamali	11 October 2021	Youth World Championships	Jeddah, Saudi Arabia	16 years, 299 days	
+81 kg
Snatch	100 kg	Yekta Jamali	16 December 2021	World Championships	Tashkent, Uzbekistan	17 years, 0 days	
Clean & Jerk	122 kg	Yekta Jamali	16 December 2021	World Championships	Tashkent, Uzbekistan	17 years, 0 days	
Total	222 kg	Yekta Jamali	16 December 2021	World Championships	Tashkent, Uzbekistan	17 years, 0 days	

== Historical records ==
=== Boys ===
Event	Record	Athlete	Date	Meet	Place	Age	Ref/Note
50 kg
Snatch	91 kg	Majid Askari	2007	Youth Asian Championships	Jordan		
Clean & Jerk	107 kg	Majid Askari	2007	Youth Asian Championships	Jordan		
Total	198 kg	Majid Askari	2007	Youth Asian Championships	Jordan		
56 kg
Snatch	115 kg	Sajjad Behrouzi	9 November 2005	World Championships	Doha, Qatar	16 years, 50 days	
Clean & Jerk	140 kg	Sajjad Behrouzi	9 November 2005	World Championships	Doha, Qatar	16 years, 50 days	
Total	255 kg	Sajjad Behrouzi	9 November 2005	World Championships	Doha, Qatar	16 years, 50 days	
62 kg
Snatch	125 kg	Sajjad Behrouzi	29 May 2006	Junior World Championships	Hangzhou, China	16 years, 251 days	
Clean & Jerk	145 kg	Sajjad Behrouzi	29 May 2006	Junior World Championships	Hangzhou, China	16 years, 251 days	
Total	270 kg	Sajjad Behrouzi	29 May 2006	Junior World Championships	Hangzhou, China	16 years, 251 days	
69 kg
Snatch	131 kg	Kianoush Rostami	26 April 2008	Asian Championships	Kanazawa, Japan	16 years, 278 days	
Clean & Jerk	164 kg	Hossein Soltani	2016	Youth World Championships	Penang, Malaysia	16 years, 322 days	
Total	295 kg	Hossein Soltani	2016	Youth World Championships	Penang, Malaysia	16 years, 322 days	
77 kg
Snatch	139 kg	Afshin Taheri	2017	Youth World Championships	Thailand, Bangkok	17 years, 45 days	
Clean & Jerk	172 kg	Taghi Aghazadeh	2016	Youth Asian Championships	Japan, Tokyo	17 years, 26 days	
Total	306 kg	Taghi Aghazadeh	2016	Youth Asian Championships	Japan, Tokyo	17 years, 26 days	
85 kg
Snatch	146 kg	Alireza Dehghan	6 April 2013	Youth World Championships	Tashkent, Uzbekistan	16 years, 100 days	
Clean & Jerk	176 kg	Alireza Dehghan	25 May 2013	Youth Asian Championships	Doha, Qatar	16 years, 149 days	
Total	319 kg	Alireza Dehghan	6 April 2013	Youth World Championships	Tashkent, Uzbekistan	16 years, 100 days	
94 kg
Snatch	166 kg	Alireza Dehghan	26 October 2013	World Championships	Wrocław, Poland	16 years, 303 days	YAR
Clean & Jerk	194 kg	Navab Nasirshalal	29 May 2006	Junior World Championships	Hangzhou, China	17 years, 89 days	
Total	350 kg	Navab Nasirshalal	29 May 2006	Junior World Championships	Hangzhou, China	17 years, 89 days	
+94 kg
Snatch	170 kg	Ali Davoudi	19 October 2016	Youth World Championships	Penang, Malaysia	17 years, 211 days	
Clean & Jerk	218 kg	Alireza Yousefi	13 October 2018	Youth Olympic Games	Buenos Aires, Argentina	15 years, 47 days	YAR
Total	386 kg	Alireza Kazeminejad	29 June 2011	Junior World Championships	Penang, Malaysia	17 years, 142 days	
