= Eiji Shimomura =

Japanese volleyball player (born 1959)

Personal information
- Born: 31 October 1959 (age 66); Matsusaka, Mie, Japan
- Height: 1.88 m (6 ft 2 in)

National team
1984	Japan

Eiji Shimomura (下村 英士, Shimomura Eiji; born 31 October 1959) is a Japanese former volleyball player who competed in the 1984 Summer Olympics.
