= 2013 World Weightlifting Championships – Men's 94 kg =

The men's competition in the –94 kg division was held on 26 October 2013 in Centennial Hall, Wrocław, Poland.

== Schedule ==
Date	Time	Event
26 October 2013	12:00	Group B
26 October 2013	16:55	Group A

== Medalists ==
Event	Gold		Silver		Bronze	
Snatch	Aleksandr Ivanov (RUS)	180 kg	Almas Uteshov (KAZ)	175 kg	Ragab Abdelhay (EGY)	173 kg
Clean & Jerk	Aleksandr Ivanov (RUS)	222 kg	Almas Uteshov (KAZ)	222 kg	Vadzim Straltsou (BLR)	215 kg
Total	Aleksandr Ivanov (RUS)	402 kg	Almas Uteshov (KAZ)	397 kg	Ramazan Rasulov (RUS)	385 kg

== Records ==
Prior to this competition, the existing world records were as follows.

World record	Snatch	Akakios Kakiasvilis (GRE)	188 kg	Athens, Greece	27 November 1999
World record	Clean & Jerk	~~Ilya Ilyin (KAZ)~~; Szymon Kołecki (POL)	~~233 kg~~ 232 kg	~~London, United Kingdom~~; Sofia, Bulgaria	~~4 August 2012~~; 29 April 2000
World record	Total	~~Ilya Ilyin (KAZ)~~; Akakios Kakiasvilis (GRE)	~~418 kg~~ 412 kg	~~London, United Kingdom~~; Athens, Greece	~~4 August 2012~~; 27 November 1999

- Ilya Ilyin's world records were rescinded in 2016.

== Results ==
Rank	Athlete	Group	Body weight	Snatch (kg)				Clean & Jerk (kg)				Total
Rank	Athlete	Group	Body weight	1	2	3	Rank	1	2	3	Rank	Total
1st place, gold medalist(s)	Aleksandr Ivanov (RUS)	A	93.26	~~180~~	180	~~184~~	1st place, gold medalist(s)	215	~~220~~	222	1st place, gold medalist(s)	402
2nd place, silver medalist(s)	Almas Uteshov (KAZ)	A	93.55	170	175	~~178~~	2nd place, silver medalist(s)	215	222	~~228~~	2nd place, silver medalist(s)	397
3rd place, bronze medalist(s)	Ramazan Rasulov (RUS)	A	93.72	171	~~176~~	~~176~~	4	205	~~211~~	214	4	385
4	Ragab Abdelhay (EGY)	A	93.50	165	170	173	3rd place, bronze medalist(s)	206	211	~~216~~	5	384
5	Vadzim Straltsou (BLR)	A	92.84	167	—	—	7	~~215~~	215	~~220~~	3rd place, bronze medalist(s)	382
6	Tomasz Zieliński (POL)	A	93.34	~~170~~	170	~~175~~	5	205	210	~~214~~	6	380
7	Li Bing (CHN)	A	93.41	165	~~170~~	~~170~~	10	210	~~216~~	~~216~~	7	375
8	Eduardo Guadamud (ECU)	B	93.68	157	162	~~167~~	11	~~195~~	195	~~200~~	8	357
9	Yaroslav Chernyshov (UKR)	B	92.25	165	~~170~~	~~170~~	9	190	~~196~~	~~196~~	9	355
10	Robert Oswald (GER)	B	92.28	155	~~159~~	160	12	~~190~~	190	~~197~~	10	350
11	Christos Saltsidis (GRE)	B	93.80	155	~~160~~	~~160~~	15	185	190	~~196~~	11	345
12	Marco Gregório (BRA)	B	89.62	150	155	~~157~~	14	~~182~~	~~182~~	182	12	337
13	Jared Fleming (USA)	B	93.54	152	~~157~~	157	13	~~175~~	~~175~~	175	14	332
14	Nezir Sağır (TUR)	B	88.70	145	~~150~~	~~152~~	16	170	175	180	13	325
15	Antonio Belloi (ITA)	B	93.87	~~135~~	135	~~140~~	17	170	175	~~180~~	15	310
—	Arsen Kasabijew (POL)	A	93.72	~~165~~	~~165~~	170	6	~~210~~	—	—	—	—
—	Alireza Dehghan (IRI)	B	93.51	161	166	~~169~~	8	~~198~~	~~198~~	~~198~~	—	—
—	Wilmer Torres (COL)	B	92.72	~~158~~	~~158~~	~~158~~	—	~~197~~	~~197~~	~~197~~	—	—
DQ	Aliaksandr Makaranka (BLR)	A	93.22	170	176	180	—	210	~~215~~	~~215~~	—	—
DQ	Vladimir Sedov (KAZ)	A	93.37	175	180	~~184~~	—	~~211~~	211	216	—	—
