= Liudmila Udobkina =

Russian bobsledder (born 1984)

Personal information
- Nationality: Russian
- Born: 3 October 1984 (age 41) Oryol, Soviet Union
- Height: 1.78 m (5 ft 10 in)
- Weight: 84 kg (185 lb)

Sport
- Country: Russia
- Sport: Bobsleigh

Liudmila Udobkina (born October 3, 1984, in Oryol, Soviet Union) is a Russian bobsledder.

== Career ==
Udobkina competed at the 2014 Winter Olympics for Russia. She teamed with driver Olga Stulneva as the Russia-1 sled in the two-woman event, finishing 9th.

As of April 2014, her best showing at the World Championships is 11th, in 2013.

Udobkina made her World Cup debut in November 2004. As of April 2014, her best World Cup finish is 4th, coming in a team event at Konigssee in 2011-12. Her best finish in an Olympic discipline is 5th, which she achieved three times.

In December 2017, she was one of eleven Russian athletes who were banned for life from the Olympics by the International Olympic Committee, after doping offences at the 2014 Winter Olympics.
