= Aleksandr Ivanov (weightlifter) =

Russian weightlifter (born 1989)

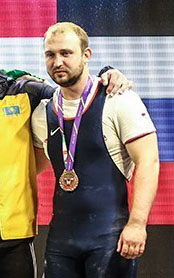
- Ivanov in 2016

Personal information
- Full name: Alexandr Konstantinovich Ivanov
- Nationality: Russian
- Born: July 22, 1989 (age 36) Tbilisi, Georgian SSR, Soviet Union
- Years active: 2006-
- Height: 1.76 m (5 ft 9 in)
- Weight: 94 kg (207 lb)

Sport
- Country: Russia
- Sport: Olympic weightlifting
- Event: –94 kg
- Club: SFO, Krasnoyarsk

Achievements and titles
- Personal bests: Snatch: 186 kg (2011); Clean & Jerk: 226 kg (2012); Total: 411 kg (2012)
Medal record
Olympic Games
Disqualified	London 2012	– 94 kg
World Championships
Gold medal – first place	2010 Antalya	– 94 kg
Disqualified	2013 Wrocław	– 94 kg
- Updated on 21 November 2016

Aleksandr Konstantinovich Ivanov (Russian: Александр Константинович Иванов; born July 22, 1989) is a Russian weightlifter. Prior to the 2012 London Summer Olympics, his best result was 403 kg (185 snatch + 218 clean and jerk achieved in Antalya 2010).

== Doping ==
He originally was awarded the silver medal at the 2012 Summer Olympics in the men's 94 kg category with a total of 409 kg (185 snatch + 224 clean and jerk). On 27 July 2016, the IWF reported that, in the IOC's second wave of doping re-sampling, Ivanov had tested positive for the steroid dehydrochlormethyltestosterone. On 14 September 2016, Ivanov was stripped of his Olympic silver medal.

In 2023 the International Weightlifting Federation annulled his results between 7 March 2012 and 7 February 2022.
