= Alireza Dehghan =

Iranian weightlifter

Personal information
- Nationality: Iran
- Born: 27 December 1996 (age 29)
- Weight: 93.51 kg (206.2 lb)

Sport
- Country: Iran
- Sport: Weightlifting
- Event: 94 kg

Achievements and titles
- Personal bests: Snatch: 171 kg (2016); Clean and jerk: 207 kg (2016); Total: 378 kg (2016)
Medal record
Men's weightlifting
Representing Iran
World Youth Championships
Gold medal – first place	2013 Tashkent	85 kg
Asian Youth Championships
Gold medal – first place	2016 Doha	85 kg

Alireza Dehghan (Persian: علیرضا دهقان قهفرخی, born 27 December 1996) is an Iranian weightlifter who won a gold medal at the 2013 World Youth Championships.

== Major results ==
Year	Venue	Weight	Snatch (kg)				Clean & Jerk (kg)				Total	Rank
Year	Venue	Weight	1	2	3	Rank	1	2	3	Rank	Total	Rank
World Championships
2013	Wrocław, Poland	94 kg	161	166	~~169~~	9	~~198~~	~~198~~	~~198~~	--	--	--
World Junior Championships
2016	(Georgia (country)) Tbilisi, Georgia	105 kg	~~165~~	165	171	3rd place, bronze medalist(s)	207	~~213~~	~~213~~	2nd place, silver medalist(s)	378	2nd place, silver medalist(s)
World Youth Championships
2013	Tashkent, Uzbekistan	85 kg	139	146	~~149~~	1st place, gold medalist(s)	168	173	~~176~~	1st place, gold medalist(s)	319	1st place, gold medalist(s)
Asian Youth Championships
2013	Doha, Qatar	85 kg	~~135~~	135	~~145~~	1st place, gold medalist(s)	165	176	~~180~~	1st place, gold medalist(s)	311	1st place, gold medalist(s)
