= Vladimir Sedov (weightlifter) =

Kazakhstani weightlifter (1988–2023)

Vladimir Sedov Владимир Седов
Personal information
- Full name: Vladimir Vladimirovich Sedov
- Nationality: Kazakhstan
- Born: 2 March 1988 Ushtobe, Alma-Ata Region, Kazakh SSR, Soviet Union
- Died: 26 June 2023 (aged 35) Dostyk, Karatal District, Almaty Region, Kazakhstan
- Height: 1.73 m (5 ft 8 in)
- Weight: 94 kg (207 lb)

Sport
- Sport: Weightlifting
- Event: –94 kg
Medal record
World Championships
Disqualified	2009 Goyang	–94 kg
Disqualified	2014 Almaty	–94 kg
Disqualified	2013 Wrocław	–94 kg
Asian Championships
Disqualified	2009 Taldykorgan	–94 kg
Disqualified	2011 Tongling	–94 kg
Disqualified	2016 Tashkent	–94 kg

Vladimir Vladimirovich Sedov (Kazakh: Владимир Владимирович Седов; 2 March 1988 – 26 June 2023) was a Kazakh weightlifter, who competed in men's 94 kg weight category.

== Career ==
Sedov won a gold medal for the 94 kg class at the 2009 World Weightlifting Championships in Goyang, South Korea, with a total of 402 kg, defeating Azerbaijan's Nizami Pashayev by fifteen kilograms.

Sedov represented Kazakhstan at the 2008 Summer Olympics in Beijing, where he competed for the men's light heavyweight class (85 kg). During the competition, he successfully lifted 180 kg in the single-motion snatch, and hoisted 200 kg in the two-part, shoulder-to-overhead clean and jerk, for a total of 380 kg. Sedov, however, narrowly lost the Olympic medal to Armenia's Tigran Vardan Martirosyan by three kilograms short of his record from the clean and jerk, finishing the entire event in fourth place. On 17 November 2016, the IOC disqualified him from the 2008 Olympic Games and struck his results from the record for failing a drugs test in a re-analysis of his doping sample from 2008.

In his last major international competition, Sedov snatched 175 kg and clean and jerked 211 kg for a 386 kg total and gold medal at the 2016 Asian championships in Tashkent, Uzbekistan.

== Doping ==
Sedov served a two-year ban for doping from 2006. The sanction ended on 18 May 2008. In 2016 he was disqualified from the 2008 Olympic Games for failing a doping re-test and all results were invalidated from 2008 Summer Olympics to 2016 Summer Olympics.

== Results ==
Weightlifting at the 2008 Summer Olympics – Men's 85 kg – he finished fourth, but was disqualified after he tested positive for stanozolol. In 2019, his sample was re-analyzed and due to being positive, all his results from 2008 to 2016 were declared invalid.

Year	Venue	Weight	Rank			
Year	Venue	Weight	Snatch	Cl&Jerk	Total	Team Points
World Championships
2009	South Korea	94 kg	1st place, gold medalist(s)	2nd place, silver medalist(s)	1st place, gold medalist(s)	81
2013	Poland	94 kg	3rd place, bronze medalist(s)	3rd place, bronze medalist(s)	3rd place, bronze medalist(s)	69
2014	Kazakhstan	94 kg	1st place, gold medalist(s)	3rd place, bronze medalist(s)	2nd place, silver medalist(s)	76
Asian Championships
2009	Kazakhstan	94 kg	1st place, gold medalist(s)	1st place, gold medalist(s)	1st place, gold medalist(s)	84
2011	China	94 kg	1st place, gold medalist(s)	3rd place, bronze medalist(s)	2nd place, silver medalist(s)	76
2016	Uzbekistan	94 kg	1st place, gold medalist(s)	1st place, gold medalist(s)	1st place, gold medalist(s)	84

== Death ==
Vladimir Sedov died by suicide on 26 June 2023, at the age of 35.
