= Almas Uteshov =

Kazakhstani weightlifter (born 1988)

Medal record

Men's Weightlifting

Representing Kazakhstan

World Championships
| Silver medal – second place | 2013 Wrocław | –94 kg |
| Disqualified | 2015 Houston | –94 kg |

Asian Championships
| Bronze medal – third place | 2009 Taldykorgan | –94 kg |

Almas Uteshov (born 30 March 1988) is a Kazakhstani weightlifter. He competed for Kazakhstan at the 2012 Summer Olympics.

In November 2016 it was announced retests of the samples taken from the 2012 Olympics indicated that Uteshov had tested positive for prohibited substances. The IOC Disciplinary Commission disqualified Uteshov from the Olympic Games 2012.
