= World record progression women's weightlifting (1998–2018) =

This is a list of world records progression in women's weightlifting from 1998 and 2018. These records are maintained in each weight class for the snatch lift, clean and jerk lift, and the total for both lifts.

The International Weightlifting Federation restructured its weight classes in 2018, nullifying earlier records.

Rescinded for anti-doping violations.

== 48 kg ==
=== Snatch ===
Athlete	Record (kg)	Date	Meet	Place	Ref
World Standard	82.5	1 January 1998	—	—	
(China) Li Zhuo	83.0	16 September 1998	Asian Junior Championships	Chongqing	
(China) Liu Xiuhua	83.5	7 December 1998	Asian Games	Bangkok	
(China) Li Zhuo	84.0	29 August 1999	Asian Championships	Wuhan	
(Bulgaria) Donka Mincheva	85.0	25 April 2000	European Championships	Sofia	
(China) Liu Xiuhua	85.5	9 June 2000	World University Championships	Montreal	
(China) Liu Xiuhua	87.5	9 June 2000	World University Championships	Montreal	
(China) Wang Mingjuan	88.0	30 May 2002	World Junior Championships	Havířov	
(China) Wang Mingjuan	90.0	30 May 2002	World Junior Championships	Havířov	
(China) Wang Mingjuan	90.5	19 November 2002	World Championships	Warsaw	
(China) Wang Mingjuan	92.5	19 November 2002	World Championships	Warsaw	
(China) Li Zhuo	93.0	11 July 2003	World University Championships	Pavia	
(China) Li Zhuo	93.5	10 September 2003	Asian Championships	Qinhuangdao	
(Turkey) Nurcan Taylan	95.0	14 August 2004	Olympic Games	Athens	
(Turkey) Nurcan Taylan	97.5	14 August 2004	Olympic Games	Athens	
(China) Yang Lian	98	1 October 2006	World Championships	Santo Domingo	

=== Clean & Jerk ===
Athlete	Record (kg)	Date	Meet	Place	Ref
World Standard	107.5	1 January 1998	—	—	
(China) Li Xuezhao	108.0	24 April 1998	World University Championships	Ramat Gan	
(China) Li Xuezhao	112.5	24 April 1998	World University Championships	Ramat Gan	
(China) Li Zhuo	113.0	29 August 1999	Asian Championships	Wuhan	
(Bulgaria) Donka Mincheva	113.5	21 November 1999	World Championships	Athens	
(China) Li Zhuo	115.0	28 June 2002	World University Championships	İzmir	
(China) Wang Mingjuan	115.5	19 November 2002	World Championships	Warsaw	
(China) Li Zhuo	116.0	11 July 2003	World University Championships	Pavia	
(China) Li Zhuo	116.5	10 September 2003	Asian Championships	Qinhuangdao	
(China) Yang Lian	117	30 October 2005	East Asian Games	Macau	
(China) Wang Mingjuan	118	9 November 2005	World Championships	Doha	
(China) Yang Lian	119	1 October 2006	World Championships	Santo Domingo	
(China) Chen Xiexia	120	21 April 2007	Asian Championships	Tai'an	
(Turkey) Nurcan Taylan	~~121~~	17 September 2010	World Championships	Antalya	

=== Total ===
Athlete	Record (kg)	Date	Meet	Place	Ref
World Standard	190.0	1 January 1998	—	—	
(China) Li Xuezhao	192.5	24 April 1998	World University Championships	Ramat Gan	
(China) Li Zhuo	195.0	29 August 1999	Asian Championships	Wuhan	
(China) Liu Xiuhua	197.5	9 June 2000	World University Championships	Montreal	
(China) Wang Mingjuan	200.0	30 May 2002	World Junior Championships	Havířov	
(China) Wang Mingjuan	202.5	19 November 2002	World Championships	Warsaw	
(China) Wang Mingjuan	205.0	19 November 2002	World Championships	Warsaw	
(China) Wang Mingjuan	207.5	19 November 2002	World Championships	Warsaw	
(Turkey) Nurcan Taylan	210.0	14 August 2004	Olympic Games	Athens	
(China) Wang Mingjuan	211	9 November 2005	World Championships	Doha	
(China) Wang Mingjuan	213	9 November 2005	World Championships	Doha	
(China) Yang Lian	214	1 October 2006	World Championships	Santo Domingo	
(China) Yang Lian	217	1 October 2006	World Championships	Santo Domingo	

== 53 kg ==
=== Snatch ===
Athlete	Record (kg)	Date	Meet	Place	Ref
World Standard	90.0	1 January 1998	—	—	
(China) Guo Huibing	90.5	19 May 1998	World Junior Championships	Sofia	
(China) Guo Huibing	92.5	19 May 1998	World Junior Championships	Sofia	
(China) Chang Xixiang	95.0	17 September 1998	Asian Junior Championships	Chongqing	
(China) Meng Xianjuan	95.5	1 May 1999	World University Championships	Chiba	
(China) Meng Xianjuan	97.5	1 May 1999	World University Championships	Chiba	
(Chinese Taipei) Li Feng-ying	98.0	18 September 2000	Olympic Games	Sydney	
(China) Yang Xia	100.0	18 September 2000	Olympic Games	Sydney	
(North Korea) Ri Song-hui	102.5	1 October 2002	Asian Games	Busan	
(China) Li Ping	103	14 November 2010	Asian Games	Guangzhou	

=== Clean & Jerk ===
Athlete	Record (kg)	Date	Meet	Place	Ref
World Standard	112.5	1 January 1998	—	—	
(China) Guo Huibing	113.0	19 May 1998	World Junior Championships	Sofia	
(China) Wang Xiufen	115.0	10 November 1998	World Championships	Lahti	
(China) Wang Xiufen	117.5	10 November 1998	World Championships	Lahti	
(China) Yang Xia	118.0	8 December 1998	Asian Games	Bangkok	
(China) Yang Xia	120.0	8 December 1998	Asian Games	Bangkok	
(China) Meng Xianjuan	120.5	1 May 1999	World University Championships	Chiba	
(Chinese Taipei) Li Feng-ying	121.0	30 August 1999	Asian Championships	Wuhan	
(Chinese Taipei) Li Feng-ying	121.5	21 November 1999	World Championships	Athens	
(China) Yang Xia	122.5	18 September 2000	Olympic Games	Sydney	
(China) Yang Xia	125.0	18 September 2000	Olympic Games	Sydney	
(North Korea) Ri Song-hui	125.5	20 November 2002	World Championships	Warsaw	
(China) Li Xuejiu	127.5	20 November 2002	World Championships	Warsaw	
(China) Qiu Hongxia	128	2 October 2006	World Championships	Santo Domingo	
(China) Li Ping	129	22 April 2007	Asian Championships	Tai'an	
(Kazakhstan) Zulfiya Chinshanlo	130	6 November 2011	World Championships	Paris	
(Kazakhstan) Zulfiya Chinshanlo	~~131~~	29 July 2012	Olympic Games	London	
(Kazakhstan) Zulfiya Chinshanlo	132	21 September 2014	Asian Games	Incheon	
(Kazakhstan) Zulfiya Chinshanlo	133	10 November 2014	World Championships	Almaty	
(Kazakhstan) Zulfiya Chinshanlo	134	10 November 2014	World Championships	Almaty	

=== Total ===
Athlete	Record (kg)	Date	Meet	Place	Ref
World Standard	202.5	1 January 1998	—	—	
(China) Guo Huibing	205.0	19 May 1998	World Junior Championships	Sofia	
(China) Chang Xixiang	207.5	17 September 1998	Asian Junior Championships	Chongqing	
(China) Wang Xiufen	210.0	10 November 1998	World Championships	Lahti	
(China) Yang Xia	212.5	8 December 1998	Asian Games	Bangkok	
(China) Meng Xianjuan	215.0	1 May 1999	World University Championships	Chiba	
(China) Meng Xianjuan	217.5	1 May 1999	World University Championships	Chiba	
(China) Yang Xia	222.5	18 September 2000	Olympic Games	Sydney	
(China) Yang Xia	225.0	18 September 2000	Olympic Games	Sydney	
(China) Qiu Hongxia	226	2 October 2006	World Championships	Santo Domingo	
(China) Li Ping	230	14 November 2010	Asian Games	Guangzhou	
(Chinese Taipei) Hsu Shu-ching	233	21 September 2014	Asian Games	Incheon	

== 58 kg ==
=== Snatch ===
Athlete	Record (kg)	Date	Meet	Place	Ref
World Standard	95.0	1 January 1998	—	—	
(China) Chen Yanqing	95.5	24 April 1998	World University Championships	Ramat Gan	
(China) Chen Yanqing	97.5	24 April 1998	World University Championships	Ramat Gan	
(China) Chen Yanqing	98.0	9 December 1998	Asian Games	Bangkok	
(China) Song Zhijuan	98.5	1 May 1999	World University Championships	Chiba	
(China) Chen Yanqing	100.0	4 July 1999	World Junior Championships	Savannah	
(China) Chen Yanqing	102.5	4 July 1999	World Junior Championships	Savannah	
(China) Chen Yanqing	105.0	22 November 1999	World Championships	Athens	
(China) Sun Caiyan	105.5	28 June 2002	World University Championships	İzmir	
(China) Song Zhijuan	106.0	5 October 2002	BorsodChem Grand Prix	Kazincbarcika	
(China) Wang Li	107.5	10 August 2003	Asian Junior Championships	Bali	
(China) Wang Li	110.0	10 August 2003	Asian Junior Championships	Bali	
(China) Chen Yanqing	111	3 December 2006	Asian Games	Doha	
(Azerbaijan) Boyanka Kostova	112	23 November 2015	World Championships	Houston	

=== Clean & Jerk ===
Athlete	Record (kg)	Date	Meet	Place	Ref
World Standard	120.0	1 January 1998	—	—	
(China) Chen Yanqing	120.5	24 April 1998	World University Championships	Ramat Gan	
(China) Chen Yanqing	122.5	24 April 1998	World University Championships	Ramat Gan	
(China) Xiu Xiongying	123.0	20 May 1998	World Junior Championships	Sofia	
(China) Chen Yanqing	123.5	9 December 1998	Asian Games	Bangkok	
(North Korea) Ri Song-hui	125.0	9 December 1998	Asian Games	Bangkok	
(China) Song Zhijuan	125.5	1 May 1999	World University Championships	Chiba	
(China) Chen Yanqing	130.0	4 July 1999	World Junior Championships	Savannah	
(North Korea) Ri Song-hui	131.0	22 November 1999	World Championships	Athens	
(North Korea) Ri Song-hui	131.5	3 May 2000	Asian Championships	Osaka	
(China) Zhou Yan	132.5	25 April 2002	Asian Junior Championships	Khon Kaen	
(China) Sun Caiyan	133.0	28 June 2002	World University Championships	İzmir	
(Thailand) Wandee Kameaim	135	10 November 2005	World Championships	Doha	
(China) Gu Wei	136	10 November 2005	World Championships	Doha	
(China) Gu Wei	139	10 November 2005	World Championships	Doha	
(China) Chen Yanqing	140	3 December 2006	Asian Games	Doha	
(China) Qiu Hongmei	141	23 April 2007	Asian Championships	Tai'an	
(Chinese Taipei) Kuo Hsing-chun	142	21 August 2017	Universiade	Taipei	

=== Total ===
Athlete	Record (kg)	Date	Meet	Place	Ref
World Standard	215.0	1 January 1998	—	—	
(China) Chen Yanqing	217.5	24 April 1998	World University Championships	Ramat Gan	
(China) Chen Yanqing	220.0	24 April 1998	World University Championships	Ramat Gan	
(China) Song Zhijuan	222.5	1 May 1999	World University Championships	Chiba	
(China) Chen Yanqing	227.5	4 July 1999	World Junior Championships	Savannah	
(China) Chen Yanqing	232.5	4 July 1999	World Junior Championships	Savannah	
(China) Chen Yanqing	235.0	22 November 1999	World Championships	Athens	
(China) Sun Caiyan	237.5	28 June 2002	World University Championships	İzmir	
(China) Wang Li	240.0	10 August 2003	Asian Junior Championships	Bali	
(China) Gu Wei	241	10 November 2005	World Championships	Doha	
(China) Chen Yanqing	242	3 December 2006	Asian Games	Doha	
(China) Chen Yanqing	248	3 December 2006	Asian Games	Doha	
(China) Chen Yanqing	251	3 December 2006	Asian Games	Doha	
(Azerbaijan) Boyanka Kostova	252	23 November 2015	World Championships	Houston	

== 63 kg ==
=== Snatch ===
Athlete	Record (kg)	Date	Meet	Place	Ref
World Standard	100.0	1 January 1998	—	—	
(China) Diao Weiwei	100.5	24 April 1998	World University Championships	Ramat Gan	
(China) Diao Weiwei	102.5	24 April 1998	World University Championships	Ramat Gan	
(China) Xiong Meiying	103.0	18 September 1998	Asian Junior Championships	Chongqing	
(China) Lei Li	105.0	10 December 1998	Asian Games	Bangkok	
(China) Lei Li	107.5	10 December 1998	Asian Games	Bangkok	
(China) Lei Li	108.0	2 May 1999	World University Championships	Chiba	
(China) Lei Li	110.0	2 May 1999	World University Championships	Chiba	
(China) Chen Xiaomin	112.5	19 September 2000	Olympic Games	Sydney	
(China) Ouyang Xiaofang	113.0	10 August 2003	Asian Junior Championships	Bali	
(Belarus) Hanna Batsiushka	113.5	18 November 2003	World Championships	Vancouver	
(Belarus) Hanna Batsiushka	115.0	18 August 2004	Olympic Games	Athens	
(Thailand) Pawina Thongsuk	116	12 November 2005	World Championships	Doha	
(Russia) Svetlana Tsarukaeva	117	8 November 2011	World Championships	Paris	

=== Clean & Jerk ===
Athlete	Record (kg)	Date	Meet	Place	Ref
World Standard	127.5	1 January 1998	—	—	
(China) Diao Weiwei	128.0	24 April 1998	World University Championships	Ramat Gan	
(China) Hou Kangfeng	128.5	21 May 1998	World Junior Championships	Sofia	
(China) Lei Li	129.0	2 May 1999	World University Championships	Chiba	
(Chinese Taipei) Chen Jui-lien	130.0	23 November 1999	World Championships	Athens	
(China) Xiong Meiying	132.5	23 November 1999	World Championships	Athens	
(Ukraine) Nataliya Skakun	133.0	3 July 2001	World Junior Championships	Thessaloniki	
(Ukraine) Nataliya Skakun	135.0	25 April 2002	European Championships	Antalya	
(China) Liu Xia	135.5	3 October 2002	Asian Games	Busan	
(Greece) Anastasia Tsakiri	136.0	21 November 2002	World Championships	Warsaw	
(China) Liu Xia	137.5	12 September 2003	Asian Championships	Qinhuangdao	
(Ukraine) Nataliya Skakun	138.0	18 November 2003	World Championships	Vancouver	
(Russia) Svetlana Shimkova	139	12 November 2005	World Championships	Doha	
(Thailand) Pawina Thongsuk	140	12 November 2005	World Championships	Doha	
(Russia) Svetlana Shimkova	141	3 May 2006	European Championships	Władysławowo	
(Thailand) Pawina Thongsuk	142	4 December 2006	Asian Games	Doha	
(Kazakhstan) Maiya Maneza	143	20 September 2010	World Championships	Antalya	
(China) Deng Wei	144	23 September 2014	Asian Games	Incheon	
(Chinese Taipei) Lin Tzu-chi	145	23 September 2014	Asian Games	Incheon	
(China) Deng Wei	146	25 November 2015	World Championships	Houston	
(China) Deng Wei	147	9 August 2016	Olympic Games	Rio de Janeiro	

=== Total ===
Athlete	Record (kg)	Date	Meet	Place	Ref
World Standard	227.5	1 January 1998	—	—	
(China) Diao Weiwei	230.0	24 April 1998	World University Championships	Ramat Gan	
(China) Lei Li	232.5	10 December 1998	Asian Games	Bangkok	
(China) Lei Li	235.0	2 May 1999	World University Championships	Chiba	
(China) Lei Li	237.5	2 May 1999	World University Championships	Chiba	
(Chinese Taipei) Chen Jui-lien	240.0	23 November 1999	World Championships	Athens	
(China) Chen Xiaomin	242.5	19 September 2000	Olympic Games	Sydney	
(China) Liu Xia	245.0	12 September 2003	Asian Championships	Qinhuangdao	
(China) Liu Xia	247.5	12 September 2003	Asian Championships	Qinhuangdao	
(Thailand) Pawina Thongsuk	251	12 November 2005	World Championships	Doha	
(Thailand) Pawina Thongsuk	256	12 November 2005	World Championships	Doha	
(China) Liu Haixia	257	23 September 2007	World Championships	Chiang Mai	
(Chinese Taipei) Lin Tzu-chi	259	23 September 2014	Asian Games	Incheon	
(Chinese Taipei) Lin Tzu-chi	261	23 September 2014	Asian Games	Incheon	
(China) Deng Wei	262	9 August 2016	Olympic Games	Rio de Janeiro	

== 69 kg ==
=== Snatch ===
Athlete	Record (kg)	Date	Meet	Place	Ref
World Standard	105.0	1 January 1998	—	—	
(China) Tang Weifang	105.5	24 April 1998	World University Championships	Ramat Gan	
(China) Tang Weifang	110.0	24 April 1998	World University Championships	Ramat Gan	
(China) Tang Weifang	110.5	13 November 1998	World Championships	Lahti	
(China) Sun Tianni	111.0	11 December 1998	Asian Games	Bangkok	
(China) Liu Dongping	111.5	6 July 2000	World Junior Championships	Prague	
(Hungary) Erzsébet Márkus	112.5	19 September 2000	Olympic Games	Sydney	
(Russia) Valentina Popova	113.5	1 September 2001	Goodwill Games	Brisbane	
(Russia) Valentina Popova	115.0	8 November 2001	World Championships	Antalya	
(China) Liu Chunhong	115.5	6 October 2002	Asian Games	Busan	
(Thailand) Pawina Thongsuk	116.0	12 July 2003	World University Championships	Pavia	
(China) Liu Chunhong	117.5	12 September 2003	Asian Championships	Qinhuangdao	
(China) Liu Chunhong	118.0	19 November 2003	World Championships	Vancouver	
(China) Liu Chunhong	120.0	19 November 2003	World Championships	Vancouver	
(China) Liu Chunhong	122.5	19 August 2004	Olympic Games	Athens	
(Russia) Oxana Slivenko	123	4 October 2006	World Championships	Santo Domingo	
(China) Liu Chunhong	~~125~~	13 August 2008	Olympic Games	Beijing	
(China) Liu Chunhong	~~128~~	13 August 2008	Olympic Games	Beijing	

=== Clean & Jerk ===
Athlete	Record (kg)	Date	Meet	Place	Ref
World Standard	132.5	1 January 1998	—	—	
(China) Tang Weifang	133.0	24 April 1998	World University Championships	Ramat Gan	
(China) Shang Shichun	133.5	22 May 1998	World Junior Championships	Sofia	
(China) Sun Tianni	135.0	11 December 1998	Asian Games	Bangkok	
(Bulgaria) Milena Trendafilova	135.5	16 April 1999	European Championships	A Coruña	
(China) Sun Tianni	136.0	2 May 1999	World University Championships	Chiba	
(China) Lin Weining	137.5	6 July 1999	World Junior Championships	Savannah	
(China) Lin Weining	138.5	29 August 1999	Asian Championships	Wuhan	
(China) Lin Weining	142.5	29 August 1999	Asian Championships	Wuhan	
(China) Sun Tianni	143.0	24 November 1999	World Championships	Athens	
(Russia) Valentina Popova	143.5	1 September 2001	Goodwill Games	Brisbane	
(China) Liu Chunhong	144.0	3 June 2002	World Junior Championships	Havířov	
(China) Liu Chunhong	147.5	3 June 2002	World Junior Championships	Havířov	
(China) Liu Chunhong	148.0	6 October 2002	Asian Games	Busan	
(China) Liu Chunhong	148.5	12 September 2003	Asian Championships	Qinhuangdao	
(China) Liu Chunhong	150.0	19 November 2003	World Championships	Vancouver	
(China) Liu Chunhong	150.5	9 April 2004	Asian Championships	Almaty	
(China) Liu Chunhong	152.5	9 April 2004	Asian Championships	Almaty	
(China) Liu Chunhong	153.0	19 August 2004	Olympic Games	Athens	
(China) Liu Haixia	154	13 November 2005	World Championships	Doha	
(Russia) Zarema Kasaeva	157	13 November 2005	World Championships	Doha	
(China) Liu Chunhong	~~158~~	13 August 2008	Olympic Games	Beijing	

=== Total ===
Athlete	Record (kg)	Date	Meet	Place	Ref
World Standard	237.5	1 January 1998	—	—	
(China) Tang Weifang	240.0	24 April 1998	World University Championships	Ramat Gan	
(China) Tang Weifang	242.5	24 April 1998	World University Championships	Ramat Gan	
(China) Sun Tianni	245.0	11 December 1998	Asian Games	Bangkok	
(China) Lin Weining	247.5	29 August 1999	Asian Championships	Wuhan	
(China) Lin Weining	252.5	29 August 1999	Asian Championships	Wuhan	
(Russia) Valentina Popova	255.0	1 September 2001	Goodwill Games	Brisbane	
(Russia) Valentina Popova	257.5	8 November 2001	World Championships	Antalya	
(China) Liu Chunhong	260.0	6 October 2002	Asian Games	Busan	
(China) Liu Chunhong	262.5	6 October 2002	Asian Games	Busan	
(China) Liu Chunhong	265.0	12 September 2003	Asian Championships	Qinhuangdao	
(China) Liu Chunhong	267.5	19 November 2003	World Championships	Vancouver	
(China) Liu Chunhong	270.0	19 November 2003	World Championships	Vancouver	
(China) Liu Chunhong	275.0	19 August 2004	Olympic Games	Athens	
(Russia) Oxana Slivenko	276	24 September 2007	World Championships	Chiang Mai	
(China) Liu Chunhong	~~277~~	13 August 2008	Olympic Games	Beijing	
(China) Liu Chunhong	~~286~~	13 August 2008	Olympic Games	Beijing	

== 75 kg ==
=== Snatch ===
Athlete	Record (kg)	Date	Meet	Place	Ref
World Standard	110.0	1 January 1998	—	—	
(China) Liu Jie	111.0	20 September 1998	Asian Junior Championships	Chongqing	
(China) Zhao La	111.5	20 September 1998	Asian Junior Championships	Chongqing	
(China) Wei Xiangying	112.5	12 December 1998	Asian Games	Bangkok	
(China) Wei Xiangying	115.0	12 December 1998	Asian Games	Bangkok	
(China) Xu Jiao	115.5	6 July 1999	World Junior Championships	Savannah	
(China) Tang Weifang	116.0	3 September 1999	Asian Championships	Wuhan	
(Kazakhstan) Tatyana Khromova	118.0	7 October 2002	Asian Games	Busan	
(China) Sun Ruiping	118.5	7 October 2002	Asian Games	Busan	
(China) Shang Shichun	~~120.0~~	20 November 2003	World Championships	Vancouver	
(Kazakhstan) Tatyana Khromova	120.0	10 April 2004	Asian Championships	Almaty	
(Russia) Valentina Popova	120.5	20 August 2004	Olympic Games	Athens	
(Thailand) Pawina Thongsuk	122.5	20 August 2004	Olympic Games	Athens	
(Russia) Natalya Zabolotnaya	125.0	20 August 2004	Olympic Games	Athens	
(China) Liu Chunhong	126	13 November 2005	World Championships	Doha	
(Russia) Natalya Zabolotnaya	127	13 November 2005	World Championships	Doha	
(Russia) Natalya Zabolotnaya	130	13 November 2005	World Championships	Doha	
(Russia) Natalya Zabolotnaya	131	25 September 2007	World Championships	Chiang Mai	
(Kazakhstan) Svetlana Podobedova	132	28 November 2009	World Championships	Goyang	
(Russia) Natalya Zabolotnaya	133	23 September 2010	World Championships	Antalya	
(Kazakhstan) Svetlana Podobedova	134	23 September 2010	World Championships	Antalya	
(Russia) Natalya Zabolotnaya	135	17 December 2011	President's Cup	Belgorod	

=== Clean & Jerk ===
Athlete	Record (kg)	Date	Meet	Place	Ref
World Standard	140.0	1 January 1998	—	—	
(China) Tang Weifang	140.5	3 May 1999	World University Championships	Chiba	
(China) Tang Weifang	141.0	3 September 1999	Asian Championships	Wuhan	
(China) Sun Tianni	142.5	6 May 2000	Asian Championships	Osaka	
(Hungary) Gyöngyi Likerecz	143.0	4 June 2002	World Junior Championships	Havířov	
(China) Sun Ruiping	145.0	7 October 2002	Asian Games	Busan	
(China) Sun Ruiping	152.5	7 October 2002	Asian Games	Busan	
(China) Shang Shichun	~~153.0~~	20 November 2003	World Championships	Vancouver	
(Russia) Svetlana Podobedova	155	13 November 2005	World Championships	Doha	
(China) Liu Chunhong	159	13 November 2005	World Championships	Doha	
(Kazakhstan) Svetlana Podobedova	160	28 November 2009	World Championships	Goyang	
(Kazakhstan) Svetlana Podobedova	161	23 September 2010	World Championships	Antalya	
(Russia) Nadezhda Evstyukhina	162	16 April 2011	European Championships	Kazan	
(Russia) Nadezhda Evstyukhina	163	10 November 2011	World Championships	Paris	
(North Korea) Kim Un-ju	164	25 September 2014	Asian Games	Incheon	

=== Total ===
Athlete	Record (kg)	Date	Meet	Place	Ref
World Standard	250.0	1 January 1998	—	—	
(China) Tang Weifang	255.0	3 September 1999	Asian Championships	Wuhan	
(China) Sun Tianni	257.5	6 May 2000	Asian Championships	Osaka	
(China) Sun Ruiping	262.5	7 October 2002	Asian Games	Busan	
(China) Sun Ruiping	270.0	7 October 2002	Asian Games	Busan	
(China) Shang Shichun	~~272.5~~	20 November 2003	World Championships	Vancouver	
(Russia) Natalya Zabolotnaya	272.5	20 August 2004	Olympic Games	Athens	
(China) Liu Chunhong	273	23 May 2005	World Junior Championships	Busan	
(Russia) Natalya Zabolotnaya	278	13 November 2005	World Championships	Doha	
(Russia) Svetlana Podobedova	279	13 November 2005	World Championships	Doha	
(China) Liu Chunhong	281	13 November 2005	World Championships	Doha	
(Russia) Natalya Zabolotnaya	285	13 November 2005	World Championships	Doha	
(Russia) Svetlana Podobedova	286	2 June 2006	World Junior Championships	Hangzhou	
(Kazakhstan) Svetlana Podobedova	287	28 November 2009	World Championships	Goyang	
(Kazakhstan) Svetlana Podobedova	292	28 November 2009	World Championships	Goyang	
(Russia) Natalya Zabolotnaya	293	23 September 2010	World Championships	Antalya	
(Kazakhstan) Svetlana Podobedova	295	23 September 2010	World Championships	Antalya	
(Russia) Natalya Zabolotnaya	296	17 December 2011	President's Cup	Belgorod	

== 90 kg ==
=== Snatch ===
Athlete	Record (kg)	Date	Meet	Place	Ref
(Ukraine) Viktoriya Shaimardanova ^{[a]}	130	21 August 2004	Olympic Games	Athens	

=== Clean & Jerk ===
Athlete	Record (kg)	Date	Meet	Place	Ref
(Armenia) Hripsime Khurshudyan ^{[a]}^{[c]}	~~160~~	25 September 2010	World Championships	Antalya	
(Turkey) Derya Açıkgöz ^{[b]}	155	26 April 2002	European Championships	Antalya	

=== Total ===
Athlete	Record (kg)	Date	Meet	Place	Ref
(Armenia) Hripsime Khurshudyan ^{[a]}^{[b]}	~~290~~	25 September 2010	World Championships	Antalya	
(Ukraine) Viktoriya Shaimardanova ^{[b]}	280	21 August 2004	Olympic Games	Athens	

== +90 kg ==
=== Snatch ===
Athlete	Record (kg)	Date	Meet	Place	Ref
World Standard	117.5	1 January 1998	—	—	
(China) Ding Meiyuan	118.0	8 May 1998	Szekszárd Cup	Szekszárd	
(China) Zhang Nan	118.5	24 May 1998	World Junior Championships	Sofia	
(China) Ding Meiyuan	120.0	13 December 1998	Asian Games	Bangkok	
(Poland) Agata Wróbel	120.5	18 April 1999	European Championships	A Coruña	
(China) Ding Meiyuan	121.0	3 May 1999	World University Championships	Chiba	
(Poland) Agata Wróbel	121.5	8 July 1999	World Junior Championships	Savannah	
(Poland) Agata Wróbel	122.5	8 July 1999	World Junior Championships	Savannah	
(China) Zhang Nan	123.0	5 September 1999	Asian Junior Championships	Wuhan	
(China) Wang Yanmei	123.5	5 September 1999	Asian Championships	Wuhan	
(Poland) Agata Wróbel	125.0	26 September 1999	European Junior Championships	Spała	
(Poland) Agata Wróbel	127.5	27 November 1999	World Championships	Athens	
(Poland) Agata Wróbel	130.0	8 July 2000	World Junior Championships	Prague	
(Poland) Agata Wróbel	132.5	22 September 2000	Olympic Games	Sydney	
(China) Ding Meiyuan	135.0	22 September 2000	Olympic Games	Sydney	
(China) Ding Meiyuan	135.5	21 November 2003	World Championships	Vancouver	
(China) Ding Meiyuan	137.5	21 November 2003	World Championships	Vancouver	
(South Korea) Jang Mi-ran	138	22 May 2006	Friendship Tournament	Wonju	
(China) Mu Shuangshuang	139	6 December 2006	Asian Games	Doha	
(South Korea) Jang Mi-ran	140	16 August 2008	Olympic Games	Beijing	
(Russia) Tatiana Kashirina	141	25 September 2010	World Championships	Antalya	
(Russia) Tatiana Kashirina	145	25 September 2010	World Championships	Antalya	
(Russia) Tatiana Kashirina	146	17 April 2011	European Championships	Kazan	
(Russia) Tatiana Kashirina	147	13 November 2011	World Championships	Paris	
(Russia) Tatiana Kashirina	148	18 December 2011	President's Cup	Belgorod	
(Russia) Tatiana Kashirina	149	5 August 2012	Olympic Games	London	
(Russia) Tatiana Kashirina	151	5 August 2012	Olympic Games	London	
(Russia) Tatiana Kashirina	~~152~~	16 November 2014	World Championships	Almaty	
(Russia) Tatiana Kashirina	~~155~~	16 November 2014	World Championships	Almaty	

=== Clean & Jerk ===
Athlete	Record (kg)	Date	Meet	Place	Ref
World Standard	155.0	1 January 1998	—	—	
(China) Tang Gonghong	155.5	24 April 1998	World University Championships	Ramat Gan	
(China) Ding Meiyuan	156.0	3 May 1999	World University Championships	Chiba	
(China) Ding Meiyuan	157.5	27 November 1999	World Championships	Athens	
(Poland) Agata Wróbel	158.0	28 April 2000	European Championships	Sofia	
(Poland) Agata Wróbel	160.0	28 April 2000	European Championships	Sofia	
(China) Ding Meiyuan	160.5	6 May 2000	Asian Championships	Osaka	
(China) Wang Yanmei	161.0	11 June 2000	World University Championships	Montreal	
(Poland) Agata Wróbel	162.5	22 September 2000	Olympic Games	Sydney	
(China) Ding Meiyuan	165.0	22 September 2000	Olympic Games	Sydney	
(China) Tang Gonghong	165.5	7 October 2002	Asian Games	Busan	
(China) Tang Gonghong	167.5	7 October 2002	Asian Games	Busan	
(China) Tang Gonghong	168.0	14 September 2003	Asian Championships	Qinhuangdao	
(China) Sun Dan	168.5	31 October 2003	Afro-Asian Games	Hyderabad	
(China) Tang Gonghong	170.0	11 April 2004	Asian Championships	Almaty	
(China) Tang Gonghong	175.0	11 April 2004	Asian Championships	Almaty	
(China) Tang Gonghong	182.5	21 August 2004	Olympic Games	Athens	
(South Korea) Jang Mi-ran	183	16 August 2008	Olympic Games	Beijing	
(South Korea) Jang Mi-ran	186	16 August 2008	Olympic Games	Beijing	
(South Korea) Jang Mi-ran	187	28 November 2009	World Championships	Goyang	
(China) Meng Suping	188	9 November 2012	World University Championships	Eilat	
(Russia) Tatiana Kashirina	~~190~~	26 October 2013	World Championships	Wrocław	
(China) Zhou Lulu	192	26 September 2014	Asian Games	Incheon	
(Russia) Tatiana Kashirina	~~193~~	16 November 2014	World Championships	Almaty	

=== Total ===
Athlete	Record (kg)	Date	Meet	Place	Ref
World Standard	260.0	1 January 1998	—	—	
(China) Tang Gonghong	267.5	24 April 1998	World University Championships	Ramat Gan	
(China) Ding Meiyuan	270.0	13 December 1998	Asian Games	Bangkok	
(China) Ding Meiyuan	272.5	3 May 1999	World University Championships	Chiba	
(China) Ding Meiyuan	275.0	3 May 1999	World University Championships	Chiba	
(China) Ding Meiyuan	277.5	27 November 1999	World Championships	Athens	
(Poland) Agata Wróbel	280.0	27 November 1999	World Championships	Athens	
(China) Ding Meiyuan	282.5	27 November 1999	World Championships	Athens	
(China) Ding Meiyuan	285.0	27 November 1999	World Championships	Athens	
(Poland) Agata Wróbel	290.0	8 July 2000	World Junior Championships	Prague	
(China) Ding Meiyuan	292.5	22 September 2000	Olympic Games	Sydney	
(Poland) Agata Wróbel	295.0	22 September 2000	Olympic Games	Sydney	
(China) Ding Meiyuan	297.5	22 September 2000	Olympic Games	Sydney	
(China) Ding Meiyuan	300.0	22 September 2000	Olympic Games	Sydney	
(China) Tang Gonghong	302.5	11 April 2004	Asian Championships	Almaty	
(China) Tang Gonghong	305.0	21 August 2004	Olympic Games	Athens	
(South Korea) Jang Mi-ran	318	22 May 2006	Friendship Tournament	Wonju	
(China) Mu Shuangshuang	319	26 September 2007	World Championships	Chiang Mai	
(South Korea) Jang Mi-ran	323	16 August 2008	Olympic Games	Beijing	
(South Korea) Jang Mi-ran	326	16 August 2008	Olympic Games	Beijing	
(Russia) Tatiana Kashirina	327	17 April 2011	European Championships	Kazan	
(China) Zhou Lulu	328	13 November 2011	World Championships	Paris	
(Russia) Tatiana Kashirina	332	5 August 2012	Olympic Games	London	
(China) Zhou Lulu	333	5 August 2012	Olympic Games	London	
(Russia) Tatiana Kashirina	~~334~~	23 November 2013	President's Cup	Moscow	
(Russia) Tatiana Kashirina	~~340~~	16 November 2014	World Championships	Almaty	
(Russia) Tatiana Kashirina	~~348~~	16 November 2014	World Championships	Almaty	
(China) Zhou Lulu ^{[c]}	334	26 September 2014	Asian Games	Incheon	

== Notes ==
- ^{a} Not a world record at the time of the competition, became a world record when IWF introduced a new weight category on 1 January 2017.
- ^{b} Hripsime Khurshudyan's records from 25 September 2010 was rescinded in 2020 following disqualification for banned drug use; which could make Derya Açıkgöz and Viktoriya Shaimardanova the world record holders. By that time, however, the IWF changed the weight classes and erased all previous records.
- ^{c} Not an official world record, but the best result in that time.

== See also ==
- World record progression women's weightlifting
- World record progression men's weightlifting
- World record progression men's weightlifting (1998–2018)
