= Weightlifting at the 1998 Asian Games =

- Venue: Thunder Dome
- Dates: 7–14 December 1998
- Competitors: 163 from 25 nations

The weightlifting competition took place from December 7 to December 14 at the 1998 Asian Games in Bangkok Land Sports Complex, Bangkok, Thailand.

== Schedule ==
A	Group A

Event↓/Date →	7th Mon	8th Tue	9th Wed	10th Thu	11th Fri	12th Sat	13th Sun	14th Mon
Men's 56 kg	A							
Men's 62 kg		A						
Men's 69 kg			A					
Men's 77 kg				A				
Men's 85 kg					A			
Men's 94 kg						A		
Men's 105 kg							A	
Men's +105 kg								A
Women's 48 kg	A							
Women's 53 kg		A						
Women's 58 kg			A					
Women's 63 kg				A				
Women's 69 kg					A			
Women's 75 kg						A		
Women's +75 kg							A	

== Medalists ==
=== Men ===
Event	Gold	Silver	Bronze
56 kg	Lan Shizhang; China	Wang Shin-yuan; Chinese Taipei	Mehdi Panzvan; Iran
62 kg	Le Maosheng; China	Dmitriy Lomakin; Kazakhstan	Hiroshi Ikehata; Japan
69 kg	Kim Hak-bong; South Korea	Wan Jianhui; China	Kim Myong-jung; North Korea
77 kg	Zhan Xugang; China	Mohammad Hossein Barkhah; Iran	Sergey Filimonov; Kazakhstan
85 kg	Shahin Nassirinia; Iran	Yuan Aijun; China	Bakhtiyor Nurullaev; Uzbekistan
94 kg	Andrey Makarov; Kazakhstan	Kourosh Bagheri; Iran	Chun Yong-sung; South Korea
105 kg	Cui Wenhua; China	Anatoly Khrapaty; Kazakhstan	Choi Jong-kun; South Korea
+105 kg	Kim Tae-hyun; South Korea	Igor Khalilov; Uzbekistan	Hossein Rezazadeh; Iran

=== Women ===
Event	Gold	Silver	Bronze
48 kg	Liu Xiuhua; China	Kay Thi Win; Myanmar	Sri Indriyani; Indonesia
53 kg	Yang Xia; China	Li Feng-ying; Chinese Taipei	Swe Swe Win; Myanmar
58 kg	Chen Yanqing; China	Ri Song-hui; North Korea	Khassaraporn Suta; Thailand
63 kg	Lei Li; China	Karnam Malleswari; India	Chen Jui-lien; Chinese Taipei
69 kg	Sun Tianni; China	Win Win Maw; Myanmar	Wu Mei-yi; Chinese Taipei
75 kg	Wei Xiangying; China	Kim Soon-hee; South Korea	Aye Mon Khin; Myanmar
+75 kg	Ding Meiyuan; China	Aye Aye Aung; Myanmar	Chen Hsiao-lien; Chinese Taipei

== Medal table ==
Rank	Nation	Gold	Silver	Bronze	Total
1	China (CHN)	11	2	0	13
2	South Korea (KOR)	2	1	2	5
3	Iran (IRI)	1	2	2	5
4	Kazakhstan (KAZ)	1	2	1	4
5	Myanmar (MYA)	0	3	2	5
6	Chinese Taipei (TPE)	0	2	3	5
7	North Korea (PRK)	0	1	1	2
7	Uzbekistan (UZB)	0	1	1	2
9	India (IND)	0	1	0	1
10	Indonesia (INA)	0	0	1	1
10	Japan (JPN)	0	0	1	1
10	Thailand (THA)	0	0	1	1
Totals (12 entries)		15	15	15	45

== Participating nations ==
A total of 163 athletes from 25 nations competed in weightlifting at the 1998 Asian Games:

- Bangladesh (2)
- China (15)
- Chinese Taipei (15)
- India (7)
- Indonesia (5)
- Iran (8)
- Japan (15)
- Jordan (2)
- Kazakhstan (10)
- Kuwait (1)
- Kyrgyzstan (4)
- Lebanon (3)
- Malaysia (2)
- Myanmar (7)
- Nepal (4)
- North Korea (10)
- Pakistan (2)
- Philippines (4)
- Qatar (3)
- South Korea (13)
- Syria (5)
- Thailand (15)
- Turkmenistan (2)
- Uzbekistan (8)
- Vietnam (1)
