= 1997 World Weightlifting Championships – Women's 54 kg =

The 1997 World Weightlifting Championships were held in Chiang Mai, Thailand from December 6 to December 14. The women's competition in the 54 kg division was staged on 8 December 1997.

== Medalists ==
Event	Gold		Silver		Bronze	
Snatch	Meng Xianjuan (CHN)	87.5 kg	Khin Moe Nwe (MYA)	85.0 kg	Kuo Ping-chun (TPE)	85.0 kg
Clean & Jerk	Meng Xianjuan (CHN)	117.5 kg	Ri Song-hui (PRK)	110.0 kg	Saipin Detsaeng (THA)	110.0 kg
Total	Meng Xianjuan (CHN)	205.0 kg	Ri Song-hui (PRK)	195.0 kg	Saipin Detsaeng (THA)	195.0 kg

== Records ==
Prior to this competition, the existing world records were as follows.

World Record	Snatch	Yang Xia (CHN)	93.5 kg	Yangzhou, China	9 July 1997
World Record	Clean & Jerk	Yang Xia (CHN)	115.0 kg	Yangzhou, China	9 July 1997
World Record	Total	Yang Xia (CHN)	207.5 kg	Yangzhou, China	9 July 1997

== Results ==
Rank	Athlete	Body weight	Snatch (kg)				Clean & Jerk (kg)				Total
Rank	Athlete	Body weight	1	2	3	Rank	1	2	3	Rank	Total
1st place, gold medalist(s)	Meng Xianjuan (CHN)	53.90	87.5	~~94.0~~	~~94.0~~	1st place, gold medalist(s)	100.0	115.0	117.5	1st place, gold medalist(s)	205.0
2nd place, silver medalist(s)	Ri Song-hui (PRK)	53.60	85.0	~~90.0~~	~~90.0~~	4	110.0	~~112.5~~	~~112.5~~	2nd place, silver medalist(s)	195.0
3rd place, bronze medalist(s)	Saipin Detsaeng (THA)	53.65	75.0	85.0	~~90.0~~	5	105.0	110.0	~~112.5~~	3rd place, bronze medalist(s)	195.0
4	Neli Yankova (BUL)	53.00	77.5	~~82.5~~	82.5	6	97.5	102.5	105.0	5	187.5
5	Maryse Turcotte (CAN)	53.15	~~75.0~~	75.0	80.0	8	102.5	107.5	~~110.0~~	4	187.5
6	Khin Moe Nwe (MYA)	53.35	80.0	85.0	~~87.5~~	2nd place, silver medalist(s)	100.0	~~110.0~~	~~110.0~~	6	185.0
7	Rungarun Paljai (THA)	53.35	77.5	82.5	~~85.0~~	7	95.0	100.0	~~105.0~~	7	182.5
8	Nandini Devi (IND)	53.80	75.0	80.0	~~82.5~~	10	97.5	~~102.5~~	~~102.5~~	10	177.5
9	Dagmar Daneková (SVK)	52.50	72.5	77.5	~~80.0~~	11	92.5	~~97.5~~	97.5	8	175.0
10	Mari Nakaga (JPN)	53.60	75.0	~~80.0~~	80.0	9	~~95.0~~	95.0	~~100.0~~	13	175.0
11	Melanie Pritchard (USA)	53.60	75.0	~~77.5~~	~~77.5~~	13	97.5	~~105.0~~	~~105.0~~	9	172.5
12	Emilia Fernández (ESP)	53.40	70.0	72.5	75.0	12	90.0	92.5	95.0	12	170.0
13	Nancy Maneiro (VEN)	51.95	67.5	70.0	72.5	14	87.5	92.5	95.0	11	167.5
14	Soraya Jiménez (MEX)	54.00	70.0	~~72.5~~	~~72.5~~	16	90.0	95.0	~~97.5~~	14	165.0
15	Micol Dal Nevo (ITA)	54.00	~~65.0~~	~~65.0~~	65.0	17	85.0	~~90.0~~	90.0	15	155.0
16	Teresa van der Stoep (NED)	53.75	~~70.0~~	70.0	~~72.5~~	15	~~80.0~~	80.0	~~82.5~~	17	150.0
17	Rabab Ashour (EGY)	53.25	60.0	~~65.0~~	~~65.0~~	18	75.0	~~77.5~~	77.5	18	137.5
—	Kuo Ping-chun (TPE)	53.45	82.5	~~85.0~~	85.0	3rd place, bronze medalist(s)	~~107.5~~	~~107.5~~	~~107.5~~	—	—
—	Ana-Maria Iagăru (ROM)	53.10	~~62.5~~	~~62.5~~	~~62.5~~	—	70.0	80.0	~~90.0~~	16	—

== New records ==
Clean & Jerk	117.5 kg	Meng Xianjuan (CHN)	WR
