= List of Thai records in Olympic weightlifting =

The following are the records of Thailand in Olympic weightlifting. Records are maintained in each weight class for the snatch lift, clean and jerk lift, and the total for both lifts by the Thai Amateur Weightlifting Association (TAWA).

== Current records ==
=== Men ===
Event	Record	Athlete	Date	Meet	Place	Ref
60 kg
Snatch	131 kg	Theerapong Silachai	13 December 2025	SEA Games	Chonburi, Thailand	
Clean & Jerk	173 kg	Theerapong Silachai	13 December 2025	SEA Games	Chonburi, Thailand	
Total	304 kg	Theerapong Silachai	13 December 2025	SEA Games	Chonburi, Thailand	
65 kg
Snatch	134 kg	Patsaphong Thongsuk	14 December 2025	SEA Games	Chonburi, Thailand	
Clean & Jerk	173 kg	Patsaphong Thongsuk	14 December 2025	SEA Games	Chonburi, Thailand	
Total	307 kg	Patsaphong Thongsuk	14 December 2025	SEA Games	Chonburi, Thailand	
70 kg
Snatch	137 kg	Teerawat Ratphet	26 September 2026	Asian Games	Nagoya, Japan	
Clean & Jerk	170 kg	Teerawat Ratphet	26 September 2026	Asian Games	Nagoya, Japan	
Total	307 kg	Teerawat Ratphet	26 September 2026	Asian Games	Nagoya, Japan	
75 kg
Snatch	160 kg	Weeraphon Wichuma	26 September 2026	Asian Games	Nagoya, Japan	
Clean & Jerk	205 kg	Weeraphon Wichuma	26 September 2026	Asian Games	Nagoya, Japan	
Total	365 kg	Weeraphon Wichuma	26 September 2026	Asian Games	Nagoya, Japan	
85 kg
Snatch	145 kg	Worrapot Nasuriwong	28 September 2026	Asian Games	Nagoya, Japan	
Clean & Jerk	185 kg	Worrapot Nasuriwong	28 September 2026	Asian Games	Nagoya, Japan	
Total	330 kg	Worrapot Nasuriwong	28 September 2026	Asian Games	Nagoya, Japan	
94 kg
Snatch	165 kg	Sumpradit Sarat	16 December 2025	SEA Games	Chonburi, Thailand	
Clean & Jerk	201 kg	Sumpradit Sarat	16 December 2025	SEA Games	Chonburi, Thailand	
Total	336 kg	Sumpradit Sarat	16 December 2025	SEA Games	Chonburi, Thailand	
110 kg
Snatch	160 kg	Yothaphon Rungsuriya	17 December 2025	SEA Games	Chonburi, Thailand	
Clean & Jerk	205 kg	Yothaphon Rungsuriya	17 December 2025	SEA Games	Chonburi, Thailand	
Total	365 kg	Yothaphon Rungsuriya	17 December 2025	SEA Games	Chonburi, Thailand	
+110 kg
Snatch						
Clean & Jerk						
Total						

=== Women ===
Event	Record	Athlete	Date	Meet	Place	Ref
48 kg
Snatch	83 kg	Sukcharoen Thanyathon	13 December 2025	SEA Games	Chonburi, Thailand	
Clean & Jerk	100 kg	Sukcharoen Thanyathon	13 December 2025	SEA Games	Chonburi, Thailand	
Total	183 kg	Sukcharoen Thanyathon	13 December 2025	SEA Games	Chonburi, Thailand	
53 kg
Snatch	89 kg	Khambao Surodchana	13 December 2025	SEA Games	Chonburi, Thailand	
Clean & Jerk	115 kg	Khambao Surodchana	13 December 2025	SEA Games	Chonburi, Thailand	
Total	204 kg	Khambao Surodchana	13 December 2025	SEA Games	Chonburi, Thailand	
58 kg
Snatch	96 kg	Yodsarn Suratwadee	14 December 2025	SEA Games	Chonburi, Thailand	
Clean & Jerk	128 kg	Yodsarn Suratwadee	14 December 2025	SEA Games	Chonburi, Thailand	
Total	224 kg	Yodsarn Suratwadee	14 December 2025	SEA Games	Chonburi, Thailand	
63 kg
Snatch	98 kg	Saetia Thanaporn	15 December 2025	SEA Games	Chonburi, Thailand	
Clean & Jerk	120 kg	Saetia Thanaporn	15 December 2025	SEA Games	Chonburi, Thailand	
Total	218 kg	Saetia Thanaporn	15 December 2025	SEA Games	Chonburi, Thailand	
69 kg
Snatch	101 kg	Phattharathida Wongsing	15 December 2025	SEA Games	Chonburi, Thailand	
Clean & Jerk	128 kg	Phattharathida Wongsing	15 December 2025	SEA Games	Chonburi, Thailand	
Total	229 kg	Phattharathida Wongsing	15 December 2025	SEA Games	Chonburi, Thailand	
77 kg
Snatch	94 kg	Chalida Taingdee	17 December 2025	SEA Games	Chonburi, Thailand	
Clean & Jerk	120 kg	Chalida Taingdee	17 December 2025	SEA Games	Chonburi, Thailand	
Total	214 kg	Chalida Taingdee	17 December 2025	SEA Games	Chonburi, Thailand	
86 kg
Snatch						
Clean & Jerk						
Total						
+86 kg
Snatch						
Clean & Jerk						
Total						

== Historical records ==
=== Men (2018–2025) ===
Event	Record	Athlete	Date	Meet	Place	Ref
55 kg
Snatch	119 kg	Natthawat Chomchuen	1 April 2024	World Cup	Phuket, Thailand	
Clean & Jerk	150 kg	Natthawat Chomchuen	1 April 2024	World Cup	Phuket, Thailand	
Total	269 kg	Natthawat Chomchuen	1 April 2024	World Cup	Phuket, Thailand	
61 kg
Snatch	132 kg	Theerapong Silachai	6 May 2023	Asian Championships	Jinju, South Korea	
Clean & Jerk	171 kg	Theerapong Silachai	2 April 2024	World Cup	Phuket, Thailand	
Total	299 kg	Theerapong Silachai	6 May 2023	Asian Championships	Jinju, South Korea	
67 kg
Snatch	140 kg	Weeraphon Wichuma	4 May 2022	Junior World Championships	Heraklion, Greece	
Clean & Jerk	174 kg	Anucha Doungsri	10 December 2021	World Championships	Tashkent, Uzbekistan	
Total	312 kg	Anucha Doungsri	10 December 2021	World Championships	Tashkent, Uzbekistan	
73 kg
Snatch	156 kg	Weeraphon Wichuma	3 October 2023	Asian Games	Hangzhou, China	
Clean & Jerk	198 kg	Weeraphon Wichuma	8 August 2024	Olympic Games	Paris, France	
Total	351 kg	Weeraphon Wichuma	3 October 2023	Asian Games	Hangzhou, China	
81 kg
Snatch	156 kg	Nonthaphat Thaneewan	12 December 2021	World Championships	Tashkent, Uzbekistan	
Clean & Jerk	200 kg	Suepsuan Natthawut	21 May 2022	Southeast Asian Games	Hanoi, Vietnam	
Total	355 kg	Suepsuan Natthawut	21 May 2022	Southeast Asian Games	Hanoi, Vietnam	
89 kg
Snatch	145 kg	Phacharamethi Tharaphan	10 September 2023	World Championships	Riyadh, Saudi Arabia	
Clean & Jerk	195 kg	Phacharamethi Tharaphan	13 December 2021	World Championships	Tashkent, Uzbekistan	
Total	339 kg	Phacharamethi Tharaphan	10 September 2023	World Championships	Riyadh, Saudi Arabia	
96 kg
Snatch	176 kg	Sarat Sumpradit	5 October 2023	Asian Games	Hangzhou, China	
Clean & Jerk	208 kg	Sarat Sumpradit	5 October 2023	Asian Games	Hangzhou, China	
Total	384 kg	Sarat Sumpradit	5 October 2023	Asian Games	Hangzhou, China	
102 kg
Snatch						
Clean & Jerk						
Total						
109 kg
Snatch						
Clean & Jerk						
Total						
+109 kg
Snatch	157 kg	Rungsuriya Panya	16 October 2022	Asian Championships	Manama, Bahrain	
Clean & Jerk	202 kg	Rungsuriya Panya	11 April 2024	World Cup	Phuket, Thailand	
Total	358 kg	Rungsuriya Panya	11 April 2024	World Cup	Phuket, Thailand	

=== Women (2018–2025) ===
Event	Record	Athlete	Date	Meet	Place	Ref
45 kg
Snatch	79 kg	Thanyathon Sukcharoen	19 May 2022	Southeast Asian Games	Hanoi, Vietnam	
Clean & Jerk	101 kg	Sirivimon Pramongkhol	4 September 2023	World Championships	Riyadh, Saudi Arabia	
Total	179 kg	Sirivimon Pramongkhol	4 September 2023	World Championships	Riyadh, Saudi Arabia	
49 kg
Snatch	93 kg	Sopita Tanasan	3 November 2018	World Championships	Ashgabat, Turkmenistan	
Clean & Jerk	120 kg	Chayuttra Pramongkhol	3 November 2018	World Championships	Ashgabat, Turkmenistan	
Total	209 kg	Chayuttra Pramongkhol	3 November 2018	World Championships	Ashgabat, Turkmenistan	
55 kg
Snatch	105 kg	Sukanya Srisurat	3 November 2018	World Championships	Ashgabat, Turkmenistan	
Clean & Jerk	127 kg	Sukanya Srisurat	3 November 2018	World Championships	Ashgabat, Turkmenistan	
Total	232 kg	Sukanya Srisurat	3 November 2018	World Championships	Ashgabat, Turkmenistan	
59 kg
Snatch	97 kg	Thanaporn Saetia	2 October 2023	Asian Games	Hangzhou, China	
Clean & Jerk	119 kg	Suratwadee Yodsarn	8 September 2023	World Championships	Riyadh, Saudi Arabia	
Total	211 kg	Thanaporn Saetia	2 May 2025	World Junior Championships	Lima, Peru	
64 kg
Snatch	93 kg	Rodsukon Sonkaew	21 May 2022	Southeast Asian Games	Hanoi, Vietnam	
Clean & Jerk	117 kg	Rodsukon Sonkaew	12 December 2021	World Championships	Tashkent, Uzbekistan	
Total	210 kg	Rodsukon Sonkaew	21 May 2022	Southeast Asian Games	Hanoi, Vietnam	
71 kg
Snatch	103 kg	Siriyakorn Khaipandung	21 May 2022	Southeast Asian Games	Hanoi, Vietnam	
Clean & Jerk	124 kg	Phattharathida Wongsing	3 May 2025	World Junior Championships	Lima, Peru	
Total	225 kg	Phattharathida Wongsing	3 May 2025	World Junior Championships	Lima, Peru	
76 kg
Snatch	110 kg	Siriyakorn Khaipandung	10 May 2023	Asian Championships	Jinju, South Korea	
Clean & Jerk	127 kg	Siriyakorn Khaipandung	10 May 2023	Asian Championships	Jinju, South Korea	
Total	237 kg	Siriyakorn Khaipandung	10 May 2023	Asian Championships	Jinju, South Korea	
81 kg
Snatch	93 kg	Siriyakorn Khaipandung	15 September 2023	World Championships	Riyadh, Saudi Arabia	
Clean & Jerk						
Total						
87 kg
Snatch						
Clean & Jerk						
Total						
+87 kg
Snatch	124 kg	Duangaksorn Chaidee	17 December 2021	World Championships	Tashkent, Uzbekistan	
Clean & Jerk	158 kg	Duangaksorn Chaidee	10 April 2024	World Cup	Phuket, Thailand	
Total	281 kg	Duangaksorn Chaidee	17 December 2021	World Championships	Tashkent, Uzbekistan	

=== Men (1998–2018) ===
Event	Record	Athlete	Date	Meet	Place	Ref
-56 kg
Snatch	132 kg	Sinphet Kruaithong	7 August 2016	Olympic Games	Rio de Janeiro, Brazil	
Clean & Jerk	157 kg	Sinphet Kruaithong	7 August 2016	Olympic Games	Rio de Janeiro, Brazil	
Total	289 kg	Sinphet Kruaithong	7 August 2016	Olympic Games	Rio de Janeiro, Brazil	
-62 kg
Snatch	132.5 kg	Chom Singnoi	2 October 2002	Asian Games	Busan, South Korea	
Clean & Jerk	162 kg	Phaisan Hansawong	11 August 2008	Olympic Games	Beijing, China	
Total	294 kg	Phaisan Hansawong	11 August 2008	Olympic Games	Beijing, China	
-69 kg
Snatch	147 kg	Sitthisak Suphalak	12 August 2008	Olympic Games	Beijing, China	
Clean & Jerk	180 kg	Phaisan Hansawong	11 December 2009	Southeast Asian Games	Vientiane, Laos	
Total	321 kg	Tairat Bunsuk	1 December 2017	World Championships	Anaheim, United States	
-77 kg
Snatch	165 kg	Chatuphum Chinnawong	10 August 2016	Olympic Games	Rio de Janeiro, Brazil	
Clean & Jerk	191 kg	Chatuphum Chinnawong	1 August 2012	Olympic Games	London, United Kingdom	
Total	356 kg	Chatuphum Chinnawong	10 August 2016	Olympic Games	Rio de Janeiro, Brazil	
-85 kg
Snatch	152 kg	Pitaya Tibnoke	3 August 2016	Olympic Games	London, United Kingdom	
Clean & Jerk	196 kg	Pitaya Tibnoke	3 August 2016	Olympic Games	London, United Kingdom	
Total	348 kg	Pitaya Tibnoke	3 August 2016	Olympic Games	London, United Kingdom	
-94 kg
Snatch	177 kg	Sarat Sumpradit	13 August 2016	Olympic Games	Rio de Janeiro, Brazil	
Clean & Jerk	214 kg	Sarat Sumpradit	24 August 2017	Universiade	Taipei, Taiwan	
Total	390 kg	Sarat Sumpradit	13 August 2016	Olympic Games	Rio de Janeiro, Brazil	
-105 kg
Snatch	160 kg	Suthiphon Watthanakasikam	2 July 2006	University World Cup	İzmir, Turkey	
Clean & Jerk	202 kg	Khunchai Nuchpum	15 May 2009	Asian Championships	Taldykorgan, Kazakhstan	
Total	362 kg	Khunchai Nuchpum	15 May 2009	Asian Championships	Taldykorgan, Kazakhstan	
+105 kg
Snatch	160 kg	Surapong Watthanakasikam	11 November 2011	Southeast Asian Games	Jakarta, Indonesia	
Clean & Jerk	201 kg	Surapong Watthanakasikam	11 November 2011	Southeast Asian Games	Jakarta, Indonesia	
Total	361 kg	Surapong Watthanakasikam	11 November 2011	Southeast Asian Games	Jakarta, Indonesia	

=== Women (1998–2018) ===
Event	Record	Athlete	Date	Meet	Place	Ref
-48 kg
Snatch	92 kg	Sopita Tanasan	6 August 2016	Olympic Games	Rio de Janeiro, Brazil	
Clean & Jerk	115 kg	Aree Wiratthaworn	14 August 2004	Olympic Games	Athens, Greece	
Total	203 kg	Pensiri Laosirikul	26 September 2005	Asian Championships	Dubai, United Arab Emirates	
-53 kg
Snatch	100 kg	Udomporn Polsak	16 November 2003	World Championships	Vancouver, Canada	
Clean & Jerk	126 kg	Prapawadee Jaroenrattanatarakoon	10 August 2008	Olympic Games	Beijing, China	
Total	223 kg	Prapawadee Jaroenrattanatarakoon	10 November 2005	World Championships	Doha, Qatar	
-58 kg
Snatch	110 kg	Sukanya Srisurat	8 August 2016	Olympic Games	Rio de Janeiro, Brazil	
Clean & Jerk	136 kg	Pimsiri Sirikaew	30 July 2012	Olympic Games	London, United Kingdom	
Total	240 kg	Sukanya Srisurat	8 August 2016	Olympic Games	Rio de Janeiro, Brazil	
-63 kg
Snatch	116 kg	Pawina Thongsuk	12 November 2005	World Championships	Doha, Qatar	
Clean & Jerk	142 kg	Pawina Thongsuk	4 December 2006	Asian Games	Doha, Qatar	
Total	256 kg	Pawina Thongsuk	12 November 2005	World Championships	Doha, Qatar	
-69 kg
Snatch	117.5 kg	Pawina Thongsuk	9 April 2004	Asian Championships	Almaty, Kazakhstan	
Clean & Jerk	147.5 kg	Pawina Thongsuk	22 November 2002	Weightlifting Championships	Warsaw, Poland	
Total	262.5 kg	Pawina Thongsuk	9 April 2004	Asian Championships	Almaty, Kazakhstan	
-75 kg
Snatch	122.5 kg	Pawina Thongsuk	20 August 2004	Olympic Games	Athens, Greece	
Clean & Jerk	150 kg	Pawina Thongsuk	20 August 2004	Olympic Games	Athens, Greece	
Total	272.5 kg	Pawina Thongsuk	20 August 2004	Olympic Games	Athens, Greece	
+75 kg
Snatch	136 kg	Chitchanok Pulsabsakul	27 November 2015	World Championships	Houston, United States	
Clean & Jerk	163 kg	Praeonapa Khenjantuek	16 November 2014	World Championships	Almaty, Kazakhstan	
Total	296 kg	Chitchanok Pulsabsakul	27 November 2015	World Championships	Houston, United States	
