= Weightlifting at the 2002 Asian Games – Women's 69 kg =

Weightlifting competition

Women's 69 kg at the 2002 Asian Games
- Venue: Pukyong National University Gymnasium
- Date: 6 October 2002
- Competitors: 7 from 6 nations

Medalists
gold medal	Liu Chunhong	China
silver medal	Pawina Thongsuk	Thailand
bronze medal	Mya Sanda Oo	Myanmar

The women's 69 kilograms event at the 2002 Asian Games took place on October 6, 2002 at Pukyong National University Gymnasium.

== Schedule ==
All times are Korea Standard Time (UTC+09:00)

Date	Time	Event
Sunday, 6 October 2002	15:00	Group A

== Records ==
Prior to this competition, the existing world, Asian and Games records were as follows.

World Record	Snatch	Valentina Popova (RUS)	115.0 kg	Antalya, Turkey	8 November 2001
World Record	Clean & Jerk	Liu Chunhong (CHN)	147.5 kg	Havířov, Czech Republic	3 June 2002
World Record	Total	Valentina Popova (RUS)	257.5 kg	Antalya, Turkey	8 November 2001
Asian Record	Snatch	Liu Dongping (CHN)	111.5 kg	Prague, Czech Republic	6 July 2000
Asian Record	Clean & Jerk	Liu Chunhong (CHN)	147.5 kg	Havířov, Czech Republic	3 June 2002
Asian Record	Total	Lin Weining (CHN)	252.5 kg	Wuhan, China	3 September 1999
Games Record	Snatch	Sun Tianni (CHN)	111.0 kg	Bangkok, Thailand	11 December 1998
Games Record	Clean & Jerk	Sun Tianni (CHN)	135.0 kg	Bangkok, Thailand	11 December 1998
Games Record	Total	Sun Tianni (CHN)	245.0 kg	Bangkok, Thailand	11 December 1998

== Results ==
Legend

- NM — No mark

Rank	Athlete	Body weight	Snatch (kg)				Clean & Jerk (kg)				Total
Rank	Athlete	Body weight	1	2	3	Result	1	2	3	Result	Total
1st place, gold medalist(s)	Liu Chunhong (CHN)	68.45	110.0	~~115.5~~	115.5	115.0	142.5	145.0	148.0	147.5	262.5
2nd place, silver medalist(s)	Pawina Thongsuk (THA)	68.20	105.0	110.0	115.0	115.0	~~140.0~~	140.0	145.0	145.0	260.0
3rd place, bronze medalist(s)	Mya Sanda Oo (MYA)	68.25	105.0	110.0	112.5	112.5	~~137.5~~	137.5	~~150.0~~	137.5	250.0
4	Kim Choon-ran (KOR)	68.60	~~97.5~~	97.5	~~102.5~~	97.5	120.0	~~125.0~~	~~125.0~~	120.0	217.5
5	Kang Mi-suk (KOR)	68.95	97.5	~~102.5~~	~~102.5~~	97.5	115.0	120.0	~~122.5~~	120.0	217.5
6	Jon Myong-hui (PRK)	68.85	92.5	~~97.5~~	~~97.5~~	92.5	122.5	~~127.5~~	~~127.5~~	122.5	215.0
—	Huang Shih-chun (TPE)	68.25	~~102.5~~	~~107.5~~	~~107.5~~	—	—	—	—	—	NM

== New records ==
The following records were established during the competition.

Snatch	112.5	Mya Sanda Oo (MYA)	AR
Snatch	115.0	Pawina Thongsuk (THA)	AR
Snatch	115.5	Liu Chunhong (CHN)	WR
Clean & Jerk	137.5	Mya Sanda Oo (MYA)	GR
Clean & Jerk	140.0	Pawina Thongsuk (THA)	GR
Clean & Jerk	142.5	Liu Chunhong (CHN)	GR
Clean & Jerk	145.0	Liu Chunhong (CHN)	GR
Clean & Jerk	148.0	Liu Chunhong (CHN)	WR
Total	250.0	Mya Sanda Oo (MYA)	GR
Total	255.0	Pawina Thongsuk (THA)	AR
Total	257.5	Liu Chunhong (CHN)	AR
Total	260.0	Liu Chunhong (CHN)	WR
Total	262.5	Liu Chunhong (CHN)	WR
