= 1997 World Weightlifting Championships – Women's 64 kg =

The 1997 World Weightlifting Championships were held in Chiang Mai, Thailand from December 6 to December 14. The women's competition in the 64 kg division was staged on 10 December 1997.

== Medalists ==
Event	Gold		Silver		Bronze	
Snatch	Chen Jui-lien (TPE)	102.5 kg	Chen Yanqing (CHN)	100.0 kg	Neelam Setti Laxmi (IND)	100.0 kg
Clean & Jerk	Chen Yanqing (CHN)	130.0 kg	Chen Jui-lien (TPE)	122.5 kg	Lu Yun (CHN)	122.5 kg
Total	Chen Yanqing (CHN)	230.0 kg	Chen Jui-lien (TPE)	225.0 kg	Neelam Setti Laxmi (IND)	217.5 kg

== Records ==
Prior to this competition, the existing world records were as follows.

World record	Snatch	Chen Xiaomin (CHN)	107.5 kg	Yangzhou, China	10 July 1997
World record	Clean & Jerk		130.5 kg		
World record	Total	Li Hongyun (CHN)	235.0 kg	Istanbul, Turkey	22 November 1994

== Results ==
Rank	Athlete	Body weight	Snatch (kg)				Clean & Jerk (kg)				Total
Rank	Athlete	Body weight	1	2	3	Rank	1	2	3	Rank	Total
1st place, gold medalist(s)	Chen Yanqing (CHN)	60.20	~~100.0~~	100.0	~~102.5~~	2nd place, silver medalist(s)	125.0	131.0	~~132.5~~	1st place, gold medalist(s)	230.0
2nd place, silver medalist(s)	Chen Jui-lien (TPE)	63.00	~~100.0~~	100.0	102.5	1st place, gold medalist(s)	120.0	122.5	~~125.0~~	2nd place, silver medalist(s)	225.0
3rd place, bronze medalist(s)	Neelam Setti Laxmi (IND)	62.50	92.5	97.5	100.0	3rd place, bronze medalist(s)	117.5	~~122.5~~	~~125.0~~	5	217.5
4	Pawina Thongsuk (THA)	63.15	92.5	97.5	~~102.5~~	4	~~117.5~~	117.5	~~122.5~~	6	215.0
5	Aphinya Pharksupho (THA)	63.45	85.0	90.0	95.0	5	112.5	117.5	120.0	4	215.0
6	Lu Yun (CHN)	63.05	90.0	~~95.0~~	~~95.0~~	8	115.0	122.5	~~127.5~~	3rd place, bronze medalist(s)	212.5
7	Erzsébet Márkus (HUN)	63.50	92.5	95.0	~~97.5~~	6	107.5	112.5	115.0	7	210.0
8	Choi Eun-ja (KOR)	63.65	85.0	~~90.0~~	90.0	11	~~115.0~~	115.0	~~122.5~~	8	205.0
9	Svetlana Khabirova (RUS)	63.30	85.0	90.0	~~95.0~~	9	107.5	110.0	112.5	9	202.5
10	Lea Rentmeester (USA)	63.95	~~92.5~~	92.5	~~95.0~~	7	107.5	~~112.5~~	~~115.0~~	12	200.0
11	Ioanna Chatziioannou (GRE)	63.05	85.0	~~90.0~~	~~90.0~~	13	107.5	~~112.5~~	~~112.5~~	10	192.5
12	Laure Mary (FRA)	63.30	85.0	~~87.5~~	~~87.5~~	14	102.5	107.5	~~110.0~~	11	192.5
13	Katia Iacuzzo (ITA)	62.95	85.0	~~90.0~~	~~90.0~~	12	105.0	~~107.5~~	~~107.5~~	13	190.0
14	Khoni Devi (IND)	63.55	72.5	77.5	80.0	16	100.0	105.0	~~110.0~~	14	185.0
15	Michelle Kettner (AUS)	63.30	80.0	~~85.0~~	~~85.0~~	15	~~100.0~~	100.0	102.5	15	182.5
16	Jay Saxton (GBR)	62.60	70.0	75.0	~~80.0~~	17	90.0	95.0	97.5	16	172.5
17	Genoveva Tiron (ROM)	62.20	70.0	~~75.0~~	~~75.0~~	18	85.0	~~95.0~~	~~95.0~~	17	155.0
—	Mya Sanda Oo (MYA)	63.45	90.0	~~95.0~~	~~95.0~~	10	~~120.0~~	~~120.0~~	~~120.0~~	—	—

== New records ==
Clean & Jerk	131.0 kg	Chen Yanqing (CHN)	WR
