= Weightlifting at the 1998 Asian Games – Women's 63 kg =

Women's 63 kg at the 1998 Asian Games
- Venue: Thunder Dome
- Date: 10 December 1998
- Competitors: 7 from 7 nations

Medalists
gold medal	Lei Li	China
silver medal	Karnam Malleswari	India
bronze medal	Chen Jui-lien	Chinese Taipei

The women's 63 kilograms event at the 1998 Asian Games took place on 10 December 1998 at Thunder Dome, Maung Thong Thani Sports Complex.

The weightlifter from China won the gold, with a combined lift of 232.5 kg.

Total score was the sum of the lifter's best result in each of the snatch and the clean and jerk, with three lifts allowed for each lift. In case of a tie, the lighter lifter won; if still tied, the lifter who took the fewest attempts to achieve the total score won. Lifters without a valid snatch score were allowed to perform the clean and jerk.

== Results ==
Legend

- NM — No mark

Rank	Athlete	Body weight	Snatch (kg)				Clean & Jerk (kg)				Total
Rank	Athlete	Body weight	1	2	3	Result	1	2	3	Result	Total
1st place, gold medalist(s)	Lei Li (CHN)	62.80	102.5	105.0	107.5	107.5	~~125.0~~	125.0	~~132.5~~	125.0	232.5
2nd place, silver medalist(s)	Karnam Malleswari (IND)	62.55	100.0	102.5	105.0	105.0	120.0	125.0	~~132.5~~	125.0	230.0
3rd place, bronze medalist(s)	Chen Jui-lien (TPE)	62.05	97.5	~~102.5~~	~~102.5~~	97.5	120.0	125.0	~~127.5~~	125.0	222.5
4	Mya Sanda Oo (MYA)	62.80	~~92.5~~	92.5	95.0	95.0	~~122.5~~	122.5	~~130.0~~	122.5	217.5
5	Saipin Detsaeng (THA)	62.45	90.0	97.5	~~102.5~~	97.5	115.0	~~122.5~~	~~127.5~~	115.0	212.5
6	Mami Nishikawa (JPN)	62.35	~~77.5~~	77.5	82.5	82.5	100.0	105.0	107.5	107.5	190.0
—	Yoon I-sook (KOR)	62.80	~~82.5~~	~~82.5~~	~~82.5~~	—	—	—	—	—	NM

== New records ==
The following records were established during the competition.

Snatch	105.0	Lei Li (CHN)	WR
Snatch	107.5	Lei Li (CHN)	WR
Total	232.5	Lei Li (CHN)	WR
