= 2002 World Weightlifting Championships – Women's 53 kg =

The 2002 World Weightlifting Championships were held in Warsaw, Poland from 19 November to 26 November. The women's 53 kilograms division was staged on 19 and 20 November 2002.

== Schedule ==
Date	Time	Event
19 November 2002	12:00	Group B
20 November 2002	14:00	Group A

== Medalists ==
Event	Gold		Silver		Bronze	
Snatch	Ri Song-hui (PRK)	97.5 kg	Li Xuejiu (CHN)	95.0 kg	Udomporn Polsak (THA)	95.0 kg
Clean & Jerk	Li Xuejiu (CHN)	127.5 kg	Ri Song-hui (PRK)	127.5 kg	Udomporn Polsak (THA)	120.0 kg
Total	Ri Song-hui (PRK)	225.0 kg	Li Xuejiu (CHN)	222.5 kg	Udomporn Polsak (THA)	215.0 kg

== Records ==
Prior to this competition, the existing world records were as follows.

World Record	Snatch	Ri Song-hui (PRK)	102.5 kg	Busan, South Korea	1 October 2002
World Record	Clean & Jerk	Yang Xia (CHN)	125.0 kg	Sydney, Australia	18 September 2000
World Record	Total	Yang Xia (CHN)	225.0 kg	Sydney, Australia	18 September 2000

== Results ==
Rank	Athlete	Group	Body weight	Snatch (kg)				Clean & Jerk (kg)				Total
Rank	Athlete	Group	Body weight	1	2	3	Rank	1	2	3	Rank	Total
1st place, gold medalist(s)	Ri Song-hui (PRK)	A	52.90	97.5	~~103.0~~	~~103.0~~	1st place, gold medalist(s)	122.5	125.5	127.5	2nd place, silver medalist(s)	225.0
2nd place, silver medalist(s)	Li Xuejiu (CHN)	A	52.85	90.0	92.5	95.0	2nd place, silver medalist(s)	115.0	120.0	127.5	1st place, gold medalist(s)	222.5
3rd place, bronze medalist(s)	Udomporn Polsak (THA)	A	52.95	90.0	~~95.0~~	95.0	3rd place, bronze medalist(s)	115.0	~~120.0~~	120.0	3rd place, bronze medalist(s)	215.0
4	Mabel Mosquera (COL)	A	52.60	~~85.0~~	85.0	90.0	4	110.0	~~115.0~~	115.0	4	205.0
5	Donka Mincheva (BUL)	A	52.50	87.5	~~92.5~~	~~92.5~~	5	110.0	~~115.0~~	~~117.5~~	5	197.5
6	Esmat Mansour (EGY)	A	52.95	75.0	80.0	~~82.5~~	8	100.0	107.5	~~112.5~~	6	187.5
7	Tara Nott (USA)	A	51.85	~~82.5~~	82.5	85.0	7	100.0	~~102.5~~	~~102.5~~	8	185.0
8	Fang Hsin-tzu (TPE)	A	52.15	75.0	~~80.0~~	~~80.0~~	12	100.0	105.0	~~110.0~~	7	180.0
9	Hiromi Miyake (JPN)	B	52.20	75.0	77.5	~~80.0~~	10	~~97.5~~	97.5	~~100.0~~	9	175.0
10	Estefanía Juan (ESP)	B	51.65	75.0	77.5	~~80.0~~	9	95.0	~~97.5~~	~~97.5~~	10	172.5
11	Lin Tsu-ling (TPE)	B	52.70	75.0	~~77.5~~	~~77.5~~	13	92.5	~~95.0~~	95.0	12	170.0
12	Natasha Barker (AUS)	B	52.95	72.5	77.5	~~80.0~~	11	92.5	~~97.5~~	~~97.5~~	15	170.0
13	Heidi Neubacher (AUT)	B	52.95	70.0	75.0	~~77.5~~	14	90.0	95.0	~~97.5~~	14	170.0
14	Virginie Lachaume (FRA)	B	52.25	70.0	72.5	~~75.0~~	15	90.0	95.0	~~97.5~~	11	167.5
15	Jo Calvino (GBR)	B	52.90	~~60.0~~	~~60.0~~	60.0	16	~~77.5~~	77.5	~~80.0~~	16	137.5
—	Alexandra Escobar (ECU)	A	52.75	87.5	~~90.0~~	~~92.5~~	6	~~110.0~~	~~110.0~~	~~110.0~~	—	—
—	Barbara Sachmacińska (POL)	A	52.85	~~75.0~~	~~75.0~~	~~75.0~~	—	~~95.0~~	~~95.0~~	95.0	13	—

== New records ==
Clean & Jerk	125.5 kg	Ri Song-hui (PRK)	WR
Clean & Jerk	127.5 kg	Li Xuejiu (CHN)	WR
