= Weightlifting at the 1998 Asian Games – Women's 58 kg =

Women's 58 kg at the 1998 Asian Games
- Venue: Thunder Dome
- Date: 9 December 1998
- Competitors: 7 from 6 nations

Medalists
gold medal	Chen Yanqing	China
silver medal	Ri Song-hui	North Korea
bronze medal	Khassaraporn Suta	Thailand

The women's 58 kilograms event at the 1998 Asian Games took place on 9 December 1998 at Thunder Dome, Maung Thong Thani Sports Complex.

The weightlifter from China won the gold, with a combined lift of 220 kg.

Total score was the sum of the lifter's best result in each of the snatch and the clean and jerk, with three lifts allowed for each lift. In case of a tie, the lighter lifter won; if still tied, the lifter who took the fewest attempts to achieve the total score won. Lifters without a valid snatch score were allowed to perform the clean and jerk.

== Results ==
Legend

- NM — No mark

Rank	Athlete	Body weight	Snatch (kg)				Clean & Jerk (kg)				Total
Rank	Athlete	Body weight	1	2	3	Result	1	2	3	Result	Total
1st place, gold medalist(s)	Chen Yanqing (CHN)	57.45	~~95.0~~	95.0	98.0	97.5	~~123.5~~	123.5	~~125.5~~	122.5	220.0
2nd place, silver medalist(s)	Ri Song-hui (PRK)	56.20	~~92.5~~	92.5	~~95.0~~	92.5	120.0	125.0	~~127.5~~	125.0	217.5
3rd place, bronze medalist(s)	Khassaraporn Suta (THA)	57.20	90.0	~~95.0~~	~~95.0~~	90.0	120.0	~~125.0~~	~~127.5~~	120.0	210.0
4	Khin Moe Nwe (MYA)	57.60	90.0	~~95.0~~	~~95.0~~	90.0	115.0	~~122.5~~	~~122.5~~	115.0	205.0
5	Rungarun Paljai (THA)	56.75	85.0	~~90.0~~	~~90.0~~	85.0	~~107.5~~	107.5	~~112.5~~	107.5	192.5
6	Olga Sablina (KAZ)	57.40	75.0	~~80.0~~	~~80.0~~	75.0	~~105.0~~	105.0	110.0	110.0	185.0
—	Pratima Kumari (IND)	57.80	~~85.0~~	~~85.0~~	~~85.0~~	—	~~105.0~~	105.0	~~110.0~~	105.0	NM

== New records ==
The following records were established during the competition.

Snatch	98.0	Chen Yanqing (CHN)	WR
Clean & Jerk	123.5	Chen Yanqing (CHN)	WR
Clean & Jerk	125.0	Ri Song-hui (PRK)	WR
