= Weightlifting at the 2002 Asian Games – Women's 75 kg =

Women's 75 kg at the 2002 Asian Games
- Venue: Pukyong National University Gymnasium
- Date: 7 October 2002
- Competitors: 6 from 6 nations

Medalists
gold medal	Sun Ruiping	China
silver medal	Tatyana Khromova	Kazakhstan
bronze medal	Kim Soon-hee	South Korea

The women's 75 kilograms event at the 2002 Asian Games took place on October 7, 2002 at Pukyong National University Gymnasium.

== Schedule ==
All times are Korea Standard Time (UTC+09:00)

Date	Time	Event
Monday, 7 October 2002	15:00	Group A

== Records ==
Prior to this competition, the existing world, Asian and Games records were as follows.

World Record	Snatch	Tang Weifang (CHN)	116.0 kg	Wuhan, China	3 September 1999
World Record	Clean & Jerk	Gyöngyi Likerecz (HUN)	143.0 kg	Havířov, Czech Republic	4 June 2002
World Record	Total	Sun Tianni (CHN)	257.5 kg	Osaka, Japan	6 May 2000
Asian Record	Snatch	Tang Weifang (CHN)	116.0 kg	Wuhan, China	3 September 1999
Asian Record	Clean & Jerk	Sun Tianni (CHN)	142.5 kg	Osaka, Japan	6 May 2000
Asian Record	Total	Sun Tianni (CHN)	257.5 kg	Osaka, Japan	6 May 2000
Games Record	Snatch	Wei Xiangying (CHN)	115.0 kg	Bangkok, Thailand	12 December 1998
Games Record	Clean & Jerk	Aye Mon Khin (MYA)	130.0 kg	Bangkok, Thailand	12 December 1998
Games Record	Total	Wei Xiangying (CHN)	242.5 kg	Bangkok, Thailand	12 December 1998

== Results ==
Rank	Athlete	Body weight	Snatch (kg)				Clean & Jerk (kg)				Total
Rank	Athlete	Body weight	1	2	3	Result	1	2	3	Result	Total
1st place, gold medalist(s)	Sun Ruiping (CHN)	74.40	110.0	115.0	118.5	117.5	140.0	145.0	152.5	152.5	270.0
2nd place, silver medalist(s)	Tatyana Khromova (KAZ)	74.90	110.0	115.0	118.0	117.5	130.0	~~140.0~~	140.0	140.0	257.5
3rd place, bronze medalist(s)	Kim Soon-hee (KOR)	74.80	102.5	~~107.5~~	~~107.5~~	102.5	130.0	135.0	140.0	140.0	242.5
4	Cho Cho Win (MYA)	73.70	~~102.5~~	~~102.5~~	102.5	102.5	127.5	132.5	~~137.5~~	132.5	235.0
5	Shailaja Pujari (IND)	73.20	95.0	~~97.5~~	~~97.5~~	95.0	122.5	127.5	~~130.0~~	127.5	222.5
6	Rika Saito (JPN)	69.25	~~77.5~~	77.5	82.5	82.5	100.0	105.0	110.0	110.0	192.5

== New records ==
The following records were established during the competition.

Snatch	118.0	Tatyana Khromova (KAZ)	WR
Snatch	118.5	Sun Ruiping (CHN)	WR
Clean & Jerk	132.5	Cho Cho Win (MYA)	GR
Clean & Jerk	135.0	Kim Soon-hee (KOR)	GR
Clean & Jerk	140.0	Sun Ruiping (CHN)	GR
Clean & Jerk	145.0	Sun Ruiping (CHN)	WR
Clean & Jerk	152.5	Sun Ruiping (CHN)	WR
Total	247.5	Tatyana Khromova (KAZ)	GR
Total	257.5	Sun Ruiping (CHN)	GR
Total	262.5	Sun Ruiping (CHN)	WR
Total	270.0	Sun Ruiping (CHN)	WR
