= Weightlifting at the 1998 Asian Games – Women's 53 kg =

Women's 53 kg at the 1998 Asian Games
- Venue: Thunder Dome
- Date: 8 December 1998
- Competitors: 12 from 9 nations

Medalists
gold medal	Yang Xia	China
silver medal	Li Feng-ying	Chinese Taipei
bronze medal	Swe Swe Win	Myanmar

The women's 53 kilograms event at the 1998 Asian Games took place on 8 December 1998 at Thunder Dome, Maung Thong Thani Sports Complex.

The weightlifter from China won the gold, with a combined lift of 212.5 kg.

Total score was the sum of the lifter's best result in each of the snatch and the clean and jerk, with three lifts allowed for each lift. In case of a tie, the lighter lifter won; if still tied, the lifter who took the fewest attempts to achieve the total score won. Lifters without a valid snatch score were allowed to perform the clean and jerk.

== Results ==
Rank	Athlete	Body weight	Snatch (kg)				Clean & Jerk (kg)				Total
Rank	Athlete	Body weight	1	2	3	Result	1	2	3	Result	Total
1st place, gold medalist(s)	Yang Xia (CHN)	52.75	87.5	90.0	92.5	92.5	118.0	120.0	—	120.0	212.5
2nd place, silver medalist(s)	Li Feng-ying (TPE)	52.55	85.0	90.0	~~92.5~~	90.0	~~112.5~~	112.5	~~118.5~~	112.5	202.5
3rd place, bronze medalist(s)	Swe Swe Win (MYA)	52.25	80.0	85.0	87.5	87.5	107.5	110.0	~~112.5~~	110.0	197.5
4	Supeni Wasiman (INA)	52.55	85.0	~~87.5~~	87.5	87.5	107.5	110.0	~~112.5~~	110.0	197.5
5	Ri Yong-hwa (PRK)	52.45	~~85.0~~	85.0	87.5	87.5	~~105.0~~	105.0	~~110.0~~	105.0	192.5
6	Winarni Binti Slamet (INA)	51.15	82.5	~~85.0~~	85.0	85.0	105.0	~~110.0~~	~~110.0~~	105.0	190.0
7	Sanamacha Chanu (IND)	52.25	80.0	~~82.5~~	82.5	82.5	105.0	~~110.0~~	~~110.0~~	105.0	187.5
8	Taengmo Muangpho (THA)	52.15	~~85.0~~	85.0	~~87.5~~	85.0	100.0	~~105.0~~	~~105.0~~	100.0	185.0
9	Kang Pong-nyo (PRK)	52.95	~~80.0~~	80.0	~~82.5~~	80.0	105.0	~~110.0~~	~~110.0~~	105.0	185.0
10	Mari Nakaga (JPN)	53.00	~~77.5~~	77.5	80.0	80.0	~~100.0~~	100.0	102.5	102.5	182.5
11	Noriko Hasegawa (JPN)	52.00	~~75.0~~	75.0	77.5	77.5	97.5	100.0	~~102.5~~	100.0	177.5
12	Choi Myung-shik (KOR)	52.55	75.0	~~80.0~~	~~80.0~~	75.0	97.5	102.5	~~107.5~~	102.5	177.5

== New records ==
The following records were established during the competition.

Clean & Jerk	118.0	Yang Xia (CHN)	WR
Clean & Jerk	120.0	Yang Xia (CHN)	WR
Total	212.5	Yang Xia (CHN)	WR
