= 2005 World Weightlifting Championships – Women's 63 kg =

The 2005 World Weightlifting Championships were held in Doha, Qatar from 9 November to 17 November. The women's 63 kilograms division was staged on 12 November 2005.

== Schedule ==
Date	Time	Event
12 November 2005	13:00	Group B
12 November 2005	17:30	Group A

== Medalists ==
Event	Gold		Silver		Bronze	
Snatch	Pawina Thongsuk (THA)	116 kg	Svetlana Shimkova (RUS)	108 kg	Liu Xia (CHN)	105 kg
Clean & Jerk	Pawina Thongsuk (THA)	140 kg	Svetlana Shimkova (RUS)	139 kg	Liu Xia (CHN)	133 kg
Total	Pawina Thongsuk (THA)	256 kg	Svetlana Shimkova (RUS)	247 kg	Liu Xia (CHN)	238 kg

== Records ==
Prior to this competition, the existing world records were as follows.

World record	Snatch	Hanna Batsiushka (BLR)	115 kg	Athens, Greece	18 August 2004
World record	Clean & Jerk	Nataliya Skakun (UKR)	138 kg	Vancouver, Canada	18 November 2003
World record	Total	Liu Xia (CHN)	247 kg	Qinhuangdao, China	12 September 2003

== Results ==
Rank	Athlete	Group	Body weight	Snatch (kg)				Clean & Jerk (kg)				Total
Rank	Athlete	Group	Body weight	1	2	3	Rank	1	2	3	Rank	Total
1st place, gold medalist(s)	Pawina Thongsuk (THA)	A	62.54	105	110	116	1st place, gold medalist(s)	135	140	~~145~~	1st place, gold medalist(s)	256
2nd place, silver medalist(s)	Svetlana Shimkova (RUS)	A	62.75	~~105~~	105	108	2nd place, silver medalist(s)	132	~~137~~	139	2nd place, silver medalist(s)	247
3rd place, bronze medalist(s)	Liu Xia (CHN)	A	62.30	97	102	105	3rd place, bronze medalist(s)	128	133	~~138~~	3rd place, bronze medalist(s)	238
4	Dominika Misterska (POL)	A	62.53	~~95~~	~~95~~	95	5	120	~~123~~	~~123~~	4	215
5	Leydi Solís (COL)	B	62.39	90	~~92~~	92	7	110	115	117	5	209
6	Zlatina Atanasova (BUL)	A	62.51	85	~~90~~	90	9	110	115	~~120~~	6	205
7	Natalie Woolfolk (USA)	B	61.91	~~96~~	~~96~~	96	4	104	~~108~~	108	12	204
8	Lenka Orságová (CZE)	A	62.35	88	~~92~~	92	6	110	~~112~~	~~113~~	11	202
9	Solsiris Francisco (PUR)	B	62.59	~~85~~	85	90	10	105	110	112	8	202
10	Mónica Picón (COL)	B	58.53	85	88	~~90~~	11	106	110	113	7	201
11	Olibia Toka (GRE)	B	61.95	~~87~~	87	91	8	105	~~110~~	110	10	201
12	Milka Maneva (BUL)	B	62.18	~~83~~	83	~~90~~	14	108	111	~~119~~	9	194
13	Carissa Gordon (USA)	B	61.75	83	86	~~89~~	12	~~107~~	107	~~115~~	13	193
14	Masako Tokeshi (JPN)	B	62.03	78	~~82~~	82	15	102	~~106~~	106	14	188
15	Szilvia Nagy (HUN)	B	60.96	70	74	77	16	88	93	95	15	172
16	Rhariba Daamon (MAR)	B	62.39	50	55	~~60~~	17	60	66	71	16	126
—	Leila Lassouani (ALG)	A	62.56	~~86~~	86	~~89~~	13	~~117~~	~~117~~	~~117~~	—	—
DQ	Saipin Detsaeng (THA)	A	61.84	95	~~100~~	102	—	115	~~120~~	~~120~~	—	—

== New records ==
Snatch	116 kg	Pawina Thongsuk (THA)	WR
Clean & Jerk	139 kg	Svetlana Shimkova (RUS)	WR
Clean & Jerk	140 kg	Pawina Thongsuk (THA)	WR
Total	251 kg	Pawina Thongsuk (THA)	WR
Total	256 kg	Pawina Thongsuk (THA)	WR
