= Weightlifting at the 1998 Asian Games – Women's 69 kg =

Women's 69 kg at the 1998 Asian Games
- Venue: Thunder Dome
- Date: 11 December 1998
- Competitors: 7 from 7 nations

Medalists
gold medal	Sun Tianni	China
silver medal	Win Win Maw	Myanmar
bronze medal	Wu Mei-yi	Chinese Taipei

The women's 69 kilograms event at the 1998 Asian Games took place on 11 December 1998 at Thunder Dome, Maung Thong Thani Sports Complex.

The weightlifter from China won the gold, with a combined lift of 245 kg.

Total score was the sum of the lifter's best result in each of the snatch and the clean and jerk, with three lifts allowed for each lift. In case of a tie, the lighter lifter won; if still tied, the lifter who took the fewest attempts to achieve the total score won. Lifters without a valid snatch score were allowed to perform the clean and jerk.

== Results ==
Legend

- NM — No mark

Rank	Athlete	Body weight	Snatch (kg)				Clean & Jerk (kg)				Total
Rank	Athlete	Body weight	1	2	3	Result	1	2	3	Result	Total
1st place, gold medalist(s)	Sun Tianni (CHN)	66.40	102.5	105.0	111.0	110.0	130.0	135.0	—	135.0	245.0
2nd place, silver medalist(s)	Win Win Maw (MYA)	67.95	95.0	97.5	~~100.0~~	97.5	127.5	~~130.0~~	130.0	130.0	227.5
3rd place, bronze medalist(s)	Wu Mei-yi (TPE)	67.85	~~97.5~~	97.5	~~102.5~~	97.5	125.0	127.5	~~130.0~~	127.5	225.0
4	Kang Mi-suk (KOR)	68.95	~~90.0~~	90.0	~~97.5~~	90.0	112.5	~~122.5~~	~~122.5~~	112.5	202.5
5	Kumi Haseba (JPN)	68.65	80.0	~~85.0~~	85.0	85.0	100.0	105.0	~~110.0~~	105.0	190.0
—	Pawina Thongsuk (THA)	65.10	95.0	~~100.0~~	~~100.0~~	95.0	~~125.0~~	~~125.0~~	~~125.0~~	—	NM
—	Jon Myong-hui (PRK)	68.15	~~95.0~~	~~95.0~~	~~95.0~~	—	~~120.0~~	~~120.0~~	120.0	120.0	NM

== New records ==
The following records were established during the competition.

Snatch	111.0	Sun Tianni (CHN)	WR
Clean & Jerk	135.0	Sun Tianni (CHN)	WR
Total	245.0	Sun Tianni (CHN)	WR
