= 2006 World Weightlifting Championships – Women's 48 kg =

The 2006 World Weightlifting Championships were held in Santo Domingo, Dominican Republic from 30 September to 7 October. The women's 48 kilograms division was staged on 1 October 2006.

== Schedule ==
Date	Time	Event
1 October 2006	12:00	Group B
1 October 2006	16:00	Group A

== Medalists ==
Event	Gold		Silver		Bronze	
Snatch	Yang Lian (CHN)	98 kg	Aree Wiratthaworn (THA)	85 kg	Svetlana Ulyanova (RUS)	83 kg
Clean & Jerk	Yang Lian (CHN)	119 kg	Hiromi Miyake (JPN)	108 kg	Svetlana Ulyanova (RUS)	105 kg
Total	Yang Lian (CHN)	217 kg	Aree Wiratthaworn (THA)	188 kg	Hiromi Miyake (JPN)	188 kg

== Records ==
Prior to this competition, the existing world records were as follows.

World Record	Snatch	Nurcan Taylan (TUR)	97 kg	Athens, Greece	14 August 2004
World Record	Clean & Jerk	Wang Mingjuan (CHN)	118 kg	Doha, Qatar	9 November 2005
World Record	Total	Wang Mingjuan (CHN)	213 kg	Doha, Qatar	9 November 2005

== Results ==
Rank	Athlete	Group	Body weight	Snatch (kg)				Clean & Jerk (kg)				Total
Rank	Athlete	Group	Body weight	1	2	3	Rank	1	2	3	Rank	Total
1st place, gold medalist(s)	Yang Lian (CHN)	A	47.80	90	95	98	1st place, gold medalist(s)	110	116	119	1st place, gold medalist(s)	217
2nd place, silver medalist(s)	Aree Wiratthaworn (THA)	A	47.52	80	85	~~87~~	2nd place, silver medalist(s)	103	~~108~~	~~108~~	5	188
3rd place, bronze medalist(s)	Hiromi Miyake (JPN)	A	47.63	78	80	~~82~~	6	105	108	~~110~~	2nd place, silver medalist(s)	188
4	Svetlana Ulyanova (RUS)	A	47.73	80	83	~~85~~	3rd place, bronze medalist(s)	~~101~~	101	105	3rd place, bronze medalist(s)	188
5	Estefanía Juan (ESP)	A	47.77	~~82~~	~~82~~	82	4	102	104	~~107~~	4	186
6	Thipamon Phupruem (THA)	A	47.30	72	77	~~80~~	7	95	100	102	6	179
7	Genny Pagliaro (ITA)	A	47.84	78	82	~~84~~	5	95	~~100~~	~~100~~	9	177
8	Nguyễn Bích Hà (VIE)	A	47.65	75	~~81~~	~~81~~	8	93	96	~~101~~	7	171
9	Mélanie Noël (FRA)	A	47.79	70	72	74	10	91	94	96	8	170
10	Shoko Sumida (JPN)	A	47.74	73	75	~~78~~	9	~~92~~	92	~~95~~	10	167
11	Carolina Valencia (MEX)	B	47.97	73	~~78~~	~~78~~	12	92	~~96~~	~~96~~	11	165
12	Olga Navotna (UKR)	B	47.64	70	~~73~~	73	11	85	88	91	12	164
13	Chen Wei-ling (TPE)	B	45.63	67	70	~~71~~	13	82	87	90	13	160
14	Lely Burgos (PUR)	B	47.62	67	70	~~72~~	14	85	90	~~92~~	14	160
15	Marta Kleszczyńska (POL)	B	47.85	68	70	~~72~~	15	88	90	~~91~~	15	160
16	Guillermina Candelario (DOM)	B	47.98	~~67~~	67	70	16	86	~~91~~	~~92~~	17	156
17	Lazzat Kashkulina (KAZ)	B	47.93	63	67	~~70~~	17	82	~~87~~	87	16	154
18	Sevginar Topalova (BUL)	B	47.96	62	~~66~~	~~66~~	19	83	~~85~~	85	18	147
19	Giovanna D'Alessandro (ITA)	B	46.59	60	64	~~66~~	18	75	~~81~~	81	19	145
20	Tímea Kovács (HUN)	B	47.62	~~56~~	56	~~60~~	20	72	75	~~77~~	20	131
—	Silviya Angelova (BUL)	B	47.48	~~68~~	~~68~~	~~68~~	—	—	—	—	—	—

== New records ==
Snatch	98 kg	Yang Lian (CHN)	WR
Clean & Jerk	119 kg	Yang Lian (CHN)	WR
Total	214 kg	Yang Lian (CHN)	WR
Total	217 kg	Yang Lian (CHN)	WR
