= Weightlifting at the 1998 Asian Games – Women's +75 kg =

Event at the 1998 Asian Games

Women's +75 kg at the 1998 Asian Games
- Venue: Thunder Dome
- Date: 13 December 1998
- Competitors: 6 from 5 nations

Medalists
gold medal	Ding Meiyuan	China
silver medal	Aye Aye Aung	Myanmar
bronze medal	Chen Hsiao-lien	Chinese Taipei

The women's +75 kilograms event at the 1998 Asian Games took place on 13 December 1998 at Thunder Dome, Maung Thong Thani Sports Complex.

The weightlifter from China won the gold, with a combined lift of 270 kg.

Total score was the sum of the lifter's best result in each of the snatch and the clean and jerk, with three lifts allowed for each lift. In case of a tie, the lighter lifter won; if still tied, the lifter who took the fewest attempts to achieve the total score won. Lifters without a valid snatch score were allowed to perform the clean and jerk.

== Results ==
Rank	Athlete	Body weight	Snatch (kg)				Clean & Jerk (kg)				Total
Rank	Athlete	Body weight	1	2	3	Result	1	2	3	Result	Total
1st place, gold medalist(s)	Ding Meiyuan (CHN)	90.90	112.5	117.5	120.0	120.0	142.5	150.0	~~156.0~~	150.0	270.0
2nd place, silver medalist(s)	Aye Aye Aung (MYA)	113.45	110.0	115.0	~~117.5~~	115.0	132.5	137.5	~~140.0~~	137.5	252.5
3rd place, bronze medalist(s)	Chen Hsiao-lien (TPE)	98.35	100.0	105.0	~~107.5~~	105.0	137.5	~~147.5~~	~~147.5~~	137.5	242.5
4	Cheng Chia-yi (TPE)	104.35	102.5	105.0	107.5	107.5	~~135.0~~	135.0	~~140.0~~	135.0	242.5
5	Miyuki Arai (JPN)	86.80	90.0	~~95.0~~	95.0	95.0	115.0	120.0	125.0	125.0	220.0
6	Moon Kyung-ae (KOR)	88.85	87.5	92.5	~~97.5~~	92.5	120.0	125.0	~~130.0~~	125.0	217.5

== New records ==
The following records were established during the competition.

Clean & Jerk	120.0	Ding Meiyuan (CHN)	WR
Total	270.0	Ding Meiyuan (CHN)	WR
