= Phaisan Hansawong =

Thai weightlifter

Phaisan Hansawong (Thai: ไพศาล หรรษาวงศ์, born October 21, 1989, in Buriram) is a Thai weightlifter.

At the 2007 World Championships he ranked 15th in the 56 kg category, with a total of 247 kg.

He competed in Weightlifting at the 2008 Summer Olympics in the 62 kg division finishing fifth, with 294 kg, beating his previous personal best by a considerable 47 kg.

He is 5 ft 5 inches tall and weighs 130 lb.
