= Weightlifting at the 1998 Asian Games – Men's 62 kg =

Men's 62 kg at the 1998 Asian Games
- Venue: Thunder Dome
- Date: 8 December 1998
- Competitors: 11 from 11 nations

Medalists
gold medal	Le Maosheng	China
silver medal	Dmitriy Lomakin	Kazakhstan
bronze medal	Hiroshi Ikehata	Japan

The men's 62 kilograms event at the 1998 Asian Games took place on 8 December 1998 at Thunder Dome, Maung Thong Thani Sports Complex.

The weightlifter from China won the gold, with a combined lift of 305 kg.

Total score was the sum of the lifter's best result in each of the snatch and the clean and jerk, with three lifts allowed for each lift. In case of a tie, the lighter lifter won; if still tied, the lifter who took the fewest attempts to achieve the total score won. Lifters without a valid snatch score were allowed to perform the clean and jerk.

== Results ==
Legend

- NM — No mark

Rank	Athlete	Body weight	Snatch (kg)				Clean & Jerk (kg)				Total
Rank	Athlete	Body weight	1	2	3	Result	1	2	3	Result	Total
1st place, gold medalist(s)	Le Maosheng (CHN)	61.95	135.0	140.0	~~142.5~~	140.0	165.0	~~180.5~~	~~180.5~~	165.0	305.0
2nd place, silver medalist(s)	Dmitriy Lomakin (KAZ)	61.70	125.0	130.0	~~132.5~~	130.0	152.5	157.5	~~160.0~~	157.5	287.5
3rd place, bronze medalist(s)	Hiroshi Ikehata (JPN)	61.75	125.0	127.5	~~130.0~~	127.5	157.5	160.0	~~162.5~~	160.0	287.5
4	Chom Singhnoi (THA)	61.45	125.0	~~127.5~~	~~127.5~~	125.0	152.5	160.0	~~162.5~~	160.0	285.0
5	Taufik (INA)	60.70	122.5	~~127.5~~	127.5	127.5	155.0	~~160.0~~	~~160.0~~	155.0	282.5
6	Ri Myong-chol (PRK)	61.75	122.5	~~125.0~~	~~125.0~~	122.5	~~160.0~~	160.0	~~167.5~~	160.0	282.5
7	Oussama Misto (LIB)	61.60	105.0	~~107.5~~	~~107.5~~	105.0	132.5	~~135.0~~	~~135.0~~	132.5	237.5
8	Roshan Nakarmi (NEP)	61.25	100.0	~~105.0~~	~~105.0~~	100.0	127.5	~~132.5~~	~~132.5~~	127.5	227.5
—	Mihail Şuwaýew (TKM)	60.65	107.5	112.5	~~115.0~~	112.5	—	—	—	—	NM
—	Hassan Ghassem (SYR)	61.50	~~115.0~~	~~115.0~~	~~115.0~~	—	~~135.0~~	135.0	~~140.0~~	135.0	NM
—	Chen Po-pu (TPE)	61.40	~~110.0~~	~~115.0~~	~~115.0~~	—	~~140.0~~	~~140.0~~	—	—	NM
