= Khassaraporn Suta =

Thai weightlifter (born 1971)

Personal information
- Born: 12 December 1971 (age 54) Ngao, Lampang, Thailand
Medal record
Women's Weightlifting
Representing Thailand
Olympic Games
Bronze medal – third place	2000 Sydney	– 58 kg
Asian Games
Bronze medal – third place	1998 Bangkok	– 58 kg

Khassaraporn Suta

Military service
- Allegiance: Thailand
- Branch/service: Royal Thai Navy
- Rank: Commander

Commander Khassaraporn Suta (Thai: เกษราภรณ์ สุตา; born December 12, 1971) is a Thai weightlifter who competed in the women's 58 kg at the 2000 Summer Olympics and won the bronze medal with a combined lift of 210.0 kg. She is the first Thai female Olympic medalist and the first Thai athlete to capture Olympic medal outside of boxing.
