= Khin Moe Nwe =

Burmese weightlifter

Personal information
- Full name: Khin Moe Nwe
- Born: 1 January 1973 (age 53)
- Height: 157 cm (5 ft 2 in)
- Weight: 57.20 kg (126.1 lb)

Sport
- Country: Myanmar
- Sport: Weightlifting
- Weight class: 58 kg
- Team: National team
- Updated on 28 September 2016

Khin Moe Nwe (born 1 January 1973) is a Burmese weightlifter, competing in the 58 kg category and representing Myanmar at international competitions.

She participated at the 2000 Summer Olympics in the 58 kg event. She competed at world championships, most recently at the 1999 World Weightlifting Championships.

== Major results ==
| Year | Venue | Weight | Snatch (kg) | | | | Clean & Jerk (kg) | | | | Total | Rank |
| Year | Venue | Weight | 1 | 2 | 3 | Rank | 1 | 2 | 3 | Rank | Total | Rank |
Summer Olympics
| 2000 | Sydney, Australia | 58 kg | | | | —N/a | | | | —N/a | | 6 |
World Championships
| 1999 | Piraeus, Greece | 58 kg | 87.5 | 90 | ~~92.5~~ | 6 | ~~110~~ | 110 | ~~115~~ | 8 | 200 | 7 |
