= Mya Sanda Oo =

Burmese weightlifter

Personal information
- Born: 26 December 1976 (age 49)
- Weight: 63.45 kg (139.9 lb)

Sport
- Country: Myanmar
- Sport: Weightlifting
- Weight class: 64 kg
- Team: National team
- Updated on 4 October 2016

Mya Sanda Oo (born 26 December 1976) is a Burmese female former weightlifter, competing in the 64 kg category and representing Myanmar at international competitions. She competed at world championships, most recently at the 1997 World Weightlifting Championships.

She won the bronze medal at the 2002 Asian Games. At the 2006 Asian Games she won the silver medal but was disqualified after she was caught for using the forbidden substance Metabolite.

== Major results ==
Year	Venue	Weight	Snatch (kg)				Clean & Jerk (kg)				Total	Rank
Year	Venue	Weight	1	2	3	Rank	1	2	3	Rank	Total	Rank
World Championships
1997	Chiang Mai, Thailand	64 kg	90.0	~~95.0~~	~~95.0~~	10	~~120.0~~	~~120.0~~	~~120.0~~	—	—	—
