= Yang Lian (weightlifter) =

Chinese weightlifter (born 1982)

Personal information
- Nationality: China
- Born: 16 October 1982 (age 43)
- Weight: 48 kg (106 lb)

Sport
- Country: China
- Sport: Weightlifting
- Event: 48 kg

Achievements and titles
- Personal bests: Snatch: 98 kg (2006, WR); Clean and jerk: 119 kg (2006); Total: 217 kg (2006, WR)
Medal record
Women's weightlifting
Representing China
World Championships
Gold medal – first place	2006 Santo Domingo	– 48 kg
East Asian Games
Gold medal – first place	2005 Macau	– 48 kg
Gold medal – first place	2009 Hong Kong	– 48 kg
National Games of China
Gold medal – first place	2005 Jiangsu	– 48 kg
Silver medal – second place	2009 Shandong	– 48 kg

Yang Lian (Chinese: 杨炼, born 16 October 1982) is a Chinese weightlifter.

Yang participated in the women's 48 kg class at the 2006 World Weightlifting Championships and won the gold medal, snatching 98 kg and clean and jerking an additional 119 kg for a total of 217 kg. Both being world records and a world record for the total.
