= Saipin Detsaeng =

Thai weightlifter

Personal information
- Full name: Saipin Datsaeng
- Born: 15 March 1977 (age 49)
- Weight: 61.84 kg (136.3 lb)

Sport
- Country: Thailand
- Sport: Weightlifting
- Weight class: 63 kg
- Team: National team
- Updated on 13 September 2016

Saipin Datsaeng (born 15 March 1977) is a Thai weightlifter, competing in the 63 kg category and representing Thailand at international competitions. Among her achievements is a fourth place at the 2000 Summer Olympics in Sydney. She competed at world championships, most recently at the 2005 World Weightlifting Championships.

== Major results ==
| Year | Venue | Weight | Snatch (kg) | | | | Clean & Jerk (kg) | | | | Total | Rank |
| Year | Venue | Weight | 1 | 2 | 3 | Rank | 1 | 2 | 3 | Rank | Total | Rank |
World Championships
| 2005 | Doha, Qatar | 63 kg | 95 | ~~100~~ | 102 | --- | 115 | ~~120~~ | ~~120~~ | --- | 0.0 | --- |
| 1999 | Piraeus, Greece | 63 kg | ~~95~~ | 95 | ~~102.5~~ | 6 | 120 | ~~125~~ | ~~127.5~~ | 7 | 215 | 6 |
