= Yang Xia =

Chinese weightlifter (born 1977)

Personal information
- Born: January 8, 1977 (age 49)
Medal record
Women's Weightlifting
Representing China
Olympic Games
Gold medal – first place	2000 Sydney	– 53 kg
Asian Games
Gold medal – first place	1998 Bangkok	– 53 kg

Yang Xia (Chinese: 杨霞; born January 8, 1977, in Hunan) is a female Chinese weightlifter. She currently studies journalism at Hunan Normal University.

== Major performances ==
- 1993 National Games - 1st
- 1996 National Championships - 5th 59 kg
- 1998 Bangkok Asian Games - 1st 53 kg
- 2000 Sydney Olympic Games - 1st 53 kg total
- 2001 National Games - 1st 53 kg
