= List of world records in Olympic weightlifting =

Pictogram

This is a list of world records in Olympic weightlifting. These records are maintained in each weight class for the snatch lift, clean and jerk lift, and the total for both lifts.

The International Weightlifting Federation (IWF) restructured its weight classes in 1993, 1998, 2018, 2025 and 2026 nullifying earlier records.

== Current records ==
Key to tables: Awaiting ratification Not ratified or later rescinded by IWF

When the previous records and weight classes were discarded, the IWF defined "world standards" as the minimum lifts needed to qualify as world records in the new weight classes. Wherever World Standard appears in the list below, no qualified weightlifter has yet lifted these weights in a sanctioned competition.

=== Men ===
Event	Record	Athlete	Nation	Date	Meet	Place	Ref
60 kg
Snatch	141 kg	World Standard					
Clean & Jerk	174 kg	Pang Un-chol	North Korea	11 May 2026	Asian Championships	Gandhinagar, India	
Total	307 kg	World Standard					
65 kg
Snatch	152 kg	He Yueji	China	24 September 2026	Asian Games	Nagoya, Japan	
Clean & Jerk	187 kg	Pak Myong-jin	North Korea	28 October 2026	World Championships	Ningbo, China	
Total	331 kg	Pak Myong-jin	North Korea	28 October 2026	World Championships	Ningbo, China	
70 kg
Snatch	157 kg	Pak Pyol	North Korea	30 October 2026	World Championships	Ningbo, China	
Clean & Jerk	198 kg	Ri Won-ju	North Korea	26 September 2026	Asian Games	Nagoya, Japan	
Total	355 kg	Pak Pyol	North Korea	30 October 2026	World Championships	Ningbo, China	
75 kg
Snatch	162 kg	Ri Chong-song	North Korea	26 September 2026	Asian Games	Nagoya, Japan	
Clean & Jerk	206 kg	Rahmat Erwin Abdullah	Indonesia	26 September 2026	Asian Games	Nagoya, Japan	
Total	366 kg	Rahmat Erwin Abdullah	Indonesia	26 September 2026	Asian Games	Nagoya, Japan	
85 kg
Snatch	178 kg	Yeison López	Colombia	2 November 2026	World Championships	Ningbo, China	
Clean & Jerk	215 kg	Ro Kwang-ryol	North Korea	2 November 2026	World Championships	Ningbo, China	
Total	390 kg	Abdelrahman Younes	Egypt	2 November 2026	World Championships	Ningbo, China	
95 kg
Snatch	185 kg	Karlos Nasar	Bulgaria	4 November 2026	World Championships	Ningbo, China	
Clean & Jerk	230 kg	Karlos Nasar	Bulgaria	4 November 2026	World Championships	Ningbo, China	
Total	415 kg	Karlos Nasar	Bulgaria	4 November 2026	World Championships	Ningbo, China	
110 kg
Snatch	198 kg	Akbar Djuraev	Uzbekistan	6 November 2026	World Championships	Ningbo, China	
Clean & Jerk	237 kg	World Standard					
Total	432 kg	Akbar Djuraev	Uzbekistan	6 November 2026	World Championships	Ningbo, China	
+110 kg
Snatch	219 kg	Ali Ammar	Iraq	29 September 2026	Asian Games	Nagoya, Japan	
Clean & Jerk	263 kg	Alireza Yousefi	Iran	8 November 2026	World Championships	Ningbo, China	
Total	477 kg	World Standard					

=== Women ===
Event	Record	Athlete	Nation	Date	Meet	Place	Ref
49 kg
Snatch	94 kg	Ri Song-gum	North Korea	23 September 2026	Asian Games	Nagoya, Japan	
Clean & Jerk	121 kg	Ri Song-gum	North Korea	23 September 2026	Asian Games	Nagoya, Japan	
Total	215 kg	Ri Song-gum	North Korea	23 September 2026	Asian Games	Nagoya, Japan	
53 kg
Snatch	99 kg	World Standard					
Clean & Jerk	126 kg	World Standard					
Total	223 kg	World Standard					
57 kg
Snatch	104 kg	Oh Kwang-ok	North Korea	25 September 2026	Asian Games	Nagoya, Japan	
Clean & Jerk	134 kg	Oh Kwang-ok	North Korea	25 September 2026	Asian Games	Nagoya, Japan	
Total	238 kg	Oh Kwang-ok	North Korea	25 September 2026	Asian Games	Nagoya, Japan	
61 kg
Snatch	112 kg	Yang Liuyue	China	25 September 2026	Asian Games	Nagoya, Japan	
Clean & Jerk	142 kg	Pei Xinyi	China	1 November 2026	World Championships	Ningbo, China	
Total	254 kg	Pei Xinyi	China	1 November 2026	World Championships	Ningbo, China	
69 kg
Snatch	122 kg	Song Kuk-hyang	North Korea	3 November 2026	World Championships	Ningbo, China	
Clean & Jerk	153 kg	Song Kuk-hyang	North Korea	3 November 2026	World Championships	Ningbo, China	
Total	275 kg	Song Kuk-hyang	North Korea	3 November 2026	World Championships	Ningbo, China	
77 kg
Snatch	126 kg	Peng Cuiting	China	5 November 2026	World Championships	Ningbo, China	
Clean & Jerk	155 kg	Olivia Reeves	United States	8 October 2025	World Championships	Førde, Norway	
Total	278 kg	Olivia Reeves	United States	8 October 2025	World Championships	Førde, Norway	
86 kg
Snatch	129 kg	World Standard					
Clean & Jerk	163 kg	Liao Guifang	China	7 November 2026	World Championships	Ningbo, China	
Total	291 kg	Liao Guifang	China	7 November 2026	World Championships	Ningbo, China	
+86 kg
Snatch	147 kg	Li Yan	China	8 November 2026	World Championships	Ningbo, China	
Clean & Jerk	181 kg	World Standard					
Total	325 kg	World Standard					

== Historical records ==
=== Men (2025–2026) ===
Event	Record	Athlete	Nation	Date	Meet	Place	Ref
71 kg
Snatch	160 kg	He Yueji	China	5 October 2025	World Championships	Førde, Norway	
Clean & Jerk	197 kg	Ri Won-ju	North Korea	14 May 2026	Asian Championships	Gandhinagar, India	
Total	351 kg	Ri Won-ju	North Korea	14 May 2026	Asian Championships	Gandhinagar, India	
79 kg
Snatch	166 kg	Abdelrahman Younes	Egypt	10 November 2025	Islamic Solidarity Games	Riyadh, Saudi Arabia	
Clean & Jerk	206 kg	Ri Ryong-hyon	North Korea	14 May 2026	Asian Championships	Gandhinagar, India	
Total	365 kg	Rizki Juniansyah	Indonesia	15 December 2025	SEA Games	Chonburi, Thailand	
88 kg
Snatch	182 kg	Abdelrahman Younes	Egypt	15 May 2026	African Championships	Ismailia, Egypt	
Clean & Jerk	220 kg	Ro Kwang-ryol	North Korea	15 May 2026	Asian Championships	Gandhinagar, India	
Total	397 kg	Yeison López	Colombia	29 April 2026	Pan American Championships	Panama City, Panama	
94 kg
Snatch	185 kg	Karlos Nasar	Bulgaria	4 November 2026	World Championships	Førde, Norway	
Clean & Jerk	230 kg	Karlos Nasar	Bulgaria	4 November 2026	World Championships	Førde, Norway	
Total	415 kg	Karlos Nasar	Bulgaria				

=== Men (2018–2025) ===
Event	Record	Athlete	Nation	Date	Meet	Place	Ref
55 kg
Snatch	135 kg	World Standard					
Clean & Jerk	166 kg	Om Yun-chol	North Korea	18 September 2019	World Championships	Pattaya, Thailand	
Total	294 kg	Om Yun-chol	North Korea	18 September 2019	World Championships	Pattaya, Thailand	
61 kg
Snatch	146 kg	Li Fabin	China	2 April 2024	World Cup	Phuket, Thailand	
Clean & Jerk	176 kg	Hampton Morris	United States	2 April 2024	World Cup	Phuket, Thailand	
Total	318 kg	Li Fabin	China	19 September 2019	World Championships	Pattaya, Thailand	
67 kg
Snatch	155 kg	Huang Minhao	China	6 July 2019	Olympics Test Event	Tokyo, Japan	
Clean & Jerk	190 kg	Ri Won-ju	North Korea	8 December 2024	World Championships	Manama, Bahrain	
Total	339 kg	Chen Lijun	China	21 April 2019	Asian Championships	Ningbo, China	
73 kg
Snatch	169 kg	Shi Zhiyong	China	20 April 2021	Asian Championships	Tashkent, Uzbekistan	
Clean & Jerk	205 kg	Rahmat Erwin Abdullah	Indonesia	11 May 2025	Asian Championships	Jiangshan, China	
Total	365 kg	Rizki Juniansyah	Indonesia	4 April 2024	World Cup	Phuket, Thailand	
81 kg
Snatch	175 kg	Li Dayin	China	21 April 2021	Asian Championships	Tashkent, Uzbekistan	
Clean & Jerk	209 kg	Rahmat Erwin Abdullah	Indonesia	11 September 2023	World Championships	Riyadh, Saudi Arabia	
Total	378 kg	Lü Xiaojun	China	22 September 2019	World Championships	Pattaya, Thailand	
89 kg
Snatch	183 kg	Karlos Nasar	Bulgaria	11 December 2024	World Championships	Manama, Bahrain	
Clean & Jerk	224 kg	Karlos Nasar	Bulgaria	9 August 2024	Olympic Games	Paris, France	
Total	405 kg	Karlos Nasar	Bulgaria	11 December 2024	World Championships	Manama, Bahrain	
96 kg
Snatch	188 kg	Karlos Nasar	Bulgaria	19 April 2025	European Championships	Chișinău, Moldova	
Clean & Jerk	231 kg	Tian Tao	China	7 July 2019	Olympics Test Event	Tokyo, Japan	
Total	417 kg	Karlos Nasar	Bulgaria	19 April 2025	European Championships	Chișinău, Moldova	
102 kg
Snatch	191 kg	World Standard					
Clean & Jerk	232 kg	Liu Huanhua	China	8 April 2024	World Cup	Phuket, Thailand	
Total	413 kg	Liu Huanhua	China	8 April 2024	World Cup	Phuket, Thailand	
109 kg
Snatch	200 kg	Yang Zhe	China	24 April 2021	Asian Championships	Tashkent, Uzbekistan	
Clean & Jerk	242 kg	Ruslan Nurudinov	Uzbekistan	14 December 2024	World Championships	Manama, Bahrain	
Total	435 kg	Simon Martirosyan	Armenia	9 November 2018	World Championships	Ashgabat, Turkmenistan	
+109 kg
Snatch	225 kg	Lasha Talakhadze	Georgia	17 December 2021	World Championships	Tashkent, Uzbekistan	
Clean & Jerk	267 kg	Lasha Talakhadze	Georgia	17 December 2021	World Championships	Tashkent, Uzbekistan	
Total	492 kg	Lasha Talakhadze	Georgia	17 December 2021	World Championships	Tashkent, Uzbekistan	

=== Men (1998–2018) ===
Event	Record	Athlete	Nation	Date	Meet	Place	Ref
56 kg
Snatch	139 kg	Wu Jingbiao	China	21 November 2015	World Championships	Houston, United States	
Clean & Jerk	171 kg	Om Yun-chol	North Korea	21 November 2015	World Championships	Houston, United States	
Total	307 kg	Long Qingquan	China	7 August 2016	Olympic Games	Rio de Janeiro, Brazil	
62 kg
Snatch	154 kg	Kim Un-guk	North Korea	21 September 2014	Asian Games	Incheon, South Korea	
Clean & Jerk	183 kg	Chen Lijun	China	22 November 2015	World Championships	Houston, United States	
Total	333 kg	Chen Lijun	China	22 November 2015	World Championships	Houston, United States	
69 kg
Snatch	166 kg	Liao Hui	China	10 November 2014	World Championships	Almaty, Kazakhstan	
Clean & Jerk	198 kg	Liao Hui	China	23 October 2013	World Championships	Wrocław, Poland	
Total	359 kg	Liao Hui	China	10 November 2014	World Championships	Almaty, Kazakhstan	
77 kg
Snatch	177 kg	Lü Xiaojun	China	10 August 2016	Olympic Games	Rio de Janeiro, Brazil	
Clean & Jerk	210 kg	Oleg Perepetchenov^{1}	Russia	27 April 2001	European Championships	Trenčín, Slovakia	
Total	380 kg	Lü Xiaojun	China	24 October 2013	World Championships	Wrocław, Poland	
85 kg
Snatch	187 kg	Andrei Rybakou	Belarus	22 September 2007	World Championships	Chiang Mai, Thailand	
Clean & Jerk	220 kg	Kianoush Rostami	Iran	31 May 2016	Fajr Cup	Tehran, Iran	
Total	396 kg	Kianoush Rostami	Iran	12 August 2016	Olympic Games	Rio de Janeiro, Brazil	
94 kg
Snatch	189 kg	Sohrab Moradi	Iran	25 August 2018	Asian Games	Jakarta, Indonesia	
Clean & Jerk	233 kg	Sohrab Moradi	Iran	3 December 2017	World Championships	Anaheim, United States	
Total	417 kg	Sohrab Moradi	Iran	3 December 2017	World Championships	Anaheim, United States	
105 kg
Snatch	200 kg	Andrei Aramnau	Belarus	18 August 2008	Olympic Games	Beijing, China	
Clean & Jerk	246 kg	Ilya Ilyin	Kazakhstan	12 December 2015	President's Cup	Grozny, Russia	
Total	437 kg	Ilya Ilyin	Kazakhstan	12 December 2015	President's Cup	Grozny, Russia	
+105 kg
Snatch	220 kg	Lasha Talakhadze	Georgia	5 December 2017	World Championships	Anaheim, United States	
Clean & Jerk	263 kg	Hossein Rezazadeh	Iran	25 August 2004	Olympic Games	Piraeus, Greece	
Total	477 kg	Lasha Talakhadze	Georgia	5 December 2017	World Championships	Anaheim, United States	

^1 The IWF website still lists Nijat Rahimov (Kazakhstan) record of 214 kg in the clean and jerk, which was later disqualified for doping.

=== Men (1993–1997) ===
Event	Record	Athlete	Nation	Date	Meet	Place	Ref
54 kg
Snatch	132.5 kg	Halil Mutlu	Turkey	20 July 1996	Olympic Games	Atlanta, United States	
Clean & Jerk	160.5 kg	Lan Shizhang	China	6 December 1997	World Championships	Chiang Mai, Thailand	
Total	290.0 kg	Halil Mutlu	Turkey	18 November 1994	World Championships	Istanbul, Turkey	
59 kg
Snatch	140.0 kg	Hafız Süleymanoğlu	Turkey	3 May 1995	European Championships	Warsaw, Poland	
Clean & Jerk	170.0 kg	Nikolay Peshalov	Bulgaria	3 May 1995	European Championships	Warsaw, Poland	
Total	307.5 kg	Tang Lingsheng	China	21 July 1996	Olympic Games	Atlanta, United States	
64 kg
Snatch	150.0 kg	Wang Guohua	China	12 May 1997	East Asian Games	Busan, South Korea	
Clean & Jerk	187.5 kg	Valerios Leonidis	Greece	22 July 1996	Olympic Games	Atlanta, United States	
Total	335.0 kg	Naim Süleymanoğlu	Turkey	22 July 1996	Olympic Games	Atlanta, United States	
70 kg
Snatch	163.0 kg	Wan Jianhui	China	9 July 1997	Asian Championships	Yangzhou, China	
Clean & Jerk	195.5 kg	Zhan Xugang	China	9 December 1997	World Championships	Chiang Mai, Thailand	
Total	357.5 kg	Zhan Xugang	China	23 July 1996	Olympic Games	Atlanta, United States	
76 kg
Snatch	170.0 kg	Ruslan Savchenko	Ukraine	16 November 1993	World Championships	Melbourne, Australia	
Clean & Jerk	208.0 kg	Pablo Lara	Cuba	20 April 1996	Szekszárd Cup	Szekszárd, Hungary	
Total	372.5 kg	Pablo Lara	Cuba	20 April 1996	Szekszárd Cup	Szekszárd, Hungary	
83 kg
Snatch	180.0 kg	Pyrros Dimas	Greece	26 July 1996	Olympic Games	Atlanta, United States	
Clean & Jerk	214.0 kg	Zhang Yong	China	12 July 1997	Asian Championships	Yangzhou, China	
Total	393 kg	Pyrros Dimas	Greece	26 July 1996	Olympic Games	Atlanta, United States	
91 kg
Snatch	187.5 kg	Aleksey Petrov	Russia	26 July 1996	Olympic Games	Atlanta, United States	
Clean & Jerk	228.5 kg	Akakios Kakiasvilis	Greece	6 May 1995	European Championships	Warsaw, Poland	
Total	412.5 kg	Aleksey Petrov	Russia	7 May 1994	European Championships	Sokolov, Czech Republic	
99 kg
Snatch	192.5 kg	Sergey Syrtsov	Russia	25 November 1994	World Championships	Istanbul, Turkey	
Clean & Jerk	235.0 kg	Akakios Kakiasvilis	Greece	28 July 1996	Olympic Games	Atlanta, United States	
Total	420.0 kg	Akakios Kakiasvilis	Greece	28 July 1996	Olympic Games	Atlanta, United States	
108 kg
Snatch	200.0 kg	Timur Taymazov	Ukraine	26 November 1994	World Championships	Istanbul, Turkey	
Clean & Jerk	236.0 kg	Timur Taymazov	Ukraine	29 July 1996	Olympic Games	Atlanta, United States	
Total	435.0 kg	Timur Taymazov	Ukraine	26 November 1994	World Championships	Istanbul, Turkey	
+108 kg
Snatch	205.0 kg	Aleksandr Kurlovich	Belarus	27 November 1994	World Championships	Istanbul, Turkey	
Clean & Jerk	262.5 kg	Andrey Chemerkin	Russia	14 December 1997	World Championships	Chiang Mai, Thailand	
Total	462.5 kg	Andrey Chemerkin	Russia	14 December 1997	World Championships	Chiang Mai, Thailand	

=== Men (1973–1992) ===
Event	Record	Athlete	Nation	Date	Meet	Place	Ref
52 kg
Snatch	121.0 kg	He Zhuoqiang	China	29 May 1992	Silver Dragon Tournament	Cardiff, United Kingdom	
Clean & Jerk	155.5 kg	Ivan Ivanov	Bulgaria	27 September 1991	World Championships	Donaueschingen, Germany	
Total	272.5 kg	Ivan Ivanov	Bulgaria	16 September 1989	World Championships	Piraeus, Greece	
56 kg
Snatch	135.0 kg	Liu Shoubin	China	28 September 1991	World Championships	Donaueschingen, Germany	
Clean & Jerk	171.0 kg	Neno Terziyski	Bulgaria	6 September 1987	World Championships	Ostrava, Czechoslovakia	
Total	300.0 kg	Naim Suleymanov	Bulgaria	11 May 1984		Varna, Bulgaria	
60 kg
Snatch	152.5 kg	Naim Süleymanoğlu	Turkey	20 September 1988	Olympic Games	Seoul, South Korea	
Clean & Jerk	190.0 kg	Naim Süleymanoğlu	Turkey	20 September 1988	Olympic Games	Seoul, South Korea	
Total	342.5 kg	Naim Süleymanoğlu	Turkey	20 September 1988	Olympic Games	Seoul, South Korea	
67.5 kg
Snatch	160.0 kg	Israel Militosyan	Soviet Union	16 September 1989	World Championships	Piraeus, Greece	
Clean & Jerk	200.5 kg	Mikhail Petrov	Bulgaria	8 September 1987	World Championships	Ostrava, Czechoslovakia	
Total	355.0 kg	Mikhail Petrov	Bulgaria	5 May 1987	World Cup	Seoul, South Korea	
75 kg
Snatch	170.0 kg	Angel Genchev	Bulgaria	12 November 1987	European Cup Gala	Miskolc, Hungary	
Clean & Jerk	215.5 kg	Aleksandar Varbanov	Bulgaria	12 May 1987	World Cup	Seoul, South Korea	
Total	382.5 kg	Aleksandar Varbanov	Bulgaria	20 February 1988	World Cup	Plovdiv, Bulgaria	
82.5 kg
Snatch	183.0 kg	Asen Zlatev	Bulgaria	7 December 1986	World Cup	Melbourne, Australia	
Clean & Jerk	225.0 kg	Asen Zlatev	Bulgaria	12 November 1986	World Championships	Sofia, Bulgaria	
Total	405.0 kg	Yurik Vardanyan	Soviet Union	14 September 1984	Friendship Games	Varna, Bulgaria	
90 kg
Snatch	195.5 kg	Blagoy Blagoev	Bulgaria	1 May 1983	World Cup	Varna, Bulgaria	
Clean & Jerk	235.0 kg	Anatoly Khrapaty	Soviet Union	29 April 1988	European Championships	Cardiff, United Kingdom	
Total	422.5 kg	Viktor Solodov	Soviet Union	15 September 1984	Friendship Games	Varna, Bulgaria	
100 kg
Snatch	200.5 kg	Nicu Vlad	Romania	14 November 1986	World Championships	Sofia, Bulgaria	
Clean & Jerk	242.5 kg	Aleksandr Popov	Soviet Union	5 March 1988	Friendship Cup	Tallinn, Soviet Union	
Total	440.0 kg	Yury Zakharevich	Soviet Union	4 March 1983	Friendship Cup	Odessa, Soviet Union	
110 kg
Snatch	210.0 kg	Yury Zakharevich	Soviet Union	27 September 1988	Olympic Games	Seoul, South Korea	
Clean & Jerk	250.5 kg	Yury Zakharevich	Soviet Union	30 April 1988	European Championships	Cardiff, United Kingdom	
Total	455.0 kg	Yury Zakharevich	Soviet Union	27 September 1988	Olympic Games	Seoul, South Korea	
+110 kg
Snatch	216.0 kg	Antonio Krastev	Bulgaria	13 September 1987	World Championships	Ostrava, Czechoslovakia	
Clean & Jerk	266.0 kg	Leonid Taranenko	Soviet Union	26 November 1988	Samboy Chips Cup	Canberra, Australia	
Total	476.0 kg	Leonid Taranenko	Soviet Union	26 November 1988	Samboy Chips Cup	Canberra, Australia	

=== Men (1920–1972) ===
Event	Record	Athlete	Nation	Date	Meet	Place	Ref
52 kg
Press	120.5 kg	Adam Gnatov	Soviet Union	11 July 1972	Baltic Cup	Riga, Soviet Union	
Snatch	105.0 kg	Aung Gyi	Burma	27 August 1972	Olympic Games	Munich, West Germany	
Clean & Jerk	132.5 kg	Charlie Depthios	Indonesia	27 August 1972	Olympic Games	Munich, West Germany	
Total	342.5 kg	Sándor Holczreiter	Hungary	12 September 1970	World Championships	Columbus, United States	
56 kg
Press	128.5 kg	Mohammad Nassiri	Iran	10 July 1972		Tehran, Iran	
Snatch	115.0 kg	Koji Miki	Japan	23 October 1972		Kagoshima, Japan	
Clean & Jerk	150.0 kg	Mohammad Nassiri	Iran	13 October 1968	Olympic Games	Mexico City, Mexico	
Total	377.5 kg	Imre Földi	Hungary	28 August 1972	Olympic Games	Munich, West Germany	
60 kg
Press	137.5 kg	Imre Földi	Hungary	4 March 1972	Pre-Olympic Meet	Ulm, West Germany	
Snatch	125.5 kg	Yoshinobu Miyake	Japan	28 October 1969		Matsuura, Japan	
Clean & Jerk	157.5 kg	Norair Nurikyan	Bulgaria	29 August 1972	Olympic Games	Munich, West Germany	
Total	402.5 kg	Dito Shanidze	Soviet Union	12 April 1972	National Championships	Tallinn, Soviet Union	
67.5 kg
Press	157.5 kg	Mladen Kuchev	Bulgaria	30 August 1972	Olympic Games	Munich, West Germany	
Snatch	137.5 kg	Waldemar Baszanowski	Poland	23 April 1971	National Championships	Lublin, Poland	
Clean & Jerk	177.5 kg	Mukharby Kirzhinov	Soviet Union	30 August 1972	Olympic Games	Munich, West Germany	
Total	460.0 kg	Mukharby Kirzhinov	Soviet Union	30 August 1972	Olympic Games	Munich, West Germany	
75 kg
Press	166.5 kg	Aleksandr Kolodkov	Soviet Union	19 March 1972		Bollnäs, Sweden	
Snatch	147.5 kg	Mohamed Tarabulsi	Lebanon	11 November 1972		Beirut, Lebanon	
Clean & Jerk	187.5 kg	Viktor Kurentsov	Soviet Union	16 October 1968	Olympic Games	Mexico City, Mexico	
Total	485.0 kg	Yordan Bikov	Bulgaria	31 August 1972	Olympic Games	Munich, West Germany	
82.5 kg
Press	178.5 kg	Gennady Ivanchenko	Soviet Union	18 May 1972		Riga, Soviet Union	
Snatch	160.0 kg	David Rigert	Soviet Union	24 December 1972	USSR Cup	Sochi, Soviet Union	
Clean & Jerk	201.0 kg	David Rigert	Soviet Union	24 December 1972	USSR Cup	Sochi, Soviet Union	
Total	527.5 kg	Valery Shary	Soviet Union	14 May 1972		Moscow, Soviet Union	
90 kg
Press	198.0 kg	David Rigert	Soviet Union	13 July 1972	Baltic Cup	Riga, Soviet Union	
Snatch	167.5 kg	David Rigert	Soviet Union	13 July 1972	Baltic Cup	Riga, Soviet Union	
Clean & Jerk	210.5 kg	Vasily Kolotov	Soviet Union	13 July 1972	Baltic Cup	Riga, Soviet Union	
Total	562.5 kg	David Rigert	Soviet Union	13 July 1972	Baltic Cup	Riga, Soviet Union	
110 kg
Press	213.5 kg	Yury Kozin	Soviet Union	14 July 1972	Baltic Cup	Riga, Soviet Union	
Snatch	175.5 kg	Pavel Pervushin	Soviet Union	25 December 1972	USSR Cup	Sochi, Soviet Union	
Clean & Jerk	222.5 kg	Jaan Talts	Soviet Union	20 May 1972	European Championships	Constanța, Romania	
Total	590.0 kg	Valery Yakubovsky	Soviet Union	14 May 1972		Moscow, Soviet Union	
+110 kg
Press	236.5 kg	Vasily Alekseyev	Soviet Union	15 April 1972	National Championships	Tallinn, Soviet Union	
Snatch	180.0 kg	Vasily Alekseyev	Soviet Union	24 July 1971		Moscow, Soviet Union	
Clean & Jerk	237.5 kg	Vasily Alekseyev	Soviet Union	15 April 1972	National Championships	Tallinn, Soviet Union	
Total	645.0 kg	Vasily Alekseyev	Soviet Union	15 April 1972	National Championships	Tallinn, Soviet Union	

=== Women (2025–2026) ===
Event	Record	Athlete	Nation	Date	Meet	Place	Ref
48 kg
Snatch	93 kg	World Standard					
Clean & Jerk	122 kg	Ri Song-gum	North Korea	2 October 2025	World Championships	Førde, Norway	
Total	213 kg	Ri Song-gum	North Korea	2 October 2025	World Championships	Førde, Norway	
58 kg
Snatch	105 kg	World Standard					
Clean & Jerk	132 kg	World Standard					
Total	236 kg	Kim Il-gyong	North Korea	4 October 2025	World Championships	Førde, Norway	
63 kg
Snatch	112 kg	Yang Liuyue	China	14 May 2026	Asian Championships	Gandhinagar, India	
Clean & Jerk	143 kg	Ri Suk	North Korea	14 May 2026	Asian Championships	Gandhinagar, India	
Total	254 kg	Ri Suk	North Korea	14 May 2026	Asian Championships	Gandhinagar, India	

=== Women (2018–2025) ===
Event	Record	Athlete	Nation	Date	Meet	Place	Ref
45 kg
Snatch	90 kg	Zhao Jinhong	China	9 May 2025	Asian Championships	Jiangshan, China	
Clean & Jerk	113 kg	Zhao Jinhong	China	6 December 2024	World Championships	Manama, Bahrain	
Total	200 kg	Zhao Jinhong	China	6 December 2024	World Championships	Manama, Bahrain	
49 kg
Snatch	97 kg	Hou Zhihui	China	1 April 2024	World Cup	Phuket, Thailand	
Clean & Jerk	125 kg	Ri Song-gum	North Korea	4 February 2024	Asian Championships	Tashkent, Uzbekistan	
Total	221 kg	Ri Song-gum	North Korea	1 April 2024	World Cup	Phuket, Thailand	
55 kg
Snatch	104 kg	Kang Hyon-gyong	North Korea	4 February 2024	Asian Championships	Tashkent, Uzbekistan	
Clean & Jerk	131 kg	Kang Hyon-gyong	North Korea	2 April 2024	World Cup	Phuket, Thailand	
Total	234 kg	Kang Hyon-gyong	North Korea	2 April 2024	World Cup	Phuket, Thailand	
59 kg
Snatch	111 kg	Kim Il-gyong	North Korea	2 October 2023	Asian Games	Hangzhou, China	
Clean & Jerk	141 kg	Kim Il-gyong	North Korea	9 December 2024	World Championships	Manama, Bahrain	
Total	249 kg	Kim Il-gyong	North Korea	9 December 2024	World Championships	Manama, Bahrain	
64 kg
Snatch	117 kg	Deng Wei	China	11 December 2019	World Cup	Tianjin, China	
Clean & Jerk	149 kg	Ri Suk	North Korea	10 December 2024	World Championships	Manama, Bahrain	
Total	264 kg	Ri Suk	North Korea	10 December 2024	World Championships	Manama, Bahrain	
71 kg
Snatch	122 kg	Yang Qiuxia	China	13 May 2025	Asian Championships	Jiangshan, China	
Clean & Jerk	155 kg	Song Kuk-hyang	North Korea	13 May 2025	Asian Championships	Jiangshan, China	
Total	276 kg	Song Kuk-hyang	North Korea	13 May 2025	Asian Championships	Jiangshan, China	
76 kg
Snatch	125 kg	Liao Guifang	China	13 May 2025	Asian Championships	Jiangshan, China	
Clean & Jerk	156 kg	Zhang Wangli	China	26 February 2019	World Cup	Fuzhou, China	
Total	279 kg	Liao Guifang	China	13 May 2025	Asian Championships	Jiangshan, China	
81 kg
Snatch	127 kg	World Standard					
Clean & Jerk	161 kg	Liang Xiaomei	China	12 December 2023	IWF Grand Prix	Doha, Qatar	
Total	284 kg	Liang Xiaomei	China	12 December 2023	IWF Grand Prix	Doha, Qatar	
87 kg
Snatch	132 kg	World Standard					
Clean & Jerk	164 kg	World Standard					
Total	294 kg	World Standard					
+87 kg
Snatch	149 kg	Li Yan	China	15 December 2024	World Championships	Manama, Bahrain	
Clean & Jerk	187 kg	Li Wenwen	China	25 April 2021	Asian Championships	Tashkent, Uzbekistan	
Total	335 kg	Li Wenwen	China	25 April 2021	Asian Championships	Tashkent, Uzbekistan	

=== Women (1998–2018) ===
Event	Record	Athlete	Nation	Date	Meet	Place	Ref
48 kg
Snatch	98 kg	Yang Lian	China	1 October 2006	World Championships	(Dominican Republic) Santo Domingo, Dominican	
Clean & Jerk	120 kg	Chen Xiexia^{2}	China	21 April 2007	Asian Championships	Tai'an, China	
Total	217 kg	Yang Lian	China	1 October 2006	World Championships	(Dominican Republic) Santo Domingo, Dominican	
53 kg
Snatch	103 kg	Li Ping	China	14 November 2010	Asian Games	Guangzhou, China	
Clean & Jerk	134 kg	Zulfiya Chinshanlo	Kazakhstan	10 November 2014	World Championships	Almaty, Kazakhstan	
Total	233 kg	Hsu Shu-ching	Chinese Taipei	21 September 2014	Asian Games	Incheon, South Korea	
58 kg
Snatch	112 kg	Boyanka Kostova	Azerbaijan	23 November 2015	World Championships	Houston, United States	
Clean & Jerk	142 kg	Kuo Hsing-chun	Chinese Taipei	21 August 2017	Universiade	Taipei, Taiwan	
Total	252 kg	Boyanka Kostova	Azerbaijan	23 November 2015	World Championships	Houston, United States	
63 kg
Snatch	117 kg	Svetlana Tsarukaeva	Russia	8 November 2011	World Championships	Paris, France	
Clean & Jerk	147 kg	Deng Wei	China	9 August 2016	Olympic Games	Rio de Janeiro, Brazil	
Total	262 kg	Deng Wei	China	9 August 2016	Olympic Games	Rio de Janeiro, Brazil	
69 kg
Snatch	123 kg	Oxana Slivenko	Russia	4 October 2006	World Championships	(Dominican Republic) Santo Domingo, Dominican	
Clean & Jerk	157 kg	Zarema Kasaeva	Russia	13 November 2005	World Championships	Doha, Qatar	
Total	276 kg	Oxana Slivenko	Russia	24 September 2007	World Championships	Chiang Mai, Thailand	
75 kg
Snatch	135 kg	Natalya Zabolotnaya	Russia	17 December 2011	President's Cup	Belgorod, Russia	
Clean & Jerk	164 kg	Kim Un-ju	North Korea	25 September 2014	Asian Games	Incheon, South Korea	
Total	296 kg	Natalya Zabolotnaya	Russia	17 December 2011	President's Cup	Belgorod, Russia	
90 kg
Snatch	130 kg	Viktoriya Shaimardanova	Ukraine	21 August 2004	Olympic Games	Piraeus, Greece	
Clean & Jerk	155 kg	Derya Açıkgöz^{3}	Turkey	26 April 2002	European Championships	Antalya, Turkey	
Total	280 kg	Viktoriya Shaimardanova^{4}	Ukraine	21 August 2004	Olympic Games	Piraeus, Greece	
+90 kg
Snatch	151 kg	Tatiana Kashirina^{5}	Russia	5 August 2012	Olympic Games	(United Kingdom) London, Great Britain	
Clean & Jerk	192 kg	Zhou Lulu^{5}	China	26 September 2014	Asian Games	Incheon, South Korea	
Total	334 kg^{6}	Zhou Lulu^{5}	China	26 September 2014	Asian Games	Incheon, South Korea	

^2 The IWF website still lists Nurcan Taylan's (Türkiye) record of 121 kg in the clean and jerk, which was later disqualified for doping.

^3 The IWF website stil lists Hripsime Khurshudyan's (Armenia) record of 160 kg in the clean and jerk, which was later disqualified for doping.

^4 The IWF website still lists Hripsime Khurshudyan's record of 283 kg in total, which was later disqualified for doping.

^5 The IWF website still lists Tatiana Kachirina's records of 155 kg in the snatch, 193 kg in the clean and jerk and 348 kg in total, who was later disqualified for doping.

^6 It was not an official world record, but the best result, equal to the world record until then, and the Asian record in that period.

=== Women (1993–1997) ===
Event	Record	Athlete	Nation	Date	Meet	Place	Ref
46 kg
Snatch	81.5 kg	Jiang Yinsu	China	11 May 1997	East Asian Games	Busan, South Korea	
Clean & Jerk	105.5 kg	Xing Fen	China	8 July 1997	Asian Championships	Yangzhou, China	
Total	185.0 kg	Guan Hong	China	4 April 1996	Asian Championships	Yachiyo, Japan	
50 kg
Snatch	88.0 kg	Jiang Baoyu	China	3 July 1995	Asian Championships	Busan, South Korea	
Clean & Jerk	110.5 kg	Liu Xiuhua	China	3 October 1994	Asian Games	Hiroshima, Japan	
Total	197.5 kg	Liu Xiuhua	China	3 October 1994	Asian Games	Hiroshima, Japan	
54 kg
Snatch	93.5 kg	Yang Xia	China	9 July 1997	Asian Championships	Yangzhou, China	
Clean & Jerk	117.5 kg	Meng Xianjuan	China	8 December 1997	World Championships	Chiang Mai, Thailand	
Total	207.5 kg	Yang Xia	China	9 July 1997	Asian Championships	Yangzhou, China	
59 kg
Snatch	100.0 kg	Zou Feie	China	13 May 1997	East Asian Games	Busan, South Korea	
Clean & Jerk	125.0 kg	Khassaraporn Suta	Thailand	13 October 1997	Southeast Asian Games	Jakarta, Indonesia	
Total	220.0 kg	Chen Xiaomin	China	4 October 1994	Asian Games	Hiroshima, Japan	
64 kg
Snatch	107.5 kg	Chen Xiaomin	China	10 July 1997	Asian Championships	Yangzhou, China	
Clean & Jerk	131.0 kg	Chen Yanqing	China	10 December 1997	World Championships	Chiang Mai, Thailand	
Total	235.0 kg	Li Hongyun	China	22 November 1994	World Championships	Istanbul, Turkey	
70 kg
Snatch	105.5 kg	Xiang Fenglan	China	11 December 1997	World Championships	Chiang Mai, Thailand	
Clean & Jerk	130.5 kg	Xiang Fenglan	China	11 December 1997	World Championships	Chiang Mai, Thailand	
Total	235.0 kg	Xiang Fenglan	China	11 December 1997	World Championships	Chiang Mai, Thailand	
76 kg
Snatch	107.5 kg	Hua Ju	China	12 December 1997	World Championships	Chiang Mai, Thailand	
Clean & Jerk	140.5 kg	Hua Ju	China	12 December 1997	World Championships	Chiang Mai, Thailand	
Total	247.5 kg	Hua Ju	China	12 December 1997	World Championships	Chiang Mai, Thailand	
83 kg
Snatch	117.5 kg	Tang Weifang	China	13 December 1997	World Championships	Chiang Mai, Thailand	
Clean & Jerk	143.0 kg	Tang Weifang	China	13 December 1997	World Championships	Chiang Mai, Thailand	
Total	260.0 kg	Tang Weifang	China	13 December 1997	World Championships	Chiang Mai, Thailand	
+83 kg
Snatch	112.5 kg	Wang Yanmei	China	14 July 1997	Asian Championships	Yangzhou, China	
Clean & Jerk	155.0 kg	Li Yajuan	China	20 November 1993	World Championships	Melbourne, Australia	
Total	260.0 kg	Li Yajuan	China	20 November 1993	World Championships	Melbourne, Australia	

=== Women (1988–1992) ===
Event	Record	Athlete	Nation	Date	Meet	Place	Ref
44 kg
Snatch	77.5 kg	Xing Fen	China	21 December 1992	Asian Championships	Chiang Mai, Thailand	
Clean & Jerk	102.5 kg	Xing Fen	China	21 December 1992	Asian Championships	Chiang Mai, Thailand	
Total	180.0 kg	Xing Fen	China	21 December 1992	Asian Championships	Chiang Mai, Thailand	
48 kg
Snatch	83.0 kg	Liao Shuping	China	21 December 1992	Asian Championships	Chiang Mai, Thailand	
Clean & Jerk	105.5 kg	Liao Shuping	China	21 December 1992	Asian Championships	Chiang Mai, Thailand	
Total	187.5 kg	Liu Xiuhua	China	17 May 1992	World Championships	Varna, Bulgaria	
52 kg
Snatch	87.5 kg	Peng Liping	China	18 May 1992	World Championships	Varna, Bulgaria	
Clean & Jerk	115.0 kg	Peng Liping	China	18 May 1992	World Championships	Varna, Bulgaria	
Total	202.5 kg	Peng Liping	China	18 May 1992	World Championships	Varna, Bulgaria	
56 kg
Snatch	95.0 kg	Zhang Juhua	China	22 December 1992	Asian Championships	Chiang Mai, Thailand	
Clean & Jerk	120.0 kg	Zhang Juhua	China	22 December 1992	Asian Championships	Chiang Mai, Thailand	
Total	215.0 kg	Zhang Juhua	China	22 December 1992	Asian Championships	Chiang Mai, Thailand	
60 kg
Snatch	100.0 kg	Su Yuanghong	China	22 December 1992	Asian Championships	Chiang Mai, Thailand	
Clean & Jerk	125.0 kg	Li Hongyun	China	20 May 1992	World Championships	Varna, Bulgaria	
Total	222.5 kg	Li Hongyun	China	20 May 1992	World Championships	Varna, Bulgaria	
67.5 kg
Snatch	105.0 kg	Lei Li	China	22 December 1992	Asian Championships	Chiang Mai, Thailand	
Clean & Jerk	132.5 kg	Lei Li	China	22 December 1992	Asian Championships	Chiang Mai, Thailand	
Total	237.5 kg	Lei Li	China	22 December 1992	Asian Championships	Chiang Mai, Thailand	
75 kg
Snatch	107.5 kg	Hua Ju	China	22 May 1992	World Championships	Varna, Bulgaria	
Clean & Jerk	140.0 kg	Xing Shuwen	China	23 December 1992	Asian Championships	Chiang Mai, Thailand	
Total	242.5 kg	Zhang Xiaoli	China	3 October 1991	World Championships	Donaueschingen, Germany	
82.5 kg
Snatch	110.5 kg	Zang Lina	China	23 December 1992	Asian Championships	Chiang Mai, Thailand	
Clean & Jerk	145.0 kg	Zang Lina	China	23 December 1992	Asian Championships	Chiang Mai, Thailand	
Total	255.0 kg	Zang Lina	China	23 December 1992	Asian Championships	Chiang Mai, Thailand	
+82.5 kg
Snatch	115.0 kg	Li Yajuan	China	24 May 1992	World Championships	Varna, Bulgaria	
Clean & Jerk	150.0 kg	Li Yajuan	China	24 May 1992	World Championships	Varna, Bulgaria	
Total	265.0 kg	Li Yajuan	China	24 May 1992	World Championships	Varna, Bulgaria	

== See also ==
- List of Olympic records in weightlifting
- List of junior world records in Olympic weightlifting
- List of youth world records in Olympic weightlifting
- World record progression men's weightlifting
- World record progression men's weightlifting (1998–2018)
- World record progression men's weightlifting (1993–1997)
- World record progression women's weightlifting
- World record progression women's weightlifting (1998–2018)
