= Pawina Thongsuk =

Thai weightlifter (born 1979)

Pawina Thongsuk TBh
Personal information
- Born: April 18, 1979 (age 47) Sikhoraphum, Thailand
- Height: 1.56 m (5 ft 1 1/2 in)

Sport
- Country: Thailand
- Sport: Weightlifting
Medal record
Event	1st	2nd	3rd
Olympic Games	1	0	0
World Weightlifting Championships	1	0	0
Asian Games	1	1	0
Asian Weightlifting Championships	1	1	0
Total	4	2	0
Olympic Games
Gold medal – first place	2004 Athens	– 75 kg
World Championships
Gold medal – first place	2005 Doha	– 63 kg
Asian Games
Gold medal – first place	2006 Doha	– 63 kg
Silver medal – second place	2002 Busan	– 69 kg
Asian Championships
Gold medal – first place	2005 Dubai	63 kg
Silver medal – second place	2004 Almaty	69 kg

Pawina Thongsuk

Military service
- Allegiance: Thailand
- Branch/service: Royal Thai Army
- Rank: Captain

Pawina Thongsuk (born April 18, 1979 in Sikhoraphum, Surin) is a Thai weightlifter. She is a Captain in the Royal Thai Army. At the 2004 Summer Olympics in Athens, she won an Olympic gold medal with 122.5 kg snatching and 272.5 kg total in the 75 kg category. In 2005, she won the World Championship in the 63 kg category.

In the 2006 Asian Games in Doha she won the gold, as well as set a new world record for the 63 kg women's weight class with a clean and jerk of 142 kg.

== Weightlifting career - personal best lifts ==
- Clean and Jerk: 155.0 kg
- Snatch: 122.5 kg
- Total: 272.5 kg
- Olympic (full) Front Squat: 190.0 kg approx.
- (Full) Back Squat: 222.5 kg approx.
