= 2007 World Weightlifting Championships – Women's 63 kg =

The women's competition in 63 kg division was staged on September 22–23, 2007.

== Schedule ==
Date	Time	Event
22 September 2007	12:00	Group C
23 September 2007	12:00	Group B
23 September 2007	17:00	Group A

== Medalists ==
Event	Gold		Silver		Bronze	
Snatch	Liu Haixia (CHN)	115 kg	Svetlana Tsarukaeva (RUS)	115 kg	Pak Hyon-suk (PRK)	105 kg
Clean & Jerk	Liu Haixia (CHN)	142 kg	Pak Hyon-suk (PRK)	135 kg	Svetlana Tsarukaeva (RUS)	135 kg
Total	Liu Haixia (CHN)	257 kg	Svetlana Tsarukaeva (RUS)	250 kg	Pak Hyon-suk (PRK)	240 kg

== Records ==
Prior to this competition, the existing world records were as follows.

World Record	Snatch	Pawina Thongsuk (THA)	116 kg	Doha, Qatar	12 November 2005
World Record	Clean & Jerk	Pawina Thongsuk (THA)	142 kg	Doha, Qatar	4 December 2006
World Record	Total	Pawina Thongsuk (THA)	256 kg	Doha, Qatar	12 November 2005

== Results ==
Rank	Athlete	Group	Body weight	Snatch (kg)				Clean & Jerk (kg)				Total
Rank	Athlete	Group	Body weight	1	2	3	Rank	1	2	3	Rank	Total
1st place, gold medalist(s)	Liu Haixia (CHN)	A	62.60	110	113	115	1st place, gold medalist(s)	135	140	142	1st place, gold medalist(s)	257
2nd place, silver medalist(s)	Svetlana Tsarukaeva (RUS)	A	62.82	109	112	115	2nd place, silver medalist(s)	130	135	~~141~~	3rd place, bronze medalist(s)	250
3rd place, bronze medalist(s)	Pak Hyon-suk (PRK)	A	60.43	100	~~105~~	105	3rd place, bronze medalist(s)	133	~~135~~	135	2nd place, silver medalist(s)	240
4	Meline Daluzyan (ARM)	A	62.14	98	~~102~~	102	4	~~125~~	125	~~130~~	7	227
5	Olibia Toka (GRE)	A	62.04	95	98	~~100~~	8	117	122	126	5	224
6	Kim Soo-kyung (KOR)	A	62.61	95	~~98~~	~~98~~	13	123	126	129	4	224
7	Sibel Şimşek (TUR)	A	61.83	98	101	~~105~~	5	117	~~122~~	122	8	223
8	Christine Girard (CAN)	A	62.86	~~93~~	93	95	14	120	~~126~~	126	6	221
9	Luz Acosta (MEX)	A	62.82	95	~~100~~	100	6	120	~~125~~	~~125~~	10	220
10	Michaela Breeze (GBR)	A	61.41	~~97~~	~~97~~	97	9	118	~~121~~	~~121~~	11	215
11	Nguyễn Thị Thiết (VIE)	B	62.53	95	~~98~~	~~98~~	12	118	120	~~122~~	9	215
12	Milka Maneva (BUL)	B	62.10	~~90~~	90	95	11	117	~~121~~	~~121~~	13	212
13	Natalie Woolfolk (USA)	B	62.73	~~96~~	96	99	7	~~111~~	111	~~115~~	19	210
14	Dominika Misterska (POL)	A	62.54	91	93	~~95~~	15	~~112~~	112	~~115~~	18	205
15	Carissa Gump (USA)	B	61.94	~~87~~	87	~~90~~	23	111	115	117	12	204
16	Solenny Villasmil (VEN)	B	62.12	90	~~93~~	~~93~~	17	112	114	~~118~~	14	204
17	Mayu Hashida (JPN)	B	62.76	85	88	90	19	110	~~113~~	113	16	203
18	Agnès Chiquet (FRA)	B	62.70	85	~~88~~	88	21	110	114	~~116~~	15	202
19	Natallia Radukhouskaya (BLR)	B	59.82	85	~~89~~	89	20	105	108	112	17	201
20	Agatha Egbudike (NGR)	B	62.22	86	89	91	16	~~106~~	~~106~~	106	22	197
21	Vanessa Núñez (VEN)	B	62.26	85	~~90~~	90	18	~~105~~	106	~~110~~	23	196
22	Tania Whalen (CAN)	C	62.50	82	86	~~88~~	25	104	~~109~~	110	20	196
23	Tongbram Chanu Inurani (IND)	C	62.54	82	84	86	26	105	~~110~~	110	21	196
24	Muslime Sunar (FRA)	B	62.45	86	~~89~~	~~89~~	24	105	~~110~~	~~110~~	25	191
25	Komang Kardewi (INA)	C	59.97	80	~~85~~	~~85~~	29	~~105~~	105	~~107~~	24	185
26	Jacquie White (AUS)	C	62.96	83	~~86~~	~~86~~	27	~~98~~	98	~~102~~	29	181
27	Yania Baldera (DOM)	C	60.48	74	78	~~80~~	30	95	100	~~103~~	26	178
28	Marina Ohman (ISR)	B	61.31	~~81~~	81	~~84~~	28	95	~~97~~	~~97~~	31	176
29	Nikoletta Nagy (HUN)	C	62.56	~~75~~	75	~~80~~	34	~~95~~	95	100	27	175
30	Antonia Vicente (ESP)	C	62.02	72	~~77~~	77	32	93	~~97~~	97	30	174
31	Alexandrina Patris (PLW)	C	62.45	65	70	73	36	90	95	98	28	171
32	Oksana Mihailova (LAT)	C	62.86	76	78	~~80~~	31	90	93	~~95~~	33	171
33	Sheila Ramos (ESP)	C	62.40	70	75	~~77~~	33	~~93~~	~~93~~	93	32	168
34	Anna Everi (FIN)	C	59.12	70	~~74~~	74	35	85	~~90~~	90	34	164
35	Jhanta Kumari Katuwal (NEP)	C	61.79	68	70	~~72~~	37	80	83	85	35	155
36	Mita Overvliet (NED)	C	61.93	~~62~~	62	~~65~~	38	68	~~72~~	72	36	134
—	Mercedes Pérez (COL)	A	62.61	97	~~101~~	~~101~~	10	~~120~~	—	—	—	—
—	Frapti Tri Setiawati (INA)	B	60.62	80	~~87~~	87	22	~~105~~	~~105~~	~~105~~	—	—
DQ	Shwe Sin Win (MYA)	A	62.55	91	95	98	—	~~115~~	115	~~122~~	—	—
DQ	Liliana Borbón (MEX)	B	62.61	88	~~91~~	91	—	108	112	~~115~~	—	—

== New records ==
Total	257 kg	Liu Haixia (CHN)	WR
