= 2009 World Weightlifting Championships – Women's 63 kg =

The women's competition in the middleweight (– 63 kg) division was staged on November 25, 2009.

== Schedule ==
| Date | Time | Event |
|---|---|---|
| 25 November 2009 | 16:00 | Group B |
| 25 November 2009 | 19:00 | Group A |

== Medalists ==
| Event | Gold | | Silver | | Bronze | |
|---|---|---|---|---|---|---|
| Snatch | Viktoria Savenko (RUS) | 112 kg | Hanna Batsiushka (BLR) | 112 kg | Svetlana Tsarukaeva (RUS) | 111 kg |
| Clean & Jerk | Maiya Maneza (KAZ) | 141 kg | Sibel Şimşek (TUR) | 135 kg | Guo Xiyan (CHN) | 135 kg |
| Total | Maiya Maneza (KAZ) | 246 kg | Svetlana Tsarukaeva (RUS) | 246 kg | Sibel Şimşek (TUR) | 243 kg |

== Records ==
Prior to this competition, the existing world records were as follows.

| World Record | Snatch | Pawina Thongsuk (THA) | 116 kg | Doha, Qatar | 12 November 2005 |
| World Record | Clean & Jerk | Pawina Thongsuk (THA) | 142 kg | Doha, Qatar | 4 December 2006 |
| World Record | Total | Liu Haixia (CHN) | 257 kg | Chiang Mai, Thailand | 23 September 2007 |

== Results ==
| Rank | Athlete | Group | Body weight | Snatch (kg) | | | | Clean & Jerk (kg) | | | | Total |
| Rank | Athlete | Group | Body weight | 1 | 2 | 3 | Rank | 1 | 2 | 3 | Rank | Total |
|---|---|---|---|---|---|---|---|---|---|---|---|---|
| 1st place, gold medalist(s) | Maiya Maneza (KAZ) | A | 62.62 | ~~105~~ | ~~105~~ | 105 | 6 | 135 | ~~141~~ | 141 | 1st place, gold medalist(s) | 246 |
| 2nd place, silver medalist(s) | Svetlana Tsarukaeva (RUS) | A | 62.91 | 106 | 111 | ~~113~~ | 3rd place, bronze medalist(s) | 128 | 132 | 135 | 4 | 246 |
| 3rd place, bronze medalist(s) | Sibel Şimşek (TUR) | A | 62.43 | ~~108~~ | 108 | ~~111~~ | 4 | 128 | 131 | 135 | 2nd place, silver medalist(s) | 243 |
| 4 | Viktoria Savenko (RUS) | A | 62.89 | 107 | ~~111~~ | 112 | 1st place, gold medalist(s) | 126 | 130 | ~~134~~ | 7 | 242 |
| 5 | Guo Xiyan (CHN) | A | 62.54 | ~~105~~ | ~~105~~ | 105 | 5 | ~~130~~ | 130 | 135 | 3rd place, bronze medalist(s) | 240 |
| 6 | Meline Daluzyan (ARM) | A | 62.79 | 105 | ~~108~~ | ~~108~~ | 7 | 130 | ~~137~~ | ~~137~~ | 6 | 235 |
| 7 | Hanna Batsiushka (BLR) | A | 62.92 | 103 | 108 | 112 | 2nd place, silver medalist(s) | 122 | ~~127~~ | ~~127~~ | 12 | 234 |
| 8 | Kim Soo-kyung (KOR) | A | 62.94 | ~~98~~ | 98 | 101 | 12 | 128 | 131 | ~~135~~ | 5 | 232 |
| 9 | Mun Yu-ra (KOR) | A | 62.82 | 100 | ~~104~~ | 104 | 8 | 120 | 125 | ~~128~~ | 9 | 229 |
| 10 | Ruth Kasirye (NOR) | A | 62.89 | 99 | 103 | ~~106~~ | 9 | 123 | ~~126~~ | ~~126~~ | 10 | 226 |
| 11 | Mercedes Pérez (COL) | B | 62.62 | ~~95~~ | 95 | 100 | 13 | 122 | 125 | ~~128~~ | 8 | 225 |
| 12 | Esmat Mansour (EGY) | B | 62.25 | 97 | 101 | ~~103~~ | 11 | 120 | ~~124~~ | ~~125~~ | 13 | 221 |
| 13 | Wandee Kameaim (THA) | B | 62.05 | 93 | 96 | ~~99~~ | 15 | 122 | ~~125~~ | ~~125~~ | 11 | 218 |
| 14 | Lu Ying-chi (TPE) | B | 62.84 | 90 | 95 | 98 | 14 | 120 | ~~125~~ | ~~125~~ | 14 | 218 |
| 15 | Luz Acosta (MEX) | B | 62.94 | 100 | 103 | ~~105~~ | 10 | 115 | ~~120~~ | ~~121~~ | 18 | 218 |
| 16 | Mayu Hashida (JPN) | B | 62.91 | 89 | 92 | 94 | 16 | 114 | 117 | ~~120~~ | 15 | 211 |
| 17 | Lenka Orságová (CZE) | B | 62.53 | 90 | 92 | ~~94~~ | 17 | 115 | ~~118~~ | ~~119~~ | 17 | 207 |
| 18 | Tatyana Kostenko (KAZ) | B | 61.27 | 83 | ~~88~~ | 88 | 19 | 107 | 112 | 115 | 16 | 203 |
| 19 | Muslime Sunar (FRA) | B | 62.75 | ~~88~~ | ~~90~~ | 90 | 18 | 107 | 110 | ~~112~~ | 19 | 200 |
| 20 | Elena Sisoeva (UZB) | B | 62.92 | 84 | 88 | ~~92~~ | 20 | 95 | 100 | ~~107~~ | 23 | 188 |
| 21 | Sheila Ramos (ESP) | B | 62.92 | 75 | 78 | ~~81~~ | 23 | 100 | 103 | 106 | 20 | 184 |
| 22 | Hortense Nguidjol (CMR) | B | 62.65 | ~~77~~ | 77 | ~~82~~ | 24 | 100 | ~~105~~ | ~~107~~ | 22 | 177 |
| 23 | Jacquelynn Berube (USA) | B | 62.77 | 74 | 76 | 78 | 22 | 98 | ~~103~~ | ~~105~~ | 24 | 176 |
| 24 | Dora Afi Abotsi (GHA) | B | 61.70 | ~~63~~ | 63 | 65 | 25 | 70 | ~~75~~ | 77 | 25 | 142 |
| — | Sukanya Kunrit (THA) | B | 61.15 | ~~85~~ | 85 | ~~89~~ | 21 | — | — | — | — | — |
| — | Marie Fegue (CMR) | B | 61.88 | ~~80~~ | ~~80~~ | ~~82~~ | — | 95 | ~~100~~ | 102 | 21 | — |
