= List of South Korean records in Olympic weightlifting =

The following are the national records in Olympic weightlifting in South Korea. Records are maintained in each weight class for the snatch lift, clean and jerk lift, and the total for both lifts by the Korea Weightlifting Federation.

== Current records ==
=== Men ===
Event	Record	Athlete	Date	Meet	Place	Ref
55 kg
Snatch	120 kg	Standard				
Clean & Jerk	151 kg	Standard				
Total	270 kg	Standard				
61 kg
Snatch	134 kg	Lee Hye-sung	17 October 2023	Korean National Sports Festival	Jeonnam, South Korea	
Clean & Jerk	164 kg	Shin Rok	18 October 2021		Yanggu County, South Korea	
Total	294 kg	Shin Rok	18 October 2021		Yanggu County, South Korea	
67 kg
Snatch	147 kg	Han Myeong-mok	8 October 2019	Korean National Sports Festival	Seoul, South Korea	
Clean & Jerk	183 kg	Lee Sang-yeon	17 October 2023	Korean National Sports Festival	Jeonnam, South Korea	
Total	323 kg	Standard				
73 kg
Snatch	157 kg	Standard				
Clean & Jerk	196 kg	Lee Sang-yeon	14 May 2024			
Total	350 kg	Standard				
81 kg
Snatch	163 kg	Standard				
Clean & Jerk	204 kg	Standard				
Total	365 kg	Standard				
89 kg
Snatch	171 kg	Standard				
Clean & Jerk	212 kg	Standard				
Total	381 kg	Standard				
96 kg
Snatch	182 kg	Jang Yeon-hak	12 October 2022	Korean National Sports Festival	Ulsan, South Korea	
Clean & Jerk	219 kg	Won Jong-beom	7 April 2024	World Cup	Phuket, Thailand	
Total	397 kg	Standard				
102 kg
Snatch	185 kg	Standard				
Clean & Jerk	222 kg	Standard				
Total	405 kg	Standard				
109 kg
Snatch	190 kg	Standard				
Clean & Jerk	233 kg	Standard				
Total	422 kg	Standard				
+109 kg
Snatch	200 kg	Standard				
Clean & Jerk	241 kg	Lee Jae-sang	17 September 2023	World Championships	Riyadh, Saudi Arabia	
Total	438 kg	Standard				

=== Women ===
Event	Record	Athlete	Date	Meet	Place	Ref
45 kg
Snatch	78 kg	Standard				
Clean & Jerk	100 kg	Standard				
Total	176 kg	Standard				
49 kg
Snatch	85 kg	Standard				
Clean & Jerk	105 kg	Standard				
Total	188 kg	Standard				
55 kg
Snatch	90 kg	Standard				
Clean & Jerk	116 kg	Ham Eun-ji	6 July 2019	Japan-China-Korea Friendship Tournament	Tokyo, Japan	
Total	203 kg	Standard				
59 kg
Snatch	98 kg	Seo Jeong-mi	7 May 2023	Asian Championships	Jinju, South Korea	
Clean & Jerk	120 kg	Ham Eun-ji	11 August 2020			
Total	217 kg	Standard				
64 kg
Snatch	104 kg	Standard				
Clean & Jerk	128 kg	Standard				
Total	232 kg	Standard				
71 kg
Snatch	110 kg	Standard				
Clean & Jerk	135 kg	Standard				
Total	243 kg	Standard				
76 kg
Snatch	114 kg	Standard				
Clean & Jerk	143 kg	Kim Su-hyeon	10 October 2022	Korean National Sports Festival	Ulsan, South Korea	
Total	254 kg	Standard				
81 kg
Snatch	118 kg	Standard				
Clean & Jerk	148 kg	Standard				
Total	265 kg	Standard				
87 kg
Snatch	120 kg	Standard				
Clean & Jerk	152 kg	Standard				
Total	271 kg	Standard				
+87 kg
Snatch	131 kg	Park Hye-jeong	11 August 2024	Olympic Games	Paris, France	
Clean & Jerk	170 kg	Park Hye-jeong	17 October 2023	Korean National Sports Festival	Jeonnam, South Korea	
Total	299 kg	Park Hye-jeong	11 August 2024	Olympic Games	Paris, France	

== Historical records ==
=== Men (1998–2018) ===
Event	Record	Athlete	Date	Meet	Place	Ref
-56 kg
Snatch	126 kg	Lee Jong-Hoon	23 April 2008		Pohang, South Korea	
Clean and jerk	155 kg	Lee Jong-hoon	9 November 2005	World Championships	Doha, Qatar	
Total	280 kg	Lee Jong-hoon	9 November 2005	World Championships	Doha, Qatar	
-62 kg
Snatch	143 kg	Han Myeong-mok	13 June 2014	South Korean Championships		
Clean and jerk	172 kg	Ji Hun-min	19 September 2010	World Championships	Antalya, Turkey	
Total	309 kg	Ji Hun-min	19 September 2010	World Championships	Antalya, Turkey	
-69 kg
Snatch	155 kg	Lee Bae-young	12 August 2008	Olympic Games	Beijing, China	
Clean and jerk	195 kg	Kim Hak-bong	9 December 1998	Asian Games	Bangkok, Thailand	
Total	343 kg	Lee Bae-young	23 April 2008			
-77 kg
Snatch	165 kg	Sa Jae-hyouk	6 October 2011	Korean National Sports Festival		
Clean and jerk	211 kg	Sa Jae-hyouk	17 May 2010	South Korean Championships		
Total	375 kg	Sa Jae-hyouk	17 May 2010	South Korean Championships		
-85 kg
Snatch	171 kg	Sa Jae-hyouk	24 September 2014	Asian Games	Incheon, South Korea	
Clean and jerk	212 kg	Song Jong-sik	24 June 2003	South Korean Championships		
Total	382 kg	Song Jong-sik	24 June 2003	South Korean Championships		
-94 kg
Snatch	185 kg	Kim Min-jae	4 August 2012	Olympic Games	London, Great Britain	
Clean and jerk	221 kg	Jung Hyeon-seop	16 October 2012	Korean National Sports Festival		
Total	396 kg	Kim Min-jae	12 November 2011	World Championships	Paris, France	
-105 kg
Snatch	190 kg	Choi Jong-keun	16 October 1999	Korean National Sports Festival		
Clean and jerk	226 kg	Choi Jong-keun	16 October 1999	Korean National Sports Festival		
Total	415 kg	Choi Jong-keun	25 June 1999	South Korean Championships		
+105 kg
Snatch	206 kg	An Yong-kwon	26 June 2009			
Clean and jerk	260 kg	Kim Tae-hyun	26 September 2000	Olympic Games	Sydney, Australia	
Total	460 kg	Kim Tae-hyun	26 September 2000	Olympic Games	Sydney, Australia	

=== Women (1998–2018) ===
Event	Record	Athlete	Date	Meet	Place	Ref
-48 kg
Snatch	87 kg	Im Jyoung-hwa	20 October 2009	Korean National Sports Festival		
Clean and jerk	110 kg	Im Jyoung-hwa	9 August 2008	Olympic Games	Beijing, China	
Total	196 kg	Im Jyoung-hwa	9 August 2008	Olympic Games	Beijing, China	
-53 kg
Snatch	99 kg	Yoon Jin-hee	24 April 2008			
Clean and jerk	123 kg	Yoon Jin-hee	24 April 2008			
Total	222 kg	Yoon Jin-hee	24 April 2008			
-58 kg
Snatch	98 kg	Kim So-hwa	27 June 2017	South Korean Women's Championships	Incheon, South Korea	
Clean and jerk	122 kg	Yoon Jin-hee	21 May 2006			
Total	217 kg	Im Jyoung-hwa	21 June 2005	South Korean Championships		
-63 kg
Snatch	107 kg	Kim Soo-kyung	21 September 2010	World Championships	Antalya, Turkey	
Clean and jerk	133 kg	Kim Soo-kyung	16 November 2010	Asian Games	Guangzhou, China	
Total	240 kg	Kim Soo-kyung	16 November 2010	Asian Games	Guangzhou, China	
-69 kg
Snatch	108 kg	Mun Yu-ra	17 August 2011	Universiade	Shenzhen, China	
Clean and jerk	135 kg	Kim Su-hyeon	27 June 2017	South Korean Women's Championships	Incheon, South Korea	
Total	240 kg	Mun Yu-ra	23 June 2011	South Korean Championships		
-75 kg
Snatch	115 kg	Kim Soon-hee	22 May 2006			
Clean and jerk	143 kg	Kim Soon-hee	22 May 2006			
Total	258 kg	Kim Soon-hee	22 May 2006			
-90 kg
Snatch	127 kg	Standard				
Clean and jerk	165 kg	Standard				
Total	292 kg	Standard				
+90 kg
Snatch	140 kg	Jang Mi-ran	16 August 2008	Olympic Games	Beijing, China	
Clean and jerk	187 kg	Jang Mi-ran	28 November 2009	World Championships	Goyang, South Korea	
Total	326 kg	Jang Mi-ran	16 August 2008	Olympic Games	Beijing, China	
