= 2006 World Weightlifting Championships – Women's 63 kg =

The 2006 World Weightlifting Championships were held in Santo Domingo, Dominican Republic from 30 September to 7 October. The women's 63 kilograms division was staged on 3 and 4 October 2006.

== Schedule ==
Date	Time	Event
3 October 2006	18:00	Group C
4 October 2006	10:00	Group B
4 October 2006	14:00	Group A

== Medalists ==
Event	Gold		Silver		Bronze	
Snatch	Ouyang Xiaofang (CHN)	110 kg	Svetlana Shimkova (RUS)	108 kg	Meline Daluzyan (ARM)	105 kg
Clean & Jerk	Ouyang Xiaofang (CHN)	136 kg	Svetlana Shimkova (RUS)	133 kg	Meline Daluzyan (ARM)	127 kg
Total	Ouyang Xiaofang (CHN)	246 kg	Svetlana Shimkova (RUS)	241 kg	Meline Daluzyan (ARM)	232 kg

== Records ==
Prior to this competition, the existing world records were as follows.

World Record	Snatch	Pawina Thongsuk (THA)	116 kg	Doha, Qatar	12 November 2005
World Record	Clean & Jerk	Svetlana Shimkova (RUS)	141 kg	Władysławowo, Poland	3 May 2006
World Record	Total	Pawina Thongsuk (THA)	256 kg	Doha, Qatar	12 November 2005

== Results ==
Rank	Athlete	Group	Body weight	Snatch (kg)				Clean & Jerk (kg)				Total
Rank	Athlete	Group	Body weight	1	2	3	Rank	1	2	3	Rank	Total
1st place, gold medalist(s)	Ouyang Xiaofang (CHN)	A	62.37	~~110~~	~~110~~	110	1st place, gold medalist(s)	130	~~136~~	136	1st place, gold medalist(s)	246
2nd place, silver medalist(s)	Svetlana Shimkova (RUS)	A	62.81	105	~~108~~	108	2nd place, silver medalist(s)	133	~~139~~	~~139~~	2nd place, silver medalist(s)	241
3rd place, bronze medalist(s)	Meline Daluzyan (ARM)	A	62.32	100	~~103~~	105	3rd place, bronze medalist(s)	122	125	127	3rd place, bronze medalist(s)	232
4	Kim Soo-kyung (KOR)	A	63.00	93	96	~~99~~	7	121	~~126~~	126	4	222
5	Luz Acosta (MEX)	B	62.76	95	98	~~100~~	5	117	~~121~~	121	5	219
6	Esmat Mansour (EGY)	A	61.41	93	~~97~~	97	6	120	~~125~~	~~125~~	6	217
7	Milka Maneva (BUL)	B	62.68	90	93	95	8	117	120	~~124~~	7	215
8	Lu Ying-chi (TPE)	A	62.89	~~95~~	95	~~98~~	9	~~120~~	~~120~~	120	8	215
9	Natalie Woolfolk (USA)	A	62.35	98	~~102~~	~~102~~	4	107	111	~~114~~	19	209
10	Dominika Misterska (POL)	A	62.68	~~93~~	~~93~~	93	11	116	~~118~~	~~118~~	11	209
11	Nguyễn Thị Thiết (VIE)	A	62.68	~~92~~	92	~~98~~	12	~~113~~	113	117	10	209
12	Christine Girard (CAN)	B	62.75	~~90~~	90	~~93~~	14	116	119	~~121~~	9	209
13	Gergana Kirilova (BUL)	A	62.92	93	~~95~~	95	10	112	~~115~~	~~115~~	18	207
14	Hebatalla Ibrahim (EGY)	B	62.83	90	~~93~~	~~93~~	15	110	116	~~120~~	12	206
15	Sureerat Thongsuk (THA)	B	59.78	90	~~95~~	~~95~~	13	110	115	~~120~~	13	205
16	Nísida Palomeque (COL)	C	62.40	83	87	89	16	107	112	115	14	204
17	Lenka Orságová (CZE)	B	61.92	87	~~91~~	~~91~~	18	110	~~113~~	113	15	200
18	Olibia Toka (GRE)	B	62.39	87	~~91~~	~~91~~	19	107	112	~~117~~	17	199
19	Miel McGerrigle (CAN)	C	62.25	85	88	~~90~~	17	105	110	~~112~~	20	198
20	Agnès Chiquet (FRA)	B	61.72	78	82	~~84~~	22	108	112	~~116~~	16	194
21	Rosa Tenorio (ECU)	B	61.97	85	~~89~~	~~89~~	20	102	~~107~~	~~107~~	22	187
22	Jacquie White (AUS)	C	62.85	80	~~83~~	83	21	93	97	~~100~~	23	180
23	Nikoletta Nagy (HUN)	C	62.92	72	~~76~~	~~76~~	26	97	~~100~~	~~100~~	24	169
24	Antonia Vicente (ESP)	C	62.24	~~73~~	73	~~76~~	25	~~93~~	~~93~~	93	25	166
25	Patricia Sosa (ESP)	C	61.99	~~73~~	73	~~76~~	24	~~92~~	92	—	26	165
26	Angie Toledo (CHI)	C	62.45	70	~~75~~	75	23	90	~~97~~	~~97~~	27	165
—	Liliana Borbón (MEX)	B	62.95	~~90~~	~~90~~	~~90~~	—	110	~~115~~	~~115~~	21	—
