= Hortense Nguidjol =

Cameroonian weightlifter

Personal information
- Full name: Hortense Nguidjol Essesse
- Nationality: Cameroonian
- Born: 17 May 1981 (age 45)
- Weight: 69 kg (152 lb)

Sport
- Country: Cameroon
- Sport: Weightlifting
Medal record
Women's weightlifting
Representing Cameroon
African Championships
Silver medal – second place	2009 Kampala	63 kg
Silver medal – second place	2010 Yaoundé	63 kg
- Updated on 4 June 2020

Hortense Nguidjol Essesse (born 17 May 1981 in Cameroon) is a former Cameroonian weightlifter. She was a multiple medalist at the African Weightlifting Championships. She competed at the 2002 Commonwealth Games.

== Major results ==
Year	Venue	Weight	Snatch (kg)					Clean & Jerk (kg)					Total	Rank
Year	Venue	Weight	1	2	3	Result	Rank	1	2	3	Result	Rank	Total	Rank
Representing Cameroon
World Championships
2009	Goyang, South Korea	63 kg	~~77~~	77	~~82~~	77	24	100	~~105~~	~~107~~	100	22	177	22
African Championships
2016	Yaoundé, Cameroon	75 kg	~~70~~	70	75	75	6	95	100	~~103~~	100	3rd place, bronze medalist(s)	175	5
2012	Nairobi, Kenya	+75 kg	~~70~~	~~70~~	~~70~~	–	–	85	95	~~100~~	95	5	–	–
2010	Yaoundé, Cameroon	63 kg	~~75~~	75	80	80	2nd place, silver medalist(s)	~~100~~	~~100~~	100	100	1st place, gold medalist(s)	180	2nd place, silver medalist(s)
2009	Kampala, Uganda	63 kg	—N/a	—N/a	—N/a	80	3rd place, bronze medalist(s)	—N/a	—N/a	—N/a	105	2nd place, silver medalist(s)	185	2nd place, silver medalist(s)
2008	Strand, South Africa	63 kg	70	~~80~~	~~80~~	70	4	100	~~105~~	105	105	3rd place, bronze medalist(s)	175	4
African Games
2015	Brazzaville, Republic of the Congo	75 kg	75	~~80~~	~~80~~	75	6	100	~~105~~	~~105~~	100	5	175	5
2007	Algiers, Algeria	75 kg	78	82	85	85	5	~~105~~	107	~~113~~	107	5	192	5
1999	Johannesburg, South Africa	63 kg	—N/a	—N/a	—N/a	70.0	3rd place, bronze medalist(s)	—N/a	—N/a	—N/a	—N/a	—N/a	—N/a	—N/a
Commonwealth Games
2002	(United Kingdom) Manchester, Great Britain	75 kg	~~62.5~~	~~65.0~~	65.0	65.0	5	85.0	90.0	~~92.5~~	90.0	6	155.0	5
