= Weightlifting at the 2008 Summer Olympics – Women's 63 kg =

Women's 63 kg at the Games of the XXIX Olympiad
- Venue: Beihang University Gymnasium
- Date: 12 August 2008
- Competitors: 20 from 18 nations

Medalists
1st place, gold medalist(s)		Pak Hyon-suk	North Korea
2nd place, silver medalist(s)		Lu Ying-chi	Chinese Taipei
3rd place, bronze medalist(s)		Christine Girard	Canada

The women's 63 kilograms weightlifting event was the fourth women's event at the weightlifting competition, with competitors limited to a maximum of 63 kilograms of body mass. The whole competition took place on August 12, but was divided in two parts due to the number of competitors. Group B weightlifters competed at 12:30, and Group A, at 15:30. This event was the sixth Weightlifting event to conclude.

Each lifter performed in both the snatch and clean and jerk lifts, with the final score being the sum of the lifter's best result in each. The athlete received three attempts in each of the two lifts; the score for the lift was the heaviest weight successfully lifted.

== Schedule ==
All times are China Standard Time (UTC+8)

Date	Time	Event
12 August 2008	12:30	Group B
12 August 2008	15:30	Group A

== Records ==
Prior to this competition, the existing world and Olympic records were as follows.

World Record	Snatch	Pawina Thongsuk (THA)	116 kg	Doha, Qatar	12 November 2005
World Record	Clean & Jerk	Pawina Thongsuk (THA)	142 kg	Doha, Qatar	4 December 2006
World Record	Total	Liu Haixia (CHN)	257 kg	Chiang Mai, Thailand	23 September 2007
Olympic Record	Snatch	Hanna Batsiushka (BLR)	115 kg	Athens, Greece	18 August 2004
Olympic Record	Clean & Jerk	Nataliya Skakun (UKR)	135 kg	Athens, Greece	18 August 2004
Olympic Record	Total	Chen Xiaomin (CHN)	242 kg	Sydney, Australia	19 September 2000

== Results ==
Rank	Athlete	Group	Body weight	Snatch (kg)				Clean & Jerk (kg)				Total
Rank	Athlete	Group	Body weight	1	2	3	Result	1	2	3	Result	Total
1st place, gold medalist(s)	Pak Hyon-suk (PRK)	A	61.80	102	106	~~108~~	106	~~135~~	~~135~~	135	135	241
2nd place, silver medalist(s)	Lu Ying-chi (TPE)	A	62.46	98	102	104	104	127	~~130~~	~~130~~	127	231
3rd place, bronze medalist(s)	Christine Girard (CAN)	A	62.44	96	99	102	102	126	~~130~~	~~130~~	126	228
4	Nguyễn Thị Thiết (VIE)	A	62.49	98	100	~~102~~	100	120	125	~~127~~	125	225
5	Kim Soo-kyung (KOR)	A	62.74	98	~~102~~	~~103~~	98	127	~~134~~	~~134~~	127	225
6	Ruth Kasirye (NOR)	A	62.62	99	103	~~105~~	103	121	~~125~~	~~125~~	121	224
7	Luz Acosta (MEX)	B	62.84	100	~~103~~	103	103	120	~~125~~	~~125~~	120	223
8	Mercedes Pérez (COL)	A	62.48	93	97	~~100~~	97	120	~~126~~	~~126~~	120	217
9	Namkhaidorjiin Bayarmaa (MGL)	B	62.50	90	~~95~~	~~95~~	90	118	121	123	123	213
10	Dominika Misterska (POL)	B	62.60	92	94	~~95~~	94	115	~~117~~	117	117	211
11	Natalie Woolfolk (USA)	B	62.72	93	97	~~101~~	97	107	111	114	114	211
12	Solenny Villasmil (VEN)	B	62.60	90	~~95~~	~~95~~	90	~~115~~	~~115~~	115	115	205
13	Carissa Gump (USA)	B	62.20	~~85~~	85	88	88	~~116~~	116	~~121~~	116	204
14	Michaela Breeze (GBR)	B	61.55	80	85	—	85	80	90	100	100	185
15	Hanene Ourfelli (TUN)	B	62.38	80	~~85~~	~~85~~	80	95	~~100~~	~~106~~	95	175
16	María Teresa Monasterio (BOL)	B	62.96	60	63	~~65~~	63	75	78	~~80~~	78	141
—	Svetlana Tsarukaeva (RUS)	A	62.37	~~107~~	~~107~~	~~107~~	—	—	—	—	—	—
—	Leila Lassouani (ALG)	B	62.28	85	~~90~~	~~90~~	85	~~110~~	~~110~~	~~110~~	—	—
DQ	Irina Nekrassova (KAZ)	A	62.86	105	110	~~112~~	110	130	~~135~~	~~135~~	130	~~240~~
DQ	Maiya Maneza (KAZ)	A	62.12	—	—	—	—	—	—	—	—	—

- Irina Nekrassova of Kazakhstan originally finished second, but was disqualified after she tested positive for stanozolol.
