= 2011 World Weightlifting Championships – Women's 63 kg =

The women's competition in the middleweight (– 63 kg) division was held on 7–8 November 2011.

== Schedule ==
Date	Time	Event
7 November 2011	21:30	Group C
8 November 2011	11:30	Group B
8 November 2011	16:30	Group A

== Medalists ==
Event	Gold		Silver		Bronze	
Snatch	Svetlana Tsarukaeva (RUS)	117 kg	Ouyang Xiaofang (CHN)	113 kg	Maiya Maneza (KAZ)	109 kg
Clean & Jerk	Maiya Maneza (KAZ)	139 kg	Svetlana Tsarukaeva (RUS)	138 kg	Roxana Cocoș (ROU)	136 kg
Total	Svetlana Tsarukaeva (RUS)	255 kg	Maiya Maneza (KAZ)	248 kg	Ouyang Xiaofang (CHN)	246 kg

== Records ==
Prior to this competition, the existing world records were as follows.

World Record	Snatch	Pawina Thongsuk (THA)	116 kg	Doha, Qatar	12 November 2005
World Record	Clean & Jerk	Maiya Maneza (KAZ)	143 kg	Antalya, Turkey	20 September 2010
World Record	Total	Liu Haixia (CHN)	257 kg	Chiang Mai, Thailand	23 September 2007

== Results ==
Rank	Athlete	Group	Body weight	Snatch (kg)				Clean & Jerk (kg)				Total
Rank	Athlete	Group	Body weight	1	2	3	Rank	1	2	3	Rank	Total
1st place, gold medalist(s)	Svetlana Tsarukaeva (RUS)	A	62.17	110	114	117	1st place, gold medalist(s)	130	135	138	2nd place, silver medalist(s)	255
2nd place, silver medalist(s)	Maiya Maneza (KAZ)	A	62.31	~~106~~	106	109	3rd place, bronze medalist(s)	~~139~~	139	~~147~~	1st place, gold medalist(s)	248
3rd place, bronze medalist(s)	Ouyang Xiaofang (CHN)	A	62.87	110	~~113~~	113	2nd place, silver medalist(s)	~~133~~	~~133~~	133	7	246
4	Roxana Cocoș (ROU)	A	62.72	100	104	107	6	131	136	~~140~~	3rd place, bronze medalist(s)	243
5	Pak Hyon-suk (PRK)	A	62.05	102	~~107~~	108	4	~~133~~	133	~~140~~	5	241
6	Marina Shainova (RUS)	A	62.35	~~106~~	106	~~109~~	7	135	~~140~~	~~140~~	4	241
7	Christine Girard (CAN)	A	62.85	101	105	~~108~~	8	129	133	~~136~~	6	238
8	Kim Soo-kyung (KOR)	A	62.87	98	~~101~~	101	11	125	130	~~132~~	8	231
9	Nísida Palomeque (COL)	A	62.13	97	101	~~103~~	10	~~123~~	123	127	9	228
10	Hanna Batsiushka (BLR)	A	62.68	100	107	~~110~~	5	117	~~123~~	~~123~~	14	224
11	Luz Acosta (MEX)	B	62.79	99	104	~~106~~	9	119	~~124~~	~~124~~	13	223
12	Obioma Okoli (NGR)	C	62.41	91	94	95	13	117	122	125	11	220
13	Ruth Kasirye (NOR)	A	62.62	98	~~101~~	~~101~~	12	118	122	~~125~~	12	220
14	Mariya Khlyan (UKR)	B	61.74	93	~~97~~	~~97~~	14	~~114~~	114	—	15	207
15	Zoe Smith (GBR)	B	62.87	85	90	92	15	105	110	112	20	204
16	Neslihan Okumuş (TUR)	B	62.91	85	88	~~91~~	20	105	110	114	16	202
17	Nikoletta Nagy (HUN)	B	62.17	88	~~91~~	~~91~~	17	109	112	~~115~~	17	200
18	Valérie Lefebvre (CAN)	B	62.59	~~88~~	88	~~90~~	18	112	~~115~~	~~115~~	18	200
19	Anna Leśniewska (POL)	B	62.67	~~88~~	88	~~90~~	19	112	~~115~~	~~116~~	19	200
20	Nguyễn Thị Lợi (VIE)	C	61.88	80	85	~~92~~	21	105	110	~~115~~	21	195
21	Marieta Gotfryd (POL)	B	62.68	90	~~93~~	~~93~~	16	105	~~109~~	~~109~~	24	195
22	Martha Malla (ECU)	B	62.69	~~85~~	85	~~88~~	22	105	109	~~113~~	22	194
23	Anna Everi (FIN)	C	59.43	80	~~83~~	~~83~~	25	102	107	~~109~~	23	187
24	Sherjana Ruci (ALB)	C	60.80	80	~~83~~	83	24	98	101	101	25	184
25	Poireinganbi Chanu (IND)	C	62.63	75	80	~~82~~	26	95	100	~~102~~	26	180
26	Irene Martínez (ESP)	C	62.70	79	83	85	23	95	~~100~~	~~100~~	27	180
27	Jenni Puputti (FIN)	C	61.98	76	79	~~81~~	27	88	~~93~~	~~93~~	29	167
28	Maria Panagiotidou (GRE)	C	63.00	~~73~~	73	~~74~~	28	92	~~95~~	~~95~~	28	165
29	Liu Xia (MAC)	C	60.49	50	55	60	29	55	60	65	30	125
—	Namkhaidorjiin Bayarmaa (MGL)	B	60.59	~~90~~	~~95~~	~~95~~	—	120	125	~~130~~	10	—
—	Silvana Vukas (SRB)	C	62.72	~~75~~	~~75~~	~~75~~	—	—	—	—	—	—

== New records ==
Snatch	117 kg	Svetlana Tsarukaeva (RUS)	WR
