= Ismail Katamba =

Ugandan weightlifter

Personal information
- Full name: Ismail Katamba
- Born: 19 January 1987 (age 39)
- Weight: 60.57 kg (133.5 lb)

Sport
- Country: Uganda
- Sport: Weightlifting
- Weight class: 62 kg
- Team: National team
Medal record
Men's Weightlifting
Representing Uganda
African Championships
Silver medal – second place	2005 Kampala	56 kg
Bronze medal – third place	2009 Kampala	56 kg
ISSF Championships
Silver medal – second place	2014 Kampala	69 kg

Ismail Katamba (born 19 January 1987) is a Ugandan male weightlifter who has represented Uganda in several international competitions, competing in the 62 kg and 56 kg categories. He competed at world championships most recently at the 2005 World Weightlifting Championships. Ismail Katamba won four medals (gold, two silver, and a bronze) in the 56 kg category in 2004 in Tunisia in the African Championships, which helped Uganda secure Olympic tickets. Other appearances include Kampala in 2005, 2009, and 2014, and Nairobi in 2012.

== Major results ==
Year	Venue	Weight	Snatch (kg)					Clean & Jerk (kg)					Total	Rank
Year	Venue	Weight	1	2	3	Results	Rank	1	2	3	Results	Rank	Total	Rank
Representing Uganda
World Championships
2005	Doha, Qatar	62 kg	90	~~95~~	~~95~~	90	14	120	~~130~~	~~131~~	120	15	210	14
African Championships
2012	Nairobi, Kenya	62 kg	95	102	~~102~~	102	6	127	133	~~137~~	133	5	235	6
2009	Kampala, Uganda	56 kg	—N/a	—N/a	—N/a	90	8	—N/a	—N/a	—N/a	127	2nd place, silver medalist(s)	217	3rd place, bronze medalist(s)
2008	Strand, South Africa	62 kg	97	~~102~~	~~102~~	97	9	135	~~140~~	~~140~~	135	4	232	8
2005	Kampala, Uganda	56 kg	—N/a	—N/a	—N/a	—N/a	—N/a	—N/a	—N/a	—N/a	—N/a	—N/a	—N/a	2nd place, silver medalist(s)
Commonwealth Games
2010	Delhi, India	56 kg	90	~~95~~	~~95~~	90	12	~~120~~	-	-	-	-	-	-
2006	Melbourne, Australia	56 kg	90	~~95~~	~~95~~	90	13	120	~~125~~	~~125~~	120	10	210	12

== See also ==
- Uganda at the African Weightlifting Championships
- List of Ugandan sports people
- Weightlifting at the Summer Olympics
- African Weightlifting Championships
