= Dora Afi Abotsi =

Ghanaian weightlifter

Personal information
- Full name: Dora Afi Abotsi
- Nationality: Ghanaian
- Born: 22 February 1991 (age 35)
- Weight: 61.70 kg (136.0 lb)

Sport
- Country: Ghana
- Sport: Weightlifting
- Weight class: 63 kg
- Team: National team
- Updated on 31 October 2016

Dora Afi Abotsi (born 22 February 1991) is a Ghanaian female weightlifter, competing in the 63 kg category and representing Ghana at international competitions. She competed at world championships, most recently at the 2009 World Weightlifting Championships, and at several Commonwealth Games.

== Weightlifting ==
She won a bronze medal at the 2006 African Weightlifting Championships, competing in the 48 kilograms (106 lb) class, with the medals won by the team qualifying it for the world championships. She had been the only female member of the squad named for Morocco.

Abotsi took part in the 2009 World Weightlifting Championships in Goyang, South Korea, where she finished in 24th and last place in the women's 63 kilograms (139 lb) class among those competitors who completed their lifts. Cameroon's Marie Fegue and Sukanya Kunrit of Thailand were the only two competitors who failed to complete by the snatch and the clean and jerk rounds of the competition. Abotsi's overall score of 142 was over a hundred points lower than the winning score of 246 by Kazakh athlete Maiya Maneza. However, her appearance at the Championships meant that she broke the record for the youngest competitor. She represented Ghana at the 2010 Commonwealth Games in Delhi, India. Competing in the 69 kilograms (152 lb) class, she finished in ninth place in the final with a total score of 169 points, ahead of Prossy Irene Nyanga of Uganda. The gold medal was won by Canadian Christine Girard with a score of 235 points.

Abotsi captained the Ghanaian women's team at the African Weightlifting Championships in November 2013, held in Morocco. She herself won two bronze medals, while a total of 19 medals were won by the six members of both the male and female teams. She was one of the athletes trained by American coach Dr Kyle Calhoum Pierce during his tenure installing a new national coaching scheme for Ghana's weightlifters in 2014. Her improvement under Pierce was noted by Ben Nunoo Mensah, president of the Ghana Weightlifting Federation. She returned to the Commonwealth Games that year, competing in the 75 kilograms (165 lb) class and placing sixth in the final with a combined weight lifted of 192 kilograms (423 lb).

== Major results ==
Year	Venue	Weight	Snatch (kg)				Clean & Jerk (kg)				Total	Rank
Year	Venue	Weight	1	2	3	Rank	1	2	3	Rank	Total	Rank
World Championships
2009	Goyang, South Korea	63 kg	~~63~~	63	65	25	70	~~75~~	77	25	142	24
Commonwealth Games
2014	Glasgow, Scotland	75 kg	82	85	88	N/A	97	101	104	N/A	192	6
