= Weightlifting at the 2010 Asian Games – Women's 63 kg =

Women's 63 kg at the 2010 Asian Games
- Venue: Dongguan Arena
- Date: 16 November 2010
- Competitors: 6 from 5 nations

Medalists
| gold medal | Maiya Maneza | Kazakhstan |
| silver medal | Kim Soo-kyung | South Korea |
| bronze medal | Chen Aichan | China |

The women's 63 kilograms event at the 2010 Asian Games took place on 16 November 2010 at Dongguan Arena.

== Schedule ==
All times are China Standard Time (UTC+08:00)

| Date | Time | Event |
|---|---|---|
| Tuesday, 16 November 2010 | 19:00 | Group A |

== Records ==
Prior to this competition, the existing world, Asian and Games records were as follows.

| World Record | Snatch | Pawina Thongsuk (THA) | 116 kg | Doha, Qatar | 12 November 2005 |
| World Record | Clean & Jerk | Maiya Maneza (KAZ) | 143 kg | Antalya, Turkey | 20 September 2010 |
| World Record | Total | Liu Haixia (CHN) | 257 kg | Chiang Mai, Thailand | 23 September 2007 |
| Asian Record | Snatch | Pawina Thongsuk (THA) | 116 kg | Doha, Qatar | 12 November 2005 |
| Asian Record | Clean & Jerk | Maiya Maneza (KAZ) | 143 kg | Antalya, Turkey | 20 September 2010 |
| Asian Record | Total | Liu Haixia (CHN) | 257 kg | Chiang Mai, Thailand | 23 September 2007 |
| Games Record | Snatch | Ouyang Xiaofang (CHN) | 115 kg | Doha, Qatar | 4 December 2006 |
| Games Record | Clean & Jerk | Pawina Thongsuk (THA) | 142 kg | Doha, Qatar | 4 December 2006 |
| Games Record | Total | Pawina Thongsuk (THA) | 252 kg | Doha, Qatar | 4 December 2006 |

== Results ==
| Rank | Athlete | Group | Body weight | Snatch (kg) | | | | Clean & Jerk (kg) | | | | Total |
| Rank | Athlete | Group | Body weight | 1 | 2 | 3 | Result | 1 | 2 | 3 | Result | Total |
|---|---|---|---|---|---|---|---|---|---|---|---|---|
| 1st place, gold medalist(s) | Maiya Maneza (KAZ) | A | 62.82 | 103 | ~~106~~ | 106 | 106 | 133 | ~~135~~ | 135 | 135 | 241 |
| 2nd place, silver medalist(s) | Kim Soo-kyung (KOR) | A | 62.79 | 100 | 105 | 107 | 107 | 125 | 130 | 133 | 133 | 240 |
| 3rd place, bronze medalist(s) | Chen Aichan (CHN) | A | 62.47 | ~~105~~ | 105 | 108 | 108 | 125 | ~~130~~ | ~~131~~ | 125 | 233 |
| 4 | Mun Yu-ra (KOR) | A | 62.68 | 100 | 104 | ~~107~~ | 104 | 125 | ~~130~~ | ~~130~~ | 125 | 229 |
| 5 | O Jong-ae (PRK) | A | 61.29 | 92 | ~~97~~ | ~~97~~ | 92 | 120 | 125 | 130 | 130 | 222 |
| 6 | Namkhaidorjiin Bayarmaa (MGL) | A | 61.89 | 85 | 88 | 91 | 91 | 113 | 118 | 121 | 121 | 212 |
