= Weightlifting at the 2011 Pan American Games – Women's 63 kg =

Weightlifting – Women's 63 kg at the 2011 Pan American Games
- Venue: Weightlifting Forum
- Dates: October 25
- Competitors: 6 from 6 nations

Medalists
Gold medal	Christine Girard	Canada
Silver medal	Nisida Palomeque	Colombia
Bronze medal	Luz Acosta	Mexico

The women's 63 kg competition of the weightlifting events at the 2011 Pan American Games in Guadalajara, Mexico, was held on October 25 at the Weightlifting Forum. The defending champion was Leydi Solís from Colombia.

Each lifter performed in both the snatch and clean and jerk lifts, with the final score being the sum of the lifter's best result in each. The athlete received three attempts in each of the two lifts; the score for the lift was the heaviest weight successfully lifted. This weightlifting event was the fourth lightest women's event at the weightlifting competition, limiting competitors to a maximum of 63 kilograms of body mass.

== Schedule ==
All times are Central Standard Time (UTC-6).

Date	Time	Round
October 25, 2011	14:00	Final

== Results ==
6 athletes from 6 countries took part.

- PR – Pan American Games record

Rank	Name	Country	Group	B.weight (kg)	Snatch (kg)	Clean & Jerk (kg)	Total (kg)
1st place, gold medalist(s)	Christine Girard	Canada	A	62.90	106 PR	132	238 PR
2nd place, silver medalist(s)	Nisida Palomeque	Colombia	A	62.09	100	135 PR	235
3rd place, bronze medalist(s)	Luz Acosta	Mexico	A	62.28	105	125	230
4	Leslie Armijo	Chile	A	61.86	90	111	201
5	Martha Malla	Ecuador	A	62.66	85	110	195
6	Silvana Saldarriaga	Peru	A	60.23	74	100	174

== New records ==
The following records were established and improved upon during the competition.

Snatch	101.0 kg	Christine Girard (CAN)	PR
Snatch	103.0 kg	Luz Acosta (MEX)	PR
Snatch	104.0 kg	Christine Girard (CAN)	PR
Snatch	105.0 kg	Luz Acosta (MEX)	PR
Snatch	106.0 kg	Christine Girard (CAN)	PR
Clean & Jerk	129.0 kg	Christine Girard (CAN)	PR
Clean & Jerk	130.0 kg	Nísida Palomeque (COL)	PR
Clean & Jerk	132.0 kg	Christine Girard (CAN)	PR
Clean & Jerk	135.0 kg	Nísida Palomeque (COL)	PR
Total	225.0 kg	Luz Acosta (MEX)	PR
Total	231.0 kg	Christine Girard (CAN)	PR
Total	235.0 kg	Christine Girard (CAN)	PR
Total	238.0 kg	Christine Girard (CAN)	PR
