= Marie Fegue =

Cameroonian-French weightlifter (born 1991)

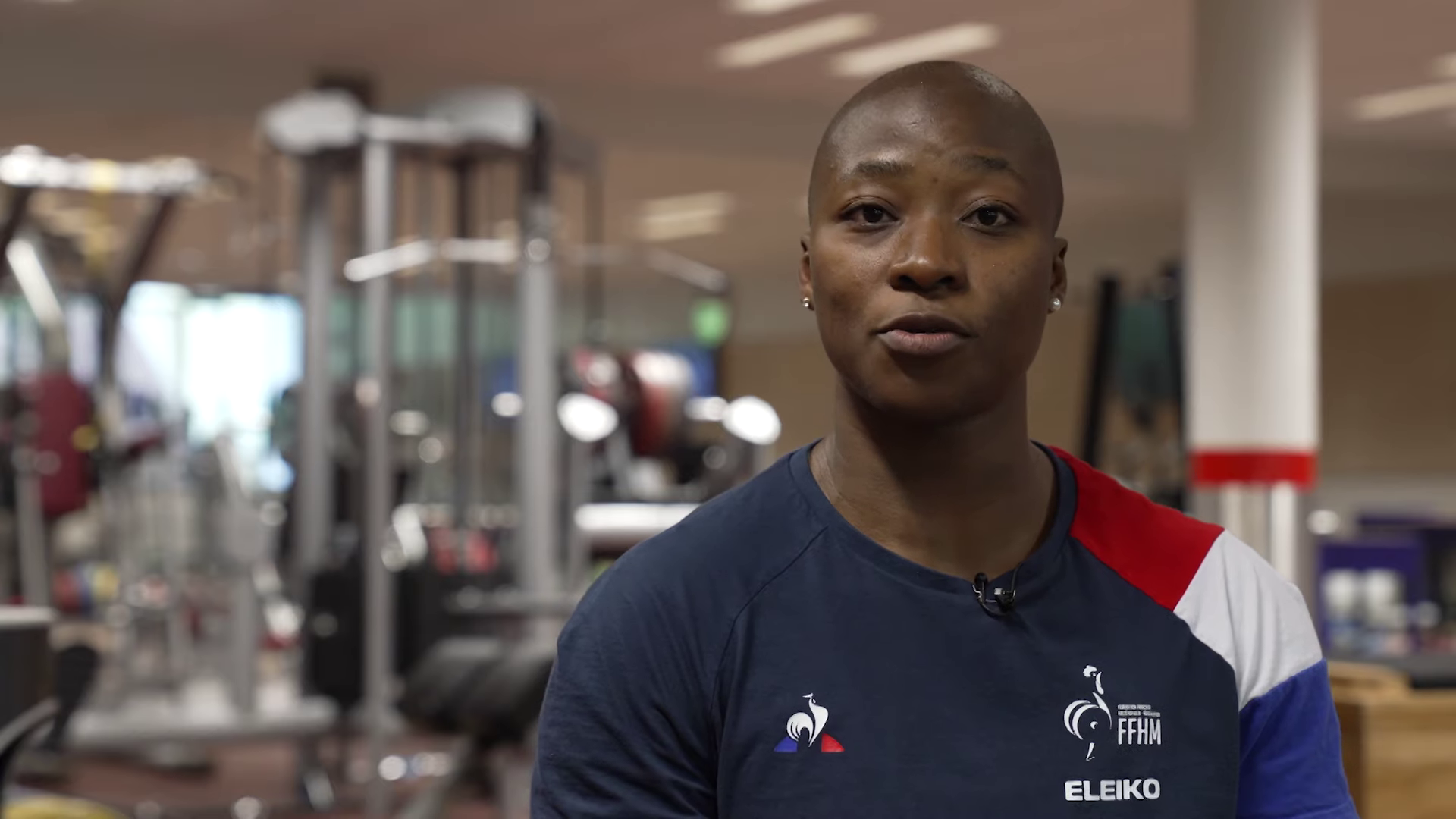
- Marie-Josèphe Fegue in 2024

Personal information
- Full name: Marie Josèphe Fegue
- Nationality: Cameroonian; French
- Born: 28 May 1991 (age 35) Yaoundé, Cameroon
- Height: 1.65 m (5 ft 5 in)
- Weight: 68 kg (150 lb)

Sport
- Sport: Weightlifting
- Event: 69 kg
Medal record
Women's weightlifting
Representing France
European Championships
Gold medal – first place	2022 Tirana	76 kg
Gold medal – first place	2023 Yerevan	76 kg
Representing Cameroon
African Championships
Gold medal – first place	2013 Casablanca	69 kg
Silver medal – second place	2012 Nairobi	63 kg
Commonwealth Games
Gold medal – first place	2014 Glasgow	69 kg
Bronze medal – third place	2010 Delhi	63 kg

Marie Josèphe Fegue (born 28 May 1991) is a Cameroonian-French weightlifter.

== Career ==
She competed in the women's 69 kg event at the 2014 Commonwealth Games where she won a gold medal. She competed at world championships.

In 2024, she competed in the women's 71 kg event at the Summer Olympics held in Paris, France. She lifted 243 kg in total and placed fifth.

== Major results ==
Year	Venue	Weight	Snatch (kg)				Clean & Jerk (kg)				Total	Rank
Year	Venue	Weight	1	2	3	Rank	1	2	3	Rank	Total	Rank
Olympic Games
2024	Paris, France	71 kg	~~110~~	110	~~114~~	—N/a	~~132~~	133	~~138~~	—N/a	243	5
World Championships
2009	Goyang, South Korea	63 kg	~~80~~	~~80~~	~~82~~	—	95	~~100~~	102	21	—	—
2010	Antalya, Turkey	63 kg	80	85	~~90~~	20	100	105	~~110~~	22	190	20
2022	Bogotá, Colombia	71 kg	105	110	~~114~~	6	131	~~136~~	~~137~~	8	241	8
European Championships
2022	Tirana, Albania	76 kg	105	110	~~113~~	1st place, gold medalist(s)	126	130	135	1st place, gold medalist(s)	245	1st place, gold medalist(s)
2023	Yerevan, Armenia	76 kg	~~108~~	108	113	1st place, gold medalist(s)	130	135	140	1st place, gold medalist(s)	253	1st place, gold medalist(s)
African Championships
2010	Yaoundé, Cameroon	69 kg	~~85~~	~~85~~	~~87~~	—	105	110	~~115~~	2nd place, silver medalist(s)	—	—
2012	Nairobi, Kenya	63 kg	85	~~91~~	92	2nd place, silver medalist(s)	105	110	–	2nd place, silver medalist(s)	202	2nd place, silver medalist(s)
2013	Casablanca, Morocco	69 kg	93	98	103	1st place, gold medalist(s)	116	120	128	1st place, gold medalist(s)	231	1st place, gold medalist(s)
