= Weightlifting at the 2010 Commonwealth Games – Women's 69 kg =

The women's 69 kg weightlifting event was an event at the weightlifting competition, limiting competitors to a maximum of 69 kilograms of body mass. The competition took place on 8 October. The weightlifter from Canada won the gold, with a combined lift of 235 kg.

== Results ==
Rank	Name	Country	B.weight (kg)	Snatch (kg)	Clean & Jerk (kg)	Total (kg)
1st place, gold medalist(s)	Christine Girard	Canada	68.89	105	130	235
2nd place, silver medalist(s)	Janet Georges	Seychelles	68.34	100	116	216
3rd place, bronze medalist(s)	Itohan Ebireguesele	Nigeria	68.40	95	120	215
4	Marie-Josée Arès-Pilon	Canada	67.02	92	115	207
5	Mercy Obiero	Kenya	67.44	80	110	190
6	Belinda van Tienen	Australia	68.82	83	110	190
7	Guba Hale	Papua New Guinea	68.16	80	100	180
8	Nor Abdul Halim	Malaysia	67.85	75	96	171
9	Dora Abotsi	Ghana	67.03	76	93	169
10	Prossy Nyanga	Uganda	68.01	75	90	165
11	Kerri Wotenick	England	68.01	75	90	165
–	Natasha Perdue	Wales	67.61	–	–	DNF

== See also ==
- 2010 Commonwealth Games
- Weightlifting at the 2010 Commonwealth Games
