= Weightlifting at the 2002 Commonwealth Games – Women's 75 kg =

Weightlifting – Women's 75 kg at the 2002 Commonwealth Games
- Venue: Manchester International Convention Centre
- Dates: 3 August 2002
- Competitors: 6 from 5 nations
- Winning total weight: 222.5

Medalists
gold medal	Shailaja Pujari	India
silver medal	Deborah Lovely	Australia
bronze medal	Saree Williams	Australia

The Women's 75 kg weightlifting event at the 2002 Commonwealth Games took place at the Manchester International Convention Centre on 3 August 2002.The weightlifter from India won the gold, with a combined lift of 222.5 kg.

== Schedule ==
All times are Coordinated Universal Time (UTC)

Date	Time	Event
3 August 2002	15:00	Group A

== Records ==
Prior to this competition, the existing world, Commonwealth and Games records were as follows:

World record	Snatch	Tang Weifang (CHN)	116.0 kg	Wuhan, China	3 September 1999
World record	Clean & Jerk	Gyöngyi Likerecz (HUN)	143.0 kg	Havířov, Czech Republic	4 June 2002
World record	Total	Sun Tianni (CHN)	257.5 kg	Osaka, Japan	6 May 2000
Commonwealth record	Snatch				
Commonwealth record	Clean & Jerk	Ruth Ogbeifo (NGR)	140.0 kg	Sydney, Australia	20 September 2000
Commonwealth record	Total	Ruth Ogbeifo (NGR)	245.0 kg	Sydney, Australia	20 September 2000
Games record	Snatch	First time held			
Games record	Clean & Jerk	First time held			
Games record	Total	First time held			

The following records were established during the competition:

Snatch	97.5 kg	Shailaja Pujari (IND)	GR
Clean & Jerk	125.0 kg	Shailaja Pujari (IND)	GR
Total	222.5 kg	Shailaja Pujari (IND)	GR

== Results ==
Rank	Athlete	Nation	Group	Body weight	Snatch (kg)					Clean & Jerk (kg)					Total
Rank	Athlete	Nation	Group	Body weight	1	2	3	Result	Rank	1	2	3	Result	Rank	Total
1st place, gold medalist(s)	Shailaja Pujari	India	A	—	92.5	97.5	~~102.5~~	97.5	1st place, gold medalist(s)	115.0	125.0	~~132.5~~	125.0	1st place, gold medalist(s)	222.5
2nd place, silver medalist(s)	Deborah Lovely	Australia	A	—	85.0	90.0	95.0	95.0	2nd place, silver medalist(s)	102.5	107.5	~~110.0~~	107.5	2nd place, silver medalist(s)	202.5
3rd place, bronze medalist(s)	Saree Williams	Australia	A	—	80.0	82.5	~~85.0~~	82.5	3rd place, bronze medalist(s)	95.0	100.0	~~102.5~~	100.0	4	182.5
4	Mary Diranga	Nauru	A	—	75.0	80.0	~~85.0~~	80.0	4	102.5	~~107.5~~	~~107.5~~	102.5	3rd place, bronze medalist(s)	182.5
5	Hortense Nguidjol	Cameroon	A	—	~~62.5~~	~~65.0~~	65.0	65.0	5	85.0	90.0	~~92.5~~	90.0	6	155.0
–	Rachel Clark	England	A	—	~~80.0~~	~~80.0~~	~~80.0~~	–	–	92.5	~~97.5~~	97.5	97.5	5	–
