= Neslihan Okumuş =

Turkish weightlifter

Personal information
- Full name: Neslihan Okumus
- Born: 17 September 1994 (age 31)
- Weight: 62.91 kg (138.7 lb)

Sport
- Country: Turkey
- Sport: Weightlifting
- Team: National team
- Updated on 6 September 2016

Neslihan Okumus (born 17 September 1994) is a Turkish weightlifter who competes in the 63 kg category and represents Turkey at international competitions.

She competed at the 2010 Summer Youth Olympics. She competed at world championships, at the 2011 World Weightlifting Championships.

== Major results ==
Year	Venue	Weight	Snatch (kg)				Clean & Jerk (kg)				Total	Rank
Year	Venue	Weight	1	2	3	Rank	1	2	3	Rank	Total	Rank
World Championships
2011	Paris, France	63 kg	85	88	~~91~~	20	105	110	114	16	202	16
