= Belinda van Tienen =

Australian weightlifter

Personal information
- Full name: Belinda Van Tienen
- Born: 4 November 1986 (age 39)
- Weight: 68.82 kg (151.7 lb)

Sport
- Country: Australia
- Sport: Weightlifting
- Weight class: 69 kg
- Team: National team
- Updated on 11 October 2016

Belinda Van Tienen (born 4 November 1986) is an Australian female weightlifter, competing in the 69 kg category and representing Australia at international competitions. She participated at the 2010 Commonwealth Games in the 69 kg event.

== Major competitions ==
Year	Venue	Weight	Snatch (kg)				Clean & Jerk (kg)				Total	Rank
Year	Venue	Weight	1	2	3	Rank	1	2	3	Rank	Total	Rank
Commonwealth Games
2010	(Indonesia) Delhi, India	69 kg	83	~~86~~	~~86~~	—N/a	104	~~107~~	~~107~~	—N/a	187	6
