= Weightlifting at the 2006 Commonwealth Games – Men's 56 kg =

Weightlifting – Men's 56 kg at the 2006 Commonwealth Games
- Venue: Melbourne Exhibition Centre
- Dates: 16 March 2006
- Competitors: 16 from 12 nations
- Winning total weight: 255

Medalists
| gold medal | Mohamed Faizal Baharom | Malaysia |
| silver medal | Vicky Batta | India |
| bronze medal | Matin Guntali | Malaysia |

The Men's 56 kg weightlifting event at the 2006 Commonwealth Games took place at the Melbourne Exhibition Centre on 16 March 2006. The weightlifter from Malaysia won the gold, lifting a total weight of 255 kg.

Amirul Hamizan Ibrahim was the defending champion, but was unable to defend the title due to a two-year doping ban.

== Schedule ==
All times are Australian Eastern Standard Time (UTC+10)

| Date | Time | Event |
|---|---|---|
| 16 March 2006 | 18:30 | Group A |

== Records ==
Prior to this competition, the existing world, Commonwealth and Games records were as follows:

| World record | Snatch | Halil Mutlu (TUR) | 138 kg | Antalya, Turkey | 4 November 2001 |
| World record | Clean & Jerk | Halil Mutlu (TUR) | 168 kg | Trenčín, Slovakia | 24 April 2001 |
| World record | Total | Halil Mutlu (TUR) | 305 kg | Sydney, Australia | 16 September 2000 |
| Commonwealth record | Snatch | | | | |
| Commonwealth record | Clean & Jerk | Arumugam Pandian (IND) | 147 kg | Vishakapatnam, India | 17 January 2001 |
| Commonwealth record | Total | | | | |
| Games record | Snatch | Amirul Hamizan Ibrahim (MAS) | 115 kg | Manchester, England | 30 July 2002 |
| Games record | Clean & Jerk | Amirul Hamizan Ibrahim (MAS) | 145 kg | Manchester, England | 30 July 2002 |
| Games record | Total | Amirul Hamizan Ibrahim (MAS) | 260 kg | Manchester, England | 30 July 2002 |

== Results ==
| Rank | Athlete | Nation | Group | Body weight | Snatch (kg) | | | | Clean & Jerk (kg) | | | | Total |
| Rank | Athlete | Nation | Group | Body weight | 1 | 2 | 3 | Result | 1 | 2 | 3 | Result | Total |
|---|---|---|---|---|---|---|---|---|---|---|---|---|---|
| 1st place, gold medalist(s) | Mohamed Faizal Baharom | Malaysia | A | 55.53 | ~~110~~ | 110 | 115 | 115 | 135 | 140 | ~~146~~ | 140 | 255 |
| 2nd place, silver medalist(s) | Vicky Batta | India | A | 55.94 | 110 | ~~114~~ | 114 | 114 | 131 | ~~136~~ | ~~136~~ | 131 | 245 |
| 3rd place, bronze medalist(s) | Matin Guntali | Malaysia | A | 55.49 | 102 | 105 | 107 | 107 | 131 | ~~138~~ | ~~138~~ | 131 | 238 |
| 4 | Raju Edwin | India | A | 55.69 | 101 | ~~105~~ | 105 | 105 | ~~130~~ | 130 | ~~136~~ | 130 | 235 |
| 5 | Daniel Koum | Cameroon | A | 55.61 | ~~102~~ | ~~105~~ | 106 | 106 | 125 | ~~132~~ | ~~132~~ | 125 | 231 |
| 6 | Nayden Rusev | Cyprus | A | 55.78 | 96 | ~~101~~ | ~~103~~ | 96 | 120 | 126 | – | 126 | 222 |
| 7 | Starron Dowabobo | Nauru | A | 55.76 | 95 | ~~100~~ | ~~100~~ | 95 | 120 | 125 | ~~127~~ | 125 | 220 |
| 8 | Mubarak Kivumbi | Uganda | A | 55.86 | 90 | ~~93~~ | 93 | 93 | 120 | ~~125~~ | 125 | 125 | 218 |
| 9 | Akramul Haque | Bangladesh | A | 55.89 | ~~98~~ | 98 | ~~103~~ | 98 | 115 | 120 | ~~123~~ | 120 | 218 |
| 10 | Obrie Nondo | Zambia | A | 55.34 | 90 | ~~95~~ | 95 | 95 | 115 | 120 | ~~123~~ | 120 | 215 |
| 11 | Alphonso Adonis | South Africa | A | 55.86 | 90 | 95 | ~~100~~ | 95 | 110 | 115 | 117 | 117 | 212 |
| 12 | Ismail Katamba | Uganda | A | 55.41 | 90 | ~~95~~ | ~~95~~ | 90 | 120 | ~~125~~ | ~~125~~ | 120 | 210 |
| 13 | Joe Namuno | Papua New Guinea | A | 55.50 | 80 | 85 | ~~90~~ | 85 | 105 | ~~110~~ | 110 | 110 | 195 |
| 14 | Leo Kivavie | Papua New Guinea | A | 55.43 | 75 | 80 | ~~85~~ | 80 | 100 | ~~105~~ | ~~108~~ | 100 | 180 |
| 15 | Relebohile Motjamela | Lesotho | A | 55.16 | ~~60~~ | 60 | 75 | 75 | 80 | ~~95~~ | ~~95~~ | 80 | 155 |
| – | Emil Nishantha | Sri Lanka | A | 55.85 | 95 | ~~102~~ | ~~102~~ | 95 | ~~120~~ | ~~125~~ | ~~135~~ | – | – |
