= Jacquie White =

Australian weightlifter

Personal information
- Full name: Jacqueline Louise White
- Born: 23 February 1982 (age 44)
- Weight: 62.39 kg (137.5 lb)

Sport
- Country: Australia
- Sport: Weightlifting
- Team: National team
- Updated on 4 September 2016

Jacqueline Louise "Jacquie" White (born 23 February 1982) is an Australian female weightlifter, competing in the 63 kg category and representing Australia at international competitions. She competed at world championships, most recently at the 2014 World Weightlifting Championships.

== Major results ==
Year	Venue	Weight	Snatch (kg)				Clean & Jerk (kg)				Total	Rank
Year	Venue	Weight	1	2	3	Rank	1	2	3	Rank	Total	Rank
World Championships
2014	Almaty, Kazakhstan	63 kg	69	71	73	37	80	---	---	38	153	37
2007	Chiang Mai, Thailand	63 kg	83	~~86~~	~~86~~	27	~~98~~	98	~~102~~	29	181	26
2006	Santo Domingo, Dominican Republic	63 kg	80	~~83~~	83	21	93	97	~~100~~	23	180.0	22
2003	Vancouver, Canada	63 kg	75	80	~~82.5~~	33	~~95~~	95	~~100~~	34	175	34
