= Chen Aichan =

Chinese weightlifter (born 1988)

Personal information
- Nationality: China
- Born: 8 August 1988 (age 37)
- Height: 1.65 m (5 ft 5 in)

Sport
- Sport: Weightlifting
- Event: 63 kg
Medal record
Women's weightlifting
Asian Games
Bronze medal – third place	2010 Guangzhou	63 kg

Chen Aichan (Chinese: 陈爱婵; pinyin: Chén Aì Chán; born August 8, 1988, at Guangzhou) is a Chinese weightlifter. She won a bronze medal for the 63 kg class at the 2010 Asian Games in Guangzhou, China, with a total of 233 kilograms. Chen raised in a peasant family in Hengli Town, Nansha District, Guangzhou. She won the 2010 Female Weightlifting National Championship and was selected into national weightlifting team.
