= 2010 World Weightlifting Championships – Women's 63 kg =

The women's competition in the middleweight (– 63 kg) division was held on 20 September 2010.

== Schedule ==
Date	Time	Event
20 September 2010	15:00	Group C
20 September 2010	17:30	Group B
20 September 2010	20:00	Group A

== Medalists ==
Event	Gold		Silver		Bronze	
Snatch	Ouyang Xiaofang (CHN)	112 kg	Sibel Şimşek (TUR)	111 kg	Kim Soo-kyung (KOR)	107 kg
Clean & Jerk	Maiya Maneza (KAZ)	143 kg	Nísida Palomeque (COL)	134 kg	O Jong-ae (PRK)	130 kg
Total	Maiya Maneza (KAZ)	248 kg	Sibel Şimşek (TUR)	241 kg	Ouyang Xiaofang (CHN)	241 kg

== Records ==
Prior to this competition, the existing world records were as follows.

World Record	Snatch	Pawina Thongsuk (THA)	116 kg	Doha, Qatar	12 November 2005
World Record	Clean & Jerk	Pawina Thongsuk (THA)	142 kg	Doha, Qatar	4 December 2006
World Record	Total	Liu Haixia (CHN)	257 kg	Chiang Mai, Thailand	23 September 2007

== Results ==
Rank	Athlete	Group	Body weight	Snatch (kg)				Clean & Jerk (kg)				Total
Rank	Athlete	Group	Body weight	1	2	3	Rank	1	2	3	Rank	Total
1st place, gold medalist(s)	Maiya Maneza (KAZ)	A	62.35	~~105~~	~~105~~	105	4	136	143	—	1st place, gold medalist(s)	248
2nd place, silver medalist(s)	Sibel Şimşek (TUR)	A	62.43	108	~~111~~	111	2nd place, silver medalist(s)	130	~~135~~	~~136~~	4	241
3rd place, bronze medalist(s)	Ouyang Xiaofang (CHN)	A	62.59	105	108	112	1st place, gold medalist(s)	123	126	129	5	241
4	Nísida Palomeque (COL)	A	62.12	97	101	103	6	128	132	134	2nd place, silver medalist(s)	237
5	Kim Soo-kyung (KOR)	A	62.92	100	105	107	3rd place, bronze medalist(s)	128	~~133~~	~~133~~	6	235
6	Rim Jong-sim (PRK)	A	62.49	100	104	~~107~~	5	127	~~130~~	~~130~~	7	231
7	O Jong-ae (PRK)	A	60.22	97	~~101~~	~~101~~	11	130	~~133~~	~~133~~	3rd place, bronze medalist(s)	227
8	Mercedes Pérez (COL)	B	62.96	95	99	~~101~~	10	~~125~~	125	~~130~~	9	224
9	Liu Xia (MAC)	B	62.62	95	~~99~~	~~99~~	13	~~125~~	125	~~130~~	8	220
10	Hanna Batsiushka (BLR)	A	62.33	101	~~105~~	~~105~~	7	115	~~119~~	~~119~~	12	216
11	Kristine Petrosyan (ARM)	B	62.65	93	96	100	9	114	~~120~~	~~120~~	13	214
12	Natalie Burgener (USA)	B	62.82	93	96	~~98~~	12	105	110	114	14	210
13	Nikoletta Nagy (HUN)	C	62.61	85	88	91	14	110	115	118	10	209
14	Lenka Orságová (CZE)	B	62.99	~~90~~	90	~~93~~	17	~~114~~	114	117	11	207
15	Mayu Hashida (JPN)	C	59.69	86	89	90	15	108	~~111~~	113	15	203
16	Maria Zubova (RUS)	C	62.44	83	87	90	16	105	110	~~113~~	16	200
17	Muslime Meral-Sunar (FRA)	B	62.78	87	~~91~~	~~91~~	18	108	~~111~~	~~111~~	18	195
18	Sheila Ramos (ESP)	B	62.75	~~83~~	~~83~~	83	20	~~105~~	105	110	17	193
19	Andreea Marcovici (ROU)	C	62.61	78	83	~~85~~	19	97	103	~~108~~	20	186
20	Silvana Vukas (SRB)	C	61.96	76	78	~~80~~	21	102	~~105~~	~~105~~	21	180
21	Maria Panagiotidou (GRE)	C	62.98	~~73~~	73	~~76~~	22	90	93	~~95~~	22	166
22	Carita Hansson (SWE)	C	61.45	72	~~76~~	~~76~~	23	88	~~91~~	~~91~~	23	160
—	Roxana Cocoș (ROU)	A	62.94	98	101	~~103~~	8	~~130~~	~~130~~	—	—	—
—	Dominika Misterska (POL)	C	61.34	~~82~~	~~83~~	~~83~~	—	105	~~108~~	~~108~~	19	—
—	Ruth Kasirye (NOR)	A	62.91	~~100~~	~~100~~	~~100~~	—	~~120~~	—	—	—	—
—	Namkhaidorjiin Bayarmaa (MGL)	B	61.59	86	~~91~~	~~91~~	—	~~111~~	111	~~118~~	—	—
—	Marie Fegue (CMR)	C	62.28	80	85	~~90~~	—	100	105	~~110~~	—	—
—	Geralee Vega (PUR)	C	60.53	82	~~87~~	~~87~~	—	100	105	~~110~~	—	—
—	Darkhanbaataryn Ichinnorov (MGL)	C	62.98	~~83~~	83	~~85~~	—	~~103~~	~~103~~	~~103~~	—	—
DQ	Leila Lassouani (FRA)	B	62.62	85	88	~~91~~	—	113	119	~~122~~	—	—

== New records ==
Clean & Jerk	143 kg	Maiya Maneza (KAZ)	WR
