= Weightlifting at the 2012 Summer Olympics – Women's 63 kg =

Women's 63 kg at the Games of the XXX Olympiad
- Venue: ExCeL London
- Date: 31 July 2012
- Competitors: 10 from 10 nations

Medalists
1st place, gold medalist(s)		Christine Girard	Canada
2nd place, silver medalist(s)		Milka Maneva	Bulgaria
3rd place, bronze medalist(s)		Luz Acosta	Mexico

The women's 63 kilograms weightlifting event at the 2012 Summer Olympics in London, United Kingdom, took place at ExCeL London.

== Summary ==
Total score was the sum of the lifter's best result in each of the snatch and the clean and jerk, with three lifts allowed for each lift. In case of a tie, the lighter lifter won; if still tied, the lifter who took the fewest attempts to achieve the total score won. Lifters without a valid snatch score did not perform the clean and jerk.

On 15 June 2016, it was announced that gold medalist Maiya Maneza had tested positive for performance-enhancing drugs at the 2012 Olympic competition. On 27 July 2016, the IWF reported in the second wave of re-sampling that silver medalist Svetlana Tsarukaeva had tested positive for the steroid dehydrochlormethyltestosterone. On 5 April 2017 it was announced that as a result of retesting samples she had been disqualified for a drug violation, and her silver medal withdrawn.

== Schedule ==
All times are British Summer Time (UTC+01:00)

Date	Time	Event
31 July 2012	15:30	Group A

== Records ==
Prior to this competition, the existing world and Olympic records were as follows.

World Record	Snatch	Svetlana Tsarukaeva (RUS)	117 kg	Paris, France	8 November 2011
World Record	Clean & Jerk	Maiya Maneza (KAZ)	143 kg	Antalya, Turkey	20 September 2010
World Record	Total	Liu Haixia (CHN)	257 kg	Chiang Mai, Thailand	23 September 2007
Olympic Record	Snatch	Hanna Batsiushka (BLR)	115 kg	Athens, Greece	18 August 2004
Olympic Record	Clean & Jerk	Nataliya Skakun (UKR)	135 kg	Athens, Greece	18 August 2004
Olympic Record	Total	Chen Xiaomin (CHN)	242 kg	Sydney, Australia	19 September 2000

== Results ==
Rank	Athlete	Group	Body weight	Snatch (kg)				Clean & Jerk (kg)				Total
Rank	Athlete	Group	Body weight	1	2	3	Result	1	2	3	Result	Total
1st place, gold medalist(s)	Christine Girard (CAN)	A	62.87	103	~~105~~	~~105~~	103	130	133	~~135~~	133	236
2nd place, silver medalist(s)	Milka Maneva (BUL)	A	62.66	98	102	~~105~~	102	125	131	~~134~~	131	233
3rd place, bronze medalist(s)	Luz Acosta (MEX)	A	62.91	99	~~103~~	~~104~~	99	119	125	~~127~~	125	224
4	Seen Lee (AUS)	A	59.65	78	83	~~86~~	83	98	103	~~106~~	103	186
5	Maria Liku (FIJ)	A	61.45	78	82	~~85~~	82	100	~~105~~	~~105~~	100	182
6	Lucía Castañeda (NCA)	A	62.45	76	~~79~~	79	79	91	~~97~~	97	97	176
7	Silvana Saldarriaga (PER)	A	58.11	70	~~75~~	75	75	92	97	~~101~~	97	172
DQ	Maiya Maneza (KAZ)	A	62.21	106	110	~~112~~	110	135	~~144~~	~~144~~	135	~~245~~
DQ	Svetlana Tsarukaeva (RUS)	A	62.42	106	~~111~~	112	112	125	~~130~~	~~130~~	125	~~237~~
DQ	Sibel Şimşek (TUR)	A	62.28	~~105~~	~~105~~	105	105	130	~~133~~	~~133~~	130	~~235~~

== New records ==
Total	~~245 kg~~	~~Maiya Maneza (KAZ)~~	~~OR~~
