= Carissa Gump =

American weightlifter (born 1983)

Personal information
- Nationality: United States
- Born: 24 August 1983 (age 42) Kingston, New York
- Height: 1.55 m (5 ft 1 in)
- Weight: 63 kg (139 lb)

Sport
- Sport: Weightlifting
- Event: 63 kg
- Coached by: Chris Polakowski

Carissa Gump (née Gordon) (born August 24, 1983, in Stone Ridge, New York) is an American weightlifter. She is a multiple-time American record holder, a five-time consecutive American Open champion (2002–2006), and a resident athlete of the U.S. Olympic Training Center in Colorado Springs, Colorado. She is also the wife of Jason Gump, a competitive weightlifter who placed fifth for the 94 kg class at the 2003 Pan American Games in Santo Domingo, Dominican Republic.

== Education ==
Carissa holds a B.S. in business with an emphasis in Sport Management from the University of Colorado Colorado Springs and was the first Olympian to graduate from their College of Business Sport Management Program. She also holds a Masters in Public Administration with an emphasis in Non-Profit Management from Keller Graduate School of Management graduating with distinction.

== Career ==
Gump represented the United States at the 2008 Summer Olympics in Beijing, where she competed for the women's middleweight category (63 kg), along with her teammate Natalie Woolfolk. Gump placed fourteenth in this event, as she successfully lifted 88 kg in the single-motion snatch, and hoisted 116 kg in the two-part, shoulder-to-overhead clean and jerk, for a total of 204 kg.

Carissa Gump has previously worked for the U.S. Olympic Committee, USA Weightlifting as their Associate Executive Director for Business & Development and serving as the USA Weightlifting Foundation Executive Director. She currently is employed with the National Strength and Conditioning Association Foundation and serves as their first ever executive director. Her professional experience includes management of fundraising, sponsorship, marketing, events, communications, digital media, and membership management. She also runs her own consulting business to support nonprofit organizations that include USA Weightlifting, Wrestle Like a Girl and Beat the Streets DC.

She has also served in a variety of elected leadership positions:

Aunt Dot's Place(Food Pantry), board member, 2020-Current

USA Weightlifting Foundation, board member, 2020-Current

Southern Colorado Association of Fundraising Professionals, Board Member 2017-2019

Colorado Olympians Association, Vice President, 2016-2019

USA Weightlifting Athlete Advisory Council, Member, 2009-2011

USA Weightlifting Judicial Committee, Member, 2016-2018

Security Public Library-Friends of the Library, Vice President, 2017-2018

USA Weightlifting Coaching Education Committee, Member, 2009-2011

USA Weightlifting Technical Committee, Member, 2006–2009, 2017-2018

USA Weightlifting Team Leader Committee, Member, 2006-2009

Olympic Training Center Resident Committee, Member, 2001-2003

USA Weightlifting Board of Governors, Delegate, 2001-2009

== Personal life ==
She currently resides in Essex, Vermont with her daughter Camille and son Alexander.
