= Silvana Saldarriaga =

Peruvian weightlifter

Personal information
- Born: March 13, 1993 (age 32)
- Height: 1.55 m (5 ft 1 in)
- Weight: 58 kg (128 lb)

Sport
- Country: Peru
- Sport: Weightlifting

Silvana Saldarriaga (born 13 March 1993) is a Peruvian weightlifter. She competed at the 2012 Summer Olympics in the Women's 63 kg, finishing in last place.
