= Sibel Şimşek =

Turkish weightlifter (born 1984)

Personal information
- Nationality: Turkey
- Born: 10 October 1984 (age 41) Osmancık, Çorum Province, Turkey
- Height: 1.68 m (5 ft 6 in)
- Weight: 63 kg (139 lb)

Sport
- Country: Turkey
- Sport: Weightlifting
- Event: –63 kg
- Club: Kocaeli Büyükşehir Belediyesi Kağıt Spor Kulübü
- Coached by: Mehmet Üstündağ
Medal record
World Championships
| Silver medal – second place | 2010 Antalya | 63 kg |
| Bronze medal – third place | 2009 Goyang | 63 kg |
European Championships
| Gold medal – first place | 2004 Kyiv | 69 kg |
| Gold medal – first place | 2009 Bucharest | 63 kg |
| Gold medal – first place | 2010 Minsk | 63 kg |
| Gold medal – first place | 2012 Antalya | 63 kg |
| Silver medal – second place | 2007 Strasbourg | 63 kg |
| Silver medal – second place | 2008 Lignano | 63 kg |
| Bronze medal – third place | 2011 Kazan | 63 kg |
Mediterranean Games
| Gold medal – first place | 2013 Mersin | 63 kg S |
| Silver medal – second place | 2009 Pescara | 63 kg S |
| Silver medal – second place | 2009 Pescara | 63 kg C |
| Silver medal – second place | 2013 Mersin | 63 kg C |

Sibel Şimşek (pronounced [ˈsiːbel ˈʃiːmʃec]; born 10 October 1984) is a Turkish weightlifter who competed in the women's 63 kg and 69 kg categories. She is a multiple European champion and World Championships medalist representing Turkey. Şimşek represented the club Kocaeli Büyükşehir Belediyesi Kağıt Spor Kulübü and was coached by Mehmet Üstündağ.

== Career ==
Şimşek made her international breakthrough by winning the gold medal in the 69 kg category at the 2004 European Championships in Kyiv, lifting 247.5 kg in total. She went on to compete at the 2004 Athens Olympics, but failed all three snatch attempts.

She won silver at the 2007 European Championships in Strasbourg with a 215 kg total, and another silver at the 2008 Championships in Lignano Sabbiadoro (226 kg). In 2009, Şimşek became European Champion again in Bucharest with 236 kg and later earned a bronze medal at the 2009 World Weightlifting Championships in Goyang (243 kg).

At the 2010 European Weightlifting Championships in Minsk, she defended her European title with a 244 kg total (110 kg snatch, 134 kg clean & jerk), and the same year won the silver medal at the 2010 World Weightlifting Championships in Antalya (241 kg). She later captured her fourth European title at the 2012 European Weightlifting Championships in Antalya, lifting a total of 225 kg.

Şimşek competed at the 2012 London Olympics, initially finishing fourth with a 235 kg total, but was later disqualified after a re-analysis of her doping test returned positive in 2017.

== Disqualification ==
On 12 January 2017, the International Olympic Committee (IOC) announced that Şimşek was disqualified from the 2012 Summer Olympics after testing positive for a banned substance during a re-analysis of stored samples. Her results from the London Olympics were annulled, and the medals were reallocated.

== Major results ==
| Year | Venue | Event | Snatch (kg) | Clean & Jerk (kg) | Total (kg) | Rank |
Olympic Games
| 2004 | Athens, Greece | 69 kg | x | x | x | DSQ |
| 2012 | London, United Kingdom | 63 kg | 105 | 130 | 235 | DSQ |
World Championships
| 2009 | Goyang, South Korea | 63 kg | 108 | 135 | 243 | 3rd place, bronze medalist(s) |
| 2010 | Antalya, Turkey | 63 kg | 111 | 130 | 241 | 2nd place, silver medalist(s) |
European Championships
| 2004 | Kyiv, Ukraine | 69 kg | 112.5 | 135 | 247.5 | 1st place, gold medalist(s) |
| 2007 | Strasbourg, France | 63 kg | 98 | 117 | 215 | 2nd place, silver medalist(s) |
| 2008 | Lignano Sabbiadoro, Italy | 63 kg | 105 | 121 | 226 | 2nd place, silver medalist(s) |
| 2009 | Bucharest, Romania | 63 kg | 108 | 128 | 236 | 1st place, gold medalist(s) |
| 2010 | Minsk, Belarus | 63 kg | 110 | 134 | 244 | 1st place, gold medalist(s) |
| 2011 | Kazan, Russia | 63 kg | 104 | 134 | 238 | 3rd place, bronze medalist(s) |
| 2012 | Antalya, Turkey | 63 kg | 100 | 125 | 225 | 1st place, gold medalist(s) |
Mediterranean Games
| 2009 | Pescara, Italy | 63 kg | 97 | 121 | 218 | 2nd place, silver medalist(s) |
| 2013 | Mersin, Turkey | 63 kg | 102 | 124 | 226 | 1st place, gold medalist(s) |

* DSQ: Disqualified after IOC reanalysis of 2012 samples.
