= Ouyang Xiaofang =

Chinese weightlifter (born 1983)

Medal record

Women's Weightlifting

Representing China

World Championships
Gold medal – first place	2006 Santo Domingo	–63 kg
Bronze medal – third place	2010 Antalya	–63 kg
Bronze medal – third place	2011 Paris	–63 kg

Ouyang Xiaofang (Chinese: 欧阳晓芳; born 5 April 1983) is a weightlifter from Liaoning, People's Republic of China.

Ouyang participated in the women's -63 kg class at the 2006 World Weightlifting Championships and won the gold medal, snatching 110 kg and clean and jerking an additional 136 kg for a total of 246 kg.

At the 2006 Asian Games, she suffered a knee injury, but won the silver medal in the 63 kg category.

== Achievements ==
2006 World Weightlifting Championships, -63 kg
