= Im Jyoung-hwa =

South Korean weightlifter (born 1986)

Medal record

Women's weightlifting

Representing South Korea

Olympic Games
Silver medal – second place	2008 Beijing	48 kg

2005 Busan
Silver medal – second place	2005 Busan	58 kg

Im Jyoung-Hwa (Korean: 임정화; Hanja: 任貞化; born December 7, 1986) is a South Korean weightlifter.

Im was born in Ulsan, South Korea. She won the silver medal at the 2005 Junior World Championships in the 58 kg category, lifting a total of 212 kg.

At the 2007 World Weightlifting Championships she ranked 8th in the 53 kg category.

She participated in the 2008 Olympic Games in Beijing, China, and finished in 4th place in the 48 kg weightclass.
