= 2010 African Weightlifting Championships =

International weightlifting competition

This is a list of results from the 2010 African Weightlifting Championships.

== 56 kg Men ==
Rank	Name	Born	Nation	B.weight	Group	Snatch	CI&Jerk	Total
1	GUGANNOUNI Zied	15.07.1991	TUN	55.97	A	103	128	231
2	LARIKI Elhabib	03.11.1987	ALG	55.71	A	100	128	228
3	AL TUBAL Suhib	01.01.1986	LBA	55.99	A	100	117	217
4	LAFRIK El Mehdi	01.01.1991	MAR	55.51	A	95	115	210
5	PHILLIPS Anrich Morico	17.10.1992	RSA	55.09	A	90	118	208
6	CHIGAR Abdeghani	20.02.1989	MAR	55.53	A	90	116	206
7	MARC Jonathan	13.11.1989	MRI	54.26	A	90	115	205
---	ANDRIANTSITOHAINA Eric Herman	21.07.1991	MAD	54.73	A	85	---	---

== 62 kg Men ==
Rank	Name	Born	Nation	B.weight	Group	Snatch	CI&Jerk	Total
1	BEN SAADA Amor	02.10.1988	TUN	61.78	A	122	140	262
2	SSEKYAAYA Charles	11.04.1994	UGA	61.14	A	100	135	235
3	ADONIS Alphonso	22.01.1986	RSA	61.29	A	103	132	235
4	LABRAK Abdessamad	14.06.1989	MAR	61.84	A	96	125	221
5	ROSE Ian Nigel	21.09.1981	SEY	61.79	A	95	120	215
6	ELFLAH Mohamed	10.10.1993	LBA	61.18	A	90	115	205
7	JOHN Phirl	28.07.1993	MAW	61.24	A	60	87	147
---	NGAMBA Simon	24.12.1982	CMR	61.40	A	---	130	---
DSQ	BELINGA Joseph Ekani	23.06.1989	CMR	60.92	A	---	---	---

== 69 kg Men ==
Rank	Name	Born	Nation	B.weight	Group	Snatch	CI&Jerk	Total
1	VENATIUS Njuh	13.04.1988	CMR	68.43	A	126	155	281
2	JOMNI Hamza	22.01.1989	TUN	67.95	A	122	155	277
3	SHUSHU Otsile Greg	20.08.1980	RSA	68.86	A	121	150	271
4	YANOU KETCHANKE Jean Baptiste	19.07.1993	CMR	68.25	A	125	145	270
5	ETTEIB Abdelilah	11.07.1985	MAR	68.18	A	120	141	261
6	NGWELE Mninikhaya	12.10.1992	RSA	65.79	A	110	125	235
7	ABUBAKER Alhor	01.01.1991	LBA	67.75	A	105	130	235
8	ANDRIA Anare Gaona T.	26.05.1990	MAD	66.67	A	95	126	221
9	THCKO Uauhogwe	07.06.1987	MAW	66.70	A	100	117	217
---	AATAR Abdellatif	26.01.1987	MAR	68.44	A	115	---	---

== 77 kg Men ==
Rank	Name	Born	Nation	B.weight	Group	Snatch	CI&Jerk	Total
1	BAHLOUL Ramzi	18.10.1989	TUN	76.33	A	156	185	341
2	BELHOUT Amir	25.05.1989	ALG	76.43	A	141	163	304
3	MINKOUMBA Petit David	27.02.1989	CMR	76.02	A	126	157	283
4	MESSAOUI Saddam	24.07.1991	ALG	75.92	A	127	155	282
5	LAGSIR Abdelali	10.04.1990	MAR	75.78	A	112	150	262
6	MABUYA Khati	02.07.1988	RSA	72.50	A	114	142	256
7	DU PLOOY Lyle William Henry	02.08.1988	RSA	70.34	A	112	142	254
9	GAYADIN Youin	21.09.1985	MRI	75.75	A	95	115	210
---	SIMEON Charles Albert	16.06.1982	SEY	76.39	A	120	---	---

== 85 kg Men ==
Rank	Name	Born	Nation	B.weight	Group	Snatch	CI&Jerk	Total
1	MEKKI Abdallah	17.08.1985	ALG	82.28	A	135	160	295
2	DIXIE Terence Nigel	15.10.1983	SEY	84.18	A	126	160	286
3	ELWADDANI Abdulmoneim	06.09.1991	LBA	83.82	A	130	151	281
4	YAMIL Abdellatif	30.07.1981	MAR	84.53	A	123	156	279
---	MUSAAB Alosh	01.01.1988	LBA	77.44	A	131	---	---

== 94 kg Men ==
Rank	Name	Born	Nation	B.weight	Group	Snatch	CI&Jerk	Total
1	DOGHMANE Mohamed Amine	11.05.1991	TUN	91.64	A	158	181	339
2	ESHTIWI Mohamed	08.02.1985	LBA	86.30	A	152	175	327
3	BOUDANI Maamar	23.06.1984	ALG	92.79	A	142	181	323
4	NEMBOT Tagne	22.12.1982	CMR	89.89	A	141	165	306
5	BOURAS Omar	26.09.1991	ALG	85.70	A	125	150	275

== 105 kg Men ==
Rank	Name	Born	Nation	B.weight	Group	Snatch	CI&Jerk	Total
1	MIMOUNE Abdelhamid	08.03.1988	ALG	101.51	A	140	170	310
2	MOURAD Shtewi	01.01.1988	LBA	99.22	A	140	160	300
3	NGONGANG TANTCHOU Ferdianand	24.05.1977	CMR	98.80	A	120	160	280
---	HANACHI Mouez	20.02.1980	TUN	101.65	A	150	---	---

== +105 kg Men ==
Rank	Name	Born	Nation	B.weight	Group	Snatch	CI&Jerk	Total
1	FOKEJOU TEFOT Frederic	03.12.1979	CMR	132.80	A	150	190	340
2	AINSLIE William	02.08.1979	RSA	131.22	A	130	150	280
3	ALANANI Ibrahim Ehmeda	04.06.1993	LBA	106.83	A	110	130	240

== 48 kg Women ==
Rank	Name	Born	Nation	B.weight	Group	Snatch	CI&Jerk	Total
1	VRIES Portia Charmaine	21.07.1984	RSA	47.99	A	68	94	162
2	THELEMAQUE Katsia	28.02.1989	SEY	47.36	A	65	80	145
3	FILALI Kenza	27.12.1981	ALG	47.95	A	64	79	143
4	EHSSEINIA Henda	01.08.1984	TUN	47.44	A	60	73	133
5	RAKOTONDRAMANANA Harinelina Nathalia	15.01.1989	MAD	45.63	A	50	70	120
---	DIK Soumia	19.10.1988	MAR	43.18	A	55	---	---

== 53 kg Women ==
Rank	Name	Born	Nation	B.weight	Group	Snatch	CI&Jerk	Total
1	SOUMAYA Fatnassi	13.02.1980	TUN	52.63	A	75	95	170
2	KADIHAYA Assia	06.03.1989	MAR	51.73	A	63	80	143
3	MALVINA Juliette Ruby Rita	22.05.1984	SEY	51.83	A	60	75	135
4	ALINAFE Mchochomi	14.11.1993	MAW	52.44	A	45	60	105
DSQ	FOUODJI SONKBOU Arcangeline	26.08.1987	CMR	52.60	A	---	---	---

== 58 kg Women ==
Rank	Name	Born	Nation	B.weight	Group	Snatch	CI&Jerk	Total
1	HOSNI Nadia	29.08.1987	TUN	57.10	A	78	106	184
2	BAKAM TZUCHE Pilar	10.04.1988	CMR	57.09	A	76	95	171
3	PRETORIUS Mona	12.08.1988	RSA	57.83	A	73	95	168
4	GHEKAP WAFO Myriam	10.06.1994	CMR	56.24	A	70	85	155

== 63 kg Women ==
Rank	Name	Born	Nation	B.weight	Group	Snatch	CI&Jerk	Total
1	OURFELLI Hanene	08.01.1986	TUN	62.22	A	85	100	185
2	NGUIDJOL ESSESSE Hortense	17.05.1981	CMR	62.18	A	80	100	180
3	EPIE Osoungu Ndoua	11.10.1983	CMR	58.80	A	73	85	158
4	MASIU Matshidiso Hazel	06.05.1992	RSA	61.31	A	67	91	158
5	LENT Emmanwella	04.09.1985	MRI	62.36	A	70	88	158
---	HARIVELO Michelle Hantanirina Eugenie	29.04.1988	MAD	58.35	A	---	87	---

== 69 kg Women ==
Rank	Name	Born	Nation	B.weight	Group	Snatch	CI&Jerk	Total
1	GEORGES Janet Marie	05.01.1979	SEY	68.15	A	95	111	206
2	SAADAOUI Meriem	06.05.1990	TUN	68.48	A	75	102	177
3	AMMOURI Wafa	28.01.1985	MAR	68.62	A	70	90	160
4	RANAM Aharinirina	07.12.1980	MAD	65.62	A	67	86	153
---	FEGUE Marie Josephe	28.05.1991	CMR	64.21	A	---	110	---

== 75 kg Women ==
Rank	Name	Born	Nation	B.weight	Group	Snatch	CI&Jerk	Total
1	NZESSO NGAKE Madias Dodo	20.04.1992	CMR	74.19	A	96	120	216
2	ASMA Razgui	22.09.1988	TUN	73.64	A	93	115	208
---	NDLELENI Babalwa	14.03.1979	RSA	74.18	A	---	113	---

== +75 kg Women ==
Rank	Name	Born	Nation	B.weight	Group	Snatch	CI&Jerk	Total
1	JLASSI Marwa	25.09.1991	TUN	108.61	A	90	115	205
2	KANDOUEI Touria	20.04.1978	ALG	103.22	A	65	100	165
