= 2009 African Weightlifting Championships =

International weightlifting competition

2009 AFRICAN SENIOR (20th MEN, 9th WOMEN) CHAMPIONSHIPS

== 56 kg Men ==
| Rank | Name | Born | Nation | B.weight | Group | Snatch | CI&Jerk | Total |
|---|---|---|---|---|---|---|---|---|
| 1 | SOHAEB Tabal | 01.01.1986 | LBA | 55.77 | A | 107 | 128 | 235 |
| 2 | LARIKI Elhabib | 03.11.1987 | ALG | 55.45 | A | 101 | 120 | 221 |
| 3 | KATAMBA Ismail | 19.01.1987 | UGA | 55.72 | A | 90 | 127 | 217 |
| 4 | ZIANE Khiredine | 04.06.1989 | ALG | 55.82 | A | 92 | 117 | 209 |
| 5 | GUGANNOUNI Zied | 15.07.1991 | TUN | 55.88 | A | 93 | 116 | 209 |
| 6 | AHMED YAHIA Fouad Abdel Azim | 01.09.1992 | EGY | 55.98 | A | 93 | 115 | 208 |
| 7 | MARC Jonathan | 13.11.1989 | MRI | 54.34 | A | 90 | 115 | 205 |
| 8 | ANDRIANTSITOHAINA Eric Herman | 21.07.1991 | MAD | 53.43 | A | 77 | 97 | 174 |
| --- | MATAM David | 02.10.1982 | CMR | 55.36 | A | 92 | --- | --- |
| --- | BAKAR M. Ramadhan | 01.01.1993 | ZAN | 53.35 | A | 50 | --- | --- |

== 62 kg Men ==
| Rank | Name | Born | Nation | B.weight | Group | Snatch | CI&Jerk | Total |
|---|---|---|---|---|---|---|---|---|
| 1 | MAHMOUD Mohamed Ihab Youssef Ahmed | 21.11.1989 | EGY | 61.77 | A | 125 | 150 | 275 |
| 2 | MAIRIF Souhail | 13.02.1983 | ALG | 60.51 | A | 110 | 135 | 245 |
| 3 | BELINGA Joseph Ekani | 23.06.1989 | CMR | 61.90 | A | 110 | 130 | 240 |
| 4 | BEN ISSA Nafaa | 01.06.1989 | TUN | 61.20 | A | 106 | 129 | 235 |
| 5 | PHILLIPS Luwellyne Andrew | 21.08.1989 | RSA | 61.49 | A | 106 | 128 | 234 |
| 6 | MHNOD Abdel | 01.01.1992 | EGY | 61.98 | A | 105 | 128 | 233 |
| 7 | BELGHSEN Rodwan | 01.01.1986 | LBA | 61.38 | A | 103 | 128 | 231 |
| 8 | ADONIS Alphonso | 22.01.1986 | RSA | 61.09 | A | 97 | 126 | 223 |
| 9 | FARDJALLAH Housseyn | 16.01.1993 | ALG | 61.58 | A | 98 | 121 | 219 |
| 10 | SSEKYAAYA Charles | 11.04.1994 | UGA | 60.29 | A | 92 | 120 | 212 |
| 11 | JEAN Yanick Coret | 13.03.1991 | MRI | 59.63 | A | 95 | 110 | 205 |
| 12 | OCHIENG James | 01.02.1984 | KEN | 60.84 | A | 80 | 110 | 190 |
| 13 | PRITHIPAUL Seebaluck Praful | 10.06.1992 | MRI | 60.01 | A | 80 | 102 | 182 |
| 14 | CHARLES Chauyauya | 15.10.1993 | MAW | 59.51 | A | 66 | 94 | 160 |
| 15 | OCHIENG Nelson | 21.05.1993 | KEN | 60.42 | A | 65 | 87 | 152 |
| 16 | NOEL Kagwa | 20.09.1993 | MAW | 59.41 | A | 55 | 85 | 140 |

== 69 kg Men ==
| Rank | Name | Born | Nation | B.weight | Group | Snatch | CI&Jerk | Total |
|---|---|---|---|---|---|---|---|---|
| 1 | VENATIUS Njuh | 13.04.1988 | CMR | 67.43 | A | 120 | 155 | 275 |
| 2 | SHUSHU Otsile Greg | 20.08.1980 | RSA | 67.52 | A | 120 | 152 | 272 |
| 3 | YANOU KETCHANKE Jean Baptiste | 19.07.1993 | CMR | 67.93 | A | 121 | 150 | 271 |
| 4 | ABDUSSALAM Marwan | 28.05.1991 | LBA | 68.99 | A | 115 | 143 | 258 |
| 5 | MAGDI Mohamed Mohamed Mohamed Elkhamisi | 02.04.1993 | EGY | 68.80 | A | 117 | 140 | 257 |
| 6 | SOWOBI Noah | 01.01.1985 | UGA | 67.89 | A | 90 | 120 | 210 |
| 7 | TNOKO Kakhogwe | 07.06.1987 | MAW | 65.62 | A | 93 | 100 | 193 |
| 8 | FRANK Msoliza | 24.07.1981 | MAW | 68.22 | A | 70 | 102 | 172 |
| 9 | STEPHEN Odure | 01.01.1994 | KEN | 67.25 | A | 60 | 83 | 143 |
| --- | OKUMU Edwin | 01.01.1992 | UGA | 67.47 | A | 85 | --- | --- |

== 77 kg Men ==
| Rank | Name | Born | Nation | B.weight | Group | Snatch | CI&Jerk | Total |
|---|---|---|---|---|---|---|---|---|
| 1 | ABDALLA Ragab Abdelhay Saad A. | 04.03.1991 | EGY | 76.61 | A | 142 | 181 | 323 |
| 2 | MUSAAB Alosh | 01.01.1988 | LBA | 75.80 | A | 131 | 157 | 288 |
| 3 | MINKOUMBA Petit David | 27.02.1989 | CMR | 76.41 | A | 130 | 150 | 280 |
| 4 | DU PLOOY Lyle William Henry | 02.08.1988 | RSA | 71.22 | A | 118 | 143 | 261 |
| 5 | SIMEON Charles Albert | 16.06.1982 | SEY | 75.79 | A | 110 | 150 | 260 |
| 6 | THAPELO Maikhi | 28.02.1983 | RSA | 77.00 | A | 115 | 143 | 258 |
| 7 | BATUUSA Kalidi | 25.11.1986 | UGA | 74.21 | A | 110 | 130 | 240 |
| 8 | ODUOR Crispin Onyango | 22.04.1981 | KEN | 74.10 | A | 95 | 131 | 226 |
| 9 | GRASTEN Mkwapula | 14.02.1983 | MAW | 73.75 | A | 70 | 100 | 170 |

== 85 kg Men ==
| Rank | Name | Born | Nation | B.weight | Group | Snatch | CI&Jerk | Total |
|---|---|---|---|---|---|---|---|---|
| 1 | ELKEKLI Ali Moftah Said | 04.09.1989 | LBA | 83.01 | A | 140 | 185 | 325 |
| 2 | ANTHONY Darryn | 18.12.1985 | RSA | 83.68 | A | 147 | 178 | 325 |
| 3 | OMAR Kthiri | 01.01.1983 | TUN | 81.55 | A | 147 | 172 | 319 |
| 4 | ANTHONY Sean Marc | 05.04.1991 | RSA | 80.96 | A | 115 | 143 | 258 |
| 5 | ALI ABOU SALEH Moham | 01.01.1994 | EGY | 82.77 | A | 116 | 142 | 258 |
| 6 | BALIGEYA Godfrey | 28.07.1987 | UGA | 82.41 | A | 107 | 140 | 247 |
| 7 | ADEDE James Omondi | 31.10.1986 | KEN | 80.60 | A | 102 | 120 | 222 |
| 8 | MACHAKA Duke Onguti | 31.12.1993 | KEN | 77.55 | A | 85 | 120 | 205 |
| 9 | EMMANUEL Awali | 21.01.1981 | MAW | 84.64 | A | 80 | 120 | 200 |
| --- | BATCHAYA KETCHANKE Brice Vivien | 16.08.1985 | CMR | 82.53 | A | 146 | --- | --- |
| --- | TAWINA Chakwana | 12.10.1979 | MAW | 84.76 | A | 78 | --- | --- |

== 94 kg Men ==
| Rank | Name | Born | Nation | B.weight | Group | Snatch | CI&Jerk | Total |
|---|---|---|---|---|---|---|---|---|
| 1 | CHOUYA Rabeh | 10.09.1988 | ALG | 93.09 | A | 135 | 170 | 305 |
| 2 | GREEFF Jean | 17.04.1990 | RSA | 92.97 | A | 132 | 168 | 300 |
| 3 | DOGHMANE Mohamed Amine | 11.05.1991 | TUN | 89.20 | A | 132 | 155 | 287 |
| 4 | MOHAMED BAKR Attaalla Elsayed | 01.01.1992 | EGY | 86.64 | A | 125 | 157 | 282 |
| 5 | MAJED Abuoain | 01.01.1989 | LBA | 86.13 | A | 120 | 145 | 265 |
| 6 | WAISWA Ezekiel | 07.01.1984 | UGA | 87.89 | A | 90 | 110 | 200 |

== 105 kg Men ==
| Rank | Name | Born | Nation | B.weight | Group | Snatch | CI&Jerk | Total |
|---|---|---|---|---|---|---|---|---|
| 1 | MIMOUNE Abdelhamid | 08.03.1988 | ALG | 100.63 | A | 150 | 180 | 330 |
| 2 | MOURAD Shtewi | 01.01.1988 | LBA | 95.45 | A | 136 | 155 | 291 |
| 3 | HALALMIA Omar | 07.05.1989 | ALG | 94.94 | A | 131 | 150 | 281 |
| 4 | NGONGANG TANTCHOU Ferdianand | 24.05.1977 | CMR | 96.95 | A | 137 | 140 | 277 |
| 5 | KALYANGO Deo | 20.01.1988 | UGA | 100.94 | A | 110 | 151 | 261 |

== +105 kg Men ==
| Rank | Name | Born | Nation | B.weight | Group | Snatch | CI&Jerk | Total |
|---|---|---|---|---|---|---|---|---|
| 1 | ELSAYED Abdelrahman Mohamed A. A. | 19.05.1989 | EGY | 115.37 | A | 160 | 205 | 365 |
| 2 | FOKEJOU TEFOT Frederic | 03.12.1979 | CMR | 123.70 | A | 140 | 190 | 330 |
| 3 | MOHAMED Alrghig | 01.01.1991 | LBA | 159.40 | A | 122 | 150 | 272 |
| DSQ | MEZGHICH Ammar | 02.03.1989 | ALG | 109.86 | A | --- | --- | --- |

== 48 kg Women ==
| Rank | Name | Born | Nation | B.weight | Group | Snatch | CI&Jerk | Total |
|---|---|---|---|---|---|---|---|---|
| 1 | VRIES Portia Charmaine | 21.07.1984 | RSA | 47.69 | A | 65 | 90 | 155 |
| 2 | FILALI Kenza | 27.12.1981 | ALG | 47.94 | A | 61 | 80 | 141 |
| 3 | EHSSEINIA Henda | 01.08.1984 | TUN | 47.32 | A | 61 | 78 | 139 |
| 4 | THELEMAQUE Katsia | 28.02.1989 | SEY | 46.41 | A | 63 | 73 | 136 |
| 5 | MEJRI Oumaima | 22.08.1994 | TUN | 47.87 | A | 55 | 65 | 120 |
| 6 | HAULA Musoke | 01.01.1990 | UGA | 46.33 | A | 40 | 45 | 85 |

== 53 kg Women ==
| Rank | Name | Born | Nation | B.weight | Group | Snatch | CI&Jerk | Total |
|---|---|---|---|---|---|---|---|---|
| 1 | SOUMAYA Fatnassi | 13.02.1980 | TUN | 52.92 | A | 79 | 99 | 178 |
| 2 | AGRICOLE Clementina Ciana | 18.07.1988 | SEY | 52.38 | A | 78 | 92 | 170 |
| 3 | BAKAM TZUCHE Pilar | 10.04.1988 | CMR | 52.32 | A | 69 | 98 | 167 |
| 4 | SINAZO Adonis | 18.04.1990 | RSA | 52.33 | A | 55 | 66 | 121 |
| 5 | KAYTESI Milly | 01.01.1990 | UGA | 51.35 | A | 40 | 50 | 90 |
| 6 | ALINAFE Mchochomi | 14.11.1993 | MAW | 52.87 | A | 40 | 40 | 80 |
| 7 | NAKAYIZA Nashiba | 01.01.1994 | UGA | 52.19 | A | 30 | 35 | 65 |

== 58 kg Women ==
| Rank | Name | Born | Nation | B.weight | Group | Snatch | CI&Jerk | Total |
|---|---|---|---|---|---|---|---|---|
| 1 | MAY Nourhene | 18.03.1991 | TUN | 57.31 | A | 81 | 90 | 171 |
| 2 | PRETORIUS Mona | 12.08.1988 | RSA | 57.26 | A | 77 | 85 | 162 |
| 3 | CHEKAP Ossoungoo | 01.01.1994 | CMR | 54.91 | A | 67 | 80 | 147 |
| 4 | EPIE Osoungu Ndoua | 11.10.1983 | CMR | 55.99 | A | 65 | 80 | 145 |

== 63 kg Women ==
| Rank | Name | Born | Nation | B.weight | Group | Snatch | CI&Jerk | Total |
|---|---|---|---|---|---|---|---|---|
| 1 | HOSNI Nadia | 29.08.1987 | TUN | 58.81 | A | 83 | 105 | 188 |
| 2 | NGUIDJOL ESSESSE Hortense | 17.05.1981 | CMR | 61.64 | A | 80 | 105 | 185 |
| 3 | THELERMONT Janet | 05.01.1979 | SEY | 60.44 | A | 82 | 95 | 177 |
| 4 | MASIU Matshidiso Hazel | 06.05.1992 | RSA | 60.30 | A | 63 | 81 | 144 |
| 5 | BEN MAKHLOUF Faiza | 21.03.1991 | ALG | 62.63 | A | 60 | 76 | 136 |
| 6 | RAMAROU Tlalane Joyce | 19.09.1994 | RSA | 61.77 | A | 58 | 75 | 133 |
| 7 | FRONZINAH Nuzany | 25.12.1985 | KEN | 60.94 | A | 35 | 45 | 80 |

== 69 kg Women ==
| Rank | Name | Born | Nation | B.weight | Group | Snatch | CI&Jerk | Total |
|---|---|---|---|---|---|---|---|---|
| 1 | MIYENGA Helene Laure | 17.11.1984 | CMR | 67.66 | A | 80 | 90 | 170 |
| 2 | NYANGA Prossy Irene | 15.08.1989 | UGA | 64.80 | A | 68 | 80 | 148 |
| 3 | SIMONEY Clarre | 24.12.1990 | RSA | 68.08 | A | 63 | 68 | 131 |

== 75 kg Women ==
| Rank | Name | Born | Nation | B.weight | Group | Snatch | CI&Jerk | Total |
|---|---|---|---|---|---|---|---|---|
| 1 | NZESSO NGAKE Madias Dodo | 20.04.1992 | CMR | 72.77 | A | 90 | 112 | 202 |
| 2 | NDLELENI Babalwa | 14.03.1979 | RSA | 74.61 | A | 80 | 115 | 195 |
| 3 | ASMA Razgui | 22.09.1988 | TUN | 74.47 | A | 86 | 108 | 194 |
| 4 | LAKHNI Ahlem | 14.04.1991 | ALG | 74.72 | A | 65 | 83 | 148 |

== +75 kg Women ==
| Rank | Name | Born | Nation | B.weight | Group | Snatch | CI&Jerk | Total |
|---|---|---|---|---|---|---|---|---|
| 1 | JLASSI Marwa | 25.09.1991 | TUN | 107.09 | A | 85 | 109 | 194 |
| 2 | NAMUSOKE Becky | 10.12.1990 | UGA | 92.55 | A | 72 | 90 | 162 |
| 3 | NAMUGALU Beth | 01.01.1989 | UGA | 83.11 | A | 50 | 70 | 120 |
