= Christine Girard =

Canadian weightlifter (born 1985)

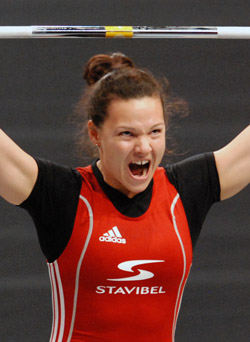
- Christine Girard, 2011 WWC

Personal information
- Nationality: Canadian
- Born: January 3, 1985 (age 41) Elliot Lake, Ontario
- Height: 1.60 m (5 ft 3 in)

Sport
- Sport: Weightlifting
- Club: Héraclès, Rouyn-Noranda
- Coached by: Walter Bailey; Jeane Lassen; Guy Marineau
- Retired: 2015

Achievements and titles
- Olympic finals: 2008, 2012
Medal record
Representing Canada
Olympic Games
Gold medal – first place	2012 London	-63 kg
Bronze medal – third place	2008 Beijing	-63 kg
Commonwealth Games
Gold medal – first place	2010 Delhi	-69 kg
Silver medal – second place	2006 Melbourne	-63 kg
Bronze medal – third place	2002 Manchester	-63 kg
Pan American Games
Gold medal – first place	2011 Guadalajara	-63 kg
Silver medal – second place	2007 Rio de Janeiro	-63 kg
- Updated on May 2017

Christine Girard (born January 3, 1985) is a Canadian weightlifter from Rouyn-Noranda, Quebec (currently living in Gatineau, Quebec). She competes in the 63 kg division. Girard was the first Canadian female to win a medal in weightlifting when she won gold at the 2012 London Olympics. She also won Commonwealth Games and Pan American Games titles in her weight class and has won multiple medals in each of those competitions. She holds the Commonwealth games record and the Pan-American Games record in the Clean and Jerk.

== Career ==
Weightlifting became a passion for Girard and her three sisters when they moved to Quebec. She began training early and entered her first provincial competition when she was 12. Girard became a member of the national team in 2001 at the age of 16 when she competed in Greece. In 2002, she won a bronze medal at the Commonwealth Games which she improved upon in 2006 with a silver. At the 2006 University World Championships she won the bronze medal. She next won a silver at the 2007 Pan American Games. Girard then finished 8th at the 2007 World Weightlifting Championships with a total of 221 kg. Girard then entered the 2008 Summer Olympics, she improved upon this by finishing fourth, with a total of 228 kg and 3 kg away from a medal.

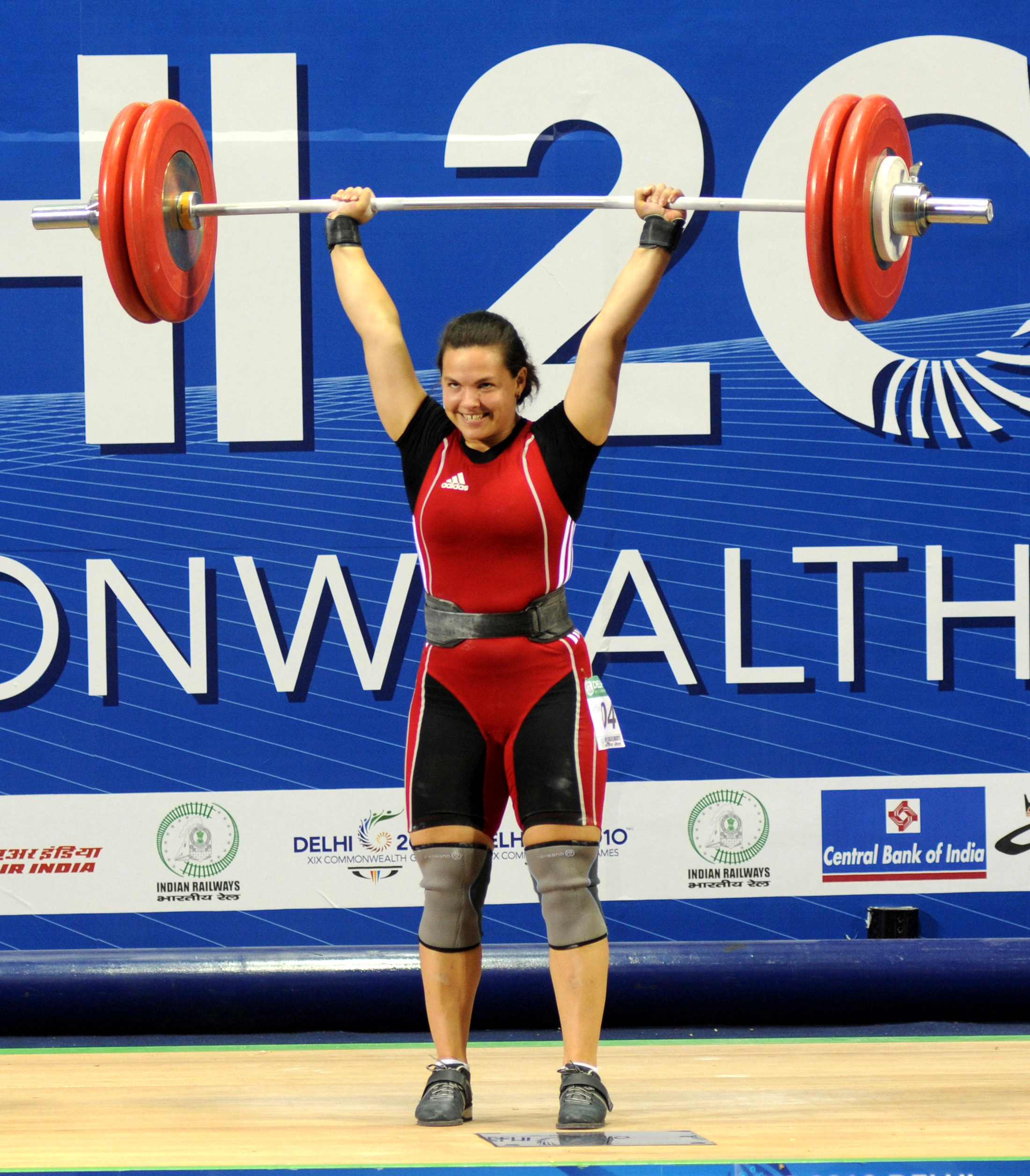
Girard at the 2010 Commonwealth Games.

Girard built upon these achievements by finally winning a crown as champion when she won the gold medal at the 2010 Commonwealth Games in Delhi and completed her Commonwealth Games medal collection. En route to winning her gold Girard set a Commonwealth Games record in the snatch at 105 kg, in the clean and jerk she added an additional 130 kg for a total of 235 kg which were also Commonwealth records. Girard next conquered the 2011 Pan American Games when she won the gold in her weight class in Guadalajara.

At the 2012 Summer Olympics, Girard participated in the women's 63 kg. She finished fourth in the snatch portion, then second in the clean and jerk, lifting 133 kg. Her total of 236 kg put her third, behind Maiya Maneza and Svetlana Tsarukayeva. She became the first Canadian woman, and third Canadian overall, to win a medal in weightlifting. Girard said that winning the Olympic medal was one of her top two best moments in life, "It is very hard to describe how I feel. Four years ago in Beijing I came fourth, and since then I have spent the past four years training through injuries and various changes in my life to get to this moment. All I have been thinking about is getting on the podium. Now I have reached it. It feels good. I should say my wedding comes close, but this is completely different.

In July 2016, the International Weightlifting Federation (IWF) reported that the IOC reanalyses of samples taken in 2012 uncovered prohibited anabolic agents in both the gold medallist and silver medallist. These were confirmed in 2018, making Girard the first Canadian gold medallist in female weightlifting since its introduction in 2000. This was confirmed in April 2018.

After a reanalysis of the 2008 Beijing Olympics in August 2016, the IWF reported that silver medallist Irina Nekrassova had used a prohibited substance. This was confirmed in 2018 and Girard was awarded a bronze medal, preceding her previous standing of first female Canadian weightlifting medallist to 2008. Girard received both the Beijing bronze and London gold medals at a ceremony in Ottawa on December 3, 2018.

In October 2019, Girard was inducted into the Canadian Olympic Committee's Hall of Fame.

In July 2020, Girard was inducted into the Pan-American Weightlifting Federation's Hall of Fame.

In February 2023, Girard was named Chef de Mission for Team Canada at the 2023 Pan-American Games in Santiago, Chile.

== Coaching ==
Girard began coaching other athletes in weightlifting after her move to BC while she was preparing for the 2012 Summer Olympics. Upon her return from the Olympic Games, Girard began coaching in a greater capacity. She started her own weightlifting club – the Kilophile Weightlifting Club – and offers coaching services to other fitness centres notably in Crossfit Gyms.

== Anti-Doping Advocacy ==
Girard is involved in anti-doping advocacy work at both the domestic and international level. Girard is on the board of directors at the Canadian Centre for Ethics in Sport, the International Weightlifting Federation's Anti-Doping Commission and is an Education Ambassador with the International Testing Agency.

== Personal life ==
Girard was born in Elliot Lake, Ontario but moved with her family to Rouyn-Noranda, Quebec in 1992 when she was seven. She then moved to White Rock, British Columbia in January 2010, before returning to Quebec in 2018, this time settling in the city of Gatineau in Canada's National Capital Region. Weightlifting was a family affair for Girard and her family continues to hold provincial and local roles for the sport in Quebec. On June 11, 2011 she married her coach Walter Bailey. She has three children.

== Occupational Therapy ==
In 2021, Girard received her Masters of Health Sciences Degree in Occupational Therapy from the University of Ottawa. Girard is a practicing Occupational Therapist, and is registered with the College of Occupational Therapists of Ontario and Association canadienne des ergothérapeutes.
