= Lu Ying-chi =

Taiwanese weightlifter (born 1985)

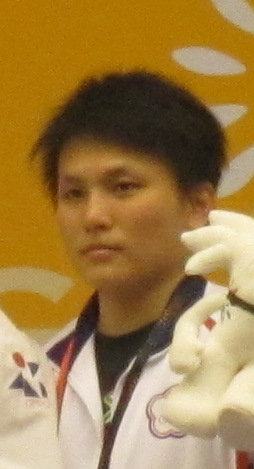

Medal record

Women's Weightlifting

Representing Chinese Taipei

Olympic Games
Silver medal – second place	2008 Beijing	63 kg

Lu Ying-chi (Chinese: 盧映錡; pinyin: Lú Yìngqí; born 6 April 1985 in Pingtung County, Taiwan) is a weightlifter from Taiwan.

At the 2006 World Weightlifting Championships she ranked 8th in the 63 kg category with a total of 215 kg.

She won the silver medal in the 63 kg category at the 2008 Summer Olympics, with 231 kg in total.
