= Mun Yu-ra =

South Korean weightlifter (born 1990)

- Hangul: 문유라
- RR: Mun Yura
- MR: Mun Yura

Mun Yu-ra (Korean: 문유라; born 13 May 1990 in Gyeonggi, South Korea) is a South Korean weightlifter. She competed at the 2012 Summer Olympics in the -69 kg event.
