= 2012 African Weightlifting Championships =

The results of the 2012 African Weightlifting Championships.

== 56 kg Men ==
Rank	Name	Born	Nation	B.weight	Group	Snatch	CI&Jerk	Total
1	LARIKI Elhabib	03.11.1987	ALG	55.60	A	100	125	225
2	GIWA Taju	09.12.1992	NGR	55.20	A	96	120	216
3	OUERTANI Marouan	28.04.1995	TUN	55.35	A	96	119	215
4	ADONIS Monree	03.12.1988	RSA	55.40	A	90	118	208
5	CHIGAR Abdeghani	20.02.1989	MAR	55.85	A	93	115	208
6	KYAMBADDE Faluku Figo	28.08.1996	UGA	56.00	A	61	87	148
7	NDUNGU James	25.12.1993	KEN	55.52	A	60	77	137

== 62 kg Men ==
Rank	Name	Born	Nation	B.weight	Group	Snatch	CI&Jerk	Total
1	FADODUN Sola Dele	25.02.1992	NGR	61.25	A	110	140	250
2	BEN ISSA Nafaa	01.06.1989	TUN	61.65	A	113	137	250
3	MBALLA NKE Cestin Olivier	12.03.1993	CMR	61.25	A	110	136	246
4	SSEKYAAYA Charles	11.04.1994	UGA	61.55	A	105	141	246
5	MOUSSA Abdella Khalifa Mohamed	12.01.1992	LBA	61.90	A	106	131	237
6	KATAMBA Ismail	19.01.1987	UGA	61.75	A	102	133	235
7	PHILLIPS Luwellyne Andrew	21.08.1989	RSA	61.05	A	100	125	225
8	DARKO Daniel	12.05.1986	GHA	61.45	A	87	115	202
9	MOGIRE Julius K.	04.11.1993	KEN	60.95	A	85	100	185
---	MOUAKIT Ahmed	18.03.1983	MAR	61.85	A	---	125	---

== 69 kg Men ==
Rank	Name	Born	Nation	B.weight	Group	Snatch	CI&Jerk	Total
1	SHUSHU Otsile Greg	20.08.1980	RSA	68.95	A	125	160	285
2	FARDJALLAH Housseyn	16.01.1993	ALG	68.85	A	125	151	276
3	VENATIUS Njuh	13.04.1988	CMR	68.10	A	120	155	275
4	JOMNI Hamza	22.01.1989	TUN	68.25	A	124	150	274
5	BEN HNIA Karem	13.11.1994	TUN	66.20	A	123	150	273
6	ADEYOMO David	21.04.1993	NGR	66.05	A	112	150	262
7	NGONGANG TCHUISSI Guy Michel	18.02.1995	CMR	68.10	A	116	145	261
8	LABRAK Abdessamad	14.06.1989	MAR	67.85	A	116	137	253
9	NGWELE Mninikhaya	12.10.1992	RSA	67.85	B	110	131	241
10	ROSE Ian Nigel	21.09.1981	SEY	68.05	B	105	135	240
11	FETRIE Seth Degbe	24.09.1991	GHA	68.70	B	100	137	237
12	OCHIENG James	01.02.1984	KEN	68.70	B	96	122	218
13	LUBEGA Jamiru	11.11.1997	UGA	65.50	B	90	120	210
---	OCHIENG Nelson	21.05.1993	KEN	68.05	B	---	115	---
---	TUBAL Maraj S.Omer	10.01.1994	LBA	68.35	A	128	---	---

== 77 kg Men ==
Rank	Name	Born	Nation	B.weight	Group	Snatch	CI&Jerk	Total
1	EKPO Felix	10.09.1981	NGR	76.25	A	151	181	332
2	BAHLOUL Rami	29.07.1991	TUN	76.20	A	145	185	330
3	BELHOUT Amir	25.05.1989	ALG	75.60	A	140	165	305
4	YANOU KETCHANKE Jean Baptiste	19.07.1993	CMR	75.15	A	135	165	300
5	ALOSH Mussab	17.10.1988	LBA	76.15	A	131	166	297
6	ABDUSSALAM Marwan	28.05.1991	LBA	77.00	A	131	160	291
7	MESSAOUI Saddam	24.07.1991	ALG	76.85	A	131	155	286
8	EL MOUJOUD Ali	24.07.1982	MAR	76.15	A	125	145	270
9	DODOO Nii Darku	21.03.1987	GHA	74.85	A	100	150	250
10	MEHRAB Abdelhalim Abdelgadir Wagie	01.01.1993	SUD	73.55	A	115	130	245
11	BATUUSA Kalidi	25.11.1986	UGA	75.55	B	110	135	245
---	OYIM Arthur	03.11.1985	KEN	75.35	A	110	---	---
---	ETTALEB Mustapha	29.08.1986	MAR	75.20	B	---	139	---

== 85 kg Men ==
Rank	Name	Born	Nation	B.weight	Group	Snatch	CI&Jerk	Total
1	ELKEKLI Ali Moftah Said	04.09.1989	LBA	84.15	A	155	191	346
2	ULOKO Benedict	19.03.1984	NGR	83.70	A	150	185	335
3	MEKKI Abdallah	17.08.1985	ALG	84.00	A	145	173	318
4	MINKOUMBA Petit David	27.02.1989	CMR	82.95	A	130	170	300
5	MACHAKA Duke Onguti	31.12.1993	KEN	83.20	A	120	160	280
6	BATCHAYA KETCHANKE Brice Vivien	16.08.1985	CMR	84.80	A	120	150	270
7	DIXIE Terence Nigel	15.10.1983	SEY	84.55	A	122	147	269
8	BAKADI Ayoub	17.12.1994	MAR	81.80	A	110	150	260
9	FETRIE Majeti	12.06.1974	GHA	82.65	A	112	140	252
10	PIERROT Jean Yvan	23.05.1996	MRI	80.95	A	95	120	215
DSQ	YAMIL Abdellatif	30.07.1981	MAR	84.50	A	---	---	---

== 94 kg Men ==
Rank	Name	Born	Nation	B.weight	Group	Snatch	CI&Jerk	Total
1	DOGHMANE Mohamed Amine	11.05.1991	TUN	92.35	A	150	190	340
2	BOUDANI Maamar	23.06.1984	ALG	93.50	A	140	185	325
3	ELWADDANI Abdulmoneim	06.09.1991	LBA	93.10	A	151	171	322
4	GREEFF Jean	17.04.1990	RSA	93.35	A	130	172	302
5	LAGSIR Abdelali	10.04.1990	MAR	87.40	A	120	169	289
6	WAISWA Ezekiel	07.01.1984	UGA	92.60	A	90	110	200
---	OLUSHOLA Friday	28.02.1990	NGR	92.25	A	149	---	---

== 105 kg Men ==
Rank	Name	Born	Nation	B.weight	Group	Snatch	CI&Jerk	Total
1	BIDANI Walid	11.06.1994	ALG	103.65	A	150	183	333
2	IFEAYIN Ikwuagwu	06.10.1983	NGR	103.75	A	140	182	322
3	BEN SAID Mohamed	17.03.1988	LBA	97.70	A	126	161	287
4	NGONGANG TANTCHOU Ferdianand	24.05.1977	CMR	96.40	A	130	156	286
5	MAZAMEL Khamis Eissa Koko	02.12.1986	SUD	94.25	A	127	153	280
6	LARKYNE Nii Otoo	11.11.1995	GHA	100.20	A	117	150	267
7	SHAW Gordon	23.06.1994	RSA	97.95	A	110	135	245

== +105 kg Men ==
Rank	Name	Born	Nation	B.weight	Group	Snatch	CI&Jerk	Total
1	FOKEJOU TEFOT Frederic	03.12.1979	CMR	121.25	A	151	192	343
2	ABDULHAKEEM Tijjani	07.02.1987	NGR	111.55	A	146	191	337
3	MIMOUNE Abdelhamid	08.03.1988	ALG	105.30	A	146	186	332
4	SALEM Abdelatif	01.06.1986	TUN	106.95	A	130	160	290
5	ABOTSI Albert Kwame Mensah	20.06.1981	GHA	107.20	A	120	170	290
6	ELJADID ELAZIBI Abdalla Salem	21.01.1995	LBA	124.15	A	105	150	255

== 48 kg Women ==
Rank	Name	Born	Nation	B.weight	Group	Snatch	CI&Jerk	Total
1	NWAOKOLO Augustina Nkem	12.12.1992	NGR	47.25	A	75	95	170
2	RAKOTONDRAMANANA Harinelina Nathalia	15.01.1989	MAD	46.95	A	55	70	125
3	SIBAR Sara	28.08.1995	MAR	46.90	A	47	57	104
4	WAIRIMU Lasoi	27.05.1985	KEN	46.75	A	35	42	77
---	NWAOKOLO Augustina Nkem	12.12.1992	NGR	47.25	A	75	0.0	---

== 53 kg Women ==
Rank	Name	Born	Nation	B.weight	Group	Snatch	CI&Jerk	Total
1	FEDELIS Chineye Silver	28.10.1993	NGR	52.50	A	87	115	202
2	MEJRI Oumaima	22.08.1994	TUN	53.00	A	65	85	150
3	MJEZU Zayanda	21.08.1992	RSA	52.85	A	63	84	147
4	BAFFOE Ruth	07.11.1994	GHA	52.45	A	62	75	137
5	JERNANE Hind	22.09.1992	MAR	51.45	A	47	57	104
6	MWANGI Prisca	15.02.1982	KEN	49.65	A	40	45	85

== 58 kg Women ==
Rank	Name	Born	Nation	B.weight	Group	Snatch	CI&Jerk	Total
1	UWAH Margaret	03.11.1983	NGR	57.25	A	85	106	191
2	HOSNI Nadia	29.08.1987	TUN	57.25	A	75	100	175
3	GHEKAP WAFO Myriam	10.06.1994	CMR	56.80	A	75	97	172
4	MALVINA Juliette Ruby Rita	22.05.1984	SEY	56.95	A	73	95	168
5	PRETORIUS Mona	12.08.1988	RSA	57.45	A	75	93	168
6	HARIVELO Michelle Hantanirina Eugenie	29.04.1988	MAD	57.25	A	65	85	150
7	MAJIDI Islam	18.03.1985	MAR	57.55	A	62	80	142
8	ARKOH Juliana	21.08.1997	GHA	56.25	A	57	70	127
9	GOLIATH Amigene	04.11.1996	RSA	56.75	A	55	65	120

== 63 kg Women ==
Rank	Name	Born	Nation	B.weight	Group	Snatch	CI&Jerk	Total
1	OKOLI Obioma Agatha	03.07.1992	NGR	61.60	A	95	120	215
2	FEGUE Marie Josephe	28.05.1991	CMR	61.85	A	92	110	202
3	MAY Nourhene	18.03.1991	TUN	59.40	A	76	91	167
4	EPIE Osoungu Ndoua	11.10.1983	CMR	60.25	A	76	85	161
5	MASIU Matshidiso Hazel	06.05.1992	RSA	61.85	A	67	90	157
6	OBIERO Mercy Apondi	27.08.1978	KEN	61.40	A	65	91	156
7	MAJIDI Amal	10.11.1983	MAR	60.95	A	62	80	142

== 69 kg Women ==
Rank	Name	Born	Nation	B.weight	Group	Snatch	CI&Jerk	Total
1	GEORGES Janet Marie	05.01.1979	SEY	68.30	A	94	114	208
2	ADESANMI Oluwatoyin Victoria	10.04.1992	NGR	64.75	A	90	115	205
3	HASSINE Ghada	17.05.1993	TUN	66.25	A	90	108	198
4	ABOTSI Dora Afi	22.02.1991	GHA	67.95	A	80	100	180
5	MIYENGA Helene Laure	17.11.1984	CMR	68.60	A	70	90	160
6	RAVOLOLONIAINA Elisa Vania	24.02.1992	MAD	64.40	A	55	70	125
7	ALYA Ahmed Madani Agalain	01.01.1992	SUD	65.00	A	45	60	105
8	WANYONYI Fronzinah	12.12.1985	KEN	65.81	A	47	57	104

== 75 kg Women ==
Rank	Name	Born	Nation	B.weight	Group	Snatch	CI&Jerk	Total
1	NZESSO NGAKE Madias Dodo	20.04.1992	CMR	74.90	A	98	127	225
2	OTUNLA Bilikis Abiodun	12.06.1994	NGR	71.45	A	97	120	217
3	AMMOURI Wafa	28.01.1985	MAR	74.60	A	75	100	175
4	AMPOMAH Alberta Boatema	03.11.1994	GHA	74.00	A	73	100	173
5	MOHASIN Haroun Mohamed	05.01.1989	SUD	75.00	A	67	80	147
6	RANAIVOSOA Marie Hanitra Roilya	14.11.1990	MRI	69.85	A	57	78	135
7	RAZAFINDRANAIVO Vololotina Francia A.	24.03.1990	MAD	73.95	A	60	75	135

== +75 kg Women ==
Rank	Name	Born	Nation	B.weight	Group	Snatch	CI&Jerk	Total
1	USMAN Maryam	09.11.1990	NGR	121.80	A	125	156	281
2	JLASSI Marwa	25.09.1991	TUN	113.45	A	92	126	218
3	VALAYDON Shalinee	13.04.1986	MRI	110.45	A	83	104	187
4	NAMUSOKE Becky	10.12.1990	UGA	92.70	A	82	103	185
5	MEUKEUGNI NOUMBISSI Clementine	01.10.1990	CMR	83.25	A	65	75	140
---	NGUIDJOL ESSESSE Hortense	17.05.1981	CMR	79.00	A	---	95	---
