= Maiya Maneza =

Kazakhstani weightlifter (born 1985)

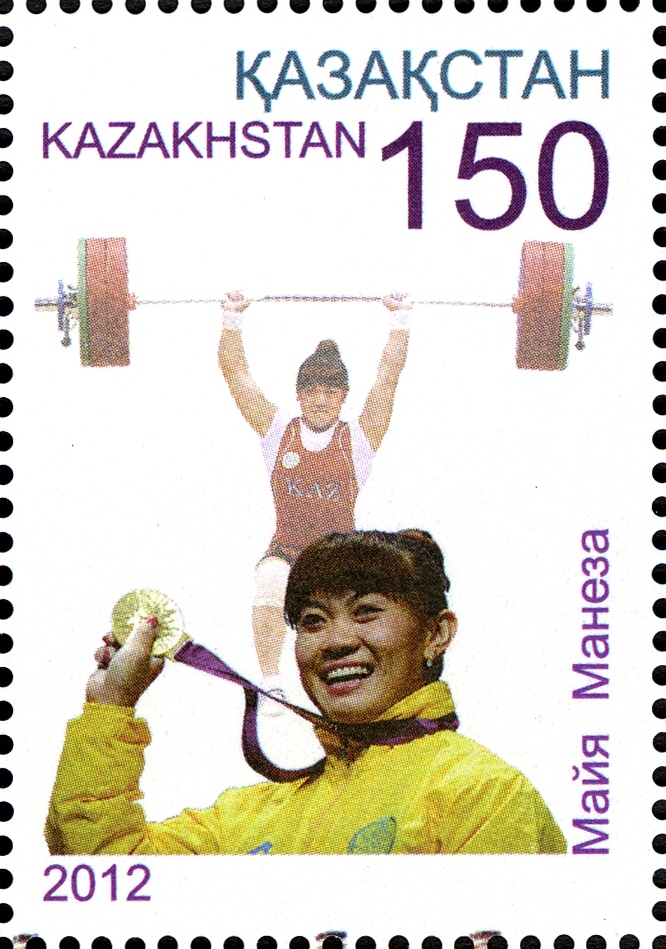
- Maneza depicted on a stamp from Kazakhstan

Personal information
- Born: 1 November 1985 (age 40) Tokmok, Kyrgyz SSR, Soviet Union
- Height: 1.61 m (5 ft 3 1/2 in)
- Weight: 63 kg (139 lb)

Chinese name
- Simplified Chinese: 姚丽
- Traditional Chinese: 姚麗
Transcriptions
Standard Mandarin
- Hanyu Pinyin: Yáo Lì
other Mandarin
- Dungan: Йо Ли

Russian name
- Russian: Майя Салахаровна Манеза

Kazakh name
- Kazakh: Майя Салахарқызы Манеза

Sport
- Sport: Weightlifting
- Event: 63 kg
Medal record
Representing Kazakhstan
Olympic Games
Disqualified	2012 London	– 63 kg
World Weightlifting Championships
Gold medal – first place	2009 Goyang	– 63 kg
Gold medal – first place	2010 Antalya	– 63 kg
Silver medal – second place	2011 Paris	– 63 kg
Asian Games
Gold medal – first place	2010 Guangzhou	– 63 kg
- Updated on 27 October 2016

Maiya Salakharqyzy Maneza (Kazakh: Майя Салахарқызы Манеза; Russian: Майя Салахаровна Манеза; born 1 November 1985) is a Kazakhstani weightlifter. She initially won the gold medal at the 2012 Summer Olympics in the 63 kg category by lifting a combined weight of 245 kg and set a new Olympic record in the process. She was later stripped of her Olympic medal after a failed drug test.

== Personal life ==
Maneza is a member of the ethnic Dungan minority. Born in Soviet Kyrgyzstan, she moved to Kazakhstan in 2007 and competes for Kazakhstan. Chinese media reported that she was born Yao Li (Chinese: 姚丽; pinyin: Yáo Lì, Dungan: Йо Ли) in Tayingzi Village, Wuhuanchi Town, Fuxin Mongol Autonomous County, Liaoning Province, and emigrated to Kazakhstan in 2008 along with Zulfiya Chinshanlo with the approval of Hunan sport officials on a lease contract.

Following her Olympic medal win the People's Republic of China government news agency, Xinhua claimed that Maneza and fellow weightlifter Zulfiya Chinshanlo should be regarded as Chinese. The government of Kazakhstan rejected this claim and accused China of "poor sportsmanship".

== Failed drug tests ==
In June 2016, the International Weightlifting Federation (IWF) announced that retests of the samples taken from the 2012 London Games indicated that Maneza had tested positive for prohibited substances, namely stanazolol. The samples of three other Kazakhstanis also returned positive test results upon re-analysis: Zulfiya Chinshanlo, Svetlana Podobedova and Ilya Ilyin. On 27 October 2016, the IOC stripped Maneza of her 2012 Olympic gold medal.

In August 2016, the IWF reported that retests of the samples taken from the 2008 Beijing Games indicated that Maneza had returned an adverse analytical finding for stanazolol, she being among 15 weightlifters from Azerbaijan, Belarus, China, Kazakhstan, Russia, and Ukraine whose samples returned positive test results upon re-analysis. The three other Kazakhstanis were Mariya Grabovetskaya and Irina Nekrassova, whose Olympic medals were revoked by the IOC on 17 November 2016, and Vladimir Sedov. The IOC also disqualified Maneza from the 2008 Olympic Games for failing a drugs test in a re-analysis of her doping sample from 2008, even though she withdrew from the competition before it was held.
