= Svetlana Tsarukaeva =

Russian weightlifter (born 1987)

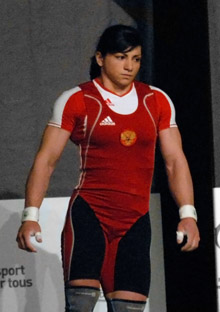
- Svetlana Tsarukaeva, 2011 WWC

Personal information
- Born: 25 December 1987 (age 38) Ordzhonikidze, Russian SFSR, Soviet Union
- Height: 1.62 m (5 ft 4 in)
- Weight: 63 kg (139 lb)

Sport
- Country: Russia
- Sport: Weightlifting
- Event: 63kg
- Coached by: Kazbek Zoloev
Medal record
Women's Weightlifting
Representing Russia
Olympic Games
| Disqualified | 2012 London | 63 kg |
World Weightlifting Championships
| Gold medal – first place | 2011 Paris | 63 kg |
| Silver medal – second place | 2006 Doha | 58 kg |
| Silver medal – second place | 2007 Chiang Mai | 63 kg |
| Silver medal – second place | 2009 Goyang | 63 kg |
European Championships
| Silver medal – second place | 2011 Kazan | 63 kg |
- Updated on 7 October 2016

Svetlana Kaspolatovna Tsarukaeva (Russian: Светлана Касполатовна Царукаева) (born 25 December 1987) is a Russian weightlifter.

== Career ==
She won the 2006 Women's Junior World Championships in the 58 kg category, with a total of 231 kg.

Tsarukaeva participated in the women's -58 kg category at the 2006 World Weightlifting Championships and won the silver medal, finishing behind Qiu Hongmei. She snatched 108 kg and clean and jerked an additional 125 kg for a total of 233 kg, 4 kg behind winner Qiu.

At the 2007 World Weightlifting Championships she won the silver medal in the 63 kg category, with a total of 250 kg.

Tsarukaeva entered the 2008 Summer Olympics as the favourite for the 63 kg event.

Tsarukaeva was initially awarded a silver medal at the 2012 Summer Olympics in the Women's 63 kg event. However, on 27 July 2016, the IWF reported that, in the IOC's second wave of re-sampling for doping violations at the 2012 Summer Olympics, Tsarukayeva had tested positive for the steroid dehydrochlormethyltestosterone. If confirmed, she would be stripped of the Olympic medal. The IWF has provisionally suspended her. On 5 April 2017 it was announced that as a result of retesting samples she had been disqualified from the 2012 Olympics for a drug violation, and her silver medal withdrawn.

== Achievements ==
2006 World Weightlifting Championships, -58 kg
2007 World Weightlifting Championships, -63 kg
