= Luz Acosta =

Mexican weightlifter (born 1980)

Personal information
- Born: December 22, 1980 (age 45) Guaymas, Sonora, Mexico
- Height: 1.66 m (5 ft 5 1/2 in)
- Weight: 63 kg (139 lb)

Sport
- Country: Mexico
- Sport: Weightlifting
- Event: 63kg
- Coached by: Joel Pastor Roman
Medal record
Representing Mexico
Olympic Games
| Bronze medal – third place | 2012 London | -63 kg |
Pan American Games
| Bronze medal – third place | 2011 Guadalajara | 63 kg |

Luz Mercedes Acosta Tollefson (born December 22, 1980, in Guaymas, Sonora, Mexico) is a Mexican former weightlifter who competed for her native country at the Olympic level.

She made her Olympic debut at the 2008 Summer Olympics, where she finished in 8th place. Later on she participated at the 2011 Pan American Games at Guadalajara, Mexico, where she won the bronze medal.

In 2012, she qualified to participate at the 2012 Summer Olympics, her second Olympic Games. She participated in the 63 kg category, finishing in 6th place. Years later, positive doping tests for the gold and silver medalists raised the prospect of her being upgraded to the bronze medal position in the 2012 Olympic event. This was confirmed in May 2017. Acosta expressed disappointment at not having been able to stand on the podium at the Olympics itself, but was pleased at having set an example for clean competition.
