= Kim Soo-kyung (weightlifter) =

South Korean weightlifter (born 1985)

Personal information
- Nationality: South Korea
- Born: 6 August 1985 (age 40)
- Height: 1.60 m (5 ft 3 in)
- Weight: 63 kg (139 lb)

Korean name
- Hangul: 김수경
- RR: Gim Sugyeong
- MR: Kim Sugyŏng

Sport
- Sport: Weightlifting
- Event: 63 kg
Medal record
Women's weightlifting
Representing South Korea
Asian Games
Silver medal – second place	2010 Guangzhou	63 kg

Kim Soo-kyung (Korean: 김수경; born August 6, 1985) is a South Korean weightlifter. She won a silver medal for the 63 kg class at the 2010 Asian Games in Guangzhou, China, with a total of 240 kilograms.

Kim made her official debut for the 2004 Summer Olympics in Athens, where she competed for the women's middleweight class (63 kg). She finished only in fifth place by 2.5 kilograms short of her snatch record from Tunisia's Hayet Sassi, with a total of 215.0 kg (92.5 in the snatch, and 122.5 in the clean and jerk).

At the 2008 Summer Olympics in Beijing, Kim qualified for the second time in the women's 63 kg class, after finishing sixth from the 2007 World Weightlifting Championships in Chiang Mai, Thailand. Kim placed sixth in this event, as she successfully lifted 98 kg in the single-motion snatch, and hoisted 127 kg in the two-part, shoulder-to-overhead clean and jerk, for a total of 225 kg.
