= 2002 World Weightlifting Championships – Women's 63 kg =

The 2002 World Weightlifting Championships were held in Warsaw, Poland from 19 November to 26 November. The women's 63 kilograms division was staged on 21 November 2002.

== Schedule ==
Date	Time	Event
21 November 2002	12:00	Group B
21 November 2002	20:00	Group A

== Medalists ==
Event	Gold		Silver		Bronze	
Snatch	Liu Xia (CHN)	107.5 kg	Anastasia Tsakiri (GRE)	105.0 kg	Gergana Kirilova (BUL)	102.5 kg
Clean & Jerk	Anastasia Tsakiri (GRE)	135.0 kg	Liu Xia (CHN)	135.0 kg	Gergana Kirilova (BUL)	122.5 kg
Total	Liu Xia (CHN)	242.5 kg	Anastasia Tsakiri (GRE)	240.0 kg	Gergana Kirilova (BUL)	225.0 kg

== Records ==
Prior to this competition, the existing world records were as follows.

World Record	Snatch	Chen Xiaomin (CHN)	112.5 kg	Sydney, Australia	19 September 2000
World Record	Clean & Jerk	Liu Xia (CHN)	135.5 kg	Busan, South Korea	3 October 2002
World Record	Total	Chen Xiaomin (CHN)	242.5 kg	Sydney, Australia	19 September 2000

== Results ==
Rank	Athlete	Group	Body weight	Snatch (kg)				Clean & Jerk (kg)				Total
Rank	Athlete	Group	Body weight	1	2	3	Rank	1	2	3	Rank	Total
1st place, gold medalist(s)	Liu Xia (CHN)	A	62.90	100.0	105.0	107.5	1st place, gold medalist(s)	130.0	135.0	~~137.5~~	2nd place, silver medalist(s)	242.5
2nd place, silver medalist(s)	Anastasia Tsakiri (GRE)	A	62.45	102.5	105.0	~~107.5~~	2nd place, silver medalist(s)	125.0	132.5	136.0	1st place, gold medalist(s)	240.0
3rd place, bronze medalist(s)	Gergana Kirilova (BUL)	A	62.55	100.0	102.5	~~105.0~~	3rd place, bronze medalist(s)	120.0	122.5	~~125.0~~	3rd place, bronze medalist(s)	225.0
4	Olga Obrezkova (RUS)	A	62.60	~~102.5~~	102.5	~~107.5~~	4	112.5	117.5	~~122.5~~	6	220.0
5	Döndü Ay (TUR)	A	62.70	97.5	102.5	~~105.0~~	5	115.0	~~120.0~~	~~125.0~~	7	217.5
6	Zlatina Atanasova (BUL)	A	62.55	~~90.0~~	90.0	~~95.0~~	7	~~112.5~~	112.5	117.5	5	207.5
7	Leila Lassouani (ALG)	A	62.75	80.0	85.0	~~90.0~~	9	110.0	115.0	120.0	4	205.0
8	Tatsiana Stukalava (BLR)	A	61.95	85.0	90.0	~~92.5~~	6	105.0	~~110.0~~	~~110.0~~	9	195.0
9	Ubaldina Valoyes (COL)	A	62.95	~~82.5~~	82.5	~~87.5~~	10	105.0	~~110.0~~	110.0	8	192.5
10	Pascale Dorcelus (CAN)	B	62.80	82.5	~~87.5~~	87.5	8	95.0	~~100.0~~	~~100.0~~	12	182.5
11	Lessya Karasseva (KAZ)	B	62.65	~~75.0~~	75.0	80.0	11	~~95.0~~	95.0	~~100.0~~	11	175.0
12	Justyna Smosarska (POL)	B	62.25	70.0	75.0	77.5	12	90.0	95.0	~~97.5~~	10	172.5
13	Azahara López (ESP)	B	58.30	65.0	70.0	~~75.0~~	13	85.0	90.0	~~92.5~~	14	160.0
—	Danica Rue (USA)	A	62.35	~~80.0~~	~~80.0~~	~~80.0~~	—	—	—	—	—	—
—	Lydia Valentín (ESP)	B	62.35	~~80.0~~	~~80.0~~	~~80.0~~	—	~~92.5~~	92.5	~~100.0~~	13	—

== New records ==
Clean & Jerk	136.0 kg	Anastasia Tsakiri (GRE)	WR
