= 1996 World Weightlifting Championships – Women's 59 kg =

The 1996 World Weightlifting Championships were held in Warsaw, Poland from 3 May to 11 May. The women's competition in the 59 kilograms division was staged on 6 May.

== Medalists ==
Event	Gold		Silver		Bronze	
Snatch	Chen Xiaomin (CHN)	97.5 kg	Maria Christoforidou (GRE)	90.0 kg	Yuriko Takahashi (JPN)	85.0 kg
Clean & Jerk	Yuriko Takahashi (JPN)	112.5 kg	Chen Xiaomin (CHN)	110.0 kg	Maria Christoforidou (GRE)	107.5 kg
Total	Chen Xiaomin (CHN)	207.5 kg	Maria Christoforidou (GRE)	197.5 kg	Yuriko Takahashi (JPN)	197.5 kg

== Records ==
Prior to this competition, the existing world records were as follows.

World record	Snatch	Zou Feie (CHN)	98.5 kg	Istanbul, South Korea	21 November 1994
World record	Clean & Jerk	Chen Xiaomin (CHN)	123.5 kg	Guangzhou, China	20 November 1995
World record	Total	Chen Xiaomin (CHN)	220.0 kg	Hiroshima, Japan	4 October 1994

== Results ==
Rank	Athlete	Body weight	Snatch (kg)				Clean & Jerk (kg)				Total
Rank	Athlete	Body weight	1	2	3	Rank	1	2	3	Rank	Total
1st place, gold medalist(s)	Chen Xiaomin (CHN)	58.80	90.0	95.0	99.0	1st place, gold medalist(s)	107.5	110.0	—	2nd place, silver medalist(s)	207.5
2nd place, silver medalist(s)	Maria Christoforidou (GRE)	58.65	85.0	87.5	90.0	2nd place, silver medalist(s)	105.0	107.5	~~110.0~~	3rd place, bronze medalist(s)	197.5
3rd place, bronze medalist(s)	Yuriko Takahashi (JPN)	58.70	~~80.0~~	80.0	85.0	3rd place, bronze medalist(s)	107.5	110.0	112.5	1st place, gold medalist(s)	197.5
4	Nancy Niro (CAN)	58.90	77.5	82.5	~~87.5~~	4	100.0	105.0	~~110.0~~	5	187.5
5	Josefa Pérez (ESP)	58.65	75.0	77.5	~~80.0~~	5	90.0	95.0	97.5	6	175.0
6	Marie Korčiánová (CZE)	58.80	75.0	77.5	~~80.0~~	6	92.5	~~97.5~~	~~100.0~~	10	170.0
7	Lilia Musakaeva (RUS)	58.80	~~65.0~~	65.0	70.0	9	90.0	95.0	~~100.0~~	7	165.0
8	Beata Prei (POL)	58.45	65.0	67.5	70.0	8	90.0	~~92.5~~	92.5	9	162.5
9	Gina Hernández (COL)	57.55	67.5	72.5	~~75.0~~	7	77.5	~~82.5~~	~~82.5~~	13	150.0
10	Tuija Malinen (FIN)	58.40	67.5	~~70.0~~	~~70.0~~	10	80.0	82.5	~~85.0~~	11	150.0
11	Albena Yurukova (BUL)	58.80	65.0	~~70.0~~	—	11	80.0	~~85.0~~	—	12	145.0
—	Wu Mei-yi (TPE)	57.90	~~85.0~~	~~85.0~~	~~85.0~~	—	—	—	—	—	—
—	Gergana Kirilova (BUL)	58.65	~~85.0~~	~~85.0~~	~~85.0~~	—	~~105.0~~	105.0	107.5	4	—
—	Eleni Kyssidou (GRE)	58.95	~~75.0~~	~~75.0~~	~~75.0~~	—	90.0	~~95.0~~	95.0	8	—

== New records ==
Snatch	99.0 kg	Chen Xiaomin (CHN)	WR
