= 2002 World Weightlifting Championships – Women's 69 kg =

The 2002 World Weightlifting Championships were held in Warsaw, Poland from 19 November to 26 November. The women's 69 kilograms division was staged on 22 November 2002.

== Schedule ==
| Date | Time | Event |
|---|---|---|
| 22 November 2002 | 12:00 | Group B |
| 22 November 2002 | 17:00 | Group A |

== Medalists ==
| Event | Gold | | Silver | | Bronze | |
|---|---|---|---|---|---|---|
| Snatch | Valentina Popova (RUS) | 115.0 kg | Pawina Thongsuk (THA) | 112.5 kg | Nahla Ramadan (EGY) | 110.0 kg |
| Clean & Jerk | Pawina Thongsuk (THA) | 147.5 kg | Liu Chunhong (CHN) | 147.5 kg | Valentina Popova (RUS) | 142.5 kg |
| Total | Pawina Thongsuk (THA) | 260.0 kg | Valentina Popova (RUS) | 257.5 kg | Nahla Ramadan (EGY) | 245.0 kg |

== Records ==
Prior to this competition, the existing world records were as follows.

| World Record | Snatch | Liu Chunhong (CHN) | 115.5 kg | Busan, South Korea | 6 October 2002 |
| World Record | Clean & Jerk | Liu Chunhong (CHN) | 148.0 kg | Busan, South Korea | 6 October 2002 |
| World Record | Total | Liu Chunhong (CHN) | 262.5 kg | Busan, South Korea | 6 October 2002 |

== Results ==
| Rank | Athlete | Group | Body weight | Snatch (kg) | | | | Clean & Jerk (kg) | | | | Total |
| Rank | Athlete | Group | Body weight | 1 | 2 | 3 | Rank | 1 | 2 | 3 | Rank | Total |
|---|---|---|---|---|---|---|---|---|---|---|---|---|
| 1st place, gold medalist(s) | Pawina Thongsuk (THA) | A | 67.60 | 105.0 | 110.0 | 112.5 | 2nd place, silver medalist(s) | 140.0 | 145.0 | 147.5 | 1st place, gold medalist(s) | 260.0 |
| 2nd place, silver medalist(s) | Valentina Popova (RUS) | A | 68.25 | 112.5 | 115.0 | ~~117.5~~ | 1st place, gold medalist(s) | ~~142.5~~ | ~~142.5~~ | 142.5 | 3rd place, bronze medalist(s) | 257.5 |
| 3rd place, bronze medalist(s) | Nahla Ramadan (EGY) | A | 68.80 | 105.0 | 110.0 | ~~112.5~~ | 3rd place, bronze medalist(s) | ~~135.0~~ | ~~135.0~~ | 135.0 | 5 | 245.0 |
| 4 | Eszter Krutzler (HUN) | A | 68.45 | 105.0 | ~~110.0~~ | ~~110.0~~ | 5 | 130.0 | 135.0 | ~~140.0~~ | 4 | 240.0 |
| 5 | Vanda Maslovska (UKR) | A | 68.15 | 100.0 | 105.0 | 107.5 | 4 | 125.0 | 130.0 | ~~135.0~~ | 6 | 237.5 |
| 6 | Tulia Medina (COL) | A | 68.50 | 102.5 | ~~107.5~~ | ~~107.5~~ | 6 | 120.0 | ~~125.0~~ | 125.0 | 8 | 227.5 |
| 7 | Zarema Kasaeva (RUS) | A | 68.55 | 95.0 | 100.0 | ~~102.5~~ | 7 | 125.0 | ~~130.0~~ | ~~130.0~~ | 9 | 225.0 |
| 8 | Nora Köppel (ARG) | B | 68.10 | 95.0 | 97.5 | ~~100.0~~ | 8 | 120.0 | 125.0 | ~~130.0~~ | 7 | 222.5 |
| 9 | Ewa Kuraś (POL) | A | 68.85 | 95.0 | ~~100.0~~ | ~~100.0~~ | 10 | ~~120.0~~ | 120.0 | ~~125.0~~ | 10 | 215.0 |
| 10 | Cara Heads (USA) | B | 68.20 | 92.5 | 95.0 | ~~97.5~~ | 9 | 112.5 | ~~117.5~~ | ~~117.5~~ | 11 | 207.5 |
| 11 | Oxana Balanyuk (KAZ) | B | 68.70 | 87.5 | ~~92.5~~ | ~~92.5~~ | 12 | 105.0 | 107.5 | ~~110.0~~ | 13 | 195.0 |
| 12 | Hanna Keränen (FIN) | B | 68.50 | ~~85.0~~ | ~~85.0~~ | 85.0 | 13 | 100.0 | 107.5 | ~~115.0~~ | 12 | 192.5 |
| 13 | Tatiana Fernández (ESP) | B | 67.05 | 85.0 | 90.0 | ~~92.5~~ | 11 | 95.0 | 100.0 | ~~105.0~~ | 15 | 190.0 |
| 14 | Aiza Kutysheva (KAZ) | B | 65.55 | ~~80.0~~ | ~~80.0~~ | 80.0 | 14 | 100.0 | ~~105.0~~ | ~~105.0~~ | 14 | 180.0 |
| 15 | Marie-Josée Pépin (CAN) | B | 68.50 | 75.0 | ~~80.0~~ | ~~80.0~~ | 15 | 90.0 | ~~95.0~~ | ~~95.0~~ | 17 | 165.0 |
| — | Lucia Trojčáková (SVK) | B | 66.80 | ~~77.5~~ | ~~77.5~~ | ~~77.5~~ | — | ~~95.0~~ | 95.0 | ~~100.0~~ | 16 | — |
| — | Liu Chunhong (CHN) | A | 68.90 | ~~110.0~~ | ~~112.5~~ | ~~112.5~~ | — | 142.5 | 147.5 | ~~150.0~~ | 2nd place, silver medalist(s) | — |
