= 2001 World Weightlifting Championships – Women's 63 kg =

The 2001 World Weightlifting Championships were held in Antalya, Turkey from November 4 to November 11. The women's competition in 63 kilograms division was staged on 7 November 2001.

== Medalists ==
Event	Gold		Silver		Bronze	
Snatch	Xiao Ying (CHN)	105.0 kg	Anastasia Tsakiri (GRE)	102.5 kg	Kuo Ping-chun (TPE)	102.5 kg
Clean & Jerk	Anastasia Tsakiri (GRE)	125.0 kg	Kuo Ping-chun (TPE)	125.0 kg	Xiao Ying (CHN)	125.0 kg
Total	Xiao Ying (CHN)	230.0 kg	Anastasia Tsakiri (GRE)	227.5 kg	Kuo Ping-chun (TPE)	227.5 kg

== Records ==
Prior to this competition, the existing world records were as follows.

World Record	Snatch	Chen Xiaomin (CHN)	112.5 kg	Sydney, Australia	19 September 2000
World Record	Clean & Jerk	Nataliya Skakun (UKR)	133.0 kg	Thessaloniki, Greece	3 July 2001
World Record	Total	Chen Xiaomin (CHN)	242.5 kg	Sydney, Australia	19 September 2000

== Results ==
Rank	Athlete	Body weight	Snatch (kg)				Clean & Jerk (kg)				Total
Rank	Athlete	Body weight	1	2	3	Rank	1	2	3	Rank	Total
1st place, gold medalist(s)	Xiao Ying (CHN)	62.52	97.5	102.5	105.0	1st place, gold medalist(s)	122.5	125.0	~~127.5~~	3rd place, bronze medalist(s)	230.0
2nd place, silver medalist(s)	Anastasia Tsakiri (GRE)	61.44	97.5	100.0	102.5	2nd place, silver medalist(s)	120.0	125.0	~~127.5~~	1st place, gold medalist(s)	227.5
3rd place, bronze medalist(s)	Kuo Ping-chun (TPE)	61.94	95.0	100.0	102.5	3rd place, bronze medalist(s)	120.0	125.0	~~127.5~~	2nd place, silver medalist(s)	227.5
4	Dominika Misterska (POL)	62.48	95.0	~~97.5~~	97.5	6	120.0	~~125.0~~	~~127.5~~	4	217.5
5	Gergana Kirilova (BUL)	61.94	90.0	95.0	97.5	5	110.0	115.0	117.5	5	215.0
6	Döndü Ay (TUR)	62.60	~~100.0~~	~~100.0~~	100.0	4	115.0	~~122.5~~	~~127.5~~	7	215.0
7	Pratima Kumari (IND)	62.68	85.0	90.0	92.5	7	112.5	117.5	~~122.5~~	6	210.0
8	Olga Glaz (RUS)	62.70	87.5	~~92.5~~	92.5	8	112.5	~~117.5~~	~~117.5~~	8	205.0
9	Veronika Buroňová (CZE)	62.28	~~80.0~~	80.0	85.0	10	105.0	107.5	110.0	9	195.0
10	Tetyana Hlushak (UKR)	62.68	80.0	~~85.0~~	85.0	12	105.0	110.0	~~115.0~~	10	195.0
11	Pascale Dorcelus (CAN)	62.42	80.0	85.0	87.5	9	97.5	102.5	105.0	12	192.5
12	Luz Acosta (MEX)	62.34	85.0	~~90.0~~	~~90.0~~	11	105.0	~~110.0~~	~~110.0~~	11	190.0
13	Svetlana Dandukova (KAZ)	62.42	77.5	82.5	~~85.0~~	14	97.5	102.5	~~105.0~~	13	185.0
14	Josefa Pérez (ESP)	62.56	~~82.5~~	82.5	~~85.0~~	15	100.0	102.5	~~105.0~~	14	185.0
15	Yedid Orozco (MEX)	61.90	75.0	80.0	~~85.0~~	16	100.0	~~105.0~~	~~105.0~~	15	180.0
16	Annette Campbell (GBR)	61.10	77.5	82.5	~~85.0~~	13	92.5	95.0	~~97.5~~	16	177.5
17	Tatyana Koshevnikova (KAZ)	62.18	~~75.0~~	75.0	80.0	17	95.0	~~100.0~~	~~100.0~~	17	175.0
18	Leila Lassouani (ALG)	62.26	65.0	~~70.0~~	70.0	18	85.0	90.0	95.0	18	165.0
19	Michal Cooper (ISR)	62.40	62.5	67.5	~~72.5~~	20	80.0	~~87.5~~	87.5	19	155.0
20	Jennifer Maysmor-Gee (GBR)	61.72	62.5	67.5	~~70.0~~	19	82.5	~~87.5~~	~~87.5~~	20	150.0
