= Weightlifting at the 2002 Commonwealth Games – Women's 69 kg =

Weightlifting – Women's 69 kg at the 2002 Commonwealth Games
- Venue: Manchester International Convention Centre
- Dates: 2 August 2002
- Competitors: 10 from 9 nations
- Winning total weight: 230.0

Medalists
gold medal	Madeleine Yamechi	Cameroon
silver medal	Neelam Setti Laxmi	India
bronze medal	Sheba Deireragea	Nauru

The Women's 69 kg weightlifting event at the 2002 Commonwealth Games took place at the Manchester International Convention Centre on 2 August 2002. The weightlifter from Cameroon won the gold, lifting a total weight of 230 kg.

== Schedule ==
All times are Coordinated Universal Time (UTC)

Date	Time	Event
2 August 2002	15:00	Group A

== Records ==
Prior to this competition, the existing world, Commonwealth and Games records were as follows:

World record	Snatch	Valentina Popova (RUS)	115.0 kg	Antalya, Turkey	8 November 2001
World record	Clean & Jerk	Liu Chunhong (CHN)	147.5 kg	Havířov, Czech Republic	3 June 2002
World record	Total	Valentina Popova (RUS)	257.5 kg	Antalya, Turkey	8 November 2001
Commonwealth record	Snatch	Karnam Malleswari (IND)	110.0 kg	Sydney, Australia	19 September 2000
Commonwealth record	Clean & Jerk	Karnam Malleswari (IND)	130.0 kg	Sydney, Australia	19 September 2000
Commonwealth record	Total	Karnam Malleswari (IND)	240.0 kg	Sydney, Australia	19 September 2000
Games record	Snatch	First time held			
Games record	Clean & Jerk	First time held			
Games record	Total	First time held			

The following records were established during the competition:

Snatch	100.0 kg	Madeleine Yamechi (CMR)	GR
Clean & Jerk	130.0 kg	Madeleine Yamechi (CMR)	GR
Total	230.0 kg	Madeleine Yamechi (CMR)	GR

== Results ==
Rank	Athlete	Nation	Group	Body weight	Snatch (kg)					Clean & Jerk (kg)					Total
Rank	Athlete	Nation	Group	Body weight	1	2	3	Result	Rank	1	2	3	Result	Rank	Total
1st place, gold medalist(s)	Madeleine Yamechi	Cameroon	A	68.74	95.0	~~100.0~~	100.0	100.0	1st place, gold medalist(s)	120.0	130.0	–	130.0	1st place, gold medalist(s)	230.0
2nd place, silver medalist(s)	Neelam Setti Laxmi	India	A	66.90	90.0	95.0	~~97.5~~	95.0	2nd place, silver medalist(s)	110.0	~~115.0~~	~~120.0~~	110.0	2nd place, silver medalist(s)	205.0
3rd place, bronze medalist(s)	Sheba Deireragea	Nauru	A	68.17	90.0	~~95.0~~	~~95.0~~	90.0	3rd place, bronze medalist(s)	110.0	~~115.0~~	~~115.0~~	110.0	3rd place, bronze medalist(s)	200.0
4	Amanda Phillips	Australia	A	68.13	77.5	80.0	82.5	82.5	4	102.5	105.0	107.5	107.5	4	190.0
5	Sharon Oakley	England	A	67.91	80.0	~~85.0~~	~~85.0~~	80.0	5	97.5	102.5	~~105.0~~	102.5	5	182.5
6	Juliana Auguste	England	A	68.24	~~70.0~~	70.0	~~75.0~~	70.0	6	90.0	~~92.5~~	92.5	92.5	6	162.5
7	Amorkor Ollennu-King	Ghana	A	68.65	62.5	65.0	67.5	67.5	7	82.5	87.5	~~90.0~~	87.5	7	155.0
8	Shondell King	Guyana	A	68.82	~~65.0~~	65.0	~~70.0~~	65.0	9	~~80.0~~	80.0	87.5	87.5	8	152.5
9	Hekure Joe	Papua New Guinea	A	68.75	62.5	65.0	~~70.0~~	65.0	8	85.0	~~87.5~~	~~87.5~~	85.0	9	150.0
–	Janet Thelermont	Seychelles	A	68.66	~~85.0~~	~~90.0~~	~~90.0~~	–	–	–	–	–	–	–	–
