= Yeong-ok =

Korean given name (영옥)

- Hangul: 영옥
- RR: Yeongok
- MR: Yŏngok
- IPA: [jʌŋok]

Yeong-ok, also spelled Young-ok or Yong-ok, is a Korean given name.

People with this name include:

== Sportspeople ==
- Kim Young-ok (speed skater) (born 1962), South Korean female speed skater
- Kim Yong-ok (weightlifter) (born 1976), North Korean female weightlifter
- Kim Yeong-ok (born 1974), South Korean female basketball player
- Jong Yong-ok (born 1981), North Korean female long distance runner
- Hong Yong-ok (born 1986), North Korean female weightlifter
- Pak Yong-ok (fl. 1976–1980), North Korean female table tennis player

== Other ==
- Young-Oak Kim (1919–2005), Korean-born American male soldier
- Kim Young-ok (actress) (born 1937), South Korean actress
- Kim Soo-mi (born Kim Young-ok, 1949), South Korean actress known for her role in Country Diaries
- Shin Youngok (born 1961), South Korean female lyric coloratura soprano
- Young Kim (born Choe Young-oak, 1962), South Korean-born American female politician

== See also ==
- List of Korean given names
