= Kim Young-ok (disambiguation) =

- Hangul: 김영옥
- RR: Gim Yeongok
- MR: Kim Yŏngok

Kim Young-ok, a Korean name consisting of the family name Kim and the given name Young-ok, may refer to:

- Kim Young-ok (born 1937), South Korean actress
- Kim Young-ok (speed skater) (born 1966), South Korean female speed skater
- Young-Oak Kim (1919–2005), Korean American male soldier
- Kim Soo-mi (born Kim Young-ok; 1949), South Korean actress
- Young Kim (Korean name Kim Young-oak; née Choe, born 1962), Korean American female politician
- Kim Yeong-ok (born 1974), South Korean women's basketball player
- Kim Yong-ok (weightlifter) (born 1976), North Korean female weightlifter

== See also ==
- Kim Yong-ok (disambiguation) (김용옥)
