= Weightlifting at the 2004 Summer Olympics – Women's 75 kg =

Weightlifting at the Olympics

Women's 75 kg at the Games of the XXVIII Olympiad
- Venue: Nikaia Olympic Weightlifting Hall
- Date: 19–20 August 2004
- Competitors: 16 from 15 nations

Medalists
1st place, gold medalist(s)		Pawina Thongsuk	Thailand
2nd place, silver medalist(s)		Natalya Zabolotnaya	Russia
3rd place, bronze medalist(s)		Valentina Popova	Russia

The women's 75 kilograms weightlifting event at the 2004 Summer Olympics in Athens, Greece took place at the Nikaia Olympic Weightlifting Hall between 19 and 20 August.

Total score was the sum of the lifter's best result in each of the snatch and the clean and jerk, with three lifts allowed for each lift. In case of a tie, the lighter lifter won; if still tied, the lifter who took the fewest attempts to achieve the total score won. Lifters without a valid snatch score did not perform the clean and jerk.

== Schedule ==
All times are Eastern European Summer Time (UTC+03:00)

Date	Time	Event
19 August 2004	13:00	Group B
20 August 2004	20:00	Group A

== Records ==
{{{caption}}}
World Record	Snatch	Tatyana Khromova (KAZ)	120.0 kg	Almaty, Kazakhstan	10 April 2004
World Record	Clean & Jerk	Sun Ruiping (CHN)	152.5 kg	Busan, South Korea	7 October 2002
World Record	Total	Sun Ruiping (CHN)	270.0 kg	Busan, South Korea	7 October 2002
Olympic Record	Snatch	Olympic Standard	115.0 kg	—	1 January 1997
Olympic Record	Clean & Jerk	Olympic Standard	142.5 kg	—	1 January 1997
Olympic Record	Total	Olympic Standard	257.5 kg	—	1 January 1997

== Results ==
Rank	Athlete	Group	Body weight	Snatch (kg)				Clean & Jerk (kg)				Total
Rank	Athlete	Group	Body weight	1	2	3	Result	1	2	3	Result	Total
1st place, gold medalist(s)	Pawina Thongsuk (THA)	A	69.29	115.0	120.0	122.5	122.5	145.0	150.0	~~153.0~~	150.0	272.5
2nd place, silver medalist(s)	Natalya Zabolotnaya (RUS)	A	74.09	120.0	125.0	~~127.5~~	125.0	142.5	147.5	~~152.5~~	147.5	272.5
3rd place, bronze medalist(s)	Valentina Popova (RUS)	A	72.89	117.5	120.5	~~122.5~~	120.0	145.0	~~150.0~~	~~155.0~~	145.0	265.0
4	Gyöngyi Likerecz (HUN)	A	74.19	~~115.0~~	115.0	~~120.0~~	115.0	142.5	~~145.0~~	~~147.5~~	142.5	257.5
5	Christina Ioannidi (GRE)	A	73.31	107.5	112.5	~~115.0~~	112.5	142.5	~~147.5~~	~~147.5~~	142.5	255.0
6	Tatyana Khromova (KAZ)	A	74.51	112.5	117.5	~~120.0~~	117.5	~~135.0~~	135.0	~~140.0~~	135.0	252.5
7	Kim Soon-hee (KOR)	A	74.25	107.5	112.5	~~115.0~~	112.5	~~137.5~~	137.5	~~145.0~~	137.5	250.0
8	Tulia Medina (COL)	A	70.96	105.0	110.0	112.5	112.5	127.5	132.5	~~135.0~~	132.5	245.0
9	Nora Köppel (ARG)	B	73.01	100.0	~~105.0~~	~~105.0~~	100.0	130.0	137.5	~~142.5~~	137.5	237.5
10	Wanda Rijo (DOM)	B	74.56	105.0	~~110.0~~	110.0	110.0	127.5	~~132.5~~	~~132.5~~	127.5	237.5
11	Eva Dimas (ESA)	B	74.31	100.0	105.0	~~107.5~~	105.0	120.0	125.0	~~130.0~~	125.0	230.0
12	Damaris Aguirre (MEX)	B	73.90	95.0	~~100.0~~	100.0	100.0	115.0	120.0	122.5	122.5	222.5
13	Deborah Lovely (AUS)	B	74.71	~~92.5~~	92.5	~~97.5~~	92.5	110.0	115.0	~~120.0~~	115.0	207.5
14	Marie Jesika Dalou (MRI)	B	74.12	52.5	~~57.5~~	57.5	57.5	72.5	~~77.5~~	~~77.5~~	72.5	130.0
—	Nahla Ramadan (EGY)	A	74.44	117.5	120.0	~~122.5~~	120.0	~~145.0~~	~~145.0~~	~~147.5~~	—	—
—	Huang Shih-chun (TPE)	B	73.84	~~110.0~~	~~110.0~~	~~112.5~~	—	—	—	—	—	—

== New records ==
Snatch	117.5 kg	Nahla Ramadan (EGY)	OR
Snatch	120.0 kg	Natalya Zabolotnaya (RUS)	OR
Snatch	120.5 kg	Valentina Popova (RUS)	WR
Snatch	122.5 kg	Pawina Thongsuk (THA)	WR
Snatch	125.0 kg	Natalya Zabolotnaya (RUS)	WR
Clean & Jerk	145.0 kg	Valentina Popova (RUS)	OR
Clean & Jerk	147.5 kg	Natalya Zabolotnaya (RUS)	OR
Clean & Jerk	150.0 kg	Pawina Thongsuk (THA)	OR
Total	267.5 kg	Natalya Zabolotnaya (RUS)	OR
Total	272.5 kg	Natalya Zabolotnaya (RUS)	WR
