= 1999 World Weightlifting Championships – Women's 63 kg =

The Women's Middleweight Weightlifting Event (63 kg) is the fourth women's weight class event at the weightlifting competition, limited to competitors with a maximum of 63 kilograms of body mass. The competition at the 1999 World Weightlifting Championships took place in Athens, Greece on 23 November 1999.

Each lifter performed in both the snatch and clean and jerk lifts, with the final score being the sum of the lifter's best result in each. The athlete received three attempts in each of the two lifts; the score for the lift was the heaviest weight successfully lifted.

== Medalists ==
| Event | Gold | | Silver | | Bronze | |
|---|---|---|---|---|---|---|
| Snatch | Chen Jui-lien (TPE) | 107.5 kg | Valentina Popova (RUS) | 105.0 kg | Xiong Meiying (CHN) | 105.0 kg |
| Clean & Jerk | Chen Jui-lien (TPE) | 132.5 kg | Xiong Meiying (CHN) | 132.5 kg | Ioanna Chatziioannou (GRE) | 127.5 kg |
| Total | Chen Jui-lien (TPE) | 240.0 kg | Xiong Meiying (CHN) | 237.5 kg | Valentina Popova (RUS) | 232.5 kg |

== Records ==
Prior to this competition, the existing world records were as follows.

| World Record | Snatch | Lei Li (CHN) | 110.0 kg | Chiba, Japan | 2 May 1999 |
| World Record | Clean & Jerk | Lei Li (CHN) | 129.0 kg | Chiba, Japan | 2 May 1999 |
| World Record | Total | Lei Li (CHN) | 237.5 kg | Chiba, Japan | 2 May 1999 |

== Results ==
| Rank | Athlete | Body weight | Snatch (kg) | | | | Clean & Jerk (kg) | | | | Total |
| Rank | Athlete | Body weight | 1 | 2 | 3 | Rank | 1 | 2 | 3 | Rank | Total |
|---|---|---|---|---|---|---|---|---|---|---|---|
| 1st place, gold medalist(s) | Chen Jui-lien (TPE) | 62.17 | 105.0 | 107.5 | ~~110.5~~ | 1st place, gold medalist(s) | 125.0 | 130.0 | 132.5 | 1st place, gold medalist(s) | 240.0 |
| 2nd place, silver medalist(s) | Xiong Meiying (CHN) | 62.83 | ~~105.0~~ | 105.0 | ~~110.0~~ | 3rd place, bronze medalist(s) | 127.5 | 132.5 | ~~135.0~~ | 2nd place, silver medalist(s) | 237.5 |
| 3rd place, bronze medalist(s) | Valentina Popova (RUS) | 62.69 | 100.0 | ~~105.0~~ | 105.0 | 2nd place, silver medalist(s) | 122.5 | 125.0 | 127.5 | 4 | 232.5 |
| 4 | Karnam Malleswari (IND) | 62.72 | 102.5 | ~~107.5~~ | ~~107.5~~ | 4 | 120.0 | 127.5 | ~~132.5~~ | 5 | 230.0 |
| 5 | Ioanna Chatziioannou (GRE) | 62.01 | 95.0 | ~~100.0~~ | ~~100.0~~ | 5 | 120.0 | 125.0 | 127.5 | 3rd place, bronze medalist(s) | 222.5 |
| 6 | Saipin Detsaeng (THA) | 62.65 | ~~95.0~~ | 95.0 | ~~102.5~~ | 6 | 120.0 | ~~125.0~~ | ~~127.5~~ | 7 | 215.0 |
| 7 | Kim Yong-ok (PRK) | 60.92 | 90.0 | ~~97.5~~ | ~~97.5~~ | 8 | ~~120.0~~ | ~~120.0~~ | 120.0 | 6 | 210.0 |
| 8 | Dominika Misterska (POL) | 61.16 | 90.0 | ~~95.0~~ | ~~95.0~~ | 9 | 115.0 | ~~120.0~~ | ~~122.5~~ | 9 | 205.0 |
| 9 | Eszter Krutzler (HUN) | 61.64 | 87.5 | 90.0 | 92.5 | 7 | 107.5 | ~~112.5~~ | ~~112.5~~ | 14 | 200.0 |
| 10 | Josefa Pérez (ESP) | 62.44 | 85.0 | 87.5 | 90.0 | 10 | 102.5 | 107.5 | ~~110.0~~ | 16 | 197.5 |
| 11 | Miel McGerrigle (CAN) | 60.45 | 85.0 | 87.5 | ~~90.0~~ | 12 | 107.5 | ~~112.5~~ | ~~112.5~~ | 12 | 195.0 |
| 12 | Yumiko Kobayashi (JPN) | 62.23 | 80.0 | ~~85.0~~ | 85.0 | 17 | 105.0 | 110.0 | ~~112.5~~ | 10 | 195.0 |
| 13 | Yoon I-sook (KOR) | 62.83 | 85.0 | 90.0 | ~~92.5~~ | 11 | 105.0 | ~~110.0~~ | ~~110.0~~ | 18 | 195.0 |
| 14 | Gretty Lugo (VEN) | 59.80 | 82.5 | ~~85.0~~ | 85.0 | 14 | ~~102.5~~ | 102.5 | ~~107.5~~ | 11 | 192.5 |
| 15 | Tina Chima (NGR) | 61.12 | 75.0 | ~~80.0~~ | — | 25 | 107.5 | 112.5 | 117.5 | 8 | 192.5 |
| 16 | Gergana Kirilova (BUL) | 62.15 | ~~85.0~~ | 85.0 | ~~90.0~~ | 16 | 102.5 | ~~107.5~~ | 107.5 | 15 | 192.5 |
| 17 | Alejandra Perea (COL) | 61.23 | 82.5 | ~~87.5~~ | ~~87.5~~ | 20 | 102.5 | 107.5 | ~~110.0~~ | 13 | 190.0 |
| 18 | Aneta Szczepańska (POL) | 61.81 | 85.0 | ~~87.5~~ | ~~87.5~~ | 15 | 105.0 | ~~110.0~~ | ~~110.0~~ | 17 | 190.0 |
| 19 | Sención Quezada (DOM) | 62.69 | 80.0 | 85.0 | 87.5 | 13 | 102.5 | ~~107.5~~ | ~~107.5~~ | 19 | 190.0 |
| 20 | Katia Iacuzzo (ITA) | 62.54 | 80.0 | 85.0 | ~~87.5~~ | 19 | 100.0 | ~~105.0~~ | ~~105.0~~ | 20 | 185.0 |
| 21 | Claudia Müller (GER) | 62.48 | 77.5 | ~~80.0~~ | ~~80.0~~ | 21 | 97.5 | ~~102.5~~ | ~~102.5~~ | 21 | 175.0 |
| 22 | Heidi Kanervisto (FIN) | 62.92 | ~~75.0~~ | 75.0 | 77.5 | 24 | 92.5 | 95.0 | ~~97.5~~ | 23 | 172.5 |
| 23 | Jay Saxton (AUS) | 62.55 | 75.0 | ~~80.0~~ | ~~80.0~~ | 26 | 95.0 | ~~100.0~~ | ~~102.5~~ | 22 | 170.0 |
| 24 | Svitlana Sinishyna (UKR) | 62.60 | 70.0 | 75.0 | 77.5 | 22 | 90.0 | ~~95.0~~ | ~~95.0~~ | 25 | 167.5 |
| 25 | Luz Acosta (MEX) | 62.63 | 75.0 | 77.5 | ~~80.0~~ | 23 | 90.0 | ~~95.0~~ | ~~95.0~~ | 26 | 167.5 |
| 26 | Aiza Kutysheva (KAZ) | 61.34 | 67.5 | ~~72.5~~ | 72.5 | 27 | 80.0 | 85.0 | 87.5 | 27 | 160.0 |
| 27 | Monika Solcianská (SVK) | 61.81 | 62.5 | ~~67.5~~ | 67.5 | 33 | 85.0 | 90.0 | ~~95.0~~ | 24 | 157.5 |
| 28 | Kesaia Tawai (FIJ) | 63.00 | ~~72.5~~ | 72.5 | ~~77.5~~ | 30 | 85.0 | ~~90.0~~ | ~~90.0~~ | 30 | 157.5 |
| 29 | María Gómez (MEX) | 62.43 | 72.5 | ~~75.0~~ | ~~75.0~~ | 28 | 82.5 | ~~85.0~~ | ~~85.0~~ | 31 | 155.0 |
| 30 | Yvonne van der Stoep (NED) | 62.59 | 60.0 | 67.5 | ~~70.0~~ | 34 | 80.0 | 85.0 | ~~90.0~~ | 29 | 152.5 |
| 31 | Mette Pedersen (DEN) | 62.65 | 67.5 | 70.0 | 72.5 | 29 | ~~80.0~~ | 80.0 | ~~85.0~~ | 34 | 152.5 |
| 32 | Lucia Trojčáková (SVK) | 62.54 | 65.0 | 70.0 | ~~72.5~~ | 31 | ~~80.0~~ | 80.0 | ~~82.5~~ | 33 | 150.0 |
| 33 | Samira Chaiter (ALG) | 62.96 | ~~65.0~~ | 65.0 | ~~70.0~~ | 35 | 82.5 | ~~87.5~~ | ~~87.5~~ | 32 | 147.5 |
| 34 | Jonna Lomma (FIN) | 60.41 | ~~65.0~~ | 65.0 | 67.5 | 32 | 72.5 | 75.0 | ~~77.5~~ | 36 | 142.5 |
| 35 | Rikke Moosdorf (DEN) | 62.48 | ~~60.0~~ | 60.0 | ~~62.5~~ | 36 | 72.5 | 67.5 | ~~80.0~~ | 35 | 137.5 |
| — | Laure Mary (FRA) | 62.40 | 82.5 | 85.0 | ~~87.5~~ | 18 | ~~105.0~~ | ~~105.0~~ | ~~105.0~~ | — | — |
| — | Janice López (PUR) | 61.75 | ~~70.0~~ | ~~70.0~~ | ~~70.0~~ | — | 85.0 | ~~90.0~~ | ~~95.0~~ | 28 | — |

== New records ==
| Clean & Jerk | 130.0 kg | Chen Jui-lien (TPE) | WR |
| Clean & Jerk | 132.5 kg | Xiong Meiying (CHN) | WR |
| Total | 240.0 kg | Chen Jui-lien (TPE) | WR |
