= 1996 World Weightlifting Championships – Women's 64 kg =

The 1996 World Weightlifting Championships were held in Warsaw, Poland from 3 May to 11 May. The women's competition in the 64 kilograms division was staged on 7 May.

== Medalists ==
Event	Gold		Silver		Bronze	
Snatch	Li Hongyun (CHN)	105.0 kg	Chen Jui-lien (TPE)	100.0 kg	Bénédicte Comblez (FRA)	90.0 kg
Clean & Jerk	Li Hongyun (CHN)	120.0 kg	Chen Jui-lien (TPE)	115.0 kg	Choi Eun-ja (KOR)	115.0 kg
Total	Li Hongyun (CHN)	225.0 kg	Chen Jui-lien (TPE)	215.0 kg	Huang Hsi-li (TPE)	202.5 kg

== Records ==
Prior to this competition, the existing world records were as follows.

World record	Snatch	Chen Yunlien (CHN)	105.5 kg	Yachiyo, Japan	6 April 1996
World record	Clean & Jerk	Li Hongyun (CHN)	130.0 kg	Istanbul, Turkey	22 November 1994
World record	Total	Li Hongyun (CHN)	235.0 kg	Istanbul, Turkey	22 November 1994

== Results ==
Rank	Athlete	Body weight	Snatch (kg)				Clean & Jerk (kg)				Total
Rank	Athlete	Body weight	1	2	3	Rank	1	2	3	Rank	Total
1st place, gold medalist(s)	Li Hongyun (CHN)	63.75	97.5	102.5	106.0	1st place, gold medalist(s)	117.5	120.0	—	1st place, gold medalist(s)	225.0
2nd place, silver medalist(s)	Chen Jui-lien (TPE)	62.50	95.0	100.0	~~102.5~~	2nd place, silver medalist(s)	~~115.0~~	115.0	~~120.0~~	2nd place, silver medalist(s)	215.0
3rd place, bronze medalist(s)	Huang Hsi-li (TPE)	63.95	~~90.0~~	90.0	~~92.5~~	4	112.5	~~115.0~~	~~115.0~~	4	202.5
4	Bénédicte Comblez (FRA)	62.10	90.0	—	—	3rd place, bronze medalist(s)	110.0	—	—	5	200.0
5	Choi Eun-ja (KOR)	62.90	85.0	~~90.0~~	~~90.0~~	7	~~115.0~~	115.0	~~117.5~~	3rd place, bronze medalist(s)	200.0
6	Tatiana Tezikova (RUS)	63.00	~~85.0~~	85.0	~~90.0~~	8	105.0	110.0	~~112.5~~	6	195.0
7	Jeevan Jyoti (IND)	63.95	~~82.5~~	82.5	85.0	9	~~110.0~~	110.0	~~115.0~~	7	195.0
8	L. Anita Chanu (IND)	63.10	82.5	~~87.5~~	87.5	5	105.0	~~110.0~~	~~110.0~~	9	192.5
9	Ioanna Chatziioannou (GRE)	62.55	82.5	~~85.0~~	85.0	6	105.0	~~110.0~~	~~110.0~~	8	190.0
10	Lea Rentmeester (USA)	64.00	82.5	85.0	~~87.5~~	10	100.0	105.0	~~110.0~~	10	190.0
11	Katia Iacuzzo (ITA)	63.85	75.0	80.0	82.5	11	95.0	100.0	~~102.5~~	12	182.5
12	Sharon Oakley (GBR)	63.45	77.5	~~80.0~~	80.0	12	100.0	~~102.5~~	~~102.5~~	11	180.0
13	Stephanie Bodie (USA)	64.00	~~75.0~~	75.0	77.5	13	95.0	~~100.0~~	~~100.0~~	14	172.5
14	Tatiana Stavcalova (BLR)	62.05	70.0	~~72.5~~	72.5	14	90.0	92.5	~~95.0~~	15	165.0
—	Aneta Szczepańska (POL)	63.05	~~77.5~~	~~77.5~~	~~77.5~~	—	95.0	~~100.0~~	~~100.0~~	13	—
DQ	Milena Trendafilova (BUL)	63.35	90.0	~~92.5~~	~~92.5~~	—	~~110.0~~	112.5	~~115.0~~	—	—

== New records ==
Snatch	106.0 kg	Li Hongyun (CHN)	WR
