= 2002 World Weightlifting Championships – Women's 75 kg =

The 2002 World Weightlifting Championships were held in Warsaw, Poland from 19 November to 26 November. The women's 69 kilograms division was staged on 22 and 23 November 2002.

== Schedule ==
Date	Time	Event
22 November 2002	12:00	Group B
23 November 2002	14:00	Group A

== Medalists ==
Event	Gold		Silver		Bronze	
Snatch	Svetlana Khabirova (RUS)	117.5 kg	Sun Ruiping (CHN)	115.0 kg	Ilona Dankó (HUN)	107.5 kg
Clean & Jerk	Svetlana Khabirova (RUS)	145.0 kg	Sun Ruiping (CHN)	145.0 kg	Christina Ioannidi (GRE)	132.5 kg
Total	Svetlana Khabirova (RUS)	262.5 kg	Sun Ruiping (CHN)	260.0 kg	Christina Ioannidi (GRE)	235.0 kg

== Records ==
Prior to this competition, the existing world records were as follows.

World Record	Snatch	Sun Ruiping (CHN)	118.5 kg	Busan, South Korea	7 October 2002
World Record	Clean & Jerk	Sun Ruiping (CHN)	152.5 kg	Busan, South Korea	7 October 2002
World Record	Total	Sun Ruiping (CHN)	270.0 kg	Busan, South Korea	7 October 2002

== Results ==
Rank	Athlete	Group	Body weight	Snatch (kg)				Clean & Jerk (kg)				Total
Rank	Athlete	Group	Body weight	1	2	3	Rank	1	2	3	Rank	Total
1st place, gold medalist(s)	Svetlana Khabirova (RUS)	A	72.20	110.0	115.0	117.5	1st place, gold medalist(s)	~~140.0~~	140.0	145.0	1st place, gold medalist(s)	262.5
2nd place, silver medalist(s)	Sun Ruiping (CHN)	A	74.70	~~110.0~~	110.0	115.0	2nd place, silver medalist(s)	140.0	145.0	~~150.0~~	2nd place, silver medalist(s)	260.0
3rd place, bronze medalist(s)	Christina Ioannidi (GRE)	A	74.60	102.5	~~107.5~~	~~107.5~~	5	127.5	132.5	~~137.5~~	3rd place, bronze medalist(s)	235.0
4	Ilona Dankó (HUN)	A	74.65	107.5	~~112.5~~	~~115.0~~	3rd place, bronze medalist(s)	127.5	~~132.5~~	~~132.5~~	4	235.0
5	Katalin Laczi (HUN)	A	74.25	97.5	~~100.0~~	~~100.0~~	7	~~125.0~~	125.0	~~130.0~~	5	222.5
6	Aysel Özgür (TUR)	A	74.55	~~105.0~~	105.0	~~110.0~~	4	115.0	~~122.5~~	~~122.5~~	8	220.0
7	Kateryna Byelik (UKR)	A	73.55	95.0	~~100.0~~	100.0	6	117.5	~~122.5~~	~~122.5~~	7	217.5
8	Kazue Imahoko (JPN)	A	74.60	92.5	97.5	~~100.0~~	8	107.5	112.5	~~117.5~~	9	210.0
9	Deborah Lovely (AUS)	B	74.75	90.0	92.5	~~95.0~~	9	105.0	110.0	112.5	10	205.0
10	Antra Petruņa (LAT)	B	69.65	~~80.0~~	~~80.0~~	82.5	11	~~105.0~~	105.0	110.0	11	192.5
11	Josefa Pérez (ESP)	B	69.75	~~85.0~~	~~85.0~~	85.0	10	102.5	105.0	~~107.5~~	12	190.0
—	Radomíra Ševčíková (CZE)	A	74.90	~~95.0~~	~~95.0~~	~~95.0~~	—	115.0	122.5	~~127.5~~	6	—
DQ	Ludmila Arefieva (RUS)	A	73.05	105.0	110.0	112.5	—	125.0	~~130.0~~	~~130.0~~	—	—
