= 2001 World Weightlifting Championships – Women's 69 kg =

The 2001 World Weightlifting Championships were held in Antalya, Turkey from November 4 to November 11. The women's competition in 69 kg division was staged on 8 November 2001.

== Medalists ==
Event	Gold		Silver		Bronze	
Snatch	Valentina Popova (RUS)	115.0 kg	Eszter Krutzler (HUN)	110.0 kg	Svetlana Khabirova (RUS)	110.0 kg
Clean & Jerk	Valentina Popova (RUS)	142.5 kg	Svetlana Khabirova (RUS)	140.0 kg	Eszter Krutzler (HUN)	130.0 kg
Total	Valentina Popova (RUS)	257.5 kg	Svetlana Khabirova (RUS)	250.0 kg	Eszter Krutzler (HUN)	240.0 kg

== Records ==
Prior to this competition, the existing world records were as follows.

World Record	Snatch	Valentina Popova (RUS)	113.5 kg	Brisbane, Australia	1 September 2001
World Record	Clean & Jerk	Valentina Popova (RUS)	143.5 kg	Brisbane, Australia	1 September 2001
World Record	Total	Valentina Popova (RUS)	255.0 kg	Brisbane, Australia	1 September 2001

== Results ==
Rank	Athlete	Body weight	Snatch (kg)				Clean & Jerk (kg)				Total
Rank	Athlete	Body weight	1	2	3	Rank	1	2	3	Rank	Total
1st place, gold medalist(s)	Valentina Popova (RUS)	67.98	107.5	112.5	115.0	1st place, gold medalist(s)	135.0	142.5	—	1st place, gold medalist(s)	257.5
2nd place, silver medalist(s)	Svetlana Khabirova (RUS)	68.26	105.0	107.5	110.0	3rd place, bronze medalist(s)	130.0	135.0	140.0	2nd place, silver medalist(s)	250.0
3rd place, bronze medalist(s)	Eszter Krutzler (HUN)	67.04	105.0	107.5	110.0	2nd place, silver medalist(s)	130.0	~~135.0~~	~~135.0~~	3rd place, bronze medalist(s)	240.0
4	Huang Shih-chun (TPE)	68.12	~~102.5~~	~~102.5~~	105.0	4	~~122.5~~	122.5	127.5	5	232.5
5	Maria Tatsi (GRE)	67.80	~~95.0~~	~~95.0~~	95.0	9	125.0	130.0	~~132.5~~	4	225.0
6	Vanda Maslovska (UKR)	67.90	95.0	100.0	~~105.0~~	5	120.0	125.0	~~130.0~~	7	225.0
7	Tulia Medina (COL)	68.36	~~97.5~~	97.5	100.0	6	~~115.0~~	115.0	120.0	9	220.0
8	Madeleine Yamechi (CMR)	68.52	92.5	~~97.5~~	~~97.5~~	10	120.0	125.0	~~127.5~~	8	217.5
9	Madiha Abdelmoneim (EGY)	68.78	92.5	95.0	97.5	8	120.0	~~125.0~~	~~125.0~~	10	217.5
10	Sibel Şimşek (TUR)	68.32	92.5	97.5	~~100.0~~	7	~~115.0~~	~~115.0~~	115.0	12	212.5
11	Katalin Laczi (HUN)	68.96	90.0	~~95.0~~	~~95.0~~	11	115.0	120.0	—	11	210.0
12	Cinthya Domínguez (MEX)	68.28	85.0	~~87.5~~	87.5	12	102.5	~~107.5~~	107.5	14	195.0
13	Katerina Rezynova (UKR)	65.18	~~82.5~~	~~82.5~~	82.5	15	105.0	107.5	110.0	13	192.5
14	Hanna Keränen (FIN)	68.80	85.0	~~87.5~~	87.5	13	100.0	105.0	~~110.0~~	17	192.5
15	Aiza Kutysheva (KAZ)	67.86	80.0	85.0	~~87.5~~	14	100.0	~~105.0~~	105.0	16	190.0
16	Teresa Ernster (NED)	65.66	~~77.5~~	~~80.0~~	80.0	17	97.5	102.5	105.0	15	185.0
17	Lessya Karasseva (KAZ)	66.14	72.5	77.5	82.5	16	92.5	97.5	~~100.0~~	18	180.0
18	Michelle York (GBR)	64.42	67.5	70.0	~~72.5~~	18	80.0	85.0	~~87.5~~	19	155.0
—	Yu Honglian (CHN)	67.82	~~105.0~~	~~105.0~~	~~105.0~~	—	125.0	~~130.0~~	~~130.0~~	6	—

== New records ==
Snatch	115.0 kg	Valentina Popova (RUS)	WR
Total	257.5 kg	Valentina Popova (RUS)	WR
