= 2003 World Weightlifting Championships – Women's 69 kg =

The 2003 World Weightlifting Championships were held in Vancouver, Canada from 14 November to 22 November. The women's 69 kilograms division was staged on 19 November 2003.

== Schedule ==
Date	Time	Event
19 November 2003	12:30	Group B
19 November 2003	17:30	Group A

== Medalists ==
Event	Gold		Silver		Bronze	
Snatch	Liu Chunhong (CHN)	120.0 kg	Valentina Popova (RUS)	117.5 kg	Eszter Krutzler (HUN)	117.5 kg
Clean & Jerk	Liu Chunhong (CHN)	150.0 kg	Eszter Krutzler (HUN)	145.0 kg	Valentina Popova (RUS)	140.0 kg
Total	Liu Chunhong (CHN)	270.0 kg	Eszter Krutzler (HUN)	262.5 kg	Valentina Popova (RUS)	257.5 kg

== Records ==
Prior to this competition, the existing world records were as follows.

World Record	Snatch	Liu Chunhong (CHN)	117.5 kg	Qinhuangdao, China	12 September 2003
World Record	Clean & Jerk	Liu Chunhong (CHN)	148.5 kg	Qinhuangdao, China	12 September 2003
World Record	Total	Liu Chunhong (CHN)	265.0 kg	Qinhuangdao, China	12 September 2003

== Results ==
Rank	Athlete	Group	Body weight	Snatch (kg)				Clean & Jerk (kg)				Total
Rank	Athlete	Group	Body weight	1	2	3	Rank	1	2	3	Rank	Total
1st place, gold medalist(s)	Liu Chunhong (CHN)	A	68.47	115.0	118.0	120.0	1st place, gold medalist(s)	142.5	147.5	150.0	1st place, gold medalist(s)	270.0
2nd place, silver medalist(s)	Eszter Krutzler (HUN)	A	68.76	107.5	112.5	117.5	3rd place, bronze medalist(s)	135.0	140.0	145.0	2nd place, silver medalist(s)	262.5
3rd place, bronze medalist(s)	Valentina Popova (RUS)	A	68.09	~~112.5~~	112.5	117.5	2nd place, silver medalist(s)	~~140.0~~	140.0	~~145.0~~	3rd place, bronze medalist(s)	257.5
4	Pawina Thongsuk (THA)	A	68.11	~~115.0~~	~~115.0~~	115.0	4	~~140.0~~	140.0	~~145.0~~	4	255.0
5	Zarema Kasaeva (RUS)	A	68.16	107.5	110.0	112.5	5	132.5	~~137.5~~	~~137.5~~	5	245.0
6	Tulia Medina (COL)	A	68.62	105.0	110.0	112.5	6	~~125.0~~	125.0	130.0	9	242.5
7	Vanda Maslovska (UKR)	A	67.85	105.0	110.0	~~115.0~~	7	130.0	~~135.0~~	~~135.0~~	8	240.0
8	Milena Trendafilova (BUL)	A	68.90	102.5	~~107.5~~	107.5	8	132.5	~~137.5~~	~~137.5~~	7	240.0
9	Madeleine Yamechi (CMR)	A	68.45	97.5	~~102.5~~	~~102.5~~	10	127.5	132.5	~~135.0~~	6	230.0
10	Lu Wan-i (TPE)	A	68.37	95.0	100.0	~~102.5~~	9	127.5	—	—	10	227.5
11	Kim Mi-kyung (KOR)	B	65.51	~~92.5~~	92.5	~~97.5~~	15	120.0	~~125.0~~	125.0	11	217.5
12	Ewa Kuraś (POL)	B	68.49	95.0	97.5	~~100.0~~	11	120.0	~~122.5~~	~~122.5~~	12	217.5
13	Kang Mi-suk (KOR)	B	68.68	97.5	~~100.0~~	~~100.0~~	12	120.0	~~125.0~~	~~125.0~~	13	217.5
14	Eva Dimas (ESA)	B	68.32	95.0	~~97.5~~	~~97.5~~	14	112.5	115.0	~~117.5~~	14	210.0
15	Irina Vlassova (KAZ)	B	68.66	87.5	92.5	~~95.0~~	16	107.5	112.5	115.0	15	207.5
16	Tatiana Fernández (ESP)	B	67.44	90.0	95.0	~~100.0~~	13	105.0	110.0	~~112.5~~	17	205.0
17	Hanna Keränen (FIN)	B	68.87	85.0	90.0	92.5	17	105.0	~~110.0~~	110.0	18	202.5
18	Danica Rue (USA)	B	66.36	80.0	85.0	87.5	18	107.5	112.5	~~117.5~~	16	200.0
19	Jeane Lassen (CAN)	B	67.35	82.5	87.5	~~90.0~~	19	102.5	107.5	~~110.0~~	19	195.0

== New records ==
Snatch	118.5 kg	Liu Chunhong (CHN)	WR
Snatch	120.0 kg	Liu Chunhong (CHN)	WR
Clean & Jerk	150.0 kg	Liu Chunhong (CHN)	WR
Total	267.5 kg	Liu Chunhong (CHN)	WR
Total	270.0 kg	Liu Chunhong (CHN)	WR
