= 2003 World Weightlifting Championships – Women's 75 kg =

The 2003 World Weightlifting Championships were held in Vancouver, Canada from 14 November to 22 November. The women's 75 kilograms division was staged on 19 and 20 November 2003.

== Schedule ==
| Date | Time | Event |
|---|---|---|
| 19 November 2003 | 16:30 | Group C |
| 20 November 2003 | 12:30 | Group B |
| 20 November 2003 | 17:30 | Group A |

== Medalists ==
| Event | Gold | | Silver | | Bronze | |
|---|---|---|---|---|---|---|
| Snatch | Nahla Ramadan (EGY) | 117.5 kg | Şule Şahbaz (TUR) | 115.0 kg | Rumyana Petkova (BUL) | 112.5 kg |
| Clean & Jerk | Nahla Ramadan (EGY) | 145.0 kg | Slaveyka Ruzhinska (BUL) | 140.0 kg | Nadiya Shamanska (UKR) | 135.0 kg |
| Total | Nahla Ramadan (EGY) | 262.5 kg | Slaveyka Ruzhinska (BUL) | 252.5 kg | Şule Şahbaz (TUR) | 242.5 kg |

== Records ==
Prior to this competition, the existing world records were as follows.

| World Record | Snatch | Sun Ruiping (CHN) | 118.5 kg | Busan, South Korea | 7 October 2002 |
| World Record | Clean & Jerk | Sun Ruiping (CHN) | 152.5 kg | Busan, South Korea | 7 October 2002 |
| World Record | Total | Sun Ruiping (CHN) | 270.0 kg | Busan, South Korea | 7 October 2002 |

== Results ==
| Rank | Athlete | Group | Body weight | Snatch (kg) | | | | Clean & Jerk (kg) | | | | Total |
| Rank | Athlete | Group | Body weight | 1 | 2 | 3 | Rank | 1 | 2 | 3 | Rank | Total |
|---|---|---|---|---|---|---|---|---|---|---|---|---|
| 1st place, gold medalist(s) | Nahla Ramadan (EGY) | A | 74.55 | 112.5 | 117.5 | ~~120.0~~ | 1st place, gold medalist(s) | 140.0 | 145.0 | ~~150.0~~ | 1st place, gold medalist(s) | 262.5 |
| 2nd place, silver medalist(s) | Slaveyka Ruzhinska (BUL) | A | 73.38 | ~~105.0~~ | 105.0 | 112.5 | 4 | 135.0 | 140.0 | ~~145.0~~ | 2nd place, silver medalist(s) | 252.5 |
| 3rd place, bronze medalist(s) | Şule Şahbaz (TUR) | A | 74.40 | 110.0 | 115.0 | ~~117.5~~ | 2nd place, silver medalist(s) | 127.5 | ~~135.0~~ | ~~135.0~~ | 13 | 242.5 |
| 4 | Huang Shih-chun (TPE) | A | 74.58 | 107.5 | 110.0 | ~~112.5~~ | 5 | 127.5 | ~~132.5~~ | 132.5 | 6 | 242.5 |
| 5 | Rumyana Petkova (BUL) | B | 72.48 | 105.0 | 110.0 | 112.5 | 3rd place, bronze medalist(s) | 120.0 | 127.5 | ~~130.0~~ | 12 | 240.0 |
| 6 | Nadiya Shamanska (UKR) | B | 74.14 | 105.0 | ~~110.0~~ | ~~110.0~~ | 9 | 130.0 | 135.0 | ~~140.0~~ | 3rd place, bronze medalist(s) | 240.0 |
| 7 | Kim Soon-hee (KOR) | A | 74.47 | ~~105.0~~ | 105.0 | ~~110.0~~ | 11 | 135.0 | ~~140.0~~ | ~~142.5~~ | 4 | 240.0 |
| 8 | Tatyana Khromova (KAZ) | A | 74.79 | 110.0 | ~~115.0~~ | ~~115.0~~ | 6 | ~~130.0~~ | 130.0 | ~~135.0~~ | 10 | 240.0 |
| 9 | Wanda Rijo (DOM) | B | 74.56 | 102.5 | 107.5 | ~~110.0~~ | 7 | 125.0 | 130.0 | ~~132.5~~ | 8 | 237.5 |
| 10 | Karnam Malleswari (IND) | B | 69.23 | ~~105.0~~ | 105.0 | ~~107.5~~ | 8 | 125.0 | 130.0 | ~~135.0~~ | 7 | 235.0 |
| 11 | Nora Köppel (ARG) | A | 73.30 | ~~102.5~~ | ~~102.5~~ | 102.5 | 12 | ~~132.5~~ | ~~132.5~~ | 132.5 | 5 | 235.0 |
| 12 | Svetlana Podobedova (RUS) | B | 74.39 | 95.0 | 100.0 | 105.0 | 10 | 125.0 | ~~130.0~~ | ~~132.5~~ | 14 | 230.0 |
| 13 | Kateryna Byelik (UKR) | B | 74.67 | 100.0 | ~~105.0~~ | ~~105.0~~ | 15 | 120.0 | 125.0 | 130.0 | 9 | 230.0 |
| 14 | Lee Yeon-hwa (KOR) | B | 74.93 | ~~95.0~~ | 95.0 | ~~100.0~~ | 22 | 125.0 | 130.0 | ~~132.5~~ | 11 | 225.0 |
| 15 | Ijeoma Nwatu (NGR) | C | 73.04 | 95.0 | ~~100.0~~ | ~~100.0~~ | 18 | 115.0 | 120.0 | 122.5 | 15 | 217.5 |
| 16 | Cara Heads (USA) | C | 74.03 | ~~97.5~~ | 97.5 | ~~100.0~~ | 16 | 115.0 | 120.0 | ~~122.5~~ | 18 | 217.5 |
| 17 | Veronika Lukashevich (BLR) | C | 72.87 | 95.0 | ~~100.0~~ | ~~100.0~~ | 17 | 115.0 | ~~120.0~~ | 120.0 | 16 | 215.0 |
| 18 | Damaris Aguirre (MEX) | C | 73.95 | 95.0 | 100.0 | ~~102.5~~ | 14 | 115.0 | ~~117.5~~ | ~~120.0~~ | 21 | 215.0 |
| 19 | Liu Fang-hsiu (TPE) | C | 73.96 | ~~95.0~~ | 95.0 | ~~97.5~~ | 19 | ~~120.0~~ | 120.0 | ~~125.0~~ | 17 | 215.0 |
| 20 | Gina Hoog (GER) | C | 74.77 | 90.0 | 92.5 | ~~95.0~~ | 25 | 115.0 | 120.0 | ~~122.5~~ | 19 | 212.5 |
| 21 | Aysel Özgür (TUR) | C | 74.98 | 95.0 | 100.0 | 102.5 | 13 | 110.0 | ~~115.0~~ | ~~115.0~~ | 24 | 212.5 |
| 22 | Radomíra Ševčíková (CZE) | C | 74.26 | 92.5 | ~~97.5~~ | ~~97.5~~ | 23 | 112.5 | 117.5 | ~~120.0~~ | 20 | 210.0 |
| 23 | Cinthya Domínguez (MEX) | C | 74.80 | ~~95.0~~ | ~~95.0~~ | 95.0 | 21 | ~~107.5~~ | 107.5 | 112.5 | 22 | 207.5 |
| 24 | Sefi Onubaye (NGR) | C | 74.00 | ~~95.0~~ | ~~95.0~~ | 95.0 | 20 | 110.0 | ~~115.0~~ | ~~115.0~~ | 23 | 205.0 |
| 25 | Charlotte MacEachern (CAN) | C | 74.68 | 87.5 | ~~92.5~~ | 92.5 | 24 | 97.5 | ~~102.5~~ | 102.5 | 25 | 195.0 |
| DQ | Shang Shichun (CHN) | A | 74.00 | 115.0 | 117.5 | 120.0 | — | 145.0 | 147.5 | 153.0 | — | — |
| DQ | Ilona Dankó (HUN) | A | 74.24 | 107.5 | ~~112.5~~ | ~~112.5~~ | — | 130.0 | 135.0 | ~~137.5~~ | — | — |

== New records ==
| Snatch | ~~120.0 kg~~ | ~~Shang Shichun (CHN)~~ | ~~WR~~ |
| Clean & Jerk | ~~153.0 kg~~ | ~~Shang Shichun (CHN)~~ | ~~WR~~ |
| Total | ~~272.5 kg~~ | ~~Shang Shichun (CHN)~~ | ~~WR~~ |
