= Eszter Krutzler =

Hungarian weightlifter (born 1981)

Personal information
- Born: March 4, 1981 (age 45) Szombathely, Hungary
Medal record
Women's Weightlifting
Representing Hungary
Olympic Games
Silver medal – second place	2004 Athens	– 69 kg
World Weightlifting Championships
Silver medal – second place	2003 Vancouver	– 69 kg
Bronze medal – third place	2001 Antalya	– 69 kg
European Weightlifting Championships
Bronze medal – third place	2011 Kazan	– 69 kg

Eszter Krutzler (born March 4, 1981, in Szombathely, Vas) is a female weightlifter from Hungary. She became an Olympic medalist during the 2004 Summer Olympics when she won the silver medal in the women's – 69 kg class.

== Major results ==
Year	Venue	Weight	Snatch (kg)				Clean & Jerk (kg)				Total	Rank
Year	Venue	Weight	1	2	3	Rank	1	2	3	Rank	Total	Rank
Representing Hungary
Olympic Games
2004	Athens, Greece	69 kg	117.5	~~122.5~~	~~122.5~~	2	142.5	145.0	~~153.5~~	2	262.5	2nd place, silver medalist(s)
World Championships
2011	Paris, France	69 kg	99	~~102~~	102	10	120	124	~~129~~	16	226	17
2010	Antalya, Turkey	69 kg	97	101	~~104~~	8	~~120~~	120	~~125~~	13	221	12
2003	Vancouver, Canada	69 kg	107.5	112.5	117.5	3rd place, bronze medalist(s)	135.0	140.0	145.0	2nd place, silver medalist(s)	262.5	2nd place, silver medalist(s)
2002	Warsaw, Poland	69 kg	105.0	~~110.0~~	~~110.0~~	5	130.0	135.0	~~140.0~~	4	240.0	4
2001	Antalya, Turkey	69 kg	105.0	107.5	110.0	2nd place, silver medalist(s)	130.0	~~135.0~~	~~135.0~~	3rd place, bronze medalist(s)	240.0	3rd place, bronze medalist(s)
1999	Athens, Greece	63 kg	87.5	90.0	92.5	7	107.5	~~112.5~~	~~112.5~~	14	200.0	9
1998	Lahti, Finland	63 kg	82.5	~~87.5~~	~~87.5~~	10	100.0	~~105.0~~	~~105.0~~	15	182.5	13
European Championships
2012	Antalya, Turkey	69 kg	~~101~~	~~101~~	~~101~~	—	—	—	—	—	—	—
2011	Kazan, Russia	69 kg	95	100	104	3rd place, bronze medalist(s)	117	123	127	3rd place, bronze medalist(s)	231	3rd place, bronze medalist(s)
2010	Minsk, Belarus	75 kg	90	95	~~97~~	8	110	115	~~118~~	6	210	7
2008	Lignano Sabbiadoro, Italy	63 kg	~~85~~	85	~~90~~	12	~~103~~	105	~~110~~	13	190	12
