= Kang Mi-suk =

Kang Mi-suk may refer to:

- Kang Mi-suk (weightlifter) (born 1977), South Korean weightlifter
- Kang Mi-suk (curler) (born 1968), South Korean wheelchair curler
