= Vanda Maslovska =

Ukrainian weightlifter

Personal information
- Full name: Vanda Oleksandrivna Maslovska
- Born: 21 April 1980 (age 46)
- Height: 158 cm (5 ft 2 in)
- Weight: 67.85 kg (149.6 lb)

Sport
- Country: Ukraine
- Sport: Weightlifting
- Weight class: 69 kg
- Team: National team
- Updated on 13 September 2016

Vanda Oleksandrivna Maslovska (Ванда Олександрівна Масловська, born 21 April 1980) is a retired Ukrainian female weightlifter, competing in the 69 kg category and representing Ukraine at international competitions.

She participated at the 2004 Summer Olympics in the 69 kg event. She competed at world championships, most recently at the 2003 World Weightlifting Championships.

== Major results ==
Year	Venue	Weight	Snatch (kg)				Clean & Jerk (kg)				Total	Rank
Year	Venue	Weight	1	2	3	Rank	1	2	3	Rank	Total	Rank
Summer Olympics
2004	Athens, Greece	69 kg	105	~~110~~	110	—N/a	130	135	~~140~~	—N/a	245	5
World Championships
2003	Vancouver, Canada	69 kg	105	110	~~115~~	7	130	~~135~~	~~135~~	8	240	7
2002	Warsaw, Poland	69 kg	100	105	107.5	4	125	130	~~135~~	6	237.5	5
2001	Antalya, Turkey	69 kg	95	100	~~105~~	5	120	125	~~130~~	7	225	6
1999	Piraeus, Greece	69 kg	92.5	~~95~~	95	14	112.5	~~117.5~~	~~117.5~~	16	207.5	14
