= 1998 World Weightlifting Championships – Women's 63 kg =

The 1998 World Weightlifting Championships were held in Lahti, Finland from November 7 to November 15. The women's competition in the middleweight (63 kg) division was staged on 12 November 1998.

== Medalists ==
| Event | Gold | | Silver | | Bronze | |
|---|---|---|---|---|---|---|
| Snatch | Chen Jui-lien (TPE) | 102.5 kg | Valentina Popova (RUS) | 100.0 kg | Shi Lihua (CHN) | 97.5 kg |
| Clean & Jerk | Shi Lihua (CHN) | 127.5 kg | Chen Jui-lien (TPE) | 122.5 kg | Aneta Szczepańska (POL) | 115.0 kg |
| Total | Chen Jui-lien (TPE) | 225.0 kg | Shi Lihua (CHN) | 225.0 kg | Valentina Popova (RUS) | 215.0 kg |

== Records ==
Prior to this competition, the existing world records were as follows.

| World Record | Snatch | Xiong Meiying (CHN) | 103.0 kg | Chongqing, China | 18 September 1998 |
| World Record | Clean & Jerk | Hou Kangfeng (CHN) | 128.5 kg | Sofia, Bulgaria | 21 May 1998 |
| World Record | Total | Diao Weiwei (CHN) | 230.0 kg | Ramat Gan, Israel | 24 April 1998 |

== Results ==
| Rank | Athlete | Body weight | Snatch (kg) | | | | Clean & Jerk (kg) | | | | Total |
| Rank | Athlete | Body weight | 1 | 2 | 3 | Rank | 1 | 2 | 3 | Rank | Total |
|---|---|---|---|---|---|---|---|---|---|---|---|
| 1st place, gold medalist(s) | Chen Jui-lien (TPE) | 61.79 | 97.5 | 102.5 | ~~105.0~~ | 1st place, gold medalist(s) | 117.5 | 122.5 | ~~125.0~~ | 2nd place, silver medalist(s) | 225.0 |
| 2nd place, silver medalist(s) | Shi Lihua (CHN) | 62.31 | ~~97.5~~ | 97.5 | ~~102.5~~ | 3rd place, bronze medalist(s) | 122.5 | 127.5 | ~~130.0~~ | 1st place, gold medalist(s) | 225.0 |
| 3rd place, bronze medalist(s) | Valentina Popova (RUS) | 62.50 | 95.0 | 100.0 | ~~102.5~~ | 2nd place, silver medalist(s) | 115.0 | ~~122.5~~ | ~~122.5~~ | 4 | 215.0 |
| 4 | Aneta Szczepańska (POL) | 62.03 | 85.0 | 87.5 | ~~90.0~~ | 6 | ~~110.0~~ | 110.0 | 115.0 | 3rd place, bronze medalist(s) | 202.5 |
| 5 | Alejandra Perea (COL) | 61.97 | 80.0 | 85.0 | 87.5 | 5 | 100.0 | 105.0 | ~~107.5~~ | 8 | 192.5 |
| 6 | Josefa Pérez (ESP) | 62.49 | 85.0 | 87.5 | ~~90.0~~ | 7 | 102.5 | ~~105.0~~ | 105.0 | 9 | 192.5 |
| 7 | Nancy Niro (CAN) | 61.19 | ~~82.5~~ | ~~82.5~~ | 82.5 | 8 | 102.5 | ~~107.5~~ | 107.5 | 6 | 190.0 |
| 8 | Katia Iacuzzo (ITA) | 62.38 | 82.5 | ~~85.0~~ | ~~85.0~~ | 9 | 102.5 | 105.0 | 107.5 | 7 | 190.0 |
| 9 | Tímea Raj (HUN) | 62.42 | ~~90.0~~ | 90.0 | ~~92.5~~ | 4 | 100.0 | ~~105.0~~ | ~~105.0~~ | 14 | 190.0 |
| 10 | Choi Eun-ja (KOR) | 62.46 | 80.0 | ~~85.0~~ | ~~85.0~~ | 14 | 105.0 | 110.0 | ~~115.0~~ | 5 | 190.0 |
| 11 | Michelle Kettner (AUS) | 62.70 | 82.5 | ~~87.5~~ | ~~87.5~~ | 11 | 102.5 | ~~107.5~~ | ~~107.5~~ | 11 | 185.0 |
| 12 | Laure Mary (FRA) | 62.34 | ~~80.0~~ | ~~80.0~~ | 80.0 | 13 | 100.0 | 102.5 | ~~105.0~~ | 10 | 182.5 |
| 13 | Eszter Krutzler (HUN) | 62.58 | 82.5 | ~~87.5~~ | ~~87.5~~ | 10 | 100.0 | ~~105.0~~ | ~~105.0~~ | 15 | 182.5 |
| 14 | Ana María Arraez (VEN) | 60.96 | 80.0 | ~~85.0~~ | ~~85.0~~ | 12 | 100.0 | ~~102.5~~ | ~~102.5~~ | 12 | 180.0 |
| 15 | Claudia Müller (GER) | 61.83 | 77.5 | ~~82.5~~ | ~~82.5~~ | 15 | ~~100.0~~ | ~~100.0~~ | 100.0 | 13 | 177.5 |
| 16 | Madiha Abdelmoneim (EGY) | 62.26 | 65.0 | 70.0 | ~~72.5~~ | 16 | 87.5 | 90.0 | 92.5 | 16 | 162.5 |
| 17 | Riitta Pirkkiö (FIN) | 62.98 | 65.0 | 70.0 | ~~72.5~~ | 18 | 82.5 | 87.5 | 90.0 | 18 | 160.0 |
| 18 | Michal Cooper (ISR) | 61.55 | 60.0 | 67.5 | ~~72.5~~ | 19 | 82.5 | 90.0 | ~~95.0~~ | 17 | 157.5 |
| 19 | María Andrea Gatti (ARG) | 62.38 | 67.5 | ~~70.0~~ | 70.0 | 17 | 80.0 | 85.0 | ~~87.5~~ | 19 | 155.0 |
| 20 | Harriet Namusoke (UGA) | 62.03 | 50.0 | 55.0 | ~~60.0~~ | 20 | ~~60.0~~ | 70.0 | 75.0 | 20 | 130.0 |
