= 2003 World Weightlifting Championships – Women's 63 kg =

The 2003 World Weightlifting Championships were held in Vancouver, Canada from 14 November to 22 November. The women's 63 kilograms division was staged on 17 and 18 November 2003.

== Schedule ==
Date	Time	Event
17 November 2003	16:00	Group C
18 November 2003	12:30	Group B
18 November 2003	17:30	Group A

== Medalists ==
Event	Gold		Silver		Bronze	
Snatch	Hanna Batsiushka (BLR)	113.5 kg	Nataliya Skakun (UKR)	110.0 kg	Liu Xia (CHN)	107.5 kg
Clean & Jerk	Nataliya Skakun (UKR)	138.0 kg	Liu Xia (CHN)	137.5 kg	Xiong Meiying (CHN)	135.0 kg
Total	Nataliya Skakun (UKR)	247.5 kg	Liu Xia (CHN)	245.0 kg	Hanna Batsiushka (BLR)	240.0 kg

== Records ==
Prior to this competition, the existing world records were as follows.

World Record	Snatch	Ouyang Xiaofang (CHN)	113.0 kg	Bali, Indonesia	10 August 2003
World Record	Clean & Jerk	Liu Xia (CHN)	137.5 kg	Qinhuangdao, China	12 September 2003
World Record	Total	Liu Xia (CHN)	247.5 kg	Qinhuangdao, China	12 September 2003

== Results ==
Rank	Athlete	Group	Body weight	Snatch (kg)				Clean & Jerk (kg)				Total
Rank	Athlete	Group	Body weight	1	2	3	Rank	1	2	3	Rank	Total
1st place, gold medalist(s)	Nataliya Skakun (UKR)	A	62.16	102.5	107.5	110.0	2nd place, silver medalist(s)	130.0	135.0	138.0	1st place, gold medalist(s)	247.5
2nd place, silver medalist(s)	Liu Xia (CHN)	A	62.47	102.5	~~107.5~~	107.5	3rd place, bronze medalist(s)	132.5	137.5	~~142.5~~	2nd place, silver medalist(s)	245.0
3rd place, bronze medalist(s)	Hanna Batsiushka (BLR)	A	62.77	105.0	110.0	113.5	1st place, gold medalist(s)	122.5	127.5	~~132.5~~	6	240.0
4	Xiong Meiying (CHN)	A	61.71	~~100.0~~	~~100.0~~	100.0	6	130.0	135.0	~~137.5~~	3rd place, bronze medalist(s)	235.0
5	Gergana Kirilova (BUL)	A	62.08	105.0	~~110.0~~	~~110.0~~	4	~~125.0~~	125.0	130.0	4	235.0
6	Zlatina Atanasova (BUL)	A	62.50	95.0	100.0	102.5	5	122.5	127.5	~~132.5~~	5	230.0
7	Kesorn Chooban (THA)	A	61.90	95.0	~~100.0~~	~~100.0~~	7	115.0	120.0	~~122.5~~	8	215.0
8	Leila Lassouani (ALG)	A	62.92	~~90.0~~	~~90.0~~	90.0	20	122.5	~~125.0~~	125.0	7	215.0
9	Oksana Solonenko (RUS)	A	62.48	95.0	~~100.0~~	~~100.0~~	8	112.5	117.5	~~120.0~~	10	212.5
10	Hebatalla Ibrahim (EGY)	A	62.49	90.0	92.5	95.0	9	115.0	117.5	~~120.0~~	11	212.5
11	Ubaldina Valoyes (COL)	B	62.84	90.0	95.0	~~97.5~~	11	110.0	115.0	117.5	12	212.5
12	Pratima Kumari (IND)	B	62.56	90.0	~~95.0~~	95.0	10	~~115.0~~	115.0	~~117.5~~	14	210.0
13	Tatsiana Stukalava (BLR)	B	62.93	90.0	95.0	~~97.5~~	12	110.0	115.0	~~120.0~~	15	210.0
14	Kim Soo-kyung (KOR)	B	62.24	87.5	~~92.5~~	~~92.5~~	22	115.0	~~120.0~~	120.0	9	207.5
15	Anike Ayodeji (NGR)	B	62.01	~~85.0~~	85.0	90.0	18	115.0	~~120.0~~	~~120.0~~	13	205.0
16	Luz Acosta (MEX)	C	62.12	90.0	92.5	~~95.0~~	14	~~110.0~~	110.0	112.5	18	205.0
17	Wu Chi-tsen (TPE)	B	62.44	87.5	92.5	~~95.0~~	15	112.5	~~117.5~~	~~117.5~~	20	205.0
18	Sunaina Anand (IND)	B	58.33	85.0	87.5	90.0	16	107.5	~~112.5~~	112.5	16	202.5
19	Seda İnce (TUR)	B	61.15	87.5	90.0	92.5	13	107.5	~~110.0~~	110.0	22	202.5
20	Hripsime Khurshudyan (ARM)	B	62.13	85.0	90.0	~~92.5~~	19	107.5	110.0	112.5	19	202.5
21	Carissa Gordon (USA)	B	61.24	85.0	87.5	~~90.0~~	21	105.0	110.0	~~115.0~~	23	197.5
22	Szilvia Nagy (HUN)	C	61.64	80.0	85.0	~~90.0~~	25	105.0	110.0	112.5	17	197.5
23	Mercedes Fernández (ARG)	B	60.27	~~90.0~~	90.0	~~92.5~~	17	105.0	~~107.5~~	~~110.0~~	25	195.0
24	Katia Iacuzzo (ITA)	B	62.47	85.0	~~87.5~~	87.5	23	105.0	~~110.0~~	~~110.0~~	29	192.5
25	Nikoletta Nagy (HUN)	C	62.78	~~80.0~~	80.0	~~85.0~~	32	105.0	110.0	112.5	21	192.5
26	Yoshiko Kitamura (JPN)	C	61.08	82.5	85.0	~~87.5~~	24	100.0	105.0	~~107.5~~	26	190.0
27	Aneta Szczepańska (POL)	C	62.17	80.0	82.5	~~85.0~~	28	105.0	~~110.0~~	~~110.0~~	27	187.5
28	Yedid Orozco (MEX)	C	62.68	85.0	~~90.0~~	~~90.0~~	26	~~102.5~~	102.5	~~110.0~~	31	187.5
29	Marlène Gudin (FRA)	C	62.16	80.0	82.5	~~85.0~~	27	100.0	102.5	~~105.0~~	30	185.0
30	Christine Girard (CAN)	C	62.31	77.5	~~82.5~~	~~82.5~~	34	102.5	~~107.5~~	107.5	24	185.0
31	Svetlana Dandukova (KAZ)	C	62.33	80.0	~~85.0~~	~~85.0~~	29	100.0	~~105.0~~	105.0	28	185.0
32	Justyna Smosarska (POL)	C	62.34	80.0	~~85.0~~	~~85.0~~	30	100.0	~~105.0~~	~~105.0~~	32	180.0
33	Annette Campbell (GBR)	C	62.77	77.5	~~80.0~~	80.0	31	95.0	~~100.0~~	~~100.0~~	33	175.0
34	Jacquie White (AUS)	C	62.88	75.0	80.0	~~82.5~~	33	~~95.0~~	95.0	~~100.0~~	34	175.0
35	Yang Yifan (SIN)	C	60.92	65.0	~~70.0~~	~~70.0~~	35	~~85.0~~	85.0	~~87.5~~	35	150.0
—	Veronika Buroňová (CZE)	C	62.59	~~82.5~~	~~82.5~~	~~82.5~~	—	—	—	—	—	—
—	Ruth Rivera (PUR)	C	62.75	~~87.5~~	~~87.5~~	~~87.5~~	—	—	—	—	—	—
—	Pascale Dorcelus (CAN)	C	62.90	~~82.5~~	—	—	—	—	—	—	—	—

== New records ==
Snatch	113.5 kg	Hanna Batsiushka (BLR)	WR
Clean & Jerk	138.0 kg	Nataliya Skakun (UKR)	WR
