= 2007 World Weightlifting Championships – Women's 69 kg =

The women's competition in 69 kg division was staged on September 24, 2007.

== Schedule ==
Date	Time	Event
24 September 2007	09:00	Group C
24 September 2007	11:30	Group B
24 September 2007	14:00	Group A

== Medalists ==
Event	Gold		Silver		Bronze	
Snatch	Liu Chunhong (CHN)	121 kg	Oxana Slivenko (RUS)	120 kg	Nataliya Davydova (UKR)	114 kg
Clean & Jerk	Oxana Slivenko (RUS)	156 kg	Liu Chunhong (CHN)	150 kg	Hong Yong-ok (PRK)	133 kg
Total	Oxana Slivenko (RUS)	276 kg	Liu Chunhong (CHN)	271 kg	Nataliya Davydova (UKR)	244 kg

== Records ==
Prior to this competition, the existing world records were as follows.

World Record	Snatch	Oxana Slivenko (RUS)	123 kg	Santo Domingo, Dominican	4 October 2006
World Record	Clean & Jerk	Zarema Kasaeva (RUS)	157 kg	Doha, Qatar	13 November 2005
World Record	Total	Liu Chunhong (CHN)	275 kg	Athens, Greece	19 August 2004

== Results ==
Rank	Athlete	Group	Body weight	Snatch (kg)				Clean & Jerk (kg)				Total
Rank	Athlete	Group	Body weight	1	2	3	Rank	1	2	3	Rank	Total
1st place, gold medalist(s)	Oxana Slivenko (RUS)	A	68.38	115	120	~~124~~	2nd place, silver medalist(s)	146	151	156	1st place, gold medalist(s)	276
2nd place, silver medalist(s)	Liu Chunhong (CHN)	A	68.75	112	117	121	1st place, gold medalist(s)	145	150	~~155~~	2nd place, silver medalist(s)	271
3rd place, bronze medalist(s)	Nataliya Davydova (UKR)	A	68.28	107	112	114	3rd place, bronze medalist(s)	130	~~136~~	~~136~~	5	244
4	Hong Yong-ok (PRK)	A	67.93	102	105	~~107~~	7	133	~~137~~	~~137~~	3rd place, bronze medalist(s)	238
5	Nazik Avdalyan (ARM)	A	68.41	~~102~~	102	~~106~~	11	129	133	~~137~~	4	235
6	Jeane Lassen (CAN)	A	68.74	98	102	105	8	124	128	~~132~~	6	233
7	Leydi Solís (COL)	A	66.34	100	103	105	6	122	125	~~127~~	9	230
8	Tulia Medina (COL)	A	67.62	~~103~~	103	107	5	~~123~~	123	~~126~~	10	230
9	Irina Nekrassova (KAZ)	B	64.07	95	100	103	9	115	120	125	8	228
10	Hwang Pu-lum (KOR)	B	68.65	93	98	~~101~~	15	120	~~125~~	127	7	225
11	Monika Devi (IND)	B	68.56	95	99	~~102~~	14	120	~~125~~	~~125~~	13	219
12	Hanna Batsiushka (BLR)	B	67.17	95	100	103	10	~~115~~	115	~~120~~	16	218
13	Yuliya Artemova (UKR)	B	67.07	93	97	99	13	114	117	~~120~~	15	216
14	Khuất Minh Hải (VIE)	B	64.81	85	90	95	17	113	118	~~122~~	14	213
15	Eleni Kourtelidou (GRE)	C	68.77	85	89	92	19	111	117	121	11	213
16	Kao Ya-chun (TPE)	C	65.67	83	88	91	20	110	116	120	12	211
17	Slaveyka Ruzhinska (BUL)	B	68.71	90	95	96	16	112	~~117~~	~~117~~	18	208
18	Aksana Zalatarova (BLR)	B	67.88	90	95	~~97~~	18	105	111	~~114~~	19	206
19	Rika Saito (JPN)	B	68.56	~~85~~	85	87	23	112	114	~~117~~	17	201
20	Halimah Tusaidah (INA)	B	66.10	85	90	~~92~~	21	110	~~115~~	~~115~~	20	200
21	Hebatalla Ibrahim (EGY)	B	67.21	88	~~91~~	~~91~~	22	110	~~115~~	~~115~~	21	198
22	Todorka Ivanova (BUL)	C	68.68	~~87~~	~~87~~	87	25	106	108	109	22	196
23	Marie-Ève Beauchemin-Nadeau (CAN)	C	68.58	~~87~~	~~87~~	87	24	~~105~~	~~105~~	105	24	192
24	Bunmi Adekola (NGR)	C	64.18	81	~~84~~	84	26	~~106~~	106	~~110~~	23	190
25	Raquel Alonso (ESP)	C	68.34	~~82~~	82	~~87~~	28	103	~~106~~	~~106~~	25	185
26	Sibel Altındaş (TUR)	C	66.75	75	80	82	27	93	~~98~~	~~98~~	26	175
27	Antonia Leyba (DOM)	C	67.04	~~75~~	~~75~~	75	29	~~92~~	92	~~97~~	27	167
—	Svetlana Shimkova (RUS)	A	68.07	110	112	~~113~~	4	~~135~~	~~135~~	~~136~~	—	—
—	Madeleine Yamechi (FRA)	A	68.63	97	99	101	12	~~124~~	~~124~~	~~125~~	—	—
DQ	Yar Thet Pan (MYA)	B	68.27	100	107	~~112~~	—	130	135	140	—	—

== New records ==
Total	276 kg	Oxana Slivenko (RUS)	WR
