= Weightlifting at the 2004 Summer Olympics – Women's 69 kg =

Weightlifting at the Olympics

Women's 69 kg at the Games of the XXVIII Olympiad
- Venue: Nikaia Olympic Weightlifting Hall
- Date: 19 August 2004
- Competitors: 11 from 10 nations

Medalists
1st place, gold medalist(s)		Liu Chunhong	China
2nd place, silver medalist(s)		Eszter Krutzler	Hungary
3rd place, bronze medalist(s)		Zarema Kasaeva	Russia

The women's 69 kg weightlifting event at the 2004 Summer Olympics in Athens, Greece took place at the Nikaia Olympic Weightlifting Hall on 19 August.

Total score was the sum of the lifter's best result in each of the snatch and the clean and jerk, with three lifts allowed for each lift. In case of a tie, the lighter lifter won; if still tied, the lifter who took the fewest attempts to achieve the total score won. Lifters without a valid snatch score did not perform the clean and jerk.

== Schedule ==
All times are Eastern European Summer Time (UTC+03:00)

Date	Time	Event
19 August 2004	16:30	Group A

== Records ==
{{{caption}}}
World Record	Snatch	Liu Chunhong (CHN)	120.0 kg	Vancouver, Canada	19 November 2003
World Record	Clean & Jerk	Liu Chunhong (CHN)	152.5 kg	Almaty, Kazakhstan	9 April 2004
World Record	Total	Liu Chunhong (CHN)	270.0 kg	Vancouver, Canada	19 November 2003
Olympic Record	Snatch	Erzsébet Márkus (HUN)	112.5 kg	Sydney, Australia	19 September 2000
Olympic Record	Clean & Jerk	Olympic Standard	142.5 kg	—	1 January 1997
Olympic Record	Total	Olympic Standard	252.5 kg	—	1 January 1997

== Results ==
Rank	Athlete	Group	Body weight	Snatch (kg)				Clean & Jerk (kg)				Total
Rank	Athlete	Group	Body weight	1	2	3	Result	1	2	3	Result	Total
1st place, gold medalist(s)	Liu Chunhong (CHN)	A	68.14	115.0	120.0	122.5	122.5	147.5	153.0	—	152.5	275.0
2nd place, silver medalist(s)	Eszter Krutzler (HUN)	A	68.41	117.5	~~122.5~~	~~122.5~~	117.5	142.5	145.0	~~153.5~~	145.0	262.5
3rd place, bronze medalist(s)	Zarema Kasaeva (RUS)	A	68.67	115.0	117.5	~~120.0~~	117.5	140.0	145.0	~~147.5~~	145.0	262.5
4	Slaveyka Ruzhinska (BUL)	A	68.23	110.0	~~115.0~~	115.0	115.0	135.0	~~142.5~~	~~145.0~~	135.0	250.0
5	Vanda Maslovska (UKR)	A	67.72	105.0	~~110.0~~	110.0	110.0	130.0	135.0	~~140.0~~	135.0	245.0
6	Milena Trendafilova (BUL)	A	68.21	105.0	~~107.5~~	~~107.5~~	105.0	~~130.0~~	130.0	132.5	132.5	237.5
7	Madeleine Yamechi (CMR)	A	68.40	100.0	~~105.0~~	105.0	105.0	130.0	~~135.0~~	~~135.0~~	130.0	235.0
8	Ubaldina Valoyes (COL)	A	68.31	~~102.5~~	102.5	105.0	105.0	~~127.5~~	127.5	~~132.5~~	127.5	232.5
9	Irene Ajambo (UGA)	A	68.77	60.0	~~65.0~~	~~65.0~~	60.0	80.0	85.0	90.0	90.0	150.0
—	Sibel Şimşek (TUR)	A	68.97	~~115.0~~	~~115.0~~	~~115.0~~	—	—	—	—	—	—
—	Kang Mi-suk (KOR)	A	68.68	100.0	~~105.0~~	~~105.0~~	100.0	~~125.0~~	~~125.0~~	~~125.0~~	—	—

== New records ==
Snatch	115.0 kg	Liu Chunhong (CHN)	OR
Snatch	117.5 kg	Eszter Krutzler (HUN)	OR
Snatch	120.0 kg	Liu Chunhong (CHN)	OR
Snatch	122.5 kg	Liu Chunhong (CHN)	WR
Clean & Jerk	145.0 kg	Zarema Kasaeva (RUS)	OR
Clean & Jerk	147.5 kg	Liu Chunhong (CHN)	OR
Clean & Jerk	153.0 kg	Liu Chunhong (CHN)	WR
Total	257.5 kg	Zarema Kasaeva (RUS)	OR
Total	260.0 kg	Eszter Krutzler (HUN)	OR
Total	262.5 kg	Zarema Kasaeva (RUS)	OR
Total	270.0 kg	Liu Chunhong (CHN)	OR
Total	275.0 kg	Liu Chunhong (CHN)	WR
