= Khabirov =

Khabirov (Bashkir or Tatar: Хәбиров; Russian: Хабиров) is a Tatar and Bashkir masculine surname; its feminine counterpart is Khabirova. The surname may refer to

- Radiy Khabirov (born 1964), Russian politician
- Svetlana Khabirova (born 1978), Russian weightlifter
