= Annette Campbell =

British weightlifter

Personal information
- Full name: Annette Doreen Campbell
- Nationality: United Kingdom
- Born: 24 October 1961 (age 64) Camberwell, London, England
- Weight: 62.77 kg (138.4 lb)

Sport
- Country: England; Great Britain
- Sport: Weightlifting
- Weight class: 63 kg
- Team: National team
- Updated on 13 September 2016

Annette Doreen Campbell (born 24 October 1961) is a British weightlifter, competing in the 63 kg category and representing England and Great Britain at international competitions. She competed at world championships, most recently at the 2003 World Weightlifting Championships.

== Major results ==
Year	Venue	Weight	Snatch (kg)					Clean & Jerk (kg)					Total	Rank
Year	Venue	Weight	1	2	3	Result	Rank	1	2	3	Result	Rank	Total	Rank
Representing Great Britain
World Championships
2003	Vancouver, Canada	63 kg	77.5	~~80.0~~	80.0	80.0	31	95.0	~~100.0~~	~~100.0~~	95.0	33	175.0	33
2001	Antalya, Turkey	63 kg	77.5	82.5	~~85.0~~	82.5	13	92.5	95.0	~~97.5~~	95.0	16	177.5	16
1992	Varna, Bulgaria	60 kg	—N/a	—N/a	—N/a	70.0	16	—N/a	—N/a	—N/a	90.0	15	160.0	14
1991	Donaueschingen, Germany	60 kg	70.0	~~75.0~~	~~75.0~~	70.0	6	85.0	~~90.0~~	~~90.0~~	85.0	7	155.0	6
1989	(United Kingdom) Manchester, Great Britain	60 kg	60.0	~~65.0~~	65.0	65.0	14	80.0	85.0	87.5	87.5	11	152.5	10
European Championships
2005	Sofia, Bulgaria	63 kg	77.5	80.0	~~82.5~~	80.0	13	95.0	100.0	~~102.5~~	100.0	13	180.0	13
2004	Kyiv, Ukraine	63 kg	80.0	~~82.5~~	~~82.5~~	80.0	12	~~97.5~~	97.5	~~100.0~~	97.5	12	177.5	12
2002	Antalya, Turkey	63 kg	80.0	~~82.5~~	~~82.5~~	80.0	8	95.0	~~97.5~~	~~97.5~~	95.0	9	175.0	9
Representing England
Commonwealth Games *
2006	Melbourne, Australia	63 kg	72	~~75~~	75	75	6	87	90	~~92~~	90	7	165	6
2002	Manchester, England	63 kg	~~80.0~~	~~80.0~~	80.0	80.0	4	95.0	97.5	~~100.0~~	97.5	4	177.5	4

* By 2002, medals were awarded in all three categories.
