= Josefa Pérez =

Spanish weightlifter

Personal information
- Full name: Josefa Pérez Carmona
- Born: 5 January 1977 (age 49) Almería, Spain
- Height: 163 cm (5 ft 4 in)
- Weight: 69.75 kg (153.8 lb)

Sport
- Country: Spain
- Sport: Weightlifting
- Weight class: 75 kg
- Club: Halterofilia Almería
- Team: National team
- Updated on 27 September 2016

Josefa Pérez Carmona (born 5 January 1977 in Almería) is a Spanish female weightlifter, competing in the 75 kg category and representing Spain at international competitions.

She participated at the 2000 Summer Olympics in the 63 kg event. She competed at world championships, most recently at the 2002 World Weightlifting Championships.

== Major results ==
Year	Venue	Weight	Snatch (kg)				Clean & Jerk (kg)				Total	Rank
Year	Venue	Weight	1	2	3	Rank	1	2	3	Rank	Total	Rank
Summer Olympics
2000	Sydney, Australia	63 kg				—N/a				—N/a		7
World Championships
2002	Warsaw, Poland	75 kg	~~85~~	~~85~~	85	10	102.5	105	~~107.5~~	12	190	11
2001	Antalya, Turkey	63 kg	~~82.5~~	82.5	~~85~~	15	100	102.5	~~105~~	14	185	14
1999	Piraeus, Greece	63 kg	85	87.5	90	10	102.5	107.5	~~110~~	16	197.5	10
1998	Lahti, Finland	63 kg	85	87.5	~~90~~	7	102.5	~~105~~	105	9	192.5	6
