= Kesaia Tawai =

Fijian weightlifter

Personal information
- Full name: Kesaia Tawai
- Born: 8 May 1980 (age 46) Levuka, Fiji
- Height: 166 cm (5 ft 5 in)
- Weight: 63.00 kg (138.89 lb)

Sport
- Country: Fiji
- Sport: Weightlifting
- Weight class: 63 kg
- Team: National team
- Updated on 28 September 2016

Kesaia Tawai (born 8 May 1980 in Levuka) was a Fijian female weightlifter, competing in the 63 kg category and representing Fiji at international competitions.

She participated at the 2000 Summer Olympics in the 63 kg event. She competed at world championships, most recently at the 1999 World Weightlifting Championships.

== Major results ==
Year	Venue	Weight	Snatch (kg)				Clean & Jerk (kg)				Total	Rank
Year	Venue	Weight	1	2	3	Rank	1	2	3	Rank	Total	Rank
Summer Olympics
2000	Sydney, Australia	63 kg				—N/a				—N/a		9
World Championships
1999	Piraeus, Greece	63 kg	~~72.5~~	72.5	~~77.5~~	30	85	~~90~~	~~90~~	30	157.5	28
