= Chen Jui-lien =

Taiwanese weightlifter (born 1971)

Personal information
- Full name: Chen Jui-lien
- Nationality: Taiwanese
- Born: 2 June 1971 (age 55)
- Weight: 62.17 kg (137 lb)

Sport
- Country: Chinese Taipei
- Sport: Weightlifting
- Weight class: 63 kg
- Team: National Team
Medal record
World Championships
Gold medal – first place	1998 Lahti	Women's 63 kg
Gold medal – first place	1999 Athens	Women's 63 kg
- Updated on 28 September 2016

Chen Jui-lien (born 2 June 1971) is a Taiwanese weightlifter, competing in the 63 kg category and representing Chinese Taipei at international competitions. She competed at world championships, most recently at the 1999 World Weightlifting Championships.

She is a former world record holder with a total score (Clean & Jerk + Snatch) of 240.0 kg, set in Athens, Greece on 29 November 1999. The record was broken by Chen Xiaomin with a total score of 242.5 kg during the 2000 Summer Olympics on 19 September 2000.

== Career ==
Chen Jui-lien was born on 2 June 1971. She began her academic journey in sports science at the National Institute of Physical Education, where she studied in the Department of Sports Technology from 1986 to 1990. She later pursued a master's degree at Taipei Physical Education College (now University of Taipei), attending from 1999 to 2001. Her thesis involved a biomechanical analysis of the snatch movement in elite Taiwanese female weightlifters, reflecting her deep engagement in both the practical and scientific aspects of the sport.

Since August 1, 2001, Chen has served as an assistant professor in the Department of Athletics at the University of Taipei, where she teaches courses in weightlifting specialization, weight training, and sports massage. Chen emerged as one of the world's top competitors in the 63 kg weight class, dominating the sport from the mid-1990s through 1999. She was a world champion and held multiple world records during her career. Her coach at the time was Chiu Yuh-chuan.

In August 2000, just before the Sydney Olympic Games, Chen tested positive for metandienone, an anabolic steroid, during a pre-competition screening. Despite three subsequent negative tests and public appeals, including one from Taiwan's President Chen Shui-bian, Chen was banned by the International Weightlifting Federation (IWF) and barred from participating in the Olympics. The Chinese Taipei Weightlifting Federation opted not to enter her into the competition, citing concerns about the Olympic spirit. Chen received a two-year competition ban and a fine of NT$1,000,000.

== Major results ==
Competition summary
Year	Venue	Weight	Snatch (kg)				Clean & Jerk (kg)				Total	Rank
Year	Venue	Weight	1	2	3	Rank	1	2	3	Rank	Total	Rank
World Championships
1999	Piraeus, Greece	63 kg	105	107.5	~~110.5~~	1st place, gold medalist(s)	125	130	132.5	1st place, gold medalist(s)	240	1st place, gold medalist(s)
