= Kim Yong-ok =

Kim Yong-ok may refer to:

- Kim Yong-ok (weightlifter) (born 1976), North Korean Olympic weightlifter
- Do-ol (born 1948), pen name of the contemporary South Korean philosopher Yong-Ok Kim
