= Christina Ioannidi =

Greek weightlifter (born 1982)

Personal information
- Full name: Christina Ioannidi
- Nationality: Soviet Union; Greece
- Born: 4 January 1982 (age 44) Soviet Union
- Weight: 74.60 kg (164.5 lb)

Sport
- Country: Greece
- Sport: Weightlifting
- Weight class: 75 kg
- Club: Evmastas Piraia
- Team: National team
- Updated on 27 September 2016

Christina Ioannidi (original name: Χριστίνα Ιωαννίδη, born 4 January 1982) is a Soviet Union born Greek female retired weightlifter who competed in the 75 kg category and represented Greece at international competitions.

She participated at the 2004 Summer Olympics in the 75 kg event. She competed at world championships, most recently at the 2002 World Weightlifting Championships.

== Major results ==
Year	Venue	Weight	Snatch (kg)				Clean & Jerk (kg)				Total	Rank
Year	Venue	Weight	1	2	3	Rank	1	2	3	Rank	Total	Rank
Summer Olympics
2004	Athens, Greece	75 kg				—N/a				—N/a		5
World Championships
2002	Warsaw, Poland	75 kg	102.5	~~107.5~~	~~107.5~~	5	127.5	132.5	~~137.5~~	3rd place, bronze medalist(s)	235	3rd place, bronze medalist(s)
2001	Antalya, Turkey	75 kg	90	95	97.5	12	115	120	122.5	10	220	10
