= Tatyana Koshevnikova =

Kazakhstani weightlifter

Personal information
- Full name: Tatyana Koshevnikova
- Born: 1 January 1980 (age 46)
- Weight: 62.18 kg (137.1 lb)

Sport
- Country: Kazakhstan
- Sport: Weightlifting
- Weight class: 63 kg
- Team: National team
- Updated on 27 September 2016

Tatyana Koshevnikova (born 1 January 1980) is a Kazakhstani weightlifter, competing in the 63 kg category and representing Kazakhstan at international competitions. She competed at world championships, most recently at the 2001 World Weightlifting Championships.

== Major results ==
Year	Venue	Weight	Snatch (kg)				Clean & Jerk (kg)				Total	Rank
Year	Venue	Weight	1	2	3	Rank	1	2	3	Rank	Total	Rank
World Championships
2001	Antalya, Turkey	63 kg	~~75~~	75	80	17	95	~~100~~	~~100~~	17	175	17
1999	Piraeus, Greece	58 kg	60	65	~~70~~	36	75	80	~~85~~	35	145	35
