= Marie Jesika Dalou =

Mauritian weightlifter

Personal information
- Born: 27 July 1979 (age 47)
- Height: 163 cm (5 ft 4 in)
- Weight: 74.12 kg (163.4 lb)

Sport
- Country: Mauritius
- Sport: Weightlifting
- Weight class: 75 kg
- Team: National team
- Updated on 10 October 2016

Marie Jesika Dalou (born 27 July 1979) was a Mauritian weightlifter, competing in the 75 kg category and representing Mauritius at international competitions.

She participated at the 2004 Summer Olympics in the 75 kg event.

== Major results ==
Year	Venue	Weight	Snatch (kg)				Clean & Jerk (kg)				Total (kg)	Rank
Year	Venue	Weight	1	2	3	Rank	1	2	3	Rank	Total (kg)	Rank
Summer Olympics
2004	Sydney, Australia	75 kg	0.0	0.0	0.0	—N/a	0.0	0.0	0.0	—N/a	130.0	14
