= Weightlifting at the 2000 Summer Olympics – Women's 63 kg =

Weightlifting at the Olympics

Women's 63 kg at the Games of the XXVII Olympiad
- Venue: Sydney Convention and Exhibition Centre
- Date: 19 September 2000
- Competitors: 9 from 9 nations

Medalists
1st place, gold medalist(s)		Chen Xiaomin	China
2nd place, silver medalist(s)		Valentina Popova	Russia
3rd place, bronze medalist(s)		Ioanna Chatziioannou	Greece

The women's 63 kilograms weightlifting event at the 2000 Summer Olympics in Sydney, Australia took place at the Sydney Convention and Exhibition Centre on September 19.

Total score was the sum of the lifter's best result in each of the snatch and the clean and jerk, with three lifts allowed for each lift. In case of a tie, the lighter lifter won; if still tied, the lifter who took the fewest attempts to achieve the total score won. Lifters without a valid snatch score did not perform the clean and jerk.

== Schedule ==
All times are Australian Eastern Time (UTC+10:00)

Date	Time	Event
19 September 2000	14:30	Group A

== Records ==
Prior to this competition, the existing world and Olympic records were as follows.

World Record	Snatch	Lei Li (CHN)	110.0 kg	Chiba, Japan	2 May 1999
World Record	Clean & Jerk	Xiong Meiying (CHN)	132.5 kg	Athens, Greece	23 November 1999
World Record	Total	Chen Jui-lien (TPE)	240.0 kg	Athens, Greece	23 November 1999
Olympic Record	Snatch	Olympic Standard	110.0 kg	—	1 January 1997
Olympic Record	Clean & Jerk	Olympic Standard	132.5 kg	—	1 January 1997
Olympic Record	Total	Olympic Standard	240.0 kg	—	1 January 1997

== Results ==
Rank	Athlete	Group	Body weight	Snatch (kg)				Clean & Jerk (kg)				Total
Rank	Athlete	Group	Body weight	1	2	3	Result	1	2	3	Result	Total
1st place, gold medalist(s)	Chen Xiaomin (CHN)	A	62.82	105.0	110.0	112.5	112.5	130.0	~~135.0~~	—	130.0	242.5
2nd place, silver medalist(s)	Valentina Popova (RUS)	A	62.08	~~102.5~~	102.5	107.5	107.5	127.5	~~135.0~~	~~135.0~~	127.5	235.0
3rd place, bronze medalist(s)	Ioanna Chatziioannou (GRE)	A	61.82	90.0	95.0	97.5	97.5	117.5	125.0	—	125.0	222.5
4	Saipin Detsaeng (THA)	A	62.38	97.5	102.5	~~105.0~~	102.5	120.0	~~125.0~~	~~127.5~~	120.0	222.5
5	Kim Yong-ok (PRK)	A	59.06	85.0	90.0	~~92.5~~	90.0	115.0	~~120.0~~	~~120.0~~	115.0	205.0
6	Amanda Phillips (AUS)	A	62.96	77.5	~~82.5~~	82.5	82.5	100.0	105.0	107.5	107.5	190.0
7	Josefa Pérez (ESP)	A	62.36	80.0	82.5	85.0	85.0	95.0	100.0	102.5	102.5	187.5
8	Nora Köppel (ARG)	A	62.12	75.0	~~80.0~~	80.0	80.0	97.5	102.5	~~107.5~~	102.5	182.5
9	Kesaia Tawai (FIJ)	A	62.96	~~75.0~~	~~75.0~~	75.0	75.0	90.0	~~95.0~~	~~95.0~~	90.0	165.0

== New records ==
Snatch	112.5 kg	Chen Xiaomin (CHN)	WR
Total	242.5 kg	Chen Xiaomin (CHN)	WR
