= Anastasia Tsakiri =

Greek weightlifter (born 1979)

Personal information
- Full name: Anastasia Tsakiri
- Nationality: Greece
- Born: 2 February 1979 (age 47)
- Height: 160 cm (5 ft 3 in)
- Weight: 62.45 kg (137.7 lb)

Sport
- Country: Greece
- Sport: Weightlifting
- Weight class: 63 kg
- Team: National team
- Updated on 27 September 2016

Anastasia Tsakiri (Greek: Αναστασία Τσακίρη, born 2 February 1979) is a Greek female weightlifter, competing in the 63 kg category and representing Greece at international competitions. She participated at the 2004 Summer Olympics in the 63 kg event. She competed at world championships, most recently at the 2002 World Weightlifting Championships.

== Major results ==
Year	Venue	Weight	Snatch (kg)				Clean & Jerk (kg)				Total	Rank
Year	Venue	Weight	1	2	3	Rank	1	2	3	Rank	Total	Rank
Summer Olympics
2004	Athens, Greece	63 kg				—N/a				—N/a		DNF
World Championships
2002	Warsaw, Poland	63 kg	102.5	105	~~107.5~~	2nd place, silver medalist(s)	125	132.5	136	1st place, gold medalist(s)	240	2nd place, silver medalist(s)
2001	Antalya, Turkey	63 kg	97.5	100	102.5	2nd place, silver medalist(s)	120	125	~~127.5~~	1st place, gold medalist(s)	227.5	2nd place, silver medalist(s)
