= Slaveyka Ruzhinska =

Bulgarian weightlifter

Personal information
- Full name: Slaveyka Ruzhinska Nikolova
- Born: 30 January 1983 (age 43) Kubrat, People's Republic of Bulgaria
- Weight: 68.71 kg (151.5 lb)

Sport
- Country: Bulgaria
- Sport: Weightlifting
- Weight class: 69 kg
- Club: Ladimex, Burgas
- Team: National team
- Updated on 8 September 2016

Slaveyka Ruzhinska Nikolova (Bulgarian: Славейка Ружинска Николова; born 30 January 1983) was a Bulgarian weightlifter, competing in the 69 kg category and representing Bulgaria at international competitions.

She participated at the 2004 Summer Olympics in the 69 kg event. She competed at world championships, most recently at the 2007 World Weightlifting Championships.

== Major results ==
Year	Venue	Weight	Snatch (kg)				Clean & Jerk (kg)				Total	Rank
Year	Venue	Weight	1	2	3	Rank	1	2	3	Rank	Total	Rank
Summer Olympics
2004	Athens, Greece	69 kg										4
World Championships
2007	Chiang Mai, Thailand	69 kg	90	95	96	16	112	~~117~~	~~117~~	18	208	17
2003	Vancouver, Canada	75 kg	~~105~~	105	112.5	4	135	140	~~145~~	2nd place, silver medalist(s)	252.5	2nd place, silver medalist(s)
