= Nataliya Skakun =

Ukrainian weightlifter (born 1981)

Personal information
- Born: August 3, 1981 (age 45) Altai Kray, Soviet Union
Medal record
Women's Weightlifting
Representing Ukraine
Olympic Games
Gold medal – first place	2004 Athens	– 63 kg
World Championships
Gold medal – first place	2003 Vancouver	– 63 kg
European Championships
Gold medal – first place	2002 Antalya	– 63 kg
Bronze medal – third place	2000 Sofia	– 58 kg
Bronze medal – third place	2001 Trenčín	– 63 kg

Nataliya Anatoliïvna Skakun (Ukrainian: Наталія Анатоліївна Скакун; born August 3, 1981, in Altai Kray) is a Ukrainian weightlifter.

== Career ==
She competed in the women's 63 kg weight class at the 2004 Summer Olympics and won the gold medal, lifting 242.5 kg in total. During clean & jerk she lifted 135.0 kg, which was a new Olympic record. She also for a time held the world record, 138.0 kg, set when she became world champion in 2003.
