= Svetlana Khabirova =

Russian weightlifter (born 1978)

Personal information
- Full name: Svetlana Akhatovna Khabirova
- Born: 12 March 1978 (age 48) Sterlitamak, Russia
- Height: 164 cm (5 ft 5 in)
- Weight: 72.20 kg (159.2 lb)

Sport
- Country: Russia
- Sport: Weightlifting
- Weight class: 75 kg
- Club: Ministry of Defense Sports Club
- Team: National team
- Updated on 27 September 2016

Svetlana Akhatovna Khabirova (original name: Светлана Ахатовна Хабирова; born 12 March 1978 in Sterlitamak) was a Russian weightlifter, competing in the 75 kg category and representing Russia at international competitions.

She participated at the 2000 Summer Olympics in the 75 kg event. She competed at the 2002 World Weightlifting Championships.

== Major results ==
Year	Venue	Weight	Snatch (kg)				Clean & jerk (kg)				Total	Rank
Year	Venue	Weight	1	2	3	Rank	1	2	3	Rank	Total	Rank
Summer Olympics
2000	Sydney, Australia	75 kg				—N/a				—N/a		6
World Championships
2002	Warsaw, Poland	75 kg	110	115	117.5	1st place, gold medalist(s)	~~140~~	140	145	1st place, gold medalist(s)	262.5	1st place, gold medalist(s)
2001	Antalya, Turkey	69 kg	105	107.5	110	3rd place, bronze medalist(s)	130	135	140	2nd place, silver medalist(s)	250	2nd place, silver medalist(s)
1999	Piraeus, Greece	75 kg	95	~~100~~	~~100~~	15	115	120	125	6	220	12
