= Gergana Kirilova =

Bulgarian weightlifter (born 1972)

Personal information
- Full name: Gergana Kirilova
- Born: 18 June 1972 (age 54)
- Weight: 62.92 kg (138.7 lb)

Sport
- Country: Bulgaria
- Sport: Weightlifting
- Weight class: 63 kg
- Team: National team
- Updated on 11 September 2016

Gergana Kirilova (Bulgarian: Гергана Кирилова) (born 18 June 1972) is a Bulgarian weightlifter, competing in the 63 kg category and representing Bulgaria at international competitions. She competed at world championships, most recently at the 2006 World Weightlifting Championships.

Kirilova tested positive for a steroid in 2008 during an out-of-competition test, along with ten other weightlifters, and therefore Bulgaria's weightlifting federation withdrew its team from the 2008 Summer Olympics in Beijing, China. Apart from Cholakov the athletes who tested positive were Ivailo Filev, Alan Tsagaev, Velichko Cholakov, Ivan Stoitsov, Ivan Markov, Georgi Markov, Demir Demirev, Milka Maneva, Donka Mincheva and Mehmed Fikretov.

== Major results ==
Year	Venue	Weight	Snatch (kg)				Clean & Jerk (kg)				Total	Rank
Year	Venue	Weight	1	2	3	Rank	1	2	3	Rank	Total	Rank
World Championships
2006	Santo Domingo, Dominican Republic	63 kg	93	~~95~~	95	10	112	~~115~~	~~115~~	18	207.0	13
2003	Vancouver, Canada	63 kg	105	~~110~~	~~110~~	4	~~125~~	125	130	4	235	5
2002	Warsaw, Poland	63 kg	100	102.5	~~105~~	3rd place, bronze medalist(s)	120	122.5	~~125~~	3rd place, bronze medalist(s)	225	3rd place, bronze medalist(s)
2001	Antalya, Turkey	63 kg	90	95	97.5	5	110	115	117.5	5	215	5
1999	Piraeus, Greece	63 kg	~~85~~	85	~~90~~	16	102.5	~~107.5~~	107.5	15	192.5	16

== See also ==
- Georgi Markov (weightlifter)
- Bulgarian records in Olympic weightlifting
