= Kang Mi-suk (weightlifter) =

South Korean weightlifter

Personal information
- Full name: Kang Mi-suk
- Born: 19 August 1977 (age 48)
- Height: 162 cm (5 ft 4 in)
- Weight: 68.68 kg (151.4 lb)

Sport
- Country: South Korea
- Sport: Weightlifting
- Weight class: 69 kg
- Team: National team
- Updated on 13 September 2016

- Kang Mi-suk
- Hangul: 강미숙
- RR: Gang Misuk
- MR: Kang Misuk

Kang Mi-suk (Korean: 강미숙; born 19 August 1977) is a South Korean weightlifter, competing in the 69 kg category and representing South Korea at international competitions.

She participated at the 2004 Summer Olympics in the 69 kg event. She competed at world championships, most recently at the 2003 World Weightlifting Championships.

== Major results ==
Year	Venue	Weight	Snatch (kg)				Clean & jerk (kg)				Total	Rank
Year	Venue	Weight	1	2	3	Rank	1	2	3	Rank	Total	Rank
Summer Olympics
2004	Athens, Italy	69 kg				—N/a				—N/a		DNF
World Championships
2003	Vancouver, Canada	69 kg	97.5	~~100~~	~~100~~	12	120	~~125~~	~~125~~	13	217.5	13
