= Deborah Acason =

Australian weightlifter (born 1983)

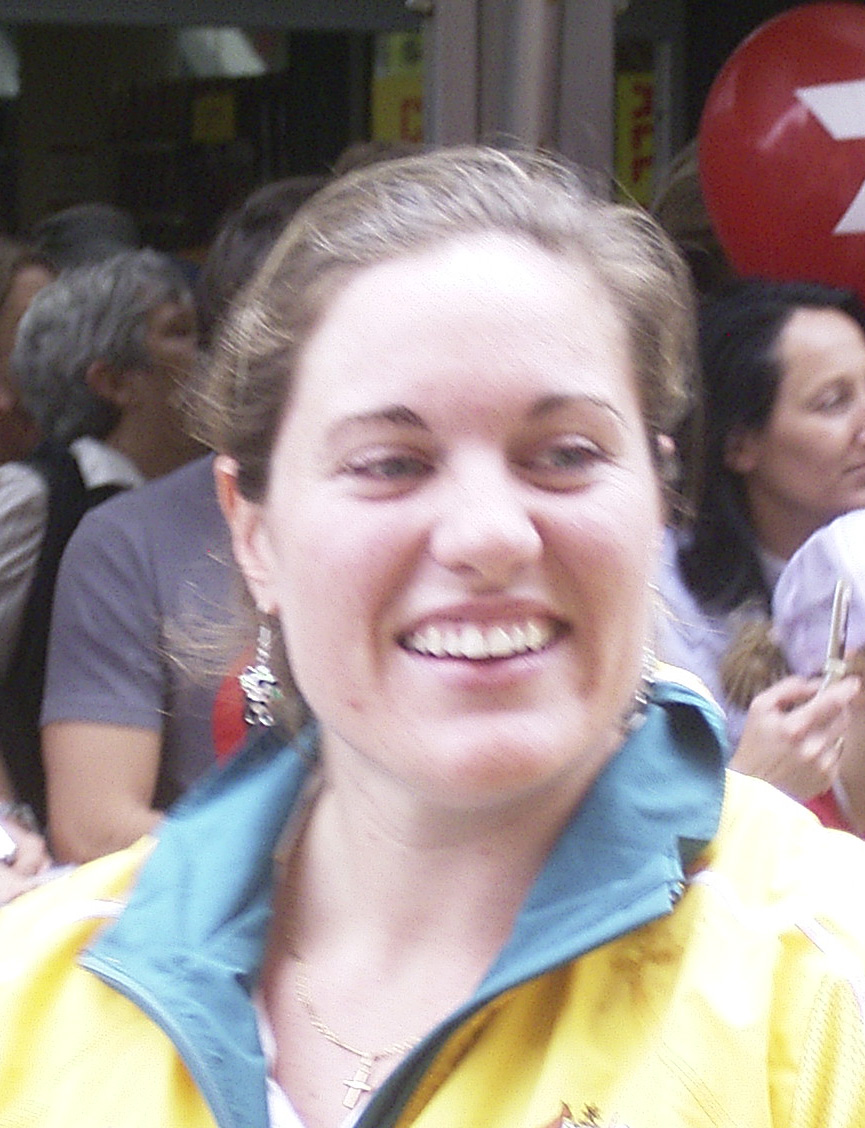
- Deborah Acason at the 2008; Olympic Homecoming Parade in Brisbane

Medal record

Women's Weightlifting

Representing Australia

Commonwealth Games
| Gold medal – first place | 2006 Melbourne | 75 kg |
| Silver medal – second place | 2002 Manchester | 75 kg snatch |
| Silver medal – second place | 2002 Manchester | 75 kg clean & jerk |
| Silver medal – second place | 2002 Manchester | 75 kg combined |
| Bronze medal – third place | 2010 Delhi | +75 kg |

Deborah Esther Ainslie Acason (née Lovely, born 20 June 1983) is an Australian weightlifter. Initially a discus thrower (she won a bronze medal at the 1999 World Youth Championships in Athletics), she won three silver medals at the 2002 Commonwealth Games, a gold medal at the 2006 Commonwealth Games and a bronze medal at the 2010 Commonwealth Games. She also participated in the 2004 and 2008 Olympic games. She also won awards in cycling, winning the 2005 Queensland open Keirin title, as well as gold medals in the 1 Lap Time Trial and Team Sprint. She competed at the 2018 Commonwealth Games where she placed 4th. This was her 5th Commonwealth Games Appearance.

Starting her sports career in throwing Acason has been coached in weightlifting by Michael Keelan since her beginnings.

She married Joshua Acason in December 2008. They have three daughters.

She is Christian and has been active in the Presbyterian church.

In terms of her faith, she states "Without Jesus' love and forgiveness I know my life would be very different. I would have lived my life my way and made me the centre of everything and most likely made a mess of it all. I would not be married to my loving husband with three beautiful girls."

Acason was an unsuccessful Family First Party candidate for Bundamba at the 2012 Queensland state election.

Acason has a double degree from Griffith University in Laws and Criminology and Criminal Justice, which she studied from 2002 to 2010.
