= Madeleine Yamechi =

Camaroonian-French weightlifter

Personal information
- Full name: Madeleine Yamechi Sielanou
- Born: 6 March 1982 (age 44)
- Height: 162 cm (5 ft 4 in)
- Weight: 84.32 kg (185.9 lb)

Sport
- Country: Cameroon; France
- Sport: Weightlifting
- Team: National team
- Updated on 31 August 2016

Madeleine Yamechi Sielanou (born 6 March 1982) is a Camaroonian-French female weightlifter.

She represented Cameroon at the 2004 Summer Olympics. Later she started representing France at international competitions. She competed at world championships, including at the 2015 World Weightlifting Championships.

== Major results ==
Year	Venue	Weight	Snatch (kg)				Clean & Jerk (kg)				Total	Rank
Year	Venue	Weight	1	2	3	Rank	1	2	3	Rank	Total	Rank
World Championships
2015	Houston, United States	+75 kg	~~88~~	88	90	32	110	115	~~117~~	30	205	31
2014	Almaty, Kazakhstan	+75 kg	88	90	~~94~~	24	110	113	~~115~~	24	203	24
2007	Chiang Mai, Thailand	69 kg	97	99	101	12	~~124~~	~~124~~	~~125~~	---	0	---
2006	Santo Domingo, Dominican Republic	69 kg	97	~~100~~	~~100~~	10	121	~~124~~	124	6	221.0	6
2005	Doha, Qatar	75 kg	93	96	~~100~~	12	122	~~125~~	~~125~~	9	218.0	11
2003	Vancouver, Canada	69 kg	97.5	~~102.5~~	~~102.5~~	10	127.5	132.5	~~135~~	6	230	9
2001	Antalya, Turkey	69 kg	92.5	~~97.5~~	~~97.5~~	10	120	125	~~127.5~~	8	217.5	8
1999	Piraeus, Greece	69 kg	82.5	87.5	90	18	107.5	112.5	115	15	205	16
