= Ioanna Chatziioannou =

Greek weightlifter (born 1973)

Personal information
- Born: 22 October 1973 (age 52) Georgia
- Height: 163 cm (5 ft 4 in)
- Weight: 63 kg (139 lb)
Medal record
Women's Weightlifting
Representing Greece
Olympic Games
Bronze medal – third place	2000 Sydney	– 63 kg
European Championships
Gold medal – first place	1997 Sevilla	– 64 kg
Silver medal – second place	1996 Prague	– 64 kg
Silver medal – second place	1999 La Coruña	– 63 kg

Ioanna Chatziioannou (Greek: Ιωάννα Χατζηιωάννου; born 22 October 1973 in Georgia) is a retired female weightlifter from Greece. She became an Olympic medalist during the 2000 Summer Olympics when she won the bronze medal in the women's – 63 kg class.
