= Sun Ruiping =

Chinese weightlifter (born 1981)

Personal information
- Full name: Sun Ruiping
- Born: 5 January 1981 (age 45)
- Weight: 74.70 kg (164.7 lb)

Sport
- Country: China
- Sport: Weightlifting
- Weight class: 75 kg
- Team: National team
- Updated on 27 September 2016

Sun Ruiping (born 5 January 1981) is a Chinese weightlifter, competing in the 75 kg category and representing China at international competitions. She competed at world championships, most recently at the 2002 World Weightlifting Championships.

She set a new world record in the Clean & Jerk with 152.5 kg and also a new world record with a total score of 270.0 kg, both on 7 October 2002 in Busan, South Korea.

== Major results ==
Year	Venue	Weight	Snatch (kg)				Clean & Jerk (kg)				Total	Rank
Year	Venue	Weight	1	2	3	Rank	1	2	3	Rank	Total	Rank
World Championships
2002	Warsaw, Poland	75 kg	~~110~~	110	115	2nd place, silver medalist(s)	140	145	~~150~~	2nd place, silver medalist(s)	260	2nd place, silver medalist(s)
