= Hong Yong-ok =

North Korean weightlifter (born 1986)

Personal information
- Nationality: North Korea
- Born: 19 August 1986 (age 39)
- Height: 1.60 m (5 ft 3 in)
- Weight: 69 kg (152 lb)

Korean name
- Hangul: 홍영옥
- RR: Hong Yeongok
- MR: Hong Yŏngok

Sport
- Sport: Weightlifting
- Event: 69 kg

Hong Yong-ok (Korean: 홍영옥; born August 19, 1986) is a North Korean weightlifter. Hong represented North Korea at the 2008 Summer Olympics in Beijing, where she competed for the women's light heavyweight category (69 kg). Hong, however, did not finish the event, after failing to lift a single-motion snatch of 103 kg in three attempts.
