= Kim Yong-ok (weightlifter) =

North Korean weightlifter (born 1976)

Personal information
- Born: 11 February 1976 (age 49)
- Weight: 59.06 kg (130.2 lb)

Korean name
- Hangul: 김영옥
- RR: Gim Yeongok
- MR: Kim Yŏngok

Sport
- Country: North Korea
- Sport: Weightlifting
- Weight class: 63 kg
- Team: National team
- Updated on 10 October 2016

Kim Yong-ok (Korean: 김영옥; born 11 February 1976) is a North Korean weightlifter, who competed in the 63 kg category and represented North Korea at international competitions.

She participated at the 2000 Summer Olympics in the 63 kg event. She competed at world championships, at the 1999 World Weightlifting Championships.

== Major results ==
Year	Venue	Weight	Snatch (kg)				Clean & Jerk (kg)				Total	Rank
Year	Venue	Weight	1	2	3	Rank	1	2	3	Rank	Total	Rank
Summer Olympics
2000	Sydney, Australia	63 kg	85	90	~~92.5~~	—N/a	115	~~120~~	~~120~~	—N/a	205	5
World Championships
1999	Piraeus, Greece	63 kg	90	~~97.5~~	~~97.5~~	8	~~120~~	~~120~~	120	6	210	7
