= Pascale Dorcelus =

Canadian weightlifter

Personal information
- Nationality: Canadian
- Born: December 27, 1979 (age 46)

Sport
- Sport: Weightlifting
Medal record
Commonwealth Games
| Gold medal – first place | 2002 Manchester | 63kg snatch |
| Bronze medal – third place | 2002 Manchester | 63kg total |

Pascale Dorcelus (born 27 December 1979) is a Canadian weightlifter.

Dorcelus competed at the 2002 Commonwealth Games where she won a gold medal in the 63 kg snatch event and a bronze medal in the 63 kg total event.
