= Nahla Ramadan =

Egyptian weightlifter (born 1985)

Nahla Ramadan Mohamed (Arabic: نَهْلَة رَمَضَان مُحَمَّد; born 4 April 1985 in Alexandria, Egypt) is an Egyptian weightlifter and the pioneer of weightlifting in Egypt, Africa and the Arab world. She competed for Egypt at the 2004 Summer Olympics and 2012 Summer Olympics. At the 2004 Summer Olympics, competing in the heavyweight division, she did not finish the competition, being unable to register a lift in the clean and jerk. At the 2012 Summer Olympics, she competed in the super-heavyweight category and finished fifth.

However, four years later, in 2016, samples taken at London 2012 from the Armenian bronze medalist Hripsime Khurshudyan were tested positive for prohibited substances. Therefore, Ramadan, who initially placed fifth, came in fourth place.

== Achievements ==
In 2003, at the world junior weightlifting Grand Prix championship in Budapest, Ramadan became the game's top-ranked athlete after collecting three gold medals and breaking two world records in the process, an unprecedented accomplishment for an Egyptian of any sex in the sport.

When she was just 18 years old, she set a new world record of 145 kg in the jerk, two kilograms more than that of Bulgaria's Krenz Geuiguny. Ramadan's second world record was in the total number of kilograms lifted: 260 kg, again at Geuiguny's expense and her previous record of 255 kg. In the snatch, Ramadan heaved 115 kg to clinch her third gold medal, but this time failed to break the world record.

In 2002, she won two silver medals and a bronze in the World Championships in the Czech Republic, and two bronze medals for the clean & jerk lift and total. in 2003 at the World Championships in Poland. In 2006, she won the bronze medal for the snatch lift at the World Championships in Dominican Republic.

Ramadan won three gold medals in the 2003 World Weightlifting Championships – Women's 75 kg, when the Chinese weightlifting champion Shang Shichun was stripped of her medals as she was tested positive on a drug test.

She also won three gold medals at the 2007 All-Africa Games.

== Family and childhood ==
Ramadan was born into a family of weightlifters in Alexandria's district of Al-Wardyan. Her father Ramadan Mohamed El-Sayed was a national weightlifting champion and later head coach of the Alexandria weightlifting zone.

A student at the Cleopatra Experimental School in Alexandria, Ramadan was first spotted by the Bulgarian Yurden Ivanov, the former world and Olympic champion who was selected as head coach of all Egyptian national teams. Ivanov canvassed the country in a bid to select the most promising athletes and was quickly impressed with Ramadan. He predicted that she would become a world champion.
