= Chen Xiaomin =

Chinese weightlifter (born 1977)

Personal information
- Nationality: Australian
- Born: February 7, 1977 (age 49) Heshan, Guangdong
Medal record
Women's weightlifting
Representing China
Olympic Games
Gold medal – first place	2000 Sydney	63 kg

Chen Xiaomin (Chinese: 陈晓敏; pinyin: Chén Xiǎomǐn; born February 7, 1977, in Heshan, Guangdong) is a female Chinese weightlifter. She began weightlifting in 1989, and joined the provincial team in 1991, and the national team in 1992.

She is also a law graduate from Guangdong Business College.

== Major performances ==
- 1993 National Games - 1st 54 kg (surpassing three ARs on six occasions)
- 1993 World Women's Championships - 1st 54 kg snatch, C&J & total (three WRs)
- 1994 National Championships - 1st 59 kg
- 1994 Hiroshima Asian Games - 1st 59 kg (equalling WR with 97.5 kg in snatch and breaking WRs with 122.5 kg in C&J and 220 kg in two-lift total)
- 1995 World Women's Championships - 1st 59 kg snatch, C&J & total (92.5 kg, 122.5 kg & 215 kg, rewriting WR in C&J with 123.5 kg), 1st team
- 1996 Asian Championships - 1st 59 kg total (207.5 kg)
- 1996 Warsaw World Women's Championships - 1st 59 kg snatch (97.5 kg) & total (207.5 kg), breaking WR in snatch (99 kg); 2nd C&J (110 kg)
- 1997 Asian Women's Championships - 1st 64 kg snatch, C&J & total (breaking WR in snatch with 107.5 kg)
- 2000 Sydney Olympic Games - 1st 63 kg class
