= 2002 World Weightlifting Championships =

International weightlifting competition

2002 World Championships
- Host city: Warsaw, Poland
- Dates: 18–26 November
- Main venue: Torwar Hall

The 2002 World Weightlifting Championships were held in Warsaw, Poland from November 18 to November 26, 2002.

== Medal summary ==
=== Men ===
Event	Gold		Silver		Bronze	
56 kg
Snatch	Wu Meijin; China	127.5 kg	Yang Chin-yi; Chinese Taipei	125.0 kg	Adrian Jigău; Romania	125.0 kg
Clean & Jerk	Wu Meijin; China	160.0 kg	Wang Shin-yuan; Chinese Taipei	152.5 kg	Yang Chin-yi; Chinese Taipei	152.5 kg
Total	Wu Meijin; China	287.5 kg	Yang Chin-yi; Chinese Taipei	277.5 kg	Adrian Jigău; Romania	277.5 kg
62 kg
Snatch	Le Maosheng; China	140.0 kg	Leonidas Sabanis; Greece	140.0 kg	Im Yong-su; North Korea	140.0 kg
Clean & Jerk	Im Yong-su; North Korea	175.0 kg	Stefan Georgiev; Bulgaria	172.5 kg	Le Maosheng; China	170.0 kg
Total	Im Yong-su; North Korea	315.0 kg	Le Maosheng; China	310.0 kg	Stefan Georgiev; Bulgaria	310.0 kg
69 kg
Snatch	Chen Chufu; China	157.5 kg	Zhang Guozheng; China	155.0 kg	Youssef Sbai; Tunisia	152.5 kg
Clean & Jerk	Zhang Guozheng; China	192.5 kg	Chen Chufu; China	187.5 kg	Mohamed El-Tantawy; Egypt	187.5 kg
Total	Zhang Guozheng; China	347.5 kg	Chen Chufu; China	345.0 kg	Youssef Sbai; Tunisia	335.0 kg
77 kg
Snatch	Li Hongli; China	172.5 kg	Georgi Markov; Bulgaria	170.0 kg	Mohammad Hossein Barkhah; Iran	165.0 kg
Clean & Jerk	Oleg Perepetchenov; Russia	202.5 kg	Reyhan Arabacıoğlu; Turkey	200.0 kg	Georgi Markov; Bulgaria	200.0 kg
Total	Georgi Markov; Bulgaria	370.0 kg	Oleg Perepetchenov; Russia	367.5 kg	Mohammad Hossein Barkhah; Iran	365.0 kg
85 kg
Snatch	Giorgi Asanidze; Georgia	177.5 kg	Ilirjan Suli; Albania	175.0 kg	Ruslan Novikau; Belarus	172.5 kg
Clean & Jerk	Zlatan Vanev; Bulgaria	217.5 kg	Ruslan Novikau; Belarus	207.5 kg	Valeriu Calancea; Romania	207.5 kg
Total	Zlatan Vanev; Bulgaria	385.0 kg	Giorgi Asanidze; Georgia	385.0 kg	Ruslan Novikau; Belarus	380.0 kg
94 kg
Snatch	Oliver Caruso; Germany	180.0 kg	Nizami Pashayev; Azerbaijan	177.5 kg	Milen Dobrev; Bulgaria	175.0 kg
Clean & Jerk	Nizami Pashayev; Azerbaijan	215.0 kg	Milen Dobrev; Bulgaria	212.5 kg	Kourosh Bagheri; Iran	210.0 kg
Total	Nizami Pashayev; Azerbaijan	392.5 kg	Milen Dobrev; Bulgaria	387.5 kg	Oliver Caruso; Germany	387.5 kg
105 kg
Snatch	Vladimir Smorchkov; Russia	197.5 kg	Marcin Dołęga; Poland	192.5 kg	Denys Hotfrid; Ukraine	190.0 kg
Clean & Jerk	Alan Tsagaev; Bulgaria	232.5 kg	Bünyamin Sudaş; Turkey	230.0 kg	Denys Hotfrid; Ukraine	230.0 kg
Total	Denys Hotfrid; Ukraine	420.0 kg	Alan Tsagaev; Bulgaria	417.5 kg	Vladimir Smorchkov; Russia	417.5 kg
+105 kg
Snatch	Hossein Rezazadeh; Iran	210.0 kg	Damyan Damyanov; Bulgaria	205.0 kg	Artem Udachyn; Ukraine	200.0 kg
Clean & Jerk	Hossein Rezazadeh; Iran	263.0 kg WR	Damyan Damyanov; Bulgaria	245.0 kg	Paweł Najdek; Poland	240.0 kg
Total	Hossein Rezazadeh; Iran	472.5 kg	Damyan Damyanov; Bulgaria	450.0 kg	Artem Udachyn; Ukraine	440.0 kg

=== Women ===
Event	Gold		Silver		Bronze	
48 kg
Snatch	Wang Mingjuan; China	92.5 kg WR	Nurcan Taylan; Turkey	87.5 kg	Izabela Dragneva; Bulgaria	82.5 kg
Clean & Jerk	Wang Mingjuan; China	115.5 kg WR	Nurcan Taylan; Turkey	105.0 kg	Izabela Dragneva; Bulgaria	100.0 kg
Total	Wang Mingjuan; China	207.5 kg WR	Nurcan Taylan; Turkey	192.5 kg	Izabela Dragneva; Bulgaria	182.5 kg
53 kg
Snatch	Ri Song-hui; North Korea	97.5 kg	Li Xuejiu; China	95.0 kg	Udomporn Polsak; Thailand	95.0 kg
Clean & Jerk	Li Xuejiu; China	127.5 kg WR	Ri Song-hui; North Korea	127.5 kg	Udomporn Polsak; Thailand	120.0 kg
Total	Ri Song-hui; North Korea	225.0 kg	Li Xuejiu; China	222.5 kg	Udomporn Polsak; Thailand	215.0 kg
58 kg
Snatch	Song Zhijuan; China	105.0 kg	Charikleia Kastritsi; Greece	97.5 kg	Emine Bilgin; Turkey	95.0 kg
Clean & Jerk	Song Zhijuan; China	125.0 kg	Wandee Kameaim; Thailand	120.0 kg	Maryse Turcotte; Canada	117.5 kg
Total	Song Zhijuan; China	230.0 kg	Wandee Kameaim; Thailand	212.5 kg	Charikleia Kastritsi; Greece	210.0 kg
63 kg
Snatch	Liu Xia; China	107.5 kg	Anastasia Tsakiri; Greece	105.0 kg	Gergana Kirilova; Bulgaria	102.5 kg
Clean & Jerk	Anastasia Tsakiri; Greece	136.0 kg WR	Liu Xia; China	135.0 kg	Gergana Kirilova; Bulgaria	122.5 kg
Total	Liu Xia; China	242.5 kg	Anastasia Tsakiri; Greece	240.0 kg	Gergana Kirilova; Bulgaria	225.0 kg
69 kg
Snatch	Valentina Popova; Russia	115.0 kg	Pawina Thongsuk; Thailand	112.5 kg	Nahla Ramadan; Egypt	110.0 kg
Clean & Jerk	Pawina Thongsuk; Thailand	147.5 kg	Liu Chunhong; China	147.5 kg	Valentina Popova; Russia	142.5 kg
Total	Pawina Thongsuk; Thailand	260.0 kg	Valentina Popova; Russia	257.5 kg	Nahla Ramadan; Egypt	245.0 kg
75 kg
Snatch	Svetlana Khabirova; Russia	117.5 kg	Sun Ruiping; China	115.0 kg	Ilona Dankó; Hungary	107.5 kg
Clean & Jerk	Svetlana Khabirova; Russia	145.0 kg	Sun Ruiping; China	145.0 kg	Christina Ioannidi; Greece	132.5 kg
Total	Svetlana Khabirova; Russia	262.5 kg	Sun Ruiping; China	260.0 kg	Christina Ioannidi; Greece	235.0 kg
+75 kg
Snatch	Albina Khomich; Russia	132.5 kg	Agata Wróbel; Poland	125.0 kg	Cheryl Haworth; United States	125.0 kg
Clean & Jerk	Agata Wróbel; Poland	162.5 kg	Tang Gonghong; China	160.0 kg	Cheryl Haworth; United States	152.5 kg
Total	Agata Wróbel; Poland	287.5 kg	Albina Khomich; Russia	282.5 kg	Tang Gonghong; China	277.5 kg

== Medal table ==
Ranking by Big (Total result) medals

Rank	Nation	Gold	Silver	Bronze	Total
1	China	5	4	1	10
2	Bulgaria	2	3	3	8
3	North Korea	2	0	0	2
4	Russia	1	3	1	5
5	Thailand	1	1	1	3
6	Iran	1	0	1	2
6	Ukraine	1	0	1	2
8	Azerbaijan	1	0	0	1
8	Poland	1	0	0	1
10	Greece	0	1	2	3
11	Chinese Taipei	0	1	0	1
11	Georgia	0	1	0	1
11	Turkey	0	1	0	1
14	Belarus	0	0	1	1
14	Egypt	0	0	1	1
14	Germany	0	0	1	1
14	Romania	0	0	1	1
14	Tunisia	0	0	1	1
Totals (18 entries)		15	15	15	45

Ranking by all medals: Big (Total result) and Small (Snatch and Clean & Jerk)

Rank	Nation	Gold	Silver	Bronze	Total
1	China	17	12	2	31
2	Russia	7	3	2	12
3	Bulgaria	4	8	9	21
4	North Korea	4	1	1	6
5	Iran	3	0	3	6
6	Thailand	2	3	3	8
7	Poland	2	2	1	5
8	Azerbaijan	2	1	0	3
9	Greece	1	4	3	8
10	Georgia	1	1	0	2
11	Ukraine	1	0	4	5
12	Germany	1	0	1	2
13	Turkey	0	5	1	6
14	Chinese Taipei	0	3	1	4
15	Belarus	0	1	2	3
16	Albania	0	1	0	1
17	Egypt	0	0	3	3
17	Romania	0	0	3	3
19	Tunisia	0	0	2	2
19	United States	0	0	2	2
21	Canada	0	0	1	1
21	Hungary	0	0	1	1
Totals (22 entries)		45	45	45	135

== Team ranking ==
=== Men ===
Rank	Team	Points
1	China	484
2	Bulgaria	482
3	Turkey	410
4	Poland	372
5	Russia	344
6	Ukraine	344

=== Women ===
Rank	Team	Points
1	China	494
2	Russia	414
3	Hungary	322
4	Bulgaria	319
5	Greece	312
6	Ukraine	288

== Participating nations ==
285 competitors from 54 nations competed.

- Albania (2)
- Algeria (2)
- Argentina (1)
- Armenia (4)
- Australia (4)
- Austria (2)
- Azerbaijan (6)
- Belarus (7)
- Bulgaria (13)
- Cameroon (1)
- Canada (7)
- Chile (1)
- China (15)
- Chinese Taipei (7)
- Colombia (5)
- Croatia (2)
- Cyprus (2)
- Czech Republic (3)
- Denmark (1)
- Ecuador (4)
- Egypt (6)
- Finland (4)
- France (7)
- Georgia (4)
- Germany (5)
- Great Britain (3)
- Greece (11)
- Hong Kong (1)
- Hungary (9)
- Iceland (1)
- Iran (8)
- Iraq (2)
- Ireland (1)
- Israel (1)
- Italy (8)
- Japan (12)
- Kazakhstan (7)
- Latvia (5)
- Mexico (1)
- Netherlands (1)
- North Korea (2)
- Norway (1)
- Poland (14)
- Romania (5)
- Russia (14)
- Slovakia (5)
- Spain (15)
- Sweden (2)
- Thailand (3)
- Tunisia (1)
- Turkey (12)
- Turkmenistan (3)
- Ukraine (13)
- United States (9)
