= Valentina Popova =

Russian weightlifter (born 1972)

Medal record

Representing Russia

Women's Weightlifting

Olympic Games
Silver medal – second place	2000 Sydney	– 63 kg
Bronze medal – third place	2004 Athens	– 75 kg

World Championships
Gold medal – first place	2001 Antalya	– 69 kg
Bronze medal – third place	1998 Lahti	– 63 kg
Bronze medal – third place	1999 Athens	– 63 kg

European Championships
Gold medal – first place	1999 La Coruña	– 63 kg
Gold medal – first place	2000 Sofia	– 63 kg
Gold medal – first place	2001 Trencin	– 63 kg
Gold medal – first place	2003 Loutraki	– 69 kg
Silver medal – second place	1998 Riesa	– 63 kg
Silver medal – second place	2005 Sofia	– 75 kg

Valentina Vadimovna Popova (Russian: Валентина Вадимовна Попова) (born September 25, 1972 in Bratsk) is a Russian weightlifter who won two olympic medals: the silver medal in the 63 kg class at the 2000 Summer Olympics and the bronze medal in the 75 kg class at the 2004 Summer Olympics.
