= 1999 World Weightlifting Championships – Women's 69 kg =

The Women's Light-Heavyweight Weightlifting Event (69 kilograms) is the fifth women's weight class event at the weightlifting competition, limited to competitors with a maximum of 69 kilograms of body mass. The competition at the 1999 World Weightlifting Championships took place in Athens, Greece on November 24, 1999.

Each lifter performed in both the snatch and clean and jerk lifts, with the final score being the sum of the lifter's best result in each. The athlete received three attempts in each of the two lifts; the score for the lift was the heaviest weight successfully lifted.

== Medalists ==
Event	Gold		Silver		Bronze	
Snatch	Erzsébet Márkus (HUN)	107.5 kg	Milena Trendafilova (BUL)	105.0 kg	Sun Tianni (CHN)	105.0 kg
Clean & Jerk	Sun Tianni (CHN)	142.5 kg	Irina Kasimova (RUS)	130.0 kg	Milena Trendafilova (BUL)	127.5 kg
Total	Sun Tianni (CHN)	247.5 kg	Milena Trendafilova (BUL)	232.5 kg	Erzsébet Márkus (HUN)	232.5 kg

== Records ==
Prior to this competition, the existing world records were as follows.

World record	Snatch	Sun Tianni (CHN)	111.0 kg	Bangkok, Thailand	11 December 1998
World record	Clean & Jerk	Lin Weining (CHN)	142.5 kg	Wuhan, China	3 September 1999
World record	Total	Lin Weining (CHN)	252.5 kg	Wuhan, China	3 September 1999

== Results ==
Rank	Athlete	Body weight	Snatch (kg)				Clean & Jerk (kg)				Total
Rank	Athlete	Body weight	1	2	3	Rank	1	2	3	Rank	Total
1st place, gold medalist(s)	Sun Tianni (CHN)	67.80	~~105.0~~	105.0	~~107.5~~	3rd place, bronze medalist(s)	132.5	137.5	143.0	1st place, gold medalist(s)	247.5
2nd place, silver medalist(s)	Milena Trendafilova (BUL)	66.99	100.0	~~105.0~~	105.0	2nd place, silver medalist(s)	127.5	~~130.0~~	~~130.0~~	3rd place, bronze medalist(s)	232.5
3rd place, bronze medalist(s)	Erzsébet Márkus (HUN)	68.52	100.0	105.0	107.5	1st place, gold medalist(s)	120.0	125.0	~~127.5~~	6	232.5
4	Pawina Thongsuk (THA)	66.42	100.0	102.5	~~105.0~~	4	~~125.0~~	125.0	~~130.0~~	5	227.5
5	Irina Kasimova (RUS)	68.92	~~97.5~~	97.5	~~102.5~~	11	130.0	~~137.5~~	~~137.5~~	2nd place, silver medalist(s)	227.5
6	Aphinya Pharksupho (THA)	66.19	~~95.0~~	95.0	100.0	5	120.0	125.0	~~130.0~~	4	225.0
7	Olga Glaz (RUS)	67.93	~~95.0~~	95.0	100.0	6	117.5	122.5	~~127.5~~	7	222.5
8	Lea Foreman (USA)	68.30	95.0	100.0	~~102.5~~	8	115.0	120.0	~~122.5~~	11	220.0
9	Beata Prei (POL)	68.54	92.5	97.5	~~100.0~~	10	122.5	~~127.5~~	~~127.5~~	9	220.0
10	Daniela Kerkelova (BUL)	68.04	90.0	~~95.0~~	95.0	12	115.0	120.0	~~125.0~~	10	215.0
11	Maria Tatsi (GRE)	68.00	87.5	~~90.0~~	~~90.0~~	22	115.0	120.0	122.5	8	210.0
12	Michelle Kettner (AUS)	67.70	92.5	97.5	~~100.0~~	9	110.0	~~117.5~~	~~117.5~~	17	207.5
13	Elizabeth Jeremiah (NGR)	68.19	92.5	~~97.5~~	~~97.5~~	15	110.0	115.0	~~117.5~~	14	207.5
14	Vanda Maslovska (UKR)	68.53	92.5	~~95.0~~	95.0	14	112.5	~~117.5~~	~~117.5~~	16	207.5
15	Park Mi-jung (KOR)	68.77	85.0	~~90.0~~	90.0	19	112.5	117.5	~~120.0~~	13	207.5
16	Madeleine Yamechi (CMR)	68.74	82.5	87.5	90.0	18	107.5	112.5	115.0	15	205.0
17	Eva Dimas (ESA)	68.47	~~90.0~~	~~90.0~~	92.5	16	110.0	~~115.0~~	~~115.0~~	19	202.5
18	Khadijah Hunter (USA)	68.25	87.5	92.5	95.0	13	102.5	~~110.0~~	~~110.0~~	26	197.5
19	Julie Malenfant (CAN)	66.09	90.0	~~92.5~~	~~92.5~~	17	100.0	~~105.0~~	105.0	22	195.0
20	Miosotis Heredia (DOM)	67.82	87.5	~~92.5~~	~~92.5~~	21	~~105.0~~	105.0	~~110.0~~	24	192.5
21	Susanna Samuelsson (FIN)	68.26	80.0	82.5	~~85.0~~	25	107.5	110.0	~~112.5~~	18	192.5
22	Ewa Kuraś (POL)	68.54	~~85.0~~	85.0	~~90.0~~	24	107.5	~~112.5~~	~~112.5~~	21	192.5
23	Marlène Gudin (FRA)	68.51	85.0	87.5	~~90.0~~	20	100.0	102.5	~~105.0~~	25	190.0
24	Ruth Rivera (PUR)	67.68	80.0	85.0	~~87.5~~	23	100.0	105.0	~~110.0~~	23	190.0
25	Simone Ingram (AUS)	68.71	75.0	~~80.0~~	80.0	27	100.0	~~105.0~~	~~105.0~~	28	180.0
26	María Eugenia Villamizar (COL)	67.86	~~77.5~~	77.5	80.0	26	95.0	97.5	~~100.0~~	30	177.5
27	Lessya Karasseva (KAZ)	65.94	70.0	75.0	77.5	28	90.0	95.0	97.5	29	175.0
28	Valida Iskanderova (KAZ)	67.98	70.0	~~75.0~~	75.0	29	95.0	100.0	~~102.5~~	27	175.0
29	Tina Beiter (DEN)	68.05	72.5	~~77.5~~	~~77.5~~	31	~~97.5~~	97.5	~~102.5~~	31	170.0
30	Carolina Hernández (MEX)	68.34	~~72.5~~	72.5	75.0	30	90.0	~~95.0~~	~~95.0~~	32	165.0
31	Meital Moshkovitz (ISR)	67.18	~~50.0~~	50.0	55.0	32	~~62.5~~	62.5	67.5	33	122.5
32	Mariet Spronk (NED)	68.48	50.0	55.0	~~60.0~~	33	60.0	~~65.0~~	~~65.0~~	34	115.0
—	Neelam Setti Laxmi (IND)	68.09	100.0	~~105.0~~	~~105.0~~	7	~~125.0~~	~~125.0~~	~~125.0~~	—	—
—	Huang Shih-chun (TPE)	68.43	~~105.0~~	~~105.0~~	~~105.0~~	—	120.0	~~130.0~~	~~130.0~~	12	—
—	Filippia Kochliaridou (GRE)	68.29	~~90.0~~	~~90.0~~	~~90.0~~	—	~~107.5~~	107.5	~~112.5~~	20	—
—	Manuela Torazza (ITA)	67.82	~~85.0~~	~~85.0~~	~~85.0~~	—	—	—	—	—	—

== New records ==
Clean & Jerk	143.0 kg	Sun Tianni (CHN)	WR
