= 2000 Asian Weightlifting Championships =

International weightlifting competition

The 2000 Asian Weightlifting Championships were held in Osaka, Japan between May 3 and May 6, 2000. It was the 32nd men's and 13th women's championship. The event was organised by the Asian Weightlifting Federation.

== Medal summary ==
=== Men ===
Event	Gold		Silver		Bronze	
56 kg
Snatch	Zhang Xiangxiang; China	127.5 kg	Wang Shin-yuan; Chinese Taipei	125.0 kg	Yang Chin-yi; Chinese Taipei	122.5 kg
Clean & Jerk	Wang Shin-yuan; Chinese Taipei	160.0 kg	Yang Chin-yi; Chinese Taipei	155.0 kg	Zhang Xiangxiang; China	155.0 kg
Total	Wang Shin-yuan; Chinese Taipei	285.0 kg	Zhang Xiangxiang; China	282.5 kg	Yang Chin-yi; Chinese Taipei	277.5 kg
62 kg
Snatch	Shi Zhiyong; China	152.5 kg WR	Le Maosheng; China	140.0 kg	Im Yong-su; North Korea	125.0 kg
Clean & Jerk	Le Maosheng; China	170.0 kg	Shi Zhiyong; China	170.0 kg	Im Yong-su; North Korea	165.0 kg
Total	Shi Zhiyong; China	322.5 kg AR	Le Maosheng; China	310.0 kg	Im Yong-su; North Korea	290.0 kg
69 kg
Snatch	Wan Jianhui; China	155.0 kg	Zhang Guozheng; China	150.0 kg	Fadel Nasser Sarouf; Qatar	145.0 kg
Clean & Jerk	Lee Bae-young; South Korea	185.0 kg	Kim Hak-bong; South Korea	182.5 kg	Zhang Guozheng; China	182.5 kg
Total	Wan Jianhui; China	337.5 kg	Kim Hak-bong; South Korea	327.5 kg	Lee Bae-young; South Korea	327.5 kg
77 kg
Snatch	Sergey Filimonov; Kazakhstan	165.0 kg	Zhan Xugang; China	165.0 kg	Badr Salem Nayef; Qatar	162.5 kg
Clean & Jerk	Zhan Xugang; China	200.0 kg	Sergey Filimonov; Kazakhstan	197.5 kg	Badr Salem Nayef; Qatar	195.0 kg
Total	Zhan Xugang; China	365.0 kg	Sergey Filimonov; Kazakhstan	362.5 kg	Badr Salem Nayef; Qatar	357.5 kg
85 kg
Snatch	Mital Sharipov; Kyrgyzstan	155.0 kg	Bakhtiyor Nurullaev; Uzbekistan	155.0 kg	Kuanysh Rymkulov; Kazakhstan	155.0 kg
Clean & Jerk	Mital Sharipov; Kyrgyzstan	195.0 kg	Pavel Samoilov; Kazakhstan	192.5 kg	Kazumi Suzuki; Japan	190.0 kg
Total	Mital Sharipov; Kyrgyzstan	350.0 kg	Pavel Samoilov; Kazakhstan	345.0 kg	Kazumi Suzuki; Japan	340.0 kg
94 kg
Snatch	Slavik Nyu; Kazakhstan	175.0 kg	Andrey Makarov; Kazakhstan	175.0 kg	Fadel Mohamed Yousif; Qatar	170.0 kg
Clean & Jerk	Fadel Mohamed Yousif; Qatar	210.0 kg	Slavik Nyu; Kazakhstan	202.5 kg	Fazilbek Urazimbetov; Uzbekistan	200.0 kg
Total	Fadel Mohamed Yousif; Qatar	380.0 kg	Slavik Nyu; Kazakhstan	377.5 kg	Andrey Makarov; Kazakhstan	367.5 kg
105 kg
Snatch	Choi Jong-kun; South Korea	185.0 kg	Cui Wenhua; China	182.5 kg	Sergey Kopytov; Kazakhstan	180.0 kg
Clean & Jerk	Said Saif Asaad; Qatar	227.5 kg	Sergey Kopytov; Kazakhstan	220.0 kg	Choi Jong-kun; South Korea	220.0 kg
Total	Said Saif Asaad; Qatar	407.5 kg	Choi Jong-kun; South Korea	405.0 kg	Sergey Kopytov; Kazakhstan	400.0 kg
+105 kg
Snatch	Igor Khalilov; Uzbekistan	190.0 kg	Lee Woo-sung; South Korea	167.5 kg	Takanobu Iwasaki; Japan	155.0 kg
Clean & Jerk	Igor Khalilov; Uzbekistan	232.5 kg	Takanobu Iwasaki; Japan	215.0 kg	Ma Chan-hung; Chinese Taipei	192.5 kg
Total	Igor Khalilov; Uzbekistan	422.5 kg	Takanobu Iwasaki; Japan	370.0 kg	Ma Chan-hung; Chinese Taipei	342.5 kg

=== Women ===
Event	Gold		Silver		Bronze	
48 kg
Snatch	Kaori Niyanagi; Japan	80.0 kg	Kunjarani Devi; India	75.0 kg	Udomporn Polsak; Thailand	72.5 kg
Clean & Jerk	Kunjarani Devi; India	107.5 kg	Kaori Niyanagi; Japan	105.0 kg	Udomporn Polsak; Thailand	92.5 kg
Total	Kaori Niyanagi; Japan	185.0 kg	Kunjarani Devi; India	182.5 kg	Udomporn Polsak; Thailand	165.0 kg
53 kg
Snatch	Sanamacha Chanu; India	87.5 kg	Taengmo Muangpho; Thailand	85.0 kg	Li Zhuo; China	82.5 kg
Clean & Jerk	Sanamacha Chanu; India	110.0 kg	Li Zhuo; China	105.0 kg	Mari Nakaga; Japan	105.0 kg
Total	Sanamacha Chanu; India	197.5 kg	Li Zhuo; China	187.5 kg	Mari Nakaga; Japan	187.5 kg
58 kg
Snatch	Ri Song-hui; North Korea	100.0 kg	Yang Xia; China	95.0 kg	Khassaraporn Suta; Thailand	90.0 kg
Clean & Jerk	Ri Song-hui; North Korea	131.5 kg WR	Khassaraporn Suta; Thailand	122.5 kg	Yang Xia; China	120.0 kg
Total	Ri Song-hui; North Korea	230.0 kg	Yang Xia; China	215.0 kg	Khassaraporn Suta; Thailand	212.5 kg
63 kg
Snatch	Karnam Malleswari; India	105.0 kg	Saipin Detsaeng; Thailand	102.5 kg	Chen Yanqing; China	100.0 kg
Clean & Jerk	Chen Yanqing; China	130.0 kg	Saipin Detsaeng; Thailand	125.0 kg	Karnam Malleswari; India	120.0 kg
Total	Chen Yanqing; China	230.0 kg	Saipin Detsaeng; Thailand	227.5 kg	Karnam Malleswari; India	225.0 kg
69 kg
Snatch	Chen Xiaomin; China	107.5 kg	Pawina Thongsuk; Thailand	100.0 kg	Aphinya Pharksupho; Thailand	95.0 kg
Clean & Jerk	Aphinya Pharksupho; Thailand	130.0 kg	Chen Xiaomin; China	127.5 kg	Khoni Devi; India	115.0 kg
Total	Chen Xiaomin; China	235.0 kg	Aphinya Pharksupho; Thailand	225.0 kg	Shi Sun-hee; South Korea	205.0 kg
75 kg
Snatch	Sun Tianni; China	115.0 kg	Kim Soon-hee; South Korea	110.0 kg	Tatyana Khromova; Kazakhstan	107.5 kg
Clean & Jerk	Sun Tianni; China	142.5 kg WR	Tatyana Khromova; Kazakhstan	132.5 kg	Kim Soon-hee; South Korea	130.0 kg
Total	Sun Tianni; China	257.5 kg WR	Kim Soon-hee; South Korea	240.0 kg	Tatyana Khromova; Kazakhstan	240.0 kg
+75 kg
Snatch	Ding Meiyuan; China	125.0 kg	Chen Hsiao-lien; Chinese Taipei	115.0 kg	Moon Kyung-ae; South Korea	112.5 kg
Clean & Jerk	Ding Meiyuan; China	160.5 kg WR	Chen Hsiao-lien; Chinese Taipei	142.5 kg	Tang Weifang; China	140.0 kg
Total	Ding Meiyuan; China	285.0 kg	Chen Hsiao-lien; Chinese Taipei	257.5 kg	Tang Weifang; China	250.0 kg

== Medal table ==
Ranking by Big (Total result) medals

Rank	Nation	Gold	Silver	Bronze	Total
1	China	7	4	1	12
2	Qatar	2	0	1	3
3	Chinese Taipei	1	1	2	4
3	Japan	1	1	2	4
5	India	1	1	1	3
6	North Korea	1	0	1	2
7	Kyrgyzstan	1	0	0	1
7	Uzbekistan	1	0	0	1
9	Kazakhstan	0	3	3	6
10	South Korea	0	3	2	5
11	Thailand	0	2	2	4
Totals (11 entries)		15	15	15	45

Ranking by all medals: Big (Total result) and Small (Snatch and Clean & Jerk)

Rank	Nation	Gold	Silver	Bronze	Total
1	China	18	12	7	37
2	India	5	2	3	10
3	Qatar	4	0	5	9
4	Uzbekistan	3	1	1	5
5	North Korea	3	0	3	6
6	Kyrgyzstan	3	0	0	3
7	Kazakhstan	2	9	6	17
8	South Korea	2	6	5	13
9	Chinese Taipei	2	5	4	11
10	Japan	2	3	5	10
11	Thailand	1	7	6	14
Totals (11 entries)		45	45	45	135

== Participating nations ==
135 athletes from 17 nations competed.

- China (15)
- Chinese Taipei (15)
- India (13)
- Japan (14)
- Kazakhstan (15)
- Kuwait (3)
- Kyrgyzstan (5)
- Mongolia (1)
- North Korea (3)
- Pakistan (3)
- Philippines (2)
- Qatar (6)
- South Korea (14)
- Thailand (10)
- Turkmenistan (5)
- Uzbekistan (8)
- Vietnam (3)
