= 1997 World Weightlifting Championships – Women's 70 kg =

The 1997 World Weightlifting Championships were held in Chiang Mai, Thailand from December 6 to December 14. The women's competition in the 70 kg division was staged on 11 December 1997.

== Medalists ==
Event	Gold		Silver		Bronze	
Snatch	Xiang Fenglan (CHN)	105.0 kg	Ilona Dankó (HUN)	100.0 kg	Huang Hsi-li (TPE)	97.5 kg
Clean & Jerk	Xiang Fenglan (CHN)	130.0 kg	Irina Kasimova (RUS)	122.5 kg	Huang Hsi-li (TPE)	120.0 kg
Total	Xiang Fenglan (CHN)	235.0 kg	Huang Hsi-li (TPE)	217.5 kg	Ilona Dankó (HUN)	215.0 kg

== Records ==
Prior to this competition, the existing world records were as follows.

World record	Snatch	105.0 kg
World record	Clean & Jerk	130.0 kg
World record	Total	232.5 kg

== Results ==
Rank	Athlete	Body weight	Snatch (kg)				Clean & Jerk (kg)				Total
Rank	Athlete	Body weight	1	2	3	Rank	1	2	3	Rank	Total
1st place, gold medalist(s)	Xiang Fenglan (CHN)	69.20	100.0	105.5	—	1st place, gold medalist(s)	127.5	130.5	—	1st place, gold medalist(s)	235.0
2nd place, silver medalist(s)	Huang Hsi-li (TPE)	66.85	~~95.0~~	95.0	97.5	3rd place, bronze medalist(s)	117.5	120.0	~~122.5~~	3rd place, bronze medalist(s)	217.5
3rd place, bronze medalist(s)	Ilona Dankó (HUN)	69.60	95.0	97.5	100.0	2nd place, silver medalist(s)	~~115.0~~	115.0	~~120.0~~	7	215.0
4	Irina Kasimova (RUS)	67.30	~~90.0~~	~~90.0~~	90.0	7	120.0	122.5	~~127.5~~	2nd place, silver medalist(s)	212.5
5	Win Win Maw (MYA)	68.55	92.5	~~95.0~~	~~95.0~~	5	120.0	~~125.0~~	~~125.0~~	4	212.5
6	Jong Myong-hui (PRK)	69.20	92.5	97.5	~~100.0~~	4	115.0	~~120.0~~	~~120.0~~	6	212.5
7	Kumi Haseba (JPN)	69.65	87.5	~~92.5~~	~~92.5~~	9	112.5	~~115.0~~	115.0	8	202.5
8	Julie Malenfant (CAN)	67.30	~~87.5~~	~~87.5~~	90.0	6	105.0	~~110.0~~	110.0	9	200.0
9	Park Mi-jung (KOR)	69.00	85.0	~~90.0~~	~~90.0~~	10	110.0	115.0	~~120.0~~	5	200.0
10	Tamara Perova (RUS)	67.75	82.5	87.5	~~90.0~~	8	102.5	105.0	107.5	13	195.0
11	Nagwan El-Zawawi (EGY)	68.15	~~77.5~~	80.0	82.5	11	~~105.0~~	105.0	110.0	10	192.5
12	Anastasia Tsakiri (GRE)	65.95	77.5	~~82.5~~	~~82.5~~	13	92.5	97.5	102.5	14	180.0
13	Şule Şahbaz (TUR)	68.85	~~77.5~~	77.5	82.5	12	90.0	95.0	~~97.5~~	15	177.5
—	Sharon Oakley (GBR)	67.60	~~85.0~~	~~85.0~~	~~85.0~~	—	100.0	105.0	107.5	13	—
—	Maria Tatsi (GRE)	69.00	~~82.5~~	~~82.5~~	~~82.5~~	—	100.0	~~115.0~~	~~115.0~~	11	—

== New records ==
Snatch	105.5 kg	Xiang Fenglan (CHN)	WR
Clean & Jerk	130.5 kg	Xiang Fenglan (CHN)	WR
Total	235.0 kg	Xiang Fenglan (CHN)	WR
