= 1999 World Weightlifting Championships – Women's 53 kg =

The women's featherweight event (53 kilograms) is the second women's weight class event at the weightlifting competition, limited to competitors with a maximum of 53 kilograms of body mass. The competition at the 1999 World Weightlifting Championships took place in Athens, Greece on November 21, 1999.

Each lifter performed in both the snatch and clean and jerk lifts, with the final score being the sum of the lifter's best result in each. The athlete received three attempts in each of the two lifts; the score for the lift was the heaviest weight successfully lifted.

== Medalists ==
| Event | Gold | | Silver | | Bronze | |
|---|---|---|---|---|---|---|
| Snatch | Li Feng-ying (TPE) | 95.0 kg | Winarni Binti Slamet (INA) | 90.0 kg | Swe Swe Win (MYA) | 85.0 kg |
| Clean & Jerk | Li Feng-ying (TPE) | 120.0 kg | Winarni Binti Slamet (INA) | 112.5 kg | Wang Xiufen (CHN) | 112.5 kg |
| Total | Li Feng-ying (TPE) | 215.0 kg | Winarni Binti Slamet (INA) | 202.5 kg | Wang Xiufen (CHN) | 197.5 kg |

== Records ==
Prior to this competition, the existing world records were as follows.

| World Record | Snatch | Meng Xianjuan (CHN) | 97.5 kg | Chiba, Japan | 1 May 1999 |
| World Record | Clean & Jerk | Li Feng-ying (TPE) | 121.0 kg | Wuhan, China | 30 August 1999 |
| World Record | Total | Meng Xianjuan (CHN) | 217.5 kg | Chiba, Japan | 1 May 1999 |

== Results ==
| Rank | Athlete | Body weight | Snatch (kg) | | | | Clean & Jerk (kg) | | | | Total |
| Rank | Athlete | Body weight | 1 | 2 | 3 | Rank | 1 | 2 | 3 | Rank | Total |
|---|---|---|---|---|---|---|---|---|---|---|---|
| 1st place, gold medalist(s) | Li Feng-ying (TPE) | 52.66 | 90.0 | 92.5 | 95.0 | 1st place, gold medalist(s) | 115.0 | ~~121.5~~ | 121.5 | 1st place, gold medalist(s) | 215.0 |
| 2nd place, silver medalist(s) | Winarni Binti Slamet (INA) | 52.14 | 85.0 | 87.5 | 90.0 | 2nd place, silver medalist(s) | 105.0 | 110.0 | 112.5 | 2nd place, silver medalist(s) | 202.5 |
| 3rd place, bronze medalist(s) | Wang Xiufen (CHN) | 52.93 | ~~85.0~~ | 85.0 | ~~90.0~~ | 8 | 110.0 | 112.5 | ~~117.5~~ | 3rd place, bronze medalist(s) | 197.5 |
| 4 | Supeni Wasiman (INA) | 52.89 | 85.0 | ~~90.0~~ | ~~90.0~~ | 7 | ~~110.0~~ | 110.0 | ~~112.5~~ | 5 | 195.0 |
| 5 | Mari Nakaga (JPN) | 52.85 | 80.0 | 82.5 | ~~85.0~~ | 10 | 105.0 | ~~110.0~~ | 110.0 | 4 | 192.5 |
| 6 | Swe Swe Win (MYA) | 51.55 | 80.0 | 85.0 | ~~87.5~~ | 3rd place, bronze medalist(s) | 105.0 | ~~110.0~~ | ~~110.0~~ | 6 | 190.0 |
| 7 | Franca Gbodo (NGR) | 52.55 | 80.0 | 85.0 | ~~87.5~~ | 5 | ~~105.0~~ | 105.0 | ~~110.0~~ | 7 | 190.0 |
| 8 | Robin Goad (USA) | 52.58 | 80.0 | 85.0 | ~~87.5~~ | 6 | 97.5 | 102.5 | ~~105.0~~ | 10 | 187.5 |
| 9 | Izabela Dragneva (BUL) | 52.28 | 82.5 | ~~87.5~~ | ~~87.5~~ | 9 | 102.5 | ~~107.5~~ | ~~107.5~~ | 9 | 185.0 |
| 10 | Taengmo Muangpho (THA) | 52.47 | 80.0 | ~~85.0~~ | 85.0 | 4 | 95.0 | 100.0 | ~~105.0~~ | 12 | 185.0 |
| 11 | Nandini Devi (IND) | 52.90 | 75.0 | 80.0 | ~~85.0~~ | 13 | 97.5 | 102.5 | ~~107.5~~ | 11 | 182.5 |
| 12 | Estefanía Juan (ESP) | 52.92 | 75.0 | ~~77.5~~ | ~~77.5~~ | 16 | 100.0 | 102.5 | 105.0 | 8 | 180.0 |
| 13 | Karla Fernández (VEN) | 52.80 | ~~80.0~~ | 80.0 | ~~82.5~~ | 11 | ~~97.5~~ | ~~97.5~~ | 97.5 | 14 | 177.5 |
| 14 | Noriko Hasegawa (JPN) | 52.36 | 72.5 | 75.0 | 77.5 | 14 | 92.5 | 97.5 | ~~100.0~~ | 13 | 175.0 |
| 15 | Siyka Stoeva (BUL) | 52.80 | 72.5 | 77.5 | 80.0 | 12 | 92.5 | ~~97.5~~ | ~~97.5~~ | 17 | 172.5 |
| 16 | Michal Shahar (ISR) | 52.85 | 77.5 | ~~82.5~~ | ~~82.5~~ | 15 | 92.5 | ~~95.0~~ | ~~95.0~~ | 18 | 170.0 |
| 17 | Adriana Gallego (COL) | 52.36 | ~~70.0~~ | ~~70.0~~ | 70.0 | 19 | 90.0 | ~~95.0~~ | 95.0 | 15 | 165.0 |
| 18 | Abigail Guerrero (ESP) | 52.94 | 70.0 | 75.0 | ~~77.5~~ | 17 | 85.0 | 90.0 | ~~92.5~~ | 20 | 165.0 |
| 19 | Silvia Puxeddu (ITA) | 52.47 | 67.5 | ~~72.5~~ | 72.5 | 18 | 90.0 | ~~95.0~~ | ~~95.0~~ | 19 | 162.5 |
| 20 | Bibiana Muñoz (COL) | 52.42 | 65.0 | ~~67.5~~ | ~~67.5~~ | 22 | ~~92.5~~ | 92.5 | 95.0 | 16 | 160.0 |
| 21 | Evdokia Chatziavramidou (GRE) | 52.49 | ~~67.5~~ | 67.5 | 70.0 | 20 | 85.0 | ~~90.0~~ | ~~90.0~~ | 21 | 155.0 |
| 22 | Lisbeth Østergaard (DEN) | 52.80 | 62.5 | 65.0 | ~~67.5~~ | 23 | 80.0 | 82.5 | 85.0 | 22 | 150.0 |
| 23 | Maria Elisabete Jorge (BRA) | 52.12 | 60.0 | ~~65.0~~ | 65.0 | 21 | 77.5 | ~~82.5~~ | 82.5 | 23 | 147.5 |
| 24 | Maria Monteiro (POR) | 52.13 | 60.0 | ~~62.5~~ | ~~62.5~~ | 25 | 75.0 | 80.0 | ~~82.5~~ | 24 | 140.0 |
| 25 | Maria Lagoa (POR) | 52.63 | ~~62.5~~ | 62.5 | ~~65.0~~ | 24 | 75.0 | ~~77.5~~ | 77.5 | 25 | 140.0 |
| 26 | Andrea Piková (SVK) | 52.88 | ~~52.5~~ | 52.5 | ~~55.0~~ | 26 | 67.5 | 72.5 | ~~75.0~~ | 26 | 125.0 |
| — | Maria Bohm (SWE) | 52.88 | ~~67.5~~ | ~~67.5~~ | ~~67.5~~ | — | — | — | — | — | — |

== New records ==
| Clean & Jerk | 121.5 kg | Li Feng-ying (TPE) | WR |
