= 1999 World Weightlifting Championships – Women's 75 kg =

Weightlifting competition in Greece

The Women's Heavyweight Weightlifting Event (75 kg) is the sixth women's weight class event at the weightlifting competition, limited to competitors with a maximum of 75 kilograms of body mass. The competition at the 1999 World Weightlifting Championships took place in Athens, Greece on November 26, 1999.

Each lifter performed in both the snatch and clean and jerk lifts, with the final score being the sum of the lifter's best result in each. The athlete received three attempts in each of the two lifts; the score for the lift was the heaviest weight successfully lifted.

== Medalists ==
Event	Gold		Silver		Bronze	
Snatch	Xu Jiao (CHN)	112.5 kg	Kim Soon-hee (KOR)	107.5 kg	Ruth Ogbeifo (NGR)	107.5 kg
Clean & Jerk	Kim Soon-hee (KOR)	135.0 kg	Xu Jiao (CHN)	135.0 kg	Ruth Ogbeifo (NGR)	132.5 kg
Total	Xu Jiao (CHN)	247.5 kg	Kim Soon-hee (KOR)	242.5 kg	Ruth Ogbeifo (NGR)	240.0 kg

== Records ==
Prior to this competition, the existing world records were as follows.

World Record	Snatch	Tang Weifang (CHN)	116.0 kg	Wuhan, China	3 September 1999
World Record	Clean & Jerk	Tang Weifang (CHN)	141.0 kg	Wuhan, China	3 September 1999
World Record	Total	Tang Weifang (CHN)	255.0 kg	Wuhan, China	3 September 1999

== Results ==
Rank	Athlete	Body weight	Snatch (kg)				Clean & Jerk (kg)				Total
Rank	Athlete	Body weight	1	2	3	Rank	1	2	3	Rank	Total
1st place, gold medalist(s)	Xu Jiao (CHN)	74.32	107.5	110.0	112.5	1st place, gold medalist(s)	130.0	135.0	~~137.5~~	2nd place, silver medalist(s)	247.5
2nd place, silver medalist(s)	Kim Soon-hee (KOR)	73.31	100.0	105.0	107.5	2nd place, silver medalist(s)	130.0	~~135.0~~	135.0	1st place, gold medalist(s)	242.5
3rd place, bronze medalist(s)	Ruth Ogbeifo (NGR)	74.61	102.5	107.5	~~110.0~~	3rd place, bronze medalist(s)	130.0	132.5	~~135.0~~	3rd place, bronze medalist(s)	240.0
4	Kuo Yi-hang (TPE)	74.63	102.5	~~107.5~~	~~107.5~~	7	132.5	~~137.5~~	~~137.5~~	4	235.0
5	Tatyana Khromova (KAZ)	74.98	100.0	105.0	~~107.5~~	4	120.0	125.0	130.0	5	235.0
6	Karoliina Lundahl (FIN)	74.87	102.5	~~107.5~~	~~107.5~~	8	125.0	~~130.0~~	~~130.0~~	9	227.5
7	Cara Heads (USA)	72.99	97.5	102.5	~~105.0~~	5	117.5	~~122.5~~	122.5	9	225.0
8	Aye Mon Khin (MYA)	75.00	~~102.5~~	~~102.5~~	102.5	9	~~122.5~~	122.5	~~130.0~~	12	225.0
9	Wanda Rijo (DOM)	74.02	92.5	~~97.5~~	97.5	11	120.0	125.0	~~130.0~~	7	222.5
10	Mónica Carrió (ESP)	74.03	100.0	102.5	~~105.0~~	6	115.0	120.0	~~122.5~~	14	222.5
11	Gyöngyi Likerecz (HUN)	74.77	95.0	100.0	~~102.5~~	10	120.0	122.5	~~125.0~~	11	222.5
12	Svetlana Khabirova (RUS)	71.32	95.0	~~100.0~~	~~100.0~~	15	115.0	120.0	125.0	6	220.0
13	Line Mary (FRA)	74.25	95.0	97.5	~~100.0~~	12	~~115.0~~	115.0	120.0	15	217.5
14	Theresa Brick (CAN)	74.93	92.5	~~97.5~~	97.5	14	112.5	117.5	120.0	16	217.5
15	Stephanie Mantek (GER)	71.68	92.5	95.0	~~97.5~~	16	115.0	120.0	~~122.5~~	13	215.0
16	Jeane Lassen (CAN)	74.08	87.5	92.5	~~95.0~~	18	117.5	~~122.5~~	122.5	10	215.0
17	Ilona Dankó (HUN)	74.65	97.5	~~102.5~~	~~102.5~~	13	112.5	117.5	~~122.5~~	17	215.0
18	Theano Zagkliveri (GRE)	74.06	85.0	~~90.0~~	90.0	20	105.0	~~110.0~~	110.0	19	200.0
19	Romi Devi (IND)	74.63	~~85.0~~	85.0	90.0	21	105.0	110.0	~~115.0~~	20	200.0
20	Caroline Pileggi (AUS)	74.94	85.0	~~90.0~~	~~90.0~~	23	110.0	~~115.0~~	~~115.0~~	22	195.0
21	Iwona Mikołajczewska (POL)	73.75	85.0	90.0	~~92.5~~	19	100.0	~~105.0~~	~~105.0~~	28	190.0
22	Anja Moldenhauer (GER)	72.95	80.0	~~85.0~~	85.0	22	102.5	~~107.5~~	~~107.5~~	25	187.5
23	Amanda Phillips (AUS)	69.81	77.5	~~80.0~~	80.0	24	100.0	~~105.0~~	105.0	23	185.0
24	Beate Amdahl (NOR)	73.55	~~75.0~~	77.5	80.0	25	105.0	~~110.0~~	~~110.0~~	24	185.0
25	Cinthya Domínguez (MEX)	73.69	~~80.0~~	80.0	~~85.0~~	26	100.0	~~105.0~~	~~105.0~~	27	180.0
26	Zuzana Kováčová (SVK)	72.35	77.5	~~82.5~~	~~82.5~~	27	100.0	~~105.0~~	~~105.0~~	26	177.5
27	Kineret Vainstein (ISR)	70.25	60.0	65.0	~~70.0~~	28	67.5	72.5	~~77.5~~	29	137.5
—	Oksana Sukhoruk (UKR)	73.81	~~95.0~~	~~95.0~~	95.0	17	~~120.0~~	~~120.0~~	~~120.0~~	—	—
—	Mylona Kleanthi (GRE)	71.38	~~80.0~~	~~80.0~~	~~80.0~~	—	105.0	100.0	115.0	18	—
—	Mihaela Geambașu (ROM)	74.89	~~100.0~~	~~100.0~~	~~100.0~~	—	110.0	~~120.0~~	~~120.0~~	21	—
DQ	Michele David (MRI)	74.81	75.0	77.5	~~80.0~~	—	95.0	97.5	100.0	—	—
