= Weightlifting at the 1998 Asian Games – Women's 75 kg =

Women's 75 kg at the 1998 Asian Games
- Venue: Thunder Dome
- Date: 12 December 1998
- Competitors: 9 from 9 nations

Medalists
gold medal	Wei Xiangying	China
silver medal	Kim Soon-hee	South Korea
bronze medal	Aye Mon Khin	Myanmar

The women's 75 kilograms event at the 1998 Asian Games took place on 12 December 1998 at Thunder Dome, Maung Thong Thani Sports Complex.

The weightlifter from China won the gold, with a combined lift of 242.5 kg.

Total score was the sum of the lifter's best result in each of the snatch and the clean and jerk, with three lifts allowed for each lift. In case of a tie, the lighter lifter won; if still tied, the lifter who took the fewest attempts to achieve the total score won. Lifters without a valid snatch score were allowed to perform the clean and jerk.

== Results ==
Rank	Athlete	Body weight	Snatch (kg)				Clean & Jerk (kg)				Total
Rank	Athlete	Body weight	1	2	3	Result	1	2	3	Result	Total
1st place, gold medalist(s)	Wei Xiangying (CHN)	73.85	107.5	112.5	115.0	115.0	122.5	~~127.5~~	127.5	127.5	242.5
2nd place, silver medalist(s)	Kim Soon-hee (KOR)	74.15	95.0	100.0	102.5	102.5	122.5	127.5	~~145.0~~	127.5	230.0
3rd place, bronze medalist(s)	Aye Mon Khin (MYA)	74.80	100.0	~~105.0~~	~~105.0~~	100.0	125.0	~~130.0~~	130.0	130.0	230.0
4	Kuo Shu-fen (TPE)	74.25	95.0	100.0	~~102.5~~	100.0	125.0	~~130.0~~	~~130.0~~	125.0	225.0
5	Ok Son-hui (PRK)	71.30	92.5	97.5	~~100.0~~	97.5	120.0	~~125.0~~	~~125.0~~	120.0	217.5
6	Aphinya Pharksupho (THA)	69.20	~~90.0~~	92.5	~~97.5~~	92.5	115.0	122.5	~~127.5~~	122.5	215.0
7	Tatyana Khromova (KAZ)	74.25	90.0	95.0	~~100.0~~	95.0	115.0	~~120.0~~	~~120.0~~	115.0	210.0
8	Hiromi Fujiwara (JPN)	74.30	~~90.0~~	90.0	95.0	95.0	110.0	~~115.0~~	~~115.0~~	110.0	205.0
9	Ujwala Mane (IND)	73.10	~~90.0~~	90.0	92.5	92.5	~~107.5~~	107.5	~~112.5~~	107.5	200.0

== New records ==
The following records were established during the competition.

Snatch	112.5	Wei Xiangying (CHN)	WR
Snatch	115.0	Wei Xiangying (CHN)	WR
