= Abbasov =

Abbasov (Azerbaijani: Abbasov, Russian: Аббасов) is a masculine surname, commonly found in Azerbaijani-language. The female counterpart name is Abbasova. It is a slavicised version of Arabic male given name Abbas with addition of the suffix -ov. People with this surname include:

- Ali Abbasov (born 1953), Minister of Information and Communication Technology, Azerbaijan
- Ashraf Abbasov (1920–1992), Azerbaijani composer
- Aykhan Abbasov, Azerbaijani footballer
- Azat Abbasov (1925–2006), operatic tenor
- Farid Abbasov, Azerbaijani chess grandmaster
- Idrak Abbasov (born c. 1976), Azerbaijani journalist
- Ismat Abbasov, Minister of Agriculture, Azerbaijan
- Mahyaddin Abbasov, Azerbaijani journalist
- Ramazan Abbasov, Azerbaijani footballer
- Ruslan Abbasov, Azerbaijani sprint athlete
- Samir Abbasov, Azerbaijani footballer
- Tamilla Abbasova (born 1982), Russian racing cyclist
- Tarana Abbasova (born 1967), Azerbaijani female weightlifter
- Tural Abbasov (born 1990), Azerbaijani swimmer
- Urfan Abbasov (born 1992), Azerbaijani footballer
