= Daniela Kerkelova =

Bulgarian weightlifter

Personal information
- Full name: Daniela Kerkelova
- Born: 8 November 1969 (age 56) Devin, Bulgaria
- Height: 163 cm (5 ft 4 in)
- Weight: 68.04 kg (150.0 lb)

Sport
- Country: Bulgaria
- Sport: Weightlifting
- Weight class: 69 kg
- Club: Smolyan, Smolyan
- Team: National team
- Updated on 28 September 2016

Daniela Kerkelova (original name: Даниела Керкелова, born 8 November 1969 in Devin) was a Bulgarian weightlifter, competing in the 69 kg category and representing Bulgaria at international competitions.

She participated at the 2000 Summer Olympics in the 69 kg event. She competed at world championships, most recently at the 1999 World Weightlifting Championships.

== Major results ==
Year	Venue	Weight	Snatch (kg)				Clean & Jerk (kg)				Total	Rank
Year	Venue	Weight	1	2	3	Rank	1	2	3	Rank	Total	Rank
Summer Olympics
2000	Sydney, Australia	69 kg				—N/a				—N/a		5
World Championships
1999	Piraeus, Greece	69 kg	90	~~95~~	95	12	115	120	~~125~~	10	215	10
1998	Lahti, Finland	69 kg	90	~~95~~	~~95~~	9	117.5	122.5	~~127.5~~	4	212.5	6
