= Karla Fernández =

Venezuelan weightlifter

Personal information
- Full name: Karla Fernandez Beaumont
- Born: 1 January 1977 (age 49)
- Height: 158 cm (5 ft 2 in)
- Weight: 53.00 kg (116.84 lb)

Sport
- Country: Venezuela
- Sport: Weightlifting
- Weight class: 53 kg
- Team: National team
- Updated on 13 September 2016

Karla Fernandez Beaumont (born 1 January 1977) was a Venezuelan female weightlifter, competing in the 53 kg category and representing Venezuela at international competitions.

She participated at the 2000 Summer Olympics in the 53 kg event. She competed at world championships, most recently at the 2003 World Weightlifting Championships.

== Major results ==
Year	Venue	Weight	Snatch (kg)				Clean & Jerk (kg)				Total	Rank
Year	Venue	Weight	1	2	3	Rank	1	2	3	Rank	Total	Rank
Summer Olympics
2000	Sydney, Australia	53 kg				—N/a				—N/a		9
World Championships
2003	Vancouver, Canada	53 kg	75	~~80~~	~~80~~	19	~~90~~	~~90~~	~~90~~	---	0	---
1999	Piraeus, Greece	53 kg	~~80~~	80	~~82.5~~	11	~~97.5~~	~~97.5~~	97.5	14	177.5	13
