= 1997 World Weightlifting Championships – Women's 76 kg =

The 1997 World Weightlifting Championships were held in Chiang Mai, Thailand from December 6 to December 14. The women's competition in the 76 kg division was staged on 12 December 1997.

== Medalists ==
| Event | Gold | | Silver | | Bronze | |
|---|---|---|---|---|---|---|
| Snatch | Hua Ju (CHN) | 107.5 kg | Mária Takács (HUN) | 100.0 kg | Mónica Carrió (ESP) | 97.5 kg |
| Clean & Jerk | Hua Ju (CHN) | 140.0 kg | Kim Soon-hee (KOR) | 125.0 kg | Mária Takács (HUN) | 125.0 kg |
| Total | Hua Ju (CHN) | 247.5 kg | Mária Takács (HUN) | 225.0 kg | Kim Soon-hee (KOR) | 220.0 kg |

== Records ==
Prior to this competition, the existing world records were as follows.

| World Record | Snatch | Gao Xiaoyan (CHN) | 106.5 kg | Seoul, South Korea | 24 November 1996 |
| World Record | Clean & Jerk | Zhang Guimei (CHN) | 140.0 kg | Shilong, China | 18 December 1993 |
| World Record | Total | Zhang Guimei (CHN) | 235.0 kg | Shilong, China | 18 December 1993 |

== Results ==
| Rank | Athlete | Body weight | Snatch (kg) | | | | Clean & Jerk (kg) | | | | Total |
| Rank | Athlete | Body weight | 1 | 2 | 3 | Rank | 1 | 2 | 3 | Rank | Total |
|---|---|---|---|---|---|---|---|---|---|---|---|
| 1st place, gold medalist(s) | Hua Ju (CHN) | 70.50 | ~~102.5~~ | 102.5 | 107.5 | 1st place, gold medalist(s) | 130.0 | 140.5 | — | 1st place, gold medalist(s) | 247.5 |
| 2nd place, silver medalist(s) | Mária Takács (HUN) | 74.05 | 95.0 | 97.5 | 100.0 | 2nd place, silver medalist(s) | 120.0 | 122.5 | 125.0 | 3rd place, bronze medalist(s) | 225.0 |
| 3rd place, bronze medalist(s) | Kim Soon-hee (KOR) | 74.00 | 90.0 | 95.0 | ~~97.5~~ | 5 | 115.0 | 122.5 | 125.0 | 2nd place, silver medalist(s) | 220.0 |
| 4 | Ok Son-hui (PRK) | 71.45 | 92.5 | 97.5 | ~~100.0~~ | 4 | 117.5 | ~~122.5~~ | ~~125.0~~ | 6 | 215.0 |
| 5 | Sumita Laha (IND) | 74.40 | 90.0 | ~~92.5~~ | ~~92.5~~ | 10 | 115.0 | 117.5 | 120.0 | 5 | 210.0 |
| 6 | Line Mary (FRA) | 75.30 | 92.5 | ~~97.5~~ | ~~97.5~~ | 8 | 112.5 | 115.0 | 117.5 | 8 | 210.0 |
| 7 | Bharti Singh (IND) | 75.90 | 90.0 | 95.0 | ~~97.5~~ | 7 | 107.5 | ~~112.5~~ | 112.5 | 10 | 207.5 |
| 8 | Mónica Carrió (ESP) | 71.35 | 92.5 | 95.0 | 97.5 | 3rd place, bronze medalist(s) | 107.5 | ~~110.0~~ | ~~110.0~~ | 11 | 205.0 |
| 9 | Jeane Lassen (CAN) | 73.60 | 80.0 | 85.0 | ~~90.0~~ | 12 | 110.0 | 115.0 | 117.5 | 7 | 202.5 |
| 10 | Hiromi Fujiwara (JPN) | 74.20 | ~~87.5~~ | 87.5 | ~~92.5~~ | 11 | 107.5 | 112.5 | 115.0 | 9 | 202.5 |
| 11 | Manuela Torazza (ITA) | 74.05 | 85.0 | ~~90.0~~ | 90.0 | 9 | 105.0 | ~~110.0~~ | ~~110.0~~ | 12 | 195.0 |
| — | Lu Yu-ruu (TPE) | 75.75 | ~~95.0~~ | 95.0 | ~~100.0~~ | 6 | ~~120.0~~ | ~~120.0~~ | ~~120.0~~ | — | — |
| — | Cho Cho Win (MYA) | 74.85 | ~~90.0~~ | ~~90.0~~ | ~~90.0~~ | — | 115.0 | 120.0 | 125.0 | 4 | — |
| DQ | Aysel Özgür (TUR) | 75.65 | 105.0 | 110.0 | ~~112.5~~ | — | 125.0 | ~~130.0~~ | ~~130.0~~ | — | — |
| DQ | Sefi Onubaye (NGR) | 74.80 | ~~90.0~~ | 90.0 | ~~95.0~~ | — | 110.0 | 115.0 | ~~120.0~~ | — | — |
| DQ | Lubov Grigurko (UKR) | 75.20 | 90.0 | 95.0 | ~~97.5~~ | — | 105.0 | ~~110.0~~ | ~~110.0~~ | — | — |

== New records ==
| Snatch | 107.5 kg | Hua Ju (CHN) | WR |
| Snatch | ~~110.0 kg~~ | ~~Aysel Özgür (TUR)~~ | ~~WR~~ |
| Clean & Jerk | 140.5 kg | Hua Ju (CHN) | WR |
| Total | 237.5 kg | Hua Ju (CHN) | WR |
| Total | 247.5 kg | Hua Ju (CHN) | WR |
