= Weightlifting at the 2000 Summer Olympics – Women's 75 kg =

Weightlifting at the Olympics

Women's 75 kg at the Games of the XXVII Olympiad
- Venue: Sydney Convention and Exhibition Centre
- Date: 20 September 2000
- Competitors: 11 from 11 nations

Medalists
| 1st place, gold medalist(s) | | María Isabel Urrutia | Colombia |
| 2nd place, silver medalist(s) | | Ruth Ogbeifo | Nigeria |
| 3rd place, bronze medalist(s) | | Kuo Yi-hang | Chinese Taipei |

The women's 75 kilograms weightlifting event at the 2000 Summer Olympics in Sydney, Australia took place at the Sydney Convention and Exhibition Centre on September 20.

Total score was the sum of the lifter's best result in each of the snatch and the clean and jerk, with three lifts allowed for each lift. In case of a tie, the lighter lifter won; if still tied, the lifter who took the fewest attempts to achieve the total score won. Lifters without a valid snatch score did not perform the clean and jerk.

== Schedule ==
All times are Australian Eastern Time (UTC+10:00)

| Date | Time | Event |
|---|---|---|
| 20 September 2000 | 14:30 | Group A |

== Records ==
Prior to this competition, the existing world and Olympic records were as follows.

| World Record | Snatch | Tang Weifang (CHN) | 116.0 kg | Wuhan, China | 3 September 1999 |
| World Record | Clean & Jerk | Sun Tianni (CHN) | 142.5 kg | Osaka, Japan | 6 May 2000 |
| World Record | Total | Sun Tianni (CHN) | 257.5 kg | Osaka, Japan | 6 May 2000 |
| Olympic Record | Snatch | Olympic Standard | 115.0 kg | — | 1 January 1997 |
| Olympic Record | Clean & Jerk | Olympic Standard | 142.5 kg | — | 1 January 1997 |
| Olympic Record | Total | Olympic Standard | 257.5 kg | — | 1 January 1997 |

== Results ==
| Rank | Athlete | Group | Body weight | Snatch (kg) | | | | Clean & Jerk (kg) | | | | Total |
| Rank | Athlete | Group | Body weight | 1 | 2 | 3 | Result | 1 | 2 | 3 | Result | Total |
|---|---|---|---|---|---|---|---|---|---|---|---|---|
| 1st place, gold medalist(s) | María Isabel Urrutia (COL) | A | 73.28 | 105.0 | ~~110.0~~ | 110.0 | 110.0 | 132.5 | 135.0 | ~~137.5~~ | 135.0 | 245.0 |
| 2nd place, silver medalist(s) | Ruth Ogbeifo (NGR) | A | 74.20 | 105.0 | ~~110.0~~ | ~~110.0~~ | 105.0 | 135.0 | 140.0 | ~~142.5~~ | 140.0 | 245.0 |
| 3rd place, bronze medalist(s) | Kuo Yi-hang (TPE) | A | 74.52 | 105.0 | 107.5 | ~~110.0~~ | 107.5 | 135.0 | 137.5 | ~~140.0~~ | 137.5 | 245.0 |
| 4 | Kim Soon-hee (KOR) | A | 73.84 | 105.0 | ~~110.0~~ | ~~110.0~~ | 105.0 | 135.0 | ~~137.5~~ | ~~140.0~~ | 135.0 | 240.0 |
| 5 | Gyöngyi Likerecz (HUN) | A | 74.16 | 102.5 | 105.0 | ~~107.5~~ | 105.0 | 122.5 | ~~125.0~~ | ~~125.0~~ | 122.5 | 227.5 |
| 6 | Svetlana Khabirova (RUS) | A | 74.38 | 102.5 | ~~107.5~~ | ~~107.5~~ | 102.5 | 125.0 | ~~132.5~~ | ~~132.5~~ | 125.0 | 227.5 |
| 7 | Cara Heads (USA) | A | 72.64 | ~~102.5~~ | ~~102.5~~ | 102.5 | 102.5 | 120.0 | ~~125.0~~ | ~~125.0~~ | 120.0 | 222.5 |
| 8 | Wanda Rijo (DOM) | A | 73.74 | 90.0 | 95.0 | ~~100.0~~ | 95.0 | ~~120.0~~ | ~~120.0~~ | 120.0 | 120.0 | 215.0 |
| 9 | Mónica Carrió (ESP) | A | 74.18 | 92.5 | ~~95.0~~ | 95.0 | 95.0 | ~~110.0~~ | 110.0 | ~~115.0~~ | 110.0 | 205.0 |
| — | Karoliina Lundahl (FIN) | A | 74.36 | ~~102.5~~ | ~~102.5~~ | ~~102.5~~ | — | — | — | — | — | — |
| — | Tatyana Khromova (KAZ) | A | 74.68 | 105.0 | 110.0 | ~~112.5~~ | 110.0 | ~~132.5~~ | ~~132.5~~ | ~~132.5~~ | — | — |
