= Weightlifting at the 2000 Summer Olympics – Women's 53 kg =

Weightlifting at the Olympics

Women's 53 kg at the Games of the XXVII Olympiad
- Venue: Sydney Convention and Exhibition Centre
- Date: 18 September 2000
- Competitors: 10 from 10 nations

Medalists
1st place, gold medalist(s)		Yang Xia	China
2nd place, silver medalist(s)		Li Feng-ying	Chinese Taipei
3rd place, bronze medalist(s)		Winarni Binti Slamet	Indonesia

The women's 53 kilograms weightlifting event at the 2000 Summer Olympics in Sydney, Australia took place at the Sydney Convention and Exhibition Centre on September 18.

Total score was the sum of the lifter's best result in each of the snatch and the clean and jerk, with three lifts allowed for each lift. In case of a tie, the lighter lifter won; if still tied, the lifter who took the fewest attempts to achieve the total score won. Lifters without a valid snatch score did not perform the clean and jerk.

== Schedule ==
All times are Australian Eastern Time (UTC+10:00)

Date	Time	Event
18 September 2000	14:30	Group A

== Records ==
Prior to this competition, the existing world and Olympic records were as follows.

World Record	Snatch	Meng Xianjuan (CHN)	97.5 kg	Chiba, Japan	1 May 1999
World Record	Clean & Jerk	Li Feng-ying (TPE)	121.5 kg	Athens, Greece	21 November 1999
World Record	Total	Meng Xianjuan (CHN)	217.5 kg	Chiba, Japan	1 May 1999
Olympic Record	Snatch	Olympic Standard	97.5 kg	—	1 January 1997
Olympic Record	Clean & Jerk	Olympic Standard	120.0 kg	—	1 January 1997
Olympic Record	Total	Olympic Standard	217.5 kg	—	1 January 1997

== Results ==
Rank	Athlete	Group	Body weight	Snatch (kg)				Clean & Jerk (kg)				Total
Rank	Athlete	Group	Body weight	1	2	3	Result	1	2	3	Result	Total
1st place, gold medalist(s)	Yang Xia (CHN)	A	52.46	95.0	97.5	100.0	100.0	122.5	125.0	—	125.0	225.0
2nd place, silver medalist(s)	Li Feng-ying (TPE)	A	52.42	92.5	98.0	~~100.0~~	97.5	115.0	~~125.0~~	~~127.5~~	115.0	212.5
3rd place, bronze medalist(s)	Winarni Binti Slamet (INA)	A	52.44	~~85.0~~	85.0	90.0	90.0	105.0	110.0	112.5	112.5	202.5
4	Franca Gbodo (NGR)	A	52.00	85.0	~~90.0~~	~~90.0~~	85.0	105.0	110.0	~~117.5~~	110.0	195.0
5	Swe Swe Win (MYA)	A	52.08	85.0	~~87.5~~	~~87.5~~	85.0	105.0	110.0	~~117.5~~	110.0	195.0
6	Sanamacha Chanu (IND)	A	52.16	80.0	85.0	~~87.5~~	85.0	105.0	110.0	~~117.5~~	110.0	195.0
7	Mari Nakaga (JPN)	A	52.58	~~77.5~~	~~77.5~~	77.5	77.5	105.0	~~110.0~~	~~110.0~~	105.0	182.5
8	Marioara Munteanu (ROM)	A	53.00	75.0	80.0	82.5	82.5	92.5	97.5	~~102.5~~	97.5	180.0
9	Karla Fernández (VEN)	A	52.60	~~80.0~~	80.0	~~85.0~~	80.0	~~95.0~~	~~95.0~~	95.0	95.0	175.0
10	Tarana Abbasova (AZE)	A	52.78	70.0	~~75.0~~	75.0	75.0	85.0	90.0	~~92.5~~	90.0	165.0

== New records ==
Snatch	98.0 kg	Li Feng-ying (TPE)	WR
Snatch	100.0 kg	Yang Xia (CHN)	WR
Clean & Jerk	122.5 kg	Yang Xia (CHN)	WR
Clean & Jerk	125.0 kg	Yang Xia (CHN)	WR
Total	222.5 kg	Yang Xia (CHN)	WR
Total	225.0 kg	Yang Xia (CHN)	WR
