= Amanda Phillips =

Australian weightlifter

Personal information
- Full name: Amanda Susan Phillips
- Born: 4 July 1981 (age 44) Brisbane, Australia
- Height: 164 cm (5 ft 5 in)
- Weight: 69.81 kg (153.9 lb)

Sport
- Country: Australia
- Sport: Weightlifting
- Weight class: 75 kg
- Team: National team
- Updated on 28 September 2016

Amanda Susan Phillips (born 4 July 1981 in Brisbane) is an Australian weightlifter, competing in the 75 kg category and representing Australia at international competitions. She participated at the 2000 Summer Olympics in the 63 kg event. She competed at world championships, most recently at the 1999 World Weightlifting Championships.

== Major results ==
Year	Venue	Weight	Snatch (kg)				Clean & Jerk (kg)				Total	Rank
Year	Venue	Weight	1	2	3	Rank	1	2	3	Rank	Total	Rank
Summer Olympics
2000	Sydney, Australia	63 kg				—N/a				—N/a		6
World Championships
1999	Piraeus, Greece	75 kg	77.5	~~80~~	80	24	100	~~105~~	105	23	185	23
