= Michelle Kettner =

Australian weightlifter

Personal information
- Full name: Michelle Kettner
- Born: 19 February 1973 (age 53) Melbourne, Australia
- Height: 162 cm (5 ft 4 in)
- Weight: 67.70 kg (149.3 lb)

Sport
- Country: Australia
- Sport: Weightlifting
- Weight class: 69 kg
- Club: Burwood PCYC
- Team: National team
- Coached by: Paul Coffa
- Updated on 28 September 2016

Michelle Kettner (born 19 February 1973 in Melbourne) is a former Australian weightlifter, competing in the 69 kg category and representing Australia at international competitions, having held Commonwealth, Oceania and Australian records.

She participated at the 2000 Summer Olympics in the 69 kg event. She competed at six world championships (1993, 1994, 1995, 1997, 1998, 1999), most recent was the 1999 World Weightlifting Championships. In 2000 she became the first Australian female to snatch 100 kg and set Australian records in both the snatch and clean and jerk in that year.

== Major results ==
Year	Venue	Weight	Snatch (kg)				Clean & Jerk (kg)				Total	Rank
Year	Venue	Weight	1	2	3	Rank	1	2	3	Rank	Total	Rank
Summer Olympics
2000	Sydney, Australia	69 kg				—N/a				—N/a		9
World Championships
1999	Piraeus, Greece	69 kg	92.5	97.5	~~100~~	9	110	~~117.5~~	~~117.5~~	17	207.5	12
1998	Lahti, Finland	63 kg	82.5	~~87.5~~	~~87.5~~	11	102.5	~~107.5~~	~~107.5~~	11	185	11
