= Weightlifting at the 2000 Summer Olympics – Women's 69 kg =

Weightlifting at the Olympics

Women's 69 kg at the Games of the XXVII Olympiad
- Venue: Sydney Convention and Exhibition Centre
- Date: 19 September 2000
- Competitors: 15 from 13 nations

Medalists
1st place, gold medalist(s)		Lin Weining	China
2nd place, silver medalist(s)		Erzsébet Márkus	Hungary
3rd place, bronze medalist(s)		Karnam Malleswari	India

The women's 69 kilograms weightlifting event at the 2000 Summer Olympics in Sydney, Australia took place at the Sydney Convention and Exhibition Centre on September 19.

Total score was the sum of the lifter's best result in each of the snatch and the clean and jerk, with three lifts allowed for each lift. In case of a tie, the lighter lifter won; if still tied, the lifter who took the fewest attempts to achieve the total score won. Lifters without a valid snatch score did not perform the clean and jerk.

== Schedule ==
All times are Australian Eastern Time (UTC+10:00)

Date	Time	Event
19 September 2000	18:30	Group A

== Records ==
Prior to this competition, the existing world and Olympic records were as follows.

World Record	Snatch	Liu Dongping (CHN)	111.5 kg	Prague, Czech Republic	6 July 2000
World Record	Clean & Jerk	Sun Tianni (CHN)	143.0 kg	Athens, Greece	24 November 1999
World Record	Total	Lin Weining (CHN)	252.5 kg	Wuhan, China	29 August 1999
Olympic Record	Snatch	Olympic Standard	110.0 kg	—	1 January 1997
Olympic Record	Clean & Jerk	Olympic Standard	142.5 kg	—	1 January 1997
Olympic Record	Total	Olympic Standard	252.5 kg	—	1 January 1997

== Results ==
Rank	Athlete	Group	Body weight	Snatch (kg)				Clean & Jerk (kg)				Total
Rank	Athlete	Group	Body weight	1	2	3	Result	1	2	3	Result	Total
1st place, gold medalist(s)	Lin Weining (CHN)	A	66.74	107.5	110.0	~~112.5~~	110.0	132.5	~~137.5~~	~~145.0~~	132.5	242.5
2nd place, silver medalist(s)	Erzsébet Márkus (HUN)	A	68.52	105.0	110.0	112.5	112.5	125.0	130.0	~~137.5~~	130.0	242.5
3rd place, bronze medalist(s)	Karnam Malleswari (IND)	A	67.90	105.0	107.5	110.0	110.0	125.0	130.0	~~137.5~~	130.0	240.0
4	Milena Trendafilova (BUL)	A	67.76	100.0	~~105.0~~	~~105.0~~	100.0	127.5	~~132.5~~	132.5	132.5	232.5
5	Daniela Kerkelova (BUL)	A	68.12	97.5	~~100.0~~	100.0	100.0	127.5	~~132.5~~	132.5	132.5	232.5
6	Irina Kasimova (RUS)	A	68.56	100.0	~~102.5~~	~~102.5~~	100.0	130.0	~~135.0~~	~~135.0~~	130.0	230.0
7	Pawina Thongsuk (THA)	A	67.22	~~100.0~~	100.0	~~105.0~~	100.0	~~125.0~~	125.0	~~132.5~~	125.0	225.0
8	Beata Prei (POL)	A	67.50	95.0	100.0	~~102.5~~	100.0	125.0	~~130.0~~	~~130.0~~	125.0	225.0
9	Michelle Kettner (AUS)	A	67.80	~~95.0~~	95.0	100.0	100.0	115.0	120.0	122.5	122.5	222.5
10	Aphinya Pharksupho (THA)	A	68.28	95.0	102.5	~~105.0~~	102.5	120.0	~~127.5~~	~~127.5~~	120.0	222.5
11	Maria Tatsi (GRE)	A	67.42	92.5	~~97.5~~	~~97.5~~	92.5	122.5	127.5	~~132.5~~	127.5	220.0
12	Eva Dimas (ESA)	A	68.40	87.5	90.0	92.5	92.5	110.0	~~115.0~~	~~115.0~~	110.0	202.5
13	Ruth Rivera (PUR)	A	67.28	~~82.5~~	82.5	~~85.0~~	82.5	100.0	105.0	~~107.5~~	105.0	187.5
14	Valerie Pedro (PLW)	A	68.04	70.0	~~75.0~~	~~75.0~~	70.0	~~87.5~~	87.5	90.0	90.0	160.0
—	Nagwan El-Zawawi (EGY)	A	68.20	87.5	92.5	~~95.0~~	92.5	~~110.0~~	~~110.0~~	~~110.0~~	—	—

== New records ==
Snatch	112.5 kg	Erzsébet Márkus (HUN)	WR
