= Beata Prei =

Polish weightlifter

Personal information
- Full name: Beata Prei
- Born: 1 January 1977 (age 49) Więcbork, Poland
- Height: 168 cm (5 ft 6 in)
- Weight: 68.54 kg (151.1 lb)

Sport
- Country: Poland
- Sport: Weightlifting
- Weight class: 69 kg
- Club: ŁKS Grom Więcbork
- Team: National team
- Updated on 28 September 2016

Beata Prei (born 1 January 1977 in Więcbork) was a Polish weightlifter, competing in the 69 kg category and representing Poland at international competitions.

She participated at the 2000 Summer Olympics in the 69 kg event. She competed at world championships, most recently at the 1999 World Weightlifting Championships.

== Major results ==
| Year | Venue | Weight | Snatch (kg) | | | | Clean & Jerk (kg) | | | | Total | Rank |
| Year | Venue | Weight | 1 | 2 | 3 | Rank | 1 | 2 | 3 | Rank | Total | Rank |
Summer Olympics
| 2000 | Sydney, Australia | 69 kg | 95.0 | 100.0 | ~~102.5~~ | 5 | 125.0 | ~~130.0~~ | ~~130.0~~ | 9 | 225.0 | 8 |
World Championships
| 1999 | Piraeus, Greece | 69 kg | 92.5 | 97.5 | ~~100~~ | 10 | 122.5 | ~~127.5~~ | ~~127.5~~ | 9 | 220 | 9 |
| 1998 | Lahti, Finland | 69 kg | 90 | 95 | ~~97.5~~ | 5 | 115 | 120 | 122.5 | 5 | 217.5 | 5 |
