= 1996 World Weightlifting Championships – Women's 70 kg =

The 1996 World Weightlifting Championships were held in Warsaw, Poland from 3 May to 11 May. The women's competition in the 70 kilograms division was staged on 8 May.

== Medalists ==
Event	Gold		Silver		Bronze	
Snatch	Ilona Dankó (HUN)	97.5 kg	Tang Weifang (CHN)	95.0 kg	Irina Komendanskaya (RUS)	92.5 kg
Clean & Jerk	Tang Weifang (CHN)	127.5 kg	Irina Kasimova (RUS)	122.5 kg	Kim Dong-hee (KOR)	120.0 kg
Total	Tang Weifang (CHN)	222.5 kg	Irina Kasimova (RUS)	212.5 kg	Kim Dong-hee (KOR)	212.5 kg

== Records ==
Prior to this competition, the existing world records were as follows.

World record	Snatch	Tang Weifang (CHN)	102.5 kg	Hiroshima, Japan	4 October 1994
World record	Clean & Jerk	Tang Weifang (CHN)	129.0 kg	Guangzhou, China	22 November 1995
World record	Total	Tang Weifang (CHN)	230.0 kg	Hiroshima, Japan	4 October 1994

== Results ==
Rank	Athlete	Body weight	Snatch (kg)				Clean & Jerk (kg)				Total
Rank	Athlete	Body weight	1	2	3	Rank	1	2	3	Rank	Total
1st place, gold medalist(s)	Tang Weifang (CHN)	69.45	90.0	95.0	—	2nd place, silver medalist(s)	122.5	127.5	~~130.0~~	1st place, gold medalist(s)	222.5
2nd place, silver medalist(s)	Irina Kasimova (RUS)	67.50	90.0	~~95.0~~	~~95.0~~	5	~~120.0~~	122.5	~~127.5~~	2nd place, silver medalist(s)	212.5
3rd place, bronze medalist(s)	Kim Dong-hee (KOR)	68.40	87.5	92.5	~~95.0~~	4	115.0	117.5	120.0	3rd place, bronze medalist(s)	212.5
4	Ilona Dankó (HUN)	69.15	90.0	95.0	97.5	1st place, gold medalist(s)	107.5	~~112.5~~	112.5	6	210.0
5	Irina Komendanskaya (RUS)	66.80	87.5	92.5	~~95.0~~	3rd place, bronze medalist(s)	107.5	112.5	~~115.0~~	5	205.0
6	Kumi Haseba (JPN)	69.00	85.0	90.0	~~92.5~~	6	110.0	115.0	~~117.5~~	4	205.0
7	Chen Shu-man (TPE)	69.20	90.0	~~92.5~~	~~92.5~~	7	110.0	~~115.0~~	~~115.0~~	7	200.0
8	Maria Tatsi (GRE)	69.65	80.0	85.0	87.5	8	110.0	~~115.0~~	~~117.5~~	8	197.5
9	Radomíra Ševčíková (CZE)	70.00	~~85.0~~	~~85.0~~	85.0	9	107.5	~~112.5~~	~~117.5~~	9	192.5
10	Susanna Samuelsson (FIN)	68.70	77.5	~~80.0~~	~~80.0~~	12	105.0	~~107.5~~	~~107.5~~	10	182.5
11	Robin Weckert (AUS)	69.95	~~75.0~~	75.0	80.0	10	95.0	100.0	102.5	12	182.5
12	Kerri Hanebrink (USA)	70.00	75.0	~~80.0~~	80.0	11	~~95.0~~	95.0	~~102.5~~	13	175.0
13	Silvia Baraniaková (CZE)	69.25	75.0	~~80.0~~	~~80.0~~	13	~~90.0~~	90.0	~~95.0~~	14	165.0
—	María Dolores Martínez (ESP)	69.90	~~85.0~~	~~85.0~~	~~85.0~~	—	100.0	105.0	~~110.0~~	11	—
