= 1997 World Weightlifting Championships – Women's 50 kg =

The 1997 World Weightlifting Championships were held in Chiang Mai, Thailand from December 6 to December 14. The women's competition in the 50 kg division was staged on 6 December 1997.

== Medalists ==
Event	Gold		Silver		Bronze	
Snatch	Zhong Yan (CHN)	85.0 kg	Izabela Dragneva (BUL)	82.5 kg	Winarni Binti Slamet (INA)	80.0 kg
Clean & Jerk	Winarni Binti Slamet (INA)	105.0 kg	Izabela Dragneva (BUL)	102.5 kg	Swe Swe Win (MYA)	100.0 kg
Total	Winarni Binti Slamet (INA)	185.0 kg	Izabela Dragneva (BUL)	185.0 kg	Ri Yong-hwa (PRK)	180.0 kg

== Records ==
Prior to this competition, the existing world records were as follows.

World Record	Snatch	Jiang Baoyu (CHN)	88.0 kg	Busan, South Korea	3 July 1995
World Record	Clean & Jerk	Liu Xiuhua (CHN)	110.5 kg	Hiroshima, Japan	3 October 1994
World Record	Total	Liu Xiuhua (CHN)	197.5 kg	Hiroshima, Japan	3 October 1994

== Results ==
Rank	Athlete	Body weight	Snatch (kg)				Clean & Jerk (kg)				Total
Rank	Athlete	Body weight	1	2	3	Rank	1	2	3	Rank	Total
1st place, gold medalist(s)	Winarni Binti Slamet (INA)	48.95	77.5	80.0	~~85.0~~	3rd place, bronze medalist(s)	100.0	105.0	~~111.0~~	1st place, gold medalist(s)	185.0
2nd place, silver medalist(s)	Izabela Dragneva (BUL)	49.10	75.0	80.0	82.5	2nd place, silver medalist(s)	95.0	100.0	102.5	2nd place, silver medalist(s)	185.0
3rd place, bronze medalist(s)	Ri Yong-hwa (PRK)	49.80	80.0	~~82.5~~	~~82.5~~	4	100.0	~~105.0~~	~~105.0~~	4	180.0
4	Chu Nan-mei (TPE)	49.15	~~77.5~~	77.5	~~80.0~~	5	97.5	~~102.5~~	~~102.5~~	6	175.0
5	Swe Swe Win (MYA)	49.65	~~75.0~~	75.0	~~80.0~~	10	~~100.0~~	100.0	~~105.0~~	3rd place, bronze medalist(s)	175.0
6	Sanamacha Chanu (IND)	49.95	72.5	75.0	77.5	7	95.0	97.5	~~100.0~~	7	175.0
7	Kaori Niyanagi (JPN)	48.80	70.0	~~75.0~~	75.0	9	92.5	97.5	~~100.0~~	5	172.5
8	Robin Goad (USA)	50.00	75.0	77.5	~~80.0~~	8	90.0	95.0	~~97.5~~	11	172.5
9	Choi Myung-shik (KOR)	49.45	72.5	~~77.5~~	77.5	6	90.0	~~97.5~~	~~97.5~~	13	167.5
10	Tara Nott (USA)	49.90	67.5	72.5	~~75.0~~	11	90.0	~~95.0~~	95.0	10	167.5
11	Noriko Hasegawa (JPN)	49.80	70.0	~~75.0~~	~~75.0~~	14	90.0	92.5	95.0	9	165.0
12	Chittiya Unchai (THA)	49.95	65.0	70.0	72.5	12	80.0	85.0	~~90.0~~	17	157.5
13	Estefanía Juan (ESP)	49.25	62.5	65.0	~~67.5~~	17	~~90.0~~	90.0	~~92.5~~	12	155.0
14	Dahbia Rigaud (FRA)	49.35	62.5	65.0	67.5	15	82.5	85.0	87.5	14	155.0
15	Rebeca Sires (ESP)	49.75	67.5	70.0	~~72.5~~	13	82.5	85.0	~~87.5~~	16	155.0
16	Evdokia Chatziavramidou (GRE)	49.80	65.0	~~67.5~~	~~67.5~~	16	82.5	85.0	~~87.5~~	15	150.0
17	Amanda Inman (AUS)	49.40	~~55.0~~	55.0	60.0	18	70.0	72.5	75.0	18	135.0
18	Sabrin Kamel (EGY)	49.60	55.0	~~60.0~~	60.0	19	72.5	75.0	~~77.5~~	19	135.0
19	Dilek Selçuk (TUR)	49.80	~~57.5~~	57.5	~~62.5~~	20	65.0	72.5	~~75.0~~	20	130.0
—	Zhong Yan (CHN)	49.70	~~80.0~~	80.0	85.0	1st place, gold medalist(s)	—	—	—	—	—
—	Penphan Moonmongkol (THA)	49.70	~~72.5~~	~~72.5~~	~~72.5~~	—	95.0	~~100.0~~	~~100.0~~	8	—
