= Tarana Abbasova =

Azerbaijani weightlifter (born 1967)

Personal information
- Full name: Tarana Abbasova
- Born: 13 January 1967 (age 59)
- Height: 159 cm (5 ft 3 in)
- Weight: 57.01 kg (125.7 lb)

Sport
- Country: Azerbaijan
- Sport: Weightlifting
- Weight class: 58 kg
- Team: National team
- Updated on 28 September 2016

Tarana Abbasova (original name: Təranə Abbasova (born 13 January 1967) is an Azerbaijani weightlifter, competing in the 58 kg category and representing Azerbaijan at international competitions.

Abbasova participated at the 2000 Summer Olympics in the 53 kg event. She competed at world championships, most recently at the 1999 World Weightlifting Championships.

== Major results ==
| Year | Venue | Weight | Snatch (kg) | | | | Clean & Jerk (kg) | | | | Total | Rank |
| Year | Venue | Weight | 1 | 2 | 3 | Rank | 1 | 2 | 3 | Rank | Total | Rank |
Summer Olympics
| 2000 | Sydney, Australia | 53 kg | | | | —N/a | | | | —N/a | | 10 |
World Championships
| 1999 | Piraeus, Greece | 58 kg | 75 | 80 | 82.5 | 12 | 97.5 | ~~102.5~~ | ~~102.5~~ | 25 | 180 | 21 |
| 1998 | Lahti, Finland | 53 kg | ~~67.5~~ | 67.5 | ~~70~~ | 9 | 82.5 | ~~85~~ | ~~85~~ | 10 | 150 | 9 |
