= Ruth Rivera =

Puerto Rican weightlifter

Personal information
- Full name: Felix Ruth Rivera
- Born: 21 August 1978 (age 47) Caguas, Puerto Rico
- Height: 157 cm (5 ft 2 in)
- Weight: 62.75 kg (138.3 lb)

Sport
- Country: Puerto Rico
- Sport: Weightlifting
- Weight class: 63 kg
- Team: National team
- Updated on 13 September 2016

Ruth Rivera Felix (born 21 August 1978) is a Puerto Rican female weightlifter, competing in the 63 kg category and representing Puerto Rico at international competitions.

She participated at the 2000 Summer Olympics in the 63 kg event. She competed at world championships, at the 2003 World Weightlifting Championships.

== Major results ==
Year	Venue	Weight	Snatch (kg)				Clean & Jerk (kg)				Total	Rank
Year	Venue	Weight	1	2	3	Rank	1	2	3	Rank	Total	Rank
Summer Olympics
2000	Sydney, Australia	63 kg				—N/a				—N/a		13
World Championships
2003	Vancouver, Canada	63 kg	~~87.5~~	~~87.5~~	~~87.5~~	---	---	---	---	---	0	---
1999	Piraeus, Greece	69 kg	80	85	~~87.5~~	23	100	105	~~110~~	23	190	24
