= 1998 World Weightlifting Championships – Women's 69 kg =

The 1998 World Weightlifting Championships were held in Lahti, Finland from November 7 to November 15. The women's competition in the light-heavyweight (69 kg division) was staged on 13 November 1998.

== Medalists ==
Event	Gold		Silver		Bronze	
Snatch	Tang Weifang (CHN)	110.0 kg	Erzsébet Márkus (HUN)	102.5 kg	Wu Mei-yi (TPE)	100.0 kg
Clean & Jerk	Tang Weifang (CHN)	130.0 kg	Wu Mei-yi (TPE)	127.5 kg	Irina Kasimova (RUS)	127.5 kg
Total	Tang Weifang (CHN)	240.0 kg	Wu Mei-yi (TPE)	227.5 kg	Irina Kasimova (RUS)	225.0 kg

== Records ==
Prior to this competition, the existing world records were as follows.

World record	Snatch	Tang Weifang (CHN)	110.0 kg	Ramat Gan, Israel	24 April 1998
World record	Clean & Jerk	Shang Shichun (CHN)	133.5 kg	Sofia, Bulgaria	22 May 1998
World record	Total	Tang Weifang (CHN)	242.5 kg	Ramat Gan, Israel	24 April 1998

== Results ==
Rank	Athlete	Body weight	Snatch (kg)				Clean & Jerk (kg)				Total
Rank	Athlete	Body weight	1	2	3	Rank	1	2	3	Rank	Total
1st place, gold medalist(s)	Tang Weifang (CHN)	68.90	105.0	110.5	—	1st place, gold medalist(s)	130.0	~~135.0~~	~~135.0~~	1st place, gold medalist(s)	240.0
2nd place, silver medalist(s)	Wu Mei-yi (TPE)	67.91	~~95.0~~	95.0	100.0	3rd place, bronze medalist(s)	~~125.0~~	125.0	127.5	2nd place, silver medalist(s)	227.5
3rd place, bronze medalist(s)	Irina Kasimova (RUS)	68.48	~~95.0~~	95.0	97.5	4	125.0	127.5	~~132.5~~	3rd place, bronze medalist(s)	225.0
4	Erzsébet Márkus (HUN)	67.82	100.0	102.5	~~105.0~~	2nd place, silver medalist(s)	~~120.0~~	120.0	~~122.5~~	6	222.5
5	Beata Prei (POL)	68.40	90.0	95.0	~~97.5~~	5	115.0	120.0	122.5	5	217.5
6	Daniela Kerkelova (BUL)	68.26	90.0	~~95.0~~	~~95.0~~	9	117.5	122.5	~~127.5~~	4	212.5
7	Park Mi-jung (KOR)	68.39	87.5	92.5	~~97.5~~	7	115.0	~~120.0~~	~~120.0~~	7	207.5
8	Lea Foreman (USA)	65.43	~~92.5~~	~~92.5~~	92.5	6	105.0	110.0	~~115.0~~	9	202.5
9	Stephanie Mantek (GER)	67.63	85.0	~~87.5~~	~~87.5~~	10	107.5	110.0	~~112.5~~	10	195.0
10	Susanna Samuelsson (FIN)	67.83	80.0	82.5	~~85.0~~	12	105.0	110.0	~~112.5~~	11	192.5
11	Maria Tatsi (GRE)	68.09	~~80.0~~	80.0	~~85.0~~	14	107.5	~~112.5~~	112.5	8	192.5
12	Suzanne Leathers (USA)	67.82	82.5	~~87.5~~	~~90.0~~	11	100.0	105.0	~~110.0~~	12	187.5
13	Simone Ingram (AUS)	68.21	77.5	80.0	82.5	13	~~100.0~~	100.0	~~102.5~~	13	182.5
14	Tina Beiter (DEN)	68.16	~~70.0~~	70.0	75.0	15	92.5	97.5	~~100.0~~	14	172.5
15	Beate Amdahl (NOR)	68.69	70.0	75.0	~~77.5~~	16	95.0	~~100.0~~	~~100.0~~	15	170.0
—	Nagwan El-Zawawi (EGY)	68.25	85.0	~~90.0~~	90.0	8	~~110.0~~	~~110.0~~	~~110.0~~	—	—

== New records ==
Snatch	110.5 kg	Tang Weifang (CHN)	WR
