= Mónica Carrió =

Spanish weightlifter

Personal information
- Full name: Mónica Carrió Esteban
- Born: 28 March 1977 (age 48); Alzira, Spain
- Height: 170 cm (5 ft 7 in)
- Weight: 74.42 kg (164 lb)

Sport
- Country: Spain
- Sport: Weightlifting
- Weight class: 75 kg
- Club: Halterofilia Alzira, Alzira (ESP)
- Team: National team
- Updated on 27 September 2016

Mónica Carrió Esteban (born 28 March 1977 in Alzira) is a former weightlifter, competing in the 75 kg category and representing Spain at international competitions.

She participated at the 2000 Summer Olympics in the 75 kg event. She competed at world championships, most recently at the 2001 World Weightlifting Championships.

Mónica is the sister of weightlifter Lorenzo Carrió, who competed at the 1996 Summer Olympics.

== Major results ==
Year	Venue	Weight	Snatch (kg)				Clean & Jerk (kg)				Total	Rank
Year	Venue	Weight	1	2	3	Rank	1	2	3	Rank	Total	Rank
Summer Olympics
2000	Sydney, Australia	75 kg				—				—		9
World Championships
2001	Antalya, Turkey	75 kg	95	~~97.5~~	~~97.5~~	14	110	~~112.5~~	112.5	13	207.5	13
1999	Piraeus, Greece	75 kg	100	102.5	~~105~~	6	115	120	~~122.5~~	14	222.5	10
1998	Lahti, Finland	75 kg	97.5	100	~~102.5~~	2nd place, silver medalist(s)	112.5	~~117.5~~	117.5	9	217.5	5
