= 1998 World Weightlifting Championships – Women's 75 kg =

The 1998 World Weightlifting Championships were held in Lahti, Finland from November 7 to November 15. The women's competition in the heavyweight (75 kg) division was staged on 14 November 1998.

== Medalists ==
Event	Gold		Silver		Bronze	
Snatch	Karoliina Lundahl (FIN)	105.0 kg	Mónica Carrió (ESP)	100.0 kg	Şule Şahbaz (TUR)	100.0 kg
Clean & Jerk	Gao Xiaoyan (CHN)	130.0 kg	Karoliina Lundahl (FIN)	125.0 kg	Mária Takács (HUN)	120.0 kg
Total	Karoliina Lundahl (FIN)	230.0 kg	Şule Şahbaz (TUR)	220.0 kg	Mária Takács (HUN)	217.5 kg

== Records ==
Prior to this competition, the existing world records were as follows.

World Record	Snatch	Zhao La (CHN)	111.5 kg	Chongqing, China	20 September 1998
World Record	Clean & Jerk	World Standard	140.0 kg	—	1 January 1998
World Record	Total	World Standard	250.0 kg	—	1 January 1998

== Results ==
Rank	Athlete	Body weight	Snatch (kg)				Clean & Jerk (kg)				Total
Rank	Athlete	Body weight	1	2	3	Rank	1	2	3	Rank	Total
1st place, gold medalist(s)	Karoliina Lundahl (FIN)	74.36	100.0	~~105.0~~	105.0	1st place, gold medalist(s)	120.0	122.5	125.0	2nd place, silver medalist(s)	230.0
2nd place, silver medalist(s)	Şule Şahbaz (TUR)	74.08	100.0	~~105.0~~	~~105.0~~	3rd place, bronze medalist(s)	120.0	~~125.0~~	~~125.0~~	6	220.0
3rd place, bronze medalist(s)	Mária Takács (HUN)	70.75	~~97.5~~	97.5	~~100.0~~	4	~~120.0~~	120.0	~~125.0~~	3rd place, bronze medalist(s)	217.5
4	Cara Heads (USA)	73.14	92.5	95.0	97.5	5	107.5	115.0	120.0	4	217.5
5	Mónica Carrió (ESP)	73.80	97.5	100.0	~~102.5~~	2nd place, silver medalist(s)	112.5	~~117.5~~	117.5	9	217.5
6	Radomíra Ševčíková (CZE)	74.31	90.0	95.0	~~100.0~~	8	115.0	120.0	~~125.0~~	7	215.0
7	Line Mary (FRA)	74.42	95.0	~~100.0~~	~~100.0~~	9	115.0	120.0	~~122.5~~	8	215.0
8	Jeane Lassen (CAN)	73.37	85.0	~~90.0~~	~~90.0~~	13	115.0	~~120.0~~	120.0	5	205.0
9	Manuela Torazza (ITA)	70.27	87.5	92.5	95.0	6	107.5	~~112.5~~	~~112.5~~	11	202.5
10	Caroline Pileggi (AUS)	74.95	87.5	~~90.0~~	90.0	11	112.5	~~117.5~~	~~117.5~~	10	202.5
11	Venera Mannanova (RUS)	74.06	95.0	~~100.0~~	~~102.5~~	7	100.0	—	—	19	195.0
12	Hiromi Fujiwara (JPN)	74.59	85.0	90.0	~~95.0~~	10	105.0	~~110.0~~	~~110.0~~	13	195.0
13	Theano Zagkliveri (GRE)	73.80	85.0	~~87.5~~	87.5	12	100.0	105.0	~~107.5~~	12	192.5
14	Margarita Rojas (COL)	73.81	85.0	~~90.0~~	~~90.0~~	14	102.5	~~107.5~~	~~107.5~~	14	187.5
15	Filippia Kochliaridou (GRE)	74.44	82.5	~~85.0~~	~~85.0~~	16	102.5	~~107.5~~	~~107.5~~	16	185.0
16	Diana Back (FIN)	74.45	82.5	~~87.5~~	~~87.5~~	17	102.5	~~105.0~~	~~105.0~~	17	185.0
17	Rachel Clark (GBR)	73.10	80.0	82.5	~~85.0~~	15	100.0	~~102.5~~	~~102.5~~	18	182.5
18	Zuzana Kováčová (SVK)	73.89	77.5	~~82.5~~	~~82.5~~	18	~~102.5~~	102.5	~~107.5~~	15	180.0
19	Rosetta Penani (NRU)	74.17	75.0	~~80.0~~	~~80.0~~	19	100.0	~~102.5~~	~~102.5~~	20	175.0
—	Ilona Dankó (HUN)	71.99	~~100.0~~	~~100.0~~	~~100.0~~	—	—	—	—	—	—
—	Kuo Shu-fen (TPE)	73.62	~~100.0~~	~~100.0~~	~~100.0~~	—	—	—	—	—	—
—	Gao Xiaoyan (CHN)	73.98	~~105.0~~	~~105.0~~	~~105.0~~	—	125.0	127.5	130.0	1st place, gold medalist(s)	—
