= Manuela Torazza =

Italian weightlifter and shot putter

Personal information
- Full name: Manuela Torazza
- Born: 27 June 1968 (age 58)
- Weight: 65.53 kg (144.5 lb)

Sport
- Country: Italy
- Sport: Weightlifting
- Weight class: 69 kg
- Team: National team
- Updated on 11 September 2016

Manuela Torazza (born 27 June 1968) is an Italian female weightlifter and former shot putter.

She competed in the 69 kg category and represented Italy at international competitions. She competed at world championship level, most recently at the 2006 World Weightlifting Championships.

== Major results ==
Year	Venue	Weight	Snatch (kg)				Clean & Jerk (kg)				Total	Rank
Year	Venue	Weight	1	2	3	Rank	1	2	3	Rank	Total	Rank
World Championships
2006	Santo Domingo, Dominican Republic	69 kg	~~76~~	76	79	23	94	~~99~~	~~99~~	24	173.0	24
1999	Piraeus, Greece	69 kg	~~85~~	~~85~~	~~85~~	---	---	---	---	---	0	---
1998	Lahti, Finland	75 kg	87.5	92.5	95	6	107.5	~~112.5~~	~~112.5~~	11	202.5	9
1997		76 kg										

== See also ==
- Italian all-time lists - Shot put
