= Stephanie Mantek =

German weightlifter

Personal information
- Born: 10 March 1971 (age 55)
- Weight: 71.68 kg (158.0 lb)

Sport
- Country: Germany
- Sport: Weightlifting
- Weight class: 75 kg
- Team: National team
- Updated on 28 September 2016

Stephanie Mantek (born 10 March 1971) is a German weightlifter, competing in the 75 kg category and representing Germany at international competitions. She competed at the 1998 World Weightlifting Championships and 1999 Championships.

== Major results ==
Year	Venue	Weight	Snatch (kg)				Clean & Jerk (kg)				Total	Rank
Year	Venue	Weight	1	2	3	Rank	1	2	3	Rank	Total	Rank
World Championships
1999	Piraeus, Greece	75 kg	92.5	95	~~97.5~~	16	115	120	~~122.5~~	13	215	15
1998	Lahti, Finland	69 kg	85	~~87.5~~	~~87.5~~	10	107.5	110	~~112.5~~	10	195	9
