= Mari Nakaga =

Japanese weightlifter

Personal information
- Full name: Mari Nakaga
- Born: 12 November 1975 (age 50) Okinawa, Japan
- Height: 156 cm (5 ft 1 in)
- Weight: 57.60 kg (127.0 lb)

Sport
- Country: Japan
- Sport: Weightlifting
- Weight class: 58 kg
- Team: National team
- Updated on 27 September 2016

Mari Nakaga (仲嘉 真理, born 12 November 1975 in Okinawa) was a Japanese female weightlifter, competing in the 58 kg category and representing Japan at international competitions.

She participated at the 2000 Summer Olympics in the 53 kg event. She competed at world championships, most recently at the 2002 World Weightlifting Championships.

== Major results ==
Year	Venue	Weight	Snatch (kg)				Clean & Jerk (kg)				Total	Rank
Year	Venue	Weight	1	2	3	Rank	1	2	3	Rank	Total	Rank
Summer Olympics
2000	Sydney, Australia	53 kg				—N/a				—N/a		7
World Championships
2002	Warsaw, Poland	58 kg	75	~~80~~	~~80~~	19	97.5	~~102.5~~	~~102.5~~	20	172.5	18
1999	Piraeus, Greece	53 kg	80	82.5	~~85~~	10	105	~~110~~	110	4	192.5	5
