= Franca Gbodo =

Nigerian weightlifter

Personal information
- Full name: Franca Pamiendi Gbodo
- Born: 1982 (age 43–44)
- Height: 155 cm (5 ft 1 in)
- Weight: 56.72 kg (125.0 lb)

Sport
- Country: Nigeria
- Sport: Weightlifting
- Weight class: 58 kg
- Team: National team
- Updated on 13 September 2016

Franca Pamiendi Gbodo (born 1982) was a Nigerian female weightlifter, competing in the 58 kg category and representing Nigeria at international competitions.

She participated at the 2000 Summer Olympics in the 53 kg event, and at the 2004 Summer Olympics in the 58 kg event. She competed at world championships, most recently at the 2003 World Weightlifting Championships.

== Major results ==
Year	Venue	Weight	Snatch (kg)				Clean & Jerk (kg)				Total	Rank
Year	Venue	Weight	1	2	3	Rank	1	2	3	Rank	Total	Rank
Summer Olympics
2004	Athens, Italy	58 kg				—N/a				—N/a		10
2000	Sydney, Australia	53 kg				—N/a				—N/a		4
World Championships
2003	Vancouver, Canada	58 kg	~~87.5~~	~~87.5~~	87.5	14	~~112.5~~	112.5	~~117.5~~	10	200	10
