= 1998 World Weightlifting Championships – Women's 53 kg =

The 1998 World Weightlifting Championships were held in Lahti, Finland from November 7 to November 15. The women's competition in the featherweight (53 kg) division was staged on 10 November 1998.

== Medalists ==
Event	Gold		Silver		Bronze	
Snatch	Wang Xiufen (CHN)	92.5 kg	Izabela Dragneva (BUL)	87.5 kg	Robin Goad (USA)	82.5 kg
Clean & Jerk	Wang Xiufen (CHN)	117.5 kg	Izabela Dragneva (BUL)	105.0 kg	Robin Goad (USA)	100.0 kg
Total	Wang Xiufen (CHN)	210.0 kg	Izabela Dragneva (BUL)	192.5 kg	Robin Goad (USA)	182.5 kg

== Records ==
Prior to this competition, the existing world records were as follows.

World Record	Snatch	Chang Xixiang (CHN)	95.0 kg	Chongqing, China	17 September 1998
World Record	Clean & Jerk	Guo Huibing (CHN)	113.0 kg	Sofia, Bulgaria	19 May 1998
World Record	Total	Chang Xixiang (CHN)	207.5 kg	Chongqing, China	17 September 1998

== Results ==
Rank	Athlete	Body weight	Snatch (kg)				Clean & Jerk (kg)				Total
Rank	Athlete	Body weight	1	2	3	Rank	1	2	3	Rank	Total
1st place, gold medalist(s)	Wang Xiufen (CHN)	52.65	85.0	90.0	92.5	1st place, gold medalist(s)	110.0	115.0	117.5	1st place, gold medalist(s)	210.0
2nd place, silver medalist(s)	Izabela Dragneva (BUL)	52.21	82.5	87.5	~~90.0~~	2nd place, silver medalist(s)	105.0	~~115.0~~	—	2nd place, silver medalist(s)	192.5
3rd place, bronze medalist(s)	Robin Goad (USA)	52.73	80.0	82.5	~~85.0~~	3rd place, bronze medalist(s)	100.0	~~105.0~~	~~105.0~~	3rd place, bronze medalist(s)	182.5
4	Estefanía Juan (ESP)	52.58	67.5	70.0	72.5	7	90.0	95.0	97.5	4	170.0
5	Nancy Maneiro (VEN)	52.69	72.5	~~77.5~~	~~77.5~~	8	92.5	97.5	~~100.0~~	5	170.0
6	Dagmar Daneková (SVK)	52.49	~~72.5~~	72.5	~~75.0~~	5	92.5	~~95.0~~	~~97.5~~	6	165.0
7	Anna Stroubou (GRE)	52.51	67.5	70.0	72.5	6	85.0	87.5	~~90.0~~	7	160.0
8	Micol Dal Nevo (ITA)	52.65	65.0	~~70.0~~	~~70.0~~	12	85.0	~~87.5~~	87.5	8	152.5
9	Tarana Abbasova (AZE)	52.71	~~67.5~~	67.5	~~70.0~~	9	82.5	~~85.0~~	~~85.0~~	10	150.0
10	Maria Bohm (SWE)	52.79	67.5	~~72.5~~	~~72.5~~	10	82.5	~~85.0~~	~~85.0~~	11	150.0
11	Rabab Ashour (EGY)	52.08	60.0	62.5	~~65.0~~	14	77.5	82.5	~~85.0~~	9	145.0
12	Sabrin Kamel (EGY)	51.99	60.0	~~62.5~~	62.5	13	77.5	~~82.5~~	~~82.5~~	12	140.0
13	Michal Shahar (ISR)	52.39	60.0	~~65.0~~	65.0	11	70.0	75.0	~~80.0~~	13	140.0
—	Tyoni Batsiua (NRU)	52.81	60.0	~~65.0~~	~~65.0~~	15	~~80.0~~	—	—	—	—
—	Melanie Kosoff (USA)	52.99	77.5	~~80.0~~	~~80.0~~	4	~~107.5~~	~~107.5~~	~~107.5~~	—	—

== New records ==
Clean & Jerk	115.0 kg	Wang Xiufen (CHN)	WR
Clean & Jerk	117.5 kg	Wang Xiufen (CHN)	WR
Total	210.0 kg	Wang Xiufen (CHN)	WR
