= Wang Xiufen =

Chinese weightlifter (born 1974)

Personal information
- Nationality: China
- Born: 20 February 1974 (age 52)
- Weight: 52.99 kg (117 lb)

Sport
- Country: China
- Sport: Weightlifting
- Event: –53 kg
Medal record
Representing China
World Championships
| Gold medal – first place | 1998 Lahti | –53 kg |
| Bronze medal – third place | 1999 Athens | –53 kg |

Wang Xiufen (born 20 February 1974) is a former Chinese weightlifter, and world champion competing in the −53 kg division.

== Career ==
At the 1998 World Weightlifting Championships she won the gold medal in the 53 kg division while also setting 3 new senior world records in the Clean & Jerk and total.

== Major results ==
| Year | Venue | Weight | Snatch (kg) | | | | Clean & Jerk (kg) | | | | Total | Rank |
| Year | Venue | Weight | 1 | 2 | 3 | Rank | 1 | 2 | 3 | Rank | Total | Rank |
World Championships
| 1998 | Lahti, Finland | 53 kg | 85.0 | 90.0 | 92.5 | 1st place, gold medalist(s) | 110.0 | 115.0 WR | 117.5 WR | 1st place, gold medalist(s) | 210.0 WR | 1st place, gold medalist(s) |
| 1999 | Athens, Greece | 53 kg | ~~85.0~~ | 85.0 | ~~90.0~~ | 8 | 110.0 | 112.5 | ~~117.5~~ | 3rd place, bronze medalist(s) | 197.5 | 3rd place, bronze medalist(s) |
