= Maria Tatsi =

Greek weightlifter (born 1971)

Personal information
- Full name: Maria Tatsi
- Born: 25 June 1971 (age 55) Ioannina, Greece
- Height: 167 cm (5 ft 6 in)
- Weight: 67.80 kg (149.5 lb)

Sport
- Country: Greece
- Sport: Weightlifting
- Weight class: 69 kg
- Club: Spartakos, Ioannina (GRE)
- Team: National team
- Updated on 27 September 2016

Maria Tatsi (original name: Μαρία Τάτση, born 25 June 1971 in Ioannina) is a Greek female weightlifter, competing in the 69 kg category and representing Greece at international competitions.

She participated at the 2000 Summer Olympics in the 69 kg event. She competed at world championships, most recently at the 2001 World Weightlifting Championships.

== Major results ==
| Year | Venue | Weight | Snatch (kg) | | | | Clean & Jerk (kg) | | | | Total | Rank |
| Year | Venue | Weight | 1 | 2 | 3 | Rank | 1 | 2 | 3 | Rank | Total | Rank |
Summer Olympics
| 2000 | Sydney, Australia | 69 kg | | | | —N/a | | | | —N/a | | 11 |
World Championships
| 2001 | Antalya, Turkey | 69 kg | ~~95~~ | ~~95~~ | 95 | 9 | 125 | 130 | ~~132.5~~ | 4 | 225 | 5 |
| 1999 | Piraeus, Greece | 69 kg | 87.5 | ~~90~~ | ~~90~~ | 22 | 115 | 120 | 122.5 | 8 | 210 | 11 |
| 1998 | Lahti, Finland | 69 kg | ~~80~~ | 80 | ~~85~~ | 14 | 107.5 | ~~112.5~~ | 112.5 | 8 | 192.5 | 11 |
