= Winarni Binti Slamet =

Indonesian weightlifter (born 1975)

Personal information
- Full name: Winarni Binti Slamet
- Nationality: Indonesia
- Born: 19 December 1975 (age 50) Semarang, Central Java, Indonesia
- Height: 1.55 m (5 ft 1 in)
- Weight: 51 kg (112 lb)
Medal record
Women's weightlifting
Representing Indonesia
Olympic Games
Bronze medal – third place	2000 Sydney	53 kg
World Championships
Gold medal – first place	1997 Chiang Mai	50 kg
Silver medal – second place	1999 Athens	53 kg
SEA Games
Gold medal – first place	1997 Jakarta	50 kg

Winarni Binti Slamet (born December 19, 1975) is an Indonesian weightlifter who competed in the women's 53 kg at the 2000 Summer Olympics and won the bronze medal, lifting 202.5 kg in total. Also she won the World Championship in 1997.
