= Nagwan El-Zawawi =

Egyptian weightlifter

Personal information
- Full name: Nagwan Elzawawi
- Born: 17 January 1976 (age 50)
- Height: 170 cm (5 ft 7 in)
- Weight: 68.25 kg (150.5 lb)

Sport
- Country: Egypt
- Sport: Weightlifting
- Weight class: 69 kg
- Team: National team
- Updated on 4 October 2016

Nagwan Elzawawi (نجوان الزواوي, born 17 January 1976) was an Egyptian female weightlifter, competing in the 69 kg category and representing Egypt at international competitions. She is a weightlifting coach.

She participated at the 2000 Summer Olympics in the 69 kg event. She competed at world championships, including the 1998 World Weightlifting Championships.

She is a coach for the United Arab Emirates team.

== Major results ==
Year	Venue	Weight	Snatch (kg)				Clean & Jerk (kg)				Total	Rank
Year	Venue	Weight	1	2	3	Rank	1	2	3	Rank	Total	Rank
Summer Olympics
2000	Sydney, Australia	69 kg				—N/a				—N/a		DNF
World Championships
1998	Lahti, Finland	69 kg	85	~~90~~	90	8	~~110~~	~~110~~	~~110~~	---	0	---
