= Mahyaddin Abbasov =

- Born: c. 1910; Nukha (Sheki)
- Died: 1974; Sheki
- Other names: Pashazadeh, M.Pazhaohlu, Goran, Mubariz
- Occupation: Journalist
- Organization: Nukha fahlasi (Nukha labor)

Mahyaddin Abbasov (Azerbaijani: Məhyəddin Paşa oğlu Abbasov) was a celebrated journalist, writer and publicist in Soviet Azerbaijan, then part of the USSR.

Mahyaddin Abbasov was born in 1910 in Nukha into a labor family. He lost his parents during childhood and started to work as a laborer in the cocoon department of the Nukha silk factory.

He entered Azerbaijan State Pedagogical University in 1927. After graduating, he worked as a teacher first at different schools of Nukha, then at Nukha Pedagogical technical school. He participated in World War II, and in 1944 was wounded from splinters and lost function in his left arm and was released.

He worked as director of department at "Nukha fahlasi" ("Nukha labor") newspaper in 1944, became the chief editor in 1945 and worked there till the end of his life.

Gulustan a poem of Bakhtiyar Vahabzadeh was published in "Nukha fahlasi" newspaper for the first time during Mahyaddin Abbasov's tenure.

Mahyaddin Abbasov was awarded as an Honoured Culture worker of the Republic in 1971 (Honoured journalist name did not exist at that time).

Publicistic articles and short satirical stories were the main part of M. Abbasov's activities. He wrote under the pseudonym "Pashazade" in the pages of newspaper he was controlled.

Along with his editorial activities M. Abbasov continued writing his pedagogical works and worked as a physics teacher at school №10 named by M. Qorki (R.B. Afandiyev nowadays).

M. Abbasov died on 28 December 1974. Before his funeral, his corpse was put in the meeting hall of the city department and there was a very crowded farewell ceremony.
