= Zhang Xiangxiang =

Chinese weightlifter (born 1983)

Personal information
- Born: July 16, 1983 (age 42)
Medal record
Men's Weightlifting
Representing China
Olympic Games
Bronze medal – third place	2000 Sydney	– 56 kg
Gold medal – first place	2008 Beijing	– 62 kg
Asian Championships
Silver medal – second place	2000 Osaka	– 56 kg
East Asian Games
Gold medal – first place	2005 Macau	– 62 kg
Junior World Championships
Gold medal – first place	2002 Havirov	– 62 kg
National Games of China
Gold medal – first place	2001 Guangdong	– 56 kg

Zhang Xiangxiang (Chinese: 张湘祥, born July 16, 1983, in Longyan, Fujian) is a retired male Chinese weightlifter. He won the bronze medal in the 56 kg class at the 2000 Olympics in Sydney. Zhang later won the gold medal in the 62 kg class at the 2008 Olympics in Beijing.

== See also ==
- China at the 2008 Summer Olympics
