= Ashraf Abbasov =

Soviet composer (1920-1992)

Ashraf Abbasov Azerbaijani: Əşrəf Abbasov
- Born: Əşrəf Cəlal oğlu Abbasov; March 23, 1920; Shusha, Azerbaijan Democratic Republic
- Origin: Azerbaijani
- Died: February 8, 1992 (aged 71) Baku, Azerbaijan
- Occupation: composer
- Awards: People's Artist of the Azerbaijan SSR Honored Art Worker of the Azerbaijan SSR

Ashraf Jalal oghlu Abbasov (Azerbaijani: Əşrəf Cəlal oğlu Abbasov, 23 March 1920–8 February 1992) was an Azerbaijani composer, professor, Honored Art Worker of the Azerbaijan SSR, People's Artist of the Azerbaijan SSR.

== Biography ==
Ashraf Abbasov was born on March 23, 1920, in Shusha in a poor and large family. After completing classes in 7-year secondary school, he entered the Shusha pedagogical workers faculty and at the same time studied at a music school in the class of Hamza Aliyev, a tar teacher. In 1936, Ashraf came to Baku and was admitted to the composition class of Azerbaijan National Conservatory Music College. He was also included in the orchestra of folk instruments under the direction of famous composer and conductor Said Rustamov to participate in the Decade of Azerbaijani Literature and Art in Moscow during this period.

He was drafted into the Red Army in December 1939. In the army, he was a musician in the military brass band of 345th rifle regiment, stationed in Belarus. At the beginning of the Great Patriotic War, sergeant Ashraf Abbasov was seriously wounded near the town of Yelnya.

He remained in Tomsk military hospital for several months. Ashraf Abbasov was discharged due to illness, went to his family in Shusha and continued his treatment at home for two years. In Shusha, he started to work as a teacher at a local music school. He soon returned to Baku and continued his education at Azerbaijan State Conservatory, where the professors Boris Zeidman and Uzeyir Hajibeyov taught. He graduated in 1948.

Abbasov entered the graduate school at Moscow State Tchaikovsky Conservatory. He defended his dissertation under the guidance of Mikhail Chulaki in 1952 and became the first Azerbaijani composer to receive an academic degree. After that, he came to Baku and worked as an associate professor at the Department of Composition at Azerbaijan State Conservatory. During these years, he headed a music school in Shusha, and for many years Asaf Zeynally Music School in Baku.

He worked as the rector of the conservatory for four years (1953–1957) and headed the composition department for 15 years (1957-1972). Member of the CPSU since 1946. In 1968, Ashraf Abbasov was given the rank of professor.

Ashraf Abbasov died on February 8, 1992, in Baku.

== Awards ==
- Honored Art Worker of the Azerbaijan SSR — 18 May 1963
- People's Artist of the Azerbaijan SSR — 14 June 1990
- The II degree Order of the Patriotic War — 11 March 1985
- Order of the Badge of Honour — 9 June 1959

== Works ==
Orchestral works:

- "Kurdu"
- "Dance of the Red Fighters"
- "Dance of Youth"
- "Dance Suite"
- "Shusha" (symphonic poem) (1945)
- Concerto for piano and orchestra (1946)
- Cantata for soloists, chorus and symphony orchestra (1948)
- "Dramatic Poem" (1953)
- "Concertina"
- "The Day Will Come" (symphonic poem) (1952)
- "Ethiopian sketches"

Songs:

- "For our Motherland"
- "Forward"

Chamber vocal and instrumental compositions:

- "Youth, forward"
- "Jeyranbatan"
- "Beauty of the fields"
- Variations for Violin and Piano
- Cello Sonata

Ballet:

- "Gypsy girl" (1965) was staged at Azerbaijan State Academic Opera and Ballet Theater. Azerbaijan's first children's ballet.

Operettas:

- "You Can't Be Mine" (1963)
- "In the arms of the mountains" (1970)
- "My yard is my life"

Music for the performances of Azerbaijan State Theatre of Young Spectators:

- “At the beginning of May” (V.A.Lyubimova), 1946
- "Fitne" (Abdulla Shaig), 1946
- "Kingdom of Flowers" (Azimzade), 1948

Literary works:

- "Uzeyir Hajibeyov and his opera "Koroghlu". Baku, 1950"
