= Irina Kasimova =

Russian weightlifter

Personal information
- Full name: Irina Nikolayevna Kasimova
- Born: 1 January 1971 (age 55) Quaraghandy, Russia
- Height: 168 cm (5 ft 6 in)
- Weight: 68.92 kg (151.9 lb)

Sport
- Country: Russia
- Sport: Weightlifting
- Weight class: 69 kg
- Club: Ministry of Defense Sports Club
- Team: National team
- Updated on 28 September 2016

Irina Nikolayevna Kassimova (original name: Ирина Николаевна Касимова; born 1 January 1971 in Quaraghandy) is a Russian female weightlifter, competing in the 69 kg category and representing Russia at international competitions.

She participated at the 2000 Summer Olympics in the 69 kg event. She competed at world championships, most recently at the 1999 World Weightlifting Championships.

== Major results ==
Year	Venue	Weight	Snatch (kg)				Clean & Jerk (kg)				Total	Rank
Year	Venue	Weight	1	2	3	Rank	1	2	3	Rank	Total	Rank
Summer Olympics
2000	Sydney, Australia	69 kg				—N/a				—N/a		6
World Championships
1999	Piraeus, Greece	69 kg	~~97.5~~	97.5	~~102.5~~	11	130	~~137.5~~	~~137.5~~	2nd place, silver medalist(s)	227.5	5
1998	Lahti, Finland	69 kg	~~95~~	95	97.5	4	125	127.5	~~132.5~~	3rd place, bronze medalist(s)	225	3rd place, bronze medalist(s)
