= Kim Soon-hee =

South Korean weightlifter (born 1977)

Personal information
- Full name: Kim Soon-hee
- Born: 21 February 1977 (age 49) Hanam, South Korea
- Height: 165 cm (5 ft 5 in)
- Weight: 74.54 kg (164.3 lb)

Sport
- Country: South Korea
- Sport: Weightlifting
- Weight class: 75 kg
- Club: Gyeonggi
- Team: National team
- Updated on 11 September 2016

Kim Soon-hee (Korean: 김순희, born 21 February 1977 in Hanam), also spelled Kim Sun-hui, is a South Korean weightlifter, competing in the 75 kg category and representing South Korea at international competitions.

She participated at the 2000 Summer Olympics in the 75 kg event, finishing fourth and at the 2004 Summer Olympics in the 75 kg event, finishing seventh. She competed at world championships, most recently at the 2006 World Weightlifting Championships.

== Major results ==
Year	Venue	Weight	Snatch (kg)				Clean & jerk (kg)				Total	Rank
Year	Venue	Weight	1	2	3	Rank	1	2	3	Rank	Total	Rank
Summer Olympics
2004	Athens, Greece	75 kg				—N/a				—N/a		7
2000	Sydney, Australia	75 kg				—N/a				—N/a		4
World Championships
2006	Santo Domingo, Dominican Republic	75 kg	105	~~110~~	110	6	133	~~141~~	~~141~~	5	243.0	4
2003	Vancouver, Canada	75 kg	~~105~~	105	~~110~~	11	135	~~140~~	~~142.5~~	4	240	7
1999	Piraeus, Greece	75 kg	100	105	107.5	2nd place, silver medalist(s)	130	~~135~~	135	1st place, gold medalist(s)	242.5	2nd place, silver medalist(s)
1997												
