= Swe Swe Win =

Burmese weightlifter (born 1975)

Personal information
- Full name: Swe Swe Win
- Born: 3 December 1975 (age 50)
- Weight: 51.55 kg (113.6 lb)

Sport
- Country: Myanmar
- Sport: Weightlifting
- Weight class: 53 kg
- Team: National team
- Updated on 28 September 2016

Swe Swe Win (born 3 December 1975) was a Burmese female weightlifter, competing in the 53 kg category and representing Myanmar at international competitions.

She competed at world championships, most recently at the 1999 World Weightlifting Championships, and the 2000 Summer Olympics.

== Major results ==
| Year | Venue | Weight | Snatch (kg) | | | | Clean & Jerk (kg) | | | | Total | Rank |
| Year | Venue | Weight | 1 | 2 | 3 | Rank | 1 | 2 | 3 | Rank | Total | Rank |
World Championships
| 1999 | Piraeus, Greece | 53 kg | 80 | 85 | ~~87.5~~ | 3rd place, bronze medalist(s) | 105 | ~~110~~ | ~~110~~ | 6 | 190 | 6 |
