= Lin Weining =

Chinese weightlifter (born 1979)

Medal record

Women's Weightlifting

Olympic Games
Gold medal – first place	2000 Sydney	69 kg

Lin Weining (Chinese: 林伟宁; born March 15, 1979, in Changyi County, Shandong) is a Chinese weightlifter. She began with wushu in 1991, and switched to weightlifting in 1992. She joined the provincial weightlifting team four years later.

== Major performances ==
- 1999 National Championships - 2nd 69 kg
- 1999 World Women's Youth Championships - 1st 69 kg snatch, C&J & total, breaking WR in snatch (137.5 kg)
- 1999 Asian Championships - 1st 69 kg snatch, C&J & total, breaking WRs in C&J (142.5 kg) and total (252.5 kg)
- 2000 National Championships - 2nd 69 kg total (252.5 kg)
- 2000 Sydney Olympic Games - 1st 69 kg
