= Ruth Ogbeifo =

Nigerian weightlifter

Personal information
- Born: 18 April 1972 (age 54)
Medal record
Women's Weightlifting
Representing Nigeria
Olympic Games
Silver medal – second place	2000 Sydney	– 75 kg
World Championships
Bronze medal – third place	1999 Athens	– 75 kg

Ruth Ogbeifo (born 18 April 1972) is a Nigerian weightlifter.

At the 1999 World Championships in the 75 kg category she won bronze medals in snatch, clean and jerk, and overall.

She competed in the 75 kg weight class at the 2000 Summer Olympics and won the silver medal, with 245.0 kg in total.
