= Erzsébet Márkus =

Hungarian weightlifter (born 1969)

Personal information
- Full name: Erzsébet Márkus-Peresztegi
- Born: August 23, 1969 (age 57)
Medal record
Women's weightlifting
Representing Hungary
Olympic Games
Silver medal – second place	2000 Sydney	– 69 kg
World Championships
Bronze medal – third place	1999 Athens	– 69 kg
European Championships
Gold medal – first place	1998 Riesa	– 69 kg
Silver medal – second place	1997 Rijeka	– 64 kg

Erzsébet Márkus-Peresztegi (born August 23, 1969, in Sopron, Győr-Moson-Sopron) is a retired female weightlifter from Hungary. She became an Olympic medalist during the 2000 Summer Olympics when she won the silver medal in the women's – 69 kg class.
