= Li Feng-ying =

Taiwanese weightlifter (born 1975)

Olympic medal record

Women's Weightlifting
Silver medal – second place	2000 Sydney	Women's Featherweight

Li Fengying (also written as Li Feng-ying) (born January 23, 1975) is a female weightlifter who competed for Chinese Taipei in the 2000 Summer Olympics and won a silver medal in featherweight category. She lifted a total of 212.5 kg (snatch – 98 kg, clean & jerk – 115 kg) at bodyweight of 53 kg.
