= Aphinya Pharksupho =

Thai weightlifter

Personal information
- Nationality: Thai
- Born: 25 December 1976 (age 49)

Sport
- Sport: Weightlifting

Aphinya Pharksupho (born 25 December 1976) is a Thai weightlifter. Among her achievements is a tenth place in 69 kg at the 2000 Summer Olympics in Sydney.
