= Kuo Yi-hang =

Taiwanese weightlifter (born 1975)

Kuo Yi-Hang
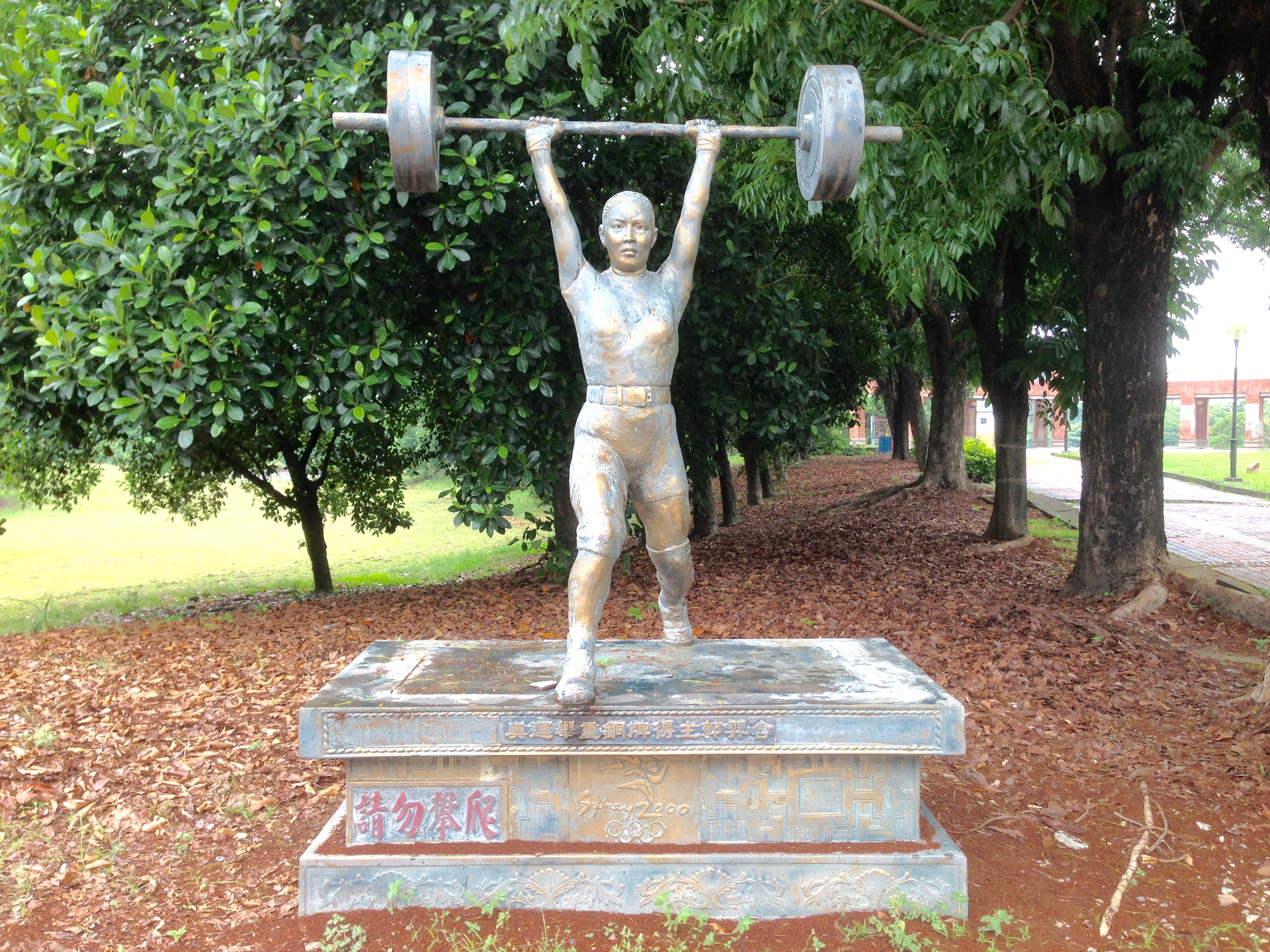

Personal information
- Native name: 郭羿含
- Born: 郭淑芬; June 2, 1975 (age 51) Changzhi, Pingtung, Taiwan
Medal record
Women's Weightlifting
Bronze medal – third place	2000 Sydney	Women's Heavyweight

Kuo Yi-hang (born 2 June 1975) formerly Kuo Shu-fen is a female weightlifter who competed for Chinese Taipei in the 2000 Summer Olympics and won a bronze medal in heavyweight category. She lifted a total of 245 kg (snatch - 107.5 kg, clean & jerk - 137.5 kg) at bodyweight of 75 kg.

== Personal life ==
Kuo Yi-Hang was born in 1964 in Changzhi, Pingtung, in southern Taiwan to parents Guo Wan-Fu and Pan Jin-lian. She is the second in a family of five.
