= Weightlifting at the 2000 Summer Olympics =

Weightlifting at the Games of the XXVII Olympiad
- Venue: Sydney Convention and Exhibition Centre
- Dates: 16–26 September 2000
- No. of events: 15
- Competitors: 246 from 76 nations

The Weightlifting Competition at the 2000 Summer Olympics in Sydney, Australia, saw the introduction of women's weightlifting.

== Medalists ==
=== Men ===
Event	Gold	Silver	Bronze
56 kg^{[a]}	Halil Mutlu; Turkey	Wu Wenxiong; China	Zhang Xiangxiang; China
62 kg^{[b]}	Nikolaj Pešalov; Croatia	Leonidas Sabanis; Greece	Henadzi Aliashchuk; Belarus
69 kg	Galabin Boevski; Bulgaria	Georgi Markov; Bulgaria	Siarhei Laurenau; Belarus
77 kg	Zhan Xugang; China	Viktor Mitrou; Greece	Arsen Melikyan; Armenia
85 kg	Pyrros Dimas; Greece	Marc Huster; Germany	Giorgi Asanidze; Georgia
94 kg	Akakios Kakiasvilis; Greece	Szymon Kołecki; Poland	Aleksey Petrov; Russia
105 kg	Hossein Tavakkoli; Iran	Alan Tsagaev; Bulgaria	Said Saif Asaad; Qatar
+105 kg^{[c]}	Hossein Rezazadeh; Iran	Ronny Weller; Germany	Andrey Chemerkin; Russia

=== Women ===
Event	Gold	Silver	Bronze
48 kg^{[d]}	Tara Nott; United States	Raema Lisa Rumbewas; Indonesia	Sri Indriyani; Indonesia
53 kg	Yang Xia; China	Li Feng-ying; Chinese Taipei	Winarni Binti Slamet; Indonesia
58 kg	Soraya Jiménez; Mexico	Ri Song-hui; North Korea	Khassaraporn Suta; Thailand
63 kg	Chen Xiaomin; China	Valentina Popova; Russia	Ioanna Chatziioannou; Greece
69 kg	Lin Weining; China	Erzsébet Márkus; Hungary	Karnam Malleswari; India
75 kg	María Isabel Urrutia; Colombia	Ruth Ogbeifo; Nigeria	Kuo Yi-hang; Chinese Taipei
+75 kg	Ding Meiyuan; China	Agata Wróbel; Poland	Cheryl Haworth; United States

== Notes ==
- ^{a} Ivan Ivanov of Bulgaria originally won the silver medal, but was disqualified after testing positive for furosemide.
- ^{b} Sevdalin Minchev of Bulgaria originally won the bronze medal, but was disqualified after testing positive for furosemide.
- ^{c} Ashot Danielyan of Armenia originally won the bronze medal, but was disqualified after testing positive for stanozolol.
- ^{d} Izabela Dragneva of Bulgaria originally won the gold medal, but was disqualified after testing positive for furosemide.

== Medal table ==
Rank	Nation	Gold	Silver	Bronze	Total
1	China	5	1	1	7
2	Greece	2	2	1	5
3	Iran	2	0	0	2
4	Bulgaria	1	2	0	3
5	United States	1	0	1	2
6	Colombia	1	0	0	1
6	Croatia	1	0	0	1
6	Mexico	1	0	0	1
6	Turkey	1	0	0	1
10	Germany	0	2	0	2
10	Poland	0	2	0	2
12	Indonesia	0	1	2	3
12	Russia	0	1	2	3
14	Chinese Taipei	0	1	1	2
15	Hungary	0	1	0	1
15	Nigeria	0	1	0	1
15	North Korea	0	1	0	1
18	Belarus	0	0	2	2
19	Armenia	0	0	1	1
19	Georgia	0	0	1	1
19	India	0	0	1	1
19	Qatar	0	0	1	1
19	Thailand	0	0	1	1
Totals (23 entries)		15	15	15	45

== Participating nations ==
A total number of 261 weightlifters from 73 nations competed at the Sydney Games:

- Albania (1)
- Algeria (1)
- American Samoa (1)
- Argentina (2)
- Armenia (6)
- Australia (12)
- Azerbaijan (2)
- Belgium (2)
- Belarus (5)
- Brazil (1)
- Bulgaria (12)
- Canada (2)
- Czech Republic (1)
- China (12)
- Chinese Taipei (4)
- Colombia (3)
- Croatia (1)
- Cuba (5)
- Dominican Republic (2)
- Ecuador (1)
- Egypt (2)
- El Salvador (1)
- Federated States of Micronesia (1)
- Fiji (1)
- Finland (1)
- France (3)
- Georgia (3)
- Germany (6)
- Great Britain (1)
- Greece (10)
- Guam (1)
- Guatemala (1)
- India (3)
- Indonesia (3)
- Iran (6)
- Italy (4)
- Japan (8)
- Kazakhstan (6)
- Kyrgyzstan (2)
- Latvia (3)
- Lebanon (1)
- Lithuania (1)
- Mexico (1)
- Moldova (3)
- Myanmar (3)
- Nauru (2)
- Nicaragua (1)
- Nigeria (5)
- North Korea (4)
- Norway (1)
- New Zealand (2)
- Palau (1)
- Panama (1)
- Papua New Guinea (1)
- Poland (9)
- Puerto Rico (2)
- Qatar (5)
- Romania (7)
- Russia (9)
- Samoa (1)
- Seychelles (1)
- Slovakia (1)
- South Korea (8)
- Spain (3)
- Thailand (5)
- Tonga (1)
- Tunisia (1)
- Turkey (8)
- Turkmenistan (1)
- Ukraine (10)
- United States (6)
- Uzbekistan (2)
- Venezuela (2)

== Sources ==
- "Olympic Medal Winners". International Olympic Committee.
