= 1999 World Weightlifting Championships =

International weightlifting competition

1999 World Championships
- Host city: Piraeus, Greece
- Dates: 21–28 November
- Main venue: Peace and Friendship Stadium

The 1999 World Weightlifting Championships were held at Peace and Friendship Stadium in Piraeus, Athens, Greece from November 21 to November 28, 1999.

It was the main qualifying events in the sport for the 2000 Summer Olympics in Sydney, Australia.

== Medal summary ==
=== Men ===
| Event | Gold | | Silver | | Bronze | |
56 kg
| Snatch | Halil Mutlu; Turkey | 137.5 kg WR | Sergio Álvarez; Cuba | 125.0 kg | Adrian Jigău; Romania | 125.0 kg |
| Clean & Jerk | Halil Mutlu; Turkey | 166.0 kg WR | Wang Shin-yuan; Chinese Taipei | 157.5 kg | Ivan Ivanov; Bulgaria | 157.5 kg |
| Total | Halil Mutlu; Turkey | 302.5 kg WR | Adrian Jigău; Romania | 282.5 kg | Wang Shin-yuan; Chinese Taipei | 280.0 kg |
62 kg
| Snatch | Shi Zhiyong; China | 147.5 kg | Leonidas Sabanis; Greece | 145.0 kg | Sevdalin Minchev; Bulgaria | 142.5 kg |
| Clean & Jerk | Le Maosheng; China | 180.5 kg WR | Marcus Stephen; Nauru | 172.5 kg | Sevdalin Minchev; Bulgaria | 172.5 kg |
| Total | Le Maosheng; China | 320.0 kg | Leonidas Sabanis; Greece | 315.0 kg | Sevdalin Minchev; Bulgaria | 315.0 kg |
69 kg
| Snatch | Galabin Boevski; Bulgaria | 162.5 kg WR | Georgios Tzelilis; Greece | 155.0 kg | Valerios Leonidis; Greece | 152.5 kg |
| Clean & Jerk | Galabin Boevski; Bulgaria | 196.0 kg WR | Georgios Tzelilis; Greece | 190.0 kg | Valerios Leonidis; Greece | 187.5 kg |
| Total | Galabin Boevski; Bulgaria | 357.5 kg WR | Georgios Tzelilis; Greece | 345.0 kg | Valerios Leonidis; Greece | 340.0 kg |
77 kg
| Snatch | Khachatur Kyapanaktsyan; Armenia | 170.5 kg WR | Plamen Zhelyazkov; Bulgaria | 170.0 kg | Badr Salem Nayef; Qatar | 165.0 kg |
| Clean & Jerk | Badr Salem Nayef; Qatar | 205.0 kg | Viktor Mitrou; Greece | 205.0 kg | Nader Sufyan Abbas; Qatar | 202.5 kg |
| Total | Badr Salem Nayef; Qatar | 370.0 kg | Viktor Mitrou; Greece | 370.0 kg | Plamen Zhelyazkov; Bulgaria | 370.0 kg |
85 kg
| Snatch | Pyrros Dimas; Greece | 180.5 kg WR | Giorgi Asanidze; Georgia | 177.5 kg | Marc Huster; Germany | 177.5 kg |
| Clean & Jerk | Shahin Nassirinia; Iran | 215.0 kg | Christos Spyrou; Greece | 207.5 kg | Pyrros Dimas; Greece | 207.5 kg |
| Total | Shahin Nassirinia; Iran | 390.0 kg | Pyrros Dimas; Greece | 387.5 kg | Marc Huster; Germany | 382.5 kg |
94 kg
| Snatch | Akakios Kakiasvilis; Greece | 188.0 kg WR | Leonidas Kokas; Greece | 185.0 kg | Hakob Pilosyan; Armenia | 182.5 kg |
| Clean & Jerk | Akakios Kakiasvilis; Greece | 225.0 kg | Szymon Kołecki; Poland | 225.0 kg | Bünyamin Sudaş; Turkey | 220.0 kg |
| Total | Akakios Kakiasvilis; Greece | 412.5 kg | Szymon Kołecki; Poland | 405.0 kg | Leonidas Kokas; Greece | 402.5 kg |
105 kg
| Snatch | Denys Hotfrid; Ukraine | 195.0 kg | Choi Jong-kun; South Korea | 190.0 kg | Evgeny Shishlyannikov; Russia | 190.0 kg |
| Clean & Jerk | Evgeny Shishlyannikov; Russia | 235.0 kg | Denys Hotfrid; Ukraine | 235.0 kg | Robert Dołęga; Poland | 225.0 kg |
| Total | Denys Hotfrid; Ukraine | 430.0 kg | Evgeny Shishlyannikov; Russia | 425.0 kg | Choi Jong-kun; South Korea | 410.0 kg |
+105 kg
| Snatch | Jaber Saeed Salem; Qatar | 205.0 kg | Hossein Rezazadeh; Iran | 206.0 kg WR | Viktors Ščerbatihs; Latvia | 200.0 kg |
| Clean & Jerk | Andrey Chemerkin; Russia | 257.5 kg | Kim Tae-hyun; South Korea | 252.5 kg | Jaber Saeed Salem; Qatar | 250.0 kg |
| Total | Andrey Chemerkin; Russia | 457.5 kg | Jaber Saeed Salem; Qatar | 455.0 kg | Hossein Rezazadeh; Iran | 447.5 kg |

=== Women ===
| Event | Gold | | Silver | | Bronze | |
48 kg
| Snatch | Sri Indriyani; Indonesia | 82.5 kg | Li Xuezhao; China | 80.0 kg | Chu Nan-mei; Chinese Taipei | 80.0 kg |
| Clean & Jerk | Donka Mincheva; Bulgaria | 113.5 kg WR | Kunjarani Devi; India | 105.0 kg | Kaori Niyanagi; Japan | 105.0 kg |
| Total | Donka Mincheva; Bulgaria | 192.5 kg | Sri Indriyani; Indonesia | 185.0 kg | Kaori Niyanagi; Japan | 185.0 kg |
53 kg
| Snatch | Li Feng-ying; Chinese Taipei | 95.0 kg | Winarni Binti Slamet; Indonesia | 90.0 kg | Swe Swe Win; Myanmar | 85.0 kg |
| Clean & Jerk | Li Feng-ying; Chinese Taipei | 121.5 kg WR | Winarni Binti Slamet; Indonesia | 112.5 kg | Wang Xiufen; China | 112.5 kg |
| Total | Li Feng-ying; Chinese Taipei | 215.0 kg | Winarni Binti Slamet; Indonesia | 202.5 kg | Wang Xiufen; China | 197.5 kg |
58 kg
| Snatch | Chen Yanqing; China | 105.5 kg WR | Ri Song-hui; North Korea | 100.0 kg | Kuo Ping-chun; Chinese Taipei | 97.5 kg |
| Clean & Jerk | Ri Song-hui; North Korea | 131.0 kg WR | Chen Yanqing; China | 130.0 kg | Kuo Ping-chun; Chinese Taipei | 125.0 kg |
| Total | Chen Yanqing; China | 235.0 kg WR | Ri Song-hui; North Korea | 230.0 kg | Kuo Ping-chun; Chinese Taipei | 222.5 kg |
63 kg
| Snatch | Chen Jui-lien; Chinese Taipei | 107.5 kg | Valentina Popova; Russia | 105.0 kg | Xiong Meiying; China | 105.0 kg |
| Clean & Jerk | Chen Jui-lien; Chinese Taipei | 132.5 kg | Xiong Meiying; China | 132.5 kg WR | Ioanna Chatziioannou; Greece | 127.5 kg |
| Total | Chen Jui-lien; Chinese Taipei | 240.0 kg WR | Xiong Meiying; China | 237.5 kg | Valentina Popova; Russia | 232.5 kg |
69 kg
| Snatch | Erzsébet Márkus; Hungary | 107.5 kg | Milena Trendafilova; Bulgaria | 105.0 kg | Sun Tianni; China | 105.0 kg |
| Clean & Jerk | Sun Tianni; China | 143.0 kg WR | Irina Kasimova; Russia | 130.0 kg | Milena Trendafilova; Bulgaria | 127.5 kg |
| Total | Sun Tianni; China | 247.5 kg | Milena Trendafilova; Bulgaria | 232.5 kg | Erzsébet Márkus; Hungary | 232.5 kg |
75 kg
| Snatch | Xu Jiao; China | 112.5 kg | Kim Soon-hee; South Korea | 107.5 kg | Ruth Ogbeifo; Nigeria | 107.5 kg |
| Clean & Jerk | Kim Soon-hee; South Korea | 135.0 kg | Xu Jiao; China | 135.0 kg | Ruth Ogbeifo; Nigeria | 132.5 kg |
| Total | Xu Jiao; China | 247.5 kg | Kim Soon-hee; South Korea | 242.5 kg | Ruth Ogbeifo; Nigeria | 240.0 kg |
+75 kg
| Snatch | Ding Meiyuan; China | 127.5 kg | Agata Wróbel; Poland | 127.5 kg WR | Cheryl Haworth; United States | 115.0 kg |
| Clean & Jerk | Ding Meiyuan; China | 157.5 kg WR | Agata Wróbel; Poland | 152.5 kg | Chen Hsiao-lien; Chinese Taipei | 142.5 kg |
| Total | Ding Meiyuan; China | 285.0 kg WR | Agata Wróbel; Poland | 280.0 kg | Balkisu Musa; Nigeria | 252.5 kg |

== Medal table ==
Ranking by Big (Total result) medals

| Rank | Nation | Gold | Silver | Bronze | Total |
|---|---|---|---|---|---|
| 1 | China | 5 | 1 | 1 | 7 |
| 2 | Bulgaria | 2 | 1 | 2 | 5 |
| 3 | Chinese Taipei | 2 | 0 | 2 | 4 |
| 4 | Greece | 1 | 4 | 2 | 7 |
| 5 | Russia | 1 | 1 | 1 | 3 |
| 6 | Qatar | 1 | 1 | 0 | 2 |
| 7 | Iran | 1 | 0 | 1 | 2 |
| 8 | Turkey | 1 | 0 | 0 | 1 |
| 8 | Ukraine | 1 | 0 | 0 | 1 |
| 10 | Indonesia | 0 | 2 | 0 | 2 |
| 10 | Poland | 0 | 2 | 0 | 2 |
| 12 | South Korea | 0 | 1 | 1 | 2 |
| 13 | North Korea | 0 | 1 | 0 | 1 |
| 13 | Romania | 0 | 1 | 0 | 1 |
| 15 | Nigeria | 0 | 0 | 2 | 2 |
| 16 | Germany | 0 | 0 | 1 | 1 |
| 16 | Hungary | 0 | 0 | 1 | 1 |
| 16 | Japan | 0 | 0 | 1 | 1 |
| Totals (18 entries) | | 15 | 15 | 15 | 45 |

Ranking by all medals: Big (Total result) and Small (Snatch and Clean & Jerk)

| Rank | Nation | Gold | Silver | Bronze | Total |
|---|---|---|---|---|---|
| 1 | China | 12 | 5 | 4 | 21 |
| 2 | Chinese Taipei | 6 | 1 | 6 | 13 |
| 3 | Bulgaria | 5 | 3 | 6 | 14 |
| 4 | Greece | 4 | 10 | 6 | 20 |
| 5 | Russia | 3 | 3 | 2 | 8 |
| 6 | Qatar | 3 | 1 | 3 | 7 |
| 7 | Turkey | 3 | 0 | 1 | 4 |
| 8 | Iran | 2 | 1 | 1 | 4 |
| 9 | Ukraine | 2 | 1 | 0 | 3 |
| 10 | South Korea | 1 | 4 | 1 | 6 |
| 11 | Indonesia | 1 | 4 | 0 | 5 |
| 12 | North Korea | 1 | 2 | 0 | 3 |
| 13 | Armenia | 1 | 0 | 1 | 2 |
| 13 | Hungary | 1 | 0 | 1 | 2 |
| 15 | Poland | 0 | 5 | 1 | 6 |
| 16 | Romania | 0 | 1 | 1 | 2 |
| 17 | Cuba | 0 | 1 | 0 | 1 |
| 17 | Georgia | 0 | 1 | 0 | 1 |
| 17 | India | 0 | 1 | 0 | 1 |
| 17 | Nauru | 0 | 1 | 0 | 1 |
| 21 | Nigeria | 0 | 0 | 4 | 4 |
| 22 | Germany | 0 | 0 | 2 | 2 |
| 22 | Japan | 0 | 0 | 2 | 2 |
| 24 | Latvia | 0 | 0 | 1 | 1 |
| 24 | Myanmar | 0 | 0 | 1 | 1 |
| 24 | United States | 0 | 0 | 1 | 1 |
| Totals (26 entries) | | 45 | 45 | 45 | 135 |

== Team ranking ==
=== Men ===
| Rank | Team | Points |
|---|---|---|
| 1 | Greece | 581 |
| 2 | Bulgaria | 465 |
| 3 | China | 437 |
| 4 | Turkey | 386 |
| 5 | Poland | 377 |
| 6 | Ukraine | 364 |

=== Women ===
| Rank | Team | Points |
|---|---|---|
| 1 | China | 530 |
| 2 | Chinese Taipei | 392 |
| 3 | Bulgaria | 374 |
| 4 | Thailand | 371 |
| 5 | Nigeria | 366 |
| 6 | United States | 333 |

== Participating nations ==
626 competitors from 87 nations competed.

- Albania (7)
- Algeria (6)
- Argentina (2)
- Armenia (8)
- Australia (12)
- Austria (5)
- Azerbaijan (10)
- Belarus (7)
- Belgium (3)
- Brazil (1)
- Bulgaria (15)
- Cameroon (5)
- Canada (15)
- Chile (1)
- China (15)
- Chinese Taipei (14)
- Colombia (14)
- Croatia (2)
- Cuba (7)
- Cyprus (1)
- Czech Republic (4)
- Denmark (15)
- Dominican Republic (7)
- Ecuador (2)
- Egypt (8)
- El Salvador (3)
- Federated States of Micronesia (1)
- Fiji (1)
- Finland (14)
- France (15)
- Georgia (6)
- Germany (11)
- Great Britain (10)
- Greece (15)
- Guatemala (5)
- Hungary (15)
- India (8)
- Indonesia (5)
- Iran (8)
- Iraq (3)
- Ireland (5)
- Israel (11)
- Italy (15)
- Japan (15)
- Kazakhstan (15)
- Kyrgyzstan (5)
- Latvia (8)
- Lebanon (2)
- Libya (1)
- Lithuania (7)
- Mauritius (1)
- Mexico (7)
- Moldova (6)
- Mongolia (1)
- Myanmar (5)
- Nauru (7)
- Netherlands (12)
- New Zealand (3)
- Nigeria (10)
- North Korea (2)
- Norway (4)
- Panama (1)
- Poland (15)
- Portugal (7)
- Puerto Rico (3)
- Qatar (8)
- Romania (8)
- Russia (14)
- Samoa (2)
- San Marino (1)
- Saudi Arabia (1)
- Slovakia (13)
- South Africa (2)
- South Korea (13)
- Spain (14)
- Sweden (4)
- Switzerland (5)
- Syria (4)
- Thailand (7)
- Tunisia (4)
- Turkey (8)
- Turkmenistan (3)
- Ukraine (15)
- United States (15)
- Uruguay (1)
- Uzbekistan (4)
- Venezuela (6)
