= Deaths in January 1992 =

The following is a list of notable deaths in January 1992.

Entries for each day are listed alphabetically by surname. A typical entry lists information in the following sequence:

- Name, age, country of citizenship at birth, subsequent country of citizenship (if applicable), reason for notability, cause of death (if known), and reference.

== January 1992 ==
=== 1 ===
- Cele Abba, 85, Italian actress.
- Konrad Bleuler, 79, Swiss quantum physicist.
- Jack Badham, 72, English football player.
- James W. B. Douglas, 78, British social researcher.
- M. J. Frankovich, 82, American film producer, pneumonia.
- Grace Hopper, 85, American naval admiral and computer scientist.
- Oskar Munzel, 92, Germany Wehrmacht general during World War II.
- Alf Nielsen, 83, Norwegian footballer.
- Buck Stanton, 85, American baseball player (St. Louis Browns).

=== 2 ===
- Julien Beke, 77, Belgian Olympic wrestler (1936).
- Kenneth Emory, 94, American anthropologist.
- Virginia Field, 74, British-born American actress, cancer.
- Morgan Ford, 80, American judge.
- Tibor Gallai, 79, Hungarian mathematician.
- Hedwig Haß, 89, German Olympic fencer (1936).
- Hans Kurath, 100, Austrian-American linguist.
- Ginette Leclerc, 79, French actress, cancer.
- Maurice Perrin, 80, French Olympic cyclist (1932).
- Yaúca, 56, Portuguese football player.

=== 3 ===
- O. V. Alagesan, 80, Indian politician and freedom fighter.
- Dame Judith Anderson, 94, Australian actress, pneumonia.
- Robert Gordis, 83, American conservative rabbi.
- Akio Kashiwagi, 53-54, Japanese businessman and gambler, stabbed.
- Larry Lauer, 64, American football player (Green Bay Packers).
- Carl McVoy, 61, American pianist.
- Domenico Meldolesi, 51, Italian racing cyclist.
- George Meyer, 82, American baseball player (Chicago White Sox).
- Al Nichelini, 82, American football player (Chicago Cardinals).
- Matteo Poggi, 78, Italian football player and coach.
- Antonio Quirino, 85, Filipino judge, entrepreneur and politician.
- Carl Schmidt, 87, Danish Olympic rower (1928).
- Gábor Szarvas, 48, Hungarian weightlifter and Olympian (1972).
- Radomiro Tomic, 77, Chilean politician.
- Pavel Zyryanov, 84, Soviet major general and former commander of the Soviet Border Troops.

=== 4 ===
- Alejandro Carrión, 76, Ecuadorian poet, novelist and journalist.
- Patrick Gallacher, 82, Scottish football player.
- Antonio Ghiardello, 93, Italian rower and Olympic medalist (1932, 1936).
- Teddy Grace, 86, American jazz singer.
- Georges Mordant, 64, Belgian footballer.
- Edmund Samarakkody, 79, Ceylonese lawyer, trade unionist, and politician.
- Tim Washington, 32, American football player (San Francisco 49ers, Kansas City Chiefs), pneumonia.

=== 5 ===
- Ze'ev Aleksandrowicz, 86, Israeli photographer.
- Philip J. Dolan, 68, American physicist.
- Dattatraya Ganesh Godse, 77, Indian historian, playwright, and art critic.
- Reuben "Rube" Lautenschlager, 76, American basketball player.
- Chester Schaeffer, 89, American film editor.

=== 6 ===
- Éva Balázs, 49, Hungarian Olympic cross-country skier (1964, 1968).
- Carl Bridenbaugh, 88, American historian of Colonial America.
- Bent Christensen, 62, Danish film director, actor, and screenwriter, cancer.
- Nikolay Dutov, 53, Soviet-Russian Olympic long-distance runner (1964).
- Steve Gilpin, 42, New Zealand singer, traffic collision.
- Einar Mangset, 98, Norwegian Olympic sprinter (1920).
- Jean-Paul Matte, 77, Canadian politician, member of the House of Commons of Canada (1962-1968).
- Stan Wright, 73, Australian rules footballer.

=== 7 ===
- Richard Hunt, 40, American puppeteer (The Muppets).
- Gilles Lalay, 29, French motorcycle racer, motorcycle accident.
- Robert Lord, 46, New Zealand playwright.
- Andrew Marton, 87, Hungarian-American film director, cancer.
- Ian Wood, 90, Australian politician.

=== 8 ===
- Proinsias Mac Airt, 69, Irish republican activist.
- Abderrahim Bouabid, 69, Moroccan politician.
- Anthony Dawson, 75, Scottish actor (Dr. No, Dial M for Murder, Valley of Eagles), cancer.
- Giuseppe Farfanelli, 76, Italian Olympic boxer (1936).
- John Harrington, 70, American gridiron football player (Cleveland Browns).
- Marjorie Kane, 82, American film and stage actress.
- Johnny Meijer, 79, Dutch accordionist.
- Natan Peled, 78, Israeli politician.
- Nicolas Schöffer, 79, Hungarian-French cybernetic artist.
- Zoya Voskresenskaya, 84, Soviet diplomat, NKVD secret agent, and children's author.
- Joe Zeno, 72, American gridiron football player (Washington Redskins).

=== 9 ===
- Steve Brodie, 72, American actor, cancer.
- Claude Coats, 78, American animator (Snow White and the Seven Dwarfs, Dumbo, Peter Pan).
- Ty Coon, 76, American football player (Brooklyn Dodgers).
- Al Coppage, 75, American gridiron football player (Chicago Cardinals, Cleveland Browns).
- Hans Jenny, 92, Swiss-American soil scientist.
- Walt Kichefski, 75, American football player (Pittsburgh Steelers, Card-Pitt), and coach.
- Bill Naughton, 81, British playwright.
- Luigi Stipa, 91, Italian aeronautical engineer and aircraft designer.
- Louis Terrenoire, 83, French politician.
- Jochen van Aerssen, 50, German politician and member of the Bundestag.

=== 10 ===
- Roberto Bonomi, 72, Argentine racing driver.
- Barbara Couper, 89, British actress.
- Geoff Dalley, 75, Australian rules footballer.
- Johnny Hawke, 67, Australian rugby league football player, parkinson's disease.
- James I. Loeb, 82, American politician and diplomat, pneumonia.
- Estevão Molnar, 76, Brazilian Olympic fencer (1948, 1952).
- Daniel Norton, 86, Australian politician.
- Joe Paterson, 68, Scottish cricketer.

=== 11 ===
- Heikki Aaltoila, 86, Finnish film composer.
- Jean Claudio, 64, French actor.
- Juan Gilberto Funes, 28, Argentine footballer, heart attack.
- David Hambartsumyan, 35, Soviet-Armenian Olympic diver (1972, 1976, 1980).
- Hans-Wolfgang Heidland, 79, German Olympic diver (1932).
- William George Hoskins, 83, English historian.
- Edward Jancarz, 45, Polish speedway rider, knifed.
- Orville Jorgens, 83, American baseball player (Philadelphia Phillies).
- Morton Kaer, 89, American gridiron football player (Frankford Yellow Jackets), and Olympic pentathlete (1924).
- Lucien Tostain, 82, French Olympic long-distance runner (1936).
- Eckart-Wilhelm von Bonin, 72, German Luftwaffe pilot during World War II.

=== 12 ===
- Lode Anthonis, 69, Belgian racing cyclist.
- Arthur Cairns, 74, Australian rules footballer.
- Bilegiin Damdinsüren, 73, Mongolian musician and composer.
- Kumar Gandharva, 67, Indian classical singer.
- Johnny Knolla, 72, American football player (Chicago Cardinals).
- Walt Morey, 84, American author.
- George Strohmeyer, 67, American gridiron football player.
- Harry van Doorn, 76, Dutch politician.

=== 13 ===
- Hugh Meade Alcorn, Jr., 84, American politician, stroke.
- Yvonne Bryceland, 66, South African actress, cancer.
- Dagny Lind, 89, Swedish film actress.
- Stu MacMillan, 83, American football player (Cleveland Indians).
- Josef Neckermann, 79, German equestrian and Olympic champion (1960, 1964, 1968, 1972).
- Mehdi Abbasov, 32, Azerbaijani politician and soldier, killed in battle.
- Henri Queffélec, 81, French novelist.
- Gerhard Rose, 95, German scientist and war criminal during World War II.

=== 14 ===
- Irakli Abashidze, 82, Georgian poet, literary scholar and politician.
- Walter Herssens, 61, Belgian decathlete and Olympian (1952, 1956).
- Ernst Wilhelm Kalinke, 73, German cinematographer.
- Vernon E. Megee, 91, United States Marine Corps general.
- Jerry Nolan, 45, American rock drummer, stroke.
- Alf Teichs, 87, German filmmaker.
- Flory Van Donck, 79, Belgian golfer.

=== 15 ===
- Zhang Dazhi, 80, Chinese lieutenant general and politician.
- Charlie Gassaway, 73, American baseball player (Chicago Cubs, Philadelphia Athletics, Cleveland Indians).
- Fritz Kraatz, 85, Swiss Olympic ice hockey player (1928).
- Dee Murray, 45, English bassist (Elton John Band), stroke.
- Suzanne Muzard, 91, French prostitute and photographer.
- Angel Penna, Sr., 68, Argentine-American racehorse trainer.
- Hari Rhodes, 59, American actor, heart attack.

=== 16 ===
- Ross Patterson Alger, 71, Canadian politician, cancer.
- Walter Bartel, 87, German communist resistance member during World War II, and historian.
- Albert R. Behnke, 88, American physician.
- Ajahn Chah, 73, Thai Buddhist monk.
- Richie Emselle, 74, Australian rules footballer.
- Tom Kearney, 68, Irish Olympic fencer (1952, 1960).
- W. John Kenney, 87, United States Assistant Secretary of the Navy.
- Carl-Gustaf Lindstedt, 70, Swedish comedian and actor, heart attack.
- Shelagh Roberts, 67, British politician, cancer.
- Dincă Schileru, 81-82, Romanian footballer and manager.

=== 17 ===
- Dorothy Alison, 66, Australian actress.
- Luigi Durand de la Penne, 77, Italian Navy admiral.
- Red Durrett, 70, American baseball player (Brooklyn Dodgers).
- Ramey Hunter, 81, American football player (Portsmouth Spartans).
- Henry Stommel, 71, American oceanographer.
- Charlie Ventura, 75, American saxophonist, lung cancer.

=== 18 ===
- Hamidul Huq Choudhury, 90, Bangladeshi politician.
- Theodore L. Futch, 96, United States Army brigadier general.
- Philomena Gianfrancisco, 68, American baseball player.
- George Hill, 90, American Olympic sprinter (1924).
- Ruby R. Levitt, 84, American set decorator (The Sound of Music, The Andromeda Strain, Chinatown).
- Cromie McCandless, 71, Northern Irish racing motorcyclist.
- Henriette von Schirach, 78, German writer and wife of Baldur von Schirach.
- Shigeo Tanaka, 85, Japanese film director.
- Douglas Woolf, 69, American author of novels and book reviews.

=== 19 ===
- Augusto Benedico, 82, Spanish-Mexican actor.
- Pietro di Donato, 80, American writer, bone cancer.
- Albert Glock, 66, American archaeologist, murdered.
- Bill Horton, 86, English rugby player.
- Ted W. Lawson, 74, United States Air Force officer.
- Manabendra Mukhopadhyay, 62, Indian singer-songwriter.

=== 20 ===
- Mario Ariosa, 71, Cuban baseball player.
- Milovan Gavazzi, 96, Croatian ethnographer.
- Mohamed Abdul Khalek Hassouna, 93, Egyptian diplomat, 2nd Secretary-General of the Arab League.
- Trond Hegna, 93, Norwegian politician.
- Charles Kenny, 93, American composer, author, and violinist.
- Charles Kiffer-Porte, 89, French painter.
- Theodore Lukits, 94, Romanian-American painter.
- Jean-Pierre Lecocq, 44, Belgian molecular biologist, plane crash.
- Tom McCarthy, 57, Canadian ice hockey player (Detroit Red Wings, Boston Bruins).

=== 21 ===
- Edmund Collein, 86, German architect.
- Bernard Cornut-Gentille, 82, French administrator and politician.
- Champion Jack Dupree, 81, American blues musician, cancer.
- Franz Hanreiter, 78, Austrian footballer.
- Marita Katusheva, 53, Soviet volleyball player and Olympic silver medalist (1964).
- Eddie Mabo, 55, Australian indigenous people's activist, cancer.
- Miguel Manzano, 84, Mexican actor, kidney failure.
- Daniel Rossi, 71, Uruguayan Olympic fencer (1948).
- Chuck Rowland, 92, American baseball player (Philadelphia Athletics).

=== 22 ===
- A. J. Antoon, 47, American theatre director, AIDS-related lymphoma.
- Desmond Fell, 79, South African cricketer.
- Marcel Fitoussi, 93, French Olympic sports shooter (1936).
- Mark Hopkinson, 42, American convicted murderer, execution by lethal injection.
- Derek Walker-Smith, Baron Broxbourne, 81, British politician.
- Fernand Buyle, 73, Belgian footballer.
- Billy Graham, 69, American boxer, cancer.
- Jim Jeffers, 79, Australian rules footballer.
- Glen Robbins, 79, Canadian Olympic cyclist (1932).
- Guerrino Scher, 76, Italian Olympic rower (1932).
- Francisco Urroz, 71, Chilean football player.

=== 23 ===
- Freddie Bartholomew, 67, English-American child actor, heart failure.
- Harry Mortimer, 89, English composer and conductor.
- Joseph Mugnaini, 79, Italian-American artist and illustrator.
- Ian Wolfe, 95, American actor.

=== 24 ===
- Miklos Bencze, 80, Hungarian-American operatic bass and voice teacher
- Ignacio Bernal, 81, Mexican anthropologist and archaeologist.
- Donald Bick, 55, English cricketer.
- John Bleifer, 90, American actor.
- Tina Chow, 41, American model and jewelry designer, AIDS.
- Ken Darby, 82, American composer, lyricist, and conductor.
- Klaes Karppinen, 84, Finnish cross-country skier and Olympic champion (1936).
- Ricky Ray Rector, 42, American convicted murderer, execution by lethal injection.
- Talia Shapira, 45, Israeli actress, cancer.
- Jenő Szilágyi, 81, Hungarian Olympic long-distance runner (1936).

=== 25 ===
- Raban Adelmann, 79, German politician and member of the Bundestag.
- Riad Ahmadov, 35, Azerbaijan officer and war hero, killed in action.
- Kay Beauchamp, 92, British communist activist and feminist.
- Guido Buzzelli, 64, Italian comic book artist, writer, and painter.
- Pedro Linares, 85, Mexican artist.
- Mahmoud Riad, 75, Egyptian diplomat.

=== 26 ===
- Sheldon Chumir, 51, Canadian lawyer and politician.
- Percy Griffith Davies, 89, Canadian politician, member of the House of Commons of Canada (1932-1935).
- José Ferrer, 80, Puerto Rican actor (Cyrano de Bergerac, Lawrence of Arabia, The Caine Mutiny) and filmmaker, colorectal cancer.
- Gilroy Roberts, 86, American sculptor and minter.
- Hans Schulze, 80, German Olympic water polo player (1932, 1936).

=== 27 ===
- John Alcorn, 56, American artist, designer, and illustrator.
- Boris Arapov, 86, Russian composer.
- Georges Arlin, 89, French Olympic field hockey player (1928).
- Bharat Bhushan, 71, Indian actor, scriptwriter and producer.
- Lonnie Blair, 62, American baseball player.
- Dame Gwen Ffangcon-Davies, 101, English actress.
- Pekka Mellavuo, 78, Finnish Olympic wrestler (1948).
- Sally Mugabe, 60, Zimbabwean activist, first lady (since 1987), kidney failure.
- Satan Panonski, 31, Croatian punk singer, gunshot.
- Clara Solovera, 82, Chilean folk musician.
- William Walker, 95, American television and film actor, cancer.

=== 28 ===
- Alfonso Ahumada, 78, Colombian Olympic fencer (1948).
- Arvid Andersson-Holtman, 95, Swedish gymnast and Olympic champion (1920).
- Nahman Avigad, 86, Israeli archaeologist.
- Hans Lang, 83, Austrian composer of light music, film music and Viennese songs.
- Ərəstun Mahmudov, 34, Azerbaijani officer and war hero, killed in action..
- Marifat Nasibov, 19, Azerbaijani soldier and war hero, killed in action.
- Viktor Seryogin, 47, Azerbaijani soldier and war hero, killed in action.
- Herta Wunder, 78, German Olympic swimmer (1928).
- Mehmet Ali Yalım, 62, Turkish Olympic basketball player (1952).
- Arvo Ylppö, 104, Finnish physician and academic.

=== 29 ===
- Michael Hicks Beach, 2nd Earl St Aldwyn, 79, British politician.
- Noer Alie, 77, Indonesian Islamic leader and educator.
- Willie Dixon, 76, American blues musician, heart failure.
- Art Somers, 90, Canadian ice hockey player (Chicago Black Hawks, New York Rangers).

=== 30 ===
- Ole Bakken, 69, Canadian Olympic basketball player (1948).
- Francis Birch, 88, American geophysicist, prostate cancer.
- Albin Novšak, 76, Yugoslavian Olympic ski jumper (1936).
- Ed Taylor, 90, American baseball player (Boston Braves).
- George Frederick James Temple, 90, English mathematician9.
- Coaker Triplett, 80, American baseball player (Chicago Cubs, St. Louis Cardinals, Philadelphia Phillies).

=== 31 ===
- Ludwig Geyer, 87, German cyclist.
- Mel Hein, 82, American Hall of Fame football player (New York Giants), stomach cancer.
- Martin Held, 83, German television and film actor.
- Richard Nixon, 26, Australian rules footballer.
- István Sárközi, 44, Hungarian Olympic footballer (1968), traffic collision.
