= Javadov =

Javadov is a surname. Notable people with the surname include:

- Arastun Javadov (1948–2023), Azerbaijani politician
- Füzuli Javadov (1950–2021), Azerbaijani footballer
- Isgandar Javadov (born 1956), Azerbaijani footballer
- Jalil Javadov (1918–1980), Soviet Azerbaijani commander
- Rovshan Javadov (1951–1995), Azerbaijani military officer
- Tofig Javadov (1925–1963), Azerbaijani painter
- Vagif Javadov (born 1989), Azerbaijani footballer
