= Tawfik =

Tawfiq
- Pronunciation: Arabic: [ˈtawˌfiːq, ˈtoː-, ˈtu-] Turkish: [ˈtevfiq]
- Gender: Male

Origin
- Origin: Arabic

Other names
- Alternative spelling: Tewfik, Taoufic, Taufiq, Tawfiq, Tawfeeq, Toufic, Thoufeeq, Thoufeeque, among many other variants in the Latin alphabet
- Related names: Tevfik, Tofig/Tofiq

Tawfik (Arabic: توفيق) or Tawfiq is a masculine given name and surname of Arabic origin. The name is derived from the Arabic root: waaw-faa-qaaf (و-ف-ق), which primarily ‘divine success’. However, it can also mean the following: ‘to agree’, ‘to reconcile’. A spelling of Tewfik or Toufic is used more among French speakers. Since it is considered a "neutral" name in the Arabic language, many Arabic-speaking Christians as well as Muslims are named Tawfik. The Turkish equivalent is Tevfik, the Azerbaijani equivalent is Tofig or Tofiq, the Albanian equivalent is Tefik, the Bosnian equivalent is Teufik. Taoufik and Toufic are common in North Africa (Morocco, Tunisia and Algeria). Thoufeeque, Thoufeeq, and Thoufeek are common in India. A phonetically similar Jewish name is Tovik or Tuvik (תוביק), a Yiddish diminutive of the Biblical Hebrew name Toviyah, which led to the Greek equivalent Tobias (Τοβίας). Notable people with the name include:

== Given name ==
=== Taoufik ===
- Taoufik Baccar (born 1950), Tunisian politician
- Taoufik Belbouli (born 1954), Tunisian boxer
- Taoufik Ben Brik (born 1960), Tunisian journalist
- Taoufik Bouachrine (born 1969), Moroccan journalist
- Taoufik Charfeddine (born 1968), Tunisian politician
- Taoufik Cheikhrouhou (1944–2026), Tunisian politician
- Taoufik Chobba (born 1982), Tunisian boxer
- Taoufik Djemail (born 1948), Tunisian handball player
- Taoufik Hicheri (born 1965), Tunisian footballer
- Taoufik Maaouia (born 1959), Tunisian weightlifter
- Taoufik Makhloufi (born 1988), Algerian athlete
- Taoufik Mehedhebi (born 1965), Tunisian footballer
- Taoufik Ben Othman (born 1939), Tunisian footballer
- Taoufik Rouabah (born 1970), Algerian football manager
- Taoufik Salhi (born 1979), Tunisian footballer

=== Taufeeq ===
- Taufeeq Khan, Pakistani cricket umpire
- Taufeeq Umar (born 1981), Pakistani cricketer

=== Taufic ===
- Taufic Guarch (born 1991), Mexican footballer

=== Taufik ===
- Taufik Akbar (born 1951), Indonesian engineer
- Taufik Batisah (born 1981), Singaporean singer
- Taufik Cotran (1926–2007), Palestinian Commonwealth jurist
- Taufik Hidayat (born 1981), Indonesian badminton player
- Taufik Hidayat (footballer, born 1993) (born 1993), Indonesian footballer
- Taufik Hidayat (footballer, born 1999) (born 1999), Indonesian footballer
- Taufik Hidayat (Gerindra Party politician) (born 1959), Indonesian brigadier general
- Taufik Ikram Jamil (born 1963), Indonesian writer and journalist
- Taufik Kurniawan (1967–2022), Indonesian politician
- Taufikurrahman Saleh (1949–2023), Indonesian politician and lawyer
- Taufik Seidu (born 2008), Ghanaian-Spanish footballer
- Taufik Soleh (born 1985), Indonesian footballer
- Taufik Suparno (born 1995), Singaporean footballer

=== Taufiq ===
- Taufiq Ahmed (East Pakistan cricketer), Bangladeshi cricketer
- Taufiq Ahmed (Pakistan Air Force cricketer), Pakistani cricketer
- Taufiq Febriyanto (born 1997), Indonesian footballer
- Taufiq Ghani (born 1989), Singaporean footballer
- Taufiq Ismail (born 1935), Indonesian poet, activist, and editor
- Taufiq Kasrun (born 1985), Indonesian professional footballer
- Taufiq Kiemas (1942–2013), Indonesian politician
- Taufiq Muqminin (born 1996), Singaporean footballer
- Taufiq Qureshi (born 1962), Indian classical musician
- Taufiq Rafat (1927–1998), Pakistani author and poet
- Taufiq Rahmat (born 1987), Singaporean footballer
- Taufiq Tirmizi (1960–2020), Pakistani cricketer
- Taufiq Wahby (1891–1984), Iraqi writer, linguist, and politician

=== Tawfik ===
- Tawfik Alzaidi (born 1982), Saudi film director, producer, and screenwriter
- Tawfik Bagalana (born 1999), Ugandan rugby union player
- Tawfik Bahri (1952–2021), Tunisian actor
- Tawfik Bentayeb (born 2002), Moroccan footballer
- Tawfik Hamid (born 1961), Egyptian author
- Tawfik Abu Al-Huda, (1894–1956), Jordanian politician
- Tawfik Jaber (died 2008), Palestinian police officer
- Tawfik Jelassi (born 1957), Tunisian academic
- Tawfik Khatib (born 1954), Israeli-Arab politician
- Tawfik Okasha (born 1967), Egyptian television presenter
- Tawfik Sakr (born 1969), Egyptian footballer
- Tawfik Tirawi (born 1948), Palestinian politician
- Tawfik Toubi (1922–2011), Israeli-Arab politician

=== Tawfiq ===
- Tawfiq Ali (born 1990), Palestinian footballer
- Tawfiq Yusuf 'Awwad (1911–1989), Lebanese writer and diplomat
- Tawfiq Bay, Syrian traveler
- Tawfiq Buhimed (born 1987), Saudi footballer
- Tawfiq Canaan (1882–1964), Palestinian physician, medical researcher, ethnographer, and Palestinian nationalist
- Tawfiq-e-Elahi Chowdhury, Bangladeshi politician
- Tawfiq Fakhouri (1935–2020), Jordanian banker and entrepreneur
- Tawfiq al-Hakim (1898–1987), Egyptian writer and visionary
- Tawfique Hasan, Bangladeshi scientist
- Tawfiq Kreishan (born 1947), Jordanian politician
- Tawfique Nawaz (1949/50–2026), Bangladeshi lawyer
- Tawfiq Al-Nimri (1918–2011), Jordanian singer and composer
- Tawfiq Sayigh (1923–1971), Palestinian academic, writer, and journalist
- Tawfiq al-Suwaidi (1892–1968), Iraqi politician
- Tawfiq Tayarah (born 1984), Syrian footballer
- Tawfiq Titingan (1963–2018), Malaysian politician
- Tawfiq al-Yasiri (died 2020), Iraqi military officer and politician
- Tawfiq Younes, Syrian major general
- Tawfiq Ziad (1929–1994), Palestinian politician

=== Tefik ===
- Tefik Mborja (1891–1954), Albanian politician and lawyer
- Tefik Osmani (born 1985), Albanian footballer

=== Teufik ===
- Servet Teufik Agaj, Albanian footballer

=== Tewfik ===
- Tewfik Abdullah (1896–1963), Egyptian footballer
- Tewfik Allal (born 1947), Moroccan writer and political figure
- Tewfik Jallab (born 1982), French-Moroccan actor
- Tewfik Mishlawi (1935–2012), Lebanese journalist
- Tewfik Pasha (or Tawfiq of Egypt, 1852–1892), Khedive of Egypt and Sudan
- Tewfik Saleh (1926–2013), Egyptian film director and writer

=== Toufic ===
- Toufic Aboukhater (1934–2020), Monaco-based Palestinian-Lebanese businessman
- Toufic Ali (born 1989), Palestinian footballer
- Toufic El Bacha (1924–2005), Lebanese composer and musician
- Toufic Barbir, Lebanese footballer
- Toufic Ahmad Choudhury, Bangladesh economist and banker
- Toufic Farroukh (born 1958), Lebanese-French jazz composer
- Toufic El Hajj, Lebanese international rugby league footballer
- Toufic Maatouk, Lebanese orchestra conductor

=== Toufik ===
- Toufik Addadi (born 1990), Algerian footballer
- Toufik el-Hibri (1869–1954), Lebanese Islamic cleric and scout
- Toufik Mansour (born 1968), Israeli mathematician
- Toufik Mekhalfi (born 2002), French squash player
- Toufik Moussaoui (born 1991), Algerian footballer
- Toufik Rouabah (born 1970), Algerian football manager
- Toufik Zeghdane (born 1992), Algerian footballer
- Toufik Zerara (born 1986), Algerian footballer

=== Toufiq ===
- Toufiq M. Seraj (1956–2019), Bangladeshi businessman
- Toufiq Islam Shatil (born 1974), Bangladeshi diplomat

=== Toufique ===
- Toufique Hasan, Bangladeshi diplomat
- Toufique Imrose Khalidi (1967–2026), Bangladeshi journalist, editor, and businessman

=== Tufi ===
- Tufi Duek (born 1954), Brazilian fashion designer

== Surname ==
=== Taoufik ===
- Sami Taoufik (born 2002), Moroccan racing driver

=== Taufiq ===
- Muhammad Taufiq (born 1986), Indonesian footballer
- Rejwan Ahammad Taufiq (born 1969), Bangladesh politician

=== Tawfik ===
- Abdelaziz Tawfik (born 1986), Egyptian footballer
- Abdel Nasser Tawfik (born 1967), Egyptian physicist
- Ahmed Tawfik (born 1991), Egyptian footballer
- Ahmed Tawfik (basketball) (born 1987), Egyptian basketball player
- Ahmed Khaled Tawfik (1962–2018), Egyptian writer
- Anwar Tawfik (1914–??), Egyptian fencer
- Ehab Tawfik (born 1966), Egyptian singer
- Hassan Hosni Tawfik (1911–2005), Egyptian Olympic fencer

=== Tawfiq ===
- Hisham Tawfiq (born 1970), American actor

=== Tewfik ===
- Makarios Tewfik (born 1945), Egyptian Coptic Catholic bishop
- Samira Tewfik (born 1944), Lebanese singer

=== Toufic ===
- Jalal Toufic, Lebanese artist, filmmaker, and author
- Walid Toufic (born 1954), Lebanese singer and actor

== Places ==
- Tawafiq, Syria, village in the southern Golan Heights
- Port Tewfik, the old name of Suez Port
  - Port Tewfik Memorial, Indian War Memorial originally situated at Port Tewfik on the Suez Canal

== See also ==
- 12179 Taufiq, minor planet
- Tawfiq (magazine), weekly satirical magazine published between 1922 and 1971 in Iran
- SV Toufic El Rahman, Syrian sailing ship sunk by the German submarine U-77, east of Cape Greco, Crete
- Toufic H. Kalil House, structure built by Frank Lloyd Wright in Manchester, New Hampshire
