= Fakhoury =

Fakhoury or variant Fakhouri (Arabic: فاخوري) or variants Al-Fakhoury, Al-Fakhouri, El-Fakhoury, or El-Fakhouri (Arabic: الفاخوري) is an Arabic surname originating in Lebanon [disputed], with many people bearing the surname being Palestinian or Jordanian.

The root of the surname Fakhoury likely comes from the Arabic root word fakhour (Arabic: فخور) meaning ‘proud’. Many of the Fakhoury families can trace their roots to the Lebanese city of Rachaya Al Foukhar but they separated and some of them relocated to Saida where they bought a great amount of lands and got involved in the political decision of the South, while others spread in Keserwan and Matn area.

The Fakhoury family used to be one of the most important families of the South since 1785. After the turn of the 19th century they began to establish significant positions of power within the Ottoman Empire where they were granted the title of بيك Beik. As a long line of land owners and tax collectors, the Fakhouries were able to leverage their finances and capital using their connections to American, British, French, German and Russian consuls over the decade to establish extensive economic and political connections.

They also lived in Jordan near Amman with some later spreading to Syria, Palestine, or west to the United States, most commonly migrating to Michigan, New York, California, and Chicago. A large number also migrated to Sydney, Australia, Mexico City, Mexico and São Paulo, Brazil. Some of the Catholic families originally migrated from Russia, then to Albania after settlement in Lebanon in the 1870s.

== People with the surname ==
- Abdallah Al-Fakhouri (born 2000), Jordanian footballer
- Bushra Fakhoury, British sculptor in bronze and stone
- Cécile Fakhoury, French-Ivorian gallery owner
- Clément Fakhoury (born 1964), Senegalese sport shooter
- Derrie Fakhoury (1930–2015), Lebanese artist
- Dina Fakhoury, American actress, in the 2014 film The Cut
- Hanna Al-Fakhoury (1914–2011), Lebanese Melkite priest, philosopher and linguist
- Hassan Fakhoury, Colombian expert in logistics and international trade
- Jihad Fakhouri (born 1966) is a famous dental surgeon, researcher, professor and international speaker and author Pensées dévoilées
- Keno Fakhoury (born 2003), German child actor
- Pierre Fakhoury (born 1943), Lebanese/Ivorian architect
- Tamirace Fakhoury (born 1975), Lebanese poet
- Tawfiq Fakhouri (1935–2020), founder of the Bank of Jordan
- Zein Fakhoury, American actress, in the 2014 film The Cut
