= Tofig =

Tofig, Tofigh, Tofik, or Tofiq is a masculine given name of Azerbaijani origin. It is equivalent to the Arabic name Tawfik. Notable people with the name include:

== Given name ==
=== Tofig ===
- Tofig Aghababayev (1928–2024), Azerbaijani painter
- Tofig Aghahuseynov (1923–2021), Soviet-Azerbaijani colonel general
- Tofig Ahmadov (1926–1990), Azerbaijani politician and engineer
- Tofig Aliyev (born 2004), Azerbaijani trampolinist
- Tofig Bakikhanov (1930–2026), Azerbaijani composer
- Tofig Gasimov (1938–2020), Azerbaijani politician and diplomat
- Tofig Guliyev (1917–2000), Azerbaijani composer, pianist, and conductor
- Tofig Heydarov (born 1972), Azerbaijani weightlifter
- Tofig Huseynov (1954–1992), Azerbaijani war hero
- Tofig Huseynzade (1946–2006), Armenian-born Azerbaijani philologist, folklorist, journalist, and poet
- Tofig Ismayilov (film director) (1939–2016), Azerbaijani film director, screenwriter, and film scholar
- Tofig Javadov (1925–1963), Azerbaijani painter
- Tofig Kocharli (1929–2007), Soviet-Azerbaijani historian and politician
- Tofig Mahmud (1931–1997), Azerbaijani poet, writer, translator, and publicist
- Tofig Mammadov (born 1980), Azerbaijani Paralympic judoka
- Tofig Mirzoyev (1932–2026), Azerbaijani actor, film director, and musician
- Tofig Safaraliyev (1932–1983), Azerbaijani politician
- Tofig Yagublu (born 1961), Azerbaijani politician and journalist
- Tofig Zulfugarov (born 1959), Azerbaijani politician

=== Tofigh ===
- Tofigh Jahanbakht (1931–1970), Iranian freestyle wrestler

=== Tofik ===
- Tofik Dibi (born 1980), Dutch politician
- Tofik Ismailov (1933–1991), Azerbaijani politician
- Tofik Kadimov (born 1989), Russian footballer

=== Tofiq ===
- Tofiq Bahramov (1925–1993), Soviet-Azerbaijani football player and referee
- Tofiq Musayev (born 1989), Azerbaijani mixed martial artist
