= Arastun =

Arastun is a given name. Notable people with the name include:

- Arastun Javadov (1948–2023), Azerbaijani politician
- Arastun Mahmudov (1957–1992), National Hero of Azerbaijan
