= 2010–11 Persebaya Surabaya (DU) season =

Persebaya Surabaya (DU)
2010-11 season
- President: Wishnu Wardhana; Jalil Latuconsina
- Headcoach: Suwandi HS
- Stadium: Gelora 10 November Stadium, Surabaya
- Premier Division: First round (5th in Group 3)
- Top goalscorer: Cornelis Kaimu (8)

The 2010-11 season was Persebaya Surabaya (DU) first season in the club's football history, the first season in the second-tier Liga Indonesia season and the first season competing in the Liga Indonesia Premier Division. They compete in Premier Division after the acquisition of league slots and membership from Persikubar West Kutai. Persebaya Surabaya (DU) was illegally profiteering identity of Persebaya and thus becoming the clone of Persebaya 1927 that competed in the Liga Primer Indonesia (LPI). Provisionally the name Persebaya Surabaya becoming the right of Persebaya Surabaya DU, because had previously received security permission from the police earlier. Persebaya 1927 based on existing legality, they are the ones who have more right to use the name Persebaya Surabaya. However, they were forced to change the name by the police.

== Squad ==
Note: Flags indicate national team as defined under FIFA eligibility rules; some limited exceptions apply. Players may hold more than one non-FIFA nationality.

No.	Pos.	Nation	Player
1	GK	IDN	Aris Novandi
2	DF	IDN	Imam Yulianto
3	DF	IDN	Khodari Amir
4	DF	IDN	Taufik Soleh
7	MF	IDN	La Umbu
8	FW	IDN	Sarwani Agustian
10	FW	CMR	Charles Orock
11	FW	IDN	Joni
12	MF	IDN	Hariyanto
14	MF	IDN	Muhammad Kusen
15	DF	IDN	Rifai Arsyad
16	DF	IDN	Agusmanto
17	DF	IDN	Rustanto Sri Wahono
18	DF	IDN	Sulkhan Arif
19	DF	IDN	Fendi Taris
22	MF	IDN	Rahmat
25	MF	IDN	Kuncoro

No.	Pos.	Nation	Player
26	GK	IDN	Aditya Fajar
29	DF	IDN	Miftaqul Huda
33	FW	IDN	Syaiful Bahri
65	FW	IDN	Cornelis Kaimu
77	MF	LBR	Sackie Doe
—	MF	GUI	Fassawa Camara
—	DF	IDN	Redi Suprianto
—	DF	IDN	Dwi Santo Putra
—	MF	IDN	Redi Redianto
—	MF	IDN	Heri Kiswono
—	MF	IDN	Arisadi
—	MF	IDN	Dedi Eko
—	MF	IDN	Alfi
—	MF	IDN	Eri Budi
—	MF	IDN	Sidiq Nurcahyono
—	MF	IDN	Himawan
—	MF	IDN	Munir Nurcahyo
—	FW	IDN	Solikhin
—	FW	IDN	Wimba Sutan Fanosa
—	FW	IDN	Fandi Eko Utomo
