= Pirəbülqasım =

Pirəbilqasım
- Municipality
- Location within Azerbaijan
- Coordinates: 40°41′40″N 48°20′37″E
- Country: Azerbaijan
- Rayon: Ismailli

Population
  - Total: 157
- Time zone: UTC+4 (AZT)
  - Summer (DST): UTC+5 (AZT)

Pirəbülqasım (also, Pirabil’kasum, Pirabul’kasim, and Pirabul’kasym) is a village and municipality in the Ismailli Rayon of Azerbaijan. It has a population of 157.

== Notable natives ==
- Arastun Mahmudov — national hero of Azerbaijan.
