= Stuart McMillan (disambiguation) =

Stuart McMillan is the name of several people including:

- Stuart McMillan (footballer) (1896–1963), English footballer and cricketer
- Stu MacMillan (1908–1992), American football player
- Stuart McMillan (church leader) (born 1955), former President of the Uniting Church in Australia
- Stuart MacMillan (born 1966), one of the members of Slam (DJs) from Scotland
- Stuart McMillan (born 1972), Scottish National Party Member of the Scottish Parliament
