= Joe Paterson =

Joe or Joseph Paterson may refer to:

- Joe Paterson (ice hockey), Canadian ice-hockey player
- Joe Paterson (baseball), American baseball player
- Joe Paterson (cricketer), Scottish cricketer

== See also ==
- Joseph Patterson (disambiguation)
- Paterson Joseph, British actor
