= Mirjavadov =

Mirjavadov is a surname. Notable people with the surname include:

- Aghasalim Mirjavadov (born 1947), Azerbaijani football coach
- Javad Mirjavadov (1923–1992), Azerbaijani painter
