= Joseph Patterson =

Joseph or Joe Patterson may refer to:

- Joseph H. Patterson (1912–1939), American naval officer and Olympic athlete
- Joseph M. Patterson (politician) (1837–1914), American politician
- Joseph Medill Patterson (1879–1946), American journalist and publisher
- Joseph Turner Patterson (1907–1969), Mississippi Attorney General
- Joseph Victor Patterson (1882–1968), farmer and political figure in Saskatchewan
- Billy Patterson (Joseph William Patterson, Jr., 1918–1998), American football player
- Joe Patterson (California politician), member of the California State Assembly

== See also ==
- Joseph Paterson (disambiguation)
