= Tevfik =

Tevfik is a Turkish given name for males corresponding to the Arabic Tawfik. Notable people named Tevfik include:

== First name ==
- Tevfik Ahmet Özal (born 1955), Turkish politician
- Tevfik Akbaşlı (born 1962), Turkish composer
- Tevfik Altındağ (born 1988), Turkish footballer
- Tevfik Arif (born 1953), Turkish-Russian real estate developer
- Tevfik Başer (born 1951), Turkish-German film director and screenwriter
- Tevfik Bıyıklıoğlu (1891–1961), Turkish politician
- Tevfik Burak Babaoğlu (born 1993), Turkish fencer
- Tevfik Esenç (1904–1992), last known speaker of the Ubykh language
- Tevfik Fikret (1867–1915), Turkish poet
- Tevfik Fikret Uçar (born 1966), Turkish academic
- Tevfik Gelenbe (1931–2004), Turkish actor
- Tevfik İleri (1911–1961), Turkish bureaucrat and politician
- Tevfik Köse (born 1988), Turkish footballer
- Tevfik Kış (1934–2019), Turkish wrestler
- Tevfik Lav (1959–2004), Turkish football manager
- Tevfik Odabaşı (born 1981), Turkish wrestler
- Tevfik Rüştü Aras (1883–1972), Turkish politician
- Tevfik Sağlam (1882–1963), Turkish doctor
- Tevfik Taşçı (1890–1979), Turkish footballer
- Tevfik Yüce (1927–2005), Turkish wrestler

== Second name ==
- Ahmet Tevfik Pasha (1845–1936), last Grand Vizier of the Ottoman Empire
- Celal Tevfik Karasapan (1899–1974), Turkish diplomat and politician
- Hüseyin Tevfik Pasha (1832–1901), Turkish diplomat and mathematician
- Mehmet Tevfik Biren (1867–1956), Turkish bureaucrat and politician
- Mehmet Tevfik Gerçeker (1898–1982), Turkish Islamic scholar
- Menderes Mehmet Tevfik Turel (born 1964), Turkish politician
- Nurullah Tevfik Ağansoy (1960–1996), Turkish gangster
- Rıza Tevfik Bölükbaşı (1869–1949), Ottoman and Turkish poet and philosopher

== Surname ==
- Ebüzziya Tevfik (1849–1913), Ottoman writer and politician
- Feriha Tevfik (1910–1991), Turkish actress
- Neyzen Tevfik (1879–1953), pen name of Turkish poet Tevfik Kolaylı
- Şehzade Ibrahim Tevfik (1874–1931), Ottoman prince

== See also ==
- Tevfik Sırrı Gür Stadium
- Tevfik Sırrı Gür High School
