= Taoufik Cheikhrouhou =

Tunisian politician (1944–2026)

- توفيق شيخ روحه

Minister of Professional Development and Employment
- In office 20 February 1991 – 9 June 1992
- Prime Minister: Hamed Karoui
- Preceded by: Tahar Azaiez
- Succeeded by: Moncer Rouissi

General Secretary of the Government
- In office 11 April 1989 – 20 February 1991
- Prime Minister: Hédi Baccouche; Hamed Karoui
- Preceded by: Houcine Cherif
- Succeeded by: Mohamed Habib Haj Saïd

Minister of Social Affairs
- In office 7 November 1987 – 27 September 1989
- Prime Minister: Hédi Baccouche
- Preceded by: Hédi Baccouche
- Succeeded by: Mocer Rouissi

Personal details
- Born: 21 December 1944
- Died: May 2026 (aged 81)
- Party: PSD; RCD
- Occupation: Civil servant

Taoufik Cheikhrouhou (Arabic: توفيق شيخ روحه; 21 December 1944 – May 2026) was a Tunisian politician of the Socialist Destourian Party (PSD) and the Democratic Constitutional Rally (RCD).

Cheikhrouhou served as Minister of Social Affairs from 1987 to 1989, General Secretary of the Government from 1989 to 1991, and Minister of Professional Development and Employment from 1991 to 1992.

Cheikhrouhou died in May 2026, at the age of 81.
