= Suzanne Muzard =

French prostitute and photographer (1900–1992)

- Born: Suzanne Fernande Muzard; 26 September 1900; Aubervilliers, Paris, France
- Died: 15 January 1992 (aged 91); Fitz-James, France
- Occupations: Prostitute, photographer
- Spouse(s): Emmanuel Berl (1928–1936), inter alia

Suzanne Muzard or Musard (1900–1992) was a French prostitute and photographer associated with surrealism. The lover of André Breton, she was addressed in Breton's love poems.

== Biography ==
Suzanne Fernande Muzard was born on 26 September 1900 in Aubervilliers, a suburb of Paris, into a working-class family. At 18 she was a boarder in a training school, but left to work in the la Ruchette brothel, on the rue de l’Arcade. Whilst working there she fell in love with a young nobleman, but his family forbade him developing a serious relationship with her. After this disappointment she moved to Lyon, where she had friends. Her friends introduced her to a new protector. In about 1924 she returned to the la Ruchette.

After meeting her during a visit to the brothel, the writer Emmanuel Berl fell in love with Muzard and in 1926 he set her up in an apartment.

At the beginning of November 1927, at the Café Cyrano, the rendezvous of the surrealists, Berl introduced Muzard to Andre Breton. It was love at first sight. Breton and Muzard decided to leave Paris and spend a fortnight in the south of France, although she did not want to separate from Berl. Back in Paris in mid-December, Breton added a third part to his novel Nadja, celebrating his new love affair with Muzard. Muzard pressurised Breton to divorce his wife, Simone, which he did. However Muzard ended their affair and married Berl. This caused resentment from Breton and the Surrealists.

The marriage was a tempestuous one. Breton wrote a surrealist poem about Muzard in 1931, L'Union libre (The Free Union). In 1934 she had an affair with Frederic Megret whilst in New Caledonia. On 26 October 1936 Muzard and Berl divorced.

After the divorce, Muzard moved to Tahiti, where she met photographer Jacques Cordonnier. Muzard and Cordonnier married in 1940 and stayed together until Cordonnier died in 1961.

Muzard wrote, under her married name of Cordonnier, an autobiographical essay entitled La passagère insoumise (The Rebellious Wanderer) in 1974.

Muzard died in 1992. Her unfinished memoirs were published in 2004 by Georges Sebbag in André Breton, l'amour-folie: Suzanne, Nadja, Lise, Simone, a book on surrealist women.

== Bibliography ==
- Biro, A (1985). Dictionnaire général du surréalisme et de ses environs (in French). Presses Universitaires De France (Puf). ISBN 9782130372806.
- Breton, André (1999). Nadja. Penguin. ISBN 9780141180892.
- Brophy, Kevin (2003). Explorations in Creative Writing. Melbourne Univ. Publishing. ISBN 9780522850567.
- Gubern, Román; Hammond, Paul (2012). Luis Buñuel: The Red Years, 1929–1939. University of Wisconsin Pres. ISBN 9780299284732.
- Morlino, Bernard (1990). Emmanuel Berl: les tribulations d'un pacifiste (in French). La Manufacture.
- Papalas, Marylaura (14 February 2017). "Léona Delcourt and Suzanne Muzard". Dada/Surrealism. 22 (1): 1–12. doi:10.17077/0084-9537.1323. ISSN 0084-9537.
- Pierre, José (1983). L'Univers surréaliste (in French). Somogy. ISBN 9782724233353.
- Polizzotti, Mark, ed. (2003). André Breton: Selections. University of California Press. ISBN 9780520239548.
- Sebbag, Georges (2004). André Breton, l'amour-folie: Suzanne, Naja, Lise, Simone (in French). Editions Jean-Michel Place. ISBN 9782858937769.
