= Tofig Javadov =

Azerbaijani painter

Tofig Javadov Tofiq Cavadov
- Born: February 7, 1925; Baku, Baku Uyezd, Azerbaijan SSR, TSFSR, USSR
- Died: August 20, 1963 (aged 38); Moscow, RSFSR, USSR
- Education: Azerbaijan State Art School named after Azim Azimzade
- Known for: artist
- Movement: landscape painting, still life, portrait

Tofig Mirhashim oghlu Javadov (Mirjavadov) (Azerbaijani: Tofiq Mirhaşım oğlu Cavadov (Mircavadov), February 7, 1925 — August 20, 1963) was an Azerbaijani painter.

== Biography ==
Tofig Javadov was born on February 7, 1925, in Baku. He served in Soviet Army from 1945 to 1948. From 1948 to 1952 he studied at the painting faculty of the Azerbaijan State School of Art named after Azim Azimzade. Azerbaijani artists such as Ayyub Mammadov, Abdul Khalig, Ayyub Huseynov and Baba Aliyev were his teachers.

T. Javadov died on August 20, 1963, at the Chepelyova station of the Moscow–Serpukhov electric train. He was the brother of Javad Mirjavadov.

== Career ==
Tofig Javadov began the period of neorealism in the second half of the 1950s. The neorealism period manifests itself in paintings of workers dedicated to oil and heavy industry. His works such as "Oilmen", "Industrial landscape", "Operator girl", "Oilman", "Steel founder workshop", "Portrait of steel founder" are the products of this period.

From 1955 to 1956, the "Buzovna" period began in Tofig Javadov's career. During this period, the artist created his "Street in Buzovna", "Village landscape", "Buzovna pass" and other Absheron landscapes from this series. In 1959–1961 he created the work "Self-Portrait". In 1963, together with Rasim Babayev and Fazil Najafov, he designed the children's magazine "Goyarchin". He created his last major work, "The Wind", in 1963.
