= Taufikurrahman Saleh =

Indonesian politician (1949–2023)

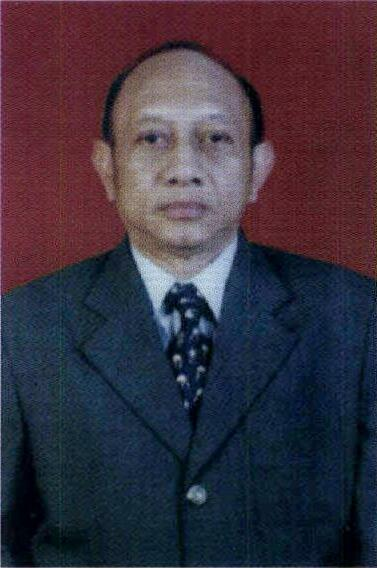
- Official portrait, 1999

Member of the People's Representative Council
- In office 1 October 1999 – 1 October 2009
- Constituency: East Java IX

Personal details
- Born: 4 September 1949 Surabaya, Indonesia
- Died: 20 January 2023 (aged 73) Lamongan, Indonesia
- Party: PPP (1985–1998); PKB (from 1998)
- Spouse: Sri Rahayu
- Children: 2
- Education: Airlangga University
- Occupation: Politician; lawyer

Taufikurrahman Saleh (4 September 1949 – 20 January 2023) was an Indonesian politician and lawyer who served as a member of the People's Representative Council representing the constituency of East Java IX from 1999 until 2009. He previously served as a member of the Surabaya city council and the East Java provincial assembly.

== Early life and career ==
=== Early life ===
Taufikurrahman Saleh was born on 4 September 1949 in Surabaya, East Java, to Muhammad Saleh and Siti Maemunah. His father, Muhammad Saleh, was of Javanese and Madurese descent and once led the East Java branch of the Nahdlatul Ulama, while his mother, Siti Maemunah, was of Javanese descent.

He completed his secondary education at the 9th Surabayan Junior State High School and a private high school in 1968 and 1970, respectively. He then studied law at the Airlangga University for ten years, graduating in 1980 with a bachelor's degree in law. During his time in the university, Taufikurrahman was active in various student organizations. He held leading positions in the Nahdlatul Ulama Students' Association and the Muslim Students' Association and chaired the university's student senate between 1975 and 1977.

=== Early career ===
Upon receiving his law degree, Taufikurrahman embarked on various careers, including working as a consultant and leading a personnel bureau at a sugar factory in Sidoarjo. He eventually settled on becoming a lecturer and a lawyer. He started teaching law at the Sunan Giri University in Surabaya and the National Administration Academy. After passing the bar in 1985, Taufikurrahman began working as a lawyer at a legal aid foundation in Surabaya.

== Political career ==
=== Local politics ===
Taufikurrahman joined the United Development Party (PPP) in 1985 and became the party's deputy leader in Surabaya. He was elected to the Surabaya city council in 1987 and became the PPP's leader in Surabaya in 1990. He was reelected for a second term in 1992 and became the deputy speaker of the council. In 1994, Taufikurrahman was embroiled in a bribery case after he was accused of signing a letter authorizing the release of funds, but he was not found guilty.

Shortly after his term in the council ended, in 1997 Taufikurrahman became a member of the East Java Regional People's Representative Council. After the fall of the Suharto regime in 1998, Taufikurrahman became the deputy speaker of the East Java Regional People's Representative Council. On the same year, Nahdlatul Ulama members split themselves from the United Development Party to form the National Awakening Party (PKB). Taufikurrahman joined the party and became a member of its central board.

=== DPR member ===
Taufikurrahman was elected as a member of the People's Representative Council by PKB in the 1999 Indonesian legislative election. He won re-election in 2004 with 105,981 votes. During his time in the council, Taufikurrahman was assigned to different commissions for short periods of time. In 2005, Taufikurrahman was nominated as the regent of Lamongan with a running mate from the Golkar party, but lost in the election.

In October 1999, Taufikurrahman was instructed by Matori Abdul Djalil, the party's chairman, to become a member of the preparation committee for the People's Consultative Assembly general session. The general session saw the election of Abdurrahman Wahid, PKB's main leader, as Indonesia's president. Shortly afterwards, Wahid appointed Taufikurrahman as the party's leader in parliament.

Initially, relations between Wahid and Taufikurrahman were friendly, with Taufikurrahman defending Wahid's report in the parliament. However, at the beginning of 2008, during a split between Abdurrahman Wahid and deputy speaker from PKB Muhaimin Iskandar, Taufikurrahman sided with Muhaimin and registered himself as a candidate for the People's Representative Council from Muhaimin's side. Muhaimin won control of the party in late 2008, but Taufikurrahman failed to be reelected.

Upon his retirement from the People's Representative Council, Taufikurrahman became active in Nahdlatul Ulama. He also continued his teaching career and wrote several books about education.

=== Death ===
Saleh died on 20 January 2023 in Surabaya, at age 73. He was buried two days later.
