= Tawfiq Fakhouri =

Jordanian banker and entrepreneur (1935–2020)

- Born: 1935; Jaba', Jerusalem
- Died: 2020 (aged 84–85); Amman
- Occupations: Banker and entrepreneur

Tawfiq Fakhouri (Arabic: توفيق فاخوري; 1935–2020) was a Jordanian banker and entrepreneur. He was the founder and former executive chairman of Bank of Jordan.

== Biography ==
Fakhouri was born in 1935 in Jaba', Jerusalem. As a result of the Israeli occupation, Fakhouri and his family were forced emigration from his hometown in Palestine to Jordan. In 1952, he moved to Saudi Arabia and started his career in 1955, when he received his first position with a contracting company. In 1957 Fakhouri founded his first company in Saudi Arabia, Al Eqbal for Trading and Contracting. In 1986, he collaborated with 3M, a major American company, to reposition the company within the road traffic industry. In 1960 he founded the Bank of Jordan. In 1987, Fakhouri was elected the executive chairman of the board, a position he held for 20 years, until 2007. In 1992, he founded the International Tobacco and Cigarette Co., which merged with Al Eqbal Investment Co. in 2000. Fakhouri established an investment company in Spain that specializes in oil logistics, transportation and distribution. Fakhouri died on Thursday, November 26, 2020, at the age of 85.
