= Buzovna =

- Municipality
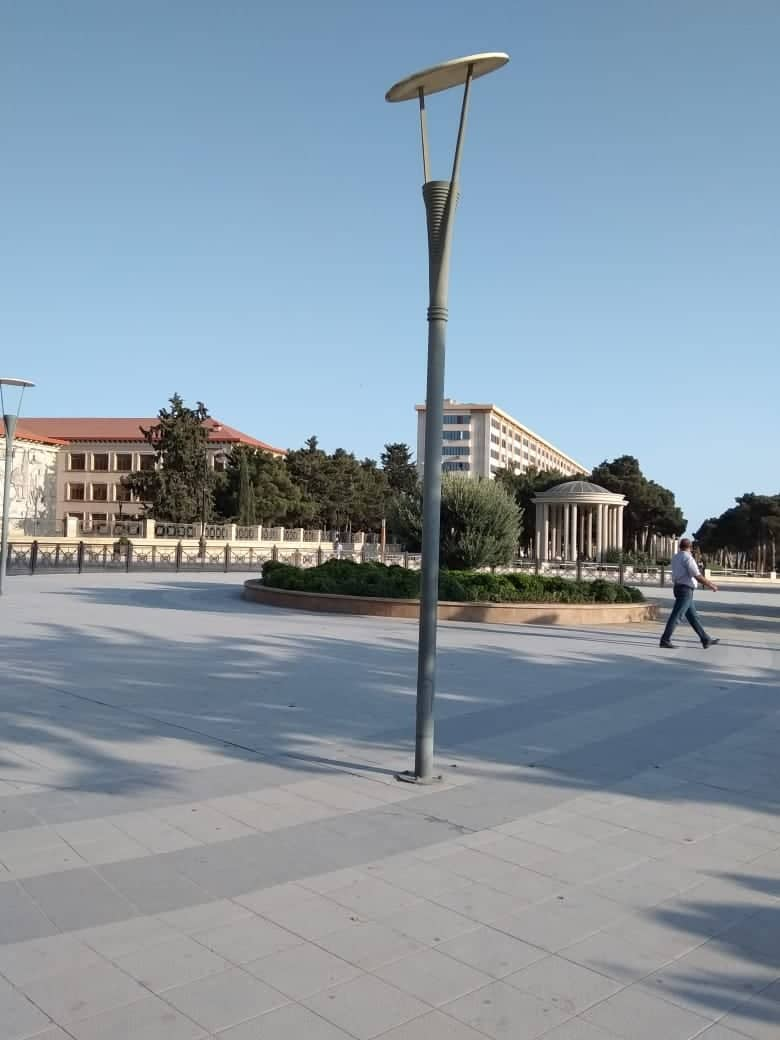

- Location within Azerbaijan
- Coordinates: 40°30′58″N 50°06′59″E
- Country: Azerbaijan
- City: Baku
- Raion: Əzizbəyov

Population (2008)
  - Total: 26,283
- Time zone: UTC+4 (AZT)
  - Summer (DST): UTC+5 (AZT)

Buzovna (also, Busovny, Busowny, Buzouvna, and Buzovny) is a settlement and municipality in Baku, Azerbaijan. It has a population of 26,283.

== Transport ==
Driving from Baku to Buzovna typically takes about 27–41 minutes covering a distance of approximately 32–40 km. The route, often accessed via the rehabilitated 12.7 km Buzovna-Mardakan-Gala motorway (completed in 2016), offers a 4-lane, modern road connection with established lighting. Options include driving, taxis, or buses, with 138+ hotels nearby.

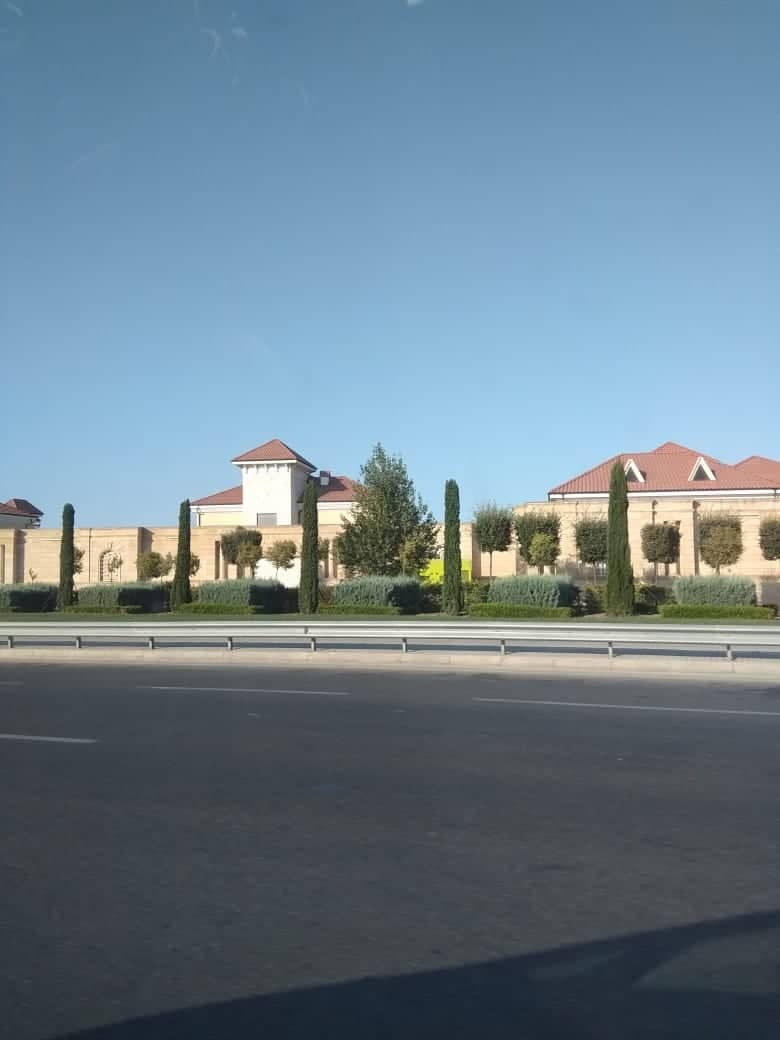
Trees along a road in Buzovna.

== Notable natives ==
- Nuraddin Ibrahimov — National Hero of Azerbaijan
- Sidgi Ruhulla — Azerbaijani Soviet actor, People's Artist of USSR (1949)
- Aykhan Abbasov — Azerbaijani manager

== Photos ==
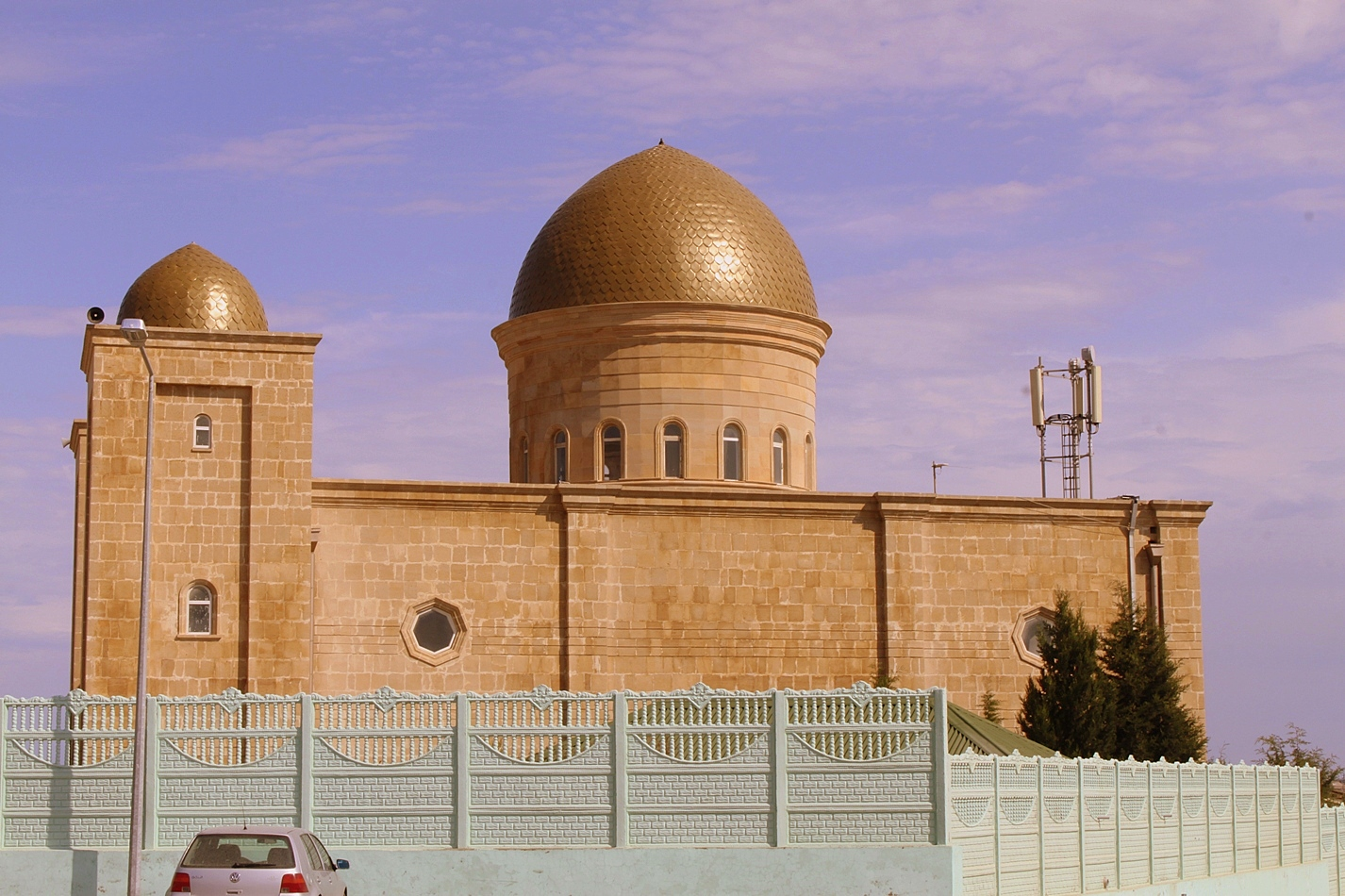
"Ali Ayaghi" pir.

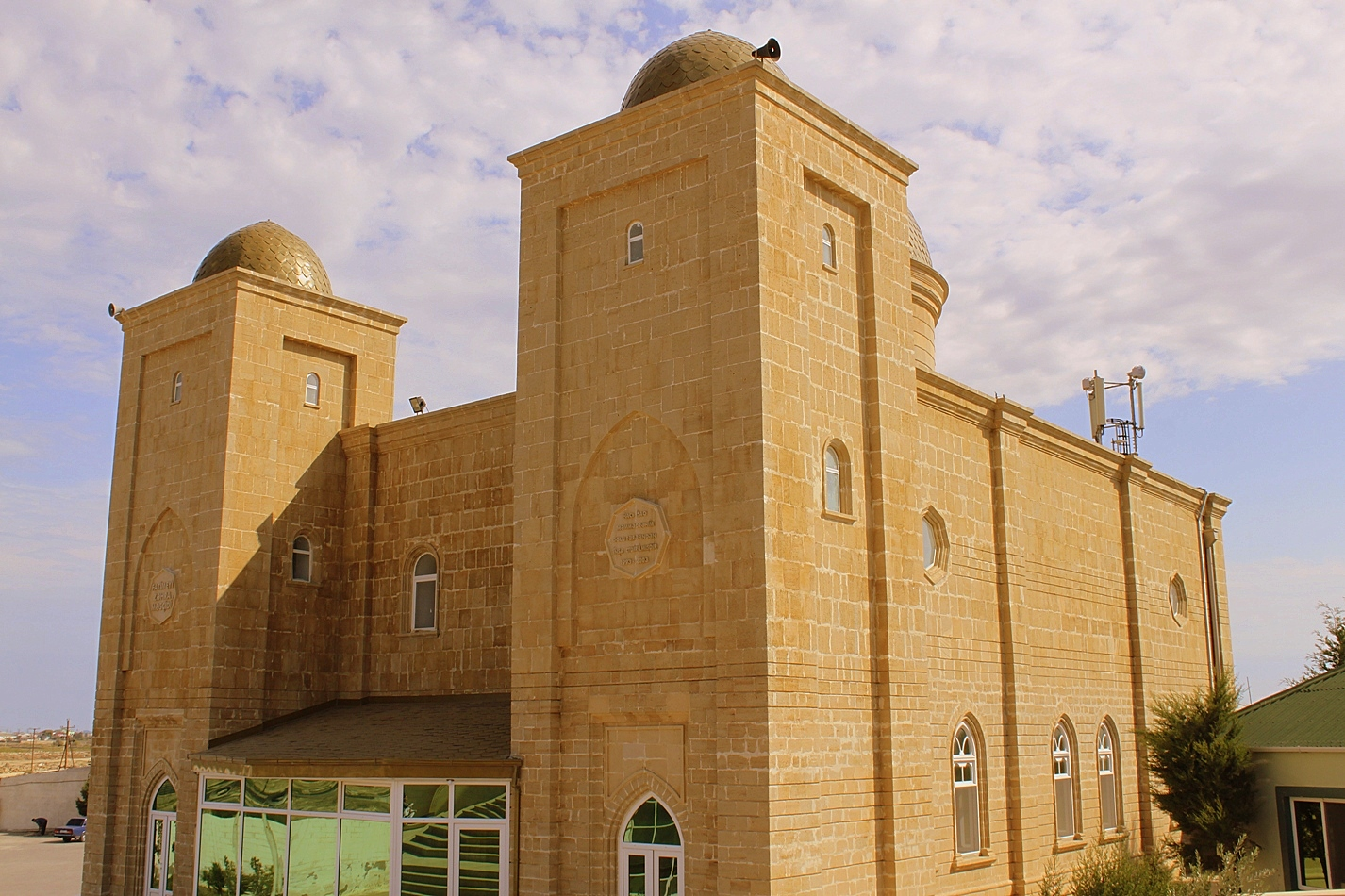
"Ali Ayaghi" pir.

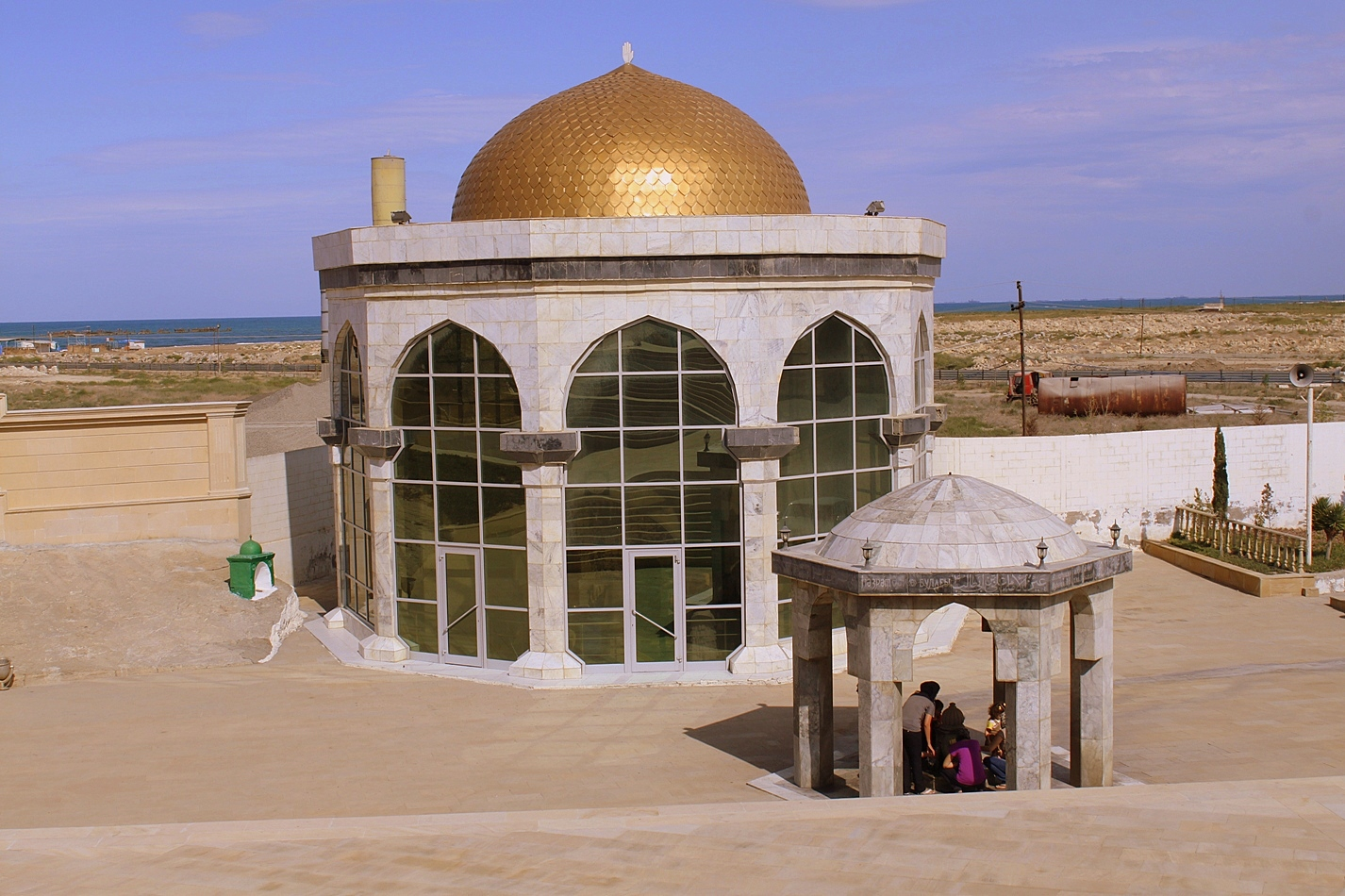
"Ali Ayaghi" pir.

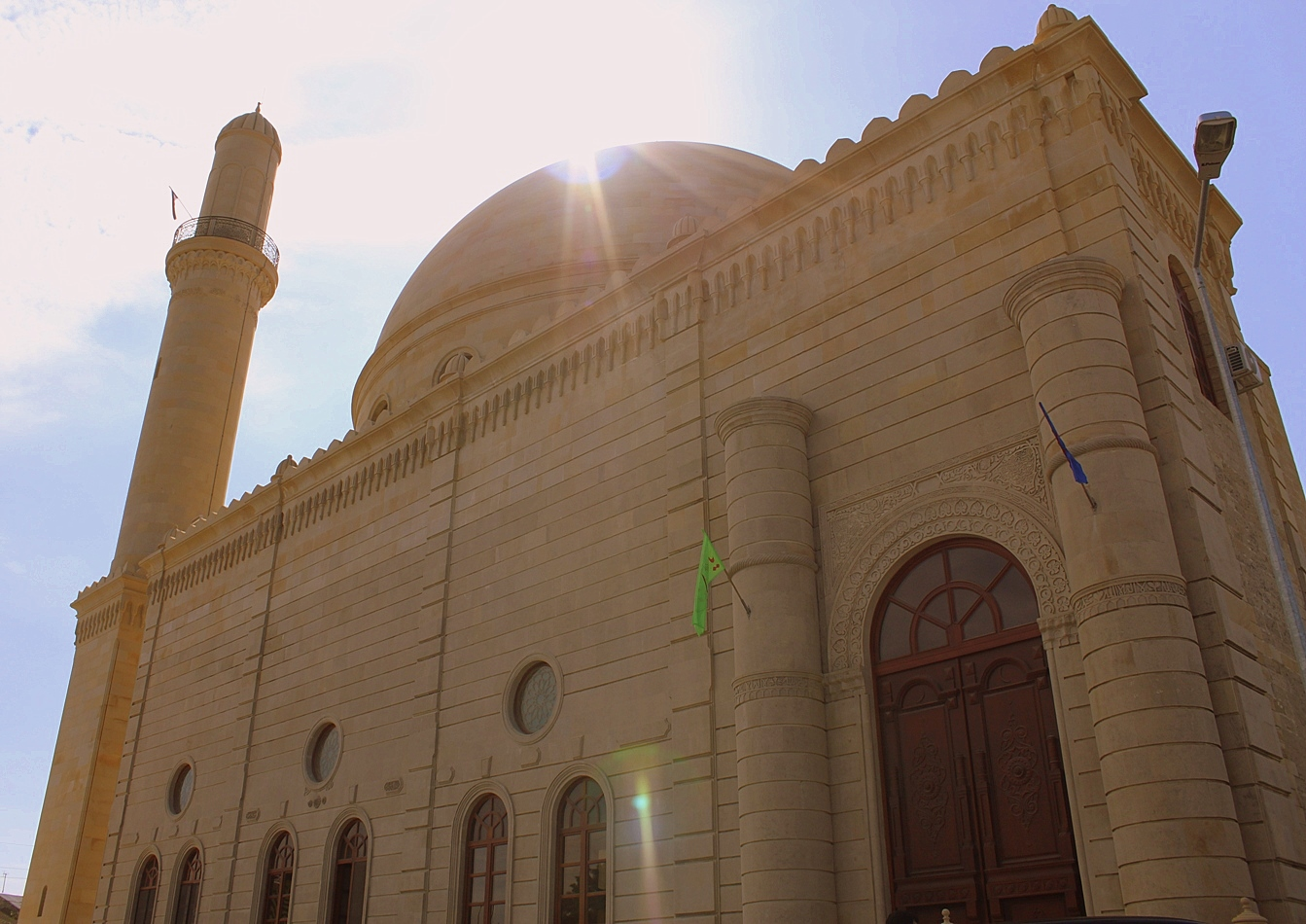
Friday mosque of Ali ibn Abu Talib, Buzovna.

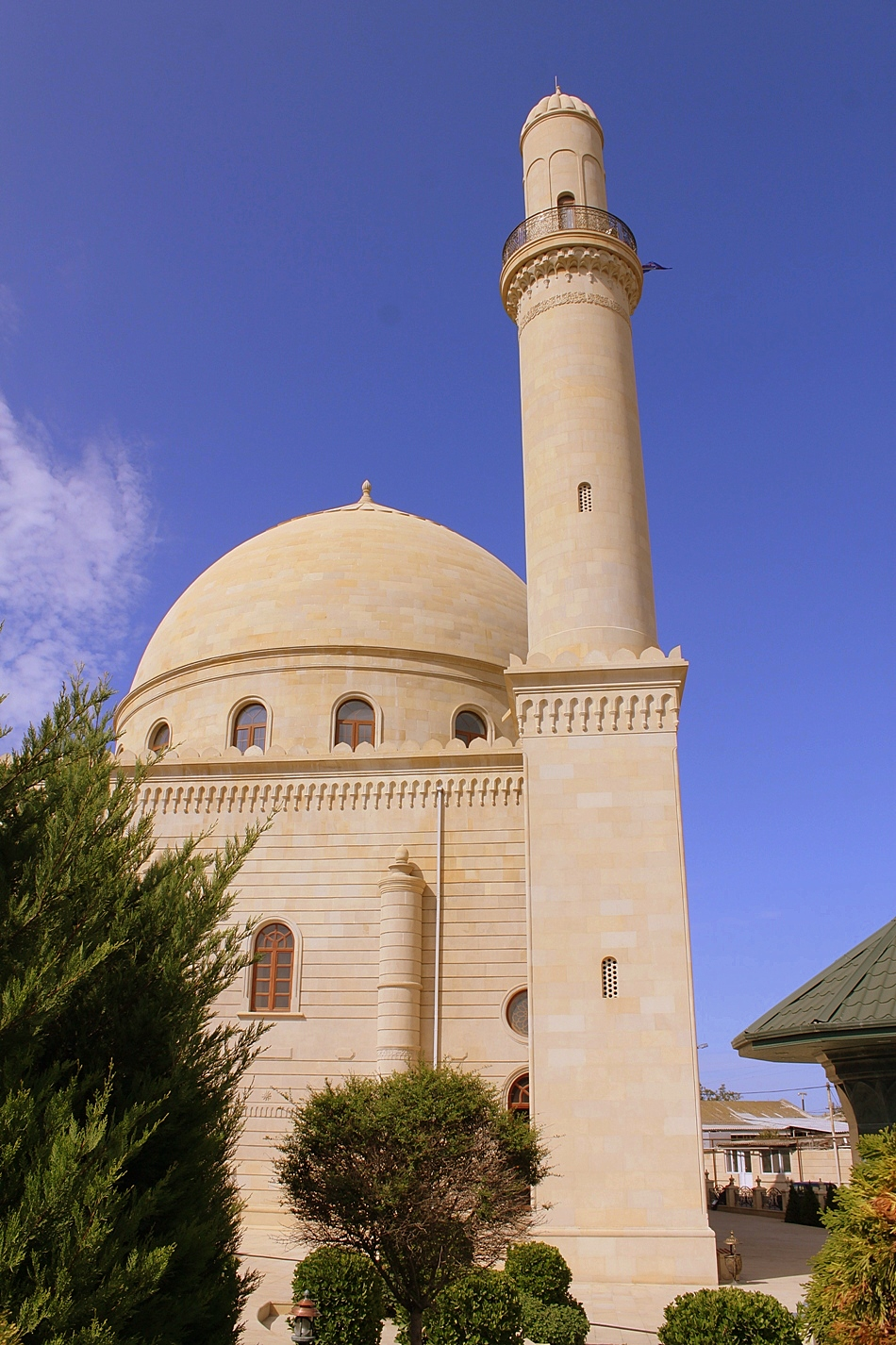
Friday mosque of Ali ibn Abu Talib, Buzovna.

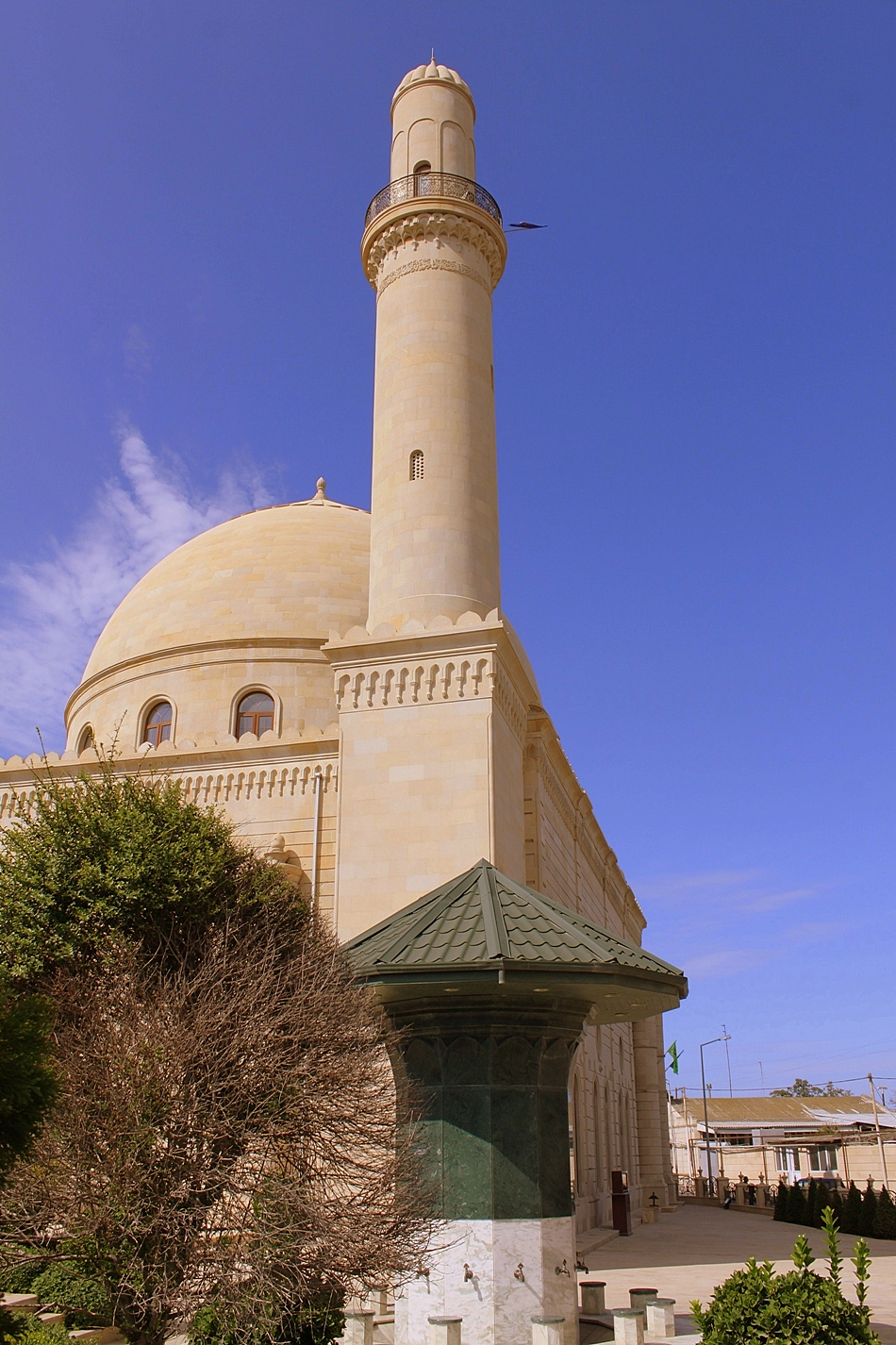
Friday mosque of Ali ibn Abu Talib, Buzovna.

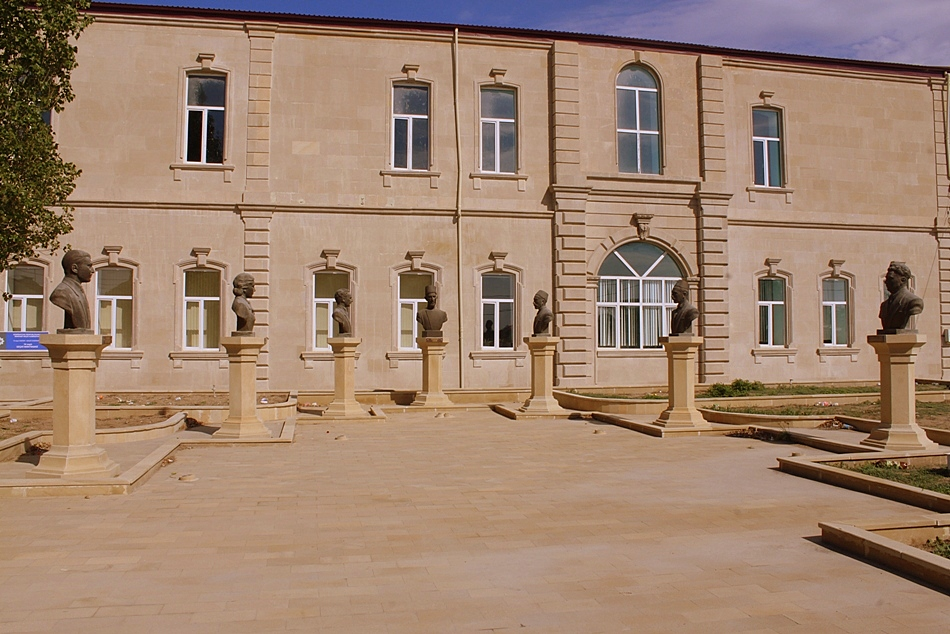
A school in Buzovna.

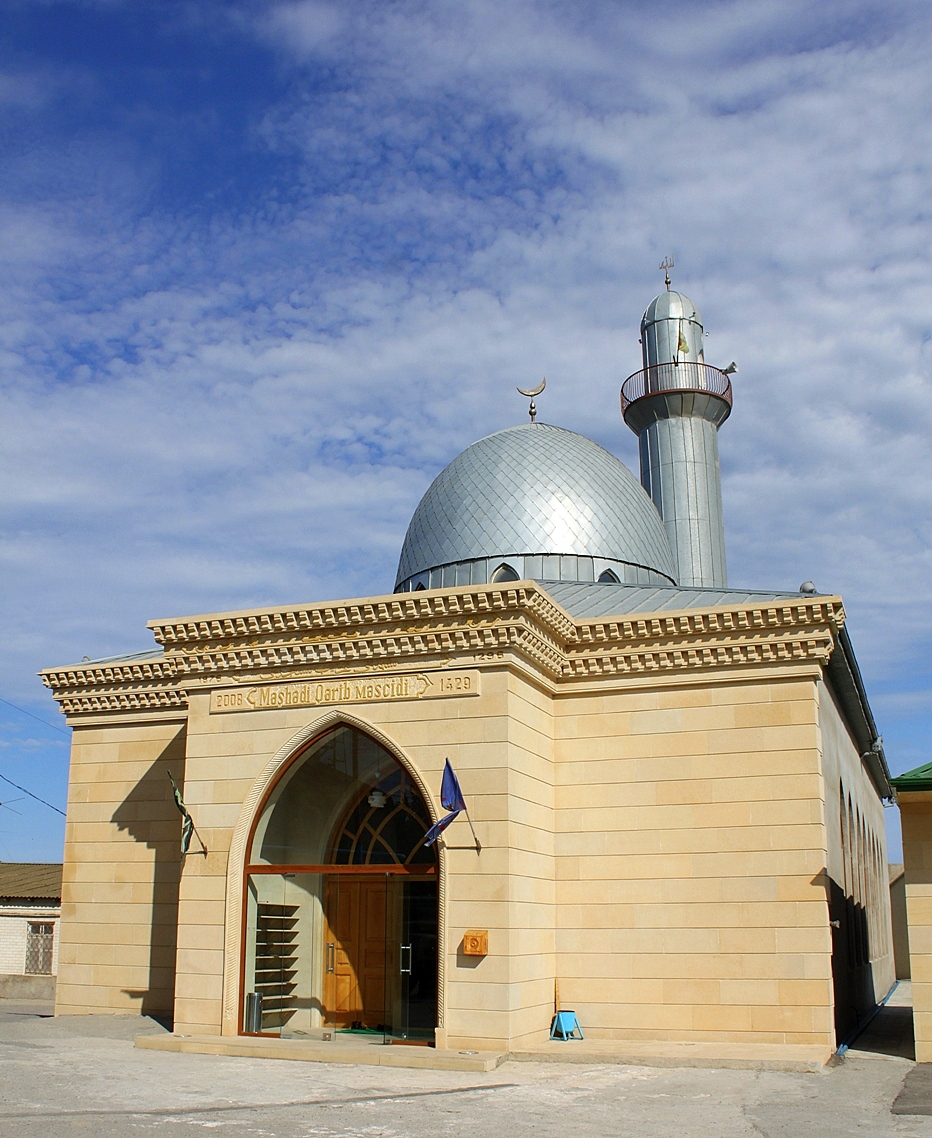
Meshadi Garib mosque, 1429.

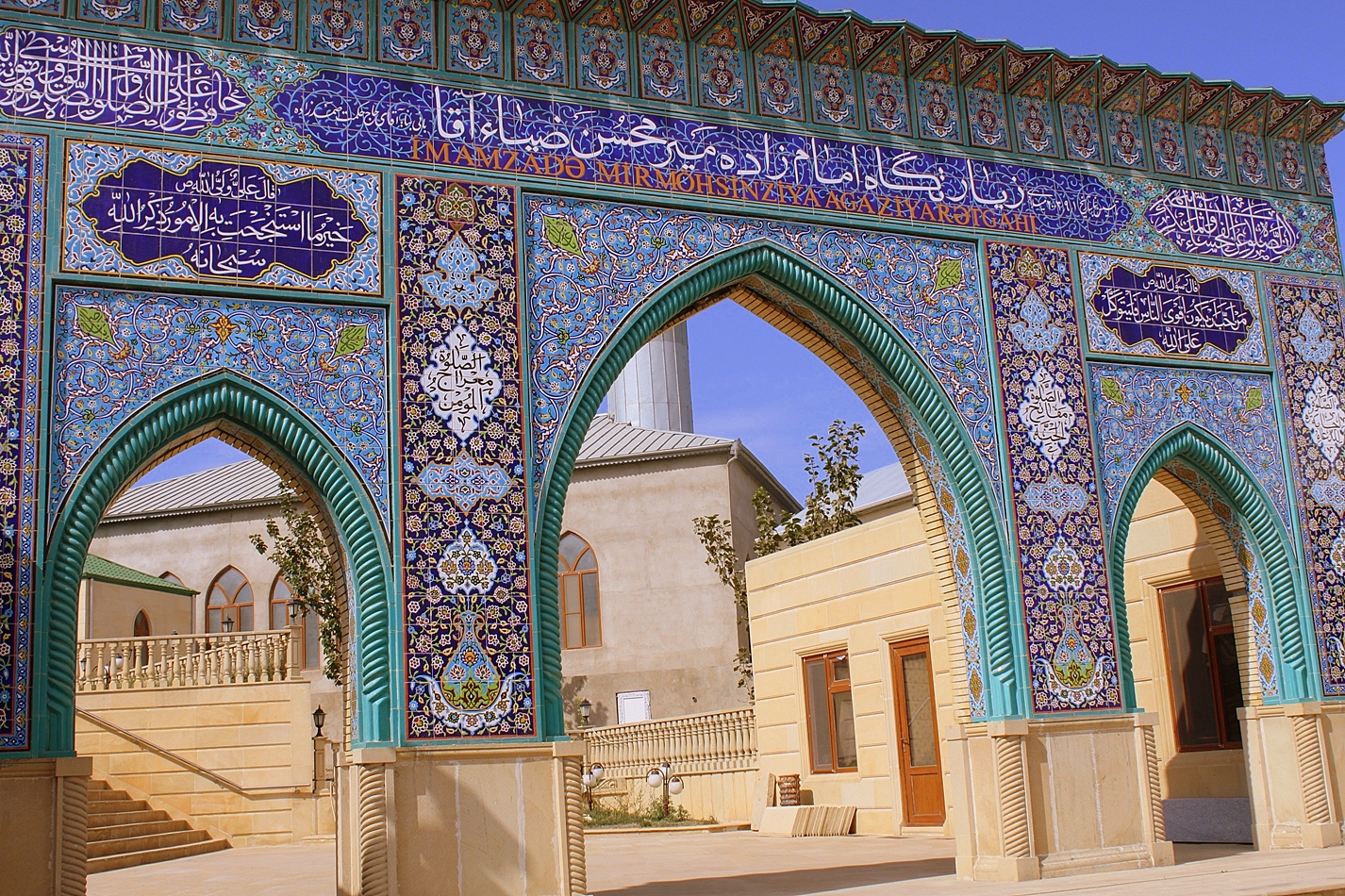
Gates of the pir in Buzovna.

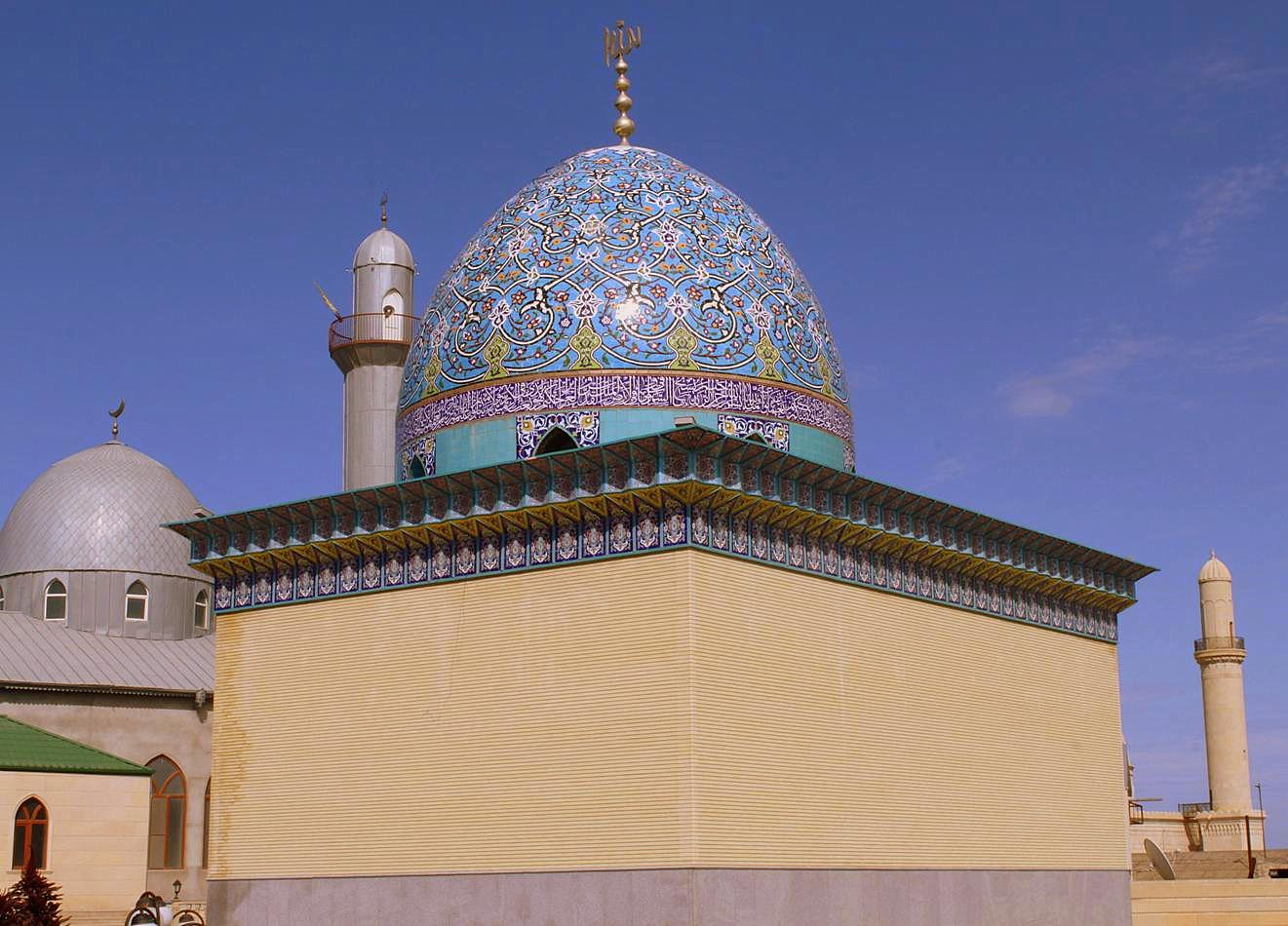
A pir in Buzovna.

== Ancient cemeteries in Buzovna ==
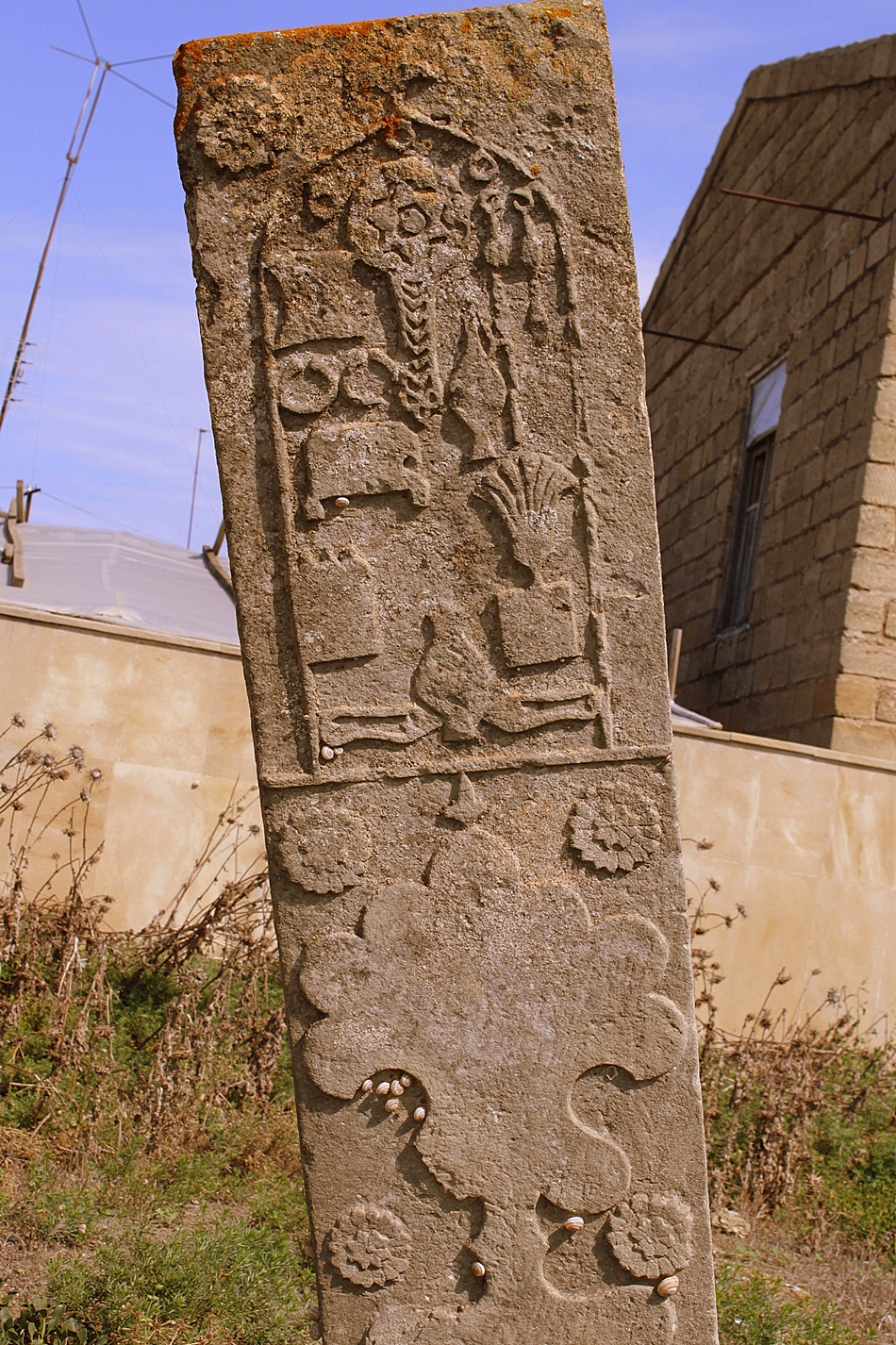

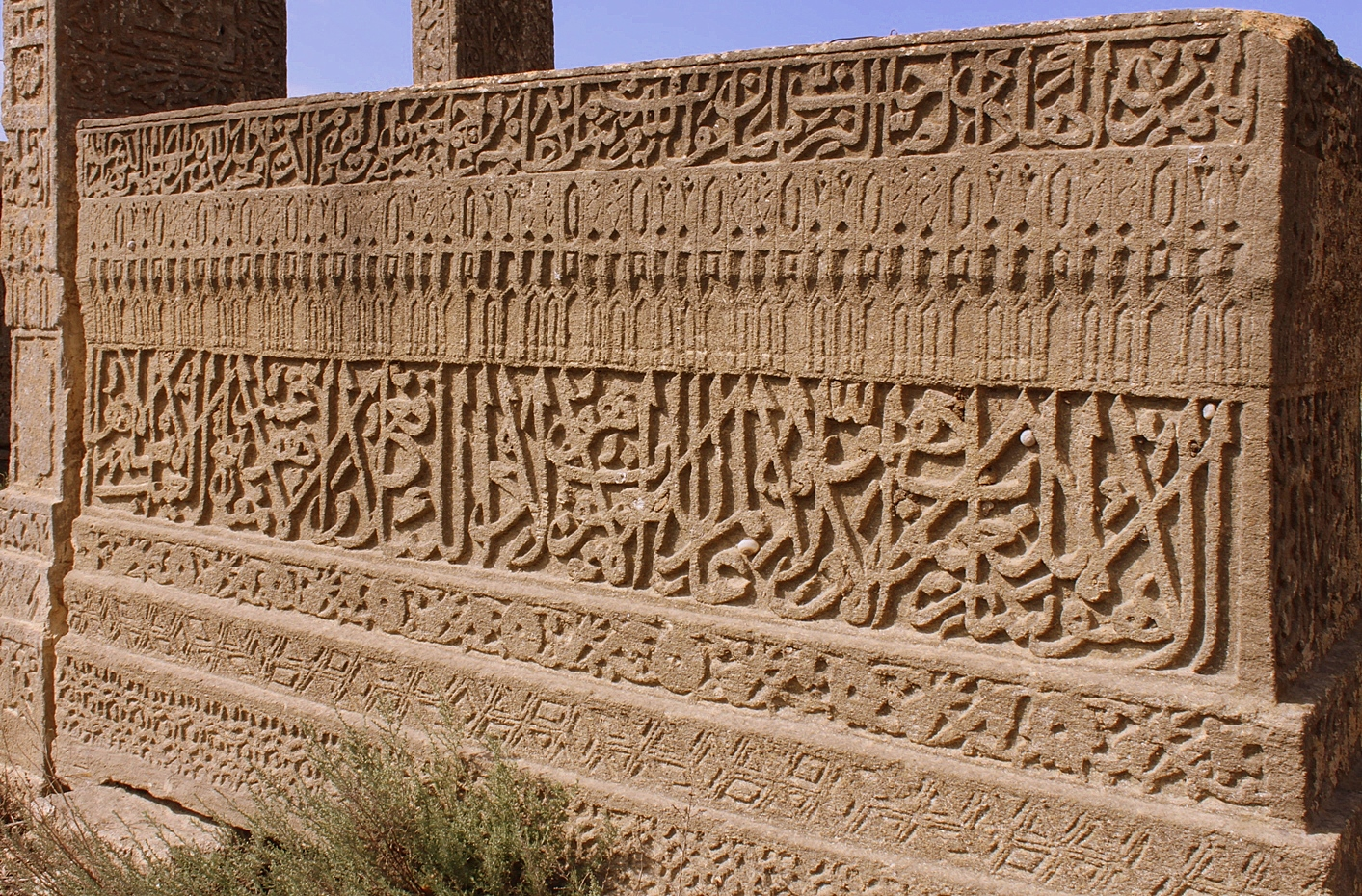

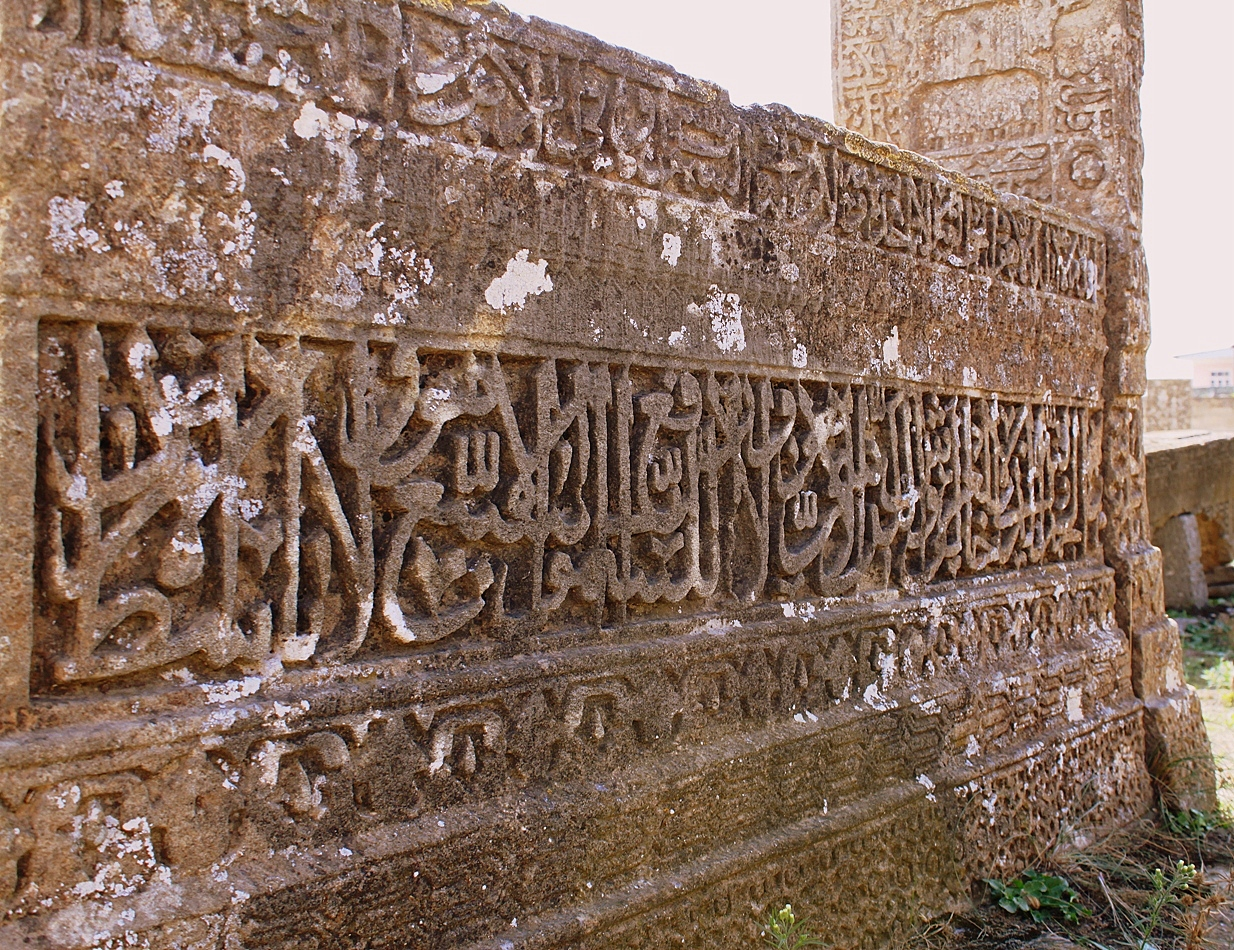

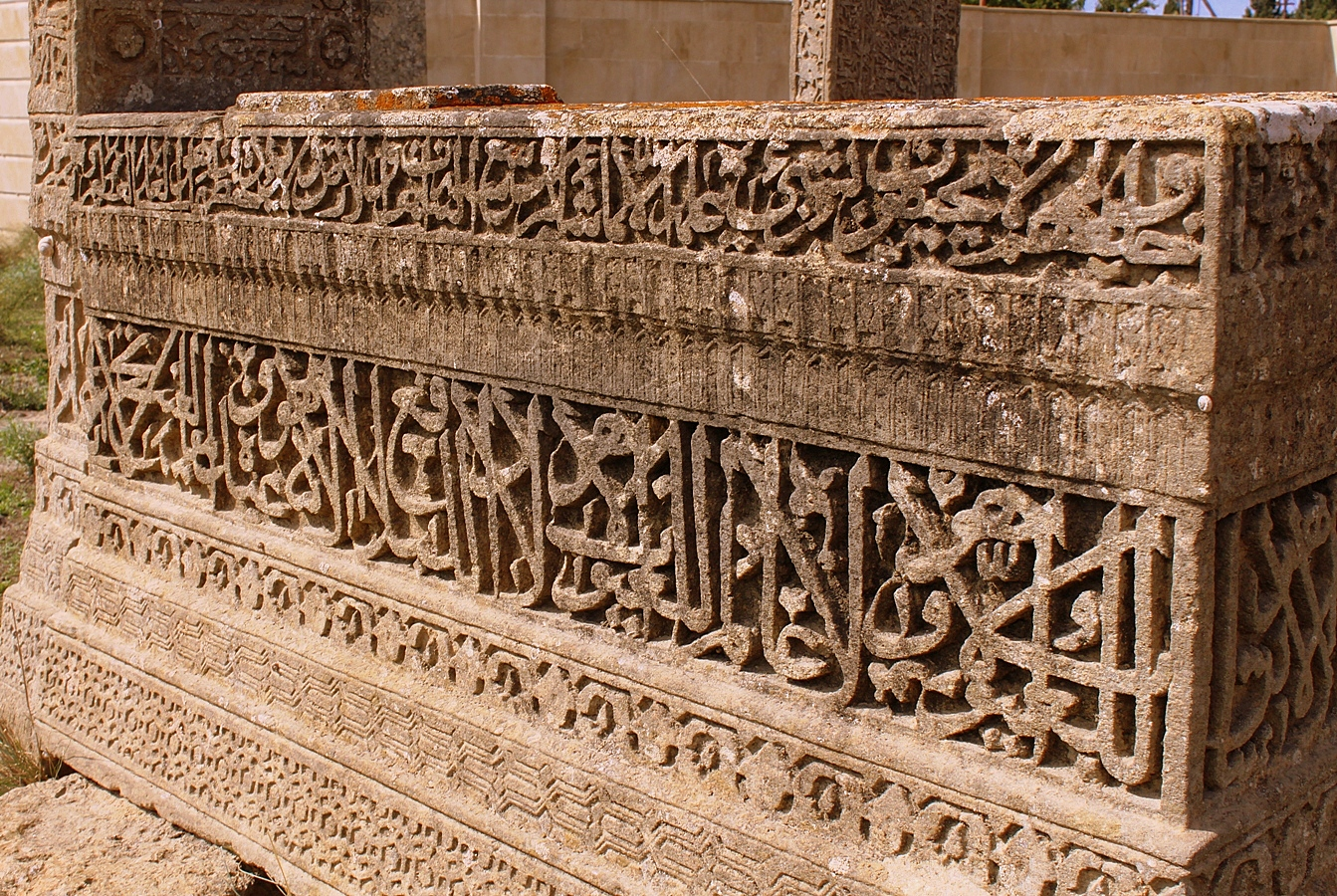

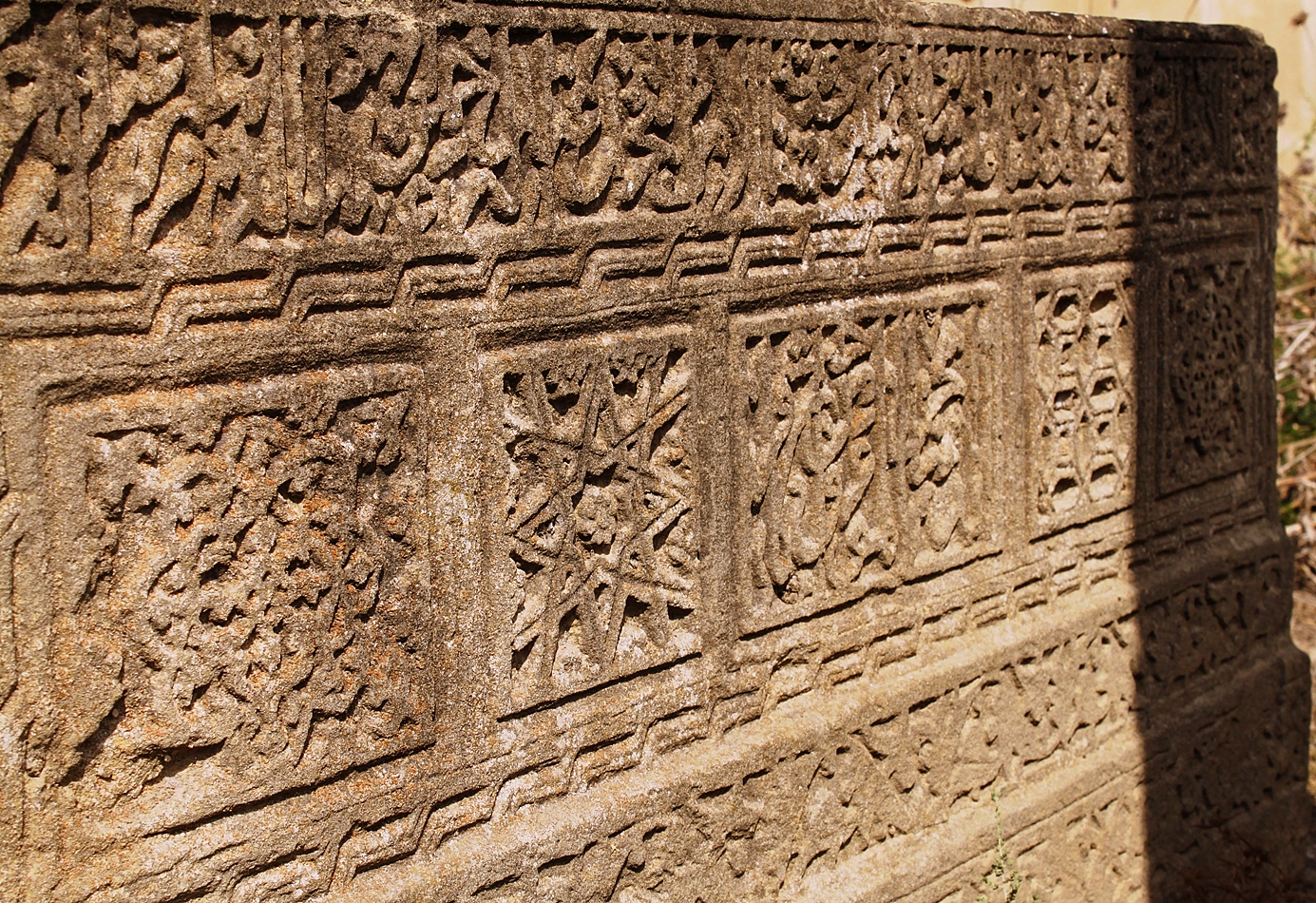
