= Tofig Ahmadov =

Azerbaijani politician and engineer

Tofig Ahmadov Tofiq Əhmədov

Minister of Rural Construction
- In office December 7, 1965 – June 30, 1971
- Preceded by: Position established
- Succeeded by: Saleh Hajiyev

First Deputy Minister of Construction
- In office January 16, 1962 – December 1965

Chairman of the State Committee for Construction and Architectural Affairs
- In office May 23, 1960 – January 16, 1962
- Preceded by: Hasan Majidov
- Succeeded by: Yagub Ismayilov

Personal details
- Born: May 22, 1926; Baku, Azerbaijan SSR, USSR
- Died: June 1990 (aged 64)
- Resting place: Second Alley of Honor
- Political party: CPSU
- Education: Azerbaijan Institute of Industry

Tofig Jahangir ogla Ahmadov (May 22, 1926 – June 1990) was an Azerbaijani politician and engineer who served as the Minister of Rural Construction of the Azerbaijan SSR (1966–1971) and chairman of the State Committee for Construction and Architectural Affairs of the Azerbaijan SSR (1960–1962).

== Biography ==
Tofig Ahmadov was born on May 22, 1926, in Baku (according to another source, in 1924 in the current-day Salyan district) to a family of servant. In 1948, he graduated from the Faculty of Architecture and Construction of the Azerbaijan Institute of Industry. Since that year, he was a foreman, head of the construction site, engineer, chief engineer, head of the trust in Dashkasan.

From 1958 to 1960, Tofig Ahmadov worked as a chief engineer and deputy head of the Construction Department of the National Economic Council of the Azerbaijan SSR. In 1960–1962, he was the chairman of the State Committee for Construction and Architectural Affairs of the Council of Ministers of the Azerbaijan SSR, and from 1962, he worked as the First Deputy Minister of Construction of the Azerbaijan SSR. In 1965–1971, he was the Minister of Rural Construction of the Azerbaijan SSR, and then the deputy chairman of the State Planning Committee of the Azerbaijan SSR. In the last 15 years of his life, he worked as the director of the "Uzvitekhtikinti" trust of the Ministry of Construction of the Azerbaijan SSR, the "Azerkommuntemirtikinti" trust of the Ministry of Housing and Communal Economy, and was the deputy chairman of the Baku City Planning Commission of the executive committee of the Baku City Council of People's Deputies.

Tofig Ahmadov was a member of the Communist Party of the Soviet Union since 1954. He was elected a member of the Central Committee at the 25th congress of the Communist Party of Azerbaijan, and was a candidate member of the Central Committee at the 27th and 28th congresses. Tofig Ahmadov was elected deputy of the Supreme Soviet of the Azerbaijan SSR on the sixth and seventh convocations. He was awarded the orders of Red Banner of Labour, and Badge of Honour, as well as medals of the USSR. In 1962, he was awarded the honorary title "Honored Engineer of Azerbaijan SSR".

Tofig Ahmadov died in June 1990. He was buried in the Second Alley of Honor.
