= Javad Mirjavadov =

- Cavad Mircavadov
- Born: January 19, 1923; Baku, Baku uezd, Azerbaijan SSR, TSFSR, USSR
- Died: June 24, 1992 (aged 69); Tiraspol, Moldova
- Resting place: Baku
- Awards: Distinguished Artist of the Azerbaijan SSR

Javad Mirjavadov (January 19, 1923, Baku – June 24, 1992, Tiraspol) was an Azerbaijani painter. He was honored as a Distinguished Artist of the Azerbaijan SSR in 1988. After the artist's death, numerous solo exhibitions of his work were held in various foreign countries. His works are kept in the Azerbaijan National Art Museum, the Azerbaijan State Art Gallery, the Moscow Museum of Eastern Peoples, as well as in many private galleries and collections. Currently, 17 of Javad Mirjavadov's works are preserved in the collection of the Azerbaijan State Art Gallery.

In the annotation of his solo exhibition held in 1989 at the Museum of Eastern Peoples in Moscow, Javad Mirjavadov was referred to as the founder of modern Azerbaijani painting.

== Life ==
Javad Mirjavadov was born on January 19, 1923, in Baku. He spent his childhood in the Fatmayi village of Baku. In 1938, at the age of 15, he started working as a poster artist at the "Azerbaijan" cinema, under the guidance of the painter Zarubin. Mirjavadov was responsible for all the cinema's poster works. After working there for a year, he was arrested for being late for work and spent 6 months in detention at the Bayil prison.

From 1941 to 1949, Mirjavadov received his initial art education at an art school in Baku. During his school years, he became acquainted with a book containing the works of Paul Cézanne, and after completing his education there in 1949, he traveled to Leningrad (now Saint Petersburg) with the goal of seeing Cézanne's works at the Hermitage Museum. He lived in Leningrad from 1949 to 1954, where he worked as a restorer at the State Hermitage Museum. His purpose was to become familiar with the paintings exhibited at the Hermitage. For this purpose, the artist worked there for 5 years. Additionally, the young artist frequently traveled to Moscow and had the opportunity to meet some of the prominent Soviet painters who were followers of Cézanne. One of these artists was Pyotr Petrovich Konchalovsky, who laid the foundation for the " Bubnoviy Valet" artistic group and the literary union.

In 1954, after returning to Baku from Leningrad, Mirjavadov began to experiment with unconventional materials for representational art for the next 10 years. He used materials such as metal, stone, sand, bitumen, tar, and cement. Later, along with his friends, the artist spent some time in Gobustan engaging in creative activities. After living in Buzovna in isolation for 10 years, Mirjavadov returned to Baku in 1966.

He married Lyubov Mirjavadova, and they had a son named Xazri from this marriage.

Javad Mirjavadov was an admirer of Gabriel García Márquez. "One Hundred Years of Solitude" and "Chronicle of a Death Foretold" were books he repeatedly read. His life partner speaks about his fondness for García Márquez in her memories.

It was the year 1987. We were at home when a call came in from Warsaw. The voice on the other end was that of Chinghiz Aitmatov. As Javad was not in good health, I answered the call. Chinghiz said that in the coming days, Gabriel García Márquez would be coming to Warsaw, and they would be flying to Moscow together. He suggested, "You also come and I introduce Javad to Márquez."

Chinghiz knew about Javad's love for Márquez, as their creative worlds were alike, and both of them created mythical images.I explained that Javad wasn't in good health, so we couldn't make the trip. Javad decided that if he couldn't have the opportunity to meet his favorite writer, he would at least send him one of his paintings, and he did just that.

"Another one of his paintings titled "Yanğın" (Fire) had been received by the writer Arthur Miller.”

In 1992, he died while on a journey aboard the Copenhagen-Moscow train.

Javad Mirjavadov was the brother of the artist Tofiq Mirjavadov.

== Creativity ==
Javad Mirjavadov is recognized by many as founder of the contemporary direction in Azerbaijani painting. He is one of the most prominent innovators in the Azerbaijani art school. Javad Mirjavadov's earliest work in the realm of painting is recorded in the year 1967, and it is titled "Yırtıcı" (Predator). In this work, we see a sheep with its legs wrapped, lying on its back, and nearby, there is a creature, laughing non-human with a baglike body. In this piece, the allegorical approach the artist takes toward society and its surrounding environment becomes evident.

The decision by the artist to return from Buzovna to Baku is considered the beginning of a new phase in his painting. Despite the relatively small number of works he created in Buzovna, they hold an important place in Mirjavadov's oeuvre. These works were primarily graphic illustrations drawn on paper. Some were done with intricate pens, while others were executed with black ink. The Kyrgyz writer Chinghiz Aitmatov had the following to say about Mirjavadov's graphic works:

Mirjavadov dramatized the devil in his works, depicting it in a powerful and unique scale. Through his studies, Javad was not only able to determine the silhouette but also separate color from form, which gave his works an extraordinary majesty. Perhaps that's why he reserved a special place for his characters in his canvases. He had the ability to create volume for objects and figures in his works, making them appear as if they were emerging from the canvas. At the same time, he demanded other forms and distances in art. The unique modulation of the colors he used is inherent in nature itself. His departure from rules, space, and boundaries is quite apparent.

Javad Mirjavadov's engagement in the field of sculpture art during those years is evident in the "volumetric-plastic" analysis of objects in his painting works. Some examples of his graphic works include Mavi kompozisiya (Blue Composition) from 1957 (100x80 cm), "Mistik"(Mystic) from 1960 (200x150 cm), Heykəltəraşlıq üçün eskiz (Sketch for Sculpture) from 1958 (150x150cm), Notr-Dam(Notre-Dame) from 1958 (280x180 cm), Texno Erotik from 1958 (45x45 cm),"Yük atı" (The Load) from 1959 (100x80 cm), "Fizioloji niyyət" (Physiological Intention) from 1959 (40x30 cm), and "Bədənin quruluşu" (The Structure of the Body) from 1960 (200x160 cm).

Mirjavadov's entirely intuitive and instinctive creation of "absurd images" forms a completeness within his own value system. His depictions primarily resemble grotesque, mythological figures, but in contrast to traditional mythology, the artist gave them meaning that suited his own world. He portrayed the "grotesque" figures as both benevolent and ruthless, courageous, and sometimes fearful. The artist combined all the base and shameful aspects that could exist in a person, remaining true to his personal understanding while creating his works.

When the compositions created with the "grotesque" figure are examined from various angles, they appear to be portraying indecency, games, and frivolities. Javad portrayed these powerful "grotesques&quot; as animalistic figures, often resembling beasts. Works such as "Divlərin hiylələri" (The Tricks of Grotesques) from 1980 (220x240 cm), "Arena" from 1981(220x260 cm), "Ehtiras" (Passion) from 1983 (160x200 cm), "Ölümlə dialoq" (Dialog with Death) from 1976 (100x80 cm), and "Qasırğa" (Tempest) from 1984 (300x400 cm) fall under this category.

Another recurring figure in C. Mirjavadov's creativity is the woman. In these depictions, the woman is portrayed as benevolent, patient, beautiful, intelligent, and sensitive. His works such as "Toy" (Wedding) from 1973 (130x180 cm), "Şaman-Qadın" (Shaman Woman) from 1983 (70x80 cm), "Sakitlik və sərinlikdə" (Calm and Serenity) from 1984 (80x60 cm), "Çılpaq qadın" (Nude Woman) from 1984 (90x70 cm), "İris ilə qız" (Girl with Iris) from 1986, "Uzanan qadın" (Reclining Woman) from 1987 (100x120 cm), "Ümid işığı" (Light of Hope) from 1982 (200x250 cm), and many other works portray various aspects of the woman's character.

In some of his works, Javad Mirjavadov has skillfully used the same schema and colors to present the narrative of a particular event or aspect of life each time, following the content. For example, his works "Şubanada" from 1984 (75x80 cm) and "Naxır" from 1986 (60x80 cm), along with compositions like " Dəvə üstündə" (On a Camel), are examples of these narrative works.

Javad Mirjavadov also created works where he spent several years developing them. In his work titled "Müxtəlifliyin vahidlik panoramı" (The Panorama of Unity in Diversity) from 1985 to 1987, the artist aimed to highlight the common problems and flaws of humanity, using as examples the faces of various ethnic groups and tribes. This work is part of a series that includes "Əsrin himni" (Hymn of the Century) and "Şərq miniatürü mövzusunda improvizasiya" (Improvisation on the Theme of Eastern Miniatures). The series of works within "Şərq miniatürü mövzusunda improvizasiya" include "Atlılar" (Horsemen) from 1984, "Lüt-üryan" (Looted) from 1984, "Günəşli atlı" (Sunlit Horsemen) from 1984, "Sarayda" (In the Palace) from 1985, as well as "Gəzinti" (Stroll) from 1981 and "Uşaq arabası" (Baby Carriage) from 1985, all created in this style.

Two works hold a special place in the artist's oeuvre: "Məxfi gecə" (Secret Night) from 1982 and "Ümid işığı" (Light of Hope) from 1982.

Renowned Soviet art historian, author of numerous works on Russian and European art history, M.V. Alpatov, wrote about Mirjavadov:

Mirjavadov is a painter with great strength and a vast breath. There is no single recognized style in his works

== Exhibitions ==
In 1975, Javad Mirjavadov was accepted as a member of the Soviet Union Artists' Union (SSRI Rəssamlıq İttifaqı). However, Soviet art institutions declared him persona non grata and this situation remained unchanged in the subsequent years. Mirjavadov occasionally attempted to exhibit his work in state institutions such as the Ministry of Culture and the Azerbaijan Communist Party Central Committee, and even initiated efforts to organize solo exhibitions within the Artists' Union, but he received rejection each time.

In 1987, the first exhibition of the artist was held at the Vajiha Samadova Gallery. The next exhibition took place in Moscow. In 1991, he had a solo exhibition in Copenhagen. In the annotation of his solo exhibition in 1989 at the Museum of the Peoples of the East in Moscow, Javad Mirjavadov was referred to as the pioneer of contemporary Azerbaijani painting.

In 1999, during an exhibition of Javad's works in the "Hyörning" museum in Denmark, Dr. Teddy Brunies, a professor of philosophy, wrote an article titled "The Shaman of Contemporary Art" in which he described the artist:

He resembled that peculiar creature with more wisdom in his hair. Throughout the centuries, Cavad's creations, born from the tough and powerful strokes of his brush, defied boundaries

During the exhibition's opening, Torben Tutusen, the artistic director of the "Hyörning" museum, stated:

Javad Mirjavadov was always a representative of the generation of painters who were always in opposition to the government during the Soviet era. Javad's art always penetrated the viewer, appealing to religious and forbidden topics. In his canvases, he challenged the very question of human existence. His works with such outrageous motifs that so aptly match his expressive style are beyond words.

After the artist's death, numerous individual exhibitions have been organized in many foreign countries. His works are kept in the National Art Museum of Azerbaijan, the Azerbaijan State Art Gallery, the Moscow Museum of Oriental Art, as well as in many private galleries and collections

In 2013, one of Javad Mirjavadov's works, titled "Journey to Mecca," from the series "Eastern Miniature Improvisation," was auctioned at the famous "Sotheby's" auction house. The value of the artwork was determined to be between 80,000 and 112,000 US dollars. This piece dates back to the years 1985-86 and was selected from a Scandinavian collector's private collection.

Additionally, in 2013, with the organization of the Ministry of Culture and Tourism, a 90th-anniversary exhibition of the artist was held at the National Art Museum of Azerbaijan . Currently, 17 of Javad Mirjavadov's works are preserved in the collection of the Azerbaijan State Art Gallery.
