= Jim Jeffers =

Australian rules footballer, born 1912

Personal information
- Full name: James Thackeray Jeffers
- Born: 9 November 1912; Oakleigh, Victoria
- Died: 22 January 1992 (aged 79)
- Height: 175 cm (5 ft 9 in)
- Weight: 73 kg (161 lb)

Playing career^{1}
Years	Club	Games (Goals)
1935	North Melbourne	2 (3)
- ^{1} Playing statistics correct to the end of 1935.

James Thackeray Jeffers (9 November 1912 – 22 January 1992) was an Australian rules footballer who played with North Melbourne in the Victorian Football League (VFL).
