= Arthur Cairns =

Australian rules footballer, born 1917

Personal information
- Full name: Arthur Cairns
- Born: 7 April 1917
- Died: 12 January 1992 (aged 74)
- Original team: Eaglehawk

Playing career^{1}
Years	Club	Games (Goals)
1942	St Kilda	2 (2)
- ^{1} Playing statistics correct to the end of 1942.

Arthur Cairns (7 April 1917 – 12 January 1992) was an Australian rules footballer who played for the St Kilda Football Club in the Victorian Football League (VFL).
