= Isgandar Javadov =

Azerbaijani footballer (born 1956)

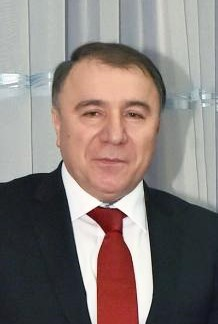
- Javadov in 2014

Personal information
- Full name: İsgəndər Cavad oğlu Cavadov
- Date of birth: 20 September 1956 (age 70)
- Place of birth: Baku, Azerbaijani SSR
- Height: 1.71 m (5 ft 7 in)
- Position: Striker

Senior career*
Years	Team	Apps	(Gls)
1977–1982	Neftchi Baku	109	(18)
1982–1983	Dynamo Moscow	4	(0)
1983–1988	Neftchi Baku	168	(35)
1989	FK Kyapaz Gäncä	5	(2)
1989	Nistru Chişinău	19	(6)
- * Club domestic league appearances and goals

Isgandar Javad ogly Javadov (Russian: Искендер Джавад-оглы Джавадов; born 20 September 1956) is an AzerbaijanI former professional footballer who played as a striker.

== Club career ==
Javadov made his professional debut in the Soviet Top League in 1977 for Neftchi Baku. He played 2 games and scored 1 goal in the 1982–83 UEFA Cup for Dynamo Moscow.

== Personal ==
Javadov is the uncle of Azerbaijani international football player Vagif Javadov, whilst his brother Füzuli Javadov was also football player.

On September 19, 2026, he was awarded the Honorary Diploma of the President of the Republic of Azerbaijan for many years of fruitful activity in the development and promotion of Azerbaijani football.
