= Tamirace Fakhoury =

Lebanese-German writer and academic

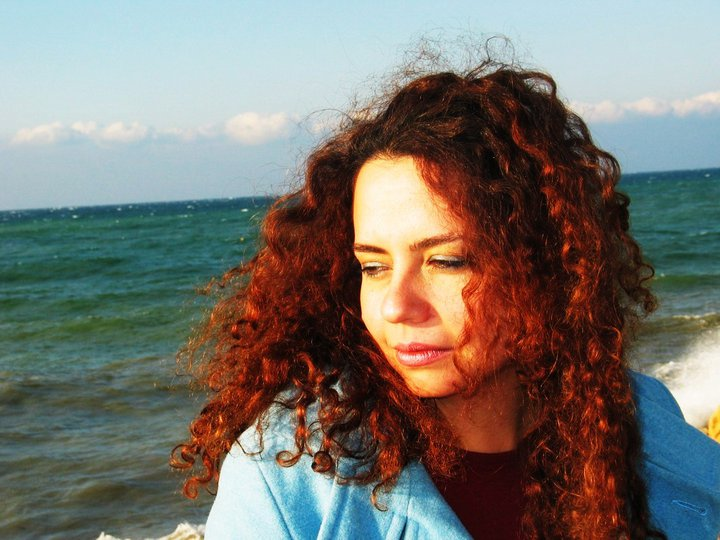
Tamirace Fakhoury

Tamirace Fakhoury is a Lebanese-German writer and academic born in Beit Chabab, Mount Lebanon.

== Biography ==
Born on November 28, 1975, Tamirace published her first book The country of the Emperor and the Lost Child at the age of nine. Then, throughout the years, she published four books in French at Dar An Nahar, Beirut. (Aubades, 1996; Contre-marées, 2000; Poème absent, 2004; Hémisphères, 2008). Her poems are published in various Arab and Francophone journals and anthologies in Lebanon, Europe and Canada.

Selected for Les Belles Étrangères in France in 2007, Tamirace writes poetry that captures overlapping conflicts as well as fragmented geographies and identities in post-war societies.

Tamirace holds a Ph.D. in political science from the University of Freiburg in Germany. She completed a research fellowship at the European University Institute in Florence, Italy. She was also a visiting scholar at the University of California campus located in Berkeley, California. Tamirace earned the Alexander von Humboldt Fellowship in 2014/2015 at the German Institute of Global and Area Studies in Hamburg, Germany. From 2011 until 2020, She was a professor at the Lebanese American University in Byblos, Lebanon where she also served as the director of the Institute of Social Justice and Conflict Resolution. She later joined the Department of Politics and Society at Aalborg University in Denmark as a faculty member, and held a visiting Professorship at Sciences Po in Paris. Currently, she is an associate professor of International Politics and Conflict at the Fletcher School at Tufts University in the US. Her scholarly work is featured in several journals such as the International journal of Middle East Studies and Migration Studies. In her article La mémoire de la guerre et du conflit (The Memory of War and Conflict), published in Les Cahiers de Malagar, she explores how she discovered her calling as a writer.

== Selected bibliography ==
- Tamirace Fakhoury, in Les Orientales, Revue Cabaret, France, 2025.
- Tamirace Fakhoury, in Crépuscule – Anthologie – Poétesses libanaises contemporaines, 2024.
- Tamirace Fakhoury, Poème d’ici, L'Orient Le Jour, 2021.
- Tamirace Fakhoury, in Anthologie poétique francophone de voix féminines contemporaines, eds. Sabine Huynh, Andrée Lacelle, Angèle Paoli and Aurélie Tourniaire, Préface de Déborah Heissle, Voix d'encre, 2012
- Tamirace Fakhoury, in Douze écrivains libanais, Les Belles Étrangères, anthologie, Gallimard, verticales/phase deux, 2007.
- Tamirace Fakhoury, Hémisphères, éd. Dar An-Nahar, Beirut, 2008.
- Tamirace Fakhoury Poème absent, éd. Dar An-Nahar, 2004.
- Tamirace Fakhoury Contre-marées, éd. Dar-An-Nahar, 2000.
- Tamirace Fakhoury, Aubades, éd. Dar-An-Nahar, 1996.
- Tamirace Fakhoury, Le pays de l’Empereur et l’Enfant perdu, 1984.

== Selected publications in journals ==
- "Les Trois Temps", Arcade 64, Fall 2005, Canada
- "Poètes de service", La Page Blanche 36, September 2005, France
- "Textes poétiques », Exit 33, November 2003, Canada
- "Textes poétiques", 3Journal, March 2004, Schreibzentrum, Ph-Freiburg, Germany
- "La nuit ne s’ouvre que de l’intérieur", Les Hommes Sans Epaules, Cahiers littéraires 13/14, premier semestre 2003, France
- "Poèmes", Poésie Première 22, winter 2002, France
- "Poésies Vagabondages", Poésie 1 Le Cherche-Midi Editeur 28, December 2001, France
- "Dossier spécial sur la poésie libanaise", Supérieur Inconnu 13, January 1999, France

== Selected poetry appearances ==
- July 2001: Festival de Lodeve, France
- December 2006: Journées d’encre et d’exil, Centre Pompidou, Paris, France
- March 2007: Salon du livre Paris, Poéme absent, France.
- November 2007: Les Belles Etrangères, Paris, Bordeaux, Versailles, Marseille, Corsica, and Nantes, France.
- March 2008: Printemps des poètes, Versailles, France.
- April 2008: Printemps des poètes, Fiesole, Italy.
- September 2008: Centre Francois Mauriac, Malagar, Bordeaux in France.
- March 2009: Salon du livre, Paris, Hémisphères, France.
- March 2010: Festival Déclamons, "Café littéraire et intervention" at the University of Rennes 2 organized by "la Maison de poésie" in Rennes, France.
- April 2010: Journées du Liban à Eu, Normandy, France
- June 2010: festival de poésie, Genoa, Italy.
- March 2011: Reading at kaleidoscope, San Francisco, United States.
- June 2011: Versailles, Paris, France.
- July 2011: Voce Lontane Voce sorelle, Florence, Italy.
- November 2011: Beyrouth, Le salon du livre, recital poetique, leitmotif with Rita Bassil and Michele Gharios, Lebanon.
- December 2011: 300th celebration, Versailles, Paris, France.
