= Ministry of Social Affairs (Tunisia) =

- وزارة الشؤون الاجتماعية (Arabic)
- Minister; Issam Lahmar
- Member of: Government of Tunisia
- Reports to: Prime Minister
- Seat: Tunis, Tunisia
- Appointer: President of Tunisia
- Formation: 7 August 1947
- First holder: Fathi Zouhir
- Website: www.social.gov.tn

The Ministry of Social Affairs is a government ministry in Tunisia responsible for implementing the country's social policies, promoting social welfare, and overseeing social protection and security programs. Its headquarters are located on Avenue Bab Bnet in Tunis.

== History ==
Following the intense labor pressures of 1947, the French Protectorate administration issued Decree No. 1 on 7 August 1947 formally creating it under the name Ministry of Labour and Social Welfare. Following Tunisia's independence in 1956, it became the Ministry of Social Affairs.

== Responsibilities ==
The ministry's main responsibilities include:

1-Developing and implementing national social policies.

2-Overseeing social security and social insurance systems.

3-Regulating labour relations and occupational safety.

4-Supporting low-income families and vulnerable populations.

5-Promoting social solidarity and equal opportunities.

6-Supporting people with disabilities and individuals with special needs.

7-Coordinating social assistance programmes.

8-Supporting Tunisians living abroad.
