= Cornelis Kaimu =

Indonesian footballer

Personal information
- Full name: Cornelis Kaimu
- Date of birth: 20 May 1985 (age 41)
- Place of birth: Mappi, Indonesia
- Height: 1.85 m (6 ft 1 in)
- Position: Forward

Senior career*
| Years | Team | Apps | (Gls) |
| 2011–2012 | Persiba Bantul | 29 | (3) |
| 2013 | Perseman Manokwari | 23 | (12) |
| 2014–2016 | Persijap Jepara | 38 | (1) |
| 2018 | Persiba Balikpapan | 11 | (0) |

International career
| 2007 | Indonesia U 23 | | |
- * Club domestic league appearances and goals as of 00:47, 3 September 2014 (UTC)

Cornelis Kaimu (born 20 May 1985) is an Indonesian former footballer who currently plays as a forward.

== Career ==
=== Persijap Jepara ===
He scored his first goal for Persijap in a 1–0 win against Persik Kediri.
