= Füzuli Javadov =

Azerbaijani footballer (1950–2021)

Personal information
- Full name: Füzuli Cavad oğlu Cavadov
- Date of birth: 20 December 1950
- Place of birth: Baku, Azerbaijan SSR, Soviet Union
- Date of death: 11 April 2021 (aged 70)
- Place of death: Baku, Azerbaijan
- Height: 1.75 m (5 ft 9 in)
- Position: Defender

Youth career
- NQDU Leninneft Baku

Senior career*
Years	Team	Apps	(Gls)
1964	Trud		
1969	Kalitva		
1970	Orbita		
1971–1972	FC SKA Rostov-on-Don		
1972–1979	Neftchi Baku PFC		
1979	Araz-Naxçıvan PFK		
1980	Daugava Riga		
- * Club domestic league appearances and goals

Füzuli Javad ogly Javadov (Azerbaijani: Füzuli Cavad oğlu Cavadov; 20 December 1950 – 11 April 2021) was an Azerbaijani professional footballer who played as a defender.

== Club career ==
He made his professional debut in the Soviet Top League in 1971 for FC SKA Rostov-on-Don.

== Personal life ==
Javadov was the father of Azerbaijani international football player Vagif Javadov, whilst his brother Isgandar Javadov was also a football player.

== Death ==
On 11 April 2021, Javadov died from complications related to COVID-19 during the COVID-19 pandemic in Azerbaijan.
