= Taufik Soleh =

Indonesian footballer

Personal information
- Full name: Taufik Soleh
- Date of birth: 25 November 1985 (age 40)
- Place of birth: Indonesia
- Height: 1.69 m (5 ft 6 1/2 in)
- Position: Midfielder

Senior career*
Years	Team	Apps	(Gls)
2007–2010	Mojokerto Putra	2	(0)
2010–2011	Bhayangkara Presisi Lampung F.C.	5	(0)
2011–2015	Persiwa Wamena	29	(0)
- * Club domestic league appearances and goals as of 11 July 2012

Taufik Soleh (born November 25, 1985) is an Indonesian former footballer.

== Club career statistics ==
As of 11 July 2012.

Club performance			League		Cup		League Cup		Total	
Season	Club	League	Apps	Goals	Apps	Goals	Apps	Goals	Apps	Goals
Indonesia			League		Piala Indonesia		League Cup		Total	
2007	Mojokerto Putra	1st Division	?	?	?	?	-		?	?
2008–09	Mojokerto Putra	1st Division	?	?	0	0	-		?	?
2009–10	Mojokerto Putra	Premier Division	2	0	2	0	-		4	0
2010–11	Bhayangkara F.C.	Premier Division	5	0	-		-		5	0
2011–12	Persiwa Wamena	Super League	6	0	-		-		6	0
Total	Indonesia		13	0	2	0	-		15	0
Career total			13	0	2	0	-		15	0

== Honours ==
=== Club honors ===
Mojokerto Putra

- First Division (1): 2008–09
