= Bank of Jordan =

Financial institution in Jordan

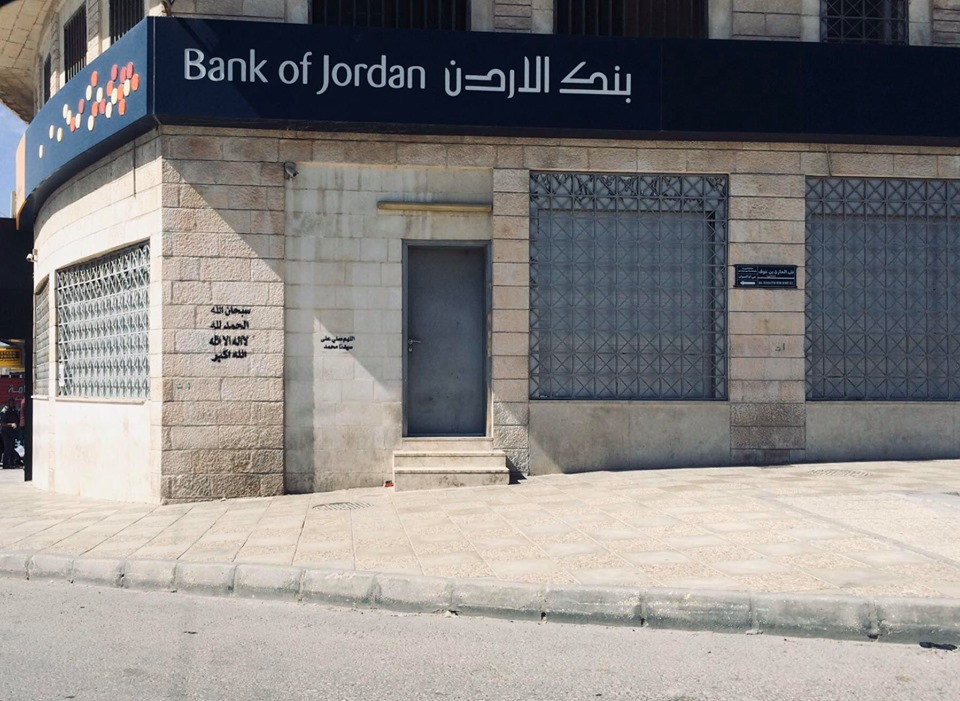
- Type: Public
- Traded as: ASE
- Industry: Banking, Financial services
- Predecessor: Public shareholding
- Founded: 1960
- Headquarters: Amman, Jordan
- Area served: Worldwide
- Key people: Shaker Fakhouri (chairman)
- Products: consumer banking, corporate banking, SME banking, investment banking, Leasing
- Website: bankofjordan.com

The Bank of Jordan (Arabic: بنك الأردن) is a bank in Jordan, where it is the second largest financial institution. It was founded in 1960 and is based in Amman. The Bank of Jordan offers credit cards and Internet banking. It operates over 100 bank branches in Jordan and 12 branches in Palestine, as well as over 150 automated teller machines.
