= Joe Paterson (cricketer) =

Scottish cricketer

Personal information
- Full name: Joseph Paterson
- Born: 27 December 1923; Coatbridge, Lanarkshire, Scotland
- Died: 10 January 1992 (aged 68); Coatbridge, Lanarkshire, Scotland
- Batting: Right-handed
- Bowling: Right-arm medium

Domestic team information
- Years: Team
- 1956: Scotland

Career statistics
Competition	First-class
Matches	1
Runs scored	1
Batting average	0.50
100s/50s	–/–
Top score	1
Catches/stumpings	–/–
- Source: Cricinfo, 14 July 2022

Joseph Paterson (27 December 1923 — 10 January 1992) was a Scottish first-class cricketer and administrator.

Paterson was born in December 1923 at Coatbridge and was educated in the town at Coatbridge High School. A club cricketer for Drumpellier Cricket Club, Paterson made a single appearance in first-class cricket for Scotland against Yorkshire at Hull on Scotland's 1956 tour of England. Batting twice in the match as a middle order batsman, he was dismissed in the Scottish first innings without scoring by Johnny Wardle, while in their second innings he was dismissed for a single run by the same bowler. Paterson later served as the president of the Scottish Cricket Union in 1980. Outside of cricket, Paterson was a work study superintendent by profession. He died at Coatbridge in January 1992.
