= Stu MacMillan =

American football player (1908–1992)

No. 12
- Position: Offensive lineman

Personal information
- Born: February 13, 1908; McVille, North Dakota, U.S.
- Died: January 13, 1992 (aged 83); Seattle, Washington, U.S.
- Listed height: 5 ft 9 in (1.75 m)
- Listed weight: 180 lb (82 kg)

Career information
- High school: University (Grand Forks, North Dakota)
- College: North Dakota

Career history
- Cleveland Indians (1931)

Career statistics
- Games played: 2
- Stats at Pro Football Reference

Charles Stuart MacMillan (February 13, 1908 – January 13, 1992) was an American football offensive lineman who played one season for the Cleveland Indians of the National Football League (NFL). He played just two games in his career, both in 1931. At the time of his death he was one of the last living Indians players, with only Merle Hutson (died 1999), Howie Kriss (died 1992), Jim Tarr (died 1995), and Dale Waters (died 2001) living longer.

== Biography ==
MacMillan was born on February 13, 1908, in McVille, North Dakota, and attended high school in Grand Forks, North Dakota. He then went to college at University of North Dakota from 1926 to 1929. He lettered there from '27 to '29 and played for their football team, the Flickertails (now Fighting Hawks). He did not play in 1930 but was chosen to play for the new Cleveland Indians NFL franchise in 1931. With them, he wore number 12 and was the third-youngest player on the team. However, MacMillan made just two appearances in the season, at the guard and center positions. He would not return for a second season as the Indians (the third team by that name) folded from the league. After his professional career he served in World War II in the U.S. Army. He died on January 13, 1992, in Seattle, Washington, at the age of 83. At the time of his death he was one of only five living former Indians players. The last would be Dale Waters, who died in 2001.
