= Arastun Javadov =

Azerbaijani politician (1948–2023)

Member of the National Assembly of Azerbaijan
- In office 2 December 2005 – 24 November 2015
- Constituency: Agsu-Ismayilli constituency No. 87

Personal details
- Born: Arastun Nureddin oglu Javadov; 20 October 1948 Ərəbmehdibəy, Azerbaijan SSR, USSR
- Died: 29 March 2023 (aged 74)
- Party: YAP
- Education: Russian University of Cooperation

Arastun Nureddin oglu Javadov (Azerbaijani: Ərəstun Nurəddin oğlu Cavadov; 20 October 1948 – 29 March 2023) was an Azerbaijani politician. A member of the New Azerbaijan Party, he served in the National Assembly from 2005 to 2015.

Javadov died on 29 March 2023, at the age of 74.
