= Arastun Mahmudov =

National Hero of Azerbaijan

- Ərəstun İspəndi oğlu Mahmudov
- Born: 23 February 1957; Ismailly, Azerbaijan SSR
- Died: 28 January 1992 (aged 34); Shusha, Azerbaijan
- Military career
- Allegiance: Republic of Azerbaijan
- Branch: Azerbaijani Air and Air Defence Force
- Service years: 1991–1992
- Conflicts: First Nagorno-Karabakh War
- Awards: National Hero of Azerbaijan; 1992

Arastun Ispandi oghlu Mahmudov (Azerbaijani: Ərəstun İspəndi oğlu Mahmudov) (23 February 1957, Ismailly, Azerbaijan SSR – 28 January 1992, Shusha, Azerbaijan) was the National Hero of Azerbaijan and warrior during the First Nagorno-Karabakh War.

== Early life and education ==
Mahmudov was born on 23 February 1957 in Pirabilqasim village of İsmailly raion of Azerbaijan SSR. He moved to Baku with his family. In 1970, he completed his secondary education at the Secondary School No. 220 in Baku. In 1975 he entered the Civil Aviation School in Leningrad Oblast.

== First Nagorno-Karabakh War ==
On 28 January 1992, the Azerbaijani transport helicopter Mil Mi-8 operated by Mahmudov was reportedly shot down by Armenians near the town of Shusha. As a result of shot down, Mahmudov was tragically killed together with the whole crew.

== Honors ==
Mahmudov was awarded the title of the "National Hero of Azerbaijan" by Presidential Decree No. 337 dated 25 November 1992.

He was buried at a Martyrs' Lane cemetery in Baku. The secondary school No. 220 where he studied was named after him. In 2018, a documentary titled Battles in heaven was released. The documentary looks into memorials surrounding the lives and battlefields of Arastun Mahmudov.

== Personal life ==
Mahmudov was married and had three children.

== See also ==
- First Nagorno-Karabakh War
- List of National Heroes of Azerbaijan
- Azerbaijani Air and Air Defence Force
- 1992 Azerbaijani Mil Mi-8 shootdown

== Sources ==
- Vüqar Əsgərov. "Azərbaycanın Milli Qəhrəmanları" (Yenidən işlənmiş II nəşr). Bakı: "Dərələyəz-M", 2010, səh. 179.
