= India at the 1994 Commonwealth Games =

- CG code: IND
- CGA: Indian Olympic Association
- Website: olympic.ind.in

in Victoria, British Columbia, Canada
- Competitors: 39 in 4 sports
- Medals Ranked 6th: Gold 6 Silver 11 Bronze 7 Total 24

Commonwealth Games appearances (overview)
- 1934; 1938; 1950; 1954; 1958; 1962; 1966; 1970; 1974; 1978; 1982; 1986; 1990; 1994; 1998; 2002; 2006; 2010; 2014; 2018; 2022; 2026; 2030

India competed at the 1994 Commonwealth Games held in Victoria, British Columbia, Canada, from 18 to 28 August 1994. It was the country's eleventh appearance at the Commonwealth Games since making its debut at the 1934 British Empire Games.

The Indian contingent consisted of 39 athletes competing across four sports. India won a total of 24 medals, comprising six gold, eleven silver, and seven bronze medals, to finish sixth in the overall medal table.

== Medalists ==
India won 24 medals, including six gold, eleven silver and seven bronze medals, to finish sixth in the overall medal table.

Medal	Name	Sport	Event
(gold) Gold	Jaspal Rana	Shooting	Men's 25 m centre-fire pistol
(gold) Gold	Jaspal Rana; Ashok Pandit	Shooting	Men's 25 m centre-fire pistol – pairs
(gold) Gold	Mansher Singh	Shooting	Men's Trap
(gold) Gold	Murgesan Veerasamy	Weightlifting	Flyweight 54 kg – snatch
(gold) Gold	Badathala Adisekhar	Weightlifting	Flyweight 54 kg – clean and jerk
(gold) Gold	Badathala Adisekhar	Weightlifting	Flyweight 54 kg – overall
(silver) Silver	Jaspal Rana	Shooting	Men's 10 m air pistol
(silver) Silver	Roopa Unnikrishnan	Shooting	Women's 50 m small bore rifle three positions
(silver) Silver	Badathala Adisekhar	Weightlifting	Flyweight 54 kg – snatch
(silver) Silver	Murgesan Veerasamy	Weightlifting	Flyweight 54 kg – overall
(silver) Silver	Chandersekaran Raghavan	Weightlifting	Bantamweight 59 kg – snatch
(silver) Silver	Chandersekaran Raghavan	Weightlifting	Bantamweight 59 kg – clean and jerk
(silver) Silver	Chandersekaran Raghavan	Weightlifting	Bantamweight 59 kg – overall
(silver) Silver	Satheesha Rai	Weightlifting	Lightweight 70 kg – clean and jerk
(silver) Silver	Satheesha Rai	Weightlifting	Lightweight 70 kg – overall
(silver) Silver	Ashok Kumar	Wrestling	Bantamweight 57 kg
(silver) Silver	Randhir Singh	Wrestling	Middleweight 82 kg
(bronze) Bronze	Sah Birju	Boxing	Light-flyweight 48 kg
(bronze) Bronze	Jaspal Rana; Vivek Singh	Shooting	Men's 10 m air pistol – pairs
(bronze) Bronze	Roopa Unnikrishnan; Kuheli Gangulee	Shooting	Women's 50 m small bore rifle three positions – pairs
(bronze) Bronze	Murgesan Veerasamy	Weightlifting	Flyweight 54 kg – clean and jerk
(bronze) Bronze	Ramesh Kumar	Wrestling	Light flyweight 48 kg
(bronze) Bronze	Kirpa Shankar	Wrestling	Flyweight 51 kg
(bronze) Bronze	Subhash Verma	Wrestling	Heavyweight 100 kg

== Competitors ==
The Indian contingent included 39 athletes competing across four sports.

Sport	Men	Women	Total
Boxing	3	—N/a	3
Shooting	10	6	16
Weightlifting	10	—N/a	10
Wrestling	10	—N/a	10
Total	33	6	39

== Boxing ==
India competed in three boxing events at the 1994 Commonwealth Games. Birju Shah won the bronze medal in the light-flyweight division.

Athlete	Event	Preliminary	Quarterfinal	Semifinal	Final	Rank
Athlete	Event	Opposition Result	Opposition Result	Opposition Result	Opposition Result	Rank
Birju Shah	Light-flyweight 48 kg	Moffett (NIR); W 14:5	Makepula (RSA); W +13:13	Ramadhani (KEN); L 8:24	Did not advance	3rd place, bronze medalist(s)
Gurmeet Singh	Bantamweight 54 kg	St. Clair (GUY); L 7:9	Did not advance			
Venkatesan Devarajan	Featherweight 57 kg	Swan (AUS); L 5:7	Did not advance			

Legend

- W – Win; L – Loss;

== Shooting ==
India competed in 25 shooting events at the 1994 Commonwealth Games. Indian shooters won three gold medals, two silver medals and two bronze medals.

Athlete	Event	Preliminary		Final	
Athlete	Event	Points	Rank	Points	Rank
Jaspal Rana	Men's 50 m free pistol		Q	633.4	8
Ashok Pandit	Men's 50 m free pistol	535	13	Did not advance	
Jaspal Rana; Ashok Pandit	Men's 50 m free pistol – pairs	—N/a		1071	7
Jaspal Rana	Men's 25 m centre-fire pistol	—N/a		581	1st place, gold medalist(s)
Ashok Pandit	Men's 25 m centre-fire pistol	—N/a		575	4
Jaspal Rana; Ashok Pandit	Men's 25 m centre-fire pistol – pairs	—N/a		1168 GR	1st place, gold medalist(s)
Dhyan Singh	Men's 25 m rapid-fire pistol	567	11	Did not advance	
Ved Pilaniya	Men's 25 m rapid-fire pistol	564	13	Did not advance	
Dhyan Singh; Ved Pilaniya	Men's 25 m rapid-fire pistol – pairs	—N/a		1110	7
Abha Dhillan	Women's 25 m sport pistol		Q	658.5	8
Abha Dhillan; Sonika Manon	Women's 25 m sport pistol – pairs	—N/a		1099	5
Jaspal Rana	Men's 10 m air pistol		Q	670.7	2nd place, silver medalist(s)
Vivek Singh	Men's 10 m air pistol	561	15	Did not advance	
Jaspal Rana; Vivek Singh	Men's 10 m air pistol – pairs	—N/a		1133	3rd place, bronze medalist(s)
Abha Dhillan	Women's 10 m air pistol	361	15	Did not advance	
Sonika Manon	Women's 10 m air pistol	358	16	Did not advance	
Abha Dhillan; Sonika Manon	Women's 10 m air pistol – pairs	—N/a		721	6
T. C. Palangappa	Men's 10 m air rifle		Q	676.5	5
Roopa Unnikrishnan	Women's 10 m air rifle	377	11	Did not advance	
Deepali Sirsat	Women's 10 m air rifle	375	12	Did not advance	
Roopa Unnikrishnan; Deepali Sirsat	Women's 10 m air rifle – pairs	—N/a		756	4
T. C. Palangappa	Men's 50 m rifle prone	574	31	Did not advance	
M. T. Sutar	Men's 50 m rifle prone	575	29	Did not advance	
T. C. Palangappa; M. T. Sutar	Men's 50 m rifle prone – pairs	—N/a		1161	9
Kuheli Gangulee	Women's 50 m small-bore rifle prone	569	17	Did not advance	
Roopa Unnikrishnan	Women's 50 m small-bore rifle prone		Q	579	7
Kuheli Gangulee; Roopa Unnikrishnan	Women's 50 m small-bore rifle prone – pairs	—N/a		1142	8
Kuheli Gangulee	Women's 50 m small-bore rifle three positions	548	10	Did not advance	
Roopa Unnikrishnan	Women's 50 m small-bore rifle three positions		Q	662.5	2nd place, silver medalist(s)
Kuheli Gangulee; Roopa Unnikrishnan	Women's 50 m small-bore rifle three positions – pairs	—N/a		1110	3rd place, bronze medalist(s)
Mansher Singh	Men's trap		Q	141	1st place, gold medalist(s)
Moraad Ali Khan	Men's trap	108	19	Did not advance	
Mansher Singh; Moraad Ali Khan	Trap – pairs	—N/a		167	14
Harinder Bedi	Skeet	114	16	Did not qualify	
Rao Inderjit Singh	Skeet		Q	137	6
Harinder Bedi; Rao Inderjit Singh	Skeet – pairs	—N/a		172	10

Legend

- Q – Qualified for the next round

== Weightlifting ==
India competed in six weightlifting events at the 1994 Commonwealth Games. Indian weightlifters won eleven medals, including three golds, seven silvers, and a bronze medal.

Athlete	Event	Snatch		Clean & jerk		Overall	
Athlete	Event	Result	Rank	Result	Rank	Result	Rank
Badathala Adisekhar	Flyweight 54 kg	105.0 kg	2nd place, silver medalist(s)	132.5 kg	1st place, gold medalist(s)	237.5 kg	1st place, gold medalist(s)
Murgesan Veerasamy	Flyweight 54 kg	105.0 kg	1st place, gold medalist(s)	127.5 kg	3rd place, bronze medalist(s)	232.5 kg	2nd place, silver medalist(s)
Chandersekaran Raghavan	Bantamweight 59 kg	110.0 kg	2nd place, silver medalist(s)	145.0 kg	2nd place, silver medalist(s)	255.0 kg	2nd place, silver medalist(s)
Sandeep Kumar	Bantamweight 59 kg	97.5 kg	6	120.0 kg	6	217.5 kg	6
Onkar Singh	Featherweight 64 kg	NM		127.5 kg	7	127.5 kg	11
Satheesha Rai	Lightweight 70 kg	127.5 kg	5	165.0 kg	2nd place, silver medalist(s)	292.5 kg	2nd place, silver medalist(s)
Natarajan Sampath	Lightweight 70 kg	122.5 kg	7	155.0 kg	5	277.5 kg	7
Paramjit Sharma	Middleweight 76 kg	115.0 kg	9	155.0 kg	6	270.0 kg	6
Harnam Singh	Sub-heavyweight 99 kg	140.0 kg	4	172.5 kg	5	312.5 kg	5
Perumalsamy Karasu	Sub-heavyweight 99 kg	130.0 kg	6	165.0 kg	7	295.0 kg	7

== Wrestling ==
India competed in ten events and won two silver medals and three bronze medals in wrestling at the 1994 Commonwealth Games.

Freestyle men

Athlete	Event	Final / BM	Rank
Athlete	Event	Opposition Result	Rank
Ramesh Kumar	Light flyweight 48 kg	Louw (NAM); W 10–0	3rd place, bronze medalist(s)
Kripa Shankar Patel	Flyweight 52 kg	Connelly (SCO); W 3–0	3rd place, bronze medalist(s)
Ashok Kumar Garg	Bantamweight 57 kg	Dawson (CAN); L 1–7	2nd place, silver medalist(s)
Dharambir Singh	Featherweight 62 kg	Did not advance	5
Sucha Singh	Lightweight 68 kg	Umar (PAK); L 1–3	4
Tejbir Singh	Welterweight 74 kg	Did not advance	5
Randhir Singh	Middleweight 82 kg	Abdou (CAN); L 3–15	2nd place, silver medalist(s)
Sanjay Kumar	Light heavyweight 90 kg	Did not advance	6
Subhash Verma	Heavyweight 100 kg	Iloanusi (NGR); W 3–0	3rd place, bronze medalist(s)
Jagdish Singh	Super heavyweight +100 kg	Singh (ENG); L 0–5	4

Legend

- W – Win; L – Loss;
