= Weightlifting at the 1994 Commonwealth Games =

- Venue: Royal Theatre
- Location: Victoria, Canada
- Dates: 18 to 28 August 1994

Weightlifting at the 1994 Commonwealth Games was the 12th appearance of Weightlifting at the Commonwealth Games. The events were held in Victoria, Canada, from 18 to 28 August 1994 and featured contests in ten weight classes.

The weightlifting events were held at the Royal Theatre. The format retained the three gold medals per weight category (snatch, clean and jerk and overall) which had been introduced in 1990. Thirty gold medals were therefore available again in just ten weight categories and resulted in the odd scenario whereby one athlete could win three gold medals in the same event.

Australia topped the weightlifting medal table by virtue of winning 14 gold medals.

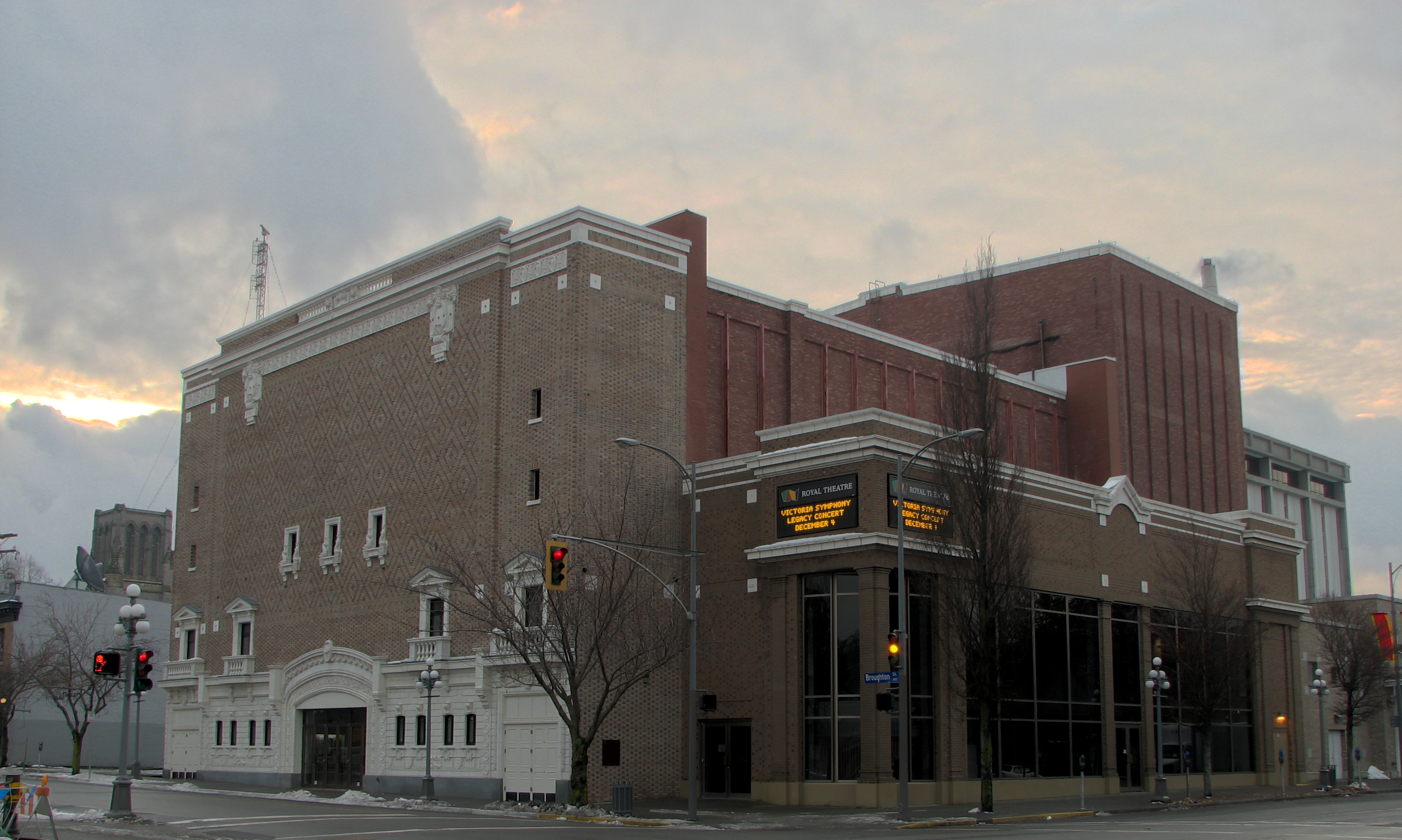
The Royal Theatre in 2012

== Medal table ==
* Host nation (Canada)

Rank	Nation	Gold	Silver	Bronze	Total
1	Australia	14	9	2	25
2	Nigeria	6	4	9	19
3	India	3	7	1	11
4	Nauru	3	0	0	3
5	England	2	7	3	12
6	Wales	2	1	3	6
7	Canada*	0	1	9	10
8	Malaysia	0	1	0	1
Totals (8 entries)		30	30	27	87

== Medallists ==
Event	Gold	Silver	Bronze
Flyweight 54kg
Snatch	Murgesan Veerasamy; India	Badathala Adisekhar; India	François Lagacé; Canada
Clean and Jerk	Badathala Adisekhar; India	Matin Guntali; Malaysia	Murgesan Veerasamy; India
Overall	Badathala Adisekhar; India	Murgesan Veerasamy; India	François Lagacé; Canada
Bantamweight 59kg
Snatch	Marcus Stephen; Nauru	Chandersekaran Raghavan; India	Denis Aumais; Canada
Clean and Jerk	Marcus Stephen; Nauru	Chandersekaran Raghavan; India	Ben Devonshire; England
Overall	Marcus Stephen; Nauru	Chandersekaran Raghavan; India	Denis Aumais; Canada
Featherweight 64kg
Snatch	Najite Ogbogu; Nigeria	Sevdalin Marinov; Australia	Oliver Toby; Nigeria
Clean and Jerk	Oliver Toby; Nigeria	Sevdalin Marinov; Australia	Najite Ogbogu; Nigeria
Overall	Sevdalin Marinov; Australia	Najite Ogbogu; Nigeria	Oliver Toby; Nigeria
Lightweight 70kg
Snatch	Lawal Riliwan; Nigeria	Stewart Cruickshank; England	Moji Oluwa; Nigeria
Clean and Jerk	Moji Oluwa; Nigeria	Satish Rai; India	Stewart Cruickshank; England
Overall	Moji Oluwa; Nigeria	Satish Rai; India	Stewart Cruickshank; England
Middleweight 76kg
Snatch	David Morgan; Wales	Serge Trembley; Canada	Damian Brown; Australia
Clean and Jerk	Damian Brown; Australia	David Morgan; Wales	Serge Trembley; Canada
Overall	David Morgan; Wales5	Damian Brown; Australia	Serge Trembley; Canada
Light Heavyweight 83kg
Snatch	Kiril Kounev; Australia	Stephen Ward; England	Jim Dan Corbett; Canada
Clean and Jerk	Kiril Kounev; Australia	Stephen Ward; England	Jim Dan Corbett; Canada
Overall	Kiril Kounev; Australia	Stephen Ward; England	Jim Dan Corbett; Canada
Middle Heavyweight 91kg
Snatch	Harvey Goodman; Australia	Peter May; England	Not awarded (only 3 entries)
Clean and Jerk	Harvey Goodman; Australia	Peter May; England	Not awarded (only 3 entries)
Overall	Harvey Goodman; Australia	Peter May; England	Not awarded (only 3 entries)
Sub Heavyweight 99kg
Snatch	Christopher Onyezie; Nigeria	Andrew Saxton; Australia	Phillip Christou; Australia
Clean and Jerk	Andy Callard; England	Andrew Saxton; Australia	Christopher Onyezie; Nigeria
Overall	Andy Callard; England	Andrew Saxton; Australia	Christopher Onyezie; Nigeria
Heavyweight 108kg
Snatch	Nicu Vlad; Australia	Innocent Chika; Nigeria	Gareth Hives; Wales
Clean and Jerk	Nicu Vlad; Australia	Innocent Chika; Nigeria	Gareth Hives; Wales
Overall	Nicu Vlad; Australia	Innocent Chika; Nigeria	Gareth Hives; Wales
Super Heavyweight +108kg
Snatch	Steven Kettner; Australia	Stefan Botev; Australia	Victor Edem; Nigeria
Clean and Jerk	Stefan Botev; Australia	Steven Kettner; Australia	Victor Edem; Nigeria
Overall	Stefan Botev; Australia	Steven Kettner; Australia	Victor Edem; Nigeria

== Results ==
- Athletes listed in overall position

=== Flyweight 54kg ===
Pos	Athlete	Clean & jerk	Snatch	Overall kg
1	Badathala Adisekhar (IND)	132.5	105.0	237.5
2	Murgesan Veerasamy (IND)	127.5	105.0	232.5
3	Francois Lagace (CAN)	122.5	105.0	227.5
4	Johnny Nguyen (AUS)	125.0	100.0	225.0
5	Martin Guntali (MAS)	130.0	90.0	220.0
6	Rajunit Pangkat (MAS)	115.0	85.0	200.0
7	Aveenash Pandoo (MRI)	115.0	85.0	200.0
8	Gino Souprayen (MRI)	110.0	90.0	200.0

=== Bantamweight 59kg ===
Pos	Athlete	Clean & jerk	Snatch	Overall kg
1	Marcus Stephen (NRU)	147.5	115.0	262.5
2	Chandersekaran Raghavan (IND)	145.0	110.0	255.0
3	Denis Aumais (CAN)	130.0	107.5	237.5
4	Ben Devonshire (ENG)	132.5	105.0	237.5
5	Abdul Rahman (MAS)	120.0	97.5	217.5
6	Sandeep Kumar (IND)	120.0	97.5	217.5
7	Ari Danny (PNG)	117.5	90.0	207.5

=== Featherweight 64kg ===
Pos	Athlete	Clean & jerk	Snatch	Overall kg
1	Sevdalin Marinov (AUS)	152.5	125.0	277.5
2	Najite Ogbodu (NGR)	150.0	125.0	275.0
3	Oliver Toby (NGR)	152.5	120.0	272.5
4	Sébastien Groulx (CAN)	145.0	115.0	260.0
5	Jean Lavertue (CAN)	140.0	115.0	255.0
6	Eamon Byrne (NIR)	135.0	105.0	240.0
7	Peter Ndungu (KEN)	125.0	100.0	225.0
8	Paul Richard (WAL)	122.5	97.5	220.0
9	David Leverage (SCO)	120.0	95.0	220.0
11	Onkar Singh (IND)	127.5	X	127.5
12	Jonathan Lubin (ENG)	X	110.0	110.0

=== Lightweight 70kg ===
Pos	Athlete	Clean & jerk	Snatch	Overall kg
1	Moji Oluwa (NGR)	165.0	130.0	295.0
2	Satheesha Rai (IND)	165.0	127.5	292.5
3	Stewart Cruickshank (ENG)	160.0	132.5	292.5
4	Patrick Arnau (CAN)	157.5	130.0	287.5
5	Lawal Riliwan (NGR)	150.0	132.5	282.5
6	Tony Morgan (WAL)	155.0	127.5	282.5
7	Natarajan Sampath (IND)	155.0	122.5	277.5
8	Leon Griffin (ENG)	150.0	120.0	270.0
9	Mark Roach (WAL)	147.5	120.0	267.5
10	Ofisa Ofisa (SAM)	150.0	115.0	265.0
12	Peter Kilapa (PNG)	140.0	110.0	250.0
13	Jean-Claude Etheve (SEY)	130.0	100.0	230.0
14	Phillip Jikoutai (PNG)	120.0	105.0	225.0
15	Mbuso Magongo (SWZ)	110.0	87.5	197.5
16	Rob Lockwood (CAN)	X	120.0	120.0
17	Brendan Cooke (NIR)	X	100.0	100.0

=== Middleweight 76kg ===
Pos	Athlete	Clean & jerk	Snatch	Overall kg
1	Dave Morgan (WAL)	180.0	147.5	327.5
2	Damian Brown (AUS)	182.5	142.5	325.0
3	Serge Tremblay (CAN)	172.5	145.0	317.5
4	Alain Bilodeau (CAN)	160.0	132.5	292.5
5	Andrew Littler (ENG)	165.0	125.0	290.0
6	Paramjit Sharma (IND)	155.0	115.0	270.0
7	Andy Goswell (WAL)	150.0	120.0	270.0
8	Raymond Cavanagh (SCO)	135.0	110.0	245.0
9	James Owens (SCO)	132.5	110.0	242.5
10	David Obiero (KEN)	120.0	100.0	220.0
11	Anthony Arthur (ENG)	X	130.0	130.0

=== Light-heavyweight 83kg ===
Pos	Athlete	Clean & jerk	Snatch	Overall kg
1	Kiril Kounev (AUS)	200.0	152.5	352.5
2	Stephen Ward (ENG)	187.5	147.5	335.0
3	Yvan Darsigny (CAN)	175.0	142.5	317.5
4	Neil Taylor (WAL)	160.0	125.0	285.0
5	Rhodri Thomas (WAL)	150.0	120.0	270.0
6	Jacques Groenewald (RSA)	145.0	120.0	265.0
7	Charles Hamilton (SCO)	140.0	115.0	255.0
8	Jim Dan Corbett (CAN)	X	147.5	147.5
9	John McEwan (SCO)	X	130.0	130.0

=== Middle-heavyweight 91kg ===
Pos	Athlete	Clean & jerk	Snatch	Overall kg
1	Harvey Goodman (AUS)	200.0	162.5	362.5
2	Peter May (ENG)	190.0	155.0	345.0
3	Collins Okoth (KEN)	120.0	120.0	240.0

=== Sub-heavyweight 99kg ===
Pos	Athlete	Clean & jerk	Snatch	Overall kg
1	Andy Callard (ENG)	197.5	150.0	347.5
2	Andrew Saxton (AUS)	192.5	155.0	347.5
3	Christopher Onyezie (NGR)	190.0	155.0	345.0
4	Phillip Christou (AUS)	180.0	152.5	332.5
5	Harnam Singh (IND)	172.5	140.0	312.5
6	Lee Attrill (NZL)	170.0	130.0	300.0
7	Perumalsamy Karasu (IND)	165.0	130.0	295.0
8	Thomas Neil (SCO)	155.0	130.0	285.0
9	Gary Williams (WAL)	155.0	127.5	282.5
10	Charles Murray (SCO)	160.0	117.5	277.5
11	Emil Huch (SAM)	142.5	110.0	252.5
12	Kolinau Makahili (TON)	160.0	X	160.0

=== Heavyweight 108kg ===
Pos	Athlete	Clean & jerk	Snatch	Overall kg
1	Nicu Vlad (AUS)	220.0	185.0	405.0
2	Innocent Chika (NGR)	200.0	160.0	360.0
3	Gareth Hives (WAL)	160.0	130.0	290.0
4	Marc Marais (RSA)	160.0	125.0	285.0

=== Super-heavyweight +108kg ===
Pos	Athlete	Clean & jerk	Snatch	Overall kg
1	Stefan Botev (AUS)	200.0	160.0	360.0
2	Steve Kettner (AUS)	195.0	165.0	360.0
3	Victor Edem (NGR)	190.0	155.0	345.0
4	Talona Taua (SAM)	185.0	137.5	322.5
5	Darren Liddel (NZL)	175.0	142.5	317.5
6	Terry Perdue (WAL)	165.0	125.0	290.0
7	Frank Accouche (SEY)	140.0	105.0	245.0
8	Gerard Jones (NRU)	137.5	100.0	237.5
9	Giles Greenwood (ENG)	X	X	0

== See also ==
- List of Commonwealth Games medallists in weightlifting
