= 1999 World Weightlifting Championships – Men's 77 kg =

The Men's Middleweight Weightlifting Event (77 kg) is the fourth men's weight class event at the weightlifting competition, limited to competitors with a maximum of 77 kilograms of body mass. The competition at the 1999 World Weightlifting Championships took place in Athens, Greece on 25 November 1999.

Each lifter performed in both the snatch and clean and jerk lifts, with the final score being the sum of the lifter's best result in each. The athlete received three attempts in each of the two lifts; the score for the lift was the heaviest weight successfully lifted.

== Medalists ==
Event	Gold		Silver		Bronze	
Snatch	Khachatur Kyapanaktsyan (ARM)	170.0 kg	Plamen Zhelyazkov (BUL)	170.0 kg	Badr Salem Nayef (QAT)	165.0 kg
Clean & Jerk	Badr Salem Nayef (QAT)	205.0 kg	Viktor Mitrou (GRE)	205.0 kg	Nader Sufyan Abbas (QAT)	202.5 kg
Total	Badr Salem Nayef (QAT)	370.0 kg	Viktor Mitrou (GRE)	370.0 kg	Plamen Zhelyazkov (BUL)	370.0 kg

== Records ==
Prior to this competition, the existing world records were as follows.

World Record	Snatch	Khachatur Kyapanaktsyan (ARM)	168.5 kg	A Coruña, Spain	16 April 1999
World Record	Clean & Jerk	Zhan Xugang (CHN)	206.0 kg	Wuhan, China	2 September 1999
World Record	Total	World Standard	372.5 kg	—	1 January 1998

== Results ==
Rank	Athlete	Body weight	Snatch (kg)				Clean & Jerk (kg)				Total
Rank	Athlete	Body weight	1	2	3	Rank	1	2	3	Rank	Total
1st place, gold medalist(s)	Badr Salem Nayef (QAT)	76.26	155.0	160.0	165.0	3rd place, bronze medalist(s)	195.0	200.0	205.0	1st place, gold medalist(s)	370.0
2nd place, silver medalist(s)	Viktor Mitrou (GRE)	76.67	160.0	165.0	~~167.5~~	5	197.5	202.5	205.0	2nd place, silver medalist(s)	370.0
3rd place, bronze medalist(s)	Plamen Zhelyazkov (BUL)	76.85	160.0	165.0	170.0	2nd place, silver medalist(s)	~~197.5~~	197.5	200.0	7	370.0
4	Zhan Xugang (CHN)	76.26	157.5	162.5	~~165.0~~	7	195.0	202.5	~~207.5~~	4	365.0
5	Nader Sufyan Abbas (QAT)	76.24	~~157.5~~	157.5	~~162.5~~	13	190.0	200.0	202.5	3rd place, bronze medalist(s)	360.0
6	Arsen Melikyan (ARM)	76.72	~~155.0~~	155.0	160.0	12	190.0	195.0	200.0	6	360.0
7	Khachatur Kyapanaktsyan (ARM)	76.77	162.5	167.5	170.5	1st place, gold medalist(s)	~~190.0~~	190.0	~~200.0~~	17	360.0
8	Dmytro Hnidenko (UKR)	75.90	152.5	157.5	162.5	6	182.5	187.5	192.5	11	355.0
9	Zlatan Vanev (BUL)	76.47	157.5	~~162.5~~	~~162.5~~	14	197.5	~~212.5~~	~~212.5~~	8	355.0
10	Sergey Filimonov (KAZ)	76.50	155.0	160.0	165.0	4	~~185.0~~	185.0	190.0	14	355.0
11	Mehmet Yılmaz (TUR)	76.50	160.0	~~165.0~~	~~165.0~~	10	190.0	~~195.0~~	~~195.0~~	15	350.0
12	Adrián Popa (HUN)	76.57	140.0	145.0	150.0	22	187.5	195.0	200.0	5	350.0
13	Ayhan Çiçek (TUR)	76.54	152.5	157.5	~~160.0~~	15	185.0	190.0	~~195.0~~	16	347.5
14	Lee Kang-suk (KOR)	76.73	150.0	~~155.0~~	~~155.0~~	23	185.0	190.0	197.5	9	347.5
15	Li Hongli (CHN)	76.11	160.0	~~165.0~~	~~165.0~~	8	185.0	~~192.5~~	~~192.5~~	20	345.0
16	Kim Jong-shik (KOR)	76.39	150.0	155.0	~~160.0~~	16	185.0	190.0	~~197.5~~	13	345.0
17	Oleg Perepetchenov (RUS)	76.90	152.5	~~157.5~~	~~157.5~~	19	182.5	187.5	192.5	12	345.0
18	Ingo Steinhöfel (GER)	76.46	155.0	160.0	~~162.5~~	9	182.5	~~187.5~~	—	22	342.5
19	Idalberto Aranda (CUB)	76.63	145.0	~~150.0~~	~~150.0~~	29	195.0	~~202.5~~	~~202.5~~	10	340.0
20	Vasile Hegheduș (ROM)	75.82	150.0	~~155.0~~	~~155.0~~	21	185.0	~~190.0~~	~~190.0~~	19	335.0
21	Oscar Chaplin (USA)	76.73	145.0	150.0	152.5	18	177.5	182.5	~~185.0~~	23	335.0
22	Walter Llerena (ECU)	76.75	142.5	147.5	~~152.5~~	24	175.0	~~185.0~~	185.0	21	332.5
23	Shuhrat Kochkorov (KGZ)	76.45	135.0	142.5	~~145.0~~	32	175.0	182.5	187.5	18	330.0
24	Viktor Gumán (SVK)	76.89	~~155.0~~	155.0	~~160.0~~	17	160.0	170.0	175.0	30	330.0
25	Ilirjan Suli (ALB)	76.96	142.5	147.5	152.5	20	172.5	~~177.5~~	177.5	27	330.0
26	Zoltán Kecskés (HUN)	75.75	145.0	~~150.0~~	~~150.0~~	25	175.0	180.0	~~185.0~~	25	325.0
27	Rafat Galal (EGY)	76.82	142.5	~~147.5~~	~~147.5~~	33	~~175.0~~	175.0	182.5	24	325.0
28	Vladimir Bîrsa (MDA)	76.60	145.0	~~150.0~~	~~150.0~~	28	175.0	177.5	~~180.0~~	26	322.5
29	Rilwan Lawal (NGR)	76.27	140.0	145.0	—	26	170.0	175.0	~~177.5~~	28	320.0
30	Abdullah Iskandarani (SYR)	76.96	145.0	~~150.0~~	~~152.5~~	31	~~172.5~~	172.5	~~177.5~~	32	317.5
31	Anatolijs Daškevičs (LAT)	76.73	135.0	140.0	~~142.5~~	35	170.0	175.0	~~177.5~~	29	315.0
32	Claude Doukam (CMR)	76.37	140.0	~~145.0~~	145.0	27	165.0	~~170.0~~	—	39	310.0
33	Kaics Ayadi (TUN)	76.64	~~140.0~~	145.0	~~150.0~~	30	~~165.0~~	165.0	~~172.5~~	41	310.0
34	Mohammed Wahab (NED)	76.13	130.0	135.0	~~140.0~~	39	165.0	172.5	~~177.5~~	31	307.5
35	Jugnevis Campos (VEN)	74.66	~~135.0~~	~~135.0~~	135.0	38	~~170.0~~	170.0	~~175.0~~	33	305.0
36	Mats Lindquist (SWE)	76.75	~~140.0~~	140.0	~~145.0~~	36	~~165.0~~	165.0	~~167.5~~	43	305.0
37	Zbyněk Vacurá (CZE)	76.70	137.5	~~142.5~~	~~142.5~~	37	165.0	~~170.0~~	~~170.0~~	42	302.5
38	Stewart Cruickshank (GBR)	75.88	132.5	~~137.5~~	~~137.5~~	42	162.5	167.5	~~172.5~~	35	300.0
39	Scott McCarthy (CAN)	76.50	130.0	~~135.0~~	135.0	40	160.0	165.0	~~167.5~~	40	300.0
40	Guy Hamilton (CAN)	76.81	130.0	~~135.0~~	~~135.0~~	47	165.0	170.0	~~175.0~~	34	300.0
41	Craig Blythman (AUS)	76.82	~~132.5~~	132.5	~~137.5~~	43	160.0	165.0	—	44	297.5
42	Luis Coronado (GUA)	76.08	125.0	130.0	~~132.5~~	45	160.0	165.0	~~170.0~~	37	295.0
43	Annaberdi Babaýew (TKM)	72.90	132.5	~~137.5~~	~~137.5~~	41	~~157.5~~	157.5	~~162.5~~	46	290.0
44	Hsu Ying-hsi (TPE)	74.56	125.0	~~130.0~~	~~130.0~~	48	160.0	165.0	~~170.0~~	36	290.0
45	Quincy Detenamo (NRU)	76.30	~~125.0~~	125.0	~~130.0~~	50	~~165.0~~	165.0	~~170.0~~	38	290.0
46	Robert Wachet (AUT)	75.23	125.0	~~130.0~~	130.0	44	155.0	~~160.0~~	~~160.0~~	49	285.0
47	Marco Messias (POR)	76.78	125.0	130.0	~~132.5~~	46	150.0	155.0	~~160.0~~	50	285.0
48	Sililo Fomai (SAM)	74.79	~~120.0~~	120.0	125.0	49	145.0	152.5	157.5	47	282.5
49	Alexander Reis (POR)	76.24	~~117.5~~	117.5	122.5	54	155.0	160.0	~~162.5~~	45	282.5
50	Redjean Clerc (SUI)	76.43	120.0	~~127.5~~	~~127.5~~	57	150.0	155.0	157.5	48	277.5
51	Khodor Alaywan (LIB)	76.44	~~125.0~~	~~125.0~~	125.0	51	150.0	~~155.0~~	~~155.0~~	51	275.0
52	Tevika Kudashevitz (ISR)	76.83	115.0	122.5	~~127.5~~	56	137.5	145.0	150.0	52	272.5
53	Vytautas Kirkliauskas (LTU)	76.45	120.0	125.0	~~127.5~~	52	137.5	142.5	145.0	53	270.0
54	Arik Sherwyn (ISR)	76.81	117.5	122.5	~~127.5~~	55	145.0	~~150.0~~	~~150.0~~	54	267.5
55	Khalid King (IRL)	76.59	120.0	125.0	~~130.0~~	53	~~130.0~~	130.0	~~137.5~~	56	255.0
56	Joseph Kerr (IRL)	74.21	105.0	~~107.5~~	~~107.5~~	58	~~135.0~~	135.0	~~140.0~~	55	240.0
—	Mohammad Hossein Barkhah (IRI)	76.62	155.0	160.0	~~162.5~~	11	~~195.0~~	~~195.0~~	~~197.5~~	—	—
—	Tudor Casapu (MDA)	76.49	140.0	~~145.0~~	~~145.0~~	34	~~185.0~~	~~185.0~~	—	—	—
DQ	Rǎzvan Ilie (ROM)	76.75	165.0	170.0	~~172.5~~	—	~~200.0~~	~~200.0~~	~~200.0~~	—	—
DQ	Dionisio Rozalina (NED)	73.01	115.0	120.0	~~125.0~~	—	150.0	155.0	—	—	—

== New records ==
Snatch	170.0 kg	Plamen Zhelyazkov (BUL)	WR
Snatch	170.5 kg	Khachatur Kyapanaktsyan (ARM)	WR
