= Weightlifting at the 2002 Commonwealth Games – Men's 77 kg =

Weightlifting – Men's 77 kg at the 2002 Commonwealth Games
- Venue: Manchester International Convention Centre
- Dates: 1 August 2002
- Competitors: 14 from 10 nations
- Winning total weight: 305

Medalists
gold medal	Dave Morgan	Wales
silver medal	Renos Doweiya	Nauru
bronze medal	Scott McCarthy	Canada

The Men's 77 kg weightlifting event at the 2002 Commonwealth Games took place at the Manchester International Convention Centre on 1 August 2002. The weightlifter from Wales won the gold, with a combined lift of 305 kg.

== Schedule ==
All times are Coordinated Universal Time (UTC)

Date	Time	Event
1 August 2002	10:00	Group A

== Records ==
Prior to this competition, the existing world, Commonwealth and Games records were as follows:

World record	Snatch	Plamen Zhelyazkov (BUL)	172.5 kg	Doha, Qatar	27 March 2002
World record	Clean & Jerk	Oleg Perepetchenov (RUS)	210.0 kg	Trenčín, Slovakia	27 April 2001
World record	Total	Plamen Zhelyazkov (BUL)	377.5 kg	Doha, Qatar	27 March 2002
Commonwealth record	Snatch				
Commonwealth record	Clean & Jerk				
Commonwealth record	Total				
Games record	Snatch	Satheesha Rai (IND)	147.5 kg	Kuala Lumpur, Malaysia	17 September 1998
Games record	Clean & Jerk	Damian Brown (AUS)	187.5 kg	Kuala Lumpur, Malaysia	17 September 1998
Games record	Total	Damian Brown (AUS)	327.5 kg	Kuala Lumpur, Malaysia	17 September 1998

== Results ==
Rank	Athlete	Nation	Group	Body weight	Snatch (kg)					Clean & Jerk (kg)					Total
Rank	Athlete	Nation	Group	Body weight	1	2	3	Result	Rank	1	2	3	Result	Rank	Total
1st place, gold medalist(s)	Dave Morgan	Wales	A	76.32	140.0	~~142.5~~	145.0	145.0	2nd place, silver medalist(s)	~~160.0~~	160.0	~~167.5~~	160.0	1st place, gold medalist(s)	305.0
2nd place, silver medalist(s)	Renos Doweiya	Nauru	A	76.40	125.0	130.0	~~135.0~~	130.0	5	152.5	160.0	~~165.0~~	160.0	2nd place, silver medalist(s)	290.0
3rd place, bronze medalist(s)	Scott McCarthy	Canada	A	76.56	125.0	132.5	~~135.0~~	132.5	4	~~157.5~~	157.5	~~162.5~~	157.5	3rd place, bronze medalist(s)	290.0
4	Claude Caouette	Canada	A	76.58	~~125.0~~	~~125.0~~	125.0	125.0	7	150.0	~~155.0~~	~~157.5~~	150.0	4	275.0
5	Tony Morgan	Wales	A	76.20	115.0	120.0	~~125.0~~	120.0	9	140.0	145.0	147.5	147.5	5	267.5
6	Uati Maposua	Samoa	A	76.06	115.0	120.0	~~125.0~~	120.0	8	~~145.0~~	~~145.0~~	145.0	145.0	6	265.0
7	William Langford	Guyana	A	76.67	107.5	112.5	117.5	117.5	10	137.5	~~142.5~~	142.5	142.5	7	260.0
8	James Stewart	Northern Ireland	A	75.83	105.0	110.0	115.0	115.0	11	~~135.0~~	135.0	140.0	140.0	8	255.0
9	Kevin Cassar	Malta	A	76.88	107.5	~~112.5~~	~~112.5~~	107.5	12	127.5	~~132.5~~	132.5	132.5	10	240.0
10	Jack Odongo	Kenya	A	75.47	~~95.0~~	~~95.0~~	95.0	95.0	13	120.0	130.0	135.0	135.0	9	230.0
–	Damian Brown	Australia	A	76.35	142.5	145.0	147.5	147.5	1st place, gold medalist(s)	~~175.0~~	~~175.0~~	~~177.5~~	–	–	–
–	Craig Blythman	Australia	A	76.66	135.0	~~142.5~~	~~142.5~~	135.0	3rd place, bronze medalist(s)	~~160.0~~	~~160.0~~	~~162.5~~	–	–	–
–	Quincy Detenamo	Nauru	A	76.39	122.5	~~127.5~~	127.5	127.5	6	~~162.5~~	~~162.5~~	~~162.5~~	–	–	–
DSQ ^{1}	Satheesha Rai	India	A	76.00				142.5	–				175.0	–	317.5

^{1} Rai originally won the bronze medal at snatch and gold medals at clean & jerk and total, but was disqualified after he tested positive for strychnine.
