= Weightlifting at the 2002 Commonwealth Games – Men's 85 kg =

Weightlifting – Men's 85 kg at the 2002 Commonwealth Games
- Venue: Manchester International Convention Centre
- Dates: 1 August 2002
- Competitors: 17 from 12 nations
- Winning total weight: 340

Medalists
gold medal	David Matam	Cameroon
silver medal	Anthony Arthur	England
bronze medal	Ofisa Ofisa	Samoa

The Men's 85 kg weightlifting event at the 2002 Commonwealth Games took place at the Manchester International Convention Centre on 1 August 2002. The weightlifter from Cameroon won the gold, with a combined lift of 340 kg.

== Schedule ==
All times are Coordinated Universal Time (UTC)

Date	Time	Event
1 August 2002	19:00	Group A

== Records ==
Prior to this competition, the existing world, Commonwealth and Games records were as follows:

World record	Snatch	Andrei Rybakou (BLR)	182.5 kg	Havířov, Czech Republic	2 June 2002
World record	Clean & Jerk	Zhang Yong (CHN)	218.0 kg	Ramat Gan, Israel	25 April 1998
World record	Total	World Standard	395.0 kg	–	1 January 1998
Commonwealth record	Snatch				
Commonwealth record	Clean & Jerk				
Commonwealth record	Total				
Games record	Snatch	Stephen Ward (ENG)	157.5 kg	Kuala Lumpur, Malaysia	18 September 1998
Games record	Clean & Jerk	Leon Griffin (ENG)	192.5 kg	Kuala Lumpur, Malaysia	18 September 1998
Games record	Total	Leon Griffin (ENG)	347.5 kg	Kuala Lumpur, Malaysia	18 September 1998

== Results ==
Rank	Athlete	Nation	Group	Body weight	Snatch (kg)					Clean & Jerk (kg)					Total
Rank	Athlete	Nation	Group	Body weight	1	2	3	Result	Rank	1	2	3	Result	Rank	Total
1st place, gold medalist(s)	David Matam	Cameroon	A	84.42	150.0	155.0	~~160.0~~	155.0	1st place, gold medalist(s)	~~185.0~~	~~185.0~~	185.0	185.0	1st place, gold medalist(s)	340.0
2nd place, silver medalist(s)	Anthony Arthur	England	A	84.44	145.0	150.0	~~157.5~~	150.0	2nd place, silver medalist(s)	~~175.0~~	175.0	180.0	180.0	3rd place, bronze medalist(s)	330.0
3rd place, bronze medalist(s)	Ofisa Ofisa	Samoa	A	83.37	140.0	~~145.0~~	~~145.0~~	140.0	4	180.0	~~185.0~~	~~185.0~~	180.0	2nd place, silver medalist(s)	320.0
4	Niusila Opeloge	Samoa	A	83.91	137.5	~~142.5~~	142.5	142.5	3rd place, bronze medalist(s)	~~170.0~~	170.0	~~177.5~~	170.0	6	312.5
5	Robert Campbell	Australia	A	84.47	132.5	~~137.5~~	137.5	137.5	5	162.5	167.5	~~172.5~~	167.5	9	305.0
6	Grant Cavit	New Zealand	A	83.32	130.0	~~135.0~~	~~137.5~~	130.0	6	165.0	170.0	~~175.0~~	170.0	5	300.0
7	Rutherford Jeremiah	Nauru	A	81.07	117.5	~~122.5~~	125.0	125.0	8	160.0	167.5	~~175.0~~	167.5	8	292.5
8	Julian McWatt	Guyana	A	83.52	122.5	127.5	130.0	130.0	7	145.0	152.5	~~155.0~~	152.5	11	282.5
9	Ray Vaughan	Wales	A	84.26	115.0	120.0	~~125.0~~	120.0	10	150.0	155.0	~~160.0~~	155.0	10	275.0
10	Sean Cozier	Guyana	A	83.67	117.5	122.5	125.0	125.0	9	145.0	~~150.0~~	~~150.0~~	145.0	13	270.0
11	David Obiero	Kenya	A	84.03	100.0	105.0	110.0	110.0	11	140.0	150.0	~~155.0~~	150.0	12	260.0
12	Can Osman	Cyprus	A	84.51	105.0	~~110.0~~	~~110.0~~	105.0	12	~~132.5~~	~~132.5~~	132.5	132.5	14	237.5
13	Omar Sheriff	Sierra Leone	A	83.26	90.0	100.0	~~105.0~~	100.0	13	~~120.0~~	~~125.0~~	125.0	125.0	16	225.0
14	Ambrose Johnson	Sierra Leone	A	81.34	90.0	~~100.0~~	~~100.0~~	90.0	14	110.0	120.0	125.0	125.0	15	215.0
15	Ray Ikitoemata	Niue	A	82.95	~~70.0~~	75.0	80.0	80.0	15	90.0	95.0	100.0	100.0	17	180.0
–	Stephen Ward	England	A	84.92	~~145.0~~	~~145.0~~	~~145.0~~	–	–	175.0	~~182.5~~	~~182.5~~	175.0	4	–
–	Andy Goswell	Wales	A	84.10	~~140.0~~	~~140.0~~	~~140.0~~	–	–	170.0	~~175.0~~	~~175.0~~	170.0	7	–
