= 1998 World Weightlifting Championships – Men's 77 kg =

The 1998 World Weightlifting Championships were held in Lahti, Finland from 7 to 15 November 1998. The men's competition in the middleweight (77 kg) division was staged on 12 November 1998.

== Medalists ==
| Event | Gold | | Silver | | Bronze | |
|---|---|---|---|---|---|---|
| Snatch | Giorgi Asanidze (GEO) | 167.5 kg | Mehmet Yılmaz (TUR) | 165.0 kg | Zlatan Vanev (BUL) | 162.5 kg |
| Clean & Jerk | Zlatan Vanev (BUL) | 202.5 kg | Petar Tanev (BUL) | 202.5 kg | Viktor Mitrou (GRE) | 202.5 kg |
| Total | Zlatan Vanev (BUL) | 365.0 kg | Petar Tanev (BUL) | 362.5 kg | Mehmet Yılmaz (TUR) | 360.0 kg |

== Records ==
Prior to this competition, the existing world records were as follows.

| World Record | Snatch | World Standard | 167.5 kg | — | 1 January 1998 |
| World Record | Clean & Jerk | World Standard | 205.0 kg | — | 1 January 1998 |
| World Record | Total | World Standard | 372.5 kg | — | 1 January 1998 |

== Results ==
| Rank | Athlete | Body weight | Snatch (kg) | | | | Clean & Jerk (kg) | | | | Total |
| Rank | Athlete | Body weight | 1 | 2 | 3 | Rank | 1 | 2 | 3 | Rank | Total |
|---|---|---|---|---|---|---|---|---|---|---|---|
| 1st place, gold medalist(s) | Zlatan Vanev (BUL) | 76.14 | 157.5 | 162.5 | ~~165.0~~ | 3rd place, bronze medalist(s) | ~~200.0~~ | 200.0 | 202.5 | 1st place, gold medalist(s) | 365.0 |
| 2nd place, silver medalist(s) | Petar Tanev (BUL) | 76.48 | 150.0 | 155.0 | 160.0 | 8 | 192.5 | 197.5 | 202.5 | 2nd place, silver medalist(s) | 362.5 |
| 3rd place, bronze medalist(s) | Mehmet Yılmaz (TUR) | 76.32 | 157.5 | ~~162.5~~ | 165.0 | 2nd place, silver medalist(s) | 185.0 | ~~195.0~~ | 195.0 | 7 | 360.0 |
| 4 | Viktor Mitrou (GRE) | 76.90 | 157.5 | ~~162.5~~ | ~~162.5~~ | 11 | 195.0 | 202.5 | ~~205.0~~ | 3rd place, bronze medalist(s) | 360.0 |
| 5 | Ingo Steinhöfel (GER) | 76.55 | 155.0 | 160.0 | 162.5 | 4 | 187.5 | 195.0 | ~~197.5~~ | 8 | 357.5 |
| 6 | Giorgi Asanidze (GEO) | 76.66 | 160.0 | 165.0 | 168.0 | 1st place, gold medalist(s) | 190.0 | ~~195.0~~ | ~~195.0~~ | 13 | 357.5 |
| 7 | Arkadiusz Smółka (POL) | 75.78 | ~~155.0~~ | 155.0 | 160.0 | 6 | 190.0 | 195.0 | ~~197.5~~ | 6 | 355.0 |
| 8 | Khachatur Kyapanaktsyan (ARM) | 76.61 | 162.5 | ~~167.5~~ | ~~167.5~~ | 5 | ~~187.5~~ | 187.5 | 192.5 | 10 | 355.0 |
| 9 | Idalberto Aranda (CUB) | 76.46 | 145.0 | 150.0 | 152.5 | 14 | 195.0 | 200.0 | ~~205.5~~ | 5 | 352.5 |
| 10 | Rǎzvan Ilie (ROM) | 76.09 | ~~160.0~~ | 160.0 | ~~162.5~~ | 7 | 190.0 | ~~195.0~~ | ~~195.0~~ | 11 | 350.0 |
| 11 | Oleg Kechko (BLR) | 76.91 | ~~150.0~~ | 150.0 | 155.0 | 13 | 185.0 | 190.0 | 195.0 | 9 | 350.0 |
| 12 | Arsen Melikyan (ARM) | 76.65 | 152.5 | 157.5 | ~~162.5~~ | 10 | 190.0 | ~~195.0~~ | ~~197.5~~ | 12 | 347.5 |
| 13 | Oscar Chaplin (USA) | 76.62 | 145.0 | 150.0 | ~~152.5~~ | 15 | 175.0 | 182.5 | ~~185.0~~ | 15 | 332.5 |
| 14 | Rafat Galal (EGY) | 76.90 | 145.0 | ~~150.0~~ | 150.0 | 17 | 177.5 | 182.5 | ~~185.0~~ | 16 | 332.5 |
| 15 | Ringo Gossmann (GER) | 76.62 | 145.0 | ~~150.0~~ | ~~150.0~~ | 18 | 180.0 | 185.0 | ~~190.0~~ | 14 | 330.0 |
| 16 | Viktor Gumán (SVK) | 76.88 | 145.0 | 150.0 | ~~155.0~~ | 16 | 172.5 | 177.5 | ~~182.5~~ | 17 | 327.5 |
| 17 | Mauro Scifo (ITA) | 76.20 | 130.0 | 135.0 | 137.5 | 19 | 170.0 | 175.0 | ~~177.5~~ | 18 | 312.5 |
| 18 | Scott McCarthy (CAN) | 76.33 | ~~127.5~~ | 127.5 | 132.5 | 21 | 157.5 | 162.5 | ~~165.0~~ | 20 | 295.0 |
| 19 | Tsai Hung-chang (TPE) | 76.68 | 130.0 | 135.0 | ~~137.5~~ | 20 | ~~160.0~~ | 160.0 | ~~165.0~~ | 22 | 295.0 |
| 20 | Guy Hamilton (CAN) | 76.92 | 125.0 | ~~130.0~~ | 130.0 | 23 | 165.0 | ~~170.0~~ | ~~170.0~~ | 19 | 295.0 |
| 21 | Marcelo Gandolfo (ARG) | 75.46 | 130.0 | ~~135.0~~ | ~~137.5~~ | 22 | 160.0 | ~~170.0~~ | ~~170.0~~ | 21 | 290.0 |
| 22 | Quincy Detenamo (NRU) | 76.81 | 115.0 | 120.0 | ~~125.0~~ | 25 | 155.0 | 160.0 | ~~165.0~~ | 23 | 280.0 |
| 23 | Redjean Clerc (SUI) | 75.31 | 120.0 | ~~125.0~~ | ~~125.0~~ | 24 | 150.0 | 155.0 | ~~160.0~~ | 24 | 275.0 |
| 24 | Mladen Bužančić (CRO) | 76.90 | ~~110.0~~ | 110.0 | ~~117.5~~ | 26 | 140.0 | 150.0 | — | 25 | 260.0 |
| — | Oleg Perepetchenov (RUS) | 76.80 | 155.0 | ~~160.0~~ | 160.0 | 9 | ~~192.5~~ | ~~192.5~~ | ~~195.0~~ | — | — |
| — | Attila Feri (HUN) | 76.74 | 155.0 | ~~160.0~~ | ~~160.0~~ | 12 | ~~200.0~~ | ~~200.0~~ | ~~200.0~~ | — | — |
| — | Zhan Xugang (CHN) | 76.67 | ~~155.0~~ | ~~155.0~~ | ~~160.0~~ | — | ~~200.0~~ | 200.0 | ~~202.5~~ | 4 | — |

== New records ==
| Snatch | 168.0 kg | Giorgi Asanidze (GEO) | WR |
