= Weightlifting at the 1998 Commonwealth Games =

- Venue: Mines Convention Centre, Selangor
- Location: Kuala Lumpur, Malaysia
- Dates: 11 to 21 September 1998

Weightlifting at the 1998 Commonwealth Games was the 13th appearance of Weightlifting at the Commonwealth Games. The events were held in Kuala Lumpur, Malaysia, from 11 to 21 September 1998 and featured contests in eight weight classes.

The weightlifting events were held at the Mines Convention Centre in Selangor. For the third consecutive Games, the format consisted of three gold medals per weight category (snatch, clean and jerk and overall) which had been introduced in 1990. Twenty-four gold medals were therefore available in just eight weight categories.

Australia topped the weightlifting medal table by virtue of winning six gold medals.

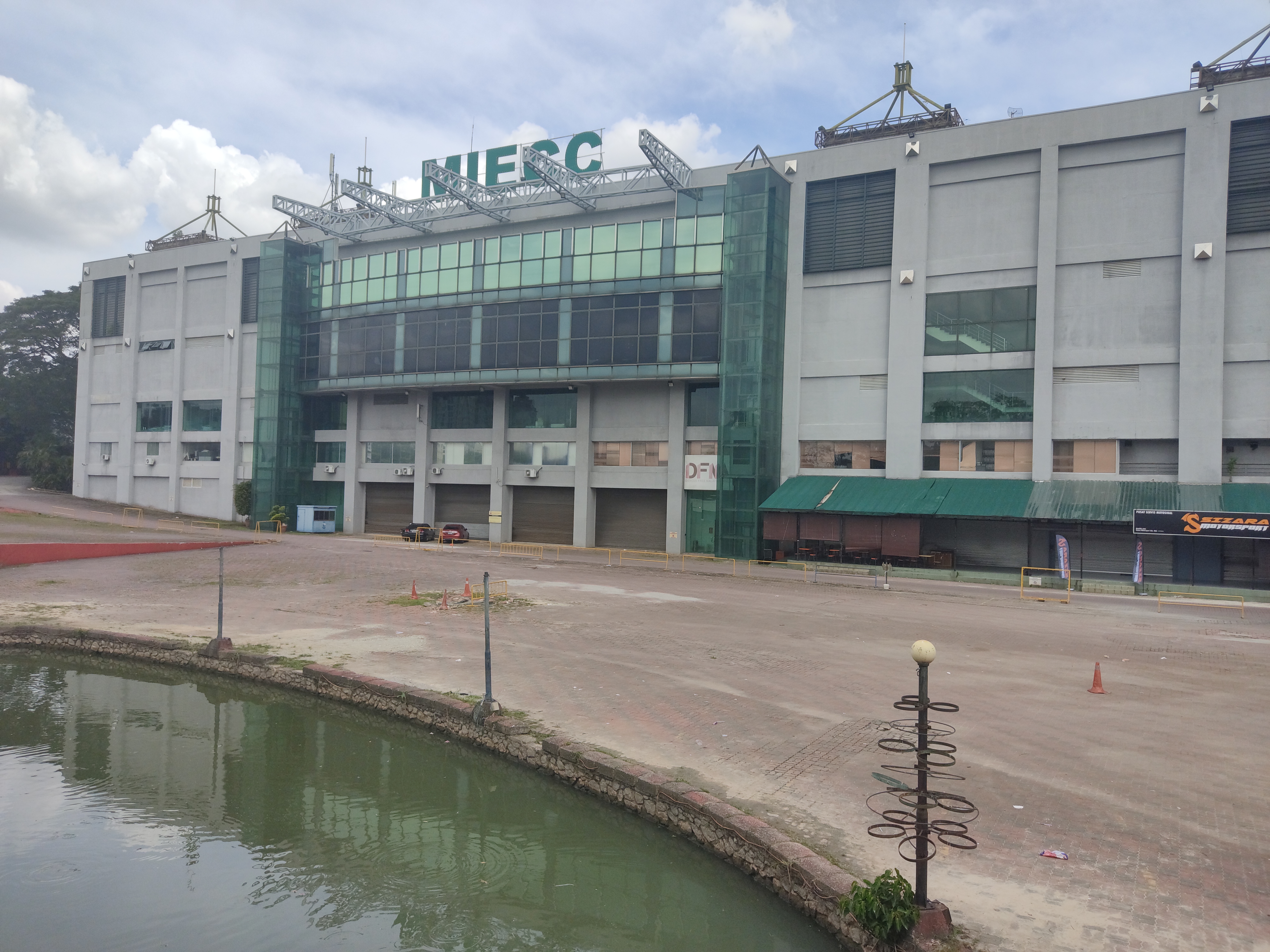
The Mines Convention Centre in 2021

== Medal table ==
* Host nation (Malaysia)

| Rank | Nation | Gold | Silver | Bronze | Total |
|---|---|---|---|---|---|
| 1 | Australia | 6 | 4 | 6 | 16 |
| 2 | Canada | 5 | 1 | 2 | 8 |
| 3 | England | 3 | 11 | 2 | 16 |
| 4 | India | 3 | 5 | 5 | 13 |
| 5 | New Zealand | 3 | 0 | 2 | 5 |
| 6 | Nauru | 3 | 0 | 0 | 3 |
| 7 | Malaysia* | 1 | 1 | 3 | 5 |
| 8 | Cameroon | 0 | 1 | 3 | 4 |
| 9 | Wales | 0 | 1 | 1 | 2 |
| Totals (9 entries) | | 24 | 24 | 24 | 72 |

== Medallists ==
| Event | Gold | Silver | Bronze |
|---|---|---|---|
56 kg
| snatch | Mehmet Yağcı; Australia | Arumugam K. Pandian; India | Matin Guntali; Malaysia |
| clean and jerk | Dharmaraj Wilson; India | Arumugam K. Pandian; India | Matin Guntali; Malaysia |
| combined | Arumugam K. Pandian; India | Dharmaraj Wilson; India | Matin Guntali; Malaysia |
62 kg
| snatch | Marcus Stephen; Nauru | Yurik Sarkisyan; Australia | Ganapathy Gnanasekar; India |
| clean and jerk | Marcus Stephen; Nauru | Yurik Sarkisyan; Australia | Murugesan Arun; India |
| combined | Marcus Stephen; Nauru | Yurik Sarkisyan; Australia | Murugesan Arun; India |
69 kg
| snatch | Sebastien Groulx; Canada | Stewart Cruickshank; England | Tony Morgan; Wales |
| clean and jerk | Muhamad Hidayat Hamidon; Malaysia | Sebastien Groulx; Canada | G. Vadivelu; India |
| combined | Sebastien Groulx; Canada | Muhamad Hidayat Hamidon; Malaysia | Sandeep Kumar; India |
77 kg
| snatch | Satheesha Rai; India | Dave Morgan; Wales | Damian Brown; Australia |
| clean and jerk | Damian Brown; Australia | Satheesha Rai; India | Alain Bilodeau; Canada |
| combined | Damian Brown; Australia | Satheesha Rai; India | Alain Bilodeau; Canada |
85 kg
| snatch | Stephen Ward; England | Leon Griffin; England | David Matam Matam; Cameroon |
| clean and jerk | Leon Griffin; England | Stephen Ward; England | David Matam Matam; Cameroon |
| combined | Leon Griffin; England | Stephen Ward; England | David Matam Matam; Cameroon |
94 kg
| snatch | Kiril Kounev; Australia | Anthony Arthur; England | Simon Heffernan; Australia |
| clean and jerk | Kiril Kounev; Australia | Andy Callard; England | Simon Heffernan; Australia |
| combined | Kiril Kounev; Australia | Andy Callard; England | Simon Heffernan; Australia |
105 kg
| snatch | Akos Sandor; Canada | Thomas Yule; England | Nigel Avery; New Zealand |
| clean and jerk | Akos Sandor; Canada | Thomas Yule; England | Karl Grant; England |
| combined | Akos Sandor; Canada | Thomas Yule; England | Nigel Avery; New Zealand |
+105 kg
| snatch | Darren Liddel; New Zealand | Giles Greenwood; England | Christopher Rae; Australia |
| clean and jerk | Darren Liddel; New Zealand | Jean Bilong; Cameroon | Christopher Rae; Australia |
| combined | Darren Liddel; New Zealand | Christopher Rae; Australia | Giles Greenwood; England |

== Results ==
- Athletes listed in overall position

=== 56 kg ===
| Pos | Athlete | Clean & jerk | Snatch | Overall kg |
|---|---|---|---|---|
| 1 | Arumugam K. Pandian (IND) | 137.5 | 107.5 | 245.0 |
| 2 | Dharmaraj Wilson (IND) | 140.0 | 102.5 | 242.5 |
| 3 | Martin Guntali (MAS) | 135.0 | 105.0 | 240.0 |
| 4 | Johnny Nguyen (AUS) | 132.5 | 105.0 | 237.5 |
| 5 | Mehmet Yağcı (AUS) | 125.0 | 107.5 | 232.5 |
| 6 | François Lagacé (CAN) | 117.5 | 97.5 | 215.0 |
| 7 | Pearce Wesley (PNG) | 115.0 | 90.0 | 205.0 |
| 8 | Jeffrey Robby (PNG) | 112.5 | 87.5 | 200.0 |
| 9 | Willem Philips (RSA) | 110.0 | 90.0 | 200.0 |
| 10 | Greg Gerts (RSA) | 105.0 | 90.0 | 195.0 |
| 11 | Gino Sooprayen (MRI) | 100.0 | 95.0 | 195.0 |
| 12 | Abdul Rahman Ahmad (MAS) | x | 105.0 | 105.0 |
| 13 | James Kaleli (KEN) | x | 85.0 | 85.0 |
| 14 | Alan Ogilive (SCO) | x | x | 0 |

=== 62 kg ===
| Pos | Athlete | Clean & jerk | Snatch | Overall kg |
|---|---|---|---|---|
| 1 | Marcus Stephen (NRU) | 167.5 | 125.0 | 292.5 |
| 2 | Yurik Sarkisyan (AUS) | 157.5 | 125.0 | 282.5 |
| 3 | Arun Murugesan (IND) | 155.0 | 117.5 | 272.5 |
| 4 | Ganapathy Gnanasekar (IND) | 145.0 | 117.5 | 262.5 |
| 5 | Kamaruzaman Mohd Jusan (MAS) | 127.5 | 117.5 | 245.0 |
| 6 | Terry Hughes (NZL) | 137.5 | 105.0 | 242.5 |
| 7 | James Power (NIR) | 117.5 | 95.0 | 212.5 |
| 8 | Harrison Nyirenda (ZAM) | 120.0 | 90.0 | 210.0 |
| 9 | Phillip Jikoutai (PNG) | 115.0 | 90.0 | 205.0 |
| 10 | Zarques Francis (RSA) | 110.0 | 95.0 | 205.0 |
| 11 | Temwaree Toaare (KIR) | 110.0 | 80.0 | 190.0 |
| 12 | Dennis O'Brien (SCO) | 117.5 | x | 117.5 |
| 13 | Ryan Erasmus (RSA) | x | 95.0 | 95.0 |

=== 69 kg ===
| Pos | Athlete | Clean & jerk | Snatch | Overall kg |
|---|---|---|---|---|
| 1 | Sébastien Groulx (CAN) | 167.5 | 130.0 | 297.5 |
| 2 | Muhamad Hidayat Hamidon (MAS) | 167.5 | 127.5 | 295 |
| 3 | Sandeep Kumar (IND) | 160.0 | 125.0 | 285.0 |
| 4 | Samson Matam (CMR) | 155.0 | 125.0 | 280.0 |
| 5 | Tony Morgan (WAL) | 150.0 | 130.0 | 280.0 |
| 6 | Govindaswamy Vadivelu (IND) | 162.0 | 115.5 | 277.5 |
| 7 | Fomai Sililo (SAM) | 140.0 | 120.0 | 260.0 |
| 8 | Romeo Simeon (SEY) | 137.5 | 110.0 | 247.5 |
| 9 | Kassim Mulindwa (UGA) | 130.0 | 110.0 | 240.0 |
| 10 | Martin Boland (SCO) | 127.5 | 107.5 | 235.0 |
| 11 | Joseph Sade Vira (FIJ) | 130.0 | 105.0 | 235.0 |
| 12 | Arfon Roberts (WAL) | 125.0 | 100.0 | 225.0 |
| 13 | Eken Karamaia (KIR) | 120.0 | 95.0 | 215.0 |
| 14 | Stewart Cruickshank (ENG) | x | 130.0 | 130.0 |
| 15 | Mohd Rosdim Ngah (MAS) | x | 117.5 | 117.5 |

=== 77 kg ===
| Pos | Athlete | Clean & jerk | Snatch | Overall kg |
|---|---|---|---|---|
| 1 | Damian Brown (AUS) | 187.5 | 140 | 327.5 |
| 2 | Satheesha Rai (IND) | 175.0 | 147.5 | 322.5 |
| 3 | Alain Bilodeau (CAN) | 167.5 | 137.5 | 305.0 |
| 4 | Ofisa Ofisa (SAM) | 165.0 | 135.0 | 300.0 |
| 5 | Guy Hamilton (CAN) | 165.0 | 132.5 | 297.5 |
| 6 | Marius Hardiman (WAL) | 155.0 | 130.0 | 285.0 |
| 7 | Quincy Detenamo (NRU) | 162.5 | 120.0 | 282.5 |
| 8 | Alistair Farr (NZL) | 160.0 | 120.0 | 280.0 |
| 9 | Trent Dabwido (NRU) | 150.0 | 110.0 | 260.0 |
| 10 | Paul Coyle (SCO) | 145.0 | 112.5 | 257.5 |
| 11 | Thabo Makhatu (SWZ) | 120.0 | 95.0 | 215.0 |
| 12 | Rozlimand Haron (MAS) | 150.0 | x | 150.0 |
| 13 | Dave Morgan (WAL) | x | 145.0 | 145.0 |
| 14 | David Obiero (KEN) | 130.0 | x | 130.0 |
| 15 | Dominic Mutale (ZAM) | x | 95.0 | 95.0 |

=== 85 kg ===
| Pos | Athlete | Clean & jerk | Snatch | Overall kg |
|---|---|---|---|---|
| 1 | Leon Griffin (ENG) | 192.5 | 155.0 | 347.5 |
| 2 | Stephen Ward (ENG) | 187.5 | 157.5 | 345.0 |
| 3 | David Matam (CMR) | 180.0 | 147.5 | 327.5 |
| 4 | Robert Doucet (CAN) | 175.0 | 142.5 | 317.5 |
| 5 | Rupeni Varea (FIJ) | 175.0 | 135.0 | 310.0 |
| 6 | James Swann (NZL) | 170.0 | 140.0 | 310.0 |
| 7 | Edmund Yeo (MAS) | 165.0 | 132.5 | 297.5 |
| 8 | Neil Taylor (WAL) | 150.0 | 122.5 | 272.5 |
| 9 | Pieter Smith (RSA) | 150.0 | 120.0 | 270.0 |
| 10 | Daniel Diringa (NRU) | 147.5 | 120.0 | 267.5 |

=== 94 kg ===
| Pos | Athlete | Clean & jerk | Snatch | Overall kg |
|---|---|---|---|---|
| 1 | Kiril Kounev (AUS) | 205.0 | 165.0 | 370.0 |
| 2 | Andy Callard (ENG) | 190.0 | 150.0 | 340.0 |
| 3 | Simon Heffernan (AUS) | 185.0 | 150.0 | 335.0 |
| 4 | Anthony Arthur (ENG) | 175.0 | 152.5 | 327.5 |
| 5 | Sacha Amede (CAN) | 170.0 | 147.5 | 317.5 |
| 6 | Rodin Thoma (NRU) | 177.5 | 137.5 | 315.0 |
| 7 | Dalas Santavy (CAN) | 175.0 | 130.0 | 305.0 |
| 8 | Stuart Yule (SCO) | 167.5 | 130.0 | 297.5 |
| 9 | Elvis Jeanne (SEY) | 160.0 | 130.0 | 290.0 |
| 10 | Robert Earwicker (WAL) | 157.5 | 130.0 | 287.5 |
| 11 | Martin Fiay (PNG) | 160.0 | 120.0 | 280.0 |
| 12 | T. Viliami (TON) | 155.0 | 120.0 | 275.0 |
| 13 | T. M. U. Jayatilake (SRI) | 160.0 | 110.0 | 270.0 |
| 14 | Paul Odongo (KEN) | 150.0 | 120.0 | 270.0 |
| 15 | Jonathan Roberts (WAL) | 155.0 | x | 155.0 |
| 16 | Matam Alphonse (CMR) | x | 145.0 | 145.0 |
| 17 | David Murray (SCO) | x | 127.5 | 127.5 |

=== 105 kg ===
| Pos | Athlete | Clean & jerk | Snatch | Overall kg |
|---|---|---|---|---|
| 1 | Akos Sandor (CAN) | 192.5 | 167.5 | 360.0 |
| 2 | Thomas Yule (ENG) | 190.0 | 160.0 | 350.0 |
| 3 | Nigel Avery (NZL) | 185.0 | 155.0 | 340.0 |
| 4 | Karl Grant (ENG) | 187.5 | 150.0 | 337.5 |
| 5 | McGregor Hall (AUS) | 182.5 | 142.5 | 325.0 |
| 6 | Gareth Hives (WAL) | 170.0 | 140.0 | 310.0 |
| 7 | Thomas Neil (SCO) | 165.0 | 132.5 | 297.5 |
| 8 | Gerard Garabwan (NRU) | 170.0 | 125.0 | 295.0 |
| 9 | Kamran Majid (PAK) | 165.0 | 127.5 | 292.5 |
| 10 | Che Mohd Azrol Bin Che Mat (MAS) | 160.0 | 122.5 | 282.5 |
| 11 | Atantaake Bureka (KIR) | 135.0 | 117.5 | 252.5 |
| 12 | Steven Baccus (SEY) | 172.5 | x | 172.5 |
| 13 | Kolinau Makahili (TON) | x | 135.0 | 135.0 |

=== +105 kg ===
| Pos | Athlete | Clean & jerk | Snatch | Overall kg |
|---|---|---|---|---|
| 1 | Darren Liddel (NZL) | 202.5 | 165.0 | 367.5 |
| 2 | Chris Rae (AUS) | 192.5 | 160.0 | 352.5 |
| 3 | Giles Greenwood (ENG) | 190.0 | 162.5 | 352.5 |
| 4 | Jean Bilong (CMR) | 192.5 | 145.0 | 337.5 |
| 5 | Isca Kam (NRU) | 187.5 | 142.5 | 330.0 |
| 6 | Phil Silverman (NZL) | 175.0 | 142.5 | 317.5 |
| 7 | Kemp Detenamo (NRU) | 177.5 | 135.0 | 312.5 |
| 8 | Shirish Rummun (MRI) | 170.0 | 140.0 | 310.0 |
| 9 | Ali Kavuma (UGA) | 150.0 | 105.0 | 255.0 |
| 10 | Talona Taua (SAM) | x | 142.5 | 142.5 |

== See also ==
- List of Commonwealth Games medallists in weightlifting
