= 2002 World Weightlifting Championships – Men's 85 kg =

The 2002 World Weightlifting Championships were held in Warsaw, Poland from 19 November to 26 November. The men's 85 kilograms division was staged on 23 November 2002.

== Schedule ==
Date	Time	Event
23 November 2002	09:00	Group C
23 November 2002	11:00	Group B
23 November 2002	17:00	Group A

== Medalists ==
Event	Gold		Silver		Bronze	
Snatch	Giorgi Asanidze (GEO)	177.5 kg	Ilirjan Suli (ALB)	175.0 kg	Ruslan Novikau (BLR)	172.5 kg
Clean & Jerk	Zlatan Vanev (BUL)	217.5 kg	Ruslan Novikau (BLR)	207.5 kg	Valeriu Calancea (ROM)	207.5 kg
Total	Zlatan Vanev (BUL)	385.0 kg	Giorgi Asanidze (GEO)	385.0 kg	Ruslan Novikau (BLR)	380.0 kg

== Records ==
Prior to this competition, the existing world records were as follows.

World record	Snatch	Andrei Rybakou (BLR)	182.5 kg	Havířov, Czech Republic	2 June 2002
World record	Clean & Jerk	Zhang Yong (CHN)	218.0 kg	Ramat Gan, Israel	25 April 1998
World record	Total	World Standard	395.0 kg	—	1 January 1998

== Results ==
Rank	Athlete	Group	Body weight	Snatch (kg)				Clean & Jerk (kg)				Total
Rank	Athlete	Group	Body weight	1	2	3	Rank	1	2	3	Rank	Total
1st place, gold medalist(s)	Zlatan Vanev (BUL)	A	83.45	165.0	167.5	~~170.0~~	8	212.5	217.5	~~220.0~~	1st place, gold medalist(s)	385.0
2nd place, silver medalist(s)	Giorgi Asanidze (GEO)	A	84.90	~~172.5~~	172.5	177.5	1st place, gold medalist(s)	~~202.5~~	205.0	207.5	4	385.0
3rd place, bronze medalist(s)	Ruslan Novikau (BLR)	A	84.35	165.0	170.0	172.5	3rd place, bronze medalist(s)	200.0	205.0	207.5	2nd place, silver medalist(s)	380.0
4	Ilirjan Suli (ALB)	A	84.65	167.5	172.5	175.0	2nd place, silver medalist(s)	197.5	202.5	205.0	7	380.0
5	Valeriu Calancea (ROM)	A	84.35	165.0	170.0	~~172.5~~	5	~~205.0~~	~~207.5~~	207.5	3rd place, bronze medalist(s)	377.5
6	Mariusz Rytkowski (POL)	A	84.60	~~167.5~~	167.5	172.5	4	202.5	205.0	~~210.0~~	6	377.5
7	Yuan Aijun (CHN)	B	84.65	165.0	170.0	~~172.5~~	6	200.0	~~207.5~~	~~207.5~~	11	370.0
8	Ilir Kafarani (ALB)	B	84.40	~~157.5~~	~~162.5~~	162.5	15	195.0	205.0	~~210.0~~	5	367.5
9	Hadi Panzvan (IRI)	A	84.90	160.0	165.0	~~170.0~~	13	~~202.5~~	202.5	~~205.0~~	8	367.5
10	Ayhan Çiçek (TUR)	B	83.45	155.0	160.0	165.0	10	190.0	200.0	~~202.5~~	10	365.0
11	Oscar Chaplin (USA)	B	84.35	155.0	160.0	~~165.0~~	18	190.0	~~197.5~~	197.5	12	357.5
12	György Ehrlich (HUN)	B	84.50	160.0	~~165.0~~	165.0	12	180.0	190.0	192.5	14	357.5
13	Jiang Hairong (CHN)	B	82.75	~~165.0~~	165.0	~~175.0~~	9	~~190.0~~	190.0	~~195.0~~	15	355.0
14	Héctor Ballesteros (COL)	C	83.30	150.0	155.0	~~157.5~~	20	192.5	200.0	~~205.0~~	9	355.0
15	Anatoliy Mushyk (UKR)	B	83.45	157.5	~~162.5~~	162.5	14	190.0	~~195.0~~	~~195.0~~	16	352.5
16	Volodymyr Bondar (UKR)	B	83.50	155.0	160.0	~~165.0~~	17	190.0	~~200.0~~	~~200.0~~	17	350.0
17	José Llerena (ECU)	C	84.65	~~145.0~~	145.0	150.0	23	~~190.0~~	~~190.0~~	190.0	18	340.0
18	Francesco De Tommaso (ITA)	C	84.90	150.0	~~155.0~~	~~155.0~~	24	~~190.0~~	~~190.0~~	190.0	19	340.0
19	Kazumi Suzuki (JPN)	C	83.75	145.0	~~150.0~~	150.0	22	185.0	~~190.0~~	~~190.0~~	20	335.0
20	Pavol Trojčák (SVK)	C	84.80	~~140.0~~	~~140.0~~	140.0	25	~~170.0~~	170.0	~~180.0~~	21	310.0
21	Deniss Žuļins (LAT)	C	81.90	135.0	~~140.0~~	~~140.0~~	26	~~165.0~~	165.0	~~170.0~~	22	300.0
22	Yuki Hiraoka (JPN)	C	85.00	130.0	135.0	~~137.5~~	27	165.0	~~170.0~~	~~170.0~~	23	300.0
23	Carl Dumas (CAN)	C	81.20	~~130.0~~	130.0	~~135.0~~	28	155.0	~~160.0~~	~~160.0~~	24	285.0
—	Karol Gorczyczewski (POL)	B	83.35	~~147.5~~	~~147.5~~	—	—	—	—	—	—	—
—	Iraklis Psomiadis (GRE)	A	84.35	160.0	165.0	~~170.0~~	11	~~200.0~~	~~200.0~~	~~205.0~~	—	—
—	Ondrej Kutlík (SVK)	A	84.35	~~155.0~~	155.0	~~162.5~~	21	~~195.0~~	—	—	—	—
—	Tigran Kamalyan (ARM)	B	84.55	~~150.0~~	~~150.0~~	~~150.0~~	—	195.0	~~205.0~~	~~205.0~~	13	—
—	Georgios Markoulas (GRE)	B	84.85	157.5	~~162.5~~	—	19	—	—	—	—	—
—	Aslanbek Ediev (RUS)	A	84.85	170.0	~~175.0~~	~~175.0~~	7	~~202.5~~	~~202.5~~	~~202.5~~	—	—
—	Natig Hasanov (AZE)	B	85.00	162.5	~~165.0~~	~~165.0~~	16	~~192.5~~	~~192.5~~	~~192.5~~	—	—
