= Weightlifting at the 2000 Commonwealth Youth Games =

Weightlifting at the I Commonwealth Youth Games
- Dates: 11 – 13 August
- Host city: Edinburgh, Scotland
- Venue: Meadowmill Sports Centre (East Lothian)
- Events: 3 across 8 weight categories
- Participation: 35 athletes from 8 nations

At the 2000 Commonwealth Youth Games, the weightlifting events were held at the Meadowbank Stadium in Edinburgh, Scotland from 11 to 13 August. The Weightlifting competition is held under the rules of the International Weightlifting Federation (IWF)

Not all weight categories had a full complement of athletes. Medals reflect the final results for each weight class. Only boys aged 14–18 were able to compete in this event.

== Medal summary ==
=== Medal table ===
* Host nation ( SCO)

Rank	Nation	Gold	Silver	Bronze	Total
1	NRU	17	2	0	19
2	NZL	6	0	0	6
3	ENG	1	7	1	9
4	RSA	0	9	2	11
5	AUS	0	6	6	12
6	SCO*	0	0	3	3
Totals (6 entries)		24	24	12	60

== Medallists ==
Event	Gold	Silver	Bronze
105 kg+
Snatch	C.Dongobar; Nauru 125 kg		
Clean and Jerk	C.Dongobar; Nauru 160 kg		
Combined	C.Dongobar; Nauru 280 kg		
105 kg
Snatch	Heinz Baker; New Zealand 140 kg		
Clean and Jerk	Heinz Baker; New Zealand 167.5 kg		
Combined	Heinz Baker; New Zealand 295 kg		
94 kg
Snatch	Zinzael Agir; Nauru 120 kg	Rahil Hannan; South Africa 107.5 kg	Luke Strevett; Australia 102.5 kg
Clean and Jerk	Zinzael Agir; Nauru 152.5 kg	Rahil Hannan; South Africa 132.5 kg	Luke Strevett; Australia 122.5 kg
Combined	Zinzael Agir; Nauru 272.5 kg	Rahil Hannan; South Africa 240 kg	Luke Strevett; Australia 225 kg
85 kg
Snatch	Richard Jones; New Zealand 120 kg	Robbie Montaldo; Australia 102.5 kg	Gary McLean; Scotland 95 kg
Clean and Jerk	Richard Jones; New Zealand 140 kg	Robbie Montaldo; Australia 115 kg	Gary McLean; Scotland 110 kg
Combined	Richard Jones; New Zealand 260 kg	Robbie Montaldo; Australia 217.5 kg	Gary McLean; Scotland 205 kg
77 kg
Snatch	Renos Doweiya; Nauru 110 kg	Mike Causer; England 97.5 kg Jason Power; Australia 97.5 kg	
Clean and Jerk	Renos Doweiya; Nauru 132.5 kg	Mike Causer; England 125 kg Jason Power; Australia 125 kg	
Combined	Renos Doweiya; Nauru 242.5 kg	Mike Causer; England 222.5 kg Jason Power; Australia 22.5 kg	
69 kg
Snatch	Indy Kheeler; England 112.5 kg	Yukio Peter; Nauru 107.5 kg	Bradley Tate; Australia 100 kg
Clean and Jerk	Yukio Peter; Nauru 142.5 kg	Indy Kheeler; England 135 kg	Bradley Tate; Australia 120 kg
Combined	Yukio Peter; Nauru 250 kg	Indy Kheeler; England 247.5 kg	Bradley Tate; Australia 220 kg
62 kg
Snatch	Etsjit Cook; Nauru 95 kg	Russell Davies; England 87.5 kg	Reagan Brauns; South Africa 85 kg
Clean and Jerk	Etsjit Cook; Nauru 117.5 kg	Russell Davies; England 107.5 kg	Reagan Brauns; South Africa 105 kg
Combined	Gad Teabuge; Nauru 215 kg	Etsjit Cook; Nauru 212.5 kg	Russell Davies; England 195 kg
56 kg
Snatch	Chako Daniel; Nauru 80 kg	Arno Roems; South Africa 70 kg Sam Cox; South Africa 70 kg	
Clean and Jerk	Chako Daniel; Nauru 107.5 kg	Arno Roems; South Africa 90 kg Sam Cox; South Africa 90 kg	
Combined	Chako Daniel; Nauru 187.5 kg	Arno Roems; South Africa 170 kg Sam Cox; South Africa 170 kg	
