= Blythman =

Blythman is an English surname. Notable people with the surname include:

- Craig Blythman (born 1970), Australian weightlifter
- Joanna Blythman (born 1956), British journalist
- Morris Blythman (1919–1981), Scottish poet
