= Murgesan Veerasamy =

Indian weightlifter

Personal information
- Nationality: Indian

Sport
- Sport: Weightlifting
Medal record
Men's weightlifting
Representing India
Event / 1st / 2nd / 3rd; Commonwealth Games / 1 / 1 / 1
Commonwealth Games
Gold medal – first place	1994 Victoria	54 kg snatch
Silver medal – second place	1994 Victoria	54 kg overall
Bronze medal – third place	1994 Victoria	54 kg clean & jerk

Murgesan Veerasamy is an Indian weightlifter. He competed in the men's 54 kg flyweight category at the 1994 Commonwealth Games in Victoria, British Columbia, winning a gold medal in the snatch, a silver medal in the overall competition and a bronze medal in the clean and jerk.

At the 1994 Commonwealth Games, Veerasamy lifted 105 kg (231 lb) in the snatch to win the gold medal, and set a new Commonwealth Games record. He lifted 127.5 kg (281 lb) in the clean and jerk and 232.5 kg (513 lb) overall in the men's 54 kg category. He finished second overall behind compatriot Badathala Adisekhar, who recorded 237.5 kg (524 lb).
