= Zlatan Vanev =

Bulgarian weightlifter (born 1973)

Personal information
- Full name: Zlatаn Vanev Vasilev
- Born: 29 March 1973 (age 53) Shumen, Bulgaria
- Height: 168 cm (5 ft 6 in)
- Weight: 83.45 kg (184.0 lb)

Sport
- Country: Bulgaria
- Sport: Weightlifting
- Weight class: 85 kg
- Club: Shumen
- Team: National team
Medal record
Representing Bulgaria
World Championships
Gold medal – first place	1997 Cheang Mai	-70 kg
Gold medal – first place	1998 Lahti	-77 kg
Gold medal – first place	2002 Warsaw	-85 kg
European Championships
Gold medal – first place	1996 Sravanger	-70 kg
Gold medal – first place	1998 Riesa	-77 kg
Gold medal – first place	2000 Sofia	-77 kg
Gold medal – first place	2003 Loutraki	-85 kg
Silver medal – second place	1997 Rijeka	-70 kg
Silver medal – second place	2002 Antalya	-77 kg
World Junior Championships
Silver medal – second place	1993 Cheb	-70 kg
European Junior Championships
Silver medal – second place	1992 Cardiff	-67,5 kg
Silver medal – second place	1993 Valencia	-76 kg
- Updated on 26 September 2016

Zlatаn Vanev Vasilev (original name: Златан Ванев Василев, born 29 March 1973 in Shumen) is a former Bulgarian weightlifter who became a three-time world and four-time European champion. Vanev is world champion from Chiang Mai 1997, Lahti 1998 and Warsaw 2002. Vanev is also a world record holder. In 2000 Vanev hit a world record clean and jerk of 208.5 kg in the 77 kg weight class in Sofia. Two years later as an 85 kg lifter Vanev clean and jerked 217.5 kg in Warsaw. He became famous for becoming world champion in three different categories - 70 kg, 77 kg and 85 kg. His European titles are from Stavanger 1996, Riesa 1998, Sofia 2000 and Loutraki 2003. He was suspended due to a tampering with test.

After his own career he became the personal trainer of weightlifter Valentin Hristov.

== Major results ==
Year	Venue	Weight	Snatch (kg)				Clean & Jerk (kg)				Total	Rank
Year	Venue	Weight	1	2	3	Rank	1	2	3	Rank	Total	Rank
Summer Olympics
1996	Atlanta, United States	70 kg	150	~~155~~	~~155~~	—N/a	180	~~185~~	~~185~~	—N/a	330	9
World Championships
2002	Warsaw, Poland	85 kg	165	167.5	~~170~~	8	212.5	217.5	~~220~~	1st place, gold medalist(s)	385	1st place, gold medalist(s)
1999	Piraeus, Greece	77 kg	157.5	~~162.5~~	~~162.5~~	14	197.5	~~212.5~~	~~212.5~~	8	355	9
1998	Lahti, Finland	77 kg	157.5	162.5	~~165~~	3rd place, bronze medalist(s)	~~200~~	200	202.5	1st place, gold medalist(s)	365	1st place, gold medalist(s)

Records
Preceded by (China) Zhan Xugang	Men's 77 kg World Record Holder (C&J); 28 April 2000 – 27 April 2001	Succeeded by (Russia) Oleg Perepetchenov
