= Ben Devonshire =

English weightlifter

Personal information
- Nationality: English
- Born: 1972 Huddersfield
- Died: 9 March 2017 (aged 45)
Medal record
Weightlifting
Representing England
Commonwealth Games
| Bronze medal – third place | 1994 Victoria | 59kg clean & jerk |

William Benjamin Devonshire (1972 – 2017) was a male weightlifter who competed for England.

== Weightlifting career ==
Devonshire represented England and won a bronze medal in the 59 kg clean and jerk division, at the 1994 Commonwealth Games in Victoria.

== Personal life ==
He was a detective constable for the Cambridgeshire Police by trade. He died in 2017.
