= Andrew Callard =

British weightlifter (born 1968)

Personal information
- Full name: Andrew John Callard
- Nationality: United Kingdom
- Born: 4 January 1968 (age 58) Dartford, United Kingdom
- Height: 178 cm (5 ft 10 in)
- Weight: 93.58 kg (206.3 lb)

Sport
- Country: Great Britain; England
- Sport: Weightlifting
- Weight class: 94 kg
- Club: Orpington & Dartford Weightlifting Club
- Team: National team
Medal record
weightlifting
Representing England
Commonwealth Games
Bronze medal – third place	1990 Auckland	82.5kg light-heavyweight
Gold medal – first place	(x2) 1994 Victoria	99kg sub-heavyweight
Silver medal – second place	(x2) 1998 Kuala Lumpur	94kg sub-heavyweight

Andrew John Callard (born 4 January 1968 in Dartford) is a British male weightlifter.

== Weightlifting career ==
Callard competed in the light-heavyweight and sub-heavyweight categories and represented Great Britain and England at international competitions. He participated at the 1992 Summer Olympics in the 82.5 kg event. He competed at world championships, most recently at the 1999 World Weightlifting Championships.

He represented England and won a bronze medal in the 82.5 kg light-heavyweight division, at the 1990 Commonwealth Games in Auckland, New Zealand. Four years later he won two silver medals in the 99 kg sub-heavyweight division, at the 1994 Commonwealth Games and two gold medals at the 1998 Commonwealth Games, the double medal count at each Games was courtesy of an unusual period when three medals were awarded in one category (clean and jerk, snatch and combined) which invariably led to the same athlete winning all three of the same colour medal.

== Major results ==
Year	Venue	Weight	Snatch (kg)				Clean & Jerk (kg)				Total	Rank
Year	Venue	Weight	1	2	3	Rank	1	2	3	Rank	Total	Rank
Summer Olympics
1992	Barcelona, Spain	82.5 kg				—N/a				—N/a		20
World Championships
1999	Piraeus, Greece	94 kg	142.5	147.5	~~150~~	40	182.5	187.5	~~192.5~~	31	335	34
1998	Lahti, Finland	94 kg	140	~~145~~	~~145~~	25	175	180	---	21	320	20
