= Oleg Kechko =

Belarusian weightlifter

Personal information
- Full name: Oleg Nikolayevich Kechko
- Born: 28 August 1967 (age 58) Minsk, Belarus
- Weight: 76.91 kg (169.6 lb)
- Website: blissfulolegnkechko.wordpress.com

Sport
- Country: Belarus
- Sport: Weightlifting
- Weight class: 77 kg
- Team: National team
- Updated on 3 October 2016

Oleg Nikolayevich Kechko (Олег Николаевич Кечко, born 28 August 1967 in Minsk) is an International Master of Sport and Belarusian male weightlifter, competing in the 77 kg category and representing Belarus at international competitions. He participated at the 1996 Summer Olympics in the 76 kg event. He competed at world championships, most recently at the 1998 World Weightlifting Championships.

== Major results ==
(silver) - 1993 European Championships Middleweight class (360.0 kg)

Year	Venue	Weight	Snatch (kg)				Clean & Jerk (kg)				Total	Rank
Year	Venue	Weight	1	2	3	Rank	1	2	3	Rank	Total	Rank
Summer Olympics
1996	Atlanta, United States	76 kg				—N/a				—N/a		11
World Championships
1998	Lahti, Finland	77 kg	~~150~~	150	155	13	185	190	195	9	350	11
