= Redjean Clerc =

Swiss weightlifter (born 1970)

Personal information
- Full name: Redjean Clerc
- Born: 1 January 1970 (age 56)
- Weight: 76.43 kg (168.5 lb)

Sport
- Country: Switzerland
- Sport: Weightlifting
- Weight class: 77 kg
- Team: National team
- Updated on 2 October 2016

Redjean Clerc (born 1 January 1970) is a Swiss male weightlifter, competing in the 77 kg category and representing Switzerland at international competitions. He competed at world championships, most recently at the 1999 World Weightlifting Championships.

== Major results ==
Year	Venue	Weight	Snatch (kg)				Clean & Jerk (kg)				Total	Rank
Year	Venue	Weight	1	2	3	Rank	1	2	3	Rank	Total	Rank
World Championships
1999	Piraeus, Greece	77 kg	120	~~127.5~~	~~127.5~~	57	150	155	157.5	48	277.5	50
1998	Lahti, Finland	77 kg	120	~~125~~	~~125~~	24	150	155	~~160~~	24	275	23
