= Chris Rae =

Australian weightlifter (born 1980)

Personal information
- Nationality: Australian
- Born: 20 July 1980 (age 45) Adelaide, Australia

Sport
- Sport: Weightlifting
Medal record
Weightlifting
Representing Australia
Commonwealth Games
Bronze medal – third place	1998 Kuala Lumpur	+105kg Snatch
Bronze medal – third place	1998 Kuala Lumpur	+105kg Clean & jerk
Silver medal – second place	1998 Kuala Lumpur	+105kg Combined - Men
Bronze medal – third place	2002 Manchester	+105kg Snatch
Gold medal – first place	2006 Melbourne	+105kg Combined

Chris Rae (born 20 July 1980) is an Australian former weightlifter. He competed in the men's super heavyweight event at the 2000 Summer Olympics.
