= Sreenath Sreenivasan =

American academic (born 1970)

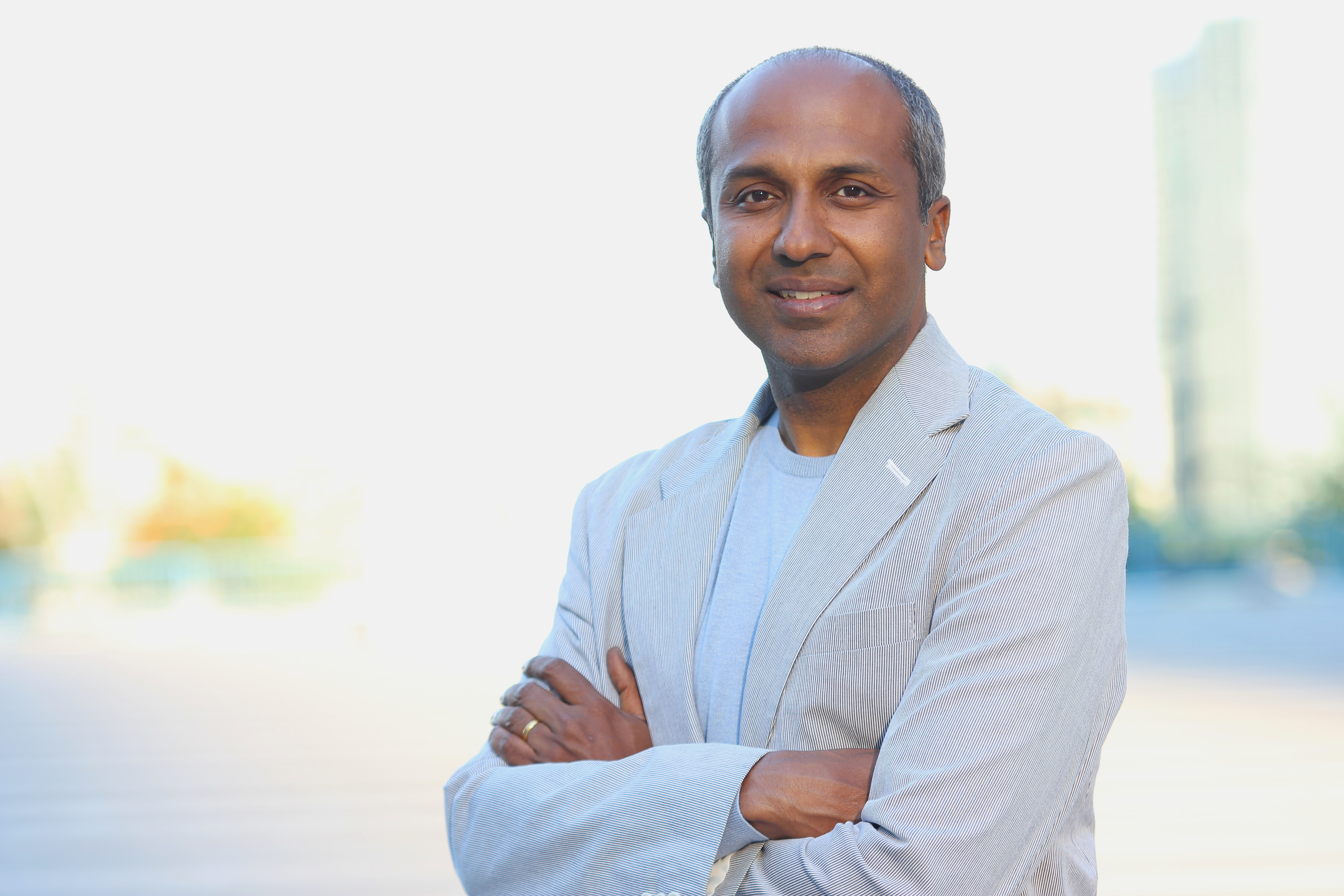
- Sree Sreenivasan in New York, July 2016
- Born: October 28, 1970 (age 55); Tokyo, Japan
- Citizenship: U.S.A.
- Education: Columbia University, St. Stephen's College
- Employer: Stony Brook University
- Spouse: Roopa Unnikrishnan
- Children: 2
- Parent(s): T. P. Sreenivasan, Lekha Sreenivasan
- Website: https://www.digimentors.group/

Sreenath "Sree" Sreenivasan (born October 28, 1970) is an academic and practitioner in journalism and communications, serving as the inaugural Marshall R. Loeb visiting professor at Stony Brook University School of Journalism in New York. He was previously chief digital officer at the Metropolitan Museum of Art and chief digital officer of Columbia University. He also served as chief digital officer of the City of New York from October 2016 through May 2017. He has been a technology journalist based in New York City and served as an academic administrator and professor in the Columbia University Graduate School of Journalism. In 2015, he was named one of Fast Company magazine's Most Creative People of the year. He was also identified as the most influential Chief Digital Officer of 2016 by CDO Club.

== Early life ==
Sreenivasan was born in Tokyo, Japan, to Indian Malayali parents T. P. Sreenivasan, Indian former diplomat, and Lekha Sreenivasan, both hailing from Thiruvananthapuram, Kerala, India. He grew up in USSR, United States, Fiji, and India. His family often relocated due to his father being a diplomat for the Indian government, he later retired. He attended kindergarten in Moscow; P.S. 6, a public elementary school, in Manhattan; Marist Brothers High School in Suva, Fiji; and St. Stephen's College in Delhi, India. He received a Master of Science degree in journalism from the Columbia University Graduate School of Journalism in 1993.

== Career ==
Sreenivasan was on the faculty of the Columbia University Graduate School of Journalism from 1993 to 2013 as a professor of professional practice. His courses at Columbia focused on new media, web design, and social media in the practice of journalism, as well as media entrepreneurship. As an adjunct professor in subsequent years, he ran workshops for professional journalists on the advanced use of the Internet and multimedia reporting.

In 2005, Sreenivasan was appointed dean of students at the journalism school, overseeing student-oriented programs. He is the former advisor to the school's chapter of the Society of Professional Journalists and won the David Eshelman Award for Outstanding Campus Advisor in 1998. In 2008, he was named dean of student affairs, supervising admissions, student services and career services at the school. On July 11, 2012, Columbia University named Sreenivasan its first chief digital officer.

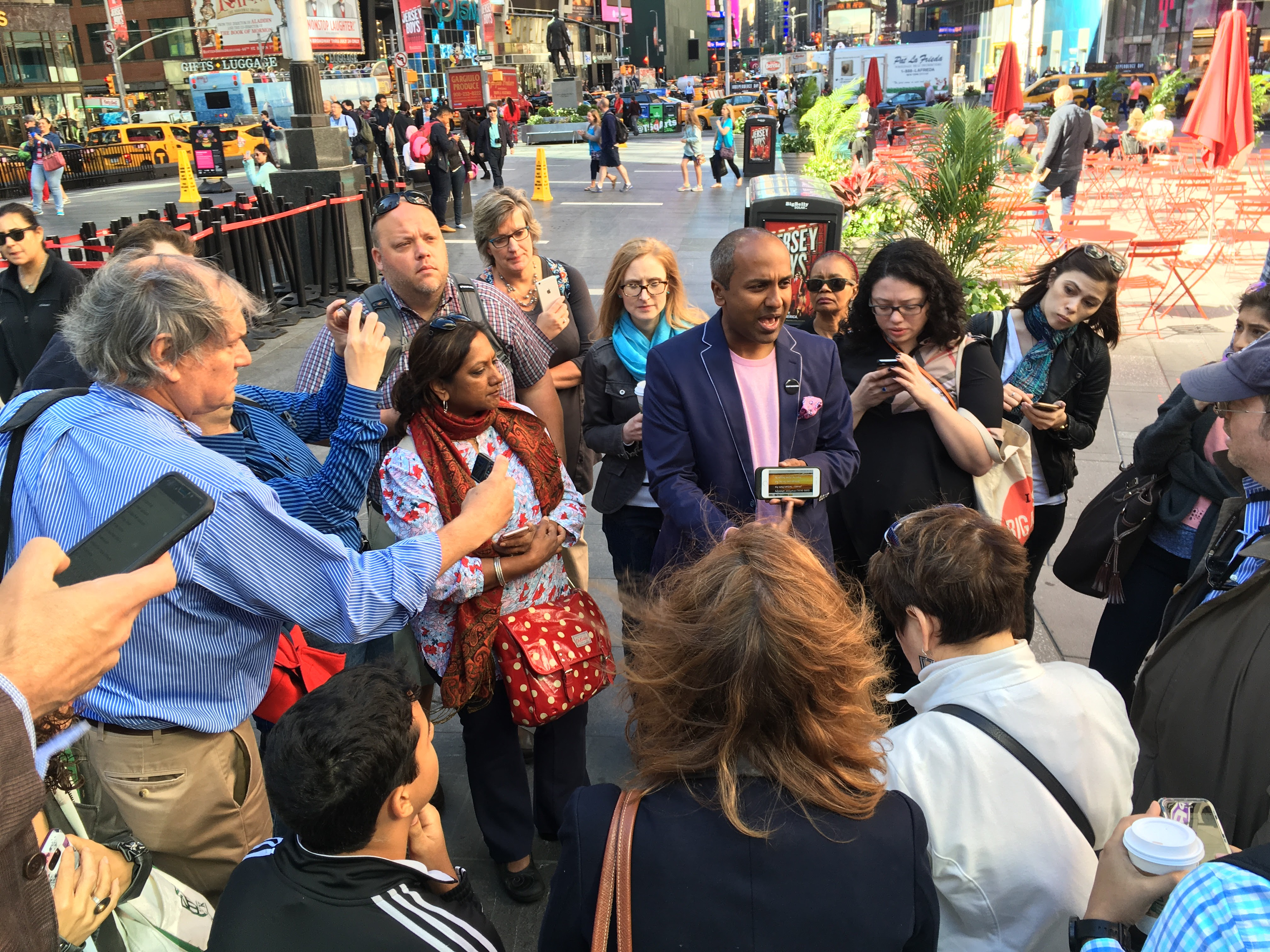
Sree Sreenivasan teaching a social media class in Times Square, NYC

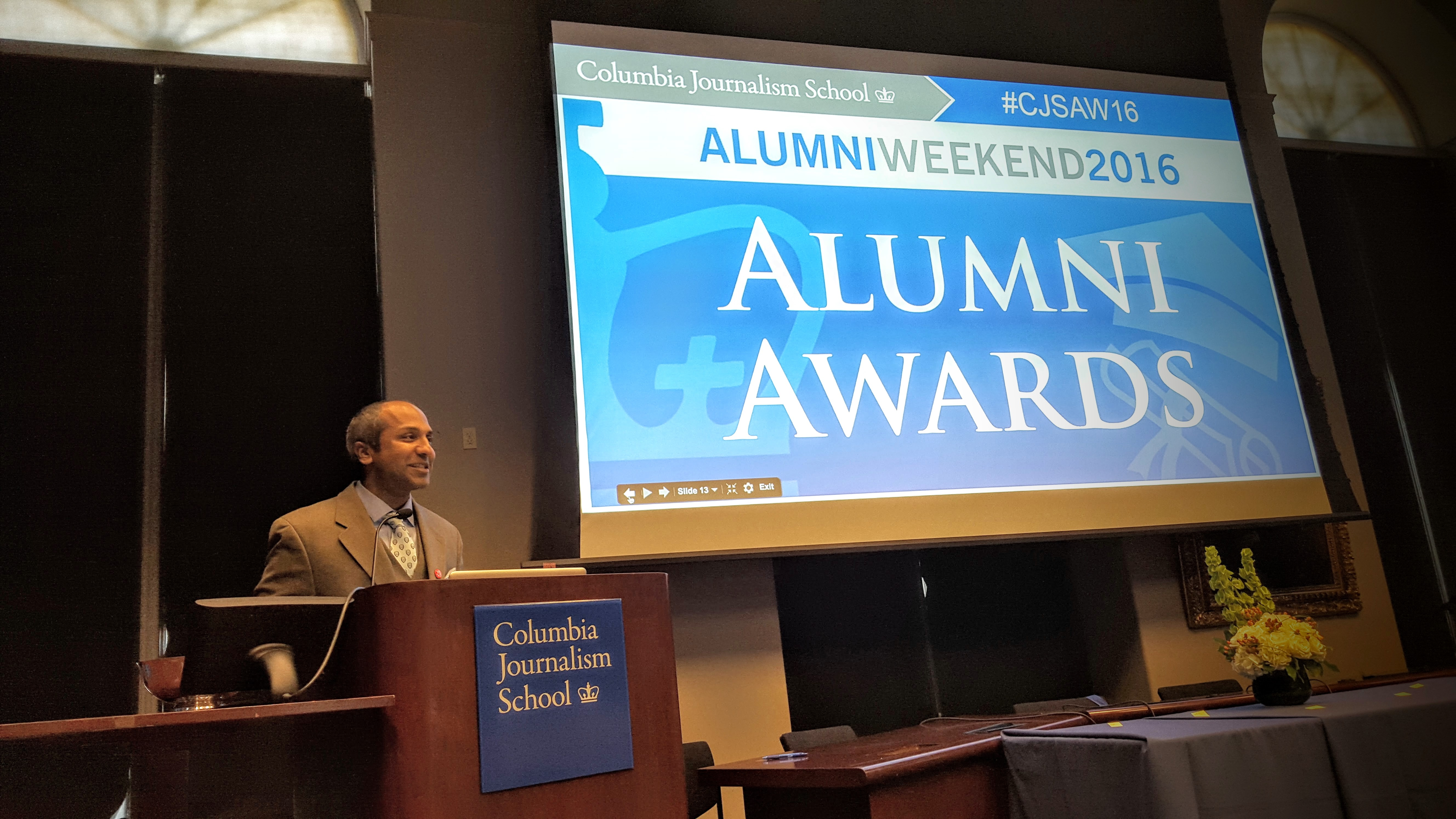
Sree Sreenivasan giving address at 2016 Columbia Journalism Alumni Awards

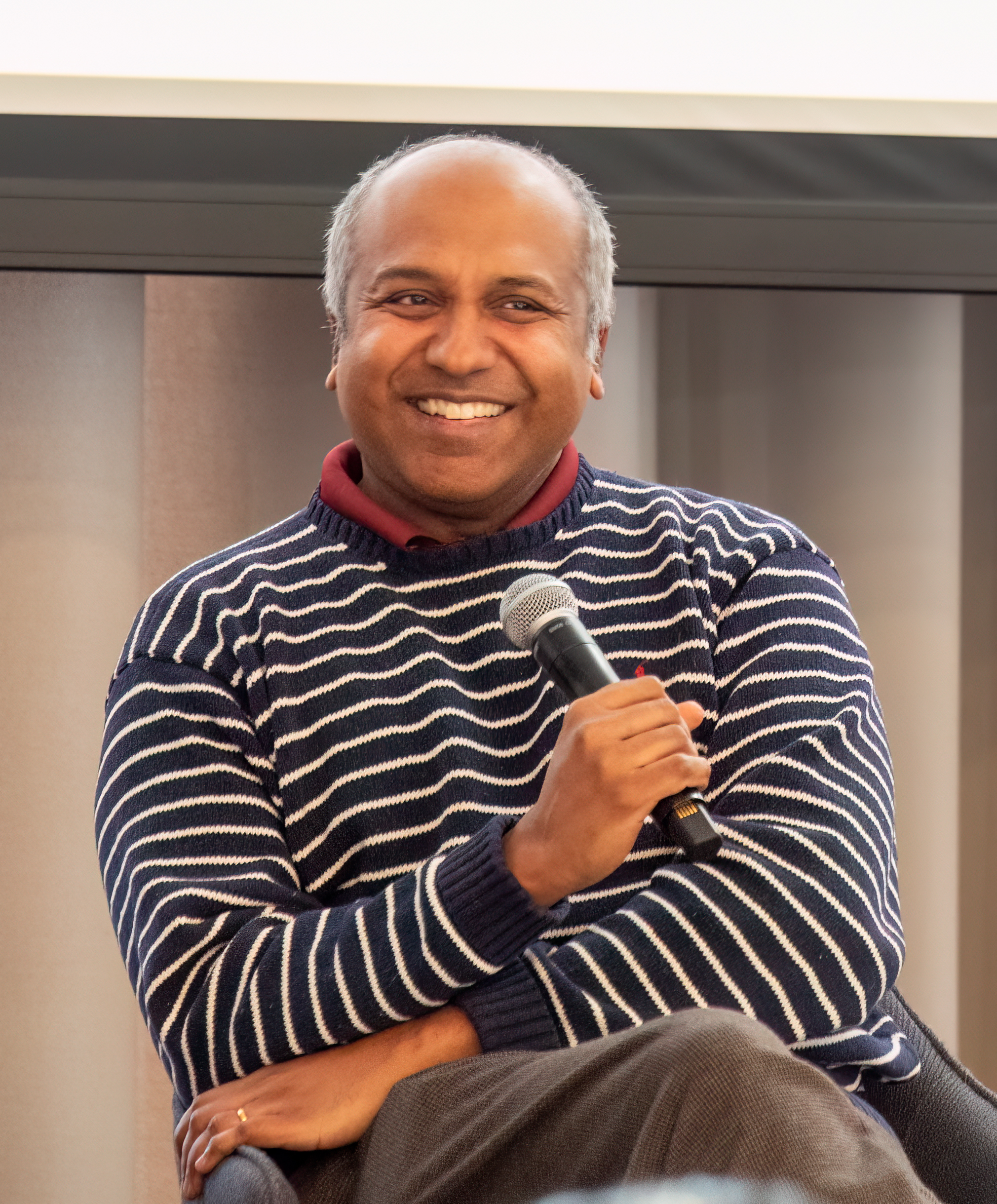
Sreenivasan speaking at a Wikipedia event at Columbia University in 2024

Sreenivasan was appointed the Metropolitan Museum of Art's Chief Digital Officer in August 2013. In this role he supervised 70 employees throughout the museum.

Sreenivasan helped found SAJA, the South Asian Journalists Association, a group of more than 1,000 journalists of South Asian origin in the U.S. and Canada. He was the association's first president and continues to sit on its board, while also serving as an editor and writer of SAJAforum, one of the most widely read South Asian news and analysis blogs. He was also named by "UNITY: Journalists of Color" in a seed list of one of the 100 top journalists of the century.

For six years, he was WABC-TV's "Tech Guru", before moving to WNBC-TV in January 2007 to become its technology reporter. He appeared twice a week on air and on WNBC.com until January 2009. From 2009 through 2011, Sreenivasan helped launch and develop DNAinfo.com, a hyper-local Manhattan-centric news startup, launched by TD Ameritrade founder and Chicago Cubs owner Joe Ricketts.

He has contributed more than 50 articles to The New York Times on business and technology, and has hosted more than 40 episodes of his own podcast, the @SREE SHOW, for CBS Radio.

In May 2016, Sreenivasan made news headlines by spearheading an effort to boycott participation in all-male panels, conferences, and events. He would later update this to also pledging not to attend any all-male panels.

In 2016, after three years at the top digital post at the Metropolitan Museum of Art, he announced he was leaving amidst the museum's financial troubles. Although Met president Daniel Weiss called Sreenivasan "a superstar", the museum faced a looming deficit, hovering between $9 million and $10 million. This financial predicament led the Met to part ways with Sreenivasan and other high-profile executives, such as Cynthia Round, its senior vice president for marketing and external relations, and Susan Sellers, head of design. At the Met, Sreenivasan led the redesign of their website and the development of a smartphone app.

On August 1, 2016, Sreenivasan was named chief digital officer of New York City by its mayor, Bill de Blasio. He left the role on May 12, 2017.

== Accolades ==
- In 2004, Newsweek magazine named him one of the 20 most influential South Asians in the U.S.
- In 2007, India Abroad named him one of the 50 most Influential Indian Americans in the U.S.
- In 2009, he was named one of AdAge's 25 media people to follow on Twitter
- In 2010, Quill magazine, published by the Society of Professional Journalists, named him one of 20 journalists to follow on Twitter
- In 2010, he was named one of Poynter Institute's 35 most influential people in social media
- In 2015, he was named one of Fast Company magazine's Most Creative People of the year at number 39.
- In 2016, he won the Columbia University School of Journalism Alumni Award

== Personal life ==
He became a US Citizen in 2013. He is married to Roopa Unnikrishnan.

== See also ==
- Indians in the New York City metropolitan region
- New Yorkers in journalism
