= Karl Grant =

English weightlifter

Personal information
- Nationality: English
- Born: 1970
Medal record
Weightlifting
Representing England
Commonwealth Games
Bronze medal – third place	1998 Kuala Lumpur	109kg clean & jerk
Bronze medal – third place	2002 Manchester	94kg clean & jerk

Karl Grant (born 1970), is a male former weightlifter who competed for England.

== Weightlifting career ==
Grant represented England at the 1998 Commonwealth Games in Kuala Lumpur, Malaysia and won a bronze medal in the 109 Kg clean and jerk. Four years later he won another bronze medal in the clean and jerk at the 2002 Commonwealth Games.
