= Royal Theatre (Victoria, British Columbia) =

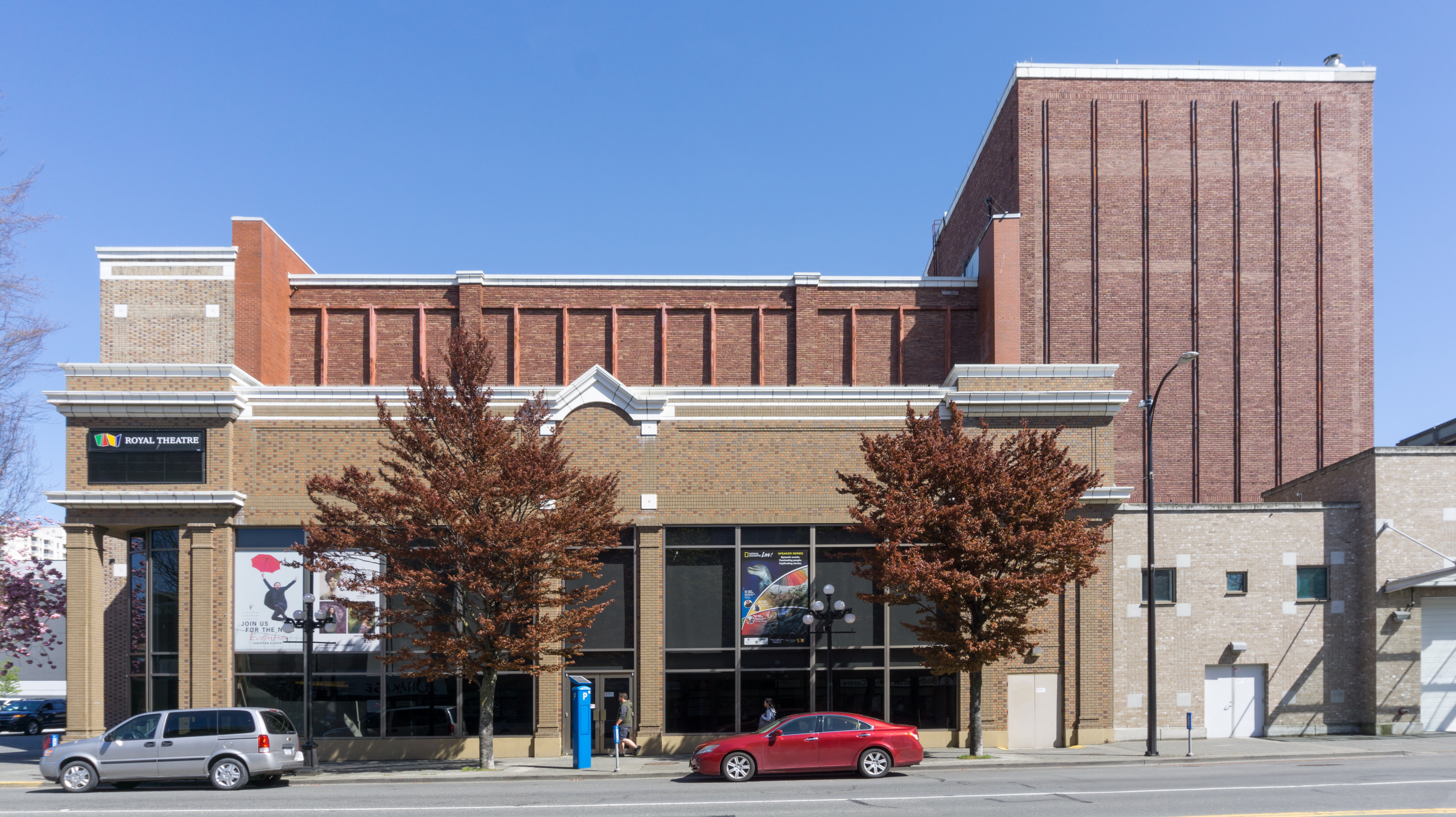
- The Royal Theatre in Victoria, British Columbia
- Interactive map of Royal Theatre
- Location: 805 Broughton Street; Victoria, British Columbia; V8W 1E5
- Coordinates: 48°25′23.6″N 123°21′44.4″W
- Built: 1913
- Original use: Proscenium Arch Theatre intended for Drama and Concert production
- Current use: Same
- Architect: William D'Oyly Hamilton Rochfort and Eben W. Sankey
- Governing body: The Royal and McPherson Theatre Society
- Website: Official Site

National Historic Site of Canada
- Designated: 1987

The Royal Theatre is a proscenium arch theatre and concert hall located in Victoria, British Columbia, Canada. It was designed in 1912 by William D'Oyly Hamilton Rochfort and Eben W. Sankey. Rochfort was very active as an architect in Victoria from 1908 until he left for the war in 1914. Opened in 1913, the theatre has operated under many guises, including cinema (1917–1981; operated during some of that time by Famous Players), in 1972 the Municipalities of Oak Bay, Saanich and Victoria purchased the theatre from Famous Players. Since 1982, it has become one of the finest touring destinations in Canada with a fully modernized production department and box office system, while maintaining the grace and style that an early 20th century provides.

The theatre was designated a National Historic Site of Canada in 1987.

The weightlifting events for the 1994 Commonwealth Games were held at the Theatre.

Today, the theatre has a capacity of 1,416. It is a popular venue, staging concerts, and musicals, featuring the best of local and international productions.

== Notable visiting performers ==
- Sarah Bernhardt
- Carlos Montoya
- Mikhail Baryshnikov
- Luciano Pavarotti
- Roger Hodgson
- "Weird Al" Yankovic
- Crosby Stills and Nash
- Herbie Hancock
- Jethro Tull (band)
- Mavis Staples
- Hiromi Uehara
- Gregory Porter
- John Cleese
- Chris Cornell
- Whose Line Is It Anyway
- Broadway Touring
- Local Opera Productions
- International Touring Dance

== See also ==
- List of historic places in Victoria, British Columbia
