= Simon Heffernan =

Australian weightlifter (born 1975)

Personal information
- Full name: Simon Francis Heffernan
- Nickname: Franco Haffer
- Born: 17 May 1975 (age 51)
- Weight: 93.16 kg (205.4 lb)

Sport
- Country: Australia
- Sport: Weightlifting
- Weight class: 94 kg
- Team: National team
Medal record
Weightlifting
Representing Australia
Commonwealth Games
Bronze medal – third place	1998 Kuala Lumpur	94 kg Snatch
Bronze medal – third place	1998 Kuala Lumpur	94 kg Clean & jerk
Bronze medal – third place	1998 Kuala Lumpur	94 kg Combined
Silver medal – second place	2006 Melbourne	94 kg Combined

Simon Francis Heffernan (born 17 May 1975) is an Australian male weightlifter, competing in the 94 kg category and representing Australia at international competitions. He competed at world championships, most recently at the 2003 World Weightlifting Championships.

== Major results ==
Year	Venue	Weight	Snatch (kg)				Clean & Jerk (kg)				Total	Rank
Year	Venue	Weight	1	2	3	Rank	1	2	3	Rank	Total	Rank
World Championships
2003	Vancouver, Canada	94 kg	~~140~~	~~140~~	140	36	~~180~~	180	~~187.5~~	29	320	29
1998	Lahti, Finland	94 kg	~~130~~	130	137.5	26	170	177.5	182.5	17	320	19
