= Kuheli Gangulee =

Indian sport shooter

Personal information
- Nationality: Indian
- Born: 4 September 1970 (age 55) Calcutta, West Bengal, India

Sport
- Sport: Shooting
Medal record
Women's shooting
Representing India
Event	1st	2nd	3rd
South Asian Games	1	0	0
Commonwealth Games	0	0	1
South Asian Games
Gold medal – first place	2016 Guwahati	50 m rifle prone
Commonwealth Games
Bronze medal – third place	1994 Victoria	50 m small bore rifle three positions – pairs

Kuheli Gangulee (born 4 September 1970) is an Indian sport shooter who competed in rifle shooting events. She won the bronze medal in the women's 50 m small bore rifle three positions – pairs event at the 1994 Commonwealth Games and the gold medal in the 50 m rifle prone event at the 2016 South Asian Games.

== Biography ==
Kuheli Gangulee was born 4 September 1970 in Calcutta. She started practising sports shooting at the age of nine, and started competing in professional events in 1986.

Gangulee won the bronze medal in the women's 50 m small bore rifle three positions – pairs event at the 1994 Commonwealth Games in Victoria, British Columbia, partnering Roopa Unnikrishnan. She competed at the 1994 Asian Games in Hiroshima, finishing 18th in the women's 50 m rifle three positions, 22nd in the women's 50 m rifle prone and 28th in the women's 10 m air rifle. She also competed at the 1998 Asian Games in Bangkok and the 2002 Asian Games in Busan in the 50 m rifle events. She has also competed in multiple ISSF World Championships and ISSF World Cup events.

At the 2016 South Asian Games in Guwahati, Gangulee won the women's 50 m rifle prone individual event. She also won the gold medal in the team event, partnering with Lajja Gauswami and Anuja Jung. In December 2016, she won the women's 50 m rifle prone title at the 60th National Shooting Championship Competitions in Pune, representing the Central Industrial Security Force. She scored 626.5 points to finish ahead of Tejaswini Sawant and Lajja Gauswami.

Gangulee also worked as a shooting coach, and coached Indian rifle shooter Tejaswini Sawant.
