= Phillip Christou =

Australian weightlifter (born 1970)

Personal information
- Full name: Phillip Christou
- Born: 18 June 1970 (age 56) Williamstown, Victoria, Australia
- Height: 165 cm (5 ft 5 in)
- Weight: 89.33 kg (196.9 lb)

Sport
- Country: Australia
- Sport: Weightlifting
- Weight class: 94 kg
- Team: National team
- Coached by: Michael Noonan
- Retired: 2006
Medal record
Representing Australia
Men's weightlifting
Commonwealth Games
Bronze medal – third place	1994 Victoria	Snatch
- Updated on 4 October 2016

Phillip Christou (born 18 June 1970 in Williamstown, Victoria) is an Australian male weightlifter, competing in the 94 kg category and representing Australia at international competitions.

== Career ==
As a junior, coached by Michael Noonan, he won the silver medal at the national championships in 1984. Christou won the bronze medal in the snatch at the 1994 Commonwealth Games in Victoria, Canada. lifting 152.5 kg. He competed at world championships, most recently at the 1998 World Weightlifting Championships.

== Personal life ==
Christou has had two children.

== Major competitions ==
Year	Venue	Weight	Snatch (kg)				Clean & Jerk (kg)				Total	Rank
Year	Venue	Weight	1	2	3	Rank	1	2	3	Rank	Total	Rank
World Championships
1998	Lahti, Finland	94 kg	135	~~140~~	140	24	170	~~175~~	175	22	315	21
