= Mojisola Oluwa =

Nigerian weightlifter

Personal information
- Nationality: Nigerian
- Born: 27 March 1973 (age 53)
- Weight: 69 kg (152 lb)

Sport
- Sport: Weightlifting
- Event: 70 kg
Medal record
Representing Nigeria
Men's weightlifting
Commonwealth Games
Gold medal – first place	1994 Victoria	70 kg
African Games
Silver medal – second place	1995 Harare	70 kg
- Updated on 19 September 2019

Mojisola Oluwa (born 27 March 1973 is a Nigerian weightlifter. He competed at the 1996 Summer Olympics in the men's 70 kg event He won the men's 70 kg event at the 1994 Commonwealth Games

== Major results ==
Year	Venue	Weight	Snatch (kg)					Clean & Jerk (kg)					Total	Rank
Year	Venue	Weight	1	2	3	Result	Rank	1	2	3	Result	Rank	Total	Rank
Representing Nigeria
Olympic Games
1996	Atlanta, United States	70 kg	135.0	140.0	~~142.5~~	140.0	18	165.0	~~170.0~~	170.0	170.0	19	310.0	18
Commonwealth Games
1994	Victoria, Canada	70 kg	—N/a	—N/a	—N/a	130.0	3rd place, bronze medalist(s)	—N/a	—N/a	—N/a	165.0	1st place, gold medalist(s)	295.0	1st place, gold medalist(s)
African Games
1995	Harare, Zimbabwe	70 kg	—N/a	—N/a	—N/a	135.0	3rd place, bronze medalist(s)	—N/a	—N/a	—N/a	170.0	2nd place, silver medalist(s)	305.0	2nd place, silver medalist(s)
