= Renos Doweiya =

Nauruan weightlifter

Jalon Renos Doweiya (born 16 November 1983) is a Nauruan weightlifter.

At the Commonwealth Games in Manchester in 2002 he finished third in the 77 kg weight class. However, this was later upgraded to a silver medal after Indian Satheesha Rai was disqualified due to doping. He also won gold medals at the Oceania Games, in both 2001 and 2002.
