= Scott McCarthy =

Canadian weightlifter

Personal information
- Full name: Scott McCarthy
- Born: 7 March 1972 (age 54)
- Weight: 76.50 kg (168.7 lb)

Sport
- Country: Canada
- Sport: Weightlifting
- Weight class: 77 kg
- Team: National team
- Updated on 2 October 2016

Scott McCarthy (born 7 March 1972) is a Canadian male weightlifter, competing in the 77 kg category and representing Canada at international competitions. He competed at world championships, most recently at the 1999 World Weightlifting Championships.

== Major results ==
Year	Venue	Weight	Snatch (kg)				Clean & Jerk (kg)				Total	Rank
Year	Venue	Weight	1	2	3	Rank	1	2	3	Rank	Total	Rank
World Championships
1999	Piraeus, Greece	77 kg	130	~~135~~	135	40	160	165	~~167.5~~	40	300	39
1998	Lahti, Finland	77 kg	~~127.5~~	127.5	132.5	21	157.5	162.5	~~165~~	20	295	18
