= Stephen Ward (weightlifter) =

English weightlifter

Personal information
- Nationality: English
- Born: 4 May 1973 (age 53)
Medal record
Weightlifting
Representing England
Commonwealth Games
Silver medal – second place	(x3) 1994 Victoria	83kg division
Gold medal – first place	1998 Kuala Lumpur	85kg snatch
Silver medal – second place	(x2) 1998 Kuala Lumpur	85kg division

Stephen Ward (born 1973), is a male former weightlifter who competed for England.

== Weightlifting career ==
Ward represented England and won three silver medals in the 83 kg division, at the 1994 Commonwealth Games in Victoria. The three medals were won during an unusual period when three medals were awarded in one category (clean and jerk, snatch and combined) which invariably led to the same athlete winning all three of the same colour medal. Four years later he won a snatch gold medal and two silver medals for England, at the 1998 Commonwealth Games in Kuala Lumpur, Malaysia and he also competed at the 2002 Commonwealth Games.

Ward also competed at the world championships, most recently at the 2001 World Weightlifting Championships.
