= Abha Dhillan =

Indian sports shooter (born 1953)

Personal information
- Nationality: Indian
- Born: 28 December 1953 (age 71)

Sport
- Sport: Sports shooting

Abha Dhillan (born 28 December 1953) is an Indian sports shooter. She competed in the women's 10 metre air pistol event at the 1992 Summer Olympics.
