= Stewart Cruickshank =

English weightlifter (born 1970)

Personal information
- Nationality: English
- Born: 15 June 1970 (age 56) Lambeth, London
Medal record
Weightlifting
Representing England
Commonwealth Games
Silver medal – second place	1994 Victoria	70kg snatch
Bronze medal – third place	(x2) 1994 Victoria	70kg combined/Clean & jerk
Silver medal – second place	1998 Kuala Lumpur	69kg snatch
Bronze medal – third place	2002 Manchester	69kg combined

Stewart Dawson Cruickshank (born 1970), is a male former weightlifter who competed for England. Fitness consultant and personal trainer at Bisham Abbey National Sports Centre, director and founder at Zalva Studio.

== Weightlifting career ==
Cruickshank represented England and won a silver medal and two bronze medals in the 70 kg division, at the 1994 Commonwealth Games in Victoria. Four years later he won a snatch silver medal for England, at the 1998 Commonwealth Games in Kuala Lumpur, Malaysia and in 2002 he won a bronze medal in the combined at the 2002 Commonwealth Games.
