= Damian Brown =

Australian weightlifter (born 1970)

Personal information
- Born: 20 March 1970 (age 56)
- Height: 150 cm (4 ft 11 in)
- Weight: 77 kg (170 lb)
Medal record
Weightlifting
Representing Australia
Commonwealth Games
Gold medal – first place	1994 Victoria	76 kg C&J
Gold medal – first place	1998 Kuala Lumpur	77 kg C&J
Gold medal – first place	1998 Kuala Lumpur	77 kg Combined
Gold medal – first place	2002 Manchester	77 kg Snatch
Silver medal – second place	1994 Victoria	76 kg Combined
Bronze medal – third place	1990 Auckland	75 kg C&J
Bronze medal – third place	1994 Victoria	76 kg Snatch
Bronze medal – third place	1998 Kuala Lumpur	77 kg Snatch

Damian Gerard Brown (born 20 March 1970 in Adelaide) is an Australian weightlifter who competed at three Olympic Games and four Commonwealth Games.

He competed at the 1992 Barcelona, 1996 Atlanta and 2000 Sydney Olympics in the middleweight class. His best result was fourteenth in 2000.

At the Commonwealth Games, Brown won four gold medals, a silver medal and three bronze medals between 1990 and 2002. He was Australia's flag bearer during the opening ceremony for the 2002 Commonwealth Games in Manchester.

He was an ambassador for Australia Day in the local area.
