= Craig Blythman =

Australian weightlifter (born 1970)

Personal information
- Full name: Craig Blythman
- Born: 1 August 1970 (age 55)
- Weight: 76.82 kg (169.4 lb)

Sport
- Country: Australia
- Sport: Weightlifting
- Weight class: 77 kg
- Team: National team
Medal record
Commonwealth Games
Bronze medal – third place	2002 Manchester	77 kg snatch

Craig Blythman (born 1 August 1970) is an Australian male weightlifter, competing in the 77 kg category and representing Australia at international competitions. He competed at world championships, most recently at the 1999 World Weightlifting Championships.

== Major results ==
Year	Venue	Weight	Snatch (kg)				Clean & Jerk (kg)				Total	Rank
Year	Venue	Weight	1	2	3	Rank	1	2	3	Rank	Total	Rank
World Championships
1999	Piraeus, Greece	77 kg	~~132.5~~	132.5	~~137.5~~	43	160	165	---	44	297.5	41
