= David Matam =

French weightlifter

Personal information
- Nationality: French
- Born: 5 June 1975 (age 50); Yaoundé, Cameroon

Sport
- Sport: Weightlifting

David Matam (born 5 June 1975) is a French-Cameroonian weightlifter. He competed in the men's light heavyweight event at the 2004 Summer Olympics.
