= Leon Griffin =

British weightlifter (born 1975)

Personal information
- Nationality: United Kingdom
- Born: 9 July 1975 (age 50) Ipswich, Suffolk
- Weight: 84.86 kg (187.1 lb)

Sport
- Country: Great Britain; England
- Sport: Weightlifting
- Weight class: 85 kg
Medal record
Weightlifting
Representing England
Commonwealth Games
| Gold medal – first place | 1998 Kuala Lumpur | 85kg combined |
| Gold medal – first place | 1998 Kuala Lumpur | 85kg clean & jerk |
| Silver medal – second place | 1998 Kuala Lumpur | 85kg snatch |

Leon Thomas Griffin (born 9 July 1975) is a British male former weightlifter, competing in the 85 kg category and representing Great Britain and England at international competitions.

== Weightlifting career ==
Griffin competed at world championships, most recently at the 1999 World Weightlifting Championships.

He represented England in the 70 kg category, at the 1994 Commonwealth Games in Victoria, Canada. Four years later he represented the England team again and won three medals after stepping up in weight to 85 kg, at the 1998 Commonwealth Games in Kuala Lumpur, Malaysia.

== Major results ==
| Year | Venue | Weight | Snatch (kg) | | | | Clean & Jerk (kg) | | | | Total | Rank |
| Year | Venue | Weight | 1 | 2 | 3 | Rank | 1 | 2 | 3 | Rank | Total | Rank |
World Championships
| 1999 | Piraeus, Greece | 85 kg | 142.5 | ~~147.5~~ | ~~147.5~~ | 46 | 185 | ~~190~~ | ~~190~~ | 37 | 327.5 | 41 |
| 1998 | Lahti, Finland | 85 kg | 145 | ~~150~~ | 150 | 18 | 185 | 190 | 195 | 9 | 345 | 10 |

== See also ==
British records in Olympic weightlifting
