= Roopa Unnikrishnan =

Indian sport shooter

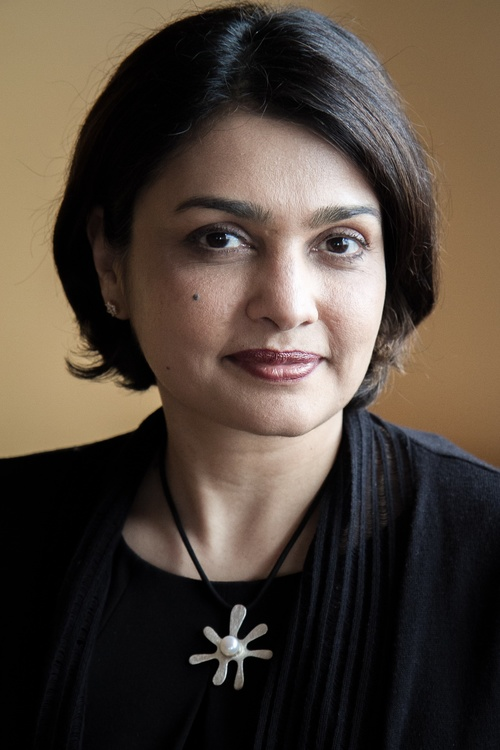
- Unnikrishnan in March 2013

Personal information
- Nationality: American
- Education: Women's Christian College, Ethiraj College, University of Oxford

Sport
- Country: India
- Sport: Sports shooting
Medal record
Women's shooting
Representing India
Commonwealth Games
Gold medal – first place	1998 Kuala Lumpur	50 m rifle prone
Silver medal – second place	1994 Victoria	Small Bore Rifle, Three Positions
Bronze medal – third place	1994 Victoria	Small Bore Rifle, Three Positions – Pairs

Roopa Unnikrishnan is an Indian-born American sports shooter and innovation consultant, based in New York City. She serves as the Senior Vice President of Strategy and Corporate Development of IDEX Corporation. In 1998, she was the first Indian woman to ever win a gold medal at the Commonwealth Games, in the 50m rifle prone position event.

== Biography ==
Unnikrishnan won the Arjuna Award, India's highest sporting prize (equivalent to sports hall of fame) presented by India's president in 1999. The award recognized her multiple global medals, including gold medal and record in the XVI Commonwealth Games, Kuala Lumpur, Malaysia, 1998, in women's prone sports rifle; Silver medal at the World Shooting Grand Prix, Ft. Benning, Georgia, 1998; hold several records at the South Asian level.

She has been a strong advocate for increased support for athletes in India, where they continue to be resource constrained.

Though Shooting is a "Half Blue" sport at Oxford, Unnikrishnan was awarded an Extraordinary Full Blue, since she had won the Commonwealth medal, helped the Oxford team win in university leagues, and was the Captain of the Oxford Women's Shooting Team.

In 1995, she won a Rhodes Scholarship from India.

She got her B.A. at Women's Christian College, Chennai; an M.A. at Ethiraj College, Chennai; an M.A. in Economic History at Balliol in Oxford; and an M.B.A from the Said School of Business in Oxford.

She was the Head of Strategy at Harman International in New York City and in 2022, joined IDEX Corporation as the Senior Vice President of Strategy and Corporate Development.

She has contributed to The Economic Times and to Knowledge@Wharton.

In 2017, she published the book, The Career Catapult: Shake-up the Status Quo and Boost Your Professional Trajectory.

== Personal life ==
Unnikrishnan was born to Indian Malayali Nair parents from Kannur, Kerala, India. became a US Citizen in 2013. She is married to Sreenath Sreenivasan, former Chief Digital Officer at the Metropolitan Museum of Art. She is the daughter of K V Unnikrishnan, a 1962 batch IPS officer from Tamil Nadu who was caught spying for the US when he was in charge of R&AW in south India. While previously posted in Colombo, Sri Lanka, Unnikrishnan was targeted in a honey trap operation involving an air hostess. He was dismissed from service, confessed to high treason, and was sent to Tihar Jail.

== See also ==
- Indians in the New York City metropolitan area
