= Ayhan Çiçek =

Turkish weightlifter

Personal information
- Nationality: Turkish
- Born: 10 January 1978 (age 47)

Sport
- Sport: Weightlifting

Ayhan Çiçek (born 10 January 1978) is a Turkish weightlifter. He competed in the men's middleweight event at the 2000 Summer Olympics.
