= Arsen Melikyan =

Armenian weightlifter (born 1976)

Personal information
- Born: 17 May 1976 (age 50) Yerevan, Armenian SSR, Soviet Union
Medal record
Men's Weightlifting
Representing Armenia
Olympic Games
Bronze medal – third place	2000 Sydney	77 kg
European Championships
Bronze medal – third place	2005 Sofia	85 kg

Arsen Melikyan (Armenian: Արսեն Մելիքյան, born 17 May 1976) is an Armenian weightlifter.

Melikyan won an Olympic bronze medal at the 2000 Summer Olympics by snatching 167.5kg with a 197.5kg clean and jerk (365kg total). He became the first Olympian from the independent Republic of Armenia to win an Olympic bronze medal for weightlifting, a first for the country. Melikyan later won a bronze medal at the 2005 European Weightlifting Championships.
