= Badr Salem Nayef =

Qatari weightlifter (born 1972)

Personal information
- Born: October 29, 1972 (age 54) Bulgaria
Medal record
Men's Weightlifting
Representing Bulgaria
World Championships
Silver medal – second place	1998 Lahti	77 kg
European Championships
Gold medal – first place	1999 A Coruña	77 kg
Representing Qatar
World Championships
Gold medal – first place	1999 Athens	77 kg
Asian Championships
Bronze medal – third place	2000 Osaka	77 kg

Badr Salem Nayef (born Petar Tanev, Bulgarian: Петър Танев, October 29, 1972) is a Qatari weightlifter. He is the 1999 world champion.

One of eight Bulgarian weightlifters recruited by the Qatar Olympic Committee for $1,000,000, Badr Salem Nayef became a Qatari citizen to represent the country. His old name, Petar Tanev, was left behind in the process. Qatar has been known for recruiting sportspeople from other countries, the most notable examples being fellow weightlifter Said Saif Asaad (formerly Angel Popov of Bulgaria) and world-class runner Saif Saaeed Shaheen.
