= Anthony Arthur (weightlifter) =

British weightlifter

Personal information
- Full name: Anthony Arthur
- Nationality: United Kingdom
- Born: 2 March 1973 (age 53) Manchester, United Kingdom
- Height: 175 cm (5 ft 9 in)
- Weight: 83.98 kg (185.1 lb)

Sport
- Country: Great Britain; England
- Sport: Weightlifting
- Weight class: 85 kg
- Team: National team
Medal record
Weightlifting
Representing England
Commonwealth Games
Silver medal – second place	1998 Kuala Lumpur	94kg snatch
Silver medal – second place	2002 Manchester	85kg combined
Silver medal – second place	2002 Manchester	85kg snatch
Bronze medal – third place	2002 Manchester	85kg clean & jerk

Anthony Arthur (born 2 March 1973 in Manchester) is a retired British male weightlifter, competing in the 85 kg category and representing Great Britain and England at international competitions.

== Weightlifting career ==
He participated at the 1996 Summer Olympics in the 83 kg event. He competed at world championships, most recently at the 2001 World Weightlifting Championships. He represented England at the 1998 Commonwealth Games in Kuala Lumpur, Malaysia, where he won a bronze medal in the 94 kg snatch category. Four years later he competed at the 2002 Commonwealth Games in the 85 kg division and won two silver medals in the combined and snatch and a bronze medal in the clean and jerk.

== Major results ==
Year	Venue	Weight	Snatch (kg)				Clean & Jerk (kg)				Total	Rank
Year	Venue	Weight	1	2	3	Rank	1	2	3	Rank	Total	Rank
Summer Olympics
1996	Atlanta, United States	83 kg	140	147.5	~~152.5~~	N/A	170	180	~~187.5~~	N/A	327.5	12
World Championships
2001	Antalya, Turkey	85 kg	135	140	~~142.5~~	17	165	~~170~~	170	17	310	15
1999	Piraeus, Greece	94 kg	150	155	---	31	155	---	---	52	310	41
