= Badathala Adisekhar =

Indian weightlifter (born 1964)

Personal information
- Nationality: Indian
- Born: 14 April 1964 (age 61)

Sport
- Sport: Weightlifting

Badathala Adisekhar (born 14 April 1964) is an Indian weightlifter. He competed in the 1992 and 1996 Summer Olympics.
