= Oscar Chaplin III =

American weightlifter (1980–2022)

Personal information
- Born: February 22, 1980 Savannah, Georgia, U.S.
- Died: February 4, 2022 (aged 41) Savannah, Georgia, U.S.
Medal record
Men's Weightlifting
Representing the United States
Junior World Championship
Gold medal – first place	2000 Prague	– 77 kg
Bronze medal – third place	1999 Savannah	– 77 kg
Pan American Games
Bronze medal – third place	1999 Winnipeg	– 77 kg

Chaplin at the 2000 Summer Olympics

Oscar Chaplin III (February 22, 1980 – February 4, 2022) was an American Olympic weightlifter.

Chaplin III represented United States in weightlifting in the 1990s and 2000s. He competed at 77 and 85 kilograms. He won the 2000 Junior World Championships at 77 kilograms with a 155-kilogram snatch and 187.5-kilogram clean & jerk for a total of 342.5 kilograms. Chaplin was the only American man to win a world-level event for 16 years (Clarence "CJ" Cummings won 2016 Junior Worlds).

In 1999, Chaplin set the American snatch record at 77 kilograms with a 157.5-kilogram lift. In 2002, he set the 85-kilogram snatch record with a 166-kilogram lift. Both of those American records stood from when he set them until the International Weightlifting Federation (IWF) re-organized the bodyweight categories in 2018.

He died in Savannah, Georgia on February 4, 2022, at the age of 41.

== Weightlifting achievements ==
- Junior World Champion (2000)
- Olympic team member (2000 & 2004)
- Multiple All-Time Junior and Senior American record holder in the snatch, clean and jerk, and total
- Multiple Junior and Senior American record holder in snatch, clean and jerk, and total (1993–1997)
- Attended three IWF Junior World Championships (1998, 1999, 2000)
- Competed in four IWF Senior World Championships (1998, 1999, 2002, 2003)
