= Sandeep Kumar (weightlifter) =

Indian weightlifter (born 1975)

Personal information
- Nationality: Indian
- Born: 27 February 1975 (age 51)

Sport
- Sport: Weightlifting

Sandeep Kumar (born 27 February 1975) is an Indian weightlifter. He competed in the men's featherweight event at the 1996 Summer Olympics. He has won bronze medal at Commonwealth Games 1998 held at Kuala Lumpur (Malaysia).
