= Satheesha Rai =

Indian weightlifter (born 1971)

Satheesha Rai (born 27 August 1971) is an Indian weightlifter and Olympian from Mangalore, Karnataka. He is also a recipient of the Arjuna Award given in 1999. He won a gold medal and two silver medals in the 1998 Commonwealth Games. He also won two gold medals and a bronze medal in 2002 Commonwealth Games but the medal he won in 2002 was stripped because he tested positive for taking a banned substance. Rai pleaded innocence and stated, "I have participated in over 16 International events including the Olympics and the World championships the Asian Games, the Commonwealth Games besides a host of Asian Weightlifting championships and SAF Games. And in all these Games too tests are mandatory and I have come through clean. Also just before the teams left for Manchester, Sports Authority of India (SAI) conducted tests thrice and unless it's negative we are informed, but was subsequently served a life ban.
