= 1997 World Weightlifting Championships – Men's 83 kg =

The 1997 World Weightlifting Championships were held in Chiang Mai, Thailand from December 6 to December 14. The men's competition in the 83 kg division was staged on 11 December 1997.

== Medalists ==
Event	Gold		Silver		Bronze	
Snatch	Andrzej Cofalik (POL)	172.5 kg	Yury Myshkovets (RUS)	172.5 kg	Dursun Sevinç (TUR)	170.0 kg
Clean & Jerk	Zhang Yong (CHN)	207.5 kg	Krzysztof Siemion (POL)	207.5 kg	Andrzej Cofalik (POL)	207.5 kg
Total	Andrzej Cofalik (POL)	380.0 kg	Dursun Sevinç (TUR)	375.0 kg	Krzysztof Siemion (POL)	372.5 kg

== Records ==
Prior to this competition, the existing world records were as follows.

World record	Snatch	Pyrros Dimas (GRE)	180.0 kg	Atlanta, United States	26 July 1996
World record	Clean & Jerk	Zhang Yong (CHN)	214.0 kg	Yangzhou, China	12 July 1997
World record	Total	Pyrros Dimas (GRE)	392.5 kg	Atlanta, United States	26 July 1996

== Results ==
Rank	Athlete	Body weight	Snatch (kg)				Clean & Jerk (kg)				Total
Rank	Athlete	Body weight	1	2	3	Rank	1	2	3	Rank	Total
1st place, gold medalist(s)	Andrzej Cofalik (POL)	82.55	165.0	170.0	172.5	1st place, gold medalist(s)	200.0	205.0	207.5	3rd place, bronze medalist(s)	380.0
2nd place, silver medalist(s)	Dursun Sevinç (TUR)	82.75	165.0	~~170.0~~	170.0	3rd place, bronze medalist(s)	200.0	~~205.0~~	205.0	4	375.0
3rd place, bronze medalist(s)	Krzysztof Siemion (POL)	82.40	160.0	~~165.0~~	165.0	5	197.5	207.5	~~210.0~~	2nd place, silver medalist(s)	372.5
4	Yury Myshkovets (RUS)	82.65	167.5	172.5	~~177.5~~	2nd place, silver medalist(s)	~~195.0~~	195.0	200.0	5	372.5
5	Valeri Pokryvchak (UKR)	82.80	147.5	~~152.5~~	~~152.5~~	10	180.0	185.0	190.0	6	337.5
6	Diego Facca (ITA)	82.95	145.0	~~150.0~~	150.0	8	185.0	~~190.0~~	~~190.0~~	7	335.0
7	Sergio Mannironi (ITA)	80.55	~~150.0~~	150.0	~~155.0~~	7	182.5	~~187.5~~	~~190.0~~	8	332.5
8	Aleksandrs Žerebkovs (LAT)	78.95	150.0	~~155.0~~	155.0	6	170.0	175.0	~~177.5~~	10	330.0
9	Mohamed Mousa (EGY)	82.15	~~147.5~~	~~147.5~~	147.5	9	175.0	180.0	~~185.0~~	9	327.5
10	James Swann (NZL)	83.00	132.5	137.5	~~142.5~~	11	165.0	172.5	~~180.0~~	12	310.0
11	Daniel Bango (CZE)	82.85	130.0	~~135.0~~	—	13	170.0	~~175.0~~	175.0	11	305.0
12	Chiu Yen-chun (TPE)	82.85	130.0	~~137.5~~	~~137.5~~	14	170.0	~~175.0~~	~~180.0~~	15	300.0
13	Anuchit Saengsiriat (THA)	81.95	125.0	~~130.0~~	~~130.0~~	16	~~170.0~~	170.0	~~175.0~~	14	295.0
14	Jason MacLean (CAN)	82.20	~~130.0~~	130.0	~~135.0~~	12	~~160.0~~	160.0	~~165.0~~	17	290.0
15	Stephen Haldun (AUS)	82.75	122.5	127.5	~~132.5~~	15	~~162.5~~	162.5	~~167.5~~	16	290.0
16	Norvell Busby (NED)	79.30	115.0	~~120.0~~	122.5	17	~~145.0~~	~~145.0~~	145.0	18	267.5
—	Mital Sharipov (KGZ)	81.95	160.0	165.0	~~167.5~~	4	—	—	—	—	—
—	Zhang Yong (CHN)	81.85	~~160.0~~	~~160.0~~	~~160.0~~	—	200.0	205.0	207.5	1st place, gold medalist(s)	—
—	Bakhtiyor Nurullaev (UZB)	80.70	~~135.0~~	~~135.0~~	~~135.0~~	—	170.0	~~175.0~~	—	13	—
—	Vyacheslav Nyu (KAZ)	82.10	~~162.5~~	~~162.5~~	~~162.5~~	—	—	—	—	—	—
—	Ibragim Samadov (KAZ)	82.45	~~155.0~~	~~155.0~~	—	—	—	—	—	—	—
