= List of Greek records in Olympic weightlifting =

The following are the national records in Olympic weightlifting in Greece. Records are maintained in each weight class for the snatch lift, clean and jerk lift, and the total for both lifts by the Hellenic Weightlifting Federation (Ελληνική Ομοσπονδία Άρσης Βαρών).

== Current records ==
=== Men ===
Event	Record	Athlete	Date	Meet	Place	Ref
60 kg
Snatch	106 kg	Standard				
Clean & Jerk	129 kg	Standard				
Total	230 kg	Standard				
65 kg
Snatch	124 kg	Konstantinos Lampridis	13 October 2026	European U23 Championships	Durrës, Albania	
Clean & Jerk	155 kg	Konstantinos Lampridis	29 October 2025	European Junior Championships	Durrës, Albania	
Total	275 kg	Konstantinos Lampridis	29 October 2025	European Junior Championships	Durrës, Albania	
70 kg
Snatch	115 kg	Standard				
Clean & Jerk	140 kg	Standard				
Total	252 kg	Standard				
75 kg
Snatch	126 kg	Panagiotis Spyrou	14 October 2026	European Junior Championships	Durrës, Albania	
Clean & Jerk	148 kg	Panagiotis Spyrou	14 October 2026	European Junior Championships	Durrës, Albania	
Total	274 kg	Panagiotis Spyrou	14 October 2026	European Junior Championships	Durrës, Albania	
85 kg
Snatch	136 kg	Georgios Dimas	16 October 2026	European Junior Championships	Durrës, Albania	
Clean & Jerk	154 kg	Standard				
Total	288 kg	Georgios Dimas	16 October 2026	European Junior Championships	Durrës, Albania	
95 kg
Snatch	136 kg	Standard				
Clean & Jerk	165 kg	Standard				
Total	296 kg	Standard				
110 kg
Snatch	146 kg	Standard				
Clean & Jerk	178 kg	Standard				
Total	320 kg	Standard				
+110 kg
Snatch	168 kg	Ioannis Athanasiou	25 April 2026	European Championships	Batumi, Georgia	
Clean & Jerk	198 kg	Ioannis Athanasiou	25 April 2026	European Championships	Batumi, Georgia	
Total	366 kg	Ioannis Athanasiou	25 April 2026	European Championships	Batumi, Georgia	

=== Women ===
Event	Record	Athlete	Date	Meet	Place	Ref
49 kg
Snatch	70 kg	Standard				
Clean & Jerk	90 kg	Standard				
Total	158 kg	Standard				
53 kg
Snatch	86 kg	Maria Stratoudaki	2 May 2026	World Junior Championships	Ismailia, Egypt	
Clean & Jerk	105 kg	Maria Stratoudaki	19 April 2026	European Championships	Batumi, Georgia	
Total	190 kg	Maria Stratoudaki	12 October 2026	European Junior Championships	Durrës, Albania	
Total	191 kg	Maria Stratoudaki	29 October 2026	World Championships	Ningbo, China	
57 kg
Snatch	76 kg	Standard				
Clean & Jerk	98 kg	Standard				
Total	173 kg	Standard				
61 kg
Snatch	86 kg	Maria Kardara	31 August 2026	Mediterranean Games	San Giorgio Ionico, Italy	
Clean & Jerk	107 kg	Maria Kardara	31 August 2026	Mediterranean Games	San Giorgio Ionico, Italy	
Total	191 kg	Maria Kardara	31 August 2026	Mediterranean Games	San Giorgio Ionico, Italy	
69 kg
Snatch	99 kg	Despoina Polaktsidou	1 September 2026	Mediterranean Games	San Giorgio Ionico, Italy	
Clean & Jerk	128 kg	Despoina Polaktsidou	1 September 2026	Mediterranean Games	San Giorgio Ionico, Italy	
Total	227 kg	Despoina Polaktsidou	1 September 2026	Mediterranean Games	San Giorgio Ionico, Italy	
77 kg
Snatch	91 kg	Standard				
Clean & Jerk	115 kg	Standard				
Total	205 kg	Standard				
86 kg
Snatch	97 kg	Standard				
Clean & Jerk	121 kg	Standard				
Total	217 kg	Standard				
+86 kg
Snatch	108 kg	Standard				
Clean & Jerk	136 kg	Standard				
Total	244 kg	Standard				

== Historical records ==
=== Men (2025–2026) ===
71 kg
Snatch	127 kg	Panagiotis Spyrou	8 July 2026	Youth World Championships	Cali, Colombia
Clean & Jerk	150 kg	Panagiotis Spyrou	3 April 2026	Greek Junior Championships	Panorama, Greece
Total	275 kg	Panagiotis Spyrou	3 April 2026	Greek Junior Championships	Panorama, Greece
79 kg
Snatch	124 kg	Standard			
Clean & Jerk	151 kg	Standard			
Total	271 kg	Standard			
88 kg
Snatch	131 kg	Standard			
Clean & Jerk	160 kg	Standard			
Total	287 kg	Standard			
94 kg
Snatch	136 kg	Standard			
Clean & Jerk	166 kg	Standard			
Total	297 kg	Standard			

=== Men (2018–2025) ===
Event	Record	Athlete	Date	Meet	Place	Ref
55 kg
Snatch	115 kg	Standard				
Clean & Jerk	137 kg	Standard				
Total	250 kg	Standard				
61 kg
Snatch	122 kg	Standard				
Clean & Jerk	147 kg	Standard				
Total	265 kg	Standard				
67 kg
Snatch	130 kg	Standard				
Clean & Jerk	156 kg	Standard				
Total	281 kg	Standard				
73 kg
Snatch	136 kg	Standard				
Clean & Jerk	165 kg	Standard				
Total	296 kg	Standard				
81 kg
Snatch	146 kg	Angelos Kanavas	6 December 2024	Greek Championships	Marousi, Greece	
Clean & Jerk	175 kg	Standard				
Total	314 kg	Angelos Kanavas	6 December 2024	Greek Championships	Marousi, Greece	
89 kg
Snatch	161 kg	Theodoros Iakovidis	4 October 2019	Mediterranean Cup	Serravalle, San Marino	
Clean & Jerk	195 kg	Theodoros Iakovidis	29 January 2020	World Cup	Rome, Italy	
Total	354 kg	Theodoros Iakovidis	29 January 2020	World Cup	Rome, Italy	
96 kg
Snatch	165 kg	Gerasimos Galiatsatos	31 July 2021	Greek Junior Championships	Aridaia, Greece	
Clean & Jerk	200 kg	Georgios Markoulas	12 April 2019	European Championships	Batumi, Georgia	
Total	360 kg	Theodoros Iakovidis	12 April 2019	European Championships	Batumi, Georgia	
102 kg
Snatch	170 kg	Gerasimos Galiatsatos	28 November 2021	Greek Championships	Loutraki, Greece	
Clean & Jerk	197 kg	Georgios Markoulas	21 April 2019	Greek Championships	Ioannina, Greece	
Total	354 kg	Georgios Markoulas	21 April 2019	Greek Championships	Ioannina, Greece	
109 kg
Snatch	168 kg	Stathis Strubis	21 April 2019	Greek Championships	Ioannina, Greece	
Clean & Jerk	208 kg	Stathis Strubis	24 November 2018	Greek Championships	Pylaia, Greece	
Total	368 kg	Stathis Strubis	24 November 2018	Greek Championships	Pylaia, Greece	
+109 kg
Snatch	179 kg	Standard				
Clean & Jerk	213 kg	Standard				
Total	385 kg	Standard				

=== Men (1998–2018) ===
Event	Record	Athlete	Date	Meet	Place	Ref
–56 kg
Snatch	112 kg	Arthouros Akritidis	7 December 2007	Greek Championships	Patras, Greece	
Clean & Jerk	142 kg	Arthouros Akritidis	17 September 2007	World Championships	Chiang Mai, Thailand	
Total	254 kg	Arthouros Akritidis	7 December 2007	Greek Championships	Patras, Greece	
–62 kg
Snatch	147 kg	Leonidas Sabanis	10 November 1998	World Championships	Lahti, Finland	
Clean & Jerk	172 kg	Leonidas Sabanis	10 November 1998	World Championships	Lahti, Finland	
Total	320 kg	Leonidas Sabanis	10 November 1998	World Championships	Lahti, Finland	
–69 kg
Snatch	155 kg	Georgios Tzelilis	11 November 1998	World Championships	Lahti, Finland	
Clean & Jerk	190 kg	Valerios Leonidis	14 April 1999	European Championships	A Coruña, Spain	
Total	345 kg	Georgios Tzelilis	11 November 1998	World Championships	Lahti, Finland	
–77 kg
Snatch	165 kg	Viktor Mitrou	24 November 1999	World Championships	Athens, Greece	
Clean & Jerk	205 kg	Viktor Mitrou	24 November 1999	World Championships	Athens, Greece	
Total	370 kg	Viktor Mitrou	24 November 1999	World Championships	Athens, Greece	
–85 kg
Snatch	180 kg	Pyrros Dimas	24 November 1999	World Championships	Athens, Greece	
Clean & Jerk	215 kg	Pyrros Dimas	23 September 2000	Olympic Games	Sydney, Australia	
Total	390 kg	Pyrros Dimas	23 September 2000	Olympic Games	Sydney, Australia	
–94 kg
Snatch	188 kg	Akakios Kakiasvilis	27 November 1999	World Championships	Athens, Greece	
Clean & Jerk	225 kg	Akakios Kakiasvilis	27 November 1999	World Championships	Athens, Greece	
Total	412 kg	Akakios Kakiasvilis	27 November 1999	World Championships	Athens, Greece	
–105 kg
Snatch	179 kg	David Kavelasvili	9 February 2013		Aridaia, Greece	
Clean & Jerk	226 kg	Nikolaos Kourtidis	25 September 2007	World Championships	Chiang Mai, Thailand	
Total	403 kg	Nikolaos Kourtidis	25 September 2007	World Championships	Chiang Mai, Thailand	
+105 kg
Snatch	195 kg	Dimitrios Papageridis	26 September 2007	World Championships	Chiang Mai, Thailand	
Clean & Jerk	232 kg	Oleg Panatidis	27 September 1998	Greek Championships	Nea Peramos, Greece	
Total	426 kg	Dimitrios Papageridis	26 September 2007	World Championships	Chiang Mai, Thailand	

=== Women (2025–2026) ===
Event	Record	Athlete	Date	Meet	Place	Ref
48 kg
Snatch	70 kg	Standard				
Clean & Jerk	89 kg	Standard				
Total	157 kg	Standard				
58 kg
Snatch	89 kg	Maria Kardara	December 2025	Balkan Championships	Durrës, Albania	
Clean & Jerk	107 kg	Maria Kardara	12 December 2025	Greek Championships	Drama, Greece	
Total	195 kg	Maria Kardara	December 2025	Balkan Championships	Durrës, Albania	
63 kg
Snatch	85 kg	Standard				
Clean & Jerk	106 kg	Standard				
Total	195 kg	Standard				

=== Women (2018–2025) ===
Event	Record	Athlete	Date	Meet	Place	Ref
45 kg
Snatch	72 kg	Standard				
Clean & Jerk	92 kg	Standard				
Total	162 kg	Standard				
49 kg
Snatch	77 kg	Standard				
Clean & Jerk	98 kg	Standard				
Total	173 kg	Standard				
55 kg
Snatch	84 kg	Standard				
Clean & Jerk	105 kg	Standard				
Total	188 kg	Standard				
59 kg
Snatch	96 kg	Sofia Georgopoulou	12 March 2022		Athens, Greece	
Clean & Jerk	116 kg	Konstantina Benteli	4 October 2019	Mediterranean Cup	Serravalle, San Marino	
Total	210 kg	Konstantina Benteli	4 October 2019	Mediterranean Cup	Serravalle, San Marino	
64 kg
Snatch	94 kg	Standard				
Clean & Jerk	117 kg	Standard				
Total	208 kg	Standard				
71 kg
Snatch	99 kg	Standard				
Clean & Jerk	125 kg	Standard				
Total	221 kg	Standard				
76 kg
Snatch	104 kg	Standard				
Clean & Jerk	130 kg	Standard				
Total	231 kg	Standard				
81 kg
Snatch	108 kg	Standard				
Clean & Jerk	134 kg	Standard				
Total	241 kg	Standard				
87 kg
Snatch	112 kg	Standard				
Clean & Jerk	139 kg	Standard				
Total	250 kg	Standard				
+87 kg
Snatch	122 kg	Standard				
Clean & Jerk	150 kg	Standard				
Total	272 kg	Standard				

=== Women (1998–2018) ===
Event	Record	Athlete	Date	Meet	Place	Ref
–48 kg
Snatch	75 kg	Christina Baka	15 November 2003	World Championships	Vancouver, Canada	
Clean & Jerk	92 kg	Christina Baka	15 November 2003	World Championships	Vancouver, Canada	
Total	167 kg	Christina Baka	15 November 2003	World Championships	Vancouver, Canada	
–53 kg
Snatch	82 kg	Christina Baka	13 December 2002	Greek Championships	Athens, Greece	
Clean & Jerk	100 kg	Christina Baka	13 December 2002	Greek Championships	Athens, Greece	
Total	182 kg	Christina Baka	13 December 2002	Greek Championships	Athens, Greece	
–58 kg
Snatch	97 kg	Charikleia Kastritsi	20 November 2002	World Championships	Warsaw, Poland	
Clean & Jerk	112 kg	Charikleia Kastritsi	20 November 2002	World Championships	Warsaw, Poland	
Total	210 kg	Charikleia Kastritsi	20 November 2002	World Championships	Warsaw, Poland	
–63 kg
Snatch	105 kg	Anastasia Tsakiri	25 April 2002	European Championships	Antalya, Turkey	
Clean & Jerk	136 kg	Anastasia Tsakiri	21 November 2002	World Championships	Warsaw, Poland	
Total	240 kg	Anastasia Tsakiri	21 November 2002	World Championships	Warsaw, Poland	
–69 kg
Snatch	97 kg	Eleni Kourtelidou	8 February 2009		Limassol, Cyprus	
Clean & Jerk	130 kg	Maria Tatsi	8 November 2001	World Championships	Antalya, Turkey	
Total	225 kg	Maria Tatsi	8 November 2001	World Championships	Antalya, Turkey	
–75 kg
Snatch	112 kg	Christina Ioannidi	20 August 2004	Olympic Games	Athens, Greece	
Clean & Jerk	142 kg	Christina Ioannidi	20 August 2004	Olympic Games	Athens, Greece	
Total	255 kg	Christina Ioannidi	20 August 2004	Olympic Games	Athens, Greece	
–90 kg
Snatch						
Clean & Jerk						
Total						
+90 kg
Snatch						
Clean & Jerk						
Total						
