= 1999 World Weightlifting Championships – Men's 85 kg =

The Men's Light-Heavyweight Weightlifting Event (85 kg) is the fifth men's weight class event at the weightlifting competition, limited to competitors with a maximum of 85 kilograms of body mass. The competition at the 1999 World Weightlifting Championships took place in Athens, Greece on 26 November 1999.

Each lifter performed in both the snatch and clean and jerk lifts, with the final score being the sum of the lifter's best result in each. The athlete received three attempts in each of the two lifts; the score for the lift was the heaviest weight successfully lifted.

== Medalists ==
| Event | Gold | | Silver | | Bronze | |
|---|---|---|---|---|---|---|
| Snatch | Pyrros Dimas (GRE) | 180.0 kg | Giorgi Asanidze (GEO) | 177.5 kg | Marc Huster (GER) | 177.5 kg |
| Clean & Jerk | Shahin Nassirinia (IRI) | 215.0 kg | Christos Spyrou (GRE) | 207.5 kg | Pyrros Dimas (GRE) | 207.5 kg |
| Total | Shahin Nassirinia (IRI) | 390.0 kg | Pyrros Dimas (GRE) | 387.5 kg | Marc Huster (GER) | 382.5 kg |

== Records ==
Prior to this competition, the existing world records were as follows.

| World Record | Snatch | Georgi Gardev (BUL) | 180.0 kg | A Coruña, Spain | 17 April 1999 |
| World Record | Clean & Jerk | Zhang Yong (CHN) | 218.0 kg | Ramat Gan, Israel | 25 April 1998 |
| World Record | Total | World Standard | 395.0 kg | — | 1 January 1998 |

== Results ==
| Rank | Athlete | Body weight | Snatch (kg) | | | | Clean & Jerk (kg) | | | | Total |
| Rank | Athlete | Body weight | 1 | 2 | 3 | Rank | 1 | 2 | 3 | Rank | Total |
|---|---|---|---|---|---|---|---|---|---|---|---|
| 1st place, gold medalist(s) | Shahin Nassirinia (IRI) | 84.72 | 170.0 | 175.0 | ~~177.5~~ | 4 | 205.0 | 210.0 | 215.0 | 1st place, gold medalist(s) | 390.0 |
| 2nd place, silver medalist(s) | Pyrros Dimas (GRE) | 84.83 | 175.0 | 180.5 | ~~182.5~~ | 1st place, gold medalist(s) | 207.5 | ~~212.5~~ | ~~212.5~~ | 3rd place, bronze medalist(s) | 387.5 |
| 3rd place, bronze medalist(s) | Marc Huster (GER) | 84.43 | ~~172.5~~ | 172.5 | 177.5 | 3rd place, bronze medalist(s) | 205.0 | ~~210.0~~ | ~~210.0~~ | 4 | 382.5 |
| 4 | Christos Spyrou (GRE) | 83.80 | 172.5 | ~~177.5~~ | ~~177.5~~ | 6 | 207.5 | ~~212.5~~ | ~~212.5~~ | 2nd place, silver medalist(s) | 380.0 |
| 5 | Andrzej Cofalik (POL) | 84.77 | 165.0 | 170.0 | 175.0 | 5 | 205.0 | ~~210.0~~ | ~~212.5~~ | 5 | 380.0 |
| 6 | Giorgi Asanidze (GEO) | 83.91 | 170.0 | 175.0 | 177.5 | 2nd place, silver medalist(s) | ~~200.0~~ | 200.0 | ~~207.5~~ | 9 | 377.5 |
| 7 | Georgi Gardev (BUL) | 84.08 | 165.0 | 170.0 | ~~175.0~~ | 7 | 195.0 | 202.5 | ~~207.5~~ | 6 | 372.5 |
| 8 | Ilir Kafarani (ALB) | 84.24 | 160.0 | 165.0 | ~~167.5~~ | 9 | 195.0 | 200.0 | 202.5 | 7 | 367.5 |
| 9 | Gagik Khachatryan (ARM) | 84.80 | ~~160.0~~ | 160.0 | 165.0 | 14 | 190.0 | ~~200.0~~ | 200.0 | 11 | 365.0 |
| 10 | Sergo Chakhoyan (AUS) | 80.66 | 167.5 | ~~172.5~~ | ~~175.0~~ | 8 | 195.0 | ~~200.0~~ | ~~200.0~~ | 13 | 362.5 |
| 11 | Ernesto Quiroga (CUB) | 84.73 | 155.0 | 160.0 | 162.5 | 17 | 200.0 | ~~207.5~~ | ~~207.5~~ | 10 | 362.5 |
| 12 | Nizami Pashayev (AZE) | 84.26 | 157.5 | ~~163.0~~ | ~~163.0~~ | 22 | 192.5 | 197.5 | 203.0 | 8 | 360.0 |
| 13 | Krzysztof Siemion (POL) | 84.08 | 155.0 | 160.0 | 162.5 | 15 | 195.0 | ~~205.0~~ | ~~205.0~~ | 15 | 357.5 |
| 14 | Mital Sharipov (KGZ) | 84.35 | 160.0 | ~~165.0~~ | 165.0 | 10 | 185.0 | ~~192.5~~ | 192.5 | 22 | 357.5 |
| 15 | Bakhyt Akhmetov (KGZ) | 84.47 | 155.0 | 160.0 | 165.0 | 11 | 185.0 | 190.0 | ~~195.0~~ | 25 | 355.0 |
| 16 | Sergio Mannironi (ITA) | 83.29 | ~~155.0~~ | 155.0 | 160.0 | 18 | 185.0 | 190.0 | 192.5 | 20 | 352.5 |
| 17 | Francesco De Tommaso (ITA) | 84.70 | 150.0 | ~~155.0~~ | 155.0 | 26 | 192.5 | 197.5 | ~~200.0~~ | 12 | 352.5 |
| 18 | Andrey Poitschke (GER) | 84.27 | 157.5 | 162.5 | ~~165.0~~ | 16 | 187.5 | ~~192.5~~ | — | 31 | 350.0 |
| 19 | György Ehrlich (HUN) | 84.54 | 157.5 | 165.0 | ~~170.0~~ | 12 | 185.0 | ~~192.5~~ | ~~192.5~~ | 35 | 350.0 |
| 20 | Mohamed Mousa (EGY) | 84.70 | ~~150.0~~ | ~~155.0~~ | 155.0 | 25 | 185.0 | 190.0 | 195.0 | 17 | 350.0 |
| 21 | Valeri Pokryvchak (UKR) | 84.75 | 155.0 | ~~160.0~~ | ~~160.0~~ | 27 | 195.0 | ~~202.5~~ | ~~202.5~~ | 18 | 350.0 |
| 22 | Eduard Tyukin (RUS) | 84.77 | 155.0 | 160.0 | ~~165.0~~ | 19 | 185.0 | 190.0 | ~~195.0~~ | 28 | 350.0 |
| 23 | Joel Mackenzie (CUB) | 84.87 | 155.0 | ~~160.0~~ | 160.0 | 20 | 185.0 | 190.0 | ~~195.0~~ | 30 | 350.0 |
| 24 | Ondrej Kutlík (SVK) | 84.55 | 145.0 | 152.5 | ~~155.0~~ | 31 | ~~195.0~~ | ~~195.0~~ | 195.0 | 16 | 347.5 |
| 25 | Sergejs Pužanovskis (LAT) | 84.80 | 152.5 | ~~157.5~~ | 157.5 | 23 | 182.5 | 187.5 | 190.0 | 29 | 347.5 |
| 26 | Natig Hasanov (AZE) | 84.70 | 152.5 | ~~157.5~~ | ~~157.5~~ | 32 | 187.5 | 192.5 | ~~197.5~~ | 23 | 345.0 |
| 27 | Santiago Martínez (ESP) | 84.76 | 155.0 | ~~160.0~~ | ~~160.0~~ | 28 | 185.0 | ~~190.0~~ | 190.0 | 27 | 345.0 |
| 28 | Kuanysh Rymkulov (KAZ) | 84.94 | 150.0 | 155.0 | 160.0 | 21 | 180.0 | 185.0 | ~~187.5~~ | 38 | 345.0 |
| 29 | Bakhtiyor Nurullaev (UZB) | 83.21 | 150.0 | ~~160.0~~ | ~~160.0~~ | 33 | 185.0 | 190.0 | 192.5 | 19 | 342.5 |
| 30 | Kazumi Suzuki (JPN) | 83.70 | 140.0 | ~~145.0~~ | 147.5 | 40 | 190.0 | ~~195.0~~ | 195.0 | 14 | 342.5 |
| 31 | Sokol Bishanaku (ALB) | 84.51 | ~~152.5~~ | 152.5 | ~~160.0~~ | 30 | 190.0 | ~~195.0~~ | ~~195.0~~ | 26 | 342.5 |
| 32 | Corey Barrett (USA) | 84.92 | 150.0 | 155.0 | ~~157.5~~ | 29 | 180.0 | 185.0 | 187.5 | 32 | 342.5 |
| 33 | Damian Brown (AUS) | 84.32 | 145.0 | 150.0 | ~~152.5~~ | 35 | 180.0 | 185.0 | 190.0 | 24 | 340.0 |
| 34 | Aleksandrs Žerebkovs (LAT) | 83.47 | 150.0 | ~~155.0~~ | 155.0 | 24 | 172.5 | 177.5 | 180.0 | 40 | 335.0 |
| 35 | David Matam (CMR) | 83.86 | 145.0 | 150.0 | ~~157.5~~ | 34 | ~~185.0~~ | 185.0 | ~~192.5~~ | 33 | 335.0 |
| 36 | José Llerena (ECU) | 83.90 | ~~142.5~~ | ~~142.5~~ | 142.5 | 44 | ~~192.5~~ | ~~192.5~~ | 192.5 | 21 | 335.0 |
| 37 | José Juan Navarro (ESP) | 84.83 | 140.0 | 145.0 | 147.5 | 41 | 177.5 | 182.5 | 185.0 | 36 | 332.5 |
| 38 | Ali Oksala (FIN) | 80.18 | 140.0 | 145.0 | 147.5 | 39 | 170.0 | 175.0 | 182.5 | 39 | 330.0 |
| 39 | Toni Puurunen (FIN) | 84.50 | 150.0 | ~~155.0~~ | ~~155.0~~ | 37 | ~~180.0~~ | 180.0 | ~~185.0~~ | 41 | 330.0 |
| 40 | Álvaro Velasco (COL) | 84.53 | ~~150.0~~ | 150.0 | ~~155.0~~ | 38 | 180.0 | ~~185.0~~ | ~~185.0~~ | 42 | 330.0 |
| 41 | Leon Griffin (GBR) | 84.86 | 142.5 | ~~147.5~~ | ~~147.5~~ | 46 | 185.0 | ~~190.0~~ | ~~190.0~~ | 37 | 327.5 |
| 42 | Alexey Chuikov (KAZ) | 84.41 | 150.0 | ~~160.0~~ | ~~160.0~~ | 36 | 170.0 | 175.0 | ~~180.0~~ | 44 | 325.0 |
| 43 | Ofisa Ofisa (SAM) | 84.43 | 140.0 | ~~145.0~~ | ~~145.0~~ | 48 | 180.0 | ~~185.0~~ | 185.0 | 34 | 325.0 |
| 44 | James Swann (NZL) | 84.88 | 140.0 | ~~145.0~~ | 145.0 | 43 | 170.0 | 175.0 | ~~180.0~~ | 45 | 320.0 |
| 45 | Atila Sebescen (CRO) | 84.00 | 137.5 | 142.5 | ~~147.5~~ | 45 | 172.5 | ~~177.5~~ | ~~177.5~~ | 46 | 315.0 |
| 46 | Chiu Yen-chun (TPE) | 84.84 | ~~135.0~~ | ~~135.0~~ | 135.0 | 53 | 175.0 | 180.0 | ~~185.0~~ | 43 | 315.0 |
| 47 | Petr Hruby (CZE) | 81.10 | 140.0 | 145.0 | ~~147.5~~ | 42 | ~~167.5~~ | 167.5 | ~~172.5~~ | 50 | 312.5 |
| 48 | Tim McRae (USA) | 83.48 | 135.0 | 140.0 | ~~150.0~~ | 47 | 160.0 | 170.0 | ~~175.0~~ | 48 | 310.0 |
| 49 | Eric Palissot (SUI) | 84.55 | 127.5 | ~~132.5~~ | 132.5 | 54 | 160.0 | 165.0 | 170.0 | 49 | 302.5 |
| 50 | Jason MacLean (CAN) | 83.99 | ~~135.0~~ | 135.0 | ~~140.0~~ | 51 | 165.0 | ~~170.0~~ | ~~170.0~~ | 53 | 300.0 |
| 51 | Egidijus Remėza (LTU) | 84.12 | 130.0 | 135.0 | ~~137.5~~ | 52 | 160.0 | 165.0 | ~~167.5~~ | 54 | 300.0 |
| 52 | Serge Tremblay (CAN) | 80.97 | 135.0 | ~~140.0~~ | ~~140.0~~ | 50 | 162.5 | ~~167.5~~ | ~~167.5~~ | 55 | 297.5 |
| 53 | Gabriel Prongué (SUI) | 84.88 | 125.0 | 130.0 | ~~132.5~~ | 56 | 162.5 | ~~167.5~~ | 167.5 | 52 | 297.5 |
| 54 | Andrei Denisov (ISR) | 84.89 | 132.5 | 137.5 | ~~140.0~~ | 49 | 152.5 | 160.0 | ~~165.0~~ | 58 | 297.5 |
| 55 | Jean Mbeumo (CMR) | 83.02 | 125.0 | ~~130.0~~ | ~~130.0~~ | 58 | 165.0 | 170.0 | ~~175.0~~ | 47 | 295.0 |
| 56 | Henry Coy (GUA) | 82.92 | 125.0 | ~~130.0~~ | ~~130.0~~ | 57 | 160.0 | ~~165.0~~ | ~~165.0~~ | 56 | 285.0 |
| 57 | Sergio Lafuente (URU) | 84.81 | 120.0 | 125.0 | 130.0 | 55 | 150.0 | ~~155.0~~ | 155.0 | 59 | 285.0 |
| 58 | Hans Jørgensen (DEN) | 84.82 | 122.5 | ~~130.0~~ | ~~130.0~~ | 60 | 160.0 | ~~165.0~~ | ~~165.0~~ | 57 | 282.5 |
| 59 | Jesper Jørgensen (DEN) | 82.56 | 117.5 | 122.5 | ~~125.0~~ | 59 | 150.0 | ~~155.0~~ | ~~155.0~~ | 60 | 272.5 |
| 60 | Stefano Guidi (SMR) | 84.78 | 120.0 | ~~125.0~~ | ~~125.0~~ | 61 | ~~150.0~~ | ~~150.0~~ | 150.0 | 61 | 270.0 |
| 61 | Trent Dabwido (NRU) | 84.53 | 105.0 | 110.0 | ~~115.0~~ | 62 | 145.0 | ~~152.5~~ | ~~152.5~~ | 62 | 255.0 |
| — | Samir Ghachem (TUN) | 84.78 | 160.0 | 165.0 | ~~167.5~~ | 13 | ~~180.0~~ | — | — | — | — |
| — | José Barros (ARG) | 84.88 | ~~137.5~~ | ~~137.5~~ | ~~137.5~~ | — | 167.5 | ~~172.5~~ | ~~172.5~~ | 51 | — |
| — | Norvell Busby (NED) | 82.03 | — | — | — | — | — | — | — | — | — |
| — | Dursun Sevinç (TUR) | 84.62 | ~~160.0~~ | ~~160.0~~ | ~~160.0~~ | — | — | — | — | — | — |
| DQ | Abdallah Al-Sebaei (SYR) | 84.52 | 157.5 | 162.5 | ~~165.0~~ | — | ~~190.0~~ | 190.0 | ~~195.0~~ | — | — |

== New records ==
| Snatch | 180.5 kg | Pyrros Dimas (GRE) | WR |
