= 2001 World Weightlifting Championships – Men's 85 kg =

The 2001 World Weightlifting Championships were held in Antalya, Turkey from November 4 to November 11. The men's competition in the light heavyweight (85 kg) division was staged on 8 November 2001.

== Medalists ==
Event	Gold		Silver		Bronze	
Snatch	Giorgi Asanidze (GEO)	180.0 kg	Aliaksandr Anishchanka (BLR)	177.5 kg	Milen Dobrev (BUL)	175.0 kg
Clean & Jerk	Giorgi Asanidze (GEO)	210.0 kg	Ernesto Quiroga (CUB)	210.0 kg	Aliaksandr Anishchanka (BLR)	207.5 kg
Total	Giorgi Asanidze (GEO)	390.0 kg	Aliaksandr Anishchanka (BLR)	385.0 kg	Milen Dobrev (BUL)	382.5 kg

== Records ==
Prior to this competition, the existing world records were as follows.

World Record	Snatch	Giorgi Asanidze (GEO)	181.0 kg	Sofia, Bulgaria	29 April 2000
World Record	Clean & Jerk	Zhang Yong (CHN)	218.0 kg	Ramat Gan, Israel	25 April 1998
World Record	Total	World Standard	395.0 kg	—	1 January 1998

== Results ==
Rank	Athlete	Body weight	Snatch (kg)				Clean & Jerk (kg)				Total
Rank	Athlete	Body weight	1	2	3	Rank	1	2	3	Rank	Total
1st place, gold medalist(s)	Giorgi Asanidze (GEO)	84.74	172.5	177.5	180.0	1st place, gold medalist(s)	207.5	210.0	~~215.0~~	1st place, gold medalist(s)	390.0
2nd place, silver medalist(s)	Aliaksandr Anishchanka (BLR)	84.52	172.5	~~177.5~~	177.5	2nd place, silver medalist(s)	202.5	207.5	~~212.5~~	3rd place, bronze medalist(s)	385.0
3rd place, bronze medalist(s)	Milen Dobrev (BUL)	84.58	165.0	170.0	175.0	3rd place, bronze medalist(s)	195.0	207.5	~~212.5~~	4	382.5
4	Valeriu Calancea (ROM)	83.96	160.0	165.0	167.5	6	205.0	~~210.0~~	~~210.0~~	6	372.5
5	Ernesto Quiroga (CUB)	84.82	155.0	160.0	~~165.0~~	11	205.0	210.0	~~215.0~~	2nd place, silver medalist(s)	370.0
6	Mariusz Rytkowski (POL)	84.28	160.0	165.0	~~167.5~~	9	195.0	200.0	202.5	7	367.5
7	Aslanbek Ediev (RUS)	84.36	167.5	~~172.5~~	~~172.5~~	7	195.0	~~200.0~~	200.0	8	367.5
8	Song Jong-shik (KOR)	83.70	150.0	155.0	~~160.0~~	13	190.0	205.0	~~210.0~~	5	360.0
9	Christos Christoforidis (GRE)	82.64	155.0	~~160.0~~	~~160.0~~	12	190.0	195.0	~~200.0~~	9	350.0
10	Natig Hasanov (AZE)	84.78	160.0	~~165.0~~	~~165.0~~	10	190.0	~~200.0~~	~~200.0~~	12	350.0
11	Konstantinos Papadopoulos (GRE)	84.12	~~155.0~~	155.0	~~162.5~~	14	190.0	~~195.0~~	~~195.0~~	11	345.0
12	José Moreno (COL)	84.46	145.0	150.0	152.5	15	~~180.0~~	180.0	185.0	14	337.5
13	Jairo Cossio (COL)	84.58	~~150.0~~	150.0	~~155.0~~	16	180.0	185.0	187.5	13	337.5
14	Julien Galipeau (CAN)	84.78	~~140.0~~	140.0	~~145.0~~	18	172.5	177.5	~~182.5~~	16	317.5
15	Anthony Arthur (GBR)	83.98	135.0	140.0	~~142.5~~	17	165.0	~~170.0~~	170.0	17	310.0
16	Gabriel Prongué (SUI)	84.62	122.5	~~127.5~~	~~127.5~~	19	155.0	160.0	~~167.5~~	18	282.5
—	Shahin Nassirinia (IRI)	84.68	~~172.5~~	~~172.5~~	172.5	4	~~210.0~~	~~210.0~~	~~215.0~~	—	—
—	Marc Huster (GER)	83.96	167.5	~~172.5~~	~~172.5~~	5	—	—	—	—	—
—	Georgi Gardev (BUL)	84.18	165.0	~~170.0~~	~~170.0~~	8	—	—	—	—	—
—	David Matam (CMR)	84.76	~~150.0~~	~~150.0~~	~~152.5~~	—	185.0	192.5	~~200.0~~	10	—
—	Stephen Ward (GBR)	84.90	~~145.0~~	~~145.0~~	~~145.0~~	—	175.0	180.0	~~185.0~~	15	—
DQ	Gagik Khachatryan (ARM)	84.52	175.0	~~180.0~~	180.0	—	205.0	207.5	~~210.0~~	—	—
