= Weightlifting at the 2002 Asian Games – Men's 85 kg =

Men's 85 kg at the 2002 Asian Games
- Venue: Pukyong National University Gymnasium
- Date: 7 October 2002
- Competitors: 9 from 7 nations

Medalists
gold medal	Song Jong-shik	South Korea
silver medal	Hadi Panzvan	Iran
bronze medal	Bakhtiyor Nurullaev	Uzbekistan

The men's 85 kilograms event at the 2002 Asian Games took place on October 7, 2002, at Pukyong National University Gymnasium.

== Schedule ==
All times are Korea Standard Time (UTC+09:00)

Date	Time	Event
Monday, 7 October 2002	18:00	Group A

== Records ==
Prior to this competition, the existing world, Asian and Games records were as follows.

World Record	Snatch	Andrei Rybakou (BLR)	182.5 kg	Havířov, Czech Republic	2 June 2002
World Record	Clean & Jerk	Zhang Yong (CHN)	218.0 kg	Ramat Gan, Israel	25 April 1998
World Record	Total	World Standard	395.0 kg	—	1 January 1998
Asian Record	Snatch	Shahin Nassirinia (IRI)	175.0 kg	Athens, Greece	26 November 1999
Asian Record	Clean & Jerk	Zhang Yong (CHN)	218.0 kg	Ramat Gan, Israel	25 April 1998
Asian Record	Total	Shahin Nassirinia (IRI)	390.0 kg	Athens, Greece	26 November 1999
Games Record	Snatch	Shahin Nassirinia (IRI)	170.0 kg	Bangkok, Thailand	11 December 1998
Games Record	Clean & Jerk	Shahin Nassirinia (IRI)	210.0 kg	Bangkok, Thailand	11 December 1998
Games Record	Total	Shahin Nassirinia (IRI)	380.0 kg	Bangkok, Thailand	11 December 1998

== Results ==
Legend

- NM — No mark

Rank	Athlete	Body weight	Snatch (kg)				Clean & Jerk (kg)				Total
Rank	Athlete	Body weight	1	2	3	Result	1	2	3	Result	Total
1st place, gold medalist(s)	Song Jong-shik (KOR)	84.55	162.5	167.5	~~170.0~~	167.5	~~202.5~~	202.5	205.0	205.0	372.5
2nd place, silver medalist(s)	Hadi Panzvan (IRI)	84.30	160.0	165.0	167.5	167.5	195.0	200.0	~~202.5~~	200.0	367.5
3rd place, bronze medalist(s)	Bakhtiyor Nurullaev (UZB)	84.85	~~160.0~~	160.0	165.0	165.0	190.0	200.0	~~205.0~~	200.0	365.0
4	Yuan Aijun (CHN)	84.50	~~160.0~~	160.0	~~170.0~~	160.0	~~200.0~~	200.0	~~212.5~~	200.0	360.0
5	Pavel Samoilov (KAZ)	84.85	155.0	160.0	~~165.0~~	160.0	190.0	~~195.0~~	~~195.0~~	190.0	350.0
6	Konstantin Galkin (KAZ)	83.80	150.0	~~157.5~~	~~157.5~~	150.0	180.0	190.0	~~195.0~~	190.0	340.0
7	Nguyễn Quốc Thành (VIE)	83.60	135.0	~~140.0~~	142.5	142.5	~~170.0~~	170.0	~~180.0~~	170.0	312.5
—	Mital Sharipov (KGZ)	84.35	~~160.0~~	—	—	—	—	—	—	—	NM
—	Shahin Nassirinia (IRI)	84.70	~~170.0~~	~~170.0~~	~~170.0~~	—	—	—	—	—	NM
