= 1998 World Weightlifting Championships – Men's 85 kg =

The 1998 World Weightlifting Championships were held in Lahti, Finland from 7 to 15 November 1998. The men's competition in the light-heavyweight (85 kg) division was staged on 13 November 1998.

== Medalists ==
Event	Gold		Silver		Bronze	
Snatch	Georgi Gardev (BUL)	177.5 kg	Pyrros Dimas (GRE)	177.5 kg	Yury Myshkovets (RUS)	175.0 kg
Clean & Jerk	Marc Huster (GER)	210.0 kg	Pyrros Dimas (GRE)	210.0 kg	Yury Myshkovets (RUS)	207.5 kg
Total	Pyrros Dimas (GRE)	387.5 kg	Marc Huster (GER)	385.0 kg	Yury Myshkovets (RUS)	382.5 kg

== Records ==
Prior to this competition, the existing world records were as follows.

World Record	Snatch	World Standard	177.5 kg	—	1 January 1998
World Record	Clean & Jerk	Zhang Yong (CHN)	218.0 kg	Ramat Gan, Israel	25 April 1998
World Record	Total	World Standard	395.0 kg	—	1 January 1998

== Results ==
Rank	Athlete	Body weight	Snatch (kg)				Clean & Jerk (kg)				Total
Rank	Athlete	Body weight	1	2	3	Rank	1	2	3	Rank	Total
1st place, gold medalist(s)	Pyrros Dimas (GRE)	84.28	172.5	~~178.0~~	178.0	2nd place, silver medalist(s)	~~207.5~~	210.0	~~212.5~~	2nd place, silver medalist(s)	387.5
2nd place, silver medalist(s)	Marc Huster (GER)	84.23	167.5	172.5	175.0	4	205.0	210.0	~~212.5~~	1st place, gold medalist(s)	385.0
3rd place, bronze medalist(s)	Yury Myshkovets (RUS)	84.12	170.0	~~175.0~~	175.0	3rd place, bronze medalist(s)	197.5	202.5	207.5	3rd place, bronze medalist(s)	382.5
4	Iurie Cojuhari (MDA)	84.27	170.0	175.0	~~178.0~~	5	197.5	202.5	205.0	6	380.0
5	Georgi Gardev (BUL)	82.66	170.0	175.0	177.5	1st place, gold medalist(s)	200.0	~~205.0~~	~~205.0~~	8	377.5
6	Dursun Sevinç (TUR)	84.92	~~165.0~~	165.0	170.0	7	207.5	~~212.5~~	~~212.5~~	5	377.5
7	Krzysztof Siemion (POL)	84.48	160.0	165.0	167.5	8	200.0	207.5	~~210.0~~	4	375.0
8	Kiril Kounev (AUS)	84.67	165.0	170.0	~~172.5~~	6	205.0	~~210.0~~	~~210.0~~	7	375.0
9	Nasser Adel (EGY)	84.70	150.0	155.0	157.5	9	185.0	190.0	~~195.0~~	12	347.5
10	Leon Griffin (GBR)	84.71	145.0	~~150.0~~	150.0	18	185.0	190.0	195.0	9	345.0
11	Magomed Gortikov (AZE)	84.78	~~145.0~~	145.0	155.0	13	180.0	190.0	~~195.0~~	13	345.0
12	Ondrej Kutlík (SVK)	83.89	142.5	147.5	150.0	17	~~190.0~~	~~190.0~~	192.5	10	342.5
13	Francesco De Tommaso (ITA)	84.62	147.5	~~152.5~~	152.5	15	185.0	190.0	~~192.5~~	11	342.5
14	Álvaro Velasco (COL)	83.37	147.5	152.5	155.0	10	180.0	~~185.0~~	185.0	15	340.0
15	Tofik Heydarov (AZE)	84.95	155.0	~~160.0~~	~~160.0~~	14	185.0	~~195.0~~	~~195.0~~	16	340.0
16	Mohamed Mousa (EGY)	83.95	147.5	152.5	155.0	11	~~180.0~~	~~180.0~~	180.0	17	335.0
17	Santiago Martínez (ESP)	84.43	145.0	150.0	155.0	12	180.0	~~185.0~~	~~185.0~~	18	335.0
18	Sergio Mannironi (ITA)	81.78	147.5	~~152.5~~	~~152.5~~	19	180.0	185.0	~~187.5~~	14	332.5
19	Stephen Ward (GBR)	84.90	140.0	145.0	~~150.0~~	22	175.0	~~180.0~~	~~180.0~~	21	320.0
20	Damian Brown (AUS)	81.19	130.0	135.0	140.0	24	170.0	175.0	~~180.0~~	20	315.0
21	Eric Chevrier (CAN)	84.02	135.0	~~140.0~~	140.0	25	160.0	~~167.5~~	167.5	22	307.5
22	Robert Doucet (CAN)	84.31	~~135.0~~	135.0	140.0	26	162.5	167.5	~~170.0~~	23	307.5
23	Jaarli Pirkkiö (FIN)	84.36	135.0	~~140.0~~	140.0	27	~~165.0~~	~~165.0~~	165.0	24	305.0
24	Atila Sebescen (CRO)	84.44	~~155.0~~	135.0	~~142.5~~	28	165.0	~~175.0~~	~~175.0~~	25	300.0
25	Ivica Brešković (CRO)	84.89	115.0	~~120.0~~	~~125.0~~	29	140.0	150.0	~~160.0~~	26	265.0
—	Zhang Yong (CHN)	82.63	150.0	~~155.0~~	~~155.0~~	16	~~200.0~~	~~200.0~~	~~200.0~~	—	—
—	Dainis Zīlītis (LAT)	84.74	147.5	~~152.5~~	~~152.5~~	20	~~170.0~~	~~170.0~~	~~170.0~~	—	—
—	José Llerena (ECU)	82.14	145.0	~~150.0~~	~~150.0~~	21	~~185.0~~	~~185.0~~	~~185.0~~	—	—
—	Toni Puurunen (FIN)	84.58	142.5	~~147.5~~	~~147.5~~	23	—	—	—	—	—
—	Aleksandrs Žerebkovs (LAT)	84.78	~~155.0~~	~~155.0~~	~~155.0~~	—	180.0	~~185.0~~	~~185.0~~	19	—

== New records ==
Snatch	178.0 kg	Pyrros Dimas (GRE)	WR
