= Panagiotis Spyrou (weightlifter, born 2009) =

Greek weightlifter (born 2009)

Personal information
- Full name: Panagiotis Spyrou
- National team: National Team Of Greece
- Born: 14 July 2009 (age 17) Athens, Greece
- Height: 175 cm (5 ft 9 in)
- Weight: 71.00 kg (156.53 lb)

Sport
- Country: Greece
- Sport: Weightlifting
- Weight class: 71 kg
- Club: P.A.S. Antagoras, Kos (GRE)
- Coached by: Christos Spyrou

Achievements and titles
- Personal bests: Snatch: 120 kg (2025) Clean and Jerk: 143 kg (2025) Total: 263 kg (2025)

Panagiotis Spyrou (born 14 July 2009 in Athens) is a Greek male weightlifter,representing Greece at international competitions.The most recent competition in which he took part in was at the 2025 European Junior and U23 Weightlifting Championships in the 71 kg event where he managed to earn the 12th place in the total,and also set 28 new national records in all age categories,breaking those he had previously set in Madrid the same year.

His father Christos Spyrou was a Greek male weightlifter, competing in the 85 kg category and representing Greece at international competitions. He participated at the 1996 Summer Olympics in the 70 kg event and at the 2000 Summer Olympics in the 85 kg event. He competed at world championships, most recently at the 1999 World Weightlifting Championships.

His grandfather Panagiotis Spyrou was also a weightlifter and competed at the 1972 Summer Olympics (75 kg event).

== Major results ==
Year	Venue	Weight	Snatch (kg)				Clean & Jerk (kg)				Total	Rank
Year	Venue	Weight	1	2	3	Rank	1	2	3	Rank	Total	Rank
World Championships
2023	Durrës, Albania	55 kg	63	66	69	15	83	87	91	15	160	14
European Championships
2022	Raszyn, Poland	49kg	50	53	56	8	65	70	71	8	127	8
2023	Chișinău, Moldova	55kg	70	73	75	9	~~90~~	90	95	8	170	9
2024	Thessaloniki, Greece	61kg	87	92	95	5	107	113	~~117~~	5	208	4
2025	Madrid, Spain	71kg	110	~~115~~	115	8	130	~~135~~	135	7	250	7
2025	Durrës, Albania	71kg	115	119	120	16	135	140	143	15	263	13
