= Rishat =

Rishat may refer to:

- Rishat Khaibullin, Kazakh competition climber
- Rishat Mansurov, Kazakh weightlifter
- Rishat Shafikov, Russian race walker
