= Varea =

Varea may refer to:

- Juan Manuel Varea (born 1986), Argentine footballer
- Rupeni Varea (born 1968), Romanian weightlifter
- CD Varea, Spanish football team
- Varea, a locality in Logroño, La Rioja, Spain
