= Galipeau =

Galipeau is a surname. Notable people with the surname include:

- Céline Galipeau, Canadian news anchor
- Jacques Galipeau (1923–2020), Canadian actor
- Julien Galipeau (born 1981), Canadian weightlifter
- Royal Galipeau (1947–2018), Canadian politician
