= Pshatavan =

Village in Armavir, Armenia

Pshatavan Փշատավան
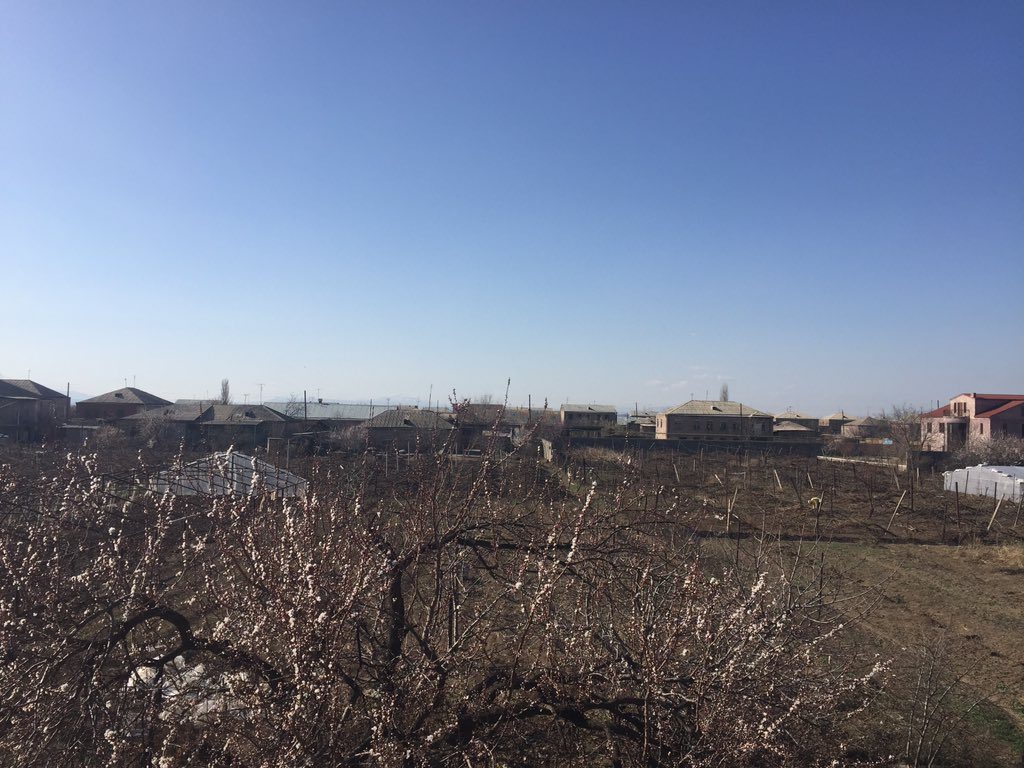
- Pshatavan, Armenia

- Location within Armenia
- Coordinates: 40°02′26″N 44°04′03″E
- Country: Armenia
- Province: Armavir

Population (2011)
  - Total: 2,058
- Time zone: UTC+4 ( )
  - Summer (DST): UTC+5 ( )

Pshatavan (Armenian: Փշատավան); formerly, Igdalu and Igdali) is a village in the Armavir Province of Armenia.

== Notable people ==
- Gagik Khachatryan, retired Olympic weightlifter.

== See also ==
- Armavir Province
