= Aliaksandr Anishchanka =

Belarusian weightlifter (born 1979)

Personal information
- Full name: Aliaksandr Uladzimiravich Anishchanka
- Born: 15 April 1979 (age 45)
- Height: 171 cm (5 ft 7 in)
- Weight: 84.44 kg (186 lb)

Sport
- Country: Belarus
- Sport: Weightlifting
- Weight class: 85 kg (187 lb)
- Club: Dynamo Vitebsk, Vitebsk (BLR)
- Team: National team
- Updated on 13 September 2016

Aliaksandr Uladzimiravich Anishchanka (Belarusian: Аляксандр Уладзіміравіч Анішчанка, born 15 April 1979), also known as Aleksandr Vladimirovich Anishchenko (Russian: Александр Владимирович Анищенко), is a Belarusian male weightlifter, competing in the 85 kg category and representing Belarus at international competitions. He participated at the 2004 Summer Olympics in the 85 kg event. He competed at world championships, most recently at the 2003 World Weightlifting Championships.

== Major results ==
Year	Venue	Weight	Snatch (kg)				Clean & Jerk (kg)				Total	Rank
Year	Venue	Weight	1	2	3	Rank	1	2	3	Rank	Total	Rank
Summer Olympics
2004	Athens, Greece	85 kg				—				—		6
World Championships
2003	Vancouver, Canada	85 kg	172.5	~~177.5~~	~~177.5~~	3rd place, bronze medalist(s)	205	~~210~~	~~210~~	4	377.5	4
2001	Antalya, Turkey	85 kg	172.5	~~177.5~~	177.5	2nd place, silver medalist(s)	202.5	207.5	~~212.5~~	3rd place, bronze medalist(s)	385	2nd place, silver medalist(s)
