= 2003 World Weightlifting Championships – Men's 85 kg =

Weightlifting competition

The 2003 World Weightlifting Championships were held in Vancouver, Canada from 14 November to 22 November. The men's 85 kilograms division was staged on 18 and 19 November 2003.

== Schedule ==
| Date | Time | Event |
|---|---|---|
| 18 November 2003 | 14:00 | Group D |
| 19 November 2003 | 10:00 | Group C |
| 19 November 2003 | 15:00 | Group B |
| 19 November 2003 | 20:00 | Group A |

== Medalists ==
| Event | Gold | | Silver | | Bronze | |
|---|---|---|---|---|---|---|
| Snatch | Sergo Chakhoyan (AUS) | 172.5 kg | Erdal Sunar (TUR) | 172.5 kg | Aliaksandr Anishchanka (BLR) | 172.5 kg |
| Clean & Jerk | Valeriu Calancea (ROM) | 215.0 kg | Yuan Aijun (CHN) | 212.5 kg | Sergo Chakhoyan (AUS) | 205.0 kg |
| Total | Valeriu Calancea (ROM) | 382.5 kg | Yuan Aijun (CHN) | 382.5 kg | Sergo Chakhoyan (AUS) | 377.5 kg |

== Records ==
Prior to this competition, the existing world records were as follows.

| World Record | Snatch | Andrei Rybakou (BLR) | 182.5 kg | Havířov, Czech Republic | 2 June 2002 |
| World Record | Clean & Jerk | Zhang Yong (CHN) | 218.0 kg | Ramat Gan, Israel | 25 April 1998 |
| World Record | Total | World Standard | 395.0 kg | — | 1 January 1998 |

== Results ==
| Rank | Athlete | Group | Body weight | Snatch (kg) | | | | Clean & Jerk (kg) | | | | Total |
| Rank | Athlete | Group | Body weight | 1 | 2 | 3 | Rank | 1 | 2 | 3 | Rank | Total |
|---|---|---|---|---|---|---|---|---|---|---|---|---|
| 1st place, gold medalist(s) | Valeriu Calancea (ROM) | A | 84.45 | 162.5 | 167.5 | ~~170.0~~ | 8 | 205.0 | 210.0 | 215.0 | 1st place, gold medalist(s) | 382.5 |
| 2nd place, silver medalist(s) | Yuan Aijun (CHN) | A | 84.53 | 165.0 | 170.0 | ~~175.0~~ | 4 | 200.0 | ~~210.0~~ | 212.5 | 2nd place, silver medalist(s) | 382.5 |
| 3rd place, bronze medalist(s) | Sergo Chakhoyan (AUS) | A | 82.70 | 172.5 | ~~177.5~~ | ~~177.5~~ | 1st place, gold medalist(s) | ~~202.5~~ | 202.5 | 205.0 | 3rd place, bronze medalist(s) | 377.5 |
| 4 | Aliaksandr Anishchanka (BLR) | A | 84.44 | 172.5 | ~~177.5~~ | ~~177.5~~ | 3rd place, bronze medalist(s) | 205.0 | ~~210.0~~ | ~~210.0~~ | 4 | 377.5 |
| 5 | Erdal Sunar (TUR) | A | 84.40 | 170.0 | 172.5 | ~~177.5~~ | 2nd place, silver medalist(s) | ~~200.0~~ | 200.0 | ~~205.0~~ | 8 | 372.5 |
| 6 | Yury Myshkovets (RUS) | A | 84.83 | 170.0 | ~~172.5~~ | ~~172.5~~ | 5 | ~~200.0~~ | 200.0 | ~~210.0~~ | 10 | 370.0 |
| 7 | Ruslan Novikau (BLR) | A | 84.10 | 165.0 | ~~170.0~~ | ~~170.0~~ | 10 | 202.5 | ~~207.5~~ | ~~207.5~~ | 5 | 367.5 |
| 8 | Ilir Kafarani (ALB) | B | 83.95 | ~~160.0~~ | 160.0 | 165.0 | 9 | ~~200.0~~ | 200.0 | ~~205.0~~ | 6 | 365.0 |
| 9 | Hadi Panzvan (IRI) | B | 84.38 | 162.5 | 167.5 | ~~170.0~~ | 7 | 192.5 | 197.5 | ~~202.5~~ | 11 | 365.0 |
| 10 | Mariusz Rytkowski (POL) | A | 84.80 | 165.0 | ~~170.0~~ | ~~170.0~~ | 12 | ~~200.0~~ | 200.0 | ~~202.5~~ | 9 | 365.0 |
| 11 | Ramzi Al-Mahrous (KSA) | B | 84.36 | 155.0 | 160.0 | ~~165.0~~ | 14 | ~~200.0~~ | 200.0 | ~~207.5~~ | 7 | 360.0 |
| 12 | Olexiy Petrov (UKR) | B | 84.87 | 160.0 | 165.0 | ~~170.0~~ | 13 | ~~190.0~~ | 190.0 | 192.5 | 18 | 357.5 |
| 13 | Oscar Chaplin (USA) | C | 84.70 | 155.0 | 160.0 | 165.0 | 11 | 190.0 | ~~195.0~~ | ~~195.0~~ | 20 | 355.0 |
| 14 | Donatas Anuškevičius (LTU) | B | 84.48 | ~~157.5~~ | ~~157.5~~ | 157.5 | 16 | 195.0 | ~~200.0~~ | ~~200.0~~ | 13 | 352.5 |
| 15 | Natig Hasanov (AZE) | B | 84.49 | ~~157.5~~ | 157.5 | — | 17 | 187.5 | 195.0 | ~~200.0~~ | 14 | 352.5 |
| 16 | Tigran Kamalyan (ARM) | B | 84.55 | 157.5 | ~~162.5~~ | ~~162.5~~ | 18 | 195.0 | ~~202.5~~ | ~~202.5~~ | 15 | 352.5 |
| 17 | Gevorg Aleksanyan (ARM) | B | 79.61 | ~~155.0~~ | 155.0 | ~~160.0~~ | 19 | 185.0 | 192.5 | 195.0 | 12 | 350.0 |
| 18 | Georgi Gardev (BUL) | B | 83.87 | 167.5 | ~~172.5~~ | ~~172.5~~ | 6 | 182.5 | ~~187.5~~ | ~~187.5~~ | 27 | 350.0 |
| 19 | Ondrej Kutlík (SVK) | B | 84.65 | ~~152.5~~ | 152.5 | 155.0 | 22 | ~~192.5~~ | 192.5 | ~~197.5~~ | 17 | 347.5 |
| 20 | Abdallah Al-Sebaei (SYR) | B | 83.47 | 155.0 | ~~160.0~~ | ~~160.0~~ | 21 | 190.0 | ~~197.5~~ | ~~197.5~~ | 19 | 345.0 |
| 21 | Héctor Ballesteros (COL) | C | 83.39 | 150.0 | ~~155.0~~ | ~~155.0~~ | 25 | 190.0 | 192.5 | ~~200.0~~ | 16 | 342.5 |
| 22 | Zbyněk Vacurá (CZE) | C | 81.23 | 155.0 | ~~160.0~~ | ~~160.0~~ | 20 | 185.0 | ~~190.0~~ | ~~190.0~~ | 23 | 340.0 |
| 23 | David Matam (FRA) | C | 84.74 | 155.0 | ~~160.0~~ | ~~160.0~~ | 23 | 185.0 | ~~190.0~~ | ~~190.0~~ | 25 | 340.0 |
| 24 | Petr Hruby (CZE) | C | 83.67 | 152.5 | ~~157.5~~ | ~~157.5~~ | 24 | ~~182.5~~ | 182.5 | 185.0 | 24 | 337.5 |
| 25 | José Juan Navarro (ESP) | C | 84.20 | ~~150.0~~ | ~~150.0~~ | 150.0 | 27 | 182.5 | 187.5 | ~~192.5~~ | 21 | 337.5 |
| 26 | Francesco De Tommaso (ITA) | C | 84.91 | 150.0 | ~~155.0~~ | ~~155.0~~ | 29 | 187.5 | ~~190.0~~ | ~~190.0~~ | 22 | 337.5 |
| 27 | Peter May (GBR) | D | 84.78 | 150.0 | ~~155.0~~ | ~~155.0~~ | 28 | 175.0 | 180.0 | 185.0 | 26 | 335.0 |
| 28 | Toyotaka Murata (JPN) | C | 83.40 | 150.0 | ~~155.0~~ | ~~155.0~~ | 26 | 177.5 | ~~182.5~~ | ~~182.5~~ | 30 | 327.5 |
| 29 | Herbys Márquez (VEN) | D | 84.53 | 145.0 | ~~150.0~~ | ~~150.0~~ | 30 | 180.0 | ~~185.0~~ | ~~190.0~~ | 28 | 325.0 |
| 30 | Mohamed Eissa (EGY) | C | 84.57 | 140.0 | ~~145.0~~ | ~~145.0~~ | 32 | 180.0 | ~~185.0~~ | ~~185.0~~ | 29 | 320.0 |
| 31 | Moisés Cartagena (PUR) | D | 84.49 | 130.0 | 140.0 | ~~145.0~~ | 31 | 160.0 | 170.0 | ~~175.0~~ | 31 | 310.0 |
| 32 | Jason MacLean (CAN) | D | 83.75 | ~~127.5~~ | 127.5 | ~~130.0~~ | 33 | 155.0 | ~~160.0~~ | ~~160.0~~ | 33 | 282.5 |
| 33 | Gabriel Prongué (SUI) | D | 84.23 | 115.0 | 120.0 | ~~125.0~~ | 35 | 150.0 | 157.5 | ~~162.5~~ | 32 | 277.5 |
| 34 | Julian McWatt (GUY) | D | 84.34 | 122.5 | ~~127.5~~ | ~~127.5~~ | 34 | 145.0 | ~~152.5~~ | 152.5 | 34 | 275.0 |
| — | Rutherford Jeremiah (NRU) | D | 83.86 | ~~125.0~~ | ~~125.0~~ | ~~125.0~~ | — | — | — | — | — | — |
| — | Song Jong-shik (KOR) | A | 84.55 | ~~160.0~~ | 160.0 | ~~165.0~~ | 15 | ~~205.0~~ | ~~205.0~~ | ~~205.0~~ | — | — |
