= Krastyu Milev =

Bulgarian weightlifter (born 1969)

Personal information
- Nationality: Bulgarian
- Born: 14 September 1969 (age 56)

Sport
- Sport: Weightlifting

Achievements and titles
- Olympic finals: 1996 Summer Olympics

Krastyu Milev (Bulgarian: Кръстю Милев, born 14 September 1969) is a Bulgarian weightlifter. He competed in the men's light heavyweight event at the 1996 Summer Olympics.
