= Robert Doucet =

Canadian weightlifter (born 1975)

Personal information
- Full name: Robert Doucet
- Born: 5 August 1975 (age 50)
- Weight: 84.31 kg (185.9 lb)

Sport
- Country: Canada
- Sport: Weightlifting
- Weight class: 85 kg
- Team: National team
- Updated on 3 October 2016

Robert Doucet (born 5 August 1975) is a Canadian male weightlifter, competing in the 85 kg category and representing Canada at international competitions. He competed at world championships, most recently at the 1998 World Weightlifting Championships.

== Major results ==
Year	Venue	Weight	Snatch (kg)				Clean & Jerk (kg)				Total	Rank
Year	Venue	Weight	1	2	3	Rank	1	2	3	Rank	Total	Rank
World Championships
1998	Lahti, Finland	85 kg	~~135~~	135	140	26	162.5	167.5	~~170~~	23	307.5	22
