= Tofig Heydarov =

Azerbaijani weightlifter

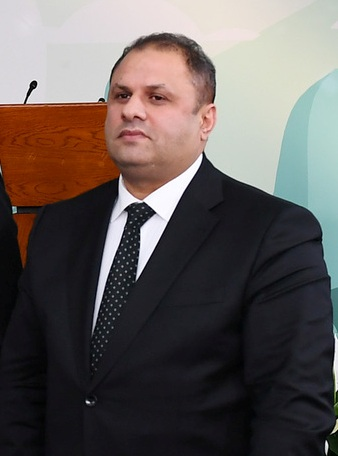

Personal information
- Nationality: Azerbaijani
- Born: 16 July 1972 (age 52)

Sport
- Sport: Weightlifting

Tofig Heydarov (born 16 July 1972) is an Azerbaijani weightlifter. He competed in the men's light heavyweight event at the 1996 Summer Olympics.
