= Giorgi Asanidze =

Georgian weightlifter & politician (born 1975)

Personal information
- Nationality: Georgian
- Born: 30 August 1975 (age 51) Sachkhere, Georgian SSR, Soviet Union
- Height: 1.73 m (5 ft 8 in)
- Weight: 85 kg (187 lb)

Sport
- Country: Georgia
- Sport: Weightlifting
- Events: 77 kg, 85 kg
- Retired: 2007
- Now coaching: Georgian National Team
Medal record
Men's weightlifting
Representing Georgia
Olympic Games
Gold medal – first place	2004 Athens	85 kg
Bronze medal – third place	2000 Sydney	85 kg
World Championships
Gold medal – first place	2001 Antalya	85 kg
Silver medal – second place	2002 Warsaw	85 kg
European Championships
Gold medal – first place	2000 Sofia	– 85 kg
Gold medal – first place	2001 Trenčín	– 85 kg
Gold medal – first place	2002 Antalya	– 85 kg
Silver medal – second place	1998 Riesa	– 77 kg

Giorgi Asanidze (Georgian: გიორგი ასანიძე; born 30 August 1975 in Sachkhere) is a Georgian former weightlifter, Olympic Champion, World Champion, and three time European Champion who competed in the 85 kg and 77 kg categories.

== Career ==
=== Weightlifting ===
He competed at the 2000 Summer Olympics where he won a bronze medal (all three medalists had the same total of 390 kg, but the medals were determined by lowest body weight), and the 2004 Summer Olympics where he won gold.

He is currently the coach for the Georgian National Weightlifting Team, including European medalist Goga Chkheidze, European champion Shota Mishvelidze, Olympic bronze medalist Anton Pliesnoi, and three-time Olympic champion Lasha Talakhadze.

=== Government ===
He was elected to the Parliament of Georgia from the United National Movement in 2004. He was reelected in the May 2008 Parliamentary election from Tbilisi's Gldani constituency on the same party ticket.

== Major results ==
Year	Venue	Weight	Snatch (kg)				Clean & Jerk (kg)				Total	Rank
Year	Venue	Weight	1	2	3	Rank	1	2	3	Rank	Total	Rank
Olympic Games
2000	Sydney, Australia	85 kg	~~175.0~~	175.0	180.0	1	210.0	~~215.0~~	~~215.0~~	4	390.0	3rd place, bronze medalist(s)
2004	Athens, Greece	85 kg	172.5	177.5	~~180.0~~	2	202.5	205.0	~~207.5~~	1	382.5	1st place, gold medalist(s)
World Championships
1998	Lahti, Finland	77 kg	160.0	165.0	168.0 WR	1st place, gold medalist(s)	190.0	~~195.0~~	~~195.0~~	13	357.5	6
1999	Athens, Greece	85 kg	170.0	175.0	177.5	2nd place, silver medalist(s)	~~200~~	200.0	~~207.5~~	9	377.5	6
2001	Antalya, Turkey	85 kg	172.5	177.5	180.0	1st place, gold medalist(s)	207.5	210.0	~~215.0~~	1st place, gold medalist(s)	390.0	1st place, gold medalist(s)
2002	Warsaw, Poland	85 kg	~~172.5~~	172.5	177.5	1st place, gold medalist(s)	~~202.5~~	205.0	207.5	4	385.0	2nd place, silver medalist(s)
2007	Chiang Mai, Thailand	85 kg	160	~~164~~	~~164~~	12	~~187~~	~~187~~	~~187~~	--	--	--
European Championships
1995	Warsaw, Poland	83 kg	160.0			7	187.5			9	347.5	8
1998	Riesa, Germany	77 kg	160.0	165.0	~~168.0~~	2nd place, silver medalist(s)	190.0	~~195.0~~	195.0	4	360.0	2nd place, silver medalist(s)
2000	Sofia, Bulgaria	85 kg	172.5	177.5	181.0 WR	1st place, gold medalist(s)	205.0	~~207.5~~	210.0	2nd place, silver medalist(s)	390.0	1st place, gold medalist(s)
2001	Trenčín, Slovakia	85 kg	170.0	172.5	175.0	1st place, gold medalist(s)	205.0	~~207.5~~	~~207.5~~	1st place, gold medalist(s)	380.0	1st place, gold medalist(s)
2002	Antalya, Turkey	85 kg	170.0	~~175.0~~	175.0	1st place, gold medalist(s)	202.5	205.0	~~207.5~~	2nd place, silver medalist(s)	380.0	1st place, gold medalist(s)
2004	Kyiv, Ukraine	85 kg	162.5	167.5	170.0	7	190.0	~~195.0~~	~~195.0~~	18	360.0	12

== Career bests ==
- Snatch: 181 kg
- Clean and jerk: 210 kg
- Total: 391 kg 2000 European Championship in the class to 85 kg.

Olympic Games
Preceded by Giorgi Kandelaki	Flagbearer for Georgia; 2000 Sydney	Succeeded by Zurab Zviadauri
