= Kuanysh Rymkulov =

Kazakhstani weightlifter

Personal information
- Full name: Kuanysh Rymkulov
- Born: 19 January 1972 (age 54)
- Weight: 84.94 kg (187.3 lb)

Sport
- Country: Kazakhstan
- Sport: Weightlifting
- Weight class: 85 kg
- Team: National team
- Updated on 2 October 2016

Kuanysh Rymkulov also written as Qwanış Rımqulov (Куаныш Рымкулов or Қуаныш Рымқұлов, born 19 January 1972) is a Kazakhstani male weightlifter, competing in the 85 kg category and representing Kazakhstan at international competitions. He participated at the 1996 Summer Olympics in the 83 kg event. He competed at world championships, most recently at the 1999 World Weightlifting Championships.

== Major results ==
Year	Venue	Weight	Snatch (kg)				Clean & Jerk (kg)				Total	Rank
Year	Venue	Weight	1	2	3	Rank	1	2	3	Rank	Total	Rank
Summer Olympics
1996	Atlanta, United States	83 kg				—N/a				—N/a		DNF
World Championships
1999	Piraeus, Greece	85 kg	150	155	160	21	180	185	~~187.5~~	38	345	28
