= Christos Spyrou =

Greek weightlifter (born 1976)

Personal information
- Full name: Christos Spyrou
- Born: 14 November 1976 (age 49) Athens, Greece
- Height: 170 cm (5 ft 7 in)
- Weight: 83.80 kg (184.7 lb)

Sport
- Country: Greece
- Sport: Weightlifting
- Weight class: 85 kg
- Club: Olympiacos, Athina (GRE)
- Team: National team
- Coached by: Panagiotis Spyrou

Achievements and titles
- Personal bests: Snatch:172.5kg (1999) Clean and jerk: 207.5kg (1999) Total: 380kg (1999)

Christos Spyrou (born November 14, 1976, in Athens, Greece) is a Greek weightlifter. He finished 13th in the 70 kg category at the 1996 Summer Olympics and 7th in the 85 kg category at the 2000 Summer Olympics. Spyrou also represented Greece at the 1999 World Weightlifting Championships, and most recently at the 2005 European Weightlifting Championships.

His father Panagiotis Spyrou was also a weightlifter and competed at the 1972 Summer Olympics (75 kg event).

His son Panagiotis Spyrou is also a weightlifter and competes representing Greece at international competitions.

== Major results ==
Year	Venue	Weight	Snatch (kg)				Clean & Jerk (kg)				Total	Rank
Year	Venue	Weight	1	2	3	Rank	1	2	3	Rank	Total	Rank
Summer Olympics
2000	Sydney, Australia	85 kg	170.0	~~175.0~~	~~175.0~~	6	~~205.0~~	205.0	~~210.0~~	6	375.0	7
1996	Atlanta, United States	70 kg	140.0	145.0	~~150.0~~	11	172.5	177.5	~~180.0~~	12	322.5	13
World Championships
1999	Piraeus, Greece	85 kg	172.5	~~177.5~~	~~177.5~~	6	207.5	~~212.5~~	~~212.5~~	2nd place, silver medalist(s)	380	4
1996	Warschau, Poland	70 kg	135.0	140.0	~~142.5~~	2nd place, silver medalist(s)	165.0	~~170.0~~	~~172.5~~	2nd place, silver medalist(s)	305.0	2nd place, silver medalist(s)
1995	Guangzhou, China	70 kg	137.5	142.5	~~148.0~~	14	~~177.5~~	~~177.5~~	~~177.5~~		---	
1995	Warschau, Poland	70 kg	135.0	~~140.0~~	140.0	2nd place, silver medalist(s)	~~165.0~~	165.0	~~170.0~~	3rd place, bronze medalist(s)	305.0	3rd place, bronze medalist(s)
1994	Jakarta, Indonesia	70 kg	120.0	---	---	10	150.0	---	---	8	270.0	7
1993	Cheb, Czech Republic	70 kg	112.5	---	---	19	145.0	---	---	16	257.5	17
European Championships
2005	Sofia, Bulgaria	85 kg	~~145.0~~	~~145.0~~	145.0	17	180.0	185.0	~~187.5~~	17	330.0	16
2003	Loutraki, Greece	85 kg	162.5	~~167.5~~	~~167.5~~	9	195.0	200.0	202.5	5	365.0	7
2002	Antalya, Turkey	85 kg	165.0	170.0	~~172.5~~	3rd place, bronze medalist(s)	~~200.0~~	~~200.0~~	~~200.0~~		---	
1999	La Coruna, Spain	77 kg	157.5	~~162.5~~	~~162.5~~	6	190.0	~~195.0~~	~~195.0~~	7	347.5	7
1998	Riesa, Germany	77 kg	140.0	145.0	147.5	10	180.0	~~185.0~~	~~185.0~~	12	327.5	10
1996	Prag, Czech Republic	70 kg	135.0	~~140.0~~	140.0	2nd place, silver medalist(s)	~~165.0~~	165.0	~~170.0~~	2nd place, silver medalist(s)	305.0	2nd place, silver medalist(s)
1996	Stavanger, Norway	70 kg	~~135.0~~	135.0	140.0	8	170.0	175.0	~~180.0~~	4	315.0	4
1995	Beer Sheva, Israel	70 kg	137.5	142.5	~~145.0~~	1st place, gold medalist(s)	~~170.0~~	170.0	~~175.0~~	3rd place, bronze medalist(s)	312.5	2nd place, silver medalist(s)
1994	Rome, Italy	70 kg	120.0			11	155.0			11	275	11
1992	Reims, France	67,5 kg	~~100.0~~	100.0	~~105.0~~	4	~~127.5~~	~~127.5~~	127.5	4	227.5	4
