= Steven Baccus =

Seychellois weightlifter (born 1977)

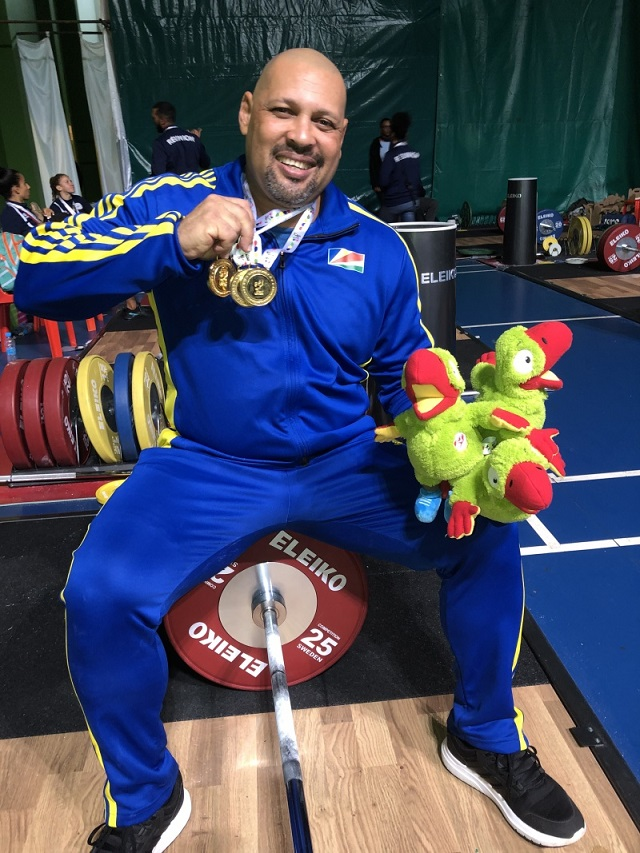
- Steven Baccus with his three gold medals from the 2019 Indian Ocean Island Games

Personal information
- Nationality: Seychellois
- Born: 20 November 1977 (age 48)
- Occupation: Firefighter
- Height: 1.72 m (5 ft 7 1/2 in)
- Weight: 81 kg (179 lb)

Sport
- Sport: Weightlifting
- Event: Men's 83 kg

Steven Jeffrey Baccus (born 20 November 1977) is a Seychellois former weightlifter and Olympian.

Competing in the men's 83 kg event at the 1996 Summer Olympics in Atlanta, Steven finished in sixteenth position with a total weight lifted of 260 kg.

Baccus competed in each of the six Indian Ocean Island Games held from 1998 to 2019, and won three gold medals at each of the games. His eighteen gold medals made him the most successful Seychellois athlete in the history of the games. He qualified for the 2019 African Games but withdrew due to injury.

In September 2020, Baccus announced his retirement from weightlifting for medical reasons.

In 2004, Baccus won the Seychellois sportsman of the year award.
