= Kuo Tai-chih =

Taiwanese weightlifter

Personal information
- Nationality: Taiwanese
- Born: 26 December 1973 (age 51)

Sport
- Sport: Weightlifting

Kuo Tai-chih (born 26 December 1973) is a Taiwanese weightlifter. He competed in the men's light heavyweight event at the 1996 Summer Olympics.
