= Joel Mackenzie =

Cuban weightlifter (born 1979)

Joël MacKenzie
Personal information
- Full name: Joël MacKenzie Díaz
- Born: 20 October 1979 (age 46) Camagüey, Cuba
- Height: 170 cm (5 ft 7 in)
- Weight: 103.99 kg (229.3 lb)

Sport
- Country: Cuba
- Sport: Weightlifting
- Weight class: 105 kg
- Team: National team
Medal record
Representing Cuba
Pan American Games
Gold medal – first place	2007 Rio de Janeiro	-105kg
- Updated on 9 September 2016

Joël MacKenzie Díaz (born 20 October 1979) is a Cuban male weightlifter, competing in the 105 kg category and representing Cuba at international competitions. He participated at the 2000 Summer Olympics in the 85 kg event. He competed at world championships, most recently at the 2007 World Weightlifting Championships.

== Major results ==
Year	Venue	Weight	Snatch (kg)				Clean & Jerk (kg)				Total	Rank
Year	Venue	Weight	1	2	3	Rank	1	2	3	Rank	Total	Rank
Summer Olympics
2000	Sydney, Australia	85 kg				—N/a				—N/a		11
World Championships
2007	Chiang Mai, Thailand	105 kg	~~170~~	170	176	9	206	~~215~~	215	10	391	8
1999	Piraeus, Greece	85 kg	155	~~160~~	160	20	185	190	~~195~~	30	350	23
