= Weightlifting at the 2000 Summer Olympics – Men's 85 kg =

Weightlifting at the Olympics

Men's 85 kg at the Games of the XXVII Olympiad
- Venue: Sydney Convention and Exhibition Centre
- Date: 23 September 2000
- Competitors: 20 from 17 nations

Medalists
1st place, gold medalist(s)		Pyrros Dimas	Greece
2nd place, silver medalist(s)		Marc Huster	Germany
3rd place, bronze medalist(s)		Giorgi Asanidze	Georgia

The men's 85 kilograms weightlifting event at the 2000 Summer Olympics in Sydney, Australia took place at the Sydney Convention and Exhibition Centre on September 23.

Total score was the sum of the lifter's best result in each of the snatch and the clean and jerk, with three lifts allowed for each lift. In case of a tie, the lighter lifter won; if still tied, the lifter who took the fewest attempts to achieve the total score won. Lifters without a valid snatch score did not perform the clean and jerk.

== Schedule ==
All times are Australian Eastern Time (UTC+10:00)

Date	Time	Event
23 September 2000	14:30	Group B
23 September 2000	18:30	Group A

== Records ==
Prior to this competition, the existing world and Olympic records were as follows.

World Record	Snatch	Giorgi Asanidze (GEO)	181.0 kg	Sofia, Bulgaria	29 April 2000
World Record	Clean & Jerk	Zhang Yong (CHN)	218.0 kg	Ramat Gan, Israel	25 April 1998
World Record	Total	World Standard	395.0 kg	—	1 January 1998
Olympic Record	Snatch	Olympic Standard	180.0 kg	—	1 January 1997
Olympic Record	Clean & Jerk	Olympic Standard	215.0 kg	—	1 January 1997
Olympic Record	Total	Olympic Standard	392.5 kg	—	1 January 1997

== Results ==
Rank	Athlete	Group	Body weight	Snatch (kg)				Clean & Jerk (kg)				Total
Rank	Athlete	Group	Body weight	1	2	3	Result	1	2	3	Result	Total
1st place, gold medalist(s)	Pyrros Dimas (GRE)	A	84.06	~~175.0~~	~~175.0~~	175.0	175.0	210.0	215.0	~~218.5~~	215.0	390.0
2nd place, silver medalist(s)	Marc Huster (GER)	A	84.22	172.5	~~177.5~~	177.5	177.5	205.0	210.0	212.5	212.5	390.0
3rd place, bronze medalist(s)	Giorgi Asanidze (GEO)	A	84.70	~~175.0~~	175.0	180.0	180.0	210.0	~~215.0~~	~~215.0~~	210.0	390.0
4	Krzysztof Siemion (POL)	A	84.46	162.5	~~167.5~~	167.5	167.5	202.5	207.5	212.5	212.5	380.0
5	Gagik Khachatryan (ARM)	A	84.68	170.0	175.0	~~180.0~~	175.0	200.0	205.0	~~210.0~~	205.0	380.0
6	Sergo Chakhoyan (AUS)	A	82.40	170.0	175.0	~~177.5~~	175.0	202.5	~~207.5~~	~~207.5~~	202.5	377.5
7	Christos Spyrou (GRE)	A	83.20	170.0	~~175.0~~	~~175.0~~	170.0	~~205.0~~	205.0	~~210.0~~	205.0	375.0
8	Ernesto Quiroga (CUB)	B	84.80	157.5	162.5	165.0	165.0	202.5	207.5	210.0	210.0	375.0
9	Mariusz Rytkowski (POL)	B	84.64	160.0	165.0	170.0	170.0	200.0	~~205.0~~	~~205.0~~	200.0	370.0
10	Valeriu Calancea (ROM)	A	84.74	155.0	160.0	~~162.5~~	160.0	195.0	~~205.0~~	205.0	205.0	365.0
11	Joel Mackenzie (CUB)	B	84.86	157.5	162.5	165.0	165.0	192.5	197.5	200.0	200.0	365.0
12	Nizami Pashayev (AZE)	B	84.16	155.0	~~166.0~~	~~166.0~~	155.0	197.5	~~203.5~~	203.5	202.5	357.5
13	Yury Myshkovets (RUS)	A	84.82	162.5	~~167.5~~	~~167.5~~	162.5	180.0	192.5	~~197.5~~	192.5	355.0
14	Bakhtiyor Nurullaev (UZB)	B	84.42	150.0	155.0	160.0	160.0	180.0	187.5	192.5	192.5	352.5
15	Mohamed Mousa (EGY)	B	84.62	155.0	160.0	~~162.5~~	160.0	~~185.0~~	185.0	192.5	192.5	352.5
16	Mital Sharipov (KGZ)	B	84.54	155.0	~~160.0~~	~~160.0~~	155.0	185.0	190.0	~~197.5~~	190.0	345.0
17	Sergio Mannironi (ITA)	B	83.18	~~150.0~~	150.0	~~155.0~~	150.0	180.0	~~190.0~~	~~190.0~~	180.0	330.0
18	Ofisa Ofisa (SAM)	B	84.80	135.0	~~140.0~~	~~140.0~~	135.0	175.0	~~180.0~~	~~180.0~~	175.0	310.0
19	Khodor Alaywan (LIB)	B	81.56	130.0	~~135.0~~	~~135.0~~	130.0	150.0	160.0	~~165.0~~	160.0	290.0
—	Shahin Nassirinia (IRI)	A	85.00	~~175.0~~	—	—	—	—	—	—	—	—
