= Hadi Panzvan =

Iranian weightlifter

Personal information
- Native name: سید هادی پانزوان لنگرودی
- Full name: Seyed Hadi Panzvan Langroudi
- Nationality: Iranian
- Born: December 12, 1975 (age 50) Gilan, Iran
- Weight: 84.10 kg (185.4 lb)

Sport
- Country: Iran
- Sport: Weightlifting
- Event: 85 kg

Achievements and titles
- Personal bests: Snatch: 167.5 kg (2002); Clean and jerk: 202.5 kg (2002); Total: 367.5 kg (2002)
Medal record
Representing Iran
Asian Games
Silver medal – second place	2002 Busan	85 kg
Asian Championships
Silver medal – second place	2004 Almaty	85 kg

Seyed Hadi Panzvan Langroudi (Persian: سید هادی پانزوان لنگرودی; born December 12, 1975) is an Iranian weightlifter who won the silver medal in the Men's 85 kg weight class at the 2002 Asian Games.

== Major results ==
Year	Venue	Weight	Snatch (kg)				Clean & Jerk (kg)				Total	Rank
Year	Venue	Weight	1	2	3	Rank	1	2	3	Rank	Total	Rank
World Championships
2002	Warsaw, Poland	85 kg	160	165	~~170~~	12	~~202.5~~	202.5	~~205~~	8	367.5	9
2003	Vancouver, Canada	85 kg	162.5	167.5	~~170~~	7	192.5	197.5	~~202.5~~	11	365	9
Asian Games
2002	Busan, South Korea	85 kg	160	165	167.5	1	195	200	~~202.5~~	2	367.5	2nd place, silver medalist(s)
Asian Championships
2004	Almaty, Kazakhstan	85 kg	162.5			2nd place, silver medalist(s)	197.5			2nd place, silver medalist(s)	360	2nd place, silver medalist(s)
