= Rupeni Varea =

Fijian weightlifter

Personal information
- Born: Rupeni Fesaitu Varea; August 13, 1968 (age 57) Oinafa, Rotuma

Sport
- Country: Fiji
- Sport: Weightlifting

Achievements and titles
- Olympic finals: 1996 Summer Olympics
Medal record
Pacific Games
Bronze medal – third place	2003 Fiji	Total
Bronze medal – third place	2003 Fiji	Snatch
Silver medal – second place	2003 Fiji	Clean & Jerk

Rupeni Fesaitu Varea (born 13 August 1968) is a Rotuman former weightlifter who represented Fiji.

== Career ==
Varea represented Fiji at the 1996 Atlanta Olympic Games. He finished 17th in the 83 kg division.

Varea was selected as the best performer of the Fiji contingent at the 1998 Commonwealth Games in Kuala Lumpur, Malaysia. This followed his fifth overall placing in the 85 kg division ahead of New Zealander James Swann with a total lift of 310 kg.

Fijian rugby union centre Ravai Fatiaki is his second cousin.
