= Weightlifting at the 1996 Summer Olympics – Men's 83 kg =

Weightlifting at the Olympics

Men's 83 kg at the Games of the XXVI Olympiad
- Venue: Georgia World Congress Center
- Date: 26 July 1996
- Competitors: 20 from 18 nations
- Winning total: 393 kg

Medalists
1st place, gold medalist(s)		Pyrros Dimas	Greece
2nd place, silver medalist(s)		Marc Huster	Germany
3rd place, bronze medalist(s)		Andrzej Cofalik	Poland

These are the results of the men's 83 kg competition in weightlifting at the 1996 Summer Olympics in Atlanta. A total of 20 athletes entered this event. The weightlifter from Greece won the gold, with a combined lift of 393 kg.

== Results ==
Each weightlifter had three attempts for both the snatch and clean and jerk lifting methods. The total of the best successful lift of each method was used to determine the final rankings and medal winners.

Rank	Athlete	Group	Body weight	Snatch (kg)				Clean & Jerk (kg)				Total
Rank	Athlete	Group	Body weight	1	2	3	Result	1	2	3	Result	Total
1st place, gold medalist(s)	Pyrros Dimas (GRE)	A	82.06	172.5	175.0	180.0	180.0	202.5	207.5	213.0	213.0	393
2nd place, silver medalist(s)	Marc Huster (GER)	A	82.36	~~170.0~~	170.0	~~172.5~~	170.0	202.5	207.5	213.5	213.5	382.5
3rd place, bronze medalist(s)	Andrzej Cofalik (POL)	A	82.44	~~167.5~~	167.5	170.0	170.0	~~202.5~~	202.5	~~205.0~~	202.5	372.5
4	Kiril Kounev (AUS)	A	82.73	165.0	170.0	~~172.5~~	170.0	200.0	~~205.0~~	~~205.0~~	200.0	370.0
5	Vadim Vacarciuc (MDA)	A	82.63	~~165.0~~	~~165.0~~	165.0	165.0	202.5	~~210.0~~	~~210.0~~	202.5	367.5
6	Sergo Chakhoyan (ARM)	A	80.87	165.0	170.0	~~172.5~~	170.0	195.0	~~200.0~~	~~202.5~~	195.0	365.0
7	Dursun Sevinc (TUR)	A	82.80	155.0	~~165.0~~	165.0	165.0	197.5	~~210.0~~	~~210.0~~	197.5	362.5
8	Krastyu Milev (BUL)	B	82.71	~~155.0~~	155.0	160.0	160.0	195.0	200.0	~~202.5~~	200.0	360.0
9	Bidzina Mikiashvili (GEO)	A	82.97	160.0	~~165.0~~	~~165.0~~	160.0	200.0	~~205.0~~	~~205.0~~	200.0	360.0
10	Rishat Mansurov (KAZ)	B	82.72	~~155.0~~	155.0	~~160.0~~	155.0	182.5	~~187.5~~	~~187.5~~	182.5	337.5
11	Tofig Heydarov (AZE)	B	82.83	150.0	~~160.0~~	~~162.5~~	150.0	180.0	~~190.0~~	~~190.0~~	180.0	330.0
12	Anthony Arthur (GBR)	B	81.99	140.0	147.5	~~152.5~~	147.5	170.0	180.0	~~187.5~~	180.0	327.5
13	Serge Tremblay (CAN)	A	82.44	145.0	150.0	~~155.0~~	150.0	177.5	~~185.0~~	~~185.0~~	177.5	327.5
14	Wu Tsai-fu (TPE)	B	77.89	~~137.5~~	137.5	~~142.5~~	137.5	170.0	~~175.0~~	175.0	175.0	312.5
15	Dainis Zīlītis (LAT)	B	82.53	~~145.0~~	145.0	~~150.0~~	145.0	167.5	~~172.5~~	~~172.5~~	167.5	312.5
16	Kuo Tai-chih (TPE)	B	81.86	~~125.0~~	125.0	~~132.5~~	125.0	~~165.0~~	165.0	~~170.0~~	165.0	290.0
17	Rupeni Varea (FIJ)	B	81.01	~~115.0~~	115.0	~~122.5~~	115.0	150.0	~~160.0~~	~~160.0~~	150.0	265.0
18	Steven Baccus (SEY)	B	81.11	105.0	110.0	115.0	115.0	145.0	~~150.0~~	~~150.0~~	145.0	260.0
	Oleksandr Blyshchyk (UKR)	A	82.56	152.5	167.5	~~170.0~~	167.5	~~192.5~~	~~192.5~~	~~192.5~~	–	–
	Kuanysh Rymkulov (KAZ)	B	82.82	~~155.0~~	~~155.0~~	~~155.0~~	–	–	–	–	–	–

== Sources ==
- "Official Olympic Report". International Olympic Committee. Archived from the original on 12 June 2007.
