= Gagik Khachatryan (weightlifter) =

Armenian weightlifter (born 1971)

Personal information
- Full name: Gagik Khachatryan
- Nationality: Armenian
- Born: 25 October 1971 (age 54) Pshatavan, Armenian SSR, Soviet Union
- Weight: 84.52 kg (186.3 lb)

Sport
- Country: Armenia
- Sport: Weightlifting
- Weight class: 85 kg
- Team: National team
- Updated on 28 September 2016

Gagik Khachatryan (Armenian: Գագիկ Խաչատրյան, born October 25, 1971, in Pshatavan, Armenian SSR) is an Armenian retired weightlifter. He competed at the 2000 Summer Olympics in the men's 85 kg division. He competed at world championships, most recently at the 2001 World Weightlifting Championships.

== Major results ==
Year	Venue	Weight	Snatch (kg)				Clean & Jerk (kg)				Total	Rank
Year	Venue	Weight	1	2	3	Rank	1	2	3	Rank	Total	Rank
World Championships
2001	Antalya, Turkey	85 kg	175	~~180~~	180	DSQ	205	207.5	~~210~~	DSQ	0	DSQ
1999	Piraeus, Greece	85 kg	~~160~~	160	165	14	190	~~200~~	200	11	365	9
