= Wu Tsai-fu =

Taiwanese weightlifter

Personal information
- Native name: 吳再富
- Nationality: Taiwanese
- Born: 22 May 1971
- Died: 2022 or earlier

Sport
- Sport: Weightlifting

Wu Tsai-fu
- Traditional Chinese: 吳再富
- Simplified Chinese: 吴再富
Transcriptions
Standard Mandarin
- Hanyu Pinyin: Wú Zàifù
- Wade–Giles: Wu2 Tsai4-fu4

Wu Tsai-fu (Chinese: 吳再富; 22 May 1971 – 2022 or earlier) was a Taiwanese weightlifter. He competed in the men's light heavyweight event at the 1996 Summer Olympics where he placed 14th. He competed in the fourth, fifth, and sixth weight classes in Taiwanese weightlifting contests. Wu received a silver medal in the clean and jerk event and a bronze medal in the total weight lifted at the 1997 Asian Weightlifting Championships. By 1997, Wu had set almost 20 national records.

Wu became a weightlifting coach. He coached the weightlifters Hsu Shu-ching and Chiang Nien-hsin. Wu was a coach at National Taiwan Sport University in Linkou District. For two years, he coached indigenous students at the Taoyuan Junior High School (Chinese: 桃源國中) in Taoyuan District, Kaohsiung.

== Biography ==
Wu initially trained in track and field. When he was 14 years old, he switched to weightlifting after the National Sports Training Center in Zuoying District sought to develop young weightlifters. His coach was Tsai Wen-yee who had won a bronze medal at the 1984 Summer Olympics. Wu represented Kaohsiung in the Taiwan Provincial Zhongzheng Cup Weightlifting Championships (Chinese: 台灣省中正杯舉重錦標賽) at the Tainan Municipal Gymnasium on 7 August 1987. Competing in the second weight class, he lifted a total weight of 200 kg (440 lb), which smashed the youth group record. On 9 December 1987, Wu represented Kaohsiung at the National Zhongzheng Cup Weightlifting Championships (Chinese: 全國中正杯舉重錦標賽) at Taichung Municipal Tong-Feng Junior High School. Competing in the third youth weight class, he placed first. Wu represented Kao-Yuan Vocational High School of Technology & Commerce at the National Youth Cup Weightlifting Championships (Chinese: 全國青年杯舉重賽) held at Taipei Municipal Huajiang Senior High School on 26 March 1988. Competing in the third youth weight class, he set two national youth records by lifting 122.5 kg (270 lb) in the clean and jerk and lifting a total weight of 222.5 kg (491 lb).

Wu competed on 29 July 1988 at the Guolan Cup Weightlifting Competition (Chinese: 國蘭杯舉重賽) held in Changhua County's Ciao Sin Elementary School, where he placed second in the third weight division. On 23 August 1988, Wu represented Kaohsiung at the National Zhongzheng Cup Weightlifting Championships (Chinese: 全國中正杯舉重錦標賽). In the third weight class, he set two youth group records by lifting 130 kg (290 lb) in the clean and jerk and 235 kg (518 lb) in total weight. Wu represented Kaohsiung in the third weight class in the district competition held on 27 October 1988 at Datung Elementary School in Miaoli. He received three gold medals. Wu competed for Kaohsiung at the National Zhongzheng Cup Weightlifting Championships (Chinese: 全國中正杯舉重錦標賽) at Hwa-Gang Junior High School on 20 December 1988. Competing in the third weight class, he received three gold medals. At the Taiwan Provincial Zhongzheng Cup Weightlifting Championships (Chinese: 台灣省中正杯舉重錦標賽) on 22 July 1989, Wu competed for the first time in the fourth weight class. Other than the snatch, his clean and jerk and total weight lifted was superior to the other contestants at the same weight class. Around 1990, Wu began studying at the National Taiwan Sport University.

During the Asian Youth Weightlifting Championships (Chinese: 亞洲青年舉重錦標賽) in August 1991, Wu received two bronze medals in the fourth weight class for the snatch and total weight categories. He lifted 125 kg (276 lb) in the snatch and 150 kg (330 lb) in the clean and jerk. During the World Cup Weightlifting Competition (Chinese: 世界杯舉重賽) in October 1991, he was told he had to provide a urine sample for a routine drug test. Unable to generate urine, he drank six huge glasses of beer to help him urinate. As he typically did not drink alcohol, he became intoxicated and needed fellow team members to help him return to the athletes' village. Owing to unexpected underperformance from Liao Hsing-chou and Chang Shun-chien, Wu received the gold medal in the fourth weight class of the district games held on 28 October 1991. He lifted 125 kg (276 lb) in the snatch and 150 kg (330 lb) in the clean and jerk for a total of 275 kg (606 lb). He represented Taiwan on 13 December 1991 at the Fucheng Cup International Weightlifting Invitational Tournament (Chinese: 府城杯國際舉重邀請賽), where he received the gold medal in the 67.5 kg (149 lb) weight class by lifting 275 kg (606 lb) in total through 125 kg (276 lb) in the snatch and 150 kg (330 lb) in the clean and jerk.

At the 1993 East Asian Games, Wu competed in the 70 kg (150 lb) weight class and ranked sixth. He set three national records in the snatch, clean and jerk, and total weight categories. He lifted 130 kg (290 lb) in the snatch and 160 kg (350 lb) in the clean and jerk for a total weight of 290 kg (640 lb). At the Youth Cup Weightlifting Championships (Chinese: 青年杯舉重錦標賽) held on 28 March 1994, Wu received three gold medals in the fourth weight class. He lifted 135.5 kg (299 lb) in the snatch and 160 kg (350 lb) in the clean and jerk. Wu, who had previously competed in the fourth weight class, competed in the sixth weight class of 83 kg (183 lb) at the National Zhongzheng Cup Weightlifting Championships (Chinese: 全國中正杯舉重錦標賽) on 22 December 1994. He received a gold medal after lifting 173.5 kg (383 lb) in the clean and jerk, which set a national record, and 132.5 kg (292 lb) in the snatch. By 1995, Wu was the owner of seven national records. To train himself and improve his performance, Wu put on 22 kg (49 lb) in the three months ending in April 1995. At the 1996 Asian Weightlifting Championships, Wu competed in the fifth weight class and set a national record in the clean and jerk by lifting 177.5 kg (391 lb).

Wu competed in the men's light heavyweight event at the 1996 Summer Olympics. He participated in Group B and placed 14th overall in the event. Wu lifted 137.5 kg (303 lb) in the snatch and 175 kg (386 lb) in the clean and jerk for a total weight of 312.5 kg (689 lb). At the 1997 Asian Weightlifting Championships in the fifth weight class, Wu received a silver medal in the clean and jerk by lifting 175 kg (386 lb), which was a personal record. He lifted 135 kg (298 lb) in the snatch, which put him in fourth place in that event. His total weight lifted was 310 kg (680 lb) which matched another competitor's. He received the bronze medal in the total weight category because he had weighed less than his competitor. By 1997, he had set national records almost 20 times.

Min Sheng Bao reported in 1996 that Wu was in a long-term relationship with Tsai Hui-wan (Chinese: 蔡惠婉), who had set a women's weightlifting national record in the first weight class on 23 October 1996. He decided to get engaged with her at the end of 1997. The couple got married on 11 February 1999. They trained girls at the Linkou Sports Academy (Chinese: 林口體院) in weightlifting.

Wu was a coach at National Taiwan Sport University in Linkou District. Yu Cheng-hsien, who was then the Ministry of the Interior, suggested that he teach young athletes. Wu agreed, thinking he'd be going to Taoyuan Junior High School (Chinese: 桃園市立桃園國民中學) in Taoyuan, Taiwan, which was close to Linkou District. However, he was sent to a similarly named school—differing by one Chinese character—the Taoyuan Junior High School (Chinese: 桃源國中) in Taoyuan District, Kaohsiung. He spent two years coaching indigenous tribal students in a mountainous area. Wu observed that the students were athletically gifted but were from poverty-stricken backgrounds. Using his own funds, Wu contributed roughly NT$35,000 (US$1,253) every month—two-thirds of his salary—to give his students scholarships, sports gear, meals, and nutritional supplements. He coached the weightlifters Hsu Shu-ching and Chiang Nien-hsin. After his stint in the mountains, he moved to Kaohsiung Municipal Wunshan Senior High Schoo, where he encouraged tall students to compete in handball and swimming and shorter, stockier students to compete in judo and weightlifting. Wu coached students from Namasia District, Taoyuan, Shanlin District, Laiyi, and Taiwu.

A 2022 article in the United Daily News reported that Wu was dead. The Kaohsiung City Sports Development Bureau (Chinese: 高雄市運發局) posthumously awarded him the Lifetime Achievement Award (Chinese: 終身成就獎).
