= Aleksandrs Žerebkovs =

Latvian weightlifter (born 1969)

Aleksandrs Zerebkovs
Personal information
- Born: 6 September 1969 (age 56) Daugavpils, Latvia
- Height: 169 cm (5 ft 7 in)
- Weight: 83.47 kg (184.0 lb)

Sport
- Country: Latvia
- Sport: Weightlifting
- Weight class: 85 kg
- Updated on 2 October 2016

Aleksandrs Zerebkovs (born 6 September 1969) is a Latvian male weightlifter, competing in the 85 kg category and representing Latvia at international competitions. He participated at the 1992 Summer Olympics in the 75 kg event. He competed at world championships, most recently at the 1999 World Weightlifting Championships.

== Major results ==
Year	Venue	Weight	Snatch (kg)				Clean & Jerk (kg)				Total	Rank
Year	Venue	Weight	1	2	3	Rank	1	2	3	Rank	Total	Rank
Summer Olympics
1992	Barcelona, Spain	75 kg				—				—		14
World Championships
1999	Piraeus, Greece	85 kg	150	~~155~~	155	24	172.5	177.5	180	40	335	34
1998	Lahti, Finland	85 kg	~~155~~	~~155~~	~~155~~	---	180	~~185~~	~~185~~	19	0	---
