= Yury Myshkovets =

Russian weightlifter

Personal information
- Full name: Yury Mikhaylovich Myshkovets
- Nationality: Kazakhstan; Russia
- Born: 1 June 1971 (age 55) Znamenskoye, Kazakhstan
- Height: 173 cm (5 ft 8 in)
- Weight: 84.83 kg (187.0 lb)

Sport
- Country: Russia
- Sport: Weightlifting
- Weight class: 85 kg
- Club: SKA St. Petersburg, St. Petersburg (RUS)
- Team: National team
- Updated on 17 September 2016

Yury Mikhaylovich Myshkovets (original name: Юрий Михайлович Мышковец, born 1 June 1971 in Znamenskoye) is a Kazakhstani born Russian male weightlifter, competing in the 85 kg category and representing Russia at international competitions. He participated at the 2000 Summer Olympics in the 85 kg event. He competed at world championships, most recently at the 2003 World Weightlifting Championships.

== Major results ==
- (gold) 1996 European Championships Light-Heavyweight class (367.5 kg)
- (bronze) 1997 European Championships Light-Heavyweight class (377.5 kg)
- (bronze) 2000 European Championships Light-Heavyweight class (375.0 kg)
- (silver) 2003 European Championships Light-Heavyweight class (380.0 kg)
- (silver) 2006 European Championships Light-Heavyweight class (372 kg)

Year	Venue	Weight	Snatch (kg)				Clean & Jerk (kg)				Total	Rank
Year	Venue	Weight	1	2	3	Rank	1	2	3	Rank	Total	Rank
Summer Olympics
2000	Sydney, Australia	85 kg				—N/a				—N/a		13
World Championships
2003	Vancouver, Canada	85 kg	170	~~172.5~~	~~172.5~~	5	~~200~~	200	~~210~~	10	370	6
1998	Lahti, Finland	85 kg	170	~~175~~	175	3rd place, bronze medalist(s)	197.5	202.5	207.5	3rd place, bronze medalist(s)	382.5	3rd place, bronze medalist(s)
