= Jason MacLean =

Canadian weightlifter

Personal information
- Full name: Jason McLean
- Born: 3 October 1973 (age 52)
- Weight: 83.99 kg (185.2 lb)

Sport
- Country: Canada
- Sport: Weightlifting
- Weight class: 85 kg
- Team: National team
- Updated on 2 October 2016

Jason McLean (born 3 October 1973) is a Canadian male weightlifter, competing in the 85 kg category and representing Canada at international competitions. He competed at world championships, most recently at the 2003 World Weightlifting Championships.

== Major results ==
Year	Venue	Weight	Snatch (kg)				Clean & Jerk (kg)				Total	Rank
Year	Venue	Weight	1	2	3	Rank	1	2	3	Rank	Total	Rank
World Championships
2003	Vancouver, Canada	85 kg	~~127.5~~	127.5	~~130~~	33	155	~~160~~	~~160~~	33	282.5	32
1999	Piraeus, Greece	85 kg	~~135~~	135	~~140~~	51	165	~~170~~	~~170~~	53	300	50
