= Julien Galipeau =

Canadian weightlifter

Personal information
- Nationality: Canadian
- Born: 29 January 1981 (age 44)
- Weight: 84.78 kg (186.9 lb)

Sport
- Country: Canada
- Sport: Weightlifting
- Weight class: 85 kg
- Team: National team
- Updated on 27 September 2016

Julien Galipeau (born 29 January 1981) is a Canadian male weightlifter, competing in the 85 kg category and representing Canada at international competitions. He competed at world championships, most recently at the 2001 World Weightlifting Championships.

== Major results ==
Year	Venue	Weight	Snatch (kg)				Clean & Jerk (kg)				Total	Rank
Year	Venue	Weight	1	2	3	Rank	1	2	3	Rank	Total	Rank
World Championships
2001	Antalya, Turkey	85 kg	~~140~~	140	~~145~~	18	172.5	177.5	~~182.5~~	16	317.5	14
