= Rishat Mansurov =

Kazakhstani weightlifter

Personal information
- Nationality: Kazakhstani
- Born: 30 June 1969 (age 56)

Sport
- Sport: Weightlifting

Rishat Mansurov (Ришат Мансурович Мансуров, born 30 June 1969) is a Kazakhstani weightlifter. He competed in the men's light heavyweight event at the 1996 Summer Olympics.
