= Marc Huster =

German weightlifter (born 1970)

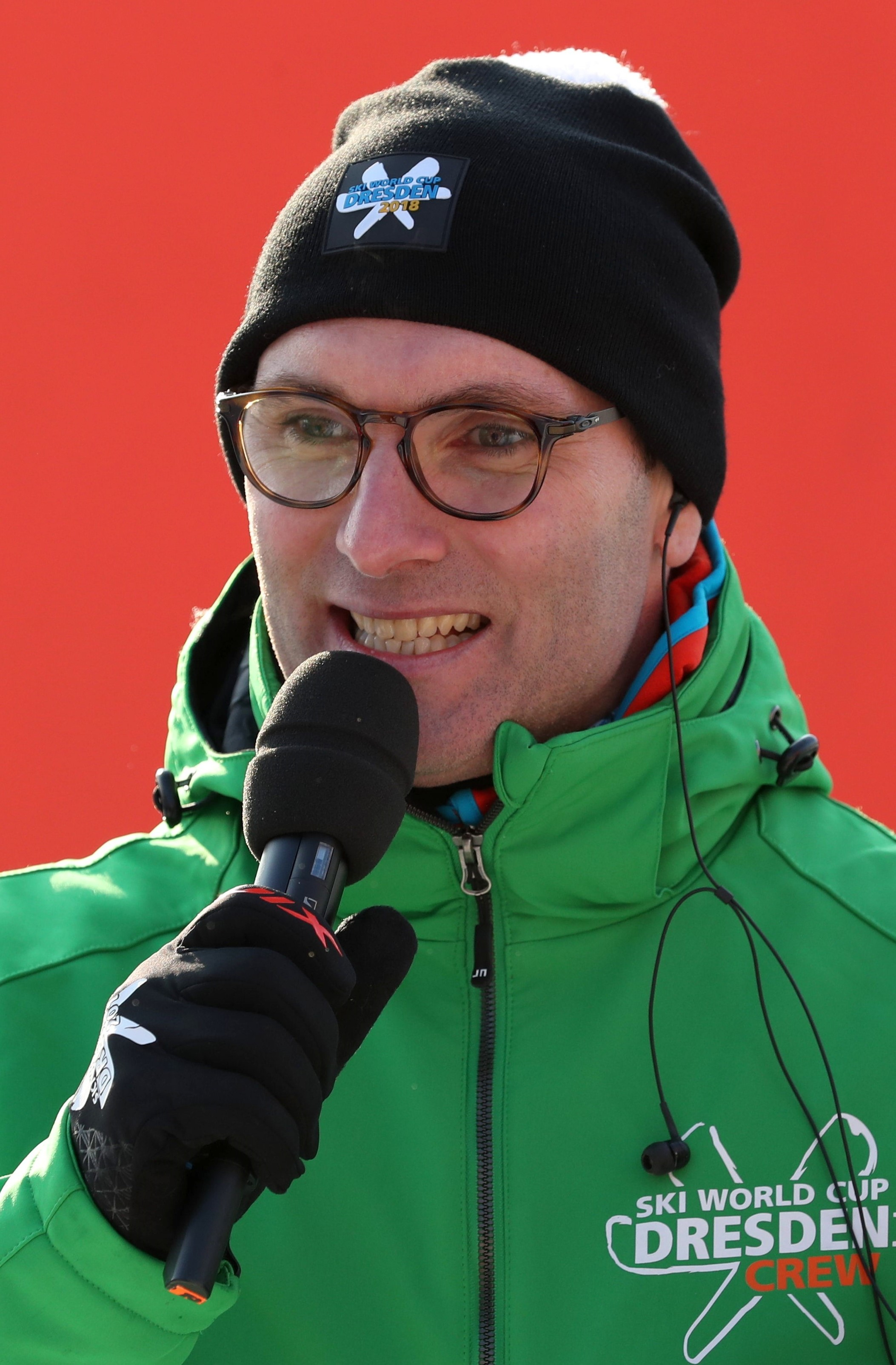
- Huster in 2018

Personal information
- Born: 1 July 1970 (age 56) Altdöbern, Bezirk Cottbus, East Germany
- Years active: 1991-2001
- Height: 1.74 m (5 ft 9 in)
- Weight: 85 kg (187 lb)

Sport
- Country: Germany
- Sport: Olympic weightlifting
- Events: –82.5 kg (1991-1992); –83 kg (1993-1997); –85 kg (1998-2001)
- Club: VfL Meißen; Chemnitzer AC; Riesaer AC

Achievements and titles
- Personal bests: Snatch: 177.5 kg (2000); Clean&Jerk: 215.0 kg (1994); Total: 390.0 (2000)
Medal record
Weightlifting
Representing Germany
Olympic Games
Silver medal – second place	1996 Atlanta	–83 kg
Silver medal – second place	2000 Sydney	–85 kg
World Championships
Gold medal – first place	1994 Istanbul	–83 kg
Silver medal – second place	1993 Melbourne	–83 kg
Silver medal – second place	1995 Guangzhou	–83 kg
Silver medal – second place	1998 Lahti	–85 kg
Bronze medal – third place	1999 Athens	–85 kg
European Championships
Gold medal – first place	1997 Rijeka	–83 kg
Gold medal – first place	1998 Riesa	–85 kg
Gold medal – first place	1999 La Coruña	–85 kg
- Updated on 20 June 2014

Marc Huster (born 1 July 1970 in Altdöbern) is a German weightlifter and sports commentator.

World Champion in Istanbul 1994, European Champion in Rijeka 1997, Riesa 1998, and Deportivo La Coruña 1999. World records in clean and jerk 1993 (210 kg) and 1996 (213.5 kg), world record in Olympic weightlifting combined 1994 (382.5 kg), European record in clean and jerk 1999 (215 kg).

He ranked 7th at the 1992 Summer Olympics in Barcelona, won a silver medal at the 1996 Summer Olympics in Atlanta in the 83 kg class, and another silver medal at the 2000 Summer Olympics in Sydney in the 85 kg class. Huster retired his weightlifting career in 2002.

Since 1997 he comments on weightlifting events for Eurosport, in 2002 he started working for German broadcaster Mitteldeutscher Rundfunk.

== Weightlifting career bests ==
- Snatch: 177.5 kg 1999 World Weightlifting Championships.
- Clean and jerk: 215.0 kg 1999 European Weightlifting Championships.
- Total: 390.0 kg 2000 Summer Olympics in the class to 85 kg.
