= Andrzej Cofalik =

Polish weightlifter

Personal information
- Born: September 8, 1968 (age 57) Palowice, Poland
Medal record
Men's Weightlifting
Representing Poland
Olympic Games
Bronze medal – third place	1996 Atlanta	83 kg
World Championships
Gold medal – first place	1997 Chiang Mai	– 83 kg

Andrzej Bogdan Cofalik is a weightlifter from Poland. He won the Bronze medal in the 83 kg in the 1996 Summer Olympics in Atlanta.
