= Mohamed Mousa =

Egyptian weightlifter

Personal information
- Full name: Mohamed Moussa El Dib
- Born: 27 August 1977 (age 48)
- Height: 173 cm (5 ft 8 in)
- Weight: 93.25 kg (205.6 lb)

Sport
- Country: Egypt
- Sport: Weightlifting
- Weight class: 94 kg
- Team: National team
- Updated on 14 September 2016

Mohamed Moussa El Dib (Arabic: مُحَمَّد مُوسَى الدِّيب; born 27 August 1977) is an Egyptian male weightlifter, competing in the 94 kg category and representing Egypt at international competitions. He participated at the 2000 Summer Olympics in the 94 kg event. He competed at world championships, most recently at the 2003 World Weightlifting Championships.

== Major results ==
Year	Venue	Weight	Snatch (kg)				Clean & Jerk (kg)				Total	Rank
Year	Venue	Weight	1	2	3	Rank	1	2	3	Rank	Total	Rank
Summer Olympics
2000	Sydney, Australia	94 kg				—N/a				—N/a		15
World Championships
2003	Vancouver, Canada	94 kg	165	~~167.5~~	~~170~~	22	~~200~~	---	---	---	0	---
1999	Piraeus, Greece	85 kg	~~150~~	~~155~~	155	25	185	190	195	17	350	20
1998	Lahti, Finland	85 kg	147.5	152.5	155	11	~~180~~	~~180~~	180	17	335	16
