= Ernesto Quiroga =

Cuban weightlifter

Personal information
- Born: 11 January 1975 (age 50); Havana, Cuba

Sport
- Sport: Weightlifting

Ernesto Quiroga (born 11 January 1975) is a Cuban weightlifter. He competed in the men's light heavyweight event at the 2000 Summer Olympics.
