= Pyrros Dimas =

Greek politician and former weightlifter

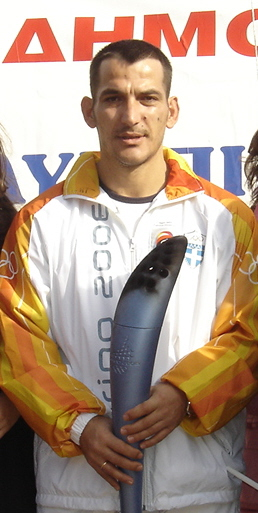

Personal information
- Citizenship: Greece; Albania
- Born: 13 October 1971 (age 55) Himarë, Albania
- Height: 173 cm (5 ft 8 in)
- Weight: 83 kg (183 lb)

Sport
- Country: Albania (1982–1992); Greece (1992–2004)
- Sport: Weightlifting
- Event: 85 kg

Achievements and titles
- Personal bests: Snatch: 180.5 kg (1999); Clean and jerk: 215 kg (2000); Total: 393 kg (1996)
Medal record
Men's weightlifting
Representing Greece
Olympic Games
Gold medal – first place	1992 Barcelona	-82.5 kg
Gold medal – first place	1996 Atlanta	-83 kg
Gold medal – first place	2000 Sydney	-85 kg
Bronze medal – third place	2004 Athens	-85 kg
World Championships
Gold medal – first place	1993 Melbourne	-83 kg
Gold medal – first place	1995 Guangzhou	-83 kg
Gold medal – first place	1998 Lahti	-85 kg
Silver medal – second place	1999 Athens	-85 kg
European Championships
Gold medal – first place	1995 Warszawa	-83 kg
Silver medal – second place	1998 Riesa	-85 kg
Bronze medal – third place	1992 Szekszard	-82.5 kg
Bronze medal – third place	1993 Sofia	-83 kg
Mediterranean Games
Gold medal – first place	1993 Languedoc-Roussillon	-91 kg

Pyrros Dimas (Greek: Πύρρος Δήμας; pronounced [piros ðimas]; born 13 October 1971) is a Greek politician and former weightlifter. He is currently the technical director for USA Weightlifting, having taken that position in June 2017. Dimas has also been involved in politics as a member of the Hellenic Parliament, representing the Panhellenic Socialist Movement from 2012 to 2015.

Dimas is the most decorated Greek athlete in the Olympics and is widely considered one of the greatest weightlifters of all time, having been three times Olympic Gold Medalist (in his fourth Olympiad, a knee injury notwithstanding, he won the bronze medal), and three times World Champion. He was named the Greek Male Athlete of the Year, for the years 1992, 1993, 1995, and 1996.

== Early years ==
Dimas was born on 13 October 1971 in Himarë, southern Albania, to ethnic Greek parents. Dimas started the sport at 11 and competed at a junior's level at 14. At 18, in 1989, he became triple Champion of Albania for the 82.5 kg category and in 1990 he repeated himself.

While in Albania, he was coached by Zef Kovaci. In 1990 he was also accorded the title "Master of Sports" by the Albanian government and the title "European Master" by the European Weightlifting Federation.

== Results representing Albania ==
He was part of the Albanian weightlifting team to which he made important contributions: In 1989 in the 62nd World Championship of Weightlifting Dimas ranked 12th in the World and helped Albania rank 13th in the world.

In the 69th European Weightlifting Championship (held in Aalborg, Denmark May 1990), Dimas ranked 4th in Europe and Albania ranked 3rd (after 1st placed USSR and 2nd placed Bulgaria), and in the European Cup for nations (in Antalya, Turkey, December 1990) Dimas, Leonidas Sabanis and Fatmir Bushi helped Albania rank 2nd in Europe (after 1st placed Bulgaria).

== Results representing Greece ==
During his stay in Aalborg he came in contact with representatives of the Greece national team: Giannis Sgouros and Christos Iakovou and he expressed great enthusiasm for a future cooperation. However, the political situation in Albania prohibited him from leaving the country. Dimas managed to cross the Greek-Albanian border at 7 February 1991, after a several hour exhaustive trip. He then stayed in Athens. He acquired Greek citizenship in 1992, and first competed under the Greek flag in the 1992 Summer Olympics, winning a gold medal in the 82.5 kg class.

During his third lift for the clean and jerk event, he shouted "Για την Ελλάδα!" (transliterated "Gia tin Ellada!"; meaning "For Greece!"), thus dedicating his victory to Greece. This is the catchphrase with which he is most associated in Greece.

At a time when Greece's success in the Olympics was limited, he and Voula Patoulidou, the surprise gold medalist in the 100m hurdles, became instant national heroes. They were greeted as such on their return to Greece at a grand ceremony attended by 60,000 people in the Panathinaikon Stadium in Athens, with a further 30,000 outside the stadium. His birthplace gave rise to his nickname "The Lion of Himara". His outstanding number of Olympic Gold Medals created another nickname "Midas".

Characteristic of his self-confidence was his tendency to keep the weights lifted after the buzzer had sounded so that the crowd could take photographs.

With the 1993 and 1995 World titles under his belt, Dimas was the favorite to win Olympic Gold in the 83 kg class for the 1996 Summer Olympics, where he was the flag bearer of the Greece Olympic team. He won the event with two new World Records.

At the 2000 Summer Olympics, he won another gold medal, this time in the 85 kg class. This made him one of just three weightlifters at that time to have won three Olympic gold medals; the others being Naim Süleymanoğlu (Turkey, but born in Bulgaria) and Kakhi Kakhiashvili (Greece, but born in Georgia). Halil Mutlu (like Süleymanoğlu, a Bulgaria-born Turk) would become the fourth in 2004.

At the 2004 Summer Olympics in Athens, Greece, Dimas was chosen as Greece flag bearer for both the opening and closing ceremonies. Dimas was recovering from knee surgery and a hurt wrist and was not expected to compete in these Olympics, but he came away with a bronze medal in the 85 kg class, becoming the fourth weightlifter in history to win a medal at four different Olympic Games, the third to win those four medals successively, and the only one whose four medals include 3 golds, thus cementing his status as a national hero in Greece and as an international weightlifting legend.

After earning the bronze medal he signalled his retirement by leaving his shoes on the platform, while the appreciative Greek crowd gave him a standing ovation.

In June 2008, Dimas became vice-president, and in October 2008 president of the Hellenic Weightlifting Federation.

== Political activities ==
In 2012, Dimas entered politics as a member of PASOK, being elected as a member of Greek parliament in the May and June 2012 elections. He was soon polemical with Greece's policies with Northern Epirus- his place of origin- claiming that the Greek government has "forgotten" it.

Dimas has campaigned for the rights of ethnic Greeks in Albania, drawing attention to alleged human rights abuses (in particular alleged land grabs against the Greek community of Himara), while calling on the Greek government to intervene. On 17 February 2014 Dimas participated in the ceremony of 100th anniversary of the declaration of Autonomy of the Republic of Northern Epirus. Dimas propagates against what he considers to be discrimination policies of the Albanian state against the Greek community of Himara, as well as of the rights of the Greek population of Northern Epirotes in general.

In an interview in 2016 he stated that "we are referring to Pontus, Cyprus, but for the first time Northern Epirus was heard in the Greek parliament when they saw me". At December 2018 Dimas protested against the confiscation of properties that belong to the ethnic Greek community of Himara and called the Albanian government to avoid discrimination of this kind.

On May 15, 2023, Dimas protested against the arrest and imprisonment by the Albanian authorities of the representative of the Greek minority, Fredis Beleris, on charges of vote buying. The latter was elected mayor of Himara.

He was candidate for European Parliament in the 2024 elections with New Democracy but failed to get elected.

== Personal life ==
Dimas was married to Anastasia Sdougkou, a former Hellenic Broadcasting Corporation sports reporter. Together they had four children. His wife died of brain cancer on 14 June 2018.

== Career bests ==
- Snatch: 180.5 kg 1999 in Athens in the class to 85 kg.
- Clean and jerk: 215.0 kg 2000 Summer Olympics in the class to 85 kg.
- Total: 393 kg 1996 Summer Olympics in the class to 83 kg.

== Major results ==
Year	Venue	Weight	Snatch (kg)				Clean & Jerk (kg)				Total	Rank
Year	Venue	Weight	1	2	3	Rank	1	2	3	Rank	Total	Rank
Olympic Games
1992	Barcelona, Spain	82.5 kg	162.5	~~167.5~~	167.5	1	202.5	~~207.5~~	~~207.5~~	4	370.0	1st place, gold medalist(s)
1996	Atlanta, United States	83 kg	172.5	175.0	180.0 WR	1	202.5	207.5	213.0 WR	2	393 WR	1st place, gold medalist(s)
2000	Sydney, Australia	85 kg	~~175.0~~	~~175.0~~	175.0	4	210.0	215.0	~~218.5~~	1	390.0	1st place, gold medalist(s)
2004	Athens, Greece	85 kg	170.0	~~175~~	175.0	3	202.5	~~205.0~~	~~207.5~~	4	377.5	3rd place, bronze medalist(s)
World Championships
1993	Melbourne, Australia	83 kg	170.0	175.0	~~177.5~~	1st place, gold medalist(s)	~~202.5~~	202.5	~~205.0~~	4	377.5	1st place, gold medalist(s)
1994	Istanbul, Turkey	83 kg	167.5	172.5	~~178.5~~	3rd place, bronze medalist(s)	~~200.0~~	~~200.0~~	~~200.0~~	--	--	--
1995	Guangzhou, China	83 kg	170.0	172.5	~~175.0~~	2nd place, silver medalist(s)	~~207.5~~	~~212.5~~	212.5	1st place, gold medalist(s)	385.0	1st place, gold medalist(s)
1998	Lahti, Finland	85 kg	172.5	~~178.0~~	178.0 WR	2nd place, silver medalist(s)	~~207.5~~	210.0	~~212.5~~	2nd place, silver medalist(s)	387.5	1st place, gold medalist(s)
1999	Athens, Greece	85 kg	175.0	180.5 WR	~~182.5~~	1st place, gold medalist(s)	207.5	~~212.5~~	~~212.5~~	3rd place, bronze medalist(s)	387.5	2nd place, silver medalist(s)
European Championships
1992	Szekszárd, Hungary	82.5 kg	160	165.0	~~170~~	3rd place, bronze medalist(s)	195	202.5		3rd place, bronze medalist(s)	367.5	3rd place, bronze medalist(s)
1993	Sofia, Bulgaria	83 kg	170.0			2nd place, silver medalist(s)	200.0			5	370.0	3rd place, bronze medalist(s)
1995	Warsaw, Poland	83 kg		176	177.5	1st place, gold medalist(s)		207.5	210.0	1st place, gold medalist(s)	387.5	1st place, gold medalist(s)
1998	Riesa, Germany	85 kg	~~167.5~~	167.5	172.5	2nd place, silver medalist(s)	200.0	205.0	~~210.0~~	3rd place, bronze medalist(s)	377.5	2nd place, silver medalist(s)
2000	Sofia, Bulgaria	85 kg	167.5	~~170.0~~	170.0	4	200.0	~~205.0~~	~~205.0~~	7	370.0	4
2004	Kyiv, Ukraine	85 kg	165.0	~~170.0~~	170.0	6	~~200.0~~	200.0	205.0	5	375.0	5

== See also ==
- List of multiple Summer Olympic medalists

Olympic Games
Preceded by Labros Papakostas	Flagbearer for Greece; Atlanta 1996	Succeeded by Nikolaos Kaklamanakis
Preceded by Nikolaos Kaklamanakis	Flagbearer for Greece; Athens 2004	Succeeded by Ilias Iliadis
