= James Swann (weightlifter) =

New Zealand weightlifter

Personal information
- Born: 8 November 1974 (age 50)
- Height: 174 cm (5 ft 9 in)
- Weight: 84.88 kg (187.1 lb)

Sport
- Country: New Zealand
- Sport: Weightlifting
- Weight class: 85 kg
- Team: National team
- Updated on 2 October 2016

James Swann (born 8 November 1974) is a New Zealand male weightlifter, competing in the 85 kg category and representing New Zealand at international competitions. He competed at world championships, most recently at the 1999 World Weightlifting Championships.

== Major results ==
Year	Venue	Weight	Snatch (kg)				Clean & Jerk (kg)				Total	Rank
Year	Venue	Weight	1	2	3	Rank	1	2	3	Rank	Total	Rank
World Championships
1999	Piraeus, Greece	85 kg	140	~~145~~	145	43	170	175	~~180~~	45	320	44
