= Song Jong-shik =

South Korean weightlifter

Personal information
- Full name: Song Jong-Shik
- Born: 9 July 1976 (age 49)
- Height: 170 cm (5 ft 7 in)
- Weight: 84.55 kg (186.4 lb)

Sport
- Country: South Korea
- Sport: Weightlifting
- Weight class: 85 kg
- Team: National team
- Updated on 17 September 2016

Song Jong-shik (Korean: 송종식, born 9 July 1976) is a South Korean male weightlifter, competing in the 85 kg category and representing South Korea at international competitions. He participated at the 2004 Summer Olympics in the 85 kg event. He competed at world championships, most recently at the 2003 World Weightlifting Championships.

== Major results ==
Year	Venue	Weight	Snatch (kg)				Clean & Jerk (kg)				Total	Rank
Year	Venue	Weight	1	2	3	Rank	1	2	3	Rank	Total	Rank
Summer Olympics
2004	Athens, Greece	85 kg				—N/a				—N/a		8
World Championships
2003	Vancouver, Canada	85 kg	~~160~~	160	~~165~~	15	~~205~~	~~205~~	~~205~~	---	0	---
