= Mital Sharipov =

Kyrgyzstani weightlifter

Personal information
- Full name: Mital Baltabayevich Sharipov
- Nationality: Kyrgyzstan
- Born: 13 April 1972 Frunze, Kirghiz SSR
- Died: 28 November 2011 (aged 39)
- Height: 1.74 m (5 ft 8 1/2 in)
- Weight: 85 kg (187 lb)

Sport
- Sport: Weightlifting
- Event: 85 kg

Mital Baltabayevich Sharipov (Russian: Митал Балтабаевич Шарипов; 13 April 1972 – November 2011) was a Kyrgyzstani weightlifter. He was born in Frunze. Sharipov represented Kyrgyzstan at the 2000 Summer Olympics in Sydney, where he competed in the men's light heavyweight class. He successfully lifted 155 kg in the single-motion snatch, and hoisted 190 kg in the two-part, shoulder-to-overhead clean and jerk to deliver a sixteenth-place finish in a field of twenty weightlifters with a total of 345 kg. At the 2004 Summer Olympics in Athens, Sharipov was appointed as the Kyrgyzstani flag bearer in the opening ceremony, but has been immediately excluded by the International Olympic Committee for violations on anti-doping rules.
