= Sergio Mannironi =

Italian weightlifter

Personal information
- Nationality: Italian
- Born: 17 April 1967 (age 57); Rome, Italy

Sport
- Sport: Weightlifting

Sergio Mannironi (born 17 April 1967) is an Italian weightlifter. He competed in the men's light heavyweight event at the 2000 Summer Olympics.
