= Bakhtiyor Nurullaev =

Uzbekistani weightlifter (born 1975)

Personal information
- Full name: Bahtiyor Nurullaev
- Born: 20 January 1975 (age 51)
- Weight: 83.21 kg (183.4 lb)

Sport
- Country: Uzbekistan
- Sport: Weightlifting
- Weight class: 85 kg
- Updated on 2 October 2016

Bahtiyor Nurullaev (born 20 January 1975) is an Uzbekistani male weightlifter, competing in the 85 kg category and representing Uzbekistan at international competitions. He competed at world championships, most recently at the 1999 World Weightlifting Championships. He also competed at the 1996 Summer Olympics and the 2000 Summer Olympics.

== Major results ==
Year	Venue	Weight	Snatch (kg)				Clean & Jerk (kg)				Total	Rank
Year	Venue	Weight	1	2	3	Rank	1	2	3	Rank	Total	Rank
World Championships
1999	Piraeus, Greece	85 kg	150	~~160~~	~~160~~	33	185	190	192.5	19	342.5	29
