= India at the 1998 Commonwealth Games =

- CG code: IND
- CGA: Indian Olympic Association
- Website: olympic.ind.in

in Kuala Lumpur, Malaysia
- Competitors: 54 in 5 sports
- Medals Ranked 8th: Gold 7 Silver 10 Bronze 8 Total 25

Commonwealth Games appearances (overview)
- 1934; 1938; 1950; 1954; 1958; 1962; 1966; 1970; 1974; 1978; 1982; 1986; 1990; 1994; 1998; 2002; 2006; 2010; 2014; 2018; 2022; 2026; 2030

India competed at the 1998 Commonwealth Games held in Kuala Lumpur, Malaysia, from 11 to 21 September 1998. It was the country's twelfth appearance at the Commonwealth Games since making its debut at the 1934 British Empire Games.

The Indian contingent consisted of 54 athletes who competed in five sports. India won a total of 25 medals, comprising seven gold, ten silver, and eight bronze medals, to finish eighth in the overall medal table.

== Medalists ==
India won 25 medals, including seven gold, ten silver, and eight bronze medals, to finish sixth in the overall medal table.

| Medal | Name | Sport | Event |
|---|---|---|---|
| (gold) Gold | Jaspal Rana | Shooting | Men's 25 m centre-fire pistol |
| (gold) Gold | Jaspal Rana; Ashok Pandit | Shooting | Men's 25 m centre-fire pistol – pairs |
| (gold) Gold | Mansher Singh; Manavjit Singh Sandhu | Shooting | Men's Olympic trap – pairs |
| (gold) Gold | Roopa Unnikrishnan | Shooting | Women's 50 m rifle prone |
| (gold) Gold | Dharmaraj Wilson | Weightlifting | 56 kg – clean and jerk |
| (gold) Gold | Arumugam K. Pandian | Weightlifting | 56 kg – combined |
| (gold) Gold | Satheesha Rai | Weightlifting | 77 kg – snatch |
| (silver) Silver | Abhinn Shyam Gupta; George Thomas; Pullela Gopichand; Jaseel Ismail; Marcos Bristow; Nikhil Kanetkar; Vincent Lobo | Badminton | Men's team |
| (silver) Silver | Aparna Popat | Badminton | Women's singles |
| (silver) Silver | Jitender Kumar | Boxing | Middleweight 75 kg |
| (silver) Silver | Jaspal Rana | Shooting | Men's 10 m air pistol |
| (silver) Silver | Jaspal Rana; Satendra Kumar | Shooting | Men's 10 m air pistol – pairs |
| (silver) Silver | Dharmaraj Wilson | Weightlifting | 56 kg – combined |
| (silver) Silver | Arumugam K. Pandian | Weightlifting | 56 kg – snatch |
| (silver) Silver | Arumugam K. Pandian | Weightlifting | 56 kg – clean and jerk |
| (silver) Silver | Satheesha Rai | Weightlifting | 77 kg – clean and jerk |
| (silver) Silver | Satheesha Rai | Weightlifting | 77 kg – combined |
| (bronze) Bronze | Pullela Gopichand | Badminton | Men's singles |
| (bronze) Bronze | Aparna Popat; Archana Deodhar; Deepthi Chapala; Madhumita Bisht; Manjusha Kanwar; K. Neelima Chowdary; P. V. V. Lakshmi | Badminton | Women's team |
| (bronze) Bronze | Bhanwar Dhaka | Shooting | Men's 25 m rapid-fire pistol |
| (bronze) Bronze | Ganapathy Gnanasekar | Weightlifting | 62 kg – snatch |
| (bronze) Bronze | Arun Murugesan | Weightlifting | 62 kg – clean and jerk |
| (bronze) Bronze | Arun Murugesan | Weightlifting | 62 kg – combined |
| (bronze) Bronze | Govindaswamy Vadivelu | Weightlifting | 69 kg – clean and jerk |
| (bronze) Bronze | Sandeep Kumar | Weightlifting | 69 kg – combined |

== Competitors ==
The Indian contingent included 54 athletes competing across five sports.

| Sport | Men | Women | Total |
|---|---|---|---|
| Badminton | 7 | 7 | 14 |
| Boxing | 3 | —N/a | 3 |
| Cricket | 14 | —N/a | 14 |
| Shooting | 10 | 6 | 16 |
| Weightlifting | 7 | —N/a | 7 |
| Total | 41 | 13 | 54 |

== Badminton ==
India won two silver and two bronze medals in badminton at the 1998 Commonwealth Games.

| Athlete | Event | Round of 128 | Round of 64 | Round of 32 | Round of 16 | Quarterfinal | Semifinal | Final | Rank |
| Athlete | Event | Opposition Result | Opposition Result | Opposition Result | Opposition Result | Opposition Result | Opposition Result | Opposition Result | Rank |
|---|---|---|---|---|---|---|---|---|---|
| Pullela Gopichand | Men's singles | Bye | W | W | Beg (PAK); W 15–2, 15–1 | Leung (WAL); W 15–1, 15–6 | Wong (MAS); L 1–15, 11–15 | —N/a | 3rd place, bronze medalist(s) |
| Nikhil Kanetkar | Men's singles | Bye | W | W | Hall (ENG); L 6–15, 15–7, 5–15 | Did not advance | | | |
| Abhinn Shyam Gupta | Men's singles | Bye | W | L | Did not advance | | | | |
| Aparna Popat | Women's singles | —N/a | W | W | Woon (MAS); W 11–2, 11–3 | Ng (MAS); W 11–4, 11–3 | Mann (ENG); W 11–8, 13–11, 13–11 | Morgan (WAL); L 10–13, 5–11 | 2nd place, silver medalist(s) |
| K. Neelima Chowdary | Women's singles | —N/a | W | W | Morgan (WAL); L 3–11, 1–11 | Did not advance | | | |
| Manjusha Kanwar | Women's singles | —N/a | W | W | Gibson (SCO); L 11–13, 3–11 | Did not advance | | | |
| P. V. V. Lakshmi | Women's singles | —N/a | W | L | Did not advance | | | | |
| Marcos Bristow; George Thomas | Men's doubles | —N/a | W | W | W | Archer / Hunt (ENG); L 7–15, 3–15 | Did not advance | | |
| Jaseel Ismail; Vincent Lobo | Men's doubles | —N/a | W | W | W | Robertson / Robertson (ENG); L 3–15, 4–15 | Did not advance | | |
| Archana Deodhar; Manjusha Kanwar | Women's doubles | —N/a | Bye | W | L | Did not advance | | | |
| Madhumita Bisht; P. V. V. Lakshmi | Women's doubles | —N/a | Bye | L | Did not advance | | | | |
| Nikhil Kanetkar; Archana Deodhar | Mixed doubles | —N/a | | W | L | Did not advance | | | |
| Vincent Lobo; Madhumita Bisht | Mixed doubles | —N/a | | L | Did not advance | | | | |

| Athlete | Event | Round-robin | | | Rank |
| Athlete | Event | Opposition Result | Opposition Result | Opposition Result | Rank |
|---|---|---|---|---|---|
| Abhinn Shyam Gupta; George Thomas; Pullela Gopichand; Jaseel Ismail; Marcos Bristow; Nikhil Kanetkar; Vincent Lobo | Men's team | Malaysia; L 1–4 | England; W 3–2 | New Zealand; W 4–1 | 2nd place, silver medalist(s) |
| Aparna Popat; Archana Deodhar; Deepthi Chapala; Madhumita Bisht; Manjusha Kanwar; K. Neelima Chowdary; P. V. V. Lakshmi | Women's team | Malaysia; L 2–3 | Australia; W 4–1 | England; W 3–2 | 3rd place, bronze medalist(s) |

== Boxing ==
India competed in three boxing events at the 1998 Commonwealth Games. Jitender Kumar won the silver medal in the middleweight division.

| Athlete | Event | Preliminary | Quarterfinal | Semifinal | Final | Rank |
| Athlete | Event | Opposition Result | Opposition Result | Opposition Result | Opposition Result | Rank |
|---|---|---|---|---|---|---|
| Gurmeet Singh | Featherweight 57 kg | Swan (AUS); L 7:17 | Did not advance | | | |
| Jitender Kumar | Middleweight 75 kg | Partsch (SAM); W 13:3 | Adipo (KEN); W 29:15 | Stewardson (CAN); W 21:10 | Pearce (ENG); L 11:25 | 2nd place, silver medalist(s) |
| Gurucharan Singh | Light-heavyweight 81 kg | Bye | Ross (CAN); L 7:11 | Did not advance | | |

Legend

- W – Win; L – Loss;

== Cricket ==
India named the below squad for the tournament.

Roster

- Ajay Jadeja (c)
- Anil Kumble (vc)
- Nikhil Chopra
- Rohan Gavaskar
- Harbhajan Singh
- Gagan Khoda
- Amay Khurasiya
- VVS Laxman
- Paras Mhambrey
- Debashish Mohanty
- M. S. K. Prasad (wk)
- Rahul Sanghvi
- Robin Singh
- Sachin Tendulkar

Summary

| Team | Event | Group stage | | | | Semifinal | Final / BM | |
| Team | Event | Opposition Result | Opposition Result | Opposition Result | Rank | Opposition Result | Opposition Result | Rank |
|---|---|---|---|---|---|---|---|---|
| India men | Men's tournament | Antigua and Barbuda; No result | Canada; W by 112 runs | Australia; L by 146 runs | 3 | Did not advance | | 9 |

Group stage

Group B
| Pos | Team | Pld | W | L | T | NR | Pts | NRR |
|---|---|---|---|---|---|---|---|---|
| 1 | Australia | 3 | 3 | 0 | 0 | 0 | 6 | 3.299 |
| 2 | Antigua and Barbuda | 3 | 1 | 1 | 0 | 1 | 3 | 0.079 |
| 3 | India | 3 | 1 | 1 | 0 | 1 | 3 | −0.340 |
| 4 | Canada | 3 | 0 | 3 | 0 | 0 | 0 | −2.558 |

Source: ESPNcricinfo

9 September 1998
10:00
Scorecard

| Antigua and Barbuda; 164/9 (41 overs) | v | India; 30/2 (9.4 overs) |
| Ridley Jacobs 43* (70); Anil Kumble 3/28 (8 overs) | | Sachin Tendulkar 15 (10); Eldine Baptiste 1/4 (1 over) |

No result
Tenaga National Sports Complex, Kuala Lumpur
Umpires: Javed Akhtar (Pak) and K. T. Francis (SL)

- Antigua and Barbuda won the toss and elected to bat.
- The match was reduced before play started to 41 overs per side due to overnight rain. Rain prevented any further play after 9.4 overs were bowled in the second innings.
- Wilden Cornwall and Ian Tittle (Ant) both made their List A debut.
- Robin Singh (Ind) took his 100th List A wicket.
- Points: Antigua and Barbuda 1, India 1.

12 September 1998
10:00
Scorecard

| India; 157/9 (50 overs) | v | Canada; 45 (23.5 overs) |
| Amay Khurasiya 83 (136); Davis Joseph 2/18 (8 overs) | | Joseph Harris 13 (20); Anil Kumble 4/11 (6.5 overs) |

India won by 112 runs
Victoria Institution, Kuala Lumpur
Umpires: Ismail Khan (Mas) and Steve Bucknor (Jam)

- Canada won the toss and elected to field.
- Points: India 2, Canada 0.
- Canada were eliminated as a result of this match.

15 September 1998
10:00
Scorecard

| Australia; 255/5 (50 overs) | v | India; 109 (37.2 overs) |
| Steve Waugh 100* (102); Debashish Mohanty 3/50 (10 overs) | | Ajay Jadeja 27 (40); Brad Young 4/23 (8.2 overs) |

Australia won by 146 runs
Perbadanan Kemajuan Negeri Selangor Sports Complex, Petaling Jaya
Umpires: Javed Akhtar (Pak) and Russell Tiffin (Zim)

- India won the toss and elected to field.
- Amay Khurasiya was removed in stretcher after he collapsed due to dehydration while fielding. Rohan Gavaskar substituted for him. He couldn't bat during the Indian innings.
- Points: Australia 2, India 0.
- Australia qualified for the semi-finals and India were eliminated as a result of this match.

== Shooting ==
India competed in 23 shooting events at the 1998 Commonwealth Games. Indian shooters won four gold medals, two silver medals and one bronze medal.

| Athlete | Event | Preliminary | | Final | |
| Athlete | Event | Points | Rank | Points | Rank |
|---|---|---|---|---|---|
| Jaspal Rana | Men's centre-fire pistol | | Q | 581 | 1st place, gold medalist(s) |
| Ashok Pandit | Men's centre-fire pistol | | Q | 574 | 6 |
| Jaspal Rana; Ashok Pandit | Men's centre-fire pistol – pairs | —N/a | | 1154 | 1st place, gold medalist(s) |
| Bhanwar Lal Dhaka | Men's rapid-fire pistol | | Q | 668.9 | 3rd place, bronze medalist(s) |
| Ajab Rao | Men's rapid-fire pistol | 551 | 15 | Did not advance | |
| Bhanwar Lal Dhaka; Ajab Rao | Men's 25 m rapid-fire pistol – pairs | —N/a | | 1121 | 4 |
| Jaspal Rana | Men's 10 m air pistol | | Q | 677.4 | 2nd place, silver medalist(s) |
| Satendra Kumar | Men's 10 m air pistol | | Q | 668.7 | 5 |
| Jaspal Rana; Satendra Kumar | Men's 10 m air pistol – pairs | —N/a | | 1143 | 2nd place, silver medalist(s) |
| Sushma Rana | Women's 10 m air pistol | | Q | 470.9 | 5 |
| Shilpi Singh | Women's 10 m air pistol | | Q | 468.7 | 6 |
| Sushma Rana; Shilpi Singh | Women's 10 m air pistol – pairs | —N/a | | 733 | 6 |
| Samaresh Jung | Men's 50 m free pistol | 535 | 11 | Did not advance | |
| Satendra Kumar | Men's 50 m free pistol | | Q | 639.9 | 4 |
| Samaresh Jung; Satendra Kumar | Men's 50 m free pistol – pairs | —N/a | | 1062 | 5 |
| Abhinav Bindra | Men's 10 m air rifle | 571 | 16 | Did not advance | |
| Anuja Tere | Women's 10 m air rifle | | Q | 485.2 | 7 |
| Anjali Bhagwat | Women's 10 m air rifle | 383 | 12 | Did not advance | |
| Anuja Tere; Anjali Bhagwat | Women's 10 m air rifle – pairs | —N/a | | 765 | 5 |
| T. C. Palangappa | Men's 50 m rifle prone | 573 | 34 | Did not advance | |
| A. P. Subbiah | Men's 50 m rifle prone | 588 | 15 | Did not advance | |
| T. C. Palangappa; A. P. Subbiah | Men's 50 m rifle prone – pairs | —N/a | | 1160 | 12 |
| Kuheli Gangulee | Women's 50 m rifle prone | 576 | 19 | Did not advance | |
| Roopa Unnikrishnan | Women's 50 m rifle prone | | Q | 590 GR | 1st place, gold medalist(s) |
| Kuheli Gangulee; Roopa Unnikrishnan | Women's 50 m rifle prone – pairs | —N/a | | 1170 | 4 |
| T. C. Palangappa | Men's 50 m rifle three positions | 1098 | 20 | Did not advance | |
| A. P. Subbiah | Men's 50 m rifle three positions | 1113 | 14 | Did not advance | |
| T. C. Palangappa; A. P. Subbiah | Men's 50 m rifle three positions – pairs | —N/a | | 2221 | 8 |
| Roopa Unnikrishnan | Women's 50 m rifle three positions | 554 | 11 | Did not advance | |
| Anjali Bhagwat | Women's 50 m rifle three positions | 549 | 17 | Did not advance | |
| Roopa Unnikrishnan; Anjali Bhagwat | Women's 50 m rifle three positions – pairs | —N/a | | 1106 | 7 |
| Mansher Singh | Men's Olympic trap | 117 | 9 | Did not advance | |
| Manavjit Singh Sandhu | Men's Olympic trap | | Q | 140 | 5 |
| Mansher Singh; Manavjit Singh Sandhu | Men's Olympic trap – pairs | —N/a | | 192 GR | 1st place, gold medalist(s) |

Legend

- Q – Qualified for the next round

== Weightlifting ==
Seven Indians competed in four weightlifting events at the 1998 Commonwealth Games. Indian weightlifters won 13 medals, including three gold medals.

| Athlete | Event | Snatch | | Clean & jerk | | Overall | |
| Athlete | Event | Result | Rank | Result | Rank | Result | Rank |
|---|---|---|---|---|---|---|---|
| Arumugam K. Pandian | 56 kg | 107.5 kg | 2nd place, silver medalist(s) | 137.5 kg | 2nd place, silver medalist(s) | 245.0 kg | 1st place, gold medalist(s) |
| Dharmaraj Wilson | 56 kg | 102.5 kg | 4 | 140.0 kg | 2nd place, silver medalist(s) | 242.5 kg | 1st place, gold medalist(s) |
| Arun Murugesan | 62 kg | 117.5 kg | 4 | 155.0 kg | 3rd place, bronze medalist(s) | 272.5 kg | 3rd place, bronze medalist(s) |
| Ganapathy Gnanasekar | 62 kg | 117.5 kg | 3rd place, bronze medalist(s) | 145.0 kg | 4 | 262.5 kg | 4 |
| Sandeep Kumar | 69 kg | 125.0 kg | 4 | 160.0 kg | 4 | 285.0 kg | 3rd place, bronze medalist(s) |
| Govindaswamy Vadivelu | 69 kg | 115.5 kg | 8 | 162.0 kg | 3rd place, bronze medalist(s) | 277.5 kg | 6 |
| Satheesha Rai | 77 kg | 147.5 kg GR | 1st place, gold medalist(s) | 175.0 kg | 2nd place, silver medalist(s) | 322.5 kg | 2nd place, silver medalist(s) |
