= South Asian Badminton Championships =

Badminton championships

The South Asian Badminton Championships are a series of badminton tournaments organized by the Badminton Asia governing body to crown the best senior and junior badminton players in South Asia.

== History ==
The first unofficial edition of the South Asian Badminton Championships (then the SAARC Badminton Championships) took place in December 1985 soon after the formation of the South Asian Association for Regional Cooperation. The tournament only became official in 1988 when it was hosted in Hyderabad, India.

The second edition of the championships were scheduled to be hosted in April 1990 in Kathmandu. However, the tournament was scrapped and Colombo was chosen to be the host city for the second edition of the tournament in 1992. The tournament continued for two more editions until it was scrapped in 1998.

The championships were later revived in 2017, with India hosting the first ever South Asian Junior Championships in Guwahati. In 2019, the Maldives hosted the first South Asian senior tournament since 1997 in Addu City. The U–17 and U–15 competitions were later added in 2023, with Nepal hosting the tournament for both age groups in Kathmandu.

== Championships (U–23) ==
Year	Edition	Host city	Host country	Events
1988	1	Hyderabad (1)	India (1)	7
1990	~~2~~	~~Kathmandu~~	~~Nepal~~	7
1992	2	Colombo (1)	Sri Lanka (1)	7
1996	3	Vijayawada (2)	India (2)	7
1997	4	Colombo (2)	Sri Lanka (2)	7
2019	5	Addu City (1)	Maldives (1)	6
2025	6	Thimphu (1)	Bhutan (1)	6
2026	7	Islamabad (1)	Pakistan (1)	6

=== Previous winners ===
==== Individual competition ====
Year	Men's singles	Women's singles	Men's doubles	Women's doubles	Mixed doubles
1988	(India) U. Vimal Kumar	(India) Seema Bhandari	(India) Prakash Padukone (India) Uday Pawar	(India) Madhumita Bisht (India) Sudha Padmanabhan	(India) Uday Pawar (India) Madhumita Bisht
1992	(India) Rajeev Bagga	(India) Madhumita Bisht	(India) U. Vinod Kumar (India) Uday Pawar	(India) Archana Deodhar (India) Manjusha Pavangadkar	(India) Harjeet Singh (India) Madhumita Bisht
1996	(India) Pullela Gopichand	(India) P. V. V. Lakshmi	(India) Jaseel P. Ismail (India) Vijaydeep Singh	(India) P. V. V. Lakshmi (India) P. V. Sharada	(India) Jaseel P. Ismail (India) Manjusha Pavangadkar
1997	(India) Pullela Gopichand	(India) P. V. V. Lakshmi	(India) Jaseel P. Ismail (India) Vijaydeep Singh	(India) Madhumita Bisht (India) P. V. V. Lakshmi	(India) U. Vinod Kumar (India) Madhumita Bisht
2019	(India) Sarath Dunna	(India) Deepshikha Singh	(Pakistan) Muhammad Adnan (Pakistan) Raja Zulqarnain Haider	(Sri Lanka) Nayanathara Teshani (Sri Lanka) Hasara Wijayarathne	(India) Sai Charan Koya (India) Mansi Singh
2025	(Sri Lanka) Viren Nettasinghe	(Sri Lanka) Ranithma Liyanage	(Sri Lanka) Dumindu Abeywickrama (Sri Lanka) Viren Nettasinghe	(Sri Lanka) Ranithma Liyanage (Sri Lanka) Rashmi Mudalige	(Sri Lanka) Viren Nettasinghe (Sri Lanka) Ranithma Liyanage
2026	(Nepal) Prince Dahal	(Pakistan) Alja Tariq	(Bangladesh) Md. Nazmul Islam Joy (Bangladesh) S. S. M. Sifat Ullah	(Pakistan) Ammarah Ishtiaq (Pakistan) Umama Usman	(Nepal) Prince Dahal (Nepal) Rasila Maharjan

==== Team competition (1988–1997) ====
Year	Men	Women
1988	India	India
1992	India	India
1992	India	India
1997	India	India

==== Team competition (2025–) ====
Year	Mixed
2019	India
2025	Sri Lanka
2026	Pakistan

== Junior championships (U–19, U–18) ==
=== Location of the South Asian Junior Championships (U–19, U–18) ===
The table below gives an overview of all host cities and countries of the South Asian Junior Championships.

Year	Edition	Host city	Host country	Events
2017	1	Guwahati (1)	India (1)	6
2026	2	Islamabad (1)	Pakistan (1)	5

=== Previous winners ===
==== Individual competition ====
Year	Men's singles	Women's singles	Men's doubles	Women's doubles	Mixed doubles
2017	(India) Aryamann Tandon	(India) Ashmita Chaliha	(India) Arintap Dasgupta (India) Krishna Prasad Garaga	(India) Ashmita Chaliha (India) Mithula Umakant	(India) Krishna Prasad Garaga (India) Mithula Umakant
2026	(Pakistan) Muhammad Umer	(Pakistan) Roshanay Ihsan	(Pakistan) Fahad Ahmad (Pakistan) Muhammad Umer	(Pakistan) Roshanay Ihsan (Pakistan) Samha Naveed	(Pakistan) Fahad Ahmad (Pakistan) Shukriya Ibrahim

==== Team competition ====
Year	Mixed
2017	India
2026	Not held

== Youth Championships (U–17 & U–15) ==
=== Location of the South Asian Youth Championships (U–17 & U–15) ===
The table below gives an overview of all host cities and countries of the South Asian U–17 and U–15 Junior Championships.

Year	Edition	Host city	Host country	Events
2022	1	Guwahati (1)	India (1)	12
2023	2	Kathmandu (1)	Nepal (1)	12
2024	3	Islamabad (1)	Pakistan (1)	12
2025	4	Thimphu (1)	Bhutan (1)	12
2026	5	Islamabad (2)	Pakistan (2)	5

=== Previous winners ===
==== Individual competition U–17 ====
Year	Men's singles	Women's singles	Men's doubles	Women's doubles	Mixed doubles
2022	(India) Pranay Shettigar	(India) Rujula Ramu	(India) Sanskar Saraswat (India) Pranay Shettigar	(India) Aishani Tiwari (India) Rujula Ramu	(India) Sanskar Saraswat (India) Aishani Tiwari
2023	(Bangladesh) S. S. M Sifat Ullah	(Sri Lanka) Ranithma Liyanage	(Bangladesh) Rajon Mia (Bangladesh) S. S. M Sifat Ullah	(Sri Lanka) Ranumi Manage (Sri Lanka) Ranithma Liyanage	(Sri Lanka) Thidasa Weragoda (Sri Lanka) Ranithma Liyanage
2024	(Sri Lanka) Thejana Herath	(Sri Lanka) Nethmi Ratnayake	(Pakistan) Fahad Ahmad (Pakistan) Khuzaima Shahzad	(Sri Lanka) Luckshana Kumar (Sri Lanka) Nethmi Ratnayake	(Sri Lanka) Mihila Jayaweera (Sri Lanka) Nethmi Ratnayake
2025	(Sri Lanka) Senuth Sethmitha Perera	(Sri Lanka) Nethmi Ratnayake	(Sri Lanka) Kenneth Aruggoda (Sri Lanka) Senuth Sethmitha Perera	(Sri Lanka) Nethmi Ratnayake (Sri Lanka) Vishwanie Wanniarachchi	(Sri Lanka) Kenneth Aruggoda (Sri Lanka) Nethmi Ratnayake
2026	(Pakistan) Samiullah Hashmi	(Pakistan) Sarwat Fatima	(Pakistan) Samiullah Hashmi (Pakistan) Danish Mehboob	(Pakistan) Romysa Faisal (Pakistan) Sarwat Fatima	(Pakistan) Samiullah Hashmi (Pakistan) Sarwat Fatima

==== Individual competition U–15 ====
Year	Men's singles	Women's singles	Men's doubles	Women's doubles	Mixed doubles
2022	(India) Prateek Koundilya	(India) Tanvi Reddy Andluri	(Bangladesh) Mostakim Hossain (Bangladesh) S. S. M Sifat Ullah	(India) Tanvi Reddy Andluri (India) Naishaa Kaur Bhatoye	(India) Abhinav Garg (India) Tanvi Reddy Andluri
2023	(Bangladesh) Wali Ullah	(Sri Lanka) Nethmi Ratnayake	(Sri Lanka) Kenneth Aruggoda (Sri Lanka) Senuth Sethmitha Perera	(Sri Lanka) Sithuli Ranasinghe (Sri Lanka) Nethmi Ratnayake	(Sri Lanka) Senuth Sethmitha Perera (Sri Lanka) Nethmi Ratnayake
2024	(Sri Lanka) Amavan Amarasinghe	(Sri Lanka) Benuri Jananga Vidyathilaka	(Sri Lanka) Amavan Amarasinghe (Sri Lanka) Chenal Dewshan Madapathage	(Sri Lanka) Thenuki Ayanth de Silva (Sri Lanka) Benuri Jananga Vidyathilaka	(Sri Lanka) Amavan Amarasinghe (Sri Lanka) Thenuki Ayanth de Silva
2025	(Nepal) Sudesh Rajkoti	(Sri Lanka) Nithini Kotuwegoda	(Sri Lanka) Thamindu Fernando (Sri Lanka) Ranithu Premarathne	(Sri Lanka) Limandi Gajali (Sri Lanka) Nithini Kotuwegoda	(Sri Lanka) Thamindu Fernando (Sri Lanka) Ranithu Premarathne
2026	Not held				

==== Team competition U–17 ====
Year	Mixed
2022	India
2023	Sri Lanka
2024	Sri Lanka
2025	Sri Lanka

==== Team competition U–15 ====
Year	Mixed
2022	India
2023	Sri Lanka
2024	Sri Lanka
2025	Sri Lanka

== See also ==
- Badminton Asia Championships
