= 1999 IBF World Championships – Women's doubles =

Women's doubles at the 1999 IBF World Championships
- Venue: Brøndby Arena
- Location: Copenhagen, Denmark
- Dates: May 16, 1999 – May 23, 1999

Medalists
gold medal	Ge Fei; Gu Jun	China
silver medal	Ra Kyung-min; Chung Jae-hee	South Korea
bronze medal	Qin Yiyuan; Gao Ling	China
bronze medal	Ann Jørgensen; Majken Vange	Denmark

The 1999 IBF World Championships (World Badminton Championships) were held in Copenhagen, Denmark, between 10 May and 23 May 1999. Following the results of the women's doubles.

== Qualification ==
=== First round ===
- (Iceland) Sara Jónsdóttir / Ólöf Ólafsdóttir - (Iraq) Lubna Abdel Razzak / Huda Said: w.o.
- (Finland) Malin Virta / Marjaana Moilanen - (Hungary) Krisztina Ádám / Csilla Fórián: 15:7, 17:14
- (Canada) Elma Ong / Moira Ong - (United States) Lily Chen / Yeping Tang: w.o.
- (South Africa) Linda Montignies / Monique Ric-Hansen - (Kazakhstan) Olga Gafarova / Irina Gritsenko: w.o.

=== Second round ===
- (Iceland) Sara Jónsdóttir / Ólöf Ólafsdóttir - (Nigeria) Olamide Toyin Adebayo / Prisca Azuine
- (Finland) Malin Virta / Marjaana Moilanen - (Zambia) Megan Chungu / Charity Mwape
- (India) Archana Deodhar / Manjusha Kanwar - (Canada) Elma Ong / Moira Ong
- (South Africa) Linda Montignies / Monique Ric-Hansen - (Nigeria) Gloria Emina / Kuburat Mumini
- (Belarus) Tatiana Gerassimovitch / Vlada Tcherniavskaia - (Argentina) Lorena Bugallo Castro / Alice Garay
- (Iceland) Erla Björg Hafsteinsdóttir / Drífa Harðardóttir - (Norway) Helene Abusdal / Monica Halvorsen
- (Russia) Svetlana Alferova / Marina Yakusheva - (India) Neelima K. Choudhary / P. V. V. Lakshmi
- (Estonia) Piret Hamer / Kairi Saks - (Belarus) Maria Kizil / Nadieżda Kostiuczyk

== Main stage ==
=== Section 1 ===
First round
(China) Huang Nanyan (China) Yang Wei	15	15
(Germany) Katja Michalowsky (Germany) Karen Neumann	1	3
(Japan) Naomi Murakami (Japan) Hiromi Yamada	o.K.
(Brazil) Fernanda Kumasaka (Brazil) Cristina Nakano
(Indonesia) Etty Tantri (Indonesia) Cynthia Tuwankotta	o.K.
(Latvia) Margarita Miķelsone (Latvia) Kristīne Šefere
(Poland) Kamila Augustyn (Poland) Kinga Rudolf	15	8	15
(Slovenia) Maja Pohar (Slovenia) Maja Tvrdy	6	15	11
(Denmark) Pernille Harder (Denmark) Helene Kirkegaard	15	15
(Bulgaria) Petya Nedeltcheva (Bulgaria) Rayna Tzvetkova	11	6
(England) Lorraine Cole (England) Tracy Dineen	11	12
(Iceland) Erla Björg Hafsteinsdóttir (Iceland) Drífa Harðardóttir	15	15
(South Korea) Chung Jae-hee (South Korea) Ra Kyung-min	15	15
(Ukraine) Natalja Esipenko (Ukraine) Natalia Golovkina	2	3
(Finland) Nina Weckström (Finland) Anu Weckström	o.K.
(South Africa) Meagen Burnett (Lithuania) Erika Milikauskaite

Second round
(China) Huang Nanyan (China) Yang Wei	15	15
(Japan) Naomi Murakami (Japan) Hiromi Yamada	9	4
(Indonesia) Etty Tantri (Indonesia) Cynthia Tuwankotta	15	12	15
(Poland) Kamila Augustyn (Poland) Kinga Rudolf	4	15	5
(Denmark) Pernille Harder (Denmark) Helene Kirkegaard	15	15
(Iceland) Erla Björg Hafsteinsdóttir (Iceland) Drífa Harðardóttir	0	7
(South Korea) Chung Jae-hee (South Korea) Ra Kyung-min	15	15
(Finland) Nina Weckström (Finland) Anu Weckström	0	1

Third round
(China) Huang Nanyan (China) Yang Wei	15	15
(Indonesia) Etty Tantri (Indonesia) Cynthia Tuwankotta	10	6
(Denmark) Pernille Harder (Denmark) Helene Kirkegaard	8	5
(South Korea) Chung Jae-hee (South Korea) Ra Kyung-min	15	15

Quarter finals
(China) Huang Nanyan (China) Yang Wei	15	12	13
(South Korea) Chung Jae-hee (South Korea) Ra Kyung-min	5	15	15

=== Section 2 ===
First round
(Denmark) Ann Jørgensen (Denmark) Majken Vange	15	15
(Hungary) Andrea Dakó (Hungary) Andrea Ódor	3	2
(Malaysia) Lim Pek Siah (Malaysia) Joanne Quay	15	15
(United States) Lily Chen (United States) Yeping Tang	5	5
(Netherlands) Lonneke Janssen (Netherlands) Erica van den Heuvel	15	15
(Mauritius) Amrita Sawaram (Brazil) Min Huai Hao	2	2
(Czech Republic) Ludmila Bášová (Czech Republic) Markéta Koudelková	15	15
(Mauritius) Selvon Marudamuthu (Mauritius) Marie-Hélène Valérie-Pierre	2	6
(China) Huang Sui (China) Lu Ying	15	15
(Taiwan) Chen Li-Chin (Taiwan) Tsai Hui-Min	1	1
(Switzerland) Judith Baumeyer (Switzerland) Santi Wibowo	12	5
(Finland) Marjaana Moilanen (Finland) Malin Virta	15	15
(England) Joanne Goode (England) Donna Kellogg	15	15
(Mexico) Veronica Estrada (Mexico) Gabriela Melgoza	1	0
(Norway) Sissel Linderoth (Norway) Camilla Wright	17	15
(Estonia) Piret Hamer (Estonia) Kairi Saks	15	6

Second round
(Denmark) Ann Jørgensen (Denmark) Majken Vange	15	15
(Malaysia) Lim Pek Siah (Malaysia) Joanne Quay	6	5
(Netherlands) Lonneke Janssen (Netherlands) Erica van den Heuvel	15	15
(Czech Republic) Ludmila Bášová (Czech Republic) Markéta Koudelková	9	7
(China) Huang Sui (China) Lu Ying	15	15
(Finland) Marjaana Moilanen (Finland) Malin Virta	1	4
(England) Joanne Goode (England) Donna Kellogg	15	15
(Norway) Sissel Linderoth (Norway) Camilla Wright	0	7

Third round
(Denmark) Ann Jørgensen (Denmark) Majken Vange	15	15
(Netherlands) Lonneke Janssen (Netherlands) Erica van den Heuvel	5	4
(China) Huang Sui (China) Lu Ying	15	4	2
(England) Joanne Goode (England) Donna Kellogg	7	15	15

Quarter finals
(Denmark) Ann Jørgensen (Denmark) Majken Vange	15	15	15
(England) Joanne Goode (England) Donna Kellogg	17	10	3

=== Section 3 ===
First round
(Canada) Denyse Julien (Canada) Charmaine Reid	15	15
(India) Archana Deodhar (India) Manjusha Kanwar	5	9
(England) Joanne Davies (England) Sarah Hardaker	15	15
(South Africa) Linda Montignies (South Africa) Monique Ric-Hansen	11	5
(Germany) Nicol Pitro (Germany) Anika Sietz	15	15
(Peru) Ximena Bellido (Peru) Doriana Rivera	1	10
(China) Gao Ling (China) Qin Yiyuan	15	15
(Kazakhstan) Olga Gafarova (Kazakhstan) Irina Gritsenko	2	0
(Bulgaria) Neli Boteva (Bulgaria) Diana Koleva	15	15
(Hong Kong) Chan Mei Mei (Hong Kong) Koon Wai Chee	13	12
(Russia) Svetlana Alferova (Russia) Marina Yakusheva	12	5
(Japan) Yoshiko Iwata (Japan) Haruko Matsuda	15	15
(Poland) Monika Bienkowska (Poland) Joanna Szleszynska	15	15
(Iceland) Vigdís Ásgeirsdóttir (Iceland) Brynja Pétursdóttir	6	8
(Denmark) Rikke Olsen (Denmark) Mette Sørensen	15	15
(South Korea) Jun Woul-sik (South Korea) Lee Hyo-jung	3	6

Second round
(Canada) Denyse Julien (Canada) Charmaine Reid	2	7
(England) Joanne Davies (England) Sarah Hardaker	15	15
(Germany) Nicol Pitro (Germany) Anika Sietz	5	5
(China) Gao Ling (China) Qin Yiyuan	15	15
(Bulgaria) Neli Boteva (Bulgaria) Diana Koleva	8	2
(Japan) Yoshiko Iwata (Japan) Haruko Matsuda	15	15
(Poland) Monika Bienkowska (Poland) Joanna Szleszynska	8	0
(Denmark) Rikke Olsen (Denmark) Mette Sørensen	15	15

Third round
(England) Joanne Davies (England) Sarah Hardaker	6	2
(China) Gao Ling (China) Qin Yiyuan	15	15
(Japan) Yoshiko Iwata (Japan) Haruko Matsuda	13	5
(Denmark) Rikke Olsen (Denmark) Mette Sørensen	15	15

Quarter finals
(China) Gao Ling (China) Qin Yiyuan	15	15
(Denmark) Rikke Olsen (Denmark) Mette Sørensen	8	9

=== Section 4 ===
First round
(France) Amélie Decelle (France) Christelle Szynal	15	15
(Mexico) Gabriella Rodriguez (Mexico) Aurora Salazar	6	3
(Netherlands) Lotte Jonathans (Netherlands) Nicole van Hooren	15	15
(Denmark) Ann-Lou Jørgensen (Denmark) Mette Schjoldager	8	10
(Malaysia) Ang Li Peng (Malaysia) Woon Sze Mei	15	15
(Iceland) Sara Jónsdóttir (Iceland) Ólöf Ólafsdóttir	2	4
(Indonesia) Carmelita (Indonesia) Indarti Issolina	15	15
(Slovakia) Barbora Bobrovská (Slovakia) Kvetoslava Orlovská	4	1
(Belarus) Maria Kizil (Belarus) Nadieżda Kostiuczyk	17	15	15
(Portugal) Ana Ferreira (Portugal) Filipa Lamy	17	12	4
(Belarus) Tatiana Gerassimovitch (Belarus) Vlada Tcherniavskaia	6	10
(Thailand) Sujitra Ekmongkolpaisarn (Thailand) Saralee Thungthongkam	15	15
(Ukraine) Victoria Evtoushenko (Ukraine) Elena Nozdran	15	4	15
(South Korea) Jun Jae-youn (South Korea) Si Jin-sun	7	15	9
(China) Ge Fei (China) Gu Jun	15	15
(Portugal) Helena Berimbau (Scotland) Fiona Sneddon	0	2

Second round
(France) Amélie Decelle (France) Christelle Szynal	1	6
(Netherlands) Lotte Jonathans (Netherlands) Nicole van Hooren	15	15
(Malaysia) Ang Li Peng (Malaysia) Woon Sze Mei	0	11
(Indonesia) Carmelita (Indonesia) Indarti Issolina	15	15
(Belarus) Maria Kizil (Belarus) Nadieżda Kostiuczyk	13	9
(Thailand) Sujitra Ekmongkolpaisarn (Thailand) Saralee Thungthongkam	15	15
(Ukraine) Victoria Evtoushenko (Ukraine) Elena Nozdran	0	0
(China) Ge Fei (China) Gu Jun	15	15

Third round
(Netherlands) Lotte Jonathans (Netherlands) Nicole van Hooren	11	15	15
(Indonesia) Carmelita (Indonesia) Indarti Issolina	15	6	3
(Thailand) Sujitra Ekmongkolpaisarn (Thailand) Saralee Thungthongkam	6	3
(China) Ge Fei (China) Gu Jun	15	15

Quarter finals
(Netherlands) Lotte Jonathans (Netherlands) Nicole van Hooren	8	4
(China) Ge Fei (China) Gu Jun	15	15

== Final stage ==
Quarterfinals
(South Korea) Chung Jae-hee (South Korea) Ra Kyung-min	5	15	15
(China) Huang Nanyan (China) Yang Wei	15	12	13
4	(Denmark) Ann Jørgensen (Denmark) Majken Vange	15	15	15
(England) Joanne Goode (England) Donna Kellogg	17	10	3
(Denmark) Rikke Olsen (Denmark) Mette Sørensen	8	9
5	(China) Gao Ling (China) Qin Yiyuan	15	15
(Netherlands) Lotte Jonathans (Netherlands) Nicole van Hooren	8	4
2	(China) Ge Fei (China) Gu Jun	15	15

Semifinals
(South Korea) Chung Jae-hee (South Korea) Ra Kyung-min	15	7	15
4	(Denmark) Ann Jørgensen (Denmark) Majken Vange	10	15	10
5	(China) Gao Ling (China) Qin Yiyuan	6	7
2	(China) Ge Fei (China) Gu Jun	15	15

Finals
(South Korea) Chung Jae-hee (South Korea) Ra Kyung-min	4	5
2	(China) Ge Fei (China) Gu Jun	15	15
