= Priya Kumar =

Indian writer and motivational speaker (born 1974)

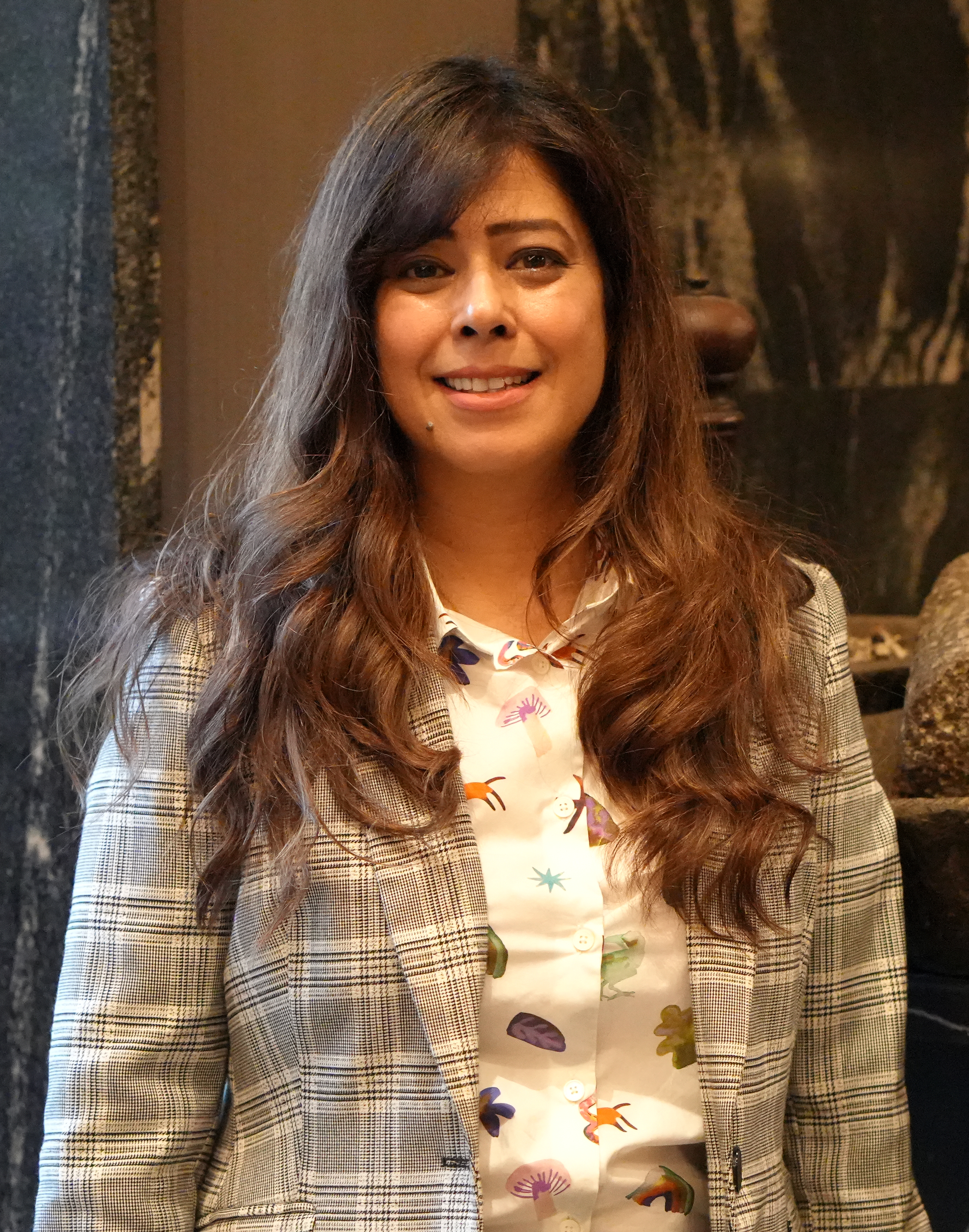
- Priya Kumar in 2024, Mumbai
- Born: 4 March 1974 (age 52); Chandigarh, India
- Education: St. Kabir Public School; University of Bombay
- Occupations: Writer, motivational speaker
- Writing career
- Notable work: I Will Go with You (2015)
- Website: priya-kumar.com

Priya Kumar (born 4 March 1974) is an Indian motivational speaker and writer. She is the author of 19 books, including novels, self-help books and biographies of Indian business leaders, and is often described in Indian media as a "biography specialist". Her works mainly deal with inspirational and spiritual themes. Her books have received 47 international book awards. Her book License to Live (2010) was nominated for the Vodafone Crossword Book Award in 2010. In 2019, her novel I Will Go with You (2015) was adapted into the web television series The Final Call, starring Arjun Rampal, Sakshi Tanwar and Javed Jaffrey. Streaming on ZEE5.

== Early life ==
Priya Kumar was born on 4 March 1974 in Chandigarh, India. She was schooled at St. Kabir Public School, Chandigarh, and graduated in economics from the University of Bombay. She holds a master's degree in psychotherapy and counselling, and later completed a post-graduate programme in marketing and sales from NMIMS University. She began her career as a motivational speaker at the age of 22.

== Career ==
Kumar has worked as a corporate trainer and motivational speaker for over three decades, and is India's first certified firewalk instructor. She is the founder of Priya Kumar's Training Systems, the publishing imprint Books That Inspire, the production house Firelight Films. In 2017 she received the Times of India Speaking Tree Good Karma Award for India's best inspirational author. In a 2025 interview, Kumar said she writes in three genres – fiction, non-fiction and biography – and described biography as her favourite form.

=== Writing ===
In 2010, she published her first book, License to Live: A Seeker's Journey to Greatness, a self-help book with a spiritual theme that she described as an "inspiration thriller" and "spiritual fiction". It is a collection of fictionalised fables with first-person narration.

Her next book, I Am Another You: A Journey to Powerful Breakthroughs, was published the same year and became a bestseller. It deals with themes such as self-realization and shamanism, narrating Kumar's experiences with a shamanic group in the Netherlands.

In 2011, she published the novel The Perfect World: A Journey to Infinite Possibilities.

Thinking Aloud: A Collection of Original Inspirational Quotes (2013) is a collection of her inspirational anecdotes, stories and quotations.

In 2014, she wrote a biography of Om Prakash Munjal, founder of Hero Cycles, under the title The Inspiring Journey of a Hero. Written in the style of a self-help book, it narrates Munjal's life with a motivational approach, covering his early life, the partition and the building of his bicycle company. It was published by Penguin Books in 2014. Alice McDermott in the Sunday Tribune and P. P. Ramachandran in The Free Press Journal praised the biography for its inspirational portrayal of Munjal. It was translated into Hindi as Ek Super Hero Ki Shandaar Kahani (2015).

In 2015, Kumar published a biography of Subhasish Chakraborty, founder of DTDC, titled Dream Dare Deliver: The Inspirational Journey of Subhasish Chakraborty and the Making of DTDC (Embassy Books).

Also in 2015, she published the suspense thriller I Will Go with You: The Flight of a Lifetime. The plot follows an airline pilot who decides to end his life while on board and, rather than die alone, endangers the 300 passengers on his flight. It deals with themes of the afterlife, karma, mortality and spirituality. The novel became a bestseller and was adapted into the 2019 web series The Final Call on ZEE5. In April 2019, Kumar announced that she was writing a second season.

In 2016, she released the spiritual thriller The Calling: Unleash Your True Self, about a man overwhelmed by life's challenges who travels to Hemkund Sahib to rediscover himself.

In 2017, she released the self-help title How to Write a Book in 8 Days, a guide to writing and publishing a manuscript. The same year she published the novel The Wise Man Said, about an eighty-year-old billionaire who sets aside his identity and wealth for eleven months of the year to seek out new experiences. In January 2019, ZEE5 announced a web-series adaptation of the book.

Turn the Tables: From Challenges to Opportunities (2019) is a self-help book drawn from lessons Kumar learned through challenging situations in her own life.

In 2020, she published the novel Man Hunt. My Little Book of Love (2021) is a short non-fiction work on love and detachment. Kumar co-wrote the memoir of badminton coach Pullela Gopichand, Shuttler's Flick: Making Every Match Count (2021, Simon & Schuster India), which chronicles his journey from player to national coach. The same year she published A Regal Man: The Life & Lessons of Vasu Shroff, a biography of the Dubai-based founder of the Regal Group, which traces how he built a single shop into a multi-billion-dollar business.

In 2023, she published the novel Millionaire's Island, in which a man travels to an island programme to learn how to become a millionaire and confronts questions of self-discovery and personal truth. It is based on the success philosophy of entrepreneur Sachin Adhikari.

In 2024, HarperCollins India published A.M. Naik: The Man Who Built Tomorrow, co-written with Jairam N. Menon, a biography of A. M. Naik, the former group chairman of Larsen & Toubro.

In July 2026, HarperCollins India published The Next Mountain: Notes on Resilience, Leadership and Purpose, the life story of former Network18 CEO Avinash Kaul as told to Kumar. The book became an Amazon bestseller.

Also in 2026, HarperCollins India published Hand over Heart: The Life and Legacy of Shashi Ruia, Kumar's biography of the co-founder of the Essar Group, with a foreword by Ravi Ruia.

In December 2025, Kumar announced a further slate of official biographies in progress, including those of Babasaheb Kalyani (Bharat Forge), Sunder Genomal (Page Industries), Niranjan Hiranandani, Ramesh Kumar Dua (Relaxo) and Firoz Merchant (Pure Gold).

== Books ==
=== Biographies ===
Year	Title	Subject	Publisher	Notes
2014	The Inspiring Journey of a Hero	Om Prakash Munjal, founder of Hero Cycles	Penguin Books India	Hindi translation Ek Super Hero Ki Shandaar Kahani (2015)
2015	Dream Dare Deliver: The Inspirational Journey of Subhasish Chakraborty and the Making of DTDC	Subhasish Chakraborty, founder of DTDC	Embassy Books	
2021	Shuttler's Flick: Making Every Match Count	Pullela Gopichand, badminton coach	Simon & Schuster India	Co-written with Gopichand
2021	A Regal Man: The Life & Lessons of Vasu Shroff	Vasu Shroff, founder of Regal Group, Dubai	Regal Group / Embassy Books	
2024	A.M. Naik: The Man Who Built Tomorrow	A. M. Naik, Larsen & Toubro	HarperCollins India	Co-written with Jairam N. Menon
2026	The Next Mountain: Notes on Resilience, Leadership and Purpose	Avinash Kaul, former CEO of Network18	HarperCollins India	As told to Kumar; Amazon bestseller
2026	Hand over Heart: The Life and Legacy of Shashi Ruia	Shashi Ruia, co-founder of Essar Group	HarperCollins India (HarperVantage)	Foreword by Ravi Ruia

=== Fiction and non-fiction ===
Year	Title	Genre	Publisher	Notes
2010	License to Live: A Seeker's Journey to Greatness	Fiction (inspirational)	Embassy Books	Nominated for the Vodafone Crossword Book Award (2010)
2010	I Am Another You: A Journey to Powerful Breakthroughs	Non-fiction	Embassy Books	Account of the author's experiences with shamanism
2011	The Perfect World: A Journey to Infinite Possibilities	Fiction	Embassy Books	
2013	Thinking Aloud: A Collection of Original Inspirational Quotes	Non-fiction	Embassy Books	Quotations and anecdotes
2015	I Will Go with You: The Flight of a Lifetime	Fiction (thriller)	Cognite / Books That Inspire	Adapted as The Final Call (ZEE5, 2019)
2016	The Calling: Unleash Your True Self	Fiction (spiritual thriller)	Books That Inspire	
2017	How to Write a Book in 8 Days	Non-fiction (self-help)	Books That Inspire	
2017	The Wise Man Said	Fiction	Books That Inspire	Web-series adaptation announced by ZEE5 (2019)
2019	Turn the Tables: From Challenges to Opportunities	Non-fiction (self-help)	Books That Inspire	
2020	Man Hunt	Fiction	Books That Inspire	
2021	My Little Book of Love	Non-fiction	Books That Inspire	
2023	Millionaire's Island	Fiction	Books That Inspire	Based on the success philosophy of entrepreneur Sachin Adhikari

== See also ==
- List of Indian writers
