= I Will Go with You (novel) =

2015 novel by Priya Kumar

I Will Go with You: The Flight of a Lifetime
- Author: Priya Kumar
- Language: English
- Subject: afterlife, karma, mortality and spirituality
- Publisher: Cognite — an Imprint of Embassy Books
- Publication date: 2015
- Publication place: India
- Media type: Print (Paperback)
- Pages: 232
- ISBN: 978-9383359660

I Will Go with You: The Flight of a Lifetime is a 2015 suspense thriller novel by Indian writer Priya Kumar. It is the fifth book written by Priya Kumar. The plot follows a pilot of the flight, who decides to commit suicide while on board. Instead of dying alone, he chooses to endanger the lives of 300 passengers of the flight and dies in mid-air along with them. The novel became bestseller, and was adapted into 2019 web television series The Final Call.

== Publication ==
I Will Go with You was published by the Embassy Books. It became bestseller. The book is dedicated to the victims of the Malaysia Airlines Flight 370 (MH370) which disappeared mysteriously in March 2014.

== Characters ==
The main characters are:

- Muttuswamy – an astrologer who knows what lies ahead and acts as the spiritual guardian to enlighten the lost souls.
- Sara – a journalist-author, who after lot of turbulence, finally succeed to write the last chapter of her book.
- Jim – a young boy and football player
- Paul – a good-looking and successful billionaire, who despite having everything still feels empty and wandering for something which money can never buy.

== Plot ==
The story centres around the passengers of a flight from Mumbai to Sydney whose lives are endangered after the pilot decides to commit suicide on board.

== Theme ==
The novel deals with several themes including afterlife, karma, mortality and spirituality. It raises several questions relating to life and death, and tries to answer it.

== Reception ==
Anuradha Shankar wrote in Complete Wellbeing magazine: "This is an intriguing story that combines the heavy questions of life, death and everything in between, in the form of a suspense thriller. The author intersperses the fictional narrative with bits of philosophical thought, making make us stop and think about the situation, and even helps us relate them to our own circumstances. In spite of this, the story doesn’t lose its momentum." Shankar termed the novel 'inspirational suspense.' Huzan Tata of Verve magazine calls the novel an 'inspirational work' and a 'gripping read'.

== Adaptation ==
ZEE5 announced The Final Call, a web television series based on the novel in 2018. Starring Arjun Rampal, Neeraj Kabi, Sakshi Tanwar‚ Anupriya Goenka, Javed Jaffrey, and Vipin Sharma, the series premiered in February 2019.
