= Gopichand Badminton Academy =

Badminton academy in Hyderabad, India

Coordinates: 17°26′17.7684″N 78°20′47.5116″E

- Named after: Pullela Gopichand
- Formation: 2004; 22 years ago
- Founder: Pullela Gopichand
- Type: Badminton academy
- Location: Hyderabad, Telangana, India
- Region served: India
- Website: gopichandacademy.com

Pullela Gopichand Badminton Academy (PGBA) is a badminton training facility in Hyderabad, Telangana, India. Founded in 2004 by the 2001 All England Open Badminton champion Pullela Gopichand, the facility trains several badminton players such as Saina Nehwal, P. V. Sindhu, Srikanth Kidambi, Parupalli Kashyap, Prannoy H. S., Sai Praneeth, Sameer Verma.

== History ==
By the time he won the All England Open Badminton Championships in 2001, Gopichand was already 27 years old and struggling with a few injuries. With not many playing years left, Gopichand decided to bring a world-class training facility for the next generation. With that intention, Gopichand decided to form a badminton academy. Soon after his well-recognized win in England, the Government of Andhra Pradesh under the leadership of Nara Chandrababu Naidu awarded him 5 acres (2.0 ha) of land in 2003. The land in Hyderabad's Gachibowli area was offered as a lease at a very nominal rate for 45 years. At the same time, he started talks with Yonex for sponsorship and also wanted to involve a foreign coach.

In the following year, Gopichand formulated his plans for the academy and approached Nimmagadda Prasad, a distant relative and a serial entrepreneur, to raise money for this venture. At that time, Prasad sold Matrix Laboratories, a pharmaceutical manufacturing company, to an American pharma company, Mylan Inc. Since Prasad was convinced about Gopichand's idea, he immediately offered US$500,000 and his assistance in raising an additional amount of US$2 million. With cricket being a more popular sport, Gopichand and Prasad found it hard to raise additional money from other sources. Over time, Prasad increased his contribution to US$1.25 million. Gopichand's wife and former Olympian, P. V. V. Lakshmi, was very supportive of him and even contributed to the effort of securing monetary support. Despite other donations, Gopichand could only gather US$1.75 million. It was then he decided to mortgage his family home and raise the remaining money for the already delayed project. In 2008, the facility was eventually completed at the cost of US$2.5 million.

Immediately after the construction, the Government of India sent the Commonwealth Games team to train at this facility. The government increased the daily rate they pay per player to US$20 for this special Games camp. This was a big jump from the US$5 daily fee per player that the government had previously paid for other training camps.

In 2008, Gopichand appealed to Bollywood, the Hindi cinema industry to become badminton's brand ambassador. He felt that by having a popular cinema icon supporting the sport will help popularize it.

Despite Saina Nehwal's success in international tournaments, Gopichand found it hard to run the Academy. To run it at an optimal level, it requires US$300,000 a year. As of 2010, he was making do with US$100,000 to pay the training cost for 60 players and was holding off hiring more coaches.

== Facilities ==
After construction, the US$2.5 million badminton training academy contains eight courts, a swimming pool, weight training room, cafeteria and rooms to sleep. The construction of this facility was modeled after Bangalore's Prakash Padukone Badminton Academy, which is headed by Prakash Padukone. The architectural design was completed by Hyderabad-based Arvee Consultants. The wooden flooring of the courts were made as per international standards. In addition, physiotherapy, food and diet programs are also available. The second such facility is opened at the Shahid Vijay Singh Pathik Sports Complex, Greater Noida. They have recently started their unit in Salem, Tamil Nadu. There are already academies at the Gwalior, Vadodara and Hyderabad.

== Tournament center ==
The Academy has also served as a venue for major sporting events. The 2009 Indian Open was held here while the 2009 BWF World Championships used it as a training venue.

== Notable players ==
- Saina Nehwal who was ranked 1 in the women's singles category, Olympic Bronze Medalist.
- P. V. Sindhu, who is ranked 6 currently in women's singles category, was ranked 2 and the only Indian female to win Olympic medal twice Silver in 2016 Rio and bronze in 2020 Tokyo, Japan .
- Srikanth Kidambi, who was ranked 1 in the men's singles category.
- Parupalli Kashyap, who is formerly ranked 6 in the men's singles category.
- Prannoy H. S., who was ranked 8 in the men's singles category.
- Sameer Verma, who was ranked 11 in men's singles category.
- B. Sai Praneeth, who is ranked 11 in men's singles category.
- N. Sikki Reddy, who is ranked 17 & 23 in mixed & women's doubles category (Best rank 13 in XD).
- Satwiksairaj Rankireddy, who is ranked 1 in men's doubles category.
- Pranaav Jerry Chopra, who is ranked 28 in mixed doubles category (Best rank 13).
- Gadde Ruthvika Shivani
- Rituparna Das
- Gurusai Datt, who was ranked 19 in the men's singles category.
- Arundhati Pantawane, who was ranked 42 in women's singles category (Currently coach at PGBA).
- Arun Vishnu, who was ranked 44 in mixed doubles category (Junior national coach & coaching doubles players at PGBA ).

== Noteworthy medals achieved by the students ==
- 3 Olympic medals (1 Silver & 2 Bronze), 8 World Championship medals (1 Gold, 3 Silver & 4 Bronze).
- Around 15 Super series & Super series premier titles, & many GPG, GP, IC & IS medals.
