= Shuttler's Flick =

2021 autobiography of Pullela Gopichand

- First edition
- Author: Pullela Gopichand, Priya Kumar
- Language: Indian English
- Genre: Autobiography
- Published: 2021
- Publisher: S&S India
- Publication place: India
- ISBN: 8-195-05713-6

Shuttler’s Flick: Making Every Match Count is a 2021 book published by Simon & Schuster India. The book is an autobiography of Pullela Gopichand, an Indian badminton player, and it is written with Priya Kumar.

== Reception ==
Ashwin Achal reviewed the work for The Hindu and praised it. He wrote that it is “fitting” that the book starts with the win of Gopichand in the 2001 All England Open Badminton Championships. Further, he praised Gopichand for not shying away to tackle prickly subjects and he noted that the inputs from Gopichand’s wife, Saina Nehwal, PV Sidhu, and others “come as a welcome addition to this cerebral, inspiring read.”

In a book review for Firstpost, Chintan Modi wrote that it “would appeal to various kinds of people – those who enjoy reading about sports, those who like books on leadership, those who are curious about the lives of famous personalities, and those who thrive on self-help.” Modi also said that the book doesn't demand a prior knowledge on the subject but it is helpful to understand the inner life of the sportsman and mental training needed to stay calm.

The book, wrote Kunal Doley for The Financial Express, “is more than an autobiography because it doesn’t just talk about winning titles but to achieve one’s dreams. It gives an insight not only into the world of badminton but also into the real world.” He noted that the authors have integrated a lot of self-help elements with personal elements to keep the book relevant for the general public.

The book made to the list of “ A dip into the best of 2021” of Deccan Herald.
