= Haw Chiou Hwee =

Malaysian badminton player (born 1987)

Haw Chiou Hwee 山楂花
Personal information
- Born: 15 November 1987 (age 38)

Sport
- Country: Malaysia
- Sport: Badminton
- Event: Women's & mixed doubles

Women's & mixed doubles
- BWF profile
Medal record
Women's badminton
Representing Malaysia
Asian Junior Championships
Silver medal – second place	2005 Jakarta	Girls' team

Haw Chiou Hwee (born 15 November 1987) is a Malaysian badminton player. She was part of the Malaysia junior team that won the silver medal at the 2005 Asian Junior Championships in the girls' team event after defeated by the Chinese team in the final. She claimed the women's doubles title at the 2006 National Grand Prix finals partnered with Julia Wong Pei Xian. She teamed with Lim Pek Siah, and won the international title at the 2007 Victorian and Malaysia International tournament.

== Achievements ==
=== BWF Grand Prix ===
The BWF Grand Prix has two levels: Grand Prix and Grand Prix Gold. It is a series of badminton tournaments, sanctioned by Badminton World Federation (BWF) since 2007.

Women's doubles
Year	Tournament	Partner	Opponent	Score	Result
2008	New Zealand Open	(Malaysia) Lim Pek Siah	(Chinese Taipei) Chien Yu-chin (Chinese Taipei) Chou Chia-chi	8–21, 15–21	(silver) Runner-up

=== BWF International Challenge/Series ===
Women's doubles
Year	Tournament	Partner	Opponent	Score	Result
2007	Malaysia International	(Malaysia) Lim Pek Siah	(Malaysia) Ng Hui Lin (Malaysia) Goh Liu Ying	23–21, 19–21, 21–11	(gold) Winner
2007	Bulgarian International	(Malaysia) Lim Pek Siah	(Russia) Valeri Sorokina (Russia) Nina Vislova	21–16, 13–21, 5–21	(silver) Runner-up
2007	Victorian International	(Malaysia) Lim Pek Siah	(New Zealand) Renee Flavell (New Zealand) Donna Cranston	21–8, 21–14	(gold) Winner
2006	Sri Lanka Satellite	(Malaysia) Lim Yin Loo	(India) Jwala Gutta (India) Shruti Kurien	15–21, 21–14, 20–22	(silver) Runner-up

Mixed doubles
Year	Tournament	Partner	Opponent	Score	Result
2006	Sri Lanka Satellite	(Malaysia) Chan Peng Soon	(India) Chetan Anand (India) Jwala Gutta	10–21, 21–15, 18–21	(silver) Runner-up

BWF International Challenge tournament
BWF International Series tournament
