= Vincent Lobo =

Indian badminton player

Personal information
- Born: 16 August 1977 (age 49)
- Height: 1.74 m (5 ft 9 in)

Sport
- Country: India
- Sport: Badminton
- Handedness: Right
- BWF profile
Medal record
Men's badminton
Representing India
Commonwealth Games
Silver medal – second place	1998 Kuala Lumpur	Men's team

Vincent Lobo (born 16 August 1977) is a former Indian badminton player. He has won numerous local, state and national level titles. At the national level, he has won eight Indian badminton national championship titles over his career.

His first two Indian national titles came in 1989 at Bangalore when he was 12 years old and coached by his father Derrick Lobo. Vincent won the Under 12 Boys Singles and Doubles Indian National titles, partnering Advait Maniar.

During his teenage years he was coached by both Uday Pawar and Leroy D’sa and was consistently ranked nationally in the top 10 in his respective age groups in both the singles and doubles.

The next 2 Indian national titles came at the Under 22 Doubles Nationals in 1996 where he won the Boys Doubles partnering Sachin Ratti and Mixed Doubles partnering Larissa Sadarangani.

At the senior level he was the Indian National Mens Doubles and Mixed Doubles Champion in both 1999 and 2001. The Mens doubles he partnered with Jaseel Ismail for both titles while in mixed doubles he partnered with Archana Deodar and Madhumita Bisht respectively.

In 2000 Vincent was part of the Indian Mens Badminton Team that qualified to play in the Thomas Cup finals. He partnered with Pullela Gopichand in doubles to clinch the crucial match to beat Thailand (3-1) and move India to the finals stage at Kuala Lumpur. India reached the finals stage after a gap of 12 years when taken there in 1988 led by the renowned Prakash Padukone.

In addition to his multiple national championship titles he was the silver medalist in badminton at the 1998 Commonwealth Games in the Men's Team event.

In 2001 at the age of 23 years, Vincent decided to retire from competitive badminton to pursue his MBA studies in America and has settled in the Philadelphia Area.

== Achievements ==
=== IBF International ===
Men's doubles
Year	Tournament	Partner	Opponent	Score	Result
1998	India International	(India) Jaseel P. Ismail	(Malaysia) Jeremy Gan (Malaysia) Chan Chong Ming	10–15, 15–17	(silver) Runner-up
1999	India International	(India) Jaseel P. Ismail	(India) Rajeev Bagga (India) Vinod Kumar	15–4, 17–14	(gold) Winner

Mixed doubles
Year	Tournament	Partner	Opponent	Score	Result
1998	India International	(India) P. V. V. Lakshmi	(India) Vinod Kumar (India) Madhumita Bisht	12–15, 14–17	(silver) Runner-up
