= The Final Call (TV series) =

Indian web series

- Genre: Serial drama Thriller; Philosophy
- Based on: I Will Go with You by Priya Kumar
- Written by: Vijay Lalwani; (Dialogues by); Ramendra Vasishth
- Directed by: Vijay Lalwani
- Starring: Arjun Rampal; Neeraj Kabi; Harshad Arora; Anupriya Goenka; Javed Jaffrey; Sakshi Tanwar; Paula McGlynn; Anshuman Malhotra
- Composers: Sanjoy Dazz; Ambar Das
- Country of origin: India
- Original language: Hindi
- No. of seasons: 1
- No. of episodes: 8

Production
- Executive producer: Rakesh Bhagwani
- Producers: Ajay G. Rai; Vinamrata Rai; Nishikant Kamat
- Production location: India
- Cinematography: Yiannis Manolopoulos
- Editor: Nitesh Bhatia
- Running time: 40 minutes approx
- Production company: JAR Pictures

Original release
- Network: ZEE5
- Release: 22 February – 22 March 2019

The Final Call is a 2019 Indian streaming television thriller series based on 2015 novel I Will Go with You by Priya Kumar. Directed by Vijay Lalwani, it centres around the passengers of a flight from Mumbai to Sydney whose lives are endangered after the captain decides to commit suicide on board. Starring Arjun Rampal, Neeraj Kabi, Sakshi Tanwar, Harshad Arora‚ Anupriya Goenka, Javed Jaffrey, Paula McGlynn, Anshuman Malhotra and Vipin Sharma, The Final Call premiered on the online streaming platform ZEE5 on 22 February 2019.

== Cast ==
- Arjun Rampal as Captain Karan Sachdev, a pilot who was a Wing commander in the Indian Air Force.
- Neeraj Kabi as V. Krishnamurthi
- Harshad Arora as Abhimanyu Sahai
- Javed Jaffrey as Siddharth Singhaniya
- Anupriya Goenka as Parineeta "Pari"
- Sakshi Tanwar as ATC Kiran Mirza
- Vipin Sharma as ATS Chief Kale
- Meenal Kapoor as Editor in chief Shalini
- Paula McGlynn as Sarah Parker
- Anshuman Malhotra as Dhruv Sehgal
- Vineet Sharma as Jaikrit Tyagi
- Sulabha Arya as Dhruv's grandmother
- Lydia Backhouse as Giselle
- Ivan Sylvester Rodrigues as Thakur

== Filming ==
The series was filmed in Kashmir, Kochi, Thailand and London. Some portions of the show were shot in London on the same set of a plane where the 2016 film Sully was shot. Rampal took several flight simulation classes for the role. It was earlier titled Row No. 26.

== Episodes ==
No. overall	No. in season	Title	Directed by	Written by	Original release date
1	1	"The Pilot"	Vijay Lalwani	Vijay Lalwani	22 February 2019
2	2	"Off Communication"	Vijay Lalwani	Vijay Lalwani	22 February 2019
3	3	"Power Of Force"	Vijay Lalwani	Vijay Lalwani	22 February 2019
4	4	"Do You Copy?"	Vijay Lalwani	Vijay Lalwani	22 February 2019
5	5	"Thunder Cloud"	Vijay Lalwani	Vijay Lalwani	22 March 2019
6	6	"The Journey That Matter"	Vijay Lalwani	Vijay Lalwani	22 March 2019
7	7	"Change In Plan"	Vijay Lalwani	Vijay Lalwani	22 March 2019
8	8	"The Finale"	Vijay Lalwani	Vijay Lalwani	22 March 2019
