= P. V. V. Lakshmi =

Indian badminton player

Personal information
- Full name: Pandimukkala Venkata Vara Lakshmi
- Born: 8 November 1974 (age 52) Vijayawada, Krishna District, Andhra Pradesh
- Height: 170 cm (5 ft 7 in)
- Spouse: Pullela Gopichand (m. 2002)

Sport
- Country: India
- Sport: Badminton
- Handedness: Right
- BWF profile
Medal record
Women's badminton
Representing India
Commonwealth Games
Bronze medal – third place	1998 Kuala Lumpur	Women's team

Pandimukkala Venkata Vara Lakshmi (born 8 November 1974), better known as P. V. V. Lakshmi, is an Indian former badminton player. She is an eight-time Indian national champion in badminton and represented India in the 1996 Atlanta Olympics. She is also the wife of Pullela Gopichand. She was the bronze medalist in badminton at the 1998 Commonwealth Games in the Women's Team event.

== Gopichand Badminton Academy ==
P. V. V. Lakshmi, was very supportive of Gopichand during the formation of Gopichand Badminton Academy and even contributed to the effort of securing monetary support. Despite other donations, Gopichand could only gather US$1.75 million. It was then they decided to mortgage his family home and raise the remaining money for the already delayed project. In 2008, the facility was eventually completed at the cost of $2.5 million. Immediately after the construction, the Government of India sent the Commonwealth Games team to train at this facility. The government increased the daily rate they pay per player to $20 for this special Games camp. This was a big jump from the $5 daily fee per player that the government had previously paid for other training camps.

In 2008, they appealed to Bollywood, the Hindi cinema industry to become badminton's brand ambassador. They felt that by having a popular cinema icon supporting the sport will help popularize it.

Despite Saina Nehwal's success in international tournaments, Gopichand and Lakshmi found it hard to run the Academy. To run it at an optimal level, it requires $300,000 a year. As of 2010, he was making do with $100,000 to pay the training cost for 60 players and was holding off hiring more coaches.

== Achievements ==
=== IBF International ===
Women's singles
Year	Tournament	Opponent	Score	Result
1999	India International	(India) B. R. Meenakshi	11–7, 4–11, 10–13	(silver) Runner-up

Women's doubles
Year	Tournament	Partner	Opponent	Score	Result
1998	India International	(India) Madhumita Bisht	(India) Archana Deodhar (India) Manjusha Kanwar	6–15, 15–13, 15–9	(gold) Winner
1999	India International	(India) Archana Deodhar	(India) Trupti Murgunde (India) Ketaki Thakkar	9–15, 15–3, 15–3	(gold) Winner

Mixed doubles
Year	Tournament	Partner	Opponent	Score	Result
1998	India International	(India) Vincent Lobo	(India) Vinod Kumar (India) Madhumita Bisht	12–15, 14–17	(silver) Runner-up
1999	India International	(India) J. B. S. Vidyadhar	(India) Vinod Kumar (India) B. R. Meenakshi	17–14, 15–6	(gold) Winner

== Personal life ==
P. V. V. Lakshmi married fellow badminton player Pullela Gopichand on 5 June 2002. They have two children, a daughter named Gayatri Gopichand and a son named Vishnu. Gayathri, who is the elder of the two siblings, is an international women's doubles badminton player for India. Her son Vishnu is also training at the Gopichand Academy. After their marriage, Gopichand concentrated on the badminton academy and Lakshmi helped him.
