= Deepthi Chapala =

Indian Badminton player

Sport
- Country: India
- Sport: Badminton
Medal record
Representing India
Women's badminton
Commonwealth Games
Bronze medal – third place	1998 Kuala Lumpur	Women's team

Deepthi Chapala, also known as C.H. Deepthi, is an Indian former badminton player. She was the bronze medalist in badminton at the 1998 Commonwealth Games in the Women's Team event.
