= St. Kabir Public School =

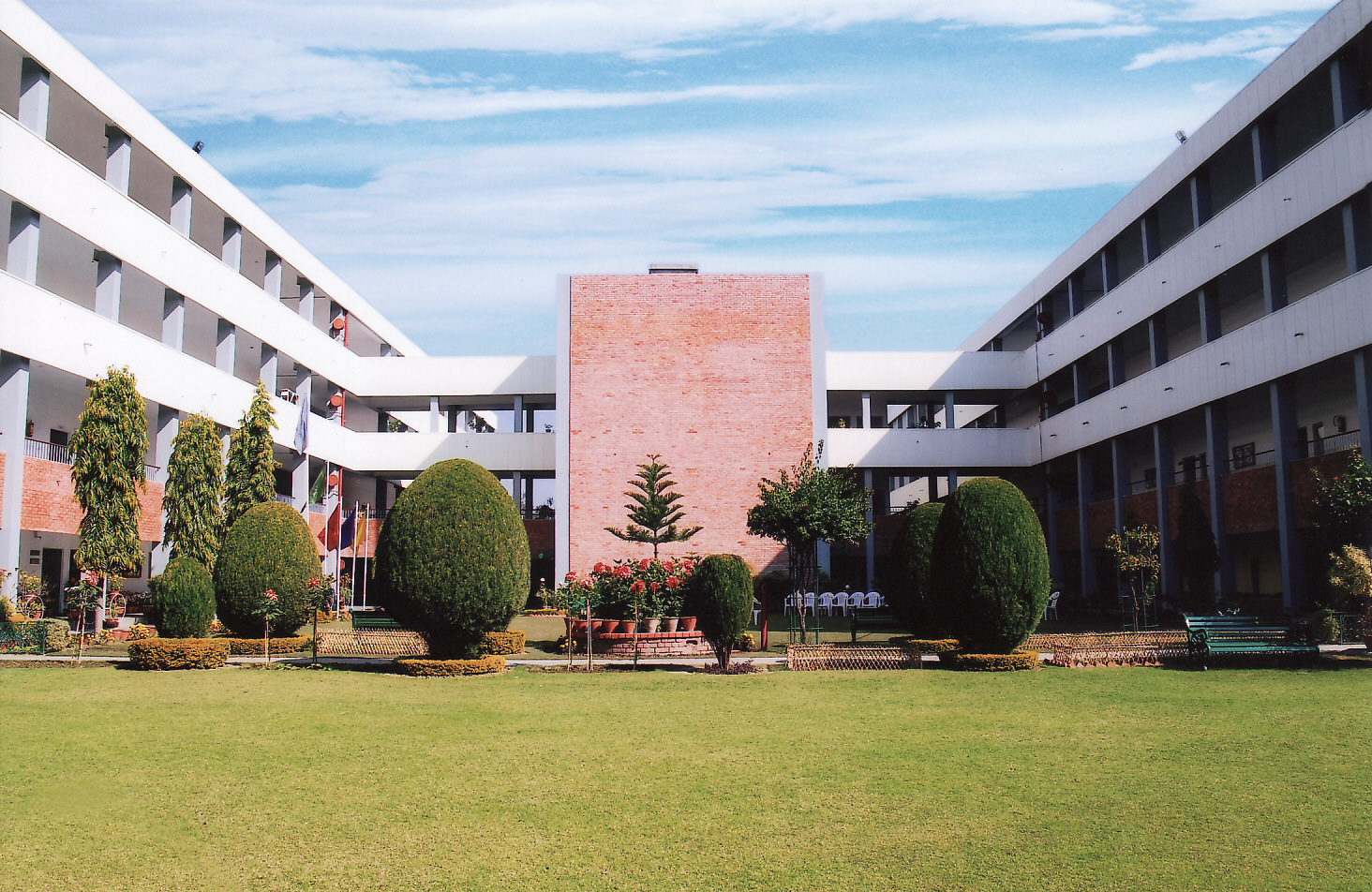
- St. Kabir Public School, Sector 26, Chandigarh

Location
- Sector 26, Chandigarh, India; India; 30.7284°N 76.8135°E

Information
- Type: Private, co-educational
- Motto: Labor Omnia Vincit
- Established: 1974
- Campus: Urban

St. Kabir Public School is a co-educational, private school located in Sector 26, Chandigarh, India.

== History ==
St. Kabir Public School was established in 1974 in Sector 8 Chandigarh, India. Its motto is Labor Omnia Vincit. In 1991, it shifted to its current facility in Sector 26 Chandigarh. It has been consistently ranked as one of the best schools in the Tri-City area (Chandigarh, Mohali and Panchkula) for the years 2013, 2014, and 2015.
