= Badminton at the 1998 Commonwealth Games =

- Venue: Kuala Lumpur Badminton Stadium
- Location: Kuala Lumpur, Malaysia
- Dates: 11 to 21 September 1998

Badminton at the 1998 Commonwealth Games was the ninth appearance of Badminton at the Commonwealth Games. The events took place in Kuala Lumpur, Malaysia, from 11 September until 21 September 1998. There were no bronze medal play off matches because both losing semi-finalists were awarded a bronze medal.

The badminton events were held the Kuala Lumpur Badminton Stadium in Cheras.

Malaysia topped the badminton medal table by virtue of winning three gold medals.

== Medal table ==
Rank	Nation	Gold	Silver	Bronze	Total
1	Malaysia (MAS)*	3	4	0	7
2	England (ENG)	3	1	7	11
3	Wales (WAL)	1	0	0	1
4	India (IND)	0	2	2	4
5	Australia (AUS)	0	0	2	2
5	New Zealand (NZL)	0	0	2	2
7	Scotland (SCO)	0	0	1	1
Totals (7 entries)		7	7	14	28

== Medallists ==
Event	Gold	Silver	Bronze	
Men's singles	(Malaysia) Wong Choong Hann	(Malaysia) Yong Hock Kin	(India) Pullela Gopichand	(England) Darren Hall
Women's singles	(Wales) Kelly Morgan	(India) Aparna Popat	(England) Tracey Hallam	(England) Julia Mann
Men's doubles	(Malaysia) Choong Tan Fook (Malaysia) Lee Wan Wah	(Malaysia) Cheah Soon Kit (Malaysia) Yap Kim Hock	(England) Simon Archer (England) Chris Hunt	(England) Julian Robertson (England) Nathan Robertson
Women's doubles	(England) Donna Kellogg (England) Joanne Goode	(Malaysia) Chor Hooi Yee (Malaysia) Lim Pek Siah	(New Zealand) Tammy Jenkins (New Zealand) Rhona Robertson	(Scotland) Elinor Middlemiss (Scotland) Sandra Watt
Mixed doubles	(England) Simon Archer (England) Joanne Goode	(England) Nathan Robertson (England) Joanne Davies	(Australia) Peter Blackburn (Australia) Rhonda Cator	(England) Chris Hunt (England) Donna Kellogg
Men's team	Malaysia	India	England	New Zealand
Women's team	England	Malaysia	India	Australia

=== Team medallists ===
Event	Gold	Silver	Bronze	
Men's team	Malaysia; Wong Choong Hann; Ong Ewe Hock; Yong Hock Kin; Yap Kim Hock; Cheah Soon Kit; Choong Tan Fook; Lee Wan Wah	India; Abhinn Shyam Gupta; George Thomas; Pullela Gopichand; Jaseel Ismail; Marcos Bristow; Nikhil Kanetkar; Vincent Lobo	England; Chris Hunt; Darren Hall; Julian Robertson; Mark Constable; Nathan Robertson; Peter Knowles; Simon Archer	New Zealand; Antonio Gargiulo; Christopher Blair; Daniel Shirley; Dean Galt; Geoffrey Bellingham; Jarrod King; Nicholas Hall
Women's team	England; Donna Kellogg; Joanne Davies; Joanne Goode; Julia Mann; Rebecca Pantaney; Sara Sankey; Tracey Hallam	Malaysia; Chor Hooi Yee; Joanne Quay; Ng Mee Fen; Norhasikin Amin; Law Pei Pei; Lim Pek Siah; Woon Sze Mei	India; Aparna Popat; Archana Deodhar; Deepthi Chapala; Madhumita Bisht; Manjusha Kanwar; K. Neelima Chowdary; P. V. V. Lakshmi	Australia; Amanda Hardy; Kate Wilson-Smith; Kellie Lucas; Michaela Smith; Rayoni Head; Rhonda Cator; Sarah Hicks

== Finals ==
Event	Gold	Silver	Score
Men's singles	(Malaysia) Wong Choong Hann	(Malaysia) Yong Hock Kin	10–15, 15–12, 15–6
Women's singles	(Wales) Kelly Morgan	(India) Aparna Popat	13–10, 11–5
Men's doubles	(Malaysia) Choong Tan Fook (Malaysia) Lee Wan Wah	(Malaysia) Cheah Soon Kit (Malaysia) Yap Kim Hock	15–7, 15–4
Women's doubles	(England) Donna Kellogg (England) Joanne Goode	(Malaysia) Chor Hooi Yee (Malaysia) Lim Pek Siah	15–8, 15–6
Mixed doubles	(England) Simon Archer (England) Joanne Goode	(England) Nathan Robertson (England) Joanne Davies	15–2, 15–5
Men's team	Malaysia	India	N/A
Women's team	England	Malaysia	N/A

== Results ==
=== Men's singles ===
Round of 16
(Malaysia) Wong Choong Hann	15	15
(Wales) Richard Vaughan	6	9
(England) Mark Constable	15	15
(New Zealand) Geoff Bellingham	3	11
(India) Pullela Gopichand	15	15
(Pakistan) Ali Yar Beg	2	1
(Wales) John Leung	15	15
(Australia) Stuart Brehaut	11	10
(Malaysia) Yong Hock Kin	15	15
(Wales) Geraint Lewis	3	2
(Scotland) Bruce Flockhart	15	15
(Canada) Bobby Milroy	9	11
(England) Darren Hall	15	7	15
(India) Nikhil Kanetkar	6	15	5
(New Zealand) Nick Hall	15	15
(Canada) Stuart Arthur	3	2

Quarter-finals
(Malaysia) Hann	15	15
(England) Constable	3	1
(India) Pullela	15	15
(Wales) Leung	1	6
(Malaysia) Kin	15	15
(Scotland) Flockhart	5	6
(England) Hall	15	15
(New Zealand) Hall	3	12

Semi-finals
(Malaysia) Hann	15	15
(India) Pullela	1	11
(Malaysia) Kin	15	15
(England) Hall	7	1

Final
(Malaysia) Hann	10	15	15
(Malaysia) Kin	15	12	6

=== Women's singles ===
Round of 16
(Wales) Kelly Morgan	11	11
(India) Neelima Choudary	3	1
(Singapore) Zarinah Abdullah	11	11
(New Zealand) Rebecca Gordon	8	6
(England) Tracey Hallam	8	11	11
(Canada) Denyse Julien	11	7	2
(New Zealand) Rhona Robertson	11	11
(Malaysia) Woon Sze Mei	2	3
(India) Aparna Popat	11	11
(England) Rebecca Pantaney	4	8
(Malaysia) Ng Mee Fen	11	11
(South Africa) Michelle Edwards	2	2
(England) Julia Mann	4	11	11
(India) Manjusha Kanwar	11	3	3
(Scotland) Anne Gibson	13	11
(New Zealand) Amanda Carter	10	3

Quarter-finals
(Wales) Morgan	11	11
(Singapore) Abdullah	5	3
(England) Hallam	11	8	11
(New Zealand) Robertson	9	11	9
(India) Popat	11	13
(Malaysia) Ng Mee Fen	7	10
(England) Mann	11	11
(Scotland) Gibson	3	7

Semi-finals
(Wales) Morgan	11	11
(England) Hallam	6	4
(India) Popat	11	12	13
(England) Mann	8	13	11

Final
(Wales) Morgan	13	11
(India) Popat	10	5

=== Men's doubles ===
Quarterfinals
(Malaysia) Choong Tan Fook (Malaysia) Lee Wan Wah	15	15
(Australia) David Bamford (Australia) Peter Blackburn	4	8
(England) Simon Archer (England) Chris Hunt	15	15
(India) Marcos Bristow (India) George Thomas	7	3
(Malaysia) Cheah Soon Kit (Malaysia) Yap Kim Hock	15	15
(Canada) Michael Beres (Canada) Bryan Moody	5	3
(England) Julian Robertson (England) Nathan Robertson	15	15
(India) Jaseel Ismail (India) Vincent Lobo	3	4

Semifinals
(Malaysia) Fook (Malaysia) Wah	15	15
(England) Archer (England) Hunt	13	11
(Malaysia) Kit (Malaysia) Hock	15	12	15
(England) Robertson (England) Robertson	2	15	8

Finals
(Malaysia) Fook (Malaysia) Wah	15	15
(Malaysia) Kit (Malaysia) Hock	7	4

=== Women's doubles ===
Quarterfinals
(England) Joanne Goode (England) Donna Kellogg	15	15
(Canada) Charmaine Reid (Canada) Denyse Julien	7	5
(Scotland) Sandra Watt (Scotland) Elinor Middlemiss	15	15
(Malaysia) Joanne Quay (Malaysia) Norhasikin Amin	1	6
(Malaysia) Chor Hooi Yee (Malaysia) Lim Pek Siah	14	15	15
(Australia) Amanda Hardy (Australia) Rhonda Cator	17	4	9
(New Zealand) Rhona Robertson (New Zealand) Tammy Jenkins	15	15
(England) Joanne Davies (England) Sara Sankey	12	4

Semifinals
(England) Goode (England) Kellogg	15	15
(Scotland) Watt (Scotland) Middlemiss	7	3
(Malaysia) Yee (Malaysia) Siah	15	4	15
(New Zealand) Robertson (New Zealand) Jenkins	8	15	9

Finals
(England) Goode (England) Kellogg	15	15
(Malaysia) Yee (Malaysia) Siah	8	6

=== Mixed doubles ===
Quarterfinals
(England) Simon Archer (England) Joanne Goode	15	15
(New Zealand) Daniel Shirley (New Zealand) Sheree Jefferson	5	6
(Australia) Peter Blackburn (Australia) Rhonda Cator	15	1	15
(Malaysia) Wong Choon Hann (Malaysia) Chor Hooi Yee	13	15	7
(England) Nathan Robertson (England) Joanne Davies	15	15
(Australia) Murray Hocking (Australia) Amanda Hardy	6	6
(England) Chris Hunt (England) Donna Kellogg	15	15
(New Zealand) Dean Galt (New Zealand) Sharon Jenkins	3	2

Semifinals
(England) Archer (England) Goode	15	15
(Australia) Blackburn (Australia) Cator	10	4
(England) Robertson (England) Davies	7	17	17
(England) Hunt (England) Kellogg	15	15	14

Finals
(England) Archer (England) Goode	15	15
(England) Robertson (England) Davies	2	5

=== Men's team ===
Team One	Team Two	Score
England	New Zealand	4–1
Malaysia	India	4–1
England	India	2–3
Malaysia	New Zealand	5–0
England	Malaysia	1–4
India	New Zealand	4–1

Pos	Team	P	W	L
1	Malaysia	3	3	0
2	India	3	2	1
3	England*	3	1	2
4	New Zealand*	3	0	3

- England & New Zealand both awarded bronze

=== Women's team ===
Team One	Team Two	Score
England	Australia	5–0
Malaysia	India	3–2
England	Malaysia	3–2
India	Australia	4–1
England	India	2–3
Malaysia	Australia	5–0

Pos	Team	P	W	L
1	England	3	2	1
2	Malaysia	3	2	1
3	India*	3	2	1
4	Australia*	3	0	3

- India & Australia both awarded bronze
