= Lim Pek Siah =

Malaysian badminton player

Lim Pek Siah 林碧霞
Personal information
- Born: 10 August 1979 (age 47)
- Height: 1.54 m (5 ft 1 in)

Sport
- Country: Malaysia
- Sport: Badminton
- Handedness: Right
- Event: Women's & mixed doubles

Women's & mixed doubles
- BWF profile
Medal record
Women's badminton
Representing Malaysia
Commonwealth Games
Gold medal – first place	2002 Manchester	Women's doubles
Silver medal – second place	1998 Kuala lumpur	Women's doubles
Silver medal – second place	1998 Kuala lumpur	Women's team
Asian Championships
Bronze medal – third place	2006 Johor Bahru	Women's doubles
Southeast Asian Games
Silver medal – second place	2001 Kuala Lumpur	Women's doubles
Bronze medal – third place	2001 Kuala Lumpur	Women's team
Bronze medal – third place	1995 Chiang Mai	Women's team
Asian Junior Championships
Silver medal – second place	1997 Manila	Girls' doubles
Silver medal – second place	1997 Manila	Mixed doubles

Lim Pek Siah (born 10 August 1979) is a Malaysian former badminton player, who now works as a national badminton coach. Lim had won the women's doubles silver medal at the 1998 Commonwealth Games in Kuala Lumpur partnered with Chor Hooi Yee, also helped the team reach the final and clinch the silver medal. She made it to the women's doubles gold medal in 2002 Manchester with Ang Li Peng. She started her career as the women's doubles national coach in 2015.

== Achievements ==
=== Commonwealth Games ===
Women's doubles
Year	Venue	Partner	Opponent	Score	Result
2002	Bolton Arena; Manchester, England	(Malaysia) Ang Li Peng	(New Zealand) Nicole Gordon (New Zealand) Sara Petersen	7–8, 7–4, 2–7, 7–5, 7–0	Gold
1998	Kuala Lumpur Badminton Stadium; Kuala Lumpur, Malaysia	(Malaysia) Chor Hooi Yee	(England) Donna Kellogg (England) Joanne Goode	8–15, 6–15	Silver

=== Asian Championships ===
Women's doubles
Year	Venue	Partner	Opponent	Score	Result
2006	Bandaraya Stadium; Johor Bahru, Malaysia	(Malaysia) Joanne Quay	(Chinese Taipei) Chien Yu-chin (Chinese Taipei) Cheng Wen-hsing	9–21, 15–21	Bronze

=== Southeast Asian Games ===
Women's doubles
Year	Venue	Partner	Opponent	Score	Result
2001	Malawati Stadium; Selangor, Malaysia	(Malaysia) Ang Li Peng	(Indonesia) Deyana Lomban (Indonesia) Vita Marissa	5–15, 15–5, 9–15	Silver

=== Asian Junior Championships ===
Girls' doubles
Year	Venue	Partner	Opponent	Score	Result
1997	Ninoy Aquino Stadium; Manila, Philippines	(Malaysia) Chor Hooi Yee	(China) Yang Wei (China) Gao Ling	10–15, 8–15	Silver

Mixed doubles
Year	Venue	Partner	Opponent	Score	Result
1997	Ninoy Aquino Stadium; Manila, Philippines	(Malaysia) Chan Chong Ming	(China) Cheng Rui (China) Gao Ling	7–15, 9–15	Silver

=== BWF Grand Prix ===
The BWF Grand Prix has two levels: Grand Prix and Grand Prix Gold. It is a series of badminton tournaments, sanctioned by Badminton World Federation (BWF) since 2007. The World Badminton Grand Prix sanctioned by International Badminton Federation (IBF) since 1983.

Women's doubles
Year	Tournament	Partner	Opponent	Score	Result
2008	New Zealand Open	(Malaysia) Haw Chiou Hwee	(Chinese Taipei) Chien Yu-chin (Chinese Taipei) Chou Chia-chi	8–21, 15–21	(silver) Runner-up
2005	Thessaloniki Grand Prix	(Malaysia) Chor Hooi Yee	(England) Gail Emms (England) Donna Kellogg	14–17, 8–15	(silver) Runner-up
2006	New Zealand Open	(Malaysia) Joanne Quay	(Singapore) Jiang Yanmei (Singapore) Li Yujia	11–21, 21–19, 15–21	(silver) Runner-up

=== BWF International Challenge/Series ===
Women's doubles
Year	Tournament	Partner	Opponent	Score	Result
2007	Malaysia International	(Malaysia) Haw Chiou Hwee	(Malaysia) Ng Hui Lin (Malaysia) Goh Liu Ying	23–21, 19–21, 21–11	(gold) Winner
2007	Bulgarian International	(Malaysia) Haw Chiou Hwee	(Russia) Valeri Sorokina (Russia) Nina Vislova	21–16, 13–21, 5–21	(silver) Runner-up
2007	Victorian International	(Malaysia) Haw Chiou Hwee	(New Zealand) Renee Flavell (New Zealand) Donna Cranston	21–8, 21–14	(gold) Winner
2006	Fiji International	(Malaysia) Ang Li Peng	(Canada) Charmaine Reid (Canada) Fiona McKee	21–5, 21–13	(gold) Winner
2005	Norwegian International	(Malaysia) Ang Li Peng	(Germany) Nicole Grether (Germany) Juliane Schenk	8–15, 6–15	(silver) Runner-up
2004	Irish International	(Malaysia) Chor Hooi Yee	(Denmark) Pernille Harder (Denmark) Helle Nielsen	7–15, 6–15	(silver) Runner-up
2004	Scottish International	(Malaysia) Chor Hooi Yee	(Poland) Kamila Augustyn (Poland) Nadieżda Kostiuczyk	8–15, 11–15	(silver) Runner-up
2004	Hungarian International	(Malaysia) Chor Hooi Yee	(Italy) Agnese Allegrini (Italy) Hui Ding	15–4, 15–3	(gold) Winner
2004	Slovak International	(Malaysia) Chor Hooi Yee	(England) Sarah Bok (England) Hayley Connor	15–2, 9–0 Retired	(gold) Winner
2004	Australian International	(Malaysia) Chor Hooi Yee	(Australia) Renuga Veeran (Australia) Susan Wang	15–13, 8–15, 12–15	(silver) Runner-up
2002	Singapore Sateliite	(Malaysia) Ang Li Peng	(China) Li Huei (China) Yu Peng	15–7, 15–8	(gold) Winner
1999	Western Australia International	(Malaysia) Joanne Quay	(Australia) Rhonda Cator (Australia) Amanda Hardy	15–9, 15–9	(gold) Winner

Mixed doubles
Year	Tournament	Partner	Opponent	Score	Result
2004	Hungarian International	(Malaysia) Ong Ewe Hock	(Russia) Nikolai Zuyev (Russia) Marina Yakusheva	5–15, 15–9, 15–5	(gold) Winner
2000	French International	(Malaysia) Pang Cheh Chang	(Malaysia) Chan Chong Ming (Malaysia) Joanne Quay	14–17, 2–15	(silver) Runner-up
1999	Western Australia International	(Malaysia) Pang Cheh Chang	(Malaysia) Chan Chong Ming (Malaysia) Joanne Quay	15–8, 11–15, 15–6	(gold) Winner
1999	Singapore Sateliite	(Malaysia) Pang Cheh Chang	(Malaysia) Chan Chong Ming (Malaysia) Joanne Quay	15–4, 7–15, 15–3	(gold) Winner

BWF International Challenge tournament
BWF International Series tournament
BWF Future Series tournament
