= Satendra Kumar =

Indian sport shooter and Arjuna Awardee

- Satendra Kumar

Personal information
- Native name: सतेंद्र कुमार
- National team: Indian Shooting Team
- Citizenship: Indian
- Born: 3 May 1974 (age 52) Khudalia, Simbhaoli, Hapur district (then Ghaziabad district), Uttar Pradesh, India

Sport
- Country: India
- Sport: Shooting
- Events: 50 m free pistol; 10 m air pistol; 25 m centre fire pistol; 25 m standard pistol
- Club: Indian Navy Shooting Team
- Coached by: D. Lingam, Sunny Thomas, Tibor Gonczol

Satendra Kumar (born 3 May 1974) is an Indian sport shooter and a retired Indian Navy officer. He represented India in pistol events at international competitions including the ISSF World Championships, ISSF World Cups, the Asian Shooting Championships, the Commonwealth Shooting Championships and the South Asian Games during the late 1990s and 2000s. At the second Commonwealth Shooting Championship at Langkawi, Malaysia, in November 1997, he won the individual and team gold medals in the men's 50 m free pistol.

Kumar received the Arjuna Award for shooting from the Government of India in 1997.

== Early life ==
Kumar was born on 3 May 1974 at Khudalia village, Post Simbhaoli, in what is now Hapur district of Uttar Pradesh (then part of the larger Ghaziabad district). He comes from a farming family; his father Ram Kumar Singh held a licensed .12-bore rifle, around which his early interest in firearms developed.

== Naval career ==

Kumar enlisted in the Indian Navy in July 1992 and, after basic training at INS Chilka, was inducted into the Indian Navy Shooting Team in July 1994 after being identified by naval shooting coach D. Lingam. He was based for most of his competitive years at INS Agrani, Coimbatore, the Navy's shooting unit, alongside team-mates including Sanjeev Rajput.

== Shooting career ==
Kumar made his National Shooting Championship debut in 1994 in the standard pistol event at the Kanpur Nationals, before settling on the men's 50 m free pistol as his principal discipline. At the 40th National Shooting Championship at the Asansol Rifle Club Range in 1996, he won the men's free pistol gold in the eight-shooter final with 645.9, ahead of Jaspal Rana (640.9). He successfully defended the title at the 41st National Championship at the Dr. Karni Singh Shooting Range, Tughlakabad, in 1997, scoring 643.7 to again win the men's 50 m free pistol gold ahead of Rana.

Kumar's first international competition was the South Asian Shooting Championship at the Karni Singh Range, Tughlakabad, in March 1997, where he won the men's 50 m free pistol final with 639.4, ahead of Jaspal Rana (636.7) and Samresh Jung (635.4). At the second Commonwealth Shooting Championship at Langkawi, Malaysia, in November 1997, he won the individual gold medal in the men's 50 m free pistol with 555/600 and was part of the Indian team that took the team gold in the same event. He later represented India at the 1998 ISSF World Shooting Championships in Barcelona and at multiple ISSF World Cup events through 2009.

== Awards and honours ==
- Arjuna Award for shooting (1997).
- Laxman Award in 2020 - Reported by Navbharat Times as an award conferred by the Uttar Pradesh government for his contribution to shooting.
- Commonwealth Shooting Championships (1997): Gold medals in the individual and team men's 50-metre free pistol events.

== See also ==
- List of National Sports Award recipients in shooting — Wikipedia's index of Indian shooting awardees, where Kumar's name appears in the 1997 Arjuna Award list
- Indian Navy
