= Arun Murugesan =

Indian weightlifter

Arun Murugesan is an Indian weightlifter. He won the silver medal in the Men's 62 kg category at the 2006 Commonwealth Games.
