= Complete Wellbeing =

Personal growth magazine (founded 2006)

- Editor: Manoj Khatri
- Categories: Personal growth magazine
- Frequency: Monthly
- First issue: 1 November 2006
- Company: Complete Wellbeing Publishing Pvt Ltd
- Country: India
- Based in: Mumbai
- Language: English
- Website: Complete Wellbeing

Complete Wellbeing is a personal growth magazine founded in 2006. Its print edition was published from Mumbai, India, and distributed all over the country. It stopped publishing its print edition with its June 2016 issue. It continues to publish content on its website.

== History and profile ==
Complete Wellbeing was first published on 1 November 2006. The magazine promotes the idea that individuals are not sum of parts but an integrated whole. In other words, one's mind, body and soul must work in harmony to feel well. It highlights the inter-connectedness of an individual's physical, mental, emotional and spiritual aspects. The magazine targets both men and women.

In 2012 Complete Wellbeing received the Medscape India Award for excellence in media for wellbeing.
