= 2001 All England Open Badminton Championships =

2001 All England Championships
Tournament details
- Dates: 7 March 2001– 11 March 2001
- Edition: 91st
- Location: Birmingham

The 2001 Yonex All England Open was the 91st edition of the All England Open Badminton Championships. It was held from 7–11 March 2001, at the National Indoor Arena in Birmingham, England.

It was a four star tournament and the prize money was US$125,000.

== Venue ==
- National Indoor Arena

== Final results ==
Category	Winners	Runners-up	Score
Men's singles	(India) Pullela Gopichand	(China) Chen Hong	15–12, 15–6
Women's singles	(China) Gong Zhichao	(China) Zhou Mi	11–7, 11–3
Men's doubles	(Indonesia) Tony Gunawan & Halim Heryanto	(Indonesia) Sigit Budiarto & Candra Wijaya	15–13, 7–15, 15–7
Women's doubles	(China) Gao Ling & Huang Sui	(China) Zhang Jiewen & Wei Yili	10–15, 15–8, 15–9
Mixed doubles	(China) Zhang Jun & Gao Ling	(Denmark) Michael Søgaard & Rikke Olsen	13–15, 15–12, 17–14

== Men's singles ==
=== Section 1 ===
Round of 32
(India) Pullela Gopichand	15	15
(England) Colin Haugton	7	4
(China) Ji Xinpeng	15	15
(Indonesia) George Rimarcdi	11	3
(Denmark) Anders Boesen	15	15
(Netherlands) Dicky Palyama	4	8
(Indonesia) Taufik Hidayat	15	15
(Germany) Jens Roch	9	10
(Denmark) Peter Gade	8	15	15
(Hong Kong) Kai Chuen Tam	15	11	11
(Indonesia) Rony Agustinus	15	6	15
(Wales) Richard Vaughan	11	15	8
(China) Chen Yu	7	15	15
(Malaysia) Ong Ewe Hock	15	10	10
(South Korea) Shon Seung-mo	15	7	15
(Indonesia) Marleve Mainaky	12	15	11

Round of 16
(India) Gopichand	15	15
(China) Xinpeng	3	9
(Denmark) Boesen	15	15
(Indonesia) Hidayat	13	10
(Denmark) Gade	17	15
(Indonesia) Agustinus	14	10
(China) Chen Yu	17	15
(South Korea) Shon	16	11

Quarter-finals
(India) Gopichand	15	15
(Denmark) Boesen	11	7
(Denmark) Gade	15	15
(China) Chen Yu	12	3

Semi-finals
(India) Gopichand	17	17
(Denmark) Gade	14	15

=== Section 2 ===
Round of 32
(China) Chen Hong	15	15
(Sweden) Martin Hagberg	7	8
(Indonesia) Hendrawan	7	15	15
(Japan) Hidetaka Yamada	15	9	8
(Denmark) Kenneth Jonassen	15	15
(Indonesia) Agus Harianto	7	9
(Singapore) Ramesh Nathan	15	15
(South Korea) Lee Hyun-il	10	1
(Malaysia) Muhammad Roslin Hashim	15	15
(Malaysia) Lee Tsuen Seng	10	1
(Sweden) Rasmus Wengberg	17	7	15
(Indonesia) Johan Hadikusuma	16	15	11
(China) Xia Xuanze	15	15
(Malaysia) Ming Yao Alvin Chew	9	5
(Indonesia) Budi Santoso	15	15
(Denmark) Joachim Fischer Nielsen	8	11

Round of 16
(China) Chen Hong	15	15
(Indonesia) Hendrawan	13	3
(Denmark) Jonassen	15	15
(Singapore) Nathan	6	8
(Malaysia) Roslin	15	15
(Sweden) Wengberg	6	1
(China) Xuanze	15	15
(Indonesia) Santoso	4	5

Quarter-finals
(China) Chen Hong	15	15
(Denmark) Jonassen	9	9
(Malaysia) Roslin	15	15
(China) Xuanze	8	6

Semi-finals
(China) Chen Hong	10	17	15
(Malaysia) Roslin	15	16	12

== Women's singles ==
=== Section 1 ===
Round of 32
(China) Gong Zhichao	11	11
(Denmark) Tine Rasmussen	3	2
(South Korea) Hyo Sun Park	11	11
(Japan) Mika Anjo	8	1
(England) Julia Mann	2	w/o
(China) Wang Chen	2	ret
(Indonesia) Yuli Marfuah	11	11
(Denmark) Anne Marie Pedersen	5	8
(China) Gong Ruina	11	11
(Germany) Katja Michalowsky	4	1
(Indonesia) Mia Audina	11	11
(Hong Kong) Louisa Koon Wai Chee	2	9
(Sweden) Marina Andrievskaya	11	11
(England) Katy Brydon	1	1
(Japan) Miho Tanaka	11	11
(Wales) Kelly Morgan	7	3

Round of 16
(China) Zhichao	11	11
(South Korea) Hyo Sun Park	2	2
(England) Mann	11	7	11
(Indonesia) Marfuah	6	11	5
(China) Ruina	10	11	13
(Indonesia) Audina	13	6	10
(Sweden) Andrievskaya	8	11	11
(Japan) Tanaka	11	4	7

Quarter-finals
(China) Zhichao	11	11
(England) Mann	5	9
(China) Ruina	11	11
(Sweden) Andrievskaya	6	9

Semi-finals
(China) Zhichao	11	11	11
(China) Ruina	6	2	3

=== Section 2 ===
Round of 32
(China) Zhou Mi	11	11
(England) Tracey Hallam	5	5
(Netherlands) Brenda Beenhakker	11	13
(Finland) Anu Weckström	3	12
(Denmark) Camilla Martin	11	11
(Canada) Charmaine Reid	0	1
(China) Pi Hongyan	11	11
(Czech Republic) Markéta Koudelková	1	0
(China) Dai Yun	11	11
(England) Jill Pittard	4	0
(Hong Kong) Ling Wan Ting	11	11
(Japan) Kaori Mori	0	4
(China) Wang Rong	11	11
(Indonesia) Ellen Angelina	0	3
(Netherlands) Judith Meulendijks	11	11
(Japan) Kanako Yonekura	4	9

Round of 16
(China) Zhou Mi	11	11
(Netherlands) Beenhakker	0	6
(Denmark) Martin	12	11	11
(China) Hongyan	13	1	1
(China) Dai Yun	13	11
(Hong Kong) Ting Ling	10	4
(China) Wang Rong	11	9	11
(Netherlands) Meulendijks	6	11	5

Quarter-finals
(China) Zhou Mi	7	11	11
(Denmark) Martin	11	8	7
(China) Dai Yun	11	11
(China) Wang Rong	2	3

Semi-finals
(China) Zhou Mi	11	11
(China) Dai Yun	1	3
