= Pullela Gopichand =

Indian badminton player and coach

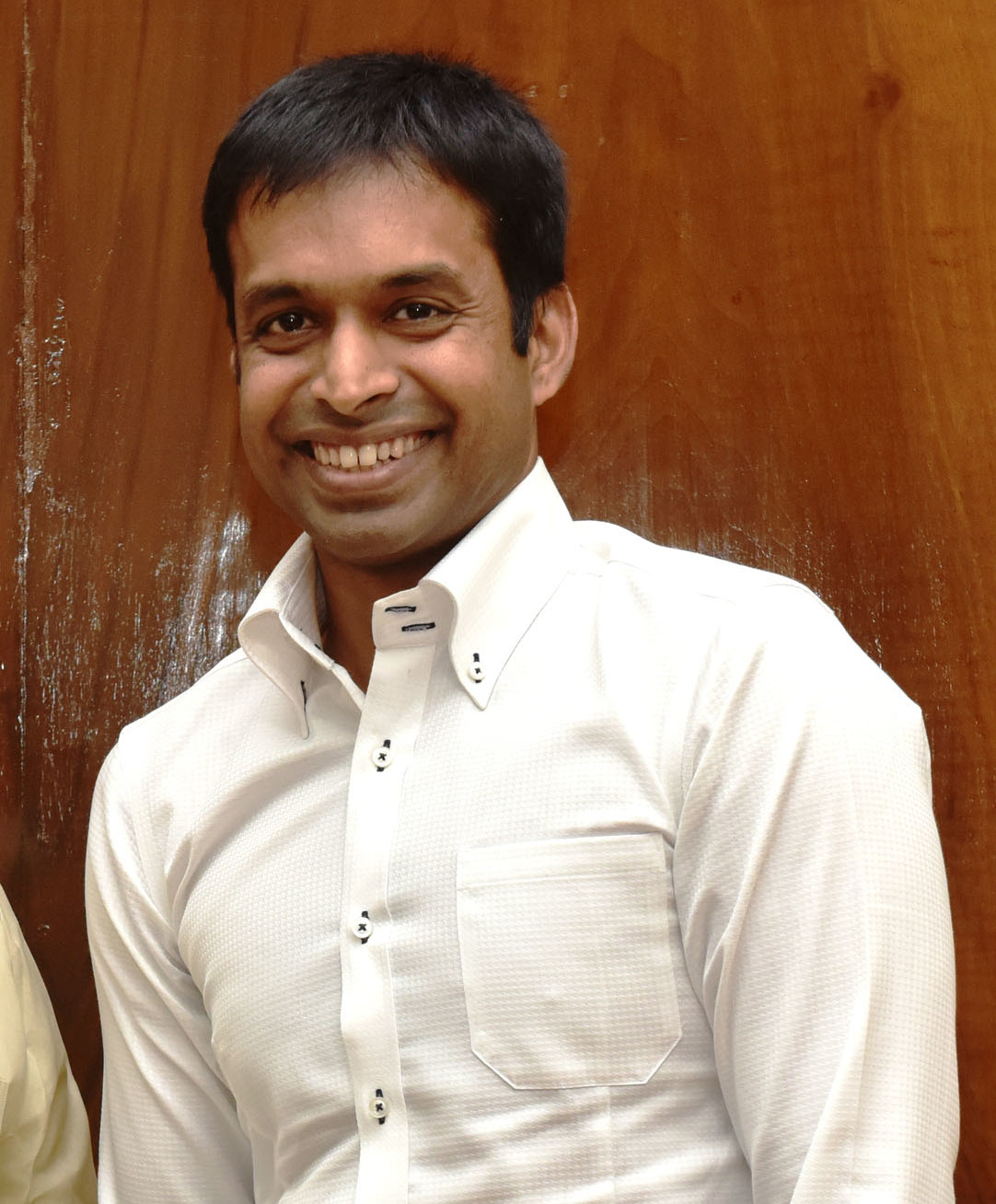

Personal information
- Born: 16 November 1973 (age 52) Nagandla, Andhra Pradesh, India
- Height: 1.82 m (6 ft 0 in)
- Weight: 68 kg (150 lb)
- Spouse: P. V. V. Lakshmi (m. 2002)

Sport
- Country: India
- Sport: Badminton
- Handedness: Right

Men's Singles
- Highest ranking: 5 (15 March 2001)
- BWF profile
Medal record
Men's badminton
Representing India
Commonwealth Games
Silver medal – second place	1998 Kuala Lumpur	Men's team
Bronze medal – third place	1998 Kuala Lumpur	Men's singles
Asian Championships
Bronze medal – third place	2000 Jakarta	Men's singles

Pullela Gopichand (born 16 November 1973) is an Indian former badminton player. Currently, he is the Chief National Coach for the India national badminton team. He won the All England Open Badminton Championships in 2001, becoming the second Indian to achieve this feat after Prakash Padukone. He runs the Gopichand Badminton Academy. He received the Arjuna Award in 1999, the Khel Ratna Award (highest sporting honour in India) in 2001, the Dronacharya Award in 2009 and the Padma Bhushan – India's third highest civilian award – in 2014. He is the only Indian coach to win the "Honourable Mention" by the International Olympic Committee at the 2019 Coaches Lifetime Achievement Awards.

== Early life ==
Pullela Gopichand was born on 16 November 1973 near Chirala Town to Pullela Subash Chandra and Pullela Subbaravamma, in Prakasam district, Andhra Pradesh.

Initially, he was interested in playing cricket, but his elder brother encouraged him to take up badminton instead.

== Playing career ==
Pullela was mainly coached by S. M. Arif. He is also trained under Prakash Padukone, and Ganguly Prasad at the SAI Bangalore. Pullela won his first National Badminton Championship title in 1996, and went on to win the title five times in a row, until 2000. He won two gold medals and one silver medal at the Indian national games, 1998, held at Imphal. At the international level, he represented India in 3 Thomas Cup tournaments. In 1996, he won a gold in the SAARC badminton tournament at Vijayawada and defended his crown in the next games held at Colombo in 1997. At the 1998 Commonwealth Games, he won a silver in the team event and a bronze in men's singles.

In 1999, he won the Toulouse Open Championship in France and the Scottish Open Championship in Scotland. He also emerged as the winner at the Asian satellite tournament held at Hyderabad in the same year, and lost in the final match of the German Grand Prix Championship.

In 2001, he won the All England Open Badminton Championships at Birmingham. He defeated then world number one Peter Gade in the semi-finals before defeating Chen Hong of China to lift the trophy. He became the second Indian to achieve the feat after Prakash Padukone, who won in 1980.

== Achievements ==
=== Asian Championships ===
Men's singles

Year	Venue	Opponent	Score	Result
2000	Istora Senayan, Jakarta, Indonesia	(Indonesia) Taufik Hidayat	4–15, 12–15	Bronze

=== Commonwealth Games ===
Men's singles

Year	Venue	Opponent	Score	Result
1998	Kuala Lumpur Badminton Stadium, Kuala Lumpur, Malaysia	(Malaysia) Wong Choong Hann	1–15, 11–15	Bronze

=== IBF World Grand Prix ===
The World Badminton Grand Prix sanctioned by International Badminton Federation (IBF) from 1983 to 2006.

Men's singles

Year	Tournament	Opponent	Score	Result
1997	India Open	(Indonesia) Hariyanto Arbi	4–15, 7–15	(silver) Runner-up
1999	French Open	(China) Chen Gang	8–15, 15–10, 10–15	(silver) Runner-up
1999	German Open	(China) Xia Xuanze	3–15, 15–13, 4–15	(silver) Runner-up
2001	All England Open	(China) Chen Hong	15–12, 15–6	(gold) Winner

=== IBF International ===
Men's singles

Year	Tournament	Opponent	Score	Result
1999	Le Volant d'Or de Toulouse	(Wales) Richard Vaughan	15–13, 14–15, 15–6	(gold) Winner
1999	Scottish Open	(India) Siddharth Jain	15–7, 15–10	(gold) Winner
1999	India International	(India) Ajit Wijetilek	15–6, 15–13	(gold) Winner
2004	India Asian Satellite	(India) J. B. S. Vidyadhar	15–6, 15–1	(gold) Winner

== Coaching career ==
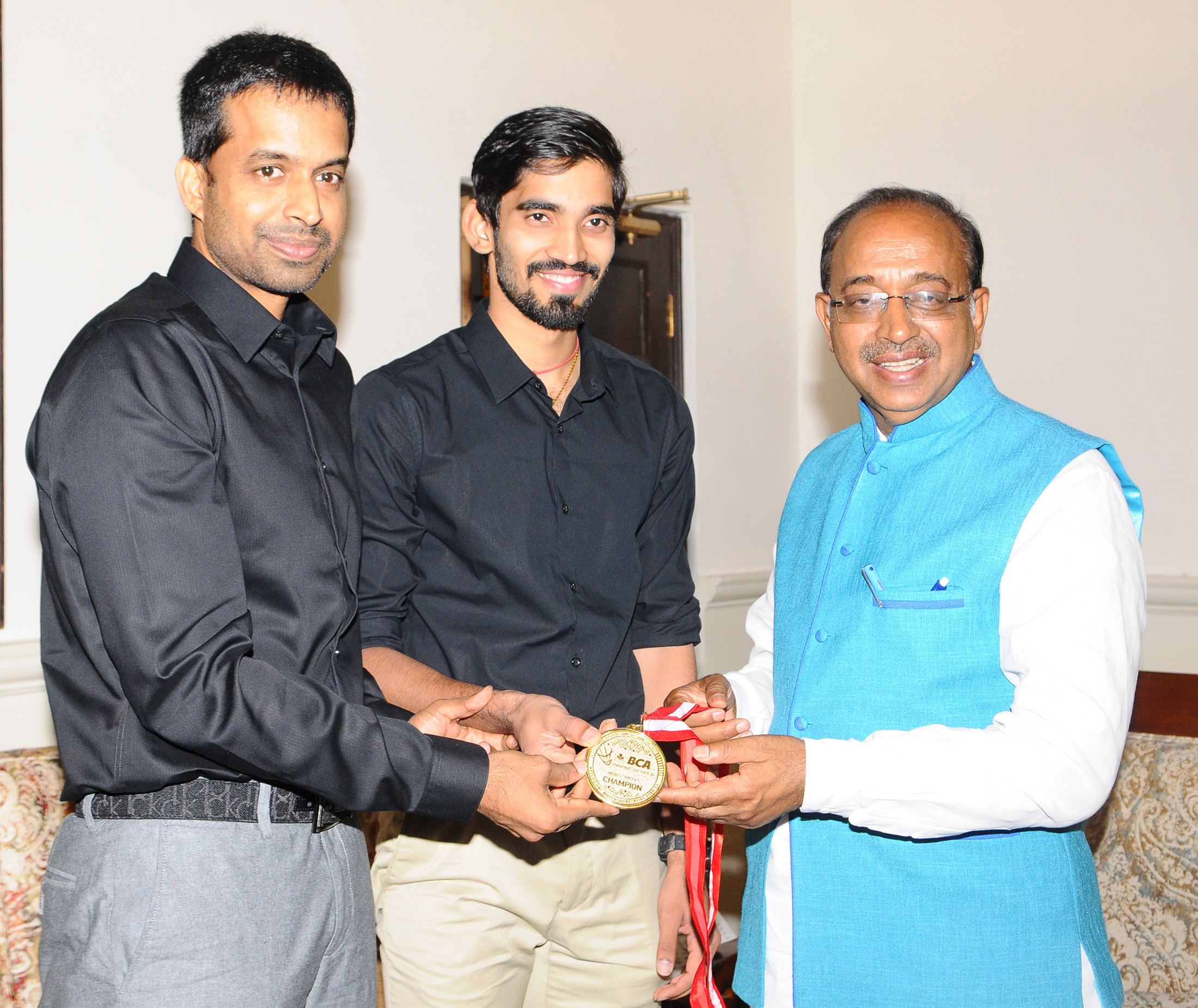
Pullela (left) and Srikanth Kidambi (middle) with the Minister of Sports and Youth Affairs Vijay Goel, c. 2017.

After retiring from his playing career, Pullela founded the Gopichand Badminton Academy in 2008 after reportedly mortgaging his own house. Nimmagadda Prasad, a renowned industrialist, donated ₹50 million (equivalent to ₹170 million or US$1.8 million in 2023) on a condition that his academy win a medal for India at the Olympics in badminton. The academy produced several badminton players including Saina Nehwal, P. V. Sindhu, Sai Praneeth, Parupalli Kashyap, Srikanth Kidambi, Arundhati Pantawane, Gurusai Datt, and Arun Vishnu. Saina Nehwal went on to win the bronze medal at the 2012 Summer Olympics, while P. V. Sindhu went on to win the silver medal at the 2016 Summer Olympics, the bronze medal at the pandemic-hit 2020 Summer Olympics, and also became the first Indian to win the gold medal at the BWF World Championships. Pullela also served as the official Indian Olympic Badminton Team coach at the 2016 Rio Olympics held in Brazil.

== Contributions to Indian athletics ==
In 2003, Pullela started promoting running through a 10K run Foundation by arranging the annual run also conducting training programmes for budding athletes. To help some of the poorer athletes, he arranged weekly runs and giving cash prizes to participants. He tied up with National Athletics Coach Nagpuri Ramesh to train and mentor these budding athletes. He also tied up with the Mytrah Group, a renewable energy company and started the Gopichand-Mytrah Foundation. The foundation identifies talented athletes and trains them, along with providing them with accommodation, food and transportation.

The efforts have been successful with a number of their athletes earning national and international medals, like Deepthi Jeevanji (World record holder in the 400m T20 category), Nandini Agasara (Bronze medalist in the Heptathlon event of the 2022 Asian Games), Rangali Swathi, Kunja Rajitha (400m Gold Medalist in Indian Youth Games 2022).

== Awards and honours ==
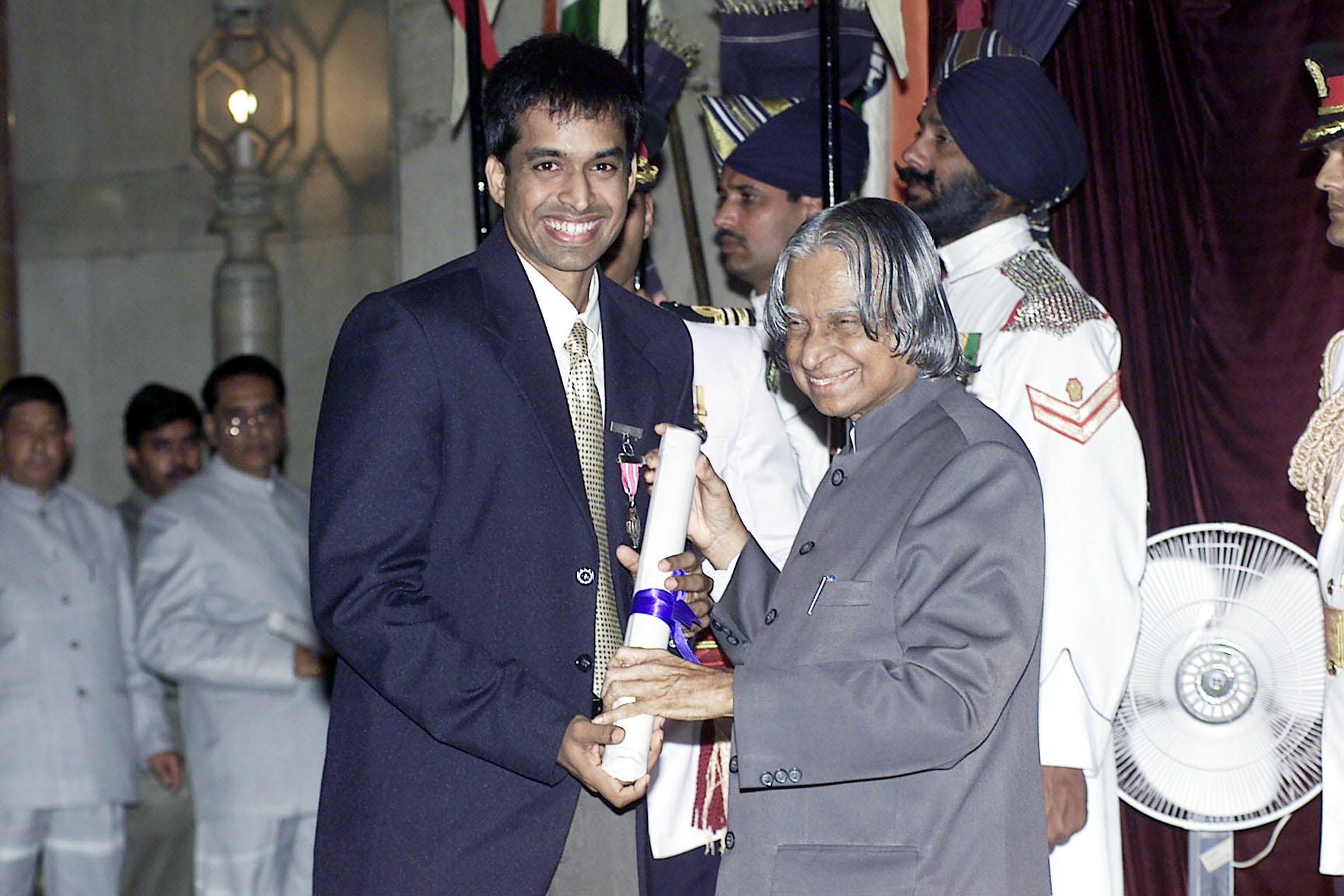
Pullela (left) is awarded the Padma Shri by President A. P. J. Abdul Kalam, c. 2005.

- Arjuna Award, 1999.
- Major Dhyan Chand Khel Ratna, 2001
- Padma Shri, 2005
- Dronacharya Award, 2009
- Padma Bhushan, 2014
- Rashtriya Khel Protsahan Puruskar, 2013, under Category Establishment and Management of Sports Academies of Excellence- Pullela Gopichand Academy of Badminton, Hyderabad
- He was bestowed upon an honorary doctorate by IIT Kanpur on the occasion of their 52nd Convocation.
- Shuttler's Flick: Making Every Match Count - biographical book

Rewards for Coaching the 2016 Rio Summer Olympics silver medallist P. V. Sindhu

- ₹10 million (US$100,000) from the Government of Telangana
- ₹1 million (US$10,000) from Badminton Association of India
- ₹5 million (US$52,000) from the Government of Andhra Pradesh

== Personal life ==
Pullela married fellow badminton player P. V. V. Lakshmi on 5 June 2002. They have two children, daughter Gayatri Gopichand, who is a women's doubles badminton player, and son Vishnu.

In Dec 2020, he launched guided meditation sessions for athletes named "Dhyana for Sports" in the App Dhyana. The sessions have been designed by him based on his experience training athletes. He is also the Director of Dhyana. Dhyana, in collaboration with Heartfulness Institute, was the official meditation partner of the Indian Olympic Association’s (IOA) for Tokyo 2020 Olympic games.
