= Madhumita Bisht =

Indian badminton player

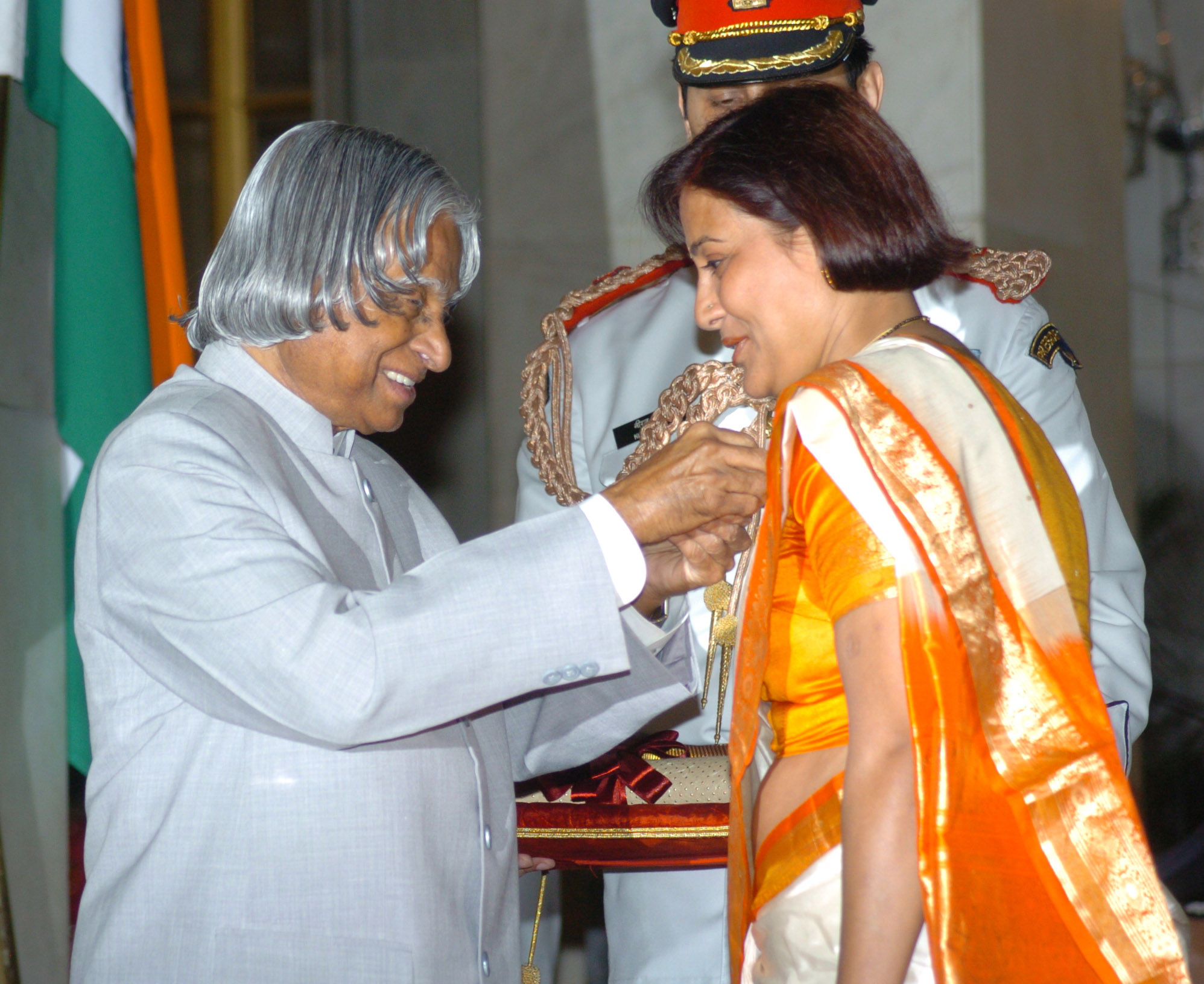

Personal information
- Born: 5 October 1964 (age 61) West Bengal, India
- Height: 5 ft 3 in (160 cm)

Sport
- Country: India
- Sport: Badminton
- Handedness: Right

Women's singles, Women's doubles, Mixed doubles
- Highest ranking: 28 (1992)
Medal record
Representing India
Women's badminton
Commonwealth Games
Bronze medal – third place	1998 Kuala lumpur	Women's team
Asian Games
Bronze medal – third place	1982 New Delhi	Women's Team

Madhumita Bisht (born Madhumita Goswami on 5 October 1964 at Jalpaiguri) is an Indian former badminton player from West Bengal. She is an eight-time National singles champion, nine-time doubles winner and a twelve-time mixed doubles winner. She represented India in the 1992 Olympics in Women's singles discipline.

== Awards ==
- She received the Arjuna Award in 1982.
- Madhumita is recipient of the Padma Shri Award (2006).
