= Archana Deodhar =

Indian badminton player

Personal information
- Born: February 2, 1971 (age 54)
Medal record
Representing India
Women's badminton
Commonwealth Games
Bronze medal – third place	1998 Kuala Lumpur	Women's team

Archana Deodhar (born 2 February 1971) is an Indian former badminton player. She was the bronze medalist in badminton at the 1998 Commonwealth Games in the Women's Team event. She was the coach of national women's badminton team.

== Career ==
Deodhar has won five national doubles titles at Indian National Badminton Championship.
