= 2010 World Weightlifting Championships – Women's 53 kg =

The women's competition in the featherweight (– 53 kg) division was held on 18 September 2010.

== Schedule ==
Date	Time	Event
17 September 2010	12:00	Group C
18 September 2010	09:30	Group B
18 September 2010	15:00	Group A

== Medalists ==
Event	Gold		Silver		Bronze	
Snatch	Chen Xiaoting (CHN)	100 kg	Yuderqui Contreras (DOM)	93 kg	Aylin Daşdelen (TUR)	90 kg
Clean & Jerk	Chen Xiaoting (CHN)	122 kg	Aylin Daşdelen (TUR)	121 kg	Hiromi Miyake (JPN)	113 kg
Total	Chen Xiaoting (CHN)	222 kg	Aylin Daşdelen (TUR)	211 kg	Yuderqui Contreras (DOM)	206 kg

== Records ==
Prior to this competition, the existing world records were as follows.

World Record	Snatch	Ri Song-hui (PRK)	102 kg	Busan, South Korea	1 October 2002
World Record	Clean & Jerk	Li Ping (CHN)	129 kg	Tai'an, China	22 April 2007
World Record	Total	Qiu Hongxia (CHN)	226 kg	Santo Domingo, Dominican	2 October 2006

== Results ==
Rank	Athlete	Group	Body weight	Snatch (kg)				Clean & Jerk (kg)				Total
Rank	Athlete	Group	Body weight	1	2	3	Rank	1	2	3	Rank	Total
1st place, gold medalist(s)	Chen Xiaoting (CHN)	A	52.84	92	97	100	1st place, gold medalist(s)	~~120~~	120	122	1st place, gold medalist(s)	222
2nd place, silver medalist(s)	Aylin Daşdelen (TUR)	A	52.89	~~90~~	90	~~94~~	3rd place, bronze medalist(s)	115	117	121	2nd place, silver medalist(s)	211
3rd place, bronze medalist(s)	Yuderqui Contreras (DOM)	A	52.78	91	93	~~96~~	2nd place, silver medalist(s)	110	113	~~115~~	6	206
4	Citra Febrianti (INA)	B	52.19	84	~~88~~	88	4	105	110	113	4	201
5	Hiromi Miyake (JPN)	A	49.55	84	86	87	5	110	112	113	3rd place, bronze medalist(s)	200
6	Rusmeris Villar (COL)	A	52.64	85	~~88~~	~~88~~	10	107	110	113	5	198
7	Svetlana Cheremshanova (KAZ)	A	52.95	82	87	~~92~~	7	110	~~115~~	~~115~~	8	197
8	Pensiri Laosirikul (THA)	A	50.17	85	~~89~~	~~89~~	8	~~110~~	110	~~113~~	7	195
9	Hsu Shu-ching (TPE)	A	52.80	~~87~~	~~87~~	87	6	~~106~~	106	~~111~~	11	193
10	Julia Rohde (GER)	A	52.41	83	85	~~86~~	9	104	107	~~110~~	9	192
11	Elen Grigoryan (ARM)	B	52.47	~~80~~	80	~~85~~	12	103	106	~~108~~	10	186
12	Fang Li-chun (TPE)	B	52.63	~~77~~	77	80	13	99	103	~~107~~	12	183
13	Marilou Dozois-Prévost (CAN)	B	52.90	80	84	~~86~~	11	98	~~101~~	~~104~~	15	182
14	Sherjana Ruci (ALB)	B	52.96	75	~~80~~	80	14	95	~~100~~	100	14	180
15	Mariya Vidlyvana (UKR)	B	52.58	76	79	~~81~~	15	93	~~96~~	96	16	175
16	Tatiana Vásquez (ECU)	B	52.94	~~72~~	72	75	16	92	98	100	13	175
17	Minati Sethi (IND)	C	52.90	~~71~~	~~71~~	71	17	~~94~~	94	~~96~~	18	165
18	Ayşegül Çoban (TUR)	B	52.87	~~68~~	~~68~~	68	19	92	95	~~98~~	17	163
19	Dana Berchi (ROU)	C	52.88	~~68~~	68	~~70~~	20	87	~~89~~	89	19	157
20	Lena Berntsson (SWE)	C	52.96	~~66~~	66	69	18	84	~~88~~	88	20	157
21	Zilola Burieva (UZB)	C	53.00	60	64	67	22	80	83	~~85~~	21	150
22	Christina Ejstrup (DEN)	C	52.87	65	67	~~69~~	21	77	79	~~81~~	22	146
23	Konstantina Benteli (GRE)	C	52.58	62	~~67~~	~~67~~	23	73	77	~~80~~	23	139
24	Alia Ali Al-Balooshi (UAE)	C	52.73	~~40~~	40	42	24	55	~~60~~	~~60~~	24	97
—	Yu Weili (HKG)	A	52.41	~~85~~	~~85~~	85	—	105	~~110~~	~~110~~	—	—
—	Lely Burgos (PUR)	C	50.29	70	73	75	—	90	~~94~~	~~94~~	—	—
—	Erdenebatyn Erdenetuyaa (MGL)	C	52.99	~~60~~	~~60~~	~~60~~	—	—	—	—	—	—
