= 2011 World Weightlifting Championships – Women's 53 kg =

The women's competition in the bantamweight (– 53 kg) division was held on 6 November 2011.

== Schedule ==
Date	Time	Event
6 November 2011	08:00	Group C
6 November 2011	12:30	Group B
6 November 2011	17:00	Group A

== Medalists ==
Event	Gold		Silver		Bronze	
Snatch	Zulfiya Chinshanlo (KAZ)	97 kg	Yuderqui Contreras (DOM)	95 kg	Hsu Shu-ching (TPE)	93 kg
Clean & Jerk	Zulfiya Chinshanlo (KAZ)	130 kg	Aylin Daşdelen (TUR)	126 kg	Ji Jing (CHN)	121 kg
Total	Zulfiya Chinshanlo (KAZ)	227 kg	Aylin Daşdelen (TUR)	219 kg	Ji Jing (CHN)	214 kg

== Records ==
Prior to this competition, the existing world records were as follows.

World Record	Snatch	Li Ping (CHN)	103 kg	Guangzhou, China	14 November 2010
World Record	Clean & Jerk	Li Ping (CHN)	129 kg	Tai'an, China	22 April 2007
World Record	Total	Li Ping (CHN)	230 kg	Guangzhou, China	14 November 2010

== Results ==
Rank	Athlete	Group	Body weight	Snatch (kg)				Clean & Jerk (kg)				Total
Rank	Athlete	Group	Body weight	1	2	3	Rank	1	2	3	Rank	Total
1st place, gold medalist(s)	Zulfiya Chinshanlo (KAZ)	A	52.67	93	97	~~100~~	1st place, gold medalist(s)	120	126	130	1st place, gold medalist(s)	227
2nd place, silver medalist(s)	Aylin Daşdelen (TUR)	A	52.72	88	91	93	4	120	122	126	2nd place, silver medalist(s)	219
3rd place, bronze medalist(s)	Ji Jing (CHN)	A	52.93	93	~~98~~	~~99~~	5	121	~~127~~	~~127~~	3rd place, bronze medalist(s)	214
4	Hsu Shu-ching (TPE)	A	52.68	90	93	~~95~~	3rd place, bronze medalist(s)	112	117	120	4	213
5	Yuderqui Contreras (DOM)	A	52.56	91	95	~~97~~	2nd place, silver medalist(s)	111	~~116~~	~~116~~	9	206
6	Hiromi Miyake (JPN)	A	50.14	85	~~88~~	88	8	~~113~~	113	115	5	203
7	Sin Chol-ok (PRK)	A	52.73	~~85~~	85	~~91~~	13	115	~~122~~	~~123~~	6	200
8	Boyanka Kostova (AZE)	A	52.96	88	92	~~96~~	6	108	~~115~~	~~115~~	13	200
9	Yu Weili (HKG)	A	52.81	~~85~~	87	~~90~~	11	~~110~~	110	112	8	199
10	Pramsiri Bunphithak (THA)	A	52.52	83	~~87~~	87	9	110	~~113~~	~~113~~	10	197
11	Yoon Jin-hee (KOR)	A	52.75	87	~~90~~	~~90~~	10	105	110	~~112~~	11	197
12	Sopita Tanasan (THA)	B	52.75	83	87	90	7	103	106	~~110~~	16	196
13	Chinenye Fidelis (NGR)	B	52.85	80	~~86~~	~~86~~	19	~~115~~	115	~~120~~	7	195
14	Julia Rohde (GER)	A	52.56	~~83~~	83	85	12	~~105~~	105	106	15	191
15	Inmara Henríquez (VEN)	B	52.99	76	79	81	18	100	105	110	12	191
16	Joanna Łochowska (POL)	A	53.00	~~83~~	~~83~~	83	15	103	~~105~~	107	14	190
17	Misaki Gushiken (JPN)	B	52.88	~~85~~	85	~~87~~	14	98	101	104	17	189
18	Fatma Ebru Pekmezci (TUR)	B	52.69	78	80	82	16	98	100	~~102~~	19	182
19	Marilou Dozois-Prévost (CAN)	B	52.67	~~79~~	79	81	17	98	~~102~~	~~102~~	21	179
20	Hilary Katzenmeier (USA)	B	52.18	75	~~78~~	~~78~~	22	94	96	98	20	173
21	Santoshi Matsa (IND)	B	52.42	70	73	75	27	90	94	96	22	171
22	Virginie Andrieux (FRA)	B	52.55	~~74~~	74	77	20	94	~~97~~	~~97~~	25	171
23	Jennifer Lombardo (ITA)	B	52.94	68	72	76	21	88	93	~~96~~	27	169
24	Izabella Yaylyan (ARM)	C	52.27	71	~~75~~	75	24	89	93	~~96~~	26	168
25	Dewi Safitri (INA)	C	51.40	~~72~~	72	~~77~~	29	~~95~~	~~95~~	95	23	167
26	Rosane Santos (BRA)	C	52.37	~~75~~	75	~~80~~	26	88	~~91~~	92	28	167
27	Manon Lorentz (FRA)	B	52.57	74	~~76~~	~~76~~	28	84	87	90	29	164
28	Pramila Krisani (IND)	C	52.40	63	68	~~71~~	30	85	90	94	24	162
29	Sri Dwi Rahayu (INA)	C	52.21	~~70~~	70	75	23	~~85~~	85	~~93~~	30	160
30	Anna Athanasiadou (GRE)	C	52.35	71	75	~~77~~	25	81	85	~~87~~	31	160
31	Dagmar Kutliková (SVK)	C	52.10	63	66	~~68~~	31	77	81	84	32	150
32	Christina Ejstrup (DEN)	C	52.21	65	~~68~~	~~68~~	33	78	80	82	34	147
—	Lena Berntsson (SWE)	C	52.95	66	~~69~~	~~69~~	32	~~84~~	~~84~~	~~85~~	—	—
—	Francia Peñuñuri (MEX)	B	52.93	~~80~~	~~80~~	~~80~~	—	97	102	~~106~~	18	—
—	Sini Kukkonen (FIN)	C	52.97	~~70~~	~~70~~	~~70~~	—	~~83~~	83	~~86~~	33	—
DQ	Raihan Yusoff (MAS)	C	52.64	70	75	77	—	90	~~93~~	94	—	—

== New records ==
Clean & Jerk	130 kg	Zulfiya Chinshanlo (KAZ)	WR
