= 2009 World Weightlifting Championships – Women's 53 kg =

The women's competition in the featherweight (– 53 kg) division was staged on November 22, 2009.

== Schedule ==
Date	Time	Event
22 November 2009	11:00	Group B
22 November 2009	16:00	Group A

== Medalists ==
Event	Gold		Silver		Bronze	
Snatch	Chen Xiaoting (CHN)	95 kg	Yoon Jin-hee (KOR)	93 kg	Svetlana Cheremshanova (KAZ)	92 kg
Clean & Jerk	Zulfiya Chinshanlo (KAZ)	129 kg	Chen Xiaoting (CHN)	123 kg	Yoon Jin-hee (KOR)	116 kg
Total	Zulfiya Chinshanlo (KAZ)	219 kg	Chen Xiaoting (CHN)	218 kg	Yoon Jin-hee (KOR)	209 kg

== Records ==
Prior to this competition, the existing world records were as follows.

World Record	Snatch	Ri Song-hui (PRK)	102 kg	Busan, South Korea	1 October 2002
World Record	Clean & Jerk	Li Ping (CHN)	129 kg	Tai'an, China	22 April 2007
World Record	Total	Qiu Hongxia (CHN)	226 kg	Santo Domingo, Dominican	2 October 2006

== Results ==
Rank	Athlete	Group	Body weight	Snatch (kg)				Clean & Jerk (kg)				Total
Rank	Athlete	Group	Body weight	1	2	3	Rank	1	2	3	Rank	Total
1st place, gold medalist(s)	Zulfiya Chinshanlo (KAZ)	A	52.99	~~87~~	87	90	5	120	125	129	1st place, gold medalist(s)	219
2nd place, silver medalist(s)	Chen Xiaoting (CHN)	A	52.51	~~93~~	~~93~~	95	1st place, gold medalist(s)	118	123	~~127~~	2nd place, silver medalist(s)	218
3rd place, bronze medalist(s)	Yoon Jin-hee (KOR)	A	52.64	93	~~95~~	~~96~~	2nd place, silver medalist(s)	113	116	~~119~~	3rd place, bronze medalist(s)	209
4	Yuderqui Contreras (DOM)	A	52.63	88	91	~~92~~	4	106	111	~~114~~	6	202
5	Svetlana Cheremshanova (KAZ)	A	52.99	85	~~90~~	92	3rd place, bronze medalist(s)	~~110~~	110	~~115~~	8	202
6	Aylin Daşdelen (TUR)	A	52.79	~~83~~	83	~~86~~	10	115	~~118~~	~~119~~	5	198
7	Emine Bilgin (TUR)	A	52.84	80	83	86	6	103	107	110	7	196
8	Rusmeris Villar (COL)	A	52.75	82	85	~~87~~	8	105	109	~~112~~	9	194
9	Yu Weili (HKG)	B	52.63	85	~~90~~	~~90~~	7	105	~~110~~	~~110~~	11	190
10	Joanna Łochowska (POL)	A	52.87	~~83~~	83	~~86~~	11	103	~~106~~	106	10	189
11	Valiantsina Liakhavets (BLR)	B	52.68	~~80~~	80	~~84~~	13	98	102	~~106~~	12	182
12	Marilou Dozois-Prévost (CAN)	B	52.83	80	84	~~86~~	9	98	~~102~~	~~104~~	13	182
13	Misaki Gushiken (JPN)	B	52.76	78	81	~~84~~	12	94	~~98~~	~~98~~	15	175
14	Regina Mavlyutova (RUS)	B	52.93	73	~~78~~	78	14	~~95~~	95	~~100~~	14	173
15	Lena Berntsson (SWE)	B	52.99	67	70	~~72~~	17	86	~~90~~	90	16	160
16	Sarah Davis (USA)	B	52.87	72	~~74~~	~~74~~	16	87	~~90~~	~~90~~	17	159
17	Zilola Burieva (UZB)	B	52.36	58	~~62~~	~~62~~	18	~~73~~	73	77	18	135
18	Lam Wai Yee (HKG)	B	51.06	22	~~24~~	24	19	25	28	30	19	54
—	Svetlana Ulyanova (RUS)	B	52.81	75	~~80~~	~~80~~	15	—	—	—	—	—
—	Fang Li-chun (TPE)	A	52.17	~~87~~	~~87~~	~~87~~	—	115	~~117~~	~~117~~	4	—
—	Prapawadee Jaroenrattanatarakoon (THA)	A	52.45	~~90~~	~~90~~	~~90~~	—	—	—	—	—	—
