= 2007 World Weightlifting Championships – Women's 53 kg =

The women's competition in 53 kg division was staged on September 19–20, 2007.

== Schedule ==
Date	Time	Event
19 September 2007	20:00	Group C
20 September 2007	14:30	Group B
20 September 2007	17:00	Group A

== Medalists ==
Event	Gold		Silver		Bronze	
Snatch	Yoon Jin-hee (KOR)	94 kg	Nastassia Novikava (BLR)	94 kg	Li Ping (CHN)	93 kg
Clean & Jerk	Li Ping (CHN)	126 kg	Nastassia Novikava (BLR)	119 kg	Yoon Jin-hee (KOR)	117 kg
Total	Li Ping (CHN)	219 kg	Nastassia Novikava (BLR)	213 kg	Yoon Jin-hee (KOR)	207 kg

== Records ==
Prior to this competition, the existing world records were as follows.

World Record	Snatch	Ri Song-hui (PRK)	102 kg	Busan, South Korea	1 October 2002
World Record	Clean & Jerk	Li Ping (CHN)	129 kg	Tai'an, China	22 April 2007
World Record	Total	Qiu Hongxia (CHN)	226 kg	Santo Domingo, Dominican	2 October 2006

== Results ==
Rank	Athlete	Group	Body weight	Snatch (kg)				Clean & Jerk (kg)				Total
Rank	Athlete	Group	Body weight	1	2	3	Rank	1	2	3	Rank	Total
1st place, gold medalist(s)	Li Ping (CHN)	A	52.70	93	~~96~~	~~96~~	3rd place, bronze medalist(s)	120	126	~~134~~	1st place, gold medalist(s)	219
2nd place, silver medalist(s)	Nastassia Novikava (BLR)	A	52.83	90	94	~~97~~	2nd place, silver medalist(s)	117	~~119~~	119	2nd place, silver medalist(s)	213
3rd place, bronze medalist(s)	Yoon Jin-hee (KOR)	A	52.61	~~90~~	90	94	1st place, gold medalist(s)	110	115	117	3rd place, bronze medalist(s)	211
4	Yu Weili (HKG)	B	52.05	85	90	~~93~~	6	110	115	~~117~~	4	205
5	Sin Chol-ok (PRK)	A	52.63	83	88	90	7	~~115~~	~~115~~	115	5	205
6	Suda Chaleephay (THA)	A	52.37	88	~~92~~	92	5	112	~~117~~	~~117~~	8	204
7	Ri Hyon-ok (PRK)	A	52.42	83	86	89	8	113	~~117~~	~~117~~	6	202
8	Im Jyoung-hwa (KOR)	A	52.48	80	85	87	9	106	113	~~117~~	7	200
9	Svetlana Ulyanova (RUS)	A	52.11	80	84	~~86~~	11	105	110	~~112~~	9	194
10	Ana Margot Lemos (COL)	B	52.90	~~80~~	80	84	12	102	106	109	11	193
11	Okta Dwi Pramita (INA)	A	52.67	~~86~~	86	~~89~~	10	~~106~~	~~106~~	106	14	192
12	Melanie Roach (USA)	B	52.75	74	77	79	17	105	107	110	10	189
13	Nataliya Trotsenko (UKR)	B	52.59	~~83~~	~~83~~	83	14	101	~~104~~	~~105~~	17	184
14	Judith Chacón (VEN)	C	52.86	77	~~80~~	~~80~~	22	100	105	107	13	184
15	Soumaya Fatnassi (TUN)	A	51.73	83	~~86~~	~~86~~	13	100	~~106~~	~~106~~	20	183
16	María de la Puente (ESP)	B	52.25	80	~~84~~	~~85~~	15	95	100	~~103~~	21	180
17	Inmara Henríquez (VEN)	B	52.87	76	~~78~~	~~78~~	24	100	~~104~~	104	15	180
18	Malwina Rowińska (POL)	B	52.76	76	~~78~~	~~78~~	23	101	103	~~105~~	16	179
19	Nguyễn Bích Hà (VIE)	C	50.64	78	~~82~~	~~82~~	18	95	100	~~104~~	19	178
20	Jackelina Heredia (COL)	B	52.42	~~77~~	77	~~80~~	20	100	~~105~~	~~105~~	22	177
21	Virginie Andrieux (FRA)	B	52.63	77	~~79~~	~~79~~	21	99	~~102~~	~~102~~	23	176
22	Dika Toua (PNG)	B	52.61	74	~~78~~	~~78~~	30	96	~~101~~	101	18	175
23	Lin Tsu-ling (TPE)	C	52.62	75	~~78~~	78	19	95	~~100~~	~~100~~	25	173
24	Hidam Shaya Devi (IND)	C	52.56	75	~~79~~	~~79~~	28	92	95	~~98~~	24	170
25	Maria Pipiliaridou (GRE)	C	52.91	70	~~75~~	75	29	90	95	~~99~~	27	170
26	Marilou Dozois-Prévost (CAN)	C	52.03	72	75	~~77~~	25	90	93	~~95~~	29	168
27	Oxana Zolotaryova (KAZ)	C	52.28	65	71	75	26	87	90	92	31	167
28	Anna Govelyan (ARM)	B	52.53	75	~~79~~	~~79~~	27	91	~~96~~	~~96~~	32	166
29	Francia Peñuñuri (MEX)	C	52.88	~~70~~	~~70~~	70	32	~~90~~	90	95	26	165
30	Estelle Lechat (FRA)	C	52.00	70	~~73~~	~~73~~	31	90	~~92~~	92	30	162
31	Tehmina Karapetyan (ARM)	C	52.94	67	~~71~~	—	34	90	94	~~96~~	28	161
32	Sini Kukkonen (FIN)	C	52.88	68	~~71~~	~~71~~	33	85	~~88~~	88	33	156
—	Prapawadee Jaroenrattanatarakoon (THA)	A	52.85	93	~~96~~	~~96~~	4	—	—	—	—	—
—	Sarah Blasnik (GER)	B	52.78	~~78~~	78	80	16	—	—	—	—	—
—	Yuderqui Contreras (DOM)	A	52.84	~~92~~	~~92~~	~~93~~	—	107	~~114~~	~~114~~	12	—
DQ	Hnin Thant Zin (MYA)	B	51.86	73	77	~~80~~	—	94	101	105	—	—
