= 2003 World Weightlifting Championships – Women's 53 kg =

The 2003 World Weightlifting Championships were held in Vancouver, Canada from 14 November to 22 November. The women's 53 kilograms division was staged on 15 and 16 November 2003.

== Schedule ==
Date	Time	Event
15 November 2003	13:30	Group C
16 November 2003	15:00	Group B
16 November 2003	17:30	Group A

== Medalists ==
Event	Gold		Silver		Bronze	
Snatch	Udomporn Polsak (THA)	100.0 kg	Junpim Kuntatean (THA)	97.5 kg	Ri Song-hui (PRK)	95.0 kg
Clean & Jerk	Ri Song-hui (PRK)	127.5 kg	Udomporn Polsak (THA)	122.5 kg	Junpim Kuntatean (THA)	120.0 kg
Total	Udomporn Polsak (THA)	222.5 kg	Ri Song-hui (PRK)	222.5 kg	Junpim Kuntatean (THA)	217.5 kg

== Records ==
Prior to this competition, the existing world records were as follows.

World Record	Snatch	Ri Song-hui (PRK)	102.5 kg	Busan, South Korea	1 October 2002
World Record	Clean & Jerk	Li Xuejiu (CHN)	127.5 kg	Warsaw, Poland	20 November 2002
World Record	Total	Yang Xia (CHN)	225.0 kg	Sydney, Australia	18 September 2000

== Results ==
Rank	Athlete	Group	Body weight	Snatch (kg)				Clean & Jerk (kg)				Total
Rank	Athlete	Group	Body weight	1	2	3	Rank	1	2	3	Rank	Total
1st place, gold medalist(s)	Udomporn Polsak (THA)	A	52.52	95.0	~~100.0~~	100.0	1st place, gold medalist(s)	120.0	122.5	~~125.0~~	2nd place, silver medalist(s)	222.5
2nd place, silver medalist(s)	Ri Song-hui (PRK)	A	52.68	~~95.0~~	95.0	~~97.5~~	3rd place, bronze medalist(s)	122.5	~~127.5~~	127.5	1st place, gold medalist(s)	222.5
3rd place, bronze medalist(s)	Junpim Kuntatean (THA)	A	52.52	92.5	~~97.5~~	97.5	2nd place, silver medalist(s)	117.5	~~120.0~~	120.0	3rd place, bronze medalist(s)	217.5
4	Raema Lisa Rumbewas (INA)	A	52.40	~~85.0~~	85.0	87.5	6	110.0	~~115.0~~	115.0	4	202.5
5	Mabel Mosquera (COL)	A	52.14	~~85.0~~	87.5	90.0	4	110.0	~~115.0~~	~~115.0~~	5	200.0
6	Nandini Devi (IND)	A	52.68	85.0	87.5	90.0	5	110.0	~~112.5~~	~~112.5~~	6	200.0
7	Sanamacha Chanu (IND)	A	52.74	77.5	80.0	82.5	9	102.5	107.5	~~110.0~~	7	190.0
8	Marioara Munteanu (ROM)	A	52.81	85.0	~~90.0~~	~~92.5~~	7	100.0	~~105.0~~	105.0	11	190.0
9	Yoon Jin-hee (KOR)	B	52.90	80.0	~~82.5~~	82.5	10	100.0	105.0	107.5	8	190.0
10	Kumie Matsumiya (JPN)	B	51.80	75.0	80.0	82.5	8	~~102.5~~	102.5	105.0	10	187.5
11	Hiromi Miyake (JPN)	B	51.17	75.0	80.0	~~82.5~~	11	100.0	~~105.0~~	105.0	9	185.0
12	Ana Margot Lemos (COL)	B	52.35	75.0	77.5	~~80.0~~	14	95.0	100.0	102.5	13	180.0
13	Yuderqui Contreras (DOM)	B	52.89	77.5	~~82.5~~	~~82.5~~	15	100.0	102.5	~~105.0~~	14	180.0
14	Natallia Radukhouskaya (BLR)	B	52.65	75.0	80.0	~~82.5~~	12	92.5	~~97.5~~	97.5	18	177.5
15	Estefanía Juan (ESP)	B	51.54	77.5	~~82.5~~	~~82.5~~	13	97.5	~~100.0~~	~~100.0~~	17	175.0
16	Virginie Lachaume (FRA)	B	52.08	~~75.0~~	~~75.0~~	75.0	16	97.5	100.0	~~102.5~~	15	175.0
17	Ryu Sun-nam (PRK)	C	52.81	70.0	~~75.0~~	~~75.0~~	23	~~97.5~~	97.5	100.0	16	170.0
18	Mai Magdi (EGY)	B	52.79	75.0	~~80.0~~	~~80.0~~	18	90.0	92.5	~~95.0~~	22	167.5
19	Nastassia Novikava (BLR)	C	52.79	65.0	70.0	75.0	17	90.0	~~95.0~~	~~95.0~~	23	165.0
20	Patience Lawal (NGR)	C	51.03	70.0	~~75.0~~	~~75.0~~	20	92.5	—	—	19	162.5
21	Dika Toua (PNG)	C	52.30	65.0	70.0	~~72.5~~	21	87.5	92.5	~~95.0~~	21	162.5
22	Anna Czermińska (POL)	C	51.99	~~67.5~~	67.5	~~70.0~~	24	87.5	90.0	92.5	20	160.0
23	Laura Núñez (ESP)	C	52.69	65.0	~~70.0~~	70.0	22	85.0	87.5	~~90.0~~	24	157.5
24	Marina Reyes (MEX)	C	52.74	67.5	~~70.0~~	—	25	~~87.5~~	87.5	—	25	155.0
25	Enrica De Luca (ITA)	C	48.50	60.0	62.5	~~65.0~~	26	70.0	75.0	~~77.5~~	26	137.5
26	Marie Nováčková (CZE)	C	52.64	62.5	~~65.0~~	~~65.0~~	27	70.0	75.0	~~77.5~~	27	137.5
27	Ip Wing Yuk (HKG)	C	52.55	25.0	~~32.5~~	~~32.5~~	28	35.0	42.5	~~47.5~~	28	67.5
—	Heidi Neubacher (AUT)	B	52.80	~~75.0~~	~~75.0~~	~~75.0~~	—	—	—	—	—	—
—	Supeni Wasiman (INA)	A	52.89	~~85.0~~	~~85.0~~	~~85.0~~	—	~~105.0~~	105.0	~~110.0~~	12	—
—	Karla Fernández (VEN)	C	53.00	75.0	~~80.0~~	~~80.0~~	19	~~90.0~~	~~90.0~~	~~90.0~~	—	—
