= Weightlifting at the 2006 Asian Games – Women's 53 kg =

Women's 53 kg at the 2006 Asian Games
- Venue: Al-Dana Banquet Hall
- Date: 2 December 2006
- Competitors: 13 from 10 nations

Medalists
gold medal	Li Ping	China
silver medal	Junpim Kuntatean	Thailand
bronze medal	Yu Weili	Hong Kong

The women's 53 kilograms event at the 2006 Asian Games took place on 2 December 2006 at Al-Dana Banquet Hall in Doha.

== Schedule ==
All times are Arabia Standard Time (UTC+03:00)

Date	Time	Event
Saturday, 2 December 2006	16:00	Group A

== Records ==
Prior to this competition, the existing world, Asian and Games records were as follows.

World Record	Snatch	Ri Song-hui (PRK)	102 kg	Busan, South Korea	1 October 2002
World Record	Clean & Jerk	Qiu Hongxia (CHN)	128 kg	Santo Domingo, Dominican Rep.	2 October 2006
World Record	Total	Qiu Hongxia (CHN)	226 kg	Santo Domingo, Dominican Rep.	2 October 2006
Asian Record	Snatch	Ri Song-hui (PRK)	102 kg	Busan, South Korea	1 October 2002
Asian Record	Clean & Jerk	Qiu Hongxia (CHN)	128 kg	Santo Domingo, Dominican Rep.	2 October 2006
Asian Record	Total	Qiu Hongxia (CHN)	226 kg	Santo Domingo, Dominican Rep.	2 October 2006
Games Record	Snatch	Ri Song-hui (PRK)	102 kg	Busan, South Korea	1 October 2002
Games Record	Clean & Jerk	Ri Song-hui (PRK)	122 kg	Busan, South Korea	1 October 2002
Games Record	Total	Ri Song-hui (PRK)	225 kg	Busan, South Korea	1 October 2002

== Results ==
Legend

- NM — No mark

Rank	Athlete	Group	Body weight	Snatch (kg)				Clean & Jerk (kg)				Total
Rank	Athlete	Group	Body weight	1	2	3	Result	1	2	3	Result	Total
1st place, gold medalist(s)	Li Ping (CHN)	A	52.74	93	~~98~~	98	98	123	126	~~129~~	126	224
2nd place, silver medalist(s)	Junpim Kuntatean (THA)	A	51.91	92	~~97~~	97	97	120	124	~~127~~	124	221
3rd place, bronze medalist(s)	Yu Weili (HKG)	A	52.06	90	~~95~~	~~95~~	90	115	117	~~120~~	117	207
4	Raema Lisa Rumbewas (INA)	A	52.59	92	~~95~~	~~95~~	92	~~115~~	~~115~~	115	115	207
5	Suda Chaleephay (THA)	A	52.63	90	~~95~~	~~95~~	90	110	~~117~~	~~118~~	110	200
6	Okta Dwi Pramita (INA)	A	52.47	~~85~~	85	~~90~~	85	105	~~110~~	~~110~~	105	190
7	Fang Hsin-tzu (TPE)	A	52.38	~~80~~	~~80~~	80	80	100	106	~~110~~	106	186
8	Kumie Matsumiya (JPN)	A	52.66	70	74	76	76	102	~~105~~	~~106~~	102	178
9	Oxana Zolotaryova (KAZ)	A	52.60	67	72	75	75	87	92	95	95	170
10	Hidilyn Diaz (PHI)	A	52.73	67	70	72	72	82	88	90	90	162
11	Lazzat Kashkulina (KAZ)	A	52.16	67	72	~~75~~	72	87	~~92~~	~~95~~	87	159
12	Elina Aslanova (UZB)	A	52.94	55	~~60~~	~~60~~	55	65	70	75	75	130
—	Sin Chol-ok (PRK)	A	52.63	~~87~~	~~87~~	~~87~~	—	—	—	—	—	NM

== New records ==
The following records were established during the competition.

Clean & Jerk	126	Li Ping (CHN)	GR
