= 2005 World Weightlifting Championships – Women's 53 kg =

The 2005 World Weightlifting Championships were held in Doha, Qatar from 9 November to 17 November. The women's 53 kilograms division was staged on 10 November 2005.

== Schedule ==
Date	Time	Event
10 November 2005	13:00	Group B
10 November 2005	17:30	Group A

== Medalists ==
Event	Gold		Silver		Bronze	
Snatch	Junpim Kuntatean (THA)	98 kg	Li Ping (CHN)	98 kg	Yuderqui Contreras (DOM)	95 kg
Clean & Jerk	Li Ping (CHN)	126 kg	Junpim Kuntatean (THA)	125 kg	Suda Chaleephay (THA)	116 kg
Total	Li Ping (CHN)	224 kg	Junpim Kuntatean (THA)	223 kg	Yuderqui Contreras (DOM)	211 kg

== Records ==
Prior to this competition, the existing world records were as follows.

World record	Snatch	Ri Song-hui (PRK)	102 kg	Busan, South Korea	1 October 2002
World record	Clean & Jerk	Li Xuejiu (CHN)	127 kg	Warsaw, Poland	20 November 2002
World record	Total	Yang Xia (CHN)	225 kg	Sydney, Australia	18 September 2000

== Results ==
Rank	Athlete	Group	Body weight	Snatch (kg)				Clean & Jerk (kg)				Total
Rank	Athlete	Group	Body weight	1	2	3	Rank	1	2	3	Rank	Total
1st place, gold medalist(s)	Li Ping (CHN)	A	52.84	94	~~98~~	98	2nd place, silver medalist(s)	123	126	~~131~~	1st place, gold medalist(s)	224
2nd place, silver medalist(s)	Junpim Kuntatean (THA)	A	52.32	95	~~98~~	98	1st place, gold medalist(s)	120	125	~~130~~	2nd place, silver medalist(s)	223
3rd place, bronze medalist(s)	Yuderqui Contreras (DOM)	A	52.84	89	91	95	3rd place, bronze medalist(s)	110	113	116	4	211
4	Suda Chaleephay (THA)	A	52.26	~~90~~	~~90~~	90	4	110	114	116	3rd place, bronze medalist(s)	206
5	Fang Hsin-tzu (TPE)	A	52.50	83	86	~~88~~	6	109	~~114~~	~~114~~	5	195
6	Marioara Munteanu (ROM)	A	52.80	81	85	89	5	100	105	~~108~~	8	194
7	Maryse Turcotte (CAN)	A	53.00	80	~~83~~	~~83~~	8	108	~~111~~	~~111~~	6	188
8	Ana Margot Lemos (COL)	B	52.60	77	80	~~83~~	7	102	~~107~~	107	7	187
9	Fetie Kasaj (ALB)	A	52.60	78	~~81~~	~~81~~	10	~~104~~	~~104~~	104	9	182
10	Malwina Rowińska (POL)	B	52.49	75	~~78~~	~~79~~	11	~~100~~	100	103	10	178
11	Henrietta Ráki (HUN)	B	52.22	65	70	~~72~~	12	80	85	~~90~~	12	155
12	Kate Howard (WAL)	B	52.44	57	~~59~~	~~59~~	14	74	~~76~~	76	13	133
13	Firoga Parvin (BAN)	B	52.16	~~55~~	55	57	13	~~65~~	~~65~~	65	14	122
—	Dika Toua (PNG)	A	52.33	~~77~~	79	~~83~~	9	~~105~~	~~105~~	~~105~~	—	—
—	Soumaya Fatnassi (TUN)	A	52.58	~~80~~	~~80~~	~~83~~	—	100	~~104~~	~~105~~	11	—
