= 2015 World Weightlifting Championships – Women's 53 kg =

Women's 53 kilograms event

The women's 53 kilograms event at the 2015 World Weightlifting Championships was held on 21 and 22 November 2015 in Houston, United States.

== Schedule ==
Date	Time	Event
21 November 2015	11:00	Group C
21 November 2015	21:30	Group B
22 November 2015	14:55	Group A

== Medalists ==
Event	Gold		Silver		Bronze	
Snatch	Chen Xiaoting (CHN)	101 kg	Hsu Shu-ching (TPE)	96 kg	Hidilyn Diaz (PHI)	96 kg
Clean & Jerk	Hsu Shu-ching (TPE)	125 kg	Chen Xiaoting (CHN)	120 kg	Hidilyn Diaz (PHI)	117 kg
Total	Hsu Shu-ching (TPE)	221 kg	Chen Xiaoting (CHN)	221 kg	Hidilyn Diaz (PHI)	213 kg

== Records ==
Prior to this competition, the existing world records were as follows.

World Record	Snatch	Li Ping (CHN)	103 kg	Guangzhou, China	14 November 2010
World Record	Clean & Jerk	Zulfiya Chinshanlo (KAZ)	134 kg	Almaty, Kazakhstan	10 November 2014
World Record	Total	Hsu Shu-ching (TPE)	233 kg	Incheon, South Korea	21 September 2014

== Results ==
Rank	Athlete	Group	Body weight	Snatch (kg)				Clean & Jerk (kg)				Total
Rank	Athlete	Group	Body weight	1	2	3	Rank	1	2	3	Rank	Total
1st place, gold medalist(s)	Hsu Shu-ching (TPE)	A	52.61	~~96~~	96	~~101~~	2nd place, silver medalist(s)	~~120~~	120	125	1st place, gold medalist(s)	221
2nd place, silver medalist(s)	Chen Xiaoting (CHN)	A	52.78	97	101	~~104~~	1st place, gold medalist(s)	~~120~~	~~120~~	120	2nd place, silver medalist(s)	221
3rd place, bronze medalist(s)	Hidilyn Diaz (PHI)	A	52.97	94	96	~~100~~	3rd place, bronze medalist(s)	115	117	~~121~~	3rd place, bronze medalist(s)	213
4	Sopita Tanasan (THA)	A	50.34	90	95	~~100~~	4	110	~~115~~	115	5	210
5	Rattanaphon Pakkaratha (THA)	A	52.97	83	86	89	7	111	~~116~~	116	4	205
6	Margarita Yelisseyeva (KAZ)	A	52.82	82	88	90	6	107	112	~~115~~	7	202
7	Marina Sisoeva (UZB)	A	52.66	88	~~92~~	~~92~~	8	108	112	~~116~~	6	200
8	Iulia Paratova (UKR)	A	52.72	90	~~93~~	~~93~~	5	105	108	~~112~~	10	198
9	Ana Margot Lemos (COL)	A	52.74	~~85~~	85	~~87~~	11	105	~~109~~	109	9	194
10	Rebeka Koha (LAT)	A	52.49	84	86	87	9	101	105	~~107~~	16	192
11	Génesis Rodríguez (VEN)	A	52.90	~~87~~	~~87~~	87	10	105	~~109~~	~~109~~	18	192
12	Ayşegül Çoban (TUR)	A	52.38	75	80	~~82~~	19	107	111	~~116~~	8	191
13	Kanae Yagi (JPN)	B	52.46	81	~~84~~	84	12	~~104~~	104	107	12	191
14	Rusmeris Villar (COL)	B	52.72	82	~~85~~	~~85~~	18	105	108	~~110~~	11	190
15	Sema Acartürk (TUR)	B	52.36	~~79~~	79	82	17	102	~~106~~	106	14	188
16	Yoon Jin-hee (KOR)	C	52.42	75	80	83	15	98	103	105	15	188
17	María Sierra (VEN)	B	52.53	75	~~80~~	80	20	100	103	105	17	185
18	Syarah Anggraini (INA)	B	52.59	80	84	~~86~~	13	101	~~105~~	~~105~~	23	185
19	Santoshi Matsa (IND)	B	51.84	78	~~82~~	~~82~~	23	102	106	~~108~~	13	184
20	Dika Toua (PNG)	B	52.81	76	~~80~~	80	22	103	~~106~~	~~109~~	20	183
21	Lola Kadirova (UZB)	B	52.85	80	84	~~87~~	14	95	~~99~~	99	25	183
22	Atenery Hernández (ESP)	C	52.60	77	80	~~82~~	21	97	100	102	22	182
23	Erika Yamasaki (AUS)	B	52.49	78	82	83	16	98	~~102~~	~~102~~	26	181
24	Dewi Safitri (INA)	B	52.27	74	~~77~~	77	24	99	102	~~105~~	21	179
25	Giorgia Russo (ITA)	C	52.56	~~74~~	74	~~78~~	29	94	99	104	19	178
26	Yafreisy Silvestre (DOM)	B	52.70	76	~~80~~	~~80~~	28	97	~~101~~	101	24	177
27	Basma Ibrahim (EGY)	C	52.64	73	76	~~78~~	26	92	95	~~100~~	27	171
28	Anna Govelyan (ARM)	B	52.69	~~76~~	76	~~80~~	27	94	~~98~~	~~98~~	28	170
29	Aksana Zalatarova (ISR)	C	52.77	72	75	77	25	87	90	~~92~~	31	167
30	Yu Weili (HKG)	C	52.47	70	~~75~~	~~75~~	33	85	90	93	29	163
31	Wioleta Jastrzębska (POL)	C	51.68	~~70~~	70	~~74~~	31	88	90	92	30	162
32	Gansereeteriin Baasanjargal (MGL)	C	52.54	68	73	~~75~~	30	75	~~84~~	84	36	157
33	Niulis González (CUB)	C	51.70	67	70	~~73~~	32	85	~~90~~	~~90~~	33	155
34	Scarleth Mercado (NCA)	C	52.99	65	~~70~~	~~70~~	37	85	90	~~93~~	32	155
35	Oyuuntungalagiin Bayartsetseg (MGL)	C	52.79	68	~~72~~	~~72~~	34	85	~~90~~	~~90~~	34	153
36	Sini Kukkonen (FIN)	C	51.75	~~66~~	67	~~69~~	35	84	~~88~~	~~88~~	35	151
37	Christina Ejstrup (DEN)	C	52.69	65	~~67~~	~~68~~	36	83	~~85~~	~~86~~	37	148
38	Sofía Rito (URU)	C	52.94	64	~~67~~	~~67~~	38	83	~~85~~	~~86~~	38	147
—	Kimberly Taguacta (GUM)	C	52.58	~~60~~	~~60~~	~~60~~	—	~~80~~	~~80~~	~~80~~	—	—
