= Weightlifting at the 2008 Summer Olympics – Women's 53 kg =

Women's 53 kg at the Games of the XXIX Olympiad
- Venue: Beihang University Gymnasium
- Date: 10 August 2008
- Competitors: 9 from 9 nations

Medalists
1st place, gold medalist(s)		Prapawadee Jaroenrattanatarakoon	Thailand
2nd place, silver medalist(s)		Yoon Jin-hee	South Korea
3rd place, bronze medalist(s)		Raema Lisa Rumbewas	Indonesia

The women's 53 kilograms weightlifting event was the second-lightest women's event at the weightlifting competition, limiting competitors to a maximum of 53 kilograms of body mass. The whole competition took place on August 10 at 15:30. This event was the second weightlifting event to conclude.

Each lifter performed in both the snatch and clean and jerk lifts, with the final score being the sum of the lifter's best result in each. The athlete received three attempts in each of the two lifts; the score for the lift was the heaviest weight successfully lifted.

== Schedule ==
All times are China Standard Time (UTC+08:00)

Date	Time	Event
10 August 2008	15:30	Group A

== Records ==
{{{caption}}}
World Record	Snatch	Ri Song-hui (PRK)	102 kg	Busan, South Korea	1 October 2002
World Record	Clean & Jerk	Li Ping (CHN)	129 kg	Tai'an, China	22 April 2007
World Record	Total	Qiu Hongxia (CHN)	226 kg	Santo Domingo, Dominican	2 October 2006
Olympic Record	Snatch	Yang Xia (CHN)	100 kg	Sydney, Australia	18 September 2000
Olympic Record	Clean & Jerk	Yang Xia (CHN)	125 kg	Sydney, Australia	18 September 2000
Olympic Record	Total	Yang Xia (CHN)	225 kg	Sydney, Australia	18 September 2000

== Results ==
Rank	Athlete	Group	Body weight	Snatch (kg)				Clean & Jerk (kg)				Total
Rank	Athlete	Group	Body weight	1	2	3	Result	1	2	3	Result	Total
1st place, gold medalist(s)	Prapawadee Jaroenrattanatarakoon (THA)	A	52.47	92	95	~~97~~	95	120	126	~~130~~	126	221
2nd place, silver medalist(s)	Yoon Jin-hee (KOR)	A	52.72	94	~~97~~	~~97~~	94	116	118	119	119	213
3rd place, bronze medalist(s)	Raema Lisa Rumbewas (INA)	A	52.95	91	~~95~~	~~95~~	91	110	115	~~121~~	115	206
4	Yuderqui Contreras (DOM)	A	52.74	89	93	~~96~~	93	111	~~118~~	~~120~~	111	204
5	Melanie Roach (USA)	A	52.54	79	81	83	83	105	108	110	110	193
6	Julia Rohde (GER)	A	52.79	77	80	82	82	99	103	~~105~~	103	185
7	Dika Toua (PNG)	A	52.53	~~77~~	77	80	80	104	~~108~~	~~108~~	104	184
8	Judith Chacón (VEN)	A	52.96	~~75~~	75	80	80	101	~~106~~	~~106~~	101	181
DQ	Nastassia Novikava (BLR)	A	52.87	92	95	~~97~~	95	~~116~~	116	118	118	~~213~~

- Nastassia Novikava of Belarus originally finished third, but was disqualified after she tested positive for oral turinabol and stanozolol.

== New records ==
Clean & Jerk	126 kg	Prapawadee Jaroenrattanatarakoon (THA)	OR
