= Weightlifting at the 2010 Asian Games – Women's 53 kg =

Women's 53 kg at the 2010 Asian Games
- Venue: Dongguan Arena
- Date: 14 November 2010
- Competitors: 10 from 9 nations

Medalists
gold medal	Li Ping	China
silver medal	Zulfiya Chinshanlo	Kazakhstan
bronze medal	Prapawadee Jaroenrattanatarakoon	Thailand

The women's 53 kilograms event at the 2010 Asian Games took place on 14 November 2010 at Dongguan Arena.

== Schedule ==
All times are China Standard Time (UTC+08:00)

Date	Time	Event
Sunday, 14 November 2010	14:30	Group B
Sunday, 14 November 2010	19:00	Group A

== Records ==
Prior to this competition, the existing world, Asian and Games records were as follows.

World Record	Snatch	Ri Song-hui (PRK)	102 kg	Busan, South Korea	1 October 2002
World Record	Clean & Jerk	Li Ping (CHN)	129 kg	Tai'an, China	22 April 2007
World Record	Total	Qiu Hongxia (CHN)	226 kg	Santo Domingo, Dominican Rep.	2 October 2006
Asian Record	Snatch	Ri Song-hui (PRK)	102 kg	Busan, South Korea	1 October 2002
Asian Record	Clean & Jerk	Li Ping (CHN)	129 kg	Tai'an, China	22 April 2007
Asian Record	Total	Qiu Hongxia (CHN)	226 kg	Santo Domingo, Dominican Rep.	2 October 2006
Games Record	Snatch	Ri Song-hui (PRK)	102 kg	Busan, South Korea	1 October 2002
Games Record	Clean & Jerk	Li Ping (CHN)	126 kg	Doha, Qatar	2 December 2006
Games Record	Total	Ri Song-hui (PRK)	225 kg	Busan, South Korea	1 October 2002

== Results ==
Legend

- NM — No mark

Rank	Athlete	Group	Body weight	Snatch (kg)				Clean & Jerk (kg)				Total
Rank	Athlete	Group	Body weight	1	2	3	Result	1	2	3	Result	Total
1st place, gold medalist(s)	Li Ping (CHN)	A	52.64	96	100	103	103	123	127	~~130~~	127	230
2nd place, silver medalist(s)	Zulfiya Chinshanlo (KAZ)	A	52.58	90	95	97	97	122	~~130~~	~~130~~	122	219
3rd place, bronze medalist(s)	Prapawadee Jaroenrattanatarakoon (THA)	A	52.80	92	~~95~~	~~95~~	92	120	123	~~125~~	123	215
4	Citra Febrianti (INA)	B	52.78	~~85~~	86	89	89	106	110	113	113	202
5	Yu Weili (HKG)	A	52.29	85	~~90~~	90	90	107	~~112~~	~~112~~	107	197
6	Hsu Shu-ching (TPE)	B	52.56	85	~~88~~	88	88	105	108	~~111~~	108	196
7	Hiromi Miyake (JPN)	A	50.03	83	85	~~87~~	85	105	—	—	105	190
8	Aye Thanda Lwin (MYA)	B	50.82	82	~~85~~	~~85~~	82	~~100~~	100	105	105	187
9	Nguyễn Thị Thúy (VIE)	B	52.44	~~75~~	~~75~~	75	75	105	~~110~~	~~112~~	105	180
—	Fang Li-chun (TPE)	B	52.80	~~80~~	80	~~83~~	80	~~103~~	~~103~~	~~103~~	—	NM

== New records ==
The following records were established during the competition.

Snatch	103	Li Ping (CHN)	WR
Clean & Jerk	127	Li Ping (CHN)	GR
Total	226	Li Ping (CHN)	GR
Total	230	Li Ping (CHN)	WR
