= Ji Jing =

Ji Jing may refer to:

- King Xuan of Zhou (died 782 BC), personal name Ji Jing
- Ji Jing (weightlifter) (born 1987), Chinese weightlifter
