= Marioara Munteanu =

Romanian weightlifter (born 1978)

Personal information
- Full name: Marioara Munteanu
- Born: 13 July 1978 (age 47) Brăila, Romania
- Height: 165 cm (5 ft 5 in)
- Weight: 52.80 kg (116.4 lb)

Sport
- Country: Romania
- Sport: Weightlifting
- Weight class: 53 kg
- Team: National team
- Updated on 13 September 2016

Marioara Munteanu (born 13 July 1978 in Brăila) is a Romanian weightlifter, competing in the 53 kg category and representing Romania at international competitions.

She participated at the 2000 Summer Olympics in the 53 kg event finishing eighth and at the 2004 Summer Olympics in the 53 kg event finishing fourth. She competed at world championships, most recently at the 2005 World Weightlifting Championships.

== Major results ==
Year	Venue	Weight	Snatch (kg)				Clean & Jerk (kg)				Total	Rank
Year	Venue	Weight	1	2	3	Rank	1	2	3	Rank	Total	Rank
Summer Olympics
2004	Athens, Italy	53 kg				—N/a				—N/a		4
2000	Sydney, Australia	53 kg				—N/a				—N/a		8
World Championships
2005	Doha, Qatar	53 kg	81	85	89	5	100	105	~~108~~	8	194.0	6
2003	Vancouver, Canada	53 kg	85	~~90~~	~~92.5~~	7	100	~~105~~	105	11	190	8
