= Chen Xiaoting =

Chinese weightlifter (born 1991)

Medal record

Women's Weightlifting

Representing China

World Championships
| Gold medal – first place | 2010 Antalya | – 53 kg |
| Silver medal – second place | 2009 Goyang | – 53 kg |
| Silver medal – second place | 2015 Houston | –53 kg |

Chen Xiaoting (born 11 January 1991) is a Chinese weightlifter.
