= Prapawadee Jaroenrattanatarakoon =

Thai weightlifter (born 1984)

Prapawadee Jaroenrattanatarakoon TM TBh ChCh
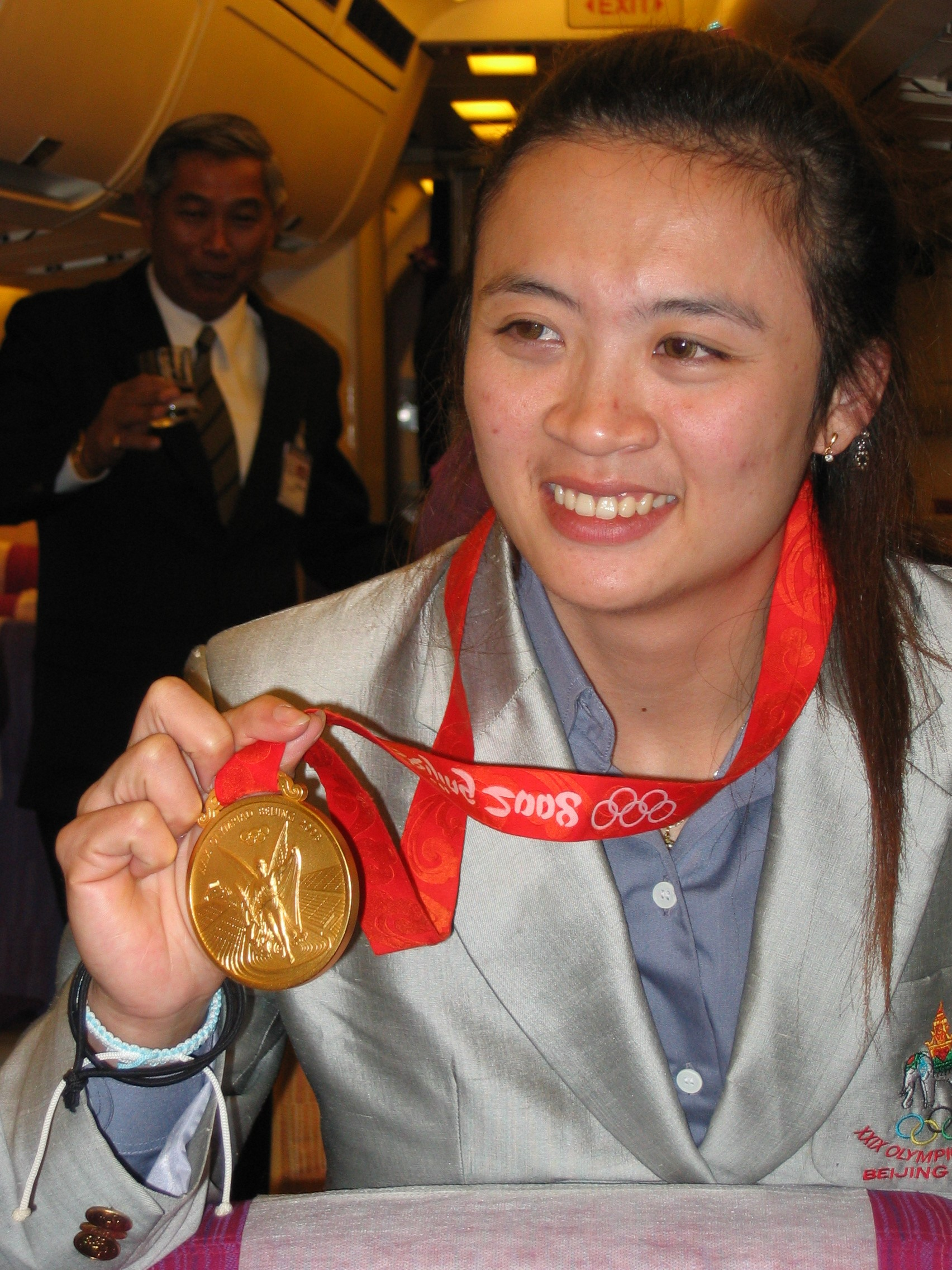

Personal information
- Nationality: Thailand
- Born: May 29, 1984 (age 42) Nakhon Sawan, Thailand
- Height: 157 cm (5 ft 2 in)
- Weight: 52.72 kg (116.2 lb)

Sport
- Country: Thailand
- Sport: Weightlifting
- Event: 53 kg

Achievements and titles
- Personal bests: Snatch: 98 kg (2005); Clean and jerk: 126 kg (2008); Total: 223 kg (2005)
Medal record
Representing Thailand
Event	1st	2nd	3rd
Olympic Games	1	0	0
World Weightlifting Championships	0	1	1
Asian Games	0	1	1
Asian Weightlifting Championships	1	2	1
Total	2	4	2
Women's weightlifting
Olympic Games
Gold medal – first place	2008 Beijing	53 kg
World Championships
Silver medal – second place	2005 Doha	53 kg
Bronze medal – third place	2003 Vancouver	53 kg
Asian Games
Silver medal – second place	2006 Doha	53 kg
Bronze medal – third place	2010 Guangzhou	53 kg
Asian Championships
Gold medal – first place	2005 Dubai	53 kg
Silver medal – second place	2004 Almaty	53 kg
Silver medal – second place	2007 Shandong	53 kg
Bronze medal – third place	2009 Taldykorgan	53 kg

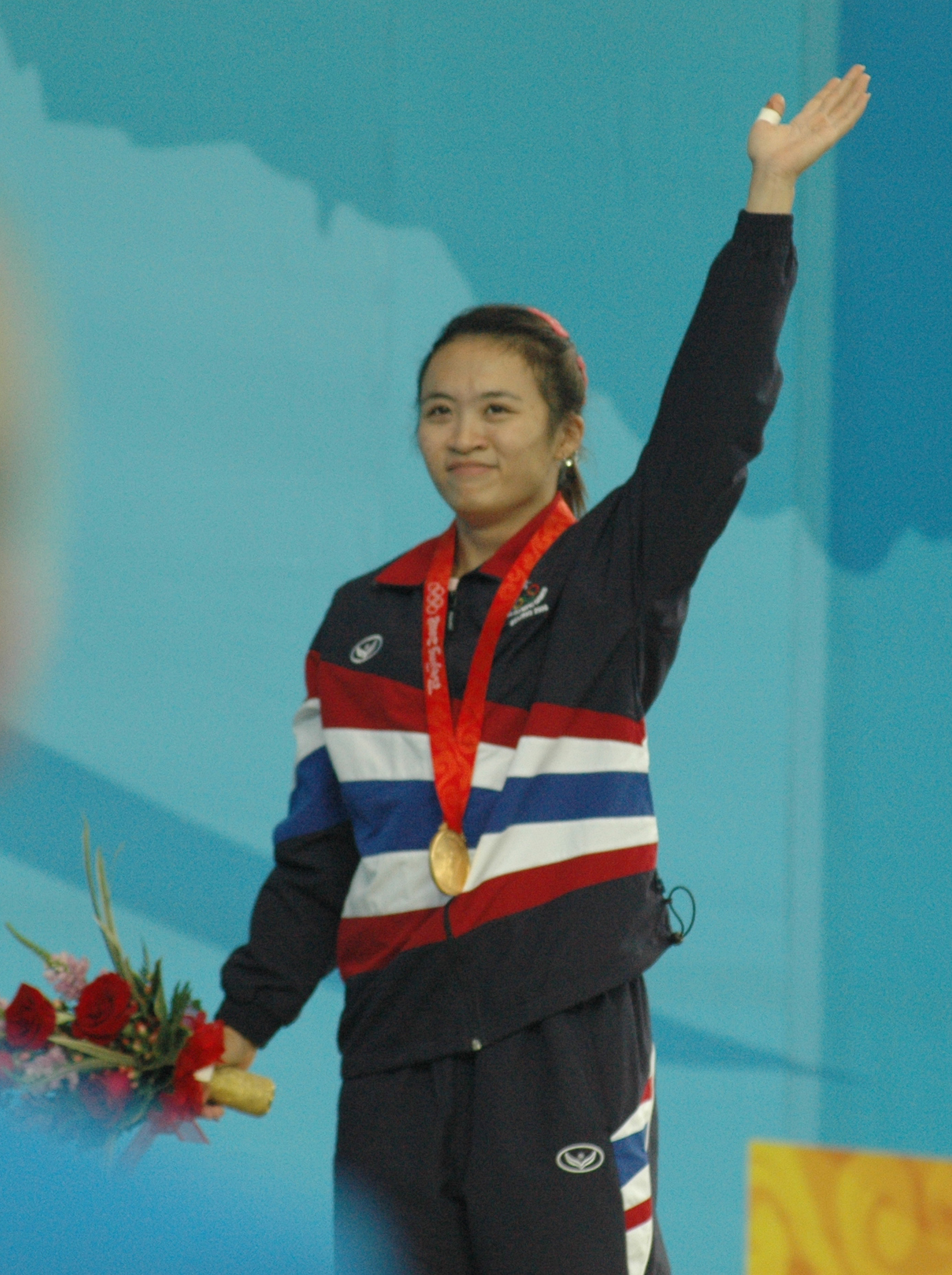
She won the women's 53 kg class at the Beijing 2008 Summer Olympics.

Prapawadee Jaroenrattanatarakoon (Thai: ประภาวดี เจริญรัตนธารากูล; RTGS: Praphawadi Charoenrattanatharakun) (born Junpim Kuntatean, Thai: จันทร์พิมพ์ กันทะเตียน; RTGS: Chanphim Kanthatian, also transliterated Chanpim Kantatian May 29, 1984) is a weightlifter from Thailand.

At the 2005 World Weightlifting Championships she won the silver medal in the 53 kg category, lifting a total of 223 kg (491.6 lbs). At the 2006 University World Championships she won the gold medal in the 53 kg category.

During the 2007 World Weightlifting Championships she suffered an elbow injury, and had to rest for three months.

She won the women's 53 kg class at the Beijing 2008 Summer Olympics. She changed her name in 2007 on the advice of a fortune teller who said it would improve her chances of winning the Olympics. Her name was so long that it was listed as "J" on the digital scoreboard during the Beijing Games.

== Major results ==
She competed at world championships, most recently at the 2009 World Weightlifting Championships.

Year	Venue	Weight	Snatch (kg)				Clean & Jerk (kg)				Total	Rank
Year	Venue	Weight	1	2	3	Rank	1	2	3	Rank	Total	Rank
Olympic Games
2008	Beijing, China	53 kg	92	95	~~97~~	1	120	126	~~130~~	1	221	1st place, gold medalist(s)
World Championships
2003	Vancouver, Canada	53 kg	92.5	~~97.5~~	97.5	2nd place, silver medalist(s)	117.5	~~120~~	120	3rd place, bronze medalist(s)	217.5	3rd place, bronze medalist(s)
2005	Doha, Qatar	53 kg	95	~~98~~	98	1st place, gold medalist(s)	120	125	~~130~~	2nd place, silver medalist(s)	223.0	2nd place, silver medalist(s)
2007	Chiang Mai, Thailand	53 kg	93	~~96~~	~~96~~	4	--	--	--	--	--	--
2009	Goyang, South Korea	53 kg	~~90~~	~~90~~	~~90~~	--	--	--	--	--	--	--
Asian Games
2002	Busan, South Korea	53 kg	77.5	~~82.5~~	82.5	6	97.5	102.5	105	5	187.5	4
2006	Doha, Qatar	53kg	92	~~97~~	97	2	120	124	~~127~~	2	221	2nd place, silver medalist(s)
2010	Guangzhou, China	53 kg	92	~~95~~	~~95~~	3	120	123	~~125~~	2	215	3rd place, bronze medalist(s)
Asian Championships
2004	Almaty, Kazakhstan	53 kg	97.5			2nd place, silver medalist(s)	125			2nd place, silver medalist(s)	222.5	2nd place, silver medalist(s)
2005	Dubai, United Arab Emirates	53 kg	94			1st place, gold medalist(s)	119			1st place, gold medalist(s)	213	1st place, gold medalist(s)
2007	Tai'an, China	53 kg	96			1st place, gold medalist(s)	122			2nd place, silver medalist(s)	218	2nd place, silver medalist(s)
2009	Taldykorgan, Kazakhstan	53 kg	94			2nd place, silver medalist(s)	120			3rd place, bronze medalist(s)	214	3rd place, bronze medalist(s)
2012	Pyeongtaek, South Korea	53 kg	~~90~~	~~90~~	~~90~~	--	~~113~~	113	116	2nd place, silver medalist(s)	--	--
World Junior Championships
2003	Hermosillo, Mexico	53 kg	90	92.5	95.5	1st place, gold medalist(s)	110	~~115.5~~	115.5	1st place, gold medalist(s)	211	1st place, gold medalist(s)
