= Dewi Safitri =

Indonesian weightlifter (born 1993)

Personal information
- Born: 10 February 1993 (age 33) Bekasi, West Java, Indonesia
- Height: 1.51 m (4 ft 11 in)
- Weight: 52.27 kg (115 lb)

Sport
- Country: Indonesia
- Sport: Weightlifting
Medal record
Women's weightlifting
Representing Indonesia
Islamic Solidarity Games
Silver medal – second place	2017 Baku	–53 kg
Youth Olympic Games
Bronze medal – third place	2010 Singapore	–53 kg

Dewi Safitri (born 10 February 1993) is an Indonesian weightlifter, competing in the 53 kg category and representing Indonesia at international competitions.

She competed at world championships, including at the 2015 World Weightlifting Championships, and the 2016 Summer Olympics.

== Major results ==
Year	Venue	Weight	Snatch (kg)				Clean & jerk (kg)				Total	Rank
Year	Venue	Weight	1	2	3	Rank	1	2	3	Rank	Total	Rank
World Championships
2011	Paris, France	53 kg	~~72~~	72	~~77~~	29	~~95~~	~~95~~	95	23	167	25
2015	Houston, United States	53 kg	74	~~77~~	77	24	99	102	~~105~~	21	179	24
