= Weightlifting at the 2012 Summer Olympics – Qualification =

This article details the Weightlifting at the 2012 Summer Olympics qualifying phase.

The Weightlifting competition at the 2012 Games includes 260 athletes. Each competing nation is allowed to enter a maximum of 10 competitors, 6 men and 4 women. 2010 and 2011 World Weightlifting Championships are the main qualifying events for the 2012 Olympic games. NOCs achieve qualification places according to their position in the joint team classification by points adding those scored in the 2010 and 2011 World Championships. One continental qualification event is held for each continent in 2012. Only NOCs which have not gained quota places in the Main Qualification Events may obtain quota places.

Great Britain, as host country has been allocated three men's quota places and two women's quota places for the London 2012 Olympic Games.

== Qualification timeline ==
Event	Date	Venue
2010 World Championships	September 17–26, 2010	Antalya, Turkey
2011 World Championships	November 5–13, 2011	Paris, France
2012 African Championships	March 30 – April 2, 2012	Nairobi, Kenya
2012 European Championships	April 9–15, 2012	Antalya, Turkey
2012 Asian Championships	April 24–30, 2012	Pyeongtaek, South Korea
2012 Pan-American Championships	May 11–18, 2012	Antigua, Guatemala
2012 Oceania Championships	June 6–9, 2012	Apia, Samoa
Olympic Qualification Ranking List	June 9, 2012	—
Tripartite Commission Invitations	June 26, 2012	—

Individual Ranking events

Event	Date	Venue
IWF Continental Clubs Grand Prix	December 11–16, 2010	Penang, Malaysia
IWF Grand Prix	January 15–17, 2011	Fujian, China
2011 World Junior Championships	June 30 – July 7, 2011	Penang, Malaysia
IWF Grand Prix – President's Cup	December 16–18, 2011	Belgorod, Russia

== Qualification summary ==
NOC	Men	Women	Total
Albania	3	1	4
Algeria	1		1
Armenia	4	2	6
Aruba	1		1
Australia	1	1	2
Azerbaijan	5	1	6
Belarus	4	4	8
Belgium	1		1
Brazil	1	1	2
Bulgaria	1	1	2
Cameroon	1	1	2
Canada		3	3
Chile	1	1	2
China	6	4	10
Chinese Taipei	1	3	4
Colombia	4	4	8
Cook Islands		1	1
Cuba	4		4
Czech Republic	1		1
Dominican Republic		2	2
Ecuador	1	3	4
Egypt	5	3	8
El Salvador	1		1
Federated States of Micronesia	1		1
Fiji	1	1	2
Finland	1		1
France	3	1	4
Georgia	3		3
Germany	3	2	5
Ghana		1	1
Great Britain	3	2	5
Greece	1		1
Guatemala	1	1	2
Honduras	1		1
Hong Kong		1	1
Hungary	1		1
India	1	1	2
Indonesia	5	1	6
Iran	6		6
Iraq	1		1
Italy	1		1
Japan	1	4	5
Kazakhstan	4	4	8
Kenya		1	1
Kiribati	1		1
Kyrgyzstan	1		1
Latvia	1		1
Madagascar		1	1
Mexico	1	1	2
Moldova	1	1	2
Nauru	1		1
New Zealand	1		1
Nicaragua		1	1
Nigeria	1	1	2
North Korea	5	3	8
Palau	1		1
Papua New Guinea	1	1	2
Peru		1	1
Philippines		1	1
Poland	6	3	9
Puerto Rico		1	1
Romania	3	1	4
Russia	6	4	10
Samoa	1	1	2
Saudi Arabia	1		1
Singapore		1	1
Slovakia	1		1
Solomon Islands		1	1
South Africa	1		1
South Korea	6	4	10
Spain	1	1	2
Syria	1	1	2
Thailand	3	4	7
Tunisia	1	1	2
Turkey	5	4	9
Turkmenistan	3		3
Tuvalu	1		1
Uganda	1		1
Ukraine	6	3	9
United Arab Emirates		1	1
United States	1	2	3
Uzbekistan	5	1	6
Venezuela	1	2	3
Vietnam	1	1	2
Total: 84 NOCs	155	104	259

- Albania had 4 male quota places, but use only three. Therefore, one quota remained unused

== Men ==
=== World Championships ===
- Teams 1st–6th: 6 athletes
- Teams 7th–12th: 5 athletes
- Teams 13th–18th: 4 athletes
- Teams 19th–24th: 3 athletes

Rank	Quota	NOC	Year	Category								Subtotal	Total
Rank	Quota	NOC	Year	56	62	69	77	85	94	105	+105	Subtotal	Total
1	6	China	2010	53/2	25/1	/1	25/1	21/1				124/6	261
1	6	China	2011	53/2	28/1	28/1	28/1	/1				137/6	261
2	6	Russia	2010					25/1	50/2	48/2	/1	123/6	258
2	6	Russia	2011					43/2	42/2	28/1	22/1	135/6	258
3	6	Iran	2010			/1	22/1		13/1	13/1	49/2	97/6	233
3	6	Iran	2011			20/1		28/1	35/2		53/2	136/6	233
4	6	South Korea	2010		21/1			17/1	/1	17/1	41/2	96/6	223
4	6	South Korea	2011		19/1		25/1		19/1	21/1	43/2	127/6	223
5	6	Poland	2010		15/1		18/1	28/1	21/1	50/2		132/6	223
5	6	Poland	2011				15/2	23/1	14/1	39/2		91/6	223
6	6	Ukraine	2010					13/1	66/2	15/1	23/2	87/6	207
6	6	Ukraine	2011					15/1	40/2	25/1	40/2	120/6	207
7	5	Egypt	2010		14/1	/1	42/2	14/1			20/1	90/6	196
7	5	Egypt	2011			38/2	22/1	18/1		13/1	15/1	106/6	196
8	5	Uzbekistan	2010	22/1		37/2		36/2		21/1		116/6	191
8	5	Uzbekistan	2011	16/1	4/1	4/1		12/1	21/1	18/1		75/6	191
9	5	North Korea	2010	23/1	28/1	23/1		17/1				91/4	180
9	5	North Korea	2011	20/1	45/2	6/2	18/1					89/6	180
10	5	Turkey	2010		23/2	44/2	13/1	12/1				92/6	171
10	5	Turkey	2011		33/2	36/2	/1		10/1			79/6	171
11	5	Indonesia	2010	30/2	41/2	25/2						96/6	163
11	5	Indonesia	2011	/1	38/2	20/2	9/1					67/6	163
12	5	Azerbaijan	2010			35/2	10/1	5/1	19/1	/1		69/6	162
12	5	Azerbaijan	2011	23/1		42/2		11/2	17/1			93/6	162
13	4	Kazakhstan	2010				/1	/1	29/2	31/2		60/6	158
13	4	Kazakhstan	2011				19/1	16/1	28/2	35/2		98/6	158
14	4	Belarus	2010					23/1	19/2	19/2	16/1	77/6	157
14	4	Belarus	2011					32/2	13/1	20/1	15/2	80/6	157
15	4	Colombia	2010	35/2	17/1	10/1	9/1	15/1				86/6	152
15	4	Colombia	2011	25/2	40/2	1/2						66/6	152
16	4	Cuba	2010	37/2		22/1		22/1	14/1	10/1		105/6	143
16	4	Cuba	2011	21/2		/1	/1	17/1	/1			38/6	143
17	4	Albania	2010	1/1		35/2	20/1		1/2			57/6	133
17	4	Albania	2011			22/2	36/2	11/1	7/1			76/6	133
18	4	Armenia	2010				28/2	/2	15/1	19/1		62/6	131
18	4	Armenia	2011			18/2	40/2				11/2	69/6	131
19	3	Turkmenistan	2010	10/1	33/2	/1		7/1		/1		50/6	125
19	3	Turkmenistan	2011		34/2	15/1		14/2			12/1	75/6	125
20	3	Georgia	2010					9/1	8/2	26/2	15/1	58/6	123
20	3	Georgia	2011			/1		10/1		35/2	20/2	65/6	123
21	3	France	2010	3/1	17/2	/1		18/1				38/5	121
21	3	France	2011		3/1	38/2		31/2	11/1			83/6	121
22	3	Romania	2010		/1	/2	16/1	19/1	23/1			58/6	118
22	3	Romania	2011		9/1	/1	31/2	20/1	/1			60/6	118
23	3	Thailand	2010	/1	28/2	13/1		3/1	6/1			50/6	111
23	3	Thailand	2011	25/2	17/2	5/1	14/1					61/6	111
24	3	Germany	2010				11/1	6/1	7/1	6/1	25/2	55/6	110
24	3	Germany	2011			/1	13/1	14/1		11/1	17/1	55/5	110
25		Moldova	2010	9/2	12/1		27/2		17/1			65/6	102
25		Moldova	2011	9/1	8/1	2/1	/1		18/2			37/6	102
26		Japan	2010	13/2	23/2		4/1				11/1	51/6	93
26		Japan	2011	10/2	17/2		7/1				8/1	42/6	93
27		Venezuela	2010			28/2	8/2	8/1		7/1		51/6	92
27		Venezuela	2011		14/1	10/2			6/1	9/1	2/1	41/6	92
28		Slovakia	2010			9/1	17/2	10/1		16/1	6/1	58/6	72
28		Slovakia	2011			/1	/1			10/1	4/2	14/5	72
29		Lithuania	2010					4/1	23/2	/1	7/1	34/5	69
29		Lithuania	2011					6/2	16/1	13/2	/1	35/6	69
30		Chinese Taipei	2010			7/1			2/1	/2	21/2	30/6	69
30		Chinese Taipei	2011	18/2			3/1			5/1	13/1	39/5	69
31		Ecuador	2010			12/1	8/1			9/1	10/1	39/4	63
31		Ecuador	2011			/1	8/1	/1	/1	15/1	1/1	24/6	63
32		Spain	2010	13/2	10/2	5/1			10/1			38/6	60
32		Spain	2011	10/2	/2		4/1		8/1			22/6	60
33		Greece	2010					1/1	16/2	/1	18/1	35/5	55
33		Greece	2011		1/1		5/1		14/2			20/4	55
34		United States	2010				7/1	2/2		4/2	14/1	27/6	54
34		United States	2011				11/1	8/2		8/1	/2	27/6	54
35		Tunisia	2010	21/1	/1	8/1	21/1		/1			50/5	50
35		Tunisia	2011	/1	/1		/2					0/4	50
36		Hungary	2010	/2				11/1	/1		12/1	23/5	41
36		Hungary	2011							/1	18/1	28/2	41
37		Kyrgyzstan	2010	19/2			/1	/1				19/4	38
37		Kyrgyzstan	2011	19/1				/1				19/2	38
38		India	2010		11/1	6/1				/1	1/2	18/5	32
38		India	2011		2/1	10/2	1/1	1/1			/1	14/6	32
39		Latvia	2010							15/2	/1	15/3	29
39		Latvia	2011							14/1	/1	14/2	29
40		El Salvador	2010	19/2								19/2	29
40		El Salvador	2011	10/2								10/2	29
41		Belgium	2010	14/1								14/1	26
41		Belgium	2011	12/1								12/1	26
42		Czech Republic	2010		2/1				/1	3/2	21/2	26/6	26
42		Czech Republic	2011			/1				/1		0/2	26
43		Brazil	2010				5/1				3/1	8/2	23
43		Brazil	2011				6/2		/1		9/1	15/4	23
44		Vietnam	2010	/1								0/1	22
44		Vietnam	2011	22/2								22/2	22
45		Canada	2010		5/1		/1	/2			9/1	14/5	21
45		Canada	2011			/1		/2	/1		7/2	7/6	21
46		Malaysia	2010										19
46		Malaysia	2011		5/1	14/1						19/2	19
47		Mexico	2010										18
47		Mexico	2011	18/1								18/1	18
48		Nauru	2010										16
48		Nauru	2011								16/1	16/1	16
49		Nigeria	2010										16
49		Nigeria	2011				12/1		4/1			16/2	16
50		Philippines	2010										13
50		Philippines	2011	13/1								13/1	13
51		Federated States of Micronesia	2010										12
51		Federated States of Micronesia	2011		12/1							12/1	12
52		Italy	2010	5/1	3/1	/1	1/1			/1		9/5	9
52		Italy	2011		/1		/1	/1				0/3	9
53		Guatemala	2010								5/1	5/1	8
53		Guatemala	2011			/1					3/1	3/2	8
54		Fiji	2010	2/1								2/1	7
54		Fiji	2011	5/1								5/1	7
55		South Africa	2010		1/1	4/1	/1		/1		/1	5/5	5
55		South Africa	2011										5
56		Samoa	2010										4
56		Samoa	2011						/1	4/1		4/2	4
57		Finland	2010						/1		2/1	2/2	4
57		Finland	2011			/1	2/1		/1		/1	2/4	4
58		Australia	2010										3
58		Australia	2011		/1			/1	3/1		/1	3/4	3
59		Qatar	2010			3/1			/1			3/2	3
59		Qatar	2011										3
60		Chile	2010										3
60		Chile	2011							3/1		3/1	3
61		Kiribati	2010										2
61		Kiribati	2011						2/1			2/1	2
—		Cameroon	2010			/1						0/1	0
—		Cameroon	2011					/1				0/1	0
—		Croatia	2010					/1				0/1	0
—		Croatia	2011					/1			/1	0/2	0
—		Puerto Rico	2010						/1			0/1	0
—		Puerto Rico	2011						/1			0/1	0
—		Ireland	2010		/1		/1					0/2	0
—		Ireland	2011			/1	/1					0/2	0
—		Peru	2010										0
—		Peru	2011						/1			0/1	0
—		Papua New Guinea	2010										0
—		Papua New Guinea	2011					/1				0/1	0
—		American Samoa	2010										0
—		American Samoa	2011		/1							0/1	0
—		Costa Rica	2010										0
—		Costa Rica	2011								/1	0/1	0
—		Palau	2010										0
—		Palau	2011		/1							0/1	0
—		Switzerland	2010				/1					0/1	0
—		Switzerland	2011				/1	/1				0/2	0
—		Tajikistan	2010		/1							0/1	0
—		Tajikistan	2011		/1							0/1	0
—		Tuvalu	2010										0
—		Tuvalu	2011		/1							0/1	0
—		Dominican Republic	2010							/1		0/1	0
—		Dominican Republic	2011										0
—		Uruguay	2010					/1				0/1	0
—		Uruguay	2011										0
—		Iraq	2010	/1		/1	/1	/1	/1	/1		0/6	0
—		Iraq	2011										0
—		Saudi Arabia	2010	/2	/1	/1		/1	/1			0/6	0
—		Saudi Arabia	2011										0
—		Mauritius	2010					/1				0/1	0
—		Mauritius	2011										0

=== African Championships ===
- Teams 1st–5th: 1 athlete

Rank	Quota	NOC	Category								Total
Rank	Quota	NOC	56	62	69	77	85	94	105	+105	Total
1	1	Algeria	28/1			23/1	23/1	25/1	28/1	23/1	150
2	1	Tunisia		28/1	45/2	25/1		28/1		22/1	148
3	1	Cameroon		25/1	45/2	22/1	22/1			28/1	142
4	1	South Africa	25/1	21/1	46/2			22/1	20/1		134
5	1	Nigeria			21/1	28/1	25/1	/1	25/1	25/1	124
6		Uganda	22/1	45/2	14/1	16/1		20/1			117
7		Libya			/1	41/2	28/1	23/1	23/1		115
8		Ghana		20/1	16/1	18/1	19/1		21/1	21/1	115
9		Morocco	23/1	/1	19/1	19/1	/1	21/1			82
10		Kenya	21/1	19/1	15/2	/1	21/1				76
11		Sudan				17/1			22/1		39
12		Seychelles			17/1		20/1				37
13		Mauritius					18/1				18

=== European Championships ===
- Teams 1st–7th: 1 athlete

Rank	Quota	NOC	Category								Total
Rank	Quota	NOC	56	62	69	77	85	94	105	+105	Total
1	1	Moldova	28/1	23/1		53/2	25/1	28/1			157
2	1	Bulgaria	25/1	53/2	53/2	23/1					154
3	1	Hungary		17/1	17/1		28/1	16/1	25/1	25/1	128
4	1	Spain	45/2	19/1		40/2		22/1			126
5	1	Czech Republic			41/2		18/1	18/1	20/1	28/1	125
6	1	Italy	21/1	38/2	43/2	20/1					122
7	1	Greece		21/1		39/2	19/1	42/2			121
8		Lithuania					44/2	23/2	22/1	18/1	107
9		Slovakia	20/1		20/1			19/1	44/2	/1	103
10		Finland	/1	16/1	19/1	18/1	20/1	20/1			93
11		Ireland				29/2	17/1	15/1		17/1	78
12		Croatia				/1	22/1		19/1	22/1	63
13		Latvia							28/1	19/1	47
14		Estonia						21/1		21/1	42
15		Israel								23/1	23
16		Belgium		22/1							22
17		Sweden								20/1	20
18		Cyprus		/1			16/1				16
19		Denmark				16/1					16
20		Netherlands						14/1			14

=== Asian Championships ===
- Teams 1st–7th: 1 athlete

Rank	Quota	NOC	Category								Total
Rank	Quota	NOC	56	62	69	77	85	94	105	+105	Total
1	1	Chinese Taipei	44/2			25/1	25/1		28/1	28/1	150
2	1	Japan		28/1		22/1		28/1	25/1	47/2	150
3	1	Vietnam	53/2		44/2		23/1	19/1			139
4	1	Kyrgyzstan		25/1	22/1	28/1	19/1	23/1		21/1	138
5	1	India	20/1	22/1	28/1	23/1		21/1		20/1	134
6	1	Saudi Arabia	22/1	21/1	20/1		22/1	22/1	23/1		130
7	1	Iraq	19/1	43/2	19/1		28/1			/1	109
8		Malaysia			25/1	41/2	21/1		22/1	/1	109
9		Mongolia	18/1	19/1	31/2	19/1		18/1			105
10		Syria					20/1	45/2	/1	23/1	88
11		United Arab Emirates			27/2	18/1	/1	16/1		18/1	79
12		Qatar				33/2	17/1			17/1	67
13		Kuwait					18/1	17/1		19/1	54
14		Sri Lanka			18/1						18
15		Tajikistan			17/1						17
—		Oman	/1		/1						0
—		Philippines	/1								0

=== Pan-American Championships ===
- Teams 1st–7th: 1 athlete

Rank	Quota	NOC	Category								Total
Rank	Quota	NOC	56	62	69	77	85	94	105	+105	Total
1	1	Ecuador	25/1		25/1		50/2	28/1	28/1		156
2	1	Brazil				28/1		36/2	43/2	28/1	135
3	1	Mexico	28/1		21/1	25/1	20/1	18/1		22/1	134
4	1	United States				22/1	44/2	44/2	22/1		132
5	1	Guatemala	22/1	42/2	23/1					43/2	130
6	1	Venezuela		51/2	28/1		25/1	25/1			129
7	1	Chile	23/1		20/1	18/1		22/1	43/2		126
8		Canada			34/2	20/1	19/1			46/2	119
9		Puerto Rico	20/1		18/1	21/1		19/1	19/1	18/1	115
10		Argentina			22/1		18/1	14/1	38/2	19/1	111
11		Peru	21/1	37/2	17/1		15/1	17/1			107
12		El Salvador	19/2	25/1	16/1	16/1			16/1		92
13		Dominican Republic		21/1		23/1					44
14		Nicaragua				15/1	16/2	13/1			44
15		Panama				19/1	17/1				36
16		Honduras			/1	17/2		15/1			32

=== Oceania Championships ===
- Teams 1st–5th: 1 athlete

Rank	Quota	NOC	Category								Total
Rank	Quota	NOC	56	62	69	77	85	94	105	+105	Total
1	1	Australia		25/1		25/1		25/1	45/2	28/1	148
2	1	Kiribati		17/1	28/1	18/1		28/1	28/1	23/1	142
3	1	Fiji	50/2		25/1	22/1	22/1	22/1			141
4	1	New Zealand		23/1	23/1	20/1	28/1	23/1		22/1	139
5	1	Papua New Guinea	42/2	22/1	22/1	16/1	25/1				127
6		American Samoa			19/1	17/1	21/1	21/1		39/2	117
7		Tonga		16/1	20/1	19/1		19/1	21/1	21/1	116
8		Nauru	25/1	18/1	21/1	21/2				25/1	110
9		Samoa				51/2	23/1	/1	25/2		99
10		Marshall Islands	41/2								41
11		Federated States of Micronesia		28/1							28
12		Palau		21/1							21
13		Tuvalu		20/1							20
14		Vanuatu						20/1			20
15		Solomon Islands		19/1							19

== Women ==
=== World Championships ===
- Teams 1st–9th: 4 athletes
- Teams 10th–16th: 3 athletes
- Teams 17th–21st: 2 athletes

Rank	Quota	NOC	Year	Category							Subtotal	Total
Rank	Quota	NOC	Year	48	53	58	63	69	75	+75	Subtotal	Total
1	4	Russia	2010					28/1	48/2	28/1	104/4	206
1	4	Russia	2011				21/1	28/1	28/1	25/1	102/4	206
2	4	China	2010			28/1		25/1	21/1	25/1	99/4	205
2	4	China	2011	28/1			25/1	25/1		28/1	106/4	205
3	4	Kazakhstan	2010		21/1		28/1		46/2		95/4	196
3	4	Kazakhstan	2011		28/1		28/1		45/2		101/4	196
4	4	Turkey	2010	53/2	28/1		25/1				106/4	188
4	4	Turkey	2011	23/1	25/1	15/1				19/1	82/4	188
5	4	Belarus	2010			25/1	20/1		38/2		83/4	172
5	4	Belarus	2011			28/1		39/2	22/1		89/4	172
6	4	Thailand	2010	23/1	20/1	38/2					81/4	171
6	4	Thailand	2011	47/2	18/1	25/1					90/4	171
7	4	Colombia	2010			19/1	23/1	22/1	19/1		83/4	158
7	4	Colombia	2011			21/1	18/1	18/1	18/1		75/4	158
8	4	South Korea	2010	21/1		16/1	22/1			23/1	82/4	151
8	4	South Korea	2011		17/1	13/1	19/1	20/1			69/4	151
9	4	Japan	2010	15/1	22/1					37/2	74/4	148
9	4	Japan	2011		21/1				16/1	37/2	74/4	148
10	3	Chinese Taipei	2010	22/1	35/2	/1					57/4	139
10	3	Chinese Taipei	2011		23/1	17/1		62/2			82/4	139
11	3	Ukraine	2010			21/1			20/1	36/2	77/4	132
11	3	Ukraine	2011			23/1		32/2		/1	55/4	132
12	3	North Korea	2010	19/1		23/2	21/1				63/4	130
12	3	North Korea	2011			22/2	22/1		23/1		67/4	130
13	3	Poland	2010	20/1		17/1		29/2			66/4	130
13	3	Poland	2011	21/1		16/1	12/1	15/1			64/4	130
14	3	Egypt	2010					19/1	17/1	28/2	64/4	129
14	3	Egypt	2011					13/1	19/1	33/2	65/4	129
15	3	Canada	2010		15/1	12/1		20/1	15/1		62/4	122
15	3	Canada	2011		13/1		33/2	14/1			60/4	122
16	3	Ecuador	2010	9/1	13/1	22/1				21/1	65/4	120
16	3	Ecuador	2011			18/1	10/1	7/1		20/1	55/4	120
17	2	Germany	2010		18/1	13/1		11/1		14/1	56/4	112
17	2	Germany	2011		15/1	14/1			27/2		56/4	112
18	2	Venezuela	2010			14/1		15/1	25/2		54/4	111
18	2	Venezuela	2011	18/1	14/1				25/2		57/4	111
19	2	United States	2010	12/1				13/1	11/1	17/1	53/4	105
19	2	United States	2011			21/2				31/2	52/4	105
20	2	Dominican Republic	2010	11/1	25/1	/1				11/1	47/4	101
20	2	Dominican Republic	2011	21/2	22/1					11/1	54/4	101
21	2	Armenia	2010		17/1		19/1	23/1		22/1	81/4	100
21	2	Armenia	2011		10/1			/1		9/2	19/4	100
22		Mexico	2010	18/1		15/1			10/1	/1	43/4	95
22		Mexico	2011			12/1	17/1	10/1		13/1	52/4	95
23		Spain	2010	14/1			15/1	9/1	/1		38/4	91
23		Spain	2011	16/1			7/1	9/1	21/1		53/4	91
24		Hungary	2010				18/1	26/2		12/1	56/4	90
24		Hungary	2011				14/1	12/1	8/1	/1	34/4	90
25		Indonesia	2010	/1	23/1			21/1			44/3	89
25		Indonesia	2011	14/1	15/2			16/1			45/4	89
26		India	2010	3/1	12/1	8/1			8/1		31/4	86
26		India	2011	35/2	12/1			8/1			55/4	86
27		Italy	2010	26/2		10/1				10/1	46/4	74
27		Italy	2011	9/2		9/1				10/1	28/4	74
28		Albania	2010	17/1	14/1	11/2					42/4	69
28		Albania	2011	/1		19/2	8/1				27/4	69
29		Azerbaijan	2010	7/1							7/1	68
29		Azerbaijan	2011	19/1	20/1					22/1	61/3	68
30		France	2010	8/1			16/2				24/3	67
30		France	2011	25/2	18/2						43/4	67
31		Brazil	2010					14/1	14/1		28/2	61
31		Brazil	2011	7/1	8/1			5/1	13/1		33/4	61
32		Nigeria	2010									55
32		Nigeria	2011		16/1		16/1		/1	23/1	55/4	55
33		Romania	2010	5/1	11/1		14/2				30/4	53
33		Romania	2011				23/1				23/1	53
34		Sweden	2010		10/1		11/1		9/1		30/3	34
34		Sweden	2011		/1			4/1			4/2	34
35		Greece	2010	4/1	8/1		12/1				24/3	34
35		Greece	2011		5/1		5/1				10/2	34
36		Vietnam	2010					18/1			18/1	29
36		Vietnam	2011				11/1				11/1	29
37		Czech Republic	2010				17/1	8/1			25/2	25
37		Czech Republic	2011									25
38		Finland	2010			9/1					9/1	24
38		Finland	2011		/1		15/2				15/3	24
39		Uzbekistan	2010	8/2		7/1				9/1	24/4	24
39		Uzbekistan	2011									24
40		Australia	2010									22
40		Australia	2011	6/1		6/1			10/1		22/3	22
41		Philippines	2010									20
41		Philippines	2011			20/1					20/1	20
42		Hong Kong	2010		/1						0/1	19
42		Hong Kong	2011		19/1						19/1	19
43		United Arab Emirates	2010		7/1	11/2					18/3	18
43		United Arab Emirates	2011									18
44		Puerto Rico	2010		/1		/1	/1	/1		0/4	17
44		Puerto Rico	2011	17/1							17/1	17
45		Samoa	2010									17
45		Samoa	2011						17/1	/1	17/2	17
46		Norway	2010				/1				0/1	15
46		Norway	2011				15/1				15/1	15
47		Serbia	2010				13/1				13/1	13
47		Serbia	2011				/1				0/1	13
48		South Africa	2010	13/1							13/1	13
48		South Africa	2011									13
49		New Zealand	2010									12
49		New Zealand	2011							12/1	12/1	12
50		Denmark	2010		9/1						9/1	12
50		Denmark	2011		3/1						3/1	12
51		Solomon Islands	2010									10
51		Solomon Islands	2011			7/1		3/1			10/2	10
52		Nauru	2010									9
52		Nauru	2011						9/1		9/1	9
53		Fiji	2010									8
53		Fiji	2011			8/1					8/1	8
54		El Salvador	2010									8
54		El Salvador	2011	8/1							8/1	8
55		Bosnia and Herzegovina	2010						7/1		7/1	7
55		Bosnia and Herzegovina	2011							/1	0/1	7
56		Seychelles	2010									6
56		Seychelles	2011					6/1			6/1	6
57		Pakistan	2010									5
57		Pakistan	2011	5/1							5/1	5
58		Slovakia	2010									4
58		Slovakia	2011		4/1						4/1	4
—		Cameroon	2010									0
—		Cameroon	2011					/1			0/1	0
—		Malaysia	2010									0
—		Malaysia	2011		/1						0/1	0
—		Moldova	2010									0
—		Moldova	2011	/1							0/1	0
—		Mongolia	2010			/1	/2		/1		0/4	0
—		Mongolia	2011			/1	/1				0/2	0
—		Peru	2010									0
—		Peru	2011	/1							0/1	0

=== African Championships ===
- Teams 1st–4th: 1 athlete

Rank	Quota	NOC	Category							Total
Rank	Quota	NOC	48	53	58	63	69	75	+75	Total
1	1	Nigeria	28/1	28/1		28/1			28/1	112
2	1	Tunisia			28/1	23/1	25/1		25/1	101
3	1	Cameroon			25/1	47/2		28/1		100
4	1	Madagascar	25/1		21/1		22/1	20/1		88
5		Ghana		23/1	19/1		23/1	23/1		88
6		South Africa		25/1	40/2	21/1				86
7		Kenya	23/1	22/1		20/1	20/1			85
8		Morocco			20/1	19/1		25/1		64
9		Seychelles			23/1		28/1			51
10		Mauritius						21/1	23/1	44
11		Sudan					21/1	22/1		43
12		Uganda							22/1	22

=== European Championships ===
- Teams 1st–6th: 1 athlete

Rank	Quota	NOC	Category							Total
Rank	Quota	NOC	48	53	58	63	69	75	+75	Total
1	1	Azerbaijan	28/1		28/1		22/1		28/1	106
2	1	Romania	25/1	22/1		23/1	28/1			98
3	1	Spain	23/1	21/1			23/1	28/1		95
4	1	Bulgaria		23/1	23/1			25/1	23/1	94
5	1	Albania		25/1	25/1	21/1	20/1			91
6	1	France	43/2	19/1		20/1				82
7		Slovakia			18/1			41/2	21/1	80
8		Greece			19/1	18/1	21/1		22/1	80
9		Sweden		17/1	20/1	22/1		20/1		79
10		Czech Republic	19/1			15/1		22/1	20/1	76
11		Hungary				42/2	/1		25/1	67
12		Finland				41/2		19/2		60
13		Italy	/1	20/1	21/1	19/1				60
14		Moldova		28/1				21/1		49
15		Norway					25/1			25
16		Israel			22/1					22
17		Lithuania	20/1							20
18		Denmark		18/1						18
19		Latvia				17/1				17
—		Bosnia and Herzegovina						/1		0

=== Asian Championships ===
- Teams 1st–6th: 1 athlete

Rank	Quota	NOC	Category							Total
Rank	Quota	NOC	48	53	58	63	69	75	+75	Total
1	1	Uzbekistan	53/2			25/1	23/1			101
2	1	Syria			20/1		21/1	28/1	25/1	94
3	1	Vietnam	43/2	23/1		28/1				94
4	1	Indonesia	19/1	25/1	25/1		25/1			94
5	1	India	43/2	22/1			28/1			93
6	1	United Arab Emirates						47/2	45/2	92
7		Malaysia		41/2	22/1				28/1	91
8		Turkmenistan		18/1	44/2			23/1		85
9		Mongolia		19/1	/1	/1	22/1			41
10		Hong Kong		28/1						28
11		Philippines			28/1					28
12		Kyrgyzstan	18/1							18
13		Pakistan		17/1						17

=== Pan-American Championships ===
- Teams 1st–4th: 1 athlete

Rank	Quota	NOC	Category							Total
Rank	Quota	NOC	48	53	58	63	69	75	+75	Total
1	1	Mexico	28/1		28/1	28/1	28/1			112
2	1	Brazil		28/1	23/1		25/1	28/1		104
3	1	Chile			25/1		23/1	25/1	28/1	101
4	1	Guatemala		23/1	20/1	25/1			25/1	93
5		El Salvador	45/2	25/1		22/1				92
6		Puerto Rico	25/1		19/1			22/1	23/1	89
7		Peru	21/1	22/1	43/2					86
8		Nicaragua	19/1	21/1		21/1				61
9		Argentina	20/1		/1	23/1				43
10		Costa Rica						23/1		23
11		Panama					22/1			22

=== Oceania Championships ===
- Teams 1st–4th: 1 athlete

Rank	Quota	NOC	Category							Total
Rank	Quota	NOC	48	53	58	63	69	75	+75	Total
1	1	Samoa					28/1	28/1	50/2	106
2	1	Papua New Guinea	28/1	28/1	22/1		25/1			103
3	1	Fiji	25/1		28/1	22/1		23/1		98
4	1	Australia		25/1		25/1		25/1	23/1	98
5		New Zealand	23/1	23/1	23/1				25/1	94
6		Solomon Islands			25/1	28/1				53
7		Marshall Islands		22/1	21/1					43
8		Nauru					23/1			23
9		Tonga				23/1				23
10		Cook Islands							21/1	21

== Individual qualification ==
Eight places for men and seven places for women are allocated based on the Olympic Qualification Ranking Lists. Individual quota places are allocated to the athletes, ranked in the top 15 places for men and the top 10 places for women in each bodyweight category, from NOCs which have not gained any quota place(s) through the Main or Continental Qualification Events.

=== Men ===
No.	Weight	Name	Record	Meet	Rank
1	105	Ahed Joughili (SYR)	399	Russia Grand Prix	8
2	62	Julio Salamanca (ESA)	282	2012 Pan-American	12
3	105	Martin Tešovič (SVK)	387	2010 World	13
4	105	Artūrs Plēsnieks (LAT)	383	2011 World Junior	14
5	62	Manuel Minginfel (FSM)	280	2012 Oceania	15
6	+105	Itte Detenamo (NRU)	408	2011 World	15
7	Did not allocate				
8	Did not allocate				

=== Women ===
No.	Weight	Name	Record	Meet	Rank
1	53	Cristina Iovu (MDA)	207	2012 European	5
2	58	Hidilyn Diaz (PHI)	212	2012 Asian	9
3	53	Yu Weili (HKG)	201	2012 Asian	10
4	Did not allocate				
5	Did not allocate				
6	Did not allocate				
7	Did not allocate				

== Tripartite commission invitations ==
=== Men ===
No.	Weight	Name
1	+105	Carl Henriquez (ARU)
2	94	Christopher Pavón (HON)
3	62	Stevick Patris (PLW)
4	77	Toafitu Perive (SAM)
5	62	Tuau Lapua Lapua (TUV)
6	Did not allocate	

=== Women ===
No.	Weight	Name
1	+75	Luisa Peters (COK)
2	63	Lucía Castañeda (NCA)
3	Did not allocate	
4	Did not allocate	

== Reallocation of unused quota places ==
=== Men ===
No.	NOC
1	Belgium
2	Finland
3	Uganda

=== Women ===
No.	NOC
1	Ghana
2	Kenya
3	Peru
4	Puerto Rico
5	Singapore
6	Solomon Islands
