= Yuderqui Contreras =

Dominican Republic weightlifter

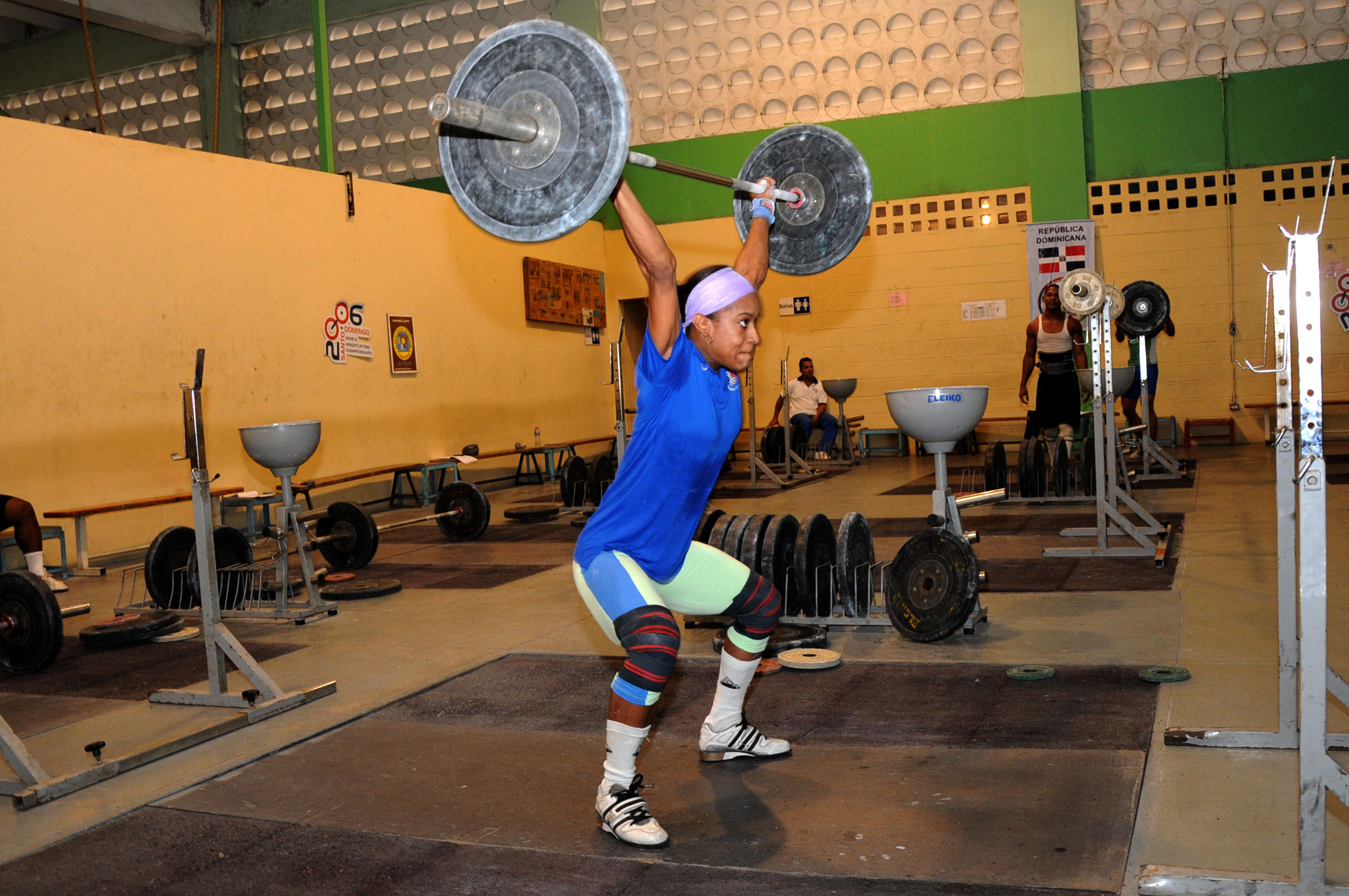

Personal information
- Full name: Yuderqui Maridalia Contreras
- Nationality: Dominican
- Born: March 27, 1986 (age 40) San Pedro de Macorís, Dominican Republic
- Height: 1.55 m (5.1 ft)
- Weight: 53 kg (117 lb)

Sport
- Country: Dominican Republic
- Sport: Weightlifting
- Events: –53 kg and –58 kg
- Coached by: Félix Ogando, Héctor Domínguez
Medal record
Representing the Dominican Republic
Women's weightlifting
World Championships
| Bronze medal – third place | 2005 Doha | – 53 kg |
| Bronze medal – third place | 2010 Antalya | – 53 kg |
Pan American Games
| Gold medal – first place | 2007 Rio de Janeiro | – 53 kg |
| Gold medal – first place | 2011 Guadalajara | – 53 kg |
| Silver medal – second place | 2003 Santo Domingo | – 53 kg |
Pan American Championships
| Gold medal – first place | 2008 Callao | – 53 kg |
| Gold medal – first place | 2013 Isla Margarita | – 53 kg |
| Gold medal – first place | 2014 Santo Domingo | – 53 kg |
| Bronze medal – third place | 2016 Cartagena | – 58 kg Snatch |
| Silver medal – second place | 2010 Guatemala City | – 58 kg |
| Bronze medal – third place | 2004 Cali | – 58 kg |
| Bronze medal – third place | 2012 Antigua Guatemala | – 58 kg |
Pan American Sports Festival
| Gold medal – first place | 2014 Mexico City | – 58 kg Clean & Jerk |
| Silver medal – second place | 2014 Mexico City | – 58 kg Snatch |
Central American and Caribbean Games
| Gold medal – first place | 2006 Cartagena | – 58 kg |
| Gold medal – first place | 2010 Mayagüez | – 53 kg |
| Silver medal – second place | 2014 Veracruz | – 53 kg Snatch |

Yuderqui Maridalia Contreras (born March 27, 1986), also known as Yudelkis Contreras, is a Dominican Republican weightlifter. She went to the 2008 Summer Olympics where she was 5th. After the Games, she was accused of failing a doping control, but the case ended with her name cleared. She was one of the two athletes that represented her home country in weightlifting at the 2012 Summer Olympics. She failed her three attempts in the snatch stage ending with no mark.

Contreras is a two-time bronze medal winner at the World Weightlifting Championships: 2005 and 2010. She was awarded Dominican Republic Athlete of the year in 2005, and as of 2012, she have been awarded Female Weightlifting Athlete of the Year six times. She is two-time gold medal winner in Pan American Games, in 2007 and 2011, and silver medalist in 2003. She is the record holder of these games, which she set in the 2007 edition and improved in the snatch in 2011. She is also a Central American and Caribbean Games two-time gold medal winner, in 2006 and 2010 and record holder, set in 2010.

== Personal life ==
Contreras is 155 cm (5 ft 1 in) tall 53 kilograms (117 lb), born on March 27, 1986, in San Pedro de Macorís. She is the fourth of five siblings, her parents are Arístides Sánchez Reyna and Eridania Contreras, who raised her. She went to Ana Josefa Puello elementary school and Gastón Fernández Deligne and CENAPEC High school. She is married to José Ariel Peña, and is the cousin of Wanda Rijo, two-time Pan American Games gold medalist in the –75 kg weightlifting category.

When Contreras was a teenager she started training in athletics in San Pedro de Macorís, where she grew up, but had to quit because her father could not take her to practice every day, and she was not allowed to go by herself. Coach Fausto Gómez convince her to join weightlifting, but as an under-age she struggled with her training. She stayed in weightlifting because she liked the way her body was changing, mainly her legs. She is a member of the Dominican Republic Army, and in February 2011 she was promoted from sergeant major to second lieutenant. As of 2011, she is studying accounting at Universidad Nacional Pedro Henríquez Ureña. She is known for being quiet, shy and humble.

In November 2011, the ex-rector of the Universidad Autónoma de Santo Domingo Franklin García Fermín used posters of Yuderqui and Gabriel Mercedes, without permission, to promote the presidential candidate of the Dominican Revolutionary Party Hipólito Mejía. Contreras clarified she is not involved in politics.

== Career ==
=== Early career – 2008 ===
Contreras started in weightlifting at the age of 14. As a 17-year-old she won the silver medal at the 53 kg category at the 2003 Pan American Games, held in Santo Domingo, Dominican Republic. As a 17 years old, she won the bronze medal at the 2004 Pan American Championships, held in May in Cali, Colombia, lifting 82.5 kg in snatch, 105 kg in clean & jerk and 187 kg in total in the 58 kg category. The Ecuadorian Alexandra Escobar won the gold and Canadian Maryse Turcotte the bronze medal. In the same year, during the National championship, she set a new record lifting 185 in total, 80 in snatch and 104 in clean & jerk. For all those achievements, she was chosen in her country "Weightlifting athlete of the Year". She participated in the 2005 World Weightlifting Championships, winning the bronze medal in the 53 kg category, lifting 95 kg in snatch and 116 kg in clean and jerk: 211 kg in total. This made her the second weightlifter from Dominican Republic to win a medal at the World Weightlifting Championships—the first was Eridania Segura in the 1992 edition.

In 2006, Contreras was selected by the local Olympic Committee and Cervecería Nacional Dominicana as Athlete of the Year for 2005 and received an award of RD$100,000 (approximately US$3,125 in May 2006). She dedicated the award to her mother and her coaches. Later that year, she won the silver medal at the 2006 Junior World Weightlifting Championship in snatch with 89 kg and bronze in total with 200 kg. In the 2006 Dominican Republic National Games, she represented the "East" region and won three medals in the 58 kg category, setting new records in all lifting styles with 90 kg in snatch, 110 kg in clean and jerk; 200 kg in total. With this she imitated her Cousin Wanda Rijo, who won three gold medals in the 1997 National Games. The 2006 Central American and Caribbean Games held at the Colombian city of Cartagena saw Contreras win the gold medal in snatch with 95 kg, the silver in clean and jerk with a 111 kg, and the gold medal in total with 206 kg in the Lightweight (– 58 kg) division. Following her success in 2006, she was listed among the Dominican Republic newspaper Diario Libre's "Men and Women of the Year".

In recognition of her athletic success representing her country, the Dominican Republic Sports Ministry rebuilt Contreras' house, being re-inaugurated in February 2007 by the Minister Felipe Payano. She traveled to Matanzas, Cuba, to take part at XXVI Manuel Suárez International Weightlifting Tournament winning the gold medal in the 58 kg division with a 92 kg mark in snatch, 117 kg in clean & jerk and 209 kg in total, all of them new records for the competition. Later that year, she was selected by the Dominican Republic Olympic Committee as the flag bearer at the 2007 Pan American Games. In these games, she won the gold medal in the under 53 kg category, setting three new records with 95 kg in snatch, 112 kg in clean and jerk, and 207 kg in total. After that winning she was promoted from sergeant to sergeant major. At the 2007 World Championships held in Chiang Mai, Thailand, she failed her three attempts in snatch, two with 92 kg and the last with 93 kg. She marked 107 kg in clean & jerk ranking 12th and ended with no mark in total in the under 53 kg category because of her snatch failure.

In 2008, the Dominican Republic Youth Ministry awarded Contreras for her success in the sports field as a youth, and she was recognized once again in Dario Libre's "Men and Women of the Year", receiving a Silver Tray as one of the 10 finalist for the main award. The 2008 Dominican Republic Military Games saw Contreras win the 58 kg for the later crowned event champion, the National Army. In early March, she won three gold medals at the 2008 Pan American Championships, qualifying her for the next Olympic Games. For her 2007 year-round performance, the San Pedro de Macorís Guild of Sport Writers awarded Contreras in May, as her province "Athlete of the Year". Before the Olympics, she had a two-month training in Bulgaria, trying to recover her legs strength. At the 2008 Summer Olympics, she ranked 5th with a total of 204 kg in the 53 kg category, after being trained by the Bulgarian coach Konstantin Darov.

=== 2009 controversy – 2011 ===
After competing at the Olympics, Contreras tested positive for a CERA enhancer drug, and faced a two-year suspension, but the backup B sample was negative. At the end of the case, five athletes were sanctioned by the International Olympic Committee, but Contreras's case was dismissed concluding that she did not violated any doping rule. She celebrated her 23rd birthday winning the 58 kg at the Military Games, helping the Dominican Army to win the weightlifting competition. For all her honors since 2003 until 2009, the Dominican Republic newspaper Hoy awarded her "Athlete of the Decade" in weightlifting.

In April 2010, Contreras set a new national record in snatch with 98 kg, winning three gold medals during the 58 kg division at the weightlifting tournament of the Dominican Republic Military Games. One month later, she won the silver medal at the 2010 Pan American Weightlifting Championships, after losing the gold medal to the Ecuadorian Alexandra Escobar in the under 58 kg category.

Due to stress-related weight loss, Contreras began competing in the 53 kg category later in 2010, and she won three gold medals at the 2010 Central American and Caribbean Games held in Mayagüez, Puerto Rico, setting new records in snatch with 96 kg, 117 kg in clean and jerk, and 213 kg total weight. She received the support from the telephone company Tricom to train in Bulgaria as part of the company's "Tricom Sport Project", and she and national athletes Gabriel Mercedes and Víctor Estrella later received incentives for RD$100,000 after winning. That September, Contreras won the silver medal in snatch and bronze in total at the 53 kg category from the 2010 World Weightlifting Championships in Antalya, Turkey.

In February 2011, she was promoted by the Dominican Republic Army from sergeant major to second lieutenant, and later that year she won the gold medal in the 53 kg category at the 2011 Pan American Games, setting a new record in snatch for the regional games with 96 kg. Competing at the 2011 World Weightlifting Championships in Paris, France, she won the silver medal with a 95 kg snatch lift in the – 53 kg, after winning she gave the credit to her coaches Héctor Domínguez, Félix Ogando and Belarusian Liavontsi Hancharenka. Among many other military athletes, she was awarded for their performance during all 2011 by the Dominican Army Commander, Major General Pedro Antonio Cáceres Chestaro, during the year-end army Christmas celebration.

=== 2012 ===
In May, Contreras raised her body weight to 55.7 kg and competed in the under 58 kg category at the Pan-American Championship held in Antigua Guatemala, Guatemala winning the bronze medal with a total lifted of 206 kg.

The Dominican Republic Weightlifting Federation awarded Contreras with her 6th "Female Weightlifting athlete of the Year", and also being considered by the national Olympic Committee for the National Athlete of the Year Award. She finished in 4th place after the winner, taekwondo practitioner Gabriel Mercedes, table tennis player Wu Xue and volleyball player Bethania de la Cruz.

After the National Federation gave her one of the two entries given to the National Olympic Committee by the International Weightlifting Federation to participate in the Olympic Games, Contreras was set to practice under the guidance of Belarusian Leonte Goncharenko. Even though she was lifting 100 kg in snatch and 120 kg in clean and jerk and one of her country's biggest hope for an Olympic medal, she failed her three attempts for 94 kg in snatch falling out of the competition.

=== 2013 ===
She participated in the Women's Sports Festival held in Santo Domingo taking the competitors sports oath, her first competition after the London Olympics and she confessed that she felt that she could overcame what happened there. Contreras, that was awarded weightlifting Most Valuable Athlete, lifted 96 kg in the 53 kg snatch competition to win the gold medal.

After helping the Dominican Army to win the weightlifting competition from the National Military Games with gold in the 53 kg, she took part in June in the Panamerican Championships same division, winning the snatch gold medal with 92 kg but she tried to set a new Pan American record with 97 kg and failed. She earned the silver medal with 110 kg in clean and jerk after the 111 from Colombian Rusmery Villar and the gold in total with 202 kg.

=== 2014 ===
Contreras was awarded 2013 athlete of the year in weightlifting by the National Olympic Committee and along with Brayelin Martínez and Yenebier Guillén as the only females awarded by the Guild of Sport Writers for their success in the previous year. She said that every award she received she take it as the first one and that she hope to continue being the queen of weightlifting.

Competing at home in the Pan American Weightlifting Championships and after spending 24 hours without food to reach her category weight limit, 58 kg, she won the gold medal in snatch setting a new Pan American record with 97 kg and gold in total with 207 kg. She won the clean and jerk silver with 110 kg after losing by bodyweight to the Colombian Rusmeris Villar with the same lift. Her coach confessed that she made the same mistake with her arms in her two fails with 113 trying to set a new record. Contreras felt disappointed with herself because she was in great form for the competition, but she said that always prepares herself physically and under God's willing.

She traveled then traveled to Mexico to compete in the 58 kg division of the first Pan American Sports Festival, winning the gold medal in clean and jerk with 107 kg and silver in snatch with 90 kg.

She participated in the 2014 World Weightlifting Championships in Almaty, Kazakhstan, finishing in the eleventh position with 87 kg in snatch, 105 kg in clean and jerk and 192 kg in total. Even though she could lift more weight, her main goal was to prepare for the upcoming Central American and Caribbean Games and cumulate points for the 2016 Summer Olympics qualification.

Contreras went to the 2014 Central American and Caribbean Games as one of the main medal hope, she was trying to win the gold and set new records working with her coaches Héctor Domínguez and Félix Ogando. She was dealing with a hip injury, lifting 90 kg but miss her only try in clean and jerk with 106 and retired in the second try with a worse injury.

=== 2015 ===
During the 2015 Pan American Games in Toronto, she was training without pain from her previous injury after having surgery to correct a lumbar hernia in January but could not reach the level of her two previous Pan American Games golds in 2007 and 2011, failing three times to lift 88 kg in the 53 kg snatch. She also saw her clean and jerk record fell in the competition to the later gold medalist, the Colombian Rusmery Villar, improving the mark from 112 to 115 kg. Team partner and bronze medalist Yafreisy Silvestre later revealed that Contreras was suffering from an injured leg before the competition.

Contreras was set to compete in the 58 kg division from the World Weightlifting Championships, and that division would be her new one onwards. She ranked ninth with 95 kg in snatch, 116 kg in clean and jerk and 211 kg in total.

== Major results ==
| Year | Venue | Weight | Record (kg) / Rank | | |
| Year | Venue | Weight | Snatch | Cl&Jerk | Total |
Olympic Games
| 2008 | Beijing, China | 53 kg | 93 / 4 | 111 / 5 | 204 / 5 |
| 2012 | London, United Kingdom | 53 kg | No mark | No mark | DNF |
World Championships
| 2003 | Vancouver, Canada | 53 kg | 77.5 / 15 | 102.5 / 14 | 180.0 / 13 |
| 2005 | Doha, Qatar | 53 kg | 95 / (bronze) | 116 / 4 | 211 / (bronze) |
| 2006 | Santo Domingo, Dominican Republic | 53 kg | 92 / 4 | 113 / 5 | 205 / 4 |
| 2007 | Chiang Mai, Thailand | 53 kg | No mark | 107 / 12 | No mark |
| 2009 | Goyang, South Korea | 53 kg | 91 / 4 | 111 / 6 | 202 / 4 |
| 2010 | Antalya, Turkey | 53 kg | 93 / (silver) | 113 / 6 | 206 / (bronze) |
| 2011 | Paris, France | 53 kg | 95 / (silver) | 111 / 9 | 206 / 5 |
| 2014 | Almaty, Kazakhstan | 53 kg | 87 / 9 | 105 / 14 | 194 / 11 |
| 2015 | Houston, United States | 58 kg | 95 / 8 | 116 / 13 | 211 / 9 |
