= Mateo Aquino Febrillet =

Dominican politician

Mateo Aquino Febrillet Rector Magnificent
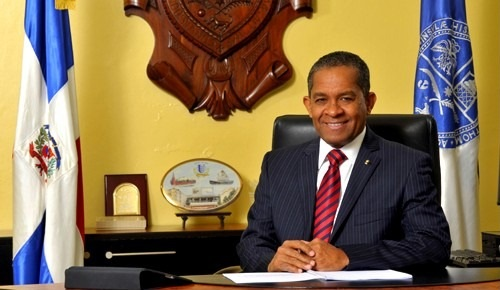

Rector Autonomous University of Santo Domingo
- In office February 28, 2011 – February 28, 2014
- Preceded by: Franklin García Fermín
- Succeeded by: Iván Grullón Fernández

Personal details
- Born: September 21, 1955 San Cristóbal, Dominican Republic
- Died: March 11, 2016 (aged 60) Santo Domingo
- Cause of death: Gunshot wound
- Party: Modern Revolutionary Party
- Spouse(s): Dilcia Lapaix (1978-1988); Rita Solís
- Children: 3
- Parent: Inocencia Febrillet Pozo Federico Aquino Minier
- Education: Autonomous University of Santo Domingo
- Occupation: Educator, administrator, writer, politician

Mateo Aquino Febrillet (September 21, 1955 – March 11, 2016) was a Dominican Republic educator, administrator, writer and politician. He was elected Dean of the Autonomous University of Santo Domingo in 2011 and candidate for Senator of the Modern Revolutionary Party in the province of San Cristóbal, Dominican Republic in the last elections of 2016.

Appointed Doctor Honoris Causa, by Andrés Bello National University of El Salvador and Honorary Professor of the National Autonomous University of Nicaragua.

He was declared a meritorious son of San Cristóbal, Dominican Republic, his native city, by the municipality of that municipality; meritorious of Yaguate, by the municipal council of Yaguate; Visitor and Distinguished Host with delivery of the keys of the city of several municipalities in the Dominican Republic among which stand out: Cotui, Bonao, Barahona, La Vega, as well as in San Salvador, Republic of El Salvador.

== Origins ==
Mateo Aquino Febrillet was born on September 21, 1955, in the Juan Pablo Pina Hospital of San Cristóbal, Dominican Republic, he was the son of Federico Aquino Minier and Inocencia Febrillet Pozo, both deceased.

His first wife was Dilcia Lapaix with whom he had his first and only daughter Jessica Aquino Lapaix, who gave him two grandchildren, Enrique Pena Aquino and Nicole Pena Aquino. Mateo Aquino Febrillet and Dilcia Lapaix got divorced in 1988.

He was then married to the Licentiate Rita Solís, with whom he had two children (Jonathan and David).

== Education ==
The first three levels of elementary school took them in the School La Manigua, the 4th, 5th, and 6th he studied in the Basic School of Doña Ana. The intermediate level realized it in San Cristóbal (Yaguate), in the public school Fray Bartolomé of the Houses.

He completed his baccalauréat in Physics and Mathematics in three years, at the La Trinitaria Academy, attached to the Liceo Fidel Ferrer.

He graduated from the Autonomous University of Santo Domingo, where he obtained a bachelor's degree in Chemistry and Business Administration.

At the postgraduate level, he earned a specialization in Financial Management and a Masters in Management and Productivity from the APEC University, as well as a Diploma in University Management at the Santo Domingo Institute of Technology in the Dominican Republic.

He completed a PhD in the PhD program in Business Sciences at the University of Alcalá, Spain.

== Academic career ==
Professor Febrillet began his academic career at the Autonomous University of Santo Domingo, through an opposition competition from Monitor until he reached the highest level of professor. He also served as a teacher in the Master's programs.

He entered the administrative career also by competition of opposition in which progressively ascended until occupying the maximum managerial positions, including the General Secretariat of the Institution.

By election, he was chosen as administrative vice-rector, a position that exerted with success in the period 1999–2002.

In the elections held in February 2011, he was elected to the position of the Rector Magnificent of the Autonomous University of Santo Domingo, which he occupied until February 28, 2014.

He was a columnist for newspapers, where he eventually published articles primarily of academic interest.

His articles and lectures have been collected and published in the book " Academic Reflections ".

He also published the books "Reflections from the Academy", which includes his speeches and lectures, and the booklet "Reflections from the Academy: an appropriate defense of the UASD."

In addition to the activities mentioned above, he was the president of the Academic World Foundation and producer of the television program that carried the same name, which was edited before he became Rector of the UASD, and was relaunched when he left office In 2014, he was also the producer and driver along with a team of young San Cristobalenses, from the program "La Voz de San Cristobal", which was broadcast every Sunday from August 17, 2014.

== Political career ==
In the political sphere, he was recognized as a member of the Dominican Revolutionary Party from 1975 to 2015, holding various positions including those of Member of the National Executive Committee and of the Political Commission, as well as member of the Organization Departments, Education and Doctrine of said party.

Febrillet promoted of the agreement between the PRD and the PRM to join all the opposition political forces that ensured the victory in the 2016 elections, both at the level of the presidency and vice-presidency, and at the congressional and municipal level, of its country.

Despite this long militancy, he never held office in government; Had not previously aspired to any elective position at the municipal, congressional or presidential level.

In 2015 for the first time the proposal is presented so that the teacher Mateo Aquino Febrillet opts for an elective political position. It is the initiative of a group of citizens from different sectors and social strata, who, aware of the situation, decided to form the Support Movement to Senator Febrillet, (MASFE), to elect him as Senator of the Republic for the period 2016– 2020.

== Death ==
Mateo Aquino Febrillet, died as a result of gunshot wounds the afternoon of March 11, 2016, while mediated in an argument among the candidates for deputies by the Modern Revolutionary Party, Blas Peralta and Edward Montás.

Currently there is the judicial process to determine the criminals responsible for the event.

On April 22, 2016, family members, friends and colleagues of Mateo Aquino Febrillet, acknowledged his contribution to the academy and the Dominican society with a banner unveiled in his honor next to the Ceiba tree that the late academic had planted in April 2011.

During his tenure, Aquino Febrillet planted a tree of Ceiba pentandra in 2011 and at that time said: "When I die, I want my ashes to be scattered at the foot of this tree."
