= Franklin García Fermín =

Dominican jurist and academic

Dr. Franklin García Fermín

Minister of superior education, science and technology
- Incumbent
- Assumed office 16 August 2020
- Preceded by: Alejandrina Germán

Personal details
- Born: 17 January 1957 (age 69) Duarte Province, Dominican Republic
- Citizenship: Dominican
- Party: Modern Revolutionary Party (present)
- Education: Universidad Autónoma de Santo Domingo (1983), University of the Basque Country
- Profession: Lawyer

Franklin García Fermín (San Francisco de Macorís, 17 January 1957) is a Dominican jurist and professor from the Universidad Autónoma de Santo Domingo, and its Rector for 2008-2011 period.

== Biography ==
He was born in San Francisco de Macorís. His grandfather was General Santo García, well-known patriot and former Civil Governor of Santiago de los Caballeros. His father, Marco Tulio García, was a judge and public prosecutor for more than 35 years.

In 1976, entry to the UASD to the law school. He has graduate degrees in Civil Rights and Political Science as well a diploma in International Relations and Diplomacy.

He began his career as a teaching in 1984 as professor deputy and a year later became a professor of the law school. In 1987 he was elected president of the Juridical and Politics Sciences Faculty Assembly, and in 1992 president of the Colegio de Abogados de la República Dominicana.

In 2001 he received the title of Investigator of the Universidad del País Vasco, and in 2003 that of Doctor.

On 22 February 2008 he was elected Rector of UASD.

He currently serves as the Minister of Higher Education for the Dominican Republic.

== Honours and awards ==
- Amín Abel Hasbún Student Award (Student merit award from UASD) Dominican Republic
- Andrés Bello Order, first class (Venezuela)
- Fray Antón de Montesino Juridical Merit National Grand Prize
- Guest Professor of the Paris University. France.
- Teach of the Universidad Nacional San Antonio Abad del Cusco

== Author ==
García Fermín has written a number of books:

- Introducción al Estudio del Derecho (coauthor with Dr. Rosalía Sosa Pérez) (c1996)
- Evaluación del Poder Judicial y Propuesta para su Transformación
- Introducción al Derecho Privado
- Código del Menor y Recopilación de leyes que lo amplían y lo modifica
- Los Procesos Penales en Estados Unidos.

Preceded by —	Deputy Dean of Juridical and Politics Sciences Faculty; 1996–1999	Succeeded by —
Preceded by —	Dean of Juridical and Politics Sciences Faculty; 1999–2005	Succeeded by Santo Inocencio Mercedes Bastardo
Preceded by —	Deputy Rector of Extension of the University; 2005–2008	Succeeded by Nino Félix
Preceded by Roberto Reyna Tejada	Rector of the University; 2008–2011	Succeeded by Mateo Aquino Febrillet
