= Yoon Jin-hee =

South Korean weightlifter

Personal information
- Born: August 4, 1986 (age 40)
- Height: 1.58 m (5 ft 2 in)
- Weight: 53 kg (117 lb)
- Spouse: Won Jeong-sik

Sport
- Country: South Korea
- Sport: Weightlifting
- Event: Women's 53 kg
Medal record
Olympic Games
Silver medal – second place	2008 Beijing	-53 kg
Bronze medal – third place	2016 Rio de Janeiro	–53 kg
World Championships
Bronze medal – third place	2007 Chiang Mai	-53 kg
Bronze medal – third place	2009 Goyang	-53 kg

Yoon Jin-Hee (Korean: 윤진희; Hanja: 尹眞熙, Korean pronunciation: [jun.dʑin.ɦi]; born August 4, 1986, in Wonju, Gangwon-do) is a South Korean weightlifter.

== Career ==
Yoon ranked 3rd in the women's 58 kg at the 2005 Junior World Championships in Busan, South Korea, lifting 206 kg in total. She also competed in the women's 58 kg at the 2005 World Championships in Doha, Qatar and reached the 4th spot with 215 kg in total.

At the 2006 World Weightlifting Championships she ranked fourth in the 58 kg category, and in the 2007 World Weightlifting Championships she won the bronze medal in the 53 kg category with 211 kg in total.

At the 2008 Summer Olympics she won the silver medal in women's 53 kg, and at the 2016 Summer Olympics she finished third in the same category.

She decided to retire earlier, but in 2014 abandoned retirement to compete for South Korea in the national team.

== Major result ==
Year	Venue	Weight	Snatch (kg)				Clean & jerk (kg)				Total	Rank
Year	Venue	Weight	1	2	3	Rank	1	2	3	Rank	Total	Rank
Olympic Games
2008	Beijing, China	53 kg	94	~~97~~	~~97~~	2	116	118	119	2	213	2nd place, silver medalist(s)
2016	Rio de Janeiro, Brazil	53 kg	88	~~90~~	~~90~~	4	~~110~~	110	111	3	199	3rd place, bronze medalist(s)
World Championships
2005	Doha, Qatar	58 kg	89	95	~~97~~	5	113	117	120	4	215	4
2006	Santo Domingo, Dominican Republic	58 kg	90	94	~~97~~	4	113	118	~~123~~	4	212	4
2007	Chiang Mai, Thailand	53 kg	~~90~~	90	94	1st place, gold medalist(s)	110	115	117	3rd place, bronze medalist(s)	211	3rd place, bronze medalist(s)
2009	Goyang, South Korea	53 kg	93	~~95~~	~~96~~	2nd place, silver medalist(s)	113	116	~~119~~	3rd place, bronze medalist(s)	209	3rd place, bronze medalist(s)
2011	Paris, France	53 kg	87	~~90~~	~~90~~	10	105	110	~~112~~	11	197	11
2015	Houston, United States	53 kg	75	80	83	15	98	103	105	15	188	16
Asian Games
2006	Doha, Qatar	58 kg	90	93	~~95~~	5	110	~~115~~	115	4	208	4
