= Judith Chacón =

Venezuelan weightlifter (1986–2009)

Personal information
- Full name: Judith Andrea Chacón Ozuriaga
- Nationality: Venezuela
- Born: 29 January 1986 Caracas, Distrito Capital, Venezuela
- Died: 27 October 2009 (aged 23) Barquisimeto, Lara, Venezuela
- Height: 1.52 m (5 ft 0 in)
- Weight: 53 kg (117 lb)

Sport
- Sport: Weightlifting
- Event: 53 kg

Judith Andrea Chacón Ozuriaga (January 29, 1986 – October 27, 2009) was a Venezuelan weightlifter. Chacon represented Venezuela at the 2008 Summer Olympics in Beijing, where she competed for the women's featherweight category (53 kg). Chacon placed last out of nine weightlifters in this event, as she successfully lifted 80 kg in the single-motion snatch, and hoisted 101 kg in the two-part, shoulder-to-overhead clean and jerk, for a total of 181 kg. Her performance in weightlifting was also a top finish for Venezuela at these games. Shortly after the Olympics, she had briefly retired from weightlifting because of pregnancy. El nombre de su hija es Yolimar Alejandra Marchan Chacón.

On October 27, 2009, Chacon died from pregnancy-related complications, including the H1N1 flu virus in her birthplace Caracas. According to Eddy Suarez, president of Venezuelan Weightlifting Federation, he regretted the sudden demise of Chacon, who would have been admitted to the hospital immediately for further treatment and speedy recovery. Following her death, the doctors managed to save her daughter from infection, and placed her in a special care.
