= Elen Grigoryan =

Armenian weightlifter

Elen Grygorian (born 3 January 1988) is an Armenian female weightlifter. She won a silver medal at the 2011 European Weightlifting Championships. But she was disqualified afterwards.
