= Aylin Daşdelen =

Turkish weightlifter (born 1982)

Personal information
- Nationality: Turkish
- Born: 1 January 1982 (age 44) Yiğitler, Yenifakılı, Turkey
- Height: 1.60 m (5 ft 3 in)
- Weight: 53 kg (117 lb)

Sport
- Country: Turkey
- Sport: Weightlifting
- Event: 58 kg
- Club: Kocaeli Büyükşehir Belediyesi Kağıt Spor Kulübü
Medal record
World Championships
Silver medal – second place	2010 Antalya	– 53 kg
Silver medal – second place	2011 Paris	– 53 kg
Bronze medal – third place	2003 Vancouver	– 58 kg
European Championships
Gold medal – first place	2002 Antalya	– 53 kg
Gold medal – first place	2003 Loutraki	– 58 kg
Gold medal – first place	2010 Minsk	– 53 kg
Gold medal – first place	2011 Kazan	– 53 kg
Silver medal – second place	2004 Kyiv	– 58 kg
Silver medal – second place	2009 Bucharest	– 53 kg
Silver medal – second place	2012 Antalya	– 53 kg
Mediterranean Games
Gold medal – first place	2009 Pescara	– 58 kg Clean&Jerk
Gold medal – first place	2013 Mersin	– 58 kg Clean&Jerk
Gold medal – first place	2013 Mersin	– 58 kg Snatch
Bronze medal – third place	2009 Pescara	– 58 kg Snatch

Aylin Daşdelen (born 1 January 1982) is a Turkish female weightlifter competing in the Women's 53 kg and 58 kg divisions. At the championships held in 2003 in Loutraki, Greece, she broke three European records, in snatch, clean&jerk and in total weight lifted of the -58 kg division.

Aylin is a member of the Kocaeli Büyükşehir Belediyesi Kağıt Spor Kulübü in İzmit.

== Early life ==
She was born 1982 in Yiğitler village, Yenifakılı, Yozgat Province.

== Scandal ==
Aylin Daşdelen and her two teammates, Sibel Şimşek and Şule Şahbaz, filed in September 2004 complaints of sexual harassment against Mehmet Üstündağ, who was the coach of the Turkey national women's weightlifting team. He was accused of repeated physical sexual molestation going back several years. The court ordered the arrest of him despite his denial. Daşdelen told a television news program that Üstündağ also made it a habit of "beating" his charges. She blamed the trainer also for the 1999 suicide of teammate Esma Can.

The only support for Üstündağ came from Nurcan Taylan, who in turn accused her three teammates of being "lesbians". Üstündağ came under investigation on similar charges in the 2000s, but the evidence was inconclusive.

== Achievements ==
Olympics

Rank	Event	Year	Venue	Snatch	Clean & Jerk	Total
4	58 kg	2004	Athens, GRE	100.0	125.0	225.0

World Championships

Rank	Event	Year	Venue	Snatch	Clean & Jerk	Total
Silver	53 kg	2011	Paris, FRA		126.0	
Silver	53 kg	2011	Paris, FRA			219.0
Bronze	53 kg	2010	Antalya, TUR	90.0		
Silver	53 kg	2010	Antalya, TUR		121.0	
Silver	53 kg	2010	Antalya, TUR			211.0
Bronze	58 kg	2003	Vancouver, CAN	92.5	117.5	210.0
Silver	53 kg U-?	2002	Havířov, CZE	85.0		
Silver	53 kg U-?	2002	Havířov, CZE		105.0	
Silver	53 kg U-?	2002	Havířov, CZE			210.0
Silver	58 kg U-16	1997	Cape Town, RSA		105.0	
Silver	58 kg U-16	1997	Cape Town, RSA			182.5

European Championships

Rank	Event	Year	Venue	Snatch	Clean & Jerk	Total
Bronze	53 kg	2012	Antalya, TUR	88.0		
Silver	53 kg	2012	Antalya, TUR		113.0	
Silver	53 kg	2012	Antalya, TUR			201.0
Gold	53 kg	2011	Kazan, RUS	90.0		
Gold	53 kg	2011	Kazan, RUS		112.0	
Gold	53 kg	2011	Kazan, RUS			202.0
Gold	53 kg	2010	Minsk, BLR	88.0		
Gold	53 kg	2010	Minsk, BLR		120.0 ER	
Gold	53 kg	2010	Minsk, BLR			208.0
Bronze	53 kg	2009	Bucharest, ROM	82.0		
Silver	53 kg	2009	Bucharest, ROM		105.0	
Silver	53 kg	2009	Bucharest, ROM			187.0
Gold	58 kg	2004	Kyiv, UKR	98.5		
Silver	58 kg	2004	Kyiv, UKR		122.5	
Silver	58 kg	2004	Kyiv, UKR			220.0
Silver	58 kg	2003	Loutraki, GRE	98 ER		
Gold	58 kg	2003	Loutraki, GRE		123.0 ER	
Gold	58 kg	2003	Loutraki, GRE			220.0 ER
Gold	53 kg	2002	Antalya, TUR	92.5		
Gold	53 kg	2002	Antalya, TUR		112.5	
Gold	53 kg	2002	Antalya, TUR			205.0
Gold	58 kg U-16	1997	Sevilla, ESP	80.0		
Gold	53 kg U-16	1996	Burgas, BUL	65.0		
Gold	53 kg U-16	1996	Burgas, BUL		80.0	
Gold	53 kg U-16	1996	Burgas, BUL			145.0

Mediterranean Games

Rank	Event	Year	Venue	Snatch	Clean & Jerk
Bronze	58 kg	2009	Pescara, ITA	87.0	
Gold	58 kg	2009	Pescara, ITA		110.0
Gold	58 kg	2013	Mersin, TUR	87.0	
Gold	58 kg	2013	Mersin, TUR		113.0

Legend:

- ER European record
