= Ji Jing (weightlifter) =

Chinese weightlifter (born 1987)

Medal record

Women's Weightlifting

Representing China

World Weightlifting Championships
Bronze medal – third place	2011 Paris	– 53 kg

Ji Jing (born October 4, 1987) is a Chinese weightlifter. She competed in the 2011 World Weightlifting Championships and won a bronze medal.
