= Julia Schwarzbach =

German weightlifter

Julia Schwarzbach (née Rohde) (born 13 May 1989, Görlitz) is a German weightlifter. She competed at the 2008 Summer Olympics in the women's 53 kg, finishing 7th with a total of 185 kg (snatch = 82 kg, clean and jerk = 103 kg). In the same event at the 2012 Summer Olympics, she finished 11th, with a total of 193 kg (snatch = 85 kg, clean and jerk = 108 kg).
