= Lena Berntsson =

Swedish athlete

Lena Berntsson (born 4 November 1978, in Gothenburg) is a Swedish athlete who has competed internationally in both weightlifting and track and field. She lifts in the 53 kg weight category in weightlifting and on the track she specialises in short sprinting events, particularly the 60 metres.

She started her sporting career as a 60 metres specialist, recording a personal best of 7.44 seconds in 2000 and improving it to 7.42 seconds the following year. She suffered a knee injury in 2002 and during this time her sister, Annika Berntsson, introduced her to the sport of weightlifting. She underwent a significant operation in 2005, having tendon surgery in both knees, and she did not return to full fitness until 2007.

She was the 2007 Swedish champion in the 100 m, the 2008 national champion in the 100 metres hurdles, and she did a 100 and 200 metres double at the 2009 Swedish championships. She had similar success indoors, becoming the Swedish indoor champion over 60 m and the 60 metres hurdles in 2008, and retaining her 60 m title the following year. She also represented her country at the Finland-Sweden athletics international during this period, at which she won medals in the short sprints, the sprint hurdles, and the long jump.

She took part in the 2008 IAAF World Indoor Championships in Valencia, Spain. She reached the semi-finals of the women's 60 metres competition, running a personal best of 7.26 seconds to finish behind LaVerne Jones-Ferrette and outside of qualification. In March 2009 she was entered into the European Athletics Indoor Championships and she equalled her personal best to finish fifth in the 60 m final. The following month she competed at the 2009 European Weightlifting Championships in Bucharest and she finished twelfth in the women's 53 kg category, completing a snatch of 71 kg (a Swedish record) and a clean and jerk of 85 kg.

Later that year she took part in the 2009 European Team Championships and represented Sweden in the 100 and 200 m sprints. In November, she was selected to compete at the 2009 World Weightlifting Championships in the 53 kg category and finished in fifteenth place with a snatch of 70 kg and a clean and jerk of 90 kg. Her first major competition of 2010 was the 2010 IAAF World Indoor Championships at which she finished seventh in her 60 m semi-final race with a run of 7.41 seconds. Shortly afterwards she attended the 2010 European Weightlifting Championships in Minsk and finished with a total of 160 kg (72 kg in snatch, 88 kg in clean and jerk).

== Personal bests ==
Athletics
Event	Time (sec)	Venue	Date
60 metres	7.26	Valencia, Spain	7 March 2008
100 metres	11.50	Malmö, Sweden	1 August 2009
200 metres	23.66	Leiden, Netherlands	13 June 2009
60 metres hurdles	8.41	Malmö, Sweden	24 February 2008
100 metres hurdles	13.74	Helsinki, Finland	30 August 2008

- All information taken from IAAF profile.

Weightlifting
Event	Weight (kg)	Venue	Date
Snatch	72	Minsk, Belarus	April 2010
Clean and jerk	90	Goyang, South Korea	November 2009
Combined lift	160	Goyang, South Korea	November 2009
