= Li Ping (weightlifter) =

Chinese weightlifter (born 1988)

Personal information
- Born: 15 September 1988 (age 38)

Achievements and titles
- Personal bests: Snatch: 103 kg (2010, AGR, AR, WR); Clean and jerk: 127kg (2010); Total: 230 kg (2010)
Medal record
Women's weightlifting
Representing China
World Weightlifting Championships
Gold medal – first place	2005 Doha	53 kg
Gold medal – first place	2007 Chiang Mai	53 kg
Asian Games
Gold medal – first place	2006 Doha	53 kg
Gold medal – first place	2010 Guangzhou	53 kg
Asian Championships
Gold medal – first place	2007 Shandong	53 kg
Gold medal – first place	2011 Tongling	53 kg
Gold medal – first place	2015 Phuket	58 kg

Li Ping (李萍; born 15 September 1988) is a Chinese weightlifter.

== Major results ==
Year	Venue	Weight	Snatch (kg)				Clean & Jerk (kg)				Total	Rank
Year	Venue	Weight	1	2	3	Rank	1	2	3	Rank	Total	Rank
World Championships
2005	Doha, Qatar	53 kg	94	~~98~~	98	2nd place, silver medalist(s)	123	126	~~131~~	1st place, gold medalist(s)	224	1st place, gold medalist(s)
2007	Chiang Mai, Thailand	53 kg	93	~~96~~	~~96~~	3rd place, bronze medalist(s)	120	126	~~131~~	1st place, gold medalist(s)	219	1st place, gold medalist(s)
Asian Games
2006	Doha, Qatar	53kg	93	~~98~~	98	1	123	126	~~129~~	1	224	1st place, gold medalist(s)
2010	Guangzhou, China	53 kg	96	100	103	1	123	127	~~130~~	1	230	1st place, gold medalist(s)
Asian Championships
2007	Tai'an, China	53 kg	96			2nd place, silver medalist(s)	129			1st place, gold medalist(s)	225	1st place, gold medalist(s)
2011	Tongling, China	53 kg	90	~~95~~	~~95~~	1st place, gold medalist(s)	120	125	~~128~~	1st place, gold medalist(s)	215	1st place, gold medalist(s)
2015	Phuket, Thailand	58 kg	~~100~~	100	~~103~~	2nd place, silver medalist(s)	~~126~~	126	~~130~~	1st place, gold medalist(s)	226	1st place, gold medalist(s)
World Junior Championships
2005	Busan, South Korea	53 kg	85	90	~~93~~	1st place, gold medalist(s)	112	117	~~120~~	1st place, gold medalist(s)	207	1st place, gold medalist(s)
