= Yu Weili =

Hong Kong weightlifter

Personal information
- Born: June 24, 1983 (age 42)

Sport
- Country: Hong Kong
- Sport: Weightlifting
- Weight class: 53 kg

Yu Weili (born June 24, 1983) is a Chinese weightlifter who represents Hong Kong internationally. She competed at the 2012 Summer Olympics in the Women's 53 kg, finishing 9th.
