= Ri Song-hui =

North Korean weightlifter (born 1978)

Ri Song-Hui
Personal information
- Born: December 3, 1978 (age 47)
- Height: 152 cm (5 ft 0 in)
Medal record
Women's Weightlifting
Representing North Korea
Olympic Games
Silver medal – second place	2000 Sydney	– 58 kg
Silver medal – second place	2004 Athens	– 58 kg
World Championships
Gold medal – first place	2002 Warsaw	– 53 kg
Silver medal – second place	1997 Chiangmai	– 54 kg
Silver medal – second place	1999 Athens	– 58 kg
Silver medal – second place	2003 Vancouver	– 53 kg
Asian Games
Gold medal – first place	2002 Busan	– 53 kg
Silver medal – second place	1998 Bangkok	– 58 kg

- Korean name
- Hangul: 리성희
- RR: Ri Seonghui
- MR: Ri Sŏnghŭi

Ri Song-Hui (born December 3, 1978) is a North Korean weightlifter who competed in the women's 58 kg at the 2000 Summer Olympics and won the silver medal with 220.0 kg in total.

She repeated this in the 2004 Summer Olympics, this time lifting a total of 232.5 kg.

With 102 kg she broke the world record in snatch in the women's 53 kg class.
