= World and Olympic records set at the 2020 Summer Olympics =

Numerous world records and Olympic records were set in various events at the 2020 Summer Olympics in Tokyo. Some events occur under non-standard conditions, such as canoeing. In these cases, there are no official records, just "world best" and "Olympic best" results.

== Archery ==
Event	Round	Name	Nation	Score	Date	Record
Women's individual	Ranking round	An San	South Korea	680	23 July	OR
Women's team	Ranking round	An San; Jang Min-hee; Kang Chae-young	South Korea	2032	23 July	OR
Mixed team	Ranking round	Kim Je-deok; An San	South Korea	1368	23 July	OR

== Athletics ==
Event	Round	Name	Nation	Time (distance)	Date	Record
Mixed 4 × 400 metres relay	Round 1	Dariusz Kowaluk; Iga Baumgart-Witan; Małgorzata Hołub-Kowalik; Kajetan Duszyński	Poland	3:10.44	30 July	OR
Mixed 4 × 400 metres relay	Final	Karol Zalewski; Natalia Kaczmarek; Justyna Święty-Ersetic; Kajetan Duszyński	Poland	3:09.87	31 July	OR
Women's 100 metres	Final	Elaine Thompson Herah	Jamaica	10.61	31 July	OR
Women's 100 metres hurdles	Semifinal	Jasmine Camacho-Quinn	Puerto Rico	12.26	1 August	OR
Women's triple jump	Final	Yulimar Rojas	Venezuela	15.67 m	1 August	WR
Women's 200 metres	Round 1	Christine Mboma	Namibia	22.11	2 August	WU20R
Women's 200 metres	Semifinal	Christine Mboma	Namibia	21.97	2 August	WU20R
Men's 400 metres hurdles	Final	Karsten Warholm	Norway	45.94	3 August	WR
Women's 200 metres	Final	Christine Mboma	Namibia	21.81	3 August	WU20R
Men's decathlon	100 metres	Damian Warner	Canada	10.12	4 August	=WDB
Men's decathlon	Long jump	Damian Warner	Canada	8.24 m	4 August	ODB
Women's 400 metres hurdles	Final	Sydney McLaughlin	United States	51.46	4 August	WR
Men's decathlon	110 metres hurdles	Damian Warner	Canada	13.46	5 August	ODB
Men's shot put	Final	Ryan Crouser	United States	23.30 m	5 August	OR
Men's 1500 metres	Semifinal	Abel Kipsang	Kenya	3:31.65	5 August	OR
Women's 1500 metres	Final	Faith Kipyegon	Kenya	3:53.11	6 August	OR
Men's 1500 metres	Final	Jakob Ingebrigtsen	Norway	3:28.32	7 August	OR

== Canoe sprint ==
Event	Round	Name	Nation	Time	Date	Record
Women's K-1 200 metres	Semifinal	Lisa Carrington	New Zealand	38.127	3 August	OB
Men's C-2 1000 metres	Semifinal	Liu Hao; Zheng Pengfei	China	3:27.023	3 August	OB
Men's C-2 1000 metres	Semifinal	Sebastian Brendel; Tim Hecker	Germany	3:26.812	3 August	OB
Men's K-1 1000 metres	Semifinal	Bálint Kopasz	Hungary	3:24.558	3 August	OB
Men's K-1 1000 metres	Semifinal	Fernando Pimenta	Portugal	3:22.942	3 August	OB
Women's K-2 500 metres	Semifinal	Danuta Kozák; Dóra Bodonyi	Hungary	1:37.912	3 August	OB
Women's K-2 500 metres	Semifinal	Lisa Carrington; Caitlin Regal	New Zealand	1:36.724	3 August	OB
Women's K-1 200 metres	Final	Lisa Carrington	New Zealand	38.120	3 August	OB
Men's C-2 1000 metres	Final	Serguey Torres; Fernando Jorge	Cuba	3:24.995	3 August	OB
Men's K-1 1000 metres	Final	Bálint Kopasz	Hungary	3:20.643	3 August	OB
Women's K-2 500 metres	Final	Lisa Carrington; Caitlin Regal	New Zealand	1:35.785	3 August	OB
Men's K-1 200 metres	Heat	Petter Menning	Sweden	34.698	4 August	OB
Men's K-1 200 metres	Heat	Kolos Csizmadia	Hungary	34.442	4 August	OB
Women's C-1 200 metres	Heat	Liudmyla Luzan	Ukraine	45.571	4 August	OB
Women's C-1 200 metres	Heat	Nevin Harrison	United States	44.938	4 August	OB
Men’s K-2 1000 metres	Heat	Jean van der Westhuyzen; Thomas Green	Australia	3:08.773	4 August	OB
Men's K-1 200 metres	Quarterfinal	Liam Heath	Great Britain	33.985	4 August	OB
Women's C-2 500 metres	Heat	Xu Shixiao; Sun Mengya	China	1:57.870	6 August	OB
Men's K-4 500 metres	Heat	Max Rendschmidt; Ronald Rauhe; Tom Liebscher; Max Lemke	Germany	1:21.890	6 August	OB
Men's K-4 500 metres	Heat	Saúl Craviotto; Marcus Walz; Carlos Arévalo; Rodrigo Germade	Spain	1:21.658	6 August	OB
Women's C-2 500 metres	Final	Xu Shixiao; Sun Mengya	China	1:55.495	7 August	OB

== Track cycling ==
Event	Round	Name	Nation	Time	Date	Record
Women's team pursuit	Qualifying	Franziska Brauße; Lisa Brennauer; Lisa Klein; Mieke Kröger	Germany	4:07.307	2 August	WR
Women's team sprint	First round	Bao Shanju; Zhong Tianshi	China	31.804	2 August	WR
Men's team pursuit	Qualifying	Lasse Norman Hansen; Niklas Larsen; Frederik Rodenberg; Rasmus Pedersen	Denmark	3:45.014	2 August	OR
Women's team pursuit	First round	Katie Archibald; Laura Kenny; Neah Evans; Josie Knight	Great Britain	4:06.748	3 August	WR
Women's team pursuit	First round	Franziska Brauße; Lisa Brennauer; Lisa Klein; Mieke Kröger	Germany	4:06.159	3 August	WR
Men's team sprint	Qualifying	Matthew Richardson; Nathan Hart; Matthew Glaetzer	Australia	42.371	3 August	OR
Men's team sprint	Qualifying	Roy van den Berg; Harrie Lavreysen; Matthijs Büchli	Netherlands	42.134	3 August	OR
Men's team pursuit	First round	Kelland O'Brien; Sam Welsford; Leigh Howard; Luke Plapp	Australia	3:44.902	3 August	OR
Men's team pursuit	First round	Simone Consonni; Filippo Ganna; Francesco Lamon; Jonathan Milan	Italy	3:42.307	3 August	WR
Men's team sprint	First round	Matthew Richardson; Nathan Hart; Matthew Glaetzer	Australia	42.103	3 August	OR
Men's team sprint	First round	Jack Carlin; Jason Kenny; Ryan Owens	Great Britain	41.829	3 August	OR
Men's team sprint	First round	Roy van den Berg; Harrie Lavreysen; Jeffrey Hoogland	Netherlands	41.431	3 August	OR
Women's team pursuit	Final	Franziska Brauße; Lisa Brennauer; Lisa Klein; Mieke Kröger	Germany	4:04.242	3 August	WR
Men's team sprint	Final	Roy van den Berg; Harrie Lavreysen; Jeffrey Hoogland	Netherlands	41.369	3 August	OR
Men's sprint	Qualifying	Jeffrey Hoogland	Netherlands	9.215	4 August	OR
Men's team pursuit	Final	Simone Consonni; Filippo Ganna; Francesco Lamon; Jonathan Milan	Italy	3:42.032	4 August	WR
Women's sprint	Qualifying	Lea Friedrich	Germany	10.310	6 August	OR

== Modern pentathlon ==
Event	Round	Name	Nation	Time/Points	Date	Record
Women's modern pentathlon	Swimming	Gulnaz Gubaydullina	ROC	2:07.31	6 August	OR
Women's modern pentathlon	Fencing (BR)	Annika Schleu	Germany	274 pts	6 August	OR
Women's modern pentathlon	Laser run	Laura Asadauskaitė	Lithuania	11:38.37	6 August	OR
Women's modern pentathlon	Overall	Kate French	Great Britain	1385 pts	6 August	OR
Men's modern pentathlon	Swimming	Amro El Geziry	United States	1:52.96	7 August	OR
Men's modern pentathlon	Laser run	Martin Vlach	Czech Republic	10:30.13	7 August	OR
Men's modern pentathlon	Overall	Joe Choong	Great Britain	1482 pts	7 August	OR

== Rowing ==
World Rowing do not recognize records due to the huge variability that weather conditions can have on times. Instead, they observe best times over the international racing distance of 2000 metres.

Event	Round	Name	Nation	Time	Date	Record
Men's double sculls	Heats	Hugo Boucheron; Matthieu Androdias	France	6:10.45	23 July	OB
Men's double sculls	Heats	Melvin Twellaar; Stef Broenink	Netherlands	6:08.38	23 July	OB
Women's four	Heats	Ellen Hogerwerf; Karolien Florijn; Ymkje Clevering; Veronique Meester	Netherlands	6:33.47	24 July	OB
Women's four	Heats	Lucy Stephan; Rosemary Popa; Jessica Morrison; Annabelle McIntyre	Australia	6:28.76	24 July	OB
Women's double sculls	Final	Nicoleta-Ancuța Bodnar; Simona Radiș	Romania	6:41.03	28 July	OB
Men's double sculls	Final	Hugo Boucheron; Matthieu Androdias	France	6:00.33	28 July	OB
Women's four	Final	Lucy Stephan; Rosemary Popa; Jessica Morrison; Annabelle McIntyre	Australia	6:15.37	28 July	OB
Men's four	Final	Alexander Purnell; Spencer Turrin; Jack Hargreaves; Alexander Hill	Australia	5:42.76	28 July	OB
Men's quadruple sculls	Final	Dirk Uittenbogaard; Abe Wiersma; Tone Wieten; Koen Metsemakers	Netherlands	5:32.03	28 July	WB
Women's quadruple sculls	Final	Chen Yunxia; Zhang Ling; Lü Yang; Cui Xiaotong	China	6:05.13	28 July	WB
Men's lightweight double sculls	Semifinal	Jonathan Rommelmann; Jason Osborne	Germany	6:07.33	28 July	OB
Men's lightweight double sculls	Semifinal	Fintan McCarthy; Paul O'Donovan	Ireland	6:05.33	28 July	WB
Women's lightweight double sculls	Semifinal	Emily Craig; Imogen Grant	Great Britain	6:41.99	28 July	WB
Women's lightweight double sculls	Semifinal	Valentina Rodini; Federica Cesarini	Italy	6:41.36	28 July	WB
Women's coxless pair	Semifinal	Maria Kyridou; Christina Bourmpou	Greece	6:48.70	28 July	WB
Women's coxless pair	Semifinal	Grace Prendergast; Kerri Gowler	New Zealand	6:47.41	28 July	WB
Women's eight	Repechage	Maria-Magdalena Rusu; Viviana Iuliana Bejinariu; Georgiana Dedu; Maria Tivodariu; Ioana Vrînceanu; Amalia Bereș; Mădălina Bereș; Denisa Tîlvescu; Daniela Druncea	Romania	5:52.99	28 July	WB
Women's single sculls	Final	Emma Twigg	New Zealand	7:13.97	30 July	OB
Men's single sculls	Final	Stefanos Ntouskos	Greece	6:40.45	30 July	OB

== Shooting ==
Event	Round	Name	Nation	Score	Date	Record
Women's 10 metre air rifle	Qualification	Jeanette Hegg Duestad	Norway	632.9	24 July	OR
Women's 10 metre air rifle	Final	Yang Qian	China	251.8	24 July	OR
Men's 10 metre air pistol	Final	Javad Foroughi	Iran	244.8	24 July	OR
Women's 10 metre air pistol	Qualification	Jiang Ranxin	China	587	25 July	=WR^{[a]}
Women's 10 metre air pistol	Final	Vitalina Batsarashkina	ROC	240.3	25 July	OR
Men's 10 metre air rifle	Qualification	Yang Haoran	China	632.7	25 July	OR
Men's 10 metre air rifle	Final	William Shaner	United States	251.6	25 July	OR
Women's skeet	Qualification	Wei Meng	China	124	26 July	=WR^{[a]}
Men's skeet	Qualification	Éric Delaunay	France	124	26 July	OR
Men's skeet	Qualification	Tammaro Cassandro	Italy	124	26 July	OR
Women's skeet	Final	Amber English	United States	56	26 July	OR
Men's skeet	Final	Vincent Hancock	United States	59	26 July	OR
Mixed 10 metre air pistol team	Qualification	Manu Bhaker; Saurabh Chaudhary	India	582	27 July	OR
Mixed 10 metre air rifle team	Qualification	Yang Qian; Yang Haoran	China	633.2	27 July	WR
Women's trap	Qualification	Zuzana Rehák-Štefečeková	Slovakia	125	29 July	WR
Women's trap	Final	Zuzana Rehák-Štefečeková	Slovakia	43	29 July	OR
Men's trap	Final	Jiří Lipták	Czech Republic	43	29 July	OR
Men's trap	Final	David Kostelecký	Czech Republic	43	29 July	OR
Women's 25 metre pistol	Final	Vitalina Batsarashkina	ROC	38	30 July	OR
Women's 25 metre pistol	Final	Kim Min-jung	South Korea	38	30 July	OR
Mixed trap team	Qualification	Fátima Gálvez; Alberto Fernández	Spain	148	31 July	OR
Mixed trap team	Qualification	Alessandra Perilli; Gian Marco Berti	San Marino	148	31 July	OR
Women's 50 metre rifle three positions	Qualification	Yulia Zykova	ROC	1182	31 July	OR
Women's 50 metre rifle three positions	Final	Nina Christen	Switzerland	463.9	31 July	OR
Men's 50 metre rifle three positions	Final	Zhang Changhong	China	466.0	2 August	WR

== Sport climbing ==
Event	Round	Name	Nation	Time	Date	Record
Men's combined (speed)	Qualification	Bassa Mawem	France	5.45	3 August	OR
Women's combined (speed)	Qualification	Aleksandra Mirosław	Poland	6.97	4 August	OR
Women's combined (speed)	Final	Aleksandra Mirosław	Poland	6.84	6 August	WR

== Swimming ==
=== Men ===
Event	Round	Name	Nation	Time	Date	Record	Day
Men's 800 metre freestyle	Heats	Mykhailo Romanchuk	Ukraine	7:41.28	27 July	OR	4
Men's 200 metre butterfly	Final	Kristóf Milák	Hungary	1:51.25	28 July	OR	5
Men's 200 metre breaststroke	Final	Zac Stubblety-Cook	Australia	2:06.38	29 July	OR	6
Men's 100 metre freestyle	Final	Caeleb Dressel	United States	47.02	29 July	OR	6
Men's 100 metre butterfly	Heats	Caeleb Dressel	United States	50.39	29 July	OR	6
Men's 100 metre butterfly	Semifinal	Kristóf Milák	Hungary	50.31	30 July	OR	7
Men's 100 metre butterfly	Semifinal	Caeleb Dressel	United States	49.71	30 July	OR	7
Men's 200 metre backstroke	Final	Evgeny Rylov	ROC	1:53.27	30 July	OR	7
Men's 100 metre butterfly	Final	Caeleb Dressel	United States	49.45	31 July	WR	8
Men's 50 metre freestyle	Final	Caeleb Dressel	United States	21.07	1 August	OR	9
Men's 4 × 100 metre medley relay	Final	Ryan Murphy (52.31); Michael Andrew (58.49); Caeleb Dressel (49.03); Zach Apple (46.95)	United States	3:26.78	1 August	WR	9

=== Women ===
Event	Round	Name	Nation	Time	Date	Record	Day
Women's 4 × 100 metre freestyle relay	Final	Bronte Campbell (53.01); Meg Harris (53.09); Emma McKeon (51.35); Cate Campbell (52.24)	Australia	3:29.69	25 July	WR	2
Women's 100 metre freestyle	Final	Sarah Sjöström	Sweden	52.62 r	25 July	OR^{[b]}	2
Women's 100 metre backstroke	Heats	Kylie Masse	Canada	58.17	25 July	OR	2
Women's 100 metre backstroke	Heats	Regan Smith	United States	57.96	25 July	OR	2
Women's 100 metre backstroke	Heats	Kaylee McKeown	Australia	57.88	25 July	OR	2
Women's 100 metre breaststroke	Heats	Tatjana Schoenmaker	South Africa	1:04.82	25 July	OR	2
Women's 100 metre backstroke	Semifinal	Regan Smith	United States	57.86	26 July	OR	3
Women's 1500 metre freestyle	Heats	Katie Ledecky	United States	15:35.35	26 July	OR	3
Women's 100 metre backstroke	Final	Kaylee McKeown	Australia	57.47	27 July	OR	4
Women's 200 metre freestyle	Final	Ariarne Titmus	Australia	1:53.50	28 July	OR	5
Women's 100 metre freestyle	Heats	Emma McKeon	Australia	52.13	28 July	OR	5
Women's 200 metre breaststroke	Heats	Tatjana Schoenmaker	South Africa	2:19.16	28 July	OR	5
Women's 200 metre butterfly	Final	Zhang Yufei	China	2:03.86	29 July	OR	6
Women's 4 × 200 metre freestyle relay	Final	Yang Junxuan (1:54.37); Tang Muhan (1:55.00); Zhang Yufei (1:55.66); Li Bingjie (1:55.30)	China	7:40.33	29 July	WR	6
Women's 200 metre breaststroke	Final	Tatjana Schoenmaker	South Africa	2:18.95	30 July	WR	7
Women's 100 metre freestyle	Final	Emma McKeon	Australia	51.96	30 July	OR	7
Women's 50 metre freestyle	Heats	Emma McKeon	Australia	24.02	30 July	OR	7
Women's 50 metre freestyle	Semifinal	Emma McKeon	Australia	24.00	31 July	OR	8
Women's 50 metre freestyle	Final	Emma McKeon	Australia	23.81	1 August	OR	9
Women's 4 × 100 metre medley relay	Final	Kaylee McKeown (58.01); Chelsea Hodges (1:05.57); Emma McKeon (55.91); Cate Campbell (52.11)	Australia	3:51.60	1 August	OR	9

Legend: r – First leg of relay

- All world records (WR) are consequently Olympic records (OR).

=== Mixed ===
Event	Round	Name	Nation	Time	Date	Record	Day
Mixed 4 × 100 metre medley relay	Heats	Kathleen Dawson (58.50); Adam Peaty (57.08); James Guy (50.58); Freya Anderson (52.59)	Great Britain	3:38.75	29 July	OR	6
Mixed 4 × 100 metre medley relay	Final	Kathleen Dawson (58.80); Adam Peaty (56.78); James Guy (50.00); Anna Hopkin (52.00)	Great Britain	3:37.58	31 July	WR	8

== Weightlifting ==
=== Men ===
Event	Round	Name	Nationality	Weight	Date	Record
Men's 61 kg	Clean & Jerk	Li Fabin	China	172 kg	25 July	OR
Men's 61 kg	Total	Li Fabin	China	313 kg	25 July	OR
Men's 67 kg	Clean & Jerk	Chen Lijun	China	187 kg	25 July	OR
Men's 67 kg	Total	Luis Javier Mosquera	Colombia	331 kg	25 July	OR
Men's 67 kg	Total	Chen Lijun	China	332 kg	25 July	OR
Men's 73 kg	Snatch	Shi Zhiyong	China	163 kg	28 July	OR
Men's 73 kg	Snatch	Shi Zhiyong	China	166 kg	28 July	OR
Men's 73 kg	Clean & Jerk	Shi Zhiyong	China	198 kg	28 July	OR
Men's 73 kg	Total	Shi Zhiyong	China	354 kg	28 July	OR
Men's 73 kg	Total	Shi Zhiyong	China	364 kg	28 July	WR
Men's 81 kg	Snatch	Lü Xiaojun	China	170 kg	31 July	OR
Men's 81 kg	Clean & Jerk	Zacarías Bonnat	Dominican Republic	202 kg	31 July	OR
Men's 81 kg	Clean & Jerk	Lü Xiaojun	China	204 kg	31 July	OR
Men's 81 kg	Total	Lü Xiaojun	China	367 kg	31 July	OR
Men's 81 kg	Total	Lü Xiaojun	China	374 kg	31 July	OR
Men's 96 kg	Clean & Jerk	Fares El-Bakh	Qatar	225 kg	31 July	OR
Men's 96 kg	Total	Fares El-Bakh	Qatar	402 kg	31 July	OR
Men's 109 kg	Snatch	Simon Martirosyan	Armenia	195 kg	3 August	OR
Men's 109 kg	Total	Akbar Djuraev	Uzbekistan	420 kg	3 August	OR
Men's 109 kg	Total	Simon Martirosyan	Armenia	423 kg	3 August	OR
Men's 109 kg	Clean & Jerk	Akbar Djuraev	Uzbekistan	237 kg	3 August	OR
Men's 109 kg	Total	Akbar Djuraev	Uzbekistan	430 kg	3 August	OR
Men's +109 kg	Snatch	Lasha Talakhadze	Georgia	208 kg	4 August	OR
Men's +109 kg	Snatch	Lasha Talakhadze	Georgia	215 kg	4 August	OR
Men's +109 kg	Snatch	Lasha Talakhadze	Georgia	223 kg	4 August	WR
Men's +109 kg	Total	Lasha Talakhadze	Georgia	468 kg	4 August	OR
Men's +109 kg	Clean & Jerk	Lasha Talakhadze	Georgia	255 kg	4 August	OR
Men's +109 kg	Total	Lasha Talakhadze	Georgia	478 kg	4 August	OR
Men's +109 kg	Clean & Jerk	Lasha Talakhadze	Georgia	265 kg	4 August	WR
Men's +109 kg	Total	Lasha Talakhadze	Georgia	488 kg	4 August	WR

=== Women ===
Event	Round	Name	Nationality	Weight	Date	Record
Women's 49 kg	Snatch	Hou Zhihui	China	92 kg	24 July	OR
Women's 49 kg	Snatch	Hou Zhihui	China	94 kg	24 July	OR
Women's 49 kg	Clean & Jerk	Hou Zhihui	China	114 kg	24 July	OR
Women's 49 kg	Clean & Jerk	Saikhom Mirabai Chanu	India	115 kg	24 July	OR
Women's 49 kg	Clean & Jerk	Hou Zhihui	China	116 kg	24 July	OR
Women's 49 kg	Total	Hou Zhihui	China	203 kg	24 July	OR
Women's 49 kg	Total	Hou Zhihui	China	208 kg	24 July	OR
Women's 49 kg	Total	Hou Zhihui	China	210 kg	24 July	OR
Women's 55 kg	Snatch	Muattar Nabieva	Uzbekistan	98 kg	26 July	OR
Women's 55 kg	Clean & Jerk	Liao Qiuyun	China	123 kg	26 July	OR
Women's 55 kg	Clean & Jerk	Hidilyn Diaz	Philippines	124 kg	26 July	OR
Women's 55 kg	Clean & Jerk	Liao Qiuyun	China	126 kg	26 July	OR
Women's 55 kg	Clean & Jerk	Hidilyn Diaz	Philippines	127 kg	26 July	OR
Women's 55 kg	Total	Liao Qiuyun	China	220 kg	26 July	OR
Women's 55 kg	Total	Hidilyn Diaz	Philippines	221 kg	26 July	OR
Women's 55 kg	Total	Liao Qiuyun	China	223 kg	26 July	OR
Women's 55 kg	Total	Hidilyn Diaz	Philippines	224 kg	26 July	OR
Women's 59 kg	Snatch	Kuo Hsing-chun	Chinese Taipei	103 kg	27 July	OR
Women's 59 kg	Clean & Jerk	Kuo Hsing-chun	Chinese Taipei	133 kg	27 July	OR
Women's 59 kg	Total	Kuo Hsing-chun	Chinese Taipei	236 kg	27 July	OR
Women's +87 kg	Snatch	Li Wenwen	China	140 kg	2 August	OR
Women's +87 kg	Clean & Jerk	Li Wenwen	China	173 kg	2 August	OR
Women's +87 kg	Clean & Jerk	Li Wenwen	China	180 kg	2 August	OR
Women's +87 kg	Total	Li Wenwen	China	313 kg	2 August	OR
Women's +87 kg	Total	Li Wenwen	China	320 kg	2 August	OR

== Footnotes ==
1. While Jiang Ranxin and Wei Meng did not break the qualification world records for the women's 10m air pistol or the women's skeet respectively, they did set Olympic records since they were not previously established in those events.
2. Sjöström broke the Olympic record for the women's 100 m freestyle in the women's 4x100 m freestyle relay final.
