= Gao Kaiwen =

Chinese weightlifting coach

Personal information
- Native name: 高凯文
- Nationality: Chinese

Sport
- Sport: Weightlifting
- Team: Chinese Bayi; Chinese Army

Gao Kaiwen (Chinese: 高凯文) is a Chinese weightlifting coach. He has coached 2020 Summer Olympics gold medalist Hidilyn Diaz, who is the first Olympic gold medalist of the Philippines. He has also coached Chinese weightlifters Chen Xiexia who competed in the 2008 Summer Olympics, and Zhou Lulu who was a gold medalist at the 2012 Summer Olympics.

Gao also served as coach of the Chinese Bayi weightlifting team and was head coach of women's team of the Chinese army.

== Coaching Hidilyn Diaz ==
Gao Kaiwen was recruited to coach Hidilyn Diaz of the Philippines two months prior to the 2018 Asian Games in Jakarta, Indonesia where Diaz clinched a gold medal. He also introduced new routines and heavier weights in Diaz's training. Gao was joined in by other coaches and officials including second coach Julius Naranjo. Diaz's coaching staff became known as "Team HD".

In a lead up to the 2020 Summer Olympics, which was later postponed by a year due to the COVID-19 pandemic, Diaz went to Malaysia in February 2020 following the advice of Gao so she could be more focused in qualifying for a berth in the Olympics. Diaz managed to qualify but Diaz was forced to spend most of her time training in Malaysia due to logistical issues posed by COVID-19 related travel restrictions.

Diaz competing in the women's 55 kg lifted 97 kg in the snatch and 127 kg in the clean and jerk for a total score of 224 kg. Diaz bested Liao Qiuyun who settled for silver with the latter lifting 126 kg. Liao's coaching staff was reportedly disappointed with Gao for not sharing the extent of Diaz's capability.

After Diaz's Olympic stint, Gao requested for an early termination of his contract which was originally set to last until December 2021 in order to care for his family. Team HD is planning to tap the services of Gao again in a consultancy role.
