= Philippine Senate Medal of Excellence =

Award conferred by the Senate of the Philippines

Awarded by the Senate of the Philippines
- Type: Order of merit
- Established: 2021
- Country: Philippines
- Eligibility: Filipino nationality
- Criteria: Distinguished merits

The Philippine Senate Medal of Excellence is an award conferred by the Senate of the Philippines.

== History ==
The Senate of the Philippines under its 18th Congress instituted the Philippine Senate Medal of Excellence on August 23, 2021 through the adoption of Resolution No. 781, to be able to "recognize, honor, and commend outstanding Filipinos for their exemplary service, outstanding achievements, and invaluable contributions to nation-building".

The first set of awards were conferred on September 6, 2021 to the four Filipino 2020 Summer Olympics medalists including Hidilyn Diaz, the first-ever Olympic gold medalist who competed for the country.

The awarding of the Nobel Peace Prize to journalist Maria Ressa, who is known as a critic of President Rodrigo Duterte, caused a debate within the Senate if all Senators must unanimously vote to confer the Medal of Excellence to a potential recipient who was awarded one of the five named recognitions in the Resolution No. 781 or if they are awarded "automatically".

== Eligibility ==
The awarding process of the Philippine Senate Medal of Excellence is designed to be restrictive. It is conferred to Philippine institutions and Filipino winners of one of the five named international recognitions namely:

- Nobel Prize
- Pulitzer Prize
- Turing Award
- Ramon Magsaysay Award
- An Olympic medal

== Recipients ==
| Recipient | Recognition |
|---|---|
| Hidilyn Diaz | 2020 Summer Olympics gold medalist (Weightlifting) |
| Carlo Paalam | 2020 Summer Olympics silver medalist (Boxing) |
| Nesthy Petecio | 2020 Summer Olympics silver medalist (Boxing) |
| Eumir Marcial | 2020 Summer Olympics bronze medalist (Boxing) |

== See also ==
- Philippine Congressional Medal (House of Representatives)
