= List of Olympic medalists for the Philippines =

Philippines at the Olympics
- Flag of the Philippines
- IOC code: PHI
- NOC: Philippine Olympic Committee
- Website: www.olympic.ph
- Medals: Gold 3 Silver 5 Bronze 10 Total 18

Summer appearances
- 1924; 1928; 1932; 1936; 1948; 1952; 1956; 1960; 1964; 1968; 1972; 1976; 1980; 1984; 1988; 1992; 1996; 2000; 2004; 2008; 2012; 2016; 2020; 2024; 2028

Winter appearances
- 1972; 1976–1984; 1988; 1992; 1994–2010; 2014; 2018; 2022; 2026

The Philippines made its debut in the Olympics during the 1924 Summer Olympics and won its first medal during the 1928 Summer Olympics when Teófilo Yldefonso gained a bronze medal. During the 1932 Summer Olympics, the Philippines gained three medals, the most medals given for the country in a specific competition until 2020. The Philippines gained its first gold medal at the 2020 Summer Olympics when Hidilyn Diaz won Women's 55 kilogram in Weightlifting. A total of 14 athletes have won 3 gold medals, 5 silver medals, and 10 bronze medals for the Philippines at the Summer Olympics. Additionally, one athlete has gained a medal in the Youth Olympic Games, another won a gold medal in a mixed team, and three more have gained medals at demonstration sports.

== History ==
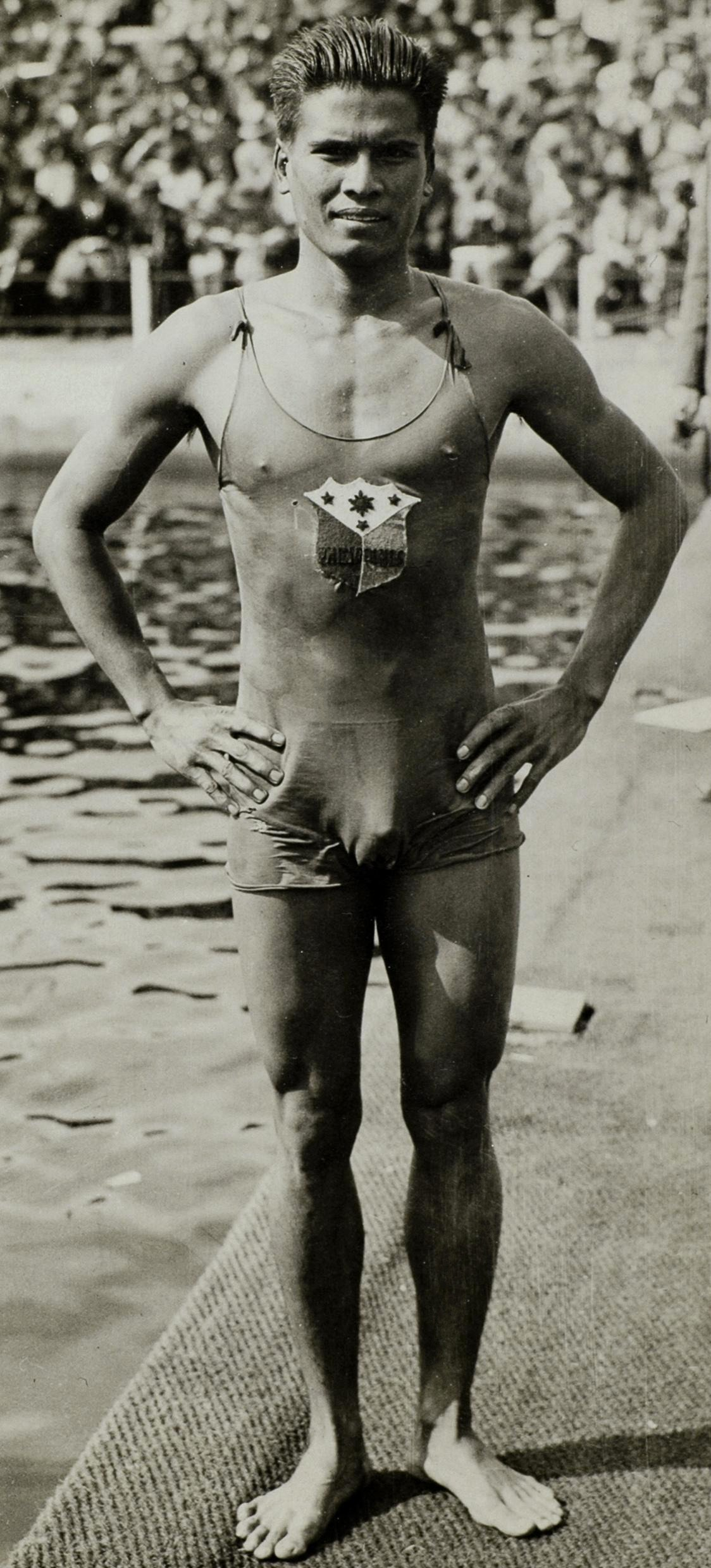
Teófilo Yldefonso, the first athlete to win an Olympic medal for the Philippines

The Philippines made its Olympic debut during the 1924 Summer Olympics held in Paris, France with David Nepomuceno as the sole participant, competing in the men's 100 metres and 200 metres athletic events. In the next Olympic Games in Amsterdam, Netherlands, the Philippines won its first medal when swimmer Teófilo Yldefonso finished third in the men's 200 metre breaststroke swimming event. In the Los Angeles 1932 Olympics, the country was awarded three bronze medals, the most for the Filipinos until the 2020 Summer Olympics. The country also won another bronze medal at the 1936 Summer Olympics, when Miguel White gained a bronze medal in the men's 400 metre hurdles athletic event.

After independence from the United States, the Philippines did not win another medal until the 1964 Summer Olympics in Tokyo, Japan, when boxer Anthony Villanueva was beaten in the gold medal bout, thus claiming silver. The next Olympic medals for the Philippines came from boxing, with Leopoldo Serantes winning bronze at Seoul 1988, Roel Velasco winning another bronze four years later in Barcelona, Spain, and his brother Mansueto "Onyok" Velasco claiming silver after losing in the gold medal bout in the 1996 Summer Olympics in Atlanta, United States.

After a long medal drought in four Summer Olympic Games, from 2000 to 2012, the Philippines won another medal at the 2016 Summer Olympics when Hidilyn Diaz finished second in the women's 53 kg weightlifting in Rio de Janeiro, Brazil. Four years later, Diaz won the country's first ever gold medal in the Olympic Games.

In the 2020 Summer Olympics, the Philippines had its highest medal haul in Olympic history with four, eclipsing the three medals the country won in 1932. Together with Hidilyn Diaz's gold medal finish in the women's 55 kg weightlifting category, the other athletes finishing with medals were Nesthy Petecio, winning a silver medal in the women's featherweight boxing finals, Carlo Paalam, also winning a silver medal in the men's flyweight boxing finals, and

Eumir Marcial, with a bronze medal finish in the men's middleweight boxing category semifinals. In the 2024 Summer Olympics, the Philippines won two gold medals when Carlos Yulo finished first in the men's floor exercise and men's vault artistic gymnastics finals in Paris, France. Aside from Yulo, two other athletes won medals, specifically Aira Villegas, with a bronze medal finish in the women's flyweight boxing category semi-finals, and Nesthy Petecio, with a bronze medal in the women's featherweight boxing category semi-finals.

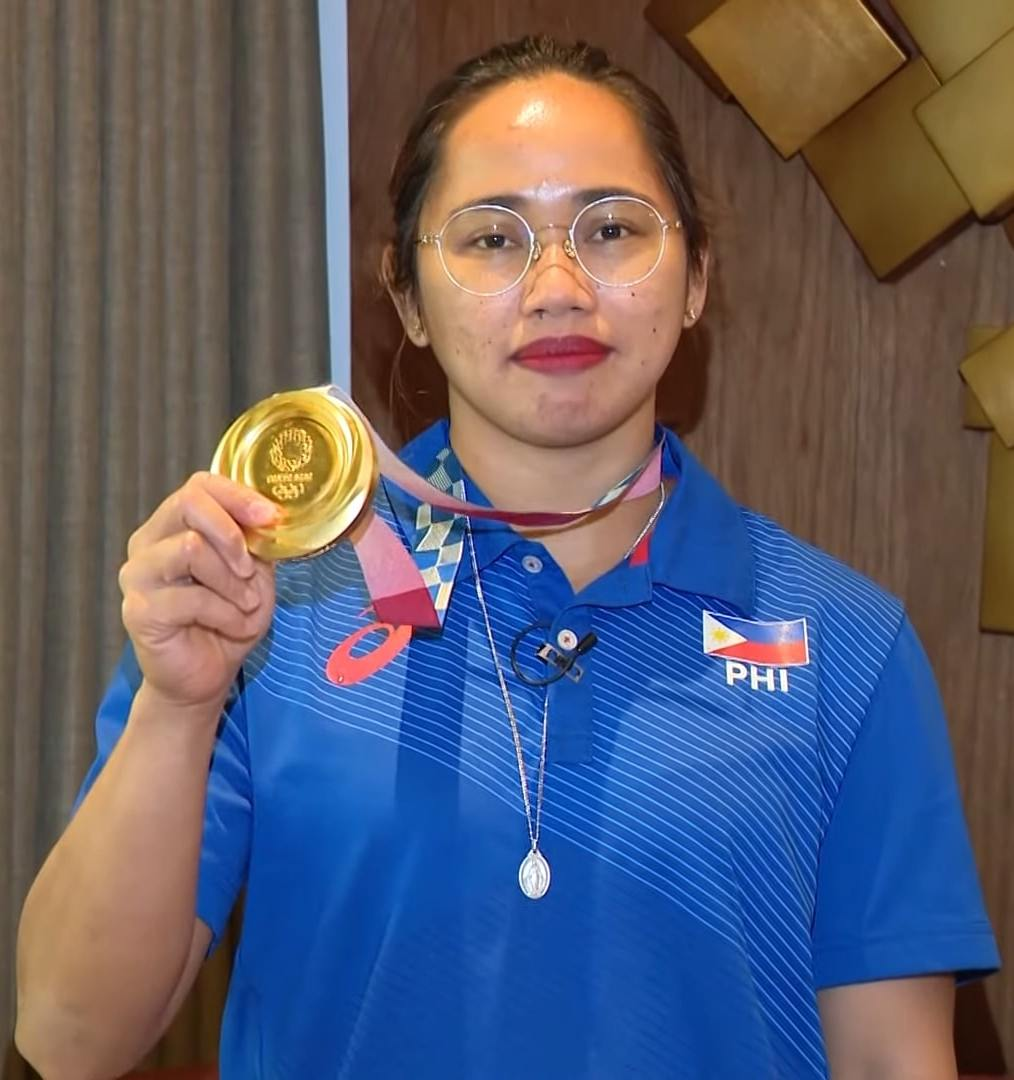
Hidilyn Diaz, the first athlete to win an Olympic gold medal for the Philippines

== List of medalists ==
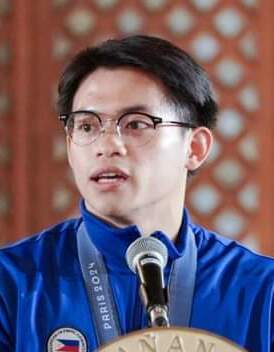
Carlos Yulo became the first two-time Olympic gold medalist for the Philippines at the 2024 Summer Olympics in Paris.

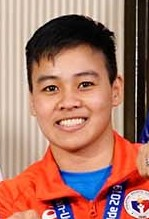
Nesthy Petecio was the first Filipino boxer to win multiple Olympic medals with one silver and one bronze.

=== Summer Olympics ===
A total of 14 athletes have won 3 gold medals, 5 silver medals, and 10 bronze medals for the Philippines at the Summer Olympics. These Olympians are entitled to government incentives under Republic Act 9064 and Republic Act 10699.

Medals gained from the Summer Olympics
Name	Medal	Sport	Event	Year	Location	Ref.
Teófilo Yldefonso	(bronze) Bronze	Swimming	Men's 200 metre breaststroke	1928	Amsterdam, Netherlands	
Simeon Toribio	(bronze) Bronze	Athletics	Men's high jump	1932	Los Angeles, United States	
Teófilo Yldefonso	(bronze) Bronze	Swimming	Men's 200 metre breaststroke	1932	Los Angeles, United States	
José Villanueva	(bronze) Bronze	Boxing	Men's bantamweight	1932	Los Angeles, United States	
Miguel White	(bronze) Bronze	Athletics	Men's 400 metre hurdles	1936	Berlin, Germany	
Anthony Villanueva	(silver) Silver	Boxing	Men's featherweight	1964	Tokyo, Japan	
Leopoldo Serantes	(bronze) Bronze	Boxing	Men's light flyweight	1988	Seoul, South Korea	
Roel Velasco	(bronze) Bronze	Boxing	Men's light flyweight	1992	Barcelona, Spain	
Onyok Velasco	(silver) Silver	Boxing	Men's light flyweight	1996	Atlanta, United States	
Hidilyn Diaz	(silver) Silver	Weightlifting	Women's 53 kg	2016	Rio de Janeiro, Brazil	
Hidilyn Diaz	(gold) Gold	Weightlifting	Women's 55 kg	2020	Tokyo, Japan	
Nesthy Petecio	(silver) Silver	Boxing	Women's featherweight	2020	Tokyo, Japan	
Carlo Paalam	(silver) Silver	Boxing	Men's flyweight	2020	Tokyo, Japan	
Eumir Marcial	(bronze) Bronze	Boxing	Men's middleweight	2020	Tokyo, Japan	
Carlos Yulo	(gold) Gold	Gymnastics	Men's floor exercise	2024	Paris, France	
Carlos Yulo	(gold) Gold	Gymnastics	Men's vault	2024	Paris, France	
Aira Villegas	(bronze) Bronze	Boxing	Women's flyweight	2024	Paris, France	
Nesthy Petecio	(bronze) Bronze	Boxing	Women's featherweight	2024	Paris, France	

=== Youth Summer Olympics ===
Two medals have been credited to the Philippines. (Note: This excludes medals won in mixed international team events which are credited to the Mixed-NOCs teams.)

Medals gained from the Youth Summer Olympics
Name	Medal	Sport	Event	Year	Location	Ref.
Christian Tio	(silver) Silver	Sailing	Men's Kiteboarding - IKA Twin Tip Racing	2018	Buenos Aires, Argentina	
Naomi Cesar	(silver) Silver	Athletics	Women's 800m	2026	Dakar, Senegal	
Pi Durden Wangkay	(bronze) Bronze	Athletics	Men's 200m	2026	Dakar, Senegal	

== Other medalists ==
=== Mixed-NOCs medalists ===
Luis Gabriel Moreno, who did not officially medal for the Philippines at the 2014 Youth Summer Olympics, did win a medal in the Mixed team event along with Chinese archer Li Jiaman which was credited to the Mixed-NOCs team (MIX) rather than the Philippines (PHI) or China (CHN).

Medals gained from Mixed teams
Name	Medal	Sport	Event	Year	Location	Ref.
Luis Gabriel Moreno (Note: In IOC records, this is credited as a gold medal for "mixed teams", or teams that are composed of members from more than one National Olympic Committee (NOC).) With Li Jiaman (China)	(gold) Gold	Archery	Mixed team	2014	Nanjing, China	

=== Demonstration sports ===
The following are medalists in official demonstration sports in the Summer Olympic Games. (Note: This excludes the Wushu Tournament Beijing 2008, which was not an official Olympic demonstration sport for the 2008 edition.)

Medals gained from Demonstration sports
Name	Medal	Sport	Event	Year	Location	Ref.
Arianne Cerdeña	(gold) Gold	Bowling	Women's tournament	1988	Seoul, South Korea	
Stephen Fernandez	(bronze) Bronze	Taekwondo	Men's bantamweight	1992	Barcelona, Spain	
Beatriz Lucero	(bronze) Bronze	Taekwondo	Women's featherweight	1992	Barcelona, Spain	

== Medal tally by sport ==
=== Summer Olympics ===
Medal tally by sport (Summer Olympics)
Sport	Gold	Silver	Bronze	Total
Gymnastics	2	0	0	2
Weightlifting	1	1	0	2
Boxing	0	4	6	10
Athletics	0	0	2	2
Swimming	0	0	2	2
Total	3	5	10	18

=== Youth Summer Olympics ===
Medal tally by sport (Youth Summer Olympics)
Sport	Gold	Silver	Bronze	Total
Sailing	0	1	0	1
Athletics	0	1	0	1
Total	0	2	0	2

==== Mixed-NOCs participation ====
Medal tally by sport (Mixed teams)
Sport	Gold	Silver	Bronze	Total
Archery	1	0	0	1
Total	1	0	0	1

== Medal tally by individual ==
Medal tally by individual
Person	Gold	Silver	Bronze	Total
Carlos Yulo	2	0	0	2
Hidilyn Diaz	1	1	0	2
Nesthy Petecio	0	1	1	2
Anthony Villanueva	0	1	0	1
Onyok Velasco	0	1	0	1
Carlo Paalam	0	1	0	1
Teófilo Yldefonso	0	0	2	2
Simeon Toribio	0	0	1	1
José Villanueva	0	0	1	1
Miguel White	0	0	1	1
Leopoldo Serantes	0	0	1	1
Roel Velasco	0	0	1	1
Eumir Marcial	0	0	1	1
Aira Villegas	0	0	1	1
Total	3	5	10	18

=== Multiple medalists ===
According to official data of the International Olympic Committee, this is a list of people who have won two or more Olympic medals for the Philippines.

- ‡ - Still an active competitor

Multi-medalists
Athlete	Sport	Years	Games	Gender	1st place, gold medalist(s)	2nd place, silver medalist(s)	3rd place, bronze medalist(s)	Total
Carlos Yulo ‡	Gymnastics	2020–2024	Summer	Men	2	0	0	2
Hidilyn Diaz ‡	Weightlifting	2008–2020	Summer	Women	1	1	0	2
Nesthy Petecio ‡	Boxing	2020–2024	Summer	Women	0	1	1	2
Teófilo Yldefonso	Swimming	1928–1936	Summer	Men	0	0	2	2
