= Philippine Congressional Medal (House of Representatives) =

Congressional Medal

Awarded by the House of Representatives
- Type: Order of merit
- Country: Philippines
- Eligibility: Filipino nationality (CMD); Olympic gold medalist for the Philippines (CME)
- Criteria: Distinguished merits
- Classes: Acchievement; Distinction; Excellence

The House of Representatives of the Philippines has three awards they confer to individuals; namely the Congressional Medal of Achievement (CMA), the Congressional Medal of Distinction (CMD), and the Congressional Medal of Excellence (CME).

== Awards ==
The three congressional awards conferred by the House of Representatives are:

- Congressional Medal of Achievement (CMA): for "political, economic, and cultural leaders, who have distinguished themselves through their life-work and their vision" (2002).
- Congressional Medal of Distinction (CMD): for Filipino achievers in sports, business, medicine, science, and arts and culture.
- Congressional Medal of Excellence (CME): For "exceptional modern-day national heroes in sports who win the gold medal in the Olympics". The award was instituted as a response to Hidilyn Diaz winning the Philippines' first ever Olympic gold medal at the 2020 Summer Olympics. (2021)

== Recipients ==
=== Congressional Medal of Achievement ===
Recipient	Background	Reason	Year conferred	Ref.
René van der Linden	Dutch diplomat and President of the Parliamentary Assembly of the Council of Europe	Role in the creation of the Asian Parliamentary Assembly	2005	
Wu Hongbao	Chinese Ambassador to the Philippines	Improvement of the China–Philippines relations	2005	
Manny Pacquiao	Filipino professional boxer		2005	
A. P. J. Abdul Kalam	President of India	Improvement of the India–Philippines relations	2006	
Lea Salonga	Filipino musical theater actress		2007	
Jesse Robredo	Filipino politician	Secretary of the Interior and Local Government	2012	
Vicente Paterno	Filipino politician and businessman	"Distinguished public servant and advocate of honourable governance"; Senator of the Philippines (1987–1992), Deputy Executive Secretary for Energy (1986–1987), chairman of the Board of Investments (1970–1974), Minister of Industry (1974–1979), Minister of Public Highways (1979–1980), Founding chairman of the Philippine Seven Corporation, President of the Philippine National Oil Company	2014	
Zhao Jianhua	Chinese Ambassador to the Philippines	Improvement of the China–Philippines relations	2019	
Igor Khovaev	Russian Ambassador to the Philippines	Improvement of the Philippines–Russia relations	2020	

=== Congressional Medal of Distinction ===
Recipient	Background	Reason	Year conferred	Ref.
Karen Ibasco	Beauty pageant participant	Miss Earth 2017 winner	2017	
John Riel Casimero	Professional boxer	Winning the WBO Bantamweight title in his fight against Zolani Tete of South Africa on November 30, 2019	2020	
Manny Pacquiao	Professional boxer	For the unprecedent feat of winning an eighth world boxing title	2010	
Hidilyn Diaz	Weightlifter	2016 Summer Olympics silver medalist	2016	
Carlo Paalam	Boxer	2020 Summer Olympics silver medalist	2021	
Nesthy Petecio	Boxer	2020 Summer Olympics silver medalist	2021	
Eumir Marcial	Boxer	2020 Summer Olympics bronze medalist	2021	

=== Congressional Medal of Excellence ===
Recipient	Sport	Event	Olympics		Year conferred	Ref.
Recipient	Sport	Event	Edition	Host	Year conferred	Ref.
Hidilyn Diaz	Weightlifting	Women's 55 kg	2020 Summer Olympics	Tokyo, Japan	2021	

== See also ==
- Philippine Senate Medal of Excellence
