= Philippines at the 2020 Summer Olympics =

- IOC code: PHI
- NOC: Philippine Olympic Committee
- Website: www.olympic.ph

in Tokyo, Japan July 23, 2021 – August 8, 2021
- Competitors: 19 (9 men and 10 women) in 11 sports
- Flag bearers (opening): Kiyomi Watanabe; Eumir Marcial
- Flag bearer (closing): Nesthy Petecio
- Medals Ranked 50th: Gold 1 Silver 2 Bronze 1 Total 4

Summer Olympics appearances (overview)
- 1924; 1928; 1932; 1936; 1948; 1952; 1956; 1960; 1964; 1968; 1972; 1976; 1980; 1984; 1988; 1992; 1996; 2000; 2004; 2008; 2012; 2016; 2020; 2024

The Philippines competed at the 2020 Summer Olympics in Tokyo. Originally scheduled to take place from 24 July to 9 August 2020, the Games were postponed to 23 July to 8 August 2021 due to the COVID-19 pandemic. Since the nation's official debut in 1924, Filipino athletes have appeared in every edition of the Summer Olympic Games except the 1980 Summer Olympics in Moscow because of the nation's partial support for the US-led boycott.

The Philippine Olympic Committee fielded a team of 19 athletes, nine men and ten women, to compete in eleven different sports at the Games. The Philippines marked its Olympic debut in skateboarding (new to the 2020 Games), as well as its return to gymnastics and rowing.

The Philippines left Tokyo with its best Olympic performance ever, bringing home four medals (a record later surpassed in Paris 2024). This surpassed the three medals the country won at the 1932 Summer Olympics in Los Angeles. The first-ever gold medal for the Philippines was won by weightlifter Hidilyn Diaz. The country's other medals, all in boxing, were a silver courtesy of Nesthy Petecio, a silver medal by Carlo Paalam, and a bronze medal by Eumir Marcial.

== Medalists ==
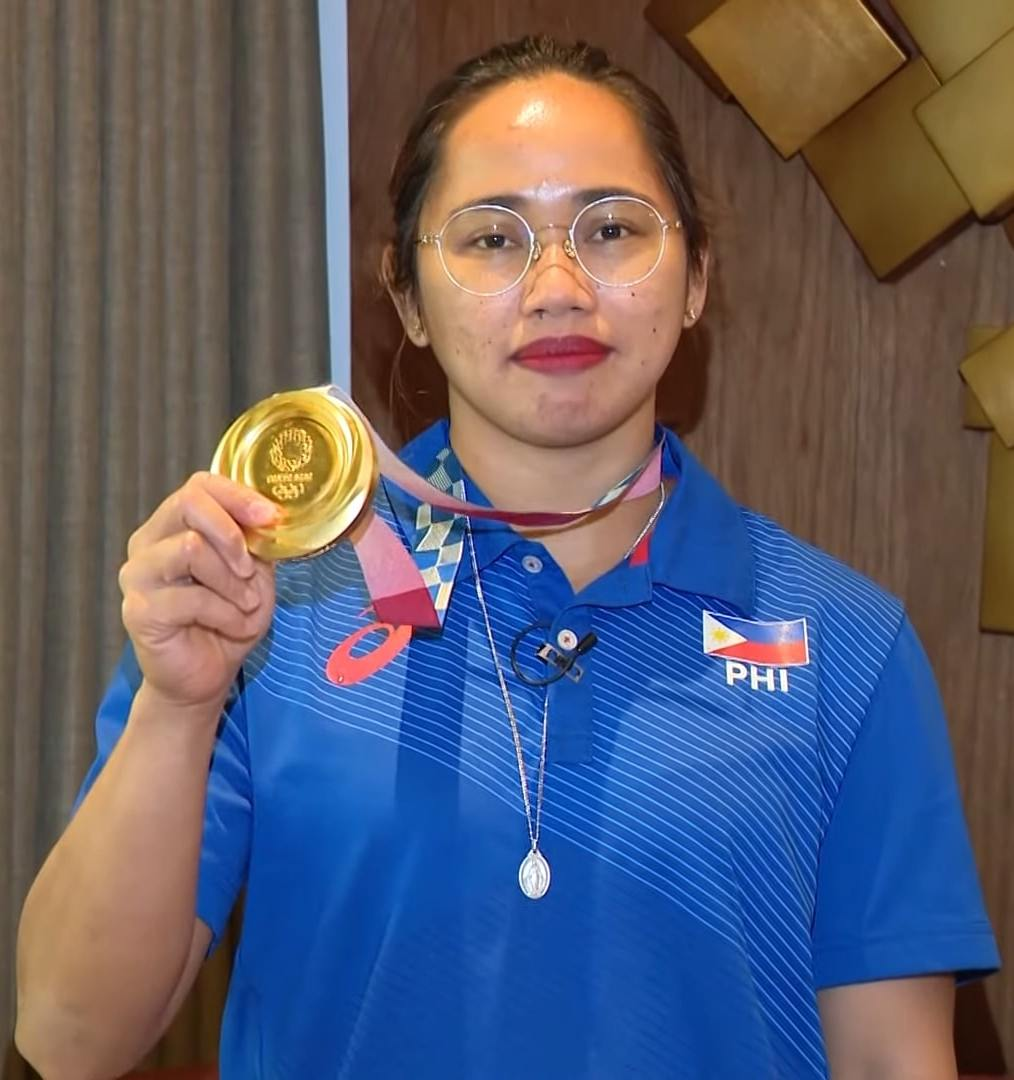
Weightlifter Hidilyn Diaz with her gold medal. Diaz is the Philippines' first ever Olympic gold medalist.

Medal	Name	Sport	Event	Date
Gold	Hidilyn Diaz	Weightlifting	Women's 55 kg	26 July
Silver	Nesthy Petecio	Boxing	Women's featherweight	3 August
Silver	Carlo Paalam	Boxing	Men's flyweight	7 August
Bronze	Eumir Marcial	Boxing	Men's middleweight	5 August

== Background ==
=== Administration ===
Philippine Football Federation president Mariano Araneta was appointed in August 2019 as chef de mission of the Filipino delegation to the Games by Philippine Olympic Committee (POC) president Abraham Tolentino. Araneta was selected for his availability because his national sports association did not qualify a team for the Olympics. Araneta succeeded Joey Romasanta who had been appointed as chef de mission for the same edition of the Olympics by Tolentino's predecessor, Ricky Vargas.

The Philippine Sports Commission, the Philippine government's sports agency, provided ₱200 million for the country's participation in the Olympics.

The Philippines also sent five technical officials to the 2020 Summer Olympics: Karla Cabrera (archery), Marilee Estampador (fencing), Len Escollante (canoe), Jercyl Lerin (rowing) and Ferdinand Pascual (basketball).

=== Qualification ===
The Philippines aimed to qualify around 38 athletes for the Olympics, but only 19 athletes ultimately qualified. The Philippines failed attempts to qualify athletes in archery, basketball (including 3x3), cycling, fencing, karate, surfing, and windsurfing. The country also intended to qualify athletes in canoeing, but had to withdraw its athletes from the Asian qualifiers due to a positive COVID-19 result.

=== Opening and closing ceremonies ===
For the opening ceremony, it was announced on 7 July 2021 that pole vaulter EJ Obiena and judoka Kiyomi Watanabe would be the flagbearers of the Philippines. However, Obiena was dropped as one of the flagbearers, after a new protocol was introduced which required flagbearers to be in Tokyo forty-eight hours prior to the opening ceremony. Obiena was set to arrive on 23 July, the date when the opening ceremony was scheduled to be held. Boxer Eumir Marcial was announced as Obiena's replacement. In the Parade of Nations, the Philippine delegation was represented by six officials and two athletes. The officials wore ready-to-wear barong from the Filipino clothing company Kultura, topped off by a shawl made by Filipino fashion designer Rajo Laurel. The two athletes who served as flagbearers wore the tracksuits supplied by Asics. Boxer Nesthy Petecio was named as flagbearer for the closing ceremony.

=== Impact of the COVID-19 pandemic ===
The delegation was affected by travel restrictions imposed as a response to the COVID-19 pandemic. Filipino businessman Enrique Razon has pledged to procure COVID-19 vaccines for the Philippine delegation from Moderna. Some athletes who had training outside the Philippines were vaccinated in their host countries.

The Philippine delegation was somewhat affected by the disease, with at least two officials contracting COVID-19. No Filipino athlete tested positive for COVID-19 during the duration of the games. A sports official was unable to join the delegation after testing positive for COVID-19 when they were still in Manila. Another member of Team Philippines, a foreign coach who arrived in Tokyo was suspected to have contracted COVID-19 after routine testing yielded false positive and negative results. The coach, who at one point experienced fever, was isolated from the rest of the delegation. Rower Cris Nievarez was a close contact of a COVID-19 case which caused uncertainty whether he would be able to compete. Nievarez was able to take part in his event.

=== Broadcasters ===
Name	Type	Ref
Cignal TV	Free-to-air, Pay and over-the-top	
PLDT	Pay and over-the-top	

== Competitors ==
In total, the Philippines qualified nineteen athletes competing in eleven sports for the 2020 Summer Olympics, making the delegation the largest since the 2000 Summer Olympics, when the country fielded 20 athletes. For the first time, there were more women (10 athletes) than men (9 athletes) competing for the country in the Olympics. The average age of the Philippines' athletes was 25 years; the oldest member being Juvic Pagunsan (43 years old) and the youngest being Yuka Saso (20 years old). All athletes except for Hidilyn Diaz (who has made four consecutive appearances since the 2008 Summer Olympics) were first time competitors in the games.

The following is the list of number of competitors in the Games.

Sport	Men	Women	Total
Athletics	1	1	2
Boxing	2	2	4
Golf	1	2	3
Gymnastics	1	0	1
Judo	0	1	1
Rowing	1	0	1
Shooting	1	0	1
Skateboarding	0	1	1
Swimming	1	1	2
Taekwondo	1	0	1
Weightlifting	0	2	2
Total	9	10	19

== Athletics ==
Filipino athletes competed in the following track and field events (up to a maximum of 3 athletes in each event):

Pole vaulter EJ Obiena, who was the first athlete of the Philippines to qualify for the Olympics in 2019, underwent training with Ukrainian coach Vitaly Petrov. Kristina Marie Knott, who trained under Rohsaan Griffin. Knott aimed to compete in the women's 200 m, but participated in a number of 100 m races in the run-up to the Olympics due to a dearth of 200 m competitions, thanks to the COVID-19 pandemic. Obiena and Knott were due to move to the Athletes Village for their stay in Tokyo, but the Philippine Athletics Track and Field Association (PATAFA) decided against this, as a coach in the village had tested positive for COVID-19. PATAFA decided that the athletes should remain in a nearby hotel and hired the service of a private vehicle to transport its athletes to and from the training venue.

Obiena, who had a personal best of 5.91 meters in the men's pole vault, cleared 5.75 meters to qualify for the final on his third attempt. However, after he failed to clear 5.80 meters, he ultimately placed eleventh.

Knott finished last among five runners in her heat in the women's 200 m. Experiencing heat exhaustion, she was rushed to a nearby medical station after she finished her race. She finished thirty-seventh overall among the 41 runners in the heats.

Key

- Note–Ranks given for track events are within the athlete's heat only
- Q = Qualified for the next round
- q = Qualified for the next round as a fastest loser or, in field events, by position without achieving the qualifying target
- NR = National record
- N/A = Round not applicable for the event
- Bye = Athlete not required to compete in round

Track & road events

Athlete	Event	Heat		Semifinal		Final	
Athlete	Event	Result	Rank	Result	Rank	Result	Rank
Kristina Marie Knott	Women's 200 m	23.80	5	Did not advance			

Field events

Athlete	Event	Qualification		Final	
Athlete	Event	Distance	Position	Distance	Position
EJ Obiena	Men's pole vault	5.75	10 q	5.70	=11

== Boxing ==
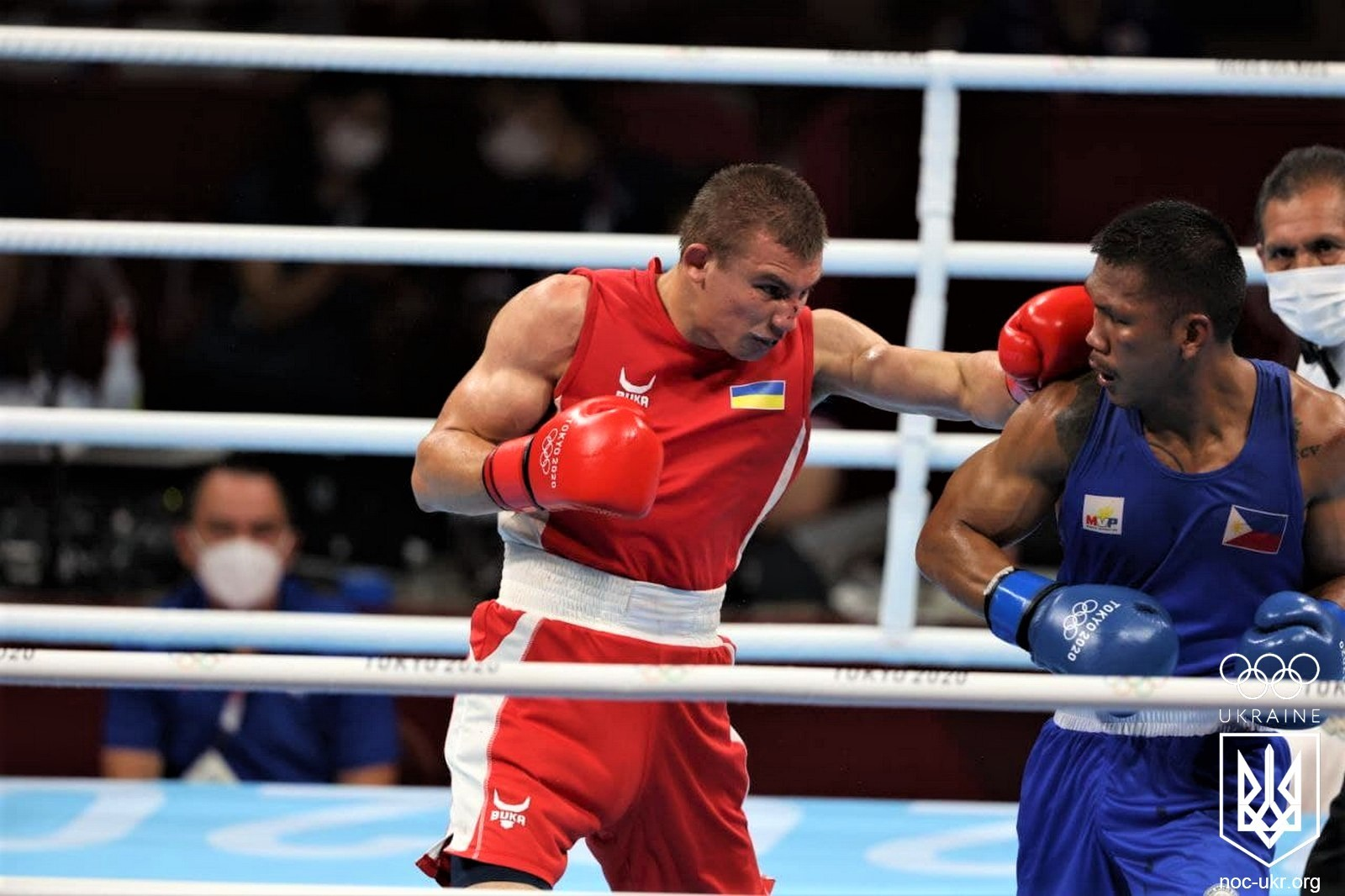
Eumir Marcial (right) going against of Oleksandr Khyzhniak Ukraine in the men's middleweight semifinals.

The Philippines entered four boxers (two per gender) into the Olympic tournament. 2019 world silver medalist Eumir Marcial (men's middleweight) and 2019 Southeast Asian Games runner-up Irish Magno (women's flyweight) secured places in their respective weight divisions. Reigning world champion Nesthy Petecio (women's featherweight) and Carlo Paalam (men's flyweight) completed the nation's boxing lineup by topping the list of eligible boxers from Asia and Oceania in their respective weight divisions after the World Olympic Boxing Qualifier tournament, due to be held in Paris, France, was cancelled.

Quarantine measures imposed in the Philippines in response to the COVID-19 pandemic had an impact on training, with some boxers reportedly gaining an extra 10 kilograms (22 lb) of weight due a lack of exercise while stranded in their homes. Eumir Marcial prepared for the Olympics in the United States, while the three other qualified boxers were sent to a training camp in Thailand. The boxing team trained with Australian consultant coach Don Abnett. The draw which determined the Filipino boxers' opponent was held on 22 July 2021.

Three out of the four boxers ultimately won a medal. Irish Magno lost to Jutamas Jitpong in the round of 16, eliminating her from contention for a podium finish. Nesthy Petecio progressed all the way to the gold medal match, but lost to Japanese boxer Sena Irie, winning silver instead. Petecio became the first female Olympic medalist in boxing for the Philippines. Carlo Paalam and Eumir Marcial won silver and bronze, respectively.

Athlete	Event	Round of 32	Round of 16	Quarterfinals	Semifinals	Final	
Athlete	Event	Opposition Result	Opposition Result	Opposition Result	Opposition Result	Opposition Result	Rank
Carlo Paalam	Men's flyweight	Irvine (IRL); W 4–1	Flissi (ALG); W 5–0	Zoirov (UZB); W 4–0	Tanaka (JPN); W 5–0	Yafai (GBR); L 1–4	2nd place, silver medalist(s)
Eumir Marcial	Men's middleweight	Bye	Nemouchi (ALG); W RSC–I	Darchinyan (ARM); W KO	Khyzhniak (UKR); L 2–3	Did not advance	3rd place, bronze medalist(s)
Irish Magno	Women's flyweight	Ongare (KEN); W 5–0	Jitpong (THA); L 0–5	Did not advance			
Nesthy Petecio	Women's featherweight	Matshu (COD); W 5–0	Lin Y-t (TPE); W 3–2	Arias (COL); W 5–0	Testa (ITA); W 4–1	Irie (JPN); L 0–5	2nd place, silver medalist(s)

== Golf ==
The Philippines entered three golfers (one male and two female) into the Olympic tournament. Juvic Pagunsan (world no. 216), Yuka Saso (world no. 8), and Bianca Pagdanganan (world no. 165) qualified directly among the top 60 eligible players for their respective events based on the IGF World Rankings.

Athlete	Event	Round 1	Round 2	Round 3	Round 4	Total		
Athlete	Event	Score	Score	Score	Score	Score	Par	Rank
Juvic Pagunsan	Men's	66	73	76	70	285	+1	55
Bianca Pagdanganan	Women's	69	71	71	74	285	+1	=43
Yuka Saso	Women's	74	68	67	65	274	−10	=9

== Gymnastics ==
=== Artistic ===
The Philippines entered an artistic gymnast into the Olympic competition for the first time since 1968. Nineteen-year-old Carlos Yulo booked a spot in the men's individual all-around and apparatus events by topping the list of twelve gymnasts eligible for qualification at the 2019 World Championships in Stuttgart, Germany. Yulo is the first Filipino born in the 2000s to qualify for the Summer Olympics.

Yulo, after competing at the 2019 Southeast Asian Games in the Philippines, went to Japan to prepare for the Olympics. However, he had an eight-month hiatus, with his next competition after the SEA Games being the All-Japan Senior Gymnastics Championships held in September 2020. He was considered a strong contender to win the country's first gold medal in the floor exercise, his signature event.

In the event, Yulo qualified only for the vault finals. In the floor exercise, Yulo failed to execute a landing in the early part of his routine. His second landing was self-described as "not good either". Yulo insisted that he was not affected by pressure or nervousness during his floor exercise performance and dismissed reports that he was nursing an injury, which he said he had sustained over three months ago. Yulo's coach Munehiro Kugiyama took responsibility for Yulo's failure to advance to the floor exercise finals.

Yulo stated that he did not expect to qualify for the vault finals, and admitted his surprise with his performance in that apparatus' qualifiers. Tempering expectations that he would medal in vault, he nevertheless pledged to improve his previous score. Yulo finished fourth in the vault finals. Yulo incurred a penalty in his first vault when he missed his footing and had a misstep narrowly costing him a podium finish.

Men

Athlete	Event	Qualification								Final							
Athlete	Event	Apparatus						Total	Rank	Apparatus						Total	Rank
Athlete	Event	F	PH	R	V	PB	HB	Total	Rank	F	PH	R	V	PB	HB	Total	Rank
Carlos Yulo	All-around	13.566	11.833	14.000	14.712	13.466	12.300	79.931	47	did not advance							
Carlos Yulo	Vault	—N/a			14.712	—N/a		14.712	6 Q	—N/a			14.716	—N/a		14.716	4

== Judo ==
The Philippines qualified one judoka for the women's half-middleweight category (63 kg) at the Games. Kiyomi Watanabe accepted a continental berth from the Asian zone as the nation's top-ranked judoka.

Watanabe faced Cristina Cabaña of Spain in the round of 32. Watanabe went for an attack on Cabaña but momentarily lost balance. This prompted Cabaña to take advantage of the situation, executing a sumi otoshi or corner throw on Watanabe. The throw was deemed to have resulted to an ippon ending the match in less than a minute. The throw was initially judged as a waza-ari, but the referee upgraded the decision to an ippon.

Athlete	Event	Round of 32	Round of 16	Quarterfinals	Semifinals	Repechage	Final / BM	
Athlete	Event	Opposition Result	Opposition Result	Opposition Result	Opposition Result	Opposition Result	Opposition Result	Rank
Kiyomi Watanabe	Women's −63 kg	Cabaña (ESP); L 00–10	Did not advance					

== Rowing ==
For the first time since 2000, the Philippines qualified a boat in the men's single sculls for the Olympic Games. Cris Nievarez secured the fourth of five berths available at the 2021 FISA Asia & Oceania Olympic Qualification Regatta in Tokyo, Japan.

Nievarez was the first athlete from the Philippine delegation to compete in the 2020 Summer Olympics. Ahead of the opening ceremony on 23 July, Nievarez clocked 7:22.97 in Heat 5 of the men's single sculls event, qualifying for the quarterfinals. In the heat, he finished behind Damir Martin of Croatia (7:09.17) and Alexander Vyazovkin of the ROC team (7:14.95). Nievarez, ended his bid for an Olympic medal after he placed fifth among rowers in his quarterfinal heat. He advanced to the semifinal C/D to determine his final placing. He finished 23rd overall out of 32 rowers after competing in the classification final D.

According to Philippine Rowing Association president, Patrick Gregorio, Nievarez's performance was "beyond expectations". Nievarez was the first rower representing the Philippines to advance to the quarterfinals.

Athlete	Event	Heats		Repechage		Quarterfinals		Semifinals		Final	
Athlete	Event	Time	Rank	Time	Rank	Time	Rank	Time	Rank	Time	Rank
Cris Nievarez	Men's single sculls	7:22.97	3 QF	Bye		7:50.74	5 SC/D	7:26.05	5 FD	7:21.28	23

Qualification Legend: FA=Final A (medal); FB=Final B (non-medal); FC=Final C (non-medal); FD=Final D (non-medal); FE=Final E (non-medal); FF=Final F (non-medal); SA/B=Semifinals A/B; SC/D=Semifinals C/D; SE/F=Semifinals E/F; QF=Quarterfinals; R=Repechage

== Shooting ==
The Philippines granted an invitation from ISSF to send Jayson Valdez in the men's rifle shooting to the Olympics, as long as the minimum qualifying score (MQS) was fulfilled by 6 June 2021, marking the nation's return to the sport for the first time since London 2012. Valdez, competing in the men's 10 m air rifle, failed to advance to that event's final. He scored 612.6 in the qualification round, placing him as the 44th best shooter among 47 competitors.

Athlete	Event	Qualification		Final	
Athlete	Event	Points	Rank	Points	Rank
Jayson Valdez	Men's 10 m air rifle	612.6	44	Did not advance	

== Skateboarding ==
The Philippines entered one skateboarder into the Olympic tournament. Asian Games champion Margielyn Didal was automatically selected among the top 16 eligible skateboarders in the women's street based on the World Skate Olympic Rankings.

Competing in the women's street event, Didal advanced to the finals after finishing with 12.02 points. In the final, Didal finished in 7th place, having a total score of 7.52. Didal was only able to land her second trick (out of five) and reportedly had an ankle sprain. After her participation, Didal stated that she competed with an ankle injury which she sustained on her last day of training while she was in Los Angeles.

Athlete	Event	Qualification		Final	
Athlete	Event	Points	Rank	Points	Rank
Margielyn Didal	Women's street	12.02	7 Q	7.52	7

== Swimming ==
The Philippines received an invitation from FINA to send two top-ranked swimmers (one per gender) in their respective individual events to the Olympics. Luke Gebbie and Remedy Rule qualified by satisfying the Olympic Standard Time for their respective individual events. Gebbie is the Philippine national recordholder in the men's 100m freestyle while Rule is the Philippine national recordholder in the women's 100m butterfly.

Rule failed to progress to the semifinals of the women's 100 m butterfly. However, she advanced to the semifinals of the 200 m butterfly, since there were only 16 competing swimmers (with the top 16 in the heats qualifying to the semifinals). She failed to advance to the 200 m butterfly finals after placing fifteenth.

Gebbie likewise failed to advance to the semifinals of both events he competed in. While he finished first during his heat in the men's 50 m freestyle with a time of 22.84 seconds, he ultimately placed 41st of 73 participants. In the men's 100 m freestyle he clocked a time of 49.64 seconds, breaking both his personal record and the Philippine national record of 49.94 seconds, which he had set during the 2019 FINA World Championships.

Athlete	Event	Heat		Semifinal		Final	
Athlete	Event	Time	Rank	Time	Rank	Time	Rank
Luke Gebbie	Men's 50 m freestyle	22.84	41	Did not advance			
Luke Gebbie	Men's 100 m freestyle	49.64 NR	36	Did not advance			
Remedy Rule	Women's 100 m butterfly	59.68	25	Did not advance			
Remedy Rule	Women's 200 m butterfly	2:12.23	15 Q	2:12.89	15	Did not advance	

== Taekwondo ==
The Philippines entered one athlete into the taekwondo competition at the Games. Kurt Barbosa secured a spot in the men's flyweight category (58 kg) with a top two finish at the 2021 Asian Qualification Tournament in Amman, Jordan.

Barbosa was drawn to face top-ranked South Korean athlete Jang Jun, who also won gold in the 2019 World Taekwondo Championships, in the Round of 16. Barbosa lost to Jang, but he could have still played in the repechage to potentially clinch a bronze medal if the South Korean reached the final. However Jang lost to Mohamed Khalil Jendoubi of Tunisia, which ended Barbosa's Olympic campaign.

Athlete	Event	Round of 16	Quarterfinals	Semifinals	Repechage	Final / BM	
Athlete	Event	Opposition Result	Opposition Result	Opposition Result	Opposition Result	Opposition Result	Rank
Kurt Barbosa	Men's −58 kg	Jang J (KOR); L 6–26	Did not advance				

== Weightlifting ==
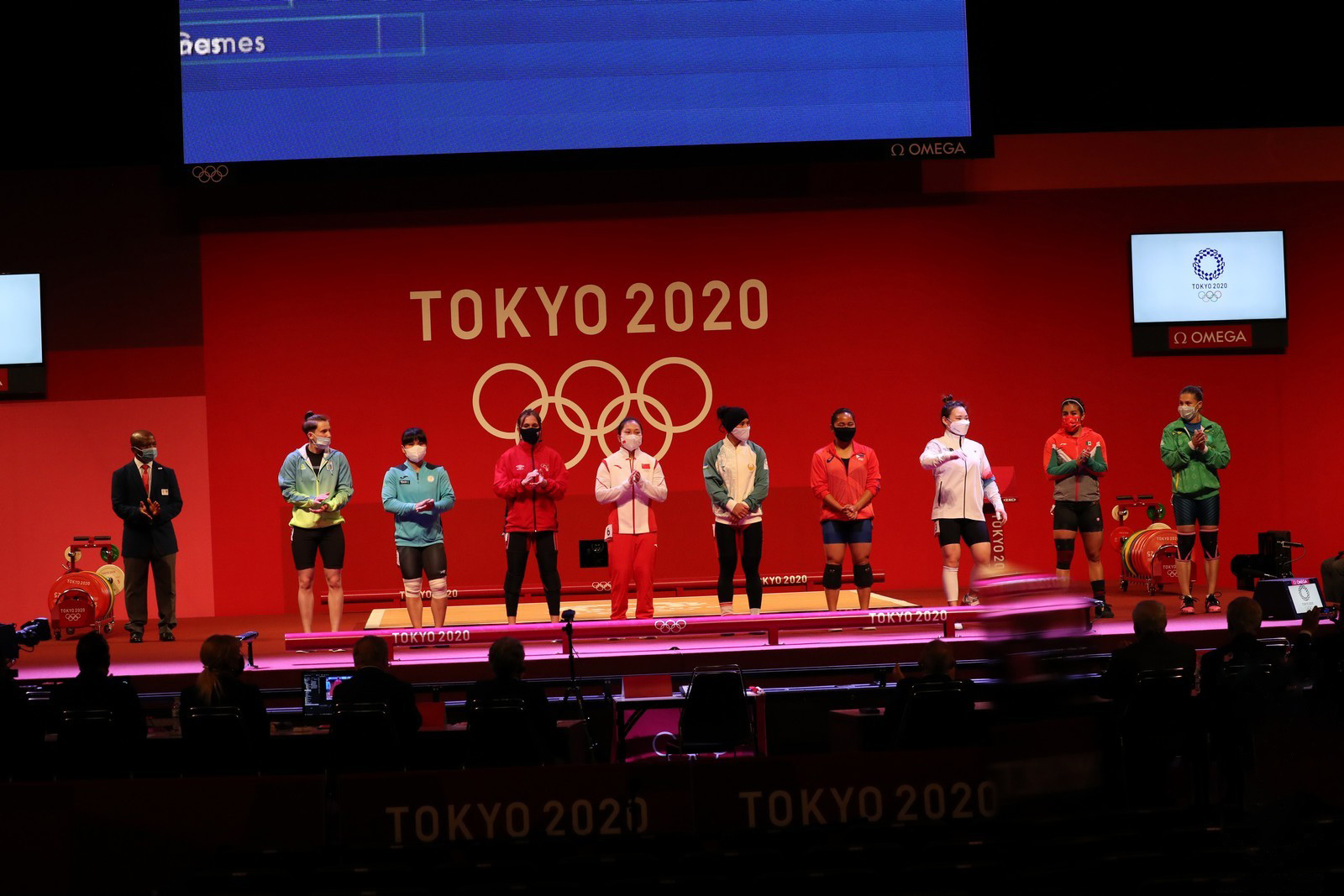
Lineup of competitors in the women's −55 kg. Hidilyn Diaz (fourth from right) represented the Philippines.

The Philippines entered two weightlifters into the Olympic competition. Rio 2016 silver medalist Hidilyn Diaz qualified second of the eight highest-ranked weightlifters in the women's 55 kg category, with rookie Elreen Ando also qualifying by virtue of heading the rankings of weightlifters from the Asian zone in the women's 64 kg category.

Diaz was supported by Jeaneth Aro (sports nutritionist), Karen Trinidad (sports psychologist), Gao Kaiwen (head coach; from China), and Julius Naranjo (strength and conditioning mentor).

She had been separated from her family since December 2019. In February 2020, Diaz went to Malaysia as part of her preparations for the Olympic Games, per the direction of coach Gao. However, she became stranded in the country due to COVID-19 pandemic-related travel restrictions. Her training in Malaysia was also disrupted by the movement control order imposed in the country, which affected the availability of gyms.

Diaz, competing in the women's −55 kg, won the first-ever gold medal for the Philippines. She lifted 97 kg in the snatch and 127 kg in the clean and jerk for a total of 224 kg, bettering Liao Qiuyun of China by a single kilo. Her score in the clean and jerk and her overall total score established new Olympic records. It was also the first time Diaz was ever to perform a 127 kg lift in the clean and jerk; she had only been able to successfully lift 125 kg while she was training.

Diaz is the first Filipino competitor to win two consecutive Olympic medals since Teófilo Yldefonso in 1928 and 1932.

Elreen Ando, for her part, finished 7th in her event, but managed to set new Philippine national records in the snatch, clean and jerk, and total in her weight class.

Athlete	Event	Snatch		Clean & Jerk		Total	Rank
Athlete	Event	Result	Rank	Result	Rank	Total	Rank
Hidilyn Diaz	Women's −55 kg	97	2	127 OR	1	224 OR	1st place, gold medalist(s)
Elreen Ando	Women's −64 kg	100 NR	9	122 NR	8	222 NR	7

== See also ==
- Philippines at the 2020 Summer Paralympics
