= Christian Tio =

Filipino kiteboarder (born 2001)

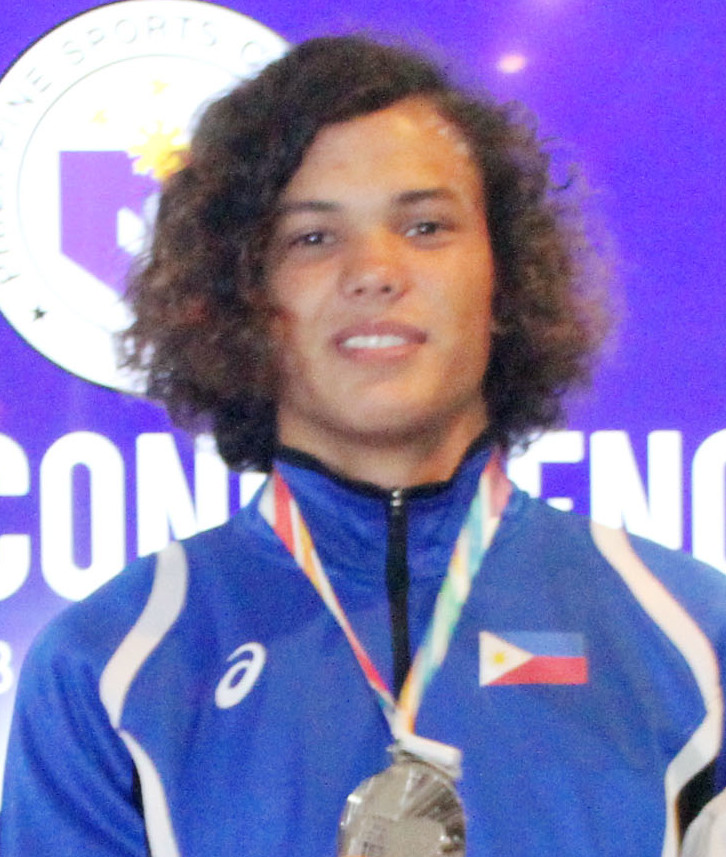
- Tio in 2018

Personal information
- National team: Philippines
- Born: March 21, 2001 (age 25)
- Height: 180 cm (5 ft 11 in)
- Weight: 72 kg (159 lb)

Sport
- Country: Philippines
- Sport: Kiteboarding
- Event: IKA Twin Tip Racing
- Coached by: Chris Mohn (until 2016); Fabio Ingrosso
Medal record
Representing the Philippines
Youth Olympic Games
Silver medal – second place	2018 Buenos Aires	IKA Twin Tip Racing

Christian Tio (born 21 March 2001) is a Filipino kiteboarder who has won the first medal for the Philippines in the Summer Youth Olympics.

== Early life and education ==
Christian Tio is born on March 21, 2001 to Chris Mohn, a Norwegian father and Liezl Tio, a Filipino mother who is a native of Aklan.

== Career ==
Both of Christian Tio's parents were professional kiteboarders who influenced him to take up the sport at age 7. He developed his skills in his native Boracay and trained under his father until February 2016; his father's death. He was later mentored by Fabio Ingrosso of Srilankakite, a kiteboarding school in Sri Lanka.

He has competed and won multiple times at the Kiteboarding Youth Cup competing in the U19 (under-19) category at age 15 in the 2016 edition where he won third place. In the previous iterations he competed in the U17 category.

=== 2018 Summer Youth Olympics ===
Christian Tio was the second Filipino athlete to qualify for the 2018 Summer Youth Olympics in Buenos Aires, Argentina. He clinched the sole berth contested for the boy's twin tip racing event at the Asian qualifiers in Pranburi, Thailand on March 18, 2018.

Boracay's closure from April to October 2018 affected Tio's training for the Youth Olympics and had to train elsewhere. Tio participated at a competition in Italy and the Philippine Kiteboarding Association also sent him in Norway and the Dominican Republic for further training. While in the Philippines, Tio trained in Lake Caliraya in Laguna.

Tio competed in the IKA Twin Tip Racing event at the Club Nautico San Isidro. Several of the races where cancelled but Tio was able to secure a silver medal. Deury Corniel of Dominican Republic won the gold medal while Toni Vodisek of Slovenia also won a silver medal. Tio's medal was the first medal of any color credited to the Philippines at the Summer Youth Olympic Games.
