= Julius Naranjo =

Guamanian weightlifter (born 1991)

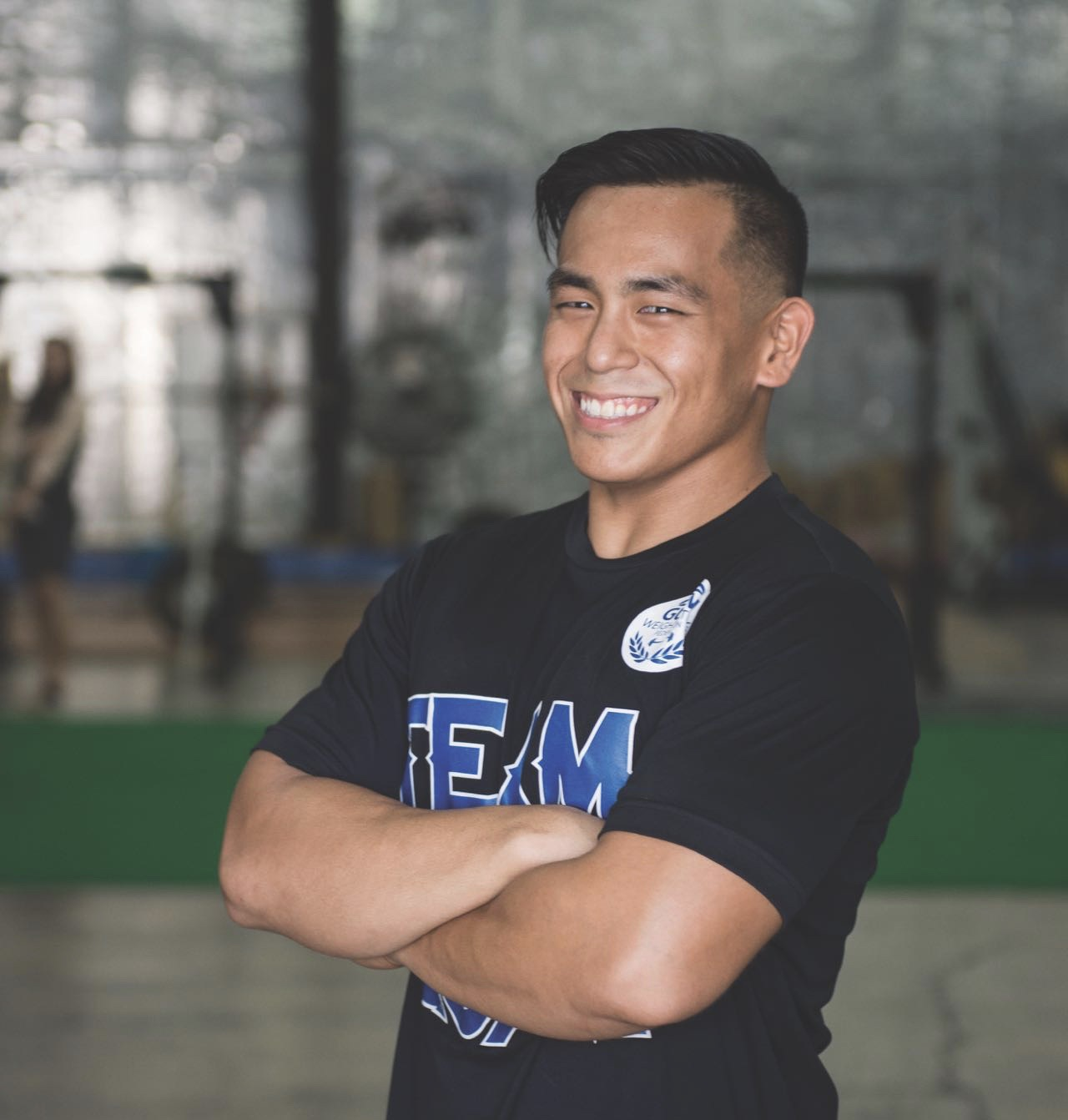

Personal information
- Full name: Julius Irvin Hikaru Takamura Naranjo
- Citizenship: American / Filipino
- Born: June 14, 1991 (age 35) Tamuning, Guam, U.S.
- Education: Father Duenas Memorial School
- Occupations: Weightlifter, coach, filmmaker
- Spouse: Hidilyn Diaz (m. 2022)

Sport
- Country: Guam
- Sport: Weightlifting
- Now coaching: Hidilyn Diaz

Julius Irvin Hikaru Takamura Naranjo (Tagalog pronunciation: [naˈɾanho]; born June 14, 1991) is a Guamanian weightlifter, coach, and filmmaker. He competed for Guam in the 2017 Asian Indoor and Martial Arts Games and coaches Filipino Olympic weightlifter (and his wife) Hidilyn Diaz.

== Early life and education ==
Julius Irvin Hikaru Takamura Naranjo is the eldest son of a Filipino father and Japanese mother and has 3 younger siblings.

Naranjo had earned his Bachelor of Sciences in Exercise Science & Health Promotions with a minor in Nutrition at the University of Guam in 2013.

== Weightlifting career ==
Naranjo had represented Guam's National Weightlifting Team and is a record holder in the old 69 kg weight category. He had represented Guam at the 2017 Asian Indoor and Martial Arts Games in Ashgabat, Turkmenistan competing in the 62 kg weight category. A career-ending back injury forced Naranjo's retirement.

== Coaching career ==
After retiring from competitive weightlifting, Naranjo turned to coaching. During his athletic career, Naranjo was also managing a functional fitness facility and physical therapy clinic, where he had coached classes and did strength & conditioning for various clients including students and Guam national athletes.

Naranjo as of 2020, is currently a weightlifting coach, strength & conditioning coach, and team manager for Team HD, the Olympic Core team for Hidilyn Diaz who competed in the 2020 Summer Olympics in Tokyo, which was later postponed to July 2021.

Naranjo and Hidilyn Diaz, along with their head coach Kaiwen Gao have been training in Malaysia as lockdowns and the current situation of COVID-19 around the world have created a difficult situations for all Olympic Bound athletes.

Naranjo also does remote coaching for weightlifting athletes and has built a good following from his coaching and weightlifting videos with more than 20,000 followers on his Instagram.

== Filmmaking career ==
Aside from being a coach, Naranjo is also a filmmaker who co-founded the Collective Culture and also promotes the sport of weightlifting on Instagram and Facebook.

Naranjo had worked for just over a year as a production artist and had been a director of photography for a number of productions with Docomo Pacific, a telecommunications company based in Guam.

Naranjo and Hidilyn Diaz have collaborated through Collective Culture to help spread her awareness advocacy of weightlifting by creating documentaries such as Move to Inspire and Lifters for Lifters.

Naranjo collaborated with Malaysian/Filipino singer Yazmin Aziz as a filmmaker for her news segment on TFC News Asia and aiding with a number of projects for her music.

== Personal life ==
Naranjo married his fiancée and the Philippines' first Olympic gold medalist, weightlifter Hidilyn Diaz, in a ceremony held at St. Ignatius Church in the Philippine Military Academy grounds, Baguio, Philippines, on July 26, 2022, exactly a year after the latter's historic gold medal win in the 2020 Summer Olympics.

Then engaged, both had been featured together in various Philippine television programs. This includes an episode of Kapuso Mo, Jessica Soho in GMA where their romantic relationship was featured. They were also featured on Sports U and Magandang Buhay of ABS-CBN.

Naranjo is also Diaz's assistant weightlifting strength and conditioning coach helping the latter secure the Philippines' first-ever Olympic gold medal in the 2020 Summer Olympics in Tokyo.
