= Liao Qiuyun =

Chinese weightlifter (born 1995)

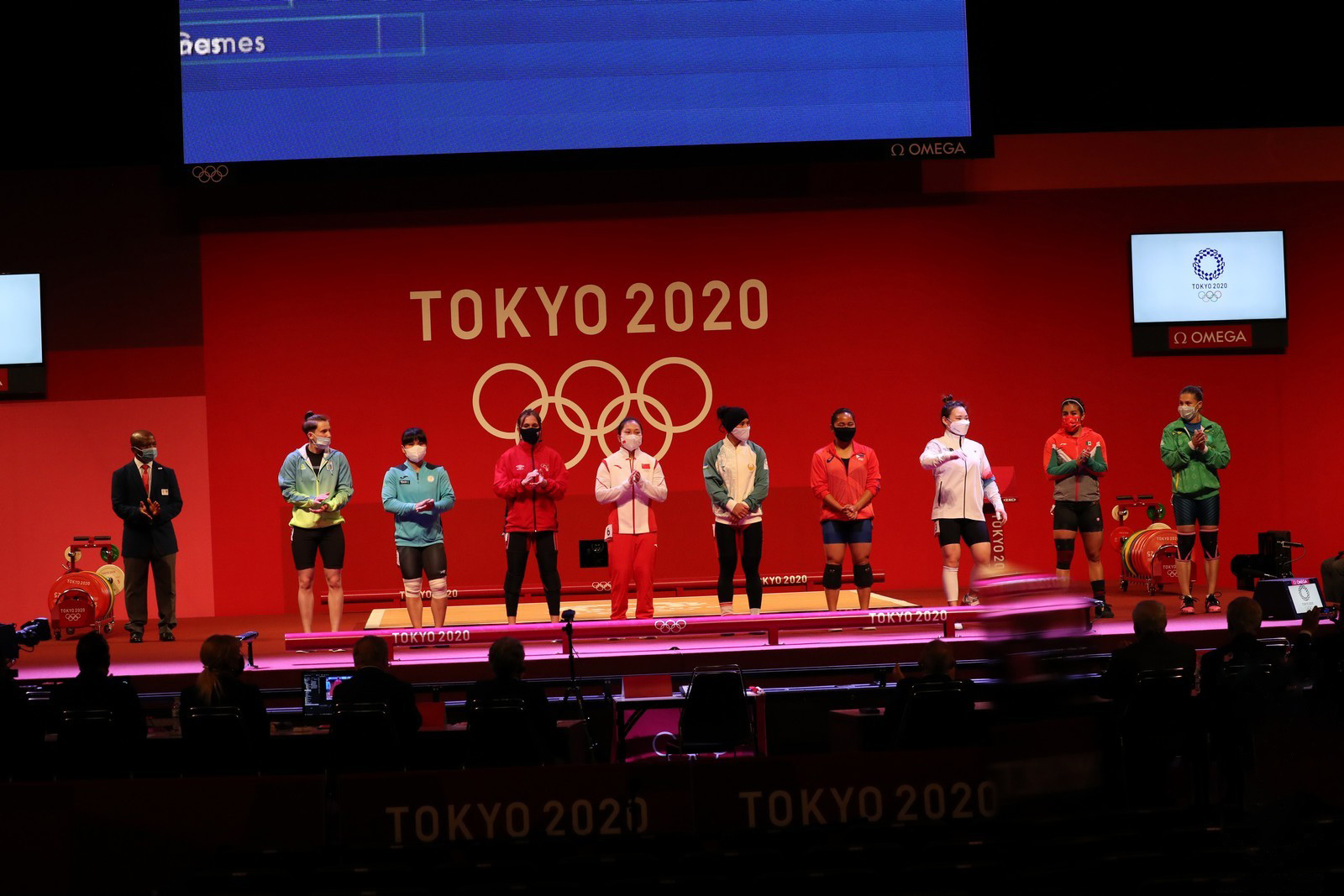
- Liao (4th from left) in the athletes' presentation in women's 55kg in Tokyo.

Personal information
- Nationality: Chinese
- Born: 13 July 1995 (age 31) Yongzhou, China
- Height: 1.52 m (5 ft 0 in)
- Weight: 54.80 kg (121 lb)

Sport
- Country: China
- Sport: Weightlifting
- Event: 55 kg
Medal record
Representing China
Olympic Games
Silver medal – second place	2020 Tokyo	55 kg
World Championships
Gold medal – first place	2019 Pattaya	–55 kg
Asian Championships
Gold medal – first place	2019 Ningbo	–55 kg
Gold medal – first place	2020 Tashkent	–55 kg
Asian Indoor and Martial Arts Games
Gold medal – first place	2017 Ashgabat	–53 kg
National Games of China
Gold medal – first place	2017 Tianjin	–53 kg

Liao Qiuyun (Chinese: 廖秋云, born 13 July 1995) is a Chinese weightlifter. She is the silver medalist at the 2020 Summer Olympics in Tokyo and World and Asian Champion. She competes in the women's 55 kg division.

== Career ==
In early 2019 Liao competed at the 2019 IWF World Cup in the 55 kg division and won gold medals in all lifts. Later in 2019 she competed at the 2019 Asian Weightlifting Championships in the 55 kg category, won gold medals in all lifts, and set a world record in the clean & jerk with a lift of 128 kg. She outlifted silver medalist Hidilyn Diaz by 15 kg. In 2021 at the 2020 Summer Olympics, she won China a silver medal in women's 55 kg weightlifting.

== Major results ==
Year	Venue	Weight	Snatch (kg)				Clean & Jerk (kg)				Total	Rank
Year	Venue	Weight	1	2	3	Rank	1	2	3	Rank	Total	Rank
Representing China
Olympic Games
2021	Tokyo, Japan	55 kg	92	95	97	2	118	123	126	2	223	2nd place, silver medalist(s)
World Championships
2019	Pattaya, Thailand	55 kg	~~95~~	95	98	2nd place, silver medalist(s)	120	125	129 WR	1st place, gold medalist(s)	227 WR	1st place, gold medalist(s)
Asian Championships
2019	Ningbo, China	55 kg	93	~~96~~	96	1st place, gold medalist(s)	118	122	128 WR	1st place, gold medalist(s)	224	1st place, gold medalist(s)
IWF World Cup
2019	Fuzhou, China	55 kg	93	96	~~98~~	2nd place, silver medalist(s)	118	121	125	1st place, gold medalist(s)	221	1st place, gold medalist(s)
