= Hidilyn Diaz =

Filipino weightlifter (born 1991)

Hidilyn Diaz OLY
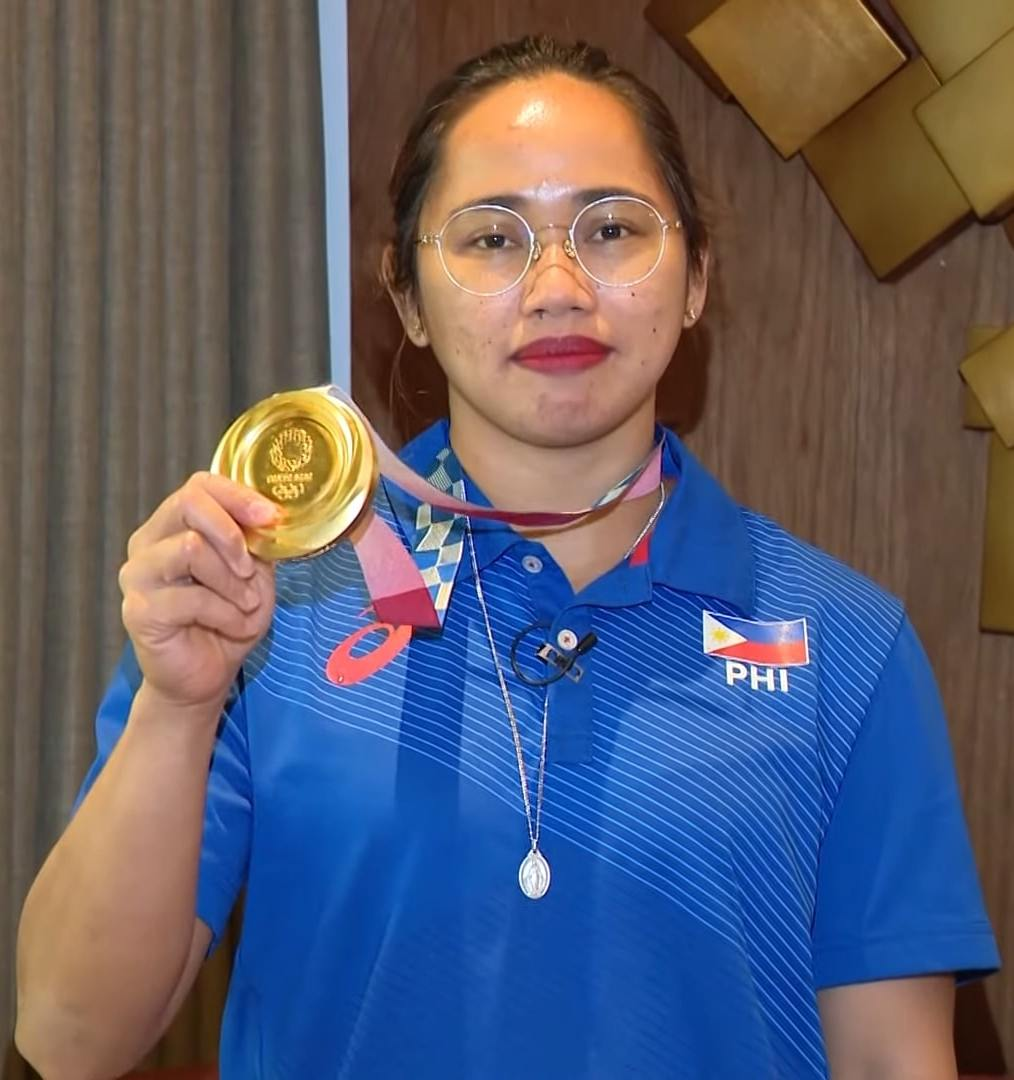
- Diaz in 2021
- Born: Hidilyn Francisco Diaz; February 20, 1991 (age 35); Zamboanga City, Philippines
- Education: De La Salle–College of Saint Benilde (BBA); Universidad de Zamboanga
- Occupations: Professional weightlifter, Educator
- Spouse: Julius Naranjo (m. 2022)
- Sports career
- Height: 1.58 m (5 ft 2 in)
- Weight: 58.65 kg (129 lb)
- Country: Philippines
- Sport: Weightlifting
- Events: –59 kg, –55 kg
- Club: Zamboanga
- Coached by: Gao Kaiwen (Weightlifting Coach); Julius Naranjo (Weightlifting/Strength and Conditioning Coach) Catalino Diaz (First Coach); Antonio Agustin Jr. (Former Coach)

Sports achievements and titles
- Personal bests: Snatch: 102 kg (2013, NR); Clean & Jerk: 127 kg (2021, OR); Total: 224 kg (2021, OR)
Medal record
Women's weightlifting
Representing the Philippines
| Event | 1st | 2nd | 3rd |
|---|---|---|---|
| Summer Olympics | 1 | 1 | 0 |
| World Championships | 1 | 0 | 3 |
| Asian Games | 1 | 0 | 0 |
| Asian Championships | 1 | 1 | 1 |
| Asian Indoor and Martial Arts Games | 0 | 1 | 0 |
| Southeast Asian Games | 2 | 2 | 1 |
| Total | 6 | 5 | 5 |
Olympic Games
| Gold medal – first place | 2020 Tokyo | –55 kg |
| Silver medal – second place | 2016 Rio de Janeiro | –53 kg |
World Championships
| Gold medal – first place | 2022 Bogotá | –55 kg |
| Bronze medal – third place | 2015 Houston | –53 kg |
| Bronze medal – third place | 2017 Anaheim | –53 kg |
| Bronze medal – third place | 2019 Pattaya | –55 kg |
Asian Games
| Gold medal – first place | 2018 Jakarta–Palembang | –53 kg |
Asian Championships
| Gold medal – first place | 2015 Phuket | –53 kg |
| Silver medal – second place | 2019 Ningbo | –55 kg |
| Bronze medal – third place | 2016 Tashkent | –53 kg |
Asian Indoor and Martial Arts Games
| Silver medal – second place | 2017 Ashgabat | –53 kg |
Southeast Asian Games
| Gold medal – first place | 2019 Philippines | –55 kg |
| Gold medal – first place | 2021 Vietnam | –55 kg |
| Silver medal – second place | 2011 Jakarta-Palembang | –58 kg |
| Silver medal – second place | 2013 Naypyidaw | –58 kg |
| Bronze medal – third place | 2007 Nakhon Ratchasima | –58 kg |
- Military career
- Allegiance: Philippines
- Branch: Philippine Air Force
- Service years: 2013–present
- Rank: Second Lieutenant
- Units: Air Force Special Service Group, PAF Personnel Management Center, 710th Special Operations Wing, Philippine Air Force Civil-Military Operations Group
- Awards: Military Merit Medal; Presidential Citation Unit Badge

Hidilyn Francisco Diaz-Naranjo (Tagalog: [haɪdiˈlin ˈdias naˈɾanho]; born February 20, 1991) is a Filipino weightlifter, educator, and airwoman. The first Filipino to win an Olympic gold medal, she holds two Olympic records in weightlifting for her performance at the women's 55 kg category for weightlifting at the 2020 Summer Olympics.

In her early weightlifting years, she was a bronze medalist in the 2007 SEA Games in Thailand and achieved 10th place at the 2006 Asian Games in the 53-kilogram class. While she was a student and representing Universidad de Zamboanga, she won two golds and one silver in the Asian Youth/Junior Weightlifting Championship held in Jeonju, South Korea. She competed in the 2008 Summer Olympics, where she was the youngest competitor in the women's 58-kg category.

In the 2016 Summer Olympics, Diaz won the silver medal in the women's 53-kg weight division, the first Filipino to win a medal in a non-boxing event since 1936 and ending the Philippines' 20-year Olympic medal drought. At the 2020 Summer Olympics, Diaz became the country's first Olympic gold medalist. She also set Olympic records for the 55 kg division in the clean and jerk at 127 kg and in the total at 224 kg.

== Early life and education ==
Hidilyn Francisco Diaz is the fifth of six children of Eduardo and Emelita (née Francisco) Diaz. Her father was a tricycle driver before becoming a farmer and a fisherman. She grew up wanting to be a banker and trying several sports, like basketball and volleyball. Her cousin, Allen Jayfrus Diaz, taught her the basics of weightlifting.

Diaz attended the Zamboanga A.E. Colleges (later Universidad de Zamboanga; UZ) for her high school studies under a scholarship. In college, she pursued a bachelor's degree in computer science at the same school. She then stopped attending the university as a third year irregular student as she found her degree unsuitable for her. She also claimed that it distracted her training. After her success in the 2016 Olympics, Diaz decided to continue her tertiary education and intended to pursue a degree related to sports in Manila.

In January 2017, Diaz received a scholarship to study business management at De La Salle-College of Saint Benilde.

In 2019, Diaz took a leave of absence from her schooling while she focused on preparation for the Olympics after winning the Asian Games. In 2020, Diaz re-enrolled into online classes because the 2020 Summer Olympics were postponed to July 2021 due to the COVID-19 pandemic.

In July 2023, Diaz graduated from Saint Benilde and earned her business management degree.

In October 2024, Diaz enrolled in a short course, the Athlete Career Transition Sports Ethics and Integrity at KU Leuven in partnership with the International Olympic Committee Solidarity in Belgium.

In 2025 she completed a culinary course while continuing to manage her weightlifting academy.

== Competitive career ==
First learning weightlifting from her older cousins, Diaz initially lifted using makeshift barbells made of mag wheels or concrete. Prior to high school, Diaz joined the University of Zamboanga's (UZ) extension program to train in weightlifting under her cousin Catalino Diaz who was also her first coach. Elementary students not enrolled in UZ were able to train under the program of Institute of Human Kinetics director Elbert Atilano. She had to do part-time work to fund her transportation to a local gymnasium. Her part-time jobs were selling vegetables and fish and washing jeepneys. Diaz's first competition was the 2002 Batang Pinoy in Puerto Princesa. She went on to compete in various local and national competitions and secured support from the local government. Diaz became part of the Philippine national weightlifting team at age 13.

=== 2008 Summer Olympics ===
Diaz was selected as a wild card entry to the Beijing Olympics by the Philippine Weightlifting Association in early 2008. This made her the first female weightlifter to compete for the Philippines in the Olympics, and the sixth weightlifter overall (the first being Rodrigo del Rosario competing in 1948 London Olympics). Competing in the women's 58-kg class, 17-year-old Diaz lifted 85-kg in the snatch and 107-kg in the clean and jerk for a 192-kg total, breaking the Philippine record that she herself set at the 2007 Southeast Asian Games. Although she placed second to last in a field of 12 weightlifters, her performance was praised and considered promising for her age. Philippine Sports Commission Chairman William Ramirez once commented that she competed there to gain valuable experience and predicted that she would be a strong contender in future competitions.

=== 2012 Summer Olympics ===
Diaz became the first Filipina weightlifter to compete in two consecutive Olympics, by qualifying in the women's weightlifting under 58 kg through the Continental and World Qualifying Tournaments. She was ranked ninth in her event heading to the Olympics. During the 2012 London Olympics, Diaz was chosen to be the flagbearer during the Opening Ceremony.

She was coached by Tony Agustin, and they projected a 225 kg lift, above her personal best of 219 kg. She successfully lifted a personal best of 97 kg in the snatch, 12th best among the 19 competitors. However her 118 kg clean and jerk was unsuccessful after three attempts. She was one of two competitors (along with Lina Rivas of Colombia) to end with an official result of "Did not finish" (DNF) in the event.

=== 2015 to 2016 season ===
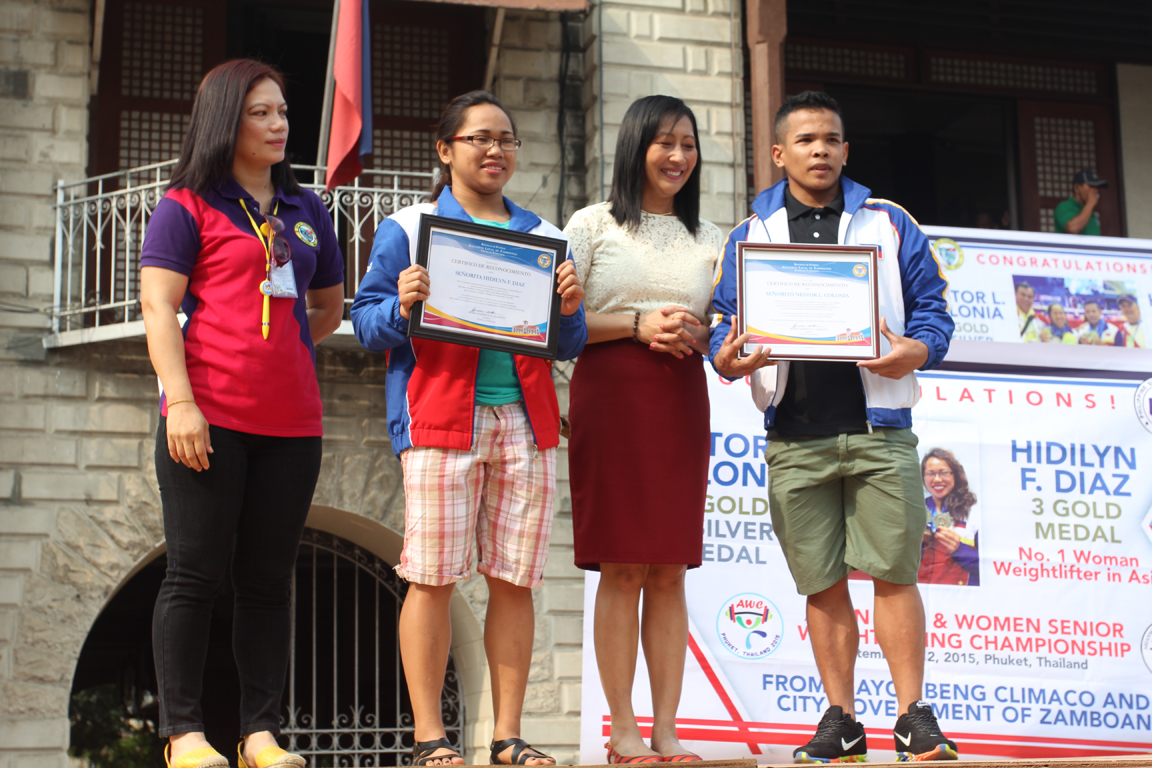
Diaz (second from left) with Cecil Atilano, Beng Climaco and Nestor Colonia being recognized by Zamboanga City Mayor Mayor Beng Climaco for their performance in the 2015 Asian Weightlifting Championships in Phuket, Thailand

Diaz weighed around 56.28 kg during her first Olympic campaign, making her the lightest among competitors. Come the 2012 Olympics, she had increased her weight to 57.70 kg but still struggled making it to the top half of the competition. Trying to improve her chances of landing a podium finish at the 2016 Rio Olympics, Diaz decided to drop weight from under 58 kg to under 53 kg. This proved to be effective as she won the gold medal in the 1st Southeast Asian Weightlifting Championship in Bangkok. In that competition, she managed to lift a 98 kg snatch and a 115 kg clean and jerk for a 213 kg total. The same mark was also good for 4th place later on in the 2012 London Olympics.

In the Asian Weightlifting Championships, Diaz won both a gold medal in 2015 and a bronze medal in 2016. She also earned three bronze medals for the clean, jerk and snatch events in the 53 kg division of the IWF World Weightlifting Championship held in Houston, Texas, on November 22, 2015, to claim a spot in the 2016 Rio Olympics.

In March 2016, Diaz dominated the women's 58 kg event of the 2015-16 Philippine National Games National Finals held at Lingayen Town Plaza, Lingayen, Pangasinan, with a 92 kg snatch and 120 kg clean and jerk (new personal best) combined into 212 kg.

=== 2016 Summer Olympics ===
In the 2016 Summer Olympics in Rio de Janeiro, Diaz competed in her 3rd consecutive Olympics in the women's 53kg weightlifting category with the intention of at least winning a bronze medal. Diaz surpassed her own personal target and won the silver medal at the event, after successfully clinching a lift of 88 kg in her second attempt in snatch event (placed 6th) and 111 kg and 112 kg in the first and second attempts in the clean and jerk event (placed 2nd). This was the first medal for the Philippines in the Summer Olympics after 20 years. This was also the first non-boxing medal for the nation since 1936. Aside from being the first Filipina weightlifter to compete in three consecutive Olympics, she also became the first Filipino woman and the second person from Zamboanga and Mindanao to win an Olympic medal (after Simeon Toribio, bronze medal winner of men's high jump in the 1932 Los Angeles Olympic Games).

On August 8, 2016, she returned to her hometown, Zamboanga City and was welcomed as a hero of the city. From receiving numerous incentives from the Philippine president, Philippine Sports Commission and her local city, she was able to buy land for her sibling and for her gym.

=== 2018 Asian Games ===
Diaz participated in the women's 53 kg event in the 2018 Asian Games in Jakarta, Indonesia. Two months prior to the Asian Games, she recruited Gao Kaowen who was previously coach of the Chinese national women's army team. In the women's 53 kg in the 2018 Asian Games, Diaz had a total lift of 207 kg, beating Turkmenistan's Kristina Shermetova (206 kg) and Thailand's Surodchana Khambao (201 kg) to deliver the Philippines' first gold in the 2018 games, as well as being the first Filipino weightlifter of any gender to win a gold medal in the Asian Games.

=== 2019–20 season ===
After winning a bronze in the 2017 World Championships, Diaz again won a bronze in the 2019 edition of the same event. She also won a silver in the 2019 Asian Championship, and another gold in the 2019 Southeast Asian Games in Manila. In January 2020, Diaz won the gold medal in the women's 55 kg event at the Roma 2020 World Cup in Rome, Italy.

=== 2020 Summer Olympics ===
On July 26, 2021, Diaz won a gold medal at the 2020 Summer Olympics in Tokyo. This was the first ever gold medal won by a Filipino athlete since the country's first appearance in the Olympics in 1924. She set new Olympic weightlifting records by lifting 127 kg in the clean and jerk and lifting a total weight of 224 kg.

Diaz's achievements at the 2020 Summer Olympics were impressive, as she was previously stranded in Malaysia from February 2020 until July 2021, due to travel restrictions imposed by governments to contain the COVID-19 pandemic. Based on guidance by her coach, Gao Kaiwen, Diaz initially went to train in Malaysia in February 2020 because Gao thought it would be better for her as she focused on qualifying for Tokyo. However, once Malaysia implemented its Movement Control Order in April 2020, which closed gyms within the capital region of Kuala Lumpur (Klang Valley), she improvised by using bamboo sticks and large water bottles as makeshift weightlifting equipment. In October 2020, she relocated to the southern coastal state of Malacca where they had been living in a house owned by a Malaysian weightlifting official in Jasin. The Malaysian government then implemented periodic restrictions on gyms and sporting activities within 2021 (to reduce social interaction and contain the spread of the coronavirus), forcing her to work out in the house's sweltering open-air carport in the immediate months prior to the 2020 Summer Olympics.

Diaz also struggled with her mental health during this ordeal, especially with the postponement of the 2020 Olympics, and credited her team, including sports psychologist Dr. Karen Katrina Trinidad and Project: Steady with trauma therapist Gang Badoy Capati for her well-being. She also kept busy during her training overseas during COVID-19 lockdown by cooking, attending meetings, and studying.

In recognition of winning the first gold medal for the Philippines at any Olympic Games, she was awarded PHP 35.5 million (approximately US$660,000) along with a house and a lot. The financial and asset awards, were jointly given by both the national government and tycoons from the private sector. Under Philippine law, the Philippine Sports Commission guarantees a 10 million-peso incentive for every Olympic gold medal per Republic Act 10699.

=== 2022–23 season ===
On May 20, 2022, Diaz won her second gold medal win during the 31st Southeast Asian Games. In December of that year, she won the gold medal in the women's 55 kg event at the World Weightlifting Championships held in Bogotá, Colombia. In that same month, she was also elected as member of the IWF Athletes' Commission.

Diaz would move up to the -59 kg weight class after the -53 kg and -55 kg classes were not included in the weightlifting program for the 2024 Summer Olympics in Paris.

She made her competitive debut in the 59 kg division at the 2023 Asian Weightlifting Championships in South Korea. She placed 4th by lifting a total of 221 kg.

=== Hiatus in 2024 and return in 2025 ===
Diaz failed to qualify for the 2024 Summer Olympics in Paris after failing to finish among the top ten in the IWF Olympic Qualification Ranking and was beaten by fellow Filipino Elreen Ando in the 59 kg class following the conclusion of the IWF World Cup in Thailand. In December 2024, Diaz has considered attempting to qualify for the 2028 Summer Olympics in Los Angeles.

Diaz juggled training and coaching other weightlifters while preparing for her competitive return through the 2025 SEA Games in Thailand. She placed fourth in the 58 kg class and missed the podium stating that mental preparation was her biggest issue. Despite the results, Diaz stated she is not yet retiring.

In the women's 58th kg event at the 33rd SEA Games in Chonburi, Thailand on 14 of December 2025, Diaz lifted 90 kg in the snatch and 110 kg in the clean and jerk for a total of 200 kg, finishing fourth behind Thailand (gold), Indonesia (silver), and Vietname (bronze). She described the challenge as primarily mental after nearly two years away from competition and stated, "This is my best for now" and "I'm definitely not retiring, but I'm almost there." Diaz indicated she would target the 61 kg class and Olympic qualifiers in 2026 with the goal of competing at the 2028 Los Angeles Games.

=== Major results ===
| Year | Venue | Weight | Snatch (kg) | | | | Clean & Jerk (kg) | | | | Total | Rank |
| Year | Venue | Weight | 1 | 2 | 3 | Rank | 1 | 2 | 3 | Rank | Total | Rank |
Olympic Games
| 2008 | Beijing, China | 58 kg | 80 | 85 | ~~90~~ | 11 | ~~102~~ | 102 | 107 | 11 | 192 | 11 |
| 2012 | (United Kingdom) London, Great Britain | 58 kg | 92 | ~~97~~ | 97 | 13 | ~~118~~ | ~~118~~ | ~~118~~ | — | — | — |
| 2016 | Rio de Janeiro, Brazil | 53 kg | ~~88~~ | 88 | ~~91~~ | 5 | 111 | 112 | ~~117~~ | 2 | 200 | 2nd place, silver medalist(s) |
| 2021 | Tokyo, Japan | 55 kg | 94 | 97 | ~~99~~ | 2 | 119 | 124 | 127; OR | 1 | 224; OR | 1st place, gold medalist(s) |
World Championships
| 2011 | Paris, France | 58 kg | 92 | ~~95~~ | 95 | 9 | 119 | ~~121~~ | ~~123~~ | 7 | 214 | 7 |
| 2015 | Houston, United States | 53 kg | 94 | 96 | ~~100~~ | 3rd place, bronze medalist(s) | 115 | 117 | ~~121~~ | 3rd place, bronze medalist(s) | 213 | 3rd place, bronze medalist(s) |
| 2017 | Anaheim, United States | 53 kg | ~~85~~ | 86 | ~~90~~ | 5 | 110 | 113 | ~~115~~ | 2nd place, silver medalist(s) | 199 | 3rd place, bronze medalist(s) |
| 2018 | Ashgabat, Turkmenistan | 55 kg | 88 | 91 | 93 | 6 | 110 | ~~115~~ | ~~115~~ | 13 | 203 | 9 |
| 2019 | Pattaya, Thailand | 55 kg | ~~93~~ | ~~93~~ | 93 | 8 | 115 | 118 | 121 | 3rd place, bronze medalist(s) | 214 | 3rd place, bronze medalist(s) |
| 2022 | Bogotá, Colombia | 55 kg | 90 | 93 | ~~96~~ | 1st place, gold medalist(s) | 114 | ~~117~~ | ~~121~~ | 1st place, gold medalist(s) | 207 | 1st place, gold medalist(s) |
| 2023 | Riyadh, Saudi Arabia | 59 kg | ~~95~~ | 95 | 97 | 11 | 121 | 125 | 127 | 6 | 224 | 7 |
Asian Games
| 2006 | Doha, Qatar | 53 kg | 67 | 70 | 72 | 11 | 82 | 88 | 90 | 10 | 162 | 10 |
| 2010 | Guangzhou, China | 58 kg | 90 | 94 | ~~97~~ | 6 | 111 | ~~115~~ | 115 | 8 | 209 | 6 |
| 2018 | Jakarta, Indonesia | 53 kg | 88 | 90 | 92 | 2 | 110 | 115 | ~~117~~ | 1 | 207 | 1st place, gold medalist(s) |
| 2023 | Hangzhou, China | 59 kg | 94 | 97 | ~~100~~ | 4 | 121 | 126 | ~~131~~ | 3 | 223 | 4 |
Asian Championships
| 2012 | Pyeongtaek, South Korea | 58 kg | 90 | 95 | ~~98~~ | 4 | 118 | ~~122~~ | 122 | 4 | 217 | 4 |
| 2015 | Phuket, Thailand | 53 kg | ~~93~~ | 93 | 96 | 1st place, gold medalist(s) | 112 | 116 | 118 | 1st place, gold medalist(s) | 214 | 1st place, gold medalist(s) |
| 2016 | Tashkent, Uzbekistan | 53 kg | ~~90~~ | 90 | ~~95~~ | 3rd place, bronze medalist(s) | 112 | 115 | 118 | 2nd place, silver medalist(s) | 208 | 3rd place, bronze medalist(s) |
| 2019 | Ningbo, China | 55 kg | 90 | 94 | ~~96~~ | 2nd place, silver medalist(s) | 110 | 115 | ~~119~~ | 2nd place, silver medalist(s) | 209 | 2nd place, silver medalist(s) |
| 2021 | Tashkent, Uzbekistan | 55 kg | ~~90~~ | 90 | 94 | 4 | 118 | ~~121~~ | ~~122~~ | 4 | 212 | 4 |
| 2023 | Jinju, South Korea | 59 kg | 93 | 97 | 99 | 4 | 118 | 122 | ~~125~~ | 5 | 221 | 4 |
IWF World Cup
| 2020 | Rome, Italy | 55 kg | 90 | 93 | ~~95~~ | 1st place, gold medalist(s) | 113 | 119 | ~~122~~ | 1st place, gold medalist(s) | 212 | 1st place, gold medalist(s) |
Asian Indoor and Martial Arts Games
| 2017 | Ashgabat, Turkmenistan | 53 kg | 85 | 90 | ~~93~~ | 2 | 110 | ~~114~~ | 114 | 2 | 204 | 2nd place, silver medalist(s) |
Junior World Championships
| 2011 | Penang, Malaysia | 58 kg | 90 | 93 | ~~94~~ | 3rd place, bronze medalist(s) | 115 | 120 | ~~122~~ | 5 | 213 | 4 |
Asian Junior Championships
| 2009 | Dubai, United Arab Emirates | 58 kg | ~~85~~ | 85 | 88 | 1st place, gold medalist(s) | 100 | ~~108~~ | ~~108~~ | 5 | 188 | 3rd place, bronze medalist(s) |
| 2010 | Tashkent, Uzbekistan | 58 kg | ~~83~~ | 83 | 84 | 2nd place, silver medalist(s) | 102 | 107 | 111 | 2nd place, silver medalist(s) | 195 | 2nd place, silver medalist(s) |
| 2011 | Pattaya, Thailand | 58 kg | 90 | 93 | 95 | 1st place, gold medalist(s) | 115 | ~~120~~ | 120 | 2nd place, silver medalist(s) | 215 | 1st place, gold medalist(s) |

== Military career ==
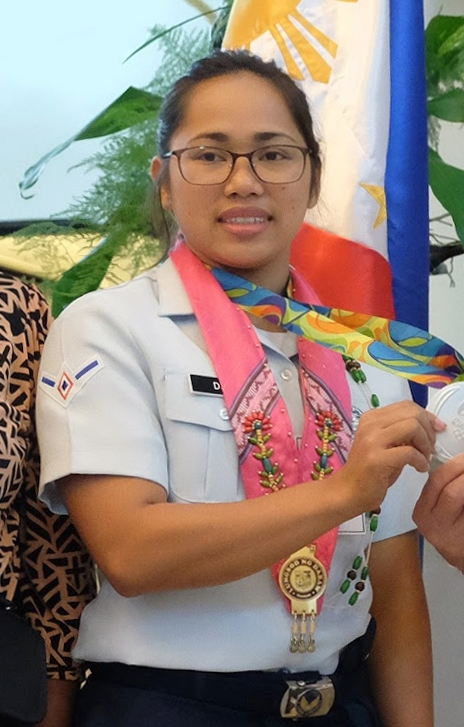
Diaz in Philippine Air Force uniform with her Olympic silver medal in 2016.

Diaz was recruited into the Philippine Air Force (PAF) through the military arm's Direct Enlistment Program in 2013. She was initially assigned to the Air Force Special Service Group. She was also given an Air Force Specialty Code skill in recreation in weightlifting. In 2014, she was given a promotion from the rank of Airwoman to Airwoman Second Class. Diaz was also a recipient of a Military Merit Medal for organizing PAF events and a Presidential Citation Unit Badge. When Diaz was training for her stint at the 2016 Summer Olympics, she was assigned to PAF Personnel Management Center on a temporary basis. For her achievement at the Olympics, she was given a promotion by the PAF. The extent of the promotion was initially not disclosed but it was later reported that Diaz was promoted to the rank of Airwoman First Class. Diaz was consecutively promoted to the rank of Sergeant after the 2018 Asian Games. On July 27, 2021, following Diaz's success in competing for the gold medal in the 2020 Tokyo Olympics, Lt. Gen. Allen Paredes, the Philippine Air Force's commanding general, approved Diaz's promotion from Sergeant, to Staff Sergeant.

== Personal life ==
Diaz is a devout Catholic and credits her faith with inspiring her athletic achievements. She wore a Miraculous Medal at the 2020 Olympic medaling ceremony, which she said is "a sign of our prayers and faith in Mama Mary and Jesus Christ."

Diaz is married to Julius Naranjo, a former weightlifter who competed for Guam in international competitions and a professional weightlifting coach, a strength and conditioning coach, and filmmaker at the 2017 Asian Indoor and Martial Arts Games. Naranjo had become her coach, and they were wed in Baguio, on July 26, 2022.

In January 2026, Diaz became part of the teaching staff of the College of Human Kinetics at the University of the Philippines Diliman, instructing physical education classes at the undergraduate level.

=== Hidilyn Diaz Weightlifting Academy ===
In July 2024, Diaz inaugurated her Hidilyn Diaz Weightlifting Academy in Jalajala, including the academy's training programs and the HDWLA Outreach Program. The 108-square meter single-storey training facility is built upon her 7,000-square meter lot in Sitio Manggahan, Barangay Second District. It is equipped with four platforms.

=== Inclusion in alleged ouster plot matrix ===
In April 2019, Diaz was listed among those allegedly involved in an ouster plot against president Rodrigo Duterte, as presented by Salvador Panelo who was Presidential Spokesperson at the time. She initially found the allegation laughable, and numerous government officials came to her defense, saying the inclusion of her name and that of fellow athlete Gretchen Ho was ridiculous, but Diaz eventually came to the realization that the inclusion of her name was a threat to her safety and that of her family. Panelo later backtracked on the inclusion of Diaz and Ho's names, saying they were not part of the alleged conspiracy.

== In popular media ==
Diaz's life leading to her silver medal win in the 2016 Summer Olympics was depicted in an episode of Maalaala Mo Kaya, a drama anthology series, aired on September 24, 2016. She was portrayed by Jane Oineza.

== Awards and recognitions ==
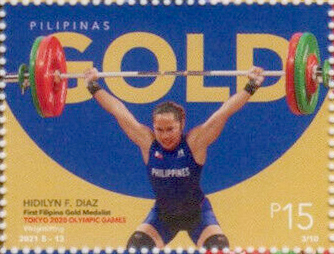
Diaz on a 2021 stamp of the Philippines

On February 14, 2017, Diaz was awarded as the Athlete of the Year of the Philippine Sportswriters Association. She is also the recipient of two honors from the Philippine House of Representatives; the Congressional Medals of Distinction (CMD) in 2016 and the Congressional Medal of Excellence (CME) in 2021. The CME, intended for Filipino Olympic gold medalists, was instituted by the Congress' lower house after Diaz won the first ever gold medal for the country in the 2020 Summer Olympics.

== See also ==
- List of Olympic medalists for the Philippines
- List of Olympic records in weightlifting

Olympic Games
| Preceded by Manny Pacquiao | Flagbearer for Philippines; London 2012 | Succeeded by Michael Christian Martinez |
