= Weightlifting at the 2020 Summer Olympics – Women's 55 kg =

Women's 55 kg at the Games of the XXXII Olympiad
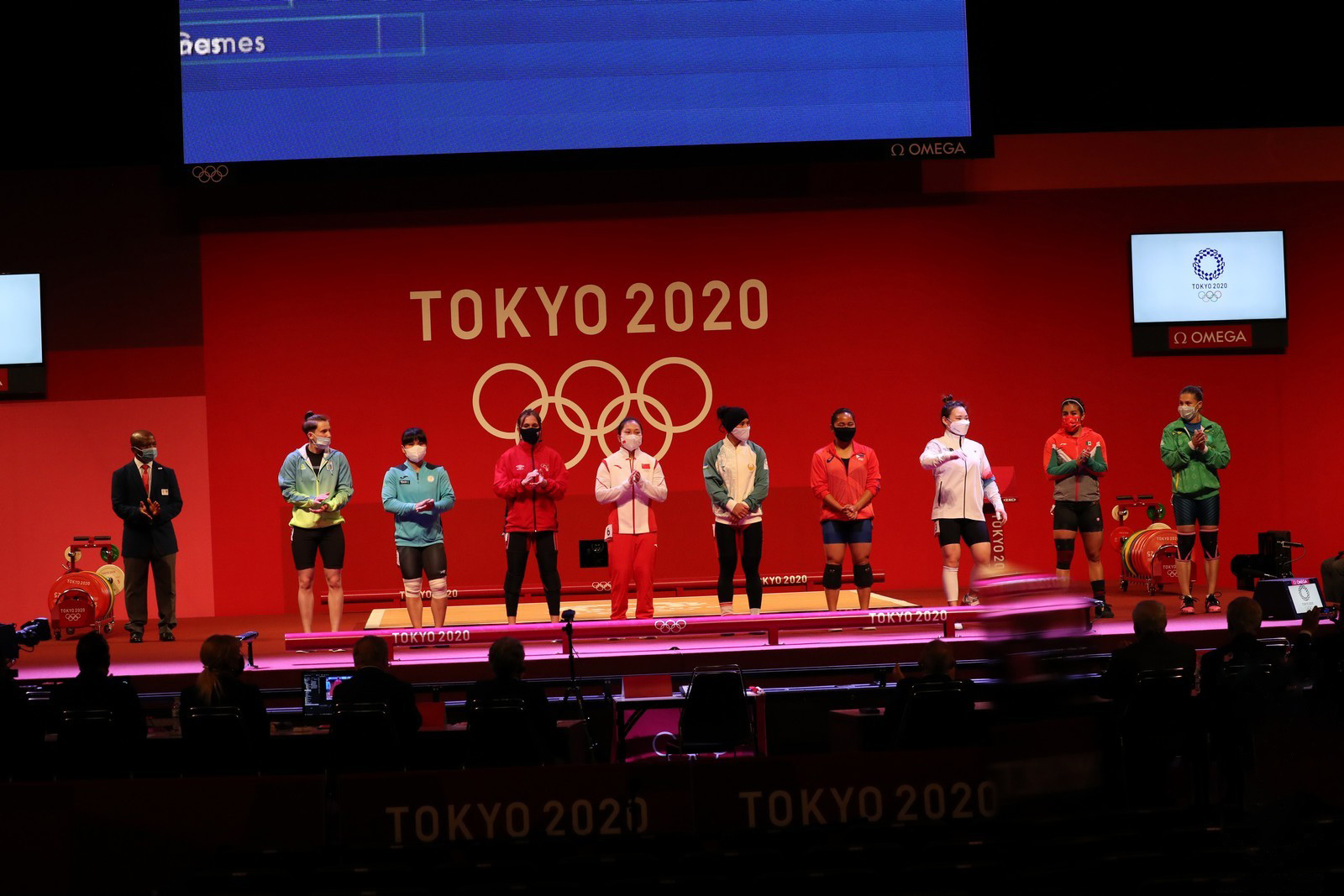
- Athletes' introduction before the event, pictured by NOC of Ukraine. From left: Konotop, Chinshanlo, Landoulsi, Liao, Nabieva, Diaz, Ham, López and Şermetowa.
- Venue: Tokyo International Forum
- Date: 26 July 2021
- Competitors: 14 from 14 nations
- Winning total: 224 kg OR

Medalists
1st place, gold medalist(s)		Hidilyn Diaz	Philippines
2nd place, silver medalist(s)		Liao Qiuyun	China
3rd place, bronze medalist(s)		Zulfiya Chinshanlo	Kazakhstan

The women's 55 kg weightlifting competition at the 2020 Summer Olympics in Tokyo took place on 26 July at the Tokyo International Forum.

The event was won by Hidilyn Diaz, the first Olympic gold medalist (in any event) for the Philippines. China's Liao Qiuyun took silver and Zulfiya Chinshanlo of Kazakhstan bronze.

Meanwhile, in the group B, Poland's Joanna Łochowska, Japan's Kanae Yagi, Canada's Rachel Leblanc-Bazinet, Chinese Taipei's Chiang Nien-hsin and Solomon Islands' Mary Kini Lifu earned their top 14 spots.

The bouquets were presented by IWF Executive Board Member Karoliina Lundahl (Olympian in weightlifting, Finland), and the medals were presented by IOC Executive Board Member Mikaela Cojuangco-Jaworski (Philippines).

== Background ==
Two lifters from the previous Olympics - Diaz (silver medallist) and Yagi - returned for the event. Chinshanlo and Łochowska also returned after 9 years since 2012, having missed the Rio Olympics. Two former Nanjing 2014 participants - Chiang (champion in 58 kg; representing Chinese Taipei), and Tunisia's Nouha Landoulsi (bronze medallist at the 53 kg) - made their senior Olympic debuts. Followed by other debutants, they were split into two groups (A and B).

During the snatch, all lifters did well in their first attempts, except South Korea's Ham Eun-ji and Yagi, who failed to complete. Uzbekistan's Muattar Nabieva later set a new Olympic record for the heaviest snatch ever to be lifted. They showed improvement in the second and third attempts, yet some had still fails. By the end of the snatch, Diaz and Łochowska lead the A and B groups (total lifts are 97 kg and 84 kg), chased up by Chinshanlo, Liao, Yagi, and Leblanc-Bazinet.

In clean and jerk, Not much difference were occurred. In group A, after failing two earlier attempts, Ham manages to lift on the third attempt, securing her survival. Ukraine's Kamila Konotop cleans all attempts, like Diaz and Liao. Diaz, Liao, and Chinshanlo compete in attempts to determine who is winning the medals. With the Kazakh having failed two attempts (123 kg and 125 kg), he takes up the bronze; Diaz takes up the gold, lifting 1 kg heavier (224 kg) than Liao (223 kg), who concedes silver, ensuring the Philippines' first gold medal at the Olympics in 100 years. On the other hand, Mexico's Ana Gabriela López and Landoulsi had failed the last two attempts. Their total lifts are 195 kg and 196 kg, placing them at the bottom two in that group, and Turkmenistan's Kristina Şermetowa missed just one lift (117 kg). With total lifting calculated at 205 kg, she sits at 6th place at the end of the event.

In group B, despite failed third attempts, all lifters earn their spots in total lifting. Łochowska, Yagi, and Leblanc-Bazinet leads the group, joined by Chiang and Kini Lifu (whose totals are 176 kg and 154 kg), with total lifts are 189 kg for the Polish, 183 kg for the host country (Japan), and 181 kg for the Canadian. None of these lifters in both groups are eliminated from the event, ensuring their survivals.

During the Victory Ceremony, Diaz, Liao (who had all clean attempts in both parts), and Chinshanlo are awarded medals by Lundahl and Cojuangco-Jarowski.

== Records ==
{{{caption}}}
World Record	Snatch	Li Yajun (CHN)	102 kg	Ashgabat, Turkmenistan	3 November 2018
World Record	Clean & Jerk	Liao Qiuyun (CHN)	129 kg	Pattaya, Thailand	20 September 2019
World Record	Total	Liao Qiuyun (CHN)	227 kg	Pattaya, Thailand	20 September 2019
Olympic Record	Snatch	Olympic Standard	97 kg	—	1 November 2018
Olympic Record	Clean & Jerk	Olympic Standard	121 kg	—	1 November 2018
Olympic Record	Total	Olympic Standard	217 kg	—	1 November 2018

== Results ==
Rank	Athlete	Nation	Group	Body weight	Snatch (kg)				Clean & Jerk (kg)				Total
Rank	Athlete	Nation	Group	Body weight	1	2	3	Result	1	2	3	Result	Total
1st place, gold medalist(s)	Hidilyn Diaz	Philippines	A	54.80	94	97	~~99~~	97	119	124	127	127 OR	224 OR
2nd place, silver medalist(s)	Liao Qiuyun	China	A	54.65	92	95	97	97	118	123	126	126	223
3rd place, bronze medalist(s)	Zulfiya Chinshanlo	Kazakhstan	A	54.95	90	~~93~~	~~93~~	90	~~123~~	123	~~125~~	123	213
4	Muattar Nabieva	Uzbekistan	A	54.95	95	~~98~~	98	98 OR	~~114~~	114	~~117~~	114	212
5	Kamila Konotop	Ukraine	A	54.95	91	94	~~96~~	94	106	110	112	112	206
6	Kristina Şermetowa	Turkmenistan	A	54.85	90	~~93~~	~~93~~	90	111	115	~~117~~	115	205
7	Ham Eun-ji	South Korea	A	54.90	~~85~~	85	~~90~~	85	~~115~~	~~115~~	116	116	201
8	Nouha Landoulsi	Tunisia	A	54.85	88	~~92~~	~~92~~	88	108	~~113~~	~~113~~	108	196
9	Ana Gabriela López	Mexico	A	54.80	90	~~94~~	~~95~~	90	105	~~110~~	~~110~~	105	195
10	Joanna Łochowska	Poland	B	54.70	81	84	~~86~~	84	~~102~~	102	~~106~~	102	186
11	Kanae Yagi	Japan	B	54.75	~~78~~	78	81	81	99	102	~~106~~	102	183
12	Rachel Leblanc-Bazinet	Canada	B	54.90	79	82	~~85~~	82	99	~~102~~	~~102~~	99	181
13	Chiang Nien-hsin	Chinese Taipei	B	54.80	75	78	81	81	95	~~100~~	~~101~~	95	176
14	Mary Kini Lifu	Solomon Islands	B	54.50	64	~~67~~	67	67	84	87	~~90~~	87	154

== New records ==
Snatch	98 kg	Muattar Nabieva (UZB)	OR
Clean & Jerk	123 kg	Liao Qiuyun (CHN)	OR
Clean & Jerk	124 kg	Hidilyn Diaz (PHI)	OR
Clean & Jerk	126 kg	Liao Qiuyun (CHN)	OR
Clean & Jerk	127 kg	Hidilyn Diaz (PHI)	OR
Total	220 kg	Liao Qiuyun (CHN)	OR
Total	221 kg	Hidilyn Diaz (PHI)	OR
Total	223 kg	Liao Qiuyun (CHN)	OR
Total	224 kg	Hidilyn Diaz (PHI)	OR
