= Weightlifting at the 2017 Summer Universiade – Women's 53 kg =

Women's 53 kg at the XXIX Summer Universiade
- Venues: Tamkang University Shao-Mo Memorial Gymnasium 7F
- Dates: 21 August 2017
- Competitors: 16 from 15 nations

Medalists
1st place, gold medalist(s)		Ri Su-yon	North Korea
2nd place, silver medalist(s)		Liu Feng	China
3rd place, bronze medalist(s)		Supattra Kaewkhong	Thailand

The women's 53 kg event at the 2017 Summer Universiade was held on 21 August at the Tamkang University Shao-Mo Memorial Gymnasium 7F.

== Records ==
Prior to this competition, the existing world and Universiade records were as follows.

- Initial records

Category		Nation	Athlete	Record	Place	Date	Meet
World record	Snatch	China	Li Ping	103 kg	Guangzhou, China	14 November 2010	2010 Asian Games
World record	Clean & Jerk	Kazakhstan	Zulfiya Chinshanlo	134 kg	Almaty, Kazakhstan	10 November 2014	2014 World Championships
World record	Total	Chinese Taipei	Hsu Shu-ching	233 kg	Incheon, South Korea	1 September 2014	2014 Asian Games
Universiade records	Snatch	China (CHN)	Ji Jing	100 kg	Shenzhen, China	14 August 2011	2011 Summer Universiade
Universiade records	Clean & Jerk	China (CHN)	Ji Jing	122 kg	Shenzhen, China	14 August 2011	2011 Summer Universiade
Universiade records	Total	China (CHN)	Ji Jing	222 kg	Shenzhen, China	14 August 2011	2011 Summer Universiade

== Results ==
Rank	Athlete	Group	Body weight	Snatch (kg)				Clean & Jerk (kg)				Total
Rank	Athlete	Group	Body weight	1	2	3	Result	1	2	3	Result	Total
1st place, gold medalist(s)	Ri Su-yon (PRK)	A	52.43	87	90	~~91~~	90	112	116	118	118	208
2nd place, silver medalist(s)	Liu Feng (CHN)	A	52.49	~~88~~	~~90~~	90	90	110	~~115~~	117	117	207
3rd place, bronze medalist(s)	Supattra Kaewkhong (THA)	A	52.44	83	86	~~89~~	86	105	~~108~~	111	111	197
4	Sopita Tanasan (THA)	A	51.90	84	88	~~91~~	88	104	~~108~~	108	108	196
5	Syarah Anggraini (INA)	A	52.30	~~77~~	~~79~~	79	79	100	104	~~107~~	104	183
6	Harshdeep Kaur (IND)	A	52.74	~~78~~	78	82	82	~~98~~	98	~~104~~	98	180
7	Carolanni Reyes Pozo (DOM)	A	52.91	73	76	~~78~~	76	91	95	~~97~~	95	171
8	Aigerim Aulbek (KAZ)	A	52.82	70	~~73~~	73	73	90	~~95~~	~~95~~	90	163
9	Ann-Maxime Bouffard (CAN)	A	51.96	~~70~~	~~70~~	70	70	85	89	~~92~~	89	159
10	Katrine Nim Bruhn (DEN)	B	52.90	~~70~~	~~70~~	70	70	85	~~89~~	89	89	159
11	Elien Rose Perez (PHI)	A	52.51	65	~~70~~	~~70~~	65	85	90	~~95~~	90	155
12	Jessica Yulieth Ramirez (COL)	B	52.97	67	~~72~~	~~72~~	67	82	~~85~~	86	86	153
13	Ophélie Cabon (FRA)	B	52.94	67	70	~~72~~	70	80	~~83~~	~~83~~	80	150
14	Jessica Preiss (SUI)	B	50.70	60	~~64~~	64	64	70	73	~~76~~	73	137
15	Elizabeth R. Cardenas (PER)	B	52.17	49	51	~~53~~	51	66	~~69~~	~~69~~	66	117
	Nastasja Štesl (SLO)	A	52.93	66	~~69~~	~~71~~	66	~~85~~	~~86~~	~~86~~	–	–
