= 2019 World Weightlifting Championships – Women's 55 kg =

Women's weightlifting championship

The women's 55 kg competition at the 2019 World Weightlifting Championships was held on 19 and 20 September 2019.

== Schedule ==
| Date | Time | Event |
|---|---|---|
| 19 September 2019 | 08:00 | Group D |
| 19 September 2019 | 22:30 | Group C |
| 20 September 2019 | 14:25 | Group B |
| 20 September 2019 | 20:25 | Group A |

== Medalists ==
| Event | Gold | | Silver | | Bronze | |
|---|---|---|---|---|---|---|
| Snatch | Zhang Wanqiong (CHN) | 99 kg | Liao Qiuyun (CHN) | 98 kg | Muattar Nabieva (UZB) | 96 kg |
| Clean & Jerk | Liao Qiuyun (CHN) | 129 kg | Zhang Wanqiong (CHN) | 123 kg | Hidilyn Diaz (PHI) | 121 kg |
| Total | Liao Qiuyun (CHN) | 227 kg | Zhang Wanqiong (CHN) | 222 kg | Hidilyn Diaz (PHI) | 214 kg |

== Records ==
Prior to this competition, the existing world records were as follows.

| World Record | Snatch | ~~Sukanya Srisurat (THA)~~; Li Yajun (CHN) | ~~105 kg~~ 102 kg | ~~Ashgabat, Turkmenistan~~; Ashgabat, Turkmenistan | ~~3 November 2018~~; 3 November 2018 |
| World Record | Clean & Jerk | Liao Qiuyun (CHN) | 128 kg | Ningbo, China | 22 April 2019 |
| World Record | Total | ~~Sukanya Srisurat (THA)~~; Li Yajun (CHN) | ~~232 kg~~ 225 kg | ~~Ashgabat, Turkmenistan~~; Ashgabat, Turkmenistan | ~~3 November 2018~~; 3 November 2018 |

- Sukanya Srisurat's world records were rescinded in February 2020.

== Results ==
| Rank | Athlete | Group | Snatch (kg) | | | | Clean & Jerk (kg) | | | | Total |
| Rank | Athlete | Group | 1 | 2 | 3 | Rank | 1 | 2 | 3 | Rank | Total |
|---|---|---|---|---|---|---|---|---|---|---|---|
| 1st place, gold medalist(s) | Liao Qiuyun (CHN) | A | ~~95~~ | 95 | 98 | 2nd place, silver medalist(s) | 120 | 125 | 129 | 1st place, gold medalist(s) | 227 |
| 2nd place, silver medalist(s) | Zhang Wanqiong (CHN) | A | 96 | ~~99~~ | 99 | 1st place, gold medalist(s) | 118 | 123 | ~~126~~ | 2nd place, silver medalist(s) | 222 |
| 3rd place, bronze medalist(s) | Hidilyn Diaz (PHI) | A | ~~93~~ | ~~93~~ | 93 | 8 | 115 | 118 | 121 | 3rd place, bronze medalist(s) | 214 |
| 4 | Zulfiya Chinshanlo (KAZ) | A | 90 | 93 | ~~95~~ | 7 | ~~120~~ | 120 | ~~122~~ | 4 | 213 |
| 5 | Yenny Sinisterra (COL) | A | ~~90~~ | 90 | 94 | 5 | 112 | 116 | ~~119~~ | 5 | 210 |
| 6 | Muattar Nabieva (UZB) | A | ~~92~~ | 93 | 96 | 3rd place, bronze medalist(s) | ~~112~~ | ~~113~~ | 113 | 6 | 209 |
| 7 | Ana Gabriela López (MEX) | B | ~~90~~ | 90 | 94 | 4 | 108 | ~~112~~ | ~~112~~ | 14 | 202 |
| 8 | Rachel Leblanc-Bazinet (CAN) | A | 86 | 89 | 91 | 10 | ~~108~~ | 108 | 110 | 11 | 201 |
| 9 | Jourdan Delacruz (USA) | B | ~~87~~ | 88 | ~~91~~ | 11 | 109 | 112 | ~~115~~ | 7 | 200 |
| 10 | Svetlana Ershova (RUS) | A | 88 | 91 | ~~92~~ | 9 | 106 | 109 | ~~112~~ | 13 | 200 |
| 11 | Kristina Şermetowa (TKM) | A | ~~83~~ | 83 | 86 | 14 | 107 | ~~110~~ | 110 | 12 | 196 |
| 12 | Joanna Łochowska (POL) | B | 80 | 83 | 85 | 18 | 107 | 110 | ~~113~~ | 8 | 195 |
| 13 | Kanae Yagi (JPN) | A | 83 | 85 | ~~87~~ | 19 | 107 | 110 | ~~112~~ | 10 | 195 |
| 14 | Shoely Mego (PER) | B | 78 | 82 | 84 | 21 | 103 | 108 | 110 | 9 | 194 |
| 15 | Jennifer Lombardo (ITA) | B | 82 | 85 | ~~86~~ | 16 | 105 | 108 | ~~110~~ | 15 | 193 |
| 16 | Kamila Konotop (UKR) | B | 83 | 86 | 88 | 12 | 100 | 104 | ~~106~~ | 18 | 192 |
| 17 | Rosane Santos (BRA) | C | 83 | ~~86~~ | 87 | 13 | 98 | 102 | 104 | 17 | 191 |
| 18 | Nina Sterckx (BEL) | C | 80 | 83 | 85 | 15 | 99 | ~~102~~ | 102 | 21 | 187 |
| 19 | Ayana Sadoyama (JPN) | B | 80 | 83 | ~~85~~ | 22 | 100 | 103 | ~~105~~ | 19 | 186 |
| 20 | Lucrezia Magistris (ITA) | B | ~~85~~ | 85 | ~~88~~ | 17 | 100 | ~~105~~ | ~~105~~ | 26 | 185 |
| 21 | Chiang Nien-hsin (TPE) | B | ~~80~~ | ~~80~~ | 80 | 28 | 105 | ~~110~~ | ~~110~~ | 16 | 185 |
| 22 | Letícia Laurindo (BRA) | C | 80 | ~~84~~ | 84 | 20 | ~~100~~ | 100 | ~~104~~ | 25 | 184 |
| 23 | Sarah Øvsthus (NOR) | B | 79 | ~~82~~ | 82 | 24 | ~~100~~ | 100 | ~~102~~ | 27 | 182 |
| 24 | Sabina Azimova (AZE) | C | 73 | 76 | 79 | 29 | 98 | 102 | ~~106~~ | 20 | 181 |
| 25 | Sümeyye Kentli (TUR) | C | 75 | 78 | 80 | 27 | 96 | 100 | ~~102~~ | 24 | 180 |
| 26 | Haylee Johnson (CAN) | D | 73 | 76 | 78 | 30 | 93 | 97 | 100 | 23 | 178 |
| 27 | Katrine Bruhn (DEN) | C | 76 | 79 | 82 | 23 | 96 | ~~99~~ | ~~100~~ | 31 | 178 |
| 28 | Atenery Hernández (ESP) | C | 80 | ~~83~~ | ~~83~~ | 26 | 95 | 98 | ~~101~~ | 29 | 178 |
| 29 | Rebekka Jacobsen (NOR) | C | 75 | 77 | 78 | 31 | 98 | ~~101~~ | ~~103~~ | 28 | 176 |
| 30 | Sneha Soren (IND) | D | 69 | 72 | ~~74~~ | 37 | 94 | 98 | 101 | 22 | 172 |
| 31 | Amy Williams (GBR) | C | 73 | 76 | ~~78~~ | 35 | 94 | 97 | ~~99~~ | 30 | 173 |
| 32 | Nouha Landoulsi (TUN) | C | 70 | 81 | ~~85~~ | 25 | 90 | ~~100~~ | ~~100~~ | 34 | 171 |
| 33 | Chamari Warnakulasuriya (SRI) | C | ~~75~~ | ~~75~~ | 75 | 36 | 93 | ~~96~~ | ~~96~~ | 32 | 168 |
| 34 | Aksana Zalatarova (ISR) | D | 70 | 74 | 77 | 33 | 86 | ~~90~~ | 90 | 33 | 167 |
| 35 | Sandra Jensen (DEN) | D | 73 | ~~76~~ | 76 | 34 | 89 | ~~91~~ | ~~92~~ | 35 | 165 |
| 36 | Mary Kini Lifu (SOL) | D | 70 | 74 | 77 | 32 | ~~85~~ | 85 | ~~89~~ | 37 | 162 |
| 37 | Poupak Basami (IRI) | D | 64 | 69 | 72 | 38 | 82 | 86 | ~~91~~ | 36 | 158 |
| 38 | Chuluunbaataryn Nyamzul (MGL) | D | 65 | ~~68~~ | ~~68~~ | 39 | 80 | 83 | ~~86~~ | 38 | 148 |
| 39 | Marina Marković (CRO) | D | 60 | 63 | 65 | 40 | 76 | ~~80~~ | 80 | 39 | 145 |
| — | Génesis Rodríguez (VEN) | A | 93 | ~~95~~ | ~~97~~ | 6 | ~~113~~ | ~~113~~ | ~~113~~ | — | — |
| — | Maya Ivanova (BUL) | B | ~~82~~ | ~~82~~ | ~~82~~ | — | ~~100~~ | ~~100~~ | ~~100~~ | — | — |

== New records ==
| Clean & Jerk | 129 kg | Liao Qiuyun (CHN) | WR |
| Total | 227 kg | Liao Qiuyun (CHN) | WR |
