= 2018 World Weightlifting Championships – Women's 55 kg =

The women's 55 kilograms competition at the 2018 World Weightlifting Championships was held on 1–3 November 2018.

In January 2019 Sukanya Srisurat the original gold medalist got stripped of her medal after testing positive for banned substances like-5a- androstane-3a, 17 bdiol (5aAdiol) etc.

== Schedule ==
| Date | Time | Event |
|---|---|---|
| 1 November 2018 | 10:00 | Group D |
| 1 November 2018 | 12:00 | Group C |
| 3 November 2018 | 12:00 | Group B |
| 3 November 2018 | 19:55 | Group A |

== Medalists ==
| Event | Gold | | Silver | | Bronze | |
|---|---|---|---|---|---|---|
| Snatch | Li Yajun (CHN) | 102 kg | Zhang Wanqiong (CHN) | 101 kg | Muattar Nabieva (UZB) | 98 kg |
| Clean & Jerk | Zhang Wanqiong (CHN) | 124 kg | Li Yajun (CHN) | 123 kg | Zulfiya Chinshanlo (KAZ) | 120 kg |
| Total | Li Yajun (CHN) | 225 kg | Zhang Wanqiong (CHN) | 225 kg | Zulfiya Chinshanlo (KAZ) | 213 kg |

== Records ==
Prior to this competition, the existing world records were as follows.

| World Record | Snatch | World Standard | 99 kg | — | 1 November 2018 |
| World Record | Clean & Jerk | World Standard | 124 kg | — | 1 November 2018 |
| World Record | Total | World Standard | 221 kg | — | 1 November 2018 |

== Results ==
| Rank | Athlete | Group | Snatch (kg) | | | | Clean & Jerk (kg) | | | | Total |
| Rank | Athlete | Group | 1 | 2 | 3 | Rank | 1 | 2 | 3 | Rank | Total |
|---|---|---|---|---|---|---|---|---|---|---|---|
| 1st place, gold medalist(s) | Li Yajun (CHN) | A | 97 | 100 | 102 | 1st place, gold medalist(s) | 117 | 121 | 123 | 2nd place, silver medalist(s) | 225 |
| 2nd place, silver medalist(s) | Zhang Wanqiong (CHN) | A | 96 | 99 | 101 | 2nd place, silver medalist(s) | 118 | 122 | 124 | 1st place, gold medalist(s) | 225 |
| 3rd place, bronze medalist(s) | Zulfiya Chinshanlo (KAZ) | A | 90 | 93 | ~~95~~ | 8 | ~~120~~ | 120 | ~~125~~ | 3rd place, bronze medalist(s) | 213 |
| 4 | Muattar Nabieva (UZB) | A | 90 | 94 | 98 | 3rd place, bronze medalist(s) | 110 | 114 | ~~119~~ | 8 | 212 |
| 5 | Nouha Landoulsi (TUN) | A | 93 | ~~96~~ | 97 | 4 | 114 | ~~117~~ | ~~119~~ | 7 | 211 |
| 6 | Kristina Şermetowa (TKM) | A | 90 | 93 | ~~95~~ | 7 | 113 | 117 | ~~120~~ | 5 | 210 |
| 7 | Alexandra Escobar (ECU) | B | 91 | 93 | ~~95~~ | 5 | 113 | ~~116~~ | 116 | 6 | 209 |
| 8 | Ri Su-yon (PRK) | A | ~~88~~ | 88 | ~~92~~ | 13 | ~~118~~ | ~~118~~ | 118 | 4 | 206 |
| 9 | Hidilyn Diaz (PHI) | B | 88 | 91 | 93 | 6 | 110 | ~~115~~ | ~~115~~ | 13 | 203 |
| 10 | Chika Amalaha (NGR) | D | 90 | ~~95~~ | ~~95~~ | 9 | 112 | ~~117~~ | ~~117~~ | 9 | 202 |
| 11 | Ana Gabriela López (MEX) | B | 85 | ~~90~~ | 90 | 11 | 105 | 110 | ~~113~~ | 14 | 200 |
| 12 | Syarah Anggraini (INA) | B | 84 | 87 | ~~90~~ | 15 | 105 | ~~110~~ | 111 | 12 | 198 |
| 13 | Jourdan Delacruz (USA) | B | ~~83~~ | 83 | 86 | 16 | 107 | 110 | 112 | 10 | 198 |
| 14 | Rosane Santos (BRA) | B | 85 | 90 | ~~92~~ | 10 | 102 | 106 | ~~108~~ | 20 | 196 |
| 15 | Svetlana Ershova (RUS) | B | 83 | 87 | ~~89~~ | 14 | 103 | 106 | 109 | 15 | 196 |
| 16 | Yenny Sinisterra (COL) | B | ~~85~~ | 85 | ~~90~~ | 18 | 106 | 111 | ~~115~~ | 11 | 196 |
| 17 | Joanna Łochowska (POL) | A | 88 | ~~90~~ | ~~90~~ | 12 | 108 | ~~111~~ | ~~112~~ | 16 | 196 |
| 18 | Caitlin Hogan (USA) | B | 83 | 85 | ~~87~~ | 17 | 106 | ~~110~~ | ~~110~~ | 19 | 191 |
| 19 | Rachel Leblanc-Bazinet (CAN) | D | 80 | 84 | ~~86~~ | 19 | 103 | 106 | ~~108~~ | 18 | 190 |
| 20 | Tessy Sandi (PER) | B | 77 | 80 | ~~83~~ | 29 | 103 | 107 | ~~109~~ | 17 | 187 |
| 21 | Liudmila Psyshchanitsa (BLR) | B | ~~79~~ | 79 | 82 | 22 | 100 | 104 | ~~107~~ | 21 | 186 |
| 22 | Lucrezia Magistris (ITA) | C | 82 | ~~85~~ | ~~85~~ | 20 | 95 | 100 | 103 | 22 | 185 |
| 23 | Ayana Sadoyama (JPN) | C | 78 | 80 | 82 | 21 | 97 | 100 | 102 | 24 | 184 |
| 24 | Nina Sterckx (BEL) | D | 75 | 78 | 81 | 23 | 94 | 98 | 101 | 25 | 182 |
| 25 | Kanae Yagi (JPN) | C | 78 | ~~80~~ | 80 | 28 | 96 | 100 | 102 | 23 | 182 |
| 26 | Sarah Øvsthus (NOR) | C | ~~77~~ | 77 | 79 | 31 | ~~97~~ | 97 | 99 | 27 | 178 |
| 27 | Kamila Konotop (UKR) | C | 78 | ~~81~~ | 81 | 24 | 92 | 94 | 96 | 33 | 177 |
| 28 | Johanni Taljaard (RSA) | C | 76 | 80 | ~~85~~ | 27 | 97 | ~~100~~ | ~~100~~ | 30 | 177 |
| 29 | Natalya Sheleh (BLR) | C | ~~77~~ | 77 | ~~79~~ | 33 | 90 | 95 | 98 | 29 | 175 |
| 30 | Marilou Dozois-Prévost (CAN) | D | 70 | 73 | 75 | 35 | ~~98~~ | 98 | ~~101~~ | 28 | 173 |
| 31 | Mariia Hanhur (UKR) | C | 76 | ~~78~~ | 78 | 32 | 92 | 95 | ~~97~~ | 34 | 173 |
| 32 | Katrine Bruhn (DEN) | D | 73 | ~~75~~ | 76 | 34 | 93 | 96 | ~~99~~ | 32 | 172 |
| 33 | Aksana Zalatarova (ISR) | D | 75 | 78 | 80 | 25 | 87 | ~~90~~ | 90 | 35 | 170 |
| 34 | Amy Williams (GBR) | D | 71 | ~~74~~ | 74 | 36 | 92 | 96 | ~~100~~ | 31 | 170 |
| 35 | Sofía Rito (URU) | D | 69 | 72 | ~~74~~ | 37 | ~~87~~ | 87 | ~~90~~ | 37 | 159 |
| 36 | Sandra Jensen (DEN) | D | 71 | ~~73~~ | ~~73~~ | 38 | ~~85~~ | 88 | ~~90~~ | 36 | 159 |
| 37 | Leonora Brajshori (KOS) | D | ~~59~~ | ~~59~~ | 59 | 39 | 70 | 72 | ~~75~~ | 38 | 131 |
| — | Atenery Hernández (ESP) | C | 80 | ~~83~~ | ~~83~~ | 26 | — | — | — | — | — |
| — | Sümeyye Kentli (TUR) | C | 79 | ~~82~~ | — | 30 | — | — | — | — | — |
| — | Ayşegül Çoban (TUR) | C | ~~75~~ | ~~75~~ | ~~75~~ | — | 95 | 100 | ~~103~~ | 26 | — |
| DQ | Sukanya Srisurat (THA) | A | 101 | 103 | 105 | — | 122 | 125 | 127 | — | — |
| DQ | Cristina Iovu (ROU) | A | 94 | 97 | ~~100~~ | — | ~~116~~ | 118 | 123 | — | — |

== New records ==
| Snatch | 100 kg | Li Yajun (CHN) | WR |
| Snatch | ~~101 kg~~ 101 kg | ~~Sukanya Srisurat (THA)~~; Zhang Wanqiong (CHN) | ~~WR~~; WR |
| Snatch | 102 kg | Li Yajun (CHN) | WR |
| Snatch | ~~103 kg~~ | ~~Sukanya Srisurat (THA)~~ | ~~WR~~ |
| Snatch | ~~105 kg~~ | ~~Sukanya Srisurat (THA)~~ | ~~WR~~ |
| Clean & Jerk | ~~125 kg~~ | ~~Sukanya Srisurat (THA)~~ | ~~WR~~ |
| Clean & Jerk | ~~127 kg~~ | ~~Sukanya Srisurat (THA)~~ | ~~WR~~ |
| Total | 223 kg | Li Yajun (CHN) | WR |
| Total | ~~227 kg~~ 225 kg | ~~Sukanya Srisurat (THA)~~; Li Yajun (CHN) | ~~WR~~; WR |
| Total | ~~230 kg~~ | ~~Sukanya Srisurat (THA)~~ | ~~WR~~ |
| Total | ~~232 kg~~ | ~~Sukanya Srisurat (THA)~~ | ~~WR~~ |
