= List of Peruvian records in Olympic weightlifting =

The following are the national records in Olympic weightlifting in Peru. Records are maintained in each weight class for the snatch lift, clean and jerk lift, and the total for both lifts by the Federación Deportiva Peruana de Levantamiento de Pesas (FDPLP).

== Current records ==
=== Men ===
Event	Record	Athlete	Date	Meet	Place	Ref
60 kg
Snatch						
Clean & Jerk						
Total						
65 kg
Snatch	131 kg	Luis Bardalez	13 July 2025	Pan American Championships	Cali, Colombia	
Clean & Jerk	168 kg	Luis Bardalez	13 July 2025	Pan American Championships	Cali, Colombia	
Total	299 kg	Luis Bardalez	13 July 2025	Pan American Championships	Cali, Colombia	
71 kg
Snatch						
Clean & Jerk						
Total						
79 kg
Snatch	kg					
Clean & Jerk	kg					
Total	kg					
88 kg
Snatch	135 kg	Amel Atencia	24 November 2025	Bolivarian Games	Lima, Peru	
Clean & Jerk	180 kg	Amel Atencia	24 November 2025	Bolivarian Games	Lima, Peru	
Total	315 kg	Amel Atencia	24 November 2025	Bolivarian Games	Lima, Peru	
94 kg
Snatch	114 kg	Hidver Angulo	24 November 2025	Bolivarian Games	Lima, Peru	
Clean & Jerk	150 kg	Hidver Angulo	24 November 2025	Bolivarian Games	Lima, Peru	
Total	264 kg	Hidver Angulo	24 November 2025	Bolivarian Games	Lima, Peru	
110 kg
Snatch	kg					
Clean & Jerk	kg					
Total	kg					
+110 kg
Snatch	kg					
Clean & Jerk	kg					
Total	kg					

=== Women ===
Event	Record	Athlete	Date	Meet	Place	Ref
48 kg
Snatch	57 kg	Faviana Gavidia	13 July 2025	Pan American Championships	Cali, Colombia	
Clean & Jerk	80 kg	Faviana Gavidia	13 July 2025	Pan American Championships	Cali, Colombia	
Total	137 kg	Faviana Gavidia	13 July 2025	Pan American Championships	Cali, Colombia	
53 kg
Snatch	80 kg	Shoely Mego	13 July 2025	Pan American Championships	Cali, Colombia	
Clean & Jerk	106 kg	Shoely Mego	13 July 2025	Pan American Championships	Cali, Colombia	
Total	186 kg	Shoely Mego	13 July 2025	Pan American Championships	Cali, Colombia	
58 kg
Snatch	80 kg	Katerin Olivera	23 November 2025	Bolivarian Games	Lima, Peru	
Clean & Jerk	97 kg	Katerin Olivera	23 November 2025	Bolivarian Games	Lima, Peru	
Total	177 kg	Katerin Olivera	23 November 2025	Bolivarian Games	Lima, Peru	
63 kg
Snatch						
Clean & Jerk						
Total						
69 kg
Snatch						
Clean & Jerk						
Total						
77 kg
Snatch						
Clean & Jerk						
Total						
86 kg
Snatch						
Clean & Jerk						
Total						
+86 kg
Snatch						
Clean & Jerk						
Total						

== Historical records ==
=== Men (2018–2025) ===
Event	Record	Athlete	Date	Meet	Place	Ref
55 kg
Snatch	86 kg	Kevin Reto Fasabi	30 April 2025	World Junior Championships	Lima, Peru	
Clean & Jerk	110 kg	Kevin Reto Fasabi	30 April 2025	World Junior Championships	Lima, Peru	
Total	196 kg	Kevin Reto Fasabi	30 April 2025	World Junior Championships	Lima, Peru	
61 kg
Snatch	120 kg	Luis Bardalez	10 June 2023	IWF Grand Prix	Havana, Cuba	
Clean & Jerk	155 kg	Luis Bardalez	2 April 2024	World Cup	Phuket, Thailand	
Total	270 kg	Luis Bardalez	10 June 2023	IWF Grand Prix	Havana, Cuba	
67 kg
Snatch	133 kg	Luis Bardalez	20 April 2021	Pan American Championships	Santo Domingo, Dominican Republic	
Clean & Jerk	168 kg	Luis Bardalez	November 2021	Pan American Championships	Guayaquil, Ecuador	
Total	298 kg	Luis Bardalez	20 April 2021	Pan American Championships	Santo Domingo, Dominican Republic	
73 kg
Snatch	141 kg	Óscar Terrones	28 July 2019	Pan American Games	Lima, Peru	
Clean & Jerk	163 kg	Pedro Yohamona	24 April 2019	Pan American Championships	Guatemala City, Guatemala	
Total	304 kg	Óscar Terrones	28 July 2019	Pan American Games	Lima, Peru	
81 kg
Snatch	130 kg	Amel Atencia	25 April 2019	Pan American Championships	Guatemala City, Guatemala	
Clean & Jerk	160 kg	Amel Atencia	25 April 2019	Pan American Championships	Guatemala City, Guatemala	
Total	290 kg	Amel Atencia	25 April 2019	Pan American Championships	Guatemala City, Guatemala	
89 kg
Snatch	150 kg	Amel Atencia	26 February 2024	Pan American Championships	Caracas, Venezuela	
Clean & Jerk	190 kg	Amel Atencia	5 April 2024	World Cup	Phuket, Thailand	
Total	340 kg	Amel Atencia	5 April 2024	World Cup	Phuket, Thailand	
96 kg
Snatch	150 kg	Amel Atencia	14 June 2023	IWF Grand Prix	Havana, Cuba	
Clean & Jerk	192 kg	Amel Atencia	12 September 2023	World Championships	Riyadh, Saudi Arabia	
Total	342 kg	Amel Atencia	12 September 2023	World Championships	Riyadh, Saudi Arabia	
102 kg
Snatch	150 kg	Hernán Viera	26 April 2019	Pan American Championships	Guatemala City, Guatemala	
Clean & Jerk	195 kg	Hernán Viera	26 April 2019	Pan American Championships	Guatemala City, Guatemala	
Total	345 kg	Hernán Viera	26 April 2019	Pan American Championships	Guatemala City, Guatemala	
109 kg
Snatch	156 kg	Hernán Viera	November 2021	Pan American Championships	Guayaquil, Ecuador	
Clean & Jerk	210 kg	Hernán Viera	10 April 2024	World Cup	Phuket, Thailand	
Total	361 kg	Hernán Viera	24 April 2021	Pan American Championships	Santo Domingo, Dominican Republic	
+109 kg
Snatch	150 kg	Hernán Viera	28 February 2024	Pan American Championships	Caracas, Venezuela	
Clean & Jerk	215 kg	Hernán Viera	28 February 2024	Pan American Championships	Caracas, Venezuela	
Total	365 kg	Hernán Viera	28 February 2024	Pan American Championships	Caracas, Venezuela	

=== Women (2018–2025) ===
Event	Record	Athlete	Date	Meet	Place	Ref
45 kg
Snatch	69 kg	Fiorella Cueva	April 2019	Pan American Championships	Guatemala City, Guatemala	
Clean & Jerk	90 kg	Fiorella Cueva	April 2019	Pan American Championships	Guatemala City, Guatemala	
Total	159 kg	Fiorella Cueva	April 2019	Pan American Championships	Guatemala City, Guatemala	
49 kg
Snatch	77 kg	Shoely Mego	1 April 2024	World Cup	Phuket, Thailand	
Clean & Jerk	97 kg	Shoely Mego	1 April 2024	World Cup	Phuket, Thailand	
Total	174 kg	Shoely Mego	1 April 2024	World Cup	Phuket, Thailand	
55 kg
Snatch	87 kg	Shoely Mego	10 June 2023	IWF Grand Prix	Havana, Cuba	
Clean & Jerk	110 kg	Shoely Mego	28 July 2019	Pan American Games	Lima, Peru	
Total	195 kg	Shoely Mego	5 September 2023	World Championships	Riyadh, Saudi Arabia	
59 kg
Snatch	82 kg	Shoely Mego	April 2019	Pan American Championships	Guatemala City, Guatemala	
Clean & Jerk	113 kg	Shoely Mego	April 2019	Pan American Championships	Guatemala City, Guatemala	
Total	195 kg	Shoely Mego	April 2019	Pan American Championships	Guatemala City, Guatemala	
64 kg
Snatch	81 kg	Angie Gardenas	April 2019	Pan American Championships	Guatemala City, Guatemala	
Clean & Jerk	112 kg	Angie Gardenas	April 2019	Pan American Championships	Guatemala City, Guatemala	
Total	193 kg	Angie Gardenas	April 2019	Pan American Championships	Guatemala City, Guatemala	
71 kg
Snatch						
Clean & Jerk						
Total						
76 kg
Snatch	87 kg	Estrella Saldarriaga	April 2019	Pan American Championships	Guatemala City, Guatemala	
Clean & Jerk	111 kg	Estrella Saldarriaga	April 2019	Pan American Championships	Guatemala City, Guatemala	
Total	198 kg	Estrella Saldarriaga	April 2019	Pan American Championships	Guatemala City, Guatemala	
81 kg
Snatch	86 kg	Estrella Saldarriaga	23 April 2021	Pan American Championships	Santo Domingo, Dominican Republic	
Clean & Jerk	107 kg	Estrella Saldarriaga	23 April 2021	Pan American Championships	Santo Domingo, Dominican Republic	
Total	193 kg	Estrella Saldarriaga	23 April 2021	Pan American Championships	Santo Domingo, Dominican Republic	
87 kg
Snatch	85 kg	Angie Castro	April 2019	Pan American Championships	Guatemala City, Guatemala	
Clean & Jerk	113 kg	Angie Castro	April 2019	Pan American Championships	Guatemala City, Guatemala	
Total	198 kg	Angie Castro	April 2019	Pan American Championships	Guatemala City, Guatemala	
+87 kg
Snatch						
Clean & Jerk						
Total						
