= Weightlifting at the 2018 Asian Games – Women's 53 kg =

Women's 53 kg at the 2018 Asian Games
- Venue: Jakarta International Expo
- Date: 21 August 2018
- Competitors: 12 from 9 nations

Medalists
gold medal	Hidilyn Diaz	Philippines
silver medal	Kristina Şermetowa	Turkmenistan
bronze medal	Surodchana Khambao	Thailand

The Women's 53 kilograms event at the 2018 Asian Games took place on 21 August 2018 at the Jakarta International Expo Hall A.

== Schedule ==
All times are Western Indonesia Time (UTC+07:00)

Date	Time	Event
Tuesday, 21 August 2018	17:00	Group A

== Records ==
Prior to this competition, the existing world, Asian and Games records were as follows.

World Record	Snatch	Li Ping (CHN)	103 kg	Guangzhou, China	14 November 2010
World Record	Clean & Jerk	Zulfiya Chinshanlo (KAZ)	134 kg	Almaty, Kazakhstan	10 November 2014
World Record	Total	Hsu Shu-ching (TPE)	233 kg	Incheon, South Korea	21 September 2014
Asian Record	Snatch	Li Ping (CHN)	103 kg	Guangzhou, China	14 November 2010
Asian Record	Clean & Jerk	Zulfiya Chinshanlo (KAZ)	134 kg	Almaty, Kazakhstan	10 November 2014
Asian Record	Total	Hsu Shu-ching (TPE)	233 kg	Incheon, South Korea	21 September 2014
Games Record	Snatch	Li Ping (CHN)	103 kg	Guangzhou, China	14 November 2010
Games Record	Clean & Jerk	Zulfiya Chinshanlo (KAZ)	132 kg	Incheon, South Korea	21 September 2014
Games Record	Total	Hsu Shu-ching (TPE)	233 kg	Incheon, South Korea	21 September 2014

== Results ==
Rank	Athlete	Group	Snatch (kg)				Clean & Jerk (kg)				Total
Rank	Athlete	Group	1	2	3	Result	1	2	3	Result	Total
1st place, gold medalist(s)	Hidilyn Diaz (PHI)	A	88	90	92	92	110	115	~~117~~	115	207
2nd place, silver medalist(s)	Kristina Şermetowa (TKM)	A	88	91	93	93	110	113	~~116~~	113	206
3rd place, bronze medalist(s)	Surodchana Khambao (THA)	A	~~86~~	86	~~89~~	86	107	110	115	115	201
4	Kim Chung-sim (PRK)	A	85	88	~~90~~	88	112	~~116~~	~~116~~	112	200
5	Sopita Tanasan (THA)	A	90	~~93~~	~~94~~	90	106	109	~~111~~	109	199
6	Syarah Anggraini (INA)	A	85	88	90	90	107	~~111~~	~~111~~	107	197
7	Kanae Yagi (JPN)	A	82	84	~~86~~	84	103	106	~~113~~	106	190
8	Dessa delos Santos (PHI)	A	75	80	~~83~~	80	95	100	~~103~~	100	180
9	Gansereeteriin Baasanjargal (MGL)	A	~~76~~	76	~~80~~	76	95	99	~~101~~	99	175
10	Chamari Warnakulasuriya (SRI)	A	73	~~77~~	~~79~~	73	93	96	~~98~~	96	169
11	Ayana Sadoyama (JPN)	A	70	73	75	75	88	~~91~~	91	91	166
12	Sanju Chaudhary (NEP)	A	68	72	~~73~~	72	82	86	~~88~~	86	158
