= 2017 World Weightlifting Championships – Women's 53 kg =

The Women's 53 kilograms competition at the 2017 World Weightlifting Championships was held on 30 November 2017.

== Schedule ==
Date	Time	Event
29 November 2017	08:55	Group B
30 November 2017	17:25	Group A

== Medalists ==
Event	Gold		Silver		Bronze	
Snatch	Sopita Tanasan (THA)	96 kg	Kristina Şermetowa (TKM)	91 kg	Joanna Łochowska (POL)	87 kg
Clean & Jerk	Sopita Tanasan (THA)	114 kg	Hidilyn Diaz (PHI)	113 kg	Kristina Şermetowa (TKM)	113 kg
Total	Sopita Tanasan (THA)	210 kg	Kristina Şermetowa (TKM)	204 kg	Hidilyn Diaz (PHI)	199 kg

== Records ==
Prior to this competition, the existing world records were as follows.

World Record	Snatch	Li Ping (CHN)	103 kg	Guangzhou, China	14 November 2010
World Record	Clean & Jerk	Zulfiya Chinshanlo (KAZ)	134 kg	Almaty, Kazakhstan	10 November 2014
World Record	Total	Hsu Shu-ching (TPE)	233 kg	Incheon, South Korea	21 September 2014

== Results ==
Rank	Athlete	Group	Snatch (kg)				Clean & Jerk (kg)				Total
Rank	Athlete	Group	1	2	3	Rank	1	2	3	Rank	Total
1st place, gold medalist(s)	Sopita Tanasan (THA)	A	91	94	96	1st place, gold medalist(s)	110	114	~~117~~	1st place, gold medalist(s)	210
2nd place, silver medalist(s)	Kristina Şermetowa (TKM)	A	88	~~91~~	91	2nd place, silver medalist(s)	109	111	113	3rd place, bronze medalist(s)	204
3rd place, bronze medalist(s)	Hidilyn Diaz (PHI)	A	~~85~~	86	~~90~~	5	110	113	~~115~~	2nd place, silver medalist(s)	199
4	Supattra Kaewkhong (THA)	A	83	~~86~~	87	4	107	111	~~114~~	4	198
5	Joanna Łochowska (POL)	A	87	~~89~~	~~89~~	3rd place, bronze medalist(s)	108	111	~~115~~	5	198
6	Kanae Yagi (JPN)	A	83	~~85~~	85	6	107	110	~~112~~	7	195
7	Caitlin Hogan (USA)	A	83	~~86~~	~~87~~	7	102	106	111	6	194
8	Ana Gabriela López (MEX)	B	80	83	~~86~~	8	~~98~~	98	101	11	184
9	Letícia Laurindo (BRA)	A	~~80~~	80	~~87~~	11	~~103~~	103	~~107~~	8	183
10	Atenery Hernández (ESP)	B	80	~~83~~	~~83~~	10	~~100~~	100	103	10	183
11	Yenny Sinisterra (COL)	B	78	81	~~84~~	9	95	100	~~104~~	13	181
12	Roilya Ranaivosoa (MRI)	B	75	78	~~80~~	13	95	~~100~~	100	17	178
13	Khumukcham Sanjita Chanu (IND)	B	77	~~80~~	~~80~~	14	95	100	~~104~~	14	177
14	Giorgia Russo (ITA)	B	72	75	~~77~~	16	~~100~~	100	~~105~~	15	175
15	Sarah Øvsthus (NOR)	B	75	78	~~80~~	12	~~96~~	96	~~100~~	18	174
16	Katrine Bruhn (DEN)	B	71	74	76	15	~~89~~	89	93	20	169
17	Fraer Morrow (GBR)	B	69	~~72~~	~~72~~	17	87	90	94	19	163
18	Rachel Hayes (ISR)	B	66	~~69~~	~~69~~	18	85	~~88~~	~~89~~	21	151
—	Yoon Jin-hee (KOR)	A	~~85~~	~~85~~	~~89~~	—	—	—	—	—	—
—	Trần Thị Mỹ Dung (VIE)	A	~~86~~	~~87~~	~~89~~	—	100	~~105~~	~~105~~	12	—
—	Rosane Santos (BRA)	A	~~88~~	~~88~~	~~90~~	—	~~100~~	100	~~107~~	16	—
—	Ngô Thị Quyên (VIE)	B	~~75~~	~~75~~	~~75~~	—	95	100	103	9	—
DQ	Hsu Shu-ching (TPE)	A	90	93	~~95~~	—	—	—	—	—	—
