= 2023 World Weightlifting Championships – Women's 55 kg =

The women's 55 kilograms competition at the 2023 World Weightlifting Championships was held on 5 and 6 September 2023.

== Schedule ==
Date	Time	Event
5 September 2023	21:30	Group C
6 September 2023	14:00	Group B
6 September 2023	19:00	Group A

== Medalists ==
Event	Gold		Silver		Bronze	
Snatch	Chen Guan-ling (TPE)	91 kg	Rohelys Galvis (COL)	90 kg	Irene Borrego (MEX)	89 kg
Clean & Jerk	Chen Guan-ling (TPE)	112 kg	Rohelys Galvis (COL)	111 kg	Rosalba Morales (COL)	110 kg
Total	Chen Guan-ling (TPE)	203 kg	Rohelys Galvis (COL)	201 kg	Irene Borrego (MEX)	199 kg

== Records ==
Prior to this competition, the existing world records were as follows.

World Record	Snatch	Li Yajun (CHN)	102 kg	Ashgabat, Turkmenistan	3 November 2018
World Record	Clean & Jerk	Liao Qiuyun (CHN)	129 kg	Pattaya, Thailand	20 September 2019
World Record	Total	Liao Qiuyun (CHN)	227 kg	Pattaya, Thailand	20 September 2019

== Results ==
Rank	Athlete	Group	Snatch (kg)				Clean & Jerk (kg)				Total
Rank	Athlete	Group	1	2	3	Rank	1	2	3	Rank	Total
1st place, gold medalist(s)	Chen Guan-ling (TPE)	A	88	91	~~93~~	1st place, gold medalist(s)	108	~~112~~	112	1st place, gold medalist(s)	203
2nd place, silver medalist(s)	Rohelys Galvis (COL)	A	~~87~~	87	90	2nd place, silver medalist(s)	105	109	111	2nd place, silver medalist(s)	201
3rd place, bronze medalist(s)	Irene Borrego (MEX)	A	85	89	~~92~~	3rd place, bronze medalist(s)	106	~~110~~	110	4	199
4	Andreea Cotruţa (ROU)	A	87	~~90~~	~~90~~	5	107	~~110~~	110	5	197
5	Shoely Mego (PER)	B	82	85	87	4	105	~~108~~	108	6	195
6	Rosalba Morales (COL)	A	85	~~88~~	~~88~~	9	110	~~113~~	~~113~~	3rd place, bronze medalist(s)	195
7	Aleksandra Grigoryan (ARM)	A	83	~~86~~	~~86~~	12	~~107~~	107	~~114~~	8	190
8	Josée Gallant (CAN)	B	84	~~88~~	~~88~~	11	~~104~~	105	~~108~~	9	189
9	Jamila Panfilova (UZB)	A	82	~~85~~	87	6	102	~~105~~	~~106~~	15	189
10	Sol Anette Waaler (NOR)	B	83	86	~~88~~	7	102	~~105~~	~~105~~	14	188
11	Juliana Klarisa (INA)	B	79	~~82~~	~~83~~	20	103	107	~~112~~	7	186
12	Windy Cantika Aisah (INA)	B	~~81~~	81	85	8	100	~~105~~	~~105~~	17	185
13	Jenly Tegu Wini (SOL)	C	75	80	84	10	100	~~106~~	~~106~~	16	184
14	Alba Sánchez (ESP)	B	80	~~84~~	~~84~~	15	100	103	~~105~~	11	183
15	Scheila Meister (SUI)	A	~~80~~	80	~~84~~	18	~~103~~	103	~~105~~	13	183
16	Aline Facciolla (WRT)	B	77	~~81~~	82	13	95	~~100~~	100	18	182
17	Rebekka Tao Jacobsen (NOR)	B	77	~~79~~	~~80~~	21	102	104	~~107~~	10	181
18	Sarikanirina Bakoliharisoa (MAD)	C	~~75~~	75	80	14	95	~~105~~	~~105~~	19	175
19	Marlous Schuilwerve (NED)	B	~~77~~	77	80	16	~~93~~	93	~~96~~	20	173
20	Issi Agrait (PUR)	C	71	75	79	19	~~90~~	91	~~95~~	22	170
21	Atenery Hernández (ESP)	C	72	74	~~76~~	23	92	~~95~~	~~95~~	21	166
22	Ana Gabriela López (MEX)	C	75	~~80~~	~~80~~	22	80	85	90	23	165
23	Margarida Pontes (POR)	C	60	~~65~~	~~66~~	24	80	85	~~88~~	24	145
24	Hanan Aameri (KSA)	C	54	~~58~~	58	25	~~70~~	70	~~77~~	27	128
25	Liyana Safiah Sidek (BRU)	C	53	55	~~58~~	26	68	~~71~~	71	26	126
—	Celine Delia (ITA)	A	80	~~85~~	~~85~~	17	~~110~~	~~110~~	~~111~~	—	—
—	Izabella Yaylyan (ARM)	A	~~85~~	—	—	—	—	—	—	—	—
—	Rose Harvey (CAN)	B	~~81~~	~~81~~	~~81~~	—	100	103	~~105~~	12	—
—	Tika Maya Gurung (NEP)	C	~~62~~	~~62~~	~~62~~	—	~~80~~	80	~~86~~	25	—
—	Sanikun Tanasan (THA)	C	~~85~~	—	—	—	—	—	—	—	—
—	Bindyarani Devi (IND)	C	—	—	—	—	—	—	—	—	—
