= List of Uruguayan records in Olympic weightlifting =

The following are the records of Uruguay in Olympic weightlifting. Records are maintained in each weight class for the snatch lift, clean and jerk lift, and the total for both lifts by the Federacion Uruguaya de Pesas.

== Men ==
| Event | Record | Athlete | Date | Meet | Place | Ref |
55 kg
| Snatch | | | | | | |
| Clean and Jerk | | | | | | |
| Total | | | | | | |
61 kg
| Snatch | | | | | | |
| Clean & Jerk | | | | | | |
| Total | | | | | | |
67 kg
| Snatch | | | | | | |
| Clean & Jerk | | | | | | |
| Total | | | | | | |
73 kg
| Snatch | | | | | | |
| Clean and Jerk | | | | | | |
| Total | | | | | | |
81 kg
| Snatch | | | | | | |
| Clean and Jerk | | | | | | |
| Total | | | | | | |
89 kg
| Snatch | | | | | | |
| Clean and Jerk | | | | | | |
| Total | | | | | | |
96 kg
| Snatch | 132 kg | Enrique Juanico | 29 July 2019 | Pan American Games | Lima, Peru | |
| Clean and Jerk | 157 kg | Enrique Juanico | 26 April 2019 | Pan American Championships | Guatemala City, Guatemala | |
| Total | 287 kg | Enrique Juanico | 29 July 2019 | Pan American Games | Lima, Peru | |
102 kg
| Snatch | | | | | | |
| Clean and Jerk | | | | | | |
| Total | | | | | | |
109 kg
| Snatch | 135 kg | Rodrigo Marra | 29 July 2019 | Pan American Games | Lima, Peru | |
| Clean and Jerk | 164 kg | Rodrigo Marra | 29 July 2019 | Pan American Games | Lima, Peru | |
| Total | 299 kg | Rodrigo Marra | 29 July 2019 | Pan American Games | Lima, Peru | |
+109 kg
| Snatch | | | | | | |
| Clean and Jerk | | | | | | |
| Total | | | | | | |

== Women ==
| Event | Record | Athlete | Date | Meet | Place | Ref |
45 kg
| Snatch | | | | | | |
| Clean and Jerk | | | | | | |
| Total | | | | | | |
49 kg
| Snatch | | | | | | |
| Clean and Jerk | | | | | | |
| Total | | | | | | |
55 kg
| Snatch | 73 kg | Sofía Rito | 28 July 2019 | Pan American Games | Lima, Peru | |
| Clean and Jerk | 90 kg | Sofía Rito | 28 July 2019 | Pan American Games | Lima, Peru | |
| Total | 163 kg | Sofía Rito | 28 July 2019 | Pan American Games | Lima, Peru | |
59 kg
| Snatch | | | | | | |
| Clean & Jerk | | | | | | |
| Total | | | | | | |
64 kg
| Snatch | 73 kg | Mercedes Portela | April 2019 | Pan American Championships | Guatemala City, Guatemala | |
| Clean and Jerk | 93 kg | Mercedes Portela | April 2019 | Pan American Championships | Guatemala City, Guatemala | |
| Total | 166 kg | Mercedes Portela | April 2019 | Pan American Championships | Guatemala City, Guatemala | |
71 kg
| Snatch | | | | | | |
| Clean and Jerk | | | | | | |
| Total | | | | | | |
76 kg
| Snatch | | | | | | |
| Clean and Jerk | | | | | | |
| Total | | | | | | |
81 kg
| Snatch | | | | | | |
| Clean and Jerk | | | | | | |
| Total | | | | | | |
87 kg
| Snatch | | | | | | |
| Clean and Jerk | | | | | | |
| Total | | | | | | |
+87 kg
| Snatch | | | | | | |
| Clean and Jerk | | | | | | |
| Total | | | | | | |
