= Weightlifting at the 2014 Asian Games – Women's 53 kg =

Women's 53 kg at the 2014 Asian Games
- Venue: Moonlight Festival Garden Venue
- Date: 21 September 2014
- Competitors: 13 from 9 nations

Medalists
gold medal	Hsu Shu-ching	Chinese Taipei
silver medal	Zulfiya Chinshanlo	Kazakhstan
bronze medal	Zhang Wanqiong	China

The women's 53 kilograms event at the 2014 Asian Games took place on 21 September 2014 at Moonlight Festival Garden Weightlifting Venue in Incheon, South Korea.

== Schedule ==
All times are Korea Standard Time (UTC+09:00)

Date	Time	Event
Sunday, 21 September 2014	12:00	Group B
Sunday, 21 September 2014	16:00	Group A

== Records ==
Prior to this competition, the existing world, Asian and Games records were as follows.

World Record	Snatch	Li Ping (CHN)	103 kg	Guangzhou, China	14 November 2010
World Record	Clean & Jerk	~~Zulfiya Chinshanlo (KAZ)~~; Zulfiya Chinshanlo (KAZ)	~~131 kg~~ 130 kg	~~London, United Kingdom~~; Paris, France	~~29 July 2012~~; 6 November 2011
World Record	Total	Li Ping (CHN)	230 kg	Guangzhou, China	14 November 2010
Asian Record	Snatch	Li Ping (CHN)	103 kg	Guangzhou, China	14 November 2010
Asian Record	Clean & Jerk	~~Zulfiya Chinshanlo (KAZ)~~; Zulfiya Chinshanlo (KAZ)	~~131 kg~~ 130 kg	~~London, United Kingdom~~; Paris, France	~~29 July 2012~~; 6 November 2011
Asian Record	Total	Li Ping (CHN)	230 kg	Guangzhou, China	14 November 2010
Games Record	Snatch	Li Ping (CHN)	103 kg	Guangzhou, China	14 November 2010
Games Record	Clean & Jerk	Li Ping (CHN)	127 kg	Guangzhou, China	14 November 2010
Games Record	Total	Li Ping (CHN)	230 kg	Guangzhou, China	14 November 2010

- Zulfiya Chinshanlo's world and Asian record was rescinded in 2016.

== Results ==
Legend

- NM — No mark

Rank	Athlete	Group	Body weight	Snatch (kg)				Clean & Jerk (kg)				Total
Rank	Athlete	Group	Body weight	1	2	3	Result	1	2	3	Result	Total
1st place, gold medalist(s)	Hsu Shu-ching (TPE)	A	52.64	98	~~101~~	101	101	124	127	132	132	233
2nd place, silver medalist(s)	Zulfiya Chinshanlo (KAZ)	A	52.49	93	~~96~~	96	96	125	132	~~137~~	132	228
3rd place, bronze medalist(s)	Zhang Wanqiong (CHN)	A	52.90	97	100	102	102	~~123~~	123	126	126	228
4	Marina Sisoeva (UZB)	A	52.53	~~88~~	~~89~~	89	89	112	117	~~120~~	117	206
5	Kim Su-ryon (PRK)	A	52.76	~~91~~	91	~~95~~	91	110	115	~~119~~	115	206
6	Sopita Tanasan (THA)	A	52.65	~~90~~	91	95	95	110	~~115~~	~~115~~	110	205
7	Kittima Sutanan (THA)	A	52.88	86	~~89~~	90	90	106	111	~~116~~	111	201
8	Hiromi Miyake (JPN)	A	49.56	83	85	87	87	~~107~~	107	110	110	197
9	Kanae Yagi (JPN)	B	52.47	80	82	~~84~~	82	102	105	108	108	190
10	Syarah Anggraini (INA)	B	52.61	82	~~85~~	~~85~~	82	~~101~~	~~101~~	101	101	183
11	Oyuuntungalagiin Bayartsetseg (MGL)	B	52.73	67	~~70~~	~~70~~	67	~~85~~	~~85~~	85	85	152
12	Baatartömöriin Ankhzayaa (MGL)	B	52.96	62	66	~~68~~	66	73	79	~~81~~	79	145
—	Citra Febrianti (INA)	B	52.03	~~83~~	~~83~~	~~83~~	—	—	—	—	—	NM

== New records ==
The following records were established during the competition.

Clean & Jerk	132	Zulfiya Chinshanlo (KAZ)	WR
Total	233	Hsu Shu-ching (TPE)	WR
