= 2013 World Weightlifting Championships – Women's 53 kg =

The women's competition in the –53 kg division was held on 21 October 2013 in Centennial Hall, Wrocław, Poland.

== Schedule ==
| Date | Time | Event |
|---|---|---|
| 21 October 2013 | 12:00 | Group B |
| 21 October 2013 | 16:55 | Group A |

== Medalists ==
| Event | Gold | | Silver | | Bronze | |
|---|---|---|---|---|---|---|
| Snatch | Li Yajun (CHN) | 100 kg | Sopita Tanasan (THA) | 91 kg | Iulia Paratova (UKR) | 90 kg |
| Clean & Jerk | Li Yajun (CHN) | 121 kg | Kittima Sutanan (THA) | 114 kg | Rusmeris Villar (COL) | 112 kg |
| Total | Li Yajun (CHN) | 221 kg | Sopita Tanasan (THA) | 203 kg | Kittima Sutanan (THA) | 200 kg |

== Records ==
Prior to this competition, the existing world records were as follows.

| World Record | Snatch | Li Ping (CHN) | 103 kg | Guangzhou, China | 14 November 2010 |
| World Record | Clean & Jerk | ~~Zulfiya Chinshanlo (KAZ)~~; Zulfiya Chinshanlo (KAZ) | ~~131 kg~~ 130 kg | ~~London, United Kingdom~~; Paris, France | ~~29 July 2012~~; 6 November 2011 |
| World Record | Total | Li Ping (CHN) | 230 kg | Guangzhou, China | 14 November 2010 |

- Zulfiya Chinshanlo's world record was rescinded in 2016.

== Results ==
| Rank | Athlete | Group | Body weight | Snatch (kg) | | | | Clean & Jerk (kg) | | | | Total |
| Rank | Athlete | Group | Body weight | 1 | 2 | 3 | Rank | 1 | 2 | 3 | Rank | Total |
|---|---|---|---|---|---|---|---|---|---|---|---|---|
| 1st place, gold medalist(s) | Li Yajun (CHN) | A | 52.39 | 95 | 100 | ~~104~~ | 1st place, gold medalist(s) | 115 | 120 | 121 | 1st place, gold medalist(s) | 221 |
| 2nd place, silver medalist(s) | Sopita Tanasan (THA) | A | 52.73 | 85 | 89 | 91 | 2nd place, silver medalist(s) | 109 | 112 | ~~113~~ | 4 | 203 |
| 3rd place, bronze medalist(s) | Kittima Sutanan (THA) | A | 52.88 | 86 | ~~90~~ | ~~90~~ | 5 | 110 | 114 | ~~118~~ | 2nd place, silver medalist(s) | 200 |
| 4 | Rusmeris Villar (COL) | A | 52.37 | 85 | ~~88~~ | ~~88~~ | 7 | ~~110~~ | 110 | 112 | 3rd place, bronze medalist(s) | 197 |
| 5 | Iulia Paratova (UKR) | A | 52.46 | 90 | ~~92~~ | ~~92~~ | 3rd place, bronze medalist(s) | 105 | ~~110~~ | ~~110~~ | 8 | 195 |
| 6 | Margarita Mercado (COL) | A | 52.90 | 87 | ~~90~~ | ~~90~~ | 4 | ~~108~~ | 108 | ~~111~~ | 6 | 195 |
| 7 | Marina Sisoeva (UZB) | B | 52.79 | 77 | 80 | 82 | 9 | 100 | 105 | 108 | 5 | 190 |
| 8 | Margarita Yelisseyeva (KAZ) | B | 51.77 | 80 | ~~85~~ | 85 | 6 | 97 | 101 | ~~104~~ | 9 | 186 |
| 9 | Hiromi Miyake (JPN) | A | 49.17 | 80 | ~~83~~ | ~~83~~ | 10 | 105 | ~~110~~ | ~~110~~ | 7 | 185 |
| 10 | Rosane Santos (BRA) | B | 52.61 | ~~80~~ | 80 | 85 | 8 | ~~92~~ | 92 | 97 | 10 | 182 |
| 11 | Sharifah Inani Najwa (MAS) | B | 52.60 | ~~72~~ | 72 | ~~76~~ | 13 | 90 | ~~95~~ | 95 | 11 | 167 |
| 12 | Amandeep Kaur (IND) | B | 52.52 | 70 | ~~73~~ | 73 | 12 | ~~90~~ | 90 | ~~93~~ | 12 | 163 |
| — | Ayşegül Çoban (TUR) | A | 52.70 | 77 | ~~80~~ | ~~80~~ | 11 | ~~111~~ | ~~111~~ | ~~111~~ | — | — |
| — | Lena Berntsson (SWE) | B | 52.55 | ~~70~~ | ~~70~~ | ~~70~~ | — | 85 | ~~88~~ | ~~88~~ | 13 | — |
| DQ | Cristina Iovu (AZE) | A | 52.73 | 93 | 96 | 100 | — | 113 | ~~120~~ | 121 | — | — |
