= 2014 World Weightlifting Championships – Women's 53 kg =

The women's 53 kilograms event at the 2014 World Weightlifting Championships was held on 10 November 2014 in Baluan Sholak Sports Palace, Almaty, Kazakhstan.

== Schedule ==
Date	Time	Event
10 November 2014	09:00	Group C
10 November 2014	13:00	Group B
10 November 2014	16:00	Group A

== Medalists ==
Event	Gold		Silver		Bronze	
Snatch	Hsu Shu-ching (TPE)	99 kg	Zulfiya Chinshanlo (KAZ)	98 kg	Li Yajun (CHN)	96 kg
Clean & Jerk	Zulfiya Chinshanlo (KAZ)	134 kg	Hsu Shu-ching (TPE)	119 kg	Li Yajun (CHN)	118 kg
Total	Zulfiya Chinshanlo (KAZ)	232 kg	Hsu Shu-ching (TPE)	218 kg	Li Yajun (CHN)	214 kg

== Records ==
Prior to this competition, the existing world records were as follows.

World Record	Snatch	Li Ping (CHN)	103 kg	Guangzhou, China	14 November 2010
World Record	Clean & Jerk	Zulfiya Chinshanlo (KAZ)	132 kg	Incheon, South Korea	21 September 2014
World Record	Total	Hsu Shu-ching (TPE)	233 kg	Incheon, South Korea	21 September 2014

== Results ==
Rank	Athlete	Group	Body weight	Snatch (kg)				Clean & Jerk (kg)				Total
Rank	Athlete	Group	Body weight	1	2	3	Rank	1	2	3	Rank	Total
1st place, gold medalist(s)	Zulfiya Chinshanlo (KAZ)	A	52.95	95	~~98~~	98	2nd place, silver medalist(s)	127	133	134	1st place, gold medalist(s)	232
2nd place, silver medalist(s)	Hsu Shu-ching (TPE)	A	52.50	95	~~99~~	99	1st place, gold medalist(s)	119	~~127~~	~~127~~	2nd place, silver medalist(s)	218
3rd place, bronze medalist(s)	Li Yajun (CHN)	A	52.55	96	~~100~~	~~100~~	3rd place, bronze medalist(s)	115	117	118	3rd place, bronze medalist(s)	214
4	Sopita Tanasan (THA)	A	52.66	90	95	~~99~~	4	110	113	~~116~~	5	208
5	Iulia Paratova (UKR)	A	52.40	~~90~~	~~91~~	91	5	109	~~114~~	~~114~~	7	200
6	Rusmeris Villar (COL)	A	52.60	85	87	~~88~~	7	110	113	~~115~~	4	200
7	Boyanka Kostova (AZE)	B	52.66	85	89	91	6	105	~~109~~	109	8	200
8	Hiromi Miyake (JPN)	A	49.45	83	~~85~~	85	10	107	110	112	6	197
9	Kanae Yagi (JPN)	B	52.09	81	84	86	9	104	106	108	9	194
10	Yuderqui Contreras (DOM)	A	52.85	87	~~90~~	~~90~~	8	105	~~108~~	~~108~~	13	192
11	Ana Margot Lemos (COL)	B	52.46	82	84	~~86~~	11	105	~~108~~	~~109~~	12	189
12	Basma Ibrahim (EGY)	B	52.32	~~77~~	77	81	13	99	103	105	11	186
13	Maya Ivanova (BUL)	B	52.85	80	~~83~~	~~83~~	19	100	~~105~~	105	14	185
14	Julia Schwarzbach (GER)	B	52.72	79	~~82~~	~~82~~	21	100	103	~~106~~	15	182
15	Cho Yu-mi (KOR)	B	51.33	~~81~~	~~81~~	81	12	100	~~103~~	~~103~~	17	181
16	Syarah Anggraini (INA)	B	52.44	77	81	~~83~~	14	96	100	~~104~~	18	181
17	Ayşegül Çoban (TUR)	A	52.62	~~75~~	75	~~79~~	25	106	~~110~~	~~110~~	10	181
18	Giorgia Russo (ITA)	B	51.98	75	77	~~79~~	23	98	101	~~103~~	16	178
19	Erika Yamasaki (AUS)	C	52.69	75	77	79	20	95	99	~~102~~	20	178
20	Atenery Hernández (ESP)	C	52.25	77	~~80~~	80	17	94	97	~~100~~	22	177
21	Anna Govelyan (ARM)	B	52.82	77	~~80~~	80	18	93	~~95~~	95	24	175
22	Rebeka Koha (LAT)	C	52.04	76	78	80	16	92	94	~~96~~	25	174
23	Jessica Ruel (CAN)	C	52.78	76	78	~~80~~	22	93	96	~~97~~	23	174
24	Manon Lorentz (FRA)	C	50.13	~~77~~	77	80	15	92	~~95~~	~~95~~	26	172
25	María Sierra (VEN)	C	52.63	68	72	~~74~~	26	94	98	~~101~~	21	170
26	Swati Singh (IND)	C	52.84	~~74~~	74	76	24	92	~~97~~	~~99~~	27	168
27	Gulchin Alizada (AZE)	C	52.26	~~70~~	70	~~75~~	27	85	90	~~95~~	28	160
28	Tegan Napper (AUS)	C	52.78	67	~~70~~	~~70~~	29	85	87	~~89~~	29	154
29	Sini Kukkonen (FIN)	C	52.16	~~65~~	66	68	28	81	~~85~~	85	30	153
30	Oyuuntungalagiin Bayartsetseg (MGL)	C	52.29	65	~~70~~	~~70~~	30	83	~~87~~	~~87~~	31	148
31	Baatartömöriin Ankhzayaa (MGL)	C	52.42	63	~~67~~	~~67~~	32	75	~~80~~	80	32	143
32	Veronika Věžníková (CZE)	C	52.04	60	63	~~66~~	31	72	76	~~78~~	33	139
—	Rosane Santos (BRA)	B	52.55	~~83~~	~~86~~	~~86~~	—	96	100	~~102~~	19	—
DQ	Marina Sisoeva (UZB)	A	52.84	85	89	92	—	110	115	118	—	—

== New records ==
Clean & Jerk	133 kg	Zulfiya Chinshanlo (KAZ)	WR
Clean & Jerk	134 kg	Zulfiya Chinshanlo (KAZ)	WR
