= 2022 World Weightlifting Championships – Women's 55 kg =

The women's 55 kilograms competition at the 2022 World Weightlifting Championships was held on 7 December 2022.

== Schedule ==
Date	Time	Event
7 December 2022	14:00	Group B
7 December 2022	19:00	Group A

== Medalists ==
Event	Gold		Silver		Bronze	
Snatch	Hidilyn Diaz (PHI)	93 kg	Ana López Ferrer (MEX)	90 kg	Rosalba Morales (COL)	89 kg
Clean & Jerk	Hidilyn Diaz (PHI)	114 kg	Rosalba Morales (COL)	110 kg	Shoely Mego (PER)	109 kg
Total	Hidilyn Diaz (PHI)	207 kg	Rosalba Morales (COL)	199 kg	Ana López Ferrer (MEX)	198 kg

== Records ==
Prior to this competition, the existing world records were as follows.

World Record	Snatch	Li Yajun (CHN)	102 kg	Ashgabat, Turkmenistan	3 November 2018
World Record	Clean & Jerk	Liao Qiuyun (CHN)	129 kg	Pattaya, Thailand	20 September 2019
World Record	Total	Liao Qiuyun (CHN)	227 kg	Pattaya, Thailand	20 September 2019

== Results ==
Rank	Athlete	Group	Snatch (kg)				Clean & Jerk (kg)				Total
Rank	Athlete	Group	1	2	3	Rank	1	2	3	Rank	Total
1st place, gold medalist(s)	Hidilyn Diaz (PHI)	A	90	93	~~96~~	1st place, gold medalist(s)	114	~~117~~	~~121~~	1st place, gold medalist(s)	207
2nd place, silver medalist(s)	Rosalba Morales (COL)	A	86	~~89~~	89	3rd place, bronze medalist(s)	110	~~115~~	~~115~~	2nd place, silver medalist(s)	199
3rd place, bronze medalist(s)	Ana Gabriela López (MEX)	A	90	~~94~~	~~94~~	2nd place, silver medalist(s)	105	108	~~110~~	5	198
4	Andreea Cotruţa (ROU)	A	87	~~90~~	~~90~~	4	107	~~112~~	~~112~~	6	194
5	Shayla Moore (USA)	A	86	~~89~~	~~89~~	6	108	~~111~~	~~112~~	4	194
6	Nigora Abdullaeva (UZB)	A	83	86	~~89~~	7	100	~~105~~	106	7	192
7	Shoely Mego (PER)	A	~~83~~	~~83~~	83	10	~~108~~	~~108~~	109	3rd place, bronze medalist(s)	192
8	Josée Gallant (CAN)	B	82	84	86	5	~~103~~	~~103~~	104	14	190
9	Chen Guan-ling (TPE)	A	~~85~~	85	~~88~~	8	105	~~110~~	~~110~~	8	190
10	Irene Borrego (MEX)	A	~~85~~	85	~~88~~	9	105	~~108~~	~~109~~	9	190
11	Juliana Klarisa (INA)	A	79	~~82~~	82	13	103	105	~~109~~	10	187
12	Catrin Jones (GBR)	B	~~82~~	82	~~84~~	11	~~101~~	101	104	12	186
13	Rose Harvey (CAN)	B	78	81	~~83~~	14	99	102	104	13	185
14	Jennifer Hernández (ECU)	B	77	80	—	15	95	104	~~107~~	11	184
15	Katrine Bruhn (DEN)	A	79	82	~~84~~	12	101	~~104~~	~~105~~	15	183
16	Victoria Grenni (ESA)	B	73	~~76~~	76	18	91	95	~~98~~	17	171
17	Olga Shapiro (ISR)	B	75	~~78~~	78	16	88	91	~~93~~	18	169
18	Issi Agrait (PUR)	B	72	~~77~~	77	17	80	90	~~95~~	19	167
19	Iris Leguizamón (PAR)	B	~~70~~	~~70~~	70	20	90	95	~~100~~	16	165
20	Roni Shaham (ISR)	B	~~71~~	~~71~~	71	19	~~85~~	85	89	20	160
—	Enkhbaataryn Enkhtamir (MGL)	A	~~86~~	~~87~~	~~87~~	—	—	—	—	—	—
