= Amy Williams (weightlifter) =

English weightlifter

Personal information
- Birth name: Amy Louise Williams
- Nationality: British
- Born: 28 February 1992 (age 33)
- Height: 1.55 m (5 ft 1 in)
- Weight: 54 kg (119 lb)

Sport
- Country: Great Britain
- Sport: Weightlifting
- Event: –55kg
- Club: Wisdom 4 Weightlifting

Amy Louise Williams (born 28 February 1992) is an English weightlifter.

== Early career ==
Williams started with CrossFit in 2014 at the age of 22. Later she change to Olympic weightlifting. Williams participated in her first competition in 2015.

== Major results ==
Year	Venue	Weight	Snatch (kg)				Clean & Jerk (kg)				Total	Rank
Year	Venue	Weight	1	2	3	Rank	1	2	3	Rank	Total	Rank
Representing Great Britain
World Championships
2019	Pattaya, Thailand	55 kg	73	76	~~78~~	35	94	97	~~99~~	30	173	31
2018	Ashgabat, Turkmenistan	55 kg	71	~~74~~	74	37	92	96	~~100~~	32	170	35
European Championships
2019	(Georgia (country)) Batumi, Georgia	55 kg	72	75	~~77~~	15	93	~~97~~	98	13	173	13
2018	Bucharest, Romania	53 kg	70	~~73~~	75	9	90	~~94~~	~~94~~	12	165	11
