= Irene Borrego =

Mexican weightlifter (born 2001)

Personal information
- Full name: Irene Esmeralda Borrego Palacios
- Born: 3 November 2001 (age 24)

Sport
- Country: Mexico
- Sport: Weightlifting
- Weight class: 55 kg
Medal record
Women's weightlifting
Representing Mexico
World Championships
Bronze medal – third place	2023 Riyadh	55 kg
Junior Pan American Games
Silver medal – second place	2021 Cali-Valle	55 kg

Irene Esmeralda Borrego Palacios (born 3 November 2001) is a Mexican weightlifter. She won the bronze medal in the women's 55 kg event at the 2023 World Weightlifting Championships held in Riyadh, Saudi Arabia.

In 2021, Borrego won the silver medal in the women's 55 kg event at the Junior Pan American Games held in Cali and Valle, Colombia. She won the gold medal in the women's 55 kg Snatch event at the 2022 Pan American Weightlifting Championships held in Bogotá, Colombia. In that same year, she competed in the women's 55 kg event at the World Weightlifting Championships held in Bogotá, Colombia.

== Achievements ==
Year	Venue	Weight	Snatch (kg)				Clean & Jerk (kg)				Total	Rank
Year	Venue	Weight	1	2	3	Rank	1	2	3	Rank	Total	Rank
World Championships
2022	Bogotá, Colombia	55 kg	~~85~~	85	~~88~~	9	105	~~108~~	~~109~~	9	190	10
2023	Riyadh, Saudi Arabia	55 kg	85	89	~~92~~	3rd place, bronze medalist(s)	106	~~110~~	110	4	199	3rd place, bronze medalist(s)
Pan American Championships
2022	Bogotá, Colombia	55 kg	84	86	~~88~~	1st place, gold medalist(s)	103	~~107~~	~~107~~	6	189	4
Junior Pan American Games
2021	Cali, Colombia	55 kg	82	85	~~87~~	1	103	106	~~108~~	2	191	2nd place, silver medalist(s)
