= Rosalba Morales =

Colombian weightlifter (born 1998)

Personal information
- Full name: Rosalba Estela Morales Del Águila
- Born: 14 November 1998 (age 27)

Sport
- Country: Colombia
- Sport: Weightlifting
- Weight class: 55 kg; 59 kg; 64 kg
Medal record
Representing Colombia
Women's weightlifting
World Championships
Silver medal – second place	2022 Bogotá	55 kg
Pan American Championships
Bronze medal – third place	2024 Caracas	64 kg
Central American and Caribbean Games
Gold medal – first place	2023 San Salvador	55 kg S
Gold medal – first place	2023 San Salvador	55 kg CJ
South American Games
Gold medal – first place	2022 Asunción	55 kg
Bolivarian Games
Silver medal – second place	2024 Ayacucho	59 kg

Rosalba Estela Morales Del Águila (born 14 November 1998) is a Colombian weightlifter. She won the silver medal in the women's 55 kg event at the 2022 World Weightlifting Championships held in Bogotá, Colombia. She won the gold medal in women's 55 kg event at the 2022 South American Games held in Asunción, Paraguay.

In 2024, she won the bronze medal in the women's 64 kg event at the Pan American Weightlifting Championships held in Caracas, Venezuela. She won the silver medal in her event at the 2024 Bolivarian Games held in Ayacucho, Peru.

== Achievements ==
Year	Venue	Weight	Snatch (kg)				Clean & Jerk (kg)				Total	Rank
Year	Venue	Weight	1	2	3	Rank	1	2	3	Rank	Total	Rank
Representing Colombia
World Championships
2022	Bogotá, Colombia	55 kg	86	~~89~~	89	3rd place, bronze medalist(s)	110	~~115~~	~~115~~	2nd place, silver medalist(s)	199	2nd place, silver medalist(s)
2023	Riyadh, Saudi Arabia	55 kg	85	~~88~~	~~88~~	9	110	~~113~~	~~113~~	3rd place, bronze medalist(s)	195	6
Pan American Championships
2024	Caracas, Venezuela	64 kg	91	94	~~97~~	3rd place, bronze medalist(s)	115	~~121~~	~~122~~	3rd place, bronze medalist(s)	209	3rd place, bronze medalist(s)
Central American and Caribbean Games
2023	San Salvador, El Salvador	55 kg	83	~~86~~	87	1st place, gold medalist(s)	105	110	~~117~~	1st place, gold medalist(s)	—N/a	—N/a
South American Games
2022	Asunción, Paraguay	55 kg	83	86	89	1	108	112	~~117~~	1	201	1st place, gold medalist(s)
Bolivarian Games
2024	Ayacucho, Peru	59 kg	90	92	~~96~~	2	113	~~118~~	~~118~~	3	205	2nd place, silver medalist(s)
Junior World Championships
2017	Tokyo, Japan	58 kg	80	83	85	8	107	~~110~~	110	5	195	5
2018	Tashkent, Uzbekistan	58 kg	83	~~86~~	~~86~~	6	109	112	~~114~~	2nd place, silver medalist(s)	195	5
Youth World Championships
2015	Lima, Peru	58 kg	~~75~~	75	~~78~~	11	95	~~100~~	~~100~~	12	170	12
