= Weightlifting at the 2012 Summer Olympics – Women's 53 kg =

Women's 53 kg at the Games of the XXX Olympiad
- Venue: ExCeL London
- Date: 29 July 2012
- Competitors: 18 from 17 nations

Medalists
1st place, gold medalist(s)		Hsu Shu-ching	Chinese Taipei
2nd place, silver medalist(s)		Citra Febrianti	Indonesia
3rd place, bronze medalist(s)		Iulia Paratova	Ukraine

The women's 53 kilograms weightlifting event at the 2012 Summer Olympics in London, United Kingdom, took place at ExCeL London on 29 July.

== Summary ==
Total score was the sum of the lifter's best result in each of the snatch and the clean and jerk, with three lifts allowed for each lift. In case of a tie, the lighter lifter won; if still tied, the lifter who took the fewest attempts to achieve the total score won. Lifters without a valid snatch score did not perform the clean and jerk.

The original gold medalist, Zulfiya Chinshanlo of Kazakhstan was disqualified from the Games on 27 October 2016, and her medal, results and records stripped. Re-analysis of Chinshanlo's samples from London 2012 had resulted in a positive test for the prohibited substances oxandrolone and stanozolol, both anabolic steroids.

Cristina Iovu originally won the bronze medal, but on 27 July 2016, the International Weightlifting Federation announced that Iovu failed her re-tested 2012 Olympics sample. She tested positive for Dehydrochlormethyltestosterone (S1.1 Anabolic agents). In November 2016, she was stripped of her 2012 Olympic medal.

== Schedule ==
All times are British Summer Time (UTC+01:00)

Date	Time	Event
29 July 2012	12:30	Group B
29 July 2012	15:30	Group A

== Records ==
Prior to this competition, the existing world and Olympic records were as follows.

World Record	Snatch	Li Ping (CHN)	103 kg	Guangzhou, China	14 November 2010
World Record	Clean & Jerk	Zulfiya Chinshanlo (KAZ)	130 kg	Paris, France	6 November 2011
World Record	Total	Li Ping (CHN)	230 kg	Guangzhou, China	14 November 2010
Olympic Record	Snatch	Yang Xia (CHN)	100 kg	Sydney, Australia	18 September 2000
Olympic Record	Clean & Jerk	Prapawadee Jaroenrattanatarakoon (THA)	126 kg	Beijing, China	10 August 2008
Olympic Record	Total	Yang Xia (CHN)	225 kg	Sydney, Australia	18 September 2000

== Results ==
Rank	Athlete	Group	Body weight	Snatch (kg)				Clean & Jerk (kg)				Total
Rank	Athlete	Group	Body weight	1	2	3	Result	1	2	3	Result	Total
1st place, gold medalist(s)	Hsu Shu-ching (TPE)	A	52.41	91	94	96	96	120	~~123~~	123	123	219
2nd place, silver medalist(s)	Citra Febrianti (INA)	A	52.53	88	91	~~94~~	91	108	112	115	115	206
3rd place, bronze medalist(s)	Iulia Paratova (UKR)	A	52.43	91	~~94~~	~~94~~	91	105	~~108~~	108	108	199
4	Rusmeris Villar (COL)	A	52.59	~~87~~	87	~~90~~	87	105	109	~~112~~	109	196
5	Aleksandra Klejnowska (POL)	A	52.67	83	84	~~86~~	84	108	112	~~113~~	112	196
6	Nguyễn Thị Thúy (VIE)	B	52.23	80	~~84~~	85	85	~~110~~	110	~~115~~	110	195
7	Yu Weili (HKG)	B	52.95	~~86~~	86	90	90	105	~~110~~	~~110~~	105	195
8	Inmara Henríquez (VEN)	B	52.84	78	~~81~~	81	81	107	110	113	113	194
9	Julia Rohde (GER)	B	52.45	83	85	~~87~~	85	105	108	~~110~~	108	193
10	Kanae Yagi (JPN)	B	52.36	~~82~~	82	~~85~~	82	105	~~109~~	109	109	191
11	Joanna Łochowska (POL)	A	52.57	84	~~87~~	~~87~~	84	104	107	~~110~~	107	191
12	Dika Toua (PNG)	B	52.48	75	~~79~~	79	79	95	~~100~~	~~100~~	95	174
13	Helena Wong (SIN)	B	52.31	55	59	61	61	67	71	73	73	134
—	Yuderqui Contreras (DOM)	A	52.95	~~94~~	~~94~~	~~94~~	—	—	—	—	—	—
—	Zhou Jun (CHN)	B	52.80	~~95~~	~~95~~	~~95~~	—	—	—	—	—	—
—	Aylin Daşdelen (TUR)	A	52.91	~~91~~	~~91~~	91	91	~~124~~	~~129~~	—	—	—
DQ	Zulfiya Chinshanlo (KAZ)	A	52.70	~~92~~	92	95	95	125	131	~~135~~	131	~~226~~
DQ	Cristina Iovu (MDA)	A	52.79	95	~~99~~	99	99	115	120	~~125~~	120	~~219~~

== New records ==
Clean & Jerk	~~131 kg~~	~~Zulfiya Chinshanlo (KAZ)~~	~~WR~~
Total	~~226 kg~~	~~Zulfiya Chinshanlo (KAZ)~~	~~OR~~
