= Lunbei =

Rural township in Yunlin, Taiwan

Coordinates: 23°46′44″N 120°19′59″E

Lunbei Township 崙背鄉
- Rural township
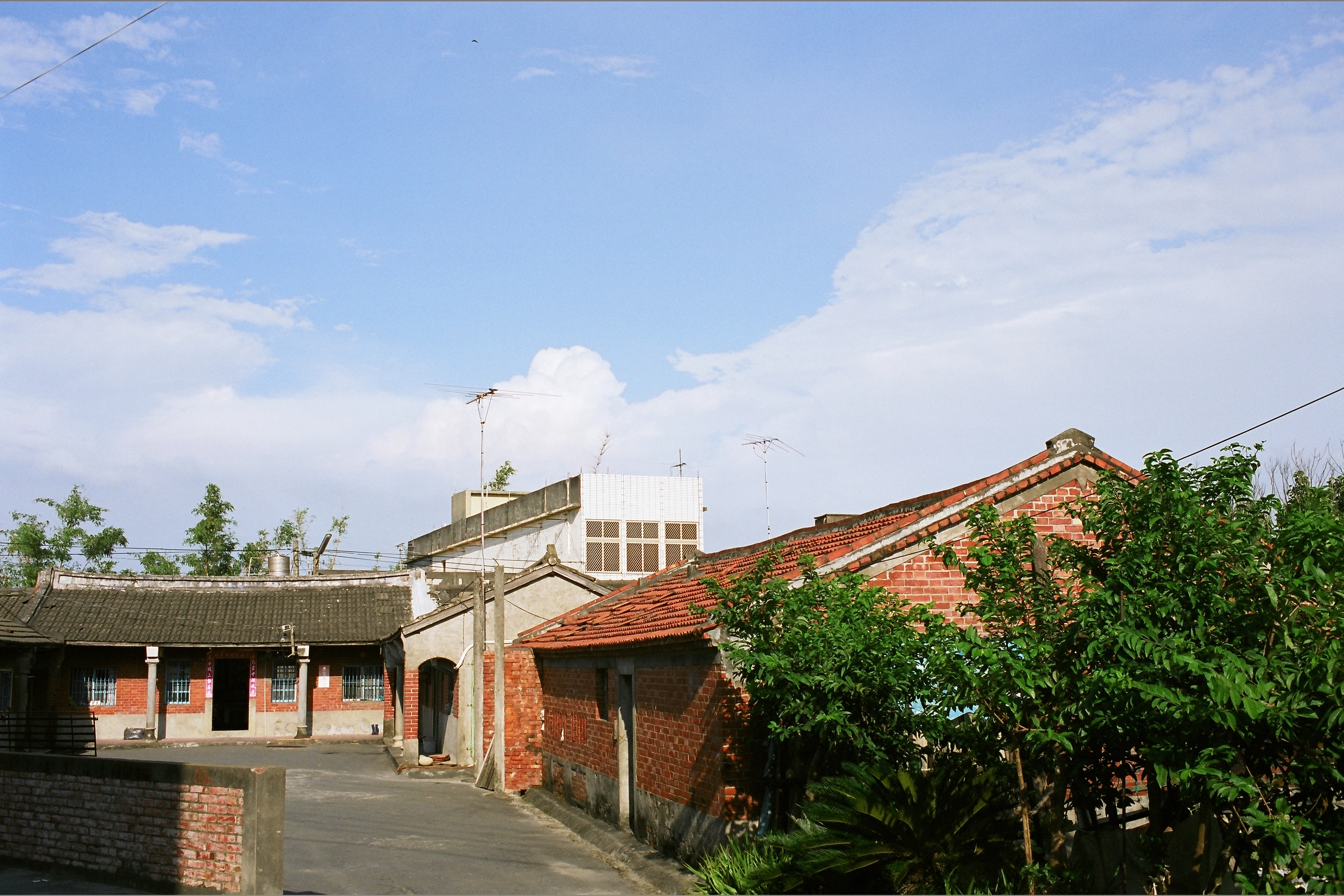

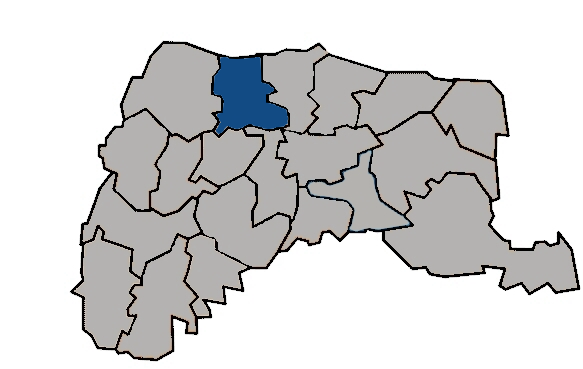
- Lunbei Township in Yunlin County
- Location: Yunlin County, Taiwan

Area
  - Total: 58 km^{2} (22 sq mi)

Population (June 2024)
  - Total: 22,777
  - Density: 390/km^{2} (1,000/sq mi)

Lunbei Township (Chinese: 崙背鄉; pinyin: Lúnbèi Xiāng) is a rural township in Yunlin County, Taiwan.

== Geography ==
Lunbei lies on the alluvial plain of the Zhuoshui River at 7–20 m (23–66 ft) above sea level. As of June 2024, it has a population total of 22,777 people, and an area of 58.4840 square kilometers.

== Administrative divisions ==
Tungming, Xirong, Nanyang, Lunqian, Luocuo, Gangwei, Aquan, Wukui, Dayou, Fengrong, Caohu, Jiuzhuang, Shuiwei and Fangnan Village.

== Economy ==
The township grows watermelon and cantaloupe all year round. In 2002, the township had 58 dairy farms raising about 10,000 cows with several tones of annual milk production. The total annual dairy product production is around NT$500 to NT$600 million. The township also produces chicken from its farms.

== Tourist attractions ==
- Zhaoan Hakka Cultural Hall

== Notable natives ==
- Hsu Shu-ching, weightlifter
