= Kristina Şermetowa =

Turkmen weightlifter (born 1993)

Kristina Shermetova
Personal information
- Native name: Kristina Şermetowa
- Born: 25 May 1993 (age 33) Ashgabat, Turkmenistan
- Height: 1.73 m (5 ft 8 in)
- Weight: 55 kg (121 lb)

Sport
- Country: Turkmenistan
- Sport: Weightlifting
- Event: 55 kg
Medal record
Women's weightlifting
Representing Turkmenistan
World Championships
Silver medal – second place	2017 Anaheim	53 kg
Asian Games
Silver medal – second place	2018 Jakarta	53 kg
Islamic Solidarity Games
Silver medal – second place	2021 Konya	55 kg
Asian Indoor and Martial Arts Games
Bronze medal – third place	2017 Ashgabat	53 kg
- Updated on 11 November 2018

Kristina Shermetova (Turkmen: Kristina Şermetowa; born 25 May 1993 in Ashgabat) is a Turkmen weightlifter. Her best results was a silver medal at the 2017 World Weightlifting Championships in Anaheim.

== Biography ==
She was born on 25 May 1993, in Turkmenistan capital city Ashgabat. Since childhood, she has been engaged in sports and dancing. She started weightlifting in 2007, because of a friend of her father opened a weightlifting school for girls in Ashgabat.

The first coach is Armen Stepanyan.

== Career ==
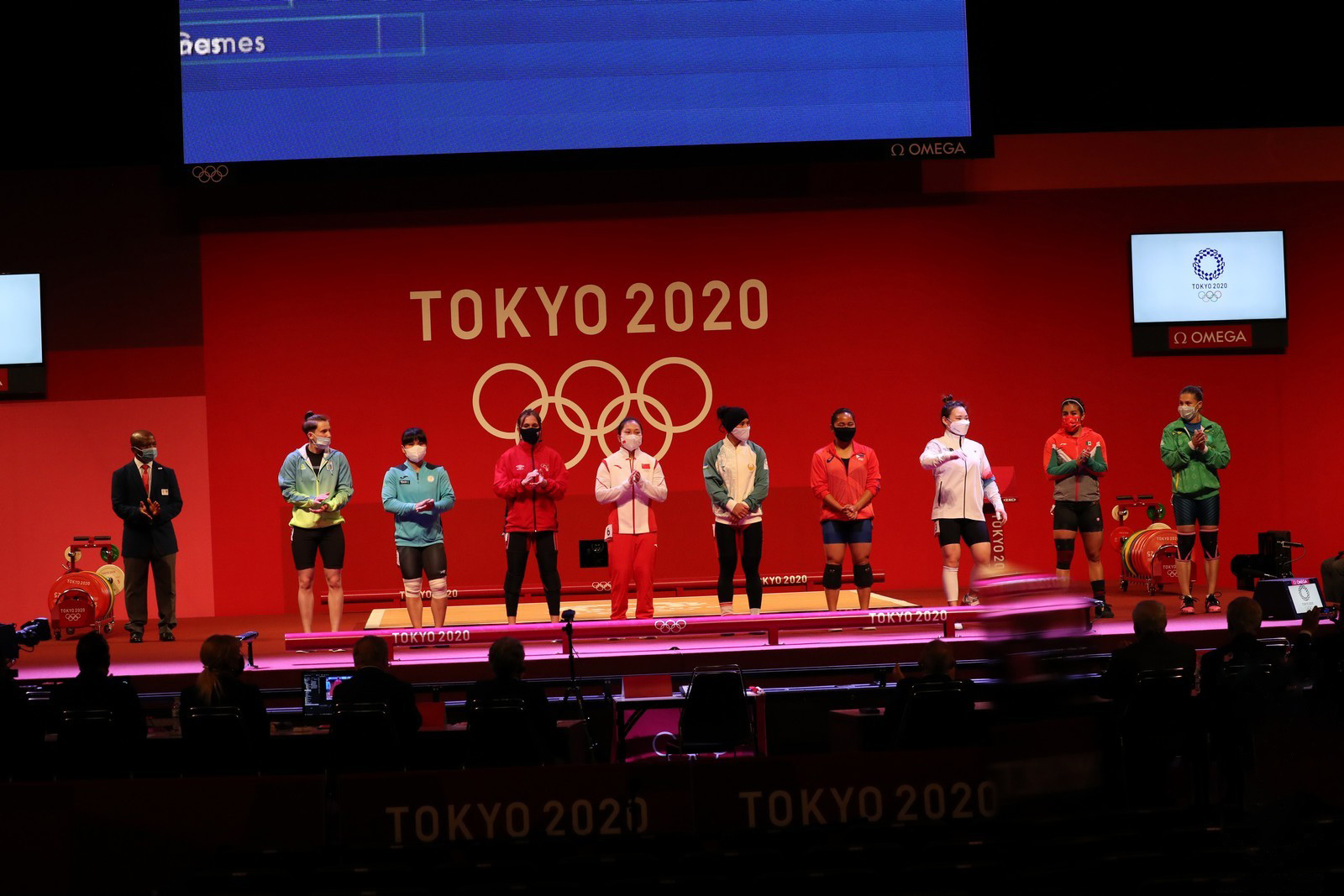
Kristina Şermetowa at the 2020 Summer Olympics (first on the right)

The first international success in her career was the bronze medal of the 2009 Asian Youth Weightlifting Championship in the category up to 48 kg.

Due to injuries, she missed 2015 and 2016 seasons.

2017 turned out to be successful for Kristina Shermetova. The athlete became the third at the 2017 Asian Weightlifting Championships in the category up to 53 kg, and at the 2017 World Weightlifting Championships in Anaheim she won silver.

In July 2021, she represented Turkmenistan at the 2020 Summer Olympics in Tokyo, Japan. She finished in 6th place in the women's 55 kg event.

== Major results ==
Year	Venue	Weight	Snatch (kg)				Clean & Jerk (kg)				Total	Rank
Year	Venue	Weight	1	2	3	Rank	1	2	3	Rank	Total	Rank
Representing Turkmenistan
Olympic Games
2021	Tokyo, Japan	55 kg	90	~~93~~	~~93~~	5	111	115	~~117~~	5	205	6
World Championships
2019	Pattaya, Thailand	55 kg	~~83~~	83	86	14	107	~~110~~	110	12	196	11
2018	Ashgabat, Turkmenistan	55 kg	90	93	~~95~~	9	113	117	~~120~~	7	210	8
2017	Anaheim, United States	53 kg	88	~~91~~	91	3rd place, bronze medalist(s)	109	111	113	3rd place, bronze medalist(s)	204	2nd place, silver medalist(s)
Asian Games
2018	Jakarta, Indonesia	53 kg	88	91	93	1	110	113	~~116~~	3	206	2nd place, silver medalist(s)
Asian Championships
2022	Manama, Bahrain	55 kg	~~82~~	~~83~~	83	6	~~104~~	~~105~~	~~107~~	—	—	—
2021	Tashkent, Uzbekistan	55 kg	88	~~90~~	~~90~~	6	110	~~113~~	~~113~~	7	198	7
2019	Ningbo, China	55 kg	63	68	~~72~~	12	98	104	—	6	172	8
2017	Ashgabat, Turkmenistan	53 kg	78	~~81~~	~~81~~	5	100	104	~~106~~	3rd place, bronze medalist(s)	182	3rd place, bronze medalist(s)
2012	Pyeongtaek, South Korea	58 kg	77	81	83	8	95	~~100~~	100	8	183	8
Islamic Solidarity Games
2022	Konya, Turkey	55 kg	85	87	89	1st place, gold medalist(s)	103	105	~~111~~	2nd place, silver medalist(s)	194	2nd place, silver medalist(s)
