= Zhang Wanqiong =

Chinese weightlifter (born 1994)

Personal information
- Nationality: Chinese
- Born: 21 January 1994 (age 32)
- Weight: 54.80 kg (121 lb)

Sport
- Country: China
- Sport: Weightlifting
- Event: –55 kg
- Club: Guangdong Province
Medal record
Representing China
World Championships
Silver medal – second place	2018 Ashgabat	–55 kg
Silver medal – second place	2019 Pattaya	–55 kg
Asian Games
Bronze medal – third place	2014 Incheon	–53 kg
Asian Championships
Silver medal – second place	2016 Tashkent	–53 kg
IWF World Cup
Gold medal – first place	2019 Tianjin	–55 kg

Zhang Wanqiong (born 21 January 1994) is a Chinese weightlifter.

She participated at the 2018 World Weightlifting Championships, winning a medal.

== Major results ==
Year	Venue	Weight	Snatch (kg)				Clean & Jerk (kg)				Total	Rank
Year	Venue	Weight	1	2	3	Rank	1	2	3	Rank	Total	Rank
World Championships
2018	Ashgabat, Turkmenistan	55 kg	96	99	101 WR	2nd place, silver medalist(s)	118	122	124	1st place, gold medalist(s)	225	2nd place, silver medalist(s)
2019	Pattaya, Thailand	55 kg	96	~~99~~	99	1st place, gold medalist(s)	118	123	~~126~~	2nd place, silver medalist(s)	222	2nd place, silver medalist(s)
Asian Games
2014	Incheon, South Korea	53 kg	97	100	102	1	~~123~~	123	126	3	228	3rd place, bronze medalist(s)
Asian Championships
2016	Tashkent, Uzbekistan	53 kg	85	90	95	2nd place, silver medalist(s)	113	116	~~121~~	3rd place, bronze medalist(s)	211	2nd place, silver medalist(s)
IWF World Cup
2019	Tianjin, China	55 kg	~~96~~	~~96~~	96	1st place, gold medalist(s)	116	~~121~~	~~121~~	1st place, gold medalist(s)	212	1st place, gold medalist(s)
