= Zhaoan Hakka Cultural Hall =

Cultural center in Lunbei, Yunlin, Taiwan

- 詔安客家文化館
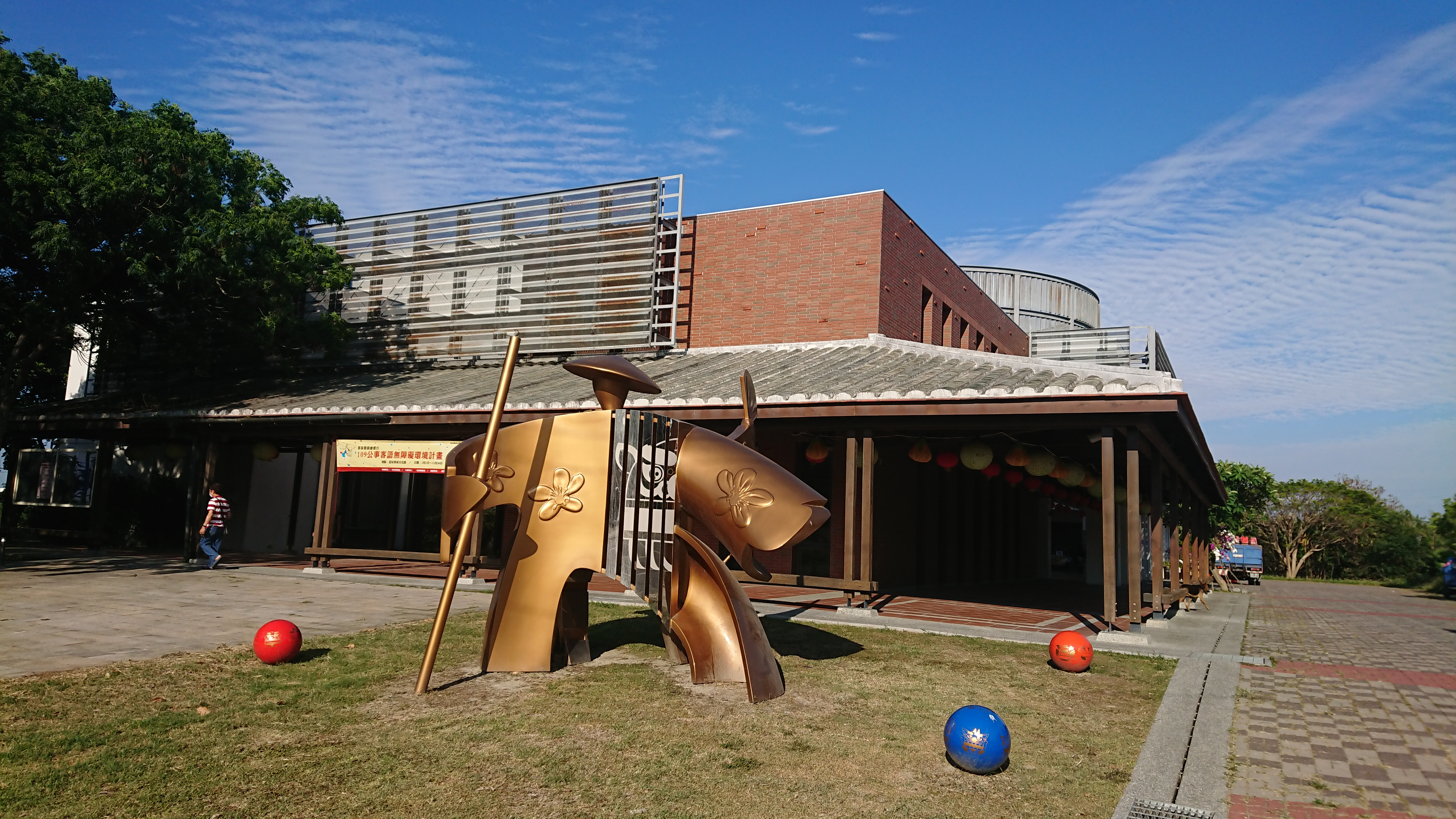
- Interactive map of Zhaoan Hakka Cultural Hall
- Location: Lunbei, Yunlin County, Taiwan
- Coordinates: 23°45′49.7″N 120°21′18.3″E
- Type: cultural center
- Acreage: 0.8 hectare

Construction
- Groundbreaking: 2011
- Built: 2017
- Cost: NT$100 million
- Architect: Kuo Jun-pei Architectural Firm

The Zhaoan Hakka Cultural Hall (traditional Chinese: 詔安客家文化館; simplified Chinese: 诏安客家文化馆; pinyin: Zhào'ān Kèjiā Wénhuàguǎn) is a cultural center in Lunbei Township, Yunlin County, Taiwan.

== History ==
The idea of the construction of the center in Lunbei Township because of a large population of Zhao'an Hakka people in the township and surrounding areas. In 2006, the Hakka Affairs Council began the plan for subsiding the construction of Zhaoan Hakka Cultural Hall. The construction of the center began in 2011 and was completed in 2017.

== Architecture ==
The center was designed by Kuo Jun-pei Architectural Firm with Hakka architectural style forming a circular house. The center spans over an area of 0.8 hectare and consists of two floors. The ground floor is used for normal activities and the upper floor is used for specific activities. Dynamic activities are held at the atrium and outdoor plaza. It was constructed with a total cost of almost NT$100 million.

== Activities ==
The center hosts various Hakka-related activities and event, such as teaching, training, seminars and workshops. In 2017, it organized the 2017 Zhaoan Fire Torch Hakka Village Marching Hakka Cultural Festival.

== See also ==
- List of tourist attractions in Taiwan
