= Ana Gabriela López =

Mexican weightlifter (born 1994)

Personal information
- Full name: Ana Gabriela López Ferrer
- Nickname: Pony
- Born: 22 September 1994 (age 31) Xalapa, Veracruz, Mexico
- Education: Sonora Institute of Technology

Sport
- Country: Mexico
- Sport: Weightlifting
- Weight class: 55 kg
Medal record
Women's weightlifting
Representing Mexico
World Championships
| Bronze medal – third place | 2022 Bogotá | 55 kg |
Pan American Games
| Bronze medal – third place | 2019 Lima | 55 kg |
Pan American Championships
| Gold medal – first place | 2020 Santo Domingo | 55 kg |
| Gold medal – first place | 2024 Caracas | 49 kg |
| Bronze medal – third place | 2019 Guatemala City | 55 kg |

Ana Gabriela López Ferrer (born 22 September 1994) is a Mexican weightlifter. She won the bronze medal in the women's 55 kg event at the 2022 World Weightlifting Championships held in Bogotá, Colombia. She also won the bronze medal in the women's 55 kg event at the 2019 Pan American Games held in Lima, Peru. She represented Mexico at the 2020 Summer Olympics in Tokyo, Japan.

== Career ==
Ana Gabriela López studied at the Sonora Institute of Technology in Ciudad Obregon, Mexico.

In 2017, she competed in the women's 53 kg event at the World Weightlifting Championships held in Anaheim, United States. At the 2018 World Weightlifting Championships in Ashgabat, Turkmenistan, she competed in the women's 55 kg event. She also competed in the women's 55 kg event at the 2019 World Weightlifting Championships held in Pattaya, Thailand.

She represented Mexico at the 2020 Summer Olympics in Tokyo, Japan. She finished in 9th place in the women's 55 kg event.

In 2024, she won the gold medal in the women's 49 kg event at the Pan American Weightlifting Championships held in Caracas, Venezuela.

== Achievements ==
| Year | Venue | Weight | Snatch (kg) | | | | Clean & Jerk (kg) | | | | Total | Rank |
| Year | Venue | Weight | 1 | 2 | 3 | Rank | 1 | 2 | 3 | Rank | Total | Rank |
Summer Olympics
| 2021 | Tokyo, Japan | 55 kg | 90 | ~~94~~ | ~~95~~ | —N/a | 105 | ~~110~~ | ~~110~~ | —N/a | 195 | 9 |
Pan American Games
| 2019 | Lima, Peru | 55 kg | 88 | ~~91~~ | 91 | —N/a | 108 | ~~111~~ | 111 | —N/a | 202 | 3rd place, bronze medalist(s) |
