= Shoely Mego =

Peruvian weightlifter (born 1999)

Personal information
- Full name: Shoely Mabel Mego Contreras
- Born: 1999 (age 26–27)

Sport
- Country: Peru
- Sport: Weightlifting
- Weight class: 55 kg
Medal record
Women's weightlifting
Representing Peru
Pan American Championships
Gold medal – first place	2023 Bariloche	55 kg
South American Games
Silver medal – second place	2022 Asunción	55 kg
Bolivarian Games
Bronze medal – third place	2022 Valledupar	55 kg S
Bronze medal – third place	2022 Valledupar	55 kg CJ
Bronze medal – third place	2024 Ayacucho	55 kg

Shoely Mabel Mego Contreras (born 1999) is a Peruvian weightlifter. She won the silver medal in women's 55 kg event at the 2022 South American Games held in Asunción, Paraguay. She also won two bronze medals at the 2022 Bolivarian Games held in Valledupar, Colombia.

== Career ==
In 2019, Mego represented Peru at the Pan American Games in Lima, Peru in the women's 55 kg event. She finished in 6th place. In that same year, she competed in the women's 55 kg event at the World Weightlifting Championships held in Pattaya, Thailand.

Mego won the bronze medal in the women's 55 kg Clean & Jerk event at the 2020 Pan American Weightlifting Championships held in Santo Domingo, Dominican Republic.

Mego won two bronze medals at the 2022 Bolivarian Games held in Valledupar, Colombia. She won the silver medal in her event at the 2022 South American Games held in Asunción, Paraguay.

Mego won the bronze medal in the women's 55 kg Clean & Jerk event at the 2022 World Weightlifting Championships held in Bogotá, Colombia. She won the gold medal in her event at the 2023 Pan American Weightlifting Championships held in Bariloche, Argentina. She also won the gold medal in the Snatch and Clean & Jerk events.

== Achievements ==
Year	Venue	Weight	Snatch (kg)				Clean & Jerk (kg)				Total	Rank
Year	Venue	Weight	1	2	3	Rank	1	2	3	Rank	Total	Rank
World Championships
2019	Pattaya, Thailand	55 kg	78	82	84	21	103	108	110	9	194	14
2022	Bogotá, Colombia	55 kg	~~83~~	~~83~~	83	10	~~108~~	~~108~~	109	3rd place, bronze medalist(s)	192	7
2023	Riyadh, Saudi Arabia	55 kg	82	85	87	4	105	~~108~~	108	6	195	5
Pan American Games
2019	Lima, Peru	55 kg	80	~~83~~	83	—N/a	106	110	~~112~~	—N/a	193	6
2023	Santiago, Chile	49 kg	~~78~~	~~78~~	78	—N/a	~~100~~	~~100~~	~~100~~	—N/a	—	—
South American Games
2022	Asunción, Paraguay	55 kg	~~82~~	82	84	—N/a	105	108	~~111~~	—N/a	192	2nd place, silver medalist(s)
Bolivarian Games
2022	Valledupar, Colombia	55 kg	77	81	~~85~~	3rd place, bronze medalist(s)	100	104	107	3rd place, bronze medalist(s)	—N/a	—N/a

=== References ===
- Shoely Mego: “He demostrado que las mujeres también somos capaces de hacer una actividad pesada"
- Shoely Mego, la primera pesista peruana en ganar una medalla mundial que espera sus Laureles Deportivos | Levantamiento de pesas | IPD | DEPORTE-TOTAL | EL COMERCIO PERÚ
- Shoely Mego tras convertirse en la mejor del mundo: “Las mujeres estamos dejando en alto al Perú” - Mi Radio Peruana
- Shoely Mego alcanza la cima: peruana es la número uno del ranking mundial en levantamiento de pesas
- De vender menú en Chiclayo a ser la primera mujer en el mundo en liderar su categoría en pesas | Shoely Mego | EVAT | Deportes | La República
- Shoely Mego | Pesista peruana Shoely Mego es la N° 1 del mundo en su categoría en Levantamiento de Pesas | IWF | IPD | PAD | Instituto Peruano del Deporte | DEPORTES | CORREO
