= Weightlifting at the 2019 Pan American Games – Women's 55 kg =

Weightlifting – Women's 55 kg at the 2019 Pan American Games
- Venue: Coliseo Mariscal Caceres
- Dates: July 28
- Competitors: 9 from 9 nations

Medalists
Gold medal	Génesis Rodríguez	Venezuela
Silver medal	Yenny Sinisterra	Colombia
Bronze medal	Ana Gabriela López	Mexico

The women's 55 kg competition of the weightlifting events at the 2019 Pan American Games in Lima, Peru, was held on July 28 at the Coliseo Mariscal Caceres.

== Results ==
Nine athletes from nine countries took part.

Rank	Athlete	Nation	Group	Snatch (kg)				Clean & Jerk (kg)				Total
Rank	Athlete	Nation	Group	1	2	3	Result	1	2	3	Result	Total
1st place, gold medalist(s)	Génesis Rodríguez	Venezuela	A	93	96	~~98~~	96	113	116	~~119~~	116	212
2nd place, silver medalist(s)	Yenny Sinisterra	Colombia	A	89	92	94	94	110	~~116~~	~~119~~	110	204
3rd place, bronze medalist(s)	Ana Gabriela López	Mexico	A	88	~~91~~	91	91	108	~~111~~	111	111	202
4	Jourdan Delacruz	United States	A	~~87~~	~~88~~	88	88	109	~~113~~	~~115~~	109	197
5	Rachel Leblanc-Bazinet	Canada	A	85	~~89~~	~~89~~	85	~~107~~	108	~~110~~	108	193
6	Shoely Mego	Peru	A	80	~~83~~	83	83	106	110	~~112~~	110	193
7	Gilyeliz Guzmán	Puerto Rico	A	~~80~~	80	~~86~~	80	100	~~105~~	~~105~~	100	180
8	Abril De Candido	Argentina	A	70	74	~~77~~	74	90	94	97	97	171
9	Sofía Rito	Uruguay	A	70	~~72~~	73	73	87	90	~~92~~	90	163

== New records ==
Snatch	96 kg	Génesis Rodríguez (VEN)	PR
