= Kittima Sutanan =

Thai weightlifter (born 1992)

Kittima Sutanan (born 20 May 1992) is a Thai weightlifter.

== Weightlifting career ==
She competed at the 2013 World Championships in the Women's 53 kg, winning the Bronze medal in clean & jerk. She also competed at the 2015 Asian Weightlifting Championships in the Women's 53 kg, winning the Bronze medal in snatch.
