= Sneha Soren =

Indian weightlifter

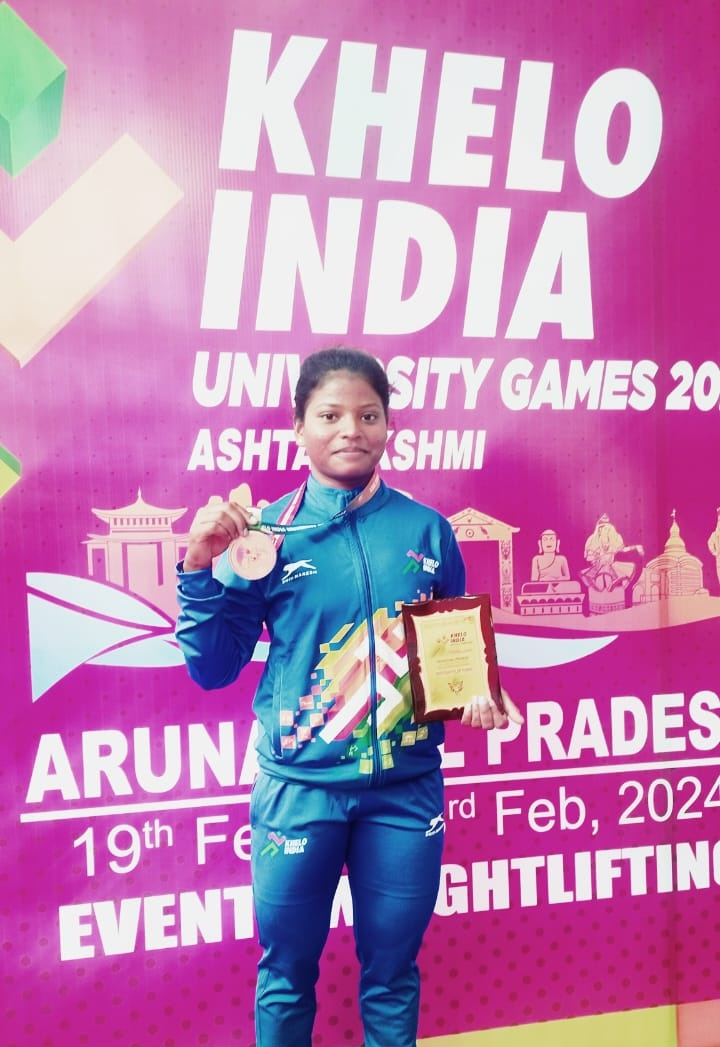
- Soren at Khelo India University Games 2023–2024

Personal information
- Nationality: Indian
- Born: 2 May 2001 (age 25) Sikharghati, Mayurbhanj, Odisha, India

Sport
- Country: India
- Sport: Weightlifting
- Event: 49 kg
Medal record
Women's weightlifting
Representing India
South Asian Games
Gold medal – first place	2019 Kathmandu and Pokhara	49 kg

Sneha Soren (born 2001) is an Indian weightlifter. She received a citation for the Ekalavya Award from the Government of Odisha.

== Career ==
Soren's standing in different events
SL No	Date	Event	Venue	Level	Standing
1	2–9 September 2017	Commonwealth Youth Weightlifting Championships	Gold Coast, Australia	International	Gold
2	20–30 April 2018	Asian Youth Weightlifting Championships	Urgench, Uzbekistan	International	Bronze
3	6–15 July 2019	Commonwealth Youth Weightlifting Championships	Apia, Samoa	International	Gold
