= Atenery Hernández =

Spanish weightlifter (born 1994)

Personal information
- Full name: Atenery Hernández Martín
- Born: 10 December 1994 (age 31) San Cristóbal de La Laguna, Tenerife
- Weight: 52.60 kg (116 lb)

Sport
- Country: Spain
- Sport: Weightlifting
- Team: National team
Medal record
European Championships
Silver medal – second place	2017 Split	– 53 kg
- Updated on 3 April 2017

Atenery Hernández Martín (born 10 December 1994 un San Cristóbal de La Laguna, Tenerife) is a Spanish weightlifter, competing in the 53 kg category and representing Spain at international competitions.

== Career ==
She competed at world championships, including at the 2015 World Weightlifting Championships.

She won the silver medal in the Women's 49 kg Snatch and Clean & Jerk events at the 2022 Mediterranean Games held in Oran, Algeria.

== Major results ==
Year	Venue	Weight	Snatch (kg)				Clean & Jerk (kg)				Total	Rank
Year	Venue	Weight	1	2	3	Rank	1	2	3	Rank	Total	Rank
World Championships
2014	Almaty, Kazakhstan	53 kg	77	~~80~~	80	17	94	97	~~100~~	22	177	20
2015	Houston, United States	53 kg	77	80	~~82~~	21	97	100	102	22	182	22
2017	Anaheim, United States	53 kg	80	~~83~~	~~83~~	10	~~100~~	100	103	10	183	10
2018	Ashgabat, Turkmenistan	55 kg	80	~~83~~	~~83~~	28	—	—	—	—	—	—
