= Sanikun Tanasan =

Thai weightlifter (born 1994)

Personal information
- Native name: ศนิกุล ธนสาร
- Nickname: Nan
- National team: Thailand
- Born: 23 December 1994 (age 31) Chumphon Province, Thailand
- Education: Institute of Physical Education Bangkok Campus
- Years active: 2010
- Height: 1.54 m (5 ft 1 in)
- Weight: 48 kg (106 lb)

Sport
- Country: Thailand
- Sport: Weightlifting
- Club: Bangkok Weightlifting Club
Medal record
Representing Thailand
| Event | 1st | 2nd | 3rd |
|---|---|---|---|
| Olympic Games | 1 | 0 | 0 |
| World Weightlifting Championships | 1 | 1 | 0 |
| Southeast Asian Games | 0 | 1 | 0 |
| Total | 2 | 2 | 0 |
Olympic Games
| Gold medal – first place | 2016 Rio de Janeiro | −48 kg |
World Championships
| Gold medal – first place | 2017 Anaheim | −53 kg |
| Silver medal – second place | 2013 Wrocław | −53 kg |
Junior World Championships
| Silver medal – second place | 2012 Guatemala City | −53 kg |
| Silver medal – second place | 2014 Kazan | −53 kg |
| Bronze medal – third place | 2013 Lima | −53 kg |
Junior Asian Championship
| Gold medal – first place | 2012 Yangoon | −53 kg |
| Gold medal – first place | 2013 Bishkek | −53 kg |
| Gold medal – first place | 2014 Chonburi | −53 kg |
Southeast Asian Games
| Gold medal – first place | 2023 Cambodia | –49 kg |
| Silver medal – second place | 2021 Vietnam | –55 kg |

Sanikun Tanasan (Thai: ศนิกุล ธนสาร; RTGS: Sanikun Thanasan; born 23 December 1994) (born Sopita Tanasan, Thai: โสภิตา ธนสาร; RTGS: Sophita Thanasan) is a Thai weightlifter. She competed at the 2013 World Championships in the Women's 53 kg, winning the bronze medal. In 2016 Olympics, she competed at the 48 kg weight class and won gold.

In January 2019 she was issued a two-year doping ban until January 2021 after testing positive for 5a-androstane-3a, 17-bdiol (5aAdiol) and 5b-androstane-3a, 17 b-diol (5bAdiol).

== Major result ==
| Year | Venue | Weight | Snatch (kg) | | | | Clean & Jerk (kg) | | | | Total | Rank |
| Year | Venue | Weight | 1 | 2 | 3 | Rank | 1 | 2 | 3 | Rank | Total | Rank |
Olympic Games
| 2016 | Rio de Janeiro, Brazil | 48 kg | 88 | 90 | 92 | 1 | 106 | 108 | ~~110~~ | 1 | 200 | 1st place, gold medalist(s) |
World Championships
| 2011 | Paris, France | 53 kg | 83 | 87 | 90 | 7 | 103 | 106 | ~~110~~ | 16 | 196 | 12 |
| 2013 | Wrocław, Poland | 53 kg | 85 | 89 | 91 | 2nd place, silver medalist(s) | 109 | 112 | ~~113~~ | 4 | 203 | 2nd place, silver medalist(s) |
| 2014 | Almaty, Kazakhstan | 53 kg | 90 | 95 | ~~99~~ | 4 | 110 | 113 | ~~116~~ | 5 | 208 | 4 |
| 2015 | Houston, United States | 53 kg | 90 | 95 | ~~100~~ | 4 | 110 | ~~115~~ | 115 | 5 | 210 | 4 |
| 2017 | Anaheim, United States | 53 kg | 91 | 94 | 96 | 1st place, gold medalist(s) | 110 | 114 | ~~117~~ | 1st place, gold medalist(s) | 210 | 1st place, gold medalist(s) |
| 2018 | Ashgabat, Turkmenistan | 49 kg | 86 | 89 | 93 ~~WR~~ | — | 102 | 108 | ~~109~~ | — | — | — |
| 2022 | Bogotá, Colombia | 49 kg | 85 | ~~87~~ | ~~88~~ | 7 | ~~103~~ | ~~103~~ | ~~103~~ | — | — | — |
Asian Games
| 2014 | Incheon, South Korea | 53 kg | 90 | 91 | 95 | 4 | 110 | ~~115~~ | ~~115~~ | 8 | 205 | 6 |
| 2018 | Jakarta, Indonesia | 53 kg | 90 | ~~93~~ | ~~94~~ | 3 | 106 | 109 | ~~111~~ | 5 | 199 | 5 |
World Junior Championships
| 2012 | Guatemala, Guatemala | 53 kg | 87 | 90 | ~~93~~ | 2nd place, silver medalist(s) | 106 | ~~111~~ | 111 | 2nd place, silver medalist(s) | 201 | 2nd place, silver medalist(s) |
| 2013 | lima, Peru | 53 kg | 86 | 89 | 91 | 1st place, gold medalist(s) | ~~105~~ | ~~106~~ | 106 | 3rd place, bronze medalist(s) | 197 | 3rd place, bronze medalist(s) |
| 2014 | Kazan, Russia | 53 kg | ~~88~~ | 88 | ~~93~~ | 2nd place, silver medalist(s) | 102 | 107 | ~~110~~ | 2nd place, silver medalist(s) | 195 | 2nd place, silver medalist(s) |
