= Hsu Shu-ching =

Taiwanese weightlifter (born 1991)

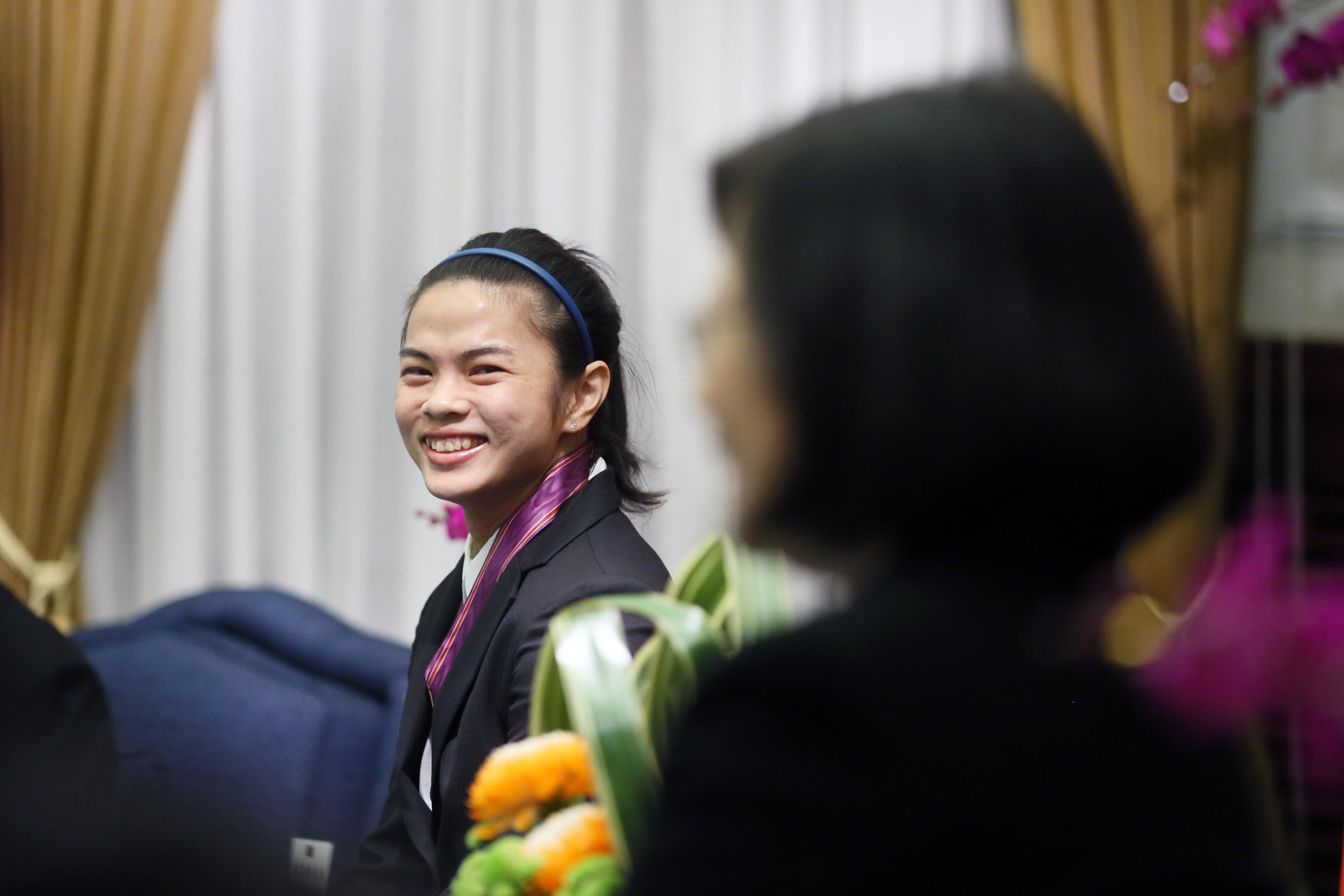

Personal information
- Born: 9 May 1991 (age 35) Lunbei, Yunlin, Taiwan
- Height: 159 cm (5 ft 3 in)
- Weight: 52.5 kg (116 lb)

Sport
- Country: Republic of China (Taiwan)
- Sport: Weightlifting
- Event: 53 kg

Achievements and titles
- Personal bests: Snatch: 101 kg (2014); Clean and jerk: 132 kg (2014); Total: 233 kg (2014, AGR, WR)
Medal record
Women's weightlifting
Representing Chinese Taipei
Olympic Games
Gold medal – first place	2012 London	-53 kg
Gold medal – first place	2016 Rio de Janeiro	-53 kg
World Championships
Gold medal – first place	2015 Houston	-53 kg
Silver medal – second place	2014 Almaty	-53 kg
Asian Games
Gold medal – first place	2014 Incheon	-53 kg
Asian Championships
Gold medal – first place	2012 Pyeongtaek	-53 kg
Universiade
Silver medal – second place	2011 Shenzhen	-53 kg

Hsu Shu-ching (Chinese: 許淑淨; pinyin: Xǔ Shújìng; born 9 May 1991) is a Taiwanese weightlifter.

== Early life ==
Hsu, of Hakka descent, was born in Lunbei, Yunlin, Taiwan. She played basketball in high school, switching to weightlifting at the age of 13, after the school disbanded its basketball team. Hsu later attended Kaohsiung Medical University.

== Weightlifting career ==
Hsu was coached by Tsai Wen-yee. She won a gold medal in the women's 53 kg at the 2012 London Olympics, after the original gold medalist, Zulfiya Chinshanlo failed a doping retest. At the 2014 Asian Games, she set a world record in the same event, with a lift of 233 kg. Hsu won another gold medal in the women's 53 kg at the 2016 Summer Olympics. Hsu announced her decision to retire from competition in June 2018, citing injuries sustained in the 2017 World Weightlifting Championships.

In March 2019, the Chinese Taipei Olympic Committee disclosed that Hsu underwent a drug test prior to the 2017 World Weightlifting Championships. Her sample tested positive for a banned substance in January 2018, and the CTOC subsequently placed Hsu under a three-year ban from competition. Hsu's test result was not publicized until March 2019, after the World Anti-Doping Agency issued a deadline for the Chinese Taipei Olympic Committee to release the information. Hsu's 2012 Olympic gold medal is scheduled to be formally conferred in 2021, and she will become the first Taiwanese competitor to have received two Olympic gold medals.
