= Sofía Rito =

Uruguayan weightlifter (born 1985)

Sofia Julia Rito Enocksson
Personal information
- Born: 2 November 1985 (age 39); Stockholm, Sweden
- Height: 1.55 m (5 ft 1 in)
- Weight: 52.94 kg (116.7 lb)

Sport
- Country: Uruguay
- Sport: Weightlifting
- Team: National team
- Updated on 21 July 2016

Sofía Julia Rito Enocksson (born 2 November 1985) is a Uruguayan weightlifter, competing in the 53 kg category and representing Uruguay at international competitions.

She competed at world championships, including at the 2015 World Weightlifting Championships, and at the 2016 Summer Olympics.

== Early life ==
Rito was born in Stockholm, Sweden to Julio Rito, who is a Uruguayan. Her mother Lotta Enocksson is a plastic artist and is the origin of one of Sofía Rito's surnames, Enocksson. Julio Rito had been exiled from Uruguay during the military dictatorship. Sofía Rito was raised in Stockholm and later in Strängnäs, Sweden.

== Major results ==
Year	Venue	Weight	Snatch (kg)				Clean & Jerk (kg)				Total	Rank
Year	Venue	Weight	1	2	3	Rank	1	2	3	Rank	Total	Rank
World Championships
2015	Houston, United States	53 kg	64	~~67~~	~~67~~	38	83	~~85~~	~~86~~	38	147	38
