= Marina Sisoeva =

Uzbekistani weightlifter (born 1993)

Marina Sisoyeva (Uzbek: Марина Сисоева; born 30 May 1993 in Fergana, Uzbekistan) is an Uzbek weightlifter. She competed at the 2012 Summer Olympics in the Women's 48 kg.
