= Li Yajun (weightlifter) =

Chinese weightlifter (born 1993)

Personal information
- Nationality: Chinese
- Born: 27 April 1993 (age 33)
- Height: 1.51 m (4 ft 11 in)
- Weight: 54.82 kg (121 lb)

Sport
- Country: China
- Sport: Weightlifting
- Event: 55 kg

Achievements and titles
- Personal bests: Snatch: 102 kg (2018); Clean and jerk: 123 kg (2018); Total: 225 kg (2018)
Medal record
Women's weightlifting
Representing China
World Championships
Gold medal – first place	2013 Wrocław	−53 kg
Gold medal – first place	2018 Ashgabat	–55 kg
Bronze medal – third place	2014 Almaty	– 53kg

Li Yajun (Chinese: 黎雅君; born 27 April 1993) is a Chinese weightlifter, Olympian, and World Champion competing in the 53 kg category until 2018 and 55 kg starting in 2018 after the International Weightlifting Federation reorganized the categories.

== Career ==
She competed at the 2013 World Championships in the Women's 53 kg, winning the gold medal.

== Major results ==
Year	Venue	Weight	Snatch (kg)				Clean & Jerk (kg)				Total	Rank
Year	Venue	Weight	1	2	3	Rank	1	2	3	Rank	Total	Rank
Olympic Games
2016	Rio de Janeiro, Brazil	53 kg	98	101	~~104~~	1	~~123~~	~~126~~	~~126~~	--	--	--
World Championships
2013	Wrocław, Poland	53 kg	95	100	~~104~~	1st place, gold medalist(s)	115	120	121	1st place, gold medalist(s)	221	1st place, gold medalist(s)
2014	Almaty, Kazakhstan	53 kg	96	~~100~~	~~100~~	3rd place, bronze medalist(s)	115	117	118	3rd place, bronze medalist(s)	214	3rd place, bronze medalist(s)
2018	Ashgabat, Turkmenistan	55 kg	97	100 WR	102 WR	1st place, gold medalist(s)	117	121	123	3rd place, bronze medalist(s)	225	1st place, gold medalist(s)
