= Kanae Yagi =

Japanese weightlifter

Personal information
- Born: July 16, 1992 (age 33) Kobe, Japan
- Height: 1.52 m (5 ft 0 in)
- Weight: 53 kg (117 lb)

Sport
- Country: Japan
- Sport: Weightlifting
Medal record
Gold medal – first place	2013 Summer Universiade	53 kg

Kanae Yagi (八木 かなえ, Yagi Kanae) is a Japanese weightlifter. She competed at the 2012 Summer Olympics in the Women's 53 kg, finishing 13th. At the 2016 Summer Olympics, in the same weight category, she finished top of Group B and 6th overall.

She won at the 2013 Summer Universiade in the Women's 53 kg.
