= Zulfiya Chinshanlo =

Kazakhstani weightlifter (born 1993)

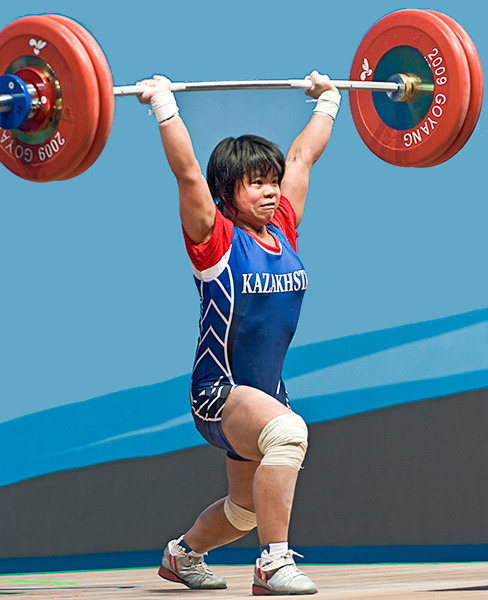
- Chinshanlo at the 2009 World Championships

Personal information
- Born: 赵常玲 (Zhao Changling); 25 July 1993 (age 33) Almaty, Kazakhstan
- Height: 1.55 m (5 ft 1 in)
- Weight: 53 kg (117 lb)

Sport
- Country: Kazakhstan
- Sport: Weightlifting
- Event: 53 kg
- Coached by: Viktor Ni

Achievements and titles
- Personal bests: Snatch: 98 kg (2014); Clean and jerk: 134 kg (2014, WR); Total: 232 kg (2014)
Medal record
Women's weightlifting
Representing Kazakhstan
Olympic Games
Bronze medal – third place	2020 Tokyo	55 kg
Disqualified	2012 London	-53 kg
World Championships
Gold medal – first place	2009 Goyang	-53 kg
Gold medal – first place	2011 Paris	-53 kg
Gold medal – first place	2014 Almaty	-53 kg
Asian Games
Silver medal – second place	2010 Guangzhou	-53 kg
Silver medal – second place	2014 Incheon	-53 kg
Asian Championships
Gold medal – first place	2022 Manama	-55 kg
Islamic Solidarity Games
Gold medal – first place	2021 Konya	59 kg
Youth Olympic Games
Silver medal – second place	2010 Singapore	-58 kg

Zulfiya Salakharqyzy Chinshanlo (Kazakh: Zülfia Salaharqyzy Çinşanlo; Dungan and Russian: Зульфия Салахаровна Чиншанло; Chinese: 赵常玲 Zhào Cháng Líng; born 25 July 1993) is a Kazakhstani weightlifter. She is a three time world champion and Olympic bronze medalist.

== Career ==
At the 2012 London Olympics, Chinshanlo won gold in the women's 53 kg weightlifting along with setting a new world record in the clean and jerk by lifting 131 kg.

However, she was stripped of her medal and her world record was invalidated after her blood sample tested positive for the banned steroids oxandrolone and stanozolol, and she was "provisionally suspended" by the International Weightlifting Federation. On 27 October 2016, the IOC stripped her of both her gold medal and world and Olympic records as a result of her doping positive.

Chinshanlo earned a gold medal at the 2014 World Championships. This was Kazakhstan's first podium finish at the competition.

In July 2021, she represented Kazakhstan at the 2020 Summer Olympics in Tokyo, Japan. She won the bronze medal in the women's 55 kg event.

== Nationality issues ==
On 8 November 2012, Kazakhstan London Olympic champion Zulfiya Chinshanlo got the Olympic Council of Asia award as the best Asian athlete, along with Ilya Ilyin and Olga Rypakova.

Zulfiya, according to her official profile, is an ethnic Dungan, a Chinese Muslim people of Hui origin. As her first language, she speaks the Dungan language, a relatively recent language that evolved from the Central Plains Mandarin variety of Chinese.

According to Chinese official media Xinhua News, Zulfiya was born and grew up in Hunan Province, China. Thus, she has a Chinese name and can speak Chinese more fluently than Russian. She emigrated to Kazakhstan in 2008 along with Maiya Maneza with the approval of Hunan sport officials on a five-year lease contract. She returned to China in 2012.

Chinese media wrote that the weightlifter received her Chinese ID in the Public Security Department of Changsha city on 22 October and was going to join the Chinese national team, because her 5-year contract with Kazakhstan allegedly expired.

However, Kazakhstan sports authorities insist that Zulfiya Chinshanlo is a citizen of Kazakhstan:

"Zulfiya Chinshanlo is our sportswoman. I don’t know why foreign media is discussing a change of her citizenship. She is a citizen of Kazakhstan. She had been living and training in Kazakhstan since she was 14. No official claims have been submitted to our Agency or the Weightlifting Federation. Zulfiya was on vacation and decided to visit her relatives in China. After a break she will go back to training for the world championships and the next Olympics as a member of Kazakhstan national team," Agency for Sports and Physical Culture Talgat Yermegiyayev said.

On 27 October 2012, Chinshanlo came back from China and announced:

"I would like to say that everything written about me in China is not true. I have proved it by coming back to Kazakhstan and being here right now. I would like to thank everyone who supported me. Once again, all these rumors are lies and I don’t want to return to discussing this issue again."

However, according to official Kazakh records, Zulfiya was born 25 July 1993 in Almaty, Kazakhstan. Her father Salakhar Chinshanlo is a businessman who speaks fluently both Russian and Dungan language.

Chinese media says her father is Guisheng Zhao (赵贵生), from Hunan Province, a baker running a bakery in her hometown - Daoxian (道县), who only speaks Mandarin Chinese, he also once said "bring my daughter back (from Kazakhstan)". And in the video we can see her contract with Kazakh. She and Yao Meili (Yao li) aka Maiya Maneza were sold to Kazakhstan (reporters believe) for $25,000 each and then became Kazakh citizens. Chinshanlo rejected the claim.

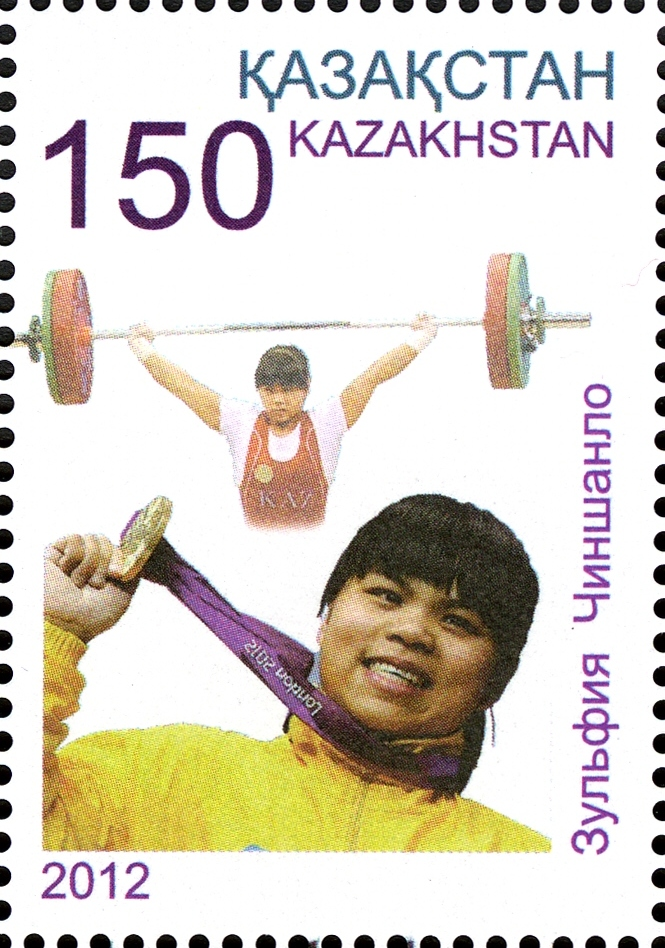
Chinshanlo on a 2013 stamp of Kazakhstan

== Major results ==
Year	Venue	Weight	Snatch (kg)				Clean & Jerk (kg)				Total	Rank
Year	Venue	Weight	1	2	3	Rank	1	2	3	Rank	Total	Rank
Olympic Games
2012	London, United Kingdom	53 kg	~~92~~	92	95	3	125	131	~~135~~	1	--	DQ
2021	Tokyo, Japan	55 kg	90	~~93~~	~~93~~	5	~~123~~	123	~~125~~	3	213	3rd place, bronze medalist(s)
World Championships
2009	Goyang, South Korea	53 kg	~~87~~	87	90	5	120	125	129	1st place, gold medalist(s)	219	1st place, gold medalist(s)
2011	Paris, France	53 kg	93	97	~~100~~	1st place, gold medalist(s)	120	126	130	1st place, gold medalist(s)	227	1st place, gold medalist(s)
2014	Almaty, Kazakhstan	53 kg	95	~~98~~	98	2nd place, silver medalist(s)	127	133	134	1st place, gold medalist(s)	232	1st place, gold medalist(s)
Asian Games
2010	Guangzhou, China	53 kg	90	95	97	2	122	~~130~~	~~130~~	3	219	2nd place, silver medalist(s)
2014	Incheon, South Korea	53 kg	93	~~96~~	96	3	125	132	~~137~~	1	228	2nd place, silver medalist(s)
Youth Olympic Games
2010	Singapore, Singapore	58 kg	90	95	~~97~~	2	120	125	130	2	225	2nd place, silver medalist(s)
World Youth Championships
2009	Chiang Mai, Thailand	58 kg	85	89	92	3rd place, bronze medalist(s)	115	~~123~~	~~123~~	3rd place, bronze medalist(s)	207	3rd place, bronze medalist(s)

In June 2016, IWF announced that retests of the samples taken from the 2012 Olympics indicated that Zulfiya Chinshanlo had tested positive for prohibited substances, namely Oxandrolone and Stanazolol. Three other Kazakhs failed the doping test: Ilya Ilyin, Maiya Maneza and Svetlana Podobedova. They were disqualified and had their Olympic medals revoked on Oct 27, 2016.
