= List of flag bearers for Papua New Guinea at the Olympics =

Papua New Guinea at the Olympics
- IOC code: PNG
- NOC: Papua New Guinea Olympic Committee
- Website: www.oceaniasport.com/png
- Medals: Gold 0 Silver 0 Bronze 0 Total 0

Summer appearances
- 1976; 1980; 1984; 1988; 1992; 1996; 2000; 2004; 2008; 2012; 2016; 2020; 2024

This is a list of flag bearers who have represented Papua New Guinea at the Olympics.

Flag bearers carry the national flag of their country at the opening ceremony of the Olympic Games.

#	Event year	Season	Flag bearer	Sport
1	1976	Summer	Wavala Kali	Athletics
2	1984	Summer	Iammogapi Launa	Athletics
3	1988	Summer	Pinye Malaibi	Weightlifting
4	1992	Summer		
5	1996	Summer	Subul Babo	Athletics
6	2000	Summer	Xenia Peni	Swimming
7	2004	Summer	Dika Toua	Weightlifting
8	2008	Summer	Ryan Pini	Swimming
9	2012	Summer	Toea Wisil	Athletics
10	2016	Summer	Ryan Pini	Swimming
11	2020	Summer	Morea Baru	Weightlifting
11	2020	Summer	Dika Toua	Weightlifting
12	2024	Summer	Gibson Mara	Taekwondo
12	2024	Summer	Georgia-Leigh Vele	Swimming

== See also ==
- Papua New Guinea at the Olympics
