= Papua New Guinea at the Paralympics =

- IPC code: PNG
- NPC: Papua New Guinea Paralympic Committee
- Medals: Gold 0 Silver 1 Bronze 0 Total 1

Summer appearances
- 1984; 1988–1996; 2000; 2004; 2008; 2012; 2016; 2020; 2024

Papua New Guinea first competed at the Summer Paralympic Games in 1984, sending a delegation of four athletes to compete in track and field, then missed out on three consecutive Games before returning in 2000, with two athletes in track and field and one in powerlifting. Papua New Guinea was absent again in 2004, and returned for its third competition in 2008.

Francis Kompaon won Papua New Guinea's first Paralympic or Olympic medal when he took silver in the 100 metre sprint, T46 category, at the 2008 Games. He finished 0.05 seconds behind gold medal winner Heath Francis, of Australia.

Papua New Guinea has never taken part in the Winter Paralympic Games.

== List of medallists ==
Medal	Name	Games	Sport	Event
Silver	Francis Kompaon	2008 Beijing	Athletics	Men's 100m T46

== See also ==
- Papua New Guinea at the Olympics
