= Papua New Guinea at the 2000 Summer Olympics =

- IOC code: PNG
- NOC: Papua New Guinea Olympic Committee
- Website: www.pngolympic.org

in Sydney
- Flag bearer: Xenia Peni
- Medals: Gold 0 Silver 0 Bronze 0 Total 0

Summer Olympics appearances (overview)
- 1976; 1980; 1984; 1988; 1992; 1996; 2000; 2004; 2008; 2012; 2016; 2020; 2024

Papua New Guinea competed at the 2000 Summer Olympics in Sydney, Australia.

== Results by event ==
=== Athletics ===
Men's 400 m hurdles

- Mowen Boino
  1. Round 1 – 51.38 (did not advance)

Women's 400 m

- Ann Mooney
  1. Round 1 – 55.55 (did not advance)

=== Swimming ===
Men's 100m Breaststroke

- Kieran Chan
  1. Preliminary Heat – 01:13.34 (did not advance)

Women's 100 m breaststroke

- Xenia Peni
  1. Preliminary Heat – 01:19.62 (did not advance)

=== Weightlifting ===
Women's 48 kg category

- Dika Toua
  1. Finished in 10th Place (Total 117.5 kg = Snatch 50 kg + C&J 67.5 kg)

== See also ==
- Papua New Guinea at the 2000 Summer Paralympics
