= Papua New Guinea at the 1976 Summer Olympics =

- IOC code: PNG (NGY used at these Games)
- NOC: Papua New Guinea Olympic Committee
- Competitors: 6 in 3 sports
- Flag bearer: Wavala Kali
- Medals: Gold 0 Silver 0 Bronze 0 Total 0

Summer Olympics appearances (overview)
- 1976; 1980; 1984; 1988; 1992; 1996; 2000; 2004; 2008; 2012; 2016; 2020; 2024

Papua New Guinea was represented at the 1976 Summer Olympics in Montreal, Quebec, Canada by the Papua New Guinea Olympic Committee. It was the first time that the country would compete at the Olympics after independence in 1975.

In total, six athletes – all men – represented Papua New Guinea across three different sports including athletics, boxing and shooting.

== Background ==
Attempts to have Papua New Guinea recognised by the International Olympic Committee (IOC) began in the 1950s but initial attempts were unsuccessful. The Papua New Guinea Sports Federation was founded in 1961 and Territory of Papua and New Guinea was represented at the 1962 British Empire and Commonwealth Games. However, IOC recognition didn't come until 1974 and Papua New Guinea made their Olympic debut at the 1976 Summer Olympics in Montreal, Quebec, Canada.

== Competitors ==
In total, six athletes represented Papua New Guinea at the 1976 Summer Olympics in Montreal, Quebec, Canada across three different sports. The first athletes to represent Papua New Guinea at the Olympics included John Kokinai from Bougainville.

Sport	Men	Women	Total
Athletics	3	0	3
Boxing	2	—	2
Shooting	1	0	1
Total	6	0	6

== Athletics ==
In total, three Papua New Guinean athletes participated in the athletics events – Wavala Kali in the men's 100 m, the men's 200 m and the men's 400 m, John Kokinai in the men's 5,000 m and the men's marathon and Tau John Tokwepota in the men's 10,000 m and the men's marathon.

== Boxing ==
In total, two Papua New Guinean athletes participated in the boxing events – Tumat Sogolik in the bantamweight category and Zoffa Yarawi in the light flyweight category.

== Shooting ==
In total, one Papua New Guinean athlete participated in the shooting events – Trevan Clough in the trap.
