= Papua New Guinea at the 2016 Summer Paralympics =

- IPC code: PNG
- NPC: Papua New Guinea Paralympic Committee

in Rio de Janeiro
- Competitors: 2 in 1 sports
- Medals: Gold 0 Silver 0 Bronze 0 Total 0

Summer Paralympics appearances (overview)
- 1984; 1988–1996; 2000; 2004; 2008; 2012; 2016; 2020; 2024

Papua New Guinea competed at the 2016 Summer Paralympics in Rio de Janeiro, Brazil, from 7 September to 18 September 2016.

== Disability classifications ==
Every participant at the Paralympics has their disability grouped into one of five disability categories; amputation, the condition may be congenital or sustained through injury or illness; cerebral palsy; wheelchair athletes, there is often overlap between this and other categories; visual impairment, including blindness; Les autres, any physical disability that does not fall strictly under one of the other categories, for example dwarfism or multiple sclerosis. Each Paralympic sport then has its own classifications, dependent upon the specific physical demands of competition. Events are given a code, made of numbers and letters, describing the type of event and classification of the athletes competing. Some sports, such as athletics, divide athletes by both the category and severity of their disabilities, other sports, for example swimming, group competitors from different categories together, the only separation being based on the severity of the disability.

== Athletics ==
=== Men's track ===
Athlete	Events	Heat		Final	
Athlete	Events	Time	Rank	Time	Rank
Samuel Nason	400 m T45-47	53.64	4	did not advance	

=== Women's track ===
Joyleen Jeffrey was the opening ceremonies flag bearer for Papua New Guinea.

Athlete	Events	Heat		Semifinal		Final	
Athlete	Events	Time	Rank	Time	Rank	Time	Rank
Joyleen Jeffrey	100 m T12	15.33	3	did not advance			
Joyleen Jeffrey	200 m T12	32.78	4	—N/a		did not advance	

== Broadcasting ==
No broadcaster had the rights to the Games in Papua New Guinea. The Games were available via live streaming on the International Paralympic Committee website.

== See also ==
- Papua New Guinea at the 2016 Summer Olympics
