= Papua New Guinea at the 1988 Summer Olympics =

- IOC code: PNG (NGU used at these Games)
- NOC: Papua New Guinea Olympic Committee

in Seoul
- Competitors: 11 in 4 sports
- Flag bearer: Pinye Malaibi
- Officials: 9
- Medals: Gold 0 Silver 0 Bronze 0 Total 0

Summer Olympics appearances (overview)
- 1976; 1980; 1984; 1988; 1992; 1996; 2000; 2004; 2008; 2012; 2016; 2020; 2024

Papua New Guinea competed at the 1988 Summer Olympics in Seoul, South Korea.

== Competitors ==
The following is the list of number of competitors in the Games.

Sport	Men	Women	Total
Athletics	4	2	6
Boxing	2	–	2
Sailing	1	0	1
Weightlifting	2	–	2
Total	9	2	11

== Athletics ==
=== Men ===
==== Track events ====
Athlete	Events	Heat		Round 2		Semifinal		Final	
Athlete	Events	Time	Position	Time	Position	Time	Position	Time	Position
Aaron Dupnai	10,000 m	32:50.63	41					Did not advance	
Aaron Dupnai	Marathon							2:41:47	75
John Hou	100 m	10.96	82	Did not advance					
Johnd Siguria	800 m	1:56.12	63			Did not advance			
Johnd Siguria	1500 m	4:07.04	57			Did not advance			
Takale Tuna	200 m	21.95	53	Did not advance					
Takale Tuna	400 m	47.87	47	47.48	32	Did not advance			

=== Women ===
==== Track events ====
Athlete	Events	Heat		Semifinal		Final	
Athlete	Events	Time	Position	Time	Position	Time	Position
Polonie Avek	1500 m	4:46.49	27			Did not advance	
Polonie Avek	3000 m	DNF	34			Did not advance	
Iammogapi Launa	Heptathlon					4566 pts	25

== Boxing ==
Athlete	Event	Round of 64	Round of 32	Round of 16	Quarterfinals	Semifinals	Final
Athlete	Event	Opposition Result	Opposition Result	Opposition Result	Opposition Result	Opposition Result	Opposition Result
Jonas Bade	Light Welterweight	Anoumou Aguiar (TOG); L DSQ	Did not advance				
Washington Banian	Light Flyweight		Scotty Olson (CAN); L KOH	Did not advance			

== Sailing ==
Men

Athlete	Event	Race							Score	Rank
Athlete	Event	1	2	3	4	5	6	7	Score	Rank
Graham Numa	Division II	42	39	42	41	20	42	34	301	44

== Weightlifting ==
Men

Athlete	Event	Snatch		Clean & jerk		Total	Rank
Athlete	Event	Result	Rank	Result	Rank	Total	Rank
Pinye Malaibi	Lightweight	105 kg	20	125 kg	20	230 kg	19
Roger Token	Middleweight	110 kg	21	145 kg	20	255 kg	20
