= Papua New Guinea at the 1984 Summer Olympics =

- IOC code: PNG (NGU used at these Games)
- NOC: Papua New Guinea Olympic Committee

in Los Angeles
- Competitors: 3
- Flag bearer: Iammogapi Launa
- Medals: Gold 0 Silver 0 Bronze 0 Total 0

Summer Olympics appearances (overview)
- 1976; 1980; 1984; 1988; 1992; 1996; 2000; 2004; 2008; 2012; 2016; 2020; 2024

Papua New Guinea competed at the 1984 Summer Olympics in Los Angeles, United States. The nation returned to the Olympic Games after participating in the American-led boycott of the 1980 Summer Olympics.

== Results by event ==
=== Athletics ===
Men's 400 metres

- Lapule Tamean

- Heat — 47.60 (→ did not advance)

Men's 5,000 metres

- John Tau

- Heat — 15:24.68 (→ did not advance)

Men's 10,000 metres

- John Tau

- Heat — 31:29.14 (→ did not advance)

Men's Marathon

- John Tau — 2:36:36 (→ 66th place)

Women's Javelin Throw

- Iammogapi Launa

- Qualification — did not start (→ did not advance)

Women's Heptathlon

- Iammogapi Launa

- Final Result — 5148 points (→ 19th place)

== See also ==
- Papua New Guinea at the 1984 Summer Paralympics
