= Papua New Guinea at the 2008 Summer Olympics =

- IOC code: PNG
- NOC: Papua New Guinea Olympic Committee
- Website: www.pngolympic.org

in Beijing
- Competitors: 7 in 5 sports
- Flag bearer: Ryan Pini
- Medals: Gold 0 Silver 0 Bronze 0 Total 0

Summer Olympics appearances (overview)
- 1976; 1980; 1984; 1988; 1992; 1996; 2000; 2004; 2008; 2012; 2016; 2020; 2024; 2028

Papua New Guinea sent a team to compete at the 2008 Summer Olympics in Beijing, China. The country's participation, in part, was funded by a large "nationwide fun run" organised in early July, with expectations of 35,000 participating runners. Papua New Guinea was represented by a total of seven athletes.

== Athletics ==
Men

| Athlete | Event | Heat | | Semifinal | | Final | |
| Athlete | Event | Result | Rank | Result | Rank | Result | Rank |
|---|---|---|---|---|---|---|---|
| Mowen Boino | 400 m hurdles | 51.47 | 6 | Did not advance | | | |

Women

| Athlete | Event | Heat | | Semifinal | | Final | |
| Athlete | Event | Result | Rank | Result | Rank | Result | Rank |
|---|---|---|---|---|---|---|---|
| Mae Koime | 100 m | 11.68 | 6 | Did not advance | | | |

Key

- Note–Ranks given for track events are within the athlete's heat only
- Q = Qualified for the next round
- q = Qualified for the next round as a fastest loser or, in field events, by position without achieving the qualifying target
- NR = National record
- N/A = Round not applicable for the event
- Bye = Athlete not required to compete in round

== Boxing ==
Papua New Guinea qualified one boxer for the Olympic boxing tournament. Jack Willie qualified in the light flyweight class at the Oceania Championships.

| Athlete | Event | Round of 32 | Round of 16 | Quarterfinals | Semifinals | Final | |
| Athlete | Event | Opposition Result | Opposition Result | Opposition Result | Opposition Result | Opposition Result | Rank |
|---|---|---|---|---|---|---|---|
| Jack Willie | Light flyweight | Ruenroeng (THA); L 2–14 | Did not advance | | | | |

== Swimming ==
Men

| Athlete | Event | Heat | | Semifinal | | Final | |
| Athlete | Event | Time | Rank | Time | Rank | Time | Rank |
|---|---|---|---|---|---|---|---|
| Ryan Pini | 100 m freestyle | 49.72 | 39 | Did not advance | | | |
| Ryan Pini | 200 m freestyle | 1:49.04 | 32 | Did not advance | | | |
| Ryan Pini | 100 m butterfly | 52.00 | 14 Q | 51.62 | 8 Q | 51.86 | 8 |

Women

| Athlete | Event | Heat | | Semifinal | | Final | |
| Athlete | Event | Time | Rank | Time | Rank | Time | Rank |
|---|---|---|---|---|---|---|---|
| Anna-Liza Mopio-Jane | 50 m freestyle | 26.47 | 42 | Did not advance | | | |

== Taekwondo ==
| Athlete | Event | Round of 16 | Quarterfinals | Semifinals | Repechage | Bronze Medal | Final | |
| Athlete | Event | Opposition Result | Opposition Result | Opposition Result | Opposition Result | Opposition Result | Opposition Result | Rank |
|---|---|---|---|---|---|---|---|---|
| Theresa Tona | Women's −49 kg | Tran (VIE); L 0–5 | Did not advance | | | | | |

== Weightlifting ==
| Athlete | Event | Snatch | | Clean & Jerk | | Total | Rank |
| Athlete | Event | Result | Rank | Result | Rank | Total | Rank |
|---|---|---|---|---|---|---|---|
| Dika Toua | Women's −53 kg | 80 | 8 | 104 | 7 | 184 | 8 |

== See also ==
- Papua New Guinea at the 2008 Summer Paralympics
