= Papua New Guinea at the Olympics =

- IOC code: PNG
- NOC: Papua New Guinea Olympic Committee
- Website: www.pngolympic.org
- Medals: Gold 0 Silver 0 Bronze 0 Total 0

Summer appearances
- 1976; 1980; 1984; 1988; 1992; 1996; 2000; 2004; 2008; 2012; 2016; 2020; 2024; 2028

Papua New Guinea first participated at the Olympic Games in 1976, and has sent athletes to compete in every Summer Olympic Games since then, except when the nation participated in the American-led boycott of the 1980 Summer Olympics. The nation has never won a medal and has never participated in the Winter Olympic Games.

The NOC's highest placement to date is 5th by weightlifter Morea Baru at the men's featherweight event at the 2024 Summer Olympics. Weightlifter Dika Toua achieved the highest placement by a female Papua New Guinea athlete, placing 6th at the women's featherweight event at the 2004 Summer Olympics. Meanwhile, swimmer Ryan Pini achieved the highest placement in a non-weightlifting sport, placing 8th at the men's 100 metre butterfly event at the 2008 Summer Olympics.

The National Olympic Committee for Papua New Guinea was created in 1973 and recognized by the International Olympic Committee in 1974.

== Medal tables ==
=== Medals by Summer Games ===
| Games | Athletes | Gold | Silver | Bronze | Total | Rank |
| (Canada) 1976 Montreal | 5 | 0 | 0 | 0 | 0 | – |
| (Soviet Union) 1980 Moscow | boycotted | | | | | |
| (United States) 1984 Los Angeles | 7 | 0 | 0 | 0 | 0 | – |
| (South Korea) 1988 Seoul | 11 | 0 | 0 | 0 | 0 | – |
| (Spain) 1992 Barcelona | 13 | 0 | 0 | 0 | 0 | – |
| (United States) 1996 Atlanta | 11 | 0 | 0 | 0 | 0 | – |
| (Australia) 2000 Sydney | 5 | 0 | 0 | 0 | 0 | – |
| (Greece) 2004 Athens | 4 | 0 | 0 | 0 | 0 | – |
| (China) 2008 Beijing | 7 | 0 | 0 | 0 | 0 | – |
| (United Kingdom) 2012 London | 8 | 0 | 0 | 0 | 0 | – |
| (Brazil) 2016 Rio de Janeiro | 8 | 0 | 0 | 0 | 0 | – |
| (Japan) 2020 Tokyo | 8 | 0 | 0 | 0 | 0 | – |
| (France) 2024 Paris | 7 | 0 | 0 | 0 | 0 | – |
| (United States) 2028 Los Angeles | future event | | | | | |
| (Australia) 2032 Brisbane | future event | | | | | |
| Total | | 0 | 0 | 0 | 0 | – |

== See also ==
- List of flag bearers for Papua New Guinea at the Olympics
- Category:Olympic competitors for Papua New Guinea
- Papua New Guinea at the Paralympics
