= Papua New Guinea at the 2016 Summer Olympics =

- IOC code: PNG
- NOC: Papua New Guinea Olympic Committee
- Website: www.pngolympic.org

in Rio de Janeiro
- Competitors: 8 in 6 sports
- Flag bearer: Ryan Pini
- Medals: Gold 0 Silver 0 Bronze 0 Total 0

Summer Olympics appearances (overview)
- 1976; 1980; 1984; 1988; 1992; 1996; 2000; 2004; 2008; 2012; 2016; 2020; 2024

Papua New Guinea competed at the 2016 Summer Olympics in Rio de Janeiro, Brazil, from 5 to 21 August 2016. This was the nation's tenth appearance at the Summer Olympics.

Papua New Guinea Olympic Committee (PNGOC) sent a team of eight athletes, six men and two women, to compete in six sports at the Games, matching the nation's roster size with London 2012. Attending his fourth and final Olympics as the oldest (aged 34) and most experienced competitor, butterfly swimmer and former top 8 finalist Ryan Pini reprised his role of leading the delegation for the second time as Papua New Guinea's flag bearer in the opening ceremony, the first having done so eight years earlier in Beijing. Apart from Pini, the Papua New Guinean roster also featured 18-year-old taekwondo fighter Maxemillion Kassman, along with his aunt Samantha, and two returning Olympians from London 2012: sprinter Toea Wisil (women's 100 metres) and judoka Raymond Ovinou (men's 66 kg).

Papua New Guinea, however, has yet to win its first-ever Olympic medal.

== Background ==
From the late 1950s to early 1970s, Papua New Guinea made multiple attempts to join the International Olympic Committee. After the creation of the Papua New Guinea British Empire and Commonwealth Games Association in 1961, the organization was renamed multiple times before becoming the Papua New Guinea Olympic Committee. After becoming part of the IOC in 1974, Papua New Guinea debuted at the 1976 Summer Olympics and boycotted the 1980 Summer Olympics. Upon their Olympic return at the 1984 Summer Olympics, the country competed in eight consecutive Summer Olympics leading up to the 2016 Summer Olympics.

Of the eight person team, Ryan Pini appeared in his fourth back to back Olympics and was the country's flag bearer at the opening ceremony. Returning two-time Olympians from the 2012 Summer Olympics for Papua New Guinea were runner Toea Wisil and judoist Raymond Ovinou. The remaining competitor in athletics, Theo Piniau, appeared in his first Olympics during 2016. In her Olympic debut, taekwondoist Samantha Kassman was the flag bearer for the nation during the closing ceremony. Her nephew, Maxemillion Kassman also competed in taekwondo at his first Olympics. The remaining first time Olympic competitors for Papua New Guinea were boxer Thadius Katua and weightlifter Morea Baru.

== Athletics (track and field) ==
Papua New Guinean athletes have so far achieved qualifying standards in the following athletics events (up to a maximum of 3 athletes in each event):

Key

- Note–Ranks given for track events are within the athlete's heat only
- Q = Qualified for the next round
- q = Qualified for the next round as a fastest loser or, in field events, by position without achieving the qualifying target
- NR = National record
- N/A = Round not applicable for the event
- Bye = Athlete not required to compete in round

Track & road events

Athlete	Event	Heat		Quarterfinal		Semifinal		Final	
Athlete	Event	Result	Rank	Result	Rank	Result	Rank	Result	Rank
Theo Piniau	Men's 200 m	22.14	8	—N/a		Did not advance			
Toea Wisil	Women's 100 m	Bye		11.48	4	Did not advance			

== Boxing ==
Papua New Guinea has received an invitation from the Tripartite Commission to send a male boxer competing in the lightweight division to the Games, signifying the nation's return to the sport after an eight-year hiatus.

Athlete	Event	Round of 32	Round of 16	Quarterfinals	Semifinals	Final	
Athlete	Event	Opposition Result	Opposition Result	Opposition Result	Opposition Result	Opposition Result	Rank
Thadius Katua	Men's lightweight	Abdurashidov (RUS); L 0–3	Did not advance				

== Judo ==
Papua New Guinea has qualified one judoka for the men's half-lightweight category (66 kg) at the Games. London 2012 Olympian Raymond Ovinou earned a continental quota spot from the Oceania region, as Papua New Guinea's top-ranked judoka outside of direct qualifying position in the IJF World Ranking List of May 30, 2016.

Athlete	Event	Round of 64	Round of 32	Round of 16	Quarterfinals	Semifinals	Repechage	Final / BM	
Athlete	Event	Opposition Result	Opposition Result	Opposition Result	Opposition Result	Opposition Result	Opposition Result	Opposition Result	Rank
Raymond Ovinou	Men's −66 kg	Bouchard (CAN); L 000–100	Did not advance						

== Swimming ==
Papua New Guinea has received a Universality invitation from FINA to send a male swimmer to the Olympics.

Athlete	Event	Heat		Semifinal		Final	
Athlete	Event	Time	Rank	Time	Rank	Time	Rank
Ryan Pini	Men's 100 m butterfly	53.24	=30	Did not advance			

== Taekwondo ==
Papua New Guinea entered two athletes into the taekwondo competition. Maxemillion Kassman and his aunt Samantha secured spots each in the men's lightweight (68 kg) and women's heavyweight category (+67 kg) respectively by virtue of their top finish at the 2016 Oceania Qualification Tournament in Port Moresby.

Athlete	Event	Round of 16	Quarterfinals	Semifinals	Repechage	Final / BM	
Athlete	Event	Opposition Result	Opposition Result	Opposition Result	Opposition Result	Opposition Result	Rank
Maxemillion Kassman	Men's −68 kg	Achab (BEL); L 1–15 PTG	Did not advance				
Samantha Kassman	Women's +67 kg	Walkden (GBR); L 1–14 PTG	Did not advance				

== Weightlifting ==
Papua New Guinea has received an invitation from the Tripartite Commission to send Morea Baru in the men's featherweight category (62 kg) to the Olympics.

Athlete	Event	Snatch		Clean & Jerk		Total	Rank
Athlete	Event	Result	Rank	Result	Rank	Total	Rank
Morea Baru	Men's −62 kg	126	6	164	6	290	6
