= Papua New Guinea at the 1992 Summer Olympics =

- IOC code: PNG
- NOC: Papua New Guinea Olympic Committee

in Barcelona
- Competitors: 13 in 4 sports
- Medals: Gold 0 Silver 0 Bronze 0 Total 0

Summer Olympics appearances (overview)
- 1976; 1980; 1984; 1988; 1992; 1996; 2000; 2004; 2008; 2012; 2016; 2020; 2024

Papua New Guinea competed at the 1992 Summer Olympics in Barcelona, Spain.

== Competitors ==
The following is the list of number of competitors in the Games.

Sport	Men	Women	Total
Athletics	5	1	6
Boxing	5	–	5
Sailing	1	0	1
Weightlifting	1	–	1
Total	12	1	13

== Athletics ==
Men
Track and road events

Athlete	Event	Heats		Quarterfinal		Semifinal		Final	
Athlete	Event	Result	Rank	Result	Rank	Result	Rank	Result	Rank
Bernard Manana	100 metres	11.35	72	Did not advance					
Kaminiel Selot	200 metres	22.36	70	Did not advance					
Subul Babo	400 metres	47.17	44	Did not advance					
Baobo Neuendorf	400 metres hurdles	53.30	39	—N/a		Did not advance			
Baobo Neuendorf; Kaminiel Selot; Bernard Manana; Subul Babo	4 × 400 metres relay	3:13.35	20	—N/a				Did not advance	

Combined events – Decathlon

Athlete	Event	100 m	LJ	SP	HJ	400 m	110H	DT	PV	JT	1500 m	Final	Rank
Erich Momberger	Result	11.55	6.33	13.57	1.88	51.78	16.68	39.52	4.20	52.24	4:46.64	6780	25
Erich Momberger	Points	742	659	702	696	734	658	655	673	622	639	6780	25

Women
Track and road events

Athlete	Event	Heats		Quarterfinal		Semifinal		Final	
Athlete	Event	Result	Rank	Result	Rank	Result	Rank	Result	Rank
Rosemary Turare	1500 metres	5:10.52	39	—N/a		Did not advance			
Rosemary Turare	3000 metres	11:15.18	33	—N/a				Did not advance	
Rosemary Turare	10,000 metres	42:02.79	42	—N/a				Did not advance	

== Boxing ==
Athlete	Event	Round of 32	Round of 16	Quarterfinals	Semifinals	Final	
Athlete	Event	Opposition Result	Opposition Result	Opposition Result	Opposition Result	Opposition Result	Rank
Ronnie Noan	Flyweight	Strogov (BUL); L RSC R2	Did not advance				
John Sem	Bantamweight	Todorov (BUL); L 0–11	Did not advance				
Steven Kevi	Featherweight	Dezorzi (BRA); L 6–20	Did not advance				
Henry Kungsi	Lightweight	Arshad (PAK); W 13–9	Tonchev (BUL); L 2–11	Did not advance			
Hubert Meta	Light welterweight	Bye	Nikolayev (EUN); L 2–17	Did not advance			

== Sailing ==
Men

Athlete	Event	Race										Net points	Final rank
Athlete	Event	1	2	3	4	5	6	7	8	9	10	Net points	Final rank
Graham Numa	Lechner A-390	~~51~~	48	47	51	51	47	51	47	45	51	438	43

== Weightlifting ==
Athlete	Event	Snatch		Clean & jerk		Total	Rank
Athlete	Event	Result	Rank	Result	Rank	Total	Rank
Paul Enuki	90 kg	122.5	22	170.0	19	292.5	19
