= Papua New Guinea at the 2012 Summer Paralympics =

- IPC code: PNG
- NPC: Papua New Guinea Paralympic Committee

in London
- Competitors: 2 in 2 sports
- Flag bearer: Francis Kompaon
- Medals: Gold 0 Silver 0 Bronze 0 Total 0

Summer Paralympics appearances (overview)
- 1984; 1988–1996; 2000; 2004; 2008; 2012; 2016; 2020; 2024

Papua New Guinea participated in the 2012 Summer Paralympics in London, United Kingdom, from August 29 to September 9, 2012.

At the previous Games, in 2008, sprinter Francis Kompaon had won Papua New Guinea's first ever Paralympic medal, a silver in the men's 100m, T46 category. He qualified for the 2012 Games. The only other qualified athlete for London was Timothy Harabe, in powerlifting in the men's 75 kg event.

As in 2008, Francis Kompaon was selected as his country's flag-bearer during the Games' opening ceremony.

Papua New Guinea did not win a medal at these Games.

== Athletics ==
Francis Kompaon competed in the men's 100m and 200m T46. He was Papua New Guinea's opening ceremonies flag bearer for this Paralympics.

In the 200m, he finished sixth (of eight) in his heat, with a new personal best of 23.05.

In the 100m, he finished third (of seven) in heat 2, qualifying for the final as the fastest loser overall with a personal best time of 11.21 (fifth fastest overall over the three heats). In the final, however, he was unable to repeat his Beijing performance; he "injured his hamstring near the finish line" and finished seventh (of eight) in 12.28.

=== Men’s track and road events ===
Athlete	Event	Heat		Final	
Athlete	Event	Result	Rank	Result	Rank
Francis Kompaon	100m T46	11.21	3 q	12.28	7
Francis Kompaon	200m T46	23.05	6	did not advance	

== Powerlifting ==
Timothy Harabe competed in the men's 75kg event.

He lifted 160 kg, finishing 10th (out of 13).

Athlete	Event	Result	Rank
Timothy Harabe	-75kg	160 kg	10

== See also ==
- Summer Paralympic disability classification
- Papua New Guinea at the Paralympics
- Papua New Guinea at the 2012 Summer Olympics
