= Susil Nelson-Kongoi =

Papua New Guinean corporate leader

- Born: Susil Nelson; Papua New Guinea
- Education: University of Canterbury (BCom) Divine Word University (MBA)

Susil Nelson-Kongoi (née Nelson) is a Papua New Guinean corporate leader and advocate for women's empowerment.

== Early life ==
Nelson-Kongoi's parents both came from rural areas in Papua New Guinea, but moved to Port Moresby, the country's largest and capital city, to pursue further education opportunities. Her parents strongly supported education, and this encouraged Nelson-Kongoi to do the same. She earned her Bachelor of Commerce at University of Canterbury in New Zealand, and her Master of Business Administration at Divine Word University in Papua New Guinea.

== Career ==
Since 2025, Nelson-Kongoi has been the president of the Business Council Papua New Guinea (BCPNG), which represents the country's private sector. As of 2026, she is the chairperson of the Board of Directions of the Digicel PNG Foundation. She is also a board member of the Centre for Excellence in Financial Inclusion. She is an inaugural member and the chairperson of the Business Advocacy's Network Steering Committee.

Nelson-Kongoi was previously a senior executive at ExxonMobil PNG, and was the CEO of the PNG Institute of Banking and Business Management until 2026.

In 2018, Nelson-Kongoi was involved in the APEC Leaders' Summit. Also in 2018, she was named as one of three Papuan Global Ambassadors for the Inspiring Rare Birds program.

Nelson-Kongoi was one of six Papuan women to attend the Australian Government's Fellowship Program in 2019. The same year, she became the first female chairperson of the PNG-Australia Partnership Group Incentive Fund's governing board, the Strategic Management Group.

In 2024, Nelson-Kongoi was one of four PNG women leaders to address the 39th Australia-Papua New Guinea Business Forum, and gave the opening address at the forum in 2025. Each year from 2023 to 2026, Nelson-Kongoi has been a speaker at the annual Business Advantage PNG Investment Conference.

== Advocacy ==
Nelson-Kongoi became one of the initial members of the governance board for Pacific Women Lead in 2022, an initiative to advance gender equality in the Pacific region through supporting women's leadership, rights and safety. She was appointed to the position by Australia's Minister for Foreign Affairs.

She has also trained other women to support gender equality in Papua New Guinea in the oil and gas industry.

== Awards and honours ==
In 2012, Nelson-Kongoi won the Westpac Women in Business Award. In 2024, she was the Guest of Honour at the Port Moresby Business and Professional Women's Club (BPW) Independence Ball.
