= Grand Chief =

Grand Chief may refer to:

- Grand Chief, title of leader of the Grand Council of the Crees
- Grand Chief, title of leader of the Assembly of Manitoba Chiefs
- Grand Chief, title of leader of the Mi'kmaq people
- Grand Chief, title of leader of the Nishnawbe Aski Nation
- Grand Chief, title used in the Papua New Guinea honours system
