= Jane Kesno =

Papua New Guinean women's leader

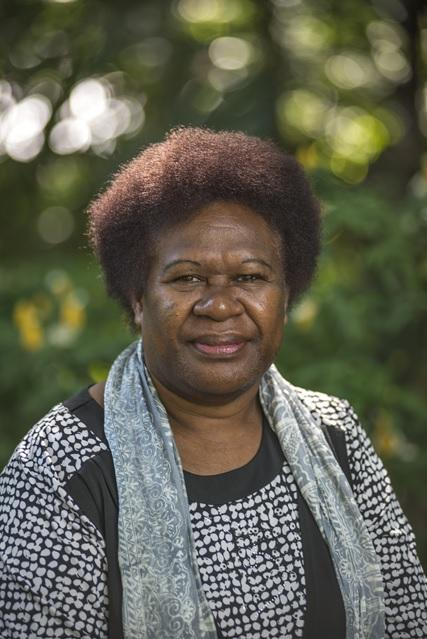
Kesno in 2018

Jane Kesno is from Papua New Guinea (PNG). She is the founder and chair of the PNG Women and Children's Rights Centre and co-founder of the Coalition of Public Sector Women in Leadership (Papua New Guinea). She is a member of the board of the Australian Aid project, Pacific Women Shaping Pacific Development.

== Early life ==
Jane Kesno comes from the Namatanai District of the New Ireland Province of PNG. Her undergraduate studies were at the University of Papua New Guinea. With an Australian government scholarship, she obtained a master's degree in social planning and development at the University of Queensland.

== Career ==
From 1985 to 2000, Kesno worked in the PNG public service. She was appointed as head of the Women's Division and then, in 1999, director of the Office of Home Affairs (now known as the Department of Community Development). Kesno subsequently joined the "PNG-Australia Law and Justice Sector Program" as a Gender Equity and Social Inclusion specialist.

In 2002, she was the co-ordinator of the women's section of the newly formed PNG People's Labour Party and was active in trying to increase the number of women in parliament. While president of the Namatanai District Council of Women, Kesno was a candidate for the Namatanai District in the 2012 Papua New Guinean general election but failed to be elected. Since that time, she has undertaken a range of community development and research work with NGOs, consulting companies and international agencies. She has been a major supporter of the "PNG National Public Service Male Advocacy Network for Women's Human Rights and the Elimination of all forms of violence against Women and Girls", which aims to train and help men to support women's equality, human rights, and access to justice and support services.

== See also ==
- Women's rights in Papua New Guinea
