= Papua New Guinea at the 2020 Summer Paralympics =

- Flag of Papua New Guinea
- IPC code: PNG
- NPC: Papua New Guinea Paralympic Committee

in Tokyo, Japan August 24, 2021 – September 5, 2021
- Competitors: 2 (1 man and 1 woman) in 1 sport and 2 events
- Flag bearers: Nelly Ruth Leva; Morea Mararos
- Medals: Gold 0 Silver 0 Bronze 0 Total 0

Summer Paralympics appearances (overview)
- 1984; 1988–1996; 2000; 2004; 2008; 2012; 2016; 2020; 2024

Papua New Guinea competed at the 2020 Summer Paralympics in Tokyo, Japan, which took place from 24 August to 5 September 2021. This was their sixth appearance at the Summer Paralympics. The Papua New Guinean team consisted of 2 athletes competing in 1 sport.

== Competitors ==
The following is the list of number of competitors participating in the Games.

Sport	Men	Women	Total
Athletics	1	1	2
Total	1	1	2

== Athletics ==
Field

Athlete	Event	Final	
Athlete	Event	Result	Rank
Nelly Ruth Leva	Women's javelin throw F46	23.30	11
Morea Mararos	Men's javelin throw F34	21.11 AR	10

== See also ==
- Papua New Guinea at the Paralympics
- Papua New Guinea at the 2020 Summer Olympics
