= Boxing at the 2016 Summer Olympics – Men's lightweight =

Men's lightweight boxing at the Games of the XXXI Olympiad
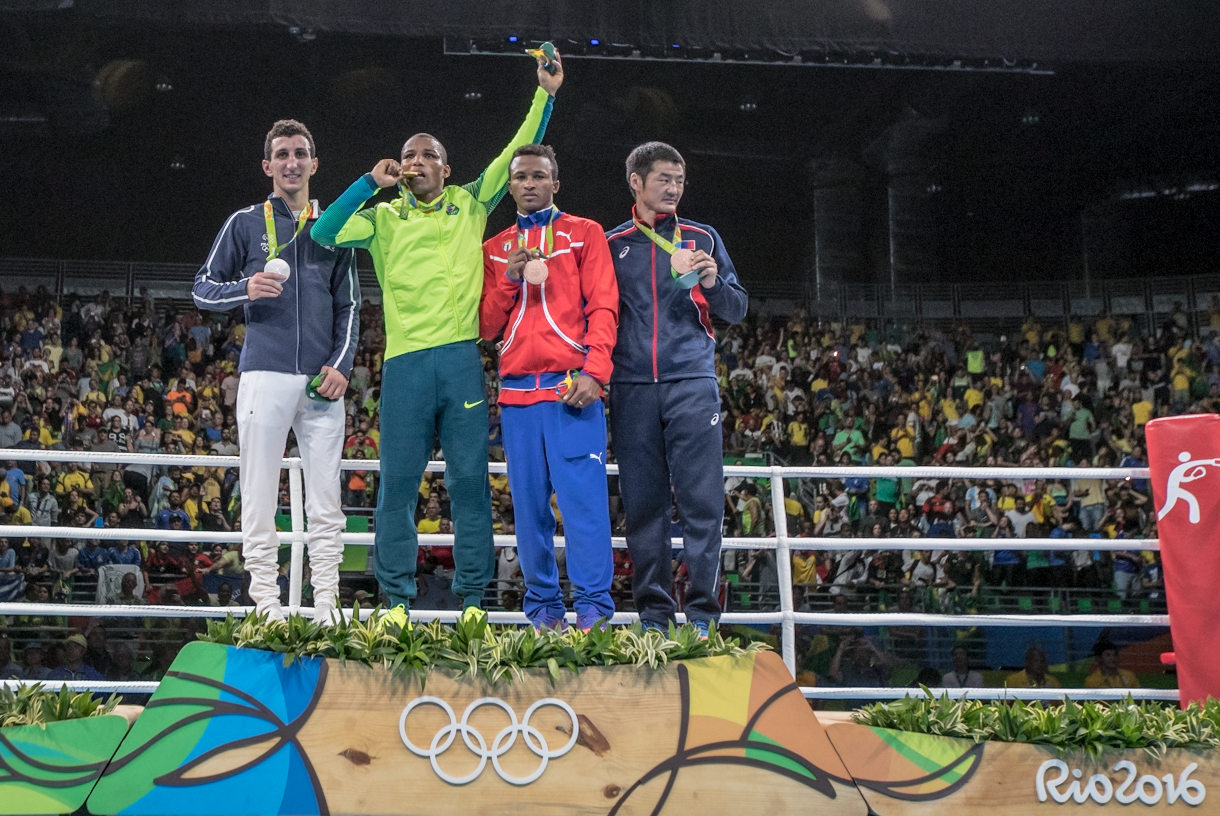
- Medalists
- Venue: Riocentro – Pavilion 6
- Date: 6–16 August 2016
- Competitors: 28 from 28 nations

Medalists
1st place, gold medalist(s)		Robson Conceição	Brazil
2nd place, silver medalist(s)		Sofiane Oumiha	France
3rd place, bronze medalist(s)		Lázaro Álvarez	Cuba
3rd place, bronze medalist(s)		Dorjnyambuugiin Otgondalai	Mongolia

The men's lightweight boxing competition at the 2016 Summer Olympics in Rio de Janeiro was held from 6–16 August at the Riocentro.

== Schedule ==
All times are Brasília Time (UTC−3).

Date	Time	Round
Saturday 6 August 2016	11:45 & 17:45	Round of 32
Sunday 7 August 2016	11:00 & 17:00	Round of 32
Tuesday 9 August 2016	11:00 & 17:00	Round of 16
Friday 12 August 2016	12:30 & 18:00	Quarter-finals
Sunday 14 August 2016	12:30 & 18:30	Semi-finals
Tuesday 16 August 2016	19:15	Final

== Results ==
=== Finals ===
Semi-finals
Lázaro Álvarez (CUB)	0
Robson Conceição (BRA)	3
Dorjnyambuugiin Otgondalai (MGL)	0
Sofiane Oumiha (FRA)	3

Final
Robson Conceição (BRA)	3
Sofiane Oumiha (FRA)	0

=== Top half ===
Round of 32
Lindolfo Delgado (MEX)	0
Carmine Tommasone (ITA)	3
Luis Angel Cabrera (VEN)	1
Daisuke Narimatsu (JPN)	2
Berik Abdrakhmanov (KAZ)	0
Carlos Balderas (USA)	3
Hurshid Tojibaev (UZB)	3
Hakan Erşeker (QAT)	0
Charly Suarez (PHI)	1
Joseph Cordina (GBR)	2
Anvar Yunusov (TJK)	3
Shan Jun (CHN)	0

Round of 16
Lázaro Álvarez (CUB)	3
Carmine Tommasone (ITA)	0
Daisuke Narimatsu (JPN)	0
Carlos Balderas (USA)	3
Hurshid Tojibaev (UZB)	2
Joseph Cordina (GBR)	0
Anvar Yunusov (TJK)
Robson Conceição (BRA)	TKO

Quarter-finals
Lázaro Álvarez (CUB)	3
Carlos Balderas (USA)	0
Hurshid Tojibaev (UZB)	0
Robson Conceição (BRA)	3

Semi-finals
Lázaro Álvarez (CUB)	0
Robson Conceição (BRA)	3

=== Bottom half ===
Round of 32
Enrico Lacruz (NED)	2
Lai Chu-en (TPE)	1
Thadius Katua (PNG)	0
Adlan Abdurashidov (RUS)	3
Mahmoud Abdelaal (EGY)	0
Reda Benbaziz (ALG)	3
Sofiane Oumiha (FRA)	3
Teófimo López (HON)	0
Amnat Ruenroeng (THA)	3
Ignacio Perrin (ARG)	0
David Joyce (IRL)	3
Andrique Allisop (SEY)	0

Round of 16
Dorjnyambuugiin Otgondalai (MGL)	2
Enrico Lacruz (NED)	1
Adlan Abdurashidov (RUS)	0
Reda Benbaziz (ALG)	3
Sofiane Oumiha (FRA)	TKO
Amnat Ruenroeng (THA)
David Joyce (IRL)	0
Albert Selimov (AZE)	3

Quarter-finals
Dorjnyambuugiin Otgondalai (MGL)	3
Reda Benbaziz (ALG)	0
Sofiane Oumiha (FRA)	3
Albert Selimov (AZE)	0

Semi-finals
Dorjnyambuugiin Otgondalai (MGL)	0
Sofiane Oumiha (FRA)	3
