= Papua New Guinea at the 2024 Summer Paralympics =

- Flag of Papua New Guinea
- IPC code: PNG
- NPC: Papua New Guinea Paralympic Committee

in Paris, France August 28, 2024 – September 8, 2024
- Competitors: 2 (1 man and 1 woman) in 1 sport and 2 events
- Flag bearers: Herea Loi; Manega Tapari
- Medals: Gold 0 Silver 0 Bronze 0 Total 0

Summer Paralympics appearances (overview)
- 1984; 1988–1996; 2000; 2004; 2008; 2012; 2016; 2020; 2024

Papua New Guinea competed at the 2024 Summer Paralympics in Paris, France, from 28 August to 8 September 2024. This was their seventh appearance at the Summer Paralympics.

== Competitors ==
The following is the list of number of competitors participating in the Games.

| Sport | Men | Women | Total |
|---|---|---|---|
| Taekwondo | 1 | 1 | 2 |
| Total | 1 | 1 | 2 |

== Taekwondo ==
Papua New Guinea qualified two athletes to compete at the Paralympics competition, all of which had achieved the qualification standards at the 2024 Oceanian Qualification Tournament in Honiara, Solomon Islands, in April 2024.

| Athlete | Event | Preliminary round | First round | Quarterfinals | Semifinals | Repechage | Final / BM | |
| Athlete | Event | Opposition Result | Opposition Result | Opposition Result | Opposition Result | Opposition Result | Opposition Result | Rank |
|---|---|---|---|---|---|---|---|---|
| Herea Loi | Men's −70 kg | — | García López (MEX); L 0–19 | Did not advance | | | | |
| Manega Tapari | Women's +65 kg | Kimoto (CAF); W 16–10 | Moreno (ESP); L 6–35 | Did not advance | | | | |

== See also ==
- Papua New Guinea at the Paralympics
- Papua New Guinea at the 2024 Summer Olympics
