= Jane Mogina =

Papua New Guinean biodiversity specialist

- Born: Papua New Guinea (PNG)
- Education: University of Papua New Guinea; Monash University; Australian National University
- Occupation: Ethnobiologist
- Known for: Mama Graun Conservation Trust

Jane Mogina is a Papua New Guinea biodiversity specialist. After working as a lecturer at the University of Papua New Guinea, she became the executive director of the Mama Graun Conservation Trust before, in 2012, joining ExxonMobil as a biodiversity adviser. In 2017, a previously unknown damselfly was discovered as a result of her company's biodiversity monitoring and was named Nososticta moginae, after her.

== Education ==
Between 1979 and 1982 Mogina studied for a BSc. in botany and plant biology at the University of Papua New Guinea, following this up with a Diploma in education from the same university. In 1988–89 she completed a Master's in educational studies at Monash University in Melbourne, Australia. In 2001, she obtained a PhD. in Community Resource Management and Ethnobiology from the Australian National University (ANU) in Canberra.

== Career ==
Between 1998 and 2006, Mogina was a lecturer at the University of Papua New Guinea. In 2006, she became the executive director of the Mama Graun Conservation Trust Fund, which worked in PNG to support biodiversity conservation and related sustainable development. From 2008, Mogina oversaw the extension of the activities of Mama Graun to the rest of Melanesia. The NGO is supported by the David and Lucile Packard Foundation, The Nature Conservancy, the German Government, USAID, the World Wide Fund for Nature, Australian Aid, Conservation International, and others. It has worked closely with the Coral Triangle Initiative and on turtle protection, among other areas.

Mama Graun signed an agreement with Esso Highlands Limited, now ExxonMobil, to support conservation education and technical capacity building for its PNGLNG project, in partnership with the University of Papua New Guinea and PNG's Institute of Biological Resources. The PNGLNG operation extends from the Highlands Region, including the Western and Southern Highlands Provinces, and Hela, and Gulf Provinces in the north, to the Central Province near Port Moresby. The five key PNG LNG facilities are the LNG Plant near Port Moresby, the Hides Gas Conditioning Plant, a series of production wells, approximately 800 kilometers of pipelines, and Komo airfield. Later, in 2012, Mogina joined ExxonMobil as its Senior Biodiversity Adviser. In 2017, she, Mama Graun and ExxonMobil collaborated with the University of Papua New Guinea to introduce a certificate programme in biodiversity conservation, with the first 42 students, who were already involved in community activities, graduating in 2020.

In mid-2017, a species of damselfly was discovered in the Gulf Province as a result of the PNGLNG project's biodiversity monitoring. This species was named Nososticta moginae, after Mogina, in light of her role in the discovery of the new species.
