= Papua New Guinea at the 2000 Summer Paralympics =

- IPC code: PNG
- NPC: Papua New Guinea Paralympic Committee

in Sydney
- Competitors: 3 in 2 sports
- Medals: Gold 0 Silver 0 Bronze 0 Total 0

Summer Paralympics appearances (overview)
- 1984; 1988–1996; 2000; 2004; 2008; 2012; 2016; 2020; 2024

Papua New Guinea competed at the 2000 Summer Paralympics in Sydney.

The country's representatives were Kupuni Lewa in weightlifting, Ben Thoedore (who is visually impaired) in the men's javelin, and Dona Ou (also visually impaired) in the men's 1500m race in athletics.

Lewa lifted 125 kg in the men's 56 kg division.

== See also ==
- 2000 Summer Paralympics
- Papua New Guinea at the Paralympics
- Papua New Guinea at the 2000 Summer Olympics
