= Weightlifting at the 2020 Summer Olympics – Women's 49 kg =

Women's 49 kg at the Games of the XXXII Olympiad
- Venue: Tokyo International Forum
- Date: 24 July 2021
- Competitors: 14 from 14 nations
- Winning total: 210 kg OR

Medalists
1st place, gold medalist(s)		Hou Zhihui	China
2nd place, silver medalist(s)		Saikhom Mirabai Chanu	India
3rd place, bronze medalist(s)		Windy Cantika Aisah	Indonesia

The women's 49 kg weightlifting competitions at the 2020 Summer Olympics in Tokyo took place on 24 July at the Tokyo International Forum.

China's Hou Zhihui, India's Saikhom Mirabai Chanu and Indonesia's Windy Cantika Aisah won the gold, silver and bronze medals, respectively. In group B, Ludia Montero of Cuba, Beatriz Pirón of the Dominican Republic, Dika Toua of Papua New Guinea, Natasha Rosa Figueiredo of Brazil, and Mauritius' Roilya Ranaivosoa earn their places in the top 14.

The bouquets were presented by IWF Delegate Sam Coffa (Olympian in weightlifting, Australia), and medals were presented by IOC Member Juan Antonio Samaranch Salisachs (Spain).

== Background ==
Two lifters from 2016 Olympics - Chanu, Ranaivosoa, Pirón and Japan's Hiromi Miyake (bronze medallist) - returned for the event. Facing with new lifters, they were split into A and B groups.

During the snatch, Chinese Taipei's Fang Wan-ling cleans in all attempts, while Miyake could only complete with one lift (74 kg). France's Anaïs Michel takes up 78 kg total lifting, misses out 80 kg on her last attempt. Belgium's Nina Sterckx lifting only 81 kg, missing out first and last attempts. Aisah also receives the same fate as Sterckx, lifting only 87 kg. America's Jourdan Delacruz lifting 83 kg and 86 kg, misses 89 kg, totalling 86 kg. Hou and Chanu competes to determine who will lead after snatch. With the latter failed on the final attempt (89 kg), the Chinese leads up, totalling 94 kg, sweeps up all clean attempts.

In group B, Papua New Guinea's Dika Toua shows up first. She completes snatch with 72 kg lifting, missed out the final attempt. Ranaivosoa succeeds, lifting only 73 kg. Figueiredo lifting 78 kg, only missing 80 kg on the final attempt. Pirón lifts 81 kg, failing in third attempt. Cuba's Ludia Montero completes snatch with total lifting 82 kg. Russia's Kristina Sobol fails in all attempts, and was eliminated from the event.

In clean and jerk, by the group A, Michel came first, lifting 96 kg on the first attempt. Fang follows the suit, lifting 98 kg. Prior to this, the officials inspects the worn lifting belts she applies to ensure it still can be used, before giving green light to her to proceed. Sterckx then lifts 99 kg, the only weight she can lift; over the last two attempts, she failed to accomplish, sits her at 5th place. Miyake, meanwhile, fails in all three attempts. She became the second to eliminated after Sobol, ending her career in bitter farewell. Michel shows again, lifting 78 kg, the two lifts she can apply; she failed on the last attempt (80 kg). Fang comes again, lifting 101 kg, the heaviest lift she record; on the last attempt (103 kg), she became less stronger, kneels on the platform and the barbell turns backwards. She ends attempt in exasperated and dismay feelings; her total lifting calculated at 181 kg. Aisah lifts first weight (103 kg), in which she managed. Michel cames for the last attempt, but misses out 101 kg, totalling 177 kg. Delacruz fails in all three attempts, and was the third to be eliminated after Sobol and Miyake; by the final attempt, she became lost control and kneels down on the platform, like Fang. With now only Aisah, Chanu and Hou, they compete each other to determine who gets the heaviest lift for gold. With the Indian failed on the final attempt and gets silver, the gold was owned by Hou with total record of Olympic lifting 210 kg. Aisah grabs bronze with total lifting 194 kg.

In group B, with Sobol now out of competition, the total lifters down to 5. Figueiredo manages to first lifting 75 kg. Pirón also succeeds in lifting 78 kg. Ranaivosoa shows up next, attempting to lift 91 kg, in which she succeeds. Montero does the 93 kg. Pirón manages to lift 90 kg; by the next two attempts, she ends without any mistakes. With clean attempts she does, she became the only lifter from that group to do so. The total lift she takes was 176 kg. Toua only takes one lifting (95 kg). On the second attempt, Figueiredo succeeds in lifting 95 kg; by the third attempt, she failed doing so, totalling 95 kg, so does the rest of the lifters.

During the Victory Ceremony, Coffa and Samaranch awards Hou, Chanu and Aisah gold, silver and bronze medals.

== Records ==
Prior to this competition, the existing world and Olympic records were as follows.

World Record	Snatch	Hou Zhihui (CHN)	96 kg	Tashkent, Uzbekistan	17 April 2021
World Record	Clean & Jerk	Saikhom Mirabai Chanu (IND)	119 kg	Tashkent, Uzbekistan	17 April 2021
World Record	Total	Hou Zhihui (CHN)	213 kg	Tashkent, Uzbekistan	17 April 2021
Olympic Record	Snatch	Olympic Standard	89 kg	—	1 November 2018
Olympic Record	Clean & Jerk	Olympic Standard	111 kg	—	1 November 2018
Olympic Record	Total	Olympic Standard	198 kg	—	1 November 2018

== Results ==
Rank	Athlete	Nation	Group	Body weight	Snatch (kg)				Clean & Jerk (kg)				Total
Rank	Athlete	Nation	Group	Body weight	1	2	3	Result	1	2	3	Result	Total
1st place, gold medalist(s)	Hou Zhihui	China	A	49.00	88	92	94	94 OR	109	114	116	116 OR	210 OR
2nd place, silver medalist(s)	Saikhom Mirabai Chanu	India	A	48.85	84	87	~~89~~	87	110	115	~~117~~	115	202
3rd place, bronze medalist(s)	Windy Cantika Aisah	Indonesia	A	48.80	~~84~~	84	~~87~~	84	103	108	110	110	194
4	Fang Wan-ling	Chinese Taipei	A	48.65	75	78	80	80	98	101	~~103~~	101	181
5	Nina Sterckx	Belgium	A	48.75	~~81~~	81	~~84~~	81	99	~~101~~	~~101~~	99	180
6	Ludia Montero	Cuba	B	49.00	79	82	~~84~~	82	93	96	~~100~~	96	178
7	Anaïs Michel	France	A	48.90	76	78	~~80~~	78	96	99	~~101~~	99	177
8	Beatriz Pirón	Dominican Republic	B	49.00	78	81	~~83~~	81	90	93	95	95	176
9	Natasha Rosa Figueiredo	Brazil	B	48.95	75	78	~~80~~	78	90	95	~~100~~	95	173
10	Dika Toua	Papua New Guinea	B	48.95	69	72	~~76~~	72	~~95~~	95	~~100~~	95	167
11	Roilya Ranaivosoa	Mauritius	B	48.95	73	~~76~~	~~76~~	73	91	~~95~~	~~96~~	91	164
—	Jourdan Delacruz	United States	A	48.90	83	86	~~89~~	86	~~108~~	~~108~~	~~108~~	—	—
—	Hiromi Miyake	Japan	A	48.90	74	~~76~~	~~76~~	74	~~99~~	~~99~~	~~99~~	—	—
—	Kristina Sobol	ROC	B	49.00	~~80~~	~~80~~	~~81~~	—	—	—	—	—	DNF

== New records ==
Snatch	92 kg	Hou Zhihui (CHN)	OR
Snatch	94 kg	Hou Zhihui (CHN)	OR
Clean & Jerk	114 kg	Hou Zhihui (CHN)	OR
Clean & Jerk	115 kg	Mirabai Chanu (IND)	OR
Clean & Jerk	116 kg	Hou Zhihui (CHN)	OR
Total	203 kg	Hou Zhihui (CHN)	OR
Total	208 kg	Hou Zhihui (CHN)	OR
Total	210 kg	Hou Zhihui (CHN)	OR
