= Florence Bundu =

Papuan sportswoman and activist (died 2009)

Personal information
- Other names: Florence Maroroa
- Born: Papua New Guinea
- Died: December 26, 2009
- Education: Queensland University of Technology; University of Papua New Guinea

Sport
- Sport: Basketball; Softball

Florence Bundu (died December 26, 2009) was a sportswoman and HIV/AIDS activist from Papua New Guinea (PNG). She is known for playing and coaching women's basketball and softball, as well as being chairperson of the Papua New Guinea Olympic Committee.

== Early life ==
Bundu attended Sogeri National High School in Sogeri, Central Province, graduating in 1974.

Bundu held an Education degree from the University of Papua New Guinea, an Applied Science degree (in human movement studies) from the Queensland University of Technology, and a diploma in teaching physical education from the National Institute of Sport.

== Sports career ==
Bundu began her sporting career by playing in women's basketball and softball teams in Papua New Guinea. She was part of the Demons softball team, and later the Kapit softball team, during the 1970s. On the Kapit team, she played alongside her sister, Veronica Bundu. She was a left-handed pitcher, and in 1980, she also became the Daikin Kapit team captain.

Also during the 1970s, Bundu was part of the Medics women's basketball team, and later the National Capital District basketball team. In 1979, Bundu played for the PNG women's basketball team at the South Pacific Games in Suva, Fiji.

Later, Bundu began coaching sports professionally. In 1998, Bundu visited the Australian Institute of Sport in Canberra, Australia, as part of a cultural exchange program organised with the Australian Department of Foreign Affairs. At the time, she was working with the National Sports Institute of PNG to promote basketball in Papua New Guinea, and was also the only full-time basketball coach in PNG.

Bundu was chairperson of the Papua New Guinea Olympic Committee. She was also the senior vice president of the PNG Sports Federation, chairperson of Women In Sports, and deputy chairperson of the PNG HIV Prevention through Sport committee.

== HIV/AIDS activism ==
Bundu authored journal articles and communicated with academics about HIV prevention in Papua New Guinea.

In her role as deputy chairperson of the PNG HIV Prevention through Sport committee, which she held until her death, she was involved mostly in teaching HIV awareness in Madang and Mount Hagen.

== Death and legacy ==
On December 26, 2009, Bundu's friend and colleague Emily Taule of the PNG Netball Federation made the announcement that Bundu had died following an asthma attack. Bundu did not have an asthma inhaler available when the attack began, and although her daughter, Jenny, retrieved an inhaler from Bundu's home, Bundu died in the vehicle on the way to hospital. Bundu's family received public condolences from various individuals and organisations throughout the Pacific, including the Cook Islands Sports and National Olympic Committee.

Her funeral was held at the Reverend Siomi Kami Memorial Church in Port Moresby. Multiple people gave eulogies, including Sir John Dawanicura (secretary-general of the PNG Sports Federation) and Emily Taule from the PNG Netball Federation.

The HIV Prevention through Sport committee dedicated their toolkit for HIV awareness to Bundu.
