= Papua New Guinea at the 1984 Summer Paralympics =

- IPC code: PNG
- NPC: Papua New Guinea Paralympic Committee

in Stoke Mandeville/New York
- Competitors: 4 in 1 sport
- Medals: Gold 0 Silver 0 Bronze 0 Total 0

Summer Paralympics appearances (overview)
- 1984; 1988–1996; 2000; 2004; 2008; 2012; 2016; 2020; 2024

Papua New Guinea competed at the 1984 Summer Paralympics in Stoke Mandeville and New York City. It was the country's first participation in the Paralympic Games. Papua New Guinea was represented by four athletes, all competing in track and field. None won any medals.

== See also ==
- 1984 Summer Paralympics
- Papua New Guinea at the Paralympics
- Papua New Guinea at the 1984 Summer Olympics
