= George Manuhu =

Judge of the Supreme Court of Papua New Guinea

Judge of the Supreme Court of Papua New Guinea for Port Moresby
- Incumbent
- Assumed office 2005

Personal details
- Education: law degree
- Alma mater: University of Papua New Guinea

George Sulai Manuhu CSM is a judge of the Supreme Court of Papua New Guinea for Port Moresby. He was Chief Magistrate of Papua New Guinea before he was appointed to the court. He was also a lawyer with the Public Solicitors Office for four years and was a District Court Magistrate for 11 years. He was appointed to the position in 2005, and had his ten-year term renewed on June 4, 2015.

== Biography ==
Manuhu is a Christian. In 2017, he was awarded the Companion of the Order of the Star of Melanesia. He attended primary school at Vorei Primary School, and high school at Manus High School. He took a four-year law degree from the University of Papua New Guinea, graduating in 1987.
