= Papua New Guinea at the 2008 Summer Paralympics =

- IPC code: PNG
- NPC: Papua New Guinea Paralympic Committee

in Beijing
- Competitors: 2 in 1 sport
- Flag bearer: Francis Kompaon
- Medals Ranked 63rd: Gold 0 Silver 1 Bronze 0 Total 1

Summer Paralympics appearances (overview)
- 1984; 1988–1996; 2000; 2004; 2008; 2012; 2016; 2020; 2024

Papua New Guinea sent a delegation to compete at the 2008 Summer Paralympics in Beijing. The country was represented by two athletes, Francis Kompaon and Joyleen Jeffrey, both competing in track and field. The country had requested wildcard entries, but the request was turned down by the Beijing Paralympic organisers.

Papua New Guinea was making its return to the Paralympics, having competed in 2000 but not in 2004.

== Medallists ==
Francis Kompaon won Papua New Guinea's first ever Paralympic or Olympic medal. It was the country's only medal of the Games.

Medal	Name	Sport	Event
Silver	Francis Kompaon	Athletics	Men's 100m (T46)

=== Athletics ===
Athlete	Class	Event	Heats		Final	
Athlete	Class	Event	Result	Rank	Result	Rank
Francis Kompaon	T46	Men's 100m	11.10	3 Q	11.10	2nd place, silver medalist(s)
Francis Kompaon	T46	Men's 200m	23.30	9	did not advance	
Joyleen Jeffrey	T12	Women's 100m	DSQ		did not advance	

== See also ==
- 2008 Summer Paralympics
- Papua New Guinea at the Paralympics
- Papua New Guinea at the 2008 Summer Olympics
