= Cecilia Nembou =

Dr. Cecilia Nembou
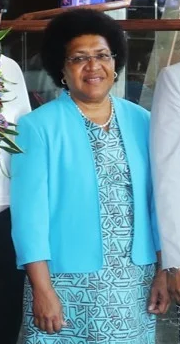
- Nembou in 2017
- Education: University of Papua New Guinea, University of Sussex, Canberra College of Advanced Education, University of New South Wales

Cecilia Nembou is an educator and women's rights advocate from Papua New Guinea.

== Background ==
Nembou trained as a mathematician, receiving a BSc in Mathematics from the University of Papua New Guinea (1975), MSc in Operations Research from the University of Sussex (1978), and PGDip in Statistics from Canberra College of Advanced Education (1983). In 1992 she received her PhD in Operations Research from the University of New South Wales.

== Career ==
In January 2016 she was appointed president and vice-chancellor of Divine Word University, making her the first female vice-chancellor for a university in Papua New Guinea. She has worked as an academic and higher education administrator for over forty years.

Prior to her appointment at Divine Word University she held positions at the University of Wollongong in Dubai and University of Papua New Guinea. She spent two years at the University of Wollongong as Academic Registrar and Assistant Professor in Mathematics. She spent twenty five years at the University of Papua New Guinea, her positions included Senior Lecturer in Mathematics, Head of Mathematics Department, Executive Dean of School of Natural and Physical Sciences, Pro-Vice-Chancellor and Acting Vice-Chancellor.

Nembou is a former board member of Coalition for Change Papua New Guinea, an advocacy group that campaigns against gender based violence. She has also lobbied for the criminalisation of domestic violence in Papua New Guinea and for the adoption of the Family Protection Act.

Academic offices
Preceded by Father Jan Czuba	Vice-Chancellor of the Divine Word University; 20 January 2016–01 January 2021	Succeeded by Father Philip Gibbs

== Publications ==
- Nembou, Cecilia. Amalgamation and affiliation in higher education in PNG. Contemporary PNG Studies: DWU Research Journal Volume 18, May 2013. 18. 70 - 81.
