= Manega Tapari =

Papua New Guinean para athlete, para badminton player, and para taekwondo competitor

Manega Tapari (born 30 April 1999) is a Papua New Guinean para athlete, para badminton player, and para taekwondo competitor. She represented Papua New Guinea in para taekwondo at the 2024 Summer Paralympics.

== Career ==
Tapari began playing para-badminton in 2022. The following year she competed at the Western Australia Para Badminton International. In October 2023 she received a female participation grant from the Badminton World Federation.

Tapari competed at the 2023 Pacific Games in the ambulant (class 6-10) javelin throw, shot put, and 100m events.

In April 2024, Tapari won in the +65kg women's para-division at the 2024 Oceania Taekwondo Olympics Qualification, earning her a spot at the Paralympics. Tapari was one of three Papua New Guinean athletes to qualify for the 2024 Summer Paralympics, and was one of the country's flag bearer's at the opening ceremony. In competition, she reached the round of 16 in the +65kg category, where she was beaten by Spanish athlete Dalia Santiago Moreno.
