= Divine Word University =

Catholic university in Papua New Guinea

- Motto: Sic currite ut comprehendatis ("Run to win")
- Type: Private
- Established: 1980
- President: Prof. Philip Gibbs
- Vice-president: Prof. Iwona Kolodziejczyk (Academic)
- Students: 3,000
- Location: Madang, Madang, Papua New Guinea
- Campus: (various)
- Website: www.dwu.ac.pg

Divine Word University is a national Catholic university in Papua New Guinea. It is one of the newest tertiary institutions in the country. It was established as a university by an Act of Parliament in 1996. The university is ecumenical and coeducational, residing under the leadership of the Divine Word Missionaries.

== History ==
Its first educational institution was Divine Word Secondary High School. In 1980, this became Divine Word Institute, established by an Act of Parliament. In 1996, the Institute adopted a formal charter and was declared Divine Word University.

It is based in Madang on the north coast of Papua New Guinea. On-site accommodation is available in DWU as well as day attendance for local students.

Divine Word University has four faculties. These are Arts and Social Sciences, Business and Informatics, Education, and Medical and Health Sciences. There was formerly a fifth faculty, the Faculty of Theology, but it has been rolled into the Faculty of Arts and Social Sciences. In 2012 the former Faculty of Flexible Learning was changed into the Flexible Learning Centre and each of its constituent departments migrated to one of the other faculties for administrative purposes. The University offers undergraduate degrees as well as Masters programs in most faculties, and the PhD. Masters and PhD programs can be done on a full-time basis or off campus in distance mode by occasional attendance and work completion.

The university is amalgamating and affiliating with a number of institutions to provide a broader base of education. In April 2002, the College of Allied Health Sciences (Madang) amalgamated and St. Benedict's Teachers College in Wewak, East Sepik Province joined in August 2003. These institutions are now campuses of DWU. In 2013, the university joined in operating Tabubil Hospital in Tabubil, Western Province.

In 2016, the university appointed Cecilia Nembou as president and vice-chancellor, the first woman to hold the position of vice-chancellor at a university in Papua New Guinea. She was succeeded by the current president, Father Phillip Gibbs, in 2021.

== Affiliations ==
- The Catholic Higher Education Association (PNG)
- The Asia-Pacific Conference of SVD-administered Universities

== Notable people ==
- John Z'graggen (former faculty member)
- Susil Nelson-Kongoi (MBA graduate)
