= Papua New Guinea at the 2012 Summer Olympics =

- IOC code: PNG
- NOC: Papua New Guinea Olympic Committee
- Website: www.pngolympic.org

in London
- Competitors: 8 in 5 sports
- Flag bearers: Toea Wisil (opening); Steven Kari (closing)
- Medals: Gold 0 Silver 0 Bronze 0 Total 0

Summer Olympics appearances (overview)
- 1976; 1980; 1984; 1988; 1992; 1996; 2000; 2004; 2008; 2012; 2016; 2020; 2024; 2028

Papua New Guinea competed at the 2012 Summer Olympics in London, from 27 July to 12 August 2012. This was the nation's ninth appearance at the Olympics. Papua New Guinea has appeared at every Summer Olympics since 1976, except the 1980 Summer Olympics in Moscow because of its partial support for the United States boycott.

Papua New Guinea Olympic Committee (PNGOC) sent a total of 8 athletes to the Games, an equal share of men and women, to compete in 5 different sports. Swimmer Ryan Pini, who competed at his third Olympics, emerged as the nation's most successful athlete in history, after finishing eighth from Beijing in the men's butterfly event. Sprinter Toea Wisil, who dominated the preliminary standings in London, was the nation's flag bearer at the opening ceremony. Among the sports played by the athletes, Papua New Guinea marked its Olympic debut in judo.

Papua New Guinea, however, has yet to win its first ever Olympic medal.

== Athletics ==
Men

Athlete	Event	Heat		Semifinal		Final	
Athlete	Event	Result	Rank	Result	Rank	Result	Rank
Nelson Stone	400 m	46.71	6	did not advance			

Women

Athlete	Event	Heat		Quarterfinal		Semifinal		Final	
Athlete	Event	Result	Rank	Result	Rank	Result	Rank	Result	Rank
Toea Wisil	100 m	11.60	1 Q	11.27	4	did not advance			

Key

- Note–Ranks given for track events are within the athlete's heat only
- Q = Qualified for the next round
- q = Qualified for the next round as a fastest loser or, in field events, by position without achieving the qualifying target
- NR = National record
- N/A = Round not applicable for the event
- Bye = Athlete not required to compete in round

== Judo ==
Papua New Guinea has qualified 1 judoka

Athlete	Event	Round of 64	Round of 32	Round of 16	Quarterfinals	Semifinals	Repechage	Final / BM	
Athlete	Event	Opposition Result	Opposition Result	Opposition Result	Opposition Result	Opposition Result	Opposition Result	Opposition Result	Rank
Raymond Ovinou	Men's −66 kg	Bye	Nazaryan (ARM); L 0000–0100	did not advance					

== Swimming ==
One swimmer from Papua New Guinea had further achieved qualifying standards in one event at the Olympic Qualifying Time (OQT). Papua New Guinea also has gained two "Universality places" from the FINA.

Men

Athlete	Event	Heat		Semifinal		Final	
Athlete	Event	Time	Rank	Time	Rank	Time	Rank
Ryan Pini	100 m butterfly	52.68	24	did not advance			

Women

Athlete	Event	Heat		Semifinal		Final	
Athlete	Event	Time	Rank	Time	Rank	Time	Rank
Judith Meauri	50 m freestyle	27.84	47	did not advance			

== Taekwondo ==
Papua New Guinea has qualified one quota place in Taekwondo.

Athlete	Event	Round of 16	Quarterfinals	Semifinals	Repechage	Bronze Medal	Final	
Athlete	Event	Opposition Result	Opposition Result	Opposition Result	Opposition Result	Opposition Result	Opposition Result	Rank
Theresa Tona	Women's −49 kg	Kasahara (JPN); L 0–12 PTG	did not advance					

== Weightlifting ==
Papua New Guinea has earned a quota in the men's and women's event.

Athlete	Event	Snatch		Clean & Jerk		Total	Rank
Athlete	Event	Result	Rank	Result	Rank	Total	Rank
Steven Kari	Men's −85 kg	140	18	180	15	320	15
Dika Toua	Women's −53 kg	79	15	95	14	174	14
