= University of Papua New Guinea =

Coordinates: 9.407°S 147.170°E

- Motto: To be dedicated to the pursuit, advancement and dissemination of knowledge, understanding and wisdom
- Type: Public
- Established: 1965; 61 years ago
- Affiliations: ACU; ASAIHL
- Chancellor: Sir Robert Igara
- Vice-Chancellor: Professor Ian Findlay
- Students: 15,000
- Location: Port Moresby, National Capital District, Papua New Guinea
- Campus: Waigani main campus and Taurama Medical Faculty
- Website: www.upng.ac.pg

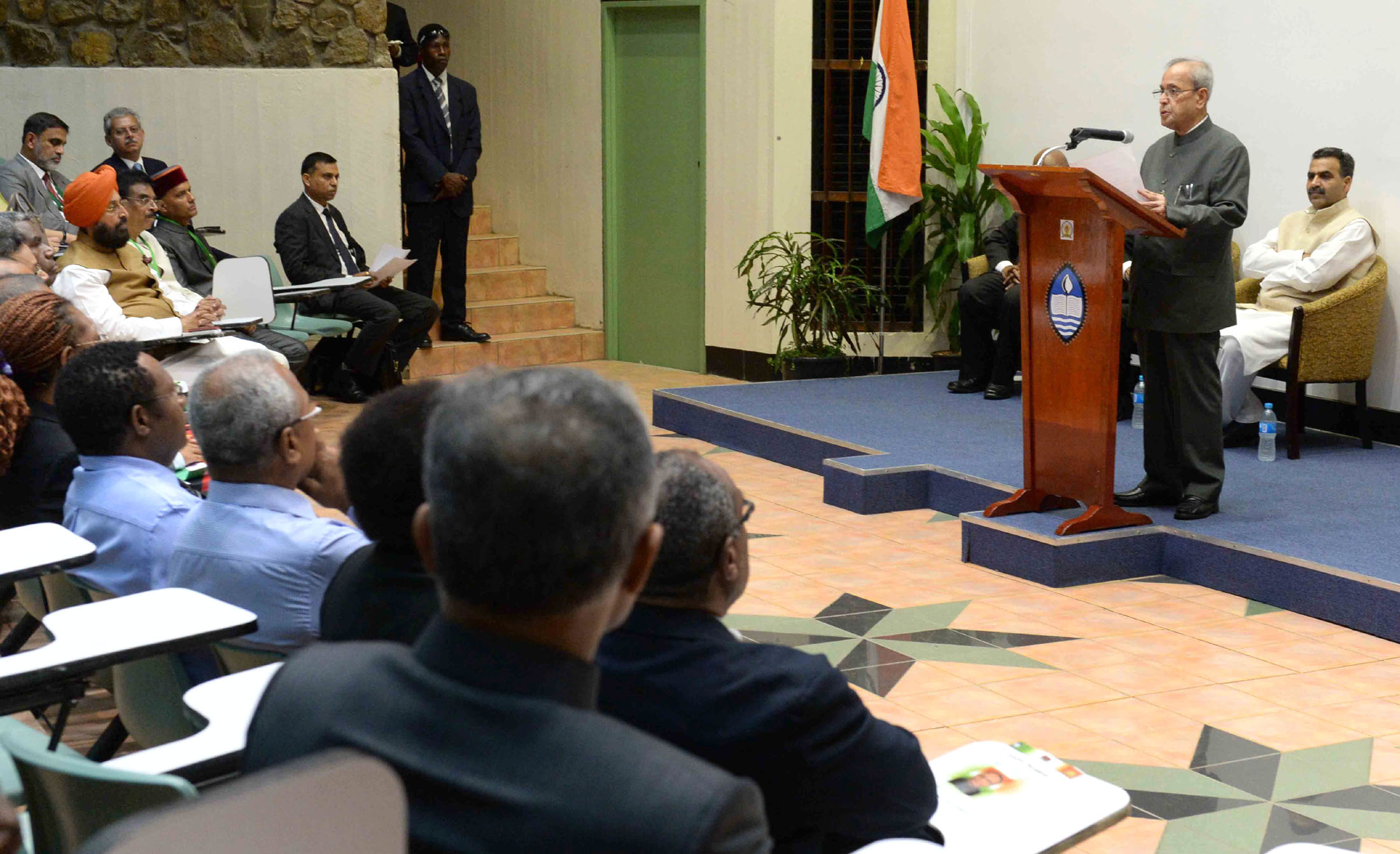
The President of India, Shri Pranab Mukherjee speaking at the University of Papua New Guinea

The University of Papua New Guinea (UPNG) is a university located in Port Moresby, capital of Papua New Guinea. It was established by ordinance of the Australian administration in 1965. This followed the Currie Commission which had enquired into higher education in Papua New Guinea. The University of Papua New Guinea Act No. 18, 1983 bill repealing the old Ordinance was passed by the National Parliament in August 1983.

The university has moved from a departmental to a school structure to foster interdisciplinary and inter-school relationships. The university's library is known as the Michael Somare Library, named after the country's first Prime Minister Sir Michael Somare. Multiple sources have included it among the best universities in Papua New Guinea.

== History ==
The first students at UPNG were enrolled in 1966, with 58 enrolees in a preliminary course. John Gunther was the university's inaugural vice-chancellor. Degree courses commenced in 1967 with 83 students across three faculties of arts, law, and science. The university's first undergraduate degrees were awarded in August 1970 and included future prime minister Rabbie Namaliu. The university's innovative English literature and creative writing programme played a major role in the Pacific writing scene in the 1960s and 1970s.

== Infrastructure ==
In recent times, the university has seen significant changes to its ageing infrastructure with the Government of Papua New Guinea handing over the 2015 Pacific Games Village to the university for the purpose of becoming student dormitories. There are several other major infrastructure developments made in partnership with the Australian Government for a new and modern lecture theater, School of Business and Public Policy complex and a Student Services building. The Government of Papua New Guinea is also funding several projects such as School of Natural and Physical Sciences building and the newly completed School of Law complex.

== National School of Arts ==
The National School of Arts, based in Port Moresby, was amalgamated into the university in 1990. It had been established in 1972 as the Creative Arts Centre and opened a gallery in 1975. In 1976, it became the National School of Arts, and taught theatre, visual arts and music.

== Students ==
There are more than 15,000 students annually in Port Moresby campuses, five open campuses, and 13 study centres. While the majority of the students are from Papua New Guinea, there are international students from other Pacific countries, especially from the Solomon Islands, who currently study at the university. The UPNG School of Law is currently the only law school in Papua New Guinea. The School of Business and Public Policy offers MBA and Masters in Economics and Public Policy programs.

== Courses ==
There are programs in:

- Economics
- Medicine
- Pharmacy
- Health Sciences
- Physical and Natural Sciences
- Law
- Business
- Humanities
- Social Sciences
- Sustainable Development

Problem-based learning (PBL) approaches are used.

== Alumni ==
- Yolarnie Amepou, herpetologist and conservationist
- Vincent Eri, The fifth Governor General of Papua New Guinea
- Henry Kila, former president of the Papua New Guinea Olympic Committee
- Salamo Injia, former Chief Justice of Papua New Guinea
- George Manuhu, judge of the Supreme Court of Papua New Guinea
- Kalkot Mataskelekele, President of Vanuatu
- Jane Mogina, biodiversity specialist
- Mekere Morauta, former Prime Minister of Papua New Guinea
- Hank Nelson, Australian historian
- Cecilia Nembou, educator, women's rights activist, and first female vice-chancellor for a university in Papua New Guinea
- Peter O'Neill, Former Prime Minister of Papua New Guinea
- Powes Parkop, governor for National Capital District
- Gibbs Salika, Chief Justice of Papua New Guinea
- Paias Wingti, former Prime Minister of Papua New Guinea
- Jeremiah Manele, Prime Minister of the Solomon Islands
- Florence Bundu, former chairperson of the Papua New Guinea Olympic Committee

== Affiliation ==
- Association of Commonwealth Universities
