= Carlos Balderas =

American boxer (born 1996)

Personal information
- Nickname: Karlos
- Born: August 24, 1996 (age 30) Lompoc, California, U.S.
- Height: 1.75 m (5 ft 9 in)
- Weight: lightweight

Boxing career
- Reach: 1.85 m (73 in)
- Stance: Orthodox

Boxing record
- Total fights: 16
- Wins: 14
- Win by KO: 12
- Losses: 2

Carlos Zenon Balderas Jr. (born August 24, 1996) is an American boxer who competed at the 2016 Summer Olympics.

== Personal life ==
Balderas was born on June 24, 1996, in Lompoc, California. He was the first member of his family to be born in the United States; his grandfather first came to California, leaving his wife and children behind in Oaxaca, Mexico, to work in strawberry fields, eventually earning the money to move the rest of the family to the United States. Whilst growing up in Santa Maria, California, Balderas was first taken to a boxing gym as a punishment for fighting in the streets with his friends and getting suspended from school. His older brother Jose is also a boxer.

== Career ==
Balderas is coached by his father Zenon and his uncle David.

In December 2014, Balderas won the lightweight division of the US National Team Trials, qualifying him for the 2015 Pan American Games held in Toronto, Ontario, Canada, where he received a first round bye and was defeated in the quarterfinals by Lindolfo Delgado of Mexico. Balderas represented the USA Knockouts in the World Series of Boxing (WSB). In 2015 he took part in five bouts, defeating Fabio Introvaia of Italy, Dawid Michelus of Poland, Brian Nunez of Argentina and Adrian Javier Martinez Morales of Puerto Rico but losing to Azerbaijan's Albert Selimov. In 2016 he won his first two bouts against Lindolfo Delgado and Moroccan Hamza Rabii.

He qualified for the men's lightweight event at the 2016 Summer Olympics in Rio de Janeiro Brazil via his results in the WSB where he won the gold medal in his elite division and was named Outstanding Boxer of the event. Balderas was given his Olympic allocation by the International Boxing Association (AIBA) after two of the athletes ahead of him in the final WSB rankings instead qualified for the Olympics through the 2015 World Championships. Balderas won his first two Olympic matches but lost in the quarterfinals to Cuban finalist Lázaro Álvarez. On April 9, 2017, he won his pro debut by first-round TKO.

== Professional boxing record ==
15 fights	14 wins	1 loss
By knockout	12	1
By decision	2	0

No.	Result	Record	Opponent	Type	Round, time	Date	Location	Notes
15	Win	14-1	(Mexico) Esteban Sanchez	TKO	8 (8), 1:02	Nov 12, 2022	(United States) Palms Casino Resort, Las Vegas, U.S.	
14	Win	13–1	(Colombia) Ruben Cervera	UD	6	May 21, 2022	(United States) Resorts World Las Vegas, Las Vegas, Nevada, U.S.	
13	Win	12–1	(Brazil) Aelio Mesquita	KO	2 (6), 0:38	Mar 4, 2022	(United States) Save Mart Center, Fresno, California, U.S.	
12	Win	11–1	(Ecuador) Julio Cortez	TKO	4 (6), 2:13	Nov 20, 2021	(United States) Michelob Ultra Arena, Paradise, Nevada, U.S.	
11	Win	10–1	(United States) Fidel Cervantes	TKO	2 (6), 2:03	Aug 14, 2021	(United States) Tulsa, Oklahoma, U.S.	
10	Loss	9–1	(Mexico) Rene Tellez Giron	KO	6 (8), 0:10	21 Dec 2019	(United States) Toyota Arena, Ontario, California, U.S.	
9	Win	9–0	(United States) Robert Frankel	TKO	7 (8), 1:34	13 Jul 2019	(United States) Minneapolis Armory, Minneapolis, Minnesota, U.S.	
8	Win	8–0	(Mexico) Luis May	KO	4 (8), 1:07	20 Apr 2019	(United States) Dignity Health Sports Park, Carson, California, U.S.	
7	Win	7–0	(Mexico) Jose Cen Torres	RTD	3 (6), 3:00	16 Feb 2019	(United States) Microsoft Theater, Los Angeles, California, U.S.	
6	Win	6–0	(Mexico) Giovanni Caro	KO	4 (6), 2:09	28 Jul 2018	(United States) Staples Center, Los Angeles, California, U.S.	
5	Win	5–0	(United States) Alex Silva	KO	1 (6), 2:25	9 Jun 2018	(United States) Staples Center, Los Angeles, California, U.S.	
4	Win	4–0	(Mexico) Jorge Rojas Zacazontetl	UD	4	17 Feb 2018	(United States) Don Haskins Center, El Paso, Texas, U.S.	
3	Win	3–0	(Mexico) Carlos Flores	KO	1 (8), 0:32	15 Dec 2017	(United States) Pioneer Event Center, Lancaster, California, U.S.	
2	Win	2–0	(Mexico) Eder Amaro Fajardo	KO	1 (6), 1:36	30 Jul 2017	(United States) Rabobank Arena, Bakersfield, California, U.S.	
1	Win	1–0	(United States) Thomas Smith	RTD	1 (6), 3:00	9 Apr 2017	(United States) The Novo, Los Angeles, California, U.S.	
