= Papua New Guinea at the 2020 Summer Olympics =

- IOC code: PNG
- NOC: Papua New Guinea Olympic Committee
- Website: www.pngolympic.org

in Tokyo, Japan July 23, 2021 – August 8, 2021
- Competitors: 8 in 5 sports
- Flag bearers (opening): Dika Toua; Morea Baru
- Flag bearer (closing): N/A
- Medals: Gold 0 Silver 0 Bronze 0 Total 0

Summer Olympics appearances (overview)
- 1976; 1980; 1984; 1988; 1992; 1996; 2000; 2004; 2008; 2012; 2016; 2020; 2024

Papua New Guinea competed at the 2020 Summer Olympics in Tokyo. Originally scheduled to take place from 24 July to 9 August 2020, the Games were postponed to 23 July to 8 August 2021, because of the COVID-19 pandemic. It was the nation's tenth consecutive appearance at the Summer Olympics.

== Competitors ==
The following is the list of number of competitors in the Games.

Sport	Men	Women	Total
Athletics	0	1	1
Boxing	1	0	1
Sailing	1	1	2
Swimming	1	1	2
Weightlifting	1	1	2
Total	4	4	8

== Athletics ==
Papua New Guinea received a universality slot from the World Athletics to send a female track and field athlete to the Olympics.

Key

- Note–Ranks given for track events are within the athlete's heat only
- Q = Qualified for the next round
- q = Qualified for the next round as a fastest loser or, in field events, by position without achieving the qualifying target
- NR = National record
- N/A = Round not applicable for the event
- Bye = Athlete not required to compete in round

Field events

Athlete	Event	Qualification		Final	
Athlete	Event	Distance	Position	Distance	Position
Rellie Kaputin	Women's long jump	6.40	19	Did not advance	

== Boxing ==
Papua New Guinea received an invitation from the Tripartite Commission to send the men's lightweight boxer John Ume to the Olympics.

Athlete	Event	Round of 32	Round of 16	Quarterfinals	Semifinals	Final	
Athlete	Event	Opposition Result	Opposition Result	Opposition Result	Opposition Result	Opposition Result	Rank
John Ume	Men's lightweight	Garside (AUS); L 0–5	Did not advance				

== Sailing ==
Papua New Guinean sailors qualified one boat in each of the following classes through the class-associated World Championships, and the continental regattas, marking the country's recurrence to the sport for the first time in 28 years.

Athlete	Event	Race											Net points	Final rank
Athlete	Event	1	2	3	4	5	6	7	8	9	10	M*	Net points	Final rank
Teariki Numa	Men's Laser	~~35~~	35	35	35	35	34	32	34	34	32	EL	306	35
Rose-Lee Numa	Women's Laser Radial	~~44~~	42	40	44	40	39	38	43	44	43	EL	373	44

M = Medal race; EL = Eliminated – did not advance into the medal race

== Swimming ==
Papua New Guinea received a universality invitation from FINA to send two top-ranked swimmers (one per gender) in their respective individual events to the Olympics, based on the FINA Points System of June 28, 2021.

Athlete	Event	Heat		Semifinal		Final	
Athlete	Event	Time	Rank	Time	Rank	Time	Rank
Ryan Maskelyne	Men's 200 m breaststroke	2:15.33	32	Did not advance			
Judith Meauri	Women's 50 m freestyle	27.56	53	Did not advance			

== Weightlifting ==
Papua New Guinea entered two weightlifters (one per gender) into the Olympic competition. Rio 2016 Olympian Morea Baru (men's 61 kg), with the veteran Dika Toua (women's 49 kg) becoming the first female from her nation to compete in five Olympics, topped the list of weightlifters from Oceania in their respective weight categories based on the IWF Absolute Continental Rankings.

Athlete	Event	Snatch		Clean & Jerk		Total	Rank
Athlete	Event	Result	Rank	Result	Rank	Total	Rank
Morea Baru	Men's −61 kg	118	12	147	10	265	10
Dika Toua	Women's −49 kg	72	13	95	9	167	10
