= Papua New Guinea at the 2024 Summer Olympics =

- IOC code: PNG
- NOC: Papua New Guinea Olympic Committee
- Website: www.pngolympic.org

in Paris, France 26 July 2024 – 11 August 2024
- Competitors: 7 (5 men and 2 women) in 5 sports
- Flag bearers: Gibson Mara & Georgia-Leigh Vele
- Medals: Gold 0 Silver 0 Bronze 0 Total 0

Summer Olympics appearances (overview)
- 1976; 1980; 1984; 1988; 1992; 1996; 2000; 2004; 2008; 2012; 2016; 2020; 2024

Papua New Guinea competed at the 2024 Summer Olympics in Paris from 26 July to 11 August 2024. It was the nation's eleventh consecutive appearance at the Summer Olympics.

== Competitors ==
The following is the list of number of competitors in the Games:

Sport	Men	Women	Total
Athletics	0	1	1
Boxing	1	0	1
Swimming	1	1	2
Taekwondo	2	0	2
Weightlifting	1	0	1
Total	5	2	7

== Athletics ==
Papua New Guinea sent one sprinter to compete at the 2024 Summer Olympics.

Key

- Note–Ranks given for track events are within the athlete's heat only
- Q = Qualified for the next round
- q = Qualified for the next round as a fastest loser or, in field events, by position without achieving the qualifying target
- NR = National record
- N/A = Round not applicable for the event
- Bye = Athlete not required to compete in round

Track events

Athlete	Event	Preliminary		Heat		Semifinal		Final	
Athlete	Event	Result	Rank	Result	Rank	Result	Rank	Result	Rank
Leonie Beu	Women's 100 m	11.63 Q	3	11.73	8	Did Not Advance			

== Boxing ==
Papua New Guinea sent one boxer to compete at the 2024 Summer Olympics.

Athlete	Event	Round of 32	Round of 16	Quarterfinals	Semifinals	Final	
Athlete	Event	Opposition Result	Opposition Result	Opposition Result	Opposition Result	Opposition Result	Rank
John Ume	Men's 63.5 kg	Erislandy Álvarez (CUB); L RSC	Did not advance				

== Swimming ==
Papua New Guinea sent two swimmers to compete at the 2024 Paris Olympics.

Athlete	Event	Heat		Semifinal		Final	
Athlete	Event	Time	Rank	Time	Rank	Time	Rank
Josh Tarere	Men's 100 m freestyle	53.85	72	Did not advance			
Georgia-Leigh Vele	Women's 50 m freestyle	27.61	44	Did not advance			

Qualifiers for the latter rounds (Q) of all events were decided on a time only basis, therefore positions shown are overall results versus competitors in all heats.

== Taekwondo ==
Papua New Guinea entered two athletes to compete at the games. Gibson Mara qualified for Paris 2024, following the triumph of winning the final match in his weight class; meanwhile Kevin Kassman failed to win the final match in his weight class, but later on confirmed that he will compete for Paris 2024, after New Zealand taekwondo fail to meet the requirements for NOC nomination. Both of them qualified through the 2024 Oceania Qualification Tournament in Honiara, Solomon Islands; signifying the nations returning to the sports after the last participation at 2016.

Athlete	Event	Qualification	Round of 16	Quarterfinals	Semifinals	Repechage	Final / BM	
Athlete	Event	Opposition Result	Opposition Result	Opposition Result	Opposition Result	Opposition Result	Opposition Result	Rank
Kevin Kassman	Men's –68 kg	Bye	Sinden (GBR); L 0–2	Did not advance				
Gibson Mara	Men's +80 kg	Mehdipournejad (EOR); L 1–2	Did not advance					

== Weightlifting ==
Papua New Guinea entered one weightlifter into the Olympic competition. Morea Baru (men's 61 kg) secured one of the top ten slots in his weight divisions based on the IWF Olympic Qualification Rankings.

Athlete	Event	Snatch		Clean & Jerk		Total	Rank
Athlete	Event	Result	Rank	Result	Rank	Total	Rank
Morea Baru	Men's −61 kg	118	7	161	5	279	5
