= Henry Kila =

Papua New Guinean sports administrator and insurance executive

Henry Raisi Kila OBE

President of the Papua New Guinea Olympic Committee
- In office 2000–2003

President, PNG Business Council
- In office 2006–2010

Personal details
- Born: 6 June 1952 Central Province (Papua New Guinea), Territory of Papua and New Guinea (now Papua New Guinea)
- Died: 4 January 2010 (aged 57)

Henry Raisi Kila (1952 – 2010) was a former president of the Papua New Guinea Sports Federation and Olympic Committee, now the Papua New Guinea Olympic Committee (PNGOC), and president of the PNG Softball Association. He was the first Papua New Guinean to obtain qualifications from the Australian Insurance Institute and went on to have a distinguished career in Papua New Guinea's insurance industry.

== Early life ==
Kila was born in Delena in the Central Province of PNG on 6 June 1952. His passion for softball started when he was in primary school at Kila Kila and Hagara in PNG's capital, Port Moresby, where the sport was played as part of physical education classes. His interest in the sport continued until his time at the University of Papua New Guinea in the late 1960s and after, when he was a founder member of the Malangan Softball Club in Port Moresby. His active involvement in the sport led to his being elected as president of the national association, and his business skills and contacts led to significant sponsorship for the sport. In addition to softball he would also become involved in football and rugby administration.

== Career ==
Kila joined the insurance industry in PNG before the country's independence in 1975, at a time when insurance was dominated by expatriates, and Papua New Guineans found themselves being treated less than equally. Helped by an outgoing personality, excellent social skills, and a well-developed sense of humour, he quickly rose through the ranks of the industry and in 1979 was granted a licence to operate his own company. However, the other insurance companies at the time informally decided to blacklist his brokerage, arguing that the company lacked professional insurance experience. Fortunately for Kila, one company broke ranks with the others and his company started to win business, and by his death had become one of the two largest insurance broking firms in PNG.

Kila's contribution to the growth of PNG as a nation was also quickly recognised outside of the insurance industry and he took leadership roles in business and in sports administration at provincial and national levels. Despite pressure to do so he was not interested in a career in politics and, instead, chose to serve in unpaid positions on business chambers, industry councils and sporting federations. He was a founding member in 1995 and president from 2006 of the PNG Business Council. He represented PNG as one of its three members of the Business Advisory Council (ABAC) of the Asia-Pacific Economic Cooperation forum. He was president of the Papua New Guinea Sports Federation and Olympic Committee from 2000 to 2003.

== Death ==
Kila died from a heart attack in Port Moresby on 4 January 2010. Among those to offer condolences was the prime minister, Michael Somare, who described his death as "great loss to the business community and the sporting fraternity of Papua New Guinea". Somare also spoke about Kila's "humble demeanour" and his role as a man who "tried to assure Papua New Guineans an equitable share in economic development".
