= Papua New Guinea at the 1996 Summer Olympics =

- IOC code: PNG
- NOC: Papua New Guinea Olympic Committee
- Website: www.pngolympic.org

in Atlanta
- Competitors: 11
- Flag bearer: Subul Babo
- Medals: Gold 0 Silver 0 Bronze 0 Total 0

Summer Olympics appearances (overview)
- 1976; 1980; 1984; 1988; 1992; 1996; 2000; 2004; 2008; 2012; 2016; 2020; 2024

Papua New Guinea competed at the 1996 Summer Olympics in Atlanta, United States.

== Results by event ==
=== Athletics ===
Men's 4 × 400 m Relay

- Samuel Bai, Ivan Wakit, Amos Ali, and Subul Babo

- Heat — 3:19.92 (→ did not advance)

Men's 400m Hurdles

- Ivan Wakit

- Heat — 53.42s (→did not advance)

=== Boxing ===
Men's Featherweight (57 kg)

- Lynch Ipera
  1. First Round — Lost to Daniel Attah (Nigeria) on points (2–14)

Men's Lightweight (60 kg)

- Henry Kunsi
  1. First Round — Lost to Agnaldo Nunez (Brazil) after referee decision (11-11)

Men's Light Welterweight (63,5 kg)

- Steven Kevi
  1. First Round — Lost to Davis Mwale (Zambia) on points (3–16)
