= John Ume =

Papua New Guinean boxer

Personal information
- Nationality: Papua New Guinean
- Born: 19 August 1996 (age 30)
- Height: 1.66 m (5 ft 5 in)
- Weight: Light welterweight

Boxing career
- Stance: Orthodox
Medal record
Men's amateur boxing
Representing Papua New Guinea
Pacific Games
Gold medal – first place	2019 Apia	Light-welterweight
Pacific Mini Games
Silver medal – second place	2017 Port Vila	Light-welterweight
Oceanian Championships
Bronze medal – third place	2017 Gold Coast	Light-welterweight

John Ume (born 19 August 1996) is a Papua New Guinean amateur boxer. He represented Papua New Guinea at the 2020 Summer Olympics.

He won a gold medal at the 2019 Pacific Games. He also competed at the 2018 Commonwealth Games.

== Career ==
Ume hails from Kairuku, Papua New Guinea, but grew up in Hohola, a suburb of the capital city of Port Moresby. After seeing video of Mike Tyson, he took up boxing as a form of self-defense in response to being bullied, initially joining the Soiki Boxing Club in 2012. The following year, Ume defeated national team captain Tom Boga by split decision at the National Capital District (NCD) trials, but Boga was still selected to represent the district at the national championships due to his experience. After moving to the Wantoks Boxing Club, the nineteen-year-old beat Boga once again at the 2015 NCD trials.

Ume was first called up to the national team in 2016 for a dual match against Fiji. Although the PNG squad lost 4–2 overall, he won his matchup against Jone Koroilagilagi convincingly for his first international victory. Ume won a bronze medal at the 2017 Oceanian Championships in Australia, then a silver medal at the 2017 Pacific Mini Games in Vanuatu, where he lost to Roy Sere of the host nation in the finals. He also suffered a quick exit at the 2018 Commonwealth Games, losing in his first match.

Ume was one of two Papua new Guinean boxers to win a gold medal at the 2019 Pacific Games in Samoa, defeating Fijian opponent Jone Davule in the final. At the 2020 Asia & Oceania Olympic Qualification Tournament, he won his first bout against Nassim Saddiq of Saudi Arabia where he forced a referee stoppage in the final round. However, Ume faced the tournament's third seed, Baatarsükhiin Chinzorig, in his next fight and lost by unanimous decision. In light of the COVID-19 pandemic, the qualification process was restructured and the final World Olympic Qualification Tournament was cancelled. Ume was subsequently awarded a spot at the delayed 2020 Summer Olympics through a tripartite invitation from the International Olympic Committee.
