= Gender inequality in Papua New Guinea =

Examples of Gender inequality in Papua New Guinea include poverty, violence, limited access to education and health care, and witch hunts. Cases of violence against women in PNG are under reported. There is also a lack of services for women who experience violence. There are reports of sexual abuse by police officers, on arrest and whilst in police custody. These incidents lack documentation or investigation, consequently, perpetrators are rarely prosecuted or punished. The government of Papua New Guinea (PNG) has introduced legislation to combat these issues, though with limited success.

Many traditional cultural practices are followed in PNG. These include polygamy, bride price, and the stereotypical roles assigned to both men and women. These cultural practices reflect deep-rooted patriarchal attitudes which reinforce the unequal status of women in many areas. These practices continue due to a lack of sustained systematic action by the government.

== Violence ==
=== Sexual and Domestic Violence ===
It is estimated that 67% of women in PNG have suffered domestic abuse and over 50% of women have been raped. This reportedly increases to 100% in the Highlands. Further studies have found that 86% of women had been beaten during pregnancy. Studies estimate that 60% of men have participated in a gang rape. A 2014 study by UN Women found that when accessing public transport more than 90% of women and girls had experienced some kind of violence.

Cases of violence against women in PNG are under reported. This is due in part to gender-based violence being socially legitimized and the accompanying culture of silence. Additionally, there is a lack of services for women who experience violence. These services include shelters, counselling and safe houses. PNG has also faced reports of sexual abuse of women by police officers. These abuses have occurred on arrest and whilst in police custody. These assaults are reportedly carried out by both police officers and male detainees. There are also reports of collective rape. These incidents lack documentation or investigation. Consequently, perpetrators are not prosecuted or punished.

=== Amnesty International report ===
Amnesty International highlights the issue of gendered violence in the Papua New Guinea 2016-2017 human rights report. This report highlights widespread violence which is experienced by women and children. The prosecution of incidents of violence is rare. This report also highlights key cultural practices which are seen as continually undermining the rights of women. These cultural practices include bride price and polygamy.

== Health ==
In Papua New Guinea, women have a higher life expectancy than men. Females have a life expectancy of 68 while males have a life expectancy of 63.

=== Maternal health ===
Accessibility to affordable and appropriate health care is an issue faced by women in PNG, particularly for women located in the outer islands. This is linked to the high rate of maternal mortality. PNG has the second-highest rate of maternal death in the Asia Pacific region. It is estimated that just over 50% of women give birth with the aid of a health facility or skilled attendant. Statistics estimate that 930 out of 100,000 live births result in a maternal death. A major cause of maternal mortality is abortion. Abortion is illegal in PNG, unless the mother's life is at risk. Illegal abortions carry a penalty of 7 years imprisonment. The criminalisation of abortion has led to women seeking clandestine, and often unsafe abortions. These illegal abortions often pose significant risks to the health and lives of women. There is a lack of data on the effect of illegal abortions on the rate of maternal deaths in PNG.

=== Sexual health and contraception ===
The CEDAR Committee has raised concerns about preventative health care for sexual and reproductive health. PNG has low rates of contraceptive use, causing high rates of teenage pregnancies and sexually transmitted infections. The universal access to contraception is supported by the PNG government. However, it is estimated that only a third of women have access to contraception.

=== Mental Health ===
There are also limited services focusing on mental health and well-being. Especially for women who require specialised care, such as those who are disabled.

== Education ==
Cultural practices and traditional attitudes often act as a barrier for women and girls trying to access education. There is a high level of harassment and sexual abuse experienced by girls in education facilities. These assaults combined with expulsion due to pregnancy, have led to a lower completion rate of girls compared to boys. There is also a lack of data available about the dropout rates, literacy rates and education enrolment rates. This lack of data makes compiling comparative analysis challenging.

For people above the age of 15, 65.63% of males and 62.81% are literate in Papua New Guinea, however for the youth, 66.3% of males and 78.79% of females are literate.

In 2002, PNG launched the Gender Equity in Education Policy. The aim of this policy was to address the gender gap which occur at all levels of education. Following this is 2005, PNG launched a 10-year education plan. There is still a lack of transparency about the education sectors budget.

The CEDAW Committee highlighted education as being fundamental for the advancement of girls and women. Restricted access to education was identified as a barrier to the full enjoyment of girl's and women's human rights.

== Customary practices ==
Many traditional customary practices are followed in PNG. These include polygamy, bride price (dava), the stereotypical roles assigned to both men and women, and the continuing custom that compensation payments can include women. These cultural practices reflect deep-rooted stereotypes and patriarchal attitudes. The CEDAW Committee commented that these cultural practices risk the perpetuation of discrimination against women, as they reinforce the unequal status of women in many areas. At this stage these stereotypical values and cultural practices continue due to a lack of sustained systematic action by PNG to modify or eliminate these practices.

=== Marriage ===
Cultural practices in relation to marriage include polygamy, bride price and early marriage. Marriages may also be forced or arranged. In rural and remote areas the traditional cultural practices remain. These practices cover marriage, dissolution, inheritance and family relations.

The PNG government announced on 22 August 2016 that an amendment will be introduced to change the country's marriage and divorce laws. The Marriage (Amendment) Bill 2015 and the Matrimonial (Clauses) Bill 2015, are likely to amend the Matrimonial (Clauses) Act 1963 and Marriage Act 1963. These amendments would set a new minimum age for marriages for both boys and girls. These amendments will introduce a fine of between K10,000[US$3200] to K20,000 [US$6400] for offenders who force minors to marry before the age of 17 years.

=== Witch hunts ===
Witch killings are an ongoing phenomenon in PNG, especially in the Highlands. The UN has estimated that 200 witch killings occur annually. The government recognises both "white magic", which involves healing and fertility, and sorcery. Sorcery or "black magic" carries a jail sentence of up to 2 years imprisonment. Witch killings tend to be carried out by groups of men and often the whole community is involved. Women and girls tend to be accused of performing witchcraft. Often the individuals targeted are vulnerable young women, or widows without sons.

In 2014, 122 people were charged following the deaths of more than seven people accused of sorcery.

The CEDAW Committee highlighted the increasing reports of the torture and killing of women and girls accused of witchcraft. These women and girls were identified as typically being vulnerable members of society, in particular older women without adult sons. The Committee also raised concerns about the lack of information on this cultural practice. To properly understand this phenomenon investigations, prosecutions and the judgments of these cases are required.

=== Leniata Legacy ===
The women's advocacy group the Leniata Legacy was founded following the murder of Kepari Leniata in 2013. Leniata was publicly tortured and burned to death after being accused of sorcery.

== UN involvement ==
=== Convention on the Elimination of All Forms of Discrimination Against Women (CEDAW) ===
PNG became a member of the United Nations in 1975. In 1995 PNG ratified CEDAW without reservations. Despite ratifying CEDAW, PNG has yet to incorporate it into domestic law. Consequently, it lacks the status of domestic law under that Act of Parliament or Constitution. In the 2010 Concluding observations of the Committee on the Elimination of Discrimination against Women focused on PNG, the Committee urged PNG to fully incorporate CEDAW in its domestic legal system. The Committee was also concerned about the awareness of the inhabitants of PNG in relation to the Convention. This concern has arisen because the Convention has not been translated into the main social languages of PNG.

=== United Nations Development Program ===
The United Nations Development Program (UNDP) is working with the UN Gender Task Team to help develop Policy on Gender Equality and Women Empowerment in Papua New Guinea. UNDP has three key areas: 1) Supporting women so that they can participate and represent in decision making, both at national and sub-national levels; 2) Giving support to initiatives which address Gender based violence; 3)To promote women's economic empowerment.

=== UN Women ===
Due to widespread violence against women, the UN Women's Strategic Plan has focused on PNG as a priority country. UN Women are focusing on the existing gender-based violence in PNG, the role of women in political developments, inter-agency coordination mechanisms, women's economic empowerment and advancing the gender equality agenda. One of the major supporters of "PNG National Public Service Male Advocacy Network for Women's Human Rights and the Elimination of all forms of violence against Women and Girls" is Jane Kesno.

== Law ==
PNG operates a plural legal system. Customary law is subordinate to the Constitution and statutory law. PNG lacks an effective system for dealing with complaints which arise from the legal system. There is also a failure to keep records of the complaints filed by women and their outcome. Furthermore, traditional apologies are still offered as a form of resolution for offences committed. This cultural practice is still performed in the context of village courts.

=== Legislation ===
Under the revised Criminal Code, the Sexual Offences and Crimes Against Children Act introduced a range of new offences. Introduced in 2002, this Act created new offences including marital rape. This was further developed to include grading according to the seriousness of harm, and the manner of sexual violation.

The Lukautim Pikinini (Child Protection) Act was adopted in 2009. This Act included provisions aimed at protecting girls from discrimination.

In 2013 the Family Protection Bill was introduced. This Bill criminalised domestic violence. Breaches of this Act can incur fines of up to k5,000 (US $1,650) and up to 2 years imprisonment. Since the introduction of this Bill there has been no further action taken by the PNG government, and the rates of violence remain unchanged. Although the Family Protection Bill was passed in 2013, it has yet to be implemented.

In 2014 an amendment to the PNG Criminal Code was introduced. The Criminal Code (Amendment) Act 2014 criminalised sorcery-related killings and violence. The aim of this Act was to protect women accused of sorcery.

PNG previously prepared the Equality and Participation Bill. This Bill aimed to increase the representation of women in Parliament by having 22 seats reserved for women. However, this Bill failed to pass in 2012 and is yet to be reconsidered.

== See also ==
- Human rights in Papua New Guinea
