= Xenia Peni =

Papua New Guinean swimmer

Personal information
- Full name: Xenia Peni
- National team: Papua New Guinea
- Born: 28 February 1983 (age 43) Port Moresby, Papua New Guinea
- Height: 1.60 m (5 ft 3 in)

Sport
- Sport: Swimming
- Strokes: Breaststroke

Xenia Peni (born February 28, 1983) is a Papua New Guinean former swimmer, who specialized in breaststroke events. Peni represented Papua New Guinea, as a 17-year-old, at the 2000 Summer Olympics, where she became the nation's first female flag bearer in the opening ceremony.

Peni competed only in the women's 100 m breaststroke at the 2000 Summer Olympics in Sydney. She received a ticket from FINA, under a Universality program, in an entry time of 1:18.58. She challenged seven other swimmers in heat two, including Bolivia's 26-year-old Katerine Moreno and Angola's Nádia Cruz, who competed in her fourth Olympic Games at age 25. She trailed behind Cruz in a spirited challenge by five-hundredths of a second (0.05) to round out the field in 1:19.62. Peni failed to advance into the semifinals, as she placed thirty-ninth overall in the prelims.

Olympic Games
| Preceded by Subul Babo | Flagbearer for Papua New Guinea; Sydney 2000 | Succeeded by Dika Toua |
