= Athletics at the 2008 Summer Paralympics – Men's 100 metres T46 =

The Men's 100m T46 had its first round held on September 14 at 17:05 and the Final on September 15 at 10:24.

== Medalists ==
Gold	Heath Francis; Australia
Silver	Francis Kompaon; Papua New Guinea
Bronze	Yohansson Nascimento; Brazil

== Results ==
Place	Athlete	Class	Round 1	Final
1	Heath Francis (AUS)	T46	11.07 Q	11.05
2	Francis Kompaon (PNG)	T46	11.10 Q	11.10
3	Yohansson Nascimento (BRA)	T46	11.18 Q	11.25
4	Xu Zhao (CHN)	T45	11.10 Q PR	11.26
5	Arnaud Assoumani (FRA)	T46	11.07 Q	11.34
6	Saeed Alkhaldi (KSA)	T46	11.25 q	11.36
7	Godwin Joseph Mbakara (NGR)	T46	11.24 q	11.37
8	Ettiam Calderon (CUB)	T46	11.21 Q	11.57
9	Serge Ornem (NGR)	T46	11.31	
10	Jianfeng Qiu (CHN)	T46	11.32	
11	Domingos Sebastiao (ANG)	T46	11.34	
12	Tomoki Tagawa (JPN)	T46	11.39	
13	Rubeng Gomez (VEN)	T46	11.42	
14	Willy Martinez (VEN)	T46	11.61	
15	Lucas Schoenfeld (ARG)	T46	11.68	
16	David Roos (RSA)	T46	11.73	
17	Markanda Reddy (IND)	T46	11.92	
18	Elliot Mujaji (ZIM)	T46	12.01	
	Bashiru Yunusa (NGR)	T46	DNS	
	Ayuba Cheledi Abdullahi (NGR)	T46	DSQ	
