= Papua New Guinea honours system =

Orders, decorations, and medals of Papua New Guinea

The Papua New Guinean honours system is the main system of honouring citizens of Papua New Guinea for their services to the country; it consists of three Orders and several medals. After independence, Papua New Guinea used the Imperial honours system, however, in recognition of the nation's 30th anniversary, a new awards system was adopted. The official announcement of its creation was made by Prime Minister Sir Michael Somare on 12 November 2004 and the first investitures were performed by the Princess Royal in early October 2005. The Imperial honours system is still in use as well, however, and the King issues a Papua New Guinean List as part of every Birthday and New Year Honours List.

== Order of Valour ==
Ribbon bar of the Cross of Valour

This Order consists of one level, the Cross of Valour (CV) awarded for only the most selfless acts of bravery in times of extreme personal danger. This bears resemblance to its counterparts in the Canadian and Australian honours systems. Prior to this award, citizens of Papua New Guinea would have received the George Cross for their actions.

Since Papua New Guinea still recognises the British honours system it is possible that citizens will still receive the GC, however this is considered unlikely as the Cross of Valour performs the same function. For acts of valour in the face of the enemy during wartime, citizens of PNG are still entitled to the Victoria Cross.

In ranking order, the Cross of Valour precedes Grand Companion of the Logohu.

== Order of Logohu ==
The Order of Logohu is the principal order of the Order of Papua New Guinea. Logohu is a Motuan word for the bird-of-paradise, the official national symbol of Papua New Guinea since its independence. The Order consists of three classes and a medal.

=== Grand Companion of the Order of Logohu ===
Ribbon for the Grand Companion of the Order of Logohu

The highest class, Grand Companion of the Order of Logohu may be awarded to citizens of Papua New Guinea and others for service, achievement, and merit in the highest degree, sustained over a period of twenty years. The class may be awarded to no more than 50 living citizens. Recipients are titled as Chief except for the Chancellor of the Order who is titled Grand Chief. One additional living Papua New Guinean may also be titled Grand Chief.

=== Officer of Logohu ===
Ribbon for all other ranks of the Order of Logohu and the National Logohu Medal

Officer of Logohu (OL) is awarded for distinguished service to Papua New Guinea, or to a local community, sustained over a period of at least ten years.

=== Member of Logohu ===
Member of Logohu (ML) is awarded for commendable service to a particular area of endeavour, to Papua New Guinea, or to a local community, sustained over a period of at least seven years.

=== National Logohu Medal ===
The National Logohu Medal (LM) is awarded for exemplary service in a profession, career, or industry group, or to the general community, over a period of at least five years.

== Order of the Star of Melanesia ==
Ribbon of the Order of the Star of Melanesia

This Order also consists of one level, the Companion of the Star of Melanesia (CSM). It is awarded for distinguished service of a high degree to Papua New Guinea and Melanesia, sustained over a period of fifteen years.

In ranking order, Companion of the Star of Melanesia follows Grand Companion of the Logohu.

People who have been awarded the honour include:

- Sir Brian Bell CSM KBE CStJ
- Queen Camilla LG LT ONZ GCVO GBE CSM CD PC
- Sean Dorney AO MBE CSM
- Vice Admiral Sir Timothy Laurence GCVO CB CSM ADC
- George Manuhu – Judge of the Supreme Court of Papua New Guinea
- Sir Rabbie Namaliu GCL CSM KCMG
- Laisenia Qarase – Prime Minister of Fiji
- Nahau Rooney – member of the first National Parliament of Papua New Guinea

== Order of precedence ==
The honours and awards listed below are listed in order of precedence with postnominals:

- Cross of Valour (CV)
- Grand Companion of Logohu (GCL)
- Companion of the Star of Melanesia (CSM)
- Officer of Logohu (OL)
- Member of Logohu (ML)
- National Logohu Medal (LM)
- Cross of Medical Service Medal (CMS)
- Distinguished Military Service Medal (DMS)
- Distinguished Police Service Medal (DPS)
- Distinguished Correctional Service Medal (DCS)
- Meritorious Emergency Service Medal (MES)
- Meritorious Public Service Medal (MPS)
- Meritorious Community Service Medal (MCS)
- Commendation for Valuable Service Medal (CVS)

== See also ==
- List of post-nominal letters
