= Francis Kompaon =

T46 Papua New Guinean track and field athlete

Medal record

Men's para athletics (T46)

Representing Papua New Guinea

Paralympic Games
Silver medal – second place	2008 Beijing	100 m T46

Pacific Games
Silver medal – second place	2015 Port Moresby	100 m Ambulent

Francis Kompaon (born 16 January 1986 in Rabaul) is a T46 Papua New Guinean athlete.

He represented Papua New Guinea at the 2008 Summer Paralympics in Beijing, competing in athletics in the one hundred metre sprint, T46 category. With a time of 11.10 seconds, he finished second in the final, five hundredths of a second behind Australia's Heath Francis. It was Papua New Guinea's first ever Olympic or Paralympic medal, and only the second ever Olympic or Paralympic medal won by a Pacific Islander; Tongan boxer Paea Wolfgramm had won a silver at the 1996 Olympics. He also competed in the 200-metre sprint, finishing ninth overall in the heats, with a time of 23.30 seconds. Kompaon was his country's flagbearer at the Games' opening ceremony, and was one of fifteen competitors (out of over 4000) selected to carry the torch during the Paralympic torch relay in Beijing.

He had previously won several gold medals at regional competitions in Oceania, and had finished fourth in the 200m sprint for élite athletes with disabilities at the 2006 Commonwealth Games.

Papua New Guinea's sports minister Dame Carol Kidu said that Kompaon's Paralympic medal had "raised the issue of disability in Papua New Guinea to a level that it has never been". In direct response to Kompaon's medal, Prime Minister Michael Somare promised that the government would increase funding for disability sports.

In 2009, Kompaon enrolled in sports management at Griffith University in Queensland.

He qualified as one of two athletes to represent Papua New Guinea at the 2012 Summer Paralympics in London, and was again selected to be his country's flag-bearer during the Games' opening ceremony competed in the men's 100m and 200m T46 (the category for upper limb amputees). In the 200m, he finished sixth (of eight) in his heat, with a new personal best of 23.05, and did not advance to the final. In his main event, the 100m, he finished third (of seven) in heat 2, qualifying for the final as the fastest loser overall with a personal best time of 11.21 (fifth fastest overall over the three heats). In the final, however, he was unable to repeat his Beijing performance; he "injured his hamstring near the finish line" and finished seventh (of eight) in 12.28.
