= Adlan Abdurashidov =

Russian boxer

Personal information
- Nationality: Russian
- Born: Adlan Aliyevich Abdurashidov; 31 July 1990 (age 36) Moscow, Russian Federation
- Height: 5 ft 7½ in (172 cm)
- Weight: Super lightweight

Boxing career
- Stance: Orthodox

Boxing record
- Total fights: 5
- Wins: 5
- Win by KO: 3
Medal record
Men's amateur boxing
Representing Russia
Summer Universiade
Gold medal – first place	2013 Kazan	Super lightweight

Adlan Aliyevich Abdurashidov (Russian: Адлан Алиевич Абдурашидов; born 31 July 1990) is a Russian boxer. Born in Moscow, he competed in the men's lightweight event at the 2016 Summer Olympics.

== Amateur career ==
Adlan started boxing in 2003. He became second on the Russian national amateur boxing championships both in 2012 and 2014 and won in 2017. As a super lightweight he won on 2013 Summer Universiade in Kazan. Abdurashidov represented Russia on 2016 Summer Olympics where he competed in the men's lightweight. He outscored his opponent Thadius Katua, but lost to Reda Benbaziz.

As an amateur he holds a record of 56–19–1.

== Professional career ==
5 fights	5 wins	0 losses
By knockout	3	0
By decision	2	0

No.	Result	Record	Opponent	Type	Round, time	Date	Location	Notes
5	Win	5–0	(Tanzania) Idd Pialari	UD	10 (10)	31 Oct 2020	Red Arena, Krasnaya Polyana, Russia	Won vacant WBO Oriental super light title
4	Win	4–0	(Colombia) Jose Luis Prieto	KO	1 (8), 1:03	21 Feb 2020	Dynamo Palace, Moscow	
3	Win	3–0	(Namibia) Moses Paulus	UD	10 (10)	19 Sep 2019	Uvais Akhtaev Sports Palace, Grozny	
2	Win	2–0	(Tanzania) Max Moshi	TKO	1 (6), 0:57	18 Apr 2019	Colosseum Sport Hall, Grozny	
1	Win	1–0	(Georgia (country)) Ruben Movsesiani	TKO	1 (6), 2:50	27 Oct 2018	Triumph, Lyubertsy	

== Awards ==
- Certificate of Honour of the President of the Russian Federation (19 July 2013).
- Medal “For Merit to the Chechen Republic” (2016).
