= Joyleen Jeffrey =

Papua New Guinean Paralympic sprinter

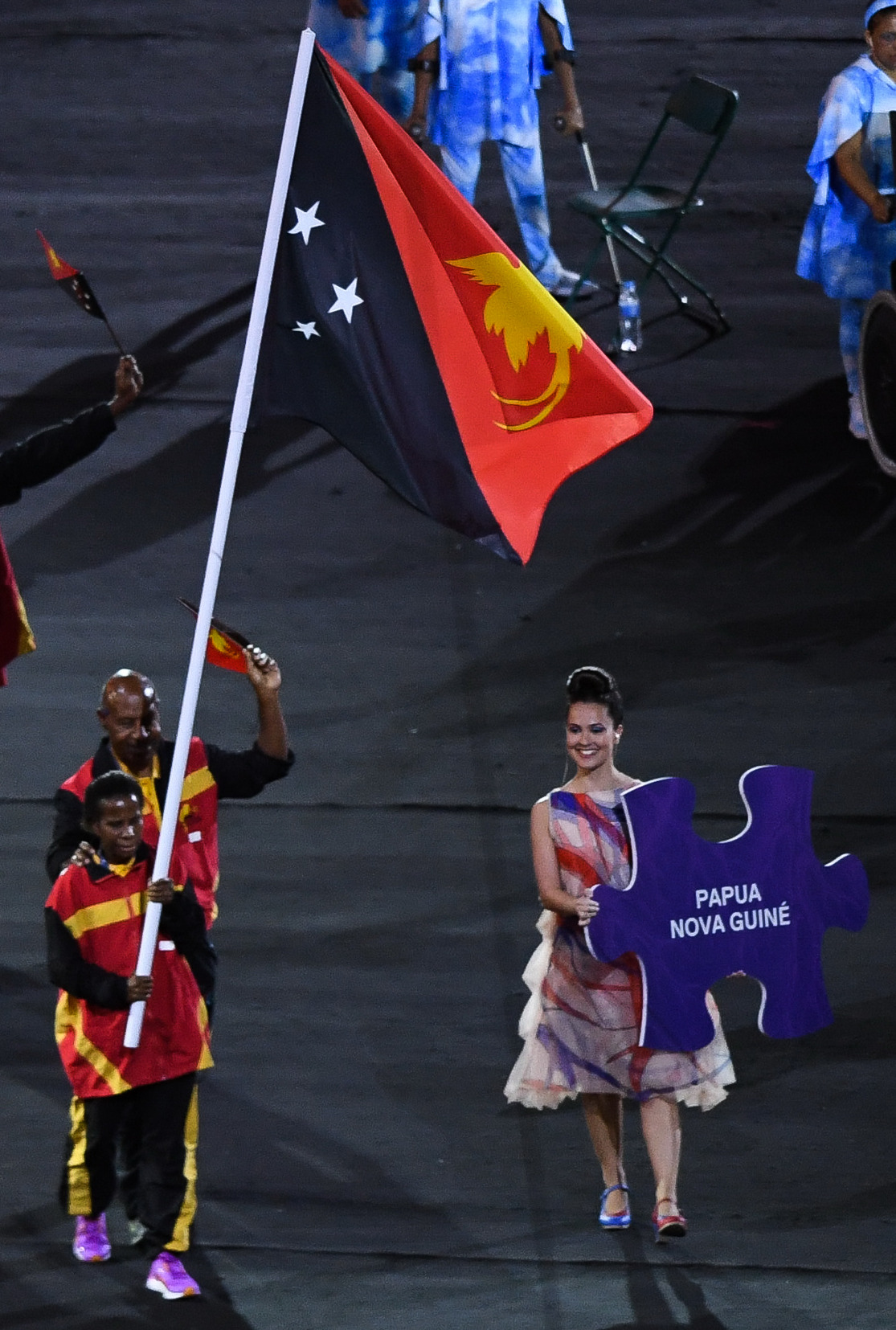
- Jeffrey with the Papua New Guinea flag at the 2016 Summer Paralympics Parade of Nations

Personal information
- Born: 29 October 1989 (age 36) Port Moresby, Papua New Guinea

Sport
- Sport: Paralympic athletics
- Disability class: T12
- Event: Sprint
- Club: Wewak Provincial Sports Club
- Coached by: Peter Agula

Joyleen Jeffrey (born 29 October 1989) is a Paralympic sprinter from Papua New Guinea.

She represented Papua New Guinea at the 2008 Summer Paralympics, competing in the 100 metre sprint, T12 category (for visually impaired athletes). She was disqualified for stepping out of her lane.

Jeffrey had previously won two silver medals at the Oceania Paralympic Championships in 2007, in the 100 m and 200 m events, as well as a gold medal (200 m) and a silver (100 m) at the Pacific Regional Games for the Disabled that same year.

In May 2011, she won gold in the T12 100 metre event at the Arafura Games, setting a new personal best of 14.27.
