= Wavala Kali =

Papua New Guinean sprinter

Personal information
- Nationality: Papua New Guinean
- Born: 26 June 1954 (age 72)

Sport
- Sport: Sprinting
- Event: 200 metres

Wavala Kali (born 26 June 1954) is a Papua New Guinean sprinter. He competed in the men's 200 metres and the men's 400 m at the 1976 Summer Olympics in Montreal.

Kali started running in 1971 at Iarowari High School. He is from Kelekapana, Abau District and Alukuni, Rigo District. He won a gold medal at the 1975 South Pacific Games. He was Papua New Guinea's first ever flag bearer at the Olympic Games.
