= Thadius Katua =

Papua New Guinean boxer

Personal information
- Nationality: Papua New Guinean
- Born: 4 November 1997 (age 28) Carteret Islands, Bougainville, Papua New Guinea
- Height: 1.67 m (5 ft 6 in)
- Weight: Lightweight

Boxing career

Boxing record
- Total fights: 1
- Wins: 0
- Losses: 1
- Draws: 0
Medal record
Men's Boxing
Representing Papua New Guinea
Pacific Games
Gold medal – first place	2015 Port Moresby	Lightweight

Thadius Katua (born November 4, 1997) is a boxer who represented Papua New Guinea at the 2016 Summer Olympics in Rio de Janeiro. He won a gold medal at the 2015 Pacific Games.

Competing at the age of 18, Katua was the youngest boxer in the 2016 Olympic tournament. Despite being outscored by opponent Adlan Abdurashidov in all three rounds, Katua's coach believed that he may have actually won the fight if the points had been tallied differently. When the judges ruled in favor of Abdurashidov many in the crowd voiced their support for Katua. Before taking part in the Olympics Katua had become the first Papua New Guinean to win a gold medal at the Commonwealth Youth Games in 2015.

Katua made his professional debut on 4 Apr 2023 against Mikaele Ravalace, where he lost via TKO in the 5th round.
