= Tau John Tokwepota =

Papua New Guinean long-distance runner

Tau John Tokwepota OLY
Personal information
- Nationality: Papua New Guinean
- Born: 25 June 1956 (age 70)

Sport
- Sport: Long-distance running
- Event: Marathon

Tau John Tokwepota (born 25 June 1956) is a Papua New Guinean long-distance runner. He competed in the marathon at the 1976 Summer Olympics and the 1984 Summer Olympics.
