= Graham Numa =

Papuan sailor

Personal information
- Nationality: Papua New Guinea
- Born: 19 August 1954 (age 71); Hula, Rigo District, Papua New Guinea

Sport
- Sport: Windsurfing

Graham Numa (born 19 August 1954) is a Papuan windsurfer and president of the Papua New Guinea Sailing Association. He competed in the 1988 Summer Olympics and the 1992 Summer Olympics.
