= Iammogapi Launa =

Papua New Guinean heptathlete

Dame Iammogapi Launa DBE BEM OLY
Personal information
- Nationality: Papua New Guinean
- Born: 16 September 1958 (age 67) Hula, Papua New Guinea

Sport
- Sport: Athletics
- Event: Heptathlon

Dame Iammogapi Launa DBE BEM OLY (born 16 September 1958), sometimes known as Iamo Launa, Iammo Launa, or Iammo Gapi Launa, is a Papua New Guinean athlete. She competed in the women's heptathlon at the 1984 Summer Olympics and the 1988 Summer Olympics.

The first woman to represent Papua New Guinea at the Olympics, Launa received a damehood in the 2026 New Year Honours for her service to sports.

In 2026, she was appointed by the Papua New Guinea Olympic Committee (PNGOC) as the Chef de Mission for Team PNG to the Dakar 2026 Youth Olympic Games in Senegal.
