= Dika Toua =

Papua New Guinean weightlifter (born 1984)

Dika Toua OLY
Personal information
- Full name: Loa Dika Toua
- Born: 23 June 1984 (age 42) Port Moresby, Papua New Guinea
- Height: 1.50 m (4 ft 11 in)
- Weight: 48–53 kg (106–117 lb)

Sport
- Country: Papua New Guinea
- Sport: Weightlifting
- Event: Women's 53 kg
- Coached by: Paul Coffa

Achievements and titles
- Olympic finals: 5
- World finals: 4
Medal record
Women's weightlifting
Representing Papua New Guinea
Commonwealth Games
Gold medal – first place	2014 Glasgow	53 kg
Silver medal – second place	2006 Melbourne	53 kg
Silver medal – second place	2018 Gold Coast	53 kg
Pacific Games
Gold medal – first place	2007 Apia	53 kg
Gold medal – first place	2011 Nouméa	53 kg
Gold medal – first place	2019 Apia	49 kg
Gold medal – first place	2023 Honiara	49 kg
Commonwealth Championships
Gold medal – first place	2012 Apia	53 kg
Silver medal – second place	2015 Pune	53 kg
Silver medal – second place	2019 Apia	49 kg
Bronze medal – third place	2017 Gold Coast	53 kg
Pacific Mini Games
Gold medal – first place	2017 Port Vila	53 kg
Gold medal – first place	2021 Saipan	49 kg
Oceania Championships
Gold medal – first place	2002 Suva	53 kg
Gold medal – first place	2003 Nuku'alofa	53 kg
Gold medal – first place	2004 Suva	53 kg
Gold medal – first place	2005 Melbourne	53 kg
Gold medal – first place	2007 Apia	53 kg
Gold medal – first place	2008 Auckland	53 kg
Gold medal – first place	2012 Apia	53 kg
Gold medal – first place	2013 Brisbane	53 kg
Gold medal – first place	2014 Le Mont-Dore	53 kg
Gold medal – first place	2017 Gold Coast	53 kg
Gold medal – first place	2018 Le Mont-Dore	53 kg
Gold medal – first place	2019 Apia	49 kg
Gold medal – first place	2022 Saipan	49 kg
Gold medal – first place	2023 Honiara	49 kg
Gold medal – first place	2024 Auckland	49 kg
Gold medal – first place	2025 Meyuns	53 kg
Silver medal – second place	2026 Apia	53 kg

Loa Dika Toua (born 23 June 1984) is a Papua New Guinean Olympian weightlifter. She competed at the 2020 Summer Olympics, in the women's 49 kg class.

She currently competes in the 49 kg weight class. She is a 15 time, and current, Oceania champion and a former Commonwealth champion. She is also the current Pacific Games champion.

== Career ==
=== Olympic games ===
At just 16 years of age, she was the inaugural woman to lift weight at an Olympic event, competing in the 48 kg category at the Sydney 2000 Summer Olympics. Toua finished in tenth place with a total lift of 117.5 kg.

She was the national flag bearer at the Athens 2004 Summer Olympics opening ceremony. This time competing in the women's 53 kg weight class, she lifted a total of 177.5 kg to place sixth.

Toua qualified for Papua New Guinea in the women's 53 kg event at the 2008 Summer Olympics in Beijing. There she ranked 7th with a total lift of 184 kg which was her highest personal lift overall at any Olympics she has attended to date.

She again, for the fourth consecutive time, represented Papua New Guinea at the London 2012 Summer Olympics. Lifting a total of 174 kg, the veteran weightlifter finished in 12th after Zulfiya Chinshanlo of Kazakhstan and Cristina Iovu of Moldova were disqualified.

She represented Papua New Guinea, for the fifth time at the 2020 Summer Olympics, where she placed 10th.

=== Commonwealth games ===
In 2002 she attended the Manchester Commonwealth Games at the 48 kg weight category, lifting 75 kg in the clean and jerk which would have placed her 4th, official records show no weight in the snatch.

In 2006, she won the silver medal in the 53 kg weight class at the 2006 Commonwealth Games. It was her first major achievement at an international competition.

Competing in the same category at the 2014 Commonwealth Games, she won the silver medal, with a lift of 193 kg, just 3 kilos short of the gold and new games record. Days later, the original gold medalist, 16-year-old Chika Amalaha of Nigeria failed a doping test and was stripped of her medal and placement. With the medals redistributed, Toua was now the gold medalist and her lift of 193 kg became the new games record.

In 2018, competing in her third games in the Gold Coast she placed second once again for her second Commonwealth games silver and third medal overall. She was 10 kilos behind the gold medalist after failing her last two lifts. A month after the games ended the International Weightlifting Federation, in June, announced that the original winner, Khumukcham Sanjita Chanu of India, tested positive for testosterone from her A sample after the 2017 World Championships. The IWF had stated that if the Indian weightlifters B sample also returns positive. In January 2019 the IWF has revoked the provisional suspension of Chanu and let to keep her gold medal.

She finished in 5th place in the women's 49 kg event at the 2022 Commonwealth Games held in Birmingham, England.

== Major results ==
Year	Venue	Weight	Snatch (kg)				Clean & Jerk (kg)				Total	Rank
Year	Venue	Weight	1	2	3	Rank	1	2	3	Rank	Total	Rank
Olympic Games
2000	Sydney, Australia	48 kg	~~45~~	45	50	10	62.5	67.5	~~72.5~~	10	117.5	10
2004	Athens, Greece	53 kg	70	75	~~80~~	7	92.5	97.5	102.5	6	177.5	6
2008	Beijing, China	53 kg	~~77~~	77	80	7	104	~~108~~	~~108~~	6	184	7
2012	(United Kingdom) London, Great Britain	53 kg	75	~~79~~	79	12	95	~~100~~	~~100~~	12	174	12
2021	Tokyo, Japan	49 kg	69	72	~~76~~	12	~~95~~	95	~~100~~	8	167	10
World Championships
2003	Vancouver, Canada	53 kg	65	70	~~72.5~~	21	87.5	92.5	~~95~~	21	162.5	21
2005	Doha, Qatar	53 kg	~~77~~	79	~~83~~	9	~~105~~	~~105~~	~~105~~	--	--	--
2007	Santo Domingo, Dominican Republic	53 kg	74	~~78~~	~~78~~	30	96	~~101~~	101	18	175	22
2015	Houston, United States	53 kg	76	~~80~~	80	22	103	~~106~~	~~109~~	20	183	20

== Personal life ==
Toua gave birth to her first child in 2007 to husband, Mavera Gavera. She now has two children, Paul and Ani-Geua. She owns her own weightlifting club in Port Moresby.

Olympic Games
Preceded by Xenia Peni	Flagbearer for Papua New Guinea; Athens 2004	Succeeded by Ryan Pini
