= Papua New Guinea Olympic Committee =

National Olympic Committee

- Country: Papua New Guinea
- Code: PNG
- Recognized: 1974
- Continental Association: ONOC
- Headquarters: Boroko, Port Moresby
- President: Emma Waiwai
- Secretary General: Desmond Kaviagu
- Website: pngolympic.org

The Papua New Guinea Olympic Committee (IOC code: PNG) is the National Olympic Committee representing Papua New Guinea.

== History ==
Florence Bundu was the chairperson of the Olympic Committee until her death in 2009.

== See also ==
- Papua New Guinea at the Olympics
- Papua New Guinea at the Commonwealth Games
