= 2007 World Weightlifting Championships – Men's 69 kg =

The men's competition in 69 kg division was staged on September 18–19, 2007.

== Schedule ==
Date	Time	Event
18 September 2007	19:00	Group E
18 September 2007	21:00	Group D
19 September 2007	09:30	Group C
19 September 2007	12:00	Group B
19 September 2007	17:00	Group A

== Medalists ==
Event	Gold		Silver		Bronze	
Snatch	Shi Zhiyong (CHN)	158 kg	Zhang Guozheng (CHN)	155 kg	Mete Binay (TUR)	154 kg
Clean & Jerk	Zhang Guozheng (CHN)	192 kg	Vencelas Dabaya (FRA)	187 kg	Kim Chol-jin (PRK)	185 kg
Total	Zhang Guozheng (CHN)	347 kg	Shi Zhiyong (CHN)	338 kg	Demir Demirev (BUL)	334 kg

== Records ==
Prior to this competition, the existing world records were as follows.

World Record	Snatch	Georgi Markov (BUL)	165 kg	Sydney, Australia	20 September 2000
World Record	Clean & Jerk	Zhang Guozheng (CHN)	197 kg	Qinhuangdao, China	11 September 2003
World Record	Total	Galabin Boevski (BUL)	357 kg	Athens, Greece	24 November 1999

== Results ==
Rank	Athlete	Group	Body weight	Snatch (kg)				Clean & Jerk (kg)				Total
Rank	Athlete	Group	Body weight	1	2	3	Rank	1	2	3	Rank	Total
1st place, gold medalist(s)	Zhang Guozheng (CHN)	A	68.99	150	155	~~157~~	2nd place, silver medalist(s)	184	189	192	1st place, gold medalist(s)	347
2nd place, silver medalist(s)	Shi Zhiyong (CHN)	A	68.06	153	~~158~~	158	1st place, gold medalist(s)	180	~~185~~	~~185~~	5	338
3rd place, bronze medalist(s)	Demir Demirev (BUL)	A	68.74	150	~~153~~	153	4	181	~~184~~	~~184~~	4	334
4	Vencelas Dabaya (FRA)	A	68.61	143	~~146~~	~~146~~	8	~~182~~	182	187	2nd place, silver medalist(s)	330
5	Kim Chol-jin (PRK)	A	68.87	~~145~~	145	~~150~~	6	185	~~189~~	~~189~~	3rd place, bronze medalist(s)	330
6	Turan Mirzayev (AZE)	A	68.94	~~145~~	145	~~148~~	7	177	179	~~186~~	6	324
7	Mehmed Fikretov (BUL)	A	68.56	139	142	~~144~~	9	175	~~182~~	~~183~~	7	317
8	Alexandru Dudoglo (MDA)	B	68.93	~~142~~	142	~~150~~	12	165	170	174	8	316
9	Yordanis Borrero (CUB)	B	68.78	138	142	~~145~~	11	168	173	~~177~~	11	315
10	Edwin Mosquera (COL)	B	68.86	~~137~~	137	141	13	167	~~171~~	171	15	312
11	Afgan Bayramov (AZE)	B	68.25	133	~~136~~	136	18	173	~~177~~	~~177~~	9	309
12	Giorgio De Luca (ITA)	B	68.71	138	~~142~~	~~142~~	15	168	~~171~~	171	12	309
13	Alexandru Roșu (ROU)	B	68.82	133	137	~~140~~	17	164	169	171	13	308
14	Yasin Arslan (TUR)	B	68.63	135	140	142	10	160	165	~~168~~	19	307
15	Yoshito Shintani (JPN)	B	68.61	128	~~132~~	132	24	167	169	173	10	305
16	Maiker Rojas (VEN)	C	68.88	135	140	~~141~~	14	160	165	~~167~~	20	305
17	Raúl Sánchez (VEN)	C	68.40	~~130~~	130	135	20	160	165	~~167~~	17	300
18	Oleksiy Skvorodnyev (UKR)	B	68.58	~~133~~	~~133~~	135	21	~~165~~	~~165~~	165	18	300
19	Sukhrob Raupov (UZB)	B	67.87	~~135~~	~~135~~	137	16	160	~~164~~	—	29	297
20	Sitthisak Suphalak (THA)	B	68.34	~~132~~	135	~~138~~	19	162	~~166~~	~~166~~	25	297
21	Kim Yoon-han (KOR)	C	68.82	125	~~129~~	~~129~~	43	162	~~171~~	171	14	296
22	Tarek Yehia (EGY)	C	68.81	131	~~135~~	~~135~~	25	157	160	164	22	295
23	Samuel Suywens (FRA)	C	68.82	131	~~135~~	135	22	~~160~~	160	~~163~~	32	295
24	Jong Kang-chol (PRK)	C	68.86	135	~~140~~	~~140~~	23	155	160	~~165~~	34	295
25	Mohd Hidayat Hamidon (MAS)	D	68.96	125	130	~~132~~	37	160	165	~~168~~	21	295
26	Dimitrios Kirillidis (GRE)	B	68.86	130	~~135~~	~~136~~	35	162	~~171~~	~~171~~	26	292
27	Wu Tsung-ling (TPE)	C	68.89	127	131	~~133~~	26	157	161	~~165~~	28	292
28	Ronnayuth Amnoiwong (THA)	C	68.24	~~127~~	127	~~130~~	39	160	~~163~~	163	23	290
29	Chiu Yi-lieh (TPE)	E	68.69	120	126	130	31	152	160	~~165~~	30	290
30	Budi Setiawan (INA)	C	68.70	130	~~135~~	~~135~~	32	~~160~~	160	~~165~~	31	290
31	Artyom Shaloyan (GER)	C	68.83	126	~~130~~	130	34	155	160	~~162~~	33	290
32	Sanjar Kadyrbergenow (TKM)	C	68.88	130	~~135~~	~~135~~	36	150	155	160	35	290
33	Francis Luna-Grenier (CAN)	D	68.86	~~122~~	122	127	41	155	~~162~~	162	27	289
34	Aliyu Isiaka (NGR)	D	68.85	120	125	~~130~~	46	155	160	163	24	288
35	Swara Mohammed (IRQ)	C	68.18	~~130~~	130	~~136~~	27	155	~~161~~	~~162~~	39	285
36	Antonio Tarifa (ESP)	D	68.23	120	125	130	28	145	150	155	41	285
37	Tomohiro Asada (JPN)	D	68.60	122	127	130	29	155	~~161~~	~~161~~	42	285
38	Kutman Moldodosov (KGZ)	E	68.75	~~125~~	125	130	33	150	155	~~160~~	43	285
39	Govindan Elumalai (IND)	E	68.94	125	~~130~~	~~130~~	47	~~150~~	150	160	36	285
40	Miroslav Janíček (SVK)	C	68.83	~~127~~	127	~~130~~	40	~~155~~	~~155~~	155	44	282
41	André Winter (GER)	D	68.30	124	128	~~130~~	38	152	~~157~~	~~157~~	47	280
42	Mihails Semjonovs (LAT)	D	67.63	120	~~124~~	124	48	150	~~155~~	155	38	279
43	George Borcilă (ROU)	D	68.48	120	~~125~~	125	42	145	150	154	46	279
44	Henry Brower (USA)	D	68.87	122	~~125~~	~~125~~	49	152	~~157~~	157	37	279
45	Radim Kozel (CZE)	D	68.60	125	~~130~~	130	30	~~146~~	146	~~151~~	53	276
46	François Etoundi (CMR)	D	68.83	125	~~131~~	~~132~~	44	151	—	—	49	276
47	Isaac Morillas (ESP)	D	68.19	116	120	~~125~~	51	150	155	~~160~~	40	275
48	Subhon Kobilov (UZB)	D	68.84	120	~~125~~	125	45	~~150~~	150	~~154~~	50	275
49	Nguyễn Hồng Ngọc (VIE)	E	68.78	115	120	~~125~~	52	140	148	152	48	272
50	Gergely Csánk (HUN)	D	68.84	116	120	~~123~~	53	148	~~153~~	~~153~~	51	268
51	Phil Johnson (USA)	D	65.82	~~120~~	120	~~123~~	50	~~145~~	~~145~~	145	54	265
52	Greg Shushu (RSA)	E	66.44	110	~~115~~	~~115~~	54	140	145	147	52	257
53	Furas Wegdan (YEM)	E	68.66	~~110~~	~~110~~	110	55	140	~~144~~	~~144~~	56	250
54	Logona Esau (TUV)	E	68.82	100	~~105~~	~~105~~	57	135	140	144	55	244
55	Constantine Vasiliades (CYP)	E	68.72	100	105	108	56	130	135	~~137~~	57	243
—	Mete Binay (TUR)	A	68.48	~~151~~	151	154	3rd place, bronze medalist(s)	~~170~~	~~170~~	~~171~~	—	—
—	Vladislav Lukanin (RUS)	A	68.77	147	~~152~~	—	5	—	—	—	—	—
—	Youssef Sbai (TUN)	B	68.43	~~138~~	~~138~~	~~138~~	—	—	—	—	—	—
—	Lee Bae-young (KOR)	A	68.73	~~150~~	~~150~~	~~150~~	—	~~186~~	~~186~~	~~189~~	—	—
—	Tigran Martirosyan (ARM)	A	68.89	~~151~~	~~151~~	~~151~~	—	171	—	—	16	—
—	Faerul Talib (MAS)	C	68.94	~~130~~	~~130~~	~~131~~	—	155	~~161~~	~~161~~	45	—
DQ	Mukhit Ussenbayev (KAZ)	C	68.83	131	~~140~~	140	—	~~157~~	157	161	—	—
