= 2003 World Weightlifting Championships – Men's 69 kg =

The 2003 World Weightlifting Championships were held in Vancouver, Canada from 14 November to 22 November. The men's 69 kilograms division was staged on 15 and 16 November 2003.

== Schedule ==
Date	Time	Event
15 November 2003	11:00	Group D
15 November 2003	16:00	Group C
16 November 2003	10:00	Group B
16 November 2003	12:30	Group A

== Medalists ==
Event	Gold		Silver		Bronze	
Snatch	Zhang Guozheng (CHN)	152.5 kg	Arkadiusz Smółka (POL)	152.5 kg	Lee Bae-young (KOR)	150.0 kg
Clean & Jerk	Zhang Guozheng (CHN)	192.5 kg	Lee Bae-young (KOR)	190.0 kg	Afgan Bayramov (AZE)	180.0 kg
Total	Zhang Guozheng (CHN)	345.0 kg	Lee Bae-young (KOR)	340.0 kg	Turan Mirzayev (AZE)	327.5 kg

== Records ==
Prior to this competition, the existing world records were as follows.

World Record	Snatch	Georgi Markov (BUL)	165.0 kg	Sydney, Australia	20 September 2000
World Record	Clean & Jerk	Zhang Guozheng (CHN)	197.5 kg	Qinhuangdao, China	11 September 2003
World Record	Total	Galabin Boevski (BUL)	357.5 kg	Athens, Greece	24 November 1999

== Results ==
Rank	Athlete	Group	Body weight	Snatch (kg)				Clean & Jerk (kg)				Total
Rank	Athlete	Group	Body weight	1	2	3	Rank	1	2	3	Rank	Total
1st place, gold medalist(s)	Zhang Guozheng (CHN)	A	68.76	~~152.5~~	~~152.5~~	152.5	1st place, gold medalist(s)	187.5	192.5	~~195.0~~	1st place, gold medalist(s)	345.0
2nd place, silver medalist(s)	Lee Bae-young (KOR)	A	68.67	145.0	150.0	~~152.5~~	3rd place, bronze medalist(s)	~~185.0~~	185.0	190.0	2nd place, silver medalist(s)	340.0
3rd place, bronze medalist(s)	Turan Mirzayev (AZE)	A	68.71	147.5	~~152.5~~	~~152.5~~	6	~~180.0~~	~~180.0~~	180.0	6	327.5
4	Ferit Şen (TUR)	A	68.76	~~145.0~~	145.0	~~150.0~~	9	175.0	~~180.0~~	180.0	7	325.0
5	Arkadiusz Smółka (POL)	A	68.77	147.5	~~152.5~~	152.5	2nd place, silver medalist(s)	172.5	~~177.5~~	~~177.5~~	15	325.0
6	Nikolaj Pešalov (CRO)	A	68.05	~~142.5~~	142.5	147.5	5	172.5	~~177.5~~	~~177.5~~	13	320.0
7	Erwin Abdullah (INA)	A	68.45	140.0	~~145.0~~	~~147.5~~	12	~~180.0~~	180.0	~~187.5~~	5	320.0
8	Zoltán Kecskés (HUN)	A	68.75	~~145.0~~	145.0	~~150.0~~	8	175.0	~~180.0~~	~~180.0~~	11	320.0
9	Siarhei Laurenau (BLR)	C	68.82	135.0	142.5	150.0	4	160.0	~~170.0~~	170.0	20	320.0
10	Mehdi Panzvan (IRI)	B	68.17	135.0	140.0	145.0	7	167.5	~~172.5~~	172.5	14	317.5
11	Lucian Maxinianu (ROM)	B	68.53	~~142.5~~	~~142.5~~	142.5	10	170.0	175.0	~~177.5~~	9	317.5
12	Afgan Bayramov (AZE)	B	67.91	~~135.0~~	135.0	~~140.0~~	19	170.0	175.0	180.0	3rd place, bronze medalist(s)	315.0
13	Vencelas Dabaya (CMR)	B	68.33	135.0	~~140.0~~	~~140.0~~	21	175.0	180.0	—	4	315.0
14	Mohamed El-Tantawy (EGY)	A	68.62	~~140.0~~	140.0	~~145.0~~	15	~~175.0~~	~~175.0~~	175.0	10	315.0
15	Miroslav Janíček (SVK)	B	68.90	~~137.5~~	~~137.5~~	137.5	18	~~172.5~~	172.5	~~177.5~~	16	310.0
16	Giuseppe Ficco (ITA)	B	68.98	~~135.0~~	135.0	~~140.0~~	23	175.0	~~180.0~~	~~180.0~~	12	310.0
17	Zoltán Farkas (HUN)	B	68.65	135.0	140.0	~~142.5~~	16	~~165.0~~	165.0	167.5	22	307.5
18	Artur Danielyan (ARM)	B	67.80	~~130.0~~	130.0	~~137.5~~	24	170.0	~~175.0~~	175.0	8	305.0
19	Yoshito Shintani (JPN)	C	68.30	~~135.0~~	135.0	~~137.5~~	20	170.0	~~175.0~~	~~175.0~~	17	305.0
20	Amílcar Pernía (VEN)	C	68.83	130.0	135.0	~~137.5~~	22	170.0	~~175.0~~	~~175.0~~	21	305.0
21	Romuald Ernault (FRA)	C	68.14	~~137.5~~	137.5	~~142.5~~	17	160.0	165.0	~~170.0~~	23	302.5
22	Jafar Al-Bagir (KSA)	C	68.38	~~130.0~~	~~130.0~~	130.0	25	165.0	~~170.0~~	170.0	18	300.0
23	Maurizio Bombaci (ITA)	C	68.42	125.0	130.0	~~132.5~~	26	165.0	~~170.0~~	170.0	19	300.0
24	Ali Hidaiel (IRQ)	C	68.76	130.0	~~135.0~~	~~135.0~~	27	155.0	162.5	~~167.5~~	26	292.5
25	Yukio Peter (NRU)	D	68.92	~~125.0~~	125.0	~~132.5~~	29	~~160.0~~	160.0	165.0	24	290.0
26	Manuel Martín (ESP)	D	68.23	120.0	~~125.0~~	~~125.0~~	30	157.5	160.0	162.5	25	282.5
27	Sébastien Groulx (CAN)	D	67.51	115.0	~~120.0~~	~~120.0~~	32	145.0	150.0	155.0	27	270.0
28	Marco Dumberry (CAN)	D	68.51	117.5	122.5	125.0	28	145.0	~~150.0~~	~~150.0~~	29	270.0
29	Ben Turner (AUS)	D	68.96	117.5	~~122.5~~	~~122.5~~	31	~~150.0~~	150.0	~~155.0~~	28	267.5
30	Wayne Healy (IRL)	D	66.99	95.0	100.0	105.0	33	122.5	130.0	135.0	30	240.0
—	Cho Hyo-won (KOR)	B	67.75	~~130.0~~	~~130.0~~	~~130.0~~	—	~~170.0~~	—	—	—	—
—	Sukhrob Raupov (UZB)	B	68.21	~~140.0~~	~~140.0~~	~~140.0~~	—	—	—	—	—	—
—	Abdulmohsen Al-Bagir (KSA)	A	68.23	140.0	~~145.0~~	~~145.0~~	11	~~175.0~~	~~175.0~~	~~175.0~~	—	—
—	Yoshihisa Miyaji (JPN)	B	68.56	~~140.0~~	140.0	~~142.5~~	13	~~165.0~~	~~165.0~~	~~167.5~~	—	—
—	Fadel Nasser Sarouf (QAT)	C	68.58	130.0	140.0	~~150.0~~	14	—	—	—	—	—
—	Alexandr Okhremenko (KAZ)	B	68.91	~~140.0~~	~~140.0~~	~~140.0~~	—	—	—	—	—	
DQ	Dmitriy Lomakin (KAZ)	C	67.92	~~135.0~~	~~135.0~~	135.0	—	~~160.0~~	~~160.0~~	160.0	—	—
DQ	Vladislav Lukanin (RUS)	A	68.59	142.5	147.5	~~150.0~~	—	182.5	187.5	192.5	—	—
