= 2006 World Weightlifting Championships – Men's 69 kg =

Weightlifting division

The 2006 World Weightlifting Championships were held in Santo Domingo, Dominican Republic from 30 September to 7 October. The men's 69 kilograms division was staged on 1 and 2 October 2006.

== Schedule ==
Date	Time	Event
1 October 2006	18:00	Group C
2 October 2006	10:00	Group B
2 October 2006	14:00	Group A

== Medalists ==
Event	Gold		Silver		Bronze	
Snatch	Shi Zhiyong (CHN)	150 kg	Mete Binay (TUR)	147 kg	Vencelas Dabaya (FRA)	146 kg
Clean & Jerk	Vencelas Dabaya (FRA)	186 kg	Armen Ghazaryan (ARM)	178 kg	Shi Zhiyong (CHN)	177 kg
Total	Vencelas Dabaya (FRA)	332 kg	Shi Zhiyong (CHN)	327 kg	Demir Demirev (BUL)	318 kg

== Records ==
Prior to this competition, the existing world records were as follows.

World Record	Snatch	Georgi Markov (BUL)	165 kg	Sydney, Australia	20 September 2000
World Record	Clean & Jerk	Zhang Guozheng (CHN)	197 kg	Qinhuangdao, China	11 September 2003
World Record	Total	Galabin Boevski (BUL)	357 kg	Athens, Greece	24 November 1999

== Results ==
Rank	Athlete	Group	Body weight	Snatch (kg)				Clean & Jerk (kg)				Total
Rank	Athlete	Group	Body weight	1	2	3	Rank	1	2	3	Rank	Total
1st place, gold medalist(s)	Vencelas Dabaya (FRA)	A	68.55	143	~~146~~	146	3rd place, bronze medalist(s)	178	182	186	1st place, gold medalist(s)	332
2nd place, silver medalist(s)	Shi Zhiyong (CHN)	A	67.20	145	~~150~~	150	1st place, gold medalist(s)	172	177	~~182~~	3rd place, bronze medalist(s)	327
3rd place, bronze medalist(s)	Demir Demirev (BUL)	A	68.90	~~143~~	143	~~147~~	4	172	175	~~186~~	4	318
4	Yordanis Borrero (CUB)	A	68.90	138	142	~~146~~	5	164	169	174	6	316
5	Giorgio De Luca (ITA)	A	68.95	137	141	~~145~~	6	170	175	~~176~~	5	316
6	Tigran Martirosyan (ARM)	A	68.90	~~140~~	140	~~143~~	8	161	166	~~172~~	10	306
7	Mehmed Fikretov (BUL)	A	68.70	130	135	~~138~~	10	170	~~175~~	~~179~~	9	305
8	Afgan Bayramov (AZE)	A	68.15	130	~~136~~	~~136~~	11	165	171	~~176~~	7	301
9	Kuanysh Rakhatov (KAZ)	A	67.90	135	140	~~145~~	7	160	~~162~~	—	14	300
10	Eduardo Hernán (VEN)	B	68.40	120	125	128	15	165	169	171	8	299
11	Wu Tsung-ling (TPE)	C	69.00	128	132	136	9	~~158~~	~~158~~	158	19	294
12	Ronnayuth Amnoiwong (THA)	B	68.45	126	~~128~~	128	16	151	~~161~~	163	12	291
13	Alexandru Roșu (ROM)	B	68.95	125	~~129~~	129	14	155	160	162	13	291
14	André Winter (GER)	B	68.60	125	130	~~132~~	13	155	160	~~164~~	15	290
15	Maurizio Bombaci (ITA)	B	68.65	120	125	~~128~~	22	160	165	~~167~~	11	290
16	Asif Mammadov (AZE)	B	68.55	126	~~130~~	130	12	159	~~164~~	~~164~~	16	289
17	Tomohiro Asada (JPN)	B	68.70	123	127	~~129~~	17	156	159	~~162~~	17	286
18	Welisson Silva (BRA)	B	68.80	125	~~130~~	~~130~~	23	153	~~157~~	157	20	282
19	Kambar Toktonaliev (KGZ)	C	68.50	~~121~~	121	125	20	150	153	~~155~~	21	278
20	Francis Luna-Grenier (CAN)	C	68.80	115	120	~~125~~	27	152	158	~~164~~	18	278
21	Gergely Csánk (HUN)	C	68.80	112	117	121	26	148	151	~~155~~	22	272
22	Jiří Žejdlík (SVK)	C	68.35	120	124	~~127~~	24	140	~~145~~	~~145~~	26	264
23	Kevin Stuart (GBR)	C	68.75	~~113~~	~~113~~	113	29	~~142~~	142	146	23	259
24	Sébastien Groulx (CAN)	C	68.45	108	~~112~~	112	30	140	145	~~148~~	24	257
25	Moreno Martínez (DOM)	C	67.50	115	~~120~~	~~120~~	28	140	~~145~~	~~145~~	25	255
—	Armen Ghazaryan (ARM)	A	68.90	~~145~~	~~145~~	~~145~~	—	170	178	~~183~~	2nd place, silver medalist(s)	—
—	Wilfredo Martínez (PUR)	C	68.90	~~127~~	127	~~133~~	18	—	—	—	—	—
—	Chen Po-pu (TPE)	C	68.70	~~124~~	~~124~~	124	25	~~152~~	~~152~~	~~152~~	—	—
—	Mete Binay (TUR)	A	67.80	147	~~151~~	~~151~~	2nd place, silver medalist(s)	~~170~~	~~170~~	~~171~~	—	—
—	Isaac Morillas (ESP)	B	68.55	120	~~125~~	125	21	~~150~~	~~150~~	~~150~~	—	—
—	Ricardo Flores (ECU)	B	69.00	126	~~128~~	~~128~~	19	—	—	—	—	—
—	Nikolaj Pešalov (CRO)	B	69.00	—	—	—	—	—	—	—	—	—
