= 2005 World Weightlifting Championships – Men's 69 kg =

The 2005 World Weightlifting Championships were held in Doha, Qatar from 9 November to 17 November. The men's 69 kilograms division was staged on 11 November 2005.

== Schedule ==
Date	Time	Event
11 November 2005	15:00	Group B
11 November 2005	20:00	Group A

== Medalists ==
Event	Gold		Silver		Bronze	
Snatch	Shi Zhiyong (CHN)	160 kg	Lee Bae-young (KOR)	152 kg	Vencelas Dabaya (FRA)	145 kg
Clean & Jerk	Shi Zhiyong (CHN)	190 kg	Lee Bae-young (KOR)	185 kg	Vencelas Dabaya (FRA)	179 kg
Total	Shi Zhiyong (CHN)	350 kg	Lee Bae-young (KOR)	337 kg	Vencelas Dabaya (FRA)	324 kg

== Records ==
Prior to this competition, the existing world records were as follows.

World Record	Snatch	Georgi Markov (BUL)	165 kg	Sydney, Australia	20 September 2000
World Record	Clean & Jerk	Zhang Guozheng (CHN)	197 kg	Qinhuangdao, China	11 September 2003
World Record	Total	Galabin Boevski (BUL)	357 kg	Athens, Greece	24 November 1999

== Results ==
Rank	Athlete	Group	Body weight	Snatch (kg)				Clean & Jerk (kg)				Total
Rank	Athlete	Group	Body weight	1	2	3	Rank	1	2	3	Rank	Total
1st place, gold medalist(s)	Shi Zhiyong (CHN)	A	67.98	152	157	160	1st place, gold medalist(s)	180	185	190	1st place, gold medalist(s)	350
2nd place, silver medalist(s)	Lee Bae-young (KOR)	A	68.62	~~147~~	147	152	2nd place, silver medalist(s)	185	~~190~~	~~191~~	2nd place, silver medalist(s)	337
3rd place, bronze medalist(s)	Vencelas Dabaya (FRA)	A	68.12	140	145	~~146~~	3rd place, bronze medalist(s)	179	~~185~~	~~186~~	3rd place, bronze medalist(s)	324
4	Armen Ghazaryan (ARM)	A	68.63	137	~~142~~	142	6	~~176~~	176	~~181~~	4	318
5	Demir Demirev (BUL)	A	68.52	142	~~146~~	~~146~~	5	175	~~178~~	~~178~~	6	317
6	Mehmed Fikretov (BUL)	A	68.09	130	135	~~138~~	9	170	~~175~~	175	5	310
7	Artur Danielyan (ARM)	A	68.74	132	~~137~~	137	8	172	~~180~~	~~180~~	7	309
8	José Casado (ESP)	A	68.48	135	140	142	4	165	~~171~~	~~171~~	10	307
9	Ninel Miculescu (ROM)	A	67.85	~~135~~	135	140	7	155	165	~~170~~	9	305
10	Sebastian Żukowski (POL)	B	68.74	123	~~127~~	127	11	162	164	167	8	294
11	Milton Campo (COL)	B	68.48	127	~~130~~	130	10	155	160	~~163~~	11	290
12	Evgeny Koshenetz (ISR)	B	68.95	122	~~127~~	~~127~~	14	150	154	~~158~~	12	276
13	Kutman Moldodosov (KGZ)	B	68.27	120	~~125~~	125	12	145	~~150~~	150	14	275
14	Mark Spooner (NZL)	B	68.71	116	~~120~~	120	15	147	152	~~158~~	13	272
15	Sanjar Kadyrbergenow (TKM)	B	68.70	~~120~~	122	~~128~~	13	145	~~150~~	~~150~~	15	267
16	Abdellatif Ataar (MAR)	B	67.87	95	99	101	16	~~125~~	125	130	17	231
17	Wayne Healy (IRL)	B	65.98	96	~~100~~	~~102~~	17	125	130	~~135~~	16	226
