= 2002 World Weightlifting Championships – Men's 69 kg =

The 2002 World Weightlifting Championships were held in Warsaw, Poland from 19 November to 26 November. The men's 69 kilograms division was staged on 21 November 2002.

== Schedule ==
Date	Time	Event
21 November 2002	10:00	Group C
21 November 2002	14:00	Group B
21 November 2002	17:00	Group A

== Medalists ==
Event	Gold		Silver		Bronze	
Snatch	Chen Chufu (CHN)	157.5 kg	Zhang Guozheng (CHN)	155.0 kg	Youssef Sbai (TUN)	152.5 kg
Clean & Jerk	Zhang Guozheng (CHN)	192.5 kg	Chen Chufu (CHN)	187.5 kg	Mohamed El-Tantawy (EGY)	187.5 kg
Total	Zhang Guozheng (CHN)	347.5 kg	Chen Chufu (CHN)	345.0 kg	Youssef Sbai (TUN)	335.0 kg

== Records ==
Prior to this competition, the existing world records were as follows.

World Record	Snatch	Georgi Markov (BUL)	165.0 kg	Sydney, Australia	20 September 2000
World Record	Clean & Jerk	Galabin Boevski (BUL)	196.5 kg	Sydney, Australia	20 September 2000
World Record	Total	Galabin Boevski (BUL)	357.5 kg	Athens, Greece	24 November 1999

== Results ==
Rank	Athlete	Group	Body weight	Snatch (kg)				Clean & Jerk (kg)				Total
Rank	Athlete	Group	Body weight	1	2	3	Rank	1	2	3	Rank	Total
1st place, gold medalist(s)	Zhang Guozheng (CHN)	A	68.80	150.0	155.0	~~157.5~~	2nd place, silver medalist(s)	185.0	~~192.5~~	192.5	1st place, gold medalist(s)	347.5
2nd place, silver medalist(s)	Chen Chufu (CHN)	A	68.05	150.0	155.0	157.5	1st place, gold medalist(s)	177.5	182.5	187.5	2nd place, silver medalist(s)	345.0
3rd place, bronze medalist(s)	Youssef Sbai (TUN)	A	68.40	147.5	~~152.5~~	152.5	3rd place, bronze medalist(s)	~~180.0~~	~~180.0~~	182.5	5	335.0
4	Ekrem Celil (TUR)	A	68.45	142.5	~~147.5~~	147.5	7	185.0	~~187.5~~	~~187.5~~	4	332.5
5	Mohamed El-Tantawy (EGY)	B	68.80	140.0	~~145.0~~	145.0	8	177.5	182.5	187.5	3rd place, bronze medalist(s)	332.5
6	Turan Mirzayev (AZE)	A	68.90	147.5	~~152.5~~	152.5	4	180.0	~~185.0~~	~~185.0~~	9	332.5
7	Ferit Şen (TUR)	A	68.95	145.0	150.0	~~152.5~~	5	175.0	180.0	~~182.5~~	10	330.0
8	Andrey Matveyev (RUS)	A	68.90	145.0	~~150.0~~	~~150.0~~	9	180.0	~~185.0~~	~~185.0~~	8	325.0
9	Vencelas Dabaya (CMR)	B	67.60	~~137.5~~	137.5	142.5	10	175.0	~~182.5~~	~~182.5~~	11	317.5
10	Georgios Tzelilis (GRE)	A	68.75	142.5	~~147.5~~	~~147.5~~	11	175.0	~~182.5~~	~~182.5~~	12	317.5
11	Giuseppe Ficco (ITA)	B	68.80	135.0	~~140.0~~	~~140.0~~	16	175.0	180.0	~~182.5~~	7	315.0
12	Lucian Maxinianu (ROM)	B	68.05	140.0	~~145.0~~	~~145.0~~	13	160.0	165.0	167.5	16	307.5
13	Romuald Ernault (FRA)	B	68.90	140.0	~~142.5~~	~~142.5~~	14	157.5	162.5	~~165.0~~	17	302.5
14	Yoshito Shintani (JPN)	B	68.15	125.0	130.0	~~132.5~~	18	165.0	~~170.0~~	170.0	13	300.0
15	Afgan Bayramov (AZE)	B	68.45	~~130.0~~	130.0	~~135.0~~	19	160.0	167.5	170.0	14	300.0
16	Maurizio Bombaci (ITA)	B	68.65	125.0	~~130.0~~	~~130.0~~	23	~~165.0~~	165.0	170.0	15	295.0
17	Julio Idrovo (ECU)	C	68.20	~~135.0~~	~~135.0~~	135.0	15	152.5	157.5	~~160.0~~	20	292.5
18	Samuel Suywens (FRA)	C	68.30	127.5	132.5	~~135.0~~	17	~~152.5~~	152.5	~~157.5~~	23	285.0
19	Kuo Cheng-wei (TPE)	C	68.10	120.0	125.0	~~130.0~~	21	150.0	~~157.5~~	157.5	19	282.5
20	Ümürbek Bazarbaýew (TKM)	C	66.50	~~125.0~~	~~125.0~~	125.0	20	155.0	~~160.0~~	~~160.0~~	21	280.0
21	Manuel Martín (ESP)	C	68.30	120.0	~~125.0~~	~~125.0~~	24	150.0	155.0	160.0	18	280.0
22	Ben Turner (AUS)	C	68.75	~~115.0~~	~~115.0~~	115.0	25	150.0	155.0	~~160.0~~	22	270.0
23	Wayne Healy (IRL)	C	68.20	95.0	100.0	~~105.0~~	26	125.0	130.0	135.0	24	235.0
—	Dmitrijs Artamonovs (LAT)	C	68.10	120.0	125.0	~~130.0~~	22	~~150.0~~	~~150.0~~	~~150.0~~	—	—
—	Mehdi Panzvan (IRI)	A	68.40	~~145.0~~	~~145.0~~	~~145.0~~	—	175.0	180.0	~~185.0~~	6	—
—	Hassan Amin Sobhi (EGY)	B	68.80	137.5	142.5	~~145.0~~	12	~~177.5~~	~~177.5~~	~~180.0~~	—	—
—	Javad Khoshdel (IRI)	A	68.90	~~147.5~~	—	—	—	—	—	—	—	—
—	Galabin Boevski (BUL)	A	68.95	~~150.0~~	150.0	~~155.0~~	6	~~187.5~~	~~187.5~~	~~187.5~~	—	—
