= 2010 World Weightlifting Championships – Men's 69 kg =

The men's competition in the lightweight (– 69 kg) division was held on 21 September 2010.

== Schedule ==
Date	Time	Event
21 September 2010	14:00	Group C
21 September 2010	17:00	Group B
21 September 2010	20:00	Group A

== Medalists ==
Event	Gold		Silver		Bronze	
Snatch	Mete Binay (TUR)	160 kg	Armen Ghazaryan (RUS)	148 kg	Triyatno (INA)	146 kg
Clean & Jerk	Kim Kum-sok (PRK)	181 kg	Armen Ghazaryan (RUS)	181 kg	Bredni Roque (CUB)	180 kg
Total	Mete Binay (TUR)	335 kg	Armen Ghazaryan (RUS)	329 kg	Triyatno (INA)	324 kg

== Records ==
Prior to this competition, the existing world records were as follows.

World Record	Snatch	Georgi Markov (BUL)	165 kg	Sydney, Australia	20 September 2000
World Record	Clean & Jerk	Zhang Guozheng (CHN)	197 kg	Qinhuangdao, China	11 September 2003
World Record	Total	Galabin Boevski (BUL)	357 kg	Athens, Greece	24 November 1999

== Results ==
Rank	Athlete	Group	Body weight	Snatch (kg)				Clean & Jerk (kg)				Total
Rank	Athlete	Group	Body weight	1	2	3	Rank	1	2	3	Rank	Total
1st place, gold medalist(s)	Mete Binay (TUR)	A	68.75	156	160	~~166~~	1st place, gold medalist(s)	175	~~181~~	~~182~~	7	335
2nd place, silver medalist(s)	Armen Ghazaryan (RUS)	A	68.64	~~145~~	145	148	2nd place, silver medalist(s)	176	~~180~~	181	2nd place, silver medalist(s)	329
3rd place, bronze medalist(s)	Triyatno (INA)	B	68.85	142	146	~~151~~	3rd place, bronze medalist(s)	175	178	~~181~~	4	324
4	Kim Kum-sok (PRK)	A	68.47	140	~~145~~	~~145~~	10	175	~~181~~	181	1st place, gold medalist(s)	321
5	Bredni Roque (CUB)	B	68.09	134	140	~~145~~	9	170	175	180	3rd place, bronze medalist(s)	320
6	Daniel Godelli (ALB)	B	68.54	135	140	~~145~~	12	167	172	177	5	317
7	Muhammad Begaliev (UZB)	A	68.40	138	~~142~~	143	6	170	~~174~~	~~178~~	12	313
8	Bakhram Mendibaev (UZB)	A	68.47	~~140~~	140	~~144~~	11	168	172	~~177~~	8	312
9	Israel José Rubio (VEN)	C	68.09	138	~~141~~	141	8	167	170	~~171~~	11	311
10	Ekrem Celil (TUR)	B	68.56	135	~~139~~	~~141~~	17	170	~~175~~	175	6	310
11	Briken Calja (ALB)	B	68.70	135	140	~~145~~	13	167	~~172~~	~~173~~	14	307
12	Afgan Bayramov (AZE)	B	68.75	130	~~135~~	135	18	165	171	~~176~~	9	306
13	Phaisan Hansawong (THA)	B	68.80	~~135~~	135	~~140~~	19	163	168	171	10	306
14	Enrique Valencia (ECU)	B	66.91	132	136	~~140~~	16	160	~~165~~	165	15	301
15	Junior Sánchez (VEN)	C	66.03	136	~~140~~	~~140~~	15	157	~~161~~	161	16	297
16	Jhon Villa (COL)	B	68.69	~~135~~	135	137	14	157	~~161~~	~~161~~	19	294
17	Miroslav Janíček (SVK)	C	68.83	122	~~127~~	128	20	150	158	~~162~~	18	286
18	Hamza Jomni (TUN)	C	68.68	~~120~~	122	~~126~~	24	155	160	~~162~~	17	282
19	Chiu Yi-lieh (TPE)	C	68.79	121	~~126~~	~~126~~	25	155	~~161~~	~~161~~	20	276
20	Pasam Rambabu (IND)	C	68.98	122	~~126~~	126	21	145	150	~~155~~	22	276
21	Manuel Martín (ESP)	C	68.59	120	125	~~128~~	22	~~150~~	150	~~160~~	21	275
22	Greg Shushu (RSA)	C	68.31	~~115~~	115	~~120~~	26	130	140	~~150~~	23	255
23	Salah Mohammed Al-Yazidi (QAT)	C	68.63	70	75	~~80~~	27	90	~~95~~	~~95~~	24	165
—	Morteza Rezaeian (IRI)	A	68.33	~~145~~	145	~~150~~	4	~~173~~	~~173~~	~~175~~	—	—
—	Răzvan Martin (ROU)	A	68.98	~~145~~	145	~~150~~	5	~~175~~	~~175~~	~~176~~	—	—
—	Mohamed Abdelbaki (EGY)	B	68.92	140	143	~~146~~	7	~~172~~	~~172~~	~~173~~	—	—
—	Maurizio Bombaci (ITA)	C	68.84	120	125	~~128~~	23	~~161~~	~~162~~	~~162~~	—	—
—	I Ketut Ariana (INA)	C	67.97	~~130~~	~~130~~	~~133~~	—	156	163	167	13	—
—	Tolkunbek Hudaýbergenow (TKM)	B	68.27	~~130~~	~~130~~	~~130~~	—	—	—	—	—	—
—	Vencelas Dabaya (FRA)	A	68.41	~~143~~	~~143~~	~~143~~	—	~~177~~	~~177~~	~~177~~	—	—
—	Jafar Al-Bagir (KSA)	C	67.41	127	134	~~137~~	—	158	~~164~~	~~164~~	—	—
—	Swara Mohammed (IRQ)	C	68.43	127	~~133~~	~~133~~	—	~~155~~	155	~~161~~	—	—
—	Njuh Venatius (CMR)	C	68.63	120	~~125~~	~~125~~	—	155	158	~~162~~	—	—
—	Ahmed Farooq (IRQ)	C	68.03	115	120	125	—	145	152	~~155~~	—	—
DQ	Liao Hui (CHN)	A	68.85	156	160	~~166~~	—	184	198	—	—	—
DQ	Ninel Miculescu (ROU)	A	68.88	150	154	157	—	175	180	~~183~~	—	—
DQ	Sardar Hasanov (AZE)	B	68.45	~~140~~	140	145	—	170	175	~~179~~	—	—

== New records ==
Clean & Jerk	~~198 kg~~	~~Liao Hui (CHN)~~	~~WR~~
Total	~~358 kg~~	~~Liao Hui (CHN)~~	~~WR~~
