= Weightlifting at the 2008 Summer Olympics – Men's 69 kg =

Men's 69 kg at the Games of the XXIX Olympiad
- Venue: Beihang University Gymnasium
- Date: 11–12 August 2008
- Competitors: 30 from 26 nations

Medalists
1st place, gold medalist(s)		Liao Hui	China
2nd place, silver medalist(s)		Vencelas Dabaya	France
3rd place, bronze medalist(s)		Yordanis Borrero	Cuba

The men's 69 kilograms weightlifting event was the third lightest men's event at the weightlifting competition, limiting competitors to a maximum of 69 kilograms of body mass. The competition took place between August 11 and 12 and was divided in three parts due to the large number of competitors. Group C weightlifters competed at 12:30 on the 11th, Group B competed at 10:00 on the 12th, and Group A at 19:00. This event was the seventh Weightlifting event to conclude.

Each lifter performed in both the snatch and clean and jerk lifts, with the final score being the sum of the lifter's best result in each. The athlete received three attempts in each of the two lifts; the score for the lift was the heaviest weight successfully lifted.

== Schedule ==
All times are China Standard Time (UTC+08:00)

Date	Time	Event
11 August 2008	12:30	Group C
12 August 2008	10:00	Group B
12 August 2008	19:00	Group A

== Records ==
Prior to this competition, the existing world and Olympic records were as follows.

World Record	Snatch	Georgi Markov (BUL)	165 kg	Sydney, Australia	20 September 2000
World Record	Clean & Jerk	Zhang Guozheng (CHN)	197 kg	Qinhuangdao, China	11 September 2003
World Record	Total	Galabin Boevski (BUL)	357 kg	Athens, Greece	24 November 1999
Olympic Record	Snatch	Georgi Markov (BUL)	165 kg	Sydney, Australia	20 September 2000
Olympic Record	Clean & Jerk	Galabin Boevski (BUL)	196 kg	Sydney, Australia	20 September 2000
Olympic Record	Total	Galabin Boevski (BUL)	357 kg	Sydney, Australia	20 September 2000

== Results ==
Rank	Athlete	Group	Body weight	Snatch (kg)				Clean & Jerk (kg)				Total
Rank	Athlete	Group	Body weight	1	2	3	Result	1	2	3	Result	Total
1st place, gold medalist(s)	Liao Hui (CHN)	A	68.97	~~153~~	153	158	158	~~185~~	185	190	190	348
2nd place, silver medalist(s)	Vencelas Dabaya (FRA)	A	68.38	147	151	~~153~~	151	187	~~197~~	~~197~~	187	338
3rd place, bronze medalist(s)	Yordanis Borrero (CUB)	A	68.92	140	145	148	148	~~171~~	171	180	180	328
4	Turan Mirzayev (AZE)	A	68.86	142	146	~~149~~	146	181	~~183~~	~~187~~	181	327
5	Kim Chol-jin (PRK)	A	68.64	140	146	~~150~~	146	~~180~~	~~180~~	180	180	326
6	Afgan Bayramov (AZE)	A	68.41	137	142	145	145	175	~~187~~	~~187~~	175	320
7	Sitthisak Suphalak (THA)	A	68.99	141	145	147	147	~~171~~	171	~~175~~	171	318
8	Yoshito Shintani (JPN)	B	68.76	~~130~~	130	135	135	170	175	~~177~~	175	310
9	Tarek Yehia (EGY)	B	68.87	138	~~142~~	~~142~~	138	168	172	~~175~~	172	310
10	Edi Kurniawan (INA)	B	68.85	135	~~140~~	~~140~~	135	165	170	172	172	307
11	Israel José Rubio (VEN)	B	68.23	139	~~143~~	~~143~~	139	167	~~171~~	~~171~~	167	306
12	Artyom Shaloyan (GER)	B	68.79	130	133	135	135	160	165	~~171~~	165	300
13	Luis Miguel Pineda (COL)	B	68.14	127	132	~~135~~	132	161	167	~~170~~	167	299
14	Chinthana Vidanage (SRI)	C	68.90	120	125	128	128	160	165	~~168~~	165	293
15	Francis Luna-Grenier (CAN)	C	68.97	125	~~131~~	131	131	155	162	~~167~~	162	293
16	Welisson Silva (BRA)	C	68.92	130	135	~~138~~	135	155	~~162~~	~~162~~	155	290
17	Răzvan Martin (ROU)	B	68.85	130	~~135~~	~~135~~	130	158	~~165~~	~~165~~	158	288
18	Dimitris Minasidis (CYP)	C	66.32	125	128	~~132~~	128	~~155~~	155	~~161~~	155	283
19	Mark Spooner (NZL)	C	68.86	123	~~127~~	~~127~~	123	153	158	~~161~~	158	281
20	Kamal Bahadur Adhikari (NEP)	C	68.67	107	114	—	114	142	154	—	154	268
21	Logona Esau (TUV)	C	68.14	102	107	110	110	138	144	~~148~~	144	254
22	Nizom Sangov (TJK)	C	66.06	110	115	~~117~~	115	130	135	~~138~~	135	250
—	Shi Zhiyong (CHN)	A	68.17	~~152~~	152	~~157~~	152	—	—	—	—	—
—	Alexandru Roșu (ROU)	B	68.91	~~136~~	136	~~141~~	136	~~165~~	~~165~~	~~165~~	—	—
—	Giorgio De Luca (ITA)	B	68.93	~~131~~	131	~~136~~	131	~~160~~	~~160~~	~~160~~	—	—
—	Gert Trasha (ALB)	B	68.68	~~136~~	~~136~~	~~136~~	—	—	—	—	—	—
—	Edwin Mosquera (COL)	B	68.59	~~134~~	—	—	—	—	—	—	—	—
—	Lee Bae-young (KOR)	A	68.67	150	153	155	155	~~184~~	~~186~~	~~186~~	—	—
DQ	Tigran Martirosyan (ARM)	A	68.90	153	~~156~~	~~156~~	153	~~183~~	~~185~~	185	185	~~338~~
DQ	Alexandru Dudoglo (MDA)	B	68.68	~~145~~	145	~~148~~	145	163	168	172	172	~~317~~

- Tigran Martirosyan of Armenia originally won the bronze medal, but he was disqualified in 2016 after a re-analysis of his samples from the 2008 Olympics resulted in a positive test for stanozolol and turinabol.
- Alexandru Dudoglo of Moldova originally finished ninth, but he was disqualified in 2016 after a re-analysis of his samples from the 2008 Olympics resulted in a positive test for stanozolol.
