= Weightlifting at the 2002 Commonwealth Games – Men's 69 kg =

Weightlifting – Men's 69 kg at the 2002 Commonwealth Games
- Venue: Manchester International Convention Centre
- Dates: 31 July 2002
- Competitors: 11 from 9 nations
- Winning total weight: 310

Medalists
gold medal	Vencelas Dabaya	Cameroon
silver medal	Muhammad Irfan	Pakistan
bronze medal	Stewart Cruickshank	England

The Men's 69 kg weightlifting event at the 2002 Commonwealth Games took place at the Manchester International Convention Centre on 31 July 2002. The weightlifter from Cameroon won the gold, with a combined lift of 310 kg. The silver medal went to Pakistan and bronze to England.

== Schedule ==
All times are Coordinated Universal Time (UTC)

Date	Time	Event
1 August 2002	10:00	Group A

== Records ==
Prior to this competition, the existing world, Commonwealth and Games records were as follows:

World record	Snatch	Georgi Markov (BUL)	165.0 kg	Sydney, Australia	20 September 2000
World record	Clean & Jerk	Galabin Boevski (BUL)	196.5 kg	Sydney, Australia	20 September 2000
World record	Total	Galabin Boevski (BUL)	357.5 kg	Athens, Greece	24 November 1999
Commonwealth record	Snatch				
Commonwealth record	Clean & Jerk				
Commonwealth record	Total				
Games record	Snatch				
Games record	Clean & Jerk				
Games record	Total				

The following records were established during the competition:

Snatch	140.0 kg	Muhammad Irfan (PAK)	GR
Clean & Jerk	170.0 kg	Vencelas Dabaya (CMR)	GR
Total	310.0 kg	Vencelas Dabaya (CMR)	GR

== Results ==
Rank	Athlete	Nation	Group	Body weight	Snatch (kg)					Clean & Jerk (kg)					Total
Rank	Athlete	Nation	Group	Body weight	1	2	3	Result	Rank	1	2	3	Result	Rank	Total
1st place, gold medalist(s)	Vencelas Dabaya	Cameroon	A	67.35	135.0	~~140.0~~	140.0	140.0	1st place, gold medalist(s)	170.0	~~177.5~~	~~177.5~~	170.0	1st place, gold medalist(s)	310.0
2nd place, silver medalist(s)	Muhammad Irfan	Pakistan	A	68.57	135.0	~~140.0~~	140.0	140.0	2nd place, silver medalist(s)	165.0	170.0	~~177.5~~	170.0	2nd place, silver medalist(s)	310.0
3rd place, bronze medalist(s)	Stewart Cruickshank	England	A	68.46	~~130.0~~	~~130.0~~	132.5	132.5	4	160.0	165.0	~~167.5~~	165.0	4	297.5
4	Muhamad Hidayat Hamidon	Malaysia	A	68.91	125.0	130.0	~~132.5~~	130.0	5	~~165.0~~	~~165.0~~	167.5	167.5	3rd place, bronze medalist(s)	297.5
5	Yukio Peter	Nauru	A	68.73	127.5	~~132.5~~	~~132.5~~	127.5	6	162.5	~~167.5~~	~~172.5~~	162.5	5	290.0
6	Govinda Vadivelu	India	A	68.68	117.5	122.5	~~125.0~~	122.5	8	155.0	~~162.5~~	162.5	162.5	6	285.0
7	Sudhir Kumar Chitradurga	India	A	68.54	130.0	~~132.5~~	135.0	135.0	3rd place, bronze medalist(s)	147.5	~~155.0~~	~~155.0~~	147.5	7	282.5
8	Marco Dumberry	Canada	A	68.55	117.5	~~122.5~~	122.5	122.5	7	137.5	142.5	~~150.0~~	142.5	8	265.0
9	Ray Williams	Wales	A	68.58	105.0	110.0	~~112.5~~	110.0	9	120.0	130.0	140.0	140.0	9	250.0
10	Arfon Roberts	Wales	A	68.43	102.5	~~107.5~~	107.5	107.5	10	137.5	~~142.5~~	~~142.5~~	137.5	10	245.0
11	Pita Vakaafi	Niue	A	66.03	67.5	~~72.5~~	~~72.5~~	67.5	11	80.0	85.0	90.0	90.0	11	157.5
