= Weightlifting at the 2006 Asian Games – Men's 69 kg =

Men's 69 kg at the 2006 Asian Games
- Venue: Al-Dana Banquet Hall
- Date: 3 December 2006
- Competitors: 16 from 13 nations

Medalists
gold medal	Zhang Guozheng	China
silver medal	Shi Zhiyong	China
bronze medal	Kim Sun-bae	South Korea

The men's 69 kilograms event at the 2006 Asian Games took place on December 3, 2006 at Al-Dana Banquet Hall in Doha.

== Schedule ==
All times are Arabia Standard Time (UTC+03:00)

Date	Time	Event
Sunday, 3 December 2006	11:00	Group B
Sunday, 3 December 2006	19:00	Group A

== Records ==
Prior to this competition, the existing world, Asian and Games records were as follows.

World Record	Snatch	Georgi Markov (BUL)	165 kg	Sydney, Australia	20 September 2000
World Record	Clean & Jerk	Zhang Guozheng (CHN)	197 kg	Qinhuangdao, China	11 September 2003
World Record	Total	Galabin Boevski (BUL)	357 kg	Athens, Greece	24 November 1999
Asian Record	Snatch	Zhang Guozheng (CHN)	160 kg	Athens, Greece	18 August 2004
Asian Record	Clean & Jerk	Zhang Guozheng (CHN)	197 kg	Qinhuangdao, China	11 September 2003
Asian Record	Total	Zhang Guozheng (CHN)	352 kg	Qinhuangdao, China	11 September 2003
Games Record	Snatch	Wan Jianhui (CHN)	155 kg	Bangkok, Thailand	9 December 1998
Games Record	Clean & Jerk	Kim Hak-bong (KOR)	195 kg	Bangkok, Thailand	9 December 1998
Games Record	Total	Zhang Guozheng (CHN)	345 kg	Busan, South Korea	3 October 2002

== Results ==
Legend

- NM — No mark

Rank	Athlete	Group	Body weight	Snatch (kg)				Clean & Jerk (kg)				Total
Rank	Athlete	Group	Body weight	1	2	3	Result	1	2	3	Result	Total
1st place, gold medalist(s)	Zhang Guozheng (CHN)	A	68.99	145	150	152	152	175	180	184	184	336
2nd place, silver medalist(s)	Shi Zhiyong (CHN)	A	67.90	145	150	155	155	~~175~~	175	180	180	335
3rd place, bronze medalist(s)	Kim Sun-bae (KOR)	A	68.80	130	134	137	137	170	~~180~~	~~180~~	170	307
4	Sitthisak Suphalak (THA)	A	68.60	130	135	140	140	162	~~170~~	~~170~~	162	302
5	Wu Tsung-ling (TPE)	A	68.66	130	135	~~137~~	135	158	162	166	166	301
6	Ronnayuth Amnoiwong (THA)	A	68.17	127	~~132~~	~~133~~	127	165	~~170~~	172	172	299
7	Kuanysh Rakhatov (KAZ)	A	67.98	135	~~138~~	~~140~~	135	~~155~~	155	~~160~~	155	290
8	Mohd Hidayat Hamidon (MAS)	A	68.17	125	~~129~~	~~129~~	125	~~160~~	~~160~~	160	160	285
9	Kutman Moldodosov (KGZ)	A	68.16	130	~~135~~	~~135~~	130	152	~~156~~	~~156~~	152	282
10	Hasan Al-Jasem (SYR)	A	68.68	~~125~~	125	~~130~~	125	146	~~156~~	~~156~~	146	271
11	Kamal Bahadur Adhikari (NEP)	A	67.47	~~110~~	~~110~~	110	110	145	~~154~~	~~154~~	145	255
12	Aman Meredow (TKM)	B	68.72	110	117	~~127~~	117	~~130~~	130	~~136~~	130	247
13	Oussama Misto (LIB)	B	68.13	100	106	110	110	120	130	135	135	245
14	Edelijo Mesquita (TLS)	B	63.47	55	~~60~~	~~60~~	55	70	75	~~90~~	75	130
—	Yousuf Al-Hasni (OMA)	B	68.03	~~98~~	~~101~~	~~101~~	—	—	—	—	—	NM
—	Kambar Toktonaliev (KGZ)	A	68.69	~~128~~	~~128~~	~~129~~	—	—	—	—	—	NM
