= Mehmed Fikretov =

Bulgarian weightlifter

Personal information
- Nationality: Bulgaria
- Born: 18 November 1986 (age 39)
- Weight: 68.74 kg (151.5 lb)

Sport
- Country: Bulgaria
- Sport: Weightlifting
- Weight class: 69 kg
- Retired: 2008

Mehmed Fikretov (Bulgarian: Мехмед Фикретов; born 18 November 1986) is a retired Bulgarian male weightlifter, most recently competing in the 69 kg division at the 2008 European Weightlifting Championships.

== Career ==
Fikretov was among 11 athletes on the Bulgarian Weightlifting Federation that tested positive for Metandienone in an out of competition drug test. The Bulgarian Weightlifting Federation then decided to withdraw from the 2008 Olympic Games. The athletes that were banned from the 2008 Olympic Games are:

- Velichko Cholakov
- Demir Demirev
- Mehmed Fikretov
- Ivaylo Filev
- Gergana Kirilova
- Milka Maneva
- Georgi Markov (Lifetime ban)
- Ivan Markov
- Donka Mincheva
- Ivan Stoitsov
- Alan Tsagaev (Lifetime ban)

== Major results ==
Year	Venue	Weight	Snatch (kg)				Clean & Jerk (kg)				Total	Rank
Year	Venue	Weight	1	2	3	Rank	1	2	3	Rank	Total	Rank
World Championships
2005	Doha, Qatar	69 kg	130	135	~~138~~	9	170	~~175~~	175	5	310	5
2006	Santo Domingo, Dominican Republic	69 kg	130	135	~~138~~	10	170	~~175~~	~~179~~	9	305	7
2007	Chiang Mai, Thailand	69 kg	139	142	~~144~~	9	175	~~182~~	~~183~~	7	317	7
European Championships
2005	Sofia, Bulgaria	69 kg	130.0	~~135.0~~	135.0	4	170.0	~~175.0~~	177.5	3rd place, bronze medalist(s)	312.5	3rd place, bronze medalist(s)
2006	Władysławowo, Poland	69 kg	130	135	138	7	170	~~180~~	~~180~~	4	308	4
2008	Lignano Sabbiadoro, Italy	69 kg	136	~~139~~	140	7	175	~~180~~	~~181~~	3rd place, bronze medalist(s)	315	3rd place, bronze medalist(s)
