= Ivan Stoitsov =

Bulgarian weightlifter (born 1985)

Personal information
- Full name: Ivan Stoitsov
- Born: 22 March 1985 (age 41) Plovdiv, Bulgaria
- Height: 167 cm (5 ft 6 in)
- Weight: 76.83 kg (169.4 lb)

Sport
- Country: Bulgaria
- Sport: Weightlifting
- Weight class: 77 kg
- Club: Levski Sofia (BUL)
- Team: National team
- Updated on 9 September 2016

Ivan Stoitsov (Иван Стоицов, born 22 March 1985 in Plovdiv) is a Bulgarian male weightlifter, competing in the 77 kg category and representing Bulgaria at international competitions. He participated at the 2004 Summer Olympics in the 77 kg event. He competed at world championships, most recently at the 2007 World Weightlifting Championships.

Stoitsov tested positive for a steroid in 2008, and therefore Bulgaria's weightlifting federation withdrew its team from the 2008 Summer Olympics. Eight members of the men's team and three women tested positive during out-of-competition tests conducted on June 8 and June 9. Apart from Tsagaev the athletes who tested positive were Ivailo Filev, Demir Demirev, Mehmed Fikretov, Alan Tsagaev, Ivan Markov, Georgi Markov, Velichko Cholakov, Milka Maneva, Donka Mincheva and Gergana Kirilova.

== Major results ==
Year	Venue	Weight	Snatch (kg)				Clean & Jerk (kg)				Total	Rank
Year	Venue	Weight	1	2	3	Rank	1	2	3	Rank	Total	Rank
Summer Olympics
2004	Athens, Greece	77 kg										7
World Championships
2007	Chiang Mai, Thailand	77 kg	~~158~~	158	~~160~~	6	193	200	205	1st place, gold medalist(s)	363	1st place, gold medalist(s)
