= 1999 World Weightlifting Championships – Men's 62 kg =

The Men's Featherweight Weightlifting Event (– 62 kg) is the second men's weight class event at the weightlifting competition, limited to competitors with a maximum of 62 kilograms of body mass. The competition at the 1999 World Weightlifting Championships took place in Athens, Greece on November 22, 1999.

Each lifter performed in both the snatch and clean and jerk lifts, with the final score being the sum of the lifter's best result in each. The athlete received three attempts in each of the two lifts; the score for the lift was the heaviest weight successfully lifted.

== Medalists ==
Event	Gold		Silver		Bronze	
Snatch	Shi Zhiyong (CHN)	147.5 kg	Leonidas Sabanis (GRE)	145.0 kg	Sevdalin Minchev (BUL)	142.5 kg
Clean & Jerk	Le Maosheng (CHN)	180.0 kg	Marcus Stephen (NRU)	172.5 kg	Sevdalin Minchev (BUL)	172.5 kg
Total	Le Maosheng (CHN)	320.0 kg	Leonidas Sabanis (GRE)	315.0 kg	Sevdalin Minchev (BUL)	315.0 kg

== Records ==
Prior to this competition, the existing world records were as follows.

World Record	Snatch	Shi Zhiyong (CHN)	150.0 kg	Savannah, United States	4 July 1999
World Record	Clean & Jerk	World Standard	180.0 kg	—	1 January 1998
World Record	Total	World Standard	325.0 kg	—	1 January 1998

== Results ==
Rank	Athlete	Body weight	Snatch (kg)				Clean & Jerk (kg)				Total
Rank	Athlete	Body weight	1	2	3	Rank	1	2	3	Rank	Total
1st place, gold medalist(s)	Le Maosheng (CHN)	61.33	135.0	140.0	~~145.0~~	4	172.5	177.5	180.5	1st place, gold medalist(s)	320.0
2nd place, silver medalist(s)	Leonidas Sabanis (GRE)	61.40	~~145.0~~	145.0	~~150.0~~	2nd place, silver medalist(s)	170.0	~~175.0~~	~~175.0~~	5	315.0
3rd place, bronze medalist(s)	Sevdalin Minchev (BUL)	61.60	135.0	140.0	142.5	3rd place, bronze medalist(s)	167.5	~~172.5~~	172.5	3rd place, bronze medalist(s)	315.0
4	Shi Zhiyong (CHN)	61.63	~~147.5~~	147.5	~~152.5~~	1st place, gold medalist(s)	167.5	~~172.5~~	~~172.5~~	7	315.0
5	Nikolaj Pešalov (CRO)	61.61	140.0	~~145.0~~	~~145.0~~	6	172.5	~~177.5~~	~~180.0~~	4	312.5
6	Henadzi Aliashchuk (BLR)	61.51	130.0	135.0	~~137.5~~	9	167.5	~~172.5~~	~~172.5~~	6	302.5
7	Marcus Stephen (NRU)	61.38	122.5	~~127.5~~	127.5	15	167.5	172.5	~~175.0~~	2nd place, silver medalist(s)	300.0
8	Hiroshi Ikehata (JPN)	61.77	~~132.5~~	132.5	~~137.5~~	10	165.0	~~170.0~~	~~170.0~~	8	297.5
9	Hafız Süleymanoğlu (TUR)	61.40	~~135.0~~	~~135.0~~	135.0	8	160.0	~~167.5~~	~~170.0~~	10	295.0
10	Vladimir Popov (MDA)	61.40	127.5	132.5	135.0	7	~~155.0~~	155.0	160.0	11	295.0
11	Zoltán Farkas (HUN)	61.93	132.5	~~137.5~~	~~137.5~~	11	152.5	~~160.0~~	160.0	14	292.5
12	Yurik Sarkisyan (AUS)	61.79	125.0	~~130.0~~	~~130.0~~	20	160.0	~~165.0~~	165.0	9	290.0
13	Lee Bae-young (KOR)	61.87	130.0	~~135.0~~	—	14	~~160.0~~	160.0	~~172.5~~	13	290.0
14	Elkhan Suleymanov (AZE)	61.65	125.0	~~130.0~~	130.0	12	152.5	157.5	~~162.5~~	9	287.5
15	Vasile Costea (ROM)	61.87	127.5	~~132.5~~	~~132.5~~	16	160.0	~~165.0~~	~~165.0~~	12	287.5
16	Abdulmohsen Al-Bagir (KSA)	61.59	125.0	~~130.0~~	~~130.0~~	17	150.0	155.0	~~160.0~~	17	280.0
17	Tatsuo Hato (JPN)	61.60	117.5	122.5	125.0	18	147.5	155.0	~~160.0~~	18	280.0
18	Dmitriy Lomakin (KAZ)	61.76	125.0	130.0	~~135.0~~	13	~~150.0~~	150.0	~~155.0~~	26	280.0
19	Muneer Abdullatif Ali (QAT)	61.80	117.5	122.5	~~125.0~~	21	150.0	157.5	~~160.0~~	16	280.0
20	Atef Jarray (TUN)	61.66	125.0	~~130.0~~	~~132.5~~	19	145.0	~~152.5~~	152.5	21	277.5
21	Jorge Guiza (COL)	61.80	115.0	~~117.5~~	117.5	26	155.0	~~155.0~~	155.0	19	272.5
22	Tom Goegebuer (BEL)	61.13	115.0	~~120.0~~	120.0	22	145.0	~~150.0~~	150.0	22	270.0
23	Yousef Kordi (IRI)	61.53	~~120.0~~	~~120.0~~	120.0	23	150.0	~~155.0~~	~~155.0~~	24	270.0
24	Mohamed Osman (EGY)	61.62	~~115.0~~	115.0	~~117.5~~	35	~~150.0~~	150.0	152.5	20	267.5
25	David Pavliashvili (GEO)	61.77	~~117.5~~	~~117.5~~	117.5	25	142.5	150.0	~~152.5~~	27	267.5
26	Amílcar Pernía (VEN)	61.46	115.0	~~117.5~~	~~120.0~~	32	150.0	~~155.0~~	~~155.0~~	23	265.0
27	Luciano Votrea (FRA)	61.55	107.5	112.5	~~115.0~~	37	150.0	~~155.0~~	~~155.0~~	25	262.5
28	LeGrand Sakamaki (USA)	61.87	~~117.5~~	117.5	~~122.5~~	27	145.0	~~150.0~~	~~152.5~~	29	262.5
29	Laurent Pedreno (FRA)	61.81	115.0	120.0	~~122.5~~	24	135.0	~~140.0~~	140.0	33	260.0
30	José Utria (COL)	61.89	112.5	117.5	~~122.5~~	28	~~142.5~~	142.5	~~147.5~~	30	260.0
31	Renato Sulkja (ALB)	61.99	107.5	112.5	117.5	29	132.5	140.0	142.5	31	260.0
32	Marco Piconese (ITA)	61.62	110.5	~~115.0~~	115.0	34	~~140.0~~	140.0	~~145.0~~	32	255.0
33	Ali Hidaiel (IRQ)	61.62	115.0	~~120.0~~	~~120.0~~	33	~~135.0~~	~~135.0~~	135.0	37	250.0
34	Wayne Healy (IRL)	61.66	105.0	110.0	112.5	38	132.5	137.5	~~142.5~~	35	250.0
35	Marvin Jiménez (GUA)	61.92	110.0	~~115.0~~	~~115.0~~	39	~~140.0~~	140.0	~~150.0~~	34	250.0
36	Erikas Maldžius (LTU)	61.36	115.0	—	—	31	132.5	~~140.0~~	~~140.0~~	39	247.5
37	Jorge García (GUA)	61.31	~~100.0~~	100.0	~~105.0~~	40	125.0	130.0	135.0	36	235.0
38	Oussama Misto (LIB)	61.63	~~100.0~~	100.0	~~105.0~~	41	125.0	132.5	135.0	38	235.0
—	Stefan Georgiev (BUL)	61.51	135.0	~~140.0~~	140.0	5	~~170.0~~	~~170.0~~	~~170.0~~	—	—
—	Ümürbek Bazarbaýew (TKM)	61.06	115.0	~~120.0~~	~~120.0~~	30	~~140.0~~	~~140.0~~	~~140.0~~	—	—
—	Vencelas Dabaya (CMR)	61.77	~~110.0~~	112.5	115.0	36	~~150.0~~	~~150.0~~	~~150.0~~	—	—
—	Zafar Tagiyev (AZE)	61.90	~~117.5~~	~~117.5~~	~~117.5~~	—	147.5	~~152.5~~	~~152.5~~	28	—
—	Armando Mece (ALB)	61.77	~~102.5~~	~~102.5~~	~~102.5~~	—	125.0	~~130.0~~	~~130.0~~	40	—
—	Mihail Şuwaýew (TKM)	61.20	~~120.0~~	~~120.0~~	—	—	~~150.0~~	—	—	—	—

== New records ==
Clean & Jerk	180.5 kg	Le Maosheng (CHN)	WR
