= Constantine Vasiliades =

Cypriot weightlifter (born 1985)

Personal information
- Full name: Constantine Vasiliades
- Born: 9 April 1985 (age 41)
- Weight: 68.72 kg (151.5 lb)

Sport
- Country: Cyprus
- Sport: Weightlifting
- Weight class: 69 kg
- Team: National Team
- Updated on 8 September 2016

Constantine Vasiliades (born 9 April 1985) is a Cypriot male weightlifter, competing in the 69 kg category and representing Cyprus at international competitions. He competed at world championships, most recently at the 2007 World Weightlifting Championships. He participated at the 2010 Commonwealth Games in the 69 kg event.

== Major competitions ==
Year	Venue	Weight	Snatch (kg)				Clean & Jerk (kg)				Total	Rank
Year	Venue	Weight	1	2	3	Rank	1	2	3	Rank	Total	Rank
Commonwealth Games
2010	Delhi, India	69 kg	105	~~110~~	~~110~~	—N/a	125	~~130~~	130	—N/a	235	14
World Championships
2007	Chiang Mai, Thailand	69 kg	100	105	108	56	130	135	~~137~~	57	243	55
