= Abdulmohsen Al-Bagir =

Saudi Arabian weightlifter (born 1976)

Personal information
- Full name: Abdul Mohsen Al-Bagir
- Born: 24 February 1976 (age 50)
- Height: 158 cm (5 ft 2 in)
- Weight: 68.23 kg (150 lb)

Sport
- Country: Saudi Arabia
- Sport: Weightlifting
- Weight class: 69 kg (152 lb)
- Team: National team
- Updated on 17 September 2016

Abdul Mohsen Al-Bagir (Arabic: عبد المحسن الباقر, born 24 February 1976) is a Saudi Arabian male weightlifter, competing in the 69 kg category and representing Saudi Arabia at international competitions. He participated at the 2004 Summer Olympics in the 69 kg event. He competed at world championships, most recently at the 2003 World Weightlifting Championships.

== Major results ==
Year	Venue	Weight	Snatch (kg)				Clean & Jerk (kg)				Total	Rank
Year	Venue	Weight	1	2	3	Rank	1	2	3	Rank	Total	Rank
Summer Olympics
2004	Athens, Italy	69 kg				—N/a				—N/a		12
World Championships
2003	Vancouver, Canada	69 kg	140	~~145~~	~~145~~	11	~~175~~	~~175~~	~~175~~	---	0	---
1999	Piraeus, Greece	62 kg	125	~~130~~	~~130~~	17	150	155	~~160~~	17	280	16
