= Zoltán Kecskés =

Hungarian weightlifter

Personal information
- Full name: Zoltan Kecskes
- Born: 14 July 1974 (age 52) Valea lui Mihai, Romania
- Height: 167 cm (5 ft 6 in)
- Weight: 68.75 kg (151.6 lb)

Sport
- Country: Hungary
- Sport: Weightlifting
- Weight class: 69 kg
- Club: Debreceni VSC, Debrecen (HUN)
- Team: National team
- Updated on 14 September 2016

Zoltan Kecskes (born 14 July 1974 in Valea lui Mihai) is a Romanian born Hungarian male weightlifter, competing in the 69 kg category and representing Hungary at international competitions. He participated at the 1996 Summer Olympics in the 64 kg event. He competed at world championships, most recently at the 2003 World Weightlifting Championships.

He was caught for using Anabolic steroid.

== Major results ==
Year	Venue	Weight	Snatch (kg)					Clean & Jerk (kg)					Total	Rank
Year	Venue	Weight	1	2	3	Results	Rank	1	2	3	Results	Rank	Total	Rank
Summer Olympics
1996	Atlanta, United States	64 kg	130.0	135.0	~~137.5~~	135.0	9	162.5	167.5	~~170.0~~	167.5	7	302.5	8
World Championships
2003	Vancouver, Canada	69 kg	~~145.0~~	145.0	~~150.0~~	145.0	8	175.0	~~180.0~~	~~180.0~~	175.0	11	320.0	8
1999	Athens, Greece	77 kg	145.0	~~150.0~~	~~150.0~~	145.0	25	175.0	180.0	~~185.0~~	180.0	25	325.0	26
1995	Guangzhou, China	64 kg	—N/a	—N/a	—N/a	130.0	12	—N/a	—N/a	—N/a	165.0	8	295.0	10
European Championships
2003	Loutraki, Greece	69 kg	145.0	~~150.0~~	~~150.0~~	145.0	7	175.0	180.0	~~185.0~~	180.0	5	325.0	5
2002	Antalya, Turkey	69 kg	140.0	145.0	147.5	147.5	6	170.0	175.0	180.0	180.0	5	327.5	5
1995	Warsaw, Poland	64 kg	—N/a	—N/a	—N/a	—	—	—N/a	—N/a	—N/a	—	—	—	—
1994	Sokolov, Czech Republic	59 kg	—N/a	—N/a	—N/a	125.0	4	—N/a	—N/a	—N/a	155.0	6	280.0	5
