= 2007 World Weightlifting Championships =

International weightlifting competition

2007 World Championships
- Host city: Chiang Mai, Thailand
- Dates: 17–26 September
- Main venue: 700th Anniversary Sports Complex

The Royal World Weightlifting Championships 2007 were held at the 700th Anniversary Sports Complex in Chiang Mai, Thailand. The event took place from September 17 to September 26, 2007.

== Medal summary ==
=== Men ===
Event	Gold		Silver		Bronze	
56 kg
Snatch	Li Zheng; China	130 kg	Cha Kum-chol; North Korea	128 kg	Hoàng Anh Tuấn; Vietnam	127 kg
Clean & Jerk	Sergio Álvarez; Cuba	156 kg	Cha Kum-chol; North Korea	155 kg	Eko Yuli Irawan; Indonesia	154 kg
Total	Cha Kum-chol; North Korea	283 kg	Li Zheng; China	283 kg	Eko Yuli Irawan; Indonesia	278 kg
62 kg
Snatch	Yang Fan; China	142 kg	Im Yong-su; North Korea	142 kg	Ivaylo Filev; Bulgaria	138 kg
Clean & Jerk	Yang Fan; China	173 kg	Im Yong-su; North Korea	173 kg	Ivaylo Filev; Bulgaria	163 kg
Total	Yang Fan; China	315 kg	Im Yong-su; North Korea	315 kg	Ivaylo Filev; Bulgaria	301 kg
69 kg
Snatch	Shi Zhiyong; China	158 kg	Zhang Guozheng; China	155 kg	Mete Binay; Turkey	154 kg
Clean & Jerk	Zhang Guozheng; China	192 kg	Vencelas Dabaya; France	187 kg	Kim Chol-jin; North Korea	185 kg
Total	Zhang Guozheng; China	347 kg	Shi Zhiyong; China	338 kg	Demir Demirev; Bulgaria	334 kg
77 kg
Snatch	Li Hongli; China	166 kg	Gevorg Davtyan; Armenia	164 kg	Oleg Perepetchenov; Russia	163 kg
Clean & Jerk	Ivan Stoitsov; Bulgaria	205 kg	Kim Kwang-hoon; South Korea	201 kg	Sa Jae-hyouk; South Korea	200 kg
Total	Ivan Stoitsov; Bulgaria	363 kg	Gevorg Davtyan; Armenia	362 kg	Li Hongli; China	361 kg
85 kg
Snatch	Andrei Rybakou; Belarus	187 kg WR	Aslanbek Ediev; Russia	172 kg	Georgi Markov; Bulgaria	172 kg
Clean & Jerk	Andrei Rybakou; Belarus	206 kg	José Oliver Ruiz; Colombia	205 kg	Jadier Valladares; Cuba	201 kg
Total	Andrei Rybakou; Belarus	393 kg	Aslanbek Ediev; Russia	372 kg	Vadzim Straltsou; Belarus	370 kg
94 kg
Snatch	Roman Konstantinov; Russia	177 kg	Eduard Tyukin; Kazakhstan	176 kg	Eugen Bratan; Moldova	175 kg
Clean & Jerk	Yoandry Hernández; Cuba	220 kg	Roman Konstantinov; Russia	220 kg	Szymon Kołecki; Poland	219 kg
Total	Roman Konstantinov; Russia	397 kg	Yoandry Hernández; Cuba	393 kg	Szymon Kołecki; Poland	392 kg
105 kg
Snatch	Andrei Aramnau; Belarus	195 kg	Bakhyt Akhmetov; Kazakhstan	190 kg	Martin Tešovič; Slovakia	190 kg
Clean & Jerk	Alan Tsagaev; Bulgaria	231 kg	Andrei Aramnau; Belarus	228 kg	Nikolaos Kourtidis; Greece	226 kg
Total	Andrei Aramnau; Belarus	423 kg	Alan Tsagaev; Bulgaria	411 kg	Dmitry Klokov; Russia	411 kg
+105 kg
Snatch	Viktors Ščerbatihs; Latvia	202 kg	Evgeny Chigishev; Russia	201 kg	Velichko Cholakov; Bulgaria	201 kg
Clean & Jerk	Evgeny Chigishev; Russia	240 kg	Jaber Saeed Salem; Qatar	240 kg	Viktors Ščerbatihs; Latvia	240 kg
Total	Viktors Ščerbatihs; Latvia	442 kg	Evgeny Chigishev; Russia	441 kg	Jaber Saeed Salem; Qatar	435 kg

=== Women ===
Event	Gold		Silver		Bronze	
48 kg
Snatch	Chen Xiexia; China	96 kg	Pramsiri Bunphithak; Thailand	86 kg	Nurcan Taylan; Turkey	85 kg
Clean & Jerk	Chen Xiexia; China	118 kg	Pensiri Laosirikul; Thailand	112 kg	Pramsiri Bunphithak; Thailand	110 kg
Total	Chen Xiexia; China	214 kg	Pramsiri Bunphithak; Thailand	196 kg	Pensiri Laosirikul; Thailand	195 kg
53 kg
Snatch	Yoon Jin-hee; South Korea	94 kg	Nastassia Novikava; Belarus	94 kg	Li Ping; China	93 kg
Clean & Jerk	Li Ping; China	126 kg	Nastassia Novikava; Belarus	119 kg	Yoon Jin-hee; South Korea	117 kg
Total	Li Ping; China	219 kg	Nastassia Novikava; Belarus	213 kg	Yoon Jin-hee; South Korea	211 kg
58 kg
Snatch	Marina Shainova; Russia	105 kg	Qiu Hongmei; China	103 kg	O Jong-ae; North Korea	100 kg
Clean & Jerk	Qiu Hongmei; China	135 kg	Marina Shainova; Russia	132 kg	O Jong-ae; North Korea	127 kg
Total	Qiu Hongmei; China	238 kg	Marina Shainova; Russia	237 kg	O Jong-ae; North Korea	227 kg
63 kg
Snatch	Liu Haixia; China	115 kg	Svetlana Tsarukaeva; Russia	115 kg	Pak Hyon-suk; North Korea	105 kg
Clean & Jerk	Liu Haixia; China	142 kg	Pak Hyon-suk; North Korea	135 kg	Svetlana Tsarukaeva; Russia	135 kg
Total	Liu Haixia; China	257 kg WR	Svetlana Tsarukaeva; Russia	250 kg	Pak Hyon-suk; North Korea	240 kg
69 kg
Snatch	Liu Chunhong; China	121 kg	Oxana Slivenko; Russia	120 kg	Nataliya Davydova; Ukraine	114 kg
Clean & Jerk	Oxana Slivenko; Russia	156 kg	Liu Chunhong; China	150 kg	Hong Yong-ok; North Korea	133 kg
Total	Oxana Slivenko; Russia	276 kg WR	Liu Chunhong; China	271 kg	Nataliya Davydova; Ukraine	244 kg
75 kg
Snatch	Natalya Zabolotnaya; Russia	131 kg WR	Cao Lei; China	128 kg	Nadezhda Evstyukhina; Russia	128 kg
Clean & Jerk	Cao Lei; China	158 kg	Nadezhda Evstyukhina; Russia	150 kg	Natalya Zabolotnaya; Russia	150 kg
Total	Cao Lei; China	286 kg	Natalya Zabolotnaya; Russia	281 kg	Nadezhda Evstyukhina; Russia	278 kg
+75 kg
Snatch	Mu Shuangshuang; China	139 kg	Jang Mi-ran; South Korea	138 kg	Olha Korobka; Ukraine	126 kg
Clean & Jerk	Jang Mi-ran; South Korea	181 kg	Mu Shuangshuang; China	180 kg	Olha Korobka; Ukraine	155 kg
Total	Jang Mi-ran; South Korea	319 kg	Mu Shuangshuang; China	319 kg WR	Olha Korobka; Ukraine	281 kg

== Medal table ==
Ranking by Big (Total result) medals

Rank	Nation	Gold	Silver	Bronze	Total
1	China	7	4	1	12
2	Russia	2	5	2	9
3	Belarus	2	1	1	4
4	Bulgaria	1	1	2	4
4	North Korea	1	1	2	4
6	South Korea	1	0	1	2
7	Latvia	1	0	0	1
8	Thailand	0	1	1	2
9	Armenia	0	1	0	1
9	Cuba	0	1	0	1
11	Ukraine	0	0	2	2
12	Indonesia	0	0	1	1
12	Poland	0	0	1	1
12	Qatar	0	0	1	1
Totals (14 entries)		15	15	15	45

Ranking by all medals: Big (Total result) and Small (Snatch and Clean & Jerk)

Rank	Nation	Gold	Silver	Bronze	Total
1	China	22	9	2	33
2	Russia	7	12	6	25
3	Belarus	5	4	1	10
4	South Korea	3	2	3	8
5	Bulgaria	3	1	6	10
6	Cuba	2	1	1	4
7	Latvia	2	0	1	3
8	North Korea	1	6	7	14
9	Thailand	0	3	2	5
10	Armenia	0	2	0	2
10	Kazakhstan	0	2	0	2
12	Qatar	0	1	1	2
13	Colombia	0	1	0	1
13	France	0	1	0	1
15	Ukraine	0	0	5	5
16	Indonesia	0	0	2	2
16	Poland	0	0	2	2
16	Turkey	0	0	2	2
19	Greece	0	0	1	1
19	Moldova	0	0	1	1
19	Slovakia	0	0	1	1
19	Vietnam	0	0	1	1
Totals (22 entries)		45	45	45	135

== Team ranking ==
=== Men ===
Rank	Team	Points
1	China	523
2	Bulgaria	520
3	Russia	501
4	Belarus	484
5	Cuba	384
6	Poland	332

=== Women ===
Rank	Team	Points
1	China	565
2	Russia	450
3	Thailand	390
4	North Korea	371
5	South Korea	360
6	Ukraine	308

== Participating nations ==
580 competitors from 82 nations participated.

- Argentina (1)
- Armenia (15)
- Australia (3)
- Azerbaijan (8)
- Bangladesh (2)
- Belarus (15)
- Belgium (1)
- Bulgaria (15)
- Cameroon (2)
- Canada (12)
- China (15)
- Chinese Taipei (15)
- Colombia (15)
- Cook Islands (1)
- Cuba (8)
- Cyprus (2)
- Czech Republic (6)
- Dominican Republic (7)
- Ecuador (2)
- Egypt (10)
- El Salvador (2)
- Federated States of Micronesia (1)
- Finland (4)
- France (15)
- Georgia (6)
- Germany (10)
- Great Britain (6)
- Greece (15)
- Honduras (2)
- Hong Kong (1)
- Hungary (11)
- India (9)
- Indonesia (14)
- Iran (8)
- Iraq (5)
- Israel (2)
- Italy (9)
- Japan (15)
- Kazakhstan (15)
- Kiribati (1)
- Kyrgyzstan (6)
- Latvia (6)
- Lithuania (2)
- Macau (2)
- Malaysia (6)
- Mexico (7)
- Moldova (7)
- Monaco (1)
- Myanmar (6)
- Nauru (4)
- Nepal (2)
- Netherlands (1)
- Nigeria (8)
- North Korea (12)
- Norway (1)
- Palau (1)
- Papua New Guinea (1)
- Poland (15)
- Qatar (3)
- Romania (7)
- Russia (15)
- Samoa (2)
- Slovakia (8)
- Solomon Islands (1)
- South Africa (5)
- South Korea (15)
- Spain (15)
- Sri Lanka (1)
- Syria (2)
- Tajikistan (1)
- Thailand (15)
- Tonga (1)
- Tunisia (3)
- Turkey (15)
- Turkmenistan (8)
- Tuvalu (1)
- Ukraine (15)
- United States (15)
- Uzbekistan (8)
- Venezuela (14)
- Vietnam (14)
- Yemen (2)
