= Youssef Sbai =

Tunisian weightlifter (born 1978)

Personal information
- Full name: Youssef Sbaî
- Born: 20 September 1978 (age 47)
- Height: 168 cm (5 ft 6 in)
- Weight: 68.43 kg (150.9 lb)

Sport
- Country: Morocco
- Sport: Weightlifting
- Weight class: 69 kg
- Team: National team
- Updated on 1 January 2001

Youssef Ben Abdel Jaoued Sbaî (يوسف سباعي, born 20 September 1978) is a Tunisian male weightlifter, competing in the 69 kg category and representing Tunisia at international competitions. He participated at the 2000 Summer Olympics in the 69 kg event and also at the 2004 Summer Olympics in the 69 kg event. He competed at world championships, most recently at the 2007 World Weightlifting Championships.

== Major results ==
Year	Venue	Weight	Snatch (kg)				Clean & Jerk (kg)				Total	Rank
Year	Venue	Weight	1	2	3	Rank	1	2	3	Rank	Total	Rank
Summer Olympics
2000	Sydney, Australia	69 kg										10
2004	Athens, Italy	69 kg										DNF
World Championships
2007	Chiang Mai, Thailand	69 kg	~~138~~	~~138~~	~~138~~	---	---	---	---	---	0	---
2002	Warsaw, Poland	69 kg	147.5	~~152.5~~	152.5	3rd place, bronze medalist(s)	~~180~~	~~180~~	182.5	5	335	3rd place, bronze medalist(s)
