= Velichko Cholakov =

Bulgarian weightlifter (1982–2017)

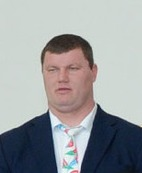

Personal information
- Born: 12 January 1982 Smolyan, Bulgaria
- Died: 20 August 2017 (aged 35) Smolyan, Bulgaria
- Height: 1.98 m (6 ft 6 in)
- Weight: 170 kg (375 lb)

Sport
- Country: Bulgaria
- Sport: Weightlifting
- Event: +105 kg
Medal record
Representing Bulgaria
Men's Weightlifting
Olympic Games
Bronze medal – third place	2004 Athens	+ 105 kg
World Championships
Silver medal – second place	2003 Vancouver	+ 105 kg
European Championships
Gold medal – first place	2004 Kyiv	+ 105 kg
Silver medal – second place	2006 Władysławowo	+ 105 kg
- Updated on 26 July 2012

Velichko Cholakov (Bulgarian: Величко Чолаков, 12 January 1982 – 20 August 2017) was a Bulgarian weightlifter.

== Career ==
He competed in the over 105 kg class at the 2004 Summer Olympics in Athens, his first Olympics, winning an Olympic bronze medal. After missing two clean and jerk attempts at 245 kg, he managed to lift a total of 447.5 kg, placing him behind Latvia's Viktors Ščerbatihs and Iran's Hossein Reza Zadeh.

Velichko won the European weightlifting title in Kyiv, Ukraine in 2004, and finished second at the World championship in Vancouver in 2003. In 2002, he won gold medals at both the European and World Youth Weightlifting championships.

He was once measured during competition as 2.05 meters tall, thus making lifting more difficult both in regard to distance of elevation and less than ideal limb proportions.

Cholakov tested positive for a steroid in 2008 during an out-of-competition test, along with ten other weightlifters, and therefore Bulgaria's weightlifting federation withdrew its team from the 2008 Summer Olympics in Beijing, China. Apart from Cholakov the athletes who tested positive were Ivailo Filev, Alan Tsagaev, Mehmed Fikretov, Ivan Stoitsov, Ivan Markov, Georgi Markov, Demir Demirev, Milka Maneva, Donka Mincheva and Gergana Kirilova. He was supposed to compete for Azerbaijan during the 2012 Summer Olympics, but withdrew before the 105+ kg competition due to health issues.

== Career bests ==
- Snatch: 207.5 kg in 2004 Summer Olympics.
- Clean and jerk: 245.0 kg 2004 European Weightlifting Championships.
- Total: 447.5 kg (205.0+242.5) 2003 World Weightlifting Championships.

== Death ==
Velichko Cholakov died in Smolyan on 20 August 2017, aged 35, after a recent history of heart problems.
