= Weightlifting at the 2002 Asian Games – Men's 62 kg =

Men's 62 kg at the 2002 Asian Games
- Venue: Pukyong National University Gymnasium
- Date: 2 October 2002
- Competitors: 14 from 12 nations

Medalists
gold medal	Le Maosheng	China
silver medal	Im Yong-su	North Korea
bronze medal	Cho Hyo-won	South Korea

The men's 62 kilograms event at the 2002 Asian Games took place on October 2, 2002 at Pukyong National University Gymnasium.

== Schedule ==
All times are Korea Standard Time (UTC+09:00)

Date	Time	Event
Wednesday, 2 October 2002	18:00	Group A

== Records ==
Prior to this competition, the existing world, Asian and Games records were as follows.

World Record	Snatch	Shi Zhiyong (CHN)	153.0 kg	İzmir, Turkey	28 June 2002
World Record	Clean & Jerk	Henadzi Aliashchuk (BLR)	181.0 kg	Antalya, Turkey	5 November 2001
World Record	Total	World Standard	325.0 kg	—	1 January 1998
Asian Record	Snatch	Shi Zhiyong (CHN)	153.0 kg	İzmir, Turkey	28 June 2002
Asian Record	Clean & Jerk	Le Maosheng (CHN)	180.5 kg	Athens, Greece	23 November 1999
Asian Record	Total	Shi Zhiyong (CHN)	322.5 kg	Osaka, Japan	3 May 2000
Games Record	Snatch	Le Maosheng (CHN)	140.0 kg	Bangkok, Thailand	8 December 1998
Games Record	Clean & Jerk	Le Maosheng (CHN)	165.0 kg	Bangkok, Thailand	8 December 1998
Games Record	Total	Le Maosheng (CHN)	305.0 kg	Bangkok, Thailand	8 December 1998

== Results ==
Legend

- NM — No mark

Rank	Athlete	Body weight	Snatch (kg)				Clean & Jerk (kg)				Total
Rank	Athlete	Body weight	1	2	3	Result	1	2	3	Result	Total
1st place, gold medalist(s)	Le Maosheng (CHN)	61.45	~~140.0~~	140.0	~~145.0~~	140.0	170.0	175.0	182.5	182.5	322.5
2nd place, silver medalist(s)	Im Yong-su (PRK)	61.90	~~135.0~~	135.0	~~140.0~~	135.0	165.0	~~177.5~~	~~183.0~~	165.0	300.0
3rd place, bronze medalist(s)	Cho Hyo-won (KOR)	61.85	125.0	130.0	~~132.5~~	130.0	160.0	~~165.0~~	~~165.0~~	160.0	290.0
4	Ümürbek Bazarbaýew (TKM)	61.95	~~125.0~~	125.0	~~130.0~~	125.0	150.0	157.5	~~162.5~~	157.5	282.5
5	Muneer Abdullatif Ali (QAT)	61.80	120.0	125.0	—	125.0	155.0	~~160.0~~	~~160.0~~	155.0	280.0
6	Tatsuo Hato (JPN)	61.95	117.5	122.5	~~125.0~~	122.5	147.5	152.5	~~157.5~~	152.5	275.0
7	Hamidul Islam (BAN)	61.85	110.0	~~115.0~~	~~115.0~~	110.0	135.0	140.0	145.0	145.0	255.0
8	Roshan Nakarmi (NEP)	61.75	105.0	~~110.0~~	110.0	110.0	130.0	135.0	137.5	137.5	247.5
9	Tanveer Ahmed (PAK)	61.30	100.0	~~107.5~~	~~107.5~~	100.0	120.0	130.0	~~135.0~~	130.0	230.0
10	Hani Ali Mohammed (YEM)	60.85	~~90.0~~	90.0	95.0	95.0	115.0	120.0	125.0	125.0	220.0
—	Chom Singhnoi (THA)	61.45	127.5	132.5	~~135.0~~	132.5	~~157.5~~	~~157.5~~	—	—	NM
—	Kenji Tominaga (JPN)	61.95	~~120.0~~	~~120.0~~	120.0	120.0	~~145.0~~	~~145.0~~	~~145.0~~	—	NM
—	Tsevegdorjiin Batzayaa (MGL)	61.75	~~112.5~~	~~112.5~~	~~112.5~~	—	—	—	—	—	NM
—	Shi Zhiyong (CHN)	61.85	~~150.0~~	~~150.0~~	~~150.0~~	—	—	—	—	—	NM

== New records ==
The following records were established during the competition.

Clean & Jerk	170.0	Le Maosheng (CHN)	GR
Clean & Jerk	175.0	Le Maosheng (CHN)	GR
Clean & Jerk	182.5	Le Maosheng (CHN)	WR
Total	310.0	Le Maosheng (CHN)	GR
Total	315.0	Le Maosheng (CHN)	GR
Total	322.5	Le Maosheng (CHN)	GR
