= Alan Tsagaev =

Bulgarian weightlifter (born 1977)

Personal information
- Born: 13 September 1977 (age 48) Vladikavkaz, North Ossetia–Alania, Russia
- Height: 1.82 m (6 ft 0 in)
- Weight: 105 kg (231 lb)

Sport
- Country: Bulgaria
- Sport: Weightlifting
- Event: –105 kg
Medal record
Weightlifting
Representing Bulgaria
Olympic Games
Silver medal – second place	2000 Sydney	–105 kg
World Championships
Silver medal – second place	2002 Warsaw	–105 kg
Silver medal – second place	2007 Chiang Mai	–105 kg
European Championships
Gold medal – first place	2002 Antalya	–105 kg
Gold medal – first place	2004 Kyiv	–105 kg
Silver medal – second place	2003 Loutraki	–105 kg
- Updated on 26 July 2012

Alan Tsagaev (Bulgarian spelling of name: Алан Цагаев, born 13 September 1977) is a naturalized Bulgarian weightlifter of Ossetian origin who competed in the Men's 105 kg weight class at the 2000 Summer Olympics and won a silver medal, lifting 422.5 kg in total.

Tsagaev tested positive for a steroid in 2008, and therefore Bulgaria's weightlifting federation withdrew its team from the 2008 Summer Olympics. Eight members of the men's team and three women tested positive during out-of-competition tests conducted on 8 and 9 June. Apart from Tsagaev the athletes who tested positive were Ivailo Filev, Demir Demirev, Mehmed Fikretov, Ivan Stoitsov, Ivan Markov, Georgi Markov, Velichko Cholakov, Milka Maneva, Donka Mincheva and Gergana Kirilova.
