= Njuh Venatius =

Cameroonian weightlifter

Personal information
- Full name: Njuh Venatius
- Born: 13 April 1988 (age 38)
- Weight: 68.63 kg (151.3 lb)

Sport
- Country: Cameroon
- Sport: Weightlifting
- Team: National team
- Updated on 7 September 2016

Njuh Venatius (born 13 April 1988) is a Cameroonian male weightlifter, competing in the 69 kg category and representing Cameroon at international competitions. He competed at world championships, most recently at the 2010 World Weightlifting Championships.

== Major results ==
Year	Venue	Weight	Snatch (kg)				Clean & Jerk (kg)				Total	Rank
Year	Venue	Weight	1	2	3	Rank	1	2	3	Rank	Total	Rank
World Championships
2010	Antalya, Turkey	69 kg	120	~~125~~	~~125~~	---	155	158	~~162~~	---	0	---
