= Shi Zhiyong (weightlifter, born 1980) =

Chinese weightlifter

Personal information
- Born: 10 February 1980 (age 46) Longyan, Fujian, China
Medal record
Men's Weightlifting
Representing China
Olympic Games
Gold medal – first place	2004 Athens	-62 kg
World Championships
Gold medal – first place	2005 Doha	69 kg
Silver medal – second place	2003 Vancouver	62 kg
Silver medal – second place	2006 Santo Domingo	69 kg
Silver medal – second place	2007 Chiang Mai	69 kg
Asian Games
Silver medal – second place	2006 Doha	69 kg

Shi Zhiyong (Chinese: 石智勇; pinyin: Shí Zhìyǒng; born February 10, 1980, in Longyan, Fujian) is a Chinese weightlifter. He became Olympic Champion during the 2004 Summer Olympics. He lifted a total of 325 kg, equalising the World record at that time.

Shi participated in the men's 69 kg class at the 2005 and 2006 World Weightlifting Championships. He won gold in 2005 and silver in 2006, finishing behind Vencelas Dabaya. He snatched 150 kg and jerked an additional 177 kg for a total of 327 kg, 5 kg behind winner Dabaya.

Shi Zhiyong held the world record in the 62 kg class with 153 kg in snatch for 12 years. He also holds the world junior records in the 62 kg class with 152 kg in snatch, and with 322 kg in total.

== Major results ==
Year	Venue	Weight	Snatch (kg)				Clean & Jerk (kg)				Total	Rank
Year	Venue	Weight	1	2	3	Rank	1	2	3	Rank	Total	Rank
Olympic Games
2004	Athens, Greece	62 kg	147.5	~~152.5~~	152.5	1	167.5	172.5	~~175.0~~	1	325.0	1st place, gold medalist(s)
2008	Beijing, China	69 kg	~~152~~	152	~~157~~	3	—	—	—	—	—	—
World Championships
1999	Athens, Greece	62 kg	~~147.5~~	147.5	~~152.5~~	1st place, gold medalist(s)	167.5	~~172.5~~	~~172.5~~	7	315.0	4
2003	Vancouver, Canada	62 kg	147.5	~~152.5~~	~~152.5~~	2nd place, silver medalist(s)	~~170.0~~	170.0	~~177.0~~	2nd place, silver medalist(s)	317.5	2nd place, silver medalist(s)
2005	Doha, Qatar	69 kg	152	157	160	1st place, gold medalist(s)	180	185	190	1st place, gold medalist(s)	350	1st place, gold medalist(s)
2006	Santo Domingo, Dominican Republic	69 kg	145	~~150~~	150	1st place, gold medalist(s)	172	177	~~182~~	3rd place, bronze medalist(s)	327	2nd place, silver medalist(s)
2007	Chiang Mai, Thailand	69 kg	153	~~158~~	158	1st place, gold medalist(s)	180	~~185~~	~~185~~	5	338	2nd place, silver medalist(s)
Asian Games
2002	Busan, South Korea	62 kg	~~150.0~~	~~150.0~~	~~150.0~~	—	—	—	—	—	—	—
2006	Doha, Qatar	69 kg	145	150	155	1	~~175~~	175	180	2	335	2nd place, silver medalist(s)
