= Im Yong-su =

North Korean weightlifter (born 1980)

Personal information
- Nationality: North Korea
- Born: 9 February 1980 (age 46)
- Height: 1.57 m (5 ft 2 in)
- Weight: 62 kg (137 lb)

Sport
- Sport: Weightlifting
- Event: 62 kg
Medal record
Men's weightlifting
Representing North Korea
Asian Games
| Silver medal – second place | 2002 Busan | 62 kg |
| Bronze medal – third place | 2006 Doha | 62 kg |
World Championships
| Gold medal – first place | 2002 Warsaw | 62 kg |
| Silver medal – second place | 2007 Chiang Mai | 62 kg |

Korean name
- Hangul: 임용수
- RR: Im Yongsu
- MR: Im Yongsu

Im Yong-su (Korean: 임용수; born February 9, 1980) is a North Korean weightlifter. He won a gold medal in the men's 62 kg division at the 2002 World Weightlifting Championships in Warsaw, Poland, with a total of 315.0 kilograms. He also captured two silver medals at the Asian Games (2002 in Busan, South Korea, and 2006 in Doha, Qatar). Im competed for the same division at the 2000 Summer Olympics in Sydney, and at the 2004 Summer Olympics in Athens, but he neither completed the event, nor claimed an Olympic medal.

Eight years after competing in his first Olympics, Im qualified for the third time in the men's featherweight category (62 kg), as a 28-year-old, at the 2008 Summer Olympics in Beijing, by placing second from the 2007 World Weightlifting Championships in Chiang Mai, Thailand. Im, however, did not finish the event, as he successfully lifted 138 kg in the single-motion snatch, but failed to hoist 168 kg in the two-part, shoulder-to-overhead clean and jerk.
