= Marco Dumberry =

Canadian weightlifter

Personal information
- Full name: Marco Dumberry
- Born: 22 February 1982 (age 44)
- Weight: 68.51 kg (151.0 lb)

Sport
- Country: Canada
- Sport: Weightlifting
- Weight class: 69 kg
- Team: National team
- Updated on 13 September 2016

Marco Dumberry (born 22 February 1982) is a Canadian male weightlifter, competing in the 69 kg category and representing Canada at international competitions. He competed at world championships, most recently at the 2003 World Weightlifting Championships.

== Major results ==
Year	Venue	Weight	Snatch (kg)				Clean & Jerk (kg)				Total	Rank
Year	Venue	Weight	1	2	3	Rank	1	2	3	Rank	Total	Rank
World Championships
2003	Vancouver, Canada	69 kg	117.5	122.5	125	28	145	~~150~~	~~150~~	29	270	28
