= Alexandru Dudoglo =

Moldovan weightlifter

Personal information
- Nationality: Moldova
- Born: 20 March 1989 (age 37)
- Height: 1.62 m (5 ft 4 in)
- Weight: 69 kg (152 lb)

Sport
- Sport: Weightlifting
- Event: 69 kg

Alexandru Dudoglo (born March 20, 1989) is a Moldovan weightlifter. Dudoglo represented Moldova at the 2008 Summer Olympics in Beijing, where he competed for the men's lightweight category (69 kg). Dudoglo originally placed ninth in this event, as he successfully lifted 145 kg in the single-motion snatch, and hoisted 172 kg in the two-part, shoulder-to-overhead clean and jerk, for a total of 317 kg.

On 31 August 2016, the International Olympic Committee confirmed that following a retest of samples taken at the 2008 Summer Olympics, Dudoglo had been found to have taken a banned substance and was consequently disqualified, and his results expunged.
