= Ninel Miculescu =

Romanian weightlifter (born 1985)

Medal record

Representing Romania

Men's Weightlifting

World Championships
Disqualified	2010 Antalya	69 kg

European Championships
Gold medal – first place	2010 Minsk	69 kg

Ninel Miculescu (born 15 May 1985) is a Romanian weightlifting champion. He was the European champion of the 69 kg category in 2010.

In late 2011 the International Weightlifting Federation (IWF) banned Ninel Miculescu for life, for a second doping violation.
