= Muneer Abdullatif Ali =

Qatari weightlifter (born 1978)

Personal information
- Full name: Muneer Abdullatif Ali
- Born: 4 February 1978 (age 48)
- Weight: 61.80 kg (136.2 lb)

Sport
- Country: Qatar
- Sport: Weightlifting
- Weight class: 62 kg
- Team: National team
- Updated on 2 October 2016

Muneer Abdullatif Ali (born 4 February 1978) is a Bulgarian-born Qatari male weightlifter, competing in the 62 kg category and representing Qatar at international competitions. He competed at world championships, most recently at the 1999 World Weightlifting Championships. He was born in Bulgaria, one of eight Bulgarian weightlifters recruited by the Qatar Olympic Committee for $1,000,000.

== Major results ==
Year	Venue	Weight	Snatch (kg)				Clean & Jerk (kg)				Total	Rank
Year	Venue	Weight	1	2	3	Rank	1	2	3	Rank	Total	Rank
World Championships
1999	Piraeus, Greece	62 kg	117.5	122.5	~~125~~	21	150	157.5	~~160~~	16	280	19
