= Artyom Shaloyan =

Armenian-born German weightlifter (born 1976)

Personal information
- Nationality: Germany
- Born: 31 July 1976 (age 49) Gyumri, Armenian SSR, Soviet Union
- Height: 1.67 m (5 ft 5 1/2 in)
- Weight: 69 kg (152 lb)

Sport
- Sport: Weightlifting
- Event: 69 kg
- Club: AV 03 Speyer
- Coached by: Frank Mantek

Artyom Shaloyan (born July 31, 1976) is an Armenian-born German weightlifter. He won a bronze medal for the 69 kg class at the 1995 European Weightlifting Championships in Warsaw, Poland. Shaloyan is currently a member of the weightlifting team for AV 03 Speyer, and is coached and trained by Frank Mantek.

Shaloyan represented his adopted nation Germany (he moved there in 1997 and became a citizen in 2005) at the 2008 Summer Olympics in Beijing, where he competed for the men's lightweight category (69 kg). Shaloyan placed fourteenth in this event, as he successfully lifted 135 kg in the single-motion snatch, and hoisted 165 kg in the two-part, shoulder-to-overhead clean and jerk, for a total of 300 kg.
