= Sitthisak Suphalak =

Thai weightlifter

Personal information
- Nationality: Thailand
- Born: 23 April 1984 (age 42)
- Height: 1.64 m (5 ft 4 1/2 in)
- Weight: 69 kg (152 lb)

Sport
- Sport: Weightlifting
- Event: 69 kg
Medal record
Men's weightlifting
Representing Thailand
Southeast Asian Games
Silver medal – second place	2007 Bangkok	69 kg
Afro-Asian Games
Silver medal – second place	2003 Hyderabad	69 kg

Sitthisak Suphalak (Thai: สิทธิศักดิ์ ศุภลักษณ์; born April 23, 1984) is a Thai weightlifter. He won the silver medal for the 69 kg class at the 2007 Southeast Asian Games in Bangkok, Thailand, with a total of 299 kilograms.

Suphalak represented Thailand at the 2008 Summer Olympics in Beijing, where he competed for the men's lightweight category (69 kg). Suphalak placed eighth in this event, as he successfully lifted 147 kg in the single-motion snatch, and hoisted 171 kg in the two-part, shoulder-to-overhead clean and jerk, for a total of 318 kg.
