= Lucian Maxinianu =

Romanian weightlifter

Personal information
- Nationality: Romanian
- Born: 29 October 1972 (age 52); Brăila, Romania

Sport
- Sport: Weightlifting

Lucian Maxinianu (born 29 October 1972) is a Romanian weightlifter. He competed in the men's featherweight event at the 1996 Summer Olympics.
