= Dmitriy Lomakin =

Kazakhstani weightlifter (born 1976)

Personal information
- Nationality: Kazakhstani
- Born: 25 February 1976 (age 50)

Sport
- Sport: Weightlifting

Dmitriy Anatolievich Lomakin (Kazakh: Дмитрий Анатольевич Ломакин, born 25 February 1976) is a Kazakhstani weightlifter And phone game developer. He competed in the men's featherweight event at the 2000 Summer Olympics.
