= Francis Luna-Grenier =

Canadian weightlifter (born 1987)

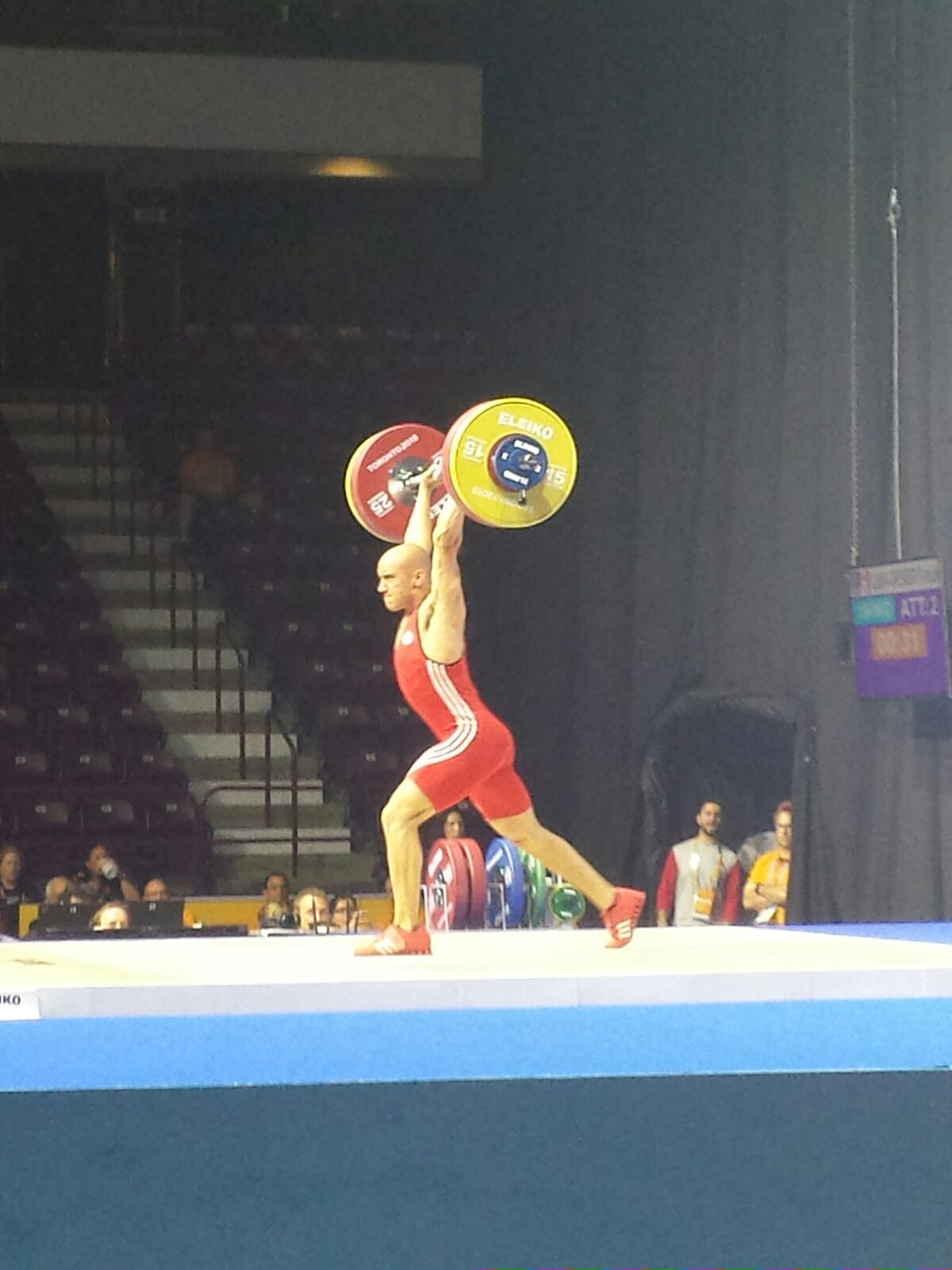
- Luna-Grenier lifts during the men's 69 kg weightlifting competition at the 2015 Pan American Games in Toronto

Personal information
- Nationality: Canada
- Born: May 12, 1987 (age 39) Montreal, Quebec, Canada
- Height: 1.70 m (5 ft 7 in)
- Weight: 69 kg (152 lb)

Sport
- Sport: Weightlifting
- Event: 69 kg
- Club: Club d'Haltérophilie de Montréal
- Coached by: Andre Kulesza (CAN)
Medal record
Pan American Games
Bronze medal – third place	2015 Toronto	– 69 kg

Francis Luna-Grenier (born May 24, 1987 in Montreal, Quebec) is a Canadian weightlifter. He qualified for the men's lightweight category at the 2008 Summer Olympics in Beijing, by finishing fourth from the Pan American Weightlifting Championships in Callao, Peru. He also achieved two top-ten finishes at the Junior World Championships in 2006 and in 2007.

Luna-Grenier started his sporting career at the age of thirteen, when he was discovered at a summer day camp by Mario Parente, a certified national Olympic weightlifter from the 1984 Summer Olympics in Los Angeles, and a coach, who quickly shaped him into an elite athlete. Two years later, Luna-Grenier became a Canadian senior national champion, and aimed to become the nation's first weightlifter to capture an Olympic gold medal, when he was featured as The Gazette's Amateur Athlete of the Week. In 2006, Luna-Grenier, however, was devastated upon the death of his coach Parente from an apparent heart attack, but had forged on with the guidance of Andre Kulesza, who administered and worked as the head coach for Club d'Haltérophilie de Montréal. Despite his former coach's sudden loss, Luna-Grenier had captured numerous sporting successes, including his seventh-place finish at the 2006 Commonwealth Games in Melbourne, Australia, and top-ten finishes from the Junior World Championships.

At the 2008 Summer Olympics, Luna-Grenier successfully lifted 131 kg in the single-motion snatch, and hoisted 172 kg more in the two-part, shoulder-to-overhead clean and jerk, to combine a total of 293 kg, finishing in seventeenth place. His sporting effort tied him with Sri Lanka's Chinthana Vidanage, who ranked atop the group for weighing seven hundredths of a kilogram less than his weight.
