= Alexandru Roșu =

Romanian weightlifter

Personal information
- Nationality: Romanian
- Born: 30 April 1987 (age 39) Constanţa, Romania
- Height: 1.73 m (5 ft 8 in)
- Weight: 69 kg (152 lb)

Sport
- Sport: Weightlifting
- Event: 69 kg
Medal record
Men's weightlifting
Representing Romania
European Championships
Bronze medal – third place	2011 Kazan	–77 kg

Alexandru Roșu (born 30 April 1987) is a Romanian weightlifter. Rosu represented Romania at the 2008 Summer Olympics in Beijing, where he competed for the men's lightweight class (69 kg). Unfortunately, Rosu did not finish the event, as he successfully lifted 136 kg (300 lb) in the single-motion snatch, but failed to hoist 165 kg (364 lb) in the two-part, shoulder-to-overhead clean and jerk.
