= Yordanis Borrero =

Cuban weightlifter (born 1978)

Personal information
- Born: January 3, 1978 (age 48)
Medal record
Men's Weightlifting
Representing Cuba
Summer Olympics
Bronze medal – third place	2008 Beijing	69 kg
Pan American Games
Gold medal – first place	2003 Santo Domingo	– 69 kg
Gold medal – first place	2007 Rio de Janeiro	– 69 kg
Central American and Caribbean Games
Gold medal – first place	2006 Cartagena	– 69 kg

Yordanis Borrero Lamouth (born January 3, 1978, in Havana, Ciudad de la Habana) is a male weightlifter from Cuba. He twice won a gold medal at the Pan American Games (2003 and 2007) for his native Caribbean country. Borrero represented Cuba at the 2008 Summer Olympics in Beijing, PR China and he won the bronze medal in the men's lightweight category (69 kg).
