= Giorgio De Luca =

Italian weightlifter (born 1984)

Personal information
- Nationality: Italy
- Born: 19 June 1984 (age 42) Palermo, Italy
- Height: 1.72 m (5 ft 7 1/2 in)
- Weight: 69 kg (152 lb)

Sport
- Sport: Weightlifting
- Event: 69 kg
- Club: Fiamme Oro
- Coached by: Sergio Mannironi

Giorgio De Luca (born 19 June 1984 in Palermo) is an Italian weightlifter. De Luca represented Italy at the 2008 Summer Olympics in Beijing, where he competed for the men's lightweight class (69 kg). Unfortunately, De Luca did not finish the event, as he successfully lifted 131 kg (289 lb) in the single-motion snatch, but failed to hoist 160 kg (353 lb) in the two-part, shoulder-to-overhead clean and jerk. He is also a member of the weightlifting team for Gruppo Sportivo Fiamme Oro, and is coached and trained by Sergio Mannironi.
