= Jafar Al-Bagir =

Saudi Arabian weightlifter (born 1982)

Personal information
- Nationality: Saudi Arabia
- Born: 15 August 1982 (age 43)
- Height: 1.67 m (5 ft 6 in)
- Weight: 69 kg (152 lb)

Sport
- Sport: Weightlifting

Jafar Al-Bagir (Arabic: جعفر الباقر; born 15 August 1982) is a Saudi Arabian weightlifter. He competed in the 2004 Summer Olympics.
