= Kim Chol-jin =

North Korean weightlifter (born 1978)

Personal information
- Nationality: North Korea
- Born: 31 October 1978 (age 47)
- Height: 1.58 m (5 ft 2 in)
- Weight: 69 kg (152 lb)

Sport
- Sport: Weightlifting
- Event: 69 kg

Korean name
- Hangul: 김철진
- RR: Gim Cheoljin
- MR: Kim Ch'ŏlchin

Kim Chol-jin (Korean: 김철진; born October 31, 1978) is a North Korean weightlifter and Merited Athlete. Kim represented North Korea at the 2008 Summer Olympics in Beijing, where he competed for the men's lightweight category (69 kg). Kim placed sixth in this event, as he successfully lifted 146 kg in the single-motion snatch, and hoisted 180 kg in the two-part, shoulder-to-overhead clean and jerk, for a total of 326 kg.

Kim was coached by Han Kyong-thae and at one time he coached Kwon Yong-gwang.
