= Mete Binay =

Turkish weightlifter (born 1985)

Personal information
- Nationality: Turkish
- Born: 19 January 1985 (age 41) Emirseyit, Tokat, Turkey
- Height: 1.72 m (5 ft 8 in)
- Weight: 69 kg (152 lb; 10.9 st)

Sport
- Country: Turkey
- Sport: Weightlifting
- Event: –69 kg
- Club: Aski Spor Kulübü
Medal record
World Championships
Gold medal – first place	2010 Antalya	–69 kg
European Championships
Bronze medal – third place	2010 Minsk	–69 kg

Mete Binay (born 19 January 1985 in Emirseyit, Tokat) is a Turkish world champion weightlifter competing in the –69 kg division.

He won the bronze medal at the 2010 European Weightlifting Championships held in Minsk, Belarus, gold medal at the 2010 World Weightlifting Championships held in Antalya, Turkey and gold medal in snatch event at the 2011 World Weightlifting Championships held in Paris, France.

On 3 July 2020 the International Olympic Committee disqualified Binay from the 2012 Olympic Games, and struck his results from the record for failing a drugs test in a re-analysis of his doping sample from 2012.

== Medals ==
World Championships

Rank	Discipline	Snatch	Clean&Jerk	Total	Place	Date
Gold	–69 kg	160.0			Antalya, Turkey	Sep 21, 2010
Gold	–69 kg			335.0	Antalya, Turkey	Sep 21, 2010
Gold	–69 kg	157.0			Paris, France	Nov 8, 2011

European Championships

Rank	Discipline	Snatch	Clean&Jerk	Total	Place	Date
Gold	–69 kg	154.0			Kazan, Russia	Apr 11-17, 2011
Silver	–69 kg	149.0			Minsk, Belarus	Apr 2-11, 2010
Bronze	–69 kg			314.0	Minsk, Belarus	Apr 2-11, 2010
