= 2003 World Weightlifting Championships =

2003 World Championships
- Host city: Vancouver, Canada
- Dates: 14–22 November
- Main venue: Convention & Exhibition Centre

The 2003 World Weightlifting Championships were held in Vancouver, British Columbia, Canada from November 14 to November 22, 2003.

== Medal summary ==
=== Men ===
Event	Gold		Silver		Bronze	
56 kg
Snatch	Wu Meijin; China	127.5 kg	Sedat Artuç; Turkey	125.0 kg	Lu Jinbi; China	125.0 kg
Clean & Jerk	Wu Meijin; China	160.0 kg	Wang Shin-yuan; Chinese Taipei	155.0 kg	Adrian Jigău; Romania	155.0 kg
Total	Wu Meijin; China	287.5 kg	Adrian Jigău; Romania	277.5 kg	Sedat Artuç; Turkey	277.5 kg
62 kg
Snatch	Halil Mutlu; Turkey	147.5 kg	Shi Zhiyong; China	147.5 kg	Le Maosheng; China	135.0 kg
Clean & Jerk	Halil Mutlu; Turkey	175.0 kg	Shi Zhiyong; China	170.0 kg	Le Maosheng; China	170.0 kg
Total	Halil Mutlu; Turkey	322.5 kg	Shi Zhiyong; China	317.5 kg	Le Maosheng; China	305.0 kg
69 kg
Snatch	Zhang Guozheng; China	152.5 kg	Arkadiusz Smółka; Poland	152.5 kg	Lee Bae-young; South Korea	150.0 kg
Clean & Jerk	Zhang Guozheng; China	192.5 kg	Lee Bae-young; South Korea	190.0 kg	Afgan Bayramov; Azerbaijan	180.0 kg
Total	Zhang Guozheng; China	345.0 kg	Lee Bae-young; South Korea	340.0 kg	Turan Mirzayev; Azerbaijan	327.5 kg
77 kg
Snatch	Li Hongli; China	162.5 kg	Vyacheslav Yershov; Russia	162.5 kg	Reyhan Arabacıoğlu; Turkey	160.0 kg
Clean & Jerk	Mohammad Ali Falahatinejad; Iran	202.5 kg	Mehmet Yılmaz; Turkey	195.0 kg	Reyhan Arabacıoğlu; Turkey	195.0 kg
Total	Mohammad Ali Falahatinejad; Iran	357.5 kg	Reyhan Arabacıoğlu; Turkey	355.0 kg	Li Hongli; China	352.5 kg
85 kg
Snatch	Sergo Chakhoyan; Australia	172.5 kg	Erdal Sunar; Turkey	172.5 kg	Aliaksandr Anishchanka; Belarus	172.5 kg
Clean & Jerk	Valeriu Calancea; Romania	215.0 kg	Yuan Aijun; China	212.5 kg	Sergo Chakhoyan; Australia	205.0 kg
Total	Valeriu Calancea; Romania	382.5 kg	Yuan Aijun; China	382.5 kg	Sergo Chakhoyan; Australia	377.5 kg
94 kg
Snatch	Milen Dobrev; Bulgaria	185.0 kg	Aleksey Petrov; Russia	185.0 kg	Pavel Harkavy; Belarus	182.5 kg
Clean & Jerk	Vadim Vacarciuc; Moldova	222.5 kg	Milen Dobrev; Bulgaria	220.0 kg	Hakan Yılmaz; Turkey	220.0 kg
Total	Milen Dobrev; Bulgaria	405.0 kg	Hakan Yılmaz; Turkey	400.0 kg	Vadim Vacarciuc; Moldova	400.0 kg
105 kg
Snatch	Vladimir Smorchkov; Russia	195.0 kg	Said Saif Asaad; Qatar	195.0 kg	Denys Hotfrid; Ukraine	192.5 kg
Clean & Jerk	Alan Tsagaev; Bulgaria	235.0 kg	Bünyamin Sudaş; Turkey	230.0 kg	Gleb Pisarevskiy; Russia	227.5 kg
Total	Said Saif Asaad; Qatar	422.5 kg	Vladimir Smorchkov; Russia	417.5 kg	Bünyamin Sudaş; Turkey	415.0 kg
+105 kg
Snatch	Jaber Saeed Salem; Qatar	210.0 kg	Hossein Rezazadeh; Iran	207.5 kg	Evgeny Chigishev; Russia	205.0 kg
Clean & Jerk	Hossein Rezazadeh; Iran	250.0 kg	Viktors Ščerbatihs; Latvia	245.0 kg	Velichko Cholakov; Bulgaria	242.5 kg
Total	Hossein Rezazadeh; Iran	457.5 kg	Velichko Cholakov; Bulgaria	447.5 kg	Viktors Ščerbatihs; Latvia	445.0 kg

=== Women ===
Event	Gold		Silver		Bronze	
48 kg
Snatch	Wang Mingjuan; China	90.0 kg	Izabela Dragneva; Bulgaria	85.0 kg	Nurcan Taylan; Turkey	85.0 kg
Clean & Jerk	Wang Mingjuan; China	110.0 kg	Aree Wiratthaworn; Thailand	107.5 kg	Rosmainar; Indonesia	105.0 kg
Total	Wang Mingjuan; China	200.0 kg	Aree Wiratthaworn; Thailand	190.0 kg	Nurcan Taylan; Turkey	187.5 kg
53 kg
Snatch	Udomporn Polsak; Thailand	100.0 kg	Junpim Kuntatean; Thailand	97.5 kg	Ri Song-hui; North Korea	95.0 kg
Clean & Jerk	Ri Song-hui; North Korea	127.5 kg	Udomporn Polsak; Thailand	122.5 kg	Junpim Kuntatean; Thailand	120.0 kg
Total	Udomporn Polsak; Thailand	222.5 kg	Ri Song-hui; North Korea	222.5 kg	Junpim Kuntatean; Thailand	217.5 kg
58 kg
Snatch	Sun Caiyan; China	100.0 kg	Patmawati Abdul Hamid; Indonesia	97.5 kg	Alexandra Escobar; Ecuador	92.5 kg
Clean & Jerk	Sun Caiyan; China	125.0 kg	Patmawati Abdul Hamid; Indonesia	120.0 kg	Maryse Turcotte; Canada	120.0 kg
Total	Sun Caiyan; China	225.0 kg	Patmawati Abdul Hamid; Indonesia	217.5 kg	Aylin Daşdelen; Turkey	210.0 kg
63 kg
Snatch	Hanna Batsiushka; Belarus	113.5 kg WR	Nataliya Skakun; Ukraine	110.0 kg	Liu Xia; China	107.5 kg
Clean & Jerk	Nataliya Skakun; Ukraine	138.0 kg WR	Liu Xia; China	137.5 kg	Xiong Meiying; China	135.0 kg
Total	Nataliya Skakun; Ukraine	247.5 kg	Liu Xia; China	245.0 kg	Hanna Batsiushka; Belarus	240.0 kg
69 kg
Snatch	Liu Chunhong; China	120.0 kg WR	Valentina Popova; Russia	117.5 kg	Eszter Krutzler; Hungary	117.5 kg
Clean & Jerk	Liu Chunhong; China	150.0 kg WR	Eszter Krutzler; Hungary	145.0 kg	Valentina Popova; Russia	140.0 kg
Total	Liu Chunhong; China	270.0 kg WR	Eszter Krutzler; Hungary	262.5 kg	Valentina Popova; Russia	257.5 kg
75 kg
Snatch	Nahla Ramadan; Egypt	117.5 kg	Şule Şahbaz; Turkey	115.0 kg	Rumyana Petkova; Bulgaria	112.5 kg
Clean & Jerk	Nahla Ramadan; Egypt	145.0 kg	Slaveyka Ruzhinska; Bulgaria	140.0 kg	Nadiya Shamanska; Ukraine	135.0 kg
Total	Nahla Ramadan; Egypt	262.5 kg	Slaveyka Ruzhinska; Bulgaria	252.5 kg	Şule Şahbaz; Turkey	242.5 kg
+75 kg
Snatch	Ding Meiyuan; China	137.5 kg WR	Albina Khomich; Russia	130.0 kg	Olha Korobka; Ukraine	125.0 kg
Clean & Jerk	Ding Meiyuan; China	162.5 kg	Albina Khomich; Russia	160.0 kg	Jang Mi-ran; South Korea	157.5 kg
Total	Ding Meiyuan; China	300.0 kg	Albina Khomich; Russia	290.0 kg	Olha Korobka; Ukraine	277.5 kg

== Medal table ==
Ranking by Big (Total result) medals

Rank	Nation	Gold	Silver	Bronze	Total
1	China	6	3	2	11
2	Iran	2	0	0	2
3	Turkey	1	2	5	8
4	Bulgaria	1	2	0	3
5	Thailand	1	1	1	3
6	Romania	1	1	0	2
7	Ukraine	1	0	1	2
8	Egypt	1	0	0	1
8	Qatar	1	0	0	1
10	Russia	0	2	1	3
11	Hungary	0	1	0	1
11	Indonesia	0	1	0	1
11	North Korea	0	1	0	1
11	South Korea	0	1	0	1
15	Australia	0	0	1	1
15	Azerbaijan	0	0	1	1
15	Belarus	0	0	1	1
15	Latvia	0	0	1	1
15	Moldova	0	0	1	1
Totals (19 entries)		15	15	15	45

Ranking by all medals: Big (Total result) and Small (Snatch and Clean & Jerk)

Rank	Nation	Gold	Silver	Bronze	Total
1	China	19	7	7	33
2	Iran	4	1	0	5
3	Turkey	3	7	9	19
4	Bulgaria	3	5	2	10
5	Egypt	3	0	0	3
6	Thailand	2	4	2	8
7	Ukraine	2	1	4	7
8	Romania	2	1	1	4
9	Qatar	2	1	0	3
10	Russia	1	7	4	12
11	North Korea	1	1	1	3
12	Belarus	1	0	3	4
13	Australia	1	0	2	3
14	Moldova	1	0	1	2
15	Indonesia	0	3	1	4
16	South Korea	0	2	2	4
17	Hungary	0	2	1	3
18	Latvia	0	1	1	2
19	Chinese Taipei	0	1	0	1
19	Poland	0	1	0	1
21	Azerbaijan	0	0	2	2
22	Canada	0	0	1	1
22	Ecuador	0	0	1	1
Totals (23 entries)		45	45	45	135

== Team ranking ==
=== Men ===
Rank	Team	Points
1	China	541
2	Turkey	509
3	Russia	395
4	Bulgaria	378
5	Romania	362
6	Iran	361

=== Women ===
Rank	Team	Points
1	China	474
2	Thailand	425
3	Bulgaria	418
4	Russia	398
5	Ukraine	391
6	India	325

== Participating nations ==
505 competitors from 67 nations competed.

- Albania (4)
- Algeria (4)
- Argentina (2)
- Armenia (9)
- Australia (8)
- Austria (2)
- Azerbaijan (8)
- Belarus (15)
- Bulgaria (14)
- Cameroon (2)
- Canada (15)
- China (15)
- Chinese Taipei (12)
- Colombia (15)
- Croatia (1)
- Czech Republic (13)
- Dominican Republic (4)
- Ecuador (3)
- Egypt (13)
- El Salvador (4)
- Federated States of Micronesia (1)
- Finland (3)
- France (13)
- Germany (9)
- Great Britain (6)
- Greece (5)
- Guyana (1)
- Hong Kong (1)
- Hungary (14)
- India (9)
- Indonesia (10)
- Iran (7)
- Iraq (8)
- Ireland (1)
- Italy (15)
- Japan (15)
- Kazakhstan (13)
- Latvia (1)
- Lithuania (4)
- Mexico (7)
- Moldova (5)
- Nauru (5)
- Netherlands (1)
- Nigeria (7)
- North Korea (6)
- Papua New Guinea (1)
- Peru (2)
- Poland (15)
- Puerto Rico (4)
- Qatar (4)
- Romania (9)
- Russia (15)
- Saudi Arabia (8)
- Singapore (1)
- Slovakia (4)
- South Korea (15)
- Spain (15)
- Switzerland (2)
- Syria (4)
- Thailand (7)
- Tunisia (3)
- Turkey (15)
- Turkmenistan (4)
- Ukraine (15)
- United States (15)
- Uzbekistan (7)
- Venezuela (10)
