= Miroslav Janíček =

Slovak weightlifter

Personal information
- Nationality: Slovak
- Born: 13 May 1974 (age 50); Dolný Kubín, Czechoslovakia

Sport
- Sport: Weightlifting

Miroslav Janíček (born 13 May 1974) is a Slovak weightlifter. He competed in the men's lightweight event at the 2004 Summer Olympics.
