= Armen Ghazaryan =

Armenian weightlifter (born 1982)

Olympic medal record

Men's Weightlifting

Representing Armenia

European Championships
Bronze medal – third place	2006 Władysławowo	-69 kg

Representing Russia

World Championships
Silver medal – second place	2010 Antalya	-69 kg

Armen Ghazaryan (Armenian: Արմեն Ղազարյան, born June 19, 1982, in Spitak, Armenian SSR) is an Armenian weightlifter who later represented Russia.

Armen had a successful junior career. He won a silver medal at the 1997 under 16's Youth European Weightlifting Championships and won a gold medal at the 1998 under 16's Youth European Weightlifting Championships in La Coruna, Spain, becoming a Junior European Champion. Ghazaryan also won the bronze medal at the 1999 Junior World Championships under 56 kg category and the silver medal at the 2000 Junior World Championships under 62 kg category. Finally, Ghazaryan won the gold medal at the 2001 Junior World Championships in Thessaloniki and became a Junior World Champion.

He competed for his native country Armenia at the 2004 Summer Olympics in Athens, Greece, finishing in fourth place in the men's featherweight (62 kg) division. Though Ghazaryan lifted a total of 295 kg, the same as the bronze medalist, he took fourth place due to a personal weight difference. Ghazaryan would have won Armenia's only Olympic medal in 2004 had he won bronze.

Ghazaryan later won a bronze medal at the 2006 European Weightlifting Championships. He also came in second on the clean & jerk at the 2006 World Weightlifting Championships.

In May 2008 he became a Russian citizen and began representing Russia. He still remained close with his friends on the Armenian national weightlifting team.

He won a silver medal at the 2010 World Weightlifting Championships as a Russian weightlifter.
