= Turan Mirzayev =

Azerbaijani weightlifter (born 1979)

Personal information
- Nationality: Azerbaijan
- Born: 24 September 1979 (age 46) Lankaran, Azerbaijan SSR
- Height: 1.65 m (5 ft 5 in)
- Weight: 69 kg (152 lb)

Sport
- Sport: Weightlifting
- Event: 69 kg
Medal record
Men's weightlifting
Representing Azerbaijan
World Championships
Bronze medal – third place	2003 Vancouver	69 kg
European Championships
Bronze medal – third place	2001 Trenčín	69 kg
Silver medal – second place	2003 Loutraki	69 kg

Turan Mirzayev (Azerbaijani: Turan Mirzəyev; born September 24, 1979, in Lankaran) is an Azerbaijani weightlifter. He is a three-time Olympian and a two-time medalist for the 69 kg class at the European Weightlifting Championships (2001 in Trenčín, Slovakia, and 2003 in Loutraki, Greece).

Mirzayev made his official debut for the 2000 Summer Olympics in Sydney, where he hauled 327.5 kilograms in total for a ninth-place finish in the men's lightweight class (69 kg). Following his further successes from the European Championships, Mirzayev was considered a top medal contender for his division at the 2004 Summer Olympics in Athens. Unfortunately, he missed out his Olympic medal shot when he lifted a total of 332.5 kg in the 69 kg category, finishing only in fourth place by five kilograms short of Croatia's Nikolaj Pešalov (337.5 kg).

At the 2008 Summer Olympics in Beijing, Mirzayev competed for his third consecutive time in the men's 69 kg class, along with his fellow weightlifter Afgan Bayramov. Mirzayev placed fifth in this event, as he successfully lifted 146 kg in the single-motion snatch, and hoisted 181 kg in the two-part, shoulder-to-overhead clean and jerk, for a total of 327 kg.
