= Yoshito Shintani =

Japanese weightlifter (born 1981)

Personal information
- Nationality: Japan
- Born: 7 December 1981 (age 44) Fukui Prefecture, Japan
- Height: 1.68 m (5 ft 6 in)
- Weight: 69 kg (152 lb)

Sport
- Sport: Weightlifting
- Event: 69 kg
- Club: Kanazawa Gakuin University

Yoshito Shintani (新谷 義人, Shintani Yoshito; born December 7, 1981 in Fukui Prefecture) is a Japanese weightlifter. Shintani represented Japan at the 2008 Summer Olympics in Beijing, where he competed for the men's lightweight category (69 kg). Shintani placed tenth in this event, as he successfully lifted 135 kg in the single-motion snatch, and hoisted 175 kg in the two-part, shoulder-to-overhead clean and jerk, for a total of 310 kg.
