= Lee Bae-young =

South Korean weightlifter (born 1979)

Lee Bae-Young
Personal information
- Born: December 10, 1979 (age 46)
Medal record
Men's weightlifting
Representing South Korea
Olympic Games
Silver medal – second place	2004 Athens	– 69 kg
World Championships
Silver medal – second place	2003 Vancouver	– 69 kg
Silver medal – second place	2005 Doha	– 69 kg

- Korean name
- Hangul: 이배영
- Hanja: 李培永
- RR: I Baeyeong
- MR: I Paeyŏng

Lee Bae-Young (born December 10, 1979) is a male South Korean weightlifter.

At the 2000 Summer Olympics he ranked 7th in the 69 kg category.

He won the silver medal in the 69 kg category at the 2003 World Weightlifting Championships, after Vladislav Lukanin was tested positive for banned substances and lost his silver medal.

He competed in the 2004 Summer Olympics, and won the silver medal in the 69 kg category.

Also at the 2005 World Weightlifting Championships he won the silver medal in the 69 kg category.
