= Demir Demirev =

Bulgarian weightlifter (born 1984)

Personal information
- Born: 31 August 1984 (age 41)
Medal record
Men's weightlifting
Representing Bulgaria
World Championships Total
Bronze medal – third place	2006 Santo Domingo	– 69 kg
Bronze medal – third place	2007 Chiang Mai	– 69 kg
European Championships Total
Gold medal – first place	2005 Sofia	– 69 kg
Gold medal – first place	2006 Władysławowo	– 69 kg

Demir Demirev (Bulgarian: Демир Демирев, born 31 August 1984) is a Bulgarian weightlifter. He is of Roma ethnicity. He participated in the men's -69 kg class at the 2006 World Weightlifting Championships and won the bronze medal, finishing behind Vencelas Dabaya and Shi Zhiyong. He snatched 143 kg and clean and jerked an additional 175 kg for a total of 318 kg, 14 kg behind winner Dabaya.

At the 2007 World Weightlifting Championships he won the bronze medal in the 69 kg category with a total of 334 kg.

Demirev tested positive for a steroid in 2008 during an out-of-competition test, along with ten other weightlifters and therefore Bulgaria's weightlifting federation withdrew its team from the 2008 Summer Olympics in Beijing, China.
