= Zhang Guozheng =

Chinese weightlifter (born 1974)

Personal information
- Nationality: Chinese
- Born: September 17, 1974 (age 51) Shunchang County, Fujian
- Height: 1.63 m (5 ft 4 in)
- Weight: 72 kg (159 lb)

Sport
- Country: China
- Sport: Weightlifting
- Event: -69 kg

Achievements and titles
- Personal bests: Snatch: 160 kg (2004); Clean & Jerk: 197.5 kg (2003); Total: 352.5 kg (2003)
Medal record
Weightlifting
Representing China
Olympic Games
Gold medal – first place	2004 Athens	-69 kg
World Championships
Gold medal – first place	2007 Chiang Mai	-69 kg
Gold medal – first place	2003 Vancouver	-69 kg
Gold medal – first place	2002 Warsaw	-69 kg
Asian Games
Gold medal – first place	2006 Doha	-69 kg
Gold medal – first place	2002 Busan	-69 kg
Asian Championships
Gold medal – first place	2003 Qinhuangdao	-69 kg
Silver medal – second place	1999 Wuhan	-69 kg

Zhang Guozheng (simplified Chinese: 张国政; traditional Chinese: 張國政; pinyin: Zhāng Guózhèng; born September 14, 1974, in Shunchang, Nanping, Fujian) is a Chinese weightlifter. Zhang is a World champion, Olympic champion and World Record holder. In January, 1999, Zhang Guozheng was named a member of the National Men's weightlifting team. He ranked fourth at the Sydney Olympic Games in 2000 in the 69 kg class. On October 3, 2002, at the Busan Asian Games, Zhang Guozheng took gold in the 69 kg class with a total score of 345 kilograms. In 2004, Zhang Guozeng won the Athens Olympic Games in the 69 kg class champion. On December 3, 2006, at the 15th Asian Games, Zhang Guozheng totaled 336 kg for a gold medal with a 152 kg snatch and a 184 kg clean and jerk. Zhang retired after 2008 and now serves as the deputy head coach for the men's weightlifting team.

== Biography ==
=== Early life ===
When Zhang Guozheng was 11, his brother Zhang Guoquan felt that Guozheng lacked decipline and needed something to focus his time on. Thus he recommended weightlifting to Guozheng. He began his current career of weightlifting when he started Nanping Sport School in March 1983. On May 1, 1985, in Jianyang, Zhang Guozheng took second at the Fujian children's weightlifting competition in the 32 kg class. In September 1987, Zhang Guozheng entered Jianyang sports school under the tutelage of coach Xue Bi lin. In July 1988, at the national youth weightlifting competition, Zhang scored first for the snatch, clean and jerk, and the total in the 40 kg class. As a result, he was selected by Professor Peng Keguang from the Beijing Institute of Physical Education (now Beijing Sport University). In September 1988, the 14 year old Zhang Guozheng arrived in Beijing alone to learn weightlifting. The National Weightlifting Competition was held in Changsha at the end of 1998. Here, Zhang Guozheng won his first national championship in his weightlifting career. In January 1999, Zhang Guozheng selected by the National Men's weightlifting team.

=== Professional career ===
In March 1983, Zhang Guozheng entered the Nanping Jianyang area of Fujian province under amateur weightlifting coach Lai Zhicheng Xue Hangbi. From 1988 to 1998, Zhang Guozheng trained at Beijing Sport University. In 2000, at the Sydney Olympic Games, Zhang scored fourth place in men's 69 kg class. In 2001, Zhang Guozheng won the National Games with the highest snatch, clean and jerk, and total score in the 69 kg class. In 2002, Zhang started his tutelage under Chen Wenbin. On October 3, 2002, Zhang competed in the men's 69 kg class at the 2002 Busan Asian Games. In the snatch, Zhang Guozheng ranked second. In the clean and jerk, Zhang Guozheng has lifted 155 kg, 190 kg, and 197.5 kg. Ultimately, Zhang Guozheng won a gold medal with a total of 345. In 2003, Zhang Guozheng was transferred back to his alma mater, Beijing Sport University. On September 11, 2003, at the 2003 Asian Weightlifting Championships Men's 69 kg class competition, Zhang Guozheng broke the 69 kg world record in the clean and jerk with 197.5 kg and also won a gold medal for total score. In the snatch competition, Zhang Guozheng first attempted 155 kg with success, but failed to lift his two attempts for 160 kg. On November 16, 2003, at the 2003 World Weightlifting Championships in Canada, Zhang Guozheng won the gold medal in the 69 kg class with a total of 345 kg. On August 18, 2004, in the men's 69 kg weightlifting competition at the Athens Olympic Games, Zhang Guozheng totaled 347.5 kilograms to win the gold medal. On December 3, 2006, at the 15th Asian Games, Zhang Guozheng totaled 336 kg for a gold medal with a 152 kg snatch and a 184 kg clean and jerk. On September 19, 2007, at the 2007 World Weightlifting Championships in Thailand, Zhang obtained gold medals for the clean and jerk and total with a 192 kg clean and jerk and a total score of 347 kg. He snatched 155 kg and obtained silver in that event. On July 26, 2008, 13 days from the opening of the Beijing Olympic Games, the Chinese Olympic Committee announced the list of lifters for the 2008 Beijing Olympic Games. Zhang Guozheng was not the list and later announced his retirement. On June 27, 2009, Zhang Guozheng attended the graduation ceremony of the 2009 graduates of Beijing Sport University. For a period of time, he served as the vice president of Beijing Sport University. On January 1, 2014, Zhang Guozheng returned to the national team as the men's weightlifting deputy head coach.

=== Personal life ===
In 2001, Zhang Guozheng married his wife Gao Wenjuan. After taking gold at the Athens Olympic Games in 2004, Zhang Guozheng faced reporter cameras and shouted "wife, I love you". This demonstration of love was widely remembered by Chinese audiences. On February 22, 2011, Zhang Guozheng's wife gave birth to his daughter.
