= Vencelas Dabaya =

French weightlifter (born 1981)

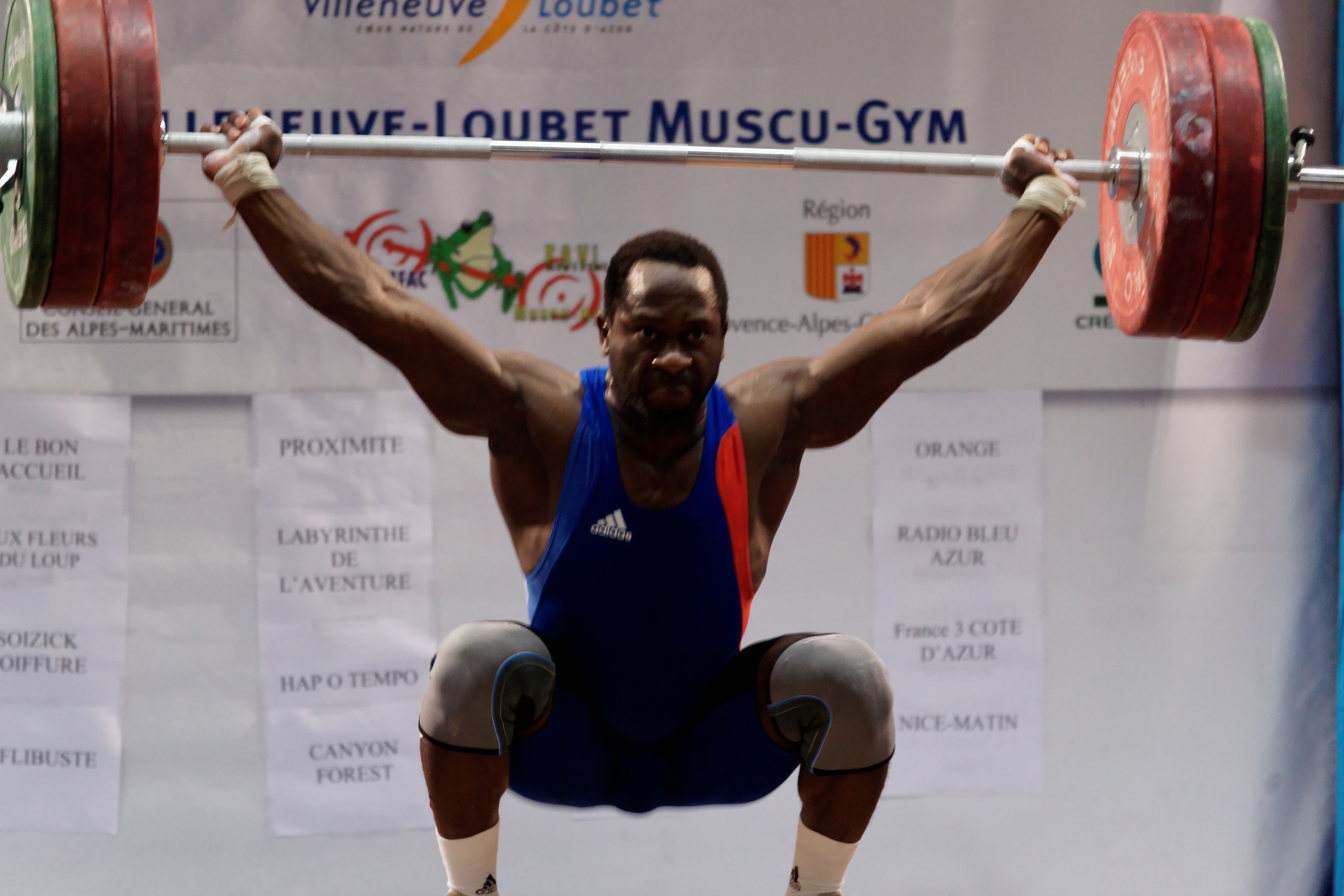

Medal record

Men's Weightlifting

Representing France

Olympic Games
Silver medal – second place	2008 Beijing	69 kg

World Championships
Gold medal – first place	2006 Santo Domingo	– 69 kg
Bronze medal – third place	2005 Doha	– 69 kg

European Championships
Gold medal – first place	2007 Strasbourg	– 69 kg
Silver medal – second place	2008 Lignano Sabbiadoro	– 69 kg
Silver medal – second place	2009 Bucharest	– 69 kg
Silver medal – second place	2012 Antalya	– 69 kg
Bronze medal – third place	2006 Władysławowo	– 69 kg

Representing Cameroon

Commonwealth Games
Gold medal – first place	2002 Manchester	– 69 kg

African Games
Bronze medal – third place	1999 Johannesburg	– 62 kg

Vencelas Dabaya Tientcheu (born 28 April 1981 in Kumba, Cameroon) is a French weightlifter. He is a former World Champion, European champion and Olympic silver medalist in weightlifting.

At the 2004 Summer Olympics he represented Cameroon, and was flag bearer of the Cameroonian team at the opening ceremony. In the Olympic tournament he ranked 5th in the 69 kg category, with a total of 327.5 kg. He represents France since he became naturalized French citizen in November 2004.

He won the bronze medal in the 69 kg category at the 2005 World Weightlifting Championships.

Dabaya participated in the men's -69 kg class at the 2006 World Weightlifting Championships and won the gold medal, snatching 146 kg and jerking an additional 186 kg for a total of 332 kg. With his gold medal, became weightlifting's 500th World Champion and received the special IWF Award for this honour.

At the 2007 World Weightlifting Championships he ranked 4th in the 69 kg category.

He won the silver medal in the 69 kg category at the 2008 European Weightlifting Championships, lifting a total of 333 kg.

At the 2008 Summer Olympics he won the silver medal in the 69 kg category, lifting a total of 338 kg.

He won gold in the clean and jerk, bronze in the snatch, and overall silver with a total of 333 kg at the 2009 European Weightlifting Championships in the 69 kg category.

He is 167 centimetres (5 ft 6 in) tall and weighs 72 kilograms (159 lb).

== Major results ==
Year	Venue	Weight	Snatch (kg)				Clean & Jerk (kg)				Total	Rank
Year	Venue	Weight	1	2	3	Rank	1	2	3	Rank	Total	Rank
Representing France
Olympic Games
2012	(United Kingdom) London, Great Britain	69 kg	~~135~~	~~135~~	~~135~~	—	—	—	—	—	—	—
2008	Beijing, China	69 kg	147	151	~~153~~	5	187	~~197~~	~~197~~	2	338	2nd place, silver medalist(s)
World Championships
2011	Paris, France	69 kg	~~138~~	138	~~142~~	20	175	~~180~~	~~180~~	14	313	13
2010	Antalya, Turkey	69 kg	~~143~~	~~143~~	~~143~~	—	~~177~~	~~177~~	~~177~~	—	—	—
2009	Goyang, South Korea	69 kg	146	149	~~152~~	5	~~185~~	~~185~~	~~185~~	—	—	—
2007	Chiang Mai, Thailand	69 kg	143	~~146~~	~~146~~	8	~~182~~	182	187	2nd place, silver medalist(s)	330	4
2006	Santo Domingo, Dominican Republic	69 kg	143	~~146~~	146	3rd place, bronze medalist(s)	178	182	186	1st place, gold medalist(s)	332	1st place, gold medalist(s)
2005	Doha, Qatar	69 kg	140	145	~~146~~	3rd place, bronze medalist(s)	179	~~185~~	~~186~~	3rd place, bronze medalist(s)	324	3rd place, bronze medalist(s)
European Championships
2012	Antalya, Turkey	69 kg	138	141	143	6	172	175	~~178~~	3rd place, bronze medalist(s)	318	2nd place, silver medalist(s)
2011	Kazan, Russia	69 kg	—	—	—	—	—	—	—	—	—	—
2009	Bucharest, Romania	69 kg	144	147	~~149~~	3rd place, bronze medalist(s)	181	~~185~~	186	1st place, gold medalist(s)	333	2nd place, silver medalist(s)
2008	Lignano Sabbiadoro, Italy	69 kg	145	~~148~~	~~148~~	4	182	185	188	1st place, gold medalist(s)	333	2nd place, silver medalist(s)
2007	Strasbourg, France	69 kg	142	146	148	2nd place, silver medalist(s)	180	183	~~190~~	1st place, gold medalist(s)	331	1st place, gold medalist(s)
2006	Władysławowo, Poland	69 kg	141	145	~~147~~	5	176	179	180	3rd place, bronze medalist(s)	325	3rd place, bronze medalist(s)
Representing Cameroon
Olympic Games
2004	Athens, Greece	69 kg	140	145	~~147.5~~	7	182.5	~~187.5~~	~~192.5~~	5	327.5	5
World Championships
2003	Vancouver, Canada	69 kg	135	~~140~~	~~140~~	21	175	180	—	4	315	13
2002	Warsaw, Poland	69 kg	~~137,5~~	137.5	142.5	10	175	~~182.5~~	~~182.5~~	11	317.5	9
2001	Antalya, Turkey	69 kg	132.5	137.5	~~140~~	12	172.5	177.5	—	6	315	12
1999	Athens, Greece	62 kg	~~110~~	112.5	115	36	~~150~~	~~150~~	~~150~~	—	—	—
Commonwealth Games
2002	(United Kingdom) Manchester, Great Britain	69 kg	135	~~140~~	140	1st place, gold medalist(s)	170	~~177.5~~	~~177.5~~	1st place, gold medalist(s)	310	(gold)
African Games
1999	Johannesburg, South Africa	62 kg	112.5	~~117.5~~	117.5	2nd place, silver medalist(s)	145	~~152.5~~	~~152.5~~	3rd place, bronze medalist(s)	262.5	(bronze)

Olympic Games
Preceded by Isaac Menyoli	Flagbearer for Cameroon; Athens 2004	Succeeded by Franck Moussima
