= Afgan Bayramov =

Azerbaijani weightlifter (born 1983)

Medal record

Men's Weightlifting

Representing Azerbaijan

European Championships
Gold medal – first place	2012 Antalya	–69 kg

Islamic Solidarity Games
Silver medal – second place	2013 Palembang	–77 kg

Afgan Bayramov (born 14 October 1983) is an Azerbaijani weightlifter. He competed for Azerbaijan at the 2008 Summer Olympics where he finished seventh and the 2012 Summer Olympics where his participation was not successful.
