= Georgi Markov (weightlifter) =

Bulgarian weightlifter (born 1978)

Personal information
- Born: 12 March 1978 (age 48) Burgas
- Height: 1.69 m (5 ft 7 in)
- Weight: 69 kg (152 lb)
Medal record
Men's Weightlifting
Representing Bulgaria
Olympic Games
Silver medal – second place	2000 Sydney	–69 kg
World Championships
Gold medal – first place	2002 Warsaw	–77 kg
European Championships
Gold medal – first place	2002 Antalya	–77 kg
Gold medal – first place	2003 Loutraki	–77 kg
Silver medal – second place	1999 La Coruña	–77 kg
Silver medal – second place	2000 Sofia	–69 kg
Bronze medal – third place	2006 Władysławowo	–77 kg
Bronze medal – third place	2008 Lignano Sabbiadoro	–85 kg

Georgi Markov (Bulgarian: Георги Марков, born 12 March 1978 in Burgas) is a retired male weightlifter from Bulgaria. He won the silver medal in the men's lightweight division (– 69 kg) at the 2000 Summer Olympics, behind compatriot Galabin Boevski. He set one world record in the lightweight snatch in 2000. He was named the BTA Best Balkan Athlete of the Year in 2002.

Markov tested positive for a steroid in 2008, and therefore Bulgaria's weightlifting federation withdrew its team from the 2008 Summer Olympics.
