= 2003 Asian Weightlifting Championships =

Asian weightlifting event

The 2003 Asian Weightlifting Championships were held in Qinhuangdao, China between September 10 and September 14, 2003. It was the 35th men's and 16th women's championship. The event was organised by the Asian Weightlifting Federation.

== Medal summary ==
=== Men ===
Event	Gold		Silver		Bronze	
56 kg
Snatch	Wu Meijin; China	130.5 kg AR	Wu Wenxiong; China	125.0 kg	Chehtae Marobi; Thailand	115.0 kg
Clean & Jerk	Wu Meijin; China	160.0 kg	Wu Wenxiong; China	152.5 kg	Ri Kyong-sok; North Korea	147.5 kg
Total	Wu Meijin; China	290.0 kg	Wu Wenxiong; China	277.5 kg	Ri Kyong-sok; North Korea	257.5 kg
62 kg
Snatch	Shi Zhiyong; China	152.5 kg	Im Yong-su; North Korea	135.0 kg	Sunarto Rasidi; Indonesia	127.5 kg
Clean & Jerk	Shi Zhiyong; China	170.0 kg	Im Yong-su; North Korea	170.0 kg	Sunarto Rasidi; Indonesia	155.0 kg
Total	Shi Zhiyong; China	322.5 kg	Im Yong-su; North Korea	305.0 kg	Sunarto Rasidi; Indonesia	282.5 kg
69 kg
Snatch	Zhang Guozheng; China	155.0 kg	Manas Alibaev; Kyrgyzstan	142.5 kg	Erwin Abdullah; Indonesia	142.5 kg
Clean & Jerk	Zhang Guozheng; China	197.5 kg WR	Erwin Abdullah; Indonesia	182.5 kg	Cho Hyo-won; South Korea	180.0 kg
Total	Zhang Guozheng; China	352.5 kg AR	Erwin Abdullah; Indonesia	325.0 kg	Kim Chol-jin; North Korea	322.5 kg
77 kg
Snatch	Li Hongli; China	165.0 kg	Gennadiy Yermakov; Kazakhstan	155.0 kg	Mohammad Ali Falahatinejad; Iran	155.0 kg
Clean & Jerk	Mohammad Ali Falahatinejad; Iran	208.0 kg AR	Li Hongli; China	200.0 kg	Ulanbek Moldodosov; Kyrgyzstan	187.5 kg
Total	Li Hongli; China	365.0 kg	Mohammad Ali Falahatinejad; Iran	362.5 kg	Ulanbek Moldodosov; Kyrgyzstan	340.0 kg
85 kg
Snatch	Yuan Aijun; China	170.0 kg	Mohammad Hossein Barkhah; Iran	155.0 kg	Shahrouz Ghorbani; Iran	150.0 kg
Clean & Jerk	Mohammad Hossein Barkhah; Iran	205.0 kg	Yuan Aijun; China	202.5 kg	Hsieh Wei-chun; Chinese Taipei	187.5 kg
Total	Yuan Aijun; China	372.5 kg	Mohammad Hossein Barkhah; Iran	360.0 kg	Akramzhan Khalmatov; Kazakhstan	332.5 kg
94 kg
Snatch	Andrey Makarov; Kazakhstan	175.0 kg	Kourosh Bagheri; Iran	170.0 kg	Asghar Ebrahimi; Iran	157.5 kg
Clean & Jerk	Kourosh Bagheri; Iran	202.5 kg	Andrey Makarov; Kazakhstan	195.0 kg	Asghar Ebrahimi; Iran	192.5 kg
Total	Kourosh Bagheri; Iran	372.5 kg	Andrey Makarov; Kazakhstan	370.0 kg	Asghar Ebrahimi; Iran	350.0 kg
105 kg
Snatch	Mohsen Beiranvand; Iran	170.0 kg	Joko Honggono; Indonesia	150.0 kg	Sunaryo; Indonesia	150.0 kg
Clean & Jerk	Mohsen Beiranvand; Iran	200.0 kg	Joko Honggono; Indonesia	185.0 kg	Sunaryo; Indonesia	185.0 kg
Total	Mohsen Beiranvand; Iran	370.0 kg	Joko Honggono; Indonesia	335.0 kg	Sunaryo; Indonesia	335.0 kg
+105 kg
Snatch	Hossein Rezazadeh; Iran	213.0 kg WR	Dmitriy Chursin; Kazakhstan	170.0 kg	Ri Chang-hyok; North Korea	150.0 kg
Clean & Jerk	Hossein Rezazadeh; Iran	250.0 kg	Dmitriy Chursin; Kazakhstan	207.5 kg	Ri Chang-hyok; North Korea	205.0 kg
Total	Hossein Rezazadeh; Iran	462.5 kg	Dmitriy Chursin; Kazakhstan	377.5 kg	Ri Chang-hyok; North Korea	355.0 kg

=== Women ===
Event	Gold		Silver		Bronze	
48 kg
Snatch	Li Zhuo; China	93.5 kg WR	Choe Un-sim; North Korea	87.5 kg	Rosmainar; Indonesia	75.0 kg
Clean & Jerk	Li Zhuo; China	116.5 kg WR	Rosmainar; Indonesia	102.5 kg	Choe Un-sim; North Korea	100.0 kg
Total	Li Zhuo; China	207.5 kg	Choe Un-sim; North Korea	187.5 kg	Rosmainar; Indonesia	177.5 kg
53 kg
Snatch	Li Xuejiu; China	92.5 kg	Supeni Wasiman; Indonesia	90.0 kg	Nandini Devi; India	87.5 kg
Clean & Jerk	Li Xuejiu; China	115.0 kg	Nandini Devi; India	112.5 kg	Supeni Wasiman; Indonesia	107.5 kg
Total	Li Xuejiu; China	207.5 kg	Nandini Devi; India	200.0 kg	Supeni Wasiman; Indonesia	197.5 kg
58 kg
Snatch	Sun Caiyan; China	105.0 kg	Prasmita Mangaraj; India	92.5 kg	Patmawati Abdul Hamid; Indonesia	90.0 kg
Clean & Jerk	Sun Caiyan; China	127.5 kg	Patmawati Abdul Hamid; Indonesia	120.0 kg	Prasmita Mangaraj; India	112.5 kg
Total	Sun Caiyan; China	232.5 kg	Patmawati Abdul Hamid; Indonesia	210.0 kg	Prasmita Mangaraj; India	205.0 kg
63 kg
Snatch	Liu Xia; China	110.0 kg	Pratima Kumari; India	97.5 kg	Tanti Pratiwi; Indonesia	95.0 kg
Clean & Jerk	Liu Xia; China	137.5 kg WR	Tanti Pratiwi; Indonesia	122.5 kg	Pratima Kumari; India	122.5 kg
Total	Liu Xia; China	247.5 kg WR	Pratima Kumari; India	220.0 kg	Tanti Pratiwi; Indonesia	217.5 kg
69 kg
Snatch	Liu Chunhong; China	117.5 kg WR	Kang Mi-suk; South Korea	100.0 kg	Irina Vlassova; Kazakhstan	95.0 kg
Clean & Jerk	Liu Chunhong; China	148.5 kg WR	Kang Yong-sil; North Korea	125.0 kg	Kang Mi-suk; South Korea	122.5 kg
Total	Liu Chunhong; China	265.0 kg WR	Kang Mi-suk; South Korea	222.5 kg	Kang Yong-sil; North Korea	220.0 kg
75 kg
Snatch	Sun Ruiping; China	115.0 kg	Lee Yeon-hwa; South Korea	100.0 kg	Lkhagvasürengiin Odgerel; Mongolia	65.0 kg
Clean & Jerk	Lee Yeon-hwa; South Korea	132.5 kg	Lkhagvasürengiin Odgerel; Mongolia	80.0 kg	None awarded	
Total	Lee Yeon-hwa; South Korea	232.5 kg	Lkhagvasürengiin Odgerel; Mongolia	145.0 kg	None awarded	
+75 kg
Snatch	Tang Gonghong; China	110.0 kg	Geeta Rani; India	100.0 kg	None awarded	
Clean & Jerk	Tang Gonghong; China	168.0 kg WR	Geeta Rani; India	120.0 kg	None awarded	
Total	Tang Gonghong; China	277.5 kg	Geeta Rani; India	220.0 kg	None awarded	

== Medal table ==
Ranking by Big (Total result) medals

Rank	Nation	Gold	Silver	Bronze	Total
1	China	11	1	0	12
2	Iran	3	2	1	6
3	South Korea	1	1	0	2
4	Indonesia	0	3	5	8
5	India	0	3	1	4
6	North Korea	0	2	4	6
7	Kazakhstan	0	2	1	3
8	Mongolia	0	1	0	1
9	Kyrgyzstan	0	0	1	1
Totals (9 entries)		15	15	13	43

Ranking by all medals: Big (Total result) and Small (Snatch and Clean & Jerk)

Rank	Nation	Gold	Silver	Bronze	Total
1	China	32	5	0	37
2	Iran	10	4	5	19
3	South Korea	2	3	2	7
4	Kazakhstan	1	6	2	9
5	Indonesia	0	10	14	24
6	India	0	8	4	12
7	North Korea	0	6	8	14
8	Mongolia	0	2	1	3
9	Kyrgyzstan	0	1	2	3
10	Chinese Taipei	0	0	1	1
10	Thailand	0	0	1	1
Totals (11 entries)		45	45	40	130

== Participating nations ==
91 athletes from 14 nations competed.

- Bangladesh (1)
- China (15)
- Chinese Taipei (4)
- India (9)
- Indonesia (12)
- Iran (8)
- Japan (3)
- Kazakhstan (8)
- Kyrgyzstan (3)
- Malaysia (4)
- Mongolia (4)
- North Korea (7)
- South Korea (6)
- Thailand (7)
