= 2003 World Weightlifting Championships – Women's 48 kg =

The 2003 World Weightlifting Championships were held in Vancouver, Canada from 14 November to 22 November. The women's 48 kilograms division was staged on 14 and 15 November 2003.

== Schedule ==
Date	Time	Event
14 November 2003	13:00	Group C
15 November 2003	15:00	Group B
15 November 2003	17:30	Group A

== Medalists ==
Event	Gold		Silver		Bronze	
Snatch	Wang Mingjuan (CHN)	90.0 kg	Izabela Dragneva (BUL)	85.0 kg	Nurcan Taylan (TUR)	85.0 kg
Clean & Jerk	Wang Mingjuan (CHN)	110.0 kg	Aree Wiratthaworn (THA)	107.5 kg	Rosmainar (INA)	105.0 kg
Total	Wang Mingjuan (CHN)	200.0 kg	Aree Wiratthaworn (THA)	190.0 kg	Nurcan Taylan (TUR)	187.5 kg

== Records ==
Prior to this competition, the existing world records were as follows.

World Record	Snatch	Li Zhuo (CHN)	93.5 kg	Qinhuangdao, China	10 September 2003
World Record	Clean & Jerk	Li Zhuo (CHN)	116.5 kg	Qinhuangdao, China	10 September 2003
World Record	Total	Wang Mingjuan (CHN)	207.5 kg	Warsaw, Poland	19 November 2002

== Results ==
Rank	Athlete	Group	Body weight	Snatch (kg)				Clean & Jerk (kg)				Total
Rank	Athlete	Group	Body weight	1	2	3	Rank	1	2	3	Rank	Total
1st place, gold medalist(s)	Wang Mingjuan (CHN)	A	47.84	85.0	~~90.0~~	90.0	1st place, gold medalist(s)	110.0	~~115.0~~	—	1st place, gold medalist(s)	200.0
2nd place, silver medalist(s)	Aree Wiratthaworn (THA)	A	47.93	75.0	80.0	82.5	4	~~102.5~~	102.5	107.5	2nd place, silver medalist(s)	190.0
3rd place, bronze medalist(s)	Nurcan Taylan (TUR)	A	47.74	85.0	~~90.0~~	~~90.0~~	3rd place, bronze medalist(s)	~~102.5~~	102.5	~~107.5~~	5	187.5
4	Izabela Dragneva (BUL)	A	47.62	~~80.0~~	80.0	85.0	2nd place, silver medalist(s)	100.0	~~105.0~~	~~105.0~~	6	185.0
5	Kunjarani Devi (IND)	A	47.40	75.0	77.5	80.0	6	97.5	102.5	~~105.0~~	4	182.5
6	Rosmainar (INA)	A	47.58	77.5	~~80.0~~	~~80.0~~	7	97.5	~~102.5~~	105.0	3rd place, bronze medalist(s)	182.5
7	Tara Cunningham (USA)	A	47.61	75.0	77.5	~~80.0~~	8	92.5	95.0	97.5	7	175.0
8	Suda Chaleephay (THA)	A	47.81	75.0	77.5	~~80.0~~	9	97.5	~~100.0~~	~~100.0~~	9	175.0
9	Choe Un-sim (PRK)	A	47.25	80.0	~~82.5~~	~~82.5~~	5	~~92.5~~	92.5	~~95.0~~	12	172.5
10	Chen Han-tung (TPE)	A	47.23	~~72.5~~	72.5	~~77.5~~	12	95.0	~~97.5~~	~~97.5~~	10	167.5
11	Svetlana Ulyanova (RUS)	B	47.53	70.0	72.5	~~75.0~~	13	90.0	95.0	~~97.5~~	11	167.5
12	Christina Baka (GRE)	A	47.60	75.0	~~80.0~~	~~80.0~~	11	92.5	~~95.0~~	~~95.0~~	14	167.5
13	Sabrina Richard (FRA)	B	47.46	~~67.5~~	67.5	70.0	18	87.5	92.5	~~95.0~~	13	162.5
14	Remigia Arcila (VEN)	B	47.62	70.0	~~72.5~~	~~72.5~~	19	90.0	92.5	~~95.0~~	15	162.5
15	Chen Wei-ling (TPE)	C	45.80	~~70.0~~	~~70.0~~	70.0	16	90.0	~~95.0~~	~~95.0~~	16	160.0
16	Rebeca Sires (ESP)	C	47.66	70.0	72.5	~~75.0~~	14	82.5	~~87.5~~	87.5	19	160.0
17	Joke Adekola (NGR)	B	47.93	65.0	70.0	72.5	15	85.0	~~90.0~~	~~90.0~~	22	157.5
18	Enga Mohamed (EGY)	B	47.62	70.0	~~72.5~~	~~72.5~~	20	~~85.0~~	85.0	~~90.0~~	20	155.0
19	Misaki Oshiro (JPN)	C	46.96	67.5	70.0	~~72.5~~	17	80.0	82.5	~~85.0~~	23	152.5
20	Jodi Wilhite (USA)	C	47.69	~~65.0~~	65.0	~~67.5~~	22	85.0	~~90.0~~	~~90.0~~	21	150.0
21	Marta Kleszczyńska (POL)	C	47.49	62.5	65.0	~~67.5~~	21	80.0	82.5	~~85.0~~	24	147.5
22	Giovanna D'Alessandro (ITA)	C	44.52	57.5	62.5	~~65.0~~	23	70.0	75.0	~~77.5~~	27	137.5
23	Petra Klimparová (CZE)	C	47.25	~~52.5~~	52.5	~~55.0~~	24	62.5	67.5	~~70.0~~	28	120.0
—	Guillermina Candelario (DOM)	B	47.04	~~67.5~~	~~67.5~~	~~67.5~~	—	85.0	~~90.0~~	90.0	17	—
—	Genny Pagliaro (ITA)	B	47.22	~~72.5~~	~~72.5~~	~~72.5~~	—	85.0	90.0	~~92.5~~	18	—
—	Gema Peris (ESP)	B	47.25	~~72.5~~	~~72.5~~	~~72.5~~	—	—	—	—	—	—
—	Dahbia Rigaud (FRA)	C	47.42	~~72.5~~	~~72.5~~	~~72.5~~	—	—	—	—	—	—
—	Ester Cichá (CZE)	C	47.51	~~52.5~~	~~52.5~~	~~52.5~~	—	62.5	65.0	67.5	29	—
—	Betsabé García (MEX)	C	47.70	~~67.5~~	~~70.0~~	~~70.0~~	—	82.5	~~87.5~~	—	25	—
—	Masumi Imaoka (JPN)	B	47.71	~~77.5~~	~~77.5~~	~~77.5~~	—	~~97.5~~	~~97.5~~	97.5	8	—
—	Silvia Lucero (ESA)	C	47.77	~~67.5~~	~~67.5~~	~~67.5~~	—	~~82.5~~	82.5	~~85.0~~	26	—
—	Ri Hyon-ok (PRK)	B	47.93	72.5	75.0	77.5	10	~~100.0~~	~~100.0~~	~~100.0~~	—	—
