= List of Russian records in Olympic weightlifting =

The following are the national records in Olympic weightlifting in Russia. Records are maintained in each weight class for the snatch lift, clean and jerk lift, and the total for both lifts by the Russian Weightlifting Federation (Федерация тяжелой атлетики России).

== Current records ==
Key to tables: Awaiting ratification Not ratified or later rescinded by Russian Weightlifting Federation

=== Men ===
Event	Record	Athlete	Date	Meet	Place	Ref
60 kg
Snatch	125 kg	Standard				
Clean & Jerk	150 kg	Standard				
Total	270 kg	Standard				
65 kg
Snatch	140 kg	Standard				
Clean & Jerk	165 kg	Standard				
Total	305 kg	Standard				
70 kg
Snatch	150 kg	Standard				
Clean & Jerk	175 kg	Standard				
Total	325 kg	Standard				
75 kg
Snatch	155 kg	Standard				
Clean & Jerk	185 kg	Standard				
Total	340 kg	Standard				
85 kg
Snatch	165 kg	Standard				
Clean & Jerk	200 kg	Standard				
Total	365 kg	Standard				
95 kg
Snatch	170 kg	Standard				
Clean & Jerk	210 kg	Standard				
Total	380 kg	Standard				
110 kg
Snatch	188 kg	Standard				
Clean & Jerk	222 kg	Standard				
Total	409 kg	Standard				
+110 kg
Snatch	201 kg	Standard				
Clean & Jerk	236 kg	Standard				
Clean & Jerk	237 kg	Daniil Vagaitsev	8 November 2026	World Championships	Ningbo, China	
Total	432 kg	Standard				

=== Women ===
Event	Record	Athlete	Date	Meet	Place	Ref
49 kg
Snatch	86 kg	Standard				
Clean & Jerk	98 kg	Standard				
Clean & Jerk	99 kg	Elizaveta Zhatkina	10 September 2026	Russian Championships	Moscow, Russia	
Total	183 kg	Standard				
53 kg
Snatch	85 kg	Standard				
Clean & Jerk	100 kg	Standard				
Clean & Jerk	101 kg	Kristina Novitskaia	29 October 2026	World Championships	Ningbo, China	
Total	185 kg	Standard				
57 kg
Snatch	95 kg	Standard				
Clean & Jerk	115 kg	Standard				
Total	210 kg	Standard				
61 kg
Snatch	95 kg	Standard				
Snatch	96 kg	Olga Te	11 September 2026	Russian Championships	Moscow, Russia	
Snatch	99 kg	Olga Te	1 November 2026	World Championships	Ningbo, China	
Clean & Jerk	115 kg	Standard				
Clean & Jerk	116 kg	Olga Te	1 November 2026	World Championships	Ningbo, China	
Total	210 kg	Standard				
Total	215 kg	Olga Te	1 November 2026	World Championships	Ningbo, China	
69 kg
Snatch	110 kg	Standard				
Clean & Jerk	130 kg	Standard				
Total	240 kg	Standard				
77 kg
Snatch	115 kg	Standard				
Clean & Jerk	134 kg	Standard				
Clean & Jerk	135 kg	Varvara Kuzminova	12 September 2026	Russian Championships	Moscow, Russia	
Clean & Jerk	138 kg	Varvara Kuzminova	5 November 2026	World Championships	Ningbo, China	
Total	246 kg	Standard				
Total	250 kg	Varvara Kuzminova	12 September 2026	Russian Championships	Moscow, Russia	
Total	253 kg	Varvara Kuzminova	5 November 2026	World Championships	Ningbo, China	
86 kg
Snatch	116 kg	Standard				
Clean & Jerk	142 kg	Standard				
Total	252 kg	Standard				
+86 kg
Snatch	115 kg	Standard				
Clean & Jerk	140 kg	Standard				
Total	255 kg	Standard				

== Historical records ==
=== Men (2018–2026) ===
Event	Record	Athlete	Date	Meet	Place	Ref
55 kg
Snatch	112 kg	Ismail Gadzhibekov	13 June 2023	Russian Championships	Novy Urengoy, Russia	
Clean & Jerk	130 kg	Standard				
Total	238 kg	Ismail Gadzhibekov	4 February 2025	Russian Cup	Verkhnyaya Pyshma, Russia	
61 kg
Snatch	128 kg	Oleg Musokhranov	13 June 2023	Russian Championships	Novy Urengoy, Russia	
Clean & Jerk	154 kg	Oleg Musokhranov	13 June 2023	Russian Championships	Novy Urengoy, Russia	
Total	282 kg	Oleg Musokhranov	13 June 2023	Russian Championships	Novy Urengoy, Russia	
67 kg
Snatch	147 kg	Zulfat Garaev	5 April 2021	European Championships	Moscow, Russia	
Clean & Jerk	170 kg	Zulfat Garaev	7 October 2020	Russian U23 Championships	Vladimir, Russia	
Clean & Jerk	170 kg	Zulfat Garaev	21 October 2019	European Junior Championships	Bucharest, Romania	
Total	315 kg	Zulfat Garaev	10 December 2021	World Championships	Tashkent, Uzbekistan	
73 kg
Snatch	156 kg	Zulfat Garaev	13 June 2024	BRICS Games	Kazan, Russia	
Clean & Jerk	180 kg	Zulfat Garaev	13 June 2024	BRICS Games	Kazan, Russia	
Total	336 kg	Zulfat Garaev	13 June 2024	BRICS Games	Kazan, Russia	
81 kg
Snatch	160 kg	Viacheslav Iarkin	7 February 2020	Russian Cup	Saint Petersburg, Russia	
Clean & Jerk	196 kg	Viacheslav Iarkin	12 December 2021	World Championships	Tashkent, Uzbekistan	
Total	356 kg	Viacheslav Iarkin	12 December 2021	World Championships	Tashkent, Uzbekistan	
89 kg
Snatch	168 kg	Roman Chepik	15 June 2023	Russian Championships	Novy Urengoy, Russia	
Clean & Jerk	206 kg	Artem Okulov	19 July 2024	Russian Championships	Novosibirsk, Russia	
Clean & Jerk	206 kg	Artem Okulov	6 November 2018	World Championships	Ashgabat, Turkmenistan	
Total	365 kg	Roman Chepik	15 June 2023	Russian Championships	Novy Urengoy, Russia	
Total	372 kg	Artem Okulov	6 November 2018	World Championships	Ashgabat, Turkmenistan	
96 kg
Snatch	174 kg	Georgii Kuptsov	14 December 2021	World Championships	Tashkent, Uzbekistan	
Clean & Jerk	211 kg	Standard				
Total	380 kg	Standard				
102 kg
Snatch	180 kg	Murat Abaev	5 June 2022	Russian U23 Championships	Syktyvkar, Russia	
Clean & Jerk	219 kg	Egor Klimonov	15 June 2024	BRICS Games	Kazan, Russia	
Total	393 kg	Georgii Kuptsov	15 June 2024	BRICS Games	Kazan, Russia	
109 kg
Snatch	188 kg	Timur Naniev	3 August 2021	Olympic Games	Tokyo, Japan	
Snatch	192 kg	Rodion Bochkov	9 April 2019	European Championships	Batumi, Georgia	
Clean & Jerk	222 kg	Timur Naniev	January 2020	World Cup	Rome, Italy	
Clean & Jerk	225 kg	Rodion Bochkov	26 September 2019	World Championships	Pattaya, Thailand	
Total	409 kg	Timur Naniev	3 August 2021	Olympic Games	Tokyo, Japan	
Total	414 kg	Rodion Bochkov	26 September 2019	World Championships	Pattaya, Thailand	
+109 kg
Snatch	201 kg	Aleksey Lovchev	17 December 2021	World Championships	Tashkent, Uzbekistan	
Clean & Jerk	235 kg	Aleksey Lovchev	12 February 2023	Russian Cup	Grozny, Russia	
Clean & Jerk	235 kg	Ruslan Albegov	10 November 2018	World Championships	Ashgabat, Turkmenistan	
Clean & Jerk	236 kg	Daniil Vagaitsev	13 August 2025	Russian Championships	Saint Petersburg, Russia	
Total	432 kg	Aleksey Lovchev	17 December 2021	World Championships	Tashkent, Uzbekistan	
Total	432 kg	Ruslan Albegov	10 November 2018	World Championships	Ashgabat, Turkmenistan	

=== Men (1998–2018) ===
Event	Record	Athlete	Date	Meet	Place	Ref
–56 kg
Snatch	120 kg	Mikhail Shevchenko	12 February 2004	Russian Championships	Novgorod, Russia	
Clean & Jerk	150 kg	Vladislav Lukanin	28 March 2000	Russian Junior Championships	Mtsensk, Russia	
Total	267 kg	Vladislav Lukanin	28 March 2000	Russian Junior Championships	Mtsensk, Russia	
–62 kg
Snatch	140 kg	Alexei Nikitin	12 February 2004	Russian Championships	Novgorod, Russia	
Clean & Jerk	167 kg	Sergey Petrosyan	16 April 2008	European Championships	Lignano Sabbiadoro, Italy	
Total	302 kg	Sergey Petrosyan	16 April 2008	European Championships	Lignano Sabbiadoro, Italy	
–69 kg
Snatch	160 kg	Oleg Chen	23 October 2013	World Championships	Wrocław, Poland	
Clean & Jerk	192 kg	Vladislav Lukanin	31 January 2003	Russian Cup	Nevinnomyssk, Russia	
Total	344 kg	Oleg Chen	23 November 2015	World Championships	Houston, United States	
–77 kg
Snatch	177 kg	Oleg Perepetchenov	8 August 2002	Russian Championships	Kursk, Russia	
Clean & Jerk	212 kg	Oleg Perepetchenov	7 July 2006	Russian Championships	Nevinnomyssk, Russia	
Total	385 kg	Oleg Perepetchenov	23 December 2000	Russian Championships	Lipetsk, Russia	
–85 kg
Snatch	180 kg	Vyacheslav Yershov	9 August 2002	Russian Championships	Kursk, Russia	
Clean & Jerk	215 kg	Aleksey Yufkin	11 April 2011	European Championships	Kazan, Russia	
Total	391 kg	Artem Okulov	25 November 2015	World Championships	Houston, United States	
–94 kg
Snatch	187 kg	Alexei Kosov	1 August 2015	Russian Championships	Stary Oskol, Russia	
Clean & Jerk	226 kg	Vasiliy Polovnikov	22 August 2009	Russian Championships	Nalchik, Russia	
Total	411 kg	Alexander Ivanov	28 May 2012	Russian Championships	Saransk, Russia	
–105 kg
Snatch	201 kg	Dmitry Lapikov	1 December 2007	Russian Cup	Nevinnomyssk, Russia	
Clean & Jerk	242 kg	David Bedzhanyan	1 August 2015	Russian Championships	Stary Oskol, Russia	
Total	433 kg	Dmitry Lapikov	18 May 2008	Russian Championships	Saransk, Russia	
+105 kg
Snatch	213 kg	Chingiz Mogushkov	24 August 2014	Russian Championships	Grozny, Russia	
Clean & Jerk	260 kg	Andrey Chemerkin	26 September 2000	Olympic Games	Sydney, Australia	
Total	468 kg	Aleksey Lovchev	24 August 2014	Russian Championships	Grozny, Russia	

=== Women (2018–2026) ===
Event	Record	Athlete	Date	Meet	Place	Ref
45 kg
Snatch	69 kg	Nadezhda Panova	26 January 2021	Russian Cup	Stary Oskol, Russia	
Clean & Jerk	92 kg	Regina Shaidullina	7 February 2023	Russian Cup	Grozny, Russia	
Total	157 kg	Regina Shaidullina	7 February 2023	Russian Cup	Grozny, Russia	
49 kg
Snatch	86 kg	Kristina Sobol	26 January 2021	Russian Cup	Stary Oskol, Russia	
Clean & Jerk	98 kg	Elizaveta Zhatkina	17 July 2024	Russian Championships	Novosibirsk, Russia	
Total	183 kg	Kristina Sobol	26 January 2021	Russian Cup	Stary Oskol, Russia	
55 kg
Snatch	90 kg	Standard				
Clean & Jerk	112 kg	Svetlana Ershova	4 April 2021	European Championships	Moscow, Russia	
Total	200 kg	Svetlana Ershova	4 April 2021	European Championships	Moscow, Russia	
59 kg
Snatch	101 kg	Olga Te	26 August 2022	All-Russian Spartakiad	Moscow, Russia	
Clean & Jerk	118 kg	Olga Te	11 December 2021	World Championships	Tashkent, Uzbekistan	
Total	218 kg	Olga Te	11 December 2021	World Championships	Tashkent, Uzbekistan	
64 kg
Snatch	100 kg	Anastasiia Anzorova	6 April 2021	European Championships	Moscow, Russia	
Clean & Jerk	123 kg	Standard				
Total	222 kg	Anastasiia Anzorova	6 April 2021	European Championships	Moscow, Russia	
71 kg
Snatch	112 kg	Zarina Gusalova	29 January 2024	Russian Cup	Tula, Russia	
Clean & Jerk	135 kg	Zarina Gusalova	29 January 2024	Russian Cup	Tula, Russia	
Total	247 kg	Zarina Gusalova	29 January 2024	Russian Cup	Tula, Russia	
76 kg
Snatch	115 kg	Mariia Andreeva	5 June 2021	Russian Championships	Khanty-Mansiysk, Russia	
Clean & Jerk	134 kg	Iana Sotieva	8 April 2021	European Championships	Moscow, Russia	
Total	246 kg	Iana Sotieva	8 April 2021	European Championships	Moscow, Russia	
81 kg
Snatch	116 kg	Iana Sotieva	14 June 2023	Russian Championships	Novy Urengoy, Russia	
Clean & Jerk	142 kg	Daria Akhmerova	10 February 2023	Russian Cup	Grozny, Russia	
Total	252 kg	Daria Akhmerova	10 February 2023	Russian Cup	Grozny, Russia	
87 kg
Snatch	125 kg	Tatiana Kashirina	11 February 2023	Russian Cup	Grozny, Russia	
Clean & Jerk	150 kg	Tatiana Kashirina	11 February 2023	Russian Cup	Grozny, Russia	
Total	275 kg	Tatiana Kashirina	11 February 2023	Russian Cup	Grozny, Russia	
+87 kg
Snatch	143 kg	Standard				
Snatch	146 kg	Tatiana Kashirina	13 April 2019	European Championships	Batumi, Georgia	
Clean & Jerk	180 kg	Standard				
Clean & Jerk	185 kg	Tatiana Kashirina	10 November 2018	World Championships	Ashgabat, Turkmenistan	
Total	323 kg	Standard				
Total	331 kg	Tatiana Kashirina	13 April 2019	European Championships	Batumi, Georgia	

=== Women (1998–2018) ===
Event	Record	Athlete	Date	Meet	Place	Ref
–48 kg
Snatch	83 kg	Svetlana Ulyanova	9 November 2005	World Championships	Doha, Qatar	
Clean & Jerk	105 kg	Svetlana Ulyanova	9 November 2005	World Championships	Doha, Qatar	
Total	188 kg	Svetlana Ulyanova	9 November 2005	World Championships	Doha, Qatar	
–53 kg
Snatch	93 kg	Kristina Sobol	2 August 2017	Russian Championships	Cheboksary, Russia	
Clean & Jerk	113 kg	Svetlana Cheremshanova	6 April 2012	European Championships	Antalya, Turkey	
Total	201 kg	Svetlana Cheremshanova	6 April 2012	European Championships	Antalya, Turkey	
–58 kg
Snatch	108 kg	Svetlana Tsarukaeva	2 October 2006	World Championships	Santo Domingo, Dominican Republic	
Clean & Jerk	135 kg	Marina Shainova	2 May 2006	European Championships	Wladyslawowo, Poland	
Total	237 kg	Marina Shainova	2 May 2006	European Championships	Wladyslawowo, Poland	
–63 kg
Snatch	118 kg	Svetlana Tsarukaeva	28 May 2012	Russian Championships	Saransk, Russia	
Clean & Jerk	141 kg	Svetlana Shimkova	2 May 2006	European Championships	Wladyslawowo, Poland	
Total	255 kg	Svetlana Tsarukaeva	5 November 2011	World Championships	Paris, France	
–69 kg
Snatch	123 kg	Oksana Slivenko	2 October 2006	World Championships	Santo Domingo, Dominican Republic	
Clean & Jerk	157 kg	Zarema Kasayeva	9 November 2005	World Championships	Doha, Qatar	
Total	276 kg	Oksana Slivenko	17 September 2007	World Championships	Chiang Mai, Thailand	
–75 kg
Snatch	135 kg	Natalia Zabolotnaya	17 December 2011	President's Cup	Belgorod, Russia	
Clean & Jerk	164 kg	Nadezhda Yevstyukhina	1 June 2012	Russian Championships	Saransk, Russia	
Total	296 kg	Natalia Zabolotnaya	17 December 2011	President's Cup	Belgorod, Russia	
+75 kg
Snatch	155 kg	Tatiana Kashirina	16 November 2014	World Championships	Almaty, Kazakhstan	
Clean & Jerk	193 kg	Tatiana Kashirina	16 November 2014	World Championships	Almaty, Kazakhstan	
Total	348 kg	Tatiana Kashirina	16 November 2014		Almaty, Kazakhstan	
