= 1999 World Weightlifting Championships – Women's 48 kg =

The Women's Flyweight Weightlifting Event (48 kg) is the lightest women's weight class event at the weightlifting competition, limited to competitors with a maximum of 48 kilograms of body mass. The competition at the 1999 World Weightlifting Championships took place in Athens, Greece on November 21, 1999.

Each lifter performed in both the snatch and clean and jerk lifts, with the final score being the sum of the lifter's best result in each. The athlete received three attempts in each of the two lifts; the score for the lift was the heaviest weight successfully lifted.

== Medalists ==
Event	Gold		Silver		Bronze	
Snatch	Sri Indriyani (INA)	82.5 kg	Li Xuezhao (CHN)	80.0 kg	Chu Nan-mei (TPE)	80.0 kg
Clean & Jerk	Donka Mincheva (BUL)	112.5 kg	Kunjarani Devi (IND)	105.0 kg	Kaori Niyanagi (JPN)	105.0 kg
Total	Donka Mincheva (BUL)	192.5 kg	Sri Indriyani (INA)	185.0 kg	Kaori Niyanagi (JPN)	185.0 kg

== Records ==
Prior to this competition, the existing world records were as follows.

World Record	Snatch	Li Zhuo (CHN)	84.0 kg	Wuhan, China	29 August 1999
World Record	Clean & Jerk	Li Zhuo (CHN)	113.0 kg	Wuhan, China	29 August 1999
World Record	Total	Li Zhuo (CHN)	195.0 kg	Wuhan, China	29 August 1999

== Results ==
Rank	Athlete	Body weight	Snatch (kg)				Clean & Jerk (kg)				Total
Rank	Athlete	Body weight	1	2	3	Rank	1	2	3	Rank	Total
1st place, gold medalist(s)	Donka Mincheva (BUL)	47.78	80.0	~~85.0~~	~~85.0~~	5	102.5	107.5	113.5	1st place, gold medalist(s)	192.5
2nd place, silver medalist(s)	Sri Indriyani (INA)	47.47	80.0	82.5	~~85.0~~	1st place, gold medalist(s)	97.5	102.5	~~105.0~~	4	185.0
3rd place, bronze medalist(s)	Kaori Niyanagi (JPN)	47.71	75.0	~~80.0~~	80.0	4	100.0	105.0	~~107.5~~	3rd place, bronze medalist(s)	185.0
4	Li Xuezhao (CHN)	47.00	75.0	~~80.0~~	80.0	2nd place, silver medalist(s)	100.0	~~105.0~~	~~105.0~~	5	180.0
5	Kunjarani Devi (IND)	47.42	75.0	~~80.0~~	~~80.0~~	10	95.0	100.0	105.0	2nd place, silver medalist(s)	180.0
6	Kay Thi Win (MYA)	47.38	~~77.5~~	77.5	~~82.5~~	8	~~97.5~~	97.5	~~105.0~~	7	175.0
7	Raema Lisa Rumbewas (INA)	47.61	~~75.0~~	75.0	~~80.0~~	13	100.0	~~102.5~~	~~102.5~~	6	175.0
8	Chu Nan-mei (TPE)	47.69	~~80.0~~	~~80.0~~	80.0	3rd place, bronze medalist(s)	95.0	~~100.0~~	~~100.0~~	12	175.0
9	Tara Nott (USA)	47.80	75.0	77.5	~~80.0~~	9	97.5	~~102.5~~	~~102.5~~	8	175.0
10	Kyi Kyi Than (MYA)	46.92	~~77.5~~	77.5	~~82.5~~	7	95.0	~~100.0~~	~~100.0~~	9	172.5
11	Masumi Imaoka (JPN)	47.44	~~75.0~~	75.0	~~77.5~~	11	~~95.0~~	95.0	~~100.0~~	10	170.0
12	Udomporn Polsak (THA)	47.63	75.0	~~80.0~~	~~80.0~~	14	95.0	~~100.0~~	~~100.0~~	11	170.0
13	Eva Giganti (ITA)	46.67	70.0	75.0	77.5	6	87.5	~~90.0~~	90.0	13	167.5
14	Gema Peris (ESP)	47.61	70.0	72.5	75.0	12	85.0	87.5	90.0	14	165.0
15	Olena Zinovyeva (UKR)	47.76	70.0	~~75.0~~	75.0	15	90.0	~~95.0~~	~~95.0~~	16	165.0
16	Sabrina Richard (FRA)	47.60	67.5	~~70.0~~	~~70.0~~	16	~~85.0~~	85.0	~~90.0~~	18	152.5
17	Guillermina Candelario (DOM)	45.72	~~65.0~~	~~65.0~~	65.0	17	~~85.0~~	85.0	~~90.0~~	17	150.0
18	Micol Dal Nevo (ITA)	47.89	~~65.0~~	~~65.0~~	65.0	19	80.0	85.0	~~87.5~~	19	150.0
19	Wendy Santana (DOM)	47.90	62.5	~~67.5~~	~~67.5~~	22	~~82.5~~	82.5	85.0	20	147.5
20	Betsabé García (MEX)	47.73	62.5	~~65.0~~	65.0	18	80.0	~~82.5~~	~~82.5~~	23	145.0
21	Csilla Földi (HUN)	47.82	~~62.5~~	62.5	~~70.0~~	20	82.5	~~87.5~~	~~87.5~~	21	145.0
22	Blanca Fernández (ESP)	47.84	~~62.5~~	62.5	~~65.0~~	21	~~82.5~~	82.5	~~87.5~~	22	145.0
23	Kaisa Viren (FIN)	47.72	60.0	~~62.5~~	~~62.5~~	23	70.0	~~75.0~~	~~75.0~~	25	130.0
24	Lubica Valentová (SVK)	46.78	52.5	~~55.0~~	~~57.5~~	25	67.5	70.0	~~72.5~~	24	122.5
25	Susana Brandão (POR)	47.18	50.0	52.5	~~55.0~~	26	65.0	~~70.0~~	~~70.0~~	26	117.5
26	Renata Natan (ISR)	47.67	~~45.0~~	45.0	~~50.0~~	27	55.0	~~60.0~~	~~60.0~~	28	100.0
27	Eugenie van Dam (NED)	47.69	25.0	30.0	~~35.0~~	28	35.0	40.0	~~45.0~~	29	70.0
—	Maria Saari (FIN)	47.52	~~55.0~~	~~55.0~~	55.0	24	~~70.0~~	~~70.0~~	~~70.0~~	—	—
—	Sanamacha Chanu (IND)	47.73	~~75.0~~	~~75.0~~	~~75.0~~	—	90.0	~~95.0~~	~~95.0~~	15	—
—	Margarita Katz (ISR)	47.94	~~45.0~~	~~45.0~~	~~50.0~~	—	55.0	57.5	~~62.5~~	27	—
DQ	Yulenis González (COL)	47.82	60.0	~~62.5~~	62.5	—	~~80.0~~	~~80.0~~	~~80.0~~	—	—

== New records ==
Clean & Jerk	113.5 kg	Donka Mincheva (BUL)	WR
