= 2006 World Weightlifting Championships – Women's 53 kg =

The 2006 World Weightlifting Championships were held in Santo Domingo, Dominican Republic from 30 September to 7 October. The women's 53 kilograms division was staged on 1 and 2 October 2006.

== Schedule ==
Date	Time	Event
1 October 2006	20:00	Group C
2 October 2006	12:00	Group B
2 October 2006	16:00	Group A

== Medalists ==
Event	Gold		Silver		Bronze	
Snatch	Qiu Hongxia (CHN)	98 kg	Raema Lisa Rumbewas (INA)	95 kg	Suda Chaleephay (THA)	92 kg
Clean & Jerk	Qiu Hongxia (CHN)	128 kg	Suda Chaleephay (THA)	115 kg	Raema Lisa Rumbewas (INA)	115 kg
Total	Qiu Hongxia (CHN)	226 kg	Raema Lisa Rumbewas (INA)	210 kg	Suda Chaleephay (THA)	207 kg

== Records ==
Prior to this competition, the existing world records were as follows.

World Record	Snatch	Ri Song-hui (PRK)	102 kg	Busan, South Korea	1 October 2002
World Record	Clean & Jerk	Li Xuejiu (CHN)	127 kg	Warsaw, Poland	20 November 2002
World Record	Total	Yang Xia (CHN)	225 kg	Sydney, Australia	18 September 2000

== Results ==
Rank	Athlete	Group	Body weight	Snatch (kg)				Clean & Jerk (kg)				Total
Rank	Athlete	Group	Body weight	1	2	3	Rank	1	2	3	Rank	Total
1st place, gold medalist(s)	Qiu Hongxia (CHN)	A	52.52	95	98	~~103~~	1st place, gold medalist(s)	120	125	128	1st place, gold medalist(s)	226
2nd place, silver medalist(s)	Raema Lisa Rumbewas (INA)	A	52.92	~~90~~	90	95	2nd place, silver medalist(s)	~~115~~	~~115~~	115	3rd place, bronze medalist(s)	210
3rd place, bronze medalist(s)	Suda Chaleephay (THA)	A	52.11	87	92	~~95~~	3rd place, bronze medalist(s)	~~112~~	112	115	2nd place, silver medalist(s)	207
4	Yuderqui Contreras (DOM)	A	52.36	90	92	~~95~~	4	110	~~113~~	113	5	205
5	Amnuaiporn Maneewan (THA)	A	51.70	~~82~~	82	86	5	~~110~~	110	113	4	199
6	Fang Hsin-tzu (TPE)	A	52.16	81	85	~~87~~	6	105	110	~~112~~	7	195
7	Fetie Kasaj (ALB)	A	52.77	82	~~86~~	~~86~~	10	108	112	~~116~~	6	194
8	Okta Dwi Pramita (INA)	A	52.37	85	~~88~~	~~90~~	7	~~106~~	106	~~111~~	8	191
9	Rusmeris Villar (COL)	B	52.90	80	83	~~84~~	9	100	104	~~106~~	10	187
10	Ana Margot Lemos (COL)	B	52.90	79	~~82~~	~~82~~	12	100	104	106	9	185
11	Soumaya Fatnassi (TUN)	A	52.30	80	~~83~~	83	8	100	~~104~~	~~104~~	15	183
12	Melanie Roach (USA)	B	52.90	73	~~76~~	76	16	98	100	103	13	179
13	Kumie Matsumiya (JPN)	B	52.55	70	~~73~~	73	20	100	103	~~106~~	11	176
14	Inmara Henríquez (VEN)	B	52.75	73	~~77~~	~~77~~	22	98	100	103	12	176
15	Marilou Dozois-Prévost (CAN)	C	52.65	73	76	78	13	93	97	~~100~~	17	175
16	Tseng Tzu-jung (TPE)	C	52.57	72	76	80	11	90	94	~~96~~	19	174
17	Maryse Turcotte (CAN)	B	52.05	68	71	~~73~~	25	97	~~101~~	101	14	172
18	Svetlana Vinogradova (KAZ)	C	52.96	65	70	75	18	90	97	~~101~~	18	172
19	Betsi Rivas (VEN)	B	51.45	73	~~76~~	~~76~~	19	~~97~~	97	~~98~~	16	170
20	María de la Puente (ESP)	C	51.61	70	74	77	15	90	93	~~95~~	20	170
21	Claritza Francisco (DOM)	B	52.80	75	~~78~~	~~79~~	17	~~90~~	90	93	23	168
22	Virginie Lachaume (FRA)	B	52.60	73	~~76~~	~~76~~	21	93	~~95~~	~~95~~	22	166
23	Estelle Lechat (FRA)	C	52.52	69	~~72~~	72	23	89	~~93~~	93	21	165
24	Oxana Zolotaryova (KAZ)	C	52.54	65	70	72	24	85	~~90~~	90	24	162
25	Maria Pipiliaridou (GRE)	C	51.80	62	66	~~68~~	26	81	86	~~88~~	25	152
26	Nadeene Latif (AUS)	C	52.83	66	~~67~~	~~67~~	27	83	~~86~~	~~86~~	26	149
27	Saula Nascimben (ITA)	C	51.37	60	63	65	28	75	80	~~83~~	27	145
28	Enrica De Luca (ITA)	C	48.38	55	~~60~~	60	29	65	70	~~75~~	28	130
—	Nataliya Trotsenko (UKR)	B	52.85	75	78	~~80~~	14	~~90~~	~~90~~	~~90~~	—	—

== New records ==
Clean & Jerk	128 kg	Qiu Hongxia (CHN)	WR
Total	226 kg	Qiu Hongxia (CHN)	WR
