= 2005 European Weightlifting Championships – Women's 48 kg =

The Women's Flyweight (– 48 kg) Weightlifting Event is the lightest women's event at the weightlifting competition, limiting competitors to a maximum of 48 kilograms of body mass. The competition at the 2005 European Weightlifting Championships took place on 2005-04-22 in Sofia, Bulgaria.

== Results ==
Rank	Name	Body Weight	Snatch (kg)			Clean & Jerk (kg)			Total (kg)
Rank	Name	Body Weight	1	2	3	1	2	3	Total (kg)
1st place, gold medalist(s)	Svetlana Ulyanova (RUS)	47.58	75.0	77.5	~~80.0~~	95.0	97.5	100.0	177.5
2nd place, silver medalist(s)	Rebeca Sires (ESP)	47.90	~~75.0~~	77.5	80.0	95.0	~~97.5~~	~~97.5~~	175.0
3rd place, bronze medalist(s)	Donka Mincheva (BUL)	47.45	70.0	72.5	~~75.0~~	~~92.5~~	~~92.5~~	92.5	165.0
4	Genny Pagliaro (ITA)	47.86	72.5	75.0	77.5	85.0	~~90.0~~	-90.0	162.5
5	Marta Kleszczynska (POL)	47.62	67.5	70.0	~~72.5~~	87.5	90.0	~~92.5~~	160.0
6	Sibel Özkan (TUR)	47.94	~~65.0~~	65.0	70.0	87.5	~~92.5~~	~~92.5~~	157.5
7	Maria Pipiliaridou (GRE)	47.98	~~60.0~~	60.0	65.0	77.5	82.5	85.0	150.0
8	Giovanna d'Alessandro (ITA)	47.28	62.5	~~67.5~~	~~67.5~~	80.0	~~85.0~~	~~85.0~~	142.5
9	Kate Howard (GBR)	47.80	~~57.5~~	57.5	~~60.0~~	~~72.5~~	72.5	~~75.0~~	130.0
–	Gema Peris (ESP)	47.70	75.0	~~77.5~~	77.5	~~92.5~~	~~92.5~~	~~92.5~~	DNF
–	Emine Karademir (TUR)	47.96	~~72.5~~	72.5	~~77.5~~	~~90.0~~	~~90.0~~	~~90.0~~	DNF
