= 1998 World Weightlifting Championships – Women's 48 kg =

The 1998 World Weightlifting Championships were held in Lahti, Finland from November 7 to November 15. The women's competition in the flyweight (48 kg) division was staged on 10 November 1998.

== Medalists ==
Event	Gold		Silver		Bronze	
Snatch	Li Yunli (CHN)	80.0 kg	Chu Nan-mei (TPE)	77.5 kg	Tsai Huey-woan (TPE)	77.5 kg
Clean & Jerk	Li Yunli (CHN)	102.5 kg	Chu Nan-mei (TPE)	95.0 kg	Kaori Niyanagi (JPN)	95.0 kg
Total	Li Yunli (CHN)	182.5 kg	Chu Nan-mei (TPE)	172.5 kg	Tsai Huey-woan (TPE)	172.5 kg

== Records ==
Prior to this competition, the existing world records were as follows.

World Record	Snatch	Li Zhuo (CHN)	83.0 kg	Chongqing, China	16 September 1998
World Record	Clean & Jerk	Li Xuezhao (CHN)	112.5 kg	Ramat Gan, Israel	24 April 1998
World Record	Total	Li Xuezhao (CHN)	192.5 kg	Ramat Gan, Israel	24 April 1998

== Results ==
Rank	Athlete	Body weight	Snatch (kg)				Clean & Jerk (kg)				Total
Rank	Athlete	Body weight	1	2	3	Rank	1	2	3	Rank	Total
1st place, gold medalist(s)	Li Yunli (CHN)	47.25	77.5	80.0	~~83.5~~	1st place, gold medalist(s)	97.5	100.0	102.5	1st place, gold medalist(s)	182.5
2nd place, silver medalist(s)	Chu Nan-mei (TPE)	47.12	~~77.5~~	77.5	~~80.0~~	2nd place, silver medalist(s)	95.0	~~97.5~~	~~97.5~~	2nd place, silver medalist(s)	172.5
3rd place, bronze medalist(s)	Tsai Huey-woan (TPE)	47.64	75.0	77.5	~~80.0~~	3rd place, bronze medalist(s)	~~95.0~~	~~95.0~~	95.0	4	172.5
4	Masumi Imaoka (JPN)	46.29	70.0	72.5	75.0	5	85.0	90.0	92.5	6	167.5
5	Siyka Stoeva (BUL)	47.86	72.5	~~77.5~~	77.5	4	90.0	~~97.5~~	~~97.5~~	9	167.5
6	Tara Nott (USA)	47.92	~~70.0~~	70.0	72.5	7	90.0	92.5	95.0	5	167.5
7	Remigia Arcila (VEN)	47.30	70.0	72.5	75.0	6	~~90.0~~	~~90.0~~	90.0	8	165.0
8	Kaori Niyanagi (JPN)	47.55	70.0	~~75.0~~	~~75.0~~	8	95.0	~~100.0~~	~~100.0~~	3rd place, bronze medalist(s)	165.0
9	Anikó Ajkay (HUN)	47.66	~~70.0~~	~~70.0~~	70.0	9	90.0	92.5	~~95.0~~	7	162.5
10	Sabrina Richard (FRA)	46.75	~~62.5~~	62.5	67.5	10	75.0	80.0	~~82.5~~	11	147.5
11	Dahbia Rigaud (FRA)	47.03	62.5	~~67.5~~	~~67.5~~	12	80.0	85.0	~~87.5~~	10	147.5
12	Eva Giganti (ITA)	47.09	~~65.0~~	65.0	67.5	11	~~75.0~~	75.0	~~80.0~~	14	142.5
13	Karine Turcotte (CAN)	47.86	~~60.0~~	60.0	~~62.5~~	13	75.0	77.5	~~82.5~~	12	137.5
14	Janice Degia (NRU)	47.69	45.0	50.0	~~55.0~~	14	65.0	70.0	~~72.5~~	15	120.0
—	Danila Manca (ITA)	46.81	~~62.5~~	~~62.5~~	~~62.5~~	—	75.0	~~80.0~~	~~80.0~~	13	—
—	Maria Saari (FIN)	47.59	~~57.5~~	~~57.5~~	~~57.5~~	—	65.0	67.5	~~70.0~~	16	—
