= Weightlifting at the 2004 Summer Olympics – Women's 48 kg =

Weightlifting at the Olympics

Women's 48 kg at the Games of the XXVIII Olympiad
- Venue: Nikaia Olympic Weightlifting Hall
- Date: 14 August 2004
- Competitors: 15 from 14 nations

Medalists
| 1st place, gold medalist(s) | | Nurcan Taylan | Turkey |
| 2nd place, silver medalist(s) | | Li Zhuo | China |
| 3rd place, bronze medalist(s) | | Aree Wiratthaworn | Thailand |

The women's 48 kilograms weightlifting event at the 2004 Summer Olympics in Athens, Greece took place at the Nikaia Olympic Weightlifting Hall on 14 August.

Total score was the sum of the lifter's best result in each of the snatch and the clean and jerk, with three lifts allowed for each lift. In case of a tie, the lighter lifter won; if still tied, the lifter who took the fewest attempts to achieve the total score won. Lifters without a valid snatch score did not perform the clean and jerk.

== Schedule ==
All times are Eastern European Summer Time (UTC+03:00)

| Date | Time | Event |
|---|---|---|
| 14 August 2004 | 20:00 | Group A |

== Records ==
{{{caption}}}
| World Record | Snatch | Li Zhuo (CHN) | 93.5 kg | Qinhuangdao, China | 10 September 2003 |
| World Record | Clean & Jerk | Li Zhuo (CHN) | 116.5 kg | Qinhuangdao, China | 10 September 2003 |
| World Record | Total | Wang Mingjuan (CHN) | 207.5 kg | Warsaw, Poland | 18 November 2002 |
| Olympic Record | Snatch | Olympic Standard | 87.5 kg | — | 1 January 1997 |
| Olympic Record | Clean & Jerk | Olympic Standard | 112.5 kg | — | 1 January 1997 |
| Olympic Record | Total | Olympic Standard | 197.5 kg | — | 1 January 1997 |

== Results ==
| Rank | Athlete | Group | Body weight | Snatch (kg) | | | | Clean & Jerk (kg) | | | | Total |
| Rank | Athlete | Group | Body weight | 1 | 2 | 3 | Result | 1 | 2 | 3 | Result | Total |
|---|---|---|---|---|---|---|---|---|---|---|---|---|
| 1st place, gold medalist(s) | Nurcan Taylan (TUR) | A | 47.21 | 90.0 | 95.0 | 97.5 | 97.5 | 107.5 | ~~112.5~~ | 112.5 | 112.5 | 210.0 |
| 2nd place, silver medalist(s) | Li Zhuo (CHN) | A | 47.65 | 90.0 | 92.5 | ~~95.0~~ | 92.5 | 112.5 | ~~120.0~~ | ~~120.0~~ | 112.5 | 205.0 |
| 3rd place, bronze medalist(s) | Aree Wiratthaworn (THA) | A | 47.82 | 80.0 | ~~85.0~~ | 85.0 | 85.0 | 105.0 | 110.0 | 115.0 | 115.0 | 200.0 |
| 4 | Kunjarani Devi (IND) | A | 47.78 | ~~82.5~~ | 82.5 | ~~85.0~~ | 82.5 | 102.5 | 107.5 | ~~112.5~~ | 107.5 | 190.0 |
| 5 | Izabela Dragneva (BUL) | A | 47.63 | 80.0 | 82.5 | ~~85.0~~ | 82.5 | 100.0 | ~~105.0~~ | 105.0 | 105.0 | 187.5 |
| 6 | Chen Han-tung (TPE) | A | 47.62 | 80.0 | ~~82.5~~ | ~~82.5~~ | 80.0 | ~~102.5~~ | 102.5 | ~~105.0~~ | 102.5 | 182.5 |
| 7 | Blessed Udoh (NGR) | A | 47.46 | 75.0 | ~~80.0~~ | ~~80.0~~ | 75.0 | 100.0 | ~~105.0~~ | 105.0 | 105.0 | 180.0 |
| 8 | Choe Un-sim (PRK) | A | 47.33 | 82.5 | ~~85.0~~ | ~~85.0~~ | 82.5 | ~~95.0~~ | 95.0 | ~~97.5~~ | 95.0 | 177.5 |
| 9 | Hiromi Miyake (JPN) | A | 47.38 | 72.5 | ~~77.5~~ | 77.5 | 77.5 | 97.5 | ~~102.5~~ | ~~102.5~~ | 97.5 | 175.0 |
| 10 | Tara Cunningham (USA) | A | 47.40 | 77.5 | ~~80.0~~ | ~~80.0~~ | 77.5 | 90.0 | ~~95.0~~ | 95.0 | 95.0 | 172.5 |
| 11 | Chen Wei-ling (TPE) | A | 47.01 | 72.5 | ~~75.0~~ | 75.0 | 75.0 | 95.0 | ~~102.5~~ | ~~102.5~~ | 95.0 | 170.0 |
| 12 | Gema Peris (ESP) | A | 47.46 | 77.5 | ~~80.0~~ | ~~80.0~~ | 77.5 | 90.0 | ~~92.5~~ | ~~92.5~~ | 90.0 | 167.5 |
| 13 | Enga Mohamed (EGY) | A | 47.74 | 72.5 | ~~75.0~~ | 75.0 | 75.0 | 90.0 | ~~95.0~~ | ~~95.0~~ | 90.0 | 165.0 |
| — | Rosmainar (INA) | A | 47.87 | ~~80.0~~ | ~~80.0~~ | ~~80.0~~ | — | — | — | — | — | — |
| DQ | Nan Aye Khine (MYA) | A | 47.48 | ~~82.5~~ | 82.5 | ~~85.0~~ | 82.5 | ~~107.5~~ | 107.5 | ~~112.5~~ | 107.5 | ~~190.0~~ |

- Nan Aye Khine of Myanmar originally finished fourth, but was disqualified after she tested positive for a steroid.

== New records ==
| Snatch | 90.0 kg | Nurcan Taylan (TUR) | OR |
| Snatch | 92.5 kg | Li Zhuo (CHN) | OR |
| Snatch | 95.0 kg | Nurcan Taylan (TUR) | WR |
| Snatch | 97.5 kg | Nurcan Taylan (TUR) | WR |
| Clean & Jerk | 115.0 kg | Aree Wiratthaworn (THA) | OR |
| Total | 205.0 kg | Nurcan Taylan (TUR) | OR |
| Total | 210.0 kg | Nurcan Taylan (TUR) | WR |
