= 2002 World Weightlifting Championships – Women's 48 kg =

The 2002 World Weightlifting Championships were held in Warsaw, Poland from 19 November to 26 November. The women's 48 kilograms division was staged on 19 November 2002.

== Schedule ==
Date	Time	Event
19 November 2002	12:00	Group B
19 November 2002	17:00	Group A

== Medalists ==
Event	Gold		Silver		Bronze	
Snatch	Wang Mingjuan (CHN)	92.5 kg	Nurcan Taylan (TUR)	87.5 kg	Izabela Dragneva (BUL)	82.5 kg
Clean & Jerk	Wang Mingjuan (CHN)	115.0 kg	Nurcan Taylan (TUR)	105.0 kg	Izabela Dragneva (BUL)	100.0 kg
Total	Wang Mingjuan (CHN)	207.5 kg	Nurcan Taylan (TUR)	192.5 kg	Izabela Dragneva (BUL)	182.5 kg

== Records ==
Prior to this competition, the existing world records were as follows.

World Record	Snatch	Wang Mingjuan (CHN)	90.0 kg	Havířov, Czech Republic	30 May 2002
World Record	Clean & Jerk	Li Zhuo (CHN)	115.0 kg	İzmir, Turkey	28 June 2002
World Record	Total	Wang Mingjuan (CHN)	200.0 kg	Havířov, Czech Republic	30 May 2002

== Results ==
Rank	Athlete	Group	Body weight	Snatch (kg)				Clean & Jerk (kg)				Total
Rank	Athlete	Group	Body weight	1	2	3	Rank	1	2	3	Rank	Total
1st place, gold medalist(s)	Wang Mingjuan (CHN)	A	47.80	87.5	90.5	92.5	1st place, gold medalist(s)	110.0	112.5	115.5	1st place, gold medalist(s)	207.5
2nd place, silver medalist(s)	Nurcan Taylan (TUR)	A	47.55	82.5	87.5	~~91.0~~	2nd place, silver medalist(s)	100.0	105.0	~~112.5~~	2nd place, silver medalist(s)	192.5
3rd place, bronze medalist(s)	Izabela Dragneva (BUL)	A	48.00	~~77.5~~	77.5	82.5	3rd place, bronze medalist(s)	97.5	~~100.0~~	100.0	3rd place, bronze medalist(s)	182.5
4	Gema Peris (ESP)	A	47.80	75.0	77.5	~~80.0~~	5	90.0	92.5	95.0	5	172.5
5	Svetlana Ulyanova (RUS)	A	47.65	~~75.0~~	~~75.0~~	75.0	6	~~92.5~~	92.5	~~95.0~~	6	167.5
6	Masumi Imaoka (JPN)	A	47.65	~~72.5~~	72.5	~~75.0~~	8	92.5	95.0	~~97.5~~	4	167.5
7	Dahbia Rigaud (FRA)	A	47.50	70.0	72.5	~~75.0~~	7	~~87.5~~	87.5	~~90.0~~	8	160.0
8	Enga Mohamed (EGY)	A	47.85	70.0	~~75.0~~	~~75.0~~	9	85.0	90.0	~~92.5~~	7	160.0
9	Karine Turcotte (CAN)	A	47.65	65.0	67.5	~~70.0~~	10	~~82.5~~	82.5	~~87.5~~	9	150.0
10	Natallia Radukhouskaya (BLR)	B	47.85	62.5	~~67.5~~	~~67.5~~	11	75.0	77.5	~~80.0~~	10	140.0
11	Renata Natan (ISR)	B	47.90	52.5	~~57.5~~	~~57.5~~	12	62.5	~~67.5~~	~~67.5~~	11	115.0
—	Chen Han-tung (TPE)	A	47.55	77.5	~~80.0~~	~~80.0~~	4	~~100.0~~	~~102.5~~	~~102.5~~	—	—

== New records ==
Snatch	90.5 kg	Wang Mingjuan (CHN)	WR
Snatch	92.5 kg	Wang Mingjuan (CHN)	WR
Clean & Jerk	115.5 kg	Wang Mingjuan (CHN)	WR
Total	202.5 kg	Wang Mingjuan (CHN)	WR
Total	205.0 kg	Wang Mingjuan (CHN)	WR
Total	207.5 kg	Wang Mingjuan (CHN)	WR
