= 1996 World Weightlifting Championships – Women's 46 kg =

The 1996 World Weightlifting Championships were held in Warsaw, Poland from 3 May to 11 May. The women's competition in the 46 kilograms division was staged on 3 May.

== Medalists ==
| Event | Gold | | Silver | | Bronze | |
|---|---|---|---|---|---|---|
| Snatch | Guan Hong (CHN) | 77.5 kg | Tsai Huey-woan (TPE) | 70.0 kg | Kunjarani Devi (IND) | 67.5 kg |
| Clean & Jerk | Guan Hong (CHN) | 95.0 kg | Kunjarani Devi (IND) | 90.0 kg | Tsai Huey-woan (TPE) | 87.5 kg |
| Total | Guan Hong (CHN) | 172.5 kg | Kunjarani Devi (IND) | 157.5 kg | Tsai Huey-woan (TPE) | 157.5 kg |

== Records ==
Prior to this competition, the existing world records were as follows.

| World record | Snatch | Guan Hong (CHN) | 81.0 kg | Guangzhou, China | 17 November 1995 |
| World record | Clean & Jerk | Guan Hong (CHN) | 105.0 kg | Yachiyo, Japan | 8 July 1997 |
| World record | Total | Guan Hong (CHN) | 185.0 kg | Yachiyo, Japan | 4 April 1996 |

== Results ==
| Rank | Athlete | Body weight | Snatch (kg) | | | | Clean & Jerk (kg) | | | | Total |
| Rank | Athlete | Body weight | 1 | 2 | 3 | Rank | 1 | 2 | 3 | Rank | Total |
|---|---|---|---|---|---|---|---|---|---|---|---|
| 1st place, gold medalist(s) | Guan Hong (CHN) | 44.75 | 72.5 | ~~77.5~~ | 77.5 | 1st place, gold medalist(s) | 95.0 | ~~105.5~~ | ~~105.5~~ | 1st place, gold medalist(s) | 172.5 |
| 2nd place, silver medalist(s) | Kunjarani Devi (IND) | 45.45 | ~~67.5~~ | ~~67.5~~ | 67.5 | 3rd place, bronze medalist(s) | 87.5 | 90.0 | ~~97.5~~ | 2nd place, silver medalist(s) | 157.5 |
| 3rd place, bronze medalist(s) | Tsai Huey-woan (TPE) | 45.60 | 67.5 | 70.0 | ~~72.5~~ | 2nd place, silver medalist(s) | 85.0 | 87.5 | ~~90.0~~ | 3rd place, bronze medalist(s) | 157.5 |
| 4 | Kaori Niyanagi (JPN) | 45.80 | 62.5 | 67.5 | ~~70.0~~ | 4 | 85.0 | ~~90.0~~ | ~~90.0~~ | 4 | 152.5 |
| 5 | Donka Mincheva (BUL) | 45.80 | 65.0 | ~~67.5~~ | 67.5 | 5 | ~~80.0~~ | 80.0 | 82.5 | 6 | 150.0 |
| 6 | Lubov Averianova (RUS) | 45.80 | 62.5 | — | — | 7 | 82.5 | — | — | 5 | 145.0 |
| 7 | Loreen Briner (USA) | 45.85 | 60.0 | 65.0 | ~~70.0~~ | 6 | 72.5 | ~~77.5~~ | ~~80.0~~ | 7 | 137.5 |
