= 2005 World Weightlifting Championships – Women's 48 kg =

The 2005 World Weightlifting Championships were held in Doha, Qatar from 9 November to 17 November. The women's 48 kilograms division was staged on 9 November 2005.

== Schedule ==
| Date | Time | Event |
|---|---|---|
| 9 November 2005 | 13:00 | Group B |
| 9 November 2005 | 17:30 | Group A |

== Medalists ==
| Event | Gold | | Silver | | Bronze | |
|---|---|---|---|---|---|---|
| Snatch | Wang Mingjuan (CHN) | 95 kg | Pensiri Saelaw (THA) | 88 kg | Aree Wiratthaworn (THA) | 85 kg |
| Clean & Jerk | Wang Mingjuan (CHN) | 118 kg | Pensiri Saelaw (THA) | 110 kg | Hiromi Miyake (JPN) | 110 kg |
| Total | Wang Mingjuan (CHN) | 213 kg | Pensiri Saelaw (THA) | 198 kg | Aree Wiratthaworn (THA) | 193 kg |

== Records ==
Prior to this competition, the existing world records were as follows.

| World record | Snatch | Nurcan Taylan (TUR) | 97 kg | Athens, Greece | 14 August 2004 |
| World record | Clean & Jerk | Yang Lian (CHN) | 117 kg | Macau | 30 October 2005 |
| World record | Total | Nurcan Taylan (TUR) | 210 kg | Athens, Greece | 14 August 2004 |

== Results ==
| Rank | Athlete | Group | Body weight | Snatch (kg) | | | | Clean & Jerk (kg) | | | | Total |
| Rank | Athlete | Group | Body weight | 1 | 2 | 3 | Rank | 1 | 2 | 3 | Rank | Total |
|---|---|---|---|---|---|---|---|---|---|---|---|---|
| 1st place, gold medalist(s) | Wang Mingjuan (CHN) | A | 47.82 | 89 | 93 | 95 | 1st place, gold medalist(s) | 112 | 116 | 118 | 1st place, gold medalist(s) | 213 |
| 2nd place, silver medalist(s) | Pensiri Saelaw (THA) | A | 47.55 | 82 | ~~85~~ | 88 | 2nd place, silver medalist(s) | 110 | ~~115~~ | ~~116~~ | 2nd place, silver medalist(s) | 198 |
| 3rd place, bronze medalist(s) | Aree Wiratthaworn (THA) | A | 47.74 | 82 | 85 | ~~88~~ | 3rd place, bronze medalist(s) | 105 | 108 | ~~110~~ | 4 | 193 |
| 4 | Hiromi Miyake (JPN) | A | 47.81 | 78 | 81 | ~~83~~ | 6 | 105 | ~~110~~ | 110 | 3rd place, bronze medalist(s) | 191 |
| 5 | Svetlana Ulyanova (RUS) | A | 47.89 | 78 | 81 | 83 | 4 | 100 | ~~105~~ | 105 | 5 | 188 |
| 6 | Estefanía Juan (ESP) | A | 47.61 | 80 | 82 | ~~84~~ | 5 | 97 | 100 | 102 | 6 | 184 |
| 7 | Kunjarani Devi (IND) | A | 47.30 | 75 | 78 | ~~79~~ | 7 | 95 | 98 | 100 | 7 | 178 |
| 8 | Chen Han-tung (TPE) | A | 47.42 | ~~75~~ | 75 | ~~78~~ | 10 | 95 | 100 | ~~105~~ | 8 | 175 |
| 9 | Izabela Dragneva (BUL) | A | 47.90 | 75 | ~~78~~ | ~~79~~ | 11 | 95 | 98 | — | 9 | 173 |
| 10 | Gema Peris (ESP) | A | 47.60 | 77 | ~~79~~ | ~~80~~ | 9 | 92 | 95 | ~~99~~ | 10 | 172 |
| 11 | Genny Pagliaro (ITA) | B | 47.59 | 72 | 75 | 78 | 8 | 87 | ~~90~~ | ~~90~~ | 13 | 165 |
| 12 | Guillermina Candelario (DOM) | B | 46.85 | ~~70~~ | 70 | ~~72~~ | 13 | ~~90~~ | 91 | 92 | 11 | 162 |
| 13 | Remigia Arcila (VEN) | B | 47.95 | 70 | ~~73~~ | ~~75~~ | 14 | 87 | 91 | 92 | 12 | 162 |
| 14 | Carolina Valencia (MEX) | B | 47.86 | ~~70~~ | ~~70~~ | 74 | 12 | ~~87~~ | 87 | ~~92~~ | 14 | 161 |
| 15 | Roxana Osorio (COL) | B | 47.49 | ~~69~~ | ~~69~~ | 69 | 15 | 80 | 85 | ~~87~~ | 15 | 154 |
| 16 | Portia Vries (RSA) | B | 47.93 | ~~62~~ | 62 | ~~66~~ | 16 | 82 | ~~85~~ | ~~85~~ | 16 | 144 |
| 17 | Tímea Kovács (HUN) | B | 47.14 | 55 | 58 | 61 | 17 | 75 | ~~80~~ | ~~80~~ | 17 | 136 |
| 18 | Molla Shabira (BAN) | B | 47.93 | 55 | 57 | ~~60~~ | 18 | 65 | 67 | ~~68~~ | 18 | 124 |

== New records ==
| Clean & Jerk | 118 kg | Wang Mingjuan (CHN) | WR |
| Total | 211 kg | Wang Mingjuan (CHN) | WR |
| Total | 213 kg | Wang Mingjuan (CHN) | WR |
