= 2001 World Weightlifting Championships – Women's 48 kg =

The 2001 World Weightlifting Championships were held in Antalya, Turkey from November 4 to November 11. The women's competition in 48 kg division was staged on 4 November 2001.

== Medalists ==
Event	Gold		Silver		Bronze	
Snatch	Gao Wei (CHN)	85.0 kg	Remigia Arcila (VEN)	77.5 kg	Gema Peris (ESP)	75.0 kg
Clean & Jerk	Gao Wei (CHN)	105.0 kg	Blessed Udoh (NGR)	100.0 kg	Chen Han-tung (TPE)	95.0 kg
Total	Gao Wei (CHN)	190.0 kg	Blessed Udoh (NGR)	175.0 kg	Chen Han-tung (TPE)	170.0 kg

== Records ==
Prior to this competition, the existing world records were as follows.

World Record	Snatch	Liu Xiuhua (CHN)	87.5 kg	Montreal, Canada	9 June 2000
World Record	Clean & Jerk	Donka Mincheva (BUL)	113.5 kg	Athens, Greece	21 November 1999
World Record	Total	Liu Xiuhua (CHN)	197.5 kg	Montreal, Canada	9 June 2000

== Results ==
Rank	Athlete	Body weight	Snatch (kg)				Clean & Jerk (kg)				Total
Rank	Athlete	Body weight	1	2	3	Rank	1	2	3	Rank	Total
1st place, gold medalist(s)	Gao Wei (CHN)	47.54	80.0	85.0	~~88.0~~	1st place, gold medalist(s)	105.0	~~114.0~~	~~114.0~~	1st place, gold medalist(s)	190.0
2nd place, silver medalist(s)	Blessed Udoh (NGR)	47.84	70.0	75.0	~~77.5~~	5	95.0	~~100.0~~	100.0	2nd place, silver medalist(s)	175.0
3rd place, bronze medalist(s)	Chen Han-tung (TPE)	47.46	~~75.0~~	75.0	~~77.5~~	4	95.0	~~100.0~~	~~100.0~~	3rd place, bronze medalist(s)	170.0
4	Gema Peris (ESP)	47.44	72.5	~~75.0~~	75.0	3rd place, bronze medalist(s)	85.0	90.0	92.5	4	167.5
5	Remigia Arcila (VEN)	48.00	70.0	75.0	77.5	2nd place, silver medalist(s)	~~90.0~~	~~90.0~~	90.0	8	167.5
6	Svetlana Ulyanova (RUS)	47.78	67.5	72.5	~~77.5~~	6	90.0	~~95.0~~	~~95.0~~	7	162.5
7	Sabrina Richard (FRA)	47.50	65.0	67.5	~~70.0~~	9	85.0	87.5	90.0	5	157.5
8	Tikina Gopal (IND)	47.72	67.5	~~70.0~~	~~70.0~~	11	87.5	~~90.0~~	90.0	6	157.5
9	Snejana Popova (RUS)	47.92	65.0	70.0	~~72.5~~	7	85.0	~~87.5~~	~~87.5~~	11	155.0
10	Betsabé García (MEX)	47.50	~~67.5~~	67.5	~~72.5~~	10	85.0	~~90.0~~	~~90.0~~	10	152.5
11	Karine Turcotte (CAN)	47.40	62.5	~~65.0~~	65.0	12	80.0	82.5	85.0	9	150.0
12	María José Tocino (ESP)	47.30	~~67.5~~	~~67.5~~	67.5	8	75.0	80.0	~~82.5~~	12	147.5
13	Renata Natan (ISR)	47.60	45.0	50.0	~~52.5~~	13	55.0	60.0	62.5	13	112.5
