= 1997 World Weightlifting Championships – Women's 46 kg =

The 1997 World Weightlifting Championships were held in Chiang Mai, Thailand from December 6 to December 14. The women's competition in the 46 kg division was staged on 6 December 1997.

== Medalists ==
| Event | Gold | | Silver | | Bronze | |
|---|---|---|---|---|---|---|
| Snatch | Kyi Kyi Than (MYA) | 77.5 kg | Liu Ling (CHN) | 75.0 kg | Sri Indriyani (INA) | 75.0 kg |
| Clean & Jerk | Liu Ling (CHN) | 100.0 kg | Kunjarani Devi (IND) | 97.5 kg | Sri Indriyani (INA) | 95.0 kg |
| Total | Liu Ling (CHN) | 175.0 kg | Kunjarani Devi (IND) | 170.0 kg | Sri Indriyani (INA) | 170.0 kg |

== Records ==
Prior to this competition, the existing world records were as follows.

| World Record | Snatch | Jiang Yinsu (CHN) | 81.5 kg | Busan, South Korea | 11 May 1997 |
| World Record | Clean & Jerk | Xing Fen (CHN) | 105.5 kg | Yangzhou, China | 8 July 1997 |
| World Record | Total | Guan Hong (CHN) | 185.0 kg | Yachiyo, Japan | 4 April 1996 |

== Results ==
| Rank | Athlete | Body weight | Snatch (kg) | | | | Clean & Jerk (kg) | | | | Total |
| Rank | Athlete | Body weight | 1 | 2 | 3 | Rank | 1 | 2 | 3 | Rank | Total |
|---|---|---|---|---|---|---|---|---|---|---|---|
| 1st place, gold medalist(s) | Liu Ling (CHN) | 45.45 | 70.0 | ~~75.0~~ | 75.0 | 2nd place, silver medalist(s) | 95.0 | 100.0 | ~~106.0~~ | 1st place, gold medalist(s) | 175.0 |
| 2nd place, silver medalist(s) | Kunjarani Devi (IND) | 45.80 | 67.5 | 72.5 | ~~75.0~~ | 4 | 95.0 | 97.5 | ~~102.5~~ | 2nd place, silver medalist(s) | 170.0 |
| 3rd place, bronze medalist(s) | Sri Indriyani (INA) | 45.95 | 72.5 | 75.0 | ~~77.5~~ | 3rd place, bronze medalist(s) | 92.5 | 95.0 | ~~97.5~~ | 3rd place, bronze medalist(s) | 170.0 |
| 4 | Kyi Kyi Than (MYA) | 45.50 | 75.0 | 77.5 | 80.0 | 1st place, gold medalist(s) | 90.0 | ~~95.0~~ | ~~95.0~~ | 4 | 167.5 |
| 5 | Tsai Huey-woan (TPE) | 45.80 | ~~70.0~~ | 70.0 | 72.5 | 5 | ~~87.5~~ | ~~87.5~~ | 87.5 | 5 | 160.0 |
| 6 | Udomporn Polsak (THA) | 45.95 | 62.5 | 67.5 | 72.5 | 6 | 80.0 | ~~87.5~~ | ~~87.5~~ | 8 | 152.5 |
| 7 | Remigia Arcila (VEN) | 45.25 | 62.5 | 65.0 | 67.5 | 7 | 82.5 | ~~85.0~~ | ~~85.0~~ | 7 | 150.0 |
| 8 | Aree Wiratthaworn (THA) | 45.55 | 62.5 | 65.0 | ~~67.5~~ | 8 | 85.0 | ~~90.0~~ | ~~90.0~~ | 6 | 150.0 |
| 9 | Olga Zubenko (RUS) | 46.00 | 50.0 | ~~60.0~~ | 60.0 | 10 | 70.0 | 75.0 | 77.5 | 9 | 137.5 |
| 10 | Danila Manca (ITA) | 45.45 | 60.0 | ~~62.5~~ | ~~62.5~~ | 9 | ~~75.0~~ | 75.0 | ~~80.0~~ | 10 | 135.0 |
| DQ | Grisel Abarca (ARG) | 45.85 | 57.5 | ~~60.0~~ | 60.0 | — | ~~72.5~~ | 72.5 | 75.0 | — | — |
