= Beiranvand =

Beiranvand (Persian: بیرانوند) is an Iranian surname. Notable people with the surname include:

- Alireza Beiranvand (born 1992), Iranian football goalkeeper
- Mohsen Beiranvand (born 1981), Iranian weightlifter
