= Virginie Andrieux =

French weightlifter

Personal information
- Full name: Virginie C. R. Lachaume Andrieux
- Born: 21 March 1980 (age 46) Martigues, France
- Height: 160 cm (5 ft 3 in)
- Weight: 52.55 kg (115.9 lb)

Sport
- Country: France
- Sport: Weightlifting
- Club: CMHM (La Ferté Milon)
- Team: National team
- Updated on 6 September 2016

Virginie C. R. Lachaume Andrieux (born 21 March 1980, in Martigues) is a French female weightlifter, competing in the 53 kg category and representing France at international competitions.

She participated at the 2004 Summer Olympics in the 53 kg event. She competed at world championships, most recently at the 2011 World Weightlifting Championships.

== Major results ==
Year	Venue	Weight	Snatch (kg)				Clean & Jerk (kg)				Total	Rank
Year	Venue	Weight	1	2	3	Rank	1	2	3	Rank	Total	Rank
Summer Olympics
2004	Athens, Italy	53 kg										7
World Championships
2002	Warsaw, Poland	53 kg	70	72.5	~~75~~	15	90	95	~~97.5~~	11	167.5	14
2003	Vancouver, Canada	53 kg	~~75~~	~~75~~	75	16	97.5	100	~~102.5~~	15	175	16
2006	Santo Domingo, Dominican Republic	53 kg	73	~~76~~	~~76~~	21	93	~~95~~	~~95~~	22	166.0	22
2007	Chiang Mai, Thailand	53 kg	77	~~79~~	~~79~~	21	99	~~102~~	~~102~~	23	176	21
2011	Paris, France	53 kg	~~74~~	74	77	20	94	~~97~~	~~97~~	25	171	22

- Andrieux also competed in the 2009 European Weightlifting Championship.

=== Mediterranean Games ===
She was won 2 Bronze in Weightlifting at the 2009 Mediterranean Games after DQ of one athletes.
