= Nadeene Latif =

Australian weightlifter

Personal information
- Full name: Nadeene Latif
- Born: 20 May 1978 (age 48)
- Weight: 52.83 kg (116.5 lb)

Sport
- Country: Australia
- Sport: Weightlifting
- Weight class: 53 kg
- Team: National team
Medal record
Commonwealth Games
Bronze medal – third place	2006 Melbourne	53 kg combined
- Updated on 27 September 2016

Nadeene Latif (born 20 May 1978) is an Australian female weightlifter, competing in the 53 kg category and representing Australia at international competitions. She competed at world championships, most recently at the 2006 World Weightlifting Championships.

== Major results ==
Year	Venue	Weight	Snatch (kg)				Clean & Jerk (kg)				Total	Rank
Year	Venue	Weight	1	2	3	Rank	1	2	3	Rank	Total	Rank
World Championships
2006	Santo Domingo, Dominican Republic	53 kg	66	~~67~~	~~67~~	27	83	~~86~~	~~86~~	26	149.0	26

Australia grabbed another women's weightlifting medal last night at the Melbourne Exhibition Centre. Nadeene Latif took bronze in the 53-kilogram event, which was marred by an ugly injury to Papua New Guinean lifter Dika Toua. Toua, 21, who weighs only 52.87kg, was trapped awkwardly under a 108kg bar after botching an attempt at the clean and jerk and sought medical treatment for an injured leg. Remarkably, she returned to the floor just a couple of minutes later to have another crack at the same weight, but again failed. That left Canadian Maryse Turcotte to take gold and in the process set a Commonwealth Games record for both the clean and jerk and total lift. Turcotte's total of 188kg beat the previous record by six kilograms and her clean and jerk of 108kg beat the previous record by eight kilograms. Latif, 27, was the lightest lifter in a slim field of only five competitors, weighing in at just 52.32kg. And it was that light weight that gave the Australian the edge over Seychelles lifter Clementina Agricole, who matched her total of 152kg. Latif chose not to complete her third clean and jerk lift and rather bluff increasing the bar weight forcing an injured Toua to attempt it because she knew she had the bronze in hand if an injured Toua couldn't lift. Although the difference between silver and bronze was massive, it was nice to see an Australian get a medal.
