= Weightlifting at the 2000 Summer Olympics – Women's 48 kg =

Weightlifting at the Olympics

Women's 48 kg at the Games of the XXVII Olympiad
- Venue: Sydney Convention and Exhibition Centre
- Date: 17 September 2000
- Competitors: 12 from 9 nations

Medalists
1st place, gold medalist(s)		Tara Nott	United States
2nd place, silver medalist(s)		Raema Lisa Rumbewas	Indonesia
3rd place, bronze medalist(s)		Sri Indriyani	Indonesia

The women's 48 kilograms weightlifting event at the 2000 Summer Olympics in Sydney, Australia took place at the Sydney Convention and Exhibition Centre on September 17.

Total score was the sum of the lifter's best result in each of the snatch and the clean and jerk, with three lifts allowed for each lift. In case of a tie, the lighter lifter won; if still tied, the lifter who took the fewest attempts to achieve the total score won. Lifters without a valid snatch score did not perform the clean and jerk.

== Schedule ==
All times are Australian Eastern Time (UTC+10:00)

Date	Time	Event
17 September 2000	14:30	Group A

== Records ==
Prior to this competition, the existing world and Olympic records were as follows.

World Record	Snatch	Liu Xiuhua (CHN)	87.5 kg	Montreal, Canada	9 June 2000
World Record	Clean & Jerk	Donka Mincheva (BUL)	113.5 kg	Athens, Greece	21 November 1999
World Record	Total	Liu Xiuhua (CHN)	197.5 kg	Montreal, Canada	9 June 2000
Olympic Record	Snatch	Olympic Standard	87.5 kg	—	1 January 1997
Olympic Record	Clean & Jerk	Olympic Standard	112.5 kg	—	1 January 1997
Olympic Record	Total	Olympic Standard	197.5 kg	—	1 January 1997

== Results ==
Rank	Athlete	Group	Body weight	Snatch (kg)				Clean & Jerk (kg)				Total
Rank	Athlete	Group	Body weight	1	2	3	Result	1	2	3	Result	Total
1st place, gold medalist(s)	Tara Nott (USA)	A	47.48	80.0	~~82.5~~	82.5	82.5	100.0	102.5	~~105.0~~	102.5	185.0
2nd place, silver medalist(s)	Raema Lisa Rumbewas (INA)	A	47.98	80.0	~~85.0~~	~~85.0~~	80.0	102.5	105.0	~~107.5~~	105.0	185.0
3rd place, bronze medalist(s)	Sri Indriyani (INA)	A	47.28	80.0	~~82.5~~	82.5	82.5	~~100.0~~	~~100.0~~	100.0	100.0	182.5
4	Kay Thi Win (MYA)	A	47.48	80.0	~~85.0~~	~~85.0~~	80.0	100.0	~~105.0~~	~~105.0~~	100.0	180.0
5	Robin Goad (USA)	A	47.66	77.5	~~80.0~~	~~80.0~~	77.5	95.0	100.0	~~105.0~~	100.0	177.5
6	Kaori Niyanagi (JPN)	A	47.66	75.0	~~80.0~~	~~80.0~~	75.0	~~100.0~~	100.0	~~105.0~~	100.0	175.0
7	Eva Giganti (ITA)	A	46.56	~~77.5~~	~~77.5~~	77.5	77.5	92.5	~~95.0~~	~~95.0~~	92.5	170.0
8	Sabrina Richard (FRA)	A	46.88	70.0	~~72.5~~	~~75.0~~	70.0	87.5	~~92.5~~	~~92.5~~	87.5	157.5
9	Maria Elisabete Jorge (BRA)	A	47.40	55.0	~~60.0~~	60.0	60.0	75.0	~~80.0~~	~~80.0~~	75.0	135.0
10	Dika Toua (PNG)	A	47.36	~~45.0~~	45.0	50.0	50.0	62.5	67.5	~~72.5~~	67.5	117.5
—	Donka Mincheva (BUL)	A	47.62	~~80.0~~	~~80.0~~	~~82.5~~	—	—	—	—	—	—
DQ	Izabela Dragneva (BUL)	A	47.78	80.0	~~85.0~~	85.0	85.0	100.0	105.0	—	105.0	~~190.0~~

- Bulgaria's Izabela Dragneva originally won the gold medal, but she was disqualified after she tested positive for furosemide.
