= Rosivé Silgado =

Colombian weightlifter (born 1995)

Personal information
- Born: 30 June 1995 (age 31)

Sport
- Country: Colombia
- Sport: Weightlifting
- Events: 59 kg; 64 kg
Medal record
Representing Colombia
Women's weightlifting
Pan American Championships
Gold medal – first place	2019 Guatemala City	59 kg
Gold medal – first place	2024 Caracas	64 kg
Silver medal – second place	2017 Miami	63 kg
Silver medal – second place	2020 Santo Domingo	59 kg
Silver medal – second place	2021 Guayaquil	59 kg

Rosivé Silgado (born 30 June 1995) is a Colombian weightlifter. She is a four-time medalist at the Pan American Weightlifting Championships, including the gold medal in her event at the 2019 Pan American Weightlifting Championships. She won the bronze medal in the women's 59 kg Clean & Jerk event at the 2021 World Weightlifting Championships held in Tashkent, Uzbekistan.

In 2019, Silgado competed in the women's 59 kg event at the Pan American Games held in Lima, Peru. In this competition she lifted 93 kg in the Snatch event but failed to register a successful result in the Clean & Jerk.

In 2024, she won the gold medal in the women's 64 kg event at the Pan American Weightlifting Championships held in Caracas, Venezuela.
