= Nan Aye Khine =

Burmese weightlifter

Nan Aye Khine (Burmese: နန်အေးခိုင်) born 19 September 1976) is a Burmese weightlifter who competed in the women's 48 kg at the 2004 Summer Olympics. She originally finished fourth, but tested positive for a steroid and was disqualified.

== See also ==
- List of sportspeople sanctioned for doping offences
