= Nurcan Taylan =

Turkish weightlifter (born 1983)

Personal information
- Nationality: Turkish
- Born: 29 October 1983 (age 42) Ankara, Turkey
- Height: 1.52 m (5 ft 0 in)
- Weight: 48 kg (106 lb)

Sport
- Country: Turkey
- Sport: Weightlifting
- Event: – 48 kg
- Club: Yenimahalle Sports Club, Ankara

Achievements and titles
- Personal bests: Snatch: 97.5 kg (2004); Clean and jerk: 112.5 kg (2004); Total: 210 kg (2004)
Medal record
Olympic Games
Gold medal – first place	2004 Athens	– 48 kg
World Championships
Disqualified	2010 Antalya	–48 kg
Silver medal – second place	2002 Warsaw	–48 kg
Bronze medal – third place	2003 Vancouver	–48 kg
Disqualified	2009 Goyang	–48 kg
European Championships
Gold medal – first place	2003 Loutraki	–53 kg
Gold medal – first place	2004 Kyiv	–53 kg
Gold medal – first place	2008 Lignano Sabbiadoro	–48 kg
Disqualified	2009 Bucharest	–48 kg
Disqualified	2010 Minsk	–48 kg
Disqualified	2011 Kazan	–48 kg
Silver medal – second place	2007 Strasbourg	–48 kg
Disqualified	2014 Tel Aviv	–48 kg
Disqualified	2015 Tbilisi	–48 kg
Bronze medal – third place	2002 Antalya	–48 kg
Mediterranean Games
Gold medal – first place	2005 Almería	– 53 kg
Disqualified	2009 Pescara	– 53 kg

Nurcan Taylan (born 29 October 1983 in Ankara, Turkey) is a Turkish Olympic, world and European champion in weightlifting. She holds six European and one world record (and tied two more world records). She was banned by the International Weightlifting Federation (IWF) after she tested positive for the anabolic steroid Methandienone for two years starting on 26 October 2011.

== Career ==
She was born in Mamak, Ankara as the third child of a poor family from the town of Hafik in Sivas, Central Anatolia. Taylan was discovered aged 11 by the Turkish national athlete and her later coach Mehmet Üstündağ as he was her teacher in physical education at the Mamak Secondary School in Ankara.

Only 1.52 m (5 ft) tall, she lifted two World and five Olympic records in the women's 48 kg category at the 2004 Summer Olympics in Athens. Taylan is Turkey's first ever female Olympic gold medalist.

=== Scandals ===
In September 2004, a Turkish court ordered the arrest of the coach of the Turkish women's weightlifting team, Mehmet Üstündağ, after three female athletes filed complaints of sexual harassment against him. In court, Üstündağ denied allegations of repeated physical sexual molestation going back several years, fielded by Sibel Şimşek, Aylin Daşdelen and Şule Şahbaz, all of them members of the Turkish women's team at the 2004 Athens Olympics.

But the court ordered him to be placed under detention in view of the "alleged crime's nature, the evidence collected and feelings of anger it has inspired in the public". The allegations first hit the media in early September when the three athletes gave extensive interviews to newspapers and television channels. Daşdelen told a television news program that Üstündağ also made it a habit of "beating" his charges, going so far as to blame the trainer for the 1999 suicide of teammate Esma Can. The only support for Üstündağ came from Taylan, who in turn "accused" her three teammates of being lesbians. Turkish sports officials immediately launched an official investigation. Üstündağ had come under investigation on similar charges four years ago, but the evidence was inconclusive. The Turkish Weightlifting Federation did not allow Taylan to participate at the 2005 European Weightlifting Championship held in Sofia, Bulgaria.

=== Doping case ===
She was banned by the International Weightlifting Federation (IWF) after she tested positive for the anabolic steroid Methandienone for four years starting on 26 October 2011. Taylan missed the London Olympics.

In October 2012, her suspension was shortened to two years that would allow her to return to action on 26 October 2013.

=== DQ and change results ===
Taylan was disqualified (DQ) and all results were invalidated from 2008 Summer Olympics to 2016 Summer Olympics.

== Major results ==
https://iwf.sport/weightlifting_/athletes-bios/?athlete=taylan-nurcan-1983-10-29&id=91

- Team Points: 28-25-23-22-21-20-19-18-17-16-15-14-13-12-11-10-9-8-7-6-5-4-3-2-1 points are distributed for the 1st to 25th place for the individual lifts and the total.

Disqualified from 24 Medals:

1. 2G, 5S, 1B (8 Medals) in World Championships
2. 10G, 2S, 2B (14 Medals) in Euro Championships
3. 2G (2 Medals) in Mediterranean Games

Year	Venue	Weight	Rank			
Year	Venue	Weight	Snatch	Cl&Jerk	Total	Team Points
Olympic Games
2004	Greece	48 kg	—N/a	—N/a	1st place, gold medalist(s)	—N/a
2008	China	48 kg	—N/a	—N/a	NM	—N/a
World Championships
2002	Poland	48 kg	2nd place, silver medalist(s)	2nd place, silver medalist(s)	2nd place, silver medalist(s)	75
2003	Canada	48 kg	3rd place, bronze medalist(s)	5	3rd place, bronze medalist(s)	67
2007	Thailand	48 kg	3rd place, bronze medalist(s)	NM	NM	23
2009	South Korea	48 kg	2nd place, silver medalist(s)	2nd place, silver medalist(s)	3rd place, bronze medalist(s)	73
2010	Turkey	48 kg	1st place, gold medalist(s)	2nd place, silver medalist(s)	1st place, gold medalist(s)	81
2014	Kazakhstan	48 kg	2nd place, silver medalist(s)	4	2nd place, silver medalist(s)	72
2015	United States	48 kg	19	21	20	18
Mediterranean Games
2005	Spain	53 kg	1st place, gold medalist(s)	1st place, gold medalist(s)	—N/a	—N/a
2009	Italy	53 kg	1st place, gold medalist(s)	1st place, gold medalist(s)	—N/a	—N/a
European Championships
2002	Turkey	48 kg	2nd place, silver medalist(s)	3rd place, bronze medalist(s)	3rd place, bronze medalist(s)	71
2003	Greece	53 kg	1st place, gold medalist(s)	1st place, gold medalist(s)	1st place, gold medalist(s)	84
2004	Ukraine	53 kg	1st place, gold medalist(s)	1st place, gold medalist(s)	1st place, gold medalist(s)	84
2007	France	48 kg	3rd place, bronze medalist(s)	2nd place, silver medalist(s)	2nd place, silver medalist(s)	73
2008	Italy	48 kg	2nd place, silver medalist(s)	2nd place, silver medalist(s)	1st place, gold medalist(s)	78
2009	Romania	48 kg	1st place, gold medalist(s)	1st place, gold medalist(s)	1st place, gold medalist(s)	84
2010	Belarus	48 kg	1st place, gold medalist(s)	1st place, gold medalist(s)	1st place, gold medalist(s)	84
2011	Russia	48 kg	1st place, gold medalist(s)	1st place, gold medalist(s)	1st place, gold medalist(s)	84
2014	Israel	48 kg	4	2nd place, silver medalist(s)	3rd place, bronze medalist(s)	70
2015	Georgia	48 kg	1st place, gold medalist(s)	4	2nd place, silver medalist(s)	75
2016	Norway	48 kg	3rd place, bronze medalist(s)	5	4	66

== Achievements ==
Olyimpic Games

Rank	Discipline	Snatch	Clean&Jerk	Total	Place	Date
Gold	48 kg	97.5 CWR		210.0 WR	Athens, GRE	August 14, 2004
Silver	48 kg		112.5		Athens, GRE	August 14, 2004

World Championships

Rank	Discipline	Snatch	Clean&Jerk	Total	Place	Date
Gold	48 kg	93.0	121.0 WR	214.0	Antalya, TUR	18 September 2010
Silver	48 kg	90.0	115.0		Goyang, KOR	November 21, 2009
Bronze	48 kg			205.0	Goyang, KOR	November 21, 2009
Silver	48 kg	87.5	105.0	192.5	Warsaw, POL	19 November 2002
Bronze	48 kg	85.0		187.5	Vancouver, B.C., CAN	November 18, 2003
5	48 kg		102.5		Vancouver, B.C., CAN	November 18, 2003

European Championships

Rank	Discipline	Snatch	Clean&Jerk	Total	Place	Date
Gold	48 kg	90.0	105.0	195.0	Kazan, RUS	11 April 2011
Gold	48 kg	90.0	118.0	208.0	Minsk, BLR	5 April 2010
Gold	48 kg	88.0	108.0	196.0	Bucharest, ROM	6 April 2009
Gold	48 kg	87.0	109.0	196.0	Lignano Sabbiadoro, ITA	2 April 2008
Gold	53 kg	95.5 ER	115.5 ER	210.0	Kyiv, UKR	20 April 2004
Gold	J 53 kg	95.0 ER	115.0 ER	210.0 ER	Loutraki, GRE	15 April 2003
Gold	J 48 kg	87.5 ER	105.0 ER	192.5 ER	Warsaw, POL	19 November 2002

Mediterranean Games

Rank	Discipline	Snatch	Clean&Jerk	Total	Place	Date
Gold	53 kg	87.0 MR	108.0 MR		Almería, ESP	26 June 2005

- J: Junior
- CWR: Current world record
- WR: World record
- ER: European record
- MR: Mediterranean record

== World rank ==
2004 World ranking list for the category "Women 48 kg" is as following:

Rank	Athlete	Snatch	Clean&Jerk	Total	Place	Date
1	Nurcan Taylan, TUR	97.5	112.5	210.0	Athens, GRE	14 August 2004
2	Zhuo Li, CHN	90.0	115.0	205.0	Almaty, Kazakhstan	7 April 2004
3	Wei Gao, CHN	90.0	110.0	200.0	Minsk, BLR	24 May 2004
3=	Aree Wiratthaworn, THA	85.0	115.0	200.0	Athens, GRE	14 August 2004
