= Blessed Udoh =

Nigerian weightlifter (born 1984)

Personal information
- Full name: Blessed Udoh
- Born: 17 November 1984 (age 41)
- Weight: 47.84 kg (105.5 lb)

Sport
- Country: Nigeria
- Sport: Weightlifting
- Weight class: 48 kg
- Team: National team
- Updated on 27 September 2016

Blessed Udoh (born 17 November 1984) is a Nigerian female weightlifter, competing in the 48 kg category and representing Nigeria at international competitions.

She participated at the 2004 Summer Olympics in the 48 kg event. She competed at world championships, most recently at the 2001 World Weightlifting Championships.

Udoh won 3 medals in the women's 48 kg category at the 2007 All-Africa Games, but tested positive after the competition.

== Major results ==
Year	Venue	Weight	Snatch (kg)				Clean & Jerk (kg)				Total	Rank
Year	Venue	Weight	1	2	3	Rank	1	2	3	Rank	Total	Rank
Summer Olympics
2004	Athens, Greece	48 kg				—N/a				—N/a		7
World Championships
2001	Antalya, Turkey	48 kg	70	75	~~77.5~~	5	95	~~100~~	100	2nd place, silver medalist(s)	175	2nd place, silver medalist(s)
