= Chen Han-tung =

Taiwanese weightlifter (born 1980)

Personal information
- Full name: Chen Han-tung
- Born: 5 December 1980 (age 45)
- Height: 145 cm (4 ft 9 in)
- Weight: 47.42 kg (104.5 lb)

Sport
- Country: Chinese Taipei
- Sport: Weightlifting
- Weight class: 48 kg
- Team: National team
- Updated on 13 September 2016

Chen Han-tung (Chinese: 陳涵彤; born 5 December 1980) is a Taiwanese weightlifter, competing in the 48 kg category and representing Chinese Taipei at international competitions.

She participated at the 2004 Summer Olympics in the 48 kg event. She competed at world championships, most recently at the 2005 World Weightlifting Championships.

== Major results ==
Year	Venue	Weight	Snatch (kg)				Clean & Jerk (kg)				Total	Rank
Year	Venue	Weight	1	2	3	Rank	1	2	3	Rank	Total	Rank
Summer Olympics
2004	Athens, Italy	48 kg				—N/a				—N/a		6
World Championships
2005	Doha, Qatar	48 kg	~~75~~	75	~~78~~	10	95	100	~~105~~	8	175.0	8
2003	Vancouver, Canada	48 kg	~~72.5~~	72.5	~~77.5~~	12	95	~~97.5~~	~~97.5~~	10	167.5	10
2002	Warsaw, Poland	48 kg	77.5	~~80~~	~~80~~	4	~~100~~	~~102.5~~	~~102.5~~	---	0	---
2001	Antalya, Turkey	48 kg	~~75~~	75	~~77.5~~	4	95	~~100~~	~~100~~	3rd place, bronze medalist(s)	170	3rd place, bronze medalist(s)
