= Maria Elisabete Jorge =

Brazilian weightlifter

Personal information
- Full name: Maria Elizabet Jorge
- Born: 20 April 1957 (age 69) Viçosa, Minas Gerais, Brazil
- Height: 154 cm (5 ft 1 in)
- Weight: 52.12 kg (114.9 lb)

Sport
- Country: Brazil
- Sport: Weightlifting
- Weight class: 53 kg
- Team: National team
- Updated on 28 September 2016

Maria Elizabet Jorge (born 20 April 1957 in Viçosa, Minas Gerais) was a Brazilian female weightlifter, competing in the 53 kg category and representing Brazil at international competitions.

She participated at the 2000 Summer Olympics in the 48 kg event. She competed at world championships, most recently at the 1999 World Weightlifting Championships.

== Major results ==
Year	Venue	Weight	Snatch (kg)				Clean & Jerk (kg)				Total	Rank
Year	Venue	Weight	1	2	3	Rank	1	2	3	Rank	Total	Rank
Summer Olympics
2000	Sydney, Australia	48 kg				—N/a				—N/a		9
World Championships
1999	Piraeus, Greece	53 kg	60	~~65~~	65	21	77.5	~~82.5~~	82.5	23	147.5	23
