= Weightlifting at the 2004 Summer Olympics – Women's 53 kg =

Weightlifting at the Olympics

Women's 53 kg at the Games of the XXVIII Olympiad
- Venue: Nikaia Olympic Weightlifting Hall
- Date: 15 August 2004
- Competitors: 8 from 8 nations

Medalists
1st place, gold medalist(s)		Udomporn Polsak	Thailand
2nd place, silver medalist(s)		Raema Lisa Rumbewas	Indonesia
3rd place, bronze medalist(s)		Mabel Mosquera	Colombia

The women's 53 kilograms weightlifting event at the 2004 Summer Olympics in Athens, Greece took place at the Nikaia Olympic Weightlifting Hall on 15 August.

Total score was the sum of the lifter's best result in each of the snatch and the clean and jerk, with three lifts allowed for each lift. In case of a tie, the lighter lifter won; if still tied, the lifter who took the fewest attempts to achieve the total score won. Lifters without a valid snatch score did not perform the clean and jerk.

== Schedule ==
All times are Eastern European Summer Time (UTC+03:00)

Date	Time	Event
15 August 2004	16:30	Group A

== Records ==
{{{caption}}}
World Record	Snatch	Ri Song-hui (PRK)	102.5 kg	Busan, South Korea	1 October 2002
World Record	Clean & Jerk	Li Xuejiu (CHN)	127.5 kg	Warsaw, Poland	20 November 2002
World Record	Total	Yang Xia (CHN)	225.0 kg	Sydney, Australia	18 September 2000
Olympic Record	Snatch	Yang Xia (CHN)	100.0 kg	Sydney, Australia	18 September 2000
Olympic Record	Clean & Jerk	Yang Xia (CHN)	125.0 kg	Sydney, Australia	18 September 2000
Olympic Record	Total	Yang Xia (CHN)	225.0 kg	Sydney, Australia	18 September 2000

== Results ==
Rank	Athlete	Group	Body weight	Snatch (kg)				Clean & Jerk (kg)				Total
Rank	Athlete	Group	Body weight	1	2	3	Result	1	2	3	Result	Total
1st place, gold medalist(s)	Udomporn Polsak (THA)	A	52.83	92.5	97.5	~~100.0~~	97.5	117.5	122.5	125.0	125.0	222.5
2nd place, silver medalist(s)	Raema Lisa Rumbewas (INA)	A	52.80	85.0	90.0	95.0	95.0	115.0	~~122.5~~	~~125.0~~	115.0	210.0
3rd place, bronze medalist(s)	Mabel Mosquera (COL)	A	51.82	~~87.5~~	~~87.5~~	87.5	87.5	105.0	107.5	110.0	110.0	197.5
4	Marioara Munteanu (ROM)	A	52.55	~~85.0~~	~~85.0~~	85.0	85.0	95.0	~~105.0~~	105.0	105.0	190.0
5	Nastassia Novikava (BLR)	A	52.95	80.0	85.0	87.5	87.5	102.5	~~107.5~~	~~110.0~~	102.5	190.0
6	Dika Toua (PNG)	A	52.58	70.0	75.0	~~80.0~~	75.0	92.5	97.5	102.5	102.5	177.5
7	Virginie Lachaume (FRA)	A	52.71	75.0	~~80.0~~	~~80.0~~	75.0	95.0	100.0	~~105.0~~	100.0	175.0
DQ	Sanamacha Chanu (IND)	A	51.91	~~82.5~~	82.5	~~85.0~~	82.5	105.0	107.5	~~110.0~~	107.5	~~190.0~~

- Sanamacha Chanu of India originally finished fourth, but she was disqualified after she tested positive for furosemide.
