= Tatiana Matveeva (weightlifter) =

Russian weightlifter (born 1985)

Personal information
- Born: 26 February 1985 (age 41)
Medal record
Women's Weightlifting
Representing Russia
World Weightlifting Championships
Silver medal – second place	2006 Santo Domingo	– 69 kg
Bronze medal – third place	2011 Paris	– 69 kg
European Weightlifting Championships
Silver medal – second place	2004 Kiev	– 69 kg
Silver medal – second place	2007 Strasbourg	– 75 kg
Silver medal – second place	2008 Lignano Sabbiadoro	– 69 kg
Silver medal – second place	2011 Kazan	– 69 kg

Tatiana Weiss (born 26 February 1985) is a Russian weightlifter.

Matveeva participated in the women's -69 kg class at the 2006 World Weightlifting Championships and won the silver medal, finishing behind Oxana Slivenko. She snatched 110 kg and clean and jerked an additional 135 kg for a total of 245 kg, 18 kg behind winner Slivenko.

At the 2008 European Weightlifting Championships she won the silver medal in the 69 kg category.
