= 2009 World Weightlifting Championships – Women's 48 kg =

The women's competition in the flyweight (– 48 kg) division was staged on November 21, 2009.

== Schedule ==
Date	Time	Event
21 November 2009	13:00	Group B
21 November 2009	19:00	Group A

== Medalists ==
Event	Gold		Silver		Bronze	
Snatch	Wang Mingjuan (CHN)	93 kg	Sibel Özkan (TUR)	89 kg	Pensiri Laosirikul (THA)	85 kg
Clean & Jerk	Sibel Özkan (TUR)	117 kg	Wang Mingjuan (CHN)	115 kg	Chen Wei-ling (TPE)	112 kg
Total	Wang Mingjuan (CHN)	208 kg	Sibel Özkan (TUR)	206 kg	Chen Wei-ling (TPE)	196 kg

== Records ==
Prior to this competition, the existing world records were as follows.

World Record	Snatch	Yang Lian (CHN)	98 kg	Santo Domingo, Dominican	1 October 2006
World Record	Clean & Jerk	Chen Xiexia (CHN)	120 kg	Tai'an, China	21 April 2007
World Record	Total	Yang Lian (CHN)	217 kg	Santo Domingo, Dominican	1 October 2006

== Results ==
Rank	Athlete	Group	Body weight	Snatch (kg)				Clean & Jerk (kg)				Total
Rank	Athlete	Group	Body weight	1	2	3	Rank	1	2	3	Rank	Total
1st place, gold medalist(s)	Wang Mingjuan (CHN)	A	47.97	90	93	~~95~~	1st place, gold medalist(s)	110	115	118	(gold)	211
2nd place, silver medalist(s)	Sibel Özkan (TUR)	A	47.82	89	~~92~~	~~93~~	2nd place, silver medalist(s)	110	115	117	2nd place, silver medalist(s)	206
3rd place, bronze medalist(s)	Chen Wei-ling (TPE)	A	46.36	80	84	~~86~~	5	108	112	~~115~~	3rd place, bronze medalist(s)	196
4	Pensiri Laosirikul (THA)	A	47.51	82	85	~~87~~	3rd place, bronze medalist(s)	106	~~110~~	~~110~~	4	191
5	Im Jyoung-hwa (KOR)	A	47.68	80	85	~~89~~	4	~~103~~	103	~~111~~	5	188
6	Marzena Karpińska (POL)	A	47.64	79	~~81~~	82	6	95	98	100	7	182
7	Carolina Valencia (MEX)	A	47.80	78	~~82~~	82	7	97	100	~~103~~	8	182
8	Panida Khamsri (THA)	A	46.89	~~75~~	75	~~80~~	8	~~95~~	95	100	6	175
9	Kanae Yagi (JPN)	B	47.77	68	71	~~73~~	10	90	93	~~95~~	9	164
10	Kelly Rexroad (USA)	B	47.91	68	70	72	9	83	86	88	10	160
11	Anaïs Michel (FRA)	B	47.96	66	~~69~~	~~69~~	11	~~85~~	85	~~88~~	11	151
12	Marina Sisoeva (UZB)	B	44.84	54	57	59	12	70	75	~~77~~	12	134
DQ	Nurcan Taylan (TUR)	A	47.44	~~90~~	90	~~93~~	—	110	~~114~~	115	—	—
