= Suda Chaleephay =

Thai weightlifter (born 1987)

Medal record

Women's Weightlifting

Representing Thailand

World Weightlifting Championships
Bronze medal – third place	2006 Santo Domingo	53 kg

Suda Chaleephay (born 6 June 1987 in Nakhon Ratchasima) is a Thai weightlifter.

Chaleephay participated in the women's -53 kg class at the 2006 World Weightlifting Championships and won the bronze medal, finishing behind Qiu Hongxia and Raema Lisa Rumbewas. She snatched 92 kg and clean and jerked an additional 115 kg for a total of 207 kg, 19 kg behind winner Qiu.

== Achievements ==
2006 World Weightlifting Championships, -53 kg
