= Wang Mingjuan =

Chinese weightlifter (born 1985)

Personal information
- Born: October 11, 1985 (age 40)
- Height: 1.5 m (4 ft 11 in)
- Weight: 48 kg (106 lb)

Sport
- Country: China
- Sport: Weightlifting
Medal record
Olympic Games
Gold medal – first place	2012 London	-48 kg
Asian Games
Gold medal – first place	2006 Doha	-48 kg
Gold medal – first place	2010 Guangzhou	-48 kg
World Weightlifting Championships
Gold medal – first place	2002 Warsaw	-48 kg
Gold medal – first place	2003 Vancouver	-48 kg
Gold medal – first place	2005 Doha	-48 kg
Gold medal – first place	2009 Goyang	-48 kg

Wang Mingjuan (Chinese: 王明娟; pinyin: Wáng Míngjuān; born October 11, 1985, in Yongzhou, Hunan) is a Chinese weightlifter, Olympic champion, and four time world champion.

== Career ==
She competed at the 2012 Summer Olympics in the Women's 48 kg division, winning the gold medal.

Over the course of her career she set 12 senior world records.

== Major results ==
Year	Venue	Weight	Snatch (kg)				Clean & Jerk (kg)				Total	Rank
Year	Venue	Weight	1	2	3	Rank	1	2	3	Rank	Total	Rank
Olympic Games
2012	London, England	48 kg	~~88~~	88	91	1	110	114	~~116~~	1	205	1st place, gold medalist(s)
World Championships
2002	Warsaw, Poland	48 kg	87.5	90.5 WR	92.5 WR	1st place, gold medalist(s)	110.0	112.5	115.5 WR	1st place, gold medalist(s)	207.5 WR	1st place, gold medalist(s)
2003	Vancouver, Canada	48 kg	85.0	~~90.0~~	90.0	1st place, gold medalist(s)	110.0	~~115.0~~	–	1st place, gold medalist(s)	200.0	1st place, gold medalist(s)
2005	Doha, Qatar	48 kg	183	93	95	1st place, gold medalist(s)	112	116	118 WR	1st place, gold medalist(s)	213 WR	1st place, gold medalist(s)
2009	Goyang, South Korea	48 kg	90	93	~~95~~	1st place, gold medalist(s)	110	115	–	3rd place, bronze medalist(s)	208	1st place, gold medalist(s)

== See also ==
- China at the 2012 Summer Olympics
