= Sunarto Rasidi =

Indonesian weightlifter

Personal information
- Full name: Sunarto Rasidi
- Born: 23 February 1975 (age 51)
- Height: 157 cm (5 ft 2 in)
- Weight: 61.59 kg (135.8 lb)

Sport
- Country: Indonesia
- Sport: Weightlifting
- Weight class: 62 kg
- Team: National team
- Updated on 14 September 2016

Sunarto Rasidi (born 23 February 1975) is an Indonesian male weightlifter, competing in the 62 kg category and representing Indonesia at international competitions. He competed at world championships, most recently at the 2003 World Weightlifting Championships. He participated at the 2004 Summer Olympics in the 62 kg event.

== Major results ==
Year	Venue	Weight	Snatch (kg)				Clean & Jerk (kg)				Total (kg)	Rank
Year	Venue	Weight	1	2	3	Rank	1	2	3	Rank	Total (kg)	Rank
Summer Olympics
2004	Sydney, Australia	62 kg	0	0	0	—N/a	0	0	0	—N/a	285.0	8
World Championships
2003	Vancouver, Canada	62 kg	125	~~130~~	~~130~~	12	~~155~~	155	~~160~~	9	280	9
