= 2021 World Weightlifting Championships – Women's 59 kg =

Weightlifting Championship

The women's 59 kilograms competition at the 2021 World Weightlifting Championships was held on 11 December 2021.

== Schedule ==
Date	Time	Event
11 December 2021	10:30	Group C
11 December 2021	16:00	Group B
11 December 2021	19:00	Group A

== Medalists ==
Event	Gold		Silver		Bronze	
Snatch	Mariia Hanhur (UKR)	101 kg	Kuo Hsing-chun (TPE)	100 kg	Olga Te (RWF)	100 kg
Clean & Jerk	Kuo Hsing-chun (TPE)	130 kg	Yenny Álvarez (COL)	127 kg	Rosivé Silgado (COL)	120 kg
Total	Kuo Hsing-chun (TPE)	230 kg	Yenny Álvarez (COL)	226 kg	Olga Te (RWF)	218 kg

== Records ==
Prior to this competition, the existing world records were as follows.

World Record	Snatch	Kuo Hsing-chun (TPE)	110 kg	Tashkent, Uzbekistan	19 April 2021
World Record	Clean & Jerk	Kuo Hsing-chun (TPE)	140 kg	Pattaya, Thailand	21 September 2019
World Record	Total	Kuo Hsing-chun (TPE)	247 kg	Tashkent, Uzbekistan	19 April 2021

== Results ==
Rank	Athlete	Group	Snatch (kg)				Clean & Jerk (kg)				Total
Rank	Athlete	Group	1	2	3	Rank	1	2	3	Rank	Total
1st place, gold medalist(s)	Kuo Hsing-chun (TPE)	A	97	100	~~102~~	2nd place, silver medalist(s)	125	128	130	1st place, gold medalist(s)	230
2nd place, silver medalist(s)	Yenny Álvarez (COL)	A	95	99	~~101~~	4	~~123~~	123	127	2nd place, silver medalist(s)	226
3rd place, bronze medalist(s)	Olga Te (RWF)	A	95	98	100	3rd place, bronze medalist(s)	113	118	~~120~~	4	218
4	Mariia Hanhur (UKR)	A	96	99	101	1st place, gold medalist(s)	114	~~118~~	~~119~~	8	215
5	Elreen Ando (PHI)	A	93	96	98	5	~~116~~	~~116~~	116	6	214
6	Rafiatu Lawal (NGR)	B	89	~~92~~	92	6	108	112	115	7	207
7	Ine Andersson (NOR)	A	87	89	90	10	113	116	~~120~~	5	206
8	Alexandra Escobar (ECU)	A	85	90	~~92~~	9	112	~~116~~	~~116~~	9	202
9	Aleksandra Kozlova (RWF)	A	90	~~93~~	~~93~~	8	110	~~114~~	~~114~~	12	200
10	Gilyeliz Guzmán (PUR)	C	86	89	~~91~~	11	110	~~115~~	~~115~~	10	199
11	Saara Retulainen (FIN)	B	~~87~~	~~87~~	87	14	108	~~113~~	~~113~~	13	195
12	Jessica Gordon Brown (GBR)	B	~~85~~	~~85~~	85	16	104	107	110	11	195
13	Irene Martínez (ESP)	B	90	~~92~~	~~93~~	7	101	104	~~106~~	20	194
14	Cansel Özkan (TUR)	B	~~88~~	88	~~90~~	12	104	106	~~108~~	16	194
15	Sarah (INA)	B	85	~~88~~	88	13	104	~~107~~	~~107~~	19	192
16	Sofia Georgopoulou (GRE)	B	~~86~~	86	~~89~~	15	102	106	~~109~~	15	192
17	Popy Hazarika (IND)	B	84	~~88~~	~~88~~	17	~~105~~	105	~~109~~	18	189
18	Nelly (INA)	B	~~83~~	83	~~86~~	18	105	~~110~~	~~110~~	17	188
19	Marianne Saarhelo (FIN)	B	~~79~~	79	~~82~~	20	103	107	~~111~~	14	186
20	Enkhbaataryn Enkhtamir (MGL)	C	78	82	~~85~~	19	96	~~100~~	~~100~~	22	178
21	Nadeeshani Rajapaksha (SRI)	C	70	72	74	21	~~90~~	90	~~95~~	23	164
22	Ivana Gorišek (CRO)	C	~~70~~	73	~~76~~	22	85	89	~~92~~	24	162
23	Winny Langat (KEN)	C	~~60~~	65	67	24	80	85	87	25	154
—	Mohideen Umeira (SRI)	C	~~67~~	67	~~70~~	23	~~88~~	~~88~~	~~88~~	—	—
—	Rosivé Silgado (COL)	A	~~94~~	~~94~~	~~94~~	—	~~118~~	~~119~~	120	3rd place, bronze medalist(s)	—
—	Sanne Bijleveld (NED)	B	~~83~~	~~83~~	~~83~~	—	103	~~106~~	~~106~~	21	—
—	Polina Gurýewa (TKM)	A	~~88~~	~~88~~	~~88~~	—	—	—	—	—	—
