= Kaori Niyanagi =

Japanese weightlifter

Personal information
- Full name: Kaori Niyanagi
- Born: 21 November 1977 (age 48) Shiga, Japan
- Height: 149 cm (4 ft 11 in)
- Weight: 47.71 kg (105.2 lb)

Sport
- Country: Japan
- Sport: Weightlifting
- Weight class: 48 kg
- Team: National team
- Updated on 28 September 2016

Kaori Niyanagi (original name: 二柳 かおり, born 21 November 1977 in Shiga) was a Japanese female weightlifter, competing in the 48 kg category and representing Japan at international competitions.

She participated at the 2000 Summer Olympics in the 48 kg event. She competed at world championships, most recently at the 1999 World Weightlifting Championships.

== Major results ==
Year	Venue	Weight	Snatch (kg)				Clean & Jerk (kg)				Total	Rank
Year	Venue	Weight	1	2	3	Rank	1	2	3	Rank	Total	Rank
Summer Olympics
2000	Sydney, Australia	48 kg				—N/a				—N/a		6
World Championships
1999	Piraeus, Greece	48 kg	75	~~80~~	80	4	100	105	~~107.5~~	3rd place, bronze medalist(s)	185	3rd place, bronze medalist(s)
1998	Lahti, Finland	48 kg	70	~~75~~	~~75~~	8	95	~~100~~	~~100~~	3rd place, bronze medalist(s)	165	8
