= Sabrina Richard =

French weightlifter

Personal information
- Full name: Sabryna Richard
- Born: 1 January 1977 (age 49)
- Weight: 47.46 kg (104.6 lb)

Sport
- Country: France
- Sport: Weightlifting
- Weight class: 48 kg
- Team: National team
- Updated on 13 September 2016

Sabrina Richard (also written as Sabryna Richard, born 1 January 1977) is a French female weightlifter, competing in the 48 kg category and representing France at international competitions. She competed at the 2000 Summer Olympics in Sydney, Australia, finishing in 8th place in the women's flyweight division (– 48 kg). She competed at world championships, most recently at the 2003 World Weightlifting Championships.

== Major results ==
Year	Venue	Weight	Snatch (kg)				Clean & Jerk (kg)				Total	Rank
Year	Venue	Weight	1	2	3	Rank	1	2	3	Rank	Total	Rank
World Championships
2003	Vancouver, Canada	48 kg	~~67.5~~	67.5	70	18	87.5	92.5	~~95~~	13	162.5	13
2001	Antalya, Turkey	48 kg	65	67.5	~~70~~	9	85	87.5	90	5	157.5	7
1999	Piraeus, Greece	48 kg	67.5	~~70~~	~~70~~	16	~~85~~	85	~~90~~	18	152.5	16
1998	Lahti, Finland	48 kg	~~62.5~~	62.5	67.5	10	75	80	~~82.5~~	11	147.5	10
