= Pratima Kumari =

Indian weightlifter

Pratima Kumari is an Indian weightlifter. Twenty-eight-year-old Pratima was a double gold medallist at the Manchester Commonwealth Games in 2002. She was subsequently suspended by International Weightlifting Federation (IWF) from international competition for a period of two years on doping charges.
