= Gema Peris =

Spanish weightlifter

Personal information
- Full name: Gema Peris Revert
- Born: 20 April 1983 (age 43) Valencia, Spain
- Height: 150 cm (4 ft 11 in)
- Weight: 47.65 kg (105.1 lb)

Sport
- Country: Spain
- Sport: Weightlifting
- Weight class: 48 kg
- Club: CH Alzira Valencia
- Team: National team
- Updated on 7 September 2016

Gema Peris Revert (Note: In this Spanish name, the first or paternal surname is Peris and the second or maternal family name is Revert.) (born 20 April 1983 in Valencia) is a Spanish female former weightlifter, competing in the 48 kg category and representing Spain at international competitions.

She participated at the 2004 Summer Olympics in the 48 kg event. She competed at world championships, most recently at the 2007 World Weightlifting Championships.

== Major results ==
Year	Venue	Weight	Snatch (kg)				Clean & Jerk (kg)				Total	Rank
Year	Venue	Weight	1	2	3	Rank	1	2	3	Rank	Total	Rank
Summer Olympics
2004	Athens, Greece	48 kg										12
World Championships
2007	Chiang Mai, Thailand	48 kg	70	~~73~~	~~73~~	19	85	~~88~~	~~88~~	23	155	23
2005	Doha, Qatar	48 kg	77	~~79~~	~~80~~	9	92	95	~~99~~	10	172.0	10
2003	Vancouver, Canada	48 kg	~~72.5~~	~~72.5~~	~~72.5~~	---	---	---	---	---	0	---
2002	Warsaw, Poland	48 kg	75	77.5	~~80~~	5	90	92.5	95	5	172.5	4
2001	Antalya, Turkey	48 kg	72.5	~~75~~	75	3rd place, bronze medalist(s)	85	90	92.5	4	167.5	4
1999	Piraeus, Greece	48 kg	70	72.5	75	12	85	87.5	90	14	165	14
