= Olga Te =

Russian weightlifter (born 1996)

Personal information
- Native name: Ольга Тё
- Born: 5 March 1996 (age 30)

Sport
- Country: Russia
- Sport: Weightlifting
- Weight class: 59 kg
Medal record
Women's weightlifting
Representing Individual Neutral Athletes
European Championships
Bronze medal – third place	2026 Batumi	58 kg
Representing Russian Weightlifting Federation
World Championships
Bronze medal – third place	2021 Tashkent	59 kg
Representing Russia
European Championships
Gold medal – first place	2021 Moscow	59 kg

Olga Sergeyevna Te (Russian: Ольга Сергеевна Тё, born 5 March 1996) is a Russian weightlifter. She won the gold medal in the women's 59 kg event at the 2021 European Weightlifting Championships held in Moscow, Russia. At the time, she won the silver medal but in October 2021, this became the gold medal as original gold medalist Boyanka Kostova of Azerbaijan was banned for testing positive for traces of stanozolol. She also won the bronze medal in the women's 59 kg event at the 2021 World Weightlifting Championships held in Tashkent, Uzbekistan.

== Career ==
In 2017, she won the bronze medal in the under-23 women's 63 kg snatch event at the European Junior & U23 Weightlifting Championships held in Durrës, Albania. A year later, she won the gold medal in the under-23 women's 58 kg event at the 2018 European Junior & U23 Weightlifting Championships held in Zamość, Poland. In 2018, she also competed in the women's 59 kg event at the World Weightlifting Championships in Ashgabat, Turkmenistan.

In 2019, she won the silver medal in the under-23 women's 59 kg event at the European Junior & U23 Weightlifting Championships in Bucharest, Romania.

== Achievements ==
Year	Venue	Weight	Snatch (kg)				Clean & Jerk (kg)				Total	Rank
Year	Venue	Weight	1	2	3	Rank	1	2	3	Rank	Total	Rank
World Championships
2018	Ashgabat, Turkmenistan	59 kg	90	95	~~98~~	7	105	~~108~~	108	20	203	14
2021	Tashkent, Uzbekistan	59 kg	95	98	100	3rd place, bronze medalist(s)	113	118	~~120~~	4	218	3rd place, bronze medalist(s)
European Championships
2021	Moscow, Russia	59 kg	95	~~98~~	~~98~~	1st place, gold medalist(s)	~~110~~	110	115	1st place, gold medalist(s)	210	1st place, gold medalist(s)
