= Mohsen Beiranvand =

Iranian weightlifter

Medal record

Representing Iran

Men's weightlifting

Asian Championships
Gold medal – first place	2003 Qinhuangdao	105 kg
Bronze medal – third place	2004 Almaty	105 kg
Silver medal – second place	2005 Dubai	105 kg

Mohsen Beiranvand (Persian: محسن بیرانوند, born 9 June 1981) is an Iranian weightlifter.

At the 2004 Summer Olympics, he participated in the 105 kg category, but failed in the snatch competition. He ranked 14th in the 105 kg category at the 2007 World Weightlifting Championships, with a total of 376 kg.

At the 2008 Summer Olympics, he ranked 10th in the 105 kg category, with a total of 390 kg.

== Notes and references ==
- Profile
