= Choe Un-sim =

North Korean weightlifter (born 1982)

Personal information
- Born: 6 May 1982 (age 43)
- Height: 147 cm (4 ft 10 in)
- Weight: 47.25 kg (104.2 lb)

Sport
- Country: North Korea
- Sport: Weightlifting
- Weight class: 48 kg
- Team: National team

Korean name
- Hangul: 최은심
- RR: Choe Eunsim
- MR: Ch'oe Ŭnsim
- Updated on 13 September 2016

Choe Un-sim (born 6 May 1982) is a North Korean female weightlifter, competing in the 48 kg category and representing North Korea at international competitions.

She participated at the 2004 Summer Olympics in the 48 kg event. She competed at world championships, most recently at the 2003 World Weightlifting Championships.

== Major results ==
Year	Venue	Weight	Snatch (kg)				Clean & Jerk (kg)				Total	Rank
Year	Venue	Weight	1	2	3	Rank	1	2	3	Rank	Total	Rank
Summer Olympics
2004	Athens, Italy	48 kg				—N/a				—N/a		8
World Championships
2003	Vancouver, Canada	48 kg	80	~~82.5~~	~~82.5~~	5	~~92.5~~	92.5	~~95~~	12	172.5	9
