= Yuan Aijun =

Chinese weightlifter (born 1977)

Personal information
- Born: April 7, 1977 (age 49)
Medal record
Men's Weightlifting
Representing China
Asian Games
Silver medal – second place	1998 Bangkok	– 85 kg

Yuan Aijun (simplified Chinese: 袁爱军; traditional Chinese: 袁愛軍; pinyin: Yuán Àijūn; born April 7, 1977, in Taizhou, Jiangsu) is a male Chinese weightlifter who competed in the 2004 Summer Olympics.

In 2004 he finished fifth in the 85 kg class.
