= Rosmainar =

Indonesian weightlifter

Personal information
- Full name: Rosmainar Rosmainar
- Born: 23 June 1976 (age 50) Jakarta, Indonesia
- Height: 150 cm (4 ft 11 in)
- Weight: 47.58 kg (104.9 lb)

Sport
- Country: Indonesia
- Sport: Weightlifting
- Weight class: 48 kg
- Team: National team
- Updated on 13 September 2016

Rosmainar (born 23 June 1976 in Jakarta) is a former Indonesian female weightlifter, competing in the 48 kg category and representing Indonesia at international competitions.

She participated at the 2004 Summer Olympics in the 48 kg event. She competed at world championships, at the 2003 World Weightlifting Championships.

== Major results ==
Year	Venue	Weight	Snatch (kg)				Clean & Jerk (kg)				Total	Rank
Year	Venue	Weight	1	2	3	Rank	1	2	3	Rank	Total	Rank
Summer Olympics
2004	Athens, Italy	48 kg				—N/a				—N/a		DNF
World Championships
2003	Vancouver, Canada	48 kg	77.5	~~80~~	~~80~~	7	97.5	~~102.5~~	105	3rd place, bronze medalist(s)	182.5	6
