= Raema Lisa Rumbewas =

Indonesian weightlifter (1980–2024)

Personal information
- Born: 10 September 1980 Biak, Irian Jaya, Indonesia
- Died: 14 January 2024 (aged 43) Jayapura, Papua, Indonesia
- Height: 149 cm (4 ft 11 in)
- Weight: 53 kg (117 lb)
Medal record
Women's weightlifting
Representing Indonesia
Olympic Games
Silver medal – second place	2000 Sydney	–48 kg
Silver medal – second place	2004 Athens	–53 kg
Bronze medal – third place	2008 Beijing	–53 kg
World Championships
Silver medal – second place	2006 Santo Domingo	–53 kg
Asian Games
Bronze medal – third place	2002 Busan	–48 kg
SEA Games
Gold medal – first place	2009 Vientiane	–53 kg
Silver medal – second place	2001 Kuala Lumpur	–53 kg
Silver medal – second place	2005 Manila	–58 kg
Bronze medal – third place	2003 Vietnam	–58 kg

Raema Lisa Rumbewas (10 September 1980 – 14 January 2024) was an Indonesian weightlifter. Through her career, she competed in various weight categories and represented Indonesia at the Summer Olympics on three occasions.

Born in Irian Jaya, Rumbewas became the first Indonesian athlete to win three Olympic medals upon winning bronze at the 2008 Summer Olympics in Beijing, China. She is one of only two Indonesian athletes to win three or more Olympic medals.

== Personal life ==
Rumbewas was born on 10 September 1980 in Biak, Irian Jaya, Indonesia. She was the cousin of women doubles badminton player Nitya Krishinda Maheswari, who participated in the 2016 Summer Olympics in Rio de Janeiro, Brazil.

== Weightlifting ==
Rumbewas first competed in an International Weightlifting Federation (IWF) event in 1999. She finished seventh in the women's –48 kg category at the 1999 World Weightlifting Championships in Athens, Greece.

A year later, she attended the 2000 Summer Olympics in Sydney, New South Wales, Australia. She won her first Olympic medal, taking home silver in the women's –48 kg category.

She returned to the Olympics in 2004 in Athens, Greece but this time contested the women's –53 kg category. She won silver for the second Olympics in a row.

In 2006, Rumbewas won silver at the 2006 World Weightlifting Championships in Santo Domingo, Dominican Republic in the women's –53 kg category.

At the 2008 Summer Olympics in Beijing, China, Rumbewas returned for her third and final Olympics. She won bronze in the women's –53 kg category to become the first Indonesian to win three Olympic medals.

Rumbewas is one of only two Indonesian athletes to have won three or more Olympic medals.

== Death ==
Rumbewas died on 14 January 2024 at the age of 43.
