= Sri Indriyani =

Indonesian weightlifter (born 1978)

Personal information
- Born: 12 November 1978 (age 47) Surakarta, Central Java, Indonesia
Medal record
Women's weightlifting
Representing Indonesia
Olympic Games
Bronze medal – third place	2000 Sydney	48 kg
World Championships
Silver medal – second place	1999 Athens	48 kg
Bronze medal – third place	1997 Chiang Mai	46 kg
Asian Games
Bronze medal – third place	1998 Bangkok	48 kg
SEA Games
Gold medal – first place	1997 Jakarta	46 kg
Bronze medal – third place	2001 Kuala Lumpur	48 kg
Junior World Championships
Gold medal – first place	1996 Warsaw	46 kg

Sri Indriyani (born 12 November 1978) is an Indonesian weightlifter who competed in the women's 48 kg weight class at the 2000 Summer Olympics and won the bronze medal, lifting 182.5 kg in total.

She became one of the Olympic Council of Asia flagbearer during the 2018 Asian Games opening ceremony.
