= Qiu Hongxia =

Chinese weightlifter (born 1982)

Personal information
- Born: 10 February 1982 (age 44)
Medal record
Women's Weightlifting
World Championships
Gold medal – first place	2006 Santo Domingo	–53 kg
Silver medal – second place	2001 Antalya	–53 kg

Qiu Hongxia (born 10 February 1982) is a Chinese weightlifter.

Qiu participated in the women's -53 kg class at the 2006 World Weightlifting Championships and won the gold medal, snatching 98 kg and clean and jerking an additional 128 kg for a total of 226 kg. With these lifts, she held the world records in the clean and jerk, and still holds one for the total in the women's 53 kg class.
