= Eva Giganti =

Italian weightlifter

Personal information
- Nationality: Italian
- Born: 29 May 1976 (age 49); San Cataldo, Italy

Sport
- Sport: Weightlifting

Eva Giganti (born 29 May 1976) is an Italian weightlifter. She competed in the women's flyweight event at the 2000 Summer Olympics.
