= Donka Mincheva =

Bulgarian weightlifter (born 1973)

Personal information
- Full name: Donka Mincheva
- Born: 9 May 1973 (age 53) Karlovo, Bulgaria
- Height: 150 cm (4 ft 11 in)
- Weight: 47.94 kg (105.7 lb)

Sport
- Country: Bulgaria
- Sport: Weightlifting
- Weight class: 48 kg
- Club: Metalik, Karlovo
- Team: National team
- Updated on 7 September 2016

Donka Mincheva (Донка Минчева, born 9 May 1973 in Karlovo) is a Bulgarian former weightlifter, competing in the 48 kg category and representing Bulgaria at international competitions. She participated in the 2000 Summer Olympics in the 48 kg event. She competed at world championships, most recently at the 2007 World Weightlifting Championships.

Mincheva was one of eleven Bulgarian weightlifters to test positive for a banned steroid two months prior to the 2008 Summer Olympics. Bulgaria withdrew its entire weightlifting team from the Olympic competition and Mincheva was banned from competing for four years. She then gave up her passion for weightlifting and is now living on the low, dealing with an alcohol addiction.

== Major results ==
Year	Venue	Weight	Snatch (kg)				Clean & Jerk (kg)				Total	Rank
Year	Venue	Weight	1	2	3	Rank	1	2	3	Rank	Total	Rank
Summer Olympics
2000	Sydney, Australia	48 kg	~~80~~	~~80~~	~~82.5~~	—	—	—	—	—	—	DNF
World Championships
2007	Chiang Mai, Thailand	48 kg	67	~~70~~	70	22	86	~~89~~	89	20	159	19
2002	Warsaw, Poland	53 kg	87.5	~~92.5~~	~~92.5~~	5	110	~~115~~	~~117.5~~	5	197.5	5
1999	Piraeus, Greece	48 kg	80	~~85~~	~~85~~	5	102.5	107.5	113.5	1st place, gold medalist(s)	192.5	1st place, gold medalist(s)
