= 2006 World Weightlifting Championships =

International weightlifting competition

2006 World Championships
- Host city: Santo Domingo, Dominican Republic
- Dates: 30 September – 7 October

The 2006 World Weightlifting Championships were held at the Handball Pavilion and Weightlifting Pavilion Dr. José Joaquín Puello in Santo Domingo, Dominican Republic. The event took place from September 30 to October 7, 2006.

== Medal summary ==
=== Men ===
Event	Gold		Silver		Bronze	
56 kg
Snatch	Li Zheng; China	128 kg	Hoàng Anh Tuấn; Vietnam	124 kg	Sergio Álvarez; Cuba	123 kg
Clean & Jerk	Sergio Álvarez; Cuba	156 kg	Lee Jong-hoon; South Korea	155 kg	Hoàng Anh Tuấn; Vietnam	152 kg
Total	Li Zheng; China	280 kg	Sergio Álvarez; Cuba	279 kg	Hoàng Anh Tuấn; Vietnam	276 kg
62 kg
Snatch	Qiu Le; China	140 kg	Óscar Figueroa; Colombia	137 kg	Israel José Rubio; Venezuela	133 kg
Clean & Jerk	Qiu Le; China	168 kg	Manuel Minginfel; Micronesia	165 kg	Diego Salazar; Colombia	164 kg
Total	Qiu Le; China	308 kg	Óscar Figueroa; Colombia	297 kg	Diego Salazar; Colombia	295 kg
69 kg
Snatch	Shi Zhiyong; China	150 kg	Mete Binay; Turkey	147 kg	Vencelas Dabaya; France	146 kg
Clean & Jerk	Vencelas Dabaya; France	186 kg	Armen Ghazaryan; Armenia	178 kg	Shi Zhiyong; China	177 kg
Total	Vencelas Dabaya; France	332 kg	Shi Zhiyong; China	327 kg	Demir Demirev; Bulgaria	318 kg
77 kg
Snatch	Li Hongli; China	167 kg	Taner Sağır; Turkey	166 kg	Ara Khachatryan; Armenia	165 kg
Clean & Jerk	Oleg Perepetchenov; Russia	198 kg	Vladislav Lukanin; Russia	197 kg	Taner Sağır; Turkey	195 kg
Total	Taner Sağır; Turkey	361 kg	Li Hongli; China	359 kg	Ara Khachatryan; Armenia	357 kg
85 kg
Snatch	Andrei Rybakou; Belarus	180 kg	Tigran Martirosyan; Armenia	172 kg	Aslanbek Ediev; Russia	172 kg
Clean & Jerk	Andrei Rybakou; Belarus	203 kg	Roman Khamatshin; Russia	203 kg	Aslanbek Ediev; Russia	201 kg
Total	Andrei Rybakou; Belarus	383 kg	Aslanbek Ediev; Russia	373 kg	Tigran Martirosyan; Armenia	370 kg
94 kg
Snatch	Roman Konstantinov; Russia	177 kg	Mukhamat Sozaev; Russia	176 kg	Ilya Ilyin; Kazakhstan	175 kg
Clean & Jerk	Szymon Kołecki; Poland	219 kg	Ilya Ilyin; Kazakhstan	217 kg	Yoandry Hernández; Cuba	216 kg
Total	Ilya Ilyin; Kazakhstan	392 kg	Szymon Kołecki; Poland	392 kg	Roman Konstantinov; Russia	392 kg
105 kg
Snatch	Dmitry Lapikov; Russia	194 kg	Marcin Dołęga; Poland	193 kg	Dmitry Klokov; Russia	188 kg
Clean & Jerk	Marcin Dołęga; Poland	222 kg	Dmitry Lapikov; Russia	220 kg	Robert Dołęga; Poland	219 kg
Total	Marcin Dołęga; Poland	415 kg	Dmitry Lapikov; Russia	414 kg	Dmitry Klokov; Russia	406 kg
+105 kg
Snatch	Hossein Rezazadeh; Iran	202 kg	Artem Udachyn; Ukraine	199 kg	Viktors Ščerbatihs; Latvia	198 kg
Clean & Jerk	Hossein Rezazadeh; Iran	246 kg	Dong Feng; China	245 kg	Mohamed Ihsan; Egypt	241 kg
Total	Hossein Rezazadeh; Iran	448 kg	Artem Udachyn; Ukraine	439 kg	Dong Feng; China	437 kg

=== Women ===
Event	Gold		Silver		Bronze	
48 kg
Snatch	Yang Lian; China	98 kg WR	Aree Wiratthaworn; Thailand	85 kg	Svetlana Ulyanova; Russia	83 kg
Clean & Jerk	Yang Lian; China	119 kg WR	Hiromi Miyake; Japan	108 kg	Svetlana Ulyanova; Russia	105 kg
Total	Yang Lian; China	217 kg WR	Aree Wiratthaworn; Thailand	188 kg	Hiromi Miyake; Japan	188 kg
53 kg
Snatch	Qiu Hongxia; China	98 kg	Raema Lisa Rumbewas; Indonesia	95 kg	Suda Chaleephay; Thailand	92 kg
Clean & Jerk	Qiu Hongxia; China	128 kg WR	Suda Chaleephay; Thailand	115 kg	Raema Lisa Rumbewas; Indonesia	115 kg
Total	Qiu Hongxia; China	226 kg WR	Raema Lisa Rumbewas; Indonesia	210 kg	Suda Chaleephay; Thailand	207 kg
58 kg
Snatch	Svetlana Tsarukaeva; Russia	108 kg	Qiu Hongmei; China	107 kg	Wandee Kameaim; Thailand	100 kg
Clean & Jerk	Wandee Kameaim; Thailand	130 kg	Qiu Hongmei; China	130 kg	Svetlana Tsarukaeva; Russia	125 kg
Total	Qiu Hongmei; China	237 kg	Svetlana Tsarukaeva; Russia	233 kg	Wandee Kameaim; Thailand	230 kg
63 kg
Snatch	Ouyang Xiaofang; China	110 kg	Svetlana Shimkova; Russia	108 kg	Meline Daluzyan; Armenia	105 kg
Clean & Jerk	Ouyang Xiaofang; China	136 kg	Svetlana Shimkova; Russia	133 kg	Meline Daluzyan; Armenia	127 kg
Total	Ouyang Xiaofang; China	246 kg	Svetlana Shimkova; Russia	241 kg	Meline Daluzyan; Armenia	232 kg
69 kg
Snatch	Oxana Slivenko; Russia	123 kg WR	Liu Chunhong; China	111 kg	Tatiana Matveeva; Russia	110 kg
Clean & Jerk	Oxana Slivenko; Russia	140 kg	Jeane Lassen; Canada	136 kg	Tatiana Matveeva; Russia	135 kg
Total	Oxana Slivenko; Russia	263 kg	Tatiana Matveeva; Russia	245 kg	Jeane Lassen; Canada	238 kg
75 kg
Snatch	Nadezhda Evstyukhina; Russia	122 kg	Cao Lei; China	118 kg	Nahla Ramadan; Egypt	115 kg
Clean & Jerk	Cao Lei; China	150 kg	Nadezhda Evstyukhina; Russia	145 kg	Zarema Kasaeva; Russia	136 kg
Total	Cao Lei; China	268 kg	Nadezhda Evstyukhina; Russia	267 kg	Zarema Kasaeva; Russia	246 kg
+75 kg
Snatch	Mu Shuangshuang; China	136 kg	Jang Mi-ran; South Korea	135 kg	Olha Korobka; Ukraine	127 kg
Clean & Jerk	Jang Mi-ran; South Korea	179 kg	Mu Shuangshuang; China	178 kg	Olha Korobka; Ukraine	157 kg
Total	Jang Mi-ran; South Korea	314 kg	Mu Shuangshuang; China	314 kg	Olha Korobka; Ukraine	284 kg

== Medal table ==
Ranking by Big (Total result) medals

Rank	Nation	Gold	Silver	Bronze	Total
1	China	7	3	1	11
2	Russia	1	6	3	10
3	Poland	1	1	0	2
4	Belarus	1	0	0	1
4	France	1	0	0	1
4	Iran	1	0	0	1
4	Kazakhstan	1	0	0	1
4	South Korea	1	0	0	1
4	Turkey	1	0	0	1
10	Thailand	0	1	2	3
11	Colombia	0	1	1	2
11	Ukraine	0	1	1	2
13	Cuba	0	1	0	1
13	Indonesia	0	1	0	1
15	Armenia	0	0	3	3
16	Bulgaria	0	0	1	1
16	Canada	0	0	1	1
16	Japan	0	0	1	1
16	Vietnam	0	0	1	1
Totals (19 entries)		15	15	15	45

Ranking by all medals: Big (Total result) and Small (Snatch and Clean & Jerk)

Rank	Nation	Gold	Silver	Bronze	Total
1	China	20	9	2	31
2	Russia	8	13	12	33
3	Poland	3	2	1	6
4	Belarus	3	0	0	3
4	Iran	3	0	0	3
6	South Korea	2	2	0	4
7	France	2	0	1	3
8	Thailand	1	3	4	8
9	Turkey	1	2	1	4
10	Cuba	1	1	2	4
11	Kazakhstan	1	1	1	3
12	Armenia	0	2	6	8
13	Ukraine	0	2	3	5
14	Colombia	0	2	2	4
15	Indonesia	0	2	1	3
16	Vietnam	0	1	2	3
17	Canada	0	1	1	2
17	Japan	0	1	1	2
19	Micronesia	0	1	0	1
20	Egypt	0	0	2	2
21	Bulgaria	0	0	1	1
21	Latvia	0	0	1	1
21	Venezuela	0	0	1	1
Totals (23 entries)		45	45	45	135

== Team ranking ==
=== Men ===
Rank	Team	Points
1	Russia	510
2	China	457
3	Poland	440
4	Cuba	414
5	Belarus	391
6	Colombia	355

=== Women ===
Rank	Team	Points
1	Russia	520
2	China	514
3	South Korea	437
4	Thailand	426
5	Colombia	342
6	Ukraine	341

== Participating nations ==
484 competitors from 64 nations participated.

- Albania (7)
- Armenia (8)
- Australia (4)
- Azerbaijan (7)
- Belarus (15)
- Belgium (1)
- Brazil (1)
- Bulgaria (15)
- Canada (13)
- Chile (9)
- China (15)
- Chinese Taipei (14)
- Colombia (15)
- Croatia (5)
- Cuba (8)
- Czech Republic (4)
- Dominican Republic (14)
- Ecuador (12)
- Egypt (10)
- El Salvador (3)
- Micronesia (1)
- France (15)
- Georgia (4)
- Germany (9)
- Great Britain (3)
- Greece (13)
- Hungary (15)
- Indonesia (6)
- Iran (1)
- Israel (1)
- Italy (15)
- Japan (15)
- Kazakhstan (15)
- Kyrgyzstan (3)
- Latvia (1)
- Lithuania (5)
- Macau (2)
- Mexico (6)
- Moldova (7)
- Nauru (2)
- Netherlands (1)
- Norway (1)
- Poland (15)
- Puerto Rico (4)
- Romania (6)
- Russia (15)
- Slovakia (6)
- South Africa (1)
- South Korea (15)
- Spain (15)
- Sweden (1)
- Switzerland (1)
- Syria (1)
- Thailand (15)
- Tunisia (1)
- Turkey (4)
- Turkmenistan (8)
- Uganda (1)
- Ukraine (15)
- United States (15)
- Uzbekistan (5)
- Venezuela (14)
- Vietnam (4)
- Wales (1)
