= Tara Cunningham =

American weightlifter (born 1972)

Personal information
- Born: May 10, 1972 (age 54) Del Rio, Texas, USA
- Height: 5 ft 1/2 in (154 cm)
- Weight: 106 lb (48 kg)

Sport
- Country: United States
- Sport: Weightlifting
Medal record
Olympic Games
Gold medal – first place	2000 Sydney	– 48 kg
Pan American Games
Gold medal – first place	1999 Winnipeg	– 48 kg
Gold medal – first place	2003 Santo Domingo	– 48 kg

Tara Nott-Cunningham (born Tara Nott; May 10, 1972) is an American former Olympic weightlifter who competed for the United States in both the 2000 and 2004 Olympic Games. She is the only athlete to have trained for three different sports at the United States Olympic Training Center (gymnastics, soccer, and weightlifting).

Born in Del Rio, Texas, Tara Nott grew up in Stilwell, Kansas. Her coaches were Mike Gattone and Bob Morris. She attended Blue Valley Middle and High Schools in Stilwell, KS and Colorado College in Colorado Springs, CO. She is married to free style wrestler Casey Cunningham.

In 2000, she became the first US weightlifter to win Olympic gold since Chuck Vinci in 1960, and the first US female weightlifter ever to win Olympic gold. The original gold medal winner, Bulgaria's Izabela Dragneva, was stripped of her gold after testing positive for furosemide, and the gold was awarded to Nott who initially placed second.

At the 2004 Summer Olympics, she ranked 10th in the 48 kg category.

She was inducted into the International Weightlifting Hall of Fame in 2015.

== Weightlifting achievements ==
- Senior National Champion (1996, 1997, 1999, 2000, 2002–2004)
- World Championships Team Member (1997–1999, 2003, 2004)
- Pan Am Games Champion (1999, 2003)
- Olympic Champion (2000)
- Olympic Games team member (2004)
- Multiple All-Time Senior American record holder in snatch, clean and jerk, and total
