= Aree Wiratthaworn =

Thai weightlifter (born 1980)

Medal record

Women's Weightlifting

Representing Thailand

Olympic Games
Bronze medal – third place	2004 Athens	– 48 kg

World Championships
Silver medal – second place	2006 Santo Domingo	– 48 kg
Bronze medal – third place	2005 Doha	– 48 kg

Aree Wiratthaworn TM, ChCh, ChBh, RChM

Military service
- Allegiance: Thailand
- Branch/service: Royal Thai Navy
- Rank: Lieutenant Commander

Aree Wiratthaworn (Thai: อารีย์ วิรัฐถาวร; born February 26, 1980) is a Thai weightlifter.

She competed in the women's 48 kg at the 2004 Summer Olympics and won the bronze medal with 200.0 kg in total.

At the 2005 World Weightlifting Championships she won the bronze medal in the 48 kg category.

At the 2006 World Weightlifting Championships she won the silver medal in the 48 kg category. She snatched 85 kg and clean and jerked an additional 103 kg for a total of 188 kg, 29 kg behind winner Yang.
