= Li Zhuo =

Chinese weightlifter (born 1981)

Personal information
- Born: December 4, 1981 (age 44)
Medal record
Women's Weightlifting
Representing China
Olympic Games
Silver medal – second place	2004 Athens	– 48 kg
Asian Games
Gold medal – first place	2002 Busan	– 48 kg

Li Zhuo (Chinese: 李卓; pinyin: Lǐ Zhuō; born December 4, 1981, in Tieling, Liaoning) is a Chinese weightlifter. She competed in the 2004 Summer Olympics, winning the silver medal in the 48 kg class.
