= Svetlana Ulyanova =

Russian weightlifter (born 1979)

Personal information
- Born: 29 August 1979 (age 46)
Medal record
Women's Weightlifting
Representing Russia
European Championships
Gold medal – first place	2003 Loutraki	– 48 kg
Gold medal – first place	2005 Sofia	– 48 kg
Silver medal – second place	2002 Antalya	– 48 kg
Silver medal – second place	2004 Kiev	– 48 kg
Silver medal – second place	2006 Vladyslavovo	– 48 kg
Bronze medal – third place	2007 Strasbourg	– 53 kg

Svetlana Ulyanova (born 29 August 1979) is a Russian weightlifter.

== Career ==
Ulyanova participated in the women's -48 kg class at the 2006 World Weightlifting Championships, but did not win a medal; however finished on an equal amount of lifted weight at the end of the competition alongside the silver and bronze medal winners. Yang Lian was outstanding lifting 29 kg more than the others. Wiratthaworn Aree (silver) and Hiromi Miyake (bronze) lifted 188 kg during the tournament. Ulyanova also lifted 188 kg, but as being the heaviest of the three (47.52 / 47.63 / 47.73 kg) did not receive a medal.
