= World record progression men's weightlifting (1998–2018) =

This is a list of world records progression in men's weightlifting from 1998 to 2018. These records are maintained in each weight class for the snatch lift, clean and jerk lift, and the total for both lifts.

The International Weightlifting Federation restructured its weight classes in 1998, nullifying earlier records and again in 2018.

== 56 kg ==
=== Snatch ===
Athlete	Record (kg)	Date	Meet	Place	Ref
World Standard	135.0	1 January 1998	—	—	
(Turkey) Halil Mutlu	135.5	14 April 1999	European Championships	A Coruña	
(Turkey) Halil Mutlu	136.0	22 November 1999	World Championships	Piraeus	
(Turkey) Halil Mutlu	137.5	22 November 1999	World Championships	Piraeus	
(Turkey) Halil Mutlu	138.0	16 September 2000	Olympic Games	Sydney	
(Turkey) Halil Mutlu	138.5	4 November 2001	World Championships	Antalya	
(China) Wu Jingbiao	139	21 November 2015	World Championships	Houston	

=== Clean & Jerk ===
Athlete	Record (kg)	Date	Meet	Place	Ref
World Standard	165.0	1 January 1998	—	—	
(China) Lan Shizhang	165.5	9 May 1998	Szekszárd Cup	Szekszárd	
(Turkey) Halil Mutlu	166.0	22 November 1999	World Championships	Piraeus	
(Turkey) Halil Mutlu	166.5	25 April 2000	European Championships	Sofia	
(Turkey) Halil Mutlu	167.5	16 September 2000	Olympic Games	Sydney	
(Turkey) Halil Mutlu	168.0	24 April 2001	European Championships	Trenčín	
(North Korea) Om Yun-chol	169	15 September 2013	Asian Interclub Championships	Pyongyang	
(North Korea) Om Yun-chol	170	20 September 2014	Asian Games	Incheon	
(North Korea) Om Yun-chol	171	21 November 2015	World Championships	Houston	

=== Total ===
Athlete	Record (kg)	Date	Meet	Place	Ref
World Standard	300.0	1 January 1998	—	—	
(Turkey) Halil Mutlu	302.5	22 November 1999	World Championships	Piraeus	
(Turkey) Halil Mutlu	305.0	16 September 2000	Olympic Games	Sydney	
(China) Long Qingquan	307	7 August 2016	Olympic Games	Rio de Janeiro	

== 62 kg ==
=== Snatch ===
Athlete	Record (kg)	Date	Meet	Place	Ref
World Standard	145.0	1 January 1998	—	—	
(Greece) Leonidas Sabanis	147.5	11 November 1998	World Championships	Lahti	
(China) Shi Zhiyong	148.0	4 July 1999	World Junior Championships	Savannah	
(China) Shi Zhiyong	150.0	4 July 1999	World Junior Championships	Savannah	
(China) Shi Zhiyong	152.5	3 May 2000	Asian Championships	Osaka	
(China) Shi Zhiyong	153.0	28 June 2002	World University Championships	İzmir	
(North Korea) Kim Un-guk	154	21 September 2014	Asian Games	Incheon	

=== Clean & Jerk ===
Athlete	Record (kg)	Date	Meet	Place	Ref
World Standard	180.0	1 January 1998	—	—	
(China) Le Maosheng	180.5	23 November 1999	World Championships	Piraeus	
(Belarus) Henadzi Aliashchuk	181.0	5 November 2001	World Championships	Antalya	
(China) Le Maosheng	182.5	2 October 2002	Asian Games	Busan	
(China) Chen Lijun	183	22 November 2015	World Championships	Houston	

=== Total ===
Athlete	Record (kg)	Date	Meet	Place	Ref
World Standard	325.0	1 January 1998	—	—	
(China) Zhang Jie	326	28 April 2008	Asian Championships	Kanazawa	
(North Korea) Kim Un-guk	327	30 July 2012	Olympic Games	London	
(North Korea) Kim Un-guk	328	21 September 2014	Asian Games	Incheon	
(North Korea) Kim Un-guk	332	21 September 2014	Asian Games	Incheon	
(China) Chen Lijun	333	22 November 2015	World Championships	Houston	

== 69 kg ==
=== Snatch ===
Athlete	Record (kg)	Date	Meet	Place	Ref
World Standard	157.5	1 January 1998	—	—	
(China) Wan Jianhui	158.0	12 November 1998	World Championships	Lahti	
(Bulgaria) Plamen Zhelyazkov	160.0	12 November 1998	World Championships	Lahti	
(Bulgaria) Galabin Boevski	160.5	24 November 1999	World Championships	Piraeus	
(Bulgaria) Galabin Boevski	162.5	24 November 1999	World Championships	Piraeus	
(Bulgaria) Georgi Markov	165.0	20 September 2000	Olympic Games	Sydney	
(China) Liao Hui	166	10 November 2014	World Championships	Almaty	

=== Clean & Jerk ===
Athlete	Record (kg)	Date	Meet	Place	Ref
World Standard	190.0	1 January 1998	—	—	
(South Korea) Kim Hak-bong	195.0	9 December 1998	Asian Games	Bangkok	
(Bulgaria) Galabin Boevski	196.0	24 November 1999	World Championships	Piraeus	
(Bulgaria) Galabin Boevski	196.5	20 September 2000	Olympic Games	Sydney	
(China) Zhang Guozheng	197.5	11 September 2003	Asian Championships	Qinhuangdao	
(China) Liao Hui ^{[c]}	~~198~~	21 September 2010	World Championships	Antalya	
(China) Liao Hui	198	23 October 2013	World Championships	Wrocław	

=== Total ===
Athlete	Record (kg)	Date	Meet	Place	Ref
World Standard	347.5	1 January 1998	—	—	
(Bulgaria) Plamen Zhelyazkov	350.0	12 November 1998	World Championships	Lahti	
(Bulgaria) Galabin Boevski	352.5	16 April 1999	European Championships	A Coruña	
(Bulgaria) Galabin Boevski	357.5	24 November 1999	World Championships	Piraeus	
(China) Liao Hui ^{[c]}	~~358~~	21 September 2010	World Championships	Antalya	
(China) Liao Hui	358	23 October 2013	World Championships	Wrocław	
(China) Liao Hui	359	10 November 2014	World Championships	Almaty	

== 77 kg ==
=== Snatch ===
Athlete	Record (kg)	Date	Meet	Place	Ref
World Standard	167.5	1 January 1998	—	—	
(Georgia (country)) Giorgi Asanidze	168.0	12 November 1998	World Championships	Lahti	
(Armenia) Khachatur Kyapanaktsyan	168.5	16 April 1999	European Championships	A Coruña	
(Bulgaria) Plamen Zhelyazkov	170.0	25 November 1999	World Championships	Piraeus	
(Armenia) Khachatur Kyapanaktsyan	170.5	25 November 1999	World Championships	Piraeus	
(Bulgaria) Plamen Zhelyazkov	172.5	27 March 2002	Qatar Grand Prix	Doha	
(Kazakhstan) Sergey Filimonov	173.0	4 October 2002	Asian Games	Busan	
(Kazakhstan) Sergey Filimonov	173.5	9 April 2004	Asian Championships	Almaty	
(China) Lü Xiaojun	174	24 November 2009	World Championships	Goyang	
(China) Lü Xiaojun	175	1 August 2012	Olympic Games	London	
(China) Lü Xiaojun	176	24 October 2013	World Championships	Wrocław	
(China) Lü Xiaojun	177	10 August 2016	Olympic Games	Rio de Janeiro	

=== Clean & Jerk ===
Athlete	Record (kg)	Date	Meet	Place	Ref
World Standard	205.0	1 January 1998	—	—	
(Cuba) Idalberto Aranda	205.5	5 August 1999	Pan American Games	Winnipeg	
(China) Zhan Xugang	206.0	2 September 1999	Asian Championships	Wuhan	
(Bulgaria) Zlatan Vanev	207.5	28 April 2000	European Championships	Sofia	
(Russia) Oleg Perepetchenov	210.0	27 April 2001	European Championships	Trenčín	
(Kazakhstan) Nijat Rahimov ^{[c]}	~~214~~	10 August 2016	Olympic Games	Rio de Janeiro	

=== Total ===
Athlete	Record (kg)	Date	Meet	Place	Ref
World Standard	372.5	1 January 1998	—	—	
(Russia) Oleg Perepetchenov	375.0	27 April 2001	European Championships	Trenčín	
(Bulgaria) Plamen Zhelyazkov	377.5	27 March 2002	Qatar Grand Prix	Doha	
(China) Lü Xiaojun	378	24 November 2009	World Championships	Goyang	
(China) Lü Xiaojun	379	1 August 2012	Olympic Games	London	
(China) Lü Xiaojun	380	24 October 2013	World Championships	Wrocław	

== 85 kg ==
=== Snatch ===
Athlete	Record (kg)	Date	Meet	Place	Ref
World Standard	177.5	1 January 1998	—	—	
(Greece) Pyrros Dimas	178.0	13 November 1998	World Championships	Lahti	
(Bulgaria) Georgi Gardev	180.0	17 April 1999	European Championships	A Coruña	
(Greece) Pyrros Dimas	180.5	26 November 1999	World Championships	Piraeus	
(Georgia (country)) Giorgi Asanidze	181.0	29 April 2000	European Championships	Sofia	
(Belarus) Andrei Rybakou	182.5	2 June 2002	World Junior Championships	Havířov	
(Belarus) Andrei Rybakou	183	14 November 2005	World Championships	Doha	
(Belarus) Andrei Rybakou	185	14 November 2005	World Championships	Doha	
(Belarus) Andrei Rybakou	186	6 May 2006	European Championships	Władysławowo	
(Belarus) Andrei Rybakou	187	22 September 2007	World Championships	Chiang Mai	

=== Clean & Jerk ===
Athlete	Record (kg)	Date	Meet	Place	Ref
World Standard	217.5	1 January 1998	—	—	
(China) Zhang Yong	218.0	25 April 1998	World University Championships	Ramat Gan	
(Iran) Kianoush Rostami	220	31 May 2016	Fajr Cup	Tehran	

=== Total ===
Athlete	Record (kg)	Date	Meet	Place	Ref
World Standard	395.0	1 January 1998	—	—	
(Belarus) Andrei Rybakou ^{[a]}	393	22 September 2007	World Championships	Chiang Mai	
(Belarus) Andrei Rybakou ^{[b]}	~~394~~	15 August 2008	Olympic Games	Beijing	
(China) Lu Yong ^{[b]}	394	15 August 2008	Olympic Games	Beijing	
(Iran) Kianoush Rostami	395	31 May 2016	Fajr Cup	Tehran	
(Iran) Kianoush Rostami	396	12 August 2016	Olympic Games	Rio de Janeiro	

== 94 kg ==
=== Snatch ===
Athlete	Record (kg)	Date	Meet	Place	Ref
World Standard	187.5	1 January 1998	—	—	
(Greece) Akakios Kakiasvilis	188.0	27 November 1999	World Championships	Piraeus	
(Iran) Sohrab Moradi	189	25 August 2018	Asian Games	Jakarta	

=== Clean & Jerk ===
Athlete	Record (kg)	Date	Meet	Place	Ref
World Standard	230.0	1 January 1998	—	—	
(Poland) Szymon Kołecki	232.5	29 April 2000	European Championships	Sofia	
(Kazakhstan) Ilya Ilyin ^{[c]}	~~233~~	4 August 2012	Olympic Games	London	
(Iran) Sohrab Moradi	233	3 December 2017	World Championships	Anaheim	

=== Total ===
Athlete	Record (kg)	Date	Meet	Place	Ref
World Standard	417.5	1 January 1998	—	—	
(Greece) Akakios Kakiasvilis ^{[a]}	412.5	27 November 1999	World Championships	Piraeus	
(Kazakhstan) Ilya Ilyin ^{[c]}	~~413~~	4 August 2012	Olympic Games	London	
(Kazakhstan) Ilya Ilyin ^{[c]}	~~418~~	4 August 2012	Olympic Games	London	
(Iran) Sohrab Moradi	413	23 September 2017	Asian Indoor & Martial Arts Games	Ashgabat	
(Iran) Sohrab Moradi	417	3 December 2017	World Championships	Anaheim	

== 105 kg ==
=== Snatch ===
Athlete	Record (kg)	Date	Meet	Place	Ref
World Standard	197.5	1 January 1998	—	—	
(Russia) Vladimir Smorchkov	198.0	10 November 2001	World Championships	Antalya	
(Poland) Marcin Dołęga	198.5	4 June 2002	World Junior Championships	Havířov	
(Poland) Marcin Dołęga	199	7 May 2006	European Championships	Władysławowo	
(Belarus) Andrei Aramnau	200	18 August 2008	Olympic Games	Beijing	

=== Clean & Jerk ===
Athlete	Record (kg)	Date	Meet	Place	Ref
World Standard	242.5	1 January 1998	—	—	
(Bulgaria) Alan Tsagaev ^{[a]}	237.5	25 April 2004	European Championships	Kyiv	
(Russia) David Bedzhanyan	238	17 December 2011	President's Cup	Belgorod	
(Uzbekistan) Ruslan Nurudinov	239	15 November 2014	World Championships	Almaty	
(Russia) David Bedzhanyan	240	15 November 2014	World Championships	Almaty	
(Kazakhstan) Ilya Ilyin	242	15 November 2014	World Championships	Almaty	
(Kazakhstan) Ilya Ilyin	246	12 December 2015	President's Cup	Grozny	

=== Total ===
Athlete	Record (kg)	Date	Meet	Place	Ref
World Standard	440.0	1 January 1998	—	—	
(Ukraine) Denys Hotfrid ^{[a]}	430.0	28 November 1999	World Championships	Piraeus	
(Belarus) Andrei Aramnau	436	18 August 2008	Olympic Games	Beijing	
(Kazakhstan) Ilya Ilyin	437	12 December 2015	President's Cup	Grozny	

== +105 kg ==
=== Snatch ===
Athlete	Record (kg)	Date	Meet	Place	Ref
World Standard	205.0	1 January 1998	—	—	
(Germany) Ronny Weller	205.5	3 May 1998	European Championships	Riesa	
(Iran) Hossein Rezazadeh	206.0	28 November 1999	World Championships	Piraeus	
(Armenia) Ashot Danielyan ^{[c]}	~~207.5~~	26 September 2000	Olympic Games	Sydney	
(Germany) Ronny Weller	210.0	26 September 2000	Olympic Games	Sydney	
(Iran) Hossein Rezazadeh	212.5	26 September 2000	Olympic Games	Sydney	
(Iran) Hossein Rezazadeh	213.0	14 September 2003	Asian Championships	Qinhuangdao	
(Iran) Behdad Salimi	214	13 November 2011	World Championships	Paris	
(Georgia (country)) Lasha Talakhadze	215	16 August 2016	Olympic Games	Rio de Janeiro	
(Iran) Behdad Salimi	216	16 August 2016	Olympic Games	Rio de Janeiro	
(Georgia (country)) Lasha Talakhadze	217	8 April 2017	European Championships	Split	
(Georgia (country)) Lasha Talakhadze	220	5 December 2017	World Championships	Anaheim	

=== Clean & Jerk ===
Athlete	Record (kg)	Date	Meet	Place	Ref
World Standard	262.5	1 January 1998	—	—	
(Iran) Hossein Rezazadeh	263.0	26 November 2002	World Championships	Warsaw	
(Iran) Hossein Rezazadeh	263.5	25 August 2004	Olympic Games	Piraeus	
(Russia) Aleksey Lovchev ^{[c]}	~~264~~	28 November 2015	World Championships	Houston	

=== Total ===
Athlete	Record (kg)	Date	Meet	Place	Ref
World Standard	462.5	1 January 1998	—	—	
(Germany) Ronny Weller	465.0	3 May 1998	European Championships	Riesa	
(Iran) Hossein Rezazadeh	467.5	26 September 2000	Olympic Games	Sydney	
(Iran) Hossein Rezazadeh	472.5	26 September 2000	Olympic Games	Sydney	
(Russia) Aleksey Lovchev ^{[c]}	~~475~~	28 November 2015	World Championships	Houston	
(Georgia (country)) Lasha Talakhadze	473	16 August 2016	Olympic Games	Rio de Janeiro	
(Georgia (country)) Lasha Talakhadze	477	5 December 2017	World Championships	Anaheim	

== Notes ==
- ^{a} Not a world record at the time of the competition, became a world record when IWF decided to eliminate the world standards from the list of World Records on 24 June 2008.
- ^{b} Andrei Rybakou's record of 394 kilograms from 15 August 2008 was rescinded on 26 October 2016 following disqualification for banned drug use; which could make Lu Yong the world record holder. By that time, however, it had been surpassed by Kianoush Rostami.
- ^{c} Rescinded for anti-doping violations.

== See also ==
- World record progression men's weightlifting
- World record progression women's weightlifting
- World record progression women's weightlifting (1998–2018)
- World record progression men's weightlifting (1993–1997)
