= 1999 World Weightlifting Championships – Men's 69 kg =

The Men's Lightweight Weightlifting Event (69 kg) is the third men's weight class event at the weightlifting competition, limited to competitors with a maximum of 69 kilograms of body mass. The competition at the 1999 World Weightlifting Championships took place in Athens, Greece on 24 November 1999.

Each lifter performed in both the snatch and clean and jerk lifts, with the final score being the sum of the lifter's best result in each. The athlete received three attempts in each of the two lifts; the score for the lift was the heaviest weight successfully lifted.

== Medalists ==
Event	Gold		Silver		Bronze	
Snatch	Galabin Boevski (BUL)	162.5 kg	Georgios Tzelilis (GRE)	155.0 kg	Valerios Leonidis (GRE)	152.5 kg
Clean & Jerk	Galabin Boevski (BUL)	195.0 kg	Georgios Tzelilis (GRE)	190.0 kg	Valerios Leonidis (GRE)	187.5 kg
Total	Galabin Boevski (BUL)	357.5 kg	Georgios Tzelilis (GRE)	345.0 kg	Valerios Leonidis (GRE)	340.0 kg

== Records ==
Prior to this competition, the existing world records were as follows.

World record	Snatch	Plamen Zhelyazkov (BUL)	160.0 kg	Lahti, Finland	12 November 1998
World record	Clean & jerk	Kim Hak-bong (KOR)	195.0 kg	Bangkok, Thailand	9 December 1998
World record	Total	Plamen Zhelyazkov (BUL)	352.5 kg	A Coruña, Spain	16 April 1999

== Results ==
Rank	Athlete	Body weight	Snatch (kg)				Clean & Jerk (kg)				Total
Rank	Athlete	Body weight	1	2	3	Rank	1	2	3	Rank	Total
1st place, gold medalist(s)	Galabin Boevski (BUL)	68.65	155.0	160.5	162.5	1st place, gold medalist(s)	185.0	190.0	196.0	1st place, gold medalist(s)	357.5
2nd place, silver medalist(s)	Georgios Tzelilis (GRE)	68.53	~~152.5~~	152.5	155.0	2nd place, silver medalist(s)	185.0	~~190.0~~	190.0	2nd place, silver medalist(s)	345.0
3rd place, bronze medalist(s)	Valerios Leonidis (GRE)	68.68	145.0	~~150.0~~	152.5	3rd place, bronze medalist(s)	~~187.5~~	187.5	~~192.5~~	3rd place, bronze medalist(s)	340.0
4	Marian Dodiță (ROM)	68.76	~~147.5~~	147.5	152.5	4	180.0	185.0	~~187.5~~	5	337.5
5	Zhang Guozheng (CHN)	68.90	~~150.0~~	150.0	~~155.0~~	8	180.0	187.5	~~190.0~~	4	337.5
6	Siarhei Laurenau (BLR)	68.62	145.0	150.0	~~155.0~~	6	170.0	177.5	182.5	6	332.5
7	Yasin Arslan (TUR)	68.32	145.0	~~150.0~~	150.0	5	177.5	180.0	~~182.5~~	8	330.0
8	Fadel Nasser Sarouf (QAT)	68.72	~~145.0~~	~~145.0~~	147.5	10	170.0	175.0	180.0	11	327.5
9	Rudik Petrosyan (ARM)	68.87	~~140.0~~	140.0	145.0	15	177.5	182.5	~~190.0~~	7	327.5
10	Kim Hak-bong (KOR)	68.67	140.0	145.0	~~150.0~~	13	180.0	~~187.5~~	~~187.5~~	10	325.0
11	Andrey Matveyev (RUS)	68.84	~~142.5~~	142.5	147.5	11	177.5	~~185.0~~	~~185.0~~	17	325.0
12	Israel Militosyan (ARM)	68.88	150.0	~~155.0~~	~~155.0~~	7	175.0	~~180.0~~	~~180.0~~	20	325.0
13	Kalman Szasz (ROM)	68.66	145.0	~~150.0~~	~~150.0~~	12	172.5	177.5	~~180.0~~	16	322.5
14	Turan Mirzayev (AZE)	68.76	137.5	142.5	~~145.0~~	16	175.0	180.0	~~185.0~~	12	322.5
15	Giuseppe Ficco (ITA)	68.99	~~135.0~~	135.0	140.0	20	175.0	180.0	~~182.5~~	14	320.0
16	François Demeure (BEL)	68.40	140.0	~~145.0~~	~~145.0~~	17	175.0	177.5	~~180.0~~	15	317.5
17	Yoshihisa Miyaji (JPN)	68.80	~~140.0~~	140.0	145.0	14	165.0	~~170.0~~	172.5	23	317.5
18	Javad Khoshdel (IRI)	68.92	~~140.0~~	140.0	~~145.0~~	19	172.5	~~177.5~~	177.5	18	317.5
19	Erwin Abdullah (INA)	68.32	~~135.0~~	135.0	~~140.0~~	23	170.0	175.0	180.0	9	315.0
20	Asif Malikov (AZE)	67.53	132.5	137.5	~~140.0~~	21	172.5	~~177.5~~	~~177.5~~	22	310.0
21	Rudolf Lukáč (SVK)	68.59	135.0	~~140.0~~	~~140.0~~	24	170.0	175.0	~~177.5~~	19	310.0
22	Armenak Takhmazian (DEN)	68.68	135.0	~~140.0~~	140.0	18	160.0	170.0	~~172.5~~	25	310.0
23	Ahmed Samir (EGY)	68.91	127.5	132.5	135.0	25	165.0	170.0	172.5	24	307.5
24	Fouad Bouzenada (ALG)	68.92	127.5	~~132.5~~	132.5	30	167.5	172.5	175.0	21	307.5
25	Mohammad Ali Falahatinejad (IRI)	68.93	130.0	135.0	~~137.5~~	26	170.0	~~177.5~~	~~177.5~~	28	305.0
26	Ulanbek Moldodosov (KGZ)	68.70	130.0	135.0	137.5	22	155.0	162.5	165.0	30	302.5
27	Johnny González (COL)	68.73	~~132.5~~	~~132.5~~	132.5	29	170.0	~~175.0~~	~~175.0~~	26	302.5
28	Heriberto Barbosa (COL)	68.73	132.5	~~137.5~~	~~137.5~~	28	170.0	~~175.0~~	~~175.0~~	27	302.5
29	Sébastien Groulx (CAN)	68.29	125.0	130.0	132.5	27	165.0	~~170.0~~	~~170.0~~	29	297.5
30	Abdelmanaane Yahiaoui (ALG)	68.60	~~125.0~~	125.0	130.0	31	162.5	—	—	31	292.5
31	Miroslav Janíček (SVK)	68.91	~~125.0~~	125.0	127.5	33	150.0	~~155.0~~	~~155.0~~	33	277.5
32	Lin Chieh-chin (TPE)	68.78	~~112.5~~	112.5	~~120.0~~	35	150.0	155.0	~~160.0~~	32	267.5
33	Darius Kiveris (LTU)	68.52	105.0	110.0	~~115.0~~	36	125.0	130.0	~~135.0~~	35	240.0
34	Francis Zarques (RSA)	67.82	97.5	~~105.0~~	105.0	37	117.5	122.5	130.0	34	235.0
35	Rik Kruisselbrink (NED)	68.79	95.0	100.0	~~105.0~~	38	117.5	125.0	~~130.0~~	36	225.0
36	James Power (IRL)	67.13	~~90.0~~	90.0	~~95.0~~	39	115.0	~~120.0~~	~~120.0~~	37	205.0
—	Faisal Abdulrahman Ahmed (QAT)	68.59	147.0	~~152.5~~	—	9	—	—	—	—	—
—	Samson Matam (FRA)	68.18	127.5	~~132.5~~	~~132.5~~	32	~~162.5~~	~~162.5~~	~~165.0~~	—	—
—	Björn Falkland (SWE)	68.91	~~122.5~~	122.5	~~127.5~~	34	~~155.0~~	~~155.0~~	~~155.0~~	—	—
—	Wan Jianhui (CHN)	68.87	~~152.5~~	~~152.5~~	~~152.5~~	—	180.0	~~187.5~~	~~187.5~~	13	—
—	Alexi Batista (PAN)	68.75	—	—	—	—	—	—	—	—	—

== New records ==
Snatch	160.5 kg	Galabin Boevski (BUL)	WR
Snatch	162.5 kg	Galabin Boevski (BUL)	WR
Clean & Jerk	196.0 kg	Galabin Boevski (BUL)	WR
Total	357.5 kg	Galabin Boevski (BUL)	WR
