= 1998 World Weightlifting Championships – Men's 69 kg =

The 1998 World Weightlifting Championships were held in Lahti, Finland from November 7 to November 15. The men's competition in the lightweight (69 kg) division was staged on 12 November 1998.

== Medalists ==
Event	Gold		Silver		Bronze	
Snatch	Plamen Zhelyazkov (BUL)	160.0 kg	Wan Jianhui (CHN)	157.5 kg	Georgios Tzelilis (GRE)	155.0 kg
Clean & Jerk	Plamen Zhelyazkov (BUL)	190.0 kg	Galabin Boevski (BUL)	185.0 kg	Valerios Leonidis (GRE)	185.0 kg
Total	Plamen Zhelyazkov (BUL)	350.0 kg	Georgios Tzelilis (GRE)	340.0 kg	Wan Jianhui (CHN)	340.0 kg

== Records ==
Prior to this competition, the existing world records were as follows.

World Record	Snatch	World Standard	157.5 kg	—	1 January 1998
World Record	Clean & Jerk	World Standard	190.0 kg	—	1 January 1998
World Record	Total	World Standard	347.5 kg	—	1 January 1998

== Results ==
Rank	Athlete	Body weight	Snatch (kg)				Clean & Jerk (kg)				Total
Rank	Athlete	Body weight	1	2	3	Rank	1	2	3	Rank	Total
1st place, gold medalist(s)	Plamen Zhelyazkov (BUL)	68.77	155.0	~~160.0~~	160.0	1st place, gold medalist(s)	182.5	187.5	190.0	1st place, gold medalist(s)	350.0
2nd place, silver medalist(s)	Georgios Tzelilis (GRE)	68.49	147.5	152.5	155.0	3rd place, bronze medalist(s)	185.0	~~190.0~~	~~190.0~~	4	340.0
3rd place, bronze medalist(s)	Wan Jianhui (CHN)	68.87	152.5	158.0	~~160.0~~	2nd place, silver medalist(s)	182.5	~~187.5~~	~~187.5~~	7	340.0
4	Galabin Boevski (BUL)	68.17	152.5	~~157.5~~	~~157.5~~	5	185.0	~~190.0~~	~~190.0~~	2nd place, silver medalist(s)	337.5
5	Valerios Leonidis (GRE)	68.21	~~147.5~~	147.5	150.0	7	~~185.0~~	185.0	~~190.0~~	3rd place, bronze medalist(s)	335.0
6	Andrey Matveyev (RUS)	68.74	137.5	142.5	147.5	10	175.0	~~180.0~~	185.0	6	332.5
7	Siarhei Laurenau (BLR)	68.64	145.0	150.0	155.0	4	170.0	175.0	~~180.0~~	12	330.0
8	Yang Cunkang (CHN)	68.71	140.0	~~145.0~~	145.0	12	180.0	185.0	~~187.5~~	5	330.0
9	Marian Dodiță (ROM)	68.42	147.5	~~152.5~~	~~152.5~~	9	~~175.0~~	175.0	~~180.0~~	11	322.5
10	François Demeure (BEL)	68.48	140.0	145.0	~~147.5~~	11	172.5	177.5	~~180.0~~	9	322.5
11	Ergün Batmaz (TUR)	68.89	~~145.0~~	145.0	~~150.0~~	14	170.0	177.5	—	10	322.5
12	Adrián Popa (HUN)	68.74	~~135.0~~	135.0	~~140.0~~	18	180.0	~~185.0~~	~~187.5~~	8	315.0
13	Yoshihisa Miyaji (JPN)	68.83	140.0	~~145.0~~	145.0	13	~~170.0~~	170.0	~~180.0~~	15	315.0
14	Sébastien Groulx (CAN)	68.13	125.0	130.0	132.5	21	162.5	167.5	170.0	13	302.5
15	Turan Mirzayev (AZE)	68.38	~~132.5~~	132.5	~~140.0~~	22	170.0	~~175.0~~	~~175.0~~	14	302.5
16	Giuseppe Ficco (ITA)	68.72	127.5	132.5	135.0	17	167.5	~~172.5~~	~~172.5~~	17	302.5
17	Werner Höller (AUT)	68.58	132.5	~~137.5~~	137.5	16	162.5	~~167.5~~	~~167.5~~	20	300.0
18	Ahmed Samir (EGY)	68.77	125.0	130.0	135.0	20	165.0	~~170.0~~	~~172.5~~	18	300.0
19	Heriberto Barbosa (COL)	68.42	125.0	130.0	~~132.5~~	23	162.5	167.5	~~172.5~~	16	297.5
20	Fouad Bouzenada (ALG)	68.91	120.0	125.0	~~127.5~~	27	160.0	~~165.0~~	165.0	19	290.0
21	Yosri Shalaly (EGY)	68.45	120.0	125.0	~~130.0~~	25	155.0	160.0	~~165.0~~	21	285.0
22	Alexi Batista (PAN)	67.58	120.0	125.0	~~130.0~~	24	~~150.0~~	~~150.0~~	150.0	22	275.0
23	Andrejs Vituks (LAT)	68.74	120.0	~~125.0~~	125.0	26	145.0	150.0	~~152.5~~	23	275.0
24	Petr Stanislav (CZE)	68.38	120.0	~~125.0~~	~~125.0~~	28	145.0	~~150.0~~	~~150.0~~	24	265.0
25	Dionisio Rozalina (NED)	68.82	115.0	~~120.0~~	~~120.0~~	30	~~140.0~~	140.0	145.0	25	260.0
26	Kassim Mulindwa (UGA)	68.79	115.0	115.0	—	29	130.0	~~135.0~~	—	26	245.0
—	Fedail Güler (TUR)	68.12	145.0	150.0	~~152.5~~	6	~~185.0~~	~~187.5~~	—	—	—
—	Gábor Molnár (HUN)	68.64	145.0	150.0	~~155.0~~	8	~~175.0~~	~~175.0~~	~~175.0~~	—	—
—	Ramzan Musayev (AZE)	68.30	~~140.0~~	140.0	~~147.5~~	15	~~177.5~~	~~177.5~~	~~177.5~~	—	—
—	Romuald Ernault (FRA)	68.74	132.5	~~135.0~~	~~135.0~~	19	~~160.0~~	~~160.0~~	~~162.5~~	—	—
—	Armenak Takhmazian (DEN)	68.32	—	—	—	—	—	—	—	—	—

== New records ==
Snatch	158.0 kg	Wan Jianhui (CHN)	WR
Snatch	160.0 kg	Plamen Zhelyazkov (BUL)	WR
Total	350.0 kg	Plamen Zhelyazkov (BUL)	WR
