= Weightlifting at the 2002 Asian Games – Men's 69 kg =

Men's 69 kg at the 2002 Asian Games
- Venue: Pukyong National University Gymnasium
- Date: 3 October 2002
- Competitors: 13 from 12 nations

Medalists
gold medal	Zhang Guozheng	China
silver medal	Erwin Abdullah	Indonesia
bronze medal	Mehdi Panzvan	Iran

The men's 69 kilograms event at the 2002 Asian Games took place on October 3, 2002 at Pukyong National University Gymnasium.

== Schedule ==
All times are Korea Standard Time (UTC+09:00)

Date	Time	Event
Thursday, 3 October 2002	18:00	Group A

== Records ==
Prior to this competition, the existing world, Asian and Games records were as follows.

World Record	Snatch	Georgi Markov (BUL)	165.0 kg	Sydney, Australia	20 September 2000
World Record	Clean & Jerk	Galabin Boevski (BUL)	196.5 kg	Sydney, Australia	20 September 2000
World Record	Total	Galabin Boevski (BUL)	357.5 kg	Athens, Greece	24 November 1999
Asian Record	Snatch	Wan Jianhui (CHN)	158.0 kg	Lahti, Finland	12 November 1998
Asian Record	Clean & Jerk	Kim Hak-bong (KOR)	195.0 kg	Bangkok, Thailand	9 December 1998
Asian Record	Total	Wan Jianhui (CHN)	342.5 kg	Wuhan, China	31 August 1999
Games Record	Snatch	Wan Jianhui (CHN)	155.0 kg	Bangkok, Thailand	9 December 1998
Games Record	Clean & Jerk	Kim Hak-bong (KOR)	195.0 kg	Bangkok, Thailand	9 December 1998
Games Record	Total	Wan Jianhui (CHN)	340.0 kg	Bangkok, Thailand	9 December 1998

== Results ==
Legend

- NM — No mark

Rank	Athlete	Body weight	Snatch (kg)				Clean & Jerk (kg)				Total
Rank	Athlete	Body weight	1	2	3	Result	1	2	3	Result	Total
1st place, gold medalist(s)	Zhang Guozheng (CHN)	68.85	150.0	155.0	~~160.0~~	155.0	185.0	190.0	~~197.5~~	190.0	345.0
2nd place, silver medalist(s)	Erwin Abdullah (INA)	68.15	~~142.5~~	142.5	~~147.5~~	142.5	185.0	~~190.0~~	190.0	190.0	332.5
3rd place, bronze medalist(s)	Mehdi Panzvan (IRI)	68.00	~~145.0~~	145.0	150.0	150.0	175.0	~~180.0~~	~~180.0~~	175.0	325.0
4	Fadel Nasser Sarouf (QAT)	68.60	~~150.0~~	150.0	155.0	155.0	170.0	~~180.0~~	~~180.0~~	170.0	325.0
5	Alexandr Okhremenko (KAZ)	68.50	~~135.0~~	135.0	142.5	142.5	170.0	175.0	~~182.5~~	175.0	317.5
6	Sukhrob Raupov (UZB)	69.00	135.0	140.0	145.0	145.0	160.0	170.0	~~175.0~~	170.0	315.0
7	Manas Alibaev (KGZ)	68.25	137.5	~~142.5~~	~~142.5~~	137.5	155.0	160.0	165.0	165.0	302.5
8	Makhmudjon Togoev (UZB)	68.25	125.0	~~132.5~~	~~135.0~~	125.0	150.0	~~160.0~~	~~160.0~~	150.0	275.0
9	Nyamlkhagvaagiin Ganbaatar (MGL)	68.85	110.0	115.0	117.5	117.5	~~135.0~~	135.0	~~140.0~~	135.0	252.5
10	Furas Wegdan (YEM)	67.30	~~100.0~~	100.0	~~110.0~~	100.0	130.0	~~135.0~~	~~137.5~~	130.0	230.0
11	Jasim Al-Nahham (BRN)	68.45	100.0	~~110.0~~	~~110.0~~	100.0	120.0	125.0	~~130.0~~	125.0	225.0
—	Lee Bae-young (KOR)	68.80	145.0	150.0	~~152.5~~	150.0	~~185.0~~	~~185.0~~	~~185.0~~	—	NM
—	Kuo Cheng-wei (TPE)	68.45	~~132.5~~	132.5	~~135.0~~	132.5	~~162.5~~	~~162.5~~	~~162.5~~	—	NM

== New records ==
The following records were established during the competition.

Total	345.0	Zhang Guozheng (CHN)	AR
