= 2001 World Weightlifting Championships – Men's 69 kg =

The 2001 World Weightlifting Championships were held in Antalya, Turkey from November 4 to November 11. The men's competition in the lightweight (69 kg) division was staged on 6 November 2001.

== Medalists ==
Event	Gold		Silver		Bronze	
Snatch	Reyhan Arabacıoğlu (TUR)	155.0 kg	Yasin Arslan (TUR)	150.0 kg	Georgios Tzelilis (GRE)	150.0 kg
Clean & Jerk	Galabin Boevski (BUL)	190.0 kg	Georgios Tzelilis (GRE)	185.0 kg	Andrey Matveyev (RUS)	182.5 kg
Total	Galabin Boevski (BUL)	340.0 kg	Georgios Tzelilis (GRE)	335.0 kg	Reyhan Arabacıoğlu (TUR)	335.0 kg

== Records ==
Prior to this competition, the existing world records were as follows.

World Record	Snatch	Georgi Markov (BUL)	165.0 kg	Sydney, Australia	20 September 2000
World Record	Clean & Jerk	Galabin Boevski (BUL)	196.5 kg	Sydney, Australia	20 September 2000
World Record	Total	Galabin Boevski (BUL)	357.5 kg	Athens, Greece	24 November 1999

== Results ==
Rank	Athlete	Body weight	Snatch (kg)				Clean & Jerk (kg)				Total
Rank	Athlete	Body weight	1	2	3	Rank	1	2	3	Rank	Total
1st place, gold medalist(s)	Galabin Boevski (BUL)	68.78	150.0	~~155.0~~	~~157.5~~	6	180.0	187.5	190.0	1st place, gold medalist(s)	340.0
2nd place, silver medalist(s)	Georgios Tzelilis (GRE)	68.42	145.0	150.0	~~152.5~~	3rd place, bronze medalist(s)	180.0	185.0	~~187.5~~	2nd place, silver medalist(s)	335.0
3rd place, bronze medalist(s)	Reyhan Arabacıoğlu (TUR)	68.62	150.0	155.0	~~157.5~~	1st place, gold medalist(s)	180.0	~~185.0~~	~~185.0~~	5	335.0
4	Andrey Matveyev (RUS)	68.68	140.0	145.0	~~150.0~~	11	177.5	182.5	~~187.5~~	3rd place, bronze medalist(s)	327.5
5	Yasin Arslan (TUR)	68.24	145.0	150.0	~~152.5~~	2nd place, silver medalist(s)	~~175.0~~	175.0	~~180.0~~	8	325.0
6	Mohamed El-Tantawy (EGY)	68.52	140.0	145.0	~~147.5~~	9	175.0	~~180.0~~	180.0	4	325.0
7	Turan Mirzayev (AZE)	68.70	142.5	147.5	~~152.5~~	7	177.5	~~185.0~~	~~185.0~~	7	325.0
8	Wu Jinxing (CHN)	68.50	145.0	150.0	~~152.5~~	4	165.0	~~172.5~~	172.5	11	322.5
9	Rudik Petrosyan (ARM)	68.84	142.5	147.5	~~152.5~~	8	175.0	~~182.5~~	~~185.0~~	10	322.5
10	Varazdat Vasilyan (ARM)	68.54	135.0	142.5	145.0	10	175.0	~~182.5~~	~~185.0~~	9	320.0
11	Fadel Nasser Sarouf (QAT)	68.62	140.0	150.0	~~152.5~~	5	170.0	~~180.0~~	~~180.0~~	13	320.0
12	Vencelas Dabaya (CMR)	67.96	132.5	137.5	~~140.0~~	12	172.5	177.5	—	6	315.0
13	Rudolf Lukáč (SVK)	68.90	~~132.5~~	132.5	137.5	13	~~167.5~~	~~167.5~~	172.5	12	310.0
14	Samson Matam (FRA)	68.52	130.0	~~135.0~~	135.0	15	~~167.5~~	167.5	~~172.5~~	14	302.5
15	Felix Ekpo (NGR)	68.44	130.0	~~135.0~~	135.0	14	160.0	165.0	~~170.0~~	15	300.0
16	Beiman Palacios (COL)	68.44	~~127.5~~	127.5	~~132.5~~	17	160.0	165.0	~~170.0~~	16	292.5
17	Renato Sulkja (ALB)	68.28	130.0	~~135.0~~	~~135.0~~	16	160.0	~~165.0~~	~~165.0~~	17	290.0
18	Sébastien Groulx (CAN)	67.62	120.0	125.0	~~127.5~~	18	155.0	~~160.0~~	~~160.0~~	18	280.0
19	Stewart Cruickshank (GBR)	68.84	~~125.0~~	125.0	~~130.0~~	19	150.0	~~155.0~~	~~155.0~~	19	275.0
20	John Lubin (GBR)	68.94	107.5	~~112.5~~	112.5	20	137.5	~~142.5~~	~~142.5~~	20	250.0
—	Fouad Bouzenada (ALG)	68.86	~~130.0~~	~~130.0~~	—	—	—	—	—	—	—
—	Zoltán Farkas (HUN)	68.36	—	—	—	—	—	—	—	—	—
