= 1997 World Weightlifting Championships – Men's 70 kg =

The 1997 World Weightlifting Championships were held in Chiang Mai, Thailand from December 6 to December 14. The men's competition in the 70 kg division was staged on 9 December 1997.

== Medalists ==
| Event | Gold | | Silver | | Bronze | |
|---|---|---|---|---|---|---|
| Snatch | Zlatan Vanev (BUL) | 160.0 kg | Zhan Xugang (CHN) | 157.5 kg | Wan Jianhui (CHN) | 155.0 kg |
| Clean & Jerk | Zlatan Vanev (BUL) | 195.0 kg | Zhan Xugang (CHN) | 195.0 kg | Kim Hak-bong (KOR) | 185.0 kg |
| Total | Zlatan Vanev (BUL) | 355.0 kg | Zhan Xugang (CHN) | 352.5 kg | Wan Jianhui (CHN) | 340.0 kg |

== Records ==
Prior to this competition, the existing world records were as follows.

| World record | Snatch | Wan Jianhui (CHN) | 163.0 kg | Yangzhou, China | 9 July 1997 |
| World record | Clean & jerk | Zhan Xugang (CHN) | 195.0 kg | Atlanta, United States | 23 July 1996 |
| World record | Total | Zhan Xugang (CHN) | 357.5 kg | Atlanta, United States | 23 July 1996 |

== Results ==
| Rank | Athlete | Body weight | Snatch (kg) | | | | Clean & Jerk (kg) | | | | Total |
| Rank | Athlete | Body weight | 1 | 2 | 3 | Rank | 1 | 2 | 3 | Rank | Total |
|---|---|---|---|---|---|---|---|---|---|---|---|
| 1st place, gold medalist(s) | Zlatan Vanev (BUL) | 69.70 | 152.5 | 157.5 | 160.0 | 1st place, gold medalist(s) | 187.5 | 192.5 | 195.0 | 1st place, gold medalist(s) | 355.0 |
| 2nd place, silver medalist(s) | Zhan Xugang (CHN) | 69.95 | ~~155.0~~ | ~~155.0~~ | 157.5 | 2nd place, silver medalist(s) | 190.0 | 195.5 | ~~197.5~~ | 2nd place, silver medalist(s) | 352.5 |
| 3rd place, bronze medalist(s) | Wan Jianhui (CHN) | 69.65 | 152.5 | 155.0 | ~~157.5~~ | 3rd place, bronze medalist(s) | 185.0 | ~~187.5~~ | ~~187.5~~ | 4 | 340.0 |
| 4 | Ergün Batmaz (TUR) | 69.85 | 150.0 | ~~155.0~~ | ~~155.0~~ | 4 | 180.0 | ~~187.5~~ | — | 6 | 330.0 |
| 5 | Kim Hak-bong (KOR) | 69.35 | ~~135.0~~ | 135.0 | ~~140.0~~ | 10 | 180.0 | 185.0 | ~~190.0~~ | 3rd place, bronze medalist(s) | 320.0 |
| 6 | Werner Höller (AUT) | 68.35 | ~~140.0~~ | 140.0 | 145.0 | 5 | 165.0 | ~~170.0~~ | 170.0 | 11 | 315.0 |
| 7 | Yasin Arslan (TUR) | 69.10 | 135.0 | 140.0 | 142.5 | 6 | 165.0 | 170.0 | ~~172.5~~ | 12 | 312.5 |
| 8 | Rudolf Lukáč (SVK) | 69.50 | 135.0 | 140.0 | ~~142.5~~ | 7 | 172.5 | ~~177.5~~ | ~~177.5~~ | 9 | 312.5 |
| 9 | Adrián Popa (HUN) | 69.75 | 135.0 | ~~140.0~~ | ~~140.0~~ | 12 | 177.5 | ~~182.5~~ | ~~182.5~~ | 7 | 312.5 |
| 10 | François Demeure (BEL) | 69.50 | ~~137.5~~ | 137.5 | ~~142.5~~ | 8 | 170.0 | 172.5 | — | 10 | 310.0 |
| 11 | Ahmed Samir (EGY) | 69.45 | 127.5 | ~~132.5~~ | ~~132.5~~ | 13 | 165.0 | 170.0 | 175.0 | 8 | 302.5 |
| 12 | Alexander Ignatovski (ISR) | 69.55 | 130.0 | 135.0 | 137.5 | 9 | 155.0 | 162.5 | ~~165.0~~ | 13 | 300.0 |
| 13 | Armenak Takhmazian (DEN) | 69.50 | 130.0 | 135.0 | ~~140.0~~ | 11 | 152.5 | ~~160.0~~ | ~~160.0~~ | 16 | 287.5 |
| 14 | Sébastien Groulx (CAN) | 67.90 | 120.0 | ~~125.0~~ | ~~125.0~~ | 15 | 155.0 | ~~160.0~~ | ~~160.0~~ | 14 | 275.0 |
| 15 | Duncan Van Rooyen (AUS) | 69.20 | 120.0 | ~~125.0~~ | ~~125.0~~ | 16 | 150.0 | ~~155.0~~ | 155.0 | 15 | 275.0 |
| 16 | Dionisio Rozalina (NED) | 69.15 | 112.5 | 117.5 | ~~122.5~~ | 17 | 145.0 | 150.0 | ~~155.0~~ | 17 | 267.5 |
| 17 | Redjean Clerc (SUI) | 69.95 | 117.5 | ~~122.5~~ | ~~122.5~~ | 18 | 145.0 | 150.0 | ~~152.5~~ | 19 | 267.5 |
| — | Hsu Ying-hsi (TPE) | 70.00 | 115.0 | 122.5 | ~~125.0~~ | 14 | ~~152.5~~ | ~~152.5~~ | ~~152.5~~ | — | — |
| — | Serghei Cretu (MDA) | 69.75 | ~~140.0~~ | ~~140.0~~ | ~~140.0~~ | — | 170.0 | 175.0 | 180.0 | 5 | — |
| — | Aekarat Sukhumalchan (THA) | 69.85 | ~~120.0~~ | ~~120.0~~ | ~~120.0~~ | — | 150.0 | ~~160.0~~ | ~~160.0~~ | 18 | — |
| — | Abdelmanaane Yahiaoui (ALG) | 68.35 | ~~135.0~~ | ~~135.0~~ | ~~135.0~~ | — | — | — | — | — | — |
| DQ | Kim Myong-nam (PRK) | 69.70 | 155.0 | ~~157.5~~ | ~~157.5~~ | — | ~~185.0~~ | ~~185.0~~ | — | — | — |

== New records ==
| Clean & Jerk | 195.5 kg | Zhan Xugang (CHN) | WR |
