= Weightlifting at the 1998 Asian Games – Men's 69 kg =

Men's 69 kg at the 1998 Asian Games
- Venue: Thunder Dome
- Date: 9 December 1998
- Competitors: 13 from 12 nations

Medalists
gold medal	Kim Hak-bong	South Korea
silver medal	Wan Jianhui	China
bronze medal	Kim Myong-jung	North Korea

The men's 69 kilograms event at the 1998 Asian Games took place on 9 December 1998 at Thunder Dome, Maung Thong Thani Sports Complex.

The weightlifter from South Korea won the gold, with a combined lift of 340 kilograms.

Total score was the sum of the lifter's best result in each of the snatch and the clean and jerk, with three lifts allowed for each lift. In case of a tie, the lighter lifter won; if still tied, the lifter who took the fewest attempts to achieve the total score won. Lifters without a valid snatch score were allowed to perform the clean and jerk.

== Results ==
Legend

- NM — No mark

Rank	Athlete	Body weight	Snatch (kg)				Clean & Jerk (kg)				Total
Rank	Athlete	Body weight	1	2	3	Result	1	2	3	Result	Total
1st place, gold medalist(s)	Kim Hak-bong (KOR)	68.70	140.0	~~145.0~~	145.0	145.0	~~180.0~~	180.0	195.0	195.0	340.0
2nd place, silver medalist(s)	Wan Jianhui (CHN)	68.95	150.0	155.0	~~157.5~~	155.0	180.0	185.0	~~195.0~~	185.0	340.0
3rd place, bronze medalist(s)	Kim Myong-jung (PRK)	68.20	135.0	~~140.0~~	140.0	140.0	167.5	172.5	~~185.0~~	172.5	312.5
4	Yoshihisa Miyaji (JPN)	69.00	140.0	~~145.0~~	~~145.0~~	140.0	167.5	~~172.5~~	172.5	172.5	312.5
5	Erwin Abdullah (INA)	67.80	132.5	137.5	~~140.0~~	137.5	165.0	172.5	~~180.0~~	172.5	310.0
6	Nodir Suleimanov (UZB)	68.35	135.0	~~140.0~~	~~140.0~~	135.0	167.5	172.5	~~177.5~~	172.5	307.5
7	Vassiliy Pozyomin (KAZ)	68.65	~~140.0~~	140.0	142.5	142.5	~~165.0~~	~~165.0~~	165.0	165.0	307.5
8	Suriya Dadtuyawat (THA)	67.80	115.0	120.0	~~125.0~~	120.0	160.0	~~165.0~~	170.0	170.0	290.0
9	Asen Ikromov (KGZ)	68.60	125.0	130.0	~~135.0~~	130.0	~~150.0~~	150.0	160.0	160.0	290.0
10	Mohd Hidayat Hamidon (MAS)	68.70	120.0	~~127.5~~	~~127.5~~	120.0	150.0	~~160.0~~	160.0	160.0	280.0
11	Amnat Khamma (THA)	67.95	110.0	120.0	~~122.5~~	120.0	145.0	150.0	155.0	155.0	275.0
12	Awais Akbar (PAK)	66.20	120.0	~~125.0~~	125.0	125.0	140.0	~~145.0~~	~~145.0~~	140.0	265.0
—	Hsu Ying-hsi (TPE)	69.00	~~120.0~~	~~120.0~~	~~120.0~~	—	—	—	—	—	NM

== New records ==
The following records were established during the competition.

Clean & Jerk	195.0	Kim Hak-bong (KOR)	WR
