= Weightlifting at the 2004 Summer Olympics – Men's 69 kg =

Weightlifting at the Olympics

Men's 69 kg at the Games of the XXVIII Olympiad
- Venue: Nikaia Olympic Weightlifting Hall
- Date: 18 August 2004
- Competitors: 17 from 16 nations

Medalists
1st place, gold medalist(s)		Zhang Guozheng	China
2nd place, silver medalist(s)		Lee Bae-young	South Korea
3rd place, bronze medalist(s)		Nikolaj Pešalov	Croatia

The men's 69 kilograms weightlifting event at the 2004 Summer Olympics in Athens, Greece took place at the Nikaia Olympic Weightlifting Hall on 18 August.

Total score was the sum of the lifter's best result in each of the snatch and the clean and jerk, with three lifts allowed for each lift. In case of a tie, the lighter lifter won; if still tied, the lifter who took the fewest attempts to achieve the total score won. Lifters without a valid snatch score did not perform the clean and jerk.

== Schedule ==
All times are Eastern European Summer Time (UTC+03:00)

Date	Time	Event
18 August 2004	10:30	Group B
18 August 2004	20:00	Group A

== Records ==
{{{caption}}}
World Record	Snatch	Georgi Markov (BUL)	165.0 kg	Sydney, Australia	20 September 2000
World Record	Clean & Jerk	Zhang Guozheng (CHN)	197.5 kg	Qinhuangdao, China	11 September 2003
World Record	Total	Galabin Boevski (BUL)	357.5 kg	Athens, Greece	24 November 1999
Olympic Record	Snatch	Georgi Markov (BUL)	165.0 kg	Sydney, Australia	20 September 2000
Olympic Record	Clean & Jerk	Galabin Boevski (BUL)	195.0 kg	Sydney, Australia	20 September 2000
Olympic Record	Total	Galabin Boevski (BUL)	357.5 kg	Sydney, Australia	20 September 2000

== Results ==
Rank	Athlete	Group	Body weight	Snatch (kg)				Clean & Jerk (kg)				Total
Rank	Athlete	Group	Body weight	1	2	3	Result	1	2	3	Result	Total
1st place, gold medalist(s)	Zhang Guozheng (CHN)	A	68.74	152.5	157.5	160.0	160.0	187.5	~~192.5~~	~~192.5~~	187.5	347.5
2nd place, silver medalist(s)	Lee Bae-young (KOR)	A	68.43	147.5	~~152.5~~	152.5	152.5	185.0	190.0	~~195.0~~	190.0	342.5
3rd place, bronze medalist(s)	Nikolaj Pešalov (CRO)	A	68.07	~~150.0~~	150.0	~~155.0~~	150.0	182.5	187.5	~~192.5~~	187.5	337.5
4	Turan Mirzayev (AZE)	A	68.80	147.5	~~152.5~~	~~152.5~~	147.5	180.0	185.0	~~190.0~~	185.0	332.5
5	Vencelas Dabaya (CMR)	A	67.94	140.0	145.0	~~147.5~~	145.0	182.5	~~187.5~~	~~192.5~~	182.5	327.5
6	Siarhei Laurenau (BLR)	A	68.89	147.5	~~152.5~~	~~152.5~~	147.5	~~170.0~~	~~170.0~~	170.0	170.0	317.5
7	Romuald Ernault (FRA)	B	68.63	142.5	~~147.5~~	~~147.5~~	142.5	165.0	~~170.0~~	~~170.0~~	165.0	307.5
8	Yukio Peter (NRU)	B	68.71	130.0	135.0	~~137.5~~	135.0	167.5	~~175.0~~	—	167.5	302.5
9	Stănel Stoica (ROM)	B	68.96	135.0	140.0	142.5	142.5	160.0	~~167.5~~	~~167.5~~	160.0	302.5
10	Kuo Cheng-wei (TPE)	B	68.84	132.5	~~135.0~~	~~135.0~~	132.5	~~165.0~~	165.0	~~170.0~~	165.0	297.5
11	Julio Idrovo (ECU)	B	68.31	135.0	140.0	~~142.5~~	140.0	150.0	155.0	~~160.0~~	155.0	295.0
12	Abdulmohsen Al-Bagir (KSA)	B	68.54	127.5	~~132.5~~	~~135.0~~	127.5	155.0	~~160.0~~	160.0	160.0	287.5
—	Jafar Al-Bagir (KSA)	B	68.63	~~135.0~~	~~135.0~~	~~135.0~~	—	—	—	—	—	—
—	Miroslav Janíček (SVK)	B	68.98	~~125.0~~	125.0	~~130.0~~	125.0	~~155.0~~	~~155.0~~	~~155.0~~	—	—
—	Mehdi Panzvan (IRI)	A	68.01	147.5	~~152.5~~	~~152.5~~	147.5	~~172.5~~	~~172.5~~	~~172.5~~	—	—
—	Suriya Dadtuyawat (THA)	B	68.07	137.5	~~142.5~~	~~142.5~~	137.5	—	—	—	—	—
—	Youssef Sbai (TUN)	A	68.41	~~147.5~~	~~147.5~~	~~147.5~~	—	—	—	—	—	—
