= Weightlifting at the 2000 Summer Olympics – Men's 69 kg =

Weightlifting at the Olympics

Men's 69 kg at the Games of the XXVII Olympiad
- Venue: Sydney Convention and Exhibition Centre
- Date: 20 September 2000
- Competitors: 17 from 14 nations

Medalists
1st place, gold medalist(s)		Galabin Boevski	Bulgaria
2nd place, silver medalist(s)		Georgi Markov	Bulgaria
3rd place, bronze medalist(s)		Siarhei Laurenau	Belarus

The men's 69 kilograms weightlifting event at the 2000 Summer Olympics in Sydney, Australia took place at the Sydney Convention and Exhibition Centre on September 20.

Total score was the sum of the lifter's best result in each of the snatch and the clean and jerk, with three lifts allowed for each lift. In case of a tie, the lighter lifter won; if still tied, the lifter who took the fewest attempts to achieve the total score won. Lifters without a valid snatch score did not perform the clean and jerk.

== Schedule ==
All times are Australian Eastern Time (UTC+10:00)

Date	Time	Event
20 September 2000	10:30	Group B
20 September 2000	18:30	Group A

== Records ==
{{{caption}}}
World Record	Snatch	Galabin Boevski (BUL)	162.5 kg	Athens, Greece	24 November 1999
World Record	Clean & Jerk	Galabin Boevski (BUL)	196.0 kg	Athens, Greece	24 November 1999
World Record	Total	Galabin Boevski (BUL)	357.5 kg	Athens, Greece	24 November 1999
Olympic Record	Snatch	Olympic Standard	162.5 kg	—	1 January 1997
Olympic Record	Clean & Jerk	Olympic Standard	192.5 kg	—	1 January 1997
Olympic Record	Total	Olympic Standard	355.0 kg	—	1 January 1997

== Results ==
Rank	Athlete	Group	Body weight	Snatch (kg)				Clean & Jerk (kg)				Total
Rank	Athlete	Group	Body weight	1	2	3	Result	1	2	3	Result	Total
1st place, gold medalist(s)	Galabin Boevski (BUL)	A	68.78	155.0	160.0	162.5	162.5	185.0	190.0	196.5	195.0	357.5
2nd place, silver medalist(s)	Georgi Markov (BUL)	A	68.92	155.0	160.0	165.0	165.0	182.5	187.5	~~192.5~~	187.5	352.5
3rd place, bronze medalist(s)	Siarhei Laurenau (BLR)	A	68.42	152.5	157.5	~~163.0~~	157.5	182.5	~~187.5~~	~~187.5~~	182.5	340.0
4	Zhang Guozheng (CHN)	A	68.64	~~150.0~~	150.0	152.5	152.5	~~185.0~~	185.0	~~190.0~~	185.0	337.5
5	Rudik Petrosyan (ARM)	A	68.84	142.5	147.5	~~150.0~~	147.5	182.5	187.5	~~192.5~~	187.5	335.0
6	Valerios Leonidis (GRE)	A	68.40	145.0	~~150.0~~	~~150.0~~	145.0	~~185.0~~	~~185.0~~	185.0	185.0	330.0
7	Lee Bae-young (KOR)	A	68.64	~~142.5~~	142.5	~~147.5~~	142.5	180.0	~~187.5~~	187.5	187.5	330.0
8	Kim Hak-bong (KOR)	A	68.84	142.5	147.5	~~150.0~~	147.5	~~180.0~~	~~182.5~~	182.5	182.5	330.0
9	Turan Mirzayev (AZE)	B	68.50	140.0	145.0	147.5	147.5	175.0	180.0	~~182.5~~	180.0	327.5
10	Youssef Sbai (TUN)	B	68.48	140.0	~~142.5~~	142.5	142.5	172.5	177.5	~~180.0~~	177.5	320.0
11	Yoshihisa Miyaji (JPN)	B	68.92	~~145.0~~	145.0	150.0	150.0	170.0	~~175.0~~	~~175.0~~	170.0	320.0
12	François Demeure (BEL)	B	68.58	~~140.0~~	140.0	~~145.0~~	140.0	170.0	~~175.0~~	~~175.0~~	170.0	310.0
13	Giuseppe Ficco (ITA)	B	68.92	127.5	~~132.5~~	132.5	132.5	165.0	170.0	—	170.0	302.5
14	Yasin Arslan (TUR)	B	68.20	130.0	135.0	~~137.5~~	135.0	160.0	165.0	~~170.0~~	165.0	300.0
15	Sébastien Groulx (CAN)	B	68.30	125.0	130.0	~~132.5~~	130.0	160.0	167.5	~~172.5~~	167.5	297.5
16	Alexi Batista (PAN)	B	68.48	~~112.5~~	~~112.5~~	112.5	112.5	~~130.0~~	~~130.0~~	130.0	130.0	242.5
—	Wan Jianhui (CHN)	A	68.98	~~147.5~~	147.5	~~150.0~~	147.5	~~180.0~~	~~180.0~~	~~180.0~~	—	—

== New records ==
Snatch	165.0 kg	Georgi Markov (BUL)	WR
Clean & Jerk	196.5 kg	Galabin Boevski (BUL)	WR
Total	357.5 kg	Galabin Boevski (BUL)	OR
