= Ernault =

Ernault is a French surname. Notable people with the surname include:

- Nicolas Ernault des Bruslys (1757–1809), French general and governor of Île Bonaparte
- Romuald Ernault (born 1977), French weightlifter
