= Thanh Nguyen =

Thanh Nguyen may refer to:

- Tan Duc Thanh Nguyen, Vietnamese–Australian citizen convicted in Indonesia for drug trafficking
- Thanh Nguyen (weightlifter), American weightlifter
- Viet Thanh Nguyen, Vietnamese-American novelist
