= Adrian Popa =

Adrian Popa may refer to:

- Adrian Popa (footballer, born 1988), Romanian footballer who plays as a winger/midfielder
- Adrian Popa (footballer, born 1990), Romanian footballer who plays as a defender
- Adrián Popa, Hungarian weightlifter
