= Weightlifting at the 1996 Summer Olympics – Men's 70 kg =

Weightlifting at the Olympics

Men's 70 kg at the Games of the XXVI Olympiad
- Venue: Georgia World Congress Center
- Date: 23 July 1996
- Competitors: 27 from 22 nations
- Winning total: 357.5 kg

Medalists
1st place, gold medalist(s)		Zhan Xugang	China
2nd place, silver medalist(s)		Kim Myong-nam	North Korea
3rd place, bronze medalist(s)		Attila Feri	Hungary

These are the results of the men's 70 kg competition in weightlifting at the 1996 Summer Olympics in Atlanta. A total of 28 athletes entered this event. The weightlifter from China won the gold, with a combined lift of 357.5 kg.

== Results ==
Each weightlifter had three attempts for both the snatch and clean and jerk lifting methods. The total of the best successful lift of each method was used to determine the final rankings and medal winners.

Rank	Athlete	Group	Body weight	Snatch (kg)				Clean & Jerk (kg)				Total
Rank	Athlete	Group	Body weight	1	2	3	Result	1	2	3	Result	Total
1st place, gold medalist(s)	Zhan Xugang (CHN)	A	69.98	155.0	160.0	162.5	162.5	190.0	~~192.5~~	195.0	195.0	357.5
2nd place, silver medalist(s)	Kim Myong-nam (PRK)	A	69.79	~~160.0~~	~~160.0~~	160.0	160.0	185.0	~~192.5~~	~~192.5~~	185.0	345.0
3rd place, bronze medalist(s)	Attila Feri (HUN)	A	69.20	~~152.5~~	152.5	~~155.0~~	152.5	~~187.5~~	187.5	~~192.5~~	187.5	340.0
4	Plamen Zhelyazkov (BUL)	A	69.61	~~150.0~~	150.0	155.0	155.0	180.0	~~185.0~~	~~185.0~~	180.0	335.0
5	Abdel Manaane Yahiaoui (ALG)	B	69.62	145.0	150.0	~~152.5~~	150.0	180.0	185.0	~~187.5~~	185.0	335.0
6	Israel Militosyan (ARM)	A	69.88	~~150.0~~	152.5	~~155.0~~	152.5	177.5	182.5	~~187.5~~	182.5	335.0
7	Wan Jianhui (CHN)	A	69.50	~~152.5~~	152.5	~~155.0~~	152.5	180.0	~~185.0~~	~~185.0~~	180.0	332.5
8	Idalberto Aranda (CUB)	A	69.84	137.5	142.5	145.0	145.0	187.5	~~192.5~~	~~192.5~~	187.5	332.5
9	Zlatan Vasilev (BUL)	A	69.31	150.0	~~155.0~~	~~155.0~~	150.0	180.0	~~185.0~~	~~185.0~~	180.0	330.0
10	Andreas Behm (GER)	A	69.39	142.5	147.5	~~150.0~~	147.5	180.0	~~187.5~~	~~187.5~~	180.0	327.5
11	Ergun Batmaz (TUR)	A	69.55	150.0	~~155.0~~	~~155.0~~	150.0	175.0	~~182.5~~	–	175.0	325.0
12	Hayk Yeghiazaryan (ARM)	A	69.86	~~145.0~~	145.0	~~150.0~~	145.0	180.0	~~190.0~~	~~190.0~~	180.0	325.0
13	Christos Spyrou (GRE)	B	69.51	140.0	145.0	~~150.0~~	145.0	172.5	177.5	~~180.0~~	177.5	322.5
14	Tim McRae (USA)	B	69.86	137.5	142.5	145.0	145.0	172.5	~~177.5~~	177.5	177.5	322.5
15	Oleksiy Khizhniak (UKR)	B	69.94	142.5	~~147.5~~	~~147.5~~	142.5	172.5	177.5	~~182.5~~	177.5	320.0
16	Serghei Cretu (MDA)	B	69.68	~~137.5~~	137.5	142.5	142.5	172.5	~~177.5~~	~~177.5~~	172.5	315.0
17	Jouni Grönman (FIN)	B	69.56	135.0	140.0	142.5	142.5	165.0	170.0	~~175.0~~	170.0	312.5
18	Mojisola Oluwa (NGR)	C	69.84	135.0	140.0	~~142.5~~	140.0	165.0	~~170.0~~	170.0	170.0	310.0
19	Noriaki Horikoshi (JPN)	B	69.22	132.5	137.5	~~140.0~~	137.5	170.0	~~175.0~~	~~175.0~~	170.0	307.5
20	Rudolf Lukáč (SVK)	C	69.38	135.0	~~140.0~~	~~140.0~~	135.0	167.5	~~177.5~~	~~177.5~~	167.5	302.5
21	André Aldenhov (SWE)	B	69.83	~~135.0~~	135.0	~~140.0~~	135.0	165.0	~~172.5~~	~~172.5~~	165.0	300.0
22	Abdalla Al-Sebaei (SYR)	C	69.89	130.0	~~135.0~~	~~135.0~~	130.0	~~160.0~~	~~160.0~~	160.0	160.0	290.0
23	Samsudeen Kabeer (IND)	C	69.75	115.0	120.0	125.0	125.0	140.0	145.0	150.0	150.0	275.0
24	Marcelo Gandolfo (ARG)	C	69.05	115.0	120.0	~~125.0~~	120.0	140.0	~~150.0~~	~~150.0~~	140.0	260.0
	Fedail Guler (TUR)	A	69.96	–	–	–	–	–	–	–	–	–
	Peter Kilapa (PNG)	C	69.22	~~115.0~~	115.0	120.0	120.0	~~150.0~~	~~155.0~~	~~155.0~~	–	–
	Gabriel Lemme (ARG)	B	69.39	~~135.0~~	~~135.0~~	~~135.0~~	–	–	–	–	–	–
	Gábor Molnár (HUN)	B	69.44	~~145.0~~	~~145.0~~	~~145.0~~	–	–	–	–	–	–

== See also ==
- 1998 World Weightlifting Championships - Men's 69 kg

== Sources ==
- "Official Olympic Report". International Olympic Committee. Archived from the original on 12 June 2007.
