= Fouad Bouzenada =

Algerian weightlifter

Personal information
- Full name: Fouad Bouzenada
- Born: 9 August 1976 (age 49)
- Weight: 76.42 kg (168.5 lb)

Sport
- Country: Algeria
- Sport: Weightlifting
- Weight class: 77 kg
- Team: National team
- Updated on 13 September 2016

Fouad Bouzenada (فؤاد بوزنادة; born 9 August 1976) is an Algerian male weightlifter, competing in the 77 kg category and representing Algeria at international competitions. He participated at the 1996 Summer Olympics in the 64 kg event. He competed at world championships, most recently at the 2003 World Weightlifting Championships.

== Major results ==
Year	Venue	Weight	Snatch (kg)				Clean & Jerk (kg)				Total	Rank
Year	Venue	Weight	1	2	3	Rank	1	2	3	Rank	Total	Rank
Summer Olympics
1996	Atlanta, United States	64 kg				—N/a				—N/a		29
World Championships
2003	Vancouver, Canada	77 kg	130	~~135~~	~~135~~	25	170	~~175~~	---	24	300	21
2001	Antalya, Turkey	69 kg	~~130~~	~~130~~	---	---	---	---	---	---	0	---
1999	Piraeus, Greece	69 kg	127.5	~~132.5~~	132.5	30	167.5	172.5	175	21	307.5	24
1998	Lahti, Finland	69 kg	120	125	~~127.5~~	27	160	~~165~~	165	19	290	20
