= Alexi Batista =

Panamanian weightlifter

Personal information
- Full name: Alexi Batista
- Born: 4 January 1976 (age 50)
- Height: 156 cm (5 ft 1 in)
- Weight: 68.75 kg (151.6 lb)

Sport
- Country: Panama
- Sport: Weightlifting
- Weight class: 69 kg
- Team: National team
Medal record
Representing Panama
Pan American Games
Bronze medal – third place	1999 Winnipeg	-69kg
- Updated on 2 October 2016

Alexi Batista sometimes written as Alexis Batista (born 4 January 1976) is a Panamanian male weightlifter. He represented Panama at international competitions. He participated at the 1996 Summer Olympics in the 64 kg event and at the 2000 Summer Olympics in the 69 kg event. He competed at world championships, most recently at the 1999 World Weightlifting Championships.

== Major results ==
Year	Venue	Weight	Snatch (kg)				Clean & Jerk (kg)				Total	Rank
Year	Venue	Weight	1	2	3	Rank	1	2	3	Rank	Total	Rank
Summer Olympics
2000	Sydney, Australia	69 kg				—N/a				—N/a		16
1996	Atlanta, United States	64 kg				—N/a				—N/a		27
World Championships
1999	Piraeus, Greece	69 kg	---	---	---	---	---	---	---	---	0	---
1998	Lahti, Finland	69 kg	120	125	~~130~~	24	~~150~~	~~150~~	150	22	275	22
