= 2003 World Weightlifting Championships – Men's 77 kg =

The 2003 World Weightlifting Championships were held in Vancouver, Canada, from 14 November to 22 November. The men's 77 kilograms division was staged on 17 and 18 November.

== Schedule ==
Date	Time	Event
17 November 2003	13:30	Group D
17 November 2003	17:30	Group C
18 November 2003	15:00	Group B
18 November 2003	20:00	Group A

== Medalists ==
Event	Gold		Silver		Bronze	
Snatch	Li Hongli (CHN)	162.5 kg	Vyacheslav Yershov (RUS)	162.5 kg	Reyhan Arabacıoğlu (TUR)	160.0 kg
Clean & Jerk	Mohammad Ali Falahatinejad (IRI)	202.5 kg	Mehmet Yılmaz (TUR)	195.0 kg	Reyhan Arabacıoğlu (TUR)	195.0 kg
Total	Mohammad Ali Falahatinejad (IRI)	357.5 kg	Reyhan Arabacıoğlu (TUR)	355.0 kg	Li Hongli (CHN)	352.5 kg

== Records ==
Prior to this competition, the existing world records were as follows.

World record	Snatch	Sergey Filimonov (KAZ)	173.0 kg	Busan, South Korea	4 October 2002
World record	Clean & jerk	Oleg Perepetchenov (RUS)	210.0 kg	Trenčín, Slovakia	27 April 2001
World record	Total	Plamen Zhelyazkov (BUL)	377.5 kg	Doha, Qatar	27 March 2002

== Results ==
Rank	Athlete	Group	Body weight	Snatch (kg)				Clean & Jerk (kg)				Total
Rank	Athlete	Group	Body weight	1	2	3	Rank	1	2	3	Rank	Total
1st place, gold medalist(s)	Mohammad Ali Falahatinejad (IRI)	A	76.55	150.0	155.0	~~157.5~~	7	197.5	202.5	~~210.5~~	1st place, gold medalist(s)	357.5
2nd place, silver medalist(s)	Reyhan Arabacıoğlu (TUR)	A	76.32	160.0	~~165.0~~	~~165.0~~	3rd place, bronze medalist(s)	195.0	~~197.5~~	~~197.5~~	3rd place, bronze medalist(s)	355.0
3rd place, bronze medalist(s)	Li Hongli (CHN)	A	76.13	162.5	~~167.5~~	~~167.5~~	1st place, gold medalist(s)	~~190.0~~	~~190.0~~	190.0	4	352.5
4	Plamen Zhelyazkov (BUL)	A	76.81	~~160.0~~	~~160.0~~	160.0	5	190.0	~~195.0~~	~~197.5~~	6	350.0
5	Oleksandr Cherpak (UKR)	B	76.97	155.0	~~160.0~~	160.0	6	185.0	190.0	~~195.0~~	8	350.0
6	Vyacheslav Yershov (RUS)	A	76.44	~~162.5~~	162.5	~~165.0~~	2nd place, silver medalist(s)	~~182.5~~	182.5	~~187.5~~	15	345.0
7	Sebastian Dogariu (ROM)	B	76.63	152.5	~~157.5~~	~~157.5~~	12	~~182.5~~	182.5	187.5	9	340.0
8	Rudolf Lukáč (SVK)	B	76.40	142.5	~~147.5~~	147.5	19	185.0	190.0	~~195.0~~	5	337.5
9	Vladimir Bîrsa (MDA)	C	76.46	150.0	~~152.5~~	152.5	10	180.0	185.0	~~187.5~~	12	337.5
10	Ingo Steinhöfel (GER)	B	76.51	145.0	150.0	152.5	11	180.0	185.0	~~187.5~~	13	337.5
11	Gaber Mohamed (EGY)	B	76.83	145.0	~~150.0~~	150.0	16	180.0	182.5	187.5	10	337.5
12	Vasile Hegheduș (ROM)	B	76.82	147.5	152.5	~~155.0~~	13	182.5	~~187.5~~	~~187.5~~	16	335.0
13	René Hoch (GER)	B	75.77	142.5	147.5	~~150.0~~	17	180.0	185.0	~~192.5~~	11	332.5
14	Nader Sufyan Abbas (QAT)	B	76.30	150.0	~~152.5~~	152.5	9	180.0	~~185.0~~	~~185.0~~	17	332.5
15	Octavio Mejías (VEN)	C	76.50	145.0	150.0	~~152.5~~	14	175.0	180.0	~~185.0~~	18	330.0
16	Gennadiy Yermakov (KAZ)	B	76.55	145.0	150.0	~~152.5~~	15	175.0	180.0	~~182.5~~	19	330.0
17	Janusz Czaban (FRA)	C	75.97	142.5	147.5	~~150.0~~	18	177.5	~~182.5~~	~~182.5~~	20	325.0
18	Carlos Andica (COL)	C	76.46	140.0	145.0	~~147.5~~	20	175.0	~~180.0~~	~~180.0~~	22	320.0
19	Ferney Manzano (COL)	C	76.51	140.0	~~145.0~~	~~145.0~~	21	~~177.5~~	177.5	~~180.0~~	21	317.5
20	Armiche Arvelo (ESP)	D	76.45	~~135.0~~	135.0	~~140.0~~	23	160.0	167.5	~~175.0~~	26	302.5
21	Fouad Bouzenada (ALG)	C	76.42	130.0	~~135.0~~	~~135.0~~	25	170.0	~~175.0~~	—	24	300.0
22	Tsai Chun-nan (TPE)	D	76.43	125.0	130.0	~~135.0~~	26	170.0	~~175.0~~	~~175.0~~	25	300.0
23	Alexis Demers-Marcil (CAN)	D	76.94	127.5	~~132.5~~	132.5	24	150.0	155.0	160.0	27	292.5
24	Claude Caouette (CAN)	D	76.80	120.0	~~125.0~~	125.0	27	~~140.0~~	140.0	~~145.0~~	28	265.0
25	Nurgeldi Gorganow (TKM)	D	76.86	120.0	~~125.0~~	~~125.0~~	28	140.0	~~145.0~~	—	29	260.0
—	Kim Kwang-hoon (KOR)	A	74.31	~~150.0~~	~~150.0~~	~~150.0~~	—	—	—	—	—	—
—	Makhmudjon Togoev (UZB)	C	75.69	~~140.0~~	~~140.0~~	~~140.0~~	—	170.0	~~175.0~~	~~180.0~~	23	—
—	Mehmet Yılmaz (TUR)	A	76.13	~~160.0~~	~~160.0~~	~~160.0~~	—	~~190.0~~	195.0	~~197.5~~	2nd place, silver medalist(s)	—
—	Greg Schouten (USA)	D	76.43	135.0	~~140.0~~	~~140.0~~	22	~~160.0~~	~~160.0~~	~~160.0~~	—	—
—	Mohammad Hossein Barkhah (IRI)	A	76.69	160.0	~~165.0~~	—	4	—	—	—	—	—
—	János Baranyai (HUN)	C	76.72	~~142.5~~	~~142.5~~	~~142.5~~	—	—	—	—	—	—
—	Sergey Filimonov (KAZ)	A	76.72	~~162.5~~	~~162.5~~	~~162.5~~	—	~~190.0~~	~~190.0~~	~~190.0~~	—	—
—	Sergio Mannironi (ITA)	C	76.79	~~142.5~~	~~142.5~~	~~142.5~~	—	—	—	—	—	—
—	Chad Vaughn (USA)	B	76.81	~~142.5~~	~~142.5~~	~~142.5~~	—	180.0	~~185.0~~	185.0	14	—
—	Zhan Xugang (CHN)	A	76.84	~~155.0~~	155.0	~~160.0~~	8	~~195.0~~	~~195.0~~	~~195.0~~	—	——
—	Arsen Melikyan (ARM)	A	76.65	~~162.5~~	~~162.5~~	~~162.5~~	—	190.0	~~197.5~~	—	7	—
—	Artan Suli (ALB)	C	76.96	~~140.0~~	~~140.0~~	~~140.0~~	—	—	—	—	—	—
DQ	Gevorg Davtyan (ARM)	A	76.09	160.0	~~165.0~~	~~165.0~~	—	190.5	195.0	~~197.5~~	—	—
