= Weightlifting at the 1996 Summer Olympics – Men's 64 kg =

Weightlifting at the Olympics

Men's 64 kg at the Games of the XXVI Olympiad
- Venue: Georgia World Congress Center
- Date: 22 July 1996
- Competitors: 36 from 26 nations
- Winning total: 335.0 kg

Medalists
1st place, gold medalist(s)		Naim Süleymanoğlu	Turkey
2nd place, silver medalist(s)		Valerios Leonidis	Greece
3rd place, bronze medalist(s)		Xiao Jiangang	China

These are the results of the men's 64 kg competition in weightlifting at the 1996 Summer Olympics in Atlanta. A total of 36 athletes competed in the event. Winning the gold medal, Turkey's Naim Süleymanoğlu became the first weightlifter in history to win three consecutive Olympic titles.

== Results ==
Each weightlifter had three attempts for both the snatch and clean and jerk lifting methods. The total of the best successful lift of each method was used to determine the final rankings and medal winners.

Rank	Athlete	Group	Body weight	Snatch (kg)				Clean & Jerk (kg)				Total
Rank	Athlete	Group	Body weight	1	2	3	Result	1	2	3	Result	Total
1st place, gold medalist(s)	Naim Süleymanoğlu (TUR)	A	63.90	145.0	~~147.5~~	147.5	147.5	180.0	185.0	187.5	187.5	335.0
2nd place, silver medalist(s)	Valerios Leonidis (GRE)	A	63.22	140.0	145.0	~~147.5~~	145.0	180.0	187.5	~~190.0~~	187.5	332.5
3rd place, bronze medalist(s)	Xiao Jiangang (CHN)	A	63.15	140.0	~~145.0~~	145.0	145.0	170.0	~~177.5~~	177.5	177.5	322.5
4	Georgios Tzelilis (GRE)	A	63.50	137.5	142.5	145.0	145.0	172.5	177.5	~~180.0~~	177.5	322.5
5	Adrián Popa (HUN)	A	63.93	130.0	135.0	~~137.5~~	135.0	167.5	~~172.5~~	172.5	172.5	307.5
6	Ilian Iliev (BUL)	A	63.90	~~137.5~~	137.5	142.5	142.5	162.5	~~167.5~~	~~167.5~~	162.5	305.0
7	Mücahit Yağci (TUR)	B	63.46	130.0	135.0	~~137.5~~	135.0	162.5	167.5	~~170.0~~	167.5	302.5
8	Zoltán Kecskés (HUN)	A	63.60	130.0	135.0	~~137.5~~	135.0	162.5	167.5	~~170.0~~	167.5	302.5
9	Petar Petrov (BUL)	A	63.68	140.0	~~145.0~~	~~145.0~~	140.0	160.0	~~165.0~~	~~165.0~~	160.0	300.0
10	Yoshihisa Miyaji (JPN)	B	63.63	135.0	140.0	~~142.5~~	140.0	152.5	~~157.5~~	157.5	157.5	297.5
11	Umar Edelkhanov (RUS)	B	63.90	132.5	~~137.5~~	~~137.5~~	132.5	~~162.5~~	~~162.5~~	162.5	162.5	295.0
12	Eduard Darbinyan (ARM)	A	63.61	~~132.5~~	~~132.5~~	132.5	132.5	~~160.0~~	160.0	~~167.5~~	160.0	292.5
13	Hwang Hui-yeol (KOR)	A	63.88	127.5	~~132.5~~	132.5	132.5	~~157.5~~	160.0	~~162.5~~	160.0	292.5
14	Liao Hsing-Chou (TPE)	B	63.74	125.0	~~130.0~~	~~130.0~~	125.0	160.0	165.0	~~167.5~~	165.0	290.0
15	Masato Tachibana (JPN)	B	63.63	125.0	~~130.0~~	~~130.0~~	125.0	155.0	162.5	~~165.0~~	162.5	287.5
16	Aleksandr Okhramenko (KAZ)	C	63.65	~~122.5~~	122.5	127.5	127.5	155.0	160.0	~~165.0~~	160.0	287.5
17	Vladimir Popov (MDA)	B	63.74	125.0	130.0	~~135.0~~	130.0	157.5	~~162.5~~	–	157.5	287.5
18	Marius Cihărean (ROU)	B	63.90	~~130.0~~	~~130.0~~	130.0	130.0	~~155.0~~	155.0	~~160.0~~	155.0	285.0
19	Lucian Maxinianu (ROU)	B	63.74	130.0	~~140.0~~	~~140.0~~	130.0	155.0	~~160.0~~	~~160.0~~	155.0	285.0
20	Gustavo Majauskas (ARG)	C	63.99	120.0	~~125.0~~	125.0	125.0	155.0	~~160.0~~	160.0	160.0	285.0
21	Wojciech Natusiewicz (POL)	B	63.62	~~122.5~~	122.5	~~125.0~~	122.5	160.0	~~165.0~~	~~165.0~~	160.0	282.5
22	Vernon Patao (USA)	C	64.00	~~122.5~~	122.5	~~127.5~~	122.5	150.0	155.0	160.0	160.0	282.5
23	Oleg Yem (KAZ)	C	63.59	125.0	~~130.0~~	130.0	130.0	145.0	150.0	~~155.0~~	150.0	280.0
24	Azzedine Basbas (ALG)	B	63.76	120.0	~~125.0~~	~~125.0~~	120.0	~~160.0~~	~~160.0~~	160.0	160.0	280.0
25	Samson N'Dicka-Matam (CMR)	B	63.95	125.0	~~130.0~~	~~130.0~~	125.0	155.0	~~165.0~~	~~165.0~~	155.0	280.0
26	Roger Berrio (COL)	C	63.63	120.0	~~122.5~~	122.5	122.5	~~150.0~~	150.0	155.0	155.0	277.5
27	Alexi Batista (PAN)	B	63.87	~~122.5~~	122.5	~~130.0~~	122.5	150.0	~~160.0~~	~~160.0~~	150.0	272.5
28	Jean Lavertue (CAN)	C	63.92	~~125.0~~	~~125.0~~	125.0	125.0	145.0	~~150.0~~	~~152.5~~	145.0	270.0
29	Fouad Bouzenada (ALG)	C	63.98	115.0	~~120.0~~	~~120.0~~	115.0	147.5	~~152.5~~	152.5	152.5	267.5
30	Alfonso Grullart (DOM)	C	63.79	~~115.0~~	~~115.0~~	115.0	115.0	~~145.0~~	145.0	~~152.5~~	145.0	260.0
31	Francisco Cáceres (ESA)	C	64.00	~~115.0~~	115.0	~~120.0~~	115.0	145.0	~~150.0~~	~~150.0~~	145.0	260.0
32	Thanh Nguyen (USA)	C	63.93	112.5	~~117.5~~	~~117.5~~	112.5	145.0	~~150.0~~	~~150.0~~	145.0	257.5
33	Sandeep Kumar (IND)	C	63.57	105.0	110.0	~~115.0~~	110.0	135.0	142.5	~~147.5~~	142.5	252.5
34	Miodrag Kovačić (YUG)	C	63.90	102.5	110.0	~~112.5~~	110.0	130.0	137.5	~~140.0~~	137.5	247.5
	Tony Analau (SOL)	C	61.87	~~80.0~~	~~80.0~~	~~80.0~~	–	–	–	–	–	–
	Wang Guohua (CHN)	A	63.45	~~145.0~~	~~145.0~~	~~145.0~~	–	–	–	–	–	–

== Sources ==
- "Official Olympic Report". International Olympic Committee. Archived from the original on 12 June 2007.
