= Samsudeen (name) =

Samsudeen is both a given name and a surname. Notable people with the name include:

- Samsudeen (fl. 1971–1989), Indian politician
- Samsudeen Kabeer (born 1970), Indian weightlifter
- Azlan Samsudeen (born 1997), Sri Lankan cricketer
