= Weightlifting at the 2002 Asian Games – Men's 77 kg =

Men's 77 kg at the 2002 Asian Games
- Venue: Pukyong National University Gymnasium
- Date: 4 October 2002
- Competitors: 13 from 12 nations

Medalists
gold medal	Sergey Filimonov	Kazakhstan
silver medal	Mohammad Hossein Barkhah	Iran
bronze medal	Mohammad Ali Falahatinejad	Iran

The men's 77 kilograms event at the 2002 Asian Games took place on October 4, 2002 at Pukyong National University Gymnasium.

== Schedule ==
All times are Korea Standard Time (UTC+09:00)

Date	Time	Event
Friday, 4 October 2002	15:00	Group A

== Records ==
Prior to this competition, the existing world, Asian and Games records were as follows.

World Record	Snatch	Plamen Zhelyazkov (BUL)	172.5 kg	Doha, Qatar	27 March 2002
World Record	Clean & Jerk	Oleg Perepetchenov (RUS)	210.0 kg	Trenčín, Slovakia	27 April 2001
World Record	Total	Plamen Zhelyazkov (BUL)	377.5 kg	Doha, Qatar	27 March 2002
Asian Record	Snatch	Li Hongli (CHN)	168.0 kg	Osaka, Japan	22 May 2001
Asian Record	Clean & Jerk	Zhan Xugang (CHN)	207.5 kg	Sydney, Australia	22 September 2000
Asian Record	Total	Zhan Xugang (CHN)	367.5 kg	Sydney, Australia	22 September 2000
Games Record	Snatch	Zhan Xugang (CHN)	160.0 kg	Bangkok, Thailand	11 December 1998
Games Record	Clean & Jerk	Mohammad Hossein Barkhah (IRI)	197.5 kg	Bangkok, Thailand	11 December 1998
Games Record	Total	Zhan Xugang (CHN)	355.0 kg	Bangkok, Thailand	11 December 1998

== Results ==
Legend

- NM — No mark

Rank	Athlete	Body weight	Snatch (kg)				Clean & Jerk (kg)				Total
Rank	Athlete	Body weight	1	2	3	Result	1	2	3	Result	Total
1st place, gold medalist(s)	Sergey Filimonov (KAZ)	76.50	165.0	170.0	173.0	172.5	195.0	200.0	202.5	202.5	375.0
2nd place, silver medalist(s)	Mohammad Hossein Barkhah (IRI)	76.85	160.0	~~165.0~~	~~165.0~~	160.0	197.5	202.5	~~205.0~~	202.5	362.5
3rd place, bronze medalist(s)	Mohammad Ali Falahatinejad (IRI)	76.25	~~150.0~~	150.0	~~152.5~~	150.0	195.0	200.0	~~205.0~~	200.0	350.0
4	Ulanbek Moldodosov (KGZ)	76.20	~~152.5~~	152.5	~~160.0~~	152.5	182.5	190.0	~~192.5~~	190.0	342.5
5	Lee Kang-suk (KOR)	76.95	~~152.5~~	~~152.5~~	152.5	152.5	185.0	~~190.0~~	—	185.0	337.5
6	Annaberdi Babaýew (TKM)	76.45	145.0	150.0	~~155.0~~	150.0	170.0	180.0	~~182.5~~	180.0	330.0
7	Abdullah Iskandarani (SYR)	76.80	140.0	145.0	~~150.0~~	145.0	172.5	~~177.5~~	~~177.5~~	172.5	317.5
8	Suhrob Djuraev (TJK)	76.55	130.0	140.0	~~145.0~~	140.0	160.0	~~170.0~~	~~170.0~~	160.0	300.0
9	Maarouf Tarha (LIB)	76.70	120.0	~~125.0~~	125.0	125.0	~~155.0~~	155.0	~~162.5~~	155.0	280.0
10	Abdulredha Yahya (BRN)	75.35	110.0	~~115.0~~	~~115.0~~	110.0	130.0	~~135.0~~	~~135.0~~	130.0	240.0
—	Li Hongli (CHN)	76.65	165.0	170.0	173.0	172.5	~~197.5~~	~~197.5~~	~~197.5~~	—	NM
—	Awais Akbar (PAK)	71.60	~~135.0~~	~~140.0~~	~~140.0~~	—	—	—	—	—	NM
—	Nader Sufyan Abbas (QAT)	76.75	—	—	—	—	—	—	—	—	NM

== New records ==
The following records were established during the competition.

Snatch	165.0	Sergey Filimonov (KAZ)	GR
Snatch	170.0	Sergey Filimonov (KAZ)	AR
Snatch	173.0	Sergey Filimonov (KAZ)	WR
Clean & Jerk	200.0	Mohammad Ali Falahatinejad (IRI)	GR
Clean & Jerk	202.5	Mohammad Hossein Barkhah (IRI)	GR
Total	367.5	Sergey Filimonov (KAZ)	GR
Total	372.5	Sergey Filimonov (KAZ)	AR
Total	375.0	Sergey Filimonov (KAZ)	AR
