= Oleksiy Khizhniak =

Ukrainian weightlifter

Personal information
- Nationality: Ukrainian
- Born: 9 June 1975 (age 49)

Sport
- Sport: Weightlifting

Oleksiy Khizhniak (Ukrainian: Олексій Хижняк; born 9 June 1975) is a Ukrainian weightlifter. He competed in the men's lightweight event at the 1996 Summer Olympics.
