= Stănel Stoica =

Romanian weightlifter

Personal information
- Nationality: Romanian
- Born: 24 January 1980 (age 45); Constanța, Romania

Sport
- Sport: Weightlifting

Stănel Stoica (born 24 January 1980) is a Romanian weightlifter. He competed in the men's lightweight event at the 2004 Summer Olympics.
