= Oleg Yem =

Kazakhstani weightlifter

Personal information
- Nationality: Kazakhstani
- Born: 26 January 1974 (age 51)

Sport
- Sport: Weightlifting

Oleg Yem (born 26 January 1974) is a Kazakhstani weightlifter. He competed in the men's featherweight event at the 1996 Summer Olympics.
