= Adrián Popa =

Hungarian weightlifter (born 1971)

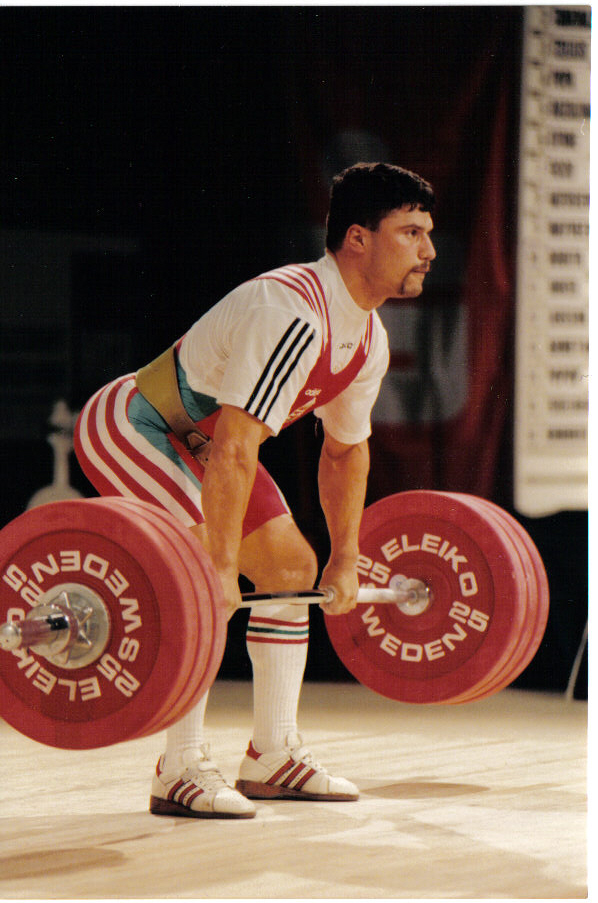
- Popa Adrian at the Summer Olympic Games Atlanta 1996

Personal information
- Nationality: Hungarian
- Born: Adrián Popa; 8 December 1971 (age 54) Sibiu, Romania
- Height: 160 cm (5 ft 3 in)
- Weight: 68 kg (150 lb)

Sport
- Country: Hungary
- Sport: Weightlifting
- Event(s): –64kg, –69kg, –77kg
- Club: Nyíregyházi Vasutas Sport Club

Adrián Popa (born 8 December 1971, in Sibiu) is a Hungarian weightlifter of Romanian descent.

He has represented his country in the Men's 64 kg event of the 1996 Summer Olympics, ranking 5th, the Men's 69 kg event of the 1998 World Weightlifting Championships, the Men's 77 kg event of the 1999 World Weightlifting Championships and the Men's 77 kg event of the 2000 Summer Olympics.

== Major results ==
Year	Venue	Weight	Snatch (kg)					Clean & Jerk (kg)					Total	Rank
Year	Venue	Weight	1	2	3	Results	Rank	1	2	3	Results	Rank	Total	Rank
Representing Hungary
Olympic Games
2000	Sydney, Australia	77 kg	—	—	—	—	—	—	—	—	—	—	—	DNS
1996	Atlanta, United States	64 kg	130.0	135.0	~~137.5~~	135.0	10	167.5	~~172.5~~	172.5	172.5	5	307.5	5
World Championships
2001	Antalya, Turkey	77 kg	147.5	152.5	155.0	155.0	7	192.5	~~197.5~~	~~197.5~~	192.5	7	347.5	7
1999	Athens, Greece	77 kg	140.0	145.0	150.0	150.0	22	187.5	195.0	200.0	200.0	5	350.0	12
1998	Lahti, Finland	69 kg	~~135.0~~	135.0	~~140.0~~	135.0	18	180.0	~~185.0~~	~~187.5~~	180.0	8	315.0	12
1997	Chiang Mai, Thailand	70 kg	135.0	~~140.0~~	~~140.0~~	135.0	12	177.5	~~182.5~~	~~182.5~~	177.5	7	312.5	9
1995	Guangzhou, China	64 kg	—N/a	—N/a	—N/a	130.0	14	—N/a	—N/a	—N/a	170.0	5	300.0	8
European Championships
2001	Trenčín, Slovakia	77 kg	140.0	145.0	150.0	150.0	6	185.0	190.0	~~192.5~~	190.0	4	340.0	4
1998	Riesa, Germany	69 kg	~~135.0~~	~~135.0~~	135.0	135.0	16	172.5	177.5	~~182.5~~	177.5	4	312.5	6
1997	Rijeka, Croatia	70 kg	137.5	~~140.0~~	~~140.0~~	137.5	9	~~177.5~~	177.5	180.0	180.0	3rd place, bronze medalist(s)	317.5	5
Representing Romania
European Championships
1993	Sofia, Bulgaria	64 kg	—N/a	—N/a	—N/a	125.0	8	—N/a	—N/a	—N/a	162.5	7	287.5	8
1992	Szekszárd, Hungary	67.5 kg	—N/a	—N/a	—N/a	120.0	11	—N/a	—N/a	—N/a	165.0	8	285.0	8
