= 2000 European Weightlifting Championships =

International weightlifting competition

2000 European Championships

The 2000 European Weightlifting Championships were held in Sofia, Bulgaria. It was the 79th edition of the event.

== Medal overview ==
=== Men ===
Event	Gold	Silver	Bronze
– 56 kg	(Turkey) Halil Mutlu	(Bulgaria) Ivan Ivanov	(Romania) Adrian Jigau
– 62 kg	(Croatia) Nikolaj Pešalov	(Bulgaria) Sevdalin Angelov	(Turkey) Naim Suleymanoglu
– 69 kg	(Belarus) Sergei Lavrenov	(Bulgaria) Georgi Markov	(Turkey) Yasin Arslan
– 77 kg	(Bulgaria) Zlatan Vanev	(Bulgaria) Plamen Zhelyazkov	(Albania) Ilirian Suli
– 85 kg	(Georgia (country)) Giorgi Asanidze	(Bulgaria) Georgi Gardev	(Russia) Yury Myshkovets
– 94 kg	(Poland) Szymon Kolecki	(Moldova) Vadim Vacarciuc	(Turkey) Bünyami Sudaş
– 105 kg	(Bulgaria) Metin Kadir	(Poland) Robert Dolega	(Russia) Evgeny Chichliannikov
+ 105 kg	(Armenia) Ashot Danielyan	(Germany) Ronny Weller	(Latvia) Viktors Ščerbatihs

=== Women ===
Event	Gold	Silver	Bronze
– 48 kg	(Bulgaria) Donka Mincheva	(Italy) Eva Giganti	(Ukraine) Olena Zinovyeva
– 53 kg	(Bulgaria) Izabela Dragneva	(Spain) Estefania Juan	(Bulgaria) Siyka Stoyeva
– 58 kg	(Bulgaria) Neli Yankova	(Poland) Aleksandra Klejnowska	(Ukraine) Nataliya Skakun
– 63 kg	(Russia) Valentina Popova	(Spain) Josefa Perez	(Czech Republic) Veronika Buronova
– 69 kg	(Bulgaria) Milena Trendafilova	(Bulgaria) Daniela Kerkelova	(Russia) Irina Kasimova
– 75 kg	(Russia) Svetlana Khabirova	(Russia) Venera Mannanova	(Poland) Beata Prei
+ 75 kg	(Ukraine) Vita Rudenok	(Germany) Monique Riesterer	(Russia) Albina Khomich
