= Hwang Hui-yeol =

South Korean weightlifter

Personal information
- Nationality: South Korean
- Born: 27 July 1969 (age 55)

Sport
- Sport: Weightlifting

Hwang Hui-yeol (born 27 July 1969) is a South Korean weightlifter. He competed in the men's featherweight event at the 1996 Summer Olympics.
