= Ilian Iliev (weightlifter) =

Bulgarian weightlifter

Personal information
- Nationality: Bulgarian
- Born: 9 May 1973 (age 52); Yambol, Bulgaria

Sport
- Sport: Weightlifting

Ilian Iliev (Bulgarian: Илиан Илиев; born 9 May 1973) is a Bulgarian former weightlifter. He competed in the men's featherweight event at the 1996 Summer Olympics.
