= Vladimir Bîrsa =

Moldovan weightlifter (born 1972)

Personal information
- Born: 22 April 1972 (age 53)
- Weight: 76.46 kg (168.6 lb)

Sport
- Country: Moldova
- Sport: Weightlifting
- Weight class: 77 kg
- Team: National team
- Updated on 17 September 2016

Vladimir Bîrsa (born 22 April 1972) is a Moldovan male weightlifter, competing in the 77 kg category and representing Moldova at international competitions. He participated at the 1996 Summer Olympics in the 76 kg event. He competed at world championships, most recently at the 2003 World Weightlifting Championships. Until February 2010, he held the national Snatch record in Moldova, when Alexandru Dudoglo beat his record.

== Major results ==
Year	Venue	Weight	Snatch (kg)				Clean & Jerk (kg)				Total	Rank
Year	Venue	Weight	1	2	3	Rank	1	2	3	Rank	Total	Rank
Summer Olympics
1996	Atlanta, United States	76 kg				—N/a				—N/a		13
World Championships
2003	Vancouver, Canada	77 kg	150	~~152.5~~	152.5	10	180	185	~~187.5~~	12	337.5	9
1999	Piraeus, Greece	77 kg	145	~~150~~	~~150~~	28	175	177.5	~~180~~	26	322.5	28
