= Mohammad Ali Falahatinejad =

Iranian weightlifter (1976–2017)

Personal information
- Nationality: Iran
- Born: 15 July 1976
- Died: 14 August 2017 (aged 41)
- Weight: 76.69 kg (169.1 lb)

Sport
- Country: Iran
- Sport: Weightlifting
- Event: 77 kg

Achievements and titles
- Personal bests: Snatch: 155 kg (2003); Clean and jerk: 208 kg (2003); Total: 363 kg (2003)
Medal record
Men's weightlifting
Representing Iran
World Championships
Gold medal – first place	2003 Vancouver	77 kg
Asian Games
Bronze medal – third place	2002 Busan	77 kg
Asian Championships
Silver medal – second place	2003 Qinhuangdao	77 kg

Mohammad Ali Falahatinejad (Persian: محمد‌علی فلاحتی‌نژاد, 15 July 1976, Tehran – 14 August 2017, Tehran) was an Iranian weightlifter who won the gold medal in the Men's 77 kg weight class at the 2003 World Weightlifting Championships.

He also won the silver medal at the 2003 Asian Weightlifting Championships and a bronze at the 2002 Asian Games.

== Major results ==
Year	Venue	Weight	Snatch (kg)				Clean & Jerk (kg)				Total	Rank
Year	Venue	Weight	1	2	3	Rank	1	2	3	Rank	Total	Rank
World Championships
1999	Athens, Greece	69 kg	130	135	~~137.5~~	26	170	~~177.5~~	~~177.5~~	28	305	25
2002	Warsaw, Poland	77 kg	~~145~~	~~145~~	~~145~~	--	~~195~~	~~195~~	~~200~~	--	--	--
2003	Vancouver, Canada	77 kg	150	155	~~157.5~~	7	197.5	202.5	~~210.5~~	1st place, gold medalist(s)	357.5	1st place, gold medalist(s)
2007	Chiang Mai, Thailand	77 kg	140	~~145~~	~~145~~	35	181	~~188~~	188	13	328	21
Asian Games
2002	Busan, South Korea	77 kg	~~150~~	150	~~152.5~~	6	195	200	~~205~~	3	350	3rd place, bronze medalist(s)
Asian Championships
2003	Qinhuangdao, China	77 kg	155			3rd place, bronze medalist(s)	208			1st place, gold medalist(s)	363	2nd place, silver medalist(s)
