= Aleksandr Okhramenko =

Kazakhstani weightlifter

Personal information
- Nationality: Kazakhstani
- Born: 16 June 1971 (age 53)

Sport
- Sport: Weightlifting

Aleksandr Okhramenko (born 16 June 1971) is a Kazakhstani weightlifter. He competed in the men's featherweight event at the 1996 Summer Olympics.
