= Wojciech Natusiewicz =

Polish weightlifter

Personal information
- Nationality: Polish
- Born: 7 July 1975 (age 49); Koszalin, Poland

Sport
- Sport: Weightlifting

Wojciech Natusiewicz (born 7 July 1975) is a Polish weightlifter. He competed in the men's featherweight event at the 1996 Summer Olympics.
