= Francisco Cáceres =

Salvadoran weightlifter

Personal information
- Nationality: Salvadoran
- Born: 8 October 1974 (age 50)

Sport
- Sport: Weightlifting

Francisco Cáceres (born 8 October 1974) is a Salvadoran weightlifter. He competed in the men's featherweight event at the 1996 Summer Olympics.
