= Rudolf Lukáč =

Slovak weightlifter

Personal information
- Full name: Rudolf Lukac
- Born: 29 December 1969 (age 56) Považská Bystrica, Slovakia
- Height: 165 cm (5 ft 5 in)
- Weight: 76.95 kg (169.6 lb)

Sport
- Country: Slovakia
- Sport: Weightlifting
- Weight class: 77 kg
- Club: TJ Diana Orol Ružomberok
- Team: National team
- Updated on 9 September 2016

Rudolf Lukac (born 29 December 1969 in Považská Bystrica) is a Slovak male weightlifter, competing in the 77 kg category and representing Slovakia at international competitions. He participated at the 1996 Summer Olympics in the 70 kg event and at the 2004 Summer Olympics in the 77 kg event. He competed at world championships, most recently at the 2007 World Weightlifting Championships.

== Major results ==
Year	Venue	Weight	Snatch (kg)				Clean & Jerk (kg)				Total	Rank
Year	Venue	Weight	1	2	3	Rank	1	2	3	Rank	Total	Rank
Summer Olympics
2004	Athens, Greece	77 kg										14
1996	Atlanta, United States	70 kg										20
World Championships
2007	Chiang Mai, Thailand	77 kg	~~135~~	~~137~~	~~137~~	---	---	---	---	---	0	---
2003	Vancouver, Canada	77 kg	142.5	~~147.5~~	147.5	19	185	190	~~195~~	5	337.5	8
2001	Antalya, Turkey	69 kg	~~132.5~~	132.5	137.5	13	~~167.5~~	~~167.5~~	172.5	12	310	13
1999	Piraeus, Greece	69 kg	135	~~140~~	~~140~~	24	170	175	~~177.5~~	19	310	21
1999		70 kg										
