= Abdallah Al-Sebaei =

Syrian weightlifter (born 1976)

Abdallah Alsebaai
Personal information
- Full name: Abdallah Alsebaai
- Nationality: Syrian
- Born: 24 February 1976 (age 49)

Sport
- Sport: Weightlifting

Abdallah Alsebaai (born 24 February 1976) is a Syrian weightlifter. He competed in the men's lightweight event at the 1996 Summer Olympics.
