= Peter Kilapa =

Papua New Guinean weightlifter

Personal information
- Nationality: Papua New Guinean
- Born: 26 May 1970 (age 54)

Sport
- Sport: Weightlifting

Peter Kilapa (born 26 May 1970) is a Papua New Guinean weightlifter. He competed in the men's lightweight event at the 1996 Summer Olympics. Kilapa was also placed 12th in the Lightweight (70 kg) Snatch, 11th in the Clean and Jerk and 11th Overall at the 1994 Commonwealth Games.
