= Alfonso Grullart =

Dominican Republic weightlifter

Personal information
- Nationality: Dominican
- Born: 13 July 1967 (age 57)

Sport
- Sport: Weightlifting

Alfonso Grullart (born 13 July 1967) is a Dominican Republic weightlifter. He competed in the men's featherweight event at the 1996 Summer Olympics.
