= Samsudeen Kabeer =

Indian weightlifter (born 1970)

Personal information
- Nationality: Indian
- Born: 3 August 1970 (age 55)

Sport
- Sport: Weightlifting

Samsudeen Kabeer (born 3 August 1970) is an Indian weightlifter. He competed in the men's lightweight event at the 1996 Summer Olympics.
