= Thanh Nguyen (weightlifter) =

American weightlifter

Personal information
- Nationality: American
- Born: June 18, 1964 (age 62) Saigon, Vietnam

Sport
- Sport: Weightlifting

Thanh Nguyen (born June 18, 1964) is an American weightlifter. He competed in the men's featherweight event at the 1996 Summer Olympics.
