= Kuo Cheng-wei (weightlifter) =

Taiwanese weightlifter

Personal information
- Nationality: Taiwanese
- Born: 12 June 1982 (age 43)
- Height: 170 cm (5 ft 7 in)
- Weight: 69 kg (152 lb)

Sport
- Sport: Weightlifting

Kuo Cheng-wei (Chinese: 郭承偉, born 12 June 1982) is a Taiwanese weightlifter. He competed in the men's lightweight event at the 2004 Summer Olympics.
