= Yasin Arslan =

Turkish weightlifter (born 1978)

Personal information
- Born: 23 July 1978 (age 46)
- Height: 165 cm (5 ft 5 in)
- Weight: 68.63 kg (151.3 lb)

Sport
- Country: Turkey
- Sport: Weightlifting
- Weight class: 69 kg
- Team: National team
- Updated on 8 September 2016

Yasin Arslan (born 23 July 1978) is a Turkish male weightlifter, competing in the 69 kg category and representing Turkey at international competitions. He participated at the 2000 Summer Olympics in the 69 kg event. He competed at world championships, most recently at the 2007 World Weightlifting Championships.

== Major results ==
Year	Venue	Weight	Snatch (kg)				Clean & Jerk (kg)				Total	Rank
Year	Venue	Weight	1	2	3	Rank	1	2	3	Rank	Total	Rank
Summer Olympics
2000	Sydney, Australia	69 kg	130.0	135.0	~~137.5~~		160.0	165.0	~~170.0~~		300.0	14
World Championships
2007	Chiang Mai, Thailand	69 kg	135	140	142	10	160	165	~~168~~	19	307	14
2001	Antalya, Turkey	69 kg	145	150	~~152.5~~	2nd place, silver medalist(s)	~~175~~	175	~~180~~	8	325	5
1999	Piraeus, Greece	69 kg	145	~~150~~	150	5	177.5	180	~~182.5~~	8	330	7
1997	Chiang Mai, Thailand	70 kg	135.0	140.0	142.5	6	165.0	170.0	~~172.5~~	12	312.5	7
