= Zhan Xugang =

Chinese weightlifter (born 1974)

Personal information
- Born: May 15, 1974 (age 52) Kaihua County, Zhejiang, China
Medal record
Men's weightlifting
Representing China
Olympic Games
Gold medal – first place	1996 Atlanta	–70 kg
Gold medal – first place	2000 Sydney	–77 kg
World Championships
Gold medal – first place	1995 Guangzhou	–70 kg
Silver medal – second place	1997 Chiang Mai	–70 kg
Asian Games
Gold medal – first place	1994 Hiroshima	–70 kg
Gold medal – first place	1998 Bangkok	–77 kg
Asian Championships
Gold medal – first place	1995 Busan	–70 kg
Silver medal – second place	1996 Yachiyo	–70 kg
Gold medal – first place	1999 Wuhan	–77 kg
Gold medal – first place	2000 Osaka	–77 kg
Bronze medal – third place	2004 Almaty	–77 kg
East Asian Games
Gold medal – first place	1997 Busan	–70 kg
Junior World Championships
Gold medal – first place	1993 Cheb	–70 kg
Gold medal – first place	1994 Jakarta	–70 kg
Junior Asian Championships
Gold medal – first place	1993	–70 kg
National Games of China
Gold medal – first place	1997 Shanghai	–70 kg
Silver medal – second place	2001 Guangdong	–77 kg

Zhan Xugang (Chinese: 占旭刚; born May 15, 1974, in Kaihua County, Zhejiang) is a former male Chinese weightlifter and later politician. He is the first Chinese weightlifter to win gold at two consecutive Olympic, at the 1996 and 2000 Olympic Games.

== Biography ==
=== Weightlifting career ===
Zhan Xugang was recruited for the Kaihua County Sports School weightlifting program at ten years of age. Due to his progress Zhan was selected for the Zhejiang provincial team in 1987, and broke a national junior record the same year. In 1993 while on the national junior team he was named "an outstanding Asian Junior weightlifter" and selected to the senior team in January 1994. In 1996, at the Atlanta Olympic Games, Zhan Xugang won the gold medal and broke 3 World Records. In 1998, the International Weightlifting Federation implemented new weightlifting levels. Zhan Xugang entered the 77 kg class. Zhan was challenged as the levels of his competitors rose. At the Sydney Olympic Games in 2000, Zhan snatched 160 kg and ranked fourth in the competition. Despite the adverse circumstance, he was able to clean and jerk 207.5 kg, a personal record. This allowed him to total 367.5 kg and win gold. At the 2004 Games he missed all three snatch attempts in the men's 77 kg division and did not finish the competition. Afterwards he announced his retirement.

=== Political career ===
Going forward Zhan Xugang mainly engaged in sports management in Zhejiang Province as the deputy commander in charge of weightlifting, judo and taekwondo. In 2005 he became director of the sports department of the Career Technical College.

In 2008, Zhan was one of the torch bearers for the opening ceremony of the Beijing Olympics.

In the beginning of 2012, Zhan was promoted to vice president of Zhejiang sports of the Career Technical College and became the director of seven departments. In July 2015, he served as committee member for his home and was proposed to be the deputy governor of three counties.

== Major results ==
Year	Venue	Weight	Snatch (kg)				Clean & Jerk (kg)				Total	Rank
Year	Venue	Weight	1	2	3	Rank	1	2	3	Rank	Total	Rank
Olympic Games
1996	Atlanta, United States	70 kg	155	160	162.5	1	190	~~192.5~~	195	1	357.7	1st place, gold medalist(s)
2000	Sydney, Australia	77 kg	160.0	~~165.0~~	~~165.0~~	6	202.5	207.5	-	1	367.5	1st place, gold medalist(s)
2004	Athens, Greece	77 kg	~~157.5~~	~~157.5~~	~~157.5~~	-	-	-	-	-	-	DNF
World Championships
1997	Chiang Mai, Thailand	70 kg	~~155.0~~	~~155.0~~	157.5	2nd place, silver medalist(s)	190.0	195.5	~~197.5~~	2nd place, silver medalist(s)	352.5	2nd place, silver medalist(s)
1998	Lahti, Finland	77 kg	~~155.0~~	~~155.0~~	~~160.0~~	—	~~200.0~~	200.0	~~202.5~~	4	—	

Records
Preceded by (Cuba) Idalberto Aranda	Men's 77 kg World Record Holder (C&J); 2 September 1999 – 28 April 2000	Succeeded by (Bulgaria) Zlatan Vanev
