= Serghei Cretu =

Moldovan weightlifter

Personal information
- Nationality: Moldovan
- Born: 4 December 1971 (age 54)

Sport
- Sport: Weightlifting

Serghei Cretu (born 4 December 1971) is a Moldovan weightlifter. He competed in the men's lightweight event at the 1996 Summer Olympics.
