= Galabin Boevski =

Bulgarian weightlifter (born 1974)

Personal information
- Full name: Galabin Pepov Boevski
- Nationality: Bulgarian
- Born: 19 December 1974 (age 51) Knezha, Bulgaria
- Height: 1.75 m (5 ft 9 in)
- Weight: 69 kg (152 lb)

Sport
- Country: Bulgaria
- Sport: Weightlifting
- Coached by: Ivan Abadjiev Plamen Asparukhov
- Retired: 2004
Medal record
Men's weightlifting
Representing Bulgaria
Olympic Games
Gold medal – first place	2000 Sydney	69 kg
World Championships
Gold medal – first place	1999 Athens	69 kg
Gold medal – first place	2001 Antalya	69 kg
European Championships
Gold medal – first place	1999 La Coruña	69 kg
Gold medal – first place	2002 Antalya	69 kg
Gold medal – first place	2003 Loutraki	69 kg
European Junior Championships
Silver medal – second place	1994 Rome	64 kg

Galabin Pepov Boevski (Bulgarian: Гълъбин Пепов Боевски, born 19 December 1974) is a Bulgarian weightlifter. He was born in Knezha, and was both world and Olympic champion. He was later suspended for eight years after failing drug tests.

Boevski was sentenced to nine years and four months in prison in Brazil for cocaine trafficking. He was arrested in October 2011 while trying to board a plane in São Paulo, Brazil, to Europe with 9 kilos of cocaine. In October 2012, the appellate court of Brazil decided against reducing his sentence. On 23 October 2013, he returned to Bulgaria. Asked how, he did not comment. The Bulgarian government stated that the release was a unilateral act by Brazil and they do not know of any details.

In October 2021 he was once again arrested for trafficking cocaine, this time in Portugal, where he lives with his family. After being sentenced to six and a half years, he was released early, on 2 July 2024.

== Weightlifting career ==
=== Senior trophies ===
Galabin Boevski made his senior international weightlifting debut at World Championship in Lahti, Finland in 1998. He finished fourth in the total narrowly missing on a medal, but winning silver in the clean and jerk.

The following year he became both European and World champion in the lightweight class up to 69 kg in La Coruna Spain and Athens, Greece.

At the 2000 Summer Olympics he won the gold medal in the lightweight class beating by 5 kg his teammate Georgi Markov.

He became World champion for the second time in 2001, and European champion in 2002 and in 2003.

Galabin Boevski won 6 out of 8 major senior weightlifting competitions in which he took part, failing to win just twice - the World Championship in Lahti, 1999, when he finished fourth and the World Championship in Warsaw, 2002 when he bombed out in the clean and jerk.

=== World Records ===
Boevski set six senior world records in the 69 kg class during his career.

His first world record was set on 16th of April 1999, at the European Championship in La Coruna, Spain - a total WR of 352.5 kg.

His second and third WR were posted in the snatch on 24th of November, 1999 - 160.5 kg and 162.5 kg, consecutive successful attempts at the 1999 World Championship in Athens, Greece. In the second part of the same competition Boevski set a fourth WR - 196 kg in the clean & jerk, thus achieving also his fifth total WR of 357.5 kg which bettered the previous one from La Coruna.

In 2000 at the Summer Olympics in Sydney Boevski set his sixth and last world record of 196.5 kg in the process of winning the Olympic gold medal in the 69 kg category.

His clean & jerk record of 196.5 kg from the 2000 Summer Olympics and his total world record of 357.5 kg (set at the 1999 World Championships) were not broken until 2013 by Liao Hui who managed 198 kg and 358 kg respectively.

=== #19 amongst the greatest lifters of all time ===
Boevski's olympic total of 359 kg in Sydney, 2000, (162.5 kg + 196.5 kg) at a personal bodyweight of 68.65 kg. accounts for 19th place in the all-time greats weightlifter list. His Sinclair score achieved was 478.69 pts.

Ostrowitz, Seb (2018). The Greatest Weightlifters of All Time, vol. 1 - men. Powerful Ideas Press. p. 145.

=== IWF suspensions ===
Boevski served a two-year suspension between 1996 and 1998 after being caught and confessing to the use of anabolic steroids.

However, he was one of the few Bulgarian weightlifters that were clean in the doping row that resulted in the ejection of the Bulgarian weightlifting team from Sydney's Olympic Village following three positive doping results. In 2004 Boevski was banned for eight years for allegedly tampering with his urine samples in 2003.

=== Major results ===
Year	Venue	Weight	Snatch (kg)				Clean and jerk (kg)				Total	Rank
Year	Venue	Weight	1	2	3	Rank	1	2	3	Rank	Total	Rank
Represented Bulgaria
Olympic Games
2000	Sydney, Australia	69 kg	155.0	160.0	162.5	-	185.0	190.0	196.5 WR	-	357.5	1st place, gold medalist(s)
World Championships
1998	Lahti, Finland	69 kg	152.5	~~157.5~~	~~157.5~~	5	185.0	~~190.0~~	~~190.0~~	2nd place, silver medalist(s)	337.5	4
1999	Athens, Greece	69 kg	155.0	160.5 WR	162.5 WR	1st place, gold medalist(s)	185.0	190.0	196.0 WR	1st place, gold medalist(s)	357.5 WR	1st place, gold medalist(s)
2001	Antalya, Turkey	69 kg	150.0	~~155.0~~	~~157.5~~	6	180.0	187.5	190.0	1st place, gold medalist(s)	340.0	1st place, gold medalist(s)
2002	Warsaw, Poland	69 kg	~~150.0~~	150.0	~~155.0~~	5	~~187.5~~	~~187.5~~	~~187.5~~	-	-	-
European Championships
1999	La Coruña, Spain	69 kg	150	155	160	1st place, gold medalist(s)	182.5	187.5	192.5	1st place, gold medalist(s)	352.5 WR	1st place, gold medalist(s)
2002	Antalya, Turkey	69 kg	150	155	160	1st place, gold medalist(s)	185	190	~~197~~	1st place, gold medalist(s)	350	1st place, gold medalist(s)
2003	Loutraki, Greece	69 kg	150	155	157.5	1st place, gold medalist(s)	185	190	~~197.5~~	1st place, gold medalist(s)	347.5	1st place, gold medalist(s)
World Junior Championships U20
1994	Jakarta, Indonesia	64 kg	137.5	0	0	2nd place, silver medalist(s)	162.5	0	0	4	300	4
European Junior Championships U20
1993	Valencia, Spain	64 kg	127.5	0	0	5	150	0	0	7	277.5	6
1994	Rome, Italy	64 kg	135	0	0	2nd place, silver medalist(s)	162.5	0	0	2nd place, silver medalist(s)	297.5	2nd place, silver medalist(s)

== Honours ==
In 1999 Galabin Boevski was awarded 1st place in the annual survey Bulgarian Sportsperson of the Year. He was also third in the year 2000, and second in 2001.

== Drug trafficking ==
Boevski was arrested in October 2011, for possession of 9 kg of cocaine at the Guarulhos Airport in São Paulo, Brazil, on his way back from a tennis tournament for his daughter, Sara. He was allegedly recruited as a mule to smuggle illegal drugs from Brazil to Western Europe. The drug was found hidden in special secret compartments inside his suitcase.

In May 2012, Boevski was sentenced to 9 years and 4 months in prison by the Federal Court in Brazil. Until the end of his trial, Boevski maintained his position that he is absolutely innocent and is not a mule or a drug trafficker. He supposed that he might have picked up the wrong suitcases intended for someone else. A little over a year later, in October 2013, Boevski surprisingly landed at Sofia's airport as a free man. The Bulgarian authorities had not been informed of his release and had no comment. Subsequently, it was made clear that Boevski was expulsed from prison following a usual Brazilian procedure for expulsion of foreign prisoners.

The Bulgarian authorities were criticized for the lack of coordination and communication with their Brazilian counterparts - mainly for not indicting Boevski in Bulgaria and for not knowing of his Brazilian expulsion.

== The White Prisoner ==
On December 21, 2013, Trud published a biography on Boevski's life entitled The White Prisoner: Galabin Boevski's Secret Story (Bulgarian: Белият затворник. Тайната история на Гълъбин Боевски). The book was written by Ognian Georgiev, a sports editor for the daily newspaper Bulgaria Today. The book spans Boevski's entire career as well as his cocaine conviction and release. The English version was published on 30 May 2014 as print and e-book.
