= 1998 World Weightlifting Championships =

International weightlifting competition

1998 World Championships
- Host city: Lahti, Finland
- Dates: 10–15 November

The 1998 World Weightlifting Championships were held in Lahti, Finland from November 10 to November 15, 1998.

== Medal summary ==
=== Men ===
Event	Gold		Silver		Bronze	
56 kg
Snatch	Halil Mutlu; Turkey	135.0 kg	Lan Shizhang; China	127.5 kg	William Vargas; Cuba	127.5 kg
Clean & Jerk	Halil Mutlu; Turkey	160.0 kg	Ivan Ivanov; Bulgaria	160.0 kg	Lan Shizhang; China	157.5 kg
Total	Halil Mutlu; Turkey	295.0 kg	Lan Shizhang; China	285.0 kg	Ivan Ivanov; Bulgaria	282.5 kg
62 kg
Snatch	Leonidas Sabanis; Greece	147.5 kg WR	Nikolaj Pešalov; Croatia	145.0 kg	Sevdalin Minchev; Bulgaria	140.0 kg
Clean & Jerk	Leonidas Sabanis; Greece	172.5 kg	Nikolaj Pešalov; Croatia	172.5 kg	Sevdalin Minchev; Bulgaria	170.0 kg
Total	Leonidas Sabanis; Greece	320.0 kg	Nikolaj Pešalov; Croatia	317.5 kg	Sevdalin Minchev; Bulgaria	310.0 kg
69 kg
Snatch	Plamen Zhelyazkov; Bulgaria	160.0 kg WR	Wan Jianhui; China	158.0 kg	Georgios Tzelilis; Greece	155.0 kg
Clean & Jerk	Plamen Zhelyazkov; Bulgaria	190.0 kg	Galabin Boevski; Bulgaria	185.0 kg	Valerios Leonidis; Greece	185.0 kg
Total	Plamen Zhelyazkov; Bulgaria	350.0 kg WR	Georgios Tzelilis; Greece	340.0 kg	Wan Jianhui; China	340.0 kg
77 kg
Snatch	Giorgi Asanidze; Georgia	168.0 kg WR	Mehmet Yılmaz; Turkey	165.0 kg	Zlatan Vanev; Bulgaria	162.5 kg
Clean & Jerk	Zlatan Vanev; Bulgaria	202.5 kg	Petar Tanev; Bulgaria	202.5 kg	Viktor Mitrou; Greece	202.5 kg
Total	Zlatan Vanev; Bulgaria	365.0 kg	Petar Tanev; Bulgaria	362.5 kg	Mehmet Yılmaz; Turkey	360.0 kg
85 kg
Snatch	Georgi Gardev; Bulgaria	177.5 kg	Pyrros Dimas; Greece	178.0 kg WR	Yury Myshkovets; Russia	175.0 kg
Clean & Jerk	Marc Huster; Germany	210.0 kg	Pyrros Dimas; Greece	210.0 kg	Yury Myshkovets; Russia	207.5 kg
Total	Pyrros Dimas; Greece	387.5 kg	Marc Huster; Germany	385.0 kg	Yury Myshkovets; Russia	382.5 kg
94 kg
Snatch	Oliver Caruso; Germany	182.5 kg	Tadeusz Drzazga; Poland	180.0 kg	Akakios Kakiasvilis; Greece	180.0 kg
Clean & Jerk	Akakios Kakiasvilis; Greece	220.0 kg	Leonidas Kokas; Greece	217.5 kg	Szymon Kołecki; Poland	218.0 kg
Total	Akakios Kakiasvilis; Greece	400.0 kg	Oliver Caruso; Germany	395.0 kg	Leonidas Kokas; Greece	392.5 kg
105 kg
Snatch	Cui Wenhua; China	195.0 kg	Denys Hotfrid; Ukraine	192.5 kg	Ihor Razoronov; Ukraine	190.0 kg
Clean & Jerk	Ihor Razoronov; Ukraine	232.5 kg	Martin Tešovič; Slovakia	227.5 kg	Cui Wenhua; China	225.0 kg
Total	Ihor Razoronov; Ukraine	422.5 kg	Cui Wenhua; China	420.0 kg	Denys Hotfrid; Ukraine	415.0 kg
+105 kg
Snatch	Ara Vardanyan; Armenia	197.5 kg	Andrey Chemerkin; Russia	197.5 kg	Viktors Ščerbatihs; Latvia	195.0 kg
Clean & Jerk	Andrey Chemerkin; Russia	240.0 kg	Paweł Najdek; Poland	232.5 kg	Ara Vardanyan; Armenia	230.0 kg
Total	Andrey Chemerkin; Russia	437.5 kg	Ara Vardanyan; Armenia	427.5 kg	Viktors Ščerbatihs; Latvia	422.5 kg

=== Women ===
Event	Gold		Silver		Bronze	
48 kg
Snatch	Li Yunli; China	80.0 kg	Chu Nan-mei; Chinese Taipei	77.5 kg	Tsai Huey-woan; Chinese Taipei	77.5 kg
Clean & Jerk	Li Yunli; China	102.5 kg	Chu Nan-mei; Chinese Taipei	95.0 kg	Kaori Niyanagi; Japan	95.0 kg
Total	Li Yunli; China	182.5 kg	Chu Nan-mei; Chinese Taipei	172.5 kg	Tsai Huey-woan; Chinese Taipei	172.5 kg
53 kg
Snatch	Wang Xiufen; China	92.5 kg	Izabela Dragneva; Bulgaria	87.5 kg	Robin Goad; United States	82.5 kg
Clean & Jerk	Wang Xiufen; China	117.5 kg WR	Izabela Dragneva; Bulgaria	105.0 kg	Robin Goad; United States	100.0 kg
Total	Wang Xiufen; China	210.0 kg WR	Izabela Dragneva; Bulgaria	192.5 kg	Robin Goad; United States	182.5 kg
58 kg
Snatch	Kuo Ping-chun; Chinese Taipei	92.5 kg	Song Zhijuan; China	92.5 kg	Neli Yankova; Bulgaria	87.5 kg
Clean & Jerk	Kuo Ping-chun; Chinese Taipei	115.0 kg	Maryse Turcotte; Canada	115.0 kg	Song Zhijuan; China	115.0 kg
Total	Kuo Ping-chun; Chinese Taipei	207.5 kg	Song Zhijuan; China	207.5 kg	Neli Yankova; Bulgaria	200.0 kg
63 kg
Snatch	Chen Jui-lien; Chinese Taipei	102.5 kg	Valentina Popova; Russia	100.0 kg	Shi Lihua; China	97.5 kg
Clean & Jerk	Shi Lihua; China	127.5 kg	Chen Jui-lien; Chinese Taipei	122.5 kg	Aneta Szczepańska; Poland	115.0 kg
Total	Chen Jui-lien; Chinese Taipei	225.0 kg	Shi Lihua; China	225.0 kg	Valentina Popova; Russia	215.0 kg
69 kg
Snatch	Tang Weifang; China	110.5 kg WR	Erzsébet Márkus; Hungary	102.5 kg	Wu Mei-yi; Chinese Taipei	100.0 kg
Clean & Jerk	Tang Weifang; China	130.0 kg	Wu Mei-yi; Chinese Taipei	127.5 kg	Irina Kasimova; Russia	127.5 kg
Total	Tang Weifang; China	240.0 kg	Wu Mei-yi; Chinese Taipei	227.5 kg	Irina Kasimova; Russia	225.0 kg
75 kg
Snatch	Karoliina Lundahl; Finland	105.0 kg	Mónica Carrió; Spain	100.0 kg	Şule Şahbaz; Turkey	100.0 kg
Clean & Jerk	Gao Xiaoyan; China	130.0 kg	Karoliina Lundahl; Finland	125.0 kg	Mária Takács; Hungary	120.0 kg
Total	Karoliina Lundahl; Finland	230.0 kg	Şule Şahbaz; Turkey	220.0 kg	Mária Takács; Hungary	217.5 kg
+75 kg
Snatch	Agata Wróbel; Poland	115.0 kg	María Isabel Urrutia; Colombia	110.0 kg	Tang Gonghong; China	110.0 kg
Clean & Jerk	Tang Gonghong; China	145.0 kg	Chen Hsiao-lien; Chinese Taipei	140.0 kg	María Isabel Urrutia; Colombia	132.5 kg
Total	Tang Gonghong; China	255.0 kg	Chen Hsiao-lien; Chinese Taipei	245.0 kg	María Isabel Urrutia; Colombia	242.5 kg

== Medal table ==
Ranking by Big (Total result) medals

Rank	Nation	Gold	Silver	Bronze	Total
1	China	4	4	1	9
2	Greece	3	1	1	5
3	Chinese Taipei	2	3	1	6
4	Bulgaria	2	2	3	7
5	Turkey	1	1	1	3
6	Russia	1	0	3	4
7	Ukraine	1	0	1	2
8	Finland	1	0	0	1
9	Germany	0	2	0	2
10	Armenia	0	1	0	1
10	Croatia	0	1	0	1
12	Colombia	0	0	1	1
12	Hungary	0	0	1	1
12	Latvia	0	0	1	1
12	United States	0	0	1	1
Totals (15 entries)		15	15	15	45

Ranking by all medals: Big (Total result) and Small (Snatch and Clean & Jerk)

Rank	Nation	Gold	Silver	Bronze	Total
1	China	14	7	6	27
2	Bulgaria	6	7	7	20
3	Greece	6	4	5	15
4	Chinese Taipei	5	8	3	16
5	Turkey	3	2	2	7
6	Russia	2	2	6	10
7	Germany	2	2	0	4
8	Ukraine	2	1	2	5
9	Finland	2	1	0	3
10	Poland	1	2	2	5
11	Armenia	1	1	1	3
12	Georgia	1	0	0	1
13	Croatia	0	3	0	3
14	Colombia	0	1	2	3
14	Hungary	0	1	2	3
16	Canada	0	1	0	1
16	Slovakia	0	1	0	1
16	Spain	0	1	0	1
19	United States	0	0	3	3
20	Latvia	0	0	2	2
21	Cuba	0	0	1	1
21	Japan	0	0	1	1
Totals (22 entries)		45	45	45	135

== Team ranking ==
=== Men ===
Rank	Team	Points
1	Greece	566
2	Bulgaria	566
3	China	428
4	Turkey	423
5	Germany	419
6	Russia	396

=== Women ===
Rank	Team	Points
1	China	508
2	Chinese Taipei	453
3	Hungary	328
4	Canada	317
5	United States	314
6	Poland	306

== Participating nations ==
332 competitors from 55 nations competed.

- Algeria (3)
- Argentina (2)
- Armenia (5)
- Australia (8)
- Austria (1)
- Azerbaijan (6)
- Belarus (4)
- Belgium (2)
- Bulgaria (12)
- Cameroon (2)
- Canada (15)
- China (15)
- Chinese Taipei (11)
- Colombia (8)
- Croatia (6)
- Cuba (2)
- Czech Republic (4)
- Denmark (4)
- Ecuador (2)
- Egypt (12)
- Finland (15)
- France (12)
- Georgia (2)
- Germany (11)
- Great Britain (7)
- Greece (13)
- Hungary (15)
- Ireland (2)
- Israel (5)
- Italy (10)
- Japan (7)
- Kazakhstan (2)
- Latvia (6)
- Lithuania (1)
- Mexico (1)
- Moldova (2)
- Nauru (10)
- Netherlands (4)
- New Zealand (1)
- Norway (3)
- Panama (1)
- Poland (12)
- Portugal (1)
- Romania (6)
- Russia (10)
- Slovakia (5)
- South Korea (2)
- Spain (9)
- Sweden (2)
- Switzerland (1)
- Turkey (9)
- Uganda (3)
- Ukraine (6)
- United States (7)
- Venezuela (5)
