= Giuseppe Ficco =

Italian weightlifter

Personal information
- Nationality: Italian
- Born: 26 August 1974 (age 50); Bari, Italy

Sport
- Sport: Weightlifting

Giuseppe Ficco (born 26 August 1974) is an Italian weightlifter. He competed in the men's lightweight event at the 2000 Summer Olympics.
