= Romuald Ernault =

French weightlifter

Personal information
- Nationality: French
- Born: 20 April 1977 (age 47); Caen, France

Sport
- Sport: Weightlifting

Romuald Ernault (born 20 April 1977) is a French weightlifter. He competed in the men's lightweight event at the 2004 Summer Olympics.
