= Rudik Petrosyan =

Armenian weightlifter

Rudik Petrosyan (Armenian: Ռուդիկ Պէտրոսյան; born October 18, 1980, in Leninakan, Armenian SSR) is an Armenian retired weightlifter. He competed at the 2000 Summer Olympics in the men's 69 kg division.
