= Valerios Leonidis =

Greek weightlifter (born 1966)

Personal information
- Nationality: Greek
- Born: Valery Leonov; 14 February 1966 (age 60) Yessentuki, Russian SFSR, Soviet Union
- Height: 1.66 m (5 ft 5 1/2 in)

Sport
- Country: Greece
- Sport: Weightlifting
Medal record
Men's weightlifting
Representing Greece
Olympic Games
Silver medal – second place	1996 Atlanta	-64 kg
World Championships
Silver medal – second place	1994 Istanbul	-64 kg
Silver medal – second place	1995 Guangzhou	-64 kg
Bronze medal – third place	1999 Athens	-69 kg
European Championships
Gold medal – first place	1996 Stavanger	-64 kg
Silver medal – second place	1993 Sofia	-64 kg
Silver medal – second place	1994 Sokolov	-64 kg
Silver medal – second place	1995 Warsaw	-64 kg
Bronze medal – third place	1999 A Coruña	-69 kg
Representing Soviet Union
USSR Weightlifting Championships
Gold medal – first place	1986 Moscow	-60 kg
Gold medal – first place	1991 Donetsk	-60 kg
Summer Spartakiad of the USSR
Gold medal – first place	1986 Moscow	-60 kg
Gold medal – first place	1991 Donetsk	-60 kg

Valerios Leonidis (Greek: Βαλέριος Λεωνίδης; born 14 February 1966) is a Greek former Olympic medalist weightlifter and current weightlifting trainer. He won Olympic silver medal at 1996 Atlanta Olympic games in 64 kg division, as well as two silver and one bronze World Championship medals. He has competed in different weight classes from 60 kg to 69 kg. His rivalry with world-record holder Naim Süleymanoğlu in the men's 64 kg was a very popular part of the 1996 Olympic Games in Atlanta, in which he won the silver medal.

Leonidis was born in Yessentuki, Russia, to a Pontic Greek family. He was a member of the national weightlifting team of the Soviet Union from 1982 to 1990 and he moved to Greece in 1991. He was named the 1994 Greek Male Athlete of the Year.
