= Plamen Zhelyazkov =

Bulgarian weightlifter

Personal information
- Full name: Plamen Jelyazkov
- Born: 14 May 1972 (age 54) Asenovgrad, Bulgaria
- Height: 170 cm (5 ft 7 in)
- Weight: 77 kg (170 lb)

Sport
- Country: Bulgaria
- Sport: Weightlifting
- Weight class: 77 kg
- Club: Asenovets, Asenovgrad (BUL)
Medal record
Representing Bulgaria
World Championships
Gold medal – first place	1998 Lahti	-69 kg
Bronze medal – third place	1999 Athens	-77 kg
European Championships
Gold medal – first place	1998 Riesa	-69 kg
Silver medal – second place	1996 Stavanger	-70 kg
Silver medal – second place	1999 La Coruna	-69 kg
Silver medal – second place	2000 Sofia	-77 kg
Bronze medal – third place	1997 Rijeka	-70 kg
Bronze medal – third place	2004 Kyiv	-77 kg
- Updated on 13 September 2016

Plamen Jelyazkov (original name: Пламен Желязков, born 14 May 1972 in Asenovgrad) is a Bulgarian male weightlifter, competing in the 77 kg category and representing Bulgaria at international competitions. He participated at the 1996 Summer Olympics in the 70 kg event. He competed at world championships, most recently at the 2003 World Weightlifting Championships.

Zhelyazkov became IWF World Weightlifter of the Year in 1998. He set five world records in the lightweight and middleweight classes from 1998-2002 – three in the snatch and two in the total.

== Major results ==
Year	Venue	Weight	Snatch (kg)				Clean & Jerk (kg)				Total	Rank
Year	Venue	Weight	1	2	3	Rank	1	2	3	Rank	Total	Rank
Summer Olympics
1996	Atlanta, United States	70 kg	~~150.0~~	150.0	155.0	—N/a	180.0	~~185.0~~	~~185.0~~	—N/a		4
World Championships
2003	Vancouver, Canada	77 kg	~~160~~	~~160~~	160	5	190	~~195~~	~~197.5~~	6	350	4
2002	Warsaw, Poland	77 kg	~~165~~	~~165~~	~~170~~	---	195	~~202.5~~	~~207.5~~	5	0	---
2001	Antalya, Turkey	77 kg	165	~~170~~	~~170~~	1st place, gold medalist(s)	~~195~~	~~195~~	195	5	360	4
1999	Piraeus, Greece	77 kg	160	165	170	2nd place, silver medalist(s)	~~197.5~~	197.5	200	7	370	3rd place, bronze medalist(s)
1998	Lahti, Finland	69 kg	155	~~160~~	160	1st place, gold medalist(s)	182.5	187.5	190	1st place, gold medalist(s)	350	1st place, gold medalist(s)
