= Fadel Nasser Sarouf =

Bulgarian-Qatari weightlifter

Personal information
- Born: 29 October 1972 (age 53)

Fadel Nasser Sarouf, born Valentin Sarov (Bulgarian: Валентин Саров) on 17 April 1976 in Bulgaria, is a naturalized Qatari weightlifter who competed in the men's 77 kg weight class at the 1999 World Weightlifting Championships, finishing eighth.

One of eight Bulgarian weightlifters recruited by the Qatar Olympic Committee for $1,000,000, Sarouf became a Qatari citizen in order to represent the country, changing his name from Valentin Sarov in the process.
