= Georgios Tzelilis =

Greek weightlifter (born 1973)

Personal information
- Nationality: Greek
- Born: 13 January 1973 (age 53) Vlorë, Albania

Sport
- Country: Greece
- Sport: Weightlifting
Medal record
Representing Greece
World Championships
Silver medal – second place	1999 Athens	-69 kg
European Championships
Bronze medal – third place	1994 Sokolov	-59 kg

Georgios Tzelilis (born 13 January 1973) is a Greek weightlifter. He competed in the men's featherweight event at the 1996 Summer Olympics and he was fourth. He tied with Xiao Jiangang with 322,5 kilos in total, but he was placed fourth because he was heavier than him Tzelilis missed 2000 Summer Olympics and 2004 Summer Olympics due to injuries. He was married with Mirela Manjani from 1997 to 2002.
