= Siarhei Laurenau =

Belarusian weightlifter (born 1972)

Personal information
- Born: August 16, 1972 (age 53) Vitebsk, Byelorussian SSR, USSR
Medal record
Men's Weightlifting
Representing Belarus
Olympic Games
Bronze medal – third place	2000 Sydney	– 69 kg
European Championships
Gold medal – first place	2000 Sofia	– 69 kg
Bronze medal – third place	1992 Szekszard	– 60 kg
Bronze medal – third place	1998 Riesa	– 69 kg
Bronze medal – third place	2004 Kyiv	– 69 kg

Sergey Lavrenov (Russian: Сергей Лавренов; born August 16, 1972) is a retired weightlifter from Belarus, who competed in the men's lightweight class weight (– 69 kg) at the 2000 Summer Olympics and won a bronze medal. He also competed at the 2004 Summer Olympics in Athens, Greece.
