= François Demeure =

Belgian weightlifter

Personal information
- Nationality: Belgian
- Born: 25 June 1975 (age 49); Charleroi, Belgium

Sport
- Sport: Weightlifting

François Demeure (born 25 June 1975) is a Belgian weightlifter. He competed in the men's lightweight event at the 2000 Summer Olympics.
