= Wan Jianhui =

Chinese weightlifter

Personal information
- Full name: Wan Jianhui
- Born: 1 January 1975 (age 51)
- Height: 166 cm (5 ft 5 in)
- Weight: 68.87 kg (151.8 lb)

Sport
- Country: China
- Sport: Weightlifting
- Weight class: 69 kg
- Team: National team
- Updated on 2 October 2016

Wan Jianhui also written as Wan Jianghui (original name: 萬 建輝, born 1 January 1975) is a Chinese male weightlifter, competing in the 69 kg category and representing China at international competitions. He participated at the 1996 Summer Olympics in the 70 kg event and at the 2000 Summer Olympics in the 69 kg event. He competed at world championships, most recently at the 1999 World Weightlifting Championships.

He set one lightweight snatch world record.

== Major results ==
(bronze) - 1998 Asian Games Lightweight class.

Year	Venue	Weight	Snatch (kg)				Clean & Jerk (kg)				Total	Rank
Year	Venue	Weight	1	2	3	Rank	1	2	3	Rank	Total	Rank
Summer Olympics
2000	Sydney, Australia	69 kg				—N/a				—N/a		DNF
1996	Atlanta, United States	70 kg				—N/a				—N/a		7
World Championships
1999	Piraeus, Greece	69 kg	~~152.5~~	~~152.5~~	~~152.5~~	---	180	~~187.5~~	~~187.5~~	13	-	---
1998	Lahti, Finland	69 kg	152.5	158	~~160~~	2nd place, silver medalist(s)	182.5	~~187.5~~	~~187.5~~	7	340	3rd place, bronze medalist(s)
1997	Chiang Mai, Thailand	70 kg	152.5	155.0	~~157.5~~	3rd place, bronze medalist(s)	185.0	~~187.5~~	~~187.5~~	4	340.0	3rd place, bronze medalist(s)
