= Kim Hak-bong (weightlifter) =

South Korean weightlifter

Personal information
- Full name: Kim Hak-bong
- Born: 1 January 1973 (age 53)
- Height: 168 cm (5 ft 6 in)
- Weight: 68.67 kg (151.4 lb)

Sport
- Country: South Korea
- Sport: Weightlifting
- Weight class: 69 kg
- Team: National team
- Updated on 3 October 2016

Kim Hak-bong (Korean: 김학봉, born 1 January 1973) is a South Korean male weightlifter, competing in the 69 kg category and representing South Korea at international competitions. He participated at the 2000 Summer Olympics in the 69 kg event. He competed at world championships, most recently at the 1999 World Weightlifting Championships.

He set one lightweight clean & jerk world record in 1998.

== Major results ==
(silver) - 1994 Asian Games Middleweight class
(gold) - 1998 Asian Games Lightweight class

Year	Venue	Weight	Snatch (kg)				Clean & Jerk (kg)				Total	Rank
Year	Venue	Weight	1	2	3	Rank	1	2	3	Rank	Total	Rank
Summer Olympics
2000	Sydney, Australia	69 kg				—N/a				—N/a		8
World Championships
1999	Piraeus, Greece	69 kg	140	145	~~150~~	13	180	~~187.5~~	~~187.5~~	10	325	10
