= Sébastien Groulx =

Canadian weightlifter (1974–2025)

Personal information
- Born: 29 October 1974 Saint-Hyacinthe, Quebec, Canada
- Died: 20 June 2025 (aged 50) near Natashquan, Quebec, Canada

Sport
- Sport: Weightlifting
Medal record
Representing Canada
Commonwealth Games
Gold medal – first place	1998 Kuala Lumpur	Snatch
Gold medal – first place	1998 Kuala Lumpur	Total
Silver medal – second place	1998 Kuala Lumpur	Clean & jerk

Sébastien Groulx (French: [sebastjɛ̃ gʁu]; 29 October 1974 – 20 June 2025) was a Canadian weightlifter. He competed in the men's lightweight event at the 2000 Summer Olympics.

Groulx and three others died on 20 June 2025 when the medical helicopter he was travelling on crashed near Natashquan, Quebec. He was 50.
