= Yoshihisa Miyaji =

Japanese weightlifter (born 1973)

Personal information
- Nationality: Japanese
- Born: 19 July 1973 (age 51)

Sport
- Sport: Weightlifting

Yoshihisa Miyaji (宮地 由久, Miyaji Yoshihisa; born 19 July 1973) is a Japanese weightlifter. He competed at the 1996 Summer Olympics and the 2000 Summer Olympics.
