= Weightlifting at the 2002 Asian Games =

- Venue: Pukyong National University Gymnasium
- Dates: 30 September – 10 October 2002
- Competitors: 143 from 30 nations

Weightlifting was contested from September 30 to October 10 at the 2002 Asian Games in Pukyong National University Gymnasium, Busan, South Korea.

== Schedule ==
A	Group A

Event↓/Date →	30th Mon	1st Tue	2nd Wed	3rd Thu	4th Fri	5th Sat	6th Sun	7th Mon	8th Tue	9th Wed	10th Thu
Men's 56 kg		A									
Men's 62 kg			A								
Men's 69 kg				A							
Men's 77 kg					A						
Men's 85 kg								A			
Men's 94 kg									A		
Men's 105 kg										A	
Men's +105 kg											A
Women's 48 kg	A										
Women's 53 kg		A									
Women's 58 kg			A								
Women's 63 kg				A							
Women's 69 kg							A				
Women's 75 kg								A			
Women's +75 kg									A		

== Medalists ==
=== Men ===
Event	Gold	Silver	Bronze
56 kg	Wu Meijin; China	Wang Shin-yuan; Chinese Taipei	Yang Chin-yi; Chinese Taipei
62 kg	Le Maosheng; China	Im Yong-su; North Korea	Cho Hyo-won; South Korea
69 kg	Zhang Guozheng; China	Erwin Abdullah; Indonesia	Mehdi Panzvan; Iran
77 kg	Sergey Filimonov; Kazakhstan	Mohammad Hossein Barkhah; Iran	Mohammad Ali Falahatinejad; Iran
85 kg	Song Jong-shik; South Korea	Hadi Panzvan; Iran	Bakhtiyor Nurullaev; Uzbekistan
94 kg	Bakhyt Akhmetov; Kazakhstan	Kourosh Bagheri; Iran	Lee Ung-jo; South Korea
105 kg	Said Saif Asaad; Qatar	Cui Wenhua; China	Hossein Tavakkoli; Iran
+105 kg	Hossein Rezazadeh; Iran	Igor Khalilov; Uzbekistan	Munehiro Morita; Japan

=== Women ===
Event	Gold	Silver	Bronze
48 kg	Li Zhuo; China	Kay Thi Win; Myanmar	Raema Lisa Rumbewas; Indonesia
53 kg	Ri Song-hui; North Korea	Udomporn Polsak; Thailand	Meng Xianjuan; China
58 kg	Zhou Yan; China	Wandee Kameaim; Thailand	Tanti Pratiwi; Indonesia
63 kg	Liu Xia; China	Khin Moe Nwe; Myanmar	Kuo Ping-chun; Chinese Taipei
69 kg	Liu Chunhong; China	Pawina Thongsuk; Thailand	Mya Sanda Oo; Myanmar
75 kg	Sun Ruiping; China	Tatyana Khromova; Kazakhstan	Kim Soon-hee; South Korea
+75 kg	Tang Gonghong; China	Jang Mi-ran; South Korea	Moon Kyung-ae; South Korea

== Medal table ==
Rank	Nation	Gold	Silver	Bronze	Total
1	China (CHN)	9	1	1	11
2	Kazakhstan (KAZ)	2	1	0	3
3	Iran (IRI)	1	3	3	7
4	South Korea (KOR)	1	1	4	6
5	North Korea (PRK)	1	1	0	2
6	Qatar (QAT)	1	0	0	1
7	Thailand (THA)	0	3	0	3
8	Myanmar (MYA)	0	2	1	3
9	Chinese Taipei (TPE)	0	1	2	3
9	Indonesia (INA)	0	1	2	3
11	Uzbekistan (UZB)	0	1	1	2
12	Japan (JPN)	0	0	1	1
Totals (12 entries)		15	15	15	45

== Participating nations ==
A total of 143 athletes from 30 nations competed in weightlifting at the 2002 Asian Games:

- Bahrain (3)
- Bangladesh (1)
- China (15)
- Chinese Taipei (10)
- India (5)
- Indonesia (5)
- Iran (8)
- Japan (12)
- Jordan (1)
- Kazakhstan (9)
- Kuwait (1)
- Kyrgyzstan (3)
- Lebanon (2)
- Malaysia (1)
- Mongolia (4)
- Myanmar (7)
- Nepal (2)
- North Korea (6)
- Pakistan (3)
- Philippines (2)
- Qatar (4)
- South Korea (15)
- Syria (1)
- Tajikistan (1)
- Thailand (8)
- Timor-Leste (1)
- Turkmenistan (2)
- Uzbekistan (6)
- Vietnam (3)
- Yemen (2)
