= 1999 World Weightlifting Championships – Women's +75 kg =

The Women's Super Heavyweight Weightlifting Event (+ 75 kg) is the heaviest women's weight class event at the weightlifting competition, open to competitors over 75 kilograms of body mass. The competition at the 1999 World Weightlifting Championships took place in Athens, Greece on November 27, 1999.

Each lifter performed in both the snatch and clean and jerk lifts, with the final score being the sum of the lifter's best result in each. The athlete received three attempts in each of the two lifts; the score for the lift was the heaviest weight successfully lifted.

== Medalists ==
| Event | Gold | | Silver | | Bronze | |
|---|---|---|---|---|---|---|
| Snatch | Ding Meiyuan (CHN) | 127.5 kg | Agata Wróbel (POL) | 127.5 kg | Cheryl Haworth (USA) | 115.0 kg |
| Clean & Jerk | Ding Meiyuan (CHN) | 157.5 kg | Agata Wróbel (POL) | 152.5 kg | Chen Hsiao-lien (TPE) | 142.5 kg |
| Total | Ding Meiyuan (CHN) | 285.0 kg | Agata Wróbel (POL) | 280.0 kg | Balkisu Musa (NGR) | 252.5 kg |

== Records ==
Prior to this competition, the existing world records were as follows.

| World record | Snatch | Agata Wróbel (POL) | 125.0 kg | Spała, Poland | 26 September 1999 |
| World record | Clean & Jerk | Ding Meiyuan (CHN) | 156.0 kg | Chiba, Japan | 3 May 1999 |
| World record | Total | Ding Meiyuan (CHN) | 275.0 kg | Chiba, Japan | 3 May 1999 |

== Results ==
| Rank | Athlete | Body weight | Snatch (kg) | | | | Clean & Jerk (kg) | | | | Total |
| Rank | Athlete | Body weight | 1 | 2 | 3 | Rank | 1 | 2 | 3 | Rank | Total |
|---|---|---|---|---|---|---|---|---|---|---|---|
| 1st place, gold medalist(s) | Ding Meiyuan (CHN) | 97.00 | 120.0 | 125.0 | 127.5 | 1st place, gold medalist(s) | 150.0 | 155.0 | 157.5 | 1st place, gold medalist(s) | 285.0 |
| 2nd place, silver medalist(s) | Agata Wróbel (POL) | 117.11 | ~~117.5~~ | 120.0 | 127.5 | 2nd place, silver medalist(s) | ~~142.5~~ | 145.0 | 152.5 | 2nd place, silver medalist(s) | 280.0 |
| 3rd place, bronze medalist(s) | Balkisu Musa (NGR) | 82.21 | 105.0 | 110.0 | 112.5 | 4 | 130.0 | 135.0 | 140.0 | 4 | 252.5 |
| 4 | Cheryl Haworth (USA) | 132.50 | 107.5 | ~~112.5~~ | 115.0 | 3rd place, bronze medalist(s) | 125.0 | 132.5 | 137.5 | 7 | 252.5 |
| 5 | Carmenza Delgado (COL) | 89.86 | 105.0 | 110.0 | 112.5 | 5 | 130.0 | 135.0 | 137.5 | 5 | 250.0 |
| 6 | Moon Kyung-ae (KOR) | 92.89 | 100.0 | 105.0 | ~~107.5~~ | 10 | 127.5 | 132.5 | 137.5 | 6 | 242.5 |
| 7 | Vita Rudenok (UKR) | 101.46 | 105.0 | 110.0 | ~~112.5~~ | 6 | 130.0 | ~~135.0~~ | ~~137.5~~ | 10 | 240.0 |
| 8 | Helen Idahosa (NGR) | 87.96 | 95.0 | 100.0 | 105.0 | 8 | 120.0 | ~~130.0~~ | 130.0 | 8 | 235.0 |
| 9 | Viktoriya Shaimardanova (UKR) | 91.31 | ~~105.0~~ | ~~105.0~~ | 105.0 | 9 | 125.0 | 130.0 | ~~135.0~~ | 9 | 235.0 |
| 10 | Melinda Szik (HUN) | 93.75 | 105.0 | ~~110.0~~ | ~~110.0~~ | 11 | 122.5 | 127.5 | ~~132.5~~ | 11 | 232.5 |
| 11 | Venera Mannanova (RUS) | 79.58 | 100.0 | 105.0 | 107.5 | 7 | 112.5 | 117.5 | 120.0 | 14 | 227.5 |
| 12 | Olivia Baker (NZL) | 99.17 | 95.0 | ~~100.0~~ | 100.0 | 14 | 120.0 | ~~125.0~~ | 125.0 | 13 | 225.0 |
| 13 | Kim Dong-ok (KOR) | 111.17 | ~~100.0~~ | ~~100.0~~ | 105.0 | 12 | ~~120.0~~ | 120.0 | ~~132.5~~ | 16 | 225.0 |
| 14 | Lourdes Gorostegui (ESP) | 97.17 | 95.0 | ~~100.0~~ | 100.0 | 13 | 115.0 | 120.0 | ~~125.0~~ | 15 | 220.0 |
| 15 | Miyuki Arai (JPN) | 86.97 | ~~92.5~~ | ~~92.5~~ | 92.5 | 17 | 120.0 | ~~125.0~~ | 125.0 | 12 | 217.5 |
| 16 | Sylvie Iskin (FRA) | 95.74 | 95.0 | ~~97.5~~ | ~~100.0~~ | 16 | ~~115.0~~ | 117.5 | ~~120.0~~ | 17 | 212.5 |
| 17 | Claudia Mues (DEN) | 92.71 | ~~92.5~~ | 92.5 | 95.0 | 15 | 107.5 | ~~112.5~~ | ~~112.5~~ | 21 | 202.5 |
| 18 | Susanne Dandenault (CAN) | 100.59 | ~~85.0~~ | 85.0 | 90.0 | 20 | ~~112.5~~ | 112.5 | ~~117.5~~ | 18 | 202.5 |
| 19 | Diana Back (FIN) | 77.51 | 87.5 | ~~90.0~~ | 90.0 | 18 | 105.0 | ~~110.0~~ | 110.0 | 20 | 200.0 |
| 20 | Reanna Solomon (NRU) | 121.46 | ~~80.0~~ | ~~80.0~~ | 80.0 | 23 | 107.5 | 112.5 | ~~115.0~~ | 19 | 192.5 |
| 21 | Nancy Ponce (MEX) | 79.30 | 80.0 | 85.0 | ~~87.5~~ | 21 | 100.0 | 105.0 | ~~107.5~~ | 22 | 190.0 |
| 22 | Rosa Magro (ITA) | 96.19 | 75.0 | 80.0 | 82.5 | 22 | 95.0 | 100.0 | 102.5 | 23 | 185.0 |
| 23 | Olga Solovieva (KAZ) | 81.16 | ~~70.0~~ | 70.0 | ~~75.0~~ | 24 | ~~90.0~~ | ~~90.0~~ | 90.0 | 24 | 160.0 |
| — | Sheeva Peo (NRU) | 86.39 | 85.0 | ~~90.0~~ | 90.0 | 19 | ~~112.5~~ | ~~112.5~~ | ~~112.5~~ | — | — |
| — | Katarina Sederholm (NOR) | 94.35 | ~~100.0~~ | ~~100.0~~ | ~~100.0~~ | — | — | — | — | — | — |
| — | Chen Hsiao-lien (TPE) | 100.64 | ~~105.0~~ | ~~105.0~~ | ~~105.0~~ | — | 137.5 | 142.5 | ~~145.0~~ | 3rd place, bronze medalist(s) | — |

== New records ==
| Snatch | 127.5 kg | Agata Wróbel (POL) | WR |
| Clean & Jerk | 157.5 kg | Ding Meiyuan (CHN) | WR |
| Total | 277.5 kg | Ding Meiyuan (CHN) | WR |
| Total | 280.0 kg | Agata Wróbel (POL) | WR |
| Total | 282.5 kg | Ding Meiyuan (CHN) | WR |
| Total | 285.0 kg | Ding Meiyuan (CHN) | WR |
