= 2002 World Weightlifting Championships – Women's +75 kg =

The 2002 World Weightlifting Championships were held in Warsaw, Poland from 19 November to 26 November. The women's +75 kilograms division was staged on 24 November 2002.

== Schedule ==
Date	Time	Event
24 November 2002	10:00	Group B
24 November 2002	14:00	Group A

== Medalists ==
Event	Gold		Silver		Bronze	
Snatch	Albina Khomich (RUS)	132.5 kg	Agata Wróbel (POL)	125.0 kg	Cheryl Haworth (USA)	125.0 kg
Clean & Jerk	Agata Wróbel (POL)	162.5 kg	Tang Gonghong (CHN)	160.0 kg	Cheryl Haworth (USA)	152.5 kg
Total	Agata Wróbel (POL)	287.5 kg	Albina Khomich (RUS)	282.5 kg	Tang Gonghong (CHN)	277.5 kg

== Records ==
Prior to this competition, the existing world records were as follows.

World Record	Snatch	Ding Meiyuan (CHN)	135.0 kg	Sydney, Australia	22 September 2000
World Record	Clean & Jerk	Tang Gonghong (CHN)	167.5 kg	Busan, South Korea	8 October 2002
World Record	Total	Ding Meiyuan (CHN)	300.0 kg	Sydney, Australia	22 September 2000

== Results ==
Rank	Athlete	Group	Body weight	Snatch (kg)				Clean & Jerk (kg)				Total
Rank	Athlete	Group	Body weight	1	2	3	Rank	1	2	3	Rank	Total
1st place, gold medalist(s)	Agata Wróbel (POL)	A	116.95	~~120.0~~	120.0	125.0	2nd place, silver medalist(s)	155.0	160.0	162.5	1st place, gold medalist(s)	287.5
2nd place, silver medalist(s)	Albina Khomich (RUS)	A	98.65	125.0	130.0	132.5	1st place, gold medalist(s)	150.0	~~155.0~~	~~155.0~~	5	282.5
3rd place, bronze medalist(s)	Tang Gonghong (CHN)	A	120.10	117.5	~~122.5~~	~~122.5~~	7	160.0	~~167.5~~	~~167.5~~	2nd place, silver medalist(s)	277.5
4	Cheryl Haworth (USA)	A	138.70	117.5	122.5	125.0	3rd place, bronze medalist(s)	152.5	~~157.5~~	~~160.0~~	3rd place, bronze medalist(s)	277.5
5	Viktória Varga (HUN)	A	90.90	~~120.0~~	120.0	~~125.0~~	4	150.0	~~157.5~~	~~157.5~~	4	270.0
6	Vasiliki Kasapi (GRE)	A	115.65	115.0	~~120.0~~	120.0	5	~~140.0~~	140.0	145.0	6	265.0
7	Viktoriya Shaimardanova (UKR)	A	92.70	110.0	115.0	117.5	6	135.0	140.0	~~145.0~~	8	257.5
8	Olha Korobka (UKR)	A	141.85	105.0	~~110.0~~	110.0	9	135.0	140.0	~~145.0~~	9	250.0
9	Oliba Nieve (ECU)	A	87.55	105.0	110.0	~~115.0~~	8	130.0	135.0	~~140.0~~	10	245.0
10	Monique Riesterer (GER)	B	92.70	102.5	107.5	~~110.0~~	10	127.5	132.5	135.0	11	242.5
11	Derya Açikgöz (TUR)	A	88.90	~~100.0~~	~~100.0~~	100.0	12	140.0	~~145.0~~	~~145.0~~	7	240.0
12	Lyudmila Kanunova (KAZ)	B	97.80	105.0	~~110.0~~	~~110.0~~	11	130.0	~~135.0~~	135.0	12	240.0
13	Theano Katsidi (GRE)	B	98.05	100.0	~~105.0~~	~~105.0~~	13	127.5	~~135.0~~	135.0	13	235.0
14	Susanne Dandenault (CAN)	B	113.25	~~90.0~~	90.0	95.0	15	117.5	122.5	~~127.5~~	15	217.5
15	Marta Dreger (POL)	B	86.35	95.0	~~100.0~~	~~100.0~~	14	110.0	117.5	~~122.5~~	16	212.5
16	Zuzana Kováčová (SVK)	B	91.65	87.5	90.0	~~92.5~~	16	117.5	122.5	~~125.0~~	14	212.5
17	Christina Strovolidou (CYP)	B	87.40	~~67.5~~	67.5	~~72.5~~	17	85.0	90.0	95.0	17	162.5
