= Weightlifting at the 2000 Summer Olympics – Women's +75 kg =

Weightlifting at the Olympics

Women's +75 kg at the Games of the XXVII Olympiad
- Venue: Sydney Convention and Exhibition Centre
- Date: 22 September 2000
- Competitors: 11 from 11 nations

Medalists
1st place, gold medalist(s)		Ding Meiyuan	China
2nd place, silver medalist(s)		Agata Wróbel	Poland
3rd place, bronze medalist(s)		Cheryl Haworth	United States

The women's +75 kilograms weightlifting event at the 2000 Summer Olympics in Sydney, Australia took place at the Sydney Convention and Exhibition Centre on September 19.

Total score was the sum of the lifter's best result in each of the snatch and the clean and jerk, with three lifts allowed for each lift. In case of a tie, the lighter lifter won; if still tied, the lifter who took the fewest attempts to achieve the total score won. Lifters without a valid snatch score did not perform the clean and jerk.

== Schedule ==
All times are Australian Eastern Time (UTC+10:00)

Date	Time	Event
22 September 2000	14:30	Group A

== Records ==
Prior to this competition, the existing world and Olympic records were as follows.

World Record	Snatch	Agata Wróbel (POL)	130.0 kg	Prague, Czech Republic	8 July 2000
World Record	Clean & Jerk	Wang Yanmei (CHN)	161.0 kg	Montreal, Canada	11 June 2000
World Record	Total	Agata Wróbel (POL)	290.0 kg	Prague, Czech Republic	8 July 2000
Olympic Record	Snatch	Olympic Standard	130.0 kg	—	1 January 1997
Olympic Record	Clean & Jerk	Olympic Standard	160.0 kg	—	1 January 1997
Olympic Record	Total	Olympic Standard	290.0 kg	—	1 January 1997

== Results ==
Rank	Athlete	Group	Body weight	Snatch (kg)				Clean & Jerk (kg)				Total
Rank	Athlete	Group	Body weight	1	2	3	Result	1	2	3	Result	Total
1st place, gold medalist(s)	Ding Meiyuan (CHN)	A	103.56	130.0	~~135.0~~	135.0	135.0	157.5	162.5	165.0	165.0	300.0
2nd place, silver medalist(s)	Agata Wróbel (POL)	A	119.42	~~125.0~~	125.0	132.5	132.5	155.0	162.5	~~170.0~~	162.5	295.0
3rd place, bronze medalist(s)	Cheryl Haworth (USA)	A	139.38	117.5	122.5	125.0	125.0	140.0	142.5	145.0	145.0	270.0
4	Carmenza Delgado (COL)	A	91.78	110.0	~~115.0~~	115.0	115.0	140.0	145.0	~~147.5~~	145.0	260.0
5	Helen Idahosa (NGR)	A	97.04	~~110.0~~	110.0	~~115.0~~	110.0	135.0	140.0	~~145.0~~	140.0	250.0
6	Monique Riesterer (GER)	A	93.52	105.0	110.0	112.5	112.5	127.5	132.5	~~137.5~~	132.5	245.0
7	Moon Kyung-ae (KOR)	A	94.52	110.0	~~115.0~~	~~115.0~~	110.0	135.0	~~147.5~~	~~147.5~~	135.0	245.0
8	Olivia Baker (NZL)	A	94.74	100.0	~~105.0~~	105.0	105.0	125.0	~~130.0~~	130.0	130.0	235.0
9	Melinda Szik (HUN)	A	97.30	~~102.5~~	102.5	107.5	107.5	122.5	~~127.5~~	127.5	127.5	235.0
10	Sheeva Peo (NRU)	A	92.34	92.5	~~97.5~~	97.5	97.5	122.5	~~127.5~~	~~127.5~~	122.5	220.0
—	Vita Rudenok (UKR)	A	106.98	105.0	110.0	115.0	115.0	—	—	—	—	—

== New records ==
Snatch	132.5 kg	Agata Wróbel (POL)	WR
Snatch	135.0 kg	Ding Meiyuan (CHN)	WR
Clean & Jerk	162.5 kg	Agata Wróbel (POL)	WR
Clean & Jerk	165.0 kg	Ding Meiyuan (CHN)	WR
Total	292.5 kg	Ding Meiyuan (CHN)	WR
Total	295.0 kg	Agata Wróbel (POL)	WR
Total	297.5 kg	Ding Meiyuan (CHN)	WR
Total	300.0 kg	Ding Meiyuan (CHN)	WR
