= 1998 World Weightlifting Championships – Women's +75 kg =

The 1998 World Weightlifting Championships were held in Lahti, Finland from November 7 to November 15. The women's competition in the super-heavyweight (+75 kg) division was staged on 14 November 1998.

== Medalists ==
Event	Gold		Silver		Bronze	
Snatch	Agata Wróbel (POL)	115.0 kg	María Isabel Urrutia (COL)	110.0 kg	Tang Gonghong (CHN)	110.0 kg
Clean & Jerk	Tang Gonghong (CHN)	145.0 kg	Chen Hsiao-lien (TPE)	140.0 kg	María Isabel Urrutia (COL)	132.5 kg
Total	Tang Gonghong (CHN)	255.0 kg	Chen Hsiao-lien (TPE)	245.0 kg	María Isabel Urrutia (COL)	242.5 kg

== Records ==
Prior to this competition, the existing world records were as follows.

World record	Snatch	Zhang Nan (CHN)	118.5 kg	Sofia, Bulgaria	24 May 1998
World record	Clean & Jerk	Ding Meiyuan (CHN)	155.5 kg	Ramat Gan, Israel	24 April 1998
World record	Total	Ding Meiyuan (CHN)	267.5 kg	Ramat Gan, Israel	24 April 1998

== Results ==
Rank	Athlete	Body weight	Snatch (kg)				Clean & Jerk (kg)				Total
Rank	Athlete	Body weight	1	2	3	Rank	1	2	3	Rank	Total
1st place, gold medalist(s)	Tang Gonghong (CHN)	114.91	105.0	110.0	~~115.0~~	3rd place, bronze medalist(s)	~~145.0~~	145.0	~~156.0~~	1st place, gold medalist(s)	255.0
2nd place, silver medalist(s)	Chen Hsiao-lien (TPE)	99.17	100.0	105.0	~~110.0~~	4	~~140.0~~	140.0	~~145.0~~	2nd place, silver medalist(s)	245.0
3rd place, bronze medalist(s)	María Isabel Urrutia (COL)	88.53	105.0	110.0	~~112.5~~	2nd place, silver medalist(s)	~~130.0~~	130.0	132.5	3rd place, bronze medalist(s)	242.5
4	Agata Wróbel (POL)	108.70	107.5	112.5	115.0	1st place, gold medalist(s)	~~127.5~~	127.5	~~132.5~~	6	242.5
5	Monique Riesterer (GER)	90.01	100.0	~~105.0~~	~~105.0~~	7	125.0	132.5	~~135.0~~	4	232.5
6	Vita Rudenok (UKR)	93.38	95.0	100.0	102.5	5	122.5	~~127.5~~	127.5	5	230.0
7	Katarina Sederholm (NOR)	91.62	92.5	97.5	~~100.0~~	8	120.0	~~125.0~~	125.0	7	222.5
8	Viktoriya Shaimardanova (UKR)	85.49	95.0	100.0	~~102.5~~	6	115.0	120.0	~~122.5~~	9	220.0
9	Lourdes Gorostegui (ESP)	94.24	~~92.5~~	92.5	97.5	9	~~120.0~~	120.0	~~125.0~~	10	217.5
10	Erika Takács (HUN)	99.97	95.0	~~97.5~~	~~97.5~~	11	122.5	~~127.5~~	~~127.5~~	8	217.5
11	Sylvie Iskin (FRA)	95.24	87.5	92.5	95.0	10	112.5	117.5	~~120.0~~	11	212.5
12	Theresa Brick (CAN)	78.71	80.5	85.0	87.5	12	105.0	~~110.0~~	~~110.0~~	13	192.5
13	Sheeva Peo (NRU)	86.56	80.0	85.0	~~90.0~~	13	~~105.0~~	105.0	~~110.0~~	14	190.0
14	Susanne Dandenault (CAN)	103.16	77.5	82.5	~~85.0~~	15	102.5	~~107.5~~	107.5	12	190.0
15	Claudia Mues (DEN)	92.97	85.0	~~90.0~~	~~90.0~~	14	~~102.5~~	102.5	~~107.5~~	16	187.5
16	Reanna Solomon (NRU)	120.89	70.0	~~75.0~~	75.0	16	105.0	~~110.0~~	~~110.0~~	15	180.0

== Bibliography ==
- Results
- Weightlifting World Championships Seniors Statistics, Page 14
