= Weightlifting at the 2002 Asian Games – Women's +75 kg =

Women's +75 kg at the 2002 Asian Games
- Venue: Pukyong National University Gymnasium
- Date: 8 October 2002
- Competitors: 6 from 4 nations

Medalists
gold medal	Tang Gonghong	China
silver medal	Jang Mi-ran	South Korea
bronze medal	Moon Kyung-ae	South Korea

The women's +75 kilograms event at the 2002 Asian Games took place on October 8, 2002 at Pukyong National University Gymnasium.

== Schedule ==
All times are Korea Standard Time (UTC+09:00)

Date	Time	Event
Tuesday, 8 October 2002	15:00	Group A

== Records ==
Prior to this competition, the existing world, Asian and Games records were as follows.

World Record	Snatch	Ding Meiyuan (CHN)	135.0 kg	Sydney, Australia	22 September 2000
World Record	Clean & Jerk	Ding Meiyuan (CHN)	165.0 kg	Sydney, Australia	22 September 2000
World Record	Total	Ding Meiyuan (CHN)	300.0 kg	Sydney, Australia	22 September 2000
Asian Record	Snatch	Ding Meiyuan (CHN)	135.0 kg	Sydney, Australia	22 September 2000
Asian Record	Clean & Jerk	Ding Meiyuan (CHN)	165.0 kg	Sydney, Australia	22 September 2000
Asian Record	Total	Ding Meiyuan (CHN)	300.0 kg	Sydney, Australia	22 September 2000
Games Record	Snatch	Ding Meiyuan (CHN)	120.0 kg	Bangkok, Thailand	13 December 1998
Games Record	Clean & Jerk	Ding Meiyuan (CHN)	150.0 kg	Bangkok, Thailand	13 December 1998
Games Record	Total	Ding Meiyuan (CHN)	270.0 kg	Bangkok, Thailand	13 December 1998

== Results ==
Legend

- NM — No mark

Rank	Athlete	Body weight	Snatch (kg)				Clean & Jerk (kg)				Total
Rank	Athlete	Body weight	1	2	3	Result	1	2	3	Result	Total
1st place, gold medalist(s)	Tang Gonghong (CHN)	124.60	115.0	120.0	~~130.0~~	120.0	160.0	165.5	167.5	167.5	287.5
2nd place, silver medalist(s)	Jang Mi-ran (KOR)	103.45	110.0	115.0	117.5	117.5	140.0	145.0	155.0	155.0	272.5
3rd place, bronze medalist(s)	Moon Kyung-ae (KOR)	95.70	110.0	112.5	~~115.0~~	112.5	~~140.0~~	140.0	~~145.0~~	140.0	252.5
4	Chen Hsiao-lien (TPE)	97.95	110.0	~~112.5~~	~~112.5~~	110.0	140.0	~~145.0~~	~~145.0~~	140.0	250.0
5	Kazue Imahoko (JPN)	79.75	~~95.0~~	~~95.0~~	95.0	95.0	112.5	117.5	120.0	120.0	215.0
—	Hsieh Su-hua (TPE)	119.10	110.0	~~112.5~~	~~112.5~~	110.0	~~145.0~~	~~145.0~~	~~145.0~~	—	NM

== New records ==
The following records were established during the competition.

Clean & Jerk	155.0	Jang Mi-ran (KOR)	GR
Clean & Jerk	160.0	Tang Gonghong (CHN)	GR
Clean & Jerk	165.5	Tang Gonghong (CHN)	WR
Clean & Jerk	167.5	Tang Gonghong (CHN)	WR
Total	272.5	Jang Mi-ran (KOR)	GR
Total	280.0	Tang Gonghong (CHN)	GR
Total	285.0	Tang Gonghong (CHN)	GR
Total	287.5	Tang Gonghong (CHN)	GR
