= 2003 World Weightlifting Championships – Women's +75 kg =

The 2003 World Weightlifting Championships were held in Vancouver, Canada from 14 November to 22 November. The women's +75 kilograms division was staged on 20 and 21 November 2003.

== Schedule ==
Date	Time	Event
20 November 2003	16:00	Group C
21 November 2003	12:30	Group B
21 November 2003	17:30	Group A

== Medalists ==
Event	Gold		Silver		Bronze	
Snatch	Ding Meiyuan (CHN)	137.5 kg	Albina Khomich (RUS)	130.0 kg	Olha Korobka (UKR)	125.0 kg
Clean & Jerk	Ding Meiyuan (CHN)	162.5 kg	Albina Khomich (RUS)	160.0 kg	Jang Mi-ran (KOR)	157.5 kg
Total	Ding Meiyuan (CHN)	300.0 kg	Albina Khomich (RUS)	290.0 kg	Olha Korobka (UKR)	277.5 kg

== Records ==
Prior to this competition, the existing world records were as follows.

World record	Snatch	Ding Meiyuan (CHN)	135.0 kg	Sydney, Australia	22 September 2000
World record	Clean & Jerk	Sun Dan (CHN)	168.5 kg	Hyderabad, India	31 October 2003
World record	Total	Ding Meiyuan (CHN)	300.0 kg	Sydney, Australia	22 September 2000

== Results ==
Rank	Athlete	Group	Body weight	Snatch (kg)				Clean & Jerk (kg)				Total
Rank	Athlete	Group	Body weight	1	2	3	Rank	1	2	3	Rank	Total
1st place, gold medalist(s)	Ding Meiyuan (CHN)	A	101.54	130.0	135.5	137.5	1st place, gold medalist(s)	160.0	162.5	~~169.0~~	1st place, gold medalist(s)	300.0
2nd place, silver medalist(s)	Albina Khomich (RUS)	A	103.73	130.0	~~136.0~~	~~136.0~~	2nd place, silver medalist(s)	150.0	155.0	160.0	2nd place, silver medalist(s)	290.0
3rd place, bronze medalist(s)	Olha Korobka (UKR)	A	152.08	115.0	120.0	125.0	3rd place, bronze medalist(s)	145.0	150.0	152.5	5	277.5
4	Viktória Varga (HUN)	A	94.67	115.0	120.0	~~125.0~~	5	145.0	150.0	152.5	4	272.5
5	Jang Mi-ran (KOR)	A	107.66	~~115.0~~	115.0	~~120.0~~	10	152.5	157.5	~~165.0~~	3rd place, bronze medalist(s)	272.5
6	Carmenza Delgado (COL)	A	94.22	117.5	122.5	~~125.0~~	4	142.5	~~147.5~~	147.5	7	270.0
7	Agata Wróbel (POL)	A	116.42	~~120.0~~	~~120.0~~	120.0	6	~~150.0~~	150.0	~~152.5~~	6	270.0
8	Viktoriya Shaimardanova (UKR)	B	88.45	112.5	117.5	~~120.0~~	7	135.0	142.5	145.0	8	262.5
9	Vasiliki Kasapi (GRE)	A	119.00	112.5	~~117.5~~	117.5	8	137.5	~~142.5~~	142.5	10	260.0
10	Oliba Nieve (ECU)	A	91.73	110.0	~~115.0~~	115.0	9	135.0	140.0	~~145.0~~	11	255.0
11	Derya Açikgöz (TUR)	A	96.29	105.0	~~110.0~~	110.0	11	142.5	~~150.0~~	~~150.0~~	9	252.5
12	Yordanka Apostolova (BUL)	B	94.58	100.0	105.0	~~110.0~~	15	125.0	135.0	140.0	12	245.0
13	Aikaterini Roditi (GRE)	B	100.44	102.5	107.5	~~112.5~~	12	125.0	130.0	~~135.0~~	15	237.5
14	Lyudmila Kanunova (KAZ)	B	96.71	100.0	105.0	~~110.0~~	16	130.0	~~135.0~~	~~135.0~~	14	235.0
15	Kazue Imahoko (JPN)	C	75.46	97.5	102.5	105.0	13	115.0	120.0	122.5	17	227.5
16	Annipa Moontar (THA)	B	95.63	95.0	~~100.0~~	~~100.0~~	22	125.0	130.0	132.5	13	227.5
17	María Carvajal (DOM)	B	80.45	97.5	102.5	~~105.0~~	17	~~122.5~~	122.5	~~127.5~~	19	225.0
18	Rachel Hearn (USA)	B	112.24	~~97.5~~	97.5	100.0	19	117.5	120.0	122.5	21	222.5
19	Nataliya Barysik (BLR)	C	77.88	95.0	~~100.0~~	~~100.0~~	21	115.0	120.0	122.5	18	217.5
20	Susanne Dandenault (CAN)	C	114.98	90.0	~~95.0~~	95.0	23	122.5	~~127.5~~	~~127.5~~	22	217.5
21	Reanna Solomon (NRU)	B	137.42	~~90.0~~	90.0	95.0	24	122.5	~~127.5~~	~~127.5~~	23	217.5
22	Doreen Heldt (USA)	C	77.18	97.5	100.0	~~102.5~~	18	110.0	115.0	~~120.0~~	25	215.0
23	Balkisu Musa (NGR)	B	89.86	~~97.5~~	~~97.5~~	97.5	20	117.5	~~122.5~~	~~122.5~~	24	215.0
24	Manuela Rejas (PER)	C	111.03	80.0	85.0	87.5	26	115.0	122.5	~~125.0~~	20	210.0
25	Rosetta Penani (NRU)	C	101.36	~~85.0~~	85.0	90.0	25	110.0	~~115.0~~	~~115.0~~	27	200.0
26	Verónica Mleziva (ESP)	C	98.27	75.0	80.0	~~82.5~~	27	~~102.5~~	102.5	110.0	26	190.0
27	Rosa Magro (ITA)	C	110.65	80.0	~~85.0~~	~~85.0~~	28	100.0	105.0	107.5	28	187.5
—	Katalin Laczi (HUN)	C	75.38	~~95.0~~	~~95.0~~	~~95.0~~	—	115.0	~~120.0~~	122.5	16	—
—	Sally El-Sayed (EGY)	B	76.90	100.0	105.0	~~107.5~~	14	~~122.5~~	~~122.5~~	~~122.5~~	—	—
—	Jana Volfová (CZE)	C	87.40	~~82.5~~	~~82.5~~	~~82.5~~	—	—	—	—	—	—

== New records ==
Snatch	135.5 kg	Ding Meiyuan (CHN)	WR
Snatch	137.5 kg	Ding Meiyuan (CHN)	WR
