= 1997 World Weightlifting Championships – Women's +83 kg =

The 1997 World Weightlifting Championships were held in Chiang Mai, Thailand from December 6 to December 14. The women's competition in the +83 kg division was staged on 13 December 1997.

== Medalists ==
Event	Gold		Silver		Bronze	
Snatch	Aye Aye Aung (MYA)	110.0 kg	Balkisu Musa (NGR)	107.5 kg	Ma Runmei (CHN)	107.5 kg
Clean & Jerk	Ma Runmei (CHN)	145.0 kg	Chen Hsiao-lien (TPE)	137.5 kg	Chen Shu-chih (TPE)	135.0 kg
Total	Ma Runmei (CHN)	252.5 kg	Chen Shu-chih (TPE)	240.0 kg	Aye Aye Aung (MYA)	240.0 kg

== Records ==
Prior to this competition, the existing world records were as follows.

World Record	Snatch	Wang Yanmei (CHN)	112.5 kg	Yangzhou, China	14 July 1997
World Record	Clean & Jerk	Li Yajuan (CHN)	155.0 kg	Melbourne, Australia	20 November 1993
World Record	Total	Li Yajuan (CHN)	260.0 kg	Melbourne, Australia	20 November 1993

== Results ==
Rank	Athlete	Body weight	Snatch (kg)				Clean & Jerk (kg)				Total
Rank	Athlete	Body weight	1	2	3	Rank	1	2	3	Rank	Total
1st place, gold medalist(s)	Ma Runmei (CHN)	97.75	102.5	~~107.5~~	107.5	3rd place, bronze medalist(s)	140.0	145.0	—	1st place, gold medalist(s)	252.5
2nd place, silver medalist(s)	Chen Shu-chih (TPE)	90.90	102.5	105.0	~~107.5~~	4	135.0	~~140.0~~	~~140.0~~	3rd place, bronze medalist(s)	240.0
3rd place, bronze medalist(s)	Aye Aye Aung (MYA)	107.05	100.0	105.0	110.0	1st place, gold medalist(s)	130.0	~~140.5~~	~~140.5~~	4	240.0
4	Balkisu Musa (NGR)	89.10	~~102.5~~	102.5	107.5	2nd place, silver medalist(s)	125.0	~~130.0~~	~~130.0~~	5	232.5
5	Vita Rudenok (UKR)	85.25	90.0	95.0	100.0	5	~~115.0~~	115.0	~~120.0~~	9	215.0
6	Lourdes Gorostegui (ESP)	90.20	90.0	92.5	95.0	6	112.5	117.5	~~122.5~~	6	212.5
7	Katarina Sederholm (NOR)	90.65	90.0	95.0	~~97.5~~	7	~~115.0~~	115.0	117.5	7	212.5
8	Agata Wróbel (POL)	100.50	~~95.0~~	~~95.0~~	95.0	8	110.0	115.0	117.5	8	212.5
9	Olivia Baker (NZL)	101.60	85.0	~~90.0~~	~~90.0~~	11	112.5	~~117.5~~	~~117.5~~	10	197.5
10	Filippia Kochliaridou (GRE)	83.30	85.0	~~90.0~~	~~90.0~~	10	107.5	~~112.5~~	~~112.5~~	11	192.5
11	Sheeva Peo (NRU)	86.10	72.5	~~77.5~~	77.5	12	100.0	~~105.0~~	~~105.0~~	12	177.5
—	Lisa Brien (USA)	124.05	87.5	~~92.5~~	~~92.5~~	9	~~112.5~~	~~112.5~~	~~112.5~~	—	—
—	Chen Hsiao-lien (TPE)	99.60	~~102.5~~	~~102.5~~	~~102.5~~	—	137.5	~~142.5~~	~~142.5~~	2nd place, silver medalist(s)	—
DQ	Nurcihan Gönül (TUR)	87.70	~~102.5~~	102.5	~~107.5~~	—	135.0	~~140.0~~	140.0	—	—
