= 2001 World Weightlifting Championships – Women's +75 kg =

The 2001 World Weightlifting Championships were held in Antalya, Turkey from November 4 to November 11. The women's competition in +75 kg division was staged on 10 November 2001.

== Medalists ==
Event	Gold		Silver		Bronze	
Snatch	Albina Khomich (RUS)	127.5 kg	Agata Wróbel (POL)	125.0 kg	Helen Idahosa (NGR)	117.5 kg
Clean & Jerk	Albina Khomich (RUS)	155.0 kg	Viktória Varga (HUN)	150.0 kg	Agata Wróbel (POL)	150.0 kg
Total	Albina Khomich (RUS)	282.5 kg	Agata Wróbel (POL)	275.0 kg	Chen Hsiao-lien (TPE)	262.5 kg

== Records ==
Prior to this competition, the existing world records were as follows.

World Record	Snatch	Ding Meiyuan (CHN)	135.0 kg	Sydney, Australia	22 September 2000
World Record	Clean & Jerk	Ding Meiyuan (CHN)	165.0 kg	Sydney, Australia	22 September 2000
World Record	Total	Ding Meiyuan (CHN)	300.0 kg	Sydney, Australia	22 September 2000

== Results ==
Rank	Athlete	Body weight	Snatch (kg)				Clean & Jerk (kg)				Total
Rank	Athlete	Body weight	1	2	3	Rank	1	2	3	Rank	Total
1st place, gold medalist(s)	Albina Khomich (RUS)	95.32	120.0	127.5	~~132.5~~	1st place, gold medalist(s)	145.0	150.0	155.0	1st place, gold medalist(s)	282.5
2nd place, silver medalist(s)	Agata Wróbel (POL)	116.74	115.0	120.0	125.0	2nd place, silver medalist(s)	~~145.0~~	150.0	~~155.0~~	3rd place, bronze medalist(s)	275.0
3rd place, bronze medalist(s)	Chen Hsiao-lien (TPE)	100.50	110.0	115.0	117.5	4	140.0	145.0	~~150.0~~	5	262.5
4	Viktória Varga (HUN)	92.54	~~110.0~~	110.0	~~115.0~~	8	140.0	145.0	150.0	2nd place, silver medalist(s)	260.0
5	Helen Idahosa (NGR)	98.96	110.0	115.0	117.5	3rd place, bronze medalist(s)	~~140.0~~	140.0	~~145.0~~	7	257.5
6	Derya Açikgöz (TUR)	86.24	102.5	~~107.5~~	107.5	9	140.0	~~145.0~~	145.0	4	252.5
7	Carmenza Delgado (COL)	92.32	110.0	~~115.0~~	~~115.0~~	7	~~140.0~~	~~140.0~~	140.0	6	250.0
8	Vasiliki Kasapi (GRE)	110.30	102.5	107.5	112.5	6	130.0	~~137.5~~	~~137.5~~	9	242.5
9	Aikaterini Roditi (GRE)	90.48	102.5	107.5	112.5	5	~~127.5~~	~~127.5~~	127.5	10	240.0
10	Moon Kyung-ae (KOR)	95.30	95.0	100.0	105.0	10	120.0	125.0	130.0	8	235.0
11	Susanne Dandenault (CAN)	113.14	90.0	95.0	97.5	11	~~122.5~~	~~122.5~~	125.0	11	222.5
—	Olivia Baker (NZL)	94.98	~~100.0~~	~~100.0~~	~~100.0~~	—	~~125.0~~	~~125.0~~	—	—	—
