= Weightlifting at the 1998 Asian Games – Women's 48 kg =

Women's 48 kg at the 1998 Asian Games
- Venue: Thunder Dome
- Date: 7 December 1998
- Competitors: 7 from 7 nations

Medalists
gold medal	Liu Xiuhua	China
silver medal	Kay Thi Win	Myanmar
bronze medal	Sri Indriyani	Indonesia

The women's 48 kilograms event at the 1998 Asian Games took place on 7 December 1998 at Thunder Dome, Maung Thong Thani Sports Complex.

A total of seven weightlifters from seven national Olympic committees participated in this event. The weightlifter, Liu Xiuhua from China won the gold, with a combined lift of 187.5 kg. she also broke the snatch world record with 83.5 kilograms, she also tried to break the clean and jerk world record but was unsuccessful.

Total score was the sum of the lifter's best result in each of the snatch and the clean and jerk, with three lifts allowed for each lift. In case of a tie, the lighter lifter won; if still tied, the lifter who took the fewest attempts to achieve the total score won. Lifters without a valid snatch score were allowed to perform the clean and jerk.

== Results ==
Rank	Athlete	Body weight	Snatch (kg)				Clean & Jerk (kg)				Total
Rank	Athlete	Body weight	1	2	3	Result	1	2	3	Result	Total
1st place, gold medalist(s)	Liu Xiuhua (CHN)	47.45	80.0	~~83.5~~	83.5	82.5	105.0	~~113.0~~	~~115.0~~	105.0	187.5
2nd place, silver medalist(s)	Kay Thi Win (MYA)	48.00	77.5	~~80.0~~	~~80.0~~	77.5	102.5	~~105.0~~	105.0	105.0	182.5
3rd place, bronze medalist(s)	Sri Indriyani (INA)	46.85	77.5	80.0	~~82.5~~	80.0	~~100.0~~	100.0	~~102.5~~	100.0	180.0
4	Udomporn Polsak (THA)	47.65	~~75.0~~	~~77.5~~	77.5	77.5	100.0	~~102.5~~	~~102.5~~	100.0	177.5
5	Chu Nan-mei (TPE)	47.70	~~77.5~~	77.5	~~80.0~~	77.5	~~95.0~~	~~95.0~~	95.0	95.0	172.5
6	Kaori Niyanagi (JPN)	47.65	72.5	75.0	~~77.5~~	75.0	95.0	~~100.0~~	~~100.0~~	95.0	170.0
7	Kunjarani Devi (IND)	47.60	70.0	~~75.0~~	~~75.0~~	70.0	95.0	~~102.5~~	~~102.5~~	95.0	165.0

== New records ==
The following records were established during the competition.

Snatch	83.5	Liu Xiuhua (CHN)	WR
