= Weightlifting at the 2004 Summer Olympics – Women's +75 kg =

Weightlifting at the Olympics

Women's +75 kg at the Games of the XXVIII Olympiad
- Venue: Nikaia Olympic Weightlifting Hall
- Date: 21 August 2004
- Competitors: 12 from 11 nations

Medalists
1st place, gold medalist(s)		Tang Gonghong	China
2nd place, silver medalist(s)		Jang Mi-ran	South Korea
3rd place, bronze medalist(s)		Agata Wróbel	Poland

The women's 75 kilograms weightlifting event at the 2004 Summer Olympics in Athens, Greece took place at the Nikaia Olympic Weightlifting Hall on 21 August.

Total score was the sum of the lifter's best result in each of the snatch and the clean and jerk, with three lifts allowed for each lift. In case of a tie, the lighter lifter won; if still tied, the lifter who took the fewest attempts to achieve the total score won. Lifters without a valid snatch score did not perform the clean and jerk.

== Schedule ==
All times are Eastern European Summer Time (UTC+03:00)

Date	Time	Event
21 August 2004	16:30	Group A

== Records ==
{{{caption}}}
World Record	Snatch	Ding Meiyuan (CHN)	137.5 kg	Vancouver, Canada	21 November 2003
World Record	Clean & Jerk	Tang Gonghong (CHN)	175.0 kg	Almaty, Kazakhstan	11 April 2004
World Record	Total	Tang Gonghong (CHN)	302.5 kg	Almaty, Kazakhstan	11 April 2004
Olympic Record	Snatch	Ding Meiyuan (CHN)	135.0 kg	Sydney, Australia	22 September 2000
Olympic Record	Clean & Jerk	Ding Meiyuan (CHN)	165.0 kg	Sydney, Australia	22 September 2000
Olympic Record	Total	Ding Meiyuan (CHN)	300.0 kg	Sydney, Australia	22 September 2000

== Results ==
Rank	Athlete	Group	Body weight	Snatch (kg)				Clean & Jerk (kg)				Total
Rank	Athlete	Group	Body weight	1	2	3	Result	1	2	3	Result	Total
1st place, gold medalist(s)	Tang Gonghong (CHN)	A	119.52	~~122.5~~	122.5	~~127.5~~	122.5	~~172.5~~	172.5	182.5	182.5	305.0
2nd place, silver medalist(s)	Jang Mi-ran (KOR)	A	113.34	125.0	130.0	~~132.5~~	130.0	165.0	~~170.0~~	172.5	172.5	302.5
3rd place, bronze medalist(s)	Agata Wróbel (POL)	A	124.68	125.0	130.0	~~132.5~~	130.0	160.0	~~167.5~~	~~170.0~~	160.0	290.0
4	Viktória Varga (HUN)	A	93.69	125.0	127.5	~~130.0~~	127.5	152.5	155.0	~~162.5~~	155.0	282.5
5	Viktoriya Shaimardanova (UKR)	A	88.14	122.5	127.5	130.0	130.0	~~150.0~~	~~150.0~~	150.0	150.0	280.0
6	Cheryl Haworth (USA)	A	131.95	125.0	—	—	125.0	150.0	152.5	155.0	155.0	280.0
7	Olha Korobka (UKR)	A	156.19	~~125.0~~	125.0	~~130.0~~	125.0	155.0	~~160.0~~	~~167.5~~	155.0	280.0
8	Vasiliki Kasapi (GRE)	A	120.57	120.0	~~125.0~~	125.0	125.0	145.0	150.0	152.5	152.5	277.5
9	Carmenza Delgado (COL)	A	94.37	~~120.0~~	~~120.0~~	120.0	120.0	145.0	~~150.0~~	150.0	150.0	270.0
10	Manuela Rejas (PER)	A	108.52	90.0	92.5	95.0	95.0	122.5	~~125.0~~	125.0	125.0	220.0
11	Reanna Solomon (NRU)	A	136.85	90.0	~~95.0~~	95.0	95.0	~~122.5~~	122.5	125.0	125.0	220.0
12	Ivy Shaw (FIJ)	A	83.70	80.0	85.0	~~90.0~~	85.0	~~100.0~~	100.0	~~110.0~~	100.0	185.0

== New records ==
Clean & Jerk	172.5 kg	Tang Gonghong (CHN)	OR
Clean & Jerk	182.5 kg	Tang Gonghong (CHN)	WR
Total	302.5 kg	Jang Mi-ran (KOR)	OR
Total	305.0 kg	Tang Gonghong (CHN)	WR
