= Weightlifting at the 2007 All-Africa Games – Women's +75 kg =

Weightlifting – Women's +75 kg at the 2007 All-Africa Games
- Dates: 19 July 2007
- Competitors: 6 from 4 nations
- Winning total weight: 268

Medalists
| gold medal | Nahla Ramadan | Egypt |
| silver medal | Mariam Usman | Nigeria |
| bronze medal | Afaf Abdel Tahab | Egypt |

The Women's +75 kg weightlifting event at the 2007 All-Africa Games were held in Algiers, Algeria on 19 July 2007.

== Records ==
Prior to this competition, the existing world, Commonwealth and Games records were as follows:

| World record | Snatch | Mu Shuangshuang (CHN) | 139 kg | Doha, Qatar | 6 December 2006 |
| World record | Clean & Jerk | Tang Gonghong (CHN) | 182 kg | Athens, Greece | 21 August 2004 |
| World record | Total | Jang Mi-ran (KOR) | 318 kg | Wonju, South Korea | 22 May 2006 |
| African record | Snatch | Helen Idahosa (NGR) | 117 kg | Antalya, Turkey | 10 November 2001 |
| African record | Clean & Jerk | Imen Hasnaoui (TUN) | 141 kg | Kampala, Uganda | 25 July 2005 |
| African record | Total | Helen Idahosa (NGR) | 257 kg | Antalya, Turkey | 10 November 2001 |
| Games record | Snatch | | | | |
| Games record | Clean & Jerk | | | | |
| Games record | Total | | | | |

The following records were established during the competition:

| Clean & Jerk | 151 kg | Nahla Ramadan (EGY) | AR |
| Total | 268 kg | Nahla Ramadan (EGY) | AR |

== Schedule ==
All times are West Africa Time (UTC+1)

| Date | Time | Round |
|---|---|---|
| Thursday 19 July 2007 | 11:00 | Group A |

== Results ==
| Rank | Athlete | Body weight (kg) | Snatch (kg) | | | | | Clean & Jerk (kg) | | | | | Total |
| Rank | Athlete | Body weight (kg) | 1 | 2 | 3 | Result | Rank | 1 | 2 | 3 | Result | Rank | Total |
|---|---|---|---|---|---|---|---|---|---|---|---|---|---|
| 1st place, gold medalist(s) | Nahla Ramadan (EGY) | 85.64 | 112 | 117 | ~~121~~ | 117 | 1st place, gold medalist(s) | 141 | 151 | ~~155~~ | 151 | 1st place, gold medalist(s) | 268 |
| 2nd place, silver medalist(s) | Mariam Usman (NGR) | 109.24 | ~~110~~ | 110 | ~~118~~ | 110 | 2nd place, silver medalist(s) | 133 | 138 | ~~142~~ | 138 | 2nd place, silver medalist(s) | 248 |
| 3rd place, bronze medalist(s) | Afaf Abdel Tahab (EGY) | 92.07 | 92 | 100 | ~~102~~ | 100 | 3rd place, bronze medalist(s) | 125 | ~~133~~ | ~~133~~ | 125 | 3rd place, bronze medalist(s) | 225 |
| 4 | Gloria Amuh (GHA) | 99.29 | 95 | ~~100~~ | ~~100~~ | 95 | 4 | 120 | ~~125~~ | ~~125~~ | 120 | 4 | 215 |
| 5 | Gladys Mensah (GHA) | 89.68 | 82 | 87 | 90 | 90 | 5 | 110 | 115 | ~~120~~ | 115 | 5 | 205 |
| 6 | Kheira Hamani (ALG) | 92.00 | 82 | 87 | ~~92~~ | 87 | 6 | ~~105~~ | 105 | 110 | 110 | 6 | 197 |
