= Weightlifting at the 1997 National Games of China =

Weightlifting was part of the 1997 National Games of China held in Shanghai. Men competed in ten and women in nine weight classes.

The competition program at the National Games mirrors that of the Olympic Games as only medals for the total achieved are awarded, but not for individual lifts in either the snatch or clean and jerk. Likewise an athlete failing to register a snatch result cannot advance to the clean and jerk.

== Medal summary ==
=== Men ===
Event	Gold		Silver		Bronze	
54 kg	Lan Shizhang; Guangxi	285 kg	Yang Bin; Guangxi	277.5 kg	Xie Changbao; Beijing	272.5 kg
59 kg	Le Maosheng; Hunan	307.5 kg	Shi Zhiyong; Fujian	307.5 kg	Yu Tingxiao; Sichuan	295 kg
64 kg	Yang Cunkang; Sichuan	317.5 kg	Xiao Jiangang; Guangxi	317.5 kg	Wang Guohua; Fujian	317.5 kg
70 kg	Zhan Xugang; Zhejiang	360 kg	Wan Jianhui; Fujian	340 kg	Zhang Guozheng; Yunnan	332.5 kg
76 kg	Lin Shoufeng; Shandong	357.5 kg	Xu Qiang; Shandong	355 kg	Chen Yong; Fujian	347.5 kg
83 kg	Li Yunnan; Jiangsu	377.5 kg	Zhang Yong; Sichuan	370 kg	Wang Hailong; Heilongjiang	345 kg
91 kg	Yuan Aijun; Jiangsu	375 kg	Qin Guang; Jiangxi	372.5 kg	Wang Hai; Shandong	370 kg
99 kg	Fan Hongsheng; Jilin	382.5 kg	Tao Yueqiang; Anhui	380 kg	Ma Yanfei; Hebei	380 kg
108 kg	Cui Wenhua; Jiangsu	410 kg	Wu Zhongyou; Liaoning	387.5 kg	Li Xiaoshi; Jilin	385 kg
108+ kg	Wei Tiehan; Hebei	405 kg	Ma Wenhua; Jilin	397.5 kg	Yang Wei; Fujian	395 kg

=== Women ===
Event	Gold		Silver		Bronze	
46 kg	Xing Fen; Guangdong	202.5 kg	Jiang Yinsu; Hubei	197.5 kg	Yun Yanhong; Hebei	195 kg
50 kg	Li Zhuo; Liaoning	217.5 kg	Li Yunli; Hunan	217.5 kg	Liu Xiuhua; Guangdong	212.5 kg
54 kg	Yang Xia; Hunan	232.5 kg	Long Yuling; Hunan	230 kg	Zhang Xixiang; Guangdong	225 kg
59 kg	Chen Yanqing; Jiangsu	250 kg	Xu Xiongying; Hubei	242.5 kg	Zou Feie; Hunan	242.5 kg
64 kg	Lei Li; PLA	260 kg	Diao Weiwei "Silver eagle"	257.5 kg	Hou Kangfeng; Hunan	255 kg
70 kg	Sun Tianni; Shandong	272.5 kg	Shang Shichun; Sichuan	265 kg	Qu Lihua; Liaoning	260 kg
76 kg	Yue Pingtian; Guangdong	280 kg	Xing Shuwen; Liaoning	267.5 kg	Sun Yakun; Shanxi	267.5 kg
83 kg	Wei Xiangying; Liaoning	292.5 kg	Sun Ruiping; Sichuan	282.5 kg	Feng Yuemei; Shanxi	280 kg
83+ kg	Ding Meiyuan; Liaoning	307.5 kg	Dan Yulong; Shandong	297.5 kg	Tang Gonghong; Hainan	290 kg

== Medal table ==
Rank	Delegation	Gold	Silver	Bronze	Total
1	Jiangsu	4	0	0	4
2	Liaoning	3	2	1	6
3	Hunan	2	2	2	6
4	Shandong	2	2	1	5
5	Guangdong	2	0	2	4
6	Sichuan	1	3	1	5
7	Guangxi	1	2	0	3
8	Jilin	1	1	1	3
9	Hebei	1	0	2	3
10	People's Liberation Army	1	0	0	1
10	Zhejiang	1	0	0	1
12	Fujian	0	2	3	5
13	Hubei	0	2	0	2
14	"Silver eagle"	0	1	0	1
14	Anhui	0	1	0	1
14	Jiangxi	0	1	0	1
17	Shanxi	0	0	2	2
18	Beijing	0	0	1	1
18	Hainan	0	0	1	1
18	Heilongjiang	0	0	1	1
18	Yunnan	0	0	1	1
Totals (21 entries)		19	19	19	57
