= Weightlifting at the 2005 National Games of China =

Weightlifting was part of the 2005 National Games of China held in Jiangsu. Men competed in eight and women in seven weight classes.

The competition program at the National Games mirrors that of the Olympic Games as only medals for the total achieved are awarded, but not for individual lifts in either the snatch or clean and jerk. Likewise an athlete failing to register a snatch result cannot advance to the clean and jerk.

== Medal summary ==
=== Men ===
Event	Gold		Silver		Bronze	
56 kg	Yu Tingxiao; Sichuan	282.5 kg	Lu Jinbi; Yunnan	280 kg	Wu Meijin; Fujian	277.5 kg
62 kg	Qiu Le; Guangxi	322.5 kg	Zhang Ping; Sichuan	320 kg	Qin Yifu; Guangxi	315 kg
69 kg	Li Zhihong; Guangdong	345 kg	Shi Zhiyong; Fujian	342.5 kg	Chen Chufu; Hunan	342.5 kg
77 kg	Li Hongli; Guangdong	367.5 kg	Han Huaping; Jiangxi	352.5 kg	Su Dajin; PLA	350 kg
85 kg	Yuan Aijun; Jiangsu	380 kg	Lu Yong; Guangxi	377.5 kg	Huang Zhong; Sichuan	370 kg
94 kg	Ruan Junfa; Jiangxi	387.5 kg	Wang Hailong; Heilongjiang	387.5 kg	Sun Weiyi; Jiangsu	382.5 kg
105 kg	Cui Wenhua; Jiangsu	392.5 kg	Zhang Chongxi; Yunnan	387.5 kg	Li Yijun; Shanghai	382.5 kg
105+ kg	Dong Feng; Liaoning	437.5 kg	Han Wenliang; Jilin	430 kg	Sun Haibo; Jilin	415 kg

=== Women ===
Event	Gold		Silver		Bronze	
48 kg	Yang Lian; Hunan	215 kg	Gao Wei; Liaoning	212.5 kg	Li Zhuo; Liaoning	205 kg
53 kg	Li Ping; Hunan	230 kg	Deng Jianying; Hunan	222.5 kg	Lin Xiaodan; PLA	217.5 kg
58 kg	Chen Yanqing; Jiangsu	255 kg	Gu Wei; PLA	247.5 kg	Qiu Hongmei; Jiangxi	247.5 kg
63 kg	Ouyang Xiaofang; Liaoning	260 kg	Yan Xiaoli; Shandong	255 kg	Wang Zhu; Jiangsu	252.5 kg
69 kg	Li Liying; Hunan	275 kg	Liu Haixia; Tianjin	265 kg	Zhao Yan; Shanghai	262.5 kg
75 kg	Liu Chunhong; Shandong	280 kg	Du Yeying; PLA	280 kg	Li Xia; Communication	270 kg
75+ kg	Ding Meiyuan; Liaoning	305 kg	Zhang Zheng; Shanghai	295 kg	Huang Huan; Sichuan	290 kg

== Medal table ==
Rank	Delegation	Gold	Silver	Bronze	Total
1	Hunan	3	1	1	5
1	Liaoning	3	1	1	5
3	Jiangsu	3	0	2	5
4	Guangdong	2	0	0	2
5	Sichuan	1	1	2	4
6	Guangxi	1	1	1	3
6	Jiangxi	1	1	1	3
8	Shandong	1	1	0	2
9	People's Liberation Army	0	2	2	4
10	Yunnan	0	2	0	2
11	Shanghai	0	1	2	3
12	Fujian	0	1	1	2
12	Jilin	0	1	1	2
14	Heilongjiang	0	1	0	1
14	Tianjin	0	1	0	1
16	Communication	0	0	1	1
Totals (16 entries)		15	15	15	45
