= Weightlifting at the 2002 Asian Games – Women's 48 kg =

Women's 48 kg at the 2002 Asian Games
- Venue: Pukyong National University Gymnasium
- Date: 30 September 2002
- Competitors: 12 from 9 nations

Medalists
gold medal	Li Zhuo	China
silver medal	Kay Thi Win	Myanmar
bronze medal	Raema Lisa Rumbewas	Indonesia

The women's 48 kilograms event at the 2002 Asian Games took place on September 30, 2002 at Pukyong National University Gymnasium, South Korea.

== Schedule ==
All times are Korea Standard Time (UTC+09:00)

Date	Time	Event
Monday, 30 September 2002	15:00	Group A

== Records ==
Prior to this competition, the existing world, Asian and Games records were as follows.

World Record	Snatch	Wang Mingjuan (CHN)	90.0 kg	Havířov, Czech Republic	30 May 2002
World Record	Clean & Jerk	Li Zhuo (CHN)	115.0 kg	İzmir, Turkey	28 June 2002
World Record	Total	Wang Mingjuan (CHN)	200.0 kg	Havířov, Czech Republic	30 May 2002
Asian Record	Snatch	Wang Mingjuan (CHN)	90.0 kg	Havířov, Czech Republic	30 May 2002
Asian Record	Clean & Jerk	Li Zhuo (CHN)	115.0 kg	İzmir, Turkey	28 June 2002
Asian Record	Total	Wang Mingjuan (CHN)	200.0 kg	Havířov, Czech Republic	30 May 2002
Games Record	Snatch	Liu Xiuhua (CHN)	83.5 kg	Bangkok, Thailand	7 December 1998
Games Record	Clean & Jerk	Liu Xiuhua (CHN)	105.0 kg	Bangkok, Thailand	7 December 1998
Games Record	Total	Liu Xiuhua (CHN)	187.5 kg	Bangkok, Thailand	7 December 1998

== Results ==
Legend

- NM — No mark

Rank	Athlete	Body weight	Snatch (kg)				Clean & Jerk (kg)				Total
Rank	Athlete	Body weight	1	2	3	Result	1	2	3	Result	Total
1st place, gold medalist(s)	Li Zhuo (CHN)	47.70	85.0	87.5	90.0	90.0	~~110.0~~	110.0	~~115.5~~	110.0	200.0
2nd place, silver medalist(s)	Kay Thi Win (MYA)	47.95	~~85.0~~	85.0	90.0	90.0	107.5	110.0	~~115.0~~	110.0	200.0
3rd place, bronze medalist(s)	Raema Lisa Rumbewas (INA)	47.90	80.0	85.0	~~90.0~~	85.0	105.0	110.0	~~115.0~~	110.0	195.0
4	Chen Han-tung (TPE)	47.65	77.5	80.0	~~82.5~~	80.0	102.5	~~105.0~~	105.0	105.0	185.0
5	Choe Un-sim (PRK)	47.90	80.0	~~85.0~~	85.0	85.0	97.5	~~100.0~~	~~100.0~~	97.5	182.5
6	Rosmainar (INA)	47.60	~~77.5~~	77.5	~~82.5~~	77.5	~~100.0~~	~~100.0~~	100.0	100.0	177.5
7	Kunjarani Devi (IND)	47.75	~~75.0~~	75.0	~~80.0~~	75.0	97.5	~~102.5~~	~~102.5~~	97.5	172.5
8	Masumi Imaoka (JPN)	47.50	~~72.5~~	72.5	~~75.0~~	72.5	92.5	~~97.5~~	~~97.5~~	92.5	165.0
9	Diwa Alegada (PHI)	46.25	60.0	65.0	~~67.5~~	65.0	80.0	85.0	~~90.0~~	85.0	150.0
—	Kyi Kyi Than (MYA)	47.85	82.5	~~85.0~~	~~85.0~~	82.5	~~105.0~~	~~105.0~~	~~105.0~~	—	NM
—	Aree Wiratthaworn (THA)	47.90	~~77.5~~	~~77.5~~	77.5	77.5	~~105.0~~	~~105.0~~	~~105.0~~	—	NM
—	Sanamacha Chanu (IND)	48.00	77.5	~~80.0~~	~~80.0~~	77.5	—	—	—	—	NM

== New records ==
The following records were established during the competition.

Snatch	85.0	Li Zhuo (CHN)	GR
Snatch	87.5	Li Zhuo (CHN)	GR
Snatch	90.0	Kay Thi Win (MYA)	GR
Clean & Jerk	107.5	Kay Thi Win (MYA)	GR
Clean & Jerk	110.0	Raema Lisa Rumbewas (INA)	GR
Total	190.0	Raema Lisa Rumbewas (INA)	GR
Total	197.5	Kay Thi Win (MYA)	GR
Total	200.0	Kay Thi Win (MYA)	GR
