= Weightlifting at the 2002 Asian Games – Women's 53 kg =

Women's 53 kg at the 2002 Asian Games
- Venue: Pukyong National University Gymnasium
- Date: 1 October 2002
- Competitors: 9 from 7 nations

Medalists
| gold medal | Ri Song-hui | North Korea |
| silver medal | Udomporn Polsak | Thailand |
| bronze medal | Meng Xianjuan | China |

The women's 53 kilograms event at the 2002 Asian Games took place on October 1, 2002, at Pukyong National University Gymnasium.

== Schedule ==
All times are Korea Standard Time (UTC+09:00)

| Date | Time | Event |
|---|---|---|
| Tuesday, 1 October 2002 | 15:00 | Group A |

== Records ==
Prior to this competition, the existing world, Asian and Games records were as follows.

| World Record | Snatch | Yang Xia (CHN) | 100.0 kg | Sydney, Australia | 18 September 2000 |
| World Record | Clean & Jerk | Yang Xia (CHN) | 125.0 kg | Sydney, Australia | 18 September 2000 |
| World Record | Total | Yang Xia (CHN) | 225.0 kg | Sydney, Australia | 18 September 2000 |
| Asian Record | Snatch | Yang Xia (CHN) | 100.0 kg | Sydney, Australia | 18 September 2000 |
| Asian Record | Clean & Jerk | Yang Xia (CHN) | 125.0 kg | Sydney, Australia | 18 September 2000 |
| Asian Record | Total | Yang Xia (CHN) | 225.0 kg | Sydney, Australia | 18 September 2000 |
| Games Record | Snatch | Yang Xia (CHN) | 92.5 kg | Bangkok, Thailand | 8 December 1998 |
| Games Record | Clean & Jerk | Yang Xia (CHN) | 120.0 kg | Bangkok, Thailand | 8 December 1998 |
| Games Record | Total | Yang Xia (CHN) | 212.5 kg | Bangkok, Thailand | 8 December 1998 |

== Results ==
Legend

- NM — No mark

| Rank | Athlete | Body weight | Snatch (kg) | | | | Clean & Jerk (kg) | | | | Total |
| Rank | Athlete | Body weight | 1 | 2 | 3 | Result | 1 | 2 | 3 | Result | Total |
|---|---|---|---|---|---|---|---|---|---|---|---|
| 1st place, gold medalist(s) | Ri Song-hui (PRK) | 52.85 | 97.5 | ~~102.5~~ | 102.5 | 102.5 | 122.5 | ~~127.5~~ | ~~127.5~~ | 122.5 | 225.0 |
| 2nd place, silver medalist(s) | Udomporn Polsak (THA) | 52.35 | 92.5 | ~~97.5~~ | ~~97.5~~ | 92.5 | 117.5 | 120.0 | ~~122.5~~ | 120.0 | 212.5 |
| 3rd place, bronze medalist(s) | Meng Xianjuan (CHN) | 52.45 | ~~92.5~~ | 92.5 | ~~95.0~~ | 92.5 | ~~120.0~~ | 120.0 | ~~122.5~~ | 120.0 | 212.5 |
| 4 | Junpim Kuntatean (THA) | 52.50 | 77.5 | ~~82.5~~ | 82.5 | 82.5 | 97.5 | 102.5 | 105.0 | 105.0 | 187.5 |
| 5 | Kumie Matsumiya (JPN) | 51.45 | 70.0 | 75.0 | ~~77.5~~ | 75.0 | 97.5 | 102.5 | 105.0 | 105.0 | 180.0 |
| 6 | Bayansuuriin Baasandemberel (MGL) | 52.05 | 55.0 | 60.0 | ~~65.0~~ | 60.0 | 65.0 | ~~70.0~~ | 75.0 | 75.0 | 135.0 |
| — | Mari Nakaga (JPN) | 52.65 | ~~75.0~~ | 75.0 | 77.5 | 77.5 | ~~97.5~~ | ~~97.5~~ | ~~97.5~~ | — | NM |
| — | Swe Swe Win (MYA) | 52.70 | 90.0 | 92.5 | ~~95.0~~ | 92.5 | ~~117.5~~ | ~~117.5~~ | ~~117.5~~ | — | NM |
| — | Li Feng-ying (TPE) | 52.45 | ~~90.0~~ | ~~90.0~~ | 90.0 | 90.0 | — | — | — | — | NM |

== New records ==
The following records were established during the competition.

| Snatch | 97.5 | Ri Song-hui (PRK) | GR |
| Snatch | 102.5 | Ri Song-hui (PRK) | WR |
| Clean & Jerk | 122.5 | Ri Song-hui (PRK) | GR |
| Total | 225.0 | Ri Song-hui (PRK) | GR |
