= Weightlifting at the 2001 National Games of China =

Weightlifting was part of the 2001 National Games of China held in Guangdong. Men competed in eight and women in seven weight classes.

The competition program at the National Games mirrors that of the Olympic Games as only medals for the total achieved are awarded, but not for individual lifts in either the snatch or clean and jerk. Likewise an athlete failing to register a snatch result cannot advance to the clean and jerk.

== Medal summary ==
=== Men ===
| Event | Gold | | Silver | | Bronze | |
|---|---|---|---|---|---|---|
| 56 kg | Zhang Xiangxiang; Fujian | 295 kg | Lan Shizhang; Guangxi | 287.5 kg | Wang Xiaowen; Hunan | 285 kg |
| 62 kg | Su Feixiang; Guangdong | 327.5 kg | Le Maosheng; Hunan | 325 kg | Shi Zhiyong; Fujian | 325 kg |
| 69 kg | Zhang Guozheng; Yunnan | 352.5 kg | Wan Jianhui; Fujian | 340 kg | Liu Huayong; Hunan | 337.5 kg |
| 77 kg | Li Hongli; Guangdong | 370 kg | Zhan Xugang; Zhejiang | 365 kg | Xu Qiang; Shandong | 340 kg |
| 85 kg | Yuan Aijun; Jiangsu | 385 kg | Jiang Hairong; Guangdong | 365 kg | Ruan Junfa; Jiangxi | 357.5 kg |
| 94 kg | Qin Guang; Jiangxi | 387.5 kg | Tao Yueqiang; Anhui | 367.5 kg | Geng Deli; Jilin | 365 kg |
| 105 kg | Cui Wenhua; Jiangsu | 395 kg | Zhang Chongxi; Yunnan | 380 kg | Ma Yanfei; Hebei | 375 kg |
| 105+ kg | Han Wenliang; Jilin | 425 kg | Dong Feng; Liaoning | 420 kg | Jiang Kai; Tianjin | 412.5 kg |

=== Women ===
| Event | Gold | | Silver | | Bronze | |
|---|---|---|---|---|---|---|
| 48 kg | Wang Mingjuan; Hunan | 210 kg | Li Zhuo; Liaoning | 202.5 kg | Liu Xiuhua; Guangdong | 202.5 kg |
| 53 kg | Yang Xia; Hunan | 222.5 kg | Han Lijuan; PLA | 220 kg | Wang Jingjing; Unaffiliated | 217.5 kg |
| 58 kg | Song Zhijuan; PLA | 250 kg | Li Xuejiu; Shanghai | 242.5 kg | Chen Yanqing; Jiangsu | 242.5 kg |
| 63 kg | Yan Xiaoli; Shandong | 257.5 kg | Xiong Meiying; Jiangxi | 257.5 kg | Diao Weiwei; Finance | 252.5 kg |
| 69 kg | Liu Chunhong; Shandong | 277.5 kg | Liu Haixia; Jilin | 270 kg | Liu Dongping; Jiangsu | 262.5 kg |
| 75 kg | Sun Ruiping; Guangdong | 265 kg | Zhang Ning; Anhui | 262.5 kg | Lin Hua; Shanghai | 262.5 kg |
| 75+ kg | Tang Gonghong; Shandong | 312.5 kg | Ding Meiyuan; Liaoning | 300 kg | Liu Linqing; Anhui | 292.5 kg |

== Medal table ==
| Rank | Delegation | Gold | Silver | Bronze | Total |
|---|---|---|---|---|---|
| 1 | Guangdong | 3 | 1 | 1 | 5 |
| 2 | Shandong | 3 | 0 | 1 | 4 |
| 3 | Hunan | 2 | 1 | 2 | 5 |
| 4 | Jiangsu | 2 | 0 | 2 | 4 |
| 5 | Fujian | 1 | 1 | 1 | 3 |
| 5 | Jiangxi | 1 | 1 | 1 | 3 |
| 5 | Jilin | 1 | 1 | 1 | 3 |
| 8 | People's Liberation Army | 1 | 1 | 0 | 2 |
| 8 | Yunnan | 1 | 1 | 0 | 2 |
| 10 | Liaoning | 0 | 3 | 0 | 3 |
| 11 | Anhui | 0 | 2 | 1 | 3 |
| 12 | Shanghai | 0 | 1 | 1 | 2 |
| 13 | Guangxi | 0 | 1 | 0 | 1 |
| 13 | Zhejiang | 0 | 1 | 0 | 1 |
| 15 | Finance | 0 | 0 | 1 | 1 |
| 15 | Hebei | 0 | 0 | 1 | 1 |
| 15 | Tianjin | 0 | 0 | 1 | 1 |
| 15 | Unaffiliated | 0 | 0 | 1 | 1 |
| Totals (18 entries) | | 15 | 15 | 15 | 45 |
