= Dong Feng (weightlifter) =

Chinese weightlifter (born 1980)

Personal information
- Nationality: Chinese
- Born: 12 May 1980 (age 46) Shenyang, Liaoning, China
- Height: 1.83 m (6 ft 0 in)
- Weight: 134.28 kg (296.0 lb)

Sport
- Country: China
- Sport: Weightlifting
- Event: +105 kg
Medal record
Men's weightlifting
Representing China
World Championships
Bronze medal – third place	2006 Santo Domingo	+105 kg
National Games of China
Gold medal – first place	2005 Jiangsu	+105 kg
Silver medal – second place	2001 Guangdong	+105 kg

Dong Feng (Chinese: 东峰, born 12 May 1980) is a Chinese weightlifter. He won the bronze medal at the 2006 World Weightlifting Championships in the +105 kg category.

== Major results ==
Year	Venue	Weight	Snatch (kg)				Clean & Jerk (kg)				Total	Rank
Year	Venue	Weight	1	2	3	Rank	1	2	3	Rank	Total	Rank
World Championships
2006	Santo Domingo, Dominican Republic	+105 kg	185	192	~~198~~	4	235	245	~~251~~	2nd place, silver medalist(s)	437	3rd place, bronze medalist(s)
