= Weightlifting at the 2002 Asian Games – Women's 58 kg =

Women's 58 kg at the 2002 Asian Games
- Venue: Pukyong National University Gymnasium
- Date: 2 October 2002
- Competitors: 9 from 9 nations

Medalists
gold medal	Zhou Yan	China
silver medal	Wandee Kameaim	Thailand
bronze medal	Tanti Pratiwi	Indonesia

The women's 58 kilograms event at the 2002 Asian Games took place on October 2, 2002, at Pukyong National University Gymnasium.

== Schedule ==
All times are Korea Standard Time (UTC+09:00)

Date	Time	Event
Wednesday, 2 October 2002	15:00	Group A

== Records ==
Prior to this competition, the existing world, Asian and Games records were as follows.

World Record	Snatch	Sun Caiyan (CHN)	105.5 kg	İzmir, Turkey	28 June 2002
World Record	Clean & Jerk	Sun Caiyan (CHN)	133.0 kg	İzmir, Turkey	28 June 2002
World Record	Total	Sun Caiyan (CHN)	237.5 kg	İzmir, Turkey	28 June 2002
Asian Record	Snatch	Sun Caiyan (CHN)	105.5 kg	İzmir, Turkey	28 June 2002
Asian Record	Clean & Jerk	Sun Caiyan (CHN)	133.0 kg	İzmir, Turkey	28 June 2002
Asian Record	Total	Sun Caiyan (CHN)	237.5 kg	İzmir, Turkey	28 June 2002
Games Record	Snatch	Chen Yanqing (CHN)	98.0 kg	Bangkok, Thailand	9 December 1998
Games Record	Clean & Jerk	Ri Song-hui (PRK)	125.0 kg	Bangkok, Thailand	9 December 1998
Games Record	Total	Chen Yanqing (CHN)	220.0 kg	Bangkok, Thailand	9 December 1998

== Results ==
Rank	Athlete	Body weight	Snatch (kg)				Clean & Jerk (kg)				Total
Rank	Athlete	Body weight	1	2	3	Result	1	2	3	Result	Total
1st place, gold medalist(s)	Zhou Yan (CHN)	57.10	95.0	~~100.0~~	~~100.0~~	95.0	122.5	125.0	~~133.5~~	125.0	220.0
2nd place, silver medalist(s)	Wandee Kameaim (THA)	57.55	~~90.0~~	~~90.0~~	90.0	90.0	120.0	122.5	125.0	125.0	215.0
3rd place, bronze medalist(s)	Tanti Pratiwi (INA)	57.20	87.5	~~92.5~~	92.5	92.5	115.0	~~120.0~~	120.0	120.0	212.5
4	Shwe Sin Win (MYA)	57.35	87.5	90.0	~~92.5~~	90.0	117.5	120.0	122.5	122.5	212.5
5	Im Jyoung-hwa (KOR)	55.65	82.5	~~87.5~~	87.5	87.5	105.0	112.5	~~120.0~~	112.5	200.0
6	Ling I-hua (TPE)	55.85	85.0	~~90.0~~	~~90.0~~	85.0	110.0	~~115.0~~	~~115.0~~	110.0	195.0
7	Namkhaidorjiin Bayarmaa (MGL)	57.70	85.0	~~90.0~~	~~90.0~~	85.0	~~110.0~~	~~110.0~~	110.0	110.0	195.0
8	Nguyễn Thị Thiết (VIE)	57.60	75.0	~~82.5~~	82.5	82.5	100.0	105.0	~~107.5~~	105.0	187.5
9	Cecilia Atilano (PHI)	56.00	80.0	85.0	87.5	87.5	97.5	~~102.5~~	~~102.5~~	97.5	185.0
