= Viktória Varga =

Hungarian weightlifter

Personal information
- Born: 17 April 1981 (age 45) Tatabánya, Hungary
- Height: 1.74 m (5 ft 9 in)
- Weight: 94.98 kg (209.4 lb)

Sport
- Country: Hungary
- Sport: Weightlifting
- Weight class: +75 kg
- Club: Kisbéri Vállalkozók Sportegyesület
- Team: National team
- Updated on 11 September 2016

Viktória Varga (born 17 April 1981 in Tatabánya) is a Hungarian female weightlifter, contesting in the +75 kg category and representing Hungary in numerous international competitions. A former world record holder in weightlifting, Varga also participated in the women's +75 kg division at the 2004 Summer Olympics.

== Major results ==
Year	Venue	Weight	Snatch (kg)				Clean & Jerk (kg)				Total	Rank
Year	Venue	Weight	1	2	3	Rank	1	2	3	Rank	Total	Rank
Summer Olympics
2004	Athens, Greece	+75 kg	125.0	127.5	~~130.0~~	4	152.5	155.0	~~162.5~~	4	282.5	4
World Championships
2006	Santo Domingo, Dominican Republic	+75 kg	88	~~92~~	92	25	~~112~~	~~112~~	112	26	204	26
2003	Vancouver, Canada	+75 kg	115.0	120.0	~~125.0~~	5	145.0	150.0	152.5	4	272.5	4
2002	Warsaw, Poland	+75 kg	~~120.0~~	120.0	~~125.0~~	4	150.0	~~157.5~~	~~157.5~~	4	270.0	5
2001	Antalya, Turkey	+75 kg	~~110.0~~	110.0	~~115.0~~	8	140.0	145.0	150.0	2nd place, silver medalist(s)	260.0	4
