= Weightlifting at the 2002 Asian Games – Women's 63 kg =

Women's 63 kg at the 2002 Asian Games
- Venue: Pukyong National University Gymnasium
- Date: 3 October 2002
- Competitors: 9 from 8 nations

Medalists
gold medal	Liu Xia	China
silver medal	Khin Moe Nwe	Myanmar
bronze medal	Kuo Ping-chun	Chinese Taipei

The women's 63 kilograms event at the 2002 Asian Games took place on October 3, 2002, at Pukyong National University Gymnasium.

== Schedule ==
All times are Korea Standard Time (UTC+09:00)

Date	Time	Event
Thursday, 3 October 2002	15:00	Group A

== Records ==
Prior to this competition, the existing world, Asian and Games records were as follows.

World Record	Snatch	Chen Xiaomin (CHN)	112.5 kg	Sydney, Australia	19 September 2000
World Record	Clean & Jerk	Nataliya Skakun (UKR)	135.0 kg	Antalya, Turkey	25 April 2002
World Record	Total	Chen Xiaomin (CHN)	242.5 kg	Sydney, Australia	19 September 2000
Asian Record	Snatch	Chen Xiaomin (CHN)	112.5 kg	Sydney, Australia	19 September 2000
Asian Record	Clean & Jerk	Xiong Meiying (CHN)	132.5 kg	Athens, Greece	23 November 1999
Asian Record	Total	Chen Xiaomin (CHN)	242.5 kg	Sydney, Australia	19 September 2000
Games Record	Snatch	Lei Li (CHN)	107.5 kg	Bangkok, Thailand	10 December 1998
Games Record	Clean & Jerk	Karnam Malleswari (IND)	125.0 kg	Bangkok, Thailand	10 December 1998
Games Record	Total	Lei Li (CHN)	232.5 kg	Bangkok, Thailand	10 December 1998

== Results ==
Legend

- NM — No mark

Rank	Athlete	Body weight	Snatch (kg)				Clean & Jerk (kg)				Total
Rank	Athlete	Body weight	1	2	3	Result	1	2	3	Result	Total
1st place, gold medalist(s)	Liu Xia (CHN)	62.30	97.5	102.5	105.0	105.0	127.5	135.5	~~137.5~~	135.0	240.0
2nd place, silver medalist(s)	Khin Moe Nwe (MYA)	61.45	~~97.5~~	97.5	100.0	100.0	115.0	~~120.0~~	120.0	120.0	220.0
3rd place, bronze medalist(s)	Kuo Ping-chun (TPE)	62.60	95.0	97.5	~~100.0~~	97.5	120.0	~~125.0~~	~~125.0~~	120.0	217.5
4	Olga Sablina (KAZ)	62.55	~~85.0~~	85.0	~~90.0~~	85.0	115.0	120.0	~~125.0~~	120.0	205.0
5	Pratima Kumari (IND)	62.95	85.0	~~90.0~~	90.0	90.0	112.5	~~115.0~~	115.0	115.0	205.0
6	Kim Mi-kyung (KOR)	62.65	85.0	90.0	~~92.5~~	90.0	112.5	~~120.0~~	~~120.0~~	112.5	202.5
7	Amporn Keawtanong (THA)	60.00	~~80.0~~	80.0	85.0	85.0	100.0	~~107.5~~	107.5	107.5	192.5
8	Dương Thị Ngọc (VIE)	59.20	75.0	~~85.0~~	~~85.0~~	75.0	95.0	105.0	—	105.0	180.0
—	Saipin Detsaeng (THA)	62.55	100.0	105.0	~~107.5~~	105.0	~~120.0~~	—	—	—	NM

== New records ==
The following records were established during the competition.

Clean & Jerk	127.5	Liu Xia (CHN)	GR
Clean & Jerk	135.5	Liu Xia (CHN)	WR
Total	240.0	Liu Xia (CHN)	GR
