= Li Liying =

Chinese entomologist

- Born: 1932
- Education: Beijing Agricultural University, Timiryazev Agricultural Academy
- Scientific career
- Fields: Entomology, Pest control
- Workplaces: Institute of Zoology, Guangdong Academy of Sciences

Li Liying (born 1932. Liying Li) is a research fellow at the Institute of Zoology of Guangdong Academy of Sciences. She has developed pest control techniques that are used to treat millions of hectares of crops and forests worldwide. She has published more than 110 papers and 9 books.

In 2000, Li Liying became an Honorary Member of the International Congress of Entomology having previously been a member (1984–2000) and vice president (1992–2000). In 2008, she was made an Honorary Member of IOBC Global. In 2020, Li Liying was awarded a Certificate of Distinction for Outstanding Achievements from the Council for International Congresses of Entomology (ICE Council) in Finland.

== Education ==
Li Liying was able to complete middle school at Shanghai Middle School on a scholarship. After graduating in 1949, she was admitted to study agronomy at Beijing Agricultural University (newly formed from the agricultural colleges of Tsinghua University, Beijing University, and North China University.) In 1951, the Chinese Government sent her to Timiryazev Agricultural Academy in Moscow, Russia. She did well despite initially poor Russian language skills, graduating in 1956.

During her last year of study she conducted fieldwork on control of pests in cotton: the two-spotted spider mite and cotton aphid. She and other workers were exposed to highly toxic organophosphates during aerial spraying of the fields. This experience led her to search for safer alternatives, focusing on the use of beneficial insects to control agricultural pests.

== Career ==
Li Liying returned to China in 1956, joining the Entomological Institute of the Academia Sinica (later the Zoological Institute). From 1956 to 1957 she studied soil insects of the Yangtze and Yellow River; From 1959 to 1960 the rice yellow stem borer in Hunan Province; and later the cotton bollworm.

In 1959, Li Liying married Pang Xiongfei (1929–2004), who was also a pest control scientist. In May 1961 she moved to Guangzhou, where she worked at the Center South Entomological Institute of the Academia Sinica (later Guangdong Entomological Institute; Guangdong Institute of Applied Biological Resources; Zoological Institute, Guangdong Academy of Sciences). Li Liying served as chief senior scientist, and later as director of Guangdong Entomological Institute from 1984–1992.

In 1970, Pang Xiongfei became the leader of the newly established Rice Pests Biological Control Working Group. Li Liying also joined the group, which partnered with Sun Yat-sen University and South China Agricultural College (later South China Agricultural University). They worked with farmers to use indigenous methods of biological pest control and established biological control stations throughout Guangdong Province and Hainan Island. The pests they studied included rice leafroller and rice yellow stem borer.

Li Liying visited and studied at the All Soviet Union Institute of Plant Biological Protection, Chișinău, Moldavian SSR, Soviet Union in 1989 (with Shoil Greenberg) and in 1991 (with Ms. Chen Qiaoxian). In 1993, she and her colleagues trained scientists from nine countries in the in vitro raising of Trichogramma for pest control. LI has fostered cooperation of entomologists in China and the rest of the world.

Li Liying has served as the Director of Guangdong Institute of Entomology (now GDAS Institute of Zoology), the President of the Entomological Society of China, and Executive Director of the International Plant Protection Congress and Asia-Pacific Congress of Entomology. She has been a member of the Executive Council for the International Plant Protection Congresses (1987–2001) and a member of the Council for the Asia-Pacific Conferences of Entomology (1989–1999).

== Research ==
Li studies integrated pest control for agriculture and forestry, particularly biological pest control. LI Liying has pioneered the breeding and use of natural enemies for pests, in particular the use of artificial eggs for the breeding of Anastatus and Trichogramma wasps such as T. dendrolimi and T. chilonis. She has helped to develop methods of pest control using Entomopathogenic nematodes and a predatory pentatomid, Eucanthecona furcellata.

== Awards ==
- 1995, International Plant Protection Award of Distinction (IPPAD) from the International Association for the Plant Protection Sciences.
- 2000, Honorary member of the International Congress of Entomology
- 2008, Honorary Member of IOBC Global
- 2020, Certificate of Distinction for Outstanding Achievements from the Council for International Congresses of Entomology (ICE Council) in Finland.
