= Monique Riesterer =

German weightlifter

Personal information
- Full name: Monique Riesterer-Ludwigs
- Born: 6 December 1971 (age 54) Rheinfelden, West Germany
- Height: 165 cm (5 ft 5 in)
- Weight: 92.70 kg (204.4 lb)

Sport
- Country: Germany
- Sport: Weightlifting
- Weight class: +75 kg
- Club: Turn- und Sportclub Berlin
- Team: National team
- Updated on 27 September 2016

Monique Riesterer-Ludwigs (born 6 December 1971 in Rheinfelden) was a German weightlifter, competing in the +75 kg category and representing Germany at international competitions.

She participated at the 2000 Summer Olympics in the +75 kg event. She competed at world championships, most recently at the 2002 World Weightlifting Championships.

== Major results ==
Year	Venue	Weight	Snatch (kg)				Clean & Jerk (kg)				Total	Rank
Year	Venue	Weight	1	2	3	Rank	1	2	3	Rank	Total	Rank
Summer Olympics
2000	Sydney, Australia	+75 kg				—N/a				—N/a		6
World Championships
2002	Warsaw, Poland	+75 kg	102.5	107.5	~~110~~	10	127.5	132.5	135	11	242.5	10
1998	Lahti, Finland	+75 kg	100	~~105~~	~~105~~	7	125	132.5	~~135~~	4	232.5	5
