= Manuela Rejas =

Peruvian weightlifter

Personal information
- Full name: Manuela Sara Rejas Phowell
- Born: 28 August 1978 (age 47)
- Height: 170 cm (5 ft 7 in)
- Weight: 111.03 kg (244.8 lb)

Sport
- Country: Peru
- Sport: Weightlifting
- Weight class: +75 kg
- Team: National team
- Updated on 13 September 2016

Manuela Sara Rejas Phowell (born 28 August 1978) was a Peruvian female weightlifter, competing in the +75 kg category and representing Peru at international competitions.

She participated at the 2004 Summer Olympics in the +75 kg event. She competed at world championships, most recently at the 2003 World Weightlifting Championships.

== Major results ==
| Year | Venue | Weight | Snatch (kg) | | | | Clean & Jerk (kg) | | | | Total | Rank |
| Year | Venue | Weight | 1 | 2 | 3 | Rank | 1 | 2 | 3 | Rank | Total | Rank |
Summer Olympics
| 2004 | Athens, Italy | +75 kg | | | | —N/a | | | | —N/a | | 10 |
World Championships
| 2003 | Vancouver, Canada | +75 kg | 80 | 85 | 87.5 | 26 | 115 | 122.5 | ~~125~~ | 20 | 210 | 24 |
