= Viktoriya Shaimardanova =

Ukrainian weightlifter

Personal information
- Full name: Viktoriya Yuriïvna Shaimardanova
- Born: 17 December 1973 (age 52)
- Height: 172 cm (5 ft 8 in)
- Weight: 88.45 kg (195.0 lb)

Sport
- Country: Ukraine
- Sport: Weightlifting
- Weight class: +75 kg
- Team: National team
- Updated on 13 September 2016

Viktoriya Yuriïvna Shaimardanova (Вікторія Юріївна Шаймарданова; born 17 December 1973) is a Ukrainian weightlifter, competing in the +75 kg category and representing Ukraine at international competitions.

She participated at the 2000 Summer Olympics in the +75 kg event. She competed at world championships, most recently at the 2003 World Weightlifting Championships.

== Major results ==
| Year | Venue | Weight | Snatch (kg) | | | | Clean & Jerk (kg) | | | | Total | Rank |
| Year | Venue | Weight | 1 | 2 | 3 | Rank | 1 | 2 | 3 | Rank | Total | Rank |
Summer Olympics
| 2004 | Athens, Greece | +75 kg | 122.5 | 127.5 | 130.0 | 3 | ~~150.0~~ | ~~150.0~~ | 150.0 | 8 | 280.0 | 5 |
World Championships
| 2003 | Vancouver, Canada | +75 kg | 112.5 | 117.5 | ~~120~~ | 7 | 135 | 142.5 | 145 | 8 | 262.5 | 8 |
| 2002 | Warsaw, Poland | +75 kg | 110 | 115 | 117.5 | 6 | 135 | 140 | ~~145~~ | 8 | 257.5 | 7 |
| 1999 | Piraeus, Greece | +75 kg | ~~105~~ | ~~105~~ | 105 | 9 | 125 | 130 | ~~135~~ | 9 | 235 | 9 |
| 1998 | Lahti, Finland | +75 kg | 95 | 100 | ~~102.5~~ | 6 | 115 | 120 | ~~122.5~~ | 9 | 220 | 8 |
