= Vita Rudenok =

Ukrainian weightlifter (born 1978)

Personal information
- Full name: Victoria Roudenok
- Born: 14 May 1978 (age 48)
- Height: 180 cm (5 ft 11 in)
- Weight: 101.46 kg (223.7 lb)

Sport
- Country: Ukraine
- Sport: Weightlifting
- Weight class: +75 kg
- Team: National team
Medal record
Women's Weightlifting
Representing Ukraine
European Championships
Gold medal – first place	2000 Sofia	+75 kg
Bronze medal – third place	1999 A Coruña	+75 kg
- Updated on 28 September 2016

Vita Rudenok also written as Victoria Roudenok (original name: Віта Руденок, born 14 May 1978) is a Ukrainian female weightlifter, competing in the +75 kg category and representing Ukraine at international competitions.

She participated at the 2000 Summer Olympics in the +75 kg event. She competed at world championships, most recently at the 1999 World Weightlifting Championships.

== Major results ==
Year	Venue	Weight	Snatch (kg)				Clean & Jerk (kg)				Total	Rank
Year	Venue	Weight	1	2	3	Rank	1	2	3	Rank	Total	Rank
Summer Olympics
2000	Sydney, Australia	+75 kg				—N/a				—N/a		DNF
World Championships
1999	Piraeus, Greece	+75 kg	105	110	~~112.5~~	6	130	~~135~~	~~137.5~~	10	240	7
1998	Lahti, Finland	+75 kg	95	100	102.5	5	122.5	~~127.5~~	127.5	5	230	6
1997	Chiang Mai, Thailand	+83 kg	90.0	95.0	100.0	5	~~115.0~~	115.0	~~120.0~~	9	215.0	5
