= Helen Idahosa =

Nigerian weightlifter

Personal information
- Full name: Helen Idahosa
- Born: 22 August 1972 (age 54)
- Height: 170 cm (5 ft 7 in)
- Weight: 98.96 kg (218.2 lb)

Sport
- Country: Nigeria
- Sport: Weightlifting
- Weight class: +75 kg
- Team: National team
- Updated on 27 September 2016

Helen Idahosa (born 22 August 1972) is a Nigerian female weightlifter, who competed in the +75 kg category, representing Nigeria at international competitions.

She participated at the 2000 Summer Olympics in the +75 kg event. She competed at world championships, most recently at the 2001 World Weightlifting Championships.

== Major results ==
Year	Venue	Weight	Snatch (kg)				Clean & Jerk (kg)				Total	Rank
Year	Venue	Weight	1	2	3	Rank	1	2	3	Rank	Total	Rank
Summer Olympics
2000	Sydney, Australia	+75 kg				—N/a				—N/a		5
World Championships
2001	Antalya, Turkey	+75 kg	110	115	117.5	3rd place, bronze medalist(s)	~~140~~	140	~~145~~	7	257.5	5
1999	Piraeus, Greece	+75 kg	95	100	105	8	120	~~130~~	130	8	235	8
