= Katarina Sederholm =

Finnish-Norwegian shot putter and weightlifter

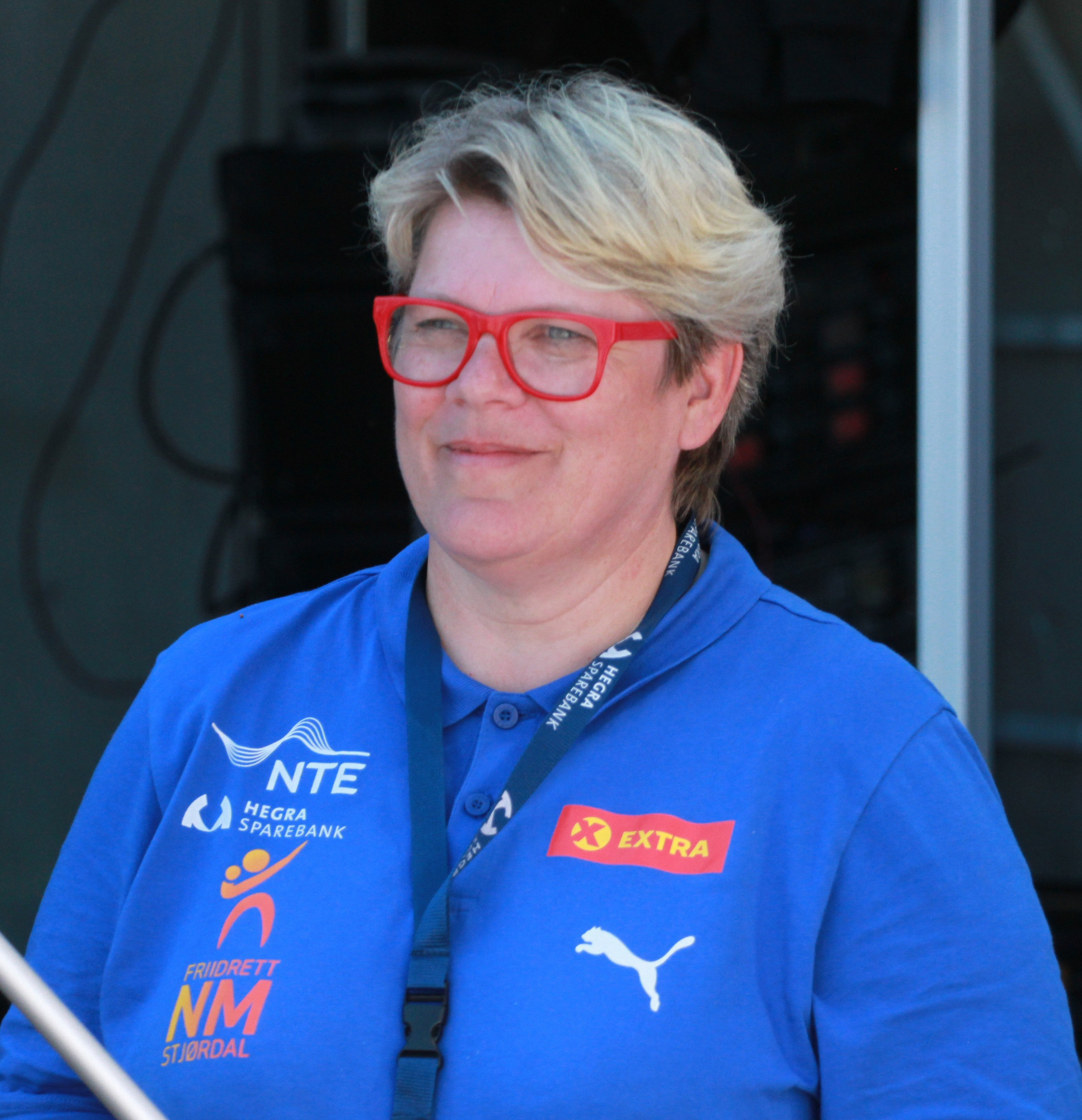
- Hoff in June 2022

Personal information
- Full name: Katarina Sederholm Hoff
- Born: 19 June 1968 (age 58)
- Weight: 94.35 kg (208.0 lb)

Sport
- Country: Norway
- Sport: Weightlifting
- Weight class: +75 kg
- Team: National team
- Updated on 28 September 2016

Katarina Sederholm, married Hoff (born 19 June 1968) is a Finnish-Norwegian shot putter and weightlifter.

Sederholm was an All-American thrower for the UTEP Miners track and field team, placing 6th in the shot put at the 1992 NCAA Division I Indoor Track and Field Championships and 1992 NCAA Division I Outdoor Track and Field Championships.

She competed at the 1994 European Athletics Championships in her native Finland, but finished last. She never became Finnish champion, but won the Finnish indoor championships in 1997.

In 1998 she became a Norwegian citizen, and competed at the 1998 European Championships, again without reaching the final. She became Norwegian champion in 1998, 1999 and 2000 before she retired. She represented the club Stjørdal FIK.

Her personal best throw was 17.49 metres, achieved in 1996. When becoming Norwegian, she immediately set a Norwegian indoor record with 17.25 metres in Stange. The Norwegian outdoor record was 99 centimetres shorter, and when the outdoor season approached, Sederholm set three Norwegian records in a Bislett stadion meet in May 1998: 16.62—16.73—17.00 metres. She improved further to 17.09 metres in June 1998 in Lidingö and 17.11 metres in July 1998 in Hämeenkyrö. The outdoor and indoor records still stand.

As a weightlifter she competed in the +75 kg category when representing Norway at international competitions. She competed at world championships, most recently at the 1999 World Weightlifting Championships. She won the bronze medal in the 83+ class at the 1997 European Weightlifting Championships.

== Major results ==
Year	Venue	Weight	Snatch (kg)				Clean & Jerk (kg)				Total	Rank
Year	Venue	Weight	1	2	3	Rank	1	2	3	Rank	Total	Rank
World Championships
1999	Piraeus, Greece	+75 kg	~~100~~	~~100~~	~~100~~	---	---	---	---	---	0	---
1998	Lahti, Finland	+75 kg	92.5	97.5	~~100~~	8	120	~~125~~	125	7	222.5	7
