= Balkisu Musa =

Nigerian weightlifter (born 1970)

Personal information
- National team: Nigeria
- Born: 1 January 1970 (age 56)

Sport
- Sport: Weightlifting
Medal record
Gold medal – first place	1999 All-Africa Games
Gold medal – first place	1999 All-Africa Games
Gold medal – first place	1999 All-Africa Games
Bronze medal – third place	1999 World Weightlifting Championships	+75 kg

Balkisu Musa (born 1 January 1970) is a Nigerian weightlifter. She won a bronze medal at the 1999 World Weightlifting Championships in the +75 kg category.

== Career ==
Musa came fourth in the 1997 World Weightlifting Championships in the Women's +83 kg category. She won three gold medals at the 1999 All-Africa Games in South Africa. At the 1999 World Weightlifting Championships Musa lifted 252.5 kg (total), winning the bronze medal in the +75 kg category. When female weightlifting was included in the Olympics for the first time at the 2000 Summer Olympics, Musa was disqualified for taking steroids. She was banned for two years in total. At the 2003 World Weightlifting Championships, Musa was ranked 23rd in the +75 kg category, lifting a total of 215 kg.

In 2017, six Nigerian weightlifters trained by Musa participated in the African Junior Weightlifting Championship.
