= International Organization for Biological Control =

Biological pest control

The International Organization for Biological and Integrated Control (IOBC), is an organization, affiliated with the International Union of Biological Sciences (IUBS), organised to promote and study biological pest control, integrated pest management (IPM) and integrated production.

== Introduction ==
The IOBC serves as a resource for international organizations, for example: the European Commission on sustainable use of pesticides and the status of IPM in Europe, the EC Regulation of Biological Control Agents with regard to invertebrate biological control agents, the Consultative Group on International Agricultural Research on IPM, the European and Mediterranean Plant Protection Organization on biological control agents and the Food and Agriculture Organization with respect to the Convention on Biological Diversity.

== History and structure ==
A complete history of the IOBC was published in 1988. Briefly, in 1948, the idea of an international organization on biological control was conceived. By 1950, the IUBS decided to support the establishment of a "Commission Internationale de Lutte Biologique" (CILB) as part of the IUBS Division of Animal Biology and a committee was established to further this concept. In 1955, the statutes of the new organization were ratified by the IUBS and the first plenary session of the CILB took place at Antibes, France. In 1965, CILB changed its name from "Commission" to "Organization" thus becoming the "International Organization of Biological Control of Noxious Animals and Plants". In 1969, under the auspices of the IUBS, an agreement was reached among organizations to merge IOBC and the "International advisory committee for biological Control" (active in English-speaking countries) into a single international organization under the name IOBC. The scientific journal Entomophaga was the official journal of the organization, until superseded by BioControl. In 1971, Global IOBC was established and the former IOBC became the West Palearctic Regional Section.

There are six regional sections world-wide:

- Afrotropical
- Asia and Pacific
- East Palearctic
- Nearctic
- Neotropical
- West Palearctic

== Goals and purpose ==
The IOBC promotes the development of biological control and its application in integrated pest management and international cooperation to these ends.

The IOBC collects, evaluates and disseminates information about biological control and promotes national and international action concerning research, training of personnel, coordination of large-scale application and public awareness of the economic and social importance of biological control.

The IOBC arranges conferences, meetings and symposia, and takes other actions to implement its general objectives.

== Global IOBC ==
In addition to serving as an umbrella organization for the six regional sections, the global organization publishes proceedings of meetings, a newsletter, books, and has 10 working groups. These groups meet to discuss specific topics, usually agricultural pests which may often have a global impact.

=== Quality Control Standards ===
A set of standards were developed for assessing the quality control of commercially produced biological control agents. These guidelines have been used.

=== Commission on Biological Control and Access and Benefit Sharing ===
Under the 1993 Convention on Biological Diversity, countries have sovereign rights over their genetic resources, such as species collected for potential use in biological control. This convention was put in place because the profits from prospecting biodiversity have disproportionately benefited corporations from developed countries. Because researchers and Western businesses complained that giving developing countries such rights is problematic due to the new difficulties in legally acquiring potentially profitable species in several countries, the Commission on Biological Control and Access and Benefit Sharing was established in 2008 to allow such parties access to these resources, with the supposition that any benefits arising from such access should be shared. Parties continue to complain they need more access to the genetic resources of other countries than these standards allow.

=== West Palaearctic Regional Section ===
The West Palaearctic Regional Section (i.e. Europe) is the most active of the regional sections with 20 working groups (that focus on crops, agricultural pests, and other topics) and five commissions which usually meet in different locations in member countries. It produces the IOBC/WPRS Bulletin, which in 2007 was listed as one of the top research journals for the organic industry.

==== Pesticide side-effects standards ====
The "Pesticides and Beneficial Organisms working group" is made up of scientists from many countries. They establish standards, which are periodically updated, for testing the side effects of pesticides on a large range of natural enemies of crop pests, and rank those effects. The purpose of establishing these standards is to be able to compare pesticides by their effect on beneficial organisms throughout all regions of the world. With the results obtained from these standardized tests, the best pesticides can be identified which enable enhanced survival of non-target organisms and the most biological control due to reduced impact on beneficial organisms. These standards have been adopted a number of scientists worldwide.

==== Integrated Production ====
One of the working groups is on Integrated Pest Management and Integrated Production, a concept of agriculture based on the sustainable use of natural resources. This group has established crop specific guidelines for pome fruits, stone fruits, grapes, soft fruits, olives, citrus and field grown vegetables in Europe.

== Official languages ==
The Organization's official languages are English and French, although other languages may be spoken in some regional meetings.

== See also ==
- Biological control
- Integrated pest management
- Integrated production
- Sustainable development
- Sustainable farming
