= Moon Kyung-ae =

South Korean weightlifter (born 1979)

Personal information
- Full name: Moon Kyung-ae
- Born: 4 July 1979 (age 47)
- Height: 168 cm (5 ft 6 in)
- Weight: 95.30 kg (210.1 lb)

Sport
- Country: South Korea
- Sport: Weightlifting
- Weight class: +75 kg
- Team: National team
- Updated on 27 September 2016

Moon Kyung-ae (Korean: 문 경애, born 4 July 1979) was a South Korean weightlifter, competing in the +75 kg category and representing South Korea at international competitions.

She participated at the 2000 Summer Olympics in the +75 kg event. She competed at world championships, most recently at the 2001 World Weightlifting Championships.

== Major results ==
Year	Venue	Weight	Snatch (kg)				Clean & jerk (kg)				Total	Rank
Year	Venue	Weight	1	2	3	Rank	1	2	3	Rank	Total	Rank
Summer Olympics
2000	Sydney, Australia	+75 kg				—N/a				—N/a		7
World Championships
2001	Antalya, Turkey	+75 kg	95	100	105	10	120	125	130	8	235	10
1999	Piraeus, Greece	+75 kg	100	105	~~107.5~~	10	127.5	132.5	137.5	6	242.5	6
