= Udomporn Polsak =

Thai weightlifter (born 1981)

Medal record

Women's Weightlifting

Representing Thailand

Olympic Games
Gold medal – first place	2004 Athens	– 53 kg

World Championships
Gold medal – first place	2003 Vancouver	– 53 kg
Bronze medal – third place	2002 Warsaw	– 53 kg

Asian Games
Silver medal – second place	2002 Busan	– 53 kg

Udomporn Polsak TBh

Military service
- Allegiance: Thailand
- Branch/service: Royal Thai Army
- Rank: Major

Major Udomporn Polsak (Thai: อุดมพร พลศักดิ์ RTGS: Udomphon Phonsak; born October 6, 1981) is a Thai weightlifter.

Udomporn Polsak was born in Nakhon Ratchasima. She graduated from the Bangkok College of Physical Education. She won a silver medal in combined lifts at the 2002 Asian Games, bronze at the 2002 World Championships, and gold at the 2003 Southeast Asian Games.

At the 2003 World Weightlifting Championships in Vancouver, British Columbia, Canada, she won a gold medal, with 100 kg in the snatch and a 222.5 kg total.

She was named 2003 Thai Athlete of the Year by the Sports Authority of Thailand.

At the 2004 Summer Olympics in Athens she became the first Thai woman to win an Olympic gold medal, with 97.5 kg snatching and 222.5 kg total.

She was given the honor to be the torch lighter at the 2007 Southeast Asian Games, held in her country.
