= Melinda Szik =

Hungarian weightlifter

Melinda Szik (December 5, 1974 – November 10, 2012) was a female weightlifter from Hungary. She competed for her native country at the 2000 Summer Olympics in Sydney, where she finished in ninth place in the women's superheavyweight division (+ 75 kg). She was born in Budapest.
