= Kay Thi Win =

Burmese weightlifter

Personal information
- Full name: Kay Thi Win
- Born: 26 May 1975 (age 51)
- Weight: 47.38 kg (104.5 lb)

Sport
- Country: Myanmar
- Sport: Weightlifting
- Weight class: 48 kg
- Team: National team
- Updated on 28 September 2016

Kay Thi Win (born 26 May 1975) is a Burmese former weightlifter, competing in the 48 kg category and representing Myanmar at international competitions.

She competed at world championships, most recently at the 1999 World Weightlifting Championships. She also competed at the Summer Olympics in 2000 in Sydney, Australia in the 48 kg category and narrowly missed out the podium placing fourth, with this performance she still remains as the best Burmese athlete in the entire history of the Olympics.

== Major results ==
Year	Venue	Weight	Snatch (kg)				Clean & Jerk (kg)				Total	Rank
Year	Venue	Weight	1	2	3	Rank	1	2	3	Rank	Total	Rank
World Championships
1999	Piraeus, Greece	48 kg	~~77.5~~	77.5	~~82.5~~	8	~~97.5~~	97.5	~~105~~	7	175	6
