= Cheryl Haworth =

American weightlifter (born 1983)

Personal information
- Born: April 19, 1983 (age 43) Savannah, Georgia, U.S.
Medal record
Women's weightlifting
Representing the United States
Olympic Games
Bronze medal – third place	2000 Sydney	+ 75 kg
World Championships
Bronze medal – third place	2005 Doha	+ 75 kg
Pan American Games
Gold medal – first place	1999 Winnipeg	+ 75 kg

Cheryl Ann Haworth (born April 19, 1983) is an Olympic weightlifter for the United States.

== Early life ==
Haworth was born in Savannah, Georgia, to Shiela and Robert Haworth. She also has two sisters, Katie and Beth. At the age of 12, she began weightlifting to strengthen her muscles for softball. She graduated from Savannah Arts Academy in 2001 and received a degree from Savannah College of Art and Design in 2006.

== Personal life ==
Her youngest sister Katie is also a champion weightlifter. Haworth is also an artist.

== List of weightlifting achievements ==
- Bronze Medalist in Olympic Games (2000)
- Olympic team member (2000 + 2004 + 2008)
- Junior World Champion (2001 + 2002)
- Senior National Champion (1998–2008)
- Silver Medalist in Junior World Championships (1999)
- Pan Am Games Champion (1999)
- Goodwill Games Champion (2001)
- Inducted into the USA Weightlifting Hall of Fame (2015)

== Documentary ==
Strong! is a 2012 documentary by Julie Wyman. It is about Cheryl Haworth's efforts at the end of her career to compete at the 2008 Summer Olympics in Beijing.
