= Tang Gonghong =

Chinese weightlifter (born 1979)

Personal information
- Born: March 5, 1979 (age 47)
Medal record
Women's Weightlifting
Olympic Games
Gold medal – first place	2004 Athens	+ 75 kg
World Championships
Gold medal – first place	1998 Lahti	+ 75 kg
Bronze medal – third place	2002 Warsaw	+ 75 kg
Asian Games
Gold medal – first place	2002 Busan	+ 75 kg

Tang Gonghong (simplified Chinese: 唐功红; traditional Chinese: 唐功紅; pinyin: Táng Gōnghóng; born March 5, 1979, in Fushan, Yantai, Shandong) is a Chinese weightlifter who competed in the 2003 Afro-Asian Games and 2004 Summer Olympics.

She won the gold medal in the over 75 kg class, successfully lifting 182.5 kg (402.37 pounds) in the clean and jerk event.
