= Pukyong National University =

National university in Busan, South Korea

Coordinates: 35°08′03″N 129°06′13″E

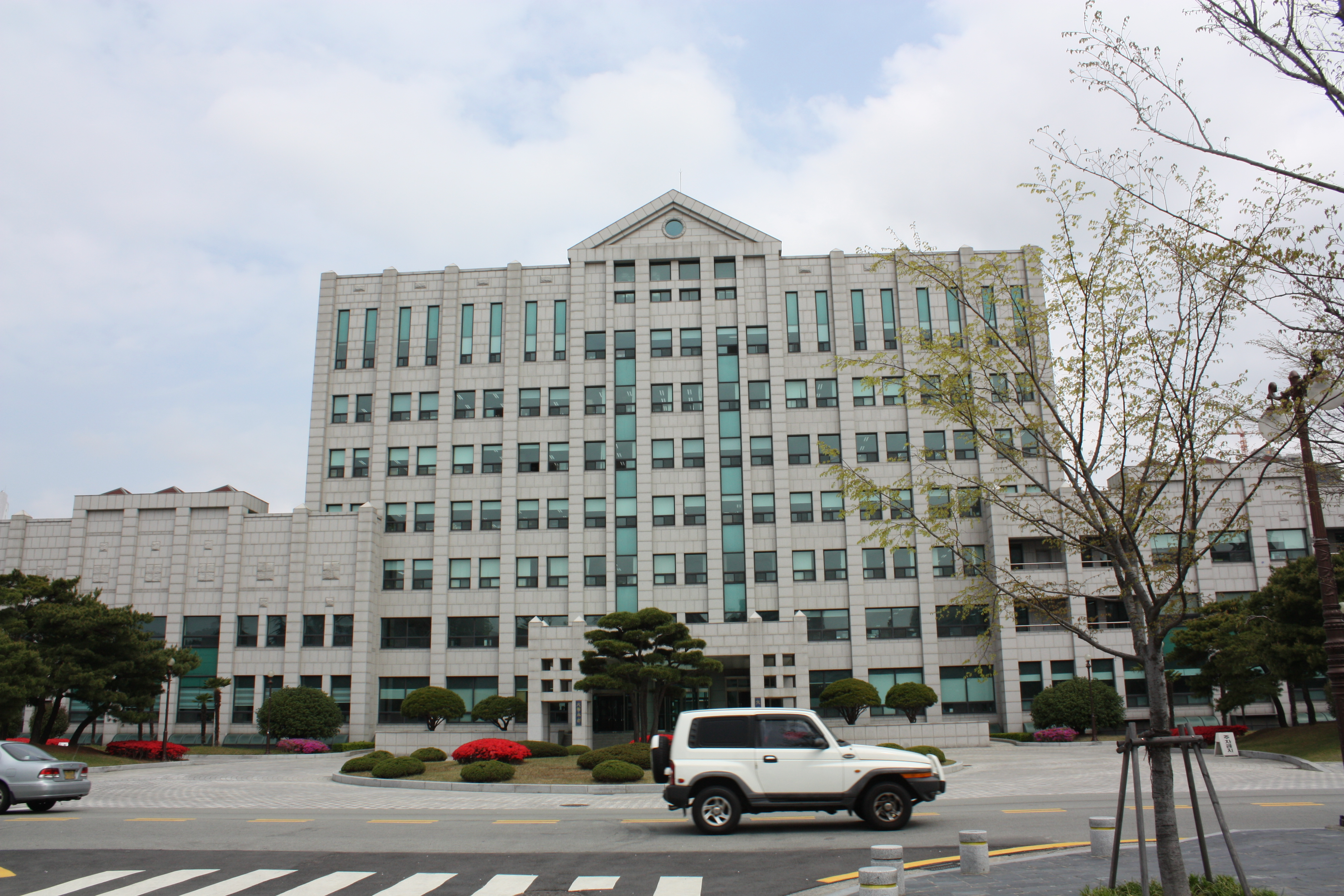
- Motto: Future in our own hands
- Type: National
- Established: 1996
- President: Sang Hoon Bae, Ph.D (배상훈)
- Faculty: 1,748
- Administrative staff: 548
- Students: 23,126
- Location: Busan, South Korea
- Campus: Urban 2 campuses(Daeyeon Campus, Yongdang Campus)
- Website: http://www.pknu.ac.kr/

- Pukyong National University
- Hangul: 국립부경대학교
- Hanja: 國立釜慶大學校
- RR: Gungnip Bugyeong daehakgyo
- MR: Kungnip Pugyŏng taehakkyo

Pukyong National University (PKNU; Korean: 국립부경대학교) is a national university in Busan, South Korea, formed in 1996. The university has two campuses, Daeyeon-dong and Yongdang-dong, situated near the coastal district of Nam-gu. PKNU has a traditional focus on fisheries sciences and other maritime fields, and has extensive facilities for Marine and Technology studies.

The school's symbol mascot is anthropomorphic Moby Dick, "Baek Kyung-i".

== History ==
PKNU was formed in 1996 from the merger of two national universities with long histories, the National Fisheries University of Busan, established in 1941, and the Busan National University of Technology, which was established in 1924.

Historically, Daeyeon-dong was a small fishing village populated by anchovy fishermen. In the early years of the 20th century these fishermen found their products in high demand and they became quite wealthy. They used the money to purchase what is now the Daeyeon-dong campus site and donated it to the government, under the condition that it be used to establish industrial training programs. During the Korean War, the Daeyeon campus was used as U.S. Eighth Army Provisional Command and airfield by the U.S. Air Force. Local residents constructed a large Dol-Jip "stone house" for the commanding officers and pilots. Today this building is used as a Museum.

=== Before Integration (~1996) ===
==== National Fisheries University of Busan ====
The National Fisheries University of Busan was the only higher education institution located in South Gyeongsang Province in Korea under Japanese rule and 5 years after liberation. The other higher education institutes were located in Keijō(4 academies), North Korea region, and South regions including Keijō Imperial University. In 1944, it was renamed Pusan Fisheries University and established Fisheries college in Shimonoseki, Yamaguchi (city).

University rankings

Regional – Overall
- QS Asia: 299 (2025)

On 15 May 1946, when Pusan National University was established, it was integrated into the Department of Fisheries. When it came to July 1947, it became an independent university and was promoted to National Fisheries University of Pusan. Immediately after 16 May 1961, it was forcibly integrated into PNU due to external pressure from the government but separated again from PNU in 1964.

On 6 November 1986, the Department of Fisheries and Oceanography, Science and Engineering, and Social Science were established, and on 1 March 1990, it was promoted to a comprehensive university and reorganized into nine departments (University of Fisheries and Maritime Affairs, College of Natural Sciences, College of Engineering, and College of Humanities and Social Sciences and more). On 1 March 1996, 6 universities and 39 departments were established, 29 master's courses were established in graduate schools, 23 doctoral courses, 4 majors in graduate schools of education, and 16 master's courses in graduate schools of industry.

==== Busan National University of Technology ====
The university was established in Bosu-dong, Jung-gu on 5 May 1924, in the name of Pusan Public Industrial Continuation School (two-year system). The Temporary Special Act on Education and Education was abolished in 1963, which increased the need for higher education. On 29 September 1973, the school was approved for establishment as the National Pusan Technical School (5-year system).

On 7 December 1983, eight departments were established, approved for promotion and reorganization as Pusan Open University (4-year system). On 4 May 1988, the school name was changed to Pusan National University of Technology.

On 6 March 1990, the Graduate School of Industrial Technology was newly established and five departments were opened. On 24 February 1993, the school name was changed to Pusan National University of Technology, after being promoted to a general university. On 1 March 1996, Pusan National University of Technology was integrated into PKNU.

=== After Integration ===
On 6 July 1996, Pusan National University of Fisheries and Pusan National University of Technology were integrated and established with approval for the establishment of Pukyong National University (58 departments under 6 universities), with 31 master's courses, four master's courses in education, and 31 master's courses in the industry. The school name change was discussed from the days of Pusan National University of Fisheries, which was promoted to a general university before the integration, but the school name Pusan National University of Fisheries was used until it was integrated without approval from the Ministry of Education at the time.

In 1996, the International Exchange Center and the European Information Center were established, and in 1997, the University Fisheries Science Research Institute Vancouver was established, and in 1998, a joint laboratory in Daeyeon Campus was established. In 1999, the BK21 Regional Leading Machinery Industry Human Resources Development Project Group was established, and the Pukyong National University Lifelong Education Center was established.

At present, there are around 23,000 students and 1,748 professors across the two campuses, which together cover 673,899 m2. There are three large libraries, two in Daeyeon Dong and one in Yongdang Dong. The campuses are about 4 km apart. A free shuttle bus connects them in about 10–15 minutes.

Although primarily a fisheries university, PKNU has 10 colleges(90 majors) including a large humanities and social sciences department, 7 graduate programs with masters courses in 96 departments, and doctoral courses in 92 departments. In addition, there are 7 research institutes(75 research center).

== Divisions & Department ==
=== College of Humanities and Social Sciences ===
The College of Humanities and Social Sciences aims to teach and study various advanced theories and practices of humanities, society, and design areas to nurture like-minded intellectuals. These may include volunteers who wish to work with justice and do creative design work in various areas such as law, politics, economics, and the media.

- Department of Korean Language and Literature
- Division of English Language and Literature
- Division of Japanese Language and Literature
- Department of History
- Division of Economics
- Department of Law
- Department of Public Administration
- Division of International and Area Studies
- Department of Mass Communication
- Department of Political Science and Diplomacy
- Department of Early Childhood Education
- Department of Fashion Design
- Department of Chinese study

=== College of Information Convergence ===
The College of Information Convergence was made by integrating Engineering divisions and Social Sciences' divisions.

- Division of Data Science and Information
- Division of Media Communication
- Division of Smart Health-care
- Division of Electro-Telecommunication
- Division of Figurative Arts
- Division of Computer Engineering

=== College of Business Administration ===
College of Business Administration (C&BA) aims to teach and study current theory and practical method in the areas of management, finance accounting, tourism and international commerce.

- Division of Business Administration
- Division of International Commerce

=== College of Undeclared and Exploratory Majors ===
The unique Undeclared and Exploratory Major division (UEM) at PKNU offers freedom to choose majors among all the offered programs at PKNU which includes colleges of Humanities and Social Sciences, Natural Sciences, Business Administration, Engineering, Fisheries Sciences, Environmental and Marine Sciences and Technology. Furthermore, students who enroll in the UEM will gain priority access to PKNU's diverse international programs such as international exchange programs, short-term foreign language programs, and international internship programs.

In the 1st year, students will be enrolled in a specialized program which combines variety of intensive English course, general electives, and core courses.

- Division of Undeclared and Exploratory Majors

=== College of Fisheries Science ===
The College of Fisheries Sciences is concerned with wiser management of fish and shellfish stocks for the future ecological relationships between aquatic organisms and their environments, culture of aquatic plants and animals, impacts of human population pressures on the aquatic environment, and development of new seafood products. Both undergraduate and graduate degrees are offered.

- Division of Food Science
- Division of Marine Production System Management
- Division of Marine & Fisheries Business and Economics
- Department of Aquatic Life Medicine
- Department of Marine & Fisheries Industry and Education
- Division of Marine Biology and Science

=== College of Environmental and Marine Science & Technology ===
- Division of Earth & Environment System Sciences
- Department of Energy Resources Engineering
- Department of Ocean Engineering

=== College of Engineering ===
College of Engineering was established as the result of a merger between Pusan National University of Technology and the National Fisheries University of Busan, both of which were national universities offered four-year programs. The college has 12,000 domestic and foreign students in total.

For research and education facilities, there are 5 research centers: a complex practical center of engineering in the Engineering Research Center, the Engineering Education Innovative Center and Women’s Engineering Education Leading Business Team.

- Department of Industrial and Data Engineering
- Division of Electrical Engineering
- Division of Mechanical Engineering
- Division of Energy Transportation System Engineering
- Department of Chemical Engineering
- Division of Industrial Chemistry and Polymer Engineering
- Division of Nanotechnology Convergence Engineering
- Division of Systems Management and Safety Engineering
- Department of Fire Department Engineering
- Division of Convergence Material Engineering
- Department of Architecture
- Division of Sustainable Material Engineering

=== College of Natural Science ===
The College of Natural Science has the educational goal of teaching practical usage of Applied Mathematics, Statistics, Physics, Chemistry, Microbiology, Nursing, Marine sports, etc, and teaches the primary theory of Natural Science and Applied Science in research.

- Department of Applied Mathematics
- Department of Chemistry
- Department of Nursing
- Department of Physics
- Department of Microbiology
- Department of Science System Simulation

== Campus ==
Pukyong National University occupies two Busan-based campuses: the Daeyeon Campus is situated in 45 Yongso-ro, Nam-gu; and the Yongdang Campus is in Yongdang-dong, Nam-gu.

=== Location ===
Daeyeon Campus, the main campus, is located in the southern part of Busan. It is served by its own subway station on Line 2. Yongdang Campus, the engineering campus used to be, is on Yongdang-dong, Busan. The engineering campus moved to Daeyeon in 2019, but some research facilities still remain in Yongdang. There used to be Motgol Campus in the 1990s, but sold to Nam-gu because of the construction of the new city hall.

== Facilities ==
=== Museum ===
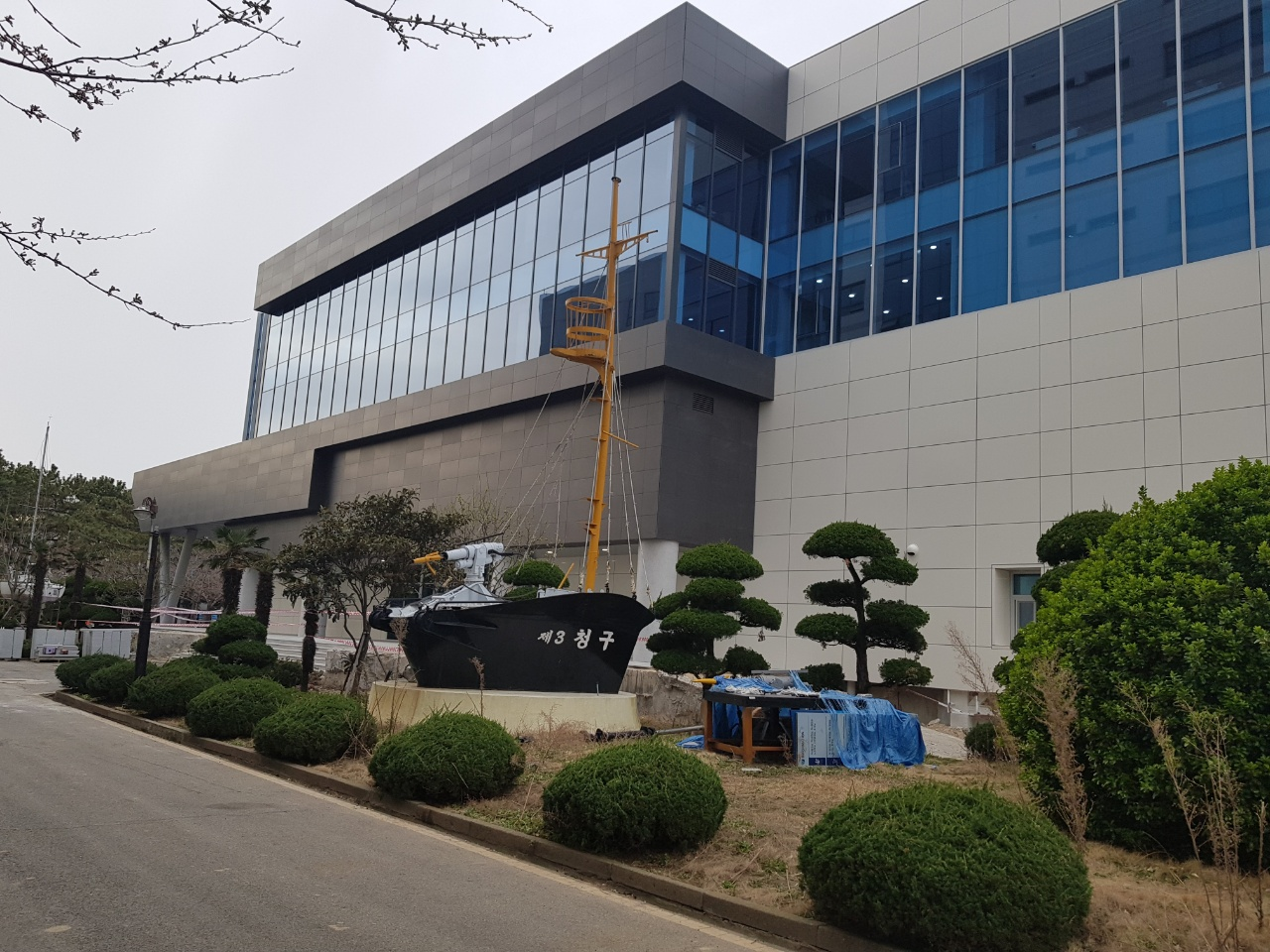
Academic Information Library(Cheongun Building), Daeyeon Campus

PKNU museum is located on the first and second floors of the Cheongun Building. It has the largest collection of materials in the field of fisheries and marine studies among the universities in South Korea. There are 2,278 exhibits including 1,262 cultural properties, 374 marine organisms, 287 items of fishing equipment and fishing boats, 55 vessels, 283 historical materials related to PKNU, and 17 folk materials. Also, there are many exhibits of historical value including a chanfron from the Gaya period, thought to be the earliest chanfron, and armor which was excavated from Dugok Historical Site in Gimhae. In addition, there are many stuffed marine organisms, including a coelacanth, one of only two in Korea. There is also a bone of the southern right whale, giant clam, various sharks, fish which inhabit the coastal waters and the ocean, crustaceans, and sea animals.

The lobby of the Cheongun building contains a Pukyongosaurus Millenniumi, a herbivorous dinosaur which lived in the Korean Peninsula about 140 million years ago, and the first dinosaur to have a Korean name. Its fossil was discovered on the small rocky island located on the coast of Galsa-ri, Geumseong-myeon, Hadong-gun, Gyeongsangnam-do, and restored by a team led by PKNU professor Baek In Seong.

=== Libraries ===
Pukyong National University Library has been reorganized in Daeyeon Campus to suit the function of the campus. Daeyeon Campus has Central library and Academic Information Library, and Yongdang Campus has Engineering library, respectively. In the Central library, there is a studying space restricted access to outsiders, and the access is only possible with a student ID card. In addition, most services such as searching for collection materials, providing original texts, searching for materials from other institutions, and applying for copying are provided on the library's website.

Daeyeon Campus has a 24-hour reading room called "Miraero," where students can study freely study.

=== Busan Radiological Monitoring Station ===
The Busan Radiological Monitoring Station is one of 12 supervisory organizations in the country which have been operated by the Korea Institute of Nuclear Safety (KINS) since 1967 to observe the level of radiation in the atmosphere. It provides the information needed to prepare appropriate countermeasures and prevent atomic accidents in Busan and Gyeongsangnam-do.

== Festival ==
Pukyung National University Festival Events

<May 7-9, 2024>

– May 7: Loco, Woo Won-jae / May 8: B.I.G, Heize / May 9: B.O, Woody

<May 16-18, 2023>

– May 16: Oh My Girl, Hyorin / May 17: MarkTop, Sunsoohee / May 18: Mad Clown

<May 17-18, 2022>

– May 17: Monday Kiz, HyunA / May 18: Punch, Heize

== Notable people and alumni ==
- Heize, singer
- Kim Jae-chul - Honorary Chairman, Dongwon Industries / B.S. in Fishing Technology (National Fisheries University of Busan)
- Song Chi-young – CEO, POSCO Eco & Challenge Co., Ltd. / B.S. in Mechanical Engineering
- Moon Jong-suk - Former CEO, CJ Freshway Corporation / B.S. in International Trade
- Bae Young-hak - Former Executive Director, HD HYUNDAI MIPO / B.S. in Fisheries Management
- Jeon Heung-sik - Former Executive Director, Samsung Fine Chemicals Corporation / B.S. in Fisheries Management
- Kim Hyo-sub - Former Vice President, Samsung Heavy Industries / B.S. in Marine Engineering
- Joo Si-bo - President & CEO, POSCO International / B.S. in Marine Engineering
- Joo Young-heum - CEO, Inca Internet / B.S. in Computer Engineering
- Kang Se-heung - Chairman, William & Margaret Kang Foundation / B.S. in Manufacturing Engineering
- Park Soo-bok - CEO, DAELYUK PLATING / B.S. in Machinery
- Seo Young-ok - CEO, Fine Technology / B.S. in Chemical Engineering
- Chung Yong-pyo - CEO, KAM Co., Ltd. / B.S. in Mechanical Engineering
- Park Se-ho - Chairman, WOOJU SEALINGS GROUP / MBA (Graduate School of Business Administration)
- Kang Jun-seok – Former Vice Minister of Oceans and Fisheries of the Republic of Korea, Former CEO of Busan Port Authority / B.S. in Fisheries Management
- Kim Seok-jo - Former Chairman, Busan Metropolitan Council / B.S. in Architectural Engineering
- Kim Im-kwon - 24th Chairman, National Federation of Fisheries Cooperatives (Suhyup) / B.S. in Fisheries Management
- Kim Young-kyu - 31st President, National Institute of Fisheries Science / Master's in Fisheries Science, Busan National University of Fisheries Graduate School
- Kim Jwa-gwan – Former Chairperson, Presidential Water Commission / B.S. in Environmental Engineering
- Kim Tae-rang - The Secretary general of the National Assembly(23rd)/ B.S. in Food Science and Technology
- Kim Hong-hui - Former Commissioner General of Korea Coast Guard / B.S. in Fishing Technology
- Bae Pyeong-am - 28th President, National Institute of Fisheries Science / B.S. in Aquaculture
- Seo Jang-woo – First Director, National Ocean Science Museum / B.S. in Fisheries Education
- Son Jae-hak - Former Vice Minister of Oceans and Fisheries of the Republic of Korea / B.S. in Resource Biology - Doctor of Maritime Industry Management
- Shin Hyun-seok - 4th Chairman, Korea Fisheries Resources Agency / B.S. in Fisheries Science
- Ahn Jong-gil - 44th & 45th Mayor of Yangsan City / Busan National University of Technology
- Lee Sang-jo - 3rd-5th Mayor of Miryang City / B.S. in Fishing Technology
- Lee Young-ho - Member of the 17th National Assembly of the Republic of Korea / B.S. in Food Science and Technology
- Lee Jong-kook - 6th President, Busan Transportation Corporation / B.S. in Electronic Engineering
- Lee Chang-sub – First Director, National Fire Research Institute / B.S. in Chemical Engineering
- Jeong Young-hoon - 3rd Chairman, Korea Fisheries Resources Agency / B.S. in Food Science and Technology
- Jung Jung-ki - 18th Head of National Fire Service Academy / B.S. in Architectural Engineering
- Cho Il-hwan - director of the National Fisheries Quality Management Service / B.S. in Bio-New Materials
- Cho Hyeon-bae - 16th Commissioner General, Korea Coast Guard / B.S. in Environmental Engineering
- Cheon Yeong-ki - 10th Mayor of Tongyeong City / B.S. in Architectural Engineering
- Choi Yong-seok - 42nd President, National Institute of Fisheries Science / B.S. in Aquaculture
- Choi Wan-hyun - 3rd President, National Marine Biodiversity Institute of Korea / B.S. in Fisheries Management
- Choi Hyeon-dol - 3rd-5th Mayor of Gijang-gun / B.S. in Public Administration
- Ha Jae-ho - 3rd General Director, World Institute of Kimchi / B.S. in Food Science and Technology
- Heo Seong-gon - 17th & 18th Mayor of Gimhae City/ B.S. in Civil Engineering
- Heo Jae-hong - Member of the 13th and 14th National Assembly of the Republic of Korea / National Fisheries University of Busan

== Harukasan software mirror ==
The Harukasan Mirror Station has been hosted by Pukyong National University since 2016. The archive hosts Arch, Debian, and Ubuntu Linux builds in addition to other open-source software.

== See also ==
- List of national universities in South Korea
- List of universities and colleges in South Korea
- Education in Korea
