= Agata Wróbel =

Polish weightlifter (born 1981)

Medal record

Women's weightlifting

Representing Poland
| Event | 1st | 2nd | 3rd |
|---|---|---|---|
| Olympic Games | 0 | 1 | 1 |
| World Championships | 1 | 2 | 0 |
| European Championships | 3 | 1 | 1 |
| Total | 4 | 4 | 2 |

Olympic Games
| Silver medal – second place | 2000 Sydney | + 75 kg |
| Bronze medal – third place | 2004 Athens | + 75 kg |

World Championships
| Gold medal – first place | 2002 Warsaw | + 75 kg |
| Silver medal – second place | 1999 Athens | + 75 kg |
| Silver medal – second place | 2001 Antalya | + 75 kg |

European Championships
| Gold medal – first place | 1999 La Coruña | + 75 kg |
| Gold medal – first place | 2002 Antalya | + 75 kg |
| Gold medal – first place | 2004 Kyiv | + 75 kg |
| Silver medal – second place | 2003 Loutraki | + 75 kg |
| Bronze medal – third place | 1998 Riesa | + 75 kg |

Agata Ewa Wróbel (born August 28, 1981, in Żywiec) is a Polish weightlifter, and is a world record-breaker in the +75 kg category.

She took up weightlifting after watching the men compete in the 1996 Summer Olympics in Atlanta, and after learning that women's weightlifting would be an event at the 2000 Summer Olympics in Sydney.

At the 2000 World Junior Championships her combined total for both the snatch and clean and jerk was a record-breaking 290 kg. She has broken no fewer than 11 world records in the sport. In 2002, she was voted 2nd for world weightlifter of the year.

As well as numerous Junior and World Championship successes, coming first in 2002, she has participated in both the 2000 Summer Olympics and 2004 Summer Olympics in the Women's +75 kg category, winning a silver medal and a bronze medal respectively.

In 2003, she appeared in the [French] documentary "M2A – Mission to Athens", depicting her preparation to the 2004 Summer Olympics in Athens.

After retirement from the sport, she worked in a waste sorting facility.

For her sport achievements, she received:

Golden Cross of Merit in 2000;
Knight's Cross of the Order of Polonia Restituta (5th Class) in 2004.
