= Ding Meiyuan =

Chinese weightlifter (born 1979)

Personal information
- Born: 27 February 1979 (age 47) Dalian, Liaoning
Medal record
Women's weightlifting
Representing China
Olympic Games
Gold medal – first place	2000 Sydney	+75 kg
World Championships
Gold medal – first place	1999 Athens	+75 kg
Gold medal – first place	2003 Vancouver	+75 kg
Asian Games
Gold medal – first place	1998 Bangkok	+75 kg
Asian Championships
Gold medal – first place	2000 Osaka	+75 kg
East Asian Games
Silver medal – second place	2005 Macau	+75 kg
Junior World Championships
Gold medal – first place	1997 Cape Town	+83 kg
National Games of China
Gold medal – first place	1997 Shanghai	+83 kg
Silver medal – second place	2001 Guangdong	+75 kg
Gold medal – first place	2005 Jiangsu	+75 kg

Ding Meiyuan (Chinese: 丁美媛; born 27 February 1979 in Dalian, Liaoning) is a female Chinese weightlifter. She started training at age 12, and joined the provincial team.

She won a gold medal in the women's +75 kg event at the 2000 Summer Olympics.
