= 2005 World Weightlifting Championships – Men's 94 kg =

The 2005 World Weightlifting Championships were held in Doha, Qatar from 9 November to 17 November. The men's 94 kilograms division was staged on 14 and 15 November 2005.

== Schedule ==
Date	Time	Event
14 November 2005	13:00	Group C
15 November 2005	15:00	Group B
15 November 2005	20:00	Group A

== Medalists ==
Event	Gold		Silver		Bronze	
Snatch	Nizami Pashayev (AZE)	185 kg	Mikalai Patotski (BLR)	184 kg	Bakhyt Akhmetov (KAZ)	182 kg
Clean & Jerk	Mukhamat Sozaev (RUS)	221 kg	Yoandry Hernández (CUB)	220 kg	Milen Dobrev (BUL)	218 kg
Total	Nizami Pashayev (AZE)	401 kg	Mukhamat Sozaev (RUS)	398 kg	Milen Dobrev (BUL)	398 kg

== Records ==
Prior to this competition, the existing world records were as follows.

World Record	Snatch	Akakios Kakiasvilis (GRE)	188 kg	Athens, Greece	27 November 1999
World Record	Clean & Jerk	Szymon Kołecki (POL)	232 kg	Sofia, Bulgaria	29 April 2000
World Record	Total	World Standard	417 kg	—	1 January 1998

== Results ==
Rank	Athlete	Group	Body weight	Snatch (kg)				Clean & Jerk (kg)				Total
Rank	Athlete	Group	Body weight	1	2	3	Rank	1	2	3	Rank	Total
1st place, gold medalist(s)	Nizami Pashayev (AZE)	A	92.95	177	182	185	1st place, gold medalist(s)	212	216	~~220~~	4	401
2nd place, silver medalist(s)	Mukhamat Sozaev (RUS)	A	92.69	170	175	177	5	210	215	221	1st place, gold medalist(s)	398
3rd place, bronze medalist(s)	Milen Dobrev (BUL)	A	93.82	~~176~~	176	180	4	210	~~215~~	218	3rd place, bronze medalist(s)	398
4	Bakhyt Akhmetov (KAZ)	A	92.90	177	~~182~~	182	3rd place, bronze medalist(s)	~~210~~	210	215	5	397
5	Asghar Ebrahimi (IRI)	A	93.83	~~175~~	~~175~~	177	6	205	210	~~214~~	9	387
6	Yoandry Hernández (CUB)	B	93.93	165	~~170~~	~~170~~	12	210	215	220	2nd place, silver medalist(s)	385
7	Roman Konstantinov (RUS)	A	93.28	~~170~~	170	~~180~~	9	~~210~~	210	~~217~~	6	380
8	Mikalai Patotski (BLR)	A	92.96	178	181	184	2nd place, silver medalist(s)	195	~~201~~	~~201~~	20	379
9	José Juan Navarro (ESP)	B	92.26	162	166	170	8	203	208	~~210~~	10	378
10	Arsen Kasabiev (GEO)	A	93.41	163	168	~~172~~	10	~~210~~	210	~~217~~	7	378
11	Santiago Martínez (ESP)	A	93.58	171	~~175~~	~~176~~	7	200	205	~~209~~	11	376
12	Nikolaos Kourtidis (GRE)	B	93.53	157	~~162~~	~~162~~	17	200	205	210	8	367
13	Kostyantyn Piliyev (UKR)	B	93.24	162	166	~~169~~	11	200	~~204~~	~~205~~	16	366
14	Ahmed Farghl (EGY)	B	93.98	155	160	163	14	~~201~~	201	~~205~~	15	364
15	Mohamed Eissa (EGY)	B	93.12	~~155~~	~~155~~	155	18	200	204	~~207~~	13	359
16	Jürgen Spieß (GER)	B	93.75	159	~~163~~	~~164~~	15	193	~~200~~	200	17	359
17	Ali Dehghanian (IRI)	B	93.94	155	~~158~~	~~158~~	20	200	204	~~209~~	14	359
18	Robert Murphy (USA)	C	93.92	153	~~158~~	158	16	193	200	~~205~~	19	358
19	Alibay Samadov (AZE)	B	93.90	~~155~~	155	~~160~~	19	185	195	200	18	355
20	Grant Cavit (NZL)	C	93.40	145	~~150~~	150	22	175	182	~~185~~	23	332
21	Yuki Hiraoka (JPN)	C	93.29	~~140~~	~~140~~	140	25	178	183	186	21	326
22	Simplice Ribouem (CMR)	C	90.37	135	140	145	24	175	180	~~190~~	24	325
23	Dalas Santavy (CAN)	C	91.61	130	136	~~139~~	26	175	182	~~185~~	22	318
24	Nurgeldi Gorganow (TKM)	C	88.59	~~135~~	135	~~138~~	27	~~151~~	151	~~157~~	26	286
25	Bidyut Kumar Roy (BAN)	C	93.31	110	115	~~120~~	28	~~150~~	150	155	25	270
—	Attila Kiss (HUN)	C	92.06	148	153	~~155~~	21	~~182~~	~~182~~	—	—	—
—	Vadim Vacarciuc (MDA)	A	93.25	163	~~168~~	~~168~~	13	~~207~~	~~207~~	—	—	—
—	Gábor Vaspöri (HUN)	C	93.56	~~142~~	142	146	23	~~175~~	~~175~~	~~178~~	—	—
—	Eugen Bratan (MDA)	B	93.62	~~175~~	~~175~~	~~175~~	—	205	~~210~~	~~215~~	12	—
DQ	Andrus Utsar (EST)	B	93.05	165	~~169~~	~~169~~	—	198	~~202~~	~~202~~	—	—
