= 2007 World Weightlifting Championships – Men's 94 kg =

The men's competition in 94 kg division was staged on September 22–23, 2007.

== Schedule ==
Date	Time	Event
22 September 2007	09:30	Group D
23 September 2007	09:30	Group C
23 September 2007	14:30	Group B
23 September 2007	20:00	Group A

== Medalists ==
Event	Gold		Silver		Bronze	
Snatch	Roman Konstantinov (RUS)	177 kg	Eduard Tyukin (KAZ)	176 kg	Eugen Bratan (MDA)	175 kg
Clean & Jerk	Yoandry Hernández (CUB)	220 kg	Roman Konstantinov (RUS)	220 kg	Szymon Kołecki (POL)	219 kg
Total	Roman Konstantinov (RUS)	397 kg	Yoandry Hernández (CUB)	393 kg	Szymon Kołecki (POL)	392 kg

== Records ==
Prior to this competition, the existing world records were as follows.

World Record	Snatch	Akakios Kakiasvilis (GRE)	188 kg	Athens, Greece	27 November 1999
World Record	Clean & Jerk	Szymon Kołecki (POL)	232 kg	Sofia, Bulgaria	29 April 2000
World Record	Total	World Standard	417 kg	—	1 January 1998

== Results ==
Rank	Athlete	Group	Body weight	Snatch (kg)				Clean & Jerk (kg)				Total
Rank	Athlete	Group	Body weight	1	2	3	Rank	1	2	3	Rank	Total
1st place, gold medalist(s)	Roman Konstantinov (RUS)	A	93.63	172	177	~~180~~	1st place, gold medalist(s)	211	217	220	2nd place, silver medalist(s)	397
2nd place, silver medalist(s)	Yoandry Hernández (CUB)	A	92.46	167	~~173~~	173	4	212	~~220~~	220	1st place, gold medalist(s)	393
3rd place, bronze medalist(s)	Szymon Kołecki (POL)	A	93.79	173	~~176~~	~~176~~	7	219	~~225~~	~~225~~	3rd place, bronze medalist(s)	392
4	Andrey Demanov (RUS)	A	93.43	~~170~~	170	~~175~~	10	210	217	~~224~~	4	387
5	Konstantinos Papadopoulos (GRE)	A	92.84	170	~~175~~	~~176~~	9	210	~~216~~	216	6	386
6	Eduard Tyukin (KAZ)	A	93.42	170	~~175~~	176	2nd place, silver medalist(s)	200	210	~~215~~	8	386
7	Joel Sotolongo (CUB)	B	93.54	161	166	168	12	203	210	217	5	385
8	Bartłomiej Bonk (POL)	A	93.50	~~173~~	~~173~~	173	6	210	~~215~~	~~219~~	9	383
9	Hakan Yılmaz (TUR)	A	93.80	165	~~170~~	~~170~~	19	205	211	~~213~~	7	376
10	Vadim Vacarciuc (MDA)	A	93.62	167	~~171~~	~~171~~	15	208	~~212~~	~~212~~	12	375
11	Arsen Kasabiev (GEO)	A	92.81	165	~~170~~	~~170~~	17	208	~~217~~	—	11	373
12	Santiago Martínez (ESP)	B	93.47	167	170	173	5	195	200	~~205~~	21	373
13	Jürgen Spieß (GER)	A	93.64	165	169	171	8	202	~~208~~	~~210~~	16	373
14	Kim Seon-jong (KOR)	B	90.69	155	160	162	21	200	207	~~212~~	13	369
15	Anatoliy Mushyk (UKR)	B	90.92	165	~~169~~	169	11	195	200	~~203~~	18	369
16	Kostyantyn Piliyev (UKR)	B	93.69	160	~~165~~	~~165~~	24	203	209	~~212~~	10	369
17	Donatas Anuškevičius (LTU)	B	91.16	~~165~~	165	~~167~~	16	196	200	~~205~~	19	365
18	Alibay Samadov (AZE)	B	93.17	155	159	160	22	200	203	~~206~~	14	363
19	Ivan Efremov (UZB)	B	93.66	155	160	164	20	190	199	~~202~~	23	363
20	Edgar Gevorgyan (ARM)	C	88.36	156	162	167	13	186	191	195	24	362
21	Wilmer Torres (COL)	B	90.90	~~156~~	156	~~160~~	25	195	200	~~207~~	17	356
22	Moez Hannachi (TUN)	B	93.42	165	~~168~~	~~173~~	18	185	190	~~198~~	31	355
23	Mohamed Eissa (EGY)	B	93.46	155	~~160~~	~~160~~	29	200	~~208~~	~~208~~	20	355
24	Hsieh Wei-chun (TPE)	C	93.54	~~150~~	150	155	30	192	~~199~~	199	22	354
25	Sevak Sahakyan (ARM)	B	93.33	155	160	~~164~~	23	~~190~~	190	~~195~~	30	350
26	Vincent Mugnier (FRA)	C	93.36	150	155	~~158~~	28	190	195	~~200~~	25	350
27	Ruslan Ramazanow (TKM)	C	92.01	~~155~~	~~155~~	155	26	186	~~192~~	192	27	347
28	Sergey Sedov (KAZ)	C	93.05	~~152~~	152	~~160~~	31	190	~~196~~	~~196~~	29	342
29	Khunchai Nuchpum (THA)	C	93.42	~~147~~	~~147~~	147	34	185	191	195	26	342
30	Yuki Hiraoka (JPN)	C	93.43	145	150	~~153~~	33	186	192	~~195~~	28	342
31	Attila Kiss (HUN)	C	93.14	155	~~160~~	~~160~~	27	185	~~190~~	~~190~~	34	340
32	Marco Di Marzio (ITA)	D	91.18	150	~~155~~	~~155~~	32	175	185	~~190~~	33	335
33	Abbas Fadhel (IRQ)	C	93.68	~~145~~	145	~~152~~	35	185	~~188~~	~~188~~	35	330
34	Tarso (INA)	C	93.88	140	~~147~~	~~148~~	39	185	~~190~~	190	32	330
35	Thomas Yule (GBR)	D	93.96	142	~~147~~	~~147~~	38	~~170~~	~~175~~	175	36	317
36	Mark Clegg (GBR)	D	93.94	~~142~~	142	~~146~~	37	165	170	~~175~~	38	312
37	Nguyễn Quốc Hải (VIE)	D	85.32	120	126	~~131~~	40	160	170	~~175~~	37	296
—	Eugen Bratan (MDA)	A	93.52	175	~~177~~	~~177~~	3rd place, bronze medalist(s)	~~210~~	~~210~~	~~210~~	—	—
—	José Juan Navarro (ESP)	B	92.88	162	167	~~170~~	14	~~200~~	~~200~~	~~200~~	—	—
—	Sacha Amédé (CAN)	D	93.23	143	~~148~~	~~148~~	36	—	—	—	—	—
—	Pavel Kolosovski (ISR)	C	85.85	~~142~~	~~142~~	~~142~~	—	~~180~~	~~180~~	~~180~~	—	—
—	René Horn (GER)	C	93.85	~~150~~	~~153~~	~~153~~	—	195	203	~~207~~	15	—
DQ	Ruslan Kapaev (KGZ)	D	92.91	155	165	~~170~~	—	190	197	—	—	—
