= 2003 World Weightlifting Championships – Men's 94 kg =

The 2003 World Weightlifting Championships were held in Vancouver, Canada from 14 November to 22 November. The men's 94 kilograms division was staged on 19 and 20 November 2003.

== Schedule ==
Date	Time	Event
19 November 2003	14:00	Group D
20 November 2003	10:00	Group C
20 November 2003	15:00	Group B
20 November 2003	20:00	Group A

== Medalists ==
Event	Gold		Silver		Bronze	
Snatch	Milen Dobrev (BUL)	185.0 kg	Aleksey Petrov (RUS)	185.0 kg	Pavel Harkavy (BLR)	182.5 kg
Clean & Jerk	Vadim Vacarciuc (MDA)	222.5 kg	Milen Dobrev (BUL)	220.0 kg	Hakan Yılmaz (TUR)	220.0 kg
Total	Milen Dobrev (BUL)	405.0 kg	Hakan Yılmaz (TUR)	400.0 kg	Vadim Vacarciuc (MDA)	400.0 kg

== Records ==
Prior to this competition, the existing world records were as follows.

World record	Snatch	Akakios Kakiasvilis (GRE)	188.0 kg	Athens, Greece	27 November 1999
World record	Clean & jerk	Szymon Kołecki (POL)	232.5 kg	Sofia, Bulgaria	29 April 2000
World record	Total	World Standard	417.5 kg	—	1 January 1998

== Results ==
Rank	Athlete	Group	Body weight	Snatch (kg)				Clean & Jerk (kg)				Total
Rank	Athlete	Group	Body weight	1	2	3	Rank	1	2	3	Rank	Total
1st place, gold medalist(s)	Milen Dobrev (BUL)	A	93.13	180.0	185.0	~~187.5~~	1st place, gold medalist(s)	~~220.0~~	220.0	~~222.5~~	2nd place, silver medalist(s)	405.0
2nd place, silver medalist(s)	Hakan Yılmaz (TUR)	A	93.26	170.0	175.0	180.0	4	210.0	217.5	220.0	3rd place, bronze medalist(s)	400.0
3rd place, bronze medalist(s)	Vadim Vacarciuc (MDA)	A	93.37	~~172.5~~	172.5	177.5	7	217.5	222.5	~~225.0~~	1st place, gold medalist(s)	400.0
4	Nikolay Stoyanov (BUL)	A	93.44	170.0	175.0	177.5	8	210.0	~~217.5~~	217.5	5	395.0
5	Sergey Zhukov (RUS)	A	92.98	172.5	177.5	~~180.0~~	6	~~212.5~~	212.5	~~217.5~~	7	390.0
6	Tadeusz Drzazga (POL)	A	93.62	170.0	175.0	~~177.5~~	10	210.0	215.0	~~217.5~~	6	390.0
7	Julio Luna (VEN)	B	93.71	~~162.5~~	162.5	167.5	17	212.5	220.0	~~222.5~~	4	387.5
8	Kourosh Bagheri (IRI)	A	93.31	175.0	~~180.0~~	~~180.0~~	9	~~207.5~~	207.5	~~212.5~~	9	382.5
9	Oliver Caruso (GER)	A	93.53	172.5	~~177.5~~	~~177.5~~	11	205.0	207.5	—	10	380.0
10	Najim Al-Radwan (KSA)	B	92.97	162.5	167.5	170.0	13	202.5	207.5	~~210.0~~	8	377.5
11	Valeri Pokryvchak (UKR)	B	93.23	~~170.0~~	~~170.0~~	170.0	14	~~205.0~~	205.0	~~210.0~~	11	375.0
12	Pavel Harkavy (BLR)	B	93.80	172.5	177.5	182.5	3rd place, bronze medalist(s)	~~192.5~~	192.5	~~197.5~~	21	375.0
13	Sándor Diószegi (HUN)	B	93.26	160.0	165.0	167.5	16	200.0	~~205.0~~	~~205.0~~	14	367.5
14	Chae Yong-ki (KOR)	B	90.30	160.0	165.0	~~170.0~~	20	200.0	~~205.0~~	~~205.0~~	13	365.0
15	Santiago Martínez (ESP)	B	93.26	~~170.0~~	~~170.0~~	170.0	15	195.0	~~202.5~~	~~202.5~~	17	365.0
16	Lee Ung-jo (KOR)	B	93.61	~~160.0~~	160.0	~~165.0~~	27	~~200.0~~	200.0	202.5	12	362.5
17	Jairo Cossio (COL)	C	89.91	160.0	~~165.0~~	165.0	19	190.0	~~195.0~~	195.0	16	360.0
18	Andrey Makarov (KAZ)	C	91.49	165.0	170.0	~~175.0~~	12	185.0	190.0	~~192.5~~	22	360.0
19	Botir Usmanov (UZB)	C	91.68	160.0	~~165.0~~	165.0	21	180.0	187.5	192.5	20	357.5
20	Adem Kala (NED)	C	93.90	152.5	157.5	~~160.0~~	28	192.5	~~197.5~~	197.5	15	355.0
21	Alibay Samadov (AZE)	C	93.46	155.0	160.0	—	26	195.0	~~202.5~~	~~202.5~~	18	355.0
22	Jürgen Spieß (GER)	C	90.58	155.0	160.0	~~162.5~~	24	192.5	~~197.5~~	~~197.5~~	19	352.5
23	Alphonse Matam (FRA)	C	93.24	155.0	160.0	~~162.5~~	25	185.0	190.0	~~195.0~~	23	350.0
24	Marco Di Marzio (ITA)	D	90.63	150.0	~~157.5~~	~~157.5~~	30	175.0	180.0	185.0	25	335.0
25	Jason Gump (USA)	C	93.55	145.0	~~150.0~~	~~150.0~~	35	190.0	~~195.0~~	~~195.0~~	24	335.0
26	Robert Murphy (USA)	D	92.62	145.0	~~150.0~~	~~150.0~~	34	177.5	182.5	185.0	26	330.0
27	Paul Supple (GBR)	D	93.16	142.5	150.0	~~152.5~~	31	175.0	180.0	~~185.0~~	28	330.0
28	Ali Al-Darwish (KSA)	D	90.20	140.0	~~145.0~~	145.0	33	180.0	~~187.5~~	~~190.0~~	27	325.0
29	Simon Heffernan (AUS)	D	93.16	~~140.0~~	~~140.0~~	140.0	36	~~180.0~~	180.0	~~187.5~~	29	320.0
30	Dennis Crespo (PUR)	D	88.30	127.5	132.5	~~137.5~~	37	165.0	~~170.0~~	~~170.0~~	31	297.5
31	Balazs Sandor (CAN)	D	92.48	~~130.0~~	130.0	~~135.0~~	38	160.0	—	—	32	290.0
—	Andrei Rybakou (BLR)	B	88.25	~~172.5~~	~~172.5~~	~~172.5~~	—	—	—	—	—	—
—	Jiří Mandát (CZE)	C	92.42	~~155.0~~	155.0	~~157.5~~	29	—	—	—	—	—
—	Nizami Pashayev (AZE)	A	92.74	172.5	~~177.5~~	177.5	5	~~207.5~~	~~207.5~~	~~207.5~~	—	—
—	Mohamed Mousa (EGY)	B	93.25	165.0	~~167.5~~	~~170.0~~	22	~~200.0~~	—	—	—	—
—	Bakhyt Akhmetov (KAZ)	A	93.31	~~180.0~~	~~180.0~~	~~180.0~~	—	~~207.5~~	~~207.5~~	~~207.5~~	—	—
—	Thomas Yule (GBR)	D	93.46	~~150.0~~	~~150.0~~	~~150.0~~	—	175.0	~~185.0~~	~~190.0~~	30	—
—	Aleksander Karapetyan (AUS)	B	93.49	~~170.0~~	~~170.0~~	~~170.0~~	—	—	—	—	—	—
—	Fazilbek Urazimbetov (UZB)	C	93.49	~~150.0~~	~~150.0~~	150.0	32	~~195.0~~	~~195.0~~	~~195.0~~	—	—
—	Aleksey Petrov (RUS)	A	93.60	~~180.0~~	180.0	185.0	2nd place, silver medalist(s)	~~220.0~~	~~220.0~~	~~222.5~~	—	—
—	Mohammed Jasim (IRQ)	C	93.70	—	—	—	—	—	—	—	—	—
—	Moez Hannachi (TUN)	C	93.74	~~165.0~~	165.0	~~172.5~~	23	~~190.0~~	~~190.0~~	~~192.5~~	—	—
—	Arkadiusz Białek (POL)	B	93.79	167.5	~~172.5~~	~~172.5~~	18	~~202.5~~	~~202.5~~	~~202.5~~	—	—
