= Weightlifting at the 2004 Summer Olympics – Men's 94 kg =

Weightlifting at the Olympics

Men's 94 kg at the Games of the XXVIII Olympiad
- Venue: Nikaia Olympic Weightlifting Hall
- Date: 23 August 2004
- Competitors: 25 from 18 nations

Medalists
1st place, gold medalist(s)		Milen Dobrev	Bulgaria
2nd place, silver medalist(s)		Khadzhimurat Akkaev	Russia
3rd place, bronze medalist(s)		Eduard Tyukin	Russia

The men's 94 kilograms weightlifting event at the 2004 Summer Olympics in Athens, Greece took place at the Nikaia Olympic Weightlifting Hall on 23 August.

Total score was the sum of the lifter's best result in each of the snatch and the clean and jerk, with three lifts allowed for each lift. In case of a tie, the lighter lifter won; if still tied, the lifter who took the fewest attempts to achieve the total score won. Lifters without a valid snatch score did not perform the clean and jerk.

== Schedule ==
All times are Eastern European Summer Time (UTC+03:00)

Date	Time	Event
23 August 2004	16:30	Group B
23 August 2004	20:00	Group A

== Records ==
{{{caption}}}
World Record	Snatch	Akakios Kakiasvilis (GRE)	188.0 kg	Athens, Greece	27 November 1999
World Record	Clean & Jerk	Szymon Kołecki (POL)	232.5 kg	Sofia, Bulgaria	29 April 2000
World Record	Total	World Standard	417.5 kg	—	1 January 1998
Olympic Record	Snatch	Olympic Standard	187.5 kg	—	1 January 1997
Olympic Record	Clean & Jerk	Olympic Standard	227.5 kg	—	1 January 1997
Olympic Record	Total	Olympic Standard	415.0 kg	—	1 January 1997

== Results ==
Rank	Athlete	Group	Body weight	Snatch (kg)				Clean & Jerk (kg)				Total
Rank	Athlete	Group	Body weight	1	2	3	Result	1	2	3	Result	Total
1st place, gold medalist(s)	Milen Dobrev (BUL)	A	92.58	180.0	185.0	187.5	187.5	217.5	220.0	~~225.0~~	220.0	407.5
2nd place, silver medalist(s)	Khadzhimurat Akkaev (RUS)	A	93.74	180.0	185.0	~~187.5~~	185.0	215.0	~~220.0~~	220.0	220.0	405.0
3rd place, bronze medalist(s)	Eduard Tyukin (RUS)	A	93.16	177.5	182.5	~~185.0~~	182.5	215.0	~~220.0~~	~~220.0~~	215.0	397.5
4	Shahin Nassirinia (IRI)	A	92.89	172.5	~~177.5~~	~~177.5~~	172.5	215.0	220.0	~~225.0~~	220.0	392.5
5	Julio Luna (VEN)	A	93.35	~~170.0~~	170.0	~~175.0~~	170.0	215.0	220.0	~~225.0~~	220.0	390.0
6	Hakan Yılmaz (TUR)	A	93.45	175.0	~~180.0~~	~~180.0~~	175.0	215.0	~~225.0~~	~~225.0~~	215.0	390.0
7	Bakhyt Akhmetov (KAZ)	A	93.56	180.0	~~185.0~~	~~185.0~~	180.0	210.0	~~215.0~~	~~215.0~~	210.0	390.0
8	Anatoliy Mushyk (UKR)	A	89.33	170.0	175.0	~~177.5~~	175.0	207.5	212.5	~~215.0~~	212.5	387.5
9	Santiago Martínez (ESP)	B	93.35	170.0	175.0	~~180.0~~	175.0	200.0	~~207.5~~	207.5	207.5	382.5
10	Eugen Bratan (MDA)	B	93.10	170.0	175.0	~~180.0~~	175.0	205.0	~~210.0~~	~~210.0~~	205.0	380.0
11	Nikolaos Kourtidis (GRE)	A	92.39	~~167.5~~	~~167.5~~	167.5	167.5	210.0	~~215.0~~	~~215.0~~	210.0	377.5
12	Yoandry Hernández (CUB)	B	90.94	~~167.5~~	~~167.5~~	167.5	167.5	207.5	~~212.5~~	~~212.5~~	207.5	375.0
13	Tadeusz Drzazga (POL)	B	92.43	162.5	167.5	170.0	170.0	200.0	~~207.5~~	~~207.5~~	200.0	370.0
14	Arsen Kasabiev (GEO)	B	91.20	150.0	155.0	~~160.0~~	155.0	195.0	~~205.0~~	207.5	207.5	362.5
15	Alibay Samadov (AZE)	B	92.70	155.0	160.0	165.0	165.0	195.0	~~200.0~~	—	195.0	360.0
16	Asghar Ebrahimi (IRI)	B	93.72	~~165.0~~	165.0	~~172.5~~	165.0	190.0	~~200.0~~	~~202.5~~	190.0	355.0
17	Darío Lecman (ARG)	B	93.37	~~155.0~~	155.0	~~165.0~~	155.0	~~185.0~~	185.0	—	185.0	340.0
18	Furkat Saidov (UZB)	B	85.22	135.0	145.0	~~150.0~~	145.0	165.0	170.0	175.0	175.0	320.0
19	Junior Faro (ARU)	B	93.82	132.5	137.5	140.0	140.0	~~167.5~~	167.5	~~175.0~~	167.5	307.5
—	Nizami Pashayev (AZE)	A	92.45	~~180.0~~	~~180.0~~	~~180.0~~	—	—	—	—	—	—
—	Nikolay Kolev (BUL)	A	92.89	177.5	~~180.0~~	~~180.0~~	177.5	~~217.5~~	~~217.5~~	~~217.5~~	—	—
—	Akakios Kakiasvilis (GRE)	A	91.28	~~180.0~~	180.0	~~185.0~~	180.0	~~220.0~~	~~220.0~~	~~220.0~~	—	—
—	Najim Al-Radwan (KSA)	B	92.76	~~162.5~~	~~162.5~~	~~162.5~~	—	—	—	—	—	—
—	Vadim Vacarciuc (MDA)	A	93.35	~~175.0~~	~~175.0~~	~~175.0~~	—	—	—	—	—	—
—	Ramzi Al-Mahrous (KSA)	B	90.81	150.0	~~155.0~~	~~155.0~~	150.0	~~190.0~~	~~190.0~~	~~190.0~~	—	—
