= Weightlifting at the 2002 Commonwealth Games – Men's 94 kg =

Weightlifting – Men's 94 kg at the 2002 Commonwealth Games
- Venue: Manchester International Convention Centre
- Dates: 2 August 2002
- Competitors: 13 from 13 nations
- Winning total weight: 365

Medalists
gold medal	Aleksander Karapetyan	Australia
silver medal	David Guest	England
bronze medal	Julien Galipeau	Canada

The Men's 94 kg weightlifting event at the 2002 Commonwealth Games took place at the Manchester International Convention Centre on 2 August 2002. The weightlifter from Australia won the gold, with a combined lift of 365 kg.

== Schedule ==
All times are Coordinated Universal Time (UTC)

Date	Time	Event
2 August 2002	10:00	Group A

== Records ==
Prior to this competition, the existing world, Commonwealth and Games records were as follows:

World record	Snatch	Akakios Kakiasvilis (GRE)	188.0 kg	Athens, Greece	27 November 1999
World record	Clean & Jerk	Szymon Kołecki (POL)	232.5 kg	Sofia, Bulgaria	29 April 2000
World record	Total	World Standard	417.5 kg	–	1 January 1998
Commonwealth record	Snatch	Aleksander Karapetyan (AUS)	182.5 kg	Antalya, Turkey	9 November 2001
Commonwealth record	Clean & Jerk	Aleksander Karapetyan (AUS)	210.0 kg	Antalya, Turkey	9 November 2001
Commonwealth record	Total	Aleksander Karapetyan (AUS)	392.5 kg	Antalya, Turkey	9 November 2001
Games record	Snatch	Kiril Kounev (AUS)	165.0 kg	Kuala Lumpur, Malaysia	18 September 1998
Games record	Clean & Jerk	Kiril Kounev (AUS)	205.0 kg	Kuala Lumpur, Malaysia	18 September 1998
Games record	Total	Kiril Kounev (AUS)	370.0 kg	Kuala Lumpur, Malaysia	18 September 1998

The following records were established during the competition:

Snatch	167.5 kg	Aleksander Karapetyan (AUS)	GR

== Results ==
Rank	Athlete	Nation	Group	Body weight	Snatch (kg)					Clean & Jerk (kg)					Total
Rank	Athlete	Nation	Group	Body weight	1	2	3	Result	Rank	1	2	3	Result	Rank	Total
1st place, gold medalist(s)	Aleksander Karapetyan	Australia	A	—	162.5	167.5	–	167.5	1st place, gold medalist(s)	197.5	~~215.0~~	–	197.5	1st place, gold medalist(s)	365.0
2nd place, silver medalist(s)	David Guest	England	A	—	152.5	157.5	160.0	160.0	2nd place, silver medalist(s)	~~185.0~~	185.0	~~192.5~~	185.0	5	345.0
3rd place, bronze medalist(s)	Julien Galipeau	Canada	A	—	145.0	150.0	~~155.0~~	150.0	5	185.0	192.5	~~195.0~~	192.5	2nd place, silver medalist(s)	342.5
4	Karl Grant	England	A	—	150.0	~~155.0~~	~~155.0~~	150.0	6	187.5	~~195.0~~	~~195.0~~	187.5	3rd place, bronze medalist(s)	337.5
5	Hassan Aslam	Pakistan	A	—	150.0	~~155.0~~	~~155.0~~	150.0	4	185.0	~~190.0~~	~~190.0~~	185.0	4	335.0
6	Steven Baccus	Seychelles	A	—	140.0	~~147.5~~	~~147.5~~	140.0	7	180.0	~~185.0~~	~~185.0~~	180.0	6	320.0
7	Guy Marineau	Canada	A	—	135.0	~~140.0~~	140.0	140.0	8	~~175.0~~	175.0	~~180.0~~	175.0	7	315.0
8	Marea Teoiaki	Kiribati	A	—	115.0	122.5	125.0	125.0	9	155.0	160.0	165.0	165.0	8	290.0
9	Andrew Joy	Wales	A	—	120.0	~~122.5~~	~~122.5~~	120.0	10	157.5	162.5	~~170.0~~	162.5	9	282.5
10	Marcus Cook	Nauru	A	—	112.5	117.5	~~120.0~~	117.5	12	147.5	~~155.0~~	~~155.0~~	147.5	10	265.0
11	Ravi Bhollah	Mauritius	A	—	120.0	~~125.0~~	~~125.0~~	120.0	11	140.0	145.0	~~150.0~~	145.0	11	265.0
12	Fisa Pihigia	Niue	A	—	82.5	87.5	~~92.5~~	87.5	13	117.5	~~122.5~~	~~127.5~~	117.5	12	205.0
–	Thomas Yule	Scotland	A	—	~~147.5~~	152.5	157.5	157.5	3rd place, bronze medalist(s)	~~182.5~~	~~182.5~~	~~185.0~~	–	–	–
