= 2002 World Weightlifting Championships – Men's 94 kg =

The 2002 World Weightlifting Championships were held in Warsaw, Poland from 19 November to 26 November. The men's 94 kilograms division was staged on 24 November 2002.

== Schedule ==
Date	Time	Event
24 November 2002	11:00	Group B
24 November 2002	17:00	Group A

== Medalists ==
Event	Gold		Silver		Bronze	
Snatch	Oliver Caruso (GER)	180.0 kg	Nizami Pashayev (AZE)	177.5 kg	Milen Dobrev (BUL)	175.0 kg
Clean & Jerk	Nizami Pashayev (AZE)	215.0 kg	Milen Dobrev (BUL)	212.5 kg	Kourosh Bagheri (IRI)	210.0 kg
Total	Nizami Pashayev (AZE)	392.5 kg	Milen Dobrev (BUL)	387.5 kg	Oliver Caruso (GER)	387.5 kg

== Records ==
Prior to this competition, the existing world records were as follows.

World Record	Snatch	Akakios Kakiasvilis (GRE)	188.0 kg	Athens, Greece	27 November 1999
World Record	Clean & Jerk	Szymon Kołecki (POL)	232.5 kg	Sofia, Bulgaria	29 April 2000
World Record	Total	World Standard	417.5 kg	—	1 January 1998

== Results ==
Rank	Athlete	Group	Body weight	Snatch (kg)				Clean & Jerk (kg)				Total
Rank	Athlete	Group	Body weight	1	2	3	Rank	1	2	3	Rank	Total
1st place, gold medalist(s)	Nizami Pashayev (AZE)	A	92.65	177.5	~~182.5~~	~~182.5~~	2nd place, silver medalist(s)	212.5	215.0	~~222.5~~	1st place, gold medalist(s)	392.5
2nd place, silver medalist(s)	Milen Dobrev (BUL)	A	93.25	~~175.0~~	175.0	~~177.5~~	3rd place, bronze medalist(s)	212.5	~~220.0~~	~~220.0~~	2nd place, silver medalist(s)	387.5
3rd place, bronze medalist(s)	Oliver Caruso (GER)	A	93.90	172.5	177.5	180.0	1st place, gold medalist(s)	202.5	207.5	~~212.5~~	4	387.5
4	Aleksander Karapetyan (AUS)	A	94.00	175.0	~~180.0~~	~~180.0~~	4	207.5	~~212.5~~	~~212.5~~	5	382.5
5	Santiago Martínez (ESP)	B	91.15	160.0	170.0	~~172.5~~	7	190.0	200.0	205.0	6	375.0
6	Sándor Diószegi (HUN)	A	93.10	~~165.0~~	165.0	170.0	8	202.5	~~207.5~~	~~207.5~~	9	372.5
7	Talat Bayam (TUR)	A	93.75	~~172.5~~	172.5	~~177.5~~	5	200.0	~~210.0~~	~~210.0~~	10	372.5
8	Konstantinos Papadopoulos (GRE)	A	92.90	160.0	165.0	~~170.0~~	9	200.0	205.0	~~210.0~~	7	370.0
9	Valeri Pokryvchak (UKR)	A	93.10	~~165.0~~	165.0	~~170.0~~	11	205.0	~~210.0~~	~~210.0~~	8	370.0
10	Pavel Harkavy (BLR)	B	93.80	167.5	172.5	~~177.5~~	6	187.5	192.5	195.0	12	367.5
11	Bartłomiej Bonk (POL)	A	92.35	155.0	160.0	162.5	12	195.0	~~200.0~~	~~200.0~~	11	357.5
12	Marco Di Marzio (ITA)	B	90.70	150.0	155.0	~~157.5~~	13	~~180.0~~	~~180.0~~	180.0	15	335.0
13	Paul Supple (GBR)	B	93.25	147.5	~~152.5~~	152.5	14	177.5	182.5	~~185.0~~	14	335.0
14	Adem Kala (NED)	B	92.35	~~145.0~~	145.0	~~152.5~~	18	180.0	185.0	~~190.0~~	13	330.0
15	Shigeharu Yamamoto (JPN)	B	91.95	145.0	150.0	~~152.5~~	15	172.5	177.5	~~182.5~~	17	327.5
16	Ismael Alonso (ESP)	B	92.20	140.0	145.0	~~150.0~~	17	~~180.0~~	180.0	~~185.0~~	16	325.0
—	Alibay Samadov (AZE)	A	93.05	160.0	165.0	~~170.0~~	10	—	—	—	—	—
—	Sergejs Lazovskis (LAT)	B	93.15	150.0	~~155.0~~	~~155.0~~	16	~~195.0~~	~~195.0~~	~~195.0~~	—	—
—	Kourosh Bagheri (IRI)	A	93.35	~~177.5~~	~~177.5~~	~~180.0~~	—	210.0	~~215.0~~	~~217.5~~	3rd place, bronze medalist(s)	—
—	Benjamin Pirkkiö (FIN)	B	93.85	~~152.5~~	~~152.5~~	~~152.5~~	—	—	—	—	—	—
