= 1999 World Weightlifting Championships – Men's 94 kg =

The Men's Middle-Heavyweight Weightlifting Event (94 kg) is the sixth men's weight class event at the weightlifting competition, limited to competitors with a maximum of 94 kilograms of body mass. The competition at the 1999 World Weightlifting Championships took place on 1999-11-27 in Athens, Greece.

Each lifter performed in both the snatch and clean and jerk lifts, with the final score being the sum of the lifter's best result in each. The athlete received three attempts in each of the two lifts; the score for the lift was the heaviest weight successfully lifted.

== Medalists ==
Event	Gold		Silver		Bronze	
Snatch	Akakios Kakiasvilis (GRE)	187.5 kg	Leonidas Kokas (GRE)	185.0 kg	Hakob Pilosyan (ARM)	182.5 kg
Clean & Jerk	Akakios Kakiasvilis (GRE)	225.0 kg	Szymon Kołecki (POL)	225.0 kg	Bünyamin Sudaş (TUR)	220.0 kg
Total	Akakios Kakiasvilis (GRE)	412.5 kg	Szymon Kołecki (POL)	405.0 kg	Leonidas Kokas (GRE)	402.5 kg

== Records ==
Prior to this competition, the existing world records were as follows.

World Record	Snatch	World Standard	187.5 kg	—	1 January 1998
World Record	Clean & Jerk	World Standard	230.0 kg	—	1 January 1998
World Record	Total	World Standard	417.5 kg	—	1 January 1998

== Results ==
Rank	Athlete	Body weight	Snatch (kg)				Clean & Jerk (kg)				Total
Rank	Athlete	Body weight	1	2	3	Rank	1	2	3	Rank	Total
1st place, gold medalist(s)	Akakios Kakiasvilis (GRE)	92.96	180.0	185.0	188.0	1st place, gold medalist(s)	222.5	225.0	~~230.5~~	1st place, gold medalist(s)	412.5
2nd place, silver medalist(s)	Szymon Kołecki (POL)	93.39	175.0	180.0	~~182.5~~	4	222.5	225.0	~~235.0~~	2nd place, silver medalist(s)	405.0
3rd place, bronze medalist(s)	Leonidas Kokas (GRE)	92.60	177.5	182.5	185.0	2nd place, silver medalist(s)	~~217.5~~	217.5	~~222.5~~	6	402.5
4	Bünyamin Sudaş (TUR)	93.12	175.0	~~180.0~~	~~180.0~~	9	215.0	220.0	~~225.0~~	3rd place, bronze medalist(s)	395.0
5	Aleksey Petrov (RUS)	93.79	170.0	175.0	—	12	210.0	217.5	220.0	5	395.0
6	Alan Tsagaev (BUL)	93.78	167.5	172.5	~~177.5~~	14	207.5	220.0	~~227.5~~	4	392.5
7	Hakob Pilosyan (ARM)	93.85	175.0	~~180.0~~	182.5	3rd place, bronze medalist(s)	202.5	210.0	~~222.5~~	12	392.5
8	Oleh Chumak (UKR)	93.15	172.5	~~177.5~~	~~177.5~~	13	210.0	217.5	~~220.0~~	7	390.0
9	Kourosh Bagheri (IRI)	93.75	175.0	~~180.0~~	180.0	5	210.0	~~217.5~~	~~217.5~~	11	390.0
10	Zoltán Kovács (HUN)	93.77	~~175.0~~	~~175.0~~	175.0	11	~~210.0~~	210.0	215.0	8	390.0
11	Lars Betker (GER)	93.21	165.0	170.0	175.0	10	205.0	210.0	~~215.0~~	10	385.0
12	Tadeusz Drzazga (POL)	93.04	172.5	177.5	~~180.0~~	7	202.5	~~210.0~~	~~210.0~~	20	380.0
13	Carlos Hernández (CUB)	93.10	~~170.0~~	170.0	~~177.5~~	16	205.0	~~210.0~~	210.0	9	380.0
14	Andrey Makarov (KAZ)	91.62	170.0	177.5	~~182.5~~	6	195.0	200.0	~~205.0~~	22	377.5
15	Pavel Bazuk (BLR)	91.71	162.5	170.0	175.0	8	192.5	202.5	~~207.5~~	18	377.5
16	Michel Batista (CUB)	93.82	~~170.0~~	170.0	~~180.0~~	17	205.0	~~210.0~~	~~210.0~~	17	375.0
17	Aleksandr Neshai (BLR)	93.85	~~162.5~~	162.5	170.0	18	192.5	202.5	~~210.0~~	21	372.5
18	Slavik Nyu (KAZ)	91.91	170.0	~~180.0~~	~~180.0~~	15	190.0	200.0	~~205.0~~	23	370.0
19	Maksim Agapitov (RUS)	92.94	~~167.5~~	167.5	~~172.5~~	19	~~202.5~~	~~202.5~~	202.5	19	370.0
20	Chun Yong-sung (KOR)	93.72	~~157.5~~	157.5	162.5	22	202.5	207.5	~~212.5~~	14	370.0
21	Tom Gough (USA)	93.50	155.0	160.0	162.5	21	197.5	205.0	~~210.0~~	15	367.5
22	Almaz Askeev (KGZ)	93.71	160.0	165.0	167.5	20	195.0	200.0	~~205.0~~	24	367.5
23	Sergejs Lazovskis (LAT)	93.52	155.0	~~160.0~~	160.0	27	200.0	205.0	~~210.0~~	16	365.0
24	Fazilbek Urazimbetov (UZB)	92.55	155.0	~~160.0~~	~~160.0~~	32	202.5	207.5	~~210.0~~	13	362.5
25	Alphonse Matam (FRA)	93.07	152.5	157.5	160.0	25	185.0	190.0	195.0	25	355.0
26	Roman Hlad (SVK)	93.56	150.0	155.0	160.0	28	185.0	192.5	~~195.0~~	26	352.5
27	Ahmed Mustafa (EGY)	93.98	152.5	157.5	~~160.0~~	29	~~190.0~~	190.0	~~195.0~~	29	347.5
28	Peter Kelley (USA)	93.85	150.0	~~155.0~~	155.0	33	185.0	190.0	~~192.5~~	28	345.0
29	Jairo Cossio (COL)	88.58	150.0	155.0	~~160.0~~	30	185.0	~~190.0~~	~~190.0~~	32	340.0
30	Arūnas Smelstorius (LTU)	88.93	~~160.0~~	~~160.0~~	160.0	23	180.0	~~187.5~~	—	34	340.0
31	Harvey Goodman (AUS)	92.51	150.0	~~155.0~~	~~155.0~~	38	190.0	~~195.0~~	~~195.0~~	27	340.0
32	Fadel Mohamed Yousif (QAT)	93.30	~~150.0~~	150.0	152.5	36	187.5	—	—	30	340.0
33	Khajik Khajoyan (SYR)	92.48	~~150.0~~	150.0	~~155.0~~	37	~~185.0~~	~~185.0~~	185.0	33	335.0
34	Andrew Callard (GBR)	93.58	142.5	147.5	~~150.0~~	40	182.5	187.5	~~192.5~~	31	335.0
35	Jaroslav Jokeľ (SVK)	93.85	150.0	155.0	~~160.0~~	34	~~180.0~~	180.0	~~187.5~~	38	335.0
36	Denis François (FRA)	92.86	147.5	~~152.5~~	~~152.5~~	39	180.0	~~185.0~~	~~185.0~~	35	327.5
37	Sacha Amédé (CAN)	93.95	145.0	150.0	155.0	35	172.5	~~177.5~~	~~180.0~~	45	327.5
38	Artur Lagja (ALB)	93.12	~~140.0~~	140.0	~~145.0~~	44	175.0	180.0	~~182.5~~	37	320.0
39	Wang Kuo-chen (TPE)	93.96	~~137.5~~	137.5	~~142.5~~	45	175.0	~~180.0~~	180.0	40	317.5
40	Sergio Britva (ISR)	87.20	135.0	~~142.5~~	142.5	41	165.0	170.0	~~172.5~~	46	312.5
41	Anthony Arthur (GBR)	91.44	150.0	155.0	—	31	155.0	—	—	52	310.0
42	Peter Banke (DEN)	92.22	130.0	135.0	~~137.5~~	46	175.0	~~180.0~~	~~180.0~~	42	310.0
43	Guy Martineau (CAN)	93.22	135.0	~~140.0~~	~~140.0~~	47	170.0	~~175.0~~	175.0	43	310.0
44	Odd Gunnar Røyseth (NOR)	93.40	135.0	~~140.0~~	~~140.0~~	48	175.0	~~180.0~~	~~180.0~~	44	310.0
45	Carlos Holguín (DOM)	93.44	142.5	~~147.5~~	~~150.0~~	42	165.0	~~170.0~~	~~170.0~~	49	307.5
46	Henrik Herr (DEN)	93.40	130.0	~~135.0~~	135.0	49	160.0	165.0	167.5	48	302.5
47	Janos Nemeshazy (SUI)	93.21	~~130.0~~	~~130.0~~	130.0	50	~~160.0~~	160.0	~~162.5~~	50	290.0
48	Thierry Huguenin (SUI)	87.77	122.5	~~127.5~~	~~127.5~~	51	152.5	157.5	~~160.0~~	51	280.0
—	Mihai Vihodet (MDA)	92.63	155.0	160.0	~~162.5~~	24	~~180.0~~	~~180.0~~	~~180.0~~	—	—
—	Jürgen Matzku (AUT)	93.27	155.0	160.0	~~165.0~~	26	—	—	—	—	—
—	Saleh Mohammed (IRQ)	92.83	~~140.0~~	140.0	~~145.0~~	43	—	—	—	—	—
—	Rodin Thoma (NRU)	93.12	~~140.0~~	~~140.0~~	~~140.0~~	—	180.0	~~187.5~~	~~187.5~~	36	—
—	Gunnar Løgdahl (SWE)	93.87	~~145.0~~	~~145.0~~	~~145.0~~	—	175.0	~~180.0~~	180.0	39	—
—	Elion Ago (ALB)	87.28	~~152.5~~	~~152.5~~	~~152.5~~	—	175.0	—	—	41	—
—	Abdulsalam Wershefani (LBA)	91.51	~~125.0~~	~~130.0~~	—	—	170.0	~~175.0~~	~~175.0~~	47	—
—	Vitor Graça (POR)	93.48	~~140.0~~	~~140.0~~	~~140.0~~	—	~~167.5~~	—	—	—	—
—	Kiril Kounev (AUS)	93.49	~~165.0~~	~~165.0~~	—	—	—	—	—	—	—
—	Darío Lecman (ARG)	93.82	~~170.0~~	~~170.0~~	~~170.0~~	—	—	—	—	—	—
—	Benjamin Pirkkiö (FIN)	93.83	~~155.0~~	~~155.0~~	~~155.0~~	—	—	—	—	—	—
DQ	Diego Facca (ITA)	93.37	150.0	~~155.0~~	~~155.0~~	—	~~192.5~~	~~195.0~~	195.0	—	—

== New records ==
Snatch	188.0 kg	Akakios Kakiasvilis (GRE)	WR
