= 1998 World Weightlifting Championships – Men's 94 kg =

The 1998 World Weightlifting Championships were held in Lahti, Finland from November 7 to November 15. The men's competition in the middle-heavyweight (94 kg) division was staged on 14 November 1998.

== Medalists ==
Event	Gold		Silver		Bronze	
Snatch	Oliver Caruso (GER)	182.5 kg	Tadeusz Drzazga (POL)	180.0 kg	Akakios Kakiasvilis (GRE)	180.0 kg
Clean & Jerk	Akakios Kakiasvilis (GRE)	220.0 kg	Leonidas Kokas (GRE)	217.5 kg	Szymon Kołecki (POL)	217.5 kg
Total	Akakios Kakiasvilis (GRE)	400.0 kg	Oliver Caruso (GER)	395.0 kg	Leonidas Kokas (GRE)	392.5 kg

== Records ==
Prior to this competition, the existing world records were as follows.

World record	Snatch	World Standard	187.5 kg	—	1 January 1998
World record	Clean & jerk	World Standard	230.0 kg	—	1 January 1998
World record	Total	World Standard	417.5 kg	—	1 January 1998

== Results ==
Rank	Athlete	Body weight	Snatch (kg)				Clean & Jerk (kg)				Total
Rank	Athlete	Body weight	1	2	3	Rank	1	2	3	Rank	Total
1st place, gold medalist(s)	Akakios Kakiasvilis (GRE)	93.62	175.0	180.0	~~182.5~~	3rd place, bronze medalist(s)	215.0	220.0	—	1st place, gold medalist(s)	400.0
2nd place, silver medalist(s)	Oliver Caruso (GER)	93.63	175.0	~~182.5~~	182.5	1st place, gold medalist(s)	205.0	212.5	—	5	395.0
3rd place, bronze medalist(s)	Leonidas Kokas (GRE)	92.38	170.0	~~175.0~~	175.0	4	210.0	215.0	217.5	2nd place, silver medalist(s)	392.5
4	Tadeusz Drzazga (POL)	93.06	175.0	~~180.0~~	180.0	2nd place, silver medalist(s)	210.0	~~215.0~~	~~215.0~~	7	390.0
5	Szymon Kołecki (POL)	93.95	160.0	165.0	167.5	12	205.0	212.5	218.0	3rd place, bronze medalist(s)	385.0
6	Bünyamin Sudaş (TUR)	92.95	165.0	170.0	~~175.0~~	9	200.0	207.5	210.0	6	380.0
7	Julio Luna (VEN)	92.78	160.0	~~165.0~~	~~165.0~~	15	202.0	~~215.0~~	215.0	4	375.0
8	Hakob Pilosyan (ARM)	93.37	170.0	175.0	~~180.0~~	5	200.0	~~210.0~~	~~212.5~~	11	375.0
9	Mikhail Khomiakov (RUS)	93.50	167.5	~~172.5~~	~~172.5~~	11	200.0	205.0	~~210.0~~	8	372.5
10	Stanislav Rybalchenko (UKR)	93.83	172.5	~~177.5~~	~~177.5~~	8	~~200.0~~	200.0	~~210.0~~	12	372.5
11	Pavel Bazuk (BLR)	90.55	160.0	165.0	~~170.0~~	13	197.5	~~202.5~~	202.5	9	367.5
12	Lars Betker (GER)	92.98	155.0	160.0	162.5	14	190.0	195.0	200.0	10	362.5
13	Sergejs Lazovskis (LAT)	93.61	150.0	~~155.0~~	155.0	16	~~192.5~~	192.5	~~202.5~~	13	347.5
14	Rafig Aliyev (KAZ)	91.78	145.0	152.5	~~157.5~~	17	180.0	190.0	~~195.0~~	15	342.5
15	Jakob Asp (DEN)	93.70	142.5	147.5	150.0	20	185.0	~~192.5~~	192.5	14	342.5
16	Markku Nykänen (FIN)	93.90	147.5	150.0	152.5	18	182.5	~~187.5~~	~~187.5~~	19	335.0
17	Sami Järvinen (FIN)	93.67	~~142.5~~	142.5	147.5	21	177.5	~~182.5~~	182.5	18	330.0
18	Chiu Yen-chun (TPE)	88.54	135.0	142.5	145.0	22	175.0	182.5	~~187.5~~	16	327.5
19	Simon Heffernan (AUS)	91.57	~~130.0~~	130.0	137.5	26	170.0	177.5	182.5	17	320.0
20	Andrew Callard (GBR)	93.49	140.0	~~145.0~~	~~145.0~~	25	175.0	180.0	—	21	320.0
21	Phillip Christou (AUS)	89.33	135.0	~~140.0~~	140.0	24	170.0	~~175.0~~	175.0	22	315.0
22	Rodin Thoma (NRU)	93.14	130.0	135.0	~~140.0~~	29	170.0	~~180.0~~	180.0	20	315.0
23	Sacha Amédé (CAN)	93.02	142.5	~~150.0~~	~~152.5~~	23	165.0	~~170.0~~	~~175.0~~	24	307.5
24	Gaston Fodouor (CMR)	92.58	~~130.0~~	~~130.0~~	135.0	27	160.0	~~170.0~~	—	25	295.0
25	Božo Krišto (CRO)	92.67	~~130.0~~	130.0	~~137.5~~	30	~~165.0~~	165.0	~~172.5~~	23	295.0
26	Norvell Busby (NED)	85.82	115.0	120.0	~~125.0~~	31	142.5	147.5	150.0	26	270.0
27	David Daly (IRL)	93.23	110.0	117.5	~~120.0~~	32	140.0	150.0	~~155.0~~	27	267.5
—	Adrian Mateaș (ROM)	93.53	175.0	~~180.0~~	~~182.5~~	6	~~205.0~~	~~205.0~~	~~205.0~~	—	—
—	Oleksiy Sukhov (UKR)	93.76	162.5	167.5	172.5	7	~~195.0~~	~~195.0~~	~~195.0~~	—	—
—	Zoltán Kovács (HUN)	92.96	165.0	170.0	~~172.5~~	10	~~210.0~~	~~210.0~~	~~210.0~~	—	—
—	Peter May (GBR)	92.91	~~150.0~~	~~150.0~~	150.0	19	~~185.0~~	~~185.0~~	~~187.5~~	—	—
—	Odd Gunnar Røyseth (NOR)	93.01	~~135.0~~	135.0	~~140.0~~	28	~~175.0~~	~~175.0~~	~~175.0~~	—	—
—	Sergio Britva (ISR)	92.27	~~132.5~~	~~132.5~~	~~132.5~~	—	~~160.0~~	~~160.0~~	—	—	—
—	Boris Burov (ECU)	93.99	~~165.0~~	~~165.0~~	~~165.0~~	—	—	—	—	—	—
