= 2001 World Weightlifting Championships – Men's 94 kg =

The 2001 World Weightlifting Championships were held in Antalya, Turkey from November 4 to November 11. The men's competition in the middle heavyweight (94 kg) division was staged on 9 November 2001.

== Medalists ==
| Event | Gold | | Silver | | Bronze | |
|---|---|---|---|---|---|---|
| Snatch | Kourosh Bagheri (IRI) | 185.0 kg | Nizami Pashayev (AZE) | 182.5 kg | Aleksander Karapetyan (AUS) | 182.5 kg |
| Clean & Jerk | Szymon Kołecki (POL) | 230.0 kg | Nizami Pashayev (AZE) | 222.5 kg | Kourosh Bagheri (IRI) | 222.5 kg |
| Total | Kourosh Bagheri (IRI) | 407.5 kg | Nizami Pashayev (AZE) | 405.0 kg | Szymon Kołecki (POL) | 402.5 kg |

== Records ==
Prior to this competition, the existing world records were as follows.

| World record | Snatch | Akakios Kakiasvilis (GRE) | 188.0 kg | Athens, Greece | 27 November 1999 |
| World record | Clean & Jerk | Szymon Kołecki (POL) | 232.5 kg | Sofia, Bulgaria | 29 April 2000 |
| World record | Total | World Standard | 417.5 kg | — | 1 January 1998 |

== Results ==
| Rank | Athlete | Body weight | Snatch (kg) | | | | Clean & Jerk (kg) | | | | Total |
| Rank | Athlete | Body weight | 1 | 2 | 3 | Rank | 1 | 2 | 3 | Rank | Total |
|---|---|---|---|---|---|---|---|---|---|---|---|
| 1st place, gold medalist(s) | Kourosh Bagheri (IRI) | 93.60 | ~~185.0~~ | ~~185.0~~ | 185.0 | 1st place, gold medalist(s) | 215.0 | 220.0 | 222.5 | 3rd place, bronze medalist(s) | 407.5 |
| 2nd place, silver medalist(s) | Nizami Pashayev (AZE) | 92.90 | 177.5 | ~~182.5~~ | 182.5 | 2nd place, silver medalist(s) | 212.5 | 217.5 | 222.5 | 2nd place, silver medalist(s) | 405.0 |
| 3rd place, bronze medalist(s) | Szymon Kołecki (POL) | 93.74 | 172.5 | ~~177.5~~ | ~~177.5~~ | 9 | 220.0 | 230.0 | ~~237.5~~ | 1st place, gold medalist(s) | 402.5 |
| 4 | Nikolay Stoyanov (BUL) | 93.36 | ~~175.0~~ | 175.0 | ~~177.5~~ | 7 | 210.0 | ~~217.5~~ | 217.5 | 5 | 392.5 |
| 5 | Aleksander Karapetyan (AUS) | 93.90 | 177.5 | 182.5 | ~~185.0~~ | 3rd place, bronze medalist(s) | ~~210.0~~ | ~~210.0~~ | 210.0 | 7 | 392.5 |
| 6 | Leonidas Kokas (GRE) | 93.14 | ~~175.0~~ | 177.5 | ~~182.5~~ | 4 | 212.5 | ~~220.0~~ | ~~220.0~~ | 6 | 390.0 |
| 7 | Vadim Vacarciuc (MDA) | 93.30 | 170.0 | ~~175.0~~ | ~~175.0~~ | 10 | ~~212.5~~ | 212.5 | 217.5 | 4 | 387.5 |
| 8 | Oliver Caruso (GER) | 93.60 | 170.0 | 177.5 | ~~182.5~~ | 5 | 192.5 | 200.0 | ~~207.5~~ | 11 | 377.5 |
| 9 | Talat Bayam (TUR) | 93.62 | 165.0 | 170.0 | 172.5 | 8 | 200.0 | 205.0 | ~~207.5~~ | 10 | 377.5 |
| 10 | Eugen Bratan (MDA) | 93.34 | 165.0 | ~~170.0~~ | 170.0 | 11 | 205.0 | ~~210.0~~ | ~~210.0~~ | 8 | 375.0 |
| 11 | Santiago Martínez (ESP) | 91.90 | 160.0 | 165.0 | 167.5 | 12 | 190.0 | 195.0 | ~~197.5~~ | 12 | 362.5 |
| 12 | Andrus Utsar (EST) | 92.18 | ~~162.5~~ | 162.5 | 167.5 | 13 | 190.0 | ~~195.0~~ | ~~195.0~~ | 14 | 357.5 |
| 13 | Peter May (GBR) | 93.78 | 155.0 | 160.0 | ~~162.5~~ | 14 | 185.0 | ~~190.0~~ | 190.0 | 15 | 350.0 |
| 14 | Benjamin Pirkkiö (FIN) | 93.80 | ~~155.0~~ | 155.0 | ~~160.0~~ | 17 | 190.0 | ~~197.5~~ | — | 16 | 345.0 |
| 15 | William Solís (COL) | 91.16 | 145.0 | 150.0 | ~~152.5~~ | 19 | 185.0 | ~~190.0~~ | 190.0 | 13 | 340.0 |
| 16 | Tofik Heydarov (AZE) | 93.78 | 150.0 | ~~155.0~~ | 160.0 | 15 | 180.0 | ~~190.0~~ | ~~190.0~~ | 19 | 340.0 |
| 17 | Sacha Amédé (CAN) | 93.60 | 145.0 | 150.0 | 152.5 | 18 | 172.5 | ~~177.5~~ | 180.0 | 18 | 332.5 |
| 18 | Sukhinder Singh (IND) | 91.88 | 140.0 | 147.5 | ~~152.5~~ | 20 | 175.0 | 180.0 | ~~182.5~~ | 17 | 327.5 |
| — | György Ehrlich (HUN) | 90.04 | 170.0 | 175.0 | ~~177.5~~ | 6 | ~~195.0~~ | ~~195.0~~ | ~~195.0~~ | — | — |
| — | Toni Puurunen (FIN) | 92.04 | 155.0 | ~~160.0~~ | ~~160.0~~ | 16 | — | — | — | — | — |
| — | Sándor Diószegi (HUN) | 93.40 | ~~162.5~~ | ~~162.5~~ | ~~162.5~~ | — | 195.0 | 200.0 | 205.0 | 9 | — |
| DQ | Hakob Pilosyan (ARM) | 93.74 | 175.0 | 180.0 | 182.5 | — | 212.5 | 217.5 | ~~222.5~~ | — | — |
