= 2009 World Weightlifting Championships – Men's 94 kg =

The men's competition in the middle-heavyweight (– 94 kg) division was staged on November 26 and 27, 2009.

== Schedule ==
Date	Time	Event
26 November 2009	09:00	Group C
27 November 2009	13:00	Group B
27 November 2009	19:00	Group A

== Medalists ==
Event	Gold		Silver		Bronze	
Snatch	Artem Ivanov (UKR)	180 kg	Kim Min-jae (KOR)	178 kg	Asghar Ebrahimi (IRI)	176 kg
Clean & Jerk	Kim Seon-jong (KOR)	218 kg	Valeriu Calancea (ROU)	211 kg	Anatolie Cîrîcu (MDA)	210 kg
Total	Kim Min-jae (KOR)	384 kg	Kim Seon-jong (KOR)	383 kg	Andrey Demanov (RUS)	381 kg

== Records ==
Prior to this competition, the existing world records were as follows.

World record	Snatch	Akakios Kakiasvilis (GRE)	188 kg	Athens, Greece	27 November 1999
World record	Clean & Jerk	Szymon Kołecki (POL)	232 kg	Sofia, Bulgaria	29 April 2000
World record	Total	Akakios Kakiasvilis (GRE)	412 kg	Athens, Greece	27 November 1999

== Results ==
Rank	Athlete	Group	Body weight	Snatch (kg)				Clean & Jerk (kg)				Total
Rank	Athlete	Group	Body weight	1	2	3	Rank	1	2	3	Rank	Total
1st place, gold medalist(s)	Kim Min-jae (KOR)	A	93.86	~~175~~	175	178	2nd place, silver medalist(s)	~~205~~	205	206	6	384
2nd place, silver medalist(s)	Kim Seon-jong (KOR)	A	92.89	160	165	~~168~~	11	211	218	~~226~~	1st place, gold medalist(s)	383
3rd place, bronze medalist(s)	Andrey Demanov (RUS)	A	93.72	171	~~176~~	~~176~~	6	~~210~~	~~210~~	210	5	381
4	Rovshan Fatullayev (AZE)	B	92.99	165	170	~~175~~	8	~~210~~	~~210~~	210	4	380
5	Artem Ivanov (UKR)	B	93.64	175	180	~~184~~	1st place, gold medalist(s)	200	~~205~~	~~205~~	11	380
6	Eugen Bratan (MDA)	A	93.90	170	174	~~176~~	4	203	~~207~~	~~207~~	8	377
7	Asghar Ebrahimi (IRI)	B	93.63	176	~~181~~	~~182~~	3rd place, bronze medalist(s)	200	~~206~~	—	10	376
8	Bartłomiej Bonk (POL)	A	93.69	172	~~176~~	~~176~~	5	204	~~209~~	~~209~~	7	376
9	Anatolie Cîrîcu (MDA)	A	92.05	~~165~~	165	~~170~~	10	210	~~213~~	~~213~~	3rd place, bronze medalist(s)	375
10	Igor Vashanov (KAZ)	B	92.85	~~170~~	~~170~~	170	7	200	~~206~~	~~206~~	9	370
11	David Matam (FRA)	B	91.35	162	167	~~171~~	9	198	~~203~~	~~203~~	12	365
12	Ervis Tabaku (ALB)	B	92.90	165	~~169~~	~~170~~	12	~~195~~	196	~~200~~	13	361
13	Teimuraz Gogia (GEO)	B	93.64	~~160~~	160	165	13	~~192~~	~~192~~	192	16	357
14	Ruslan Ramazanow (TKM)	B	93.96	~~160~~	~~160~~	160	17	190	196	~~200~~	14	356
15	José Juan Navarro (ESP)	B	93.85	~~160~~	160	~~165~~	16	195	~~200~~	~~200~~	15	355
16	Hsieh Wei-chun (TPE)	C	93.73	150	155	161	15	~~192~~	192	~~202~~	17	353
17	Wilmer Torres (COL)	B	92.75	163	~~166~~	~~166~~	14	~~185~~	185	—	20	348
18	Salwan Jasim (IRQ)	C	92.71	145	~~150~~	150	18	180	185	190	18	340
19	Resul Elvan (TUR)	C	93.51	~~145~~	145	150	19	185	190	~~192~~	19	340
20	Dmitrijs Usovskis (LAT)	C	89.95	140	~~144~~	—	20	170	~~175~~	~~175~~	21	310
21	Abu Bakar Kabia (SLE)	C	90.12	~~120~~	120	122	22	145	150	153	22	275
22	Husam Hamada (PLE)	C	90.43	110	117	123	21	135	~~146~~	146	23	269
—	Valeriu Calancea (ROU)	A	93.42	~~170~~	~~170~~	~~172~~	—	~~211~~	211	~~218~~	2nd place, silver medalist(s)	—
DQ	Vladimir Sedov (KAZ)	A	92.23	177	182	185	—	210	217	~~225~~	—	—
DQ	Nizami Pashayev (AZE)	A	93.75	~~177~~	~~177~~	177	—	~~207~~	207	210	—	—
