= 2009 European Weightlifting Championships =

Weightlifting event in Bucharest, Romania

2009 European Championships

The 2009 European Weightlifting Championships were held in Bucharest, Romania from 3 April to 12 April 2009. It was the 88th edition of the event, which was first staged in 1896.

== Men's events ==
| Event | | Gold | | Silver | | Bronze | |
| – 56 kg | Snatch | (Belgium) Tom Goegebuer | 115 kg | (Turkey) Sedat Artuç | 110 kg | (Moldova) Igor Grabucea | 110 kg |
| – 56 kg | Clean & Jerk | (Italy) Vito Dellino | 138 kg | (Belgium) Tom Goegebuer | 137 kg | (Moldova) Igor Grabucea | 136 kg |
| – 56 kg | Total | (Belgium) Tom Goegebuer | 252 kg | (Italy) Vito Dellino | 247 kg | (Moldova) Igor Grabucea | 246 kg |
| – 62 kg | Snatch | (Turkey) Erol Bilgin | 133 kg | (Cyprus) Dimitris Minasidis | 127 kg | (Azerbaijan) Zulfugar Suleymanov | 125 kg |
| – 62 kg | Clean & Jerk | (Turkey) Erol Bilgin | 160 kg | (Azerbaijan) Zulfugar Suleymanov | 160 kg | (Cyprus) Dimitris Minasidis | 157 kg |
| – 62 kg | Total | (Turkey) Erol Bilgin | 293 kg | (Azerbaijan) Zulfugar Suleymanov | 285 kg | (Cyprus) Dimitris Minasidis | 284 kg |
| – 69 kg | Snatch | (Armenia) Arakel Mirzoyan | 151 kg | (Romania) Ninel Miculescu | 150 kg | (France) Vencelas Dabaya | 147 kg |
| – 69 kg | Clean & Jerk | (France) Vencelas Dabaya | 186 kg | (Armenia) Arakel Mirzoyan | 185 kg | (Russia) Vladislav Lukanin | 183 kg |
| – 69 kg | Total | (Armenia) Arakel Mirzoyan | 336 kg | (France) Vencelas Dabaya | 333 kg | (Russia) Vladislav Lukanin | 330 kg |
| – 77 kg | Snatch | (Russia) Dmitry Ivanenko | 156 kg | (Belarus) Mikalai Cherniak | 155 kg | (Slovakia) Victor Guman | 155 kg |
| – 77 kg | Clean & Jerk | (Albania) Erkand Qerimaj | 190 kg | (Belarus) Mikalai Cherniak | 189 kg | (Poland) Piotr Chrusciewicz | 189 kg |
| – 77 kg | Total | (Belarus) Mikalai Cherniak | 344 kg | (Albania) Erkand Qerimaj | 342 kg | (Russia) Dmitry Ivanenko | 341 kg |
| – 85 kg | Snatch | (Azerbaijan) Intigam Zairov | 168 kg | (Poland) Adrian Zielinski | 167 kg | (Belarus) Mikalai Novikau | 166 kg |
| – 85 kg | Clean & Jerk | (Russia) Alexey Yufkin | 205 kg | (France) Benjamin Hennequin | 204 kg | (Belarus) Mikalai Novikau | 201 kg |
| – 85 kg | Total | (Russia) Alexey Yufkin | 369 kg | (Azerbaijan) Intigam Zairov | 368 kg | (Belarus) Mikalai Novikau | 367 kg |
| – 94 kg | Snatch | (Ukraine) Artem Ivanov | 182 kg | (Germany) Jürgen Spieß | 178 kg | (Greece) Nikos Kourtidis | 175 kg |
| – 94 kg | Clean & Jerk | (Germany) Jürgen Spieß | 212 kg | (Greece) Nikos Kourtidis | 210 kg | (Russia) Andrey Demanov | 210 kg |
| – 94 kg | Total | (Germany) Jürgen Spieß | 390 kg | (Greece) Nikos Kourtidis | 385 kg | (Russia) Andrey Demanov | 380 kg |
| – 105 kg | Snatch | (Russia) Vladimir Smorchkov | 190 kg | (Russia) Roman Konstantinov | 183 kg | (Lithuania) Ramūnas Vyšniauskas | 182 kg |
| – 105 kg | Clean & Jerk | (Ukraine) Oleksiy Torokhtiy | 224 kg | (Lithuania) Ramūnas Vyšniauskas | 223 kg | (Russia) Vladimir Smorchkov | 221 kg |
| – 105 kg | Total | (Russia) Vladimir Smorchkov | 411 kg | (Ukraine) Oleksiy Torokhtiy | 405 kg | (Lithuania) Ramūnas Vyšniauskas | 405 kg |
| + 105 kg | Snatch | (Ukraine) Ihor Shymechko | 203 kg | (Russia) Evgeny Pisarev | 193 kg | (Germany) Almir Velagic | 190 kg |
| + 105 kg | Clean & Jerk | (Ukraine) Ihor Shymechko | 230 kg | (Poland) Grzegorz Kleszcz | 229 kg | (Germany) Almir Velagic | 228 kg |
| + 105 kg | Total | (Ukraine) Ihor Shymechko | 433 kg | (Germany) Almir Velagic | 418 kg | (Russia) Evgeny Pisarev | 418 kg |

== Women's events ==
| Event: | Gold: | Result | Silver: | Result | Bronze: | Result |
|---|---|---|---|---|---|---|
| 48 kg Report | Nurcan Taylan (DQ); Turkey | 196 (88+108) | Cristina Iovu; Moldova | 171 (75+96) | Marzena Karpińska; Poland | 170 (78+92) |
| 53 kg Report | Natalia Trotsenko; Ukraine | 192 (87+105) | Aylin Daşdelen; Turkey | 187 (82+105) | Emine Bilgin; Turkey | 186 (83+103) |
| 58 kg Report | Nastassia Novikava; Belarus | 216 (96+120) | Yuliya Kalina; Ukraine | 212 (95+117) | Romela Begaj; Albania | 207 (96+111) |
| 63 kg Report | Sibel Şimşek; Turkey | 236 (108+128) | Ruth Kasirye; Norway | 231 (107+124) | Svetlana Tsarukaeva; Russia | 231 (103+128) |
| 69 kg Report | Oxana Slivenko; Russia | 255 (115+140) | Nazik Avdalyan; Armenia | 245 (110+135) | Tatiana Matveeva; Russia | 239 (102+137) |
| 75 kg Report | Natalya Zabolotnaya; Russia | 265 (120+145) | Lydia Valentín; Spain | 252 (120+132) | Nadiya Mironyuk; Ukraine | 238 (108+130) |
| +75 kg Report | Tatiana Kashirina; Russia | 280 (125+155) | Natalia Gagarina; Russia | 253 (110+143) | Yuliya Dovhal; Ukraine | 252 (111+141) |

== Medals tables ==
Ranking by "Big" (Total result) medals

| Place | Nation | 1st place, gold medalist(s) | 2nd place, silver medalist(s) | 3rd place, bronze medalist(s) | Total |
|---|---|---|---|---|---|
| 1 | Russia | 5 | 1 | 6 | 12 |
| 2 | Turkey | 2 | 1 | 1 | 5 |
| 3 | Ukraine | 2 | 2 | 2 | 6 |
| 4 | Belarus | 2 | 0 | 1 | 3 |
| 5 | Armenia | 1 | 1 | 0 | 2 |
| 6 | Germany | 1 | 1 | 0 | 2 |
| 7 | Belgium | 1 | 0 | 0 | 1 |
| 8 | Azerbaijan | 0 | 2 | 0 | 2 |
| 9 | Albania | 0 | 1 | 1 | 2 |
| 9 | Moldova | 0 | 1 | 1 | 2 |
| 11 | France | 0 | 1 | 0 | 1 |
| 11 | Greece | 0 | 1 | 0 | 1 |
| 11 | Italy | 0 | 1 | 0 | 1 |
| 11 | Norway | 0 | 1 | 0 | 1 |
| 11 | Spain | 0 | 1 | 0 | 1 |
| 16 | Cyprus | 0 | 0 | 1 | 1 |
| 16 | Lithuania | 0 | 0 | 1 | 1 |
| 16 | Poland | 0 | 0 | 1 | 1 |
