= Mykola Avramenko =

Ukrainian weightlifter and weightlifting coach (1951–2026)

Personal information
- Born: Mykola Hryhorovych Avramenko; 18 October 1951 Lypa, Berestechkovsky District, Volyn Oblast, Ukrainian SSR, USSR (now Lutsk Raion, previously Horokhiv Raion, Ukraine)
- Died: 1 July 2026 (aged 74) Lutsk, Ukraine
- Occupation: Weightlifting coach

Sport
- Country: Ukraine
- Sport: Weightlifting

Mykola Hryhorovych Avramenko (Ukrainian: Микола Григорович Авраменкo; 18 October 1951 – 1 July 2026) was a Ukrainian weightlifter and weightlifting coach. A recipient of the Honoured Coach of Ukraine, he was known for coaching Olympic weightlifters Andriy Demchuk, Mykola Hordiychuk and Nadiya Myronyuk.

Avramenko died in Lutsk on 1 July 2026, at the age of 74.
