= Weightlifting at the 2008 Summer Olympics – Men's 94 kg =

Men's 94 kg at the Games of the XXIX Olympiad
- Venue: Beihang University Gymnasium
- Date: 17 August 2008
- Competitors: 18 from 14 nations

Medalists
| 1st place, gold medalist(s) | | Szymon Kołecki | Poland |
| 2nd place, silver medalist(s) | | Arsen Kasabiev | Georgia |
| 3rd place, bronze medalist(s) | | Yoandry Hernández | Cuba |

The men's 94 kg weightlifting event was the sixth men's event at the weightlifting competition, limiting competitors to a maximum of 94 kilograms of body mass. The whole competition took place on August 17, but was divided in two parts due to the number of competitors. Group B weightlifters competed at 10:00, and Group A, at 19:00. This event was the thirteenth weightlifting event to conclude.

Each lifter performed in both the snatch and clean and jerk lifts, with the final score being the sum of the lifter's best result in each. The athlete received three attempts in each of the two lifts; the score for the lift was the heaviest weight successfully lifted.

== Schedule ==
All times are China Standard Time (UTC+08:00)

| Date | Time | Event |
|---|---|---|
| 17 August 2008 | 15:30 | Group B |
| 17 August 2008 | 19:00 | Group A |

== Records ==
Prior to this competition, the existing world and Olympic records were as follows.

| World Record | Snatch | Akakios Kakiasvilis (GRE) | 188 kg | Athens, Greece | 27 November 1999 |
| World Record | Clean & Jerk | Szymon Kołecki (POL) | 232 kg | Sofia, Bulgaria | 29 April 2000 |
| World Record | Total | Akakios Kakiasvilis (GRE) | 412 kg | Athens, Greece | 27 November 1999 |
| Olympic Record | Snatch | Olympic Standard | 187 kg | — | 1 January 1997 |
| Olympic Record | Clean & Jerk | Olympic Standard | 227 kg | — | 1 January 1997 |
| Olympic Record | Total | Olympic Standard | 415 kg | — | 1 January 1997 |

== Results ==
| Rank | Athlete | Group | Body weight | Snatch (kg) | | | | Clean & Jerk (kg) | | | | Total |
| Rank | Athlete | Group | Body weight | 1 | 2 | 3 | Result | 1 | 2 | 3 | Result | Total |
|---|---|---|---|---|---|---|---|---|---|---|---|---|
| 1st place, gold medalist(s) | Szymon Kołecki (POL) | A | 93.73 | 174 | 177 | 179 | 179 | 217 | 224 | ~~228~~ | 224 | 403 |
| 2nd place, silver medalist(s) | Arsen Kasabiev (GEO) | A | 93.69 | 172 | 176 | ~~178~~ | 176 | 215 | 223 | ~~231~~ | 223 | 399 |
| 3rd place, bronze medalist(s) | Yoandry Hernández (CUB) | A | 92.30 | ~~172~~ | 172 | 178 | 178 | 215 | ~~220~~ | ~~220~~ | 215 | 393 |
| 4 | Asghar Ebrahimi (IRI) | A | 92.32 | 180 | ~~184~~ | ~~184~~ | 180 | ~~212~~ | 212 | ~~217~~ | 212 | 392 |
| 5 | Roman Konstantinov (RUS) | A | 93.90 | 175 | ~~179~~ | ~~179~~ | 175 | ~~212~~ | 212 | ~~222~~ | 212 | 387 |
| 6 | Jürgen Spieß (GER) | A | 93.74 | 170 | 173 | ~~175~~ | 173 | 206 | 211 | ~~214~~ | 211 | 384 |
| 7 | José Juan Navarro (ESP) | B | 93.09 | 165 | ~~170~~ | 173 | 173 | 206 | 210 | ~~212~~ | 210 | 383 |
| 8 | Artem Ivanov (UKR) | A | 93.97 | 170 | ~~175~~ | ~~175~~ | 170 | 205 | 210 | ~~214~~ | 210 | 380 |
| 9 | Vadim Vacarciuc (MDA) | B | 93.69 | ~~168~~ | 168 | ~~172~~ | 168 | ~~205~~ | 205 | ~~212~~ | 205 | 373 |
| 10 | Eugen Bratan (MDA) | B | 93.71 | 170 | ~~175~~ | ~~175~~ | 170 | 200 | ~~207~~ | ~~207~~ | 200 | 370 |
| 11 | Konstantinos Gkaripis (GRE) | B | 93.01 | 150 | ~~157~~ | 160 | 160 | 190 | 195 | 200 | 200 | 360 |
| 12 | Anastasios Triantafyllou (GRE) | B | 93.90 | 147 | 155 | ~~160~~ | 155 | 185 | 190 | 196 | 196 | 351 |
| 13 | Ravi Bhollah (MRI) | B | 93.03 | 125 | ~~130~~ | ~~130~~ | 125 | 145 | 150 | ~~157~~ | 150 | 275 |
| — | Bartłomiej Bonk (POL) | A | 93.00 | 175 | ~~180~~ | ~~180~~ | 175 | ~~211~~ | ~~211~~ | ~~212~~ | — | — |
| — | Eduardo Guadamud (ECU) | B | 93.71 | 165 | ~~170~~ | ~~170~~ | 165 | ~~206~~ | ~~206~~ | ~~206~~ | — | — |
| DQ | Ilya Ilyin (KAZ) | A | 93.64 | 175 | 180 | — | ~~180~~ | ~~223~~ | 223 | 226 | ~~226~~ | ~~406~~ |
| DQ | Khadzhimurat Akkaev (RUS) | B | 92.99 | 178 | 182 | 185 | ~~185~~ | 212 | 215 | 217 | ~~217~~ | ~~402~~ |
| DQ | Nizami Pashayev (AZE) | A | 93.83 | ~~180~~ | ~~180~~ | 181 | ~~181~~ | ~~215~~ | ~~215~~ | 215 | ~~215~~ | ~~396~~ |

- Ilya Ilyin of Kazakhstan originally won the gold medal, but he was disqualified after he tested positive for stanozolol.
- Khadzhimurat Akkaev of Russia originally won the bronze medal, but he was disqualified after he tested positive for dehydrochlormethyltestosterone.
- Nizami Pashayev of Azerbaijan originally finished fifth, but he was disqualified after he tested positive for dehydrochlormethyltestosterone, oxandrolone and stanozolol.
