= Weightlifting at the 2000 Summer Olympics – Men's 94 kg =

Weightlifting at the Olympics

Men's 94 kg at the Games of the XXVII Olympiad
- Venue: Sydney Convention and Exhibition Centre
- Date: 24 September 2000
- Competitors: 19 from 17 nations

Medalists
1st place, gold medalist(s)		Akakios Kakiasvilis	Greece
2nd place, silver medalist(s)		Szymon Kołecki	Poland
3rd place, bronze medalist(s)		Aleksey Petrov	Russia

The men's 94 kilograms weightlifting event at the 2000 Summer Olympics in Sydney, Australia took place at the Sydney Convention and Exhibition Centre on September 24.

Total score was the sum of the lifter's best result in each of the snatch and the clean and jerk, with three lifts allowed for each lift. In case of a tie, the lighter lifter won; if still tied, the lifter who took the fewest attempts to achieve the total score won. Lifters without a valid snatch score did not perform the clean and jerk.

== Schedule ==
All times are Australian Eastern Time (UTC+10:00)

Date	Time	Event
24 September 2000	14:30	Group B
24 September 2000	18:30	Group A

== Records ==
{{{caption}}}
World Record	Snatch	Akakios Kakiasvilis (GRE)	188.0 kg	Athens, Greece	27 November 1999
World Record	Clean & Jerk	Szymon Kołecki (POL)	232.5 kg	Sofia, Bulgaria	29 April 2000
World Record	Total	World Standard	417.5 kg	—	1 January 1998
Olympic Record	Snatch	Olympic Standard	187.5 kg	—	1 January 1997
Olympic Record	Clean & Jerk	Olympic Standard	227.5 kg	—	1 January 1997
Olympic Record	Total	Olympic Standard	415.0 kg	—	1 January 1997

== Results ==
Rank	Athlete	Group	Body weight	Snatch (kg)				Clean & Jerk (kg)				Total
Rank	Athlete	Group	Body weight	1	2	3	Result	1	2	3	Result	Total
1st place, gold medalist(s)	Akakios Kakiasvilis (GRE)	A	92.06	180.0	185.0	~~187.5~~	185.0	220.0	—	—	220.0	405.0
2nd place, silver medalist(s)	Szymon Kołecki (POL)	A	93.58	175.0	180.0	182.5	182.5	222.5	~~227.5~~	—	222.5	405.0
3rd place, bronze medalist(s)	Aleksey Petrov (RUS)	A	93.30	~~180.0~~	~~180.0~~	180.0	180.0	~~220.0~~	222.5	~~227.5~~	222.5	402.5
4	Kourosh Bagheri (IRI)	A	93.42	180.0	187.5	~~190.0~~	187.5	215.0	~~220.0~~	~~220.0~~	215.0	402.5
5	Vadim Vacarciuc (MDA)	A	92.66	172.5	177.5	~~180.0~~	177.5	~~220.0~~	220.0	~~225.0~~	220.0	397.5
6	Zoltán Kovács (HUN)	A	94.00	172.5	177.5	180.0	180.0	210.0	217.5	—	217.5	397.5
7	Bünyamin Sudaş (TUR)	A	93.36	~~175.0~~	~~175.0~~	177.5	177.5	215.0	~~220.0~~	~~225.0~~	215.0	392.5
8	Julio Luna (VEN)	A	93.48	170.0	175.0	177.5	177.5	215.0	~~220.0~~	~~220.0~~	215.0	392.5
9	Michel Batista (CUB)	B	93.18	170.0	175.0	~~180.0~~	175.0	~~205.0~~	205.0	210.0	210.0	385.0
10	Aleksander Karapetyan (AUS)	B	94.00	170.0	175.0	~~180.0~~	175.0	207.5	~~212.5~~	~~212.5~~	207.5	382.5
11	Andriy Demchuk (UKR)	A	93.20	~~170.0~~	170.0	~~175.0~~	170.0	207.5	~~212.5~~	~~212.5~~	207.5	377.5
12	Slavik Nyu (KAZ)	B	92.46	170.0	~~175.0~~	175.0	175.0	195.0	200.0	~~202.5~~	200.0	375.0
13	Andrey Makarov (KAZ)	B	92.82	165.0	170.0	177.5	177.5	190.0	197.5	~~202.5~~	197.5	375.0
14	Kiril Kounev (AUS)	B	93.32	165.0	170.0	~~172.5~~	170.0	205.0	~~212.5~~	~~212.5~~	205.0	375.0
15	Bakhyt Akhmetov (KGZ)	B	93.04	165.0	170.0	175.0	175.0	192.5	~~200.0~~	~~202.5~~	192.5	367.5
16	Pavel Bazuk (BLR)	B	90.34	162.5	167.5	~~170.0~~	167.5	197.5	~~202.5~~	~~202.5~~	197.5	365.0
17	Lars Betker (GER)	B	93.10	~~165.0~~	165.0	~~170.0~~	165.0	200.0	~~207.5~~	~~212.5~~	200.5	365.0
18	Sergejs Lazovskis (LAT)	B	93.22	155.0	~~160.0~~	~~160.0~~	155.0	200.0	~~205.0~~	~~205.0~~	200.0	355.0
19	Darío Lecman (ARG)	B	92.64	135.0	—	—	135.0	170.0	—	—	170.0	305.0
