= David Guest =

David Guest may refer to:

- David Guest (communist) (1911–1938), British Communist mathematician and philosopher; killed in Spanish Civil War
- David Guest (field hockey) (born 1981), Australian field hockey player
- David Guest (athlete) (born 1991), British decathlete
- Dave Guest (bodybuilder) (born 1978), British weightlifter and bodybuilder

== See also ==
- David Gest (1953–2016), American producer and UK television personality
