= Kim Min-jae (weightlifter) =

South Korean weightlifter (born 1983)

Personal information
- Full name: Kim Minjae
- Nationality: South Korea
- Born: October 13, 1983 (age 42)
- Height: 173 cm (5 ft 8 in)
- Weight: 94.00 kg (207.23 lb)

Sport
- Country: South Korea
- Sport: Weightlifting

Achievements and titles
- Personal bests: Snatch: 185 kg (2012); Clean and jerk: 210 kg (2012); Total: 395 kg (2012)
Medal record
Representing South Korea
Men's weightlifting
Olympic Games
Silver medal – second place	2012 London	94 kg
World Championships
Gold medal – first place	2009 Goyang	94 kg

Kim Min-jae (Korean: 김민재; born 13 October 1983) is a South Korean weightlifter. He competed for South Korea at the 2012 Summer Olympics. Kim originally finished eighth in the 2012 London Olympics, but retesting of samples of athletes from the 2012 Olympics discovered that six of the top seven athletes were disqualified when found to be positive for the presence of performance-enhancing drugs. Therefore Kim became the silver medallist in the 94 kg weightlifting category.
