= Božo Krišto =

Croatian weightlifter

Personal information
- Born: 18 December 1964 (age 60)
- Weight: 92.67 kg (204.3 lb)

Sport
- Country: Croatia
- Sport: Weightlifting
- Weight class: 94 kg
- Team: National team
- Updated on 4 October 2016

Božo Krišto (born 18 December 1964) is a Croatian male weightlifter, competing in the 94 kg category and representing Croatia at international competitions. He competed at world championships, most recently at the 1998 World Weightlifting Championships. In 2016 he was appointed coach of the Croatian national weightlifting team.

== Major results ==
Year	Venue	Weight	Snatch (kg)				Clean & Jerk (kg)				Total	Rank
Year	Venue	Weight	1	2	3	Rank	1	2	3	Rank	Total	Rank
World Championships
1998	Lahti, Finland	94 kg	~~130~~	130	~~137.5~~	30	~~165~~	165	~~172.5~~	23	295	25
