= Stanislav Rybalchenko =

Ukrainian weightlifter

Personal information
- Full name: Stanislav Rybalchenko
- Born: 15 July 1971 (age 55)
- Weight: 93.83 kg (206.9 lb)

Sport
- Country: Ukraine
- Sport: Weightlifting
- Weight class: 94 kg
- Club: Dynamo Luhansk, Luhansk (UKR)
- Team: National team
- Updated on 4 October 2016

Stanislav Rybalchenko (Станіслав Рибалченко, born 15 July 1971) is a Ukrainian male weightlifter, competing in the 94 kg category and representing Ukraine at international competitions. He participated at the 1996 Summer Olympics in the 99 kg event. He competed at world championships, most recently at the 1998 World Weightlifting Championships.

== Major results ==
(bronze) - 1994 World Championships Sub-Heavyweight class (395.0 kg)
(gold) - 1997 European Championships Sub-Heavyweight class (390.0 kg)

Year	Venue	Weight	Snatch (kg)				Clean & Jerk (kg)				Total	Rank
Year	Venue	Weight	1	2	3	Rank	1	2	3	Rank	Total	Rank
Summer Olympics
1996	Atlanta, United States	99 kg				—N/a				—N/a		4
World Championships
1998	Lahti, Finland	94 kg	172.5	~~177.5~~	~~177.5~~	8	~~200~~	200	~~210~~	12	372.5	10
