= Ramūnas Vyšniauskas =

Lithuanian weightlifter (born 1976)

Personal information
- Born: 23 September 1976 (age 49) Kelmė, Lithuanian SSR, Soviet Union
Medal record
Men's Weightlifting
European Championships
Silver medal – second place	2008 Lignano Sabbiadoro	– 105 kg
Bronze medal – third place	2003 Athens	– 105 kg
Bronze medal – third place	2005 Sofia	– 105 kg
Bronze medal – third place	2009 Bucharest	– 105 kg

Ramūnas Vyšniauskas (born September 23, 1976, in Kelmė) is a retired weightlifter from Lithuania. He competed in the 105 kg class.

He was also a presenter of comedy TV show Lalaila on LNK network.

== Results ==
Event	Result	Snatch	Clean and jerk	Reference
1996 Summer Olympics (91 kg class)	19th place	140 kg	175 kg	
2000 Summer Olympics	11th place	175 kg	210 kg	
2003 European Championship	9th place	175 kg	215 kg	
2004 Summer Olympics	5th place	187.5 kg	222.5 kg	
2005 European Championship	3rd place	182.5 kg	227.5 kg	
2006 European Championship	5th place	185	225	
2007 World Championship	6th place	180 kg	220 kg	
2008 European Championship	2nd place	185 kg	220 kg	
2008 Summer Olympics	did not finish due to a shoulder injury			
2009 European Championship	3rd place	182 kg	223 kg	

== Doping ==
In 1997, Vyšniauskas was disqualified for two years due to a positive doping test. In
