= Anastasios Triantafyllou =

Greek weightlifter (born 1987)

Personal information
- Nationality: Greece
- Born: 30 May 1987 (age 39) Heraklion, Crete, Greece
- Height: 1.68 m (5 ft 6 in)
- Weight: 94 kg (207 lb)

Sport
- Sport: Weightlifting
- Event: 94 kg

Anastasios Triantafyllou (Greek: Αναστάσιος Τριανταφύλλου; born May 30, 1987) is a Greek weightlifter. Triantafyllou represented Greece at the 2008 Summer Olympics in Beijing, where he competed for the men's middle-heavyweight category (94 kg), along with his compatriot Konstantinos Gkaripis. He successfully lifted 155 kg in the single-motion snatch, and hoisted 196 kg in a two-part, shoulder-to-overhead clean and jerk, for a total of 351 kg, finishing behind his compatriot Gkaripis by nine kilograms in fifteenth place.

In 2009 Triantafyllou was suspended for 2 years after he failed a drug test for methylhexanamine doping.
