= Konstantinos Gkaripis =

Greek weightlifter (born 1981)

Personal information
- Nickname: Kostas
- Nationality: Greece
- Born: 12 March 1981 (age 45) Serres, Greece
- Height: 1.72 m (5 ft 7 1/2 in)
- Weight: 94 kg (207 lb)

Sport
- Sport: Weightlifting
- Event: 94 kg

Konstantinos Gkaripis (Greek: Κωνσταντίνος Γκαρίπης; born March 12, 1981, in Serres) is a Greek weightlifter. Gkaripis represented Greece at the 2008 Summer Olympics in Beijing, where he competed for the men's middle-heavyweight category (94 kg), along with his compatriot Anastasios Triantafyllou. He successfully lifted 160 kg in the single-motion snatch, and hoisted 200 kg in a two-part, shoulder-to-overhead clean and jerk, for a total of 360 kg, finishing only in fourteenth place.
