= Andrey Makarov (weightlifter) =

Kazakhstani weightlifter

Personal information
- Full name: Andrey Makarov
- Born: 11 April 1972 (age 54) Shyrgys Qazaqstan, Kazakhstan
- Height: 176 cm (5 ft 9 in)
- Weight: 91.49 kg (201.7 lb)

Sport
- Country: Kazakhstan
- Sport: Weightlifting
- Weight class: 94 kg
- Updated on 26 September 2016

Andrey Makarov (Андрей Макаров; born 11 April 1972 in Shyrgys Qazaqstan) is a Kazakhstani male weightlifter, competing in the 94 kg category and representing Kazakhstan at international competitions. He participated at the 1996 Summer Olympics in the 91 kg event and at the 2000 Summer Olympics in the 94 kg event. He competed at world championships, most recently at the 2003 World Weightlifting Championships.

== Major results ==
(bronze) - 1995 World Championships Middle-Heavyweight class (380.0 kg)

Year	Venue	Weight	Snatch (kg)				Clean & Jerk (kg)				Total	Rank
Year	Venue	Weight	1	2	3	Rank	1	2	3	Rank	Total	Rank
Summer Olympics
1996	Atlanta, United States	91 kg				—N/a				—N/a		18
2000	Sydney, Australia	94 kg				—N/a				—N/a		13
World Championships
2003	Vancouver, Canada	94 kg	165	170	~~175~~	12	185	190	~~192.5~~	22	360	18
1999	Piraeus, Greece	94 kg	170	177.5	~~182.5~~	6	195	200	~~205~~	22	377.5	14
