= Roman Konstantinov =

Russian weightlifter (born 1983)

Personal information
- Full name: Roman Aleksandrovich; Konstantinov
- Nationality: Russia
- Born: 15 August 1983 (age 42) Belovo, Kemerovo Oblast, Russian SFSR
- Height: 1.77 m (5 ft 9 1/2 in)
- Weight: 94 kg (207 lb)

Sport
- Sport: Weightlifting
- Event: 94 kg
Medal record
Men's weightlifting
Representing Russia
World Championships
Gold medal – first place	2007 Chiang Mai	94 kg
Silver medal – second place	2009 Goyang	105 kg
Bronze medal – third place	2006 Santo Domingo	94 kg
European Championships
Silver medal – second place	2007 Strasbourg	94 kg

Roman Aleksandrovich Konstantinov (Russian: Роман Александрович Константинов; born August 15, 1983, in Belovo, Kemerovo Oblast) is a Russian weightlifter. He won the bronze medal for the 94 kg class at the 2006 World Weightlifting Championships in Santo Domingo, Dominican Republic, and eventually claimed his first ever career title at the 2007 World Weightlifting Championships in Chiang Mai, Thailand, with a total of 397 kg. He also added a silver medal to his collection from the 2007 European Weightlifting Championships in Strasbourg, France.

Konstantinov represented Russia at the 2008 Summer Olympics in Beijing, where he competed for the men's middle heavyweight category (94 kg), against several top-class weightlifters, including his teammate Khadzhimurat Akkayev, Kazakhstan's Ilya Ilin, and three-time Olympians Nizami Pashayev of Azerbaijan and Szymon Kołecki of Poland. Konstantinov placed eighth in this event, as he successfully lifted 175 kg in the single-motion snatch, and hoisted 212 kg in the two-part, shoulder-to-overhead clean and jerk, for a total of 387 kg.
