= Milen Dobrev =

Bulgarian weightlifter (1980–2015)

Personal information
- Nationality: Bulgarian
- Born: February 22, 1980 Plovdiv, Bulgaria
- Died: March 21, 2015 (aged 35) Plovdiv, Bulgaria
- Height: 1.77 m (5 ft 10 in)
- Weight: 94 kg (207 lb)

Sport
- Country: Bulgaria
- Sport: Weightlifting
- Event: –94 kg
- Club: Olimp, Plovdiv

Achievements and titles
- Personal bests: Snatch: 187.5 kg (2004); Clean & Jerk: 222.5 kg (2003); Total: 407.5 kg (2004)
Medal record
Representing Bulgaria
Men's Weightlifting
Olympic Games
Gold medal – first place	2004 Athens	–94 kg
World Championships
Gold medal – first place	2003 Vancouver	–94 kg
Silver medal – second place	2002 Warsaw	–94 kg
Bronze medal – third place	2001 Antalya	–85 kg
Bronze medal – third place	2005 Doha	–94 kg
European Championships
Gold medal – first place	2003 Loutraki	–94 kg
Gold medal – first place	2004 Kyiv	–94 kg
Silver medal – second place	2002 Antalya	–94 kg
Goodwill Games
Gold medal – first place	2001 Brisbane	–85 kg
World Junior Championships
Silver medal – second place	2000 Prague	–85 kg
European Youth Championships
Bronze medal – third place	1996 Burgas	–70 kg

Milen Atanasov Dobrev (Bulgarian: Милен Атанасов Добрев, February 22, 1980 – March 21, 2015) was a Bulgarian weightlifter.

== Early life ==
Milen Dobrev was born in the village of Zhitnitsa, Plovdiv Province, Bulgaria in 1980. Dobrev started training weightlifting in 1991 under the coach Georgi Yotovski, when he was in sixth grade at the Vasil Levski Sports School and competed for the team of Maritsa. He soon proved to be a great prospect for the future.

== Youth career ==
His first international competition on youth level was in 1996, at the European Youth Weightlifting Championships in Burgas Bulgaria, where he totalled 255 kg for the bronze medal. He also participated twice in World Youth Weightlifting Championships and was awarded a silver medal in Prague, 2000.

During his military service (1999–2000), he was part of the team of CSKA. After 2001 Dobrev transferred to the team of Maritsa-Olimp and started training under Krastyo Milev.

== Senior career ==
After the win in the 85 kg weightlifting tournament of 2001 Brisbane Goodwill Games in Australia, he established himself as prominent part of the world elite of weightlifters.

He became part of the extended men's national team on February 11, 2001, and made his debut at the European Men's Championship in Trenčín, Slovakia, winning bronze medal in the snatch, though failed to achieve a successful C&J attempt and posted a zero total. Later in 2001 he also made a debut at the 2001 World Championship in Antalya, Turkey, winning his first total bronze medal in the 85 kg category.

In 2002 he won silver medal at the European Championship in Antalya, Turkey, in the 94 kg category. Later in the same year, Dobrev also became second at the World Championship in Warsaw, Poland.

In 2003 he managed to win the gold medals both at the European Championship in Loutraki, Greece and the World Championship in Vancouver, Canada.

His undefeated run continued in 2004, when he first won the European Championship in Kiev, Ukraine in April and then in August he peaked throughout his career winning the Olympic gold in Athens 2004 Olympic games middle heavyweight class.

The following year in Doha, Qatar, he managed for bronze at the World Championships, which accounted for his last eight medal on a senior level.

Milen Dobrev collected 4 gold, 2 silver and 2 bronze medals out of 10 major senior competitions in which he took part throughout his career.

He was the first Bulgarian to win an Olympic title in weightlifting as a member of a team from Plovdiv (Maritsa-Olimp).

Milen Dobrev has been an honorary citizen of Plovdiv since 2004. On April 20, 2005, at a ceremony in the Greek Embassy in Sofia, Bulgaria, he was also named honorary citizen of Athens, Greece.

== Death ==
Milen Dobrev died of a heart attack in his home in Plovdiv in 2015 at the age of 35.

== Major results ==
Year	Venue	Weight	Snatch (kg)				Clean & Jerk (kg)				Total	Rank
Year	Venue	Weight	1	2	3	Rank	1	2	3	Rank	Total	Rank
Represented Bulgaria
Olympic Games
2004	Athens, Greece	94 kg	180	185	187.5	–	217.5	220	~~225~~	–	407.5	1st place, gold medalist(s)
World Championships
2001	Antalya, Turkey	85 kg	165	170	175	3rd place, bronze medalist(s)	195	207.5	~~212.5~~	4	382.5	3rd place, bronze medalist(s)
2002	Warsaw, Poland	94 kg	~~175~~	175	~~177.5~~	3rd place, bronze medalist(s)	212.5	~~220~~	~~220~~	2nd place, silver medalist(s)	387.5	2nd place, silver medalist(s)
2003	Vancouver, Canada	94 kg	180	185	~~187.5~~	1st place, gold medalist(s)	~~220~~	220	~~222.5~~	2nd place, silver medalist(s)	405	1st place, gold medalist(s)
2005	Doha, Qatar	94 kg	~~176~~	176	180	4	210	~~215~~	218	3rd place, bronze medalist(s)	398	3rd place, bronze medalist(s)
2006	Santo Domingo, Dominican Republic	94 kg	~~170~~	~~170~~	~~170~~	–	–	–	–	–	-	–
European Championships
2001	Trenčín, Slovakia	85 kg	162.5	167.5	170	3rd place, bronze medalist(s)	~~200~~	~~202.5~~	~~202.5~~	–	–	–
2002	Antalya, Turkey	94 kg	175	180	182.5	2nd place, silver medalist(s)	210	215	~~217.5~~	2nd place, silver medalist(s)	397.5	2nd place, silver medalist(s)
2003	Loutraki, Greece	94 kg	175	180	182.5	1st place, gold medalist(s)	215	217.50	222.5	1st place, gold medalist(s)	405	1st place, gold medalist(s)
2004	Kyiv, Ukraine	94 kg	180	182.5	185	1st place, gold medalist(s)	215	217.5	–	1st place, gold medalist(s)	402.5	1st place, gold medalist(s)
World Junior Weightlifting Championships
1998	Sofia, Bulgaria	85 kg	145	150	152.5	4	180	~~185~~	~~185~~	9	332.5	5
2000	Prague, Czech Republic	85 kg	150	157.5	~~160~~	4	192.5	197.5	200	1st place, gold medalist(s)	357.5	2nd place, silver medalist(s)
European Youth Weightlifting Championship
1996	Burgas, Bulgaria	70 kg	110	115	117.5	3rd place, bronze medalist(s)	130	135	137.5	4	255	3rd place, bronze medalist(s)
