= Nikolay Kolev (weightlifter) =

Bulgarian weightlifter

Personal information
- Nationality: Bulgarian
- Born: 24 January 1978 (age 47); Plovdiv, Bulgaria

Sport
- Sport: Weightlifting

Nikolay Kolev (born 24 January 1978) is a Bulgarian weightlifter. He competed in the men's middle heavyweight event at the 2004 Summer Olympics.
