= Furkat Saidov =

Uzbekistani weightlifter (born 1987)

Personal information
- Nationality: Uzbekistani
- Born: 1 January 1987 (age 38)

Sport
- Sport: Weightlifting

Furkat Saidov (born 1 January 1987) is an Uzbekistani weightlifter. He competed in the men's middle heavyweight event at the 2004 Summer Olympics.
