= Rodin Thoma =

Nauruan weightlifter

Personal information
- Full name: Rodin Thoma
- Born: 1 January 1979 (age 47)
- Weight: 93.12 kg (205.3 lb)

Sport
- Country: Nauru
- Sport: Weightlifting
- Weight class: 94 kg
- Team: National team
- Updated on 2 October 2016

Rodin Thoma (born 1 January 1979) is a Nauruan male weightlifter, competing in the 94 kg category and representing Nauru at international competitions. He competed at world championships, most recently at the 1999 World Weightlifting Championships.

== Major results ==
Year	Venue	Weight	Snatch (kg)				Clean & Jerk (kg)				Total	Rank
Year	Venue	Weight	1	2	3	Rank	1	2	3	Rank	Total	Rank
World Championships
1999	Piraeus, Greece	94 kg	~~140~~	~~140~~	~~140~~	---	180	~~187.5~~	~~187.5~~	36	0	---
1998	Lahti, Finland	94 kg	130	135	~~140~~	29	170	~~180~~	180	20	315	22
