= Dalas Santavy =

Canadian weightlifter (born 1972)

Personal information
- Full name: Dalas-John Santavy
- Born: 26 June 1972 (age 53)
- Weight: 91.61 kg (202.0 lb)

Sport
- Country: Canada
- Sport: Weightlifting
- Weight class: 94 kg
- Team: National team
- Updated on 11 September 2016

Dalas Santavy is a Canadian weightlifter and Head coach for the 2020 Canadian Tokyo Olympic Team. Dalas Santavy was also the coach for the 2024 Olympic Games in Paris France. He represented Canada at the 1998 Commonwealth Games in Kuala Lumpur, Malaysia, and the 2006 Commonwealth Games in Melbourne, Australia, in the weightlifting competitions. He also competed at the 2007 Pan American Games in Rio de Janeiro, Brazil. Santavy retained the Canadian Senior Weightlifting Championship title for the fifth time on June 3, 2012, at the Canadian Senior Championship in La Prairie, Quebec. His total lift at the championship was 306 kg.

== Major results ==
| Year | Venue | Weight | Snatch (kg) | | | | Clean & Jerk (kg) | | | | Total | Rank |
| Year | Venue | Weight | 1 | 2 | 3 | Rank | 1 | 2 | 3 | Rank | Total | Rank |
World Championships
| 2005 | Doha, Qatar | 94 kg | 130 | 136 | ~~139~~ | 26 | 175 | 182 | ~~185~~ | 22 | 318.0 | 23 |
