= Alibay Samadov =

Azerbaijani weightlifter

Personal information
- Full name: Alibay Samadov
- Born: 26 March 1982 (age 44) Respublika Dagestan, Russia
- Height: 167 cm (5 ft 6 in)
- Weight: 101.07 kg (222.8 lb)

Sport
- Country: Azerbaijan
- Sport: Weightlifting
- Weight class: 105 kg
- Team: National team
- Updated on 7 September 2016

Alibay Samadov (Əlibəy Səmədov, born 26 March 1982 in Respublika Dagestan) is a Russian born Azerbaijani male weightlifter, competing in the 105 kg category and representing Azerbaijan at international competitions. He participated at the 2004 Summer Olympics in the 94 kg event. He competed at world championships, most recently at the 2010 World Weightlifting Championships.

== Major results ==
Year	Venue	Weight	Snatch (kg)				Clean & Jerk (kg)				Total	Rank
Year	Venue	Weight	1	2	3	Rank	1	2	3	Rank	Total	Rank
Summer Olympics
2004	Athens, Greece	94 kg										15
World Championships
2010	Antalya, Turkey	105 kg	~~160~~	~~160~~	~~160~~	---	200	---	---	20	0	---
2009	Goyang, South Korea	105 kg	155	162	~~167~~	12	200	~~206~~	~~210~~	14	362	11
2007	Chiang Mai, Thailand	94 kg	155	159	160	22	200	203	~~206~~	14	363	18
2005	Doha, Qatar	94 kg	~~155~~	155	~~160~~	19	185	195	200	18	355.0	19
2003	Vancouver, Canada	94 kg	155	160	---	26	195	~~202.5~~	~~202.5~~	18	355	21
2002	Warsaw, Poland	94 kg	160	165	~~170~~	10	---	---	---	---	0	---
