= Bidyut Kumar Roy =

Bangladeshi Weightlifter

Personal information
- Born: 1970 or 1971 (age 54–55)
- Years active: 1988–2014

Sport
- Sport: Weightlifting
- Weight class: 105 kg

Bidyut Kumar Roy is a Bangladeshi former weightlifter. He has won 26 consecutive gold medals in different categories since his maiden appearance in the 1988 national meet. He is the recipient of 2005 Bangladesh National Sports Award in the weightlifting category. He served as the weightlifting coach for Bangladesh in the 2018 Commonwealth Games.

== Career ==
During his 27-year playing career, Roy won bronze medals in the 7th, 8th, 9th South Asian Games and won silver medals in the 2012 Commonwealth Weightlifting Championship and the 2012 South Asian Weightlifting Championship.
