= Andriy Demchuk =

Ukrainian weightlifter

Personal information
- Nationality: Ukrainian
- Born: 11 December 1974 (age 50); Rivne, Ukrainian SSR, Soviet Union

Sport
- Sport: Weightlifting

Andriy Demchuk (born 11 December 1974) is a Ukrainian weightlifter. He competed in the men's middle heavyweight event at the 2000 Summer Olympics.
