= Andrey Demanov =

Russian weightlifter (born 1985)

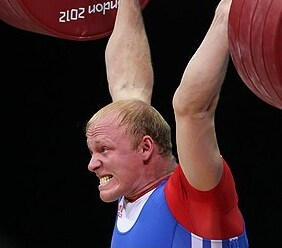
- Demanov at the 2012 Summer Olympics

Personal information
- Born: 15 July 1985 (age 41) Bolgar, Tatarstan, Soviet Union
- Weight: 105 kg (231 lb)

Sport
- Sport: Weightlifting
Medal record
Men's Weightlifting
Representing Russia
World Championships
Bronze medal – third place	2009 Goyang	– 94 kg
European Championships
Gold medal – first place	2011 Kazan	– 94 kg
Gold medal – first place	2014 Tel Aviv	– 105 kg
Silver medal – second place	2008 Lignano Sabbiadoro	– 94 kg
Bronze medal – third place	2009 Bucharest	– 94 kg
Summer Universiade
Gold medal – first place	2011 Shenzhen	-105 kg
Silver medal – second place	2013 Kazan	-105 kg

Andrey Yuriyevich Demanov (Russian: Андрей Юрьевич Деманов) (born 15 July 1985) is a Russian weightlifter. He competed for Russia at the 2012 Summer Olympics, originally finishing fourth in the men's middleheavyweight category (-94 kg).

On 21 November 2016 the IOC disqualified him from the 2012 Olympic Games and struck his results from the record for failing a drugs test in a re-analysis of his doping sample from 2012.
