= Thomas Yule =

British Weightlifter

Personal information
- Full name: Thomas Litster Yule
- Nationality: Briton
- Born: 15 March 1976 (age 50) Johannesburg, South Africa
- Height: 1.85 m (6 ft 1 in)
- Weight: 98 kg (216 lb)

Sport
- Sport: Olympic [weightlifting]
- Event(s): 94 kg and 105 kg
Medal record
Representing England
Commonwealth Games
Silver medal – second place	1998 Kuala Lumpur	105kg combined
Silver medal – second place	1998 Kuala Lumpur	105kg clean & jerk
Silver medal – second place	1998 Kuala Lumpur	105kg snatch
Representing Scotland
Men's weightlifting
Commonwealth Games
Bronze medal – third place	2006 Melbourne	94 kg

Thomas Lister Yule (born 15 March 1976) is a male former weightlifter.

== Weightlifting career ==
Born in South Africa, he represented Great Britain at the 2000 Summer Olympics in Sydney, Australia.

He represented England and won three silver medals in the 105 kg category, at the 1998 Commonwealth Games in Kuala Lumpur, Malaysia. The three medals were won during an unusual period when three medals were awarded in one category (clean and jerk, snatch and combined) which invariably led to the same athlete winning all three of the same colour medal.

Yule then twice claimed a bronze medal for Scotland at the Commonwealth Games in 2002 and 2006.

== Education ==
Yule was educated at Park House School and then St Batholomew's School in Newbury before attending Brasenose College, University of Oxford where in 1998 he received an MEng degree in Engineering Science.

== Major results ==
Year	Venue	Weight	Snatch (kg)				Clean & Jerk (kg)				Total	Rank
Year	Venue	Weight	1	2	3	Rank	1	2	3	Rank	Total	Rank
Representing Great Britain
Olympic Games
2000	Sydney, Australia	105 kg	~~155.0~~	~~155.0~~	~~155.0~~	—	—	—	—	—	—	—
World Championships
2007	Chiang Mai, Thailand	94 kg	142	~~147~~	~~147~~	38	~~170~~	~~175~~	175	36	317	35
2003	Vancouver, Canada	94 kg	~~150.0~~	~~150.0~~	~~150.0~~	—	175.0	~~185.0~~	~~190.0~~	30	—	—
1999	Athens, Greece	105 kg	155.0	160.0	165.0	24	~~195.0~~	195.0	200.0	25	365.0	24
1998	Lahti, Finland	105 kg	150.0	~~155.0~~	157.5	23	~~187.5~~	~~187.5~~	~~190.0~~	—	—	—
European Championships
2008	Lignano Sabbiadoro, Italy	94 kg	~~142~~	~~142~~	~~142~~	—	—	—	—	—	—	—
2007	Strasbourg, France	94 kg	~~144~~	~~146~~	146	16	~~177~~	177	~~181~~	16	323	16
2003	Loutraki, Greece	94 kg	~~145.0~~	150.0	~~155.0~~	14	175.0	~~185.0~~	185.0	12	335.0	12
2000	Sofia, Bulgaria	105 kg	160.0	165.0	~~167.5~~	14	192.5	197.5	~~202.5~~	13	362.5	12
1998	Riesa, Germany	105 kg	~~150.0~~	~~150.0~~	152.5	15	~~182.5~~	~~182.5~~	190.0	12	342.5	12
Representing Scotland
Commonwealth Games *
2010	Delhi, India	105 kg	~~145~~	147	~~151~~	5	~~180~~	180	~~184~~	5	327	6
2006	Melbourne, Australia	94 kg	146	151	~~153~~	2	175	~~181~~	~~181~~	6	326	(bronze)
2002	Manchester, England	94 kg	~~147.5~~	152.5	157.5	3rd place, bronze medalist(s)	~~182.5~~	~~182.5~~	~~185.0~~	—	—	—

* By 2002, medals were awarded in all three categories.
