= Eduard Tyukin =

Russian weightlifter (born 1978)

Medal record

Representing Russia

Men's weightlifting

Olympic Games
Bronze medal – third place	2004 Athens	-94 kg

Eduard Avtandilovich Tyukin (Russian: Эдуард Автандилович Тюкин) (born May 19, 1978) is a Russian weightlifter who won the bronze medal in the 94 kg class at the 2004 Summer Olympics.
