= Slavik Nyu =

Kazakhstani weightlifter

Personal information
- Nationality: Kazakhstani
- Born: 23 September 1969 (age 56) Olmazar, Uzbekistan

Sport
- Sport: Weightlifting

Slavik Nyu (Славик Валерьевич Ню, born 23 September 1969) is a Kazakhstani weightlifter. He competed in the men's middle heavyweight event at the 2000 Summer Olympics.
