= Ravi Bhollah =

Mauritian weightlifter (born 1981)

Ravi Bhollah OLY
Personal information
- Nationality: Mauritian
- Born: 28 September 1981 (age 45)
- Height: 1.80 m (5 ft 11 in)
- Weight: 94 kg (207 lb)

Sport
- Country: Mauritius
- Sport: Weightlifting Rugby
- Event: Men's 94 kg
- Coached by: Sunil Agasing (1994-1996), Serge Calotte (1997-1998), Ivan Hristov (1998-2000), Robert Balazs (2001-2003), Wilfred Vaaz (2003-2005), Marc Coret (2007), Gino Soupprayen (2007-2010), Trendafil Stoychev (2010-2011)
- Now coaching: National Coach Mauritius Weightlifting Team

Achievements and titles
- Olympic finals: 13th Place Beijing Olympics
- Regional finals: African Championships (2002, 2006 & 2008), Commonwealth Games (2002 & 2011), Indian Ocean Island Games (2007 & 2011)
- National finals: 1998-2011

Ravi Bhollah (born September 28, 1981) is a Mauritian weightlifter who competed in the men's 94 kg category at the 2008 Summer Olympics in Beijing. Bhollah placed thirteenth in his category, by lifting a snatch of 125 kg, and a clean and jerk of 150 kg, with a total of 275 kg. He currently holds the position of National Head Coach of the Mauritius Weightlifting Team. After his career as a Weightlifter in 2011, Ravi Bhollah joined the local club of Highland Blues and started playing Rugby. He played for the Mauritius National Rugby team and represented Mauritius at the Confederation African Cup in 2013, 2014, 2015 and 2016.
