= Pavel Bazuk =

Belarusian weightlifter (born 1975)

Personal information
- Nationality: Belarusian
- Born: 27 May 1975 (age 49)

Sport
- Sport: Weightlifting

Pavel Bazuk (born 27 May 1975) is a Belarusian weightlifter. He competed in the men's middle heavyweight event at the 2000 Summer Olympics.
