= Nikolaos Kourtidis =

Greek weightlifter (born 1986)

Personal information
- Nationality: Greece
- Born: 1 April 1986 (age 40)
- Height: 1.73 m (5 ft 8 in)
- Weight: 105 kg (231 lb)

Sport
- Sport: Weightlifting
- Event: 105 kg
- Club: Irakilis Kavalas

Nikolaos Kourtidis (Greek: Νικόλαος Κουρτίδης; born 1 April 1986) is a Greek weightlifter of Georgian origin. At age eighteen, Kourtidis made his official debut for the 2004 Summer Olympics in Athens, representing the host nation Greece. He successfully lifted 377.5 kg in the men's middle-heavyweight category (94 kg), finishing in eleventh place.

At the 2008 Summer Olympics in Beijing, Kourtidis competed this time for the men's heavyweight category (105 kg). He placed ninth in this event, as he successfully lifted 176 kg in the single-motion snatch, and hoisted 221 kg in a two-part, shoulder-to-overhead clean and jerk, for a total of 397 kg.

In 2009 Kourtidis failed a doping test.
