= Hakan Yılmaz =

Turkish weightlifter (born 1982)

Personal information
- Nationality: Turkish
- Born: April 1, 1982 (age 44) Sivas, Turkey
- Height: 1.77 m (5 ft 10 in)
- Weight: 94 kg (207 lb)

Sport
- Country: Turkey
- Sport: Weightlifting
- Event: 94 kg
Medal record
World Championships
| Silver medal – second place | 2003 Vancouver | –94 kg |
European Championships
| Gold medal – first place | 2005 Sofia | –94 kg |
European Junior Championships
| Gold medal – first place | 2002 Nuoro | –94 kg |

Hakan Yılmaz (born April 1, 1982 in Sivas, Turkey) is a European champion Turkish weightlifter competing in the –94 kg and 105 kg divisions. He acts also as a trainer in Eskişehir.

He competed for Turkey at the 2004 Summer Olympics, where he finished sixth in the men's 94 kg weightlifting event.

== Achievements ==
Olympics

| Rank | Discipline | Snatch | Clean&Jerk | Total | Place | Date |
|---|---|---|---|---|---|---|
| 6 | –94 kg | 175.0 | 215.0 | 390.0 | Athens, GRE | Aug 23, 2004 |

World Championships

| Rank | Discipline | Snatch | Clean&Jerk | Total | Place | Date |
|---|---|---|---|---|---|---|
| Bronze | –94 kg | | 220.0 | | Vancouver, CDN | Nov 17, 2003 |
| Silver | –94 kg | | | 400.0 | Vancouver, CDN | Nov 17, 2003 |
| Silver | –94 kg J | | 205.0 | | Havířov, CZE | May 27, 2002 |

European Weightlifting Championships

| Rank | Discipline | Snatch | Clean&Jerk | Total | Place | Date |
|---|---|---|---|---|---|---|
| Gold | –94 kg | | 215.0 | | Sofia, BUL | Apr 22, 2005 |
| Gold | –94 kg | | | 385.0 | Sofia, BUL | Apr 22, 2005 |
| Silver | –94 kg J | 165.0 | | | Nuoro, ITA | Oct 5, 2002 |
| Gold | –94 kg J | | 212.5 | | Nuoro, ITA | Oct 5, 2002 |
| Gold | –94 kg J | | | 377.5 | Nuoro, ITA | Oct 5, 2002 |
