= Dave Guest (bodybuilder) =

English bodybuilder and weightlifter

- Born: David Guest; 1 February 1978 (age 48); Bristol, England
- Other names: Dave, Monster
- Occupations: Bodybuilder, weightlifter
- Height: 5 ft 9 in (1.75 m)

David Guest (born 1 February 1978 in Bristol) is an English bodybuilder and weightlifter. He is a multiple British champion in weightlifting and a world champion in bodybuilding.

== Biography ==
"So I thought I'd try my hand at bodybuilding instead, which is a very different thing. It's not about physical strength, it's entirely about looking right. You're exercising to break the muscle down, which allows it to grow back bigger."

— Guest discussing his sports channeling modification.

Guest was born in Bristol, South West England. He has had a successful career in weightlifting. He started competing at the age of 14. He is an eight-time winner of British weightlifting championships, being awarded with gold medals in 1994−2002. He was selected to represent England at the Commonwealth Games. Being approximately 30 years old, he decided to renounce his weightlifting career, considering that its conditions negatively affect his joints. He became a bodybuilder.

Guest founds his major bodybuilding inspiration in Dorian Yates. He's a member of the National Amateur Body-Builders' Association (NABBA). In 2009 he placed first four times during two different contests: at NABBA's West Britain and England Championships he was a Class 2 (Medium-Tall) category and overall winner. In Spring 2010 he became Mr Britain; he competed in Great Britain Championships in Southport and was honoured with two gold medals, in Class 2 and overall category. The same year he participated in the world's most prestigious bodybuilding competition, Mr Universe. He placed second in Class 2 category. In 2011 Guest became an overall winner of NABBA's England Championships. He also placed first in Class 2 (Medium-Tall) category at Mr Universe.

During competition season, trying to get his body in perfect shape, Guest works out twice a day. His contest weight is approximately 254 lb (115 kg

== Competitive stats ==
- Height: 5 ft 9 in (175 cm)
- Contest weight: 254 lb (115 kg)
- Off-season weight: ~275 lb (125 kg)

== Partial bodybuilding competitions ==
- 2009: West Britain Bodybuilding Championships, NABBA, Class 2 (Medium-Tall) — 1st
- 2009: West Britain Bodybuilding Championships, NABBA, Overall — 1st
- 2009: English Midlands Bodybuilding Championships, NABBA, Overall — 4th
- 2009: England Bodybuilding Championships, NABBA, Class 2 (Medium-Tall) — 1st
- 2009: England Bodybuilding Championships, NABBA, Overall — 1st
- 2009: Great Britain Bodybuilding Championships, NABBA, Class 2 (Medium-Tall) — 2nd
- 2009: Mr. Universe, NABBA, Class 2 (Medium-Tall) — 3rd
- 2010: Great Britain Bodybuilding Championships, NABBA, Class 2 (Medium-Tall) — 1st
- 2010: Great Britain Bodybuilding Championships, NABBA, Overall — 1st
- 2010: Mr. Universe, NABBA, Class 2 (Medium-Tall) — 2nd
- 2011: England Bodybuilding Championships, NABBA, Class 2 (Medium-Tall) — 1st
- 2011: England Bodybuilding Championships, NABBA, Overall — 1st
- 2011: Mr. Universe, NABBA, Class 2 (Medium-Tall) — 1st

== Partial weightlifting competitions ==
- 1994−2002: Great Britain Championships, Men's 94 kg class — 1st
- 2002: Commonwealth Games, Men's 94 kg class — 2nd
  - snatch — 2nd
