= Aleksander Karapetyan =

Armenian weightlifter (born 1970)

Aleksan Karapetyan
Personal information
- Born: 17 August 1970 (age 55) Gyumri, Armenian SSR, Soviet Union
- Weight: 93.49 kg (206 lb)

Sport
- Country: Armenia; Australia
- Sport: Weightlifting
- Weight class: 94 kg
- Team: National team
Medal record
Men's weightlifting
Representing Armenia
World Championships
Silver medal – second place	1995 Guangzhou	-91 kg
European Championships
Bronze medal – third place	1995 Warsaw	-91 kg
Representing Australia
Commonwealth Games
Gold medal – first place	2002 Manchester	-94 kg
Gold medal – first place	2006 Melbourne	-94 kg

Aleksan Karapetyan (Armenian: Ալէքսան Կարապէտյան, born 17 August 1970 in Gyumri) is an Armenian weightlifter who later represented Australia.

Karapetyan won a silver medal at the 1995 World Weightlifting Championships for his home country Armenia. He competed at the 1996 Summer Olympics representing Armenia, coming in 13th place, and at the 2000 Summer Olympics representing Australia, coming in 10th place.

In 2007 Karapetyan was suspended for two years after he admitted benzylpiperazine doping.

== Major results ==
Year	Venue	Weight	Snatch (kg)				Clean & Jerk (kg)				Total	Rank
Year	Venue	Weight	1	2	3	Rank	1	2	3	Rank	Total	Rank
World Championships
2003	Vancouver, Canada	94 kg	~~170~~	~~170~~	~~170~~	—	—	—	—	—	—	—
2002	Warsaw, Poland	94 kg	175	~~180~~	~~180~~	4	207.5	~~212.5~~	~~212.5~~	5	382.5	4
2001	Antalya, Turkey	94 kg	177.5	182.5	~~185~~	3rd place, bronze medalist(s)	~~210~~	~~210~~	210	7	392.5	5
Commonwealth Games
2002	Manchester, England	94 kg	Lack of info	Lack of info	167.5	1st place, gold medalist(s)	Lack of info	Lack of info	197.5	1st place, gold medalist(s)	365	1st place, gold medalist(s)
2006	Melbourne, Australia	94 kg	155	160	165	1st place, gold medalist(s)	185	~~190~~	~~190~~	1st place, gold medalist(s)	350	1st place, gold medalist(s)
