= Lars Betker =

German weightlifter

Personal information
- Nationality: German
- Born: 29 September 1971 (age 53); Wriezen, East Germany

Sport
- Sport: Weightlifting

Lars Betker (born 29 September 1971) is a German former weightlifter. He competed in the men's middle heavyweight event at the 2000 Summer Olympics.
