= Najim al-Radwan =

Saudi Arabian weightlifter (1972–2018)

Personal information
- Nationality: Saudi Arabia
- Born: 22 August 1972
- Died: 15 November 2018 (aged 46)
- Height: 1.77 m (5 ft 10 in)
- Weight: 94 kg (207 lb)

Sport
- Sport: Weightlifting

Najim al-Radwan (Arabic: نجم الرضوان; 22 August 1972 – 15 November 2018) was a Saudi Arabian weightlifter. He competed in the 2004 Summer Olympics.
