= Yoandry Hernández =

Cuban weightlifter (born 1980)

Personal information
- Born: May 25, 1980 (age 46)
Medal record
Men's Weightlifting
Representing Cuba
Olympic Games
Bronze medal – third place	2008 Beijing	–94 kg
World Championships
Silver medal – second place	2007 Chiang Mai	–94 kg
Pan American Games
Gold medal – first place	2007 Rio de Janeiro	– 94 kg
Silver medal – second place	2003 Santo Domingo	– 85 kg
Pan American Championships
Gold medal – first place	2008 Callao	– 94 kg
Central American and Caribbean Games
Gold medal – first place	2006 Cartagena	– 94 kg

Yoandry Hernández Coba (born May 25, 1980, in Las Tunas) is a male weightlifter from Cuba. He won a gold medal at the 2007 Pan American Games for his native Caribbean country. Hernández represented Cuba at the 2008 Summer Olympics in Beijing, PR China.
