= Sergejs Lazovskis =

Latvian weightlifter (born 1976)

Personal information
- Nationality: Latvian
- Born: 19 April 1976 (age 49) Ludza, Latvia

Sport
- Sport: Weightlifting

Sergejs Lazovskis (born 19 April 1976) is a Latvian weightlifter. He competed in the men's middle heavyweight event at the 2000 Summer Olympics.
