= Arsen Kasabiev =

Georgian-Polish weightlifter (born 1987)

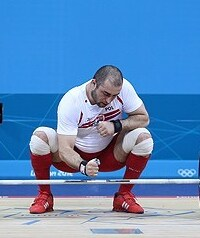
- Kasabiev in 2012 Summer Olympics

Personal information
- Nationality: Ossetian
- Born: 15 November 1987 (age 38) Tskhinvali, Georgian SSR, Soviet Union
- Height: 1.85 m (6 ft 1 in)
- Weight: 101.18 kg (223.1 lb) (2024)
Medal record
Representing Georgia
Olympic Games
Silver medal – second place	2008 Beijing	–94 kg
Representing Poland
European Championships
Gold medal – first place	2010 Minsk	–94 kg

Arsen Kasabiev (Georgian: არსენ კასაბიევი; Russian: Арсен Касабиев; born 15 November 1987 in Tskhinvali, South Ossetia) is a Polish-Georgian weightlifter of Ossetian origin. At the 2004 Summer Olympics he placed 14th. At the 2008 Summer Olympics he originally placed fourth, but due to the doping failure of Ilya Ilyin and Khadzhimurat Akkaev, he placed second. At the 2008 Summer Olympics in Beijing, PR China he initially gained attention for being from South Ossetia due to the 2008 South Ossetia war. He publicly announced that he no longer wanted to represent Georgia and moved to Poland afterwards.

He was granted Polish citizenship in December 2009; he now represents Poland.

He represented Poland at the 2012 Summer Olympics, in the event Weightlifting Men's 94 kg. He did not finish, owing to an injury.
