= Hakob Pilosyan =

Armenian weightlifter (born 1973)

Personal information
- Nationality: Armenian
- Born: 7 July 1973 (age 52) Gyumri, Armenia
Medal record
Men's weightlifting
Representing Armenia
European Championships
Bronze medal – third place	2001 Trenčín	-94 kg

Hakob Pilosyan (born 7 July 1973 in Gyumri) is an Armenian weightlifter.

Pilosyan qualified to compete at the 2000 Summer Olympics, but didn't due to illness.
