= Jürgen Spieß =

German weightlifter (born 1984)

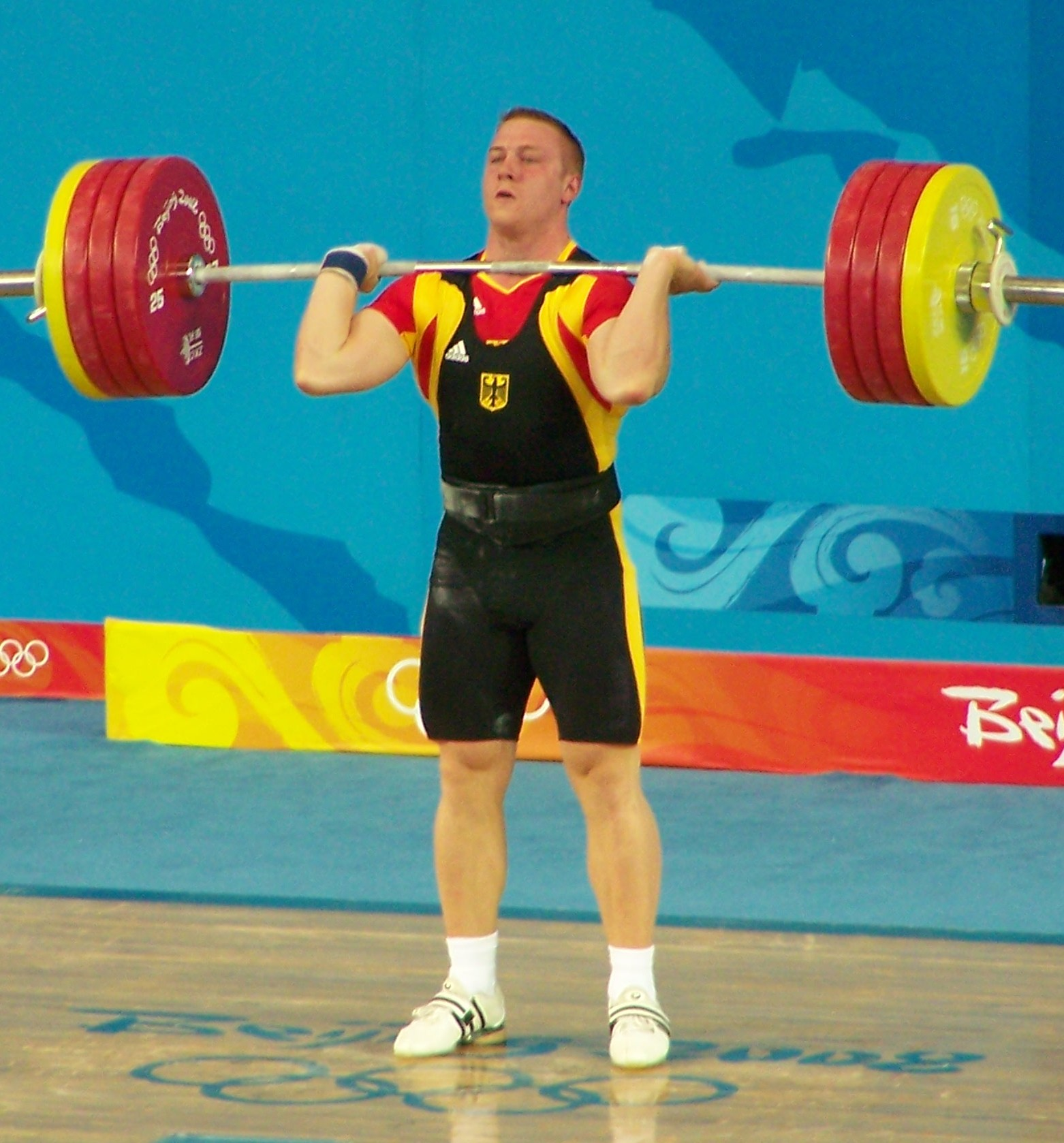
- Spieß at the 2008 Olympics

Personal information
- Born: March 26, 1984 (age 42)
- Height: 1.75 m (5 ft 9 in)
- Weight: 105 kg (231 lb)

Sport
- Country: Germany
- Sport: Weightlifting
- Event: 105 kg
Medal record
European Championships
Gold medal – first place	2009 Bucharest	94 kg

Jürgen Spieß (also spelled Spiess, born March 26, 1984, in Heidelberg, Baden-Württemberg) is a German weightlifter competing in the 94 kg category.

He competed in Weightlifting at the 2008 Summer Olympics finishing 9th with a total of 384 kg.

At the 2009 European Championships he won overall gold in the 94 kg category, with a total of 390 kg.

At the 2012 Summer Olympics, having moved up to heavyweight (105 kg), he finished 9th in that category also. At the 2016 Summer Olympics, he finished 10th in the heavyweight category.
