= José Juan Navarro =

Spanish weightlifter (born 1981)

Personal information
- Full name: José Juan Navarro Batista
- Nationality: Spain
- Born: 14 April 1981 (age 45) Arucas, Las Palmas, Spain
- Height: 1.72 m (5 ft 7 1/2 in)
- Weight: 94 kg (207 lb)

Sport
- Sport: Weightlifting
- Event: 94 kg
- Club: ESCH Arucas

José Juan Navarro Batista (born 14 April 1981 in Arucas, Las Palmas) is a Spanish weightlifter. Navarro represented Spain at the 2008 Summer Olympics in Beijing, where he competed for the men's middle heavyweight category (94 kg). Navarro placed tenth in this event, as he successfully lifted 173 kg in the single-motion snatch, and hoisted 210 kg in the two-part, shoulder-to-overhead clean and jerk, for a total of 383 kg.
