= Oliver Caruso =

German weightlifter

Personal information
- Born: 20 February 1974 (age 52) Mosbach, West Germany
Medal record
Men's Weightlifting
Representing Germany
Olympic Games
Bronze medal – third place	1996 Atlanta	91 kg
World Championships
Silver medal – second place	1998 Lahti	– 94 kg
Bronze medal – third place	2002 Warsaw	– 94 kg
European Championships
Gold medal – first place	1998 Riesa	– 94 kg
Silver medal – second place	1996 Stavanger	– 91 kg
Silver medal – second place	1997 Rijeka	– 91 kg

Oliver Caruso is a German weightlifter. He won the Bronze medal in the 91 kg in the 1996 Summer Olympics in Atlanta.
