= Santiago Martínez (weightlifter) =

Spanish weightlifter

Personal information
- Nationality: Spanish
- Born: 19 April 1979 (age 46) Girona, Spain

Sport
- Sport: Weightlifting

Santiago Martínez (born 19 April 1979) is a Spanish masters weightlifter and coach. He competed in the men's middle heavyweight event at the 2004 Summer Olympics.
