= Eugen Bratan =

Moldovan weightlifter (born 1981)

Personal information
- Nationality: Moldova
- Born: 22 May 1981 (age 45) Cahul, Moldavian SSR
- Height: 1.76 m (5 ft 9 1/2 in)
- Weight: 94 kg (207 lb)

Sport
- Sport: Weightlifting
- Event: 94 kg
Medal record
Men's weightlifting
Representing Moldova
European Championships
Bronze medal – third place	2007 Strasbourg	94 kg

Eugen Bratan (also Evgheni Bratan, born May 22, 1981, in Cahul) is a Moldovan weightlifter. He won a bronze medal for the 94 kg class at the 2007 European Weightlifting Championships in Strasbourg, France, with a total of 382 kg. He is also a brother of two-time Olympian Alexandru Bratan (2000 and 2004).

Bratan made his official debut for the 2004 Summer Olympics in Athens, where he competed in the men's middle heavyweight category class (94 kg). He finished only in tenth place by 2.5 kilograms short of his record from Spain's Santiago Martínez, with a total of 380 kg (175 in the snatch and 205 in the clean and jerk).

At the 2008 Summer Olympics in Beijing, Bratan qualified for the second time in the men's 94 kg class, after winning the bronze medal in the snatch from the 2007 World Weightlifting Championships in Chiang Mai, Thailand. Bratan placed thirteenth in this event, as he successfully lifted 170 kg in the single-motion snatch, and hoisted 200 kg in the two-part, shoulder-to-overhead clean and jerk, for a total of 370 kg.
