= Nizami Pashayev =

Azerbaijani weightlifter (born 1981)

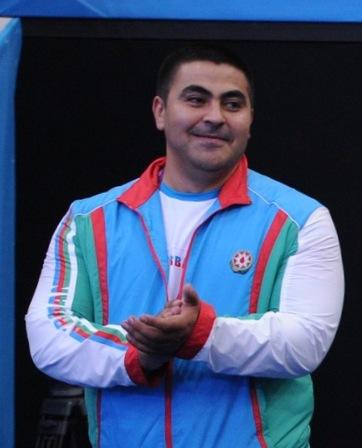

Medal record

Men's weightlifting

Representing Azerbaijan

World Championships
Gold medal – first place	2002 Warsaw	– 94 kg
Gold medal – first place	2005 Doha	– 94 kg
Disqualified	2009 Goyang	– 94 kg
Silver medal – second place	2001 Antalya	– 94 kg

European Championships
Gold medal – first place	2001 Trenčín	– 94 kg
Bronze medal – third place	2002 Antalya	– 94 kg

Islamic Solidarity Games
Bronze medal – third place	2005 Mecca	– 105 kg

Nizami Pashayev (born February 2, 1981, in Gadabay) is an Azerbaijani retired weightlifter.

== Career ==
He won two World Weightlifting Championships titles and one European Weightlifting Championships title, when he hauled 402 kilograms in total to take the overall gold in the men's 94 kg category.

Pashayev totalled 402 kg on May 20, 2006, but it was the 25-year-old's snatch winning effort of 186 kg that helped him gain the title ahead of Poland's Szymon Kolecki who was second in the clean and jerk with 217 kg. Later that year Pashayev was disqualified for two years after failing a WADA drugs test. He lost his European title and was fined $2,400.

On 17 November 2016 the IOC disqualified Pashayev from the 2008 Olympic Games and struck his results from the record for failing a drugs test in a re-analysis of his doping sample from 2008.

Olympic Games
Preceded by Namig Abdullayev	Flagbearer for Azerbaijan; Athens 2004	Succeeded by Farid Mansurov
