= Szymon Kołecki =

Polish weightlifter and mixed martial arts fighter (born 1981)

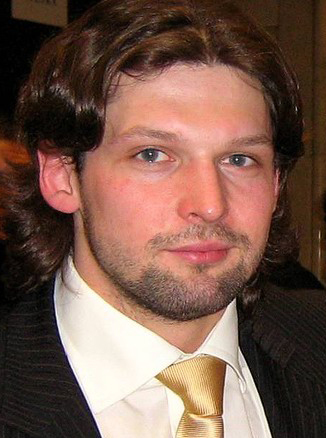
- Kołecki in 2007
- Born: Szymon Piotr Kołecki; 12 October 1981 (age 45); Oława, Poland
- Nationality: Polish
- Height: 185 cm (6 ft 1 in)
- Weight: 93 kg (205 lb)
- Division: Light Heavyweight; Heavyweight
- Fighting out of: Warsaw, Poland
- Team: Akademia Sportow Walki Wilanów
- Trainer: Mirosław Okniński (MMA); Robert Roszkiewicz (wrestling)
- Rank: Purple belt in Brazilian Jiu Jitsu
- Years active: 2017–present (MMA)

Mixed martial arts record
- Total: 16
- Wins: 14
- By knockout: 10
- By submission: 1
- By decision: 3
- Losses: 2
- By knockout: 1
- By decision: 1

Other information
- Mixed martial arts record from Sherdog
- Last updated on: 20 January 2019

Szymon Piotr Kołecki (Polish pronunciation: [ˈʂɨmɔn kɔˈwɛt͡skʲi]; born 12 October 1981) is a Polish former Olympic Champion weightlifter and current mixed martial artist. He was the silver medalist at the 2000 Olympic Games in Sydney and a gold medalist at the 2008 Olympic Games in Beijing, both in the 94 kg categories.

== Weightlifting career ==
=== Olympics ===
In 2000, he competed at the 2000 Olympic Games in the 94 kg category as a junior. After the snatch portion of the competition he was in third place, behind Kourosh Bagheri and Kakhi Kakhiashvili. During the clean & jerk portion of the competition he was in second place with his first lift of 222.5 kg, that brought his total to 405.0 kg which tied the total of Kakhi Kakhiashvili. He attempted a lift of 227.5 kg, but was unable to make the lift and did not take another attempt. Kakhi Kakhiashvili, due to a light bodyweight (92.06 kg vs. 93.58 kg) was the gold medallist, with Kołecki taking home the silver medal. The 94 kg category had a spread of only 7.5 kg separating the 6th-place finisher and the gold medalist.

He was unable to participate in the 2004 Olympic Games due to a failed drug test. His B samples tested positive for the banned anabolic steroid nandrolone.

In 2008, he returned to the Olympics and competed in the 94 kg category at the 2008 Olympic Games. After the snatch portion of the competition he was in fourth place, behind Khadzhimurat Akkaev, Ilya Ilyin, Asghar Ebrahimi and Nizami Pashayev. In the clean & jerk portion he lifted 224 kg placing him in second place behind Ilya Ilyin's lift of 226 kg, he attempted a would-be Olympic Record lift of 228 kg but was unable to make the lift. Ilya Ilyin was the original gold medalist with Kołecki taking home the silver medal. In 2016 Ilya Ilyin was suspended due to failed samples containing Stanozolol and was disqualified from the 2008 Olympic Games, as a result Kołecki was awarded the gold medal.

=== Other information ===
Kołecki represented team Górnik Polkowice. He is 6 ft 1 in (1.85 m). His career was put on hold in the early 2000s (decade), due to a serious back injury.

Kołecki returned to weightlifting in late 2005, winning European Championships a few months later. He was also a member of Polish national team for the 2008 Olympic Games in Beijing, during which he claimed that his recently shaved head had a covert political message.

For his sport achievements, Kołecki received:
Golden Cross of Merit in 2000;
Knight's Cross of the Order of Polonia Restituta (5th Class) in 2008.

=== Major results ===
Year	Venue	Weight	Snatch (kg)				Clean & Jerk (kg)				Total	Rank
Year	Venue	Weight	1	2	3	Rank	1	2	3	Rank	Total	Rank
Olympic Games
2000	Sydney, Australia	94 kg	175.0	180.0	182.5	3	222.5	~~227.5~~	—	2	405.0	2nd place, silver medalist(s)
2008	Beijing, China	94 kg	174	177	179	2	217	224	~~228~~	1	403	1st place, gold medalist(s)
World Championships
1998	Lahti, Finland	94 kg	160.0	165.0	167.5	12	205.0	212.5	218.0	3rd place, bronze medalist(s)	385.0	5
1999	Athens, Greece	94 kg	175.0	180.0	~~182.5~~	4	222.5	225.0	~~235.0~~	2nd place, silver medalist(s)	405.0	2nd place, silver medalist(s)
2001	Antalya, Turkey	94 kg	172.5	~~177.5~~	~~177.5~~	9	220.0	230.0	~~237.5~~	1st place, gold medalist(s)	402.5	3rd place, bronze medalist(s)
2006	(Dominican Republic) Santo Domingo, Dominican Rep	94 kg	~~173~~	173	~~176~~	4	~~214~~	~~219~~	219	1st place, gold medalist(s)	392	2nd place, silver medalist(s)
2007	Chiang Mai, Thailand	94 kg	173	~~176~~	~~176~~	7	219	~~225~~	~~225~~	3rd place, bronze medalist(s)	392	3rd place, bronze medalist(s)
European Championships
1999	A Coruña, Spain	94 kg	172.5	177.5	180.0	1st place, gold medalist(s)	217.5	222.5	225.0	2nd place, silver medalist(s)	405.0	1st place, gold medalist(s)
2000	Sofia, Bulgaria	94 kg	175.0	180.0	~~182.5~~	1st place, gold medalist(s)	222.5	232.5 WR	—	1st place, gold medalist(s)	412.5	1st place, gold medalist(s)
2001	Trenčín, Slovakia	105 kg	180.0	~~185.0~~	~~185.0~~	6	~~227.5~~	227.5	232.5	1st place, gold medalist(s)	412.5	2nd place, silver medalist(s)
2003	Loutraki, Greece	105 kg	180.0	~~185.0~~	~~185.0~~	6	225.0	230.0	~~237.5~~	3rd place, bronze medalist(s)	410.0	4
2006	Władysławowo, Poland	94 kg	175	~~179~~	~~179~~	4	214	219	—	2nd place, silver medalist(s)	394	1st place, gold medalist(s)
2007	Strasbourg, France	94 kg	173	177	~~181~~	1st place, gold medalist(s)	216	218	—	1st place, gold medalist(s)	395	1st place, gold medalist(s)
2008	Lignano Sabbiadoro, Italy	94 kg	173	~~177~~	177	1st place, gold medalist(s)	~~220~~	220	~~226~~	1st place, gold medalist(s)	397	1st place, gold medalist(s)

== Mixed martial arts career ==
After amassing a professional mixed martial arts record of 6–1, Kołecki was signed to KSW. He made his promotional debut against Mariusz Pudzianowski in a heavyweight bout at KSW 47. Kołecki won the fight after Pudzianowski suffered a leg injury in the first round.

Next, Kołecki faced Damian Janikowski at KSW 52 on 7 December 2019. He won the fight via a second-round knockout.

Kołecki was scheduled to face Łukasz Jurkowski at KSW 55: Askham vs. Khalidov 2 on 10 October 2020. However, Kołecki had to withdraw from the bout due to an injury.

Kołecki then competed at KSW 58: Kołecki vs. Zawada against Martin Zawada on 30 January 2021. He won the fight via unanimous decision.

Kołecki faced Akop Szostak on 17 July 2021 at KSW 62: Kołecki vs. Szostak. He won the bout via knockout in the first minute off the bout.

== Mixed martial arts record ==
Professional record breakdown
16 matches	14 wins	2 losses
By knockout	10	1
By submission	1	0
By decision	3	1

Res.	Record	Opponent	Method	Event	Date	Round	Time	Location	Notes
Win	14–2	Stuart Austin	Submission (rear-naked choke)	Babilon MMA 57	March 27, 2026	2	3:22	Ciechanów, Poland	Return to Heavyweight. Won the vacant Babilon MMA Heavyweight Championship.
Win	13–2	Marcin Łazarz	TKO (punches)	Babilon MMA 55	November 21, 2025	3	3:15	Radom, Poland	Won the vacant Babilon MMA Light Heavyweight Championship.
Loss	12–2	Marcin Łazarz	KO (punches)	Babilon MMA 53	July 18, 2025	2	3:47	Międzyzdroje, Poland	
Win	12–1	Przemysław Mysiala	Decision (unanimous)	Babilon MMA 51	March 14, 2025	3	5:00	Ciechanów, Poland	
Win	11–1	Oli Thompson	Decision (unanimous)	Babilon MMA 50	December 7, 2024	3	5:00	Ozarow Mazowiecki, Poland	Heavyweight bout.
Win	10–1	Akop Szostak	KO (punch)	KSW 62	July 17, 2021	1	0:47	Warsaw, Poland	
Win	9–1	Martin Zawada	Decision (unanimous)	KSW 58	January 30, 2021	3	5:00	Łódź, Poland	
Win	8–1	Damian Janikowski	TKO (punches)	KSW 52	December 7, 2019	2	3:03	Gliwice, Poland	Catchweight (201 lb) bout.
Win	7–1	Mariusz Pudzianowski	TKO (leg injury)	KSW 47	March 23, 2019	1	4:29	Łódź, Poland	Heavyweight bout.
Loss	6–1	Michał Bobrowski	Decision (unanimous)	Babilon MMA 5	August 18, 2018	3	5:00	Międzyzdroje, Poland	
Win	6–0	Ivo Cuk	TKO (punches)	Babilon MMA 4	8 June 2018	1	0:45	Ełk, Poland	Catchweight (231 lb) bout.
Win	5–0	Łukasz Borowski	TKO (elbows)	Babilon MMA 3	March 17, 2018	1	2:55	Radom, Poland	Return to Light Heavyweight.
Win	4–0	Michał Orkowski	TKO (punches)	Babilon MMA 2	December 2, 2017	1	3:39	Legionowo, Poland	
Win	3–0	Łukasz Łysoniewski	TKO (punches)	Underground Boxing Show 9	October 21, 2017	1	3:00	Wieliczka, Poland	Heavyweight debut.
Win	2–0	Wojciech Balejko	TKO (punches)	PLMMA 73	May 20, 2017	1	2:19	Ciechanów, Poland	
Win	1–0	Dariusz Kazmierczuk	TKO (punches)	PLMMA 72	March 4, 2017	1	0:33	Łomianki, Poland	Light Heavyweight debut.

== See also ==
- List of current KSW fighters
- List of male mixed martial artists
