= Weightlifting at the 1993 Mediterranean Games =

Wrestling competition

- Dates: June 1993
- Competitors: 61 from 14 nations

The weightlifting tournament at the 1993 Mediterranean Games was held in Perpignan, France.

== Medal table ==
* Host nation (France)

Rank	Nation	Gold	Silver	Bronze	Total
1	Turkey	15	9	0	24
2	Greece	9	12	3	24
3	Egypt	2	3	10	15
4	France*	2	3	5	10
5	Algeria	2	1	3	6
6	Italy	0	2	4	6
7	Morocco	0	0	4	4
8	Tunisia	0	0	1	1
Totals (8 entries)		30	30	30	90

== Medal summary ==
=== Men's events ===
Event		Gold		Silver		Bronze	
54 kg	Snatch	Halil Mutlu (TUR)	110 kg	Giovanni Scarantino (ITA)	105 kg	Moustafa Buihamghet (MAR)	105 kg
54 kg	Clean & Jerk	Halil Mutlu (TUR)	140 kg	Éric Bonnel (FRA)	130 kg	Ashraf Mohamed (EGY)	127.5 kg
54 kg	Total	Halil Mutlu (TUR)	250 kg	Éric Bonnel (FRA)	232.5 kg	Giovanni Scarantino (ITA)	230 kg
59 kg	Snatch	Georgios Tzelilis (GRE)	127.5 kg	Hafız Süleymanoğlu (TUR)	125 kg	Ridha Ayachi (TUN)	117.5 kg
59 kg	Clean & Jerk	Hafız Süleymanoğlu (TUR)	157.5 kg	Georgios Tzelilis (GRE)	152.5 kg	Laurent Fombertasse (FRA)	147.5 kg
59 kg	Total	Hafız Süleymanoğlu (TUR)	282.5 kg	Georgios Tzelilis (GRE)	280 kg	Laurent Fombertasse (FRA)	262.5 kg
64 kg	Snatch	Fedail Güler (TUR)	132.5 kg	Mücahit Yağcı (TUR)	125 kg	Azzedine Basbas (ALG)	120 kg
64 kg	Clean & Jerk	Mücahit Yağcı (TUR)	165 kg	Fedail Güler (TUR)	162.5 kg	Azzedine Basbas (ALG)	157.5 kg
64 kg	Total	Fedail Güler (TUR)	295 kg	Mücahit Yağcı (TUR)	290 kg	Azzedine Basbas (ALG)	277.5 kg
70 kg	Snatch	Ergün Batmaz (TUR)	145 kg	Abdel Monaim Yahiaoui (ALG)	142.5 kg	Azeddine El-Yabouri (MAR)	130 kg
70 kg	Clean & Jerk	Abdel Monaim Yahiaoui (ALG)	180 kg	Ergün Batmaz (TUR)	175 kg	Azeddine El-Yabouri (MAR)	165 kg
70 kg	Total	Abdel Monaim Yahiaoui (ALG)	322.5 kg	Ergün Batmaz (TUR)	320 kg	Azeddine El-Yabouri (MAR)	295 kg
76 kg	Snatch	Christos Constandinidis (GRE)	147.5 kg	Hamdy Basiony Hassan (EGY)	145 kg	Viktor Mitrou (GRE)	145 kg
76 kg	Clean & Jerk	Hamdy Basiony Hassan (EGY)	180 kg	Christos Constandinidis (GRE)	177.5 kg	Viktor Mitrou (GRE)	177.5 kg
76 kg	Total	Hamdy Basiony Hassan (EGY)	325 kg	Christos Constandinidis (GRE)	325 kg	Viktor Mitrou (GRE)	322.5 kg
83 kg	Snatch	Sunay Bulut (TUR)	160 kg	Odysseas Romanidis (GRE)	152.5 kg	Cédric Plançon (FRA)	150 kg
83 kg	Clean & Jerk	Sunay Bulut (TUR)	200 kg	Odysseas Romanidis (GRE)	190 kg	Khalil El-Sayed (EGY)	187.5 kg
83 kg	Total	Sunay Bulut (TUR)	360 kg	Odysseas Romanidis (GRE)	342.5 kg	Khalil El-Sayed (EGY)	332.5 kg
91 kg	Snatch	Pyrros Dimas (GRE)	175 kg	Khaled Hassan (EGY)	152.5 kg	Luca Calzolari (ITA)	152.5 kg
91 kg	Clean & Jerk	Pyrros Dimas (GRE)	200 kg	Stéphane Sageder (FRA)	195 kg	Khaled Hassan (EGY)	192.5 kg
91 kg	Total	Pyrros Dimas (GRE)	375 kg	Khaled Hassan (EGY)	345 kg	Stéphane Sageder (FRA)	342.5 kg
99 kg	Snatch	Hüseyin Akkaya (TUR)	165 kg	Tharwat Abdelkader (EGY)	157.5 kg	Odisseas Dimas (GRE)	157.5 kg
99 kg	Clean & Jerk	Hüseyin Akkaya (TUR)	200 kg	Tharwat Abdelkader (EGY)	190 kg	Odisseas Dimas (GRE)	185 kg
99 kg	Total	Hüseyin Akkaya (TUR)	365 kg	Tharwat Abdelkader (EGY)	347.5 kg	Odisseas Dimas (GRE)	342.5 kg
108 kg	Snatch	Panagiotis Drakopoulos (GRE)	170 kg	Fabio Magrini (ITA)	167.5 kg	Francis Tournefier (FRA)	160 kg
108 kg	Clean & Jerk	Francis Tournefier (FRA)	215 kg	Panagiotis Drakopoulos (GRE)	205 kg	Fabio Magrini (ITA)	202.5 kg
108 kg	Total	Francis Tournefier (FRA)	375 kg	Panagiotis Drakopoulos (GRE)	375 kg	Fabio Magrini (ITA)	370 kg
+108 kg	Snatch	Pavlos Saltsidis (GRE)	180 kg	Erdinç Aslan (TUR)	170 kg	Elmahgoub Nada (EGY)	160 kg
+108 kg	Clean & Jerk	Pavlos Saltsidis (GRE)	220 kg	Erdinç Aslan (TUR)	215 kg	Elmahgoub Nada (EGY)	212.5 kg
+108 kg	Total	Pavlos Saltsidis (GRE)	400 kg	Erdinç Aslan (TUR)	385 kg	Elmahgoub Nada (EGY)	372.5 kg
