= Turkey Weightlifting Federation =

Sports governing body in Turkey

- Abbreviation: THF
- Formation: 1956
- Type: Sports federation
- Headquarters: Ulus, Ankara, Turkey
- Coordinates: 39°56′30.85″N 32°51′15.60″E
- President: Talat Ünlü
- Affiliations: European Weightlifting Federation (EWF)
- Website: www.halter.gov.tr

Turkey Weightlifting Federation (Turkish: Türkiye Halter Federasyonu, THF) is the governing body for weightlifting in Turkey. It aims to govern, encourage and develop the sport for all throughout the country.

== History ==
THF has been established in 1956. First president of the THF was Haşim Ekener. THF is a member of the European Weightlifting Federation (EWF).

The federation organizes the national weightlifting events, and European and World championships hosted by Turkey.

== International participation ==
=== Olympics ===
Year	Host country	Rank	Gold	Silver	Bronze	Total
1924	France	-	0	0	0	0
1928	Netherlands	-	0	0	0	0
1964	Japan	-	0	0	0	0
1972	West Germany	-	0	0	0	0
1976	Canada	-	0	0	0	0
1984	United States	-	0	0	0	0
1988	South Korea	4	1	0	0	1
1992	Spain	4	1	0	0	1
1996	United States	4	2	0	0	2
2000	Australia	6	1	0	0	1
2004	Greece	2	3	0	2	5
2008	China	-	0	0	0	0
2012	United Kingdom	-	0	0	0	0
2016	Brazil	13	0	1	0	1
2020	Japan	-	0	0	0	0

=== World Championships ===
Year	Host country	Rank	Gold	Silver	Bronze	Total
1989	United Kingdom	4	1	0	0	1
1991	Germany	6	1	0	0	1
1993	Australia	4	1	3	0	4
1994	Turkey	2	3	1	2	6
1995	China	5	1	2	1	4
1997	Thailand	8	0	2	0	2
1998	Finland	5	1	1	1	3
2001	Turkey	4	1	2	1	4
2002	Poland	11	0	1	0	1
2003	Canada	3	1	2	5	8
2005	Qatar	(suspended could not attend)				
2006	Dominican Republic	4	1	0	0	1
2007	Thailand	0	0	0	0	0
2009	South Korea	9	0	1	1	2
2010	Turkey	3	2	2	1	5
2011	France	6	0	1	1	2
2013	Poland	0	0	0	0	0
2014	Kazakhstan	8	0	1	0	1
2015	United States	16	0	0	1	1
2017	United States	(suspended could not attend)				
2018	Turkmenistan	0	0	0	0	0
2019	Thailand	8	1	0	0	1
2021	Uzbekistan	23	0	0	1	1
2022	Colombia	0	0	0	0	0

=== European Championships ===
Year	Host country	Rank	Gold	Silver	Bronze	Total
1997	Croatia	1	10	2	0	12
1998	Germany	6	0	2	2	4
1999	Spain	4	1	1	2	4
2000	Bulgaria	4	1	0	3	4
2001	Slovakia	2	3	0	1	4
2002	Turkey	2	2	3	4	9
2003	Greece	3	3	2	2	7
2004	Ukraine	1	6	3	2	11
2005	Bulgaria	2	4	3	0	7
2006	Poland	(suspended could not attend)				
2007	France	11	0	3	2	5
2008	Italy	3	2	3	0	5
2009	Romania	2	3	1	1	5
2010	Belarus	2	4	0	2	6
2011	Russia	2	4	2	3	9
2012	Turkey	3	2	3	3	8
2013	Albania	14	0	1	0	1
2014	Israel	8	1	0	1	2
2015	Georgia	1	2	2	1	5
2016	Norway	2	3	0	0	3
2017	Croatia	6	3	1	5	9
2018	Romania	(suspended could not attend)				
2019	Georgia	8	1	1	2	4
2021	Russia	9	1	0	3	4
2022	Albania	3	2	3	2	7
2023	Armenia	5	2	2	1	5

== Notable weightlifters ==
=== Men ===
- Naim Süleymanoğlu, triple Olympic, seven-times world and seven-times European champion
- Halil Mutlu, triple Olympic, five-times world and nine-times European champion
- Taner Sağır, Olympic, world and twice European champion
- Hafız Süleymanoğlu, world and triple European champion
- Fedail Güler, world and European champion
- Mete Binay, world champion
- Sedat Artuç, twice European champion
- Erol Bilgin, twice European champion
- Bünyamin Sezer, twice European champion
- Ekrem Celil, twice European champion
- Sunay Bulut, twice European champion
- Daniyar İsmayilov, twice European champion
- Muhammed Furkan Özbek, twice European champion
- Hurşit Atak, twice European
- İzzet İnce, European champion
- Semih Yağcı, European champion
- Hakan Yılmaz, European champion
- Ergün Batmaz, European champion

=== Women ===
- Nurcan Taylan, Olympic, triple European champion
- Sibel Özkan, World, twice European champion
- Şaziye Erdoğan, World, twice European champion
- Aylin Daşdelen, four-times European champion
- Sibel Şimşek, four times European champion
- Şule Şahbaz, European champion
- Emine Bilgin, European champion
- Ayşegül Çoban, European champion
- Cansu Bektaş, European champion
- Nuray Güngör, European champion

== International championships hosted in Turkey ==
- 1994 World Weightlifting Championships, November 17–27,Istanbul
- 2001 World Weightlifting Championships, November 4–11, Ankara
- 2002 European Weightlifting Championships, Antalya
- 2010 World Weightlifting Championships, September 17–26, Antalya
- 2012 European Weightlifting Championships, April 9–15, Antalya
- Weightlifting at the 2013 Mediterranean Games, June 21–26, Mersin
- Weightlifting at the 2021 Islamic Solidarity Games, August 11–15, Konya

== See also ==
- List of naturalized sportspeople of Turkey national weightlifting teams
