= 1995 European Weightlifting Championships =

Weightlifting Championship

1995 European Championships

The 1995 European Weightlifting Championships were held at the Torwar Hall in Warsaw, Poland from May 2 to May 7, 1995. It was the 74th edition of the men's event. There were a total number of 180 athletes competing, from 32 nations. The women competition were held in Beersheba, Israel. It was the 8th event for the women.

== Medal overview ==
=== Men ===
| Event | | Gold | | Silver | | Bronze | |
|---|---|---|---|---|---|---|---|
| – 54 kg | Snatch | (Turkey) Halil Mutlu | 130 kg | (Bulgaria) Ivan Ivanov | 120 kg | (Bulgaria) Stefan Georgiev | 115 kg |
| – 54 kg | Clean & Jerk | (Bulgaria) Ivan Ivanov | 157.5 kg | (Turkey) Halil Mutlu | 155 kg | (Bulgaria) Stefan Georgiev | 145 kg |
| – 54 kg | Total | (Turkey) Halil Mutlu | 285 kg | (Bulgaria) Ivan Ivanov | 277.5 kg | (Bulgaria) Stefan Georgiev | 260 kg |
| – 59 kg | Snatch | (Bulgaria) Sevdalin Minchev | 137.5 kg | (Bulgaria) Nikolay Peshalov | 135 kg | (Turkey) Hafiz Suleymanoglu | 135 kg |
| – 59 kg | Clean & Jerk | (Bulgaria) Nikolay Peshalov | 170 kg | (Bulgaria) Sevdalin Minchev | 165 kg | (Turkey) Hafiz Suleymanoglu | 162.5 kg |
| – 59 kg | Total | (Bulgaria) Nikolay Peshalov | 305 kg | (Bulgaria) Sevdalin Minchev | 302.5 kg | (Turkey) Hafiz Suleymanoglu | 297.5 kg |
| – 64 kg | Snatch | (Bulgaria) Petar Petrov | 145 kg | (Turkey) Naim Suleymanoglu | 142.5 kg | (Greece) Valerios Leonidis | 140 kg |
| – 64 kg | Clean & Jerk | (Turkey) Naim Suleymanoglu | 182.5 kg | (Greece) Valerios Leonidis | 182.5 kg | (Greece) Giorgios Tzelilis | 170 kg |
| – 64 kg | Total | (Turkey) Naim Suleymanoglu | 325 kg | (Greece) Valerios Leonidis | 322.5 kg | (Bulgaria) Petar Petrov | 310 kg |
| – 70 kg | Snatch | (Turkey) Fedail Guler | 157.5 kg | (Poland) Waldemar Kosinski | 157.5 kg | (Bulgaria) Radostin Dimitrov | 155 kg |
| – 70 kg | Clean & Jerk | (Turkey) Fedail Guler | 192.5 kg | (Hungary) Attila Feri | 190 kg | (Poland) Waldemar Kosinski | 187.5 kg |
| – 70 kg | Total | (Turkey) Fedail Guler | 350 kg | (Poland) Waldemar Kosinski | 345 kg | (Hungary) Attila Feri | 340 kg |
| – 76 kg | Snatch | (Belarus) Leonid Lobachev | 162.5 kg | (Poland) Andrzej Kozlowski | 160 kg | (Armenia) Khachatur Kyapanaktsyan | 160 kg |
| – 76 kg | Clean & Jerk | (Poland) Andrzej Kozlowski | 200 kg | (Armenia) Khachatur Kyapanaktsyan | 192.5 kg | (Poland) Miroslaw Chlebosz | 190 kg |
| – 76 kg | Total | (Poland) Andrzej Kozlowski | 360 kg | (Armenia) Khachatur Kyapanaktsyan | 352.5 kg | (Armenia) Hovhannes Barseghyan | 350 kg |
| – 83 kg | Snatch | (Greece) Pyrros Dimas | 177.5 kg | (Poland) Andrzej Cofalik | 167.5 kg | (Ukraine) Oleksandr Blyshchyk | 167.5 kg |
| – 83 kg | Clean & Jerk | (Greece) Pyrros Dimas | 210 kg | (Poland) Andrzej Cofalik | 205 kg | (Georgia (country)) Bidzina Mikiashvili | 205 kg |
| – 83 kg | Total | (Greece) Pyrros Dimas | 387.5 kg | (Poland) Andrzej Cofalik | 372.5 kg | (Turkey) Dursun Sevinc | 365 kg |
| – 91 kg | Snatch | (Greece) Akakios Kakiasvilis | 180 kg | (Bulgaria) Plamen Bratoychev | 177.5 kg | (Armenia) Aleksander Karapetyan | 172.5 kg |
| – 91 kg | Clean & Jerk | (Greece) Akakios Kakiasvilis | 227.5 kg | (Greece) Leonidas Kokas | 212.5 kg | (Turkey) Sunay Bulut | 212.5 kg |
| – 91 kg | Total | (Greece) Akakios Kakiasvilis | 407.5 kg | (Bulgaria) Plamen Bratoychev | 387.5 kg | (Armenia) Aleksander Karapetyan | 382.5 kg |
| – 99 kg | Snatch | (Ukraine) Denys Hotfrid | 180 kg | (Belarus) Vladimir Yemelyanov | 177.5 kg | (Armenia) Aghvan Grigoryan | 175 kg |
| – 99 kg | Clean & Jerk | (Russia) Dimitri Smirnov | 220 kg | (Belarus) Oleg Chiritso | 220 kg | (Poland) Krzysztof Zawadki | 220 kg |
| – 99 kg | Total | (Belarus) Oleg Chiritso | 395 kg | (Ukraine) Denys Hotfrid | 395 kg | (Poland) Krzysztof Zawadki | 392.5 kg |
| – 108 kg | Snatch | (Russia) Sergey Syrtsov | 185 kg | (Georgia (country)) Mukhran Gogia | 180 kg | (Armenia) Ara Vardanyan | 180 kg |
| – 108 kg | Clean & Jerk | (Poland) Dariusz Osuch | 227.5 kg | (Russia) Sergey Syrtsov | 225 kg | (Russia) Sergey Flerko | 222.5 kg |
| – 108 kg | Total | (Russia) Sergey Syrtsov | 410 kg | (Poland) Dariusz Osuch | 400 kg | (Russia) Sergey Flerko | 400 kg |
| + 108 kg | Snatch | (Russia) Andrei Chemerkin | 190 kg | (Turkey) Erdinç Arslan | 185 kg | (Greece) Pavlos Saltsidis | 182.5 kg |
| + 108 kg | Clean & Jerk | (Russia) Andrei Chemerkin | 252.5 kg | (Germany) Manfred Nerlinger | 235 kg | (Belarus) Alexei Krusevich | 232.5 kg |
| + 108 kg | Total | (Russia) Andrei Chemerkin | 442.5 kg | (Germany) Manfred Nerlinger | 417.5 kg | (Greece) Pavlos Saltsidis | 412.5 kg |

== Medals tables ==
Ranking by "Big" (Total result) medals

Host nation

| Place | Nation | 1st place, gold medalist(s) | 2nd place, silver medalist(s) | 3rd place, bronze medalist(s) | Total |
|---|---|---|---|---|---|
| 1 | Turkey | 3 | 0 | 2 | 5 |
| 2 | Greece | 2 | 1 | 1 | 4 |
| 3 | Russia | 2 | 0 | 1 | 3 |
| 4 | Bulgaria | 1 | 3 | 2 | 6 |
| 5 | Poland | 1 | 3 | 1 | 5 |
| 6 | Belarus | 1 | 0 | 0 | 1 |
| 7 | Armenia | 0 | 1 | 2 | 3 |
| 8 | Germany | 0 | 1 | 0 | 1 |
| 8 | Ukraine | 0 | 1 | 0 | 1 |
| 10 | Hungary | 0 | 0 | 1 | 1 |
| Total | | 10 | 10 | 10 | 30 |
