= Weightlifting at the 1997 Mediterranean Games =

Wrestling competition

- Dates: 13-25 June 1997

The weightlifting tournament at the 1997 Mediterranean Games was held in Bari, Italy.

== Medal table ==
* Host nation (Italy)

Rank	Nation	Gold	Silver	Bronze	Total
1	Turkey	13	3	4	20
2	Greece	5	4	3	12
3	Egypt	0	3	7	10
4	Italy*	0	3	3	6
5	France	0	2	0	2
5	Spain	0	2	0	2
7	Algeria	0	1	1	2
Totals (7 entries)		18	18	18	54

== Medal summary ==
=== Men's events ===
Event		Gold		Silver		Bronze	
54 kg	Snatch	Halil Mutlu (TUR)	120 kg	Éric Bonnel (FRA)	110 kg	Ali Hemid (EGY)	107.5 kg
54 kg	Clean & Jerk	Halil Mutlu (TUR)	142.5 kg	Éric Bonnel (FRA)	137.5 kg	Giovanni Scarantino (ITA)	127.5 kg
59 kg	Snatch	Leonidas Sabanis (GRE)	125 kg	Sedat Artuç (TUR)	115 kg	Mohamed Osman (EGY)	115 kg
59 kg	Clean & Jerk	Leonidas Sabanis (GRE)	155 kg	Mohamed Osman (EGY)	155 kg	Sedat Artuç (TUR)	152.5 kg
64 kg	Snatch	Hafız Süleymanoğlu (TUR)	145 kg	Yosry Shalaly (EGY)	132.5 kg	Mücahit Yağcı (TUR)	130 kg
64 kg	Clean & Jerk	Georgios Tzelilis (GRE)	162.5 kg	Mücahit Yağcı (TUR)	160 kg	Hafız Süleymanoğlu (TUR)	160 kg
70 kg	Snatch	Fedail Güler (TUR)	145 kg	Alexandros Politidis (GRE)	140 kg	Abdel Monaim Yahiaoui (ALG)	135 kg
70 kg	Clean & Jerk	Fedail Güler (TUR)	175 kg	Abdel Monaim Yahiaoui (ALG)	172.5 kg	Ahmed Hashem (EGY)	170 kg
76 kg	Snatch	Mehmet Yılmaz (TUR)	150 kg	Christos Spyrou (GRE)	145 kg	Viktor Mitrou (GRE)	140 kg
76 kg	Clean & Jerk	Viktor Mitrou (GRE)	180 kg	Raafat Eissawy (EGY)	177.5 kg	Mehmet Yılmaz (TUR)	170 kg
83 kg	Snatch	Dursun Sevinç (TUR)	160 kg	Sergio Mannironi (ITA)	155 kg	Nasser Adel (EGY)	155 kg
83 kg	Clean & Jerk	Dursun Sevinç (TUR)	192.5 kg	Diego Facca (ITA)	190 kg	Sergio Mannironi (ITA)	187.5 kg
91 kg	Snatch	Bünyamin Sudaş (TUR)	165 kg	Leonidas Kokas (GRE)	160 kg	Nasser Helal (EGY)	155 kg
91 kg	Clean & Jerk	Bünyamin Sudaş (TUR)	200 kg	Francesco De Tommaso (ITA)	197.5 kg	Leonidas Kokas (GRE)	197.5 kg
99 kg	Snatch	Sunay Bulut (TUR)	170 kg	Akakios Kahiasvilis (GRE)	167.5 kg	Tharwat El Bendari (EGY)	167.5 kg
99 kg	Clean & Jerk	Akakios Kahiasvilis (GRE)	212.5 kg	Sunay Bulut (TUR)	210 kg	Tharwat El Bendari (EGY)	210 kg
+108 kg	Snatch	Erdinç Aslan (TUR)	170 kg	Jon Tecedor Aguinaga (ESP)	165 kg	Oleg Panatidis (GRE)	162.5 kg
+108 kg	Clean & Jerk	Erdinç Aslan (TUR)	215 kg	Bruno Soto Carazo (ESP)	215 kg	Vanni Lauzana (ITA)	212.5 kg
