= Igor Alexeyev =

Igor Alexeyev may refer to:

- Igor Alekseyev (politician) (born 1960), Ukrainian military officer, diplomat, and politician
- Igor Alekseyev (weightlifter) (born 1972), Russian weightlifter
- Igor Alexeyev (footballer) (born 1984), Russian footballer
