= Weightlifting at the 1992 Summer Olympics – Men's 110 kg =

Weightlifting at the Olympics

Men's 110 kg at the Games of the XXV Olympiad
- Venue: Pavelló de l'Espanya Industrial
- Date: 3 August 1992
- Competitors: 24 from 20 nations
- Winning total: 432.5 kg

Medalists
1st place, gold medalist(s)		Ronny Weller	Germany
2nd place, silver medalist(s)		Artur Akoyev	Unified Team
3rd place, bronze medalist(s)		Stefan Botev	Bulgaria

The Men's Heavyweight Weightlifting Event (– 110 kg) is the second heaviest men's event at the weightlifting competition, limiting competitors to a maximum of 110.0 kilograms of body mass. The competition took place on 3 August in the Pavelló de l'Espanya Industrial.

Each lifter performed in both the snatch and clean and jerk lifts, with the final score being the sum of the lifter's best result in each. The athlete received three attempts in each of the two lifts; the score for the lift was the heaviest weight successfully lifted. Ties were broken by the lifter with the lightest body weight.

== Results ==
Rank	Name	Body weight	Snatch (kg)			Clean & Jerk (kg)			Total (kg)
Rank	Name	Body weight	1	2	3	1	2	3	Total (kg)
1st place, gold medalist(s)	Ronny Weller (GER)	109.40	185.0	190.0	192.5	225.0	235.0	240.0	432.5
2nd place, silver medalist(s)	Artur Akoyev (EUN)	109.40	190.0	~~195.0~~	195.0	230.0	235.0	~~237.5~~	430.0
3rd place, bronze medalist(s)	Stefan Botev (BUL)	108.50	185.0	~~190.0~~	190.0	227.5	~~237.5~~	~~237.5~~	417.5
4	Nicu Vlad (ROU)	103.10	~~185.0~~	185.0	190.0	215.0	~~227.5~~	~~227.5~~	405.0
5	Dariusz Osuch (POL)	108.50	165.0	170.0	175.0	212.5	217.5	222.5	397.5
6	Frank Seipelt (GER)	109.75	162.5	170.0	~~172.5~~	205.0	212.5	220.0	390.0
7	Flavio Villavicencio (CUB)	108.40	~~170.0~~	~~170.0~~	170.0	210.0	217.5	~~222.5~~	387.5
8	Pavlos Saltsidis (GRE)	108.95	170.0	175.0	~~177.5~~	~~210.0~~	210.0	~~215.0~~	385.0
9	Dede Dekaj (ALB)	109.75	162.5	~~167.5~~	~~167.5~~	210.0	~~215.0~~	217.5	380.0
10	Norberto Oberburger (ITA)	109.25	170.0	175.0	~~177.5~~	195.0	~~200.0~~	200.0	375.0
11	Maurys Charón (CUB)	109.65	~~170.0~~	~~170.0~~	170.0	~~205.0~~	~~205.0~~	205.0	375.0
12	László Németh (HUN)	109.50	172.5	~~177.5~~	177.5	200.0	~~205.0~~	~~205.0~~	372.5
13	Arto Savonen (FIN)	109.20	155.0	162.5	~~167.5~~	190.0	195.0	~~200.0~~	357.5
14	Mohammed Jowad (IRQ)	109.85	152.5	157.5	160.0	192.5	197.5	~~200.0~~	357.5
15	Tibor Stark (HUN)	108.70	160.0	165.0	~~167.5~~	190.0	~~195.0~~	-	355.0
16	Miloš Čiernik (TCH)	107.85	~~155.0~~	155.0	160.0	192.5	~~200.0~~	~~200.0~~	352.5
17	Raymond Kopka (GBR)	109.30	155.0	160.0	~~162.5~~	~~190.0~~	190.0	~~197.5~~	350.0
18	Rich Schutz (USA)	106.10	~~155.0~~	~~155.0~~	155.0	~~192.5~~	192.5	~~197.5~~	347.5
19	Mozafar Ajali (IRI)	105.20	150.0	155.0	~~160.0~~	190.0	~~200.0~~	~~200.0~~	345.0
20	Mehmed Skender (BIH)	107.10	140.0	~~150.0~~	~~150.0~~	170.0	175.0	180.0	320.0
21	Anders Lindsjö (SWE)	109.35	~~155.0~~	~~155.0~~	160.0	~~192.5~~	~~192.5~~	~~192.5~~	DNF
22	Jeon Sang-seok (KOR)	108.60	175.0	~~180.0~~	~~180.0~~	~~210.0~~	~~210.0~~	~~210.0~~	DNF
23	Piotr Banaszak (POL)	108.60	~~180.0~~	185.0	~~190.0~~	~~210.0~~	~~210.0~~	~~210.0~~	DNF
-	Ibrahim El-Bakh (EGY)	108.65	~~155.0~~	~~155.0~~	~~160.0~~	-	-	-	DNF
