= Weightlifting at the 2001 Mediterranean Games =

The weightlifting competitions at the 2001 Mediterranean Games in Tunis between 3 September and 8 September.

Athletes competed in 30 events across 15 weight categories (8 for men and 7 for women).

== Medal table ==
Key:

* Host nation (Tunisia)

Rank	Nation	Gold	Silver	Bronze	Total
1	Turkey	13	4	2	19
2	Greece	8	10	2	20
3	Tunisia*	5	0	2	7
4	Spain	4	5	5	14
5	Egypt	0	6	6	12
6	Italy	0	3	2	5
7	France	0	1	7	8
8	Albania	0	1	0	1
9	Algeria	0	0	2	2
9	Syria	0	0	2	2
Totals (10 entries)		30	30	30	90

== Medal summary ==
=== Men's events ===
Event		Gold	Silver	Bronze
56 kg	Snatch	Sedat Artuç (TUR)	Gülbeyi Akti (TUR)	Eric Bonnel (FRA)
56 kg	Clean & Jerk	Sedat Artuç (TUR)	Gülbeyi Akti (TUR)	Eric Bonnel (FRA)
62 kg	Snatch	Atef Jarray (TUN)	Leonidas Sabanis (GRE)	Mohamed Hussein (EGY)
62 kg	Clean & Jerk	Leonidas Sabanis (GRE)	Mohamed Hussein (EGY)	Atef Jarray (TUN)
69 kg	Snatch	Youssef Sbai (TUN)	Mohamed El-Tantawy (EGY)	Spyridon Stamatiadis (GRE)
69 kg	Clean & Jerk	Youssef Sbai (TUN)	Reyhan Arabacıoğlu (TUR)	Yosry Hassan (EGY)
77 kg	Snatch	Mohamed Mejri (TUN)	Christos Christoforidis (GRE)	Kais Ayadi (TUN)
77 kg	Clean & Jerk	Mohamed Mejri (TUN)	Christos Christoforidis (GRE)	Ahmed Hashem (EGY)
85 kg	Snatch	Mehmet Yılmaz (TUR)	Christos Spyrou (GRE)	Khajik Khajouiane (SYR)
85 kg	Clean & Jerk	Mehmet Yılmaz (TUR)	Ilir Kafarni (ALB)	Christos Spyrou (GRE)
94 kg	Snatch	Leonidas Kokas (GRE)	Mohamed Mousa (EGY)	Santiago Martínez (ESP)
94 kg	Clean & Jerk	Leonidas Kokas (GRE)	Konstantinos Gkaripis (GRE)	Santiago Martínez (ESP)
105 kg	Snatch	Bünyamin Sudaş (TUR)	Moreno Boer (ITA)	Mohamed Sheikh Ali (SYR)
105 kg	Clean & Jerk	Bünyamin Sudaş (TUR)	Moreno Boer (ITA)	Ahmed Hussein (EGY)
+105 kg	Snatch	Abdulaziz Alpak (TUR)	Hany Ibrahim (EGY)	Apolosio Tokotuu (FRA)
+105 kg	Clean & Jerk	Abdulaziz Alpak (TUR)	Hany Ibrahim (EGY)	Apolosio Tokotuu (FRA)

=== Women's events ===
Event		Gold	Silver	Bronze
48 kg	Snatch	Gema Peris (ESP)	Eva Giganti (ITA)	Maria Jose Tocino (ESP)
48 kg	Clean & Jerk	Gema Peris (ESP)	Sabrina Richard (FRA)	Eva Giganti (ITA)
53 kg	Snatch	Rebeca Sires (ESP)	Estefania Juan (ESP)	Silvia Puxeddu (ITA)
53 kg	Clean & Jerk	Estefania Juan (ESP)	Rebeca Sires (ESP)	Dahbia Rigaud (FRA)
58 kg	Snatch	Emine Bilgin (TUR)	Abigail Guerrero (ESP)	Wahiba Belghandi (ALG)
58 kg	Clean & Jerk	Emine Bilgin (TUR)	Abigail Guerrero (ESP)	Wahiba Belghandi (ALG)
63 kg	Snatch	Anastasia Tsakiri (GRE)	Konstantina Misirli (GRE)	Josefa Pérez (ESP)
63 kg	Clean & Jerk	Anastasia Tsakiri (GRE)	Konstantina Misirli (GRE)	Josefa Pérez (ESP)
69 kg	Snatch	Döndü Ay (TUR)	Maria Tatsi (GRE)	Sibel Şimşek (TUR)
69 kg	Clean & Jerk	Maria Tatsi (GRE)	Madiha Saber (EGY)	Döndü Ay (TUR)
75 kg	Snatch	Aysel Özgür (TUR)	Mónica Carrio (ESP)	Nagham el-Moaty (EGY)
75 kg	Clean & Jerk	Filippia Kochliaridou (GRE)	Christina Ioannidi (GRE)	Nagham el-Moaty (EGY)
+75 kg	Snatch	Katerina Roditi (GRE)	Şule Şahbaz (TUR)	Sylvie Iskin (FRA)
+75 kg	Clean & Jerk	Derya Açikgöz (TUR)	Katerina Roditi (GRE)	Sylvie Iskin (FRA)
