= 1990 World Weightlifting Championships =

Weightlifting tournament

1990 World Championships
- Host city: Various cities
- Dates: 10–18 November (M); 26 May-3 June(F)

The following is the final results of the 1990 World Weightlifting Championships. Men's competition were held in Budapest, Hungary between 10–18 November and Women's competition were held in Sarajevo, SR Bosnia and Herzegovina, Socialist Federal Republic of Yugoslavia between 26 May and 3 June.

== Medal summary ==
=== Men ===
Event	Gold		Silver		Bronze	
52 kg
Snatch	Zhang Zairong; China	117.5 kg	Huang Xiliang; China	115.0 kg	Ivan Ivanov; Bulgaria	115.0 kg
Clean & Jerk	Ivan Ivanov; Bulgaria	150.0 kg	Kim Myong-sik; North Korea	137.5 kg	Kim Jong-nam; North Korea	137.5 kg
Total	Ivan Ivanov; Bulgaria	265.0 kg	Huang Xiliang; China	250.0 kg	Zhang Zairong; China	247.5 kg
56 kg
Snatch	Hafız Süleymanoğlu; Turkey	132.5 kg	Liu Shoubin; China	130.0 kg	He Yingqiang; China	125.0 kg
Clean & Jerk	He Yingqiang; China	160.0 kg	Liu Shoubin; China	155.0 kg	Chun Byung-kwan; South Korea	155.0 kg
Total	Liu Shoubin; China	285.0 kg	He Yingqiang; China	285.0 kg	Chun Byung-kwan; South Korea	277.5 kg
60 kg
Snatch	Kim Yong-su; North Korea	135.0 kg	Ri Jae-son; North Korea	132.5 kg	Luo Jianming; China	130.0 kg
Clean & Jerk	Nikolay Peshalov; Bulgaria	170.0 kg	Kim Yong-su; North Korea	160.0 kg	Luo Jianming; China	157.5 kg
Total	Nikolay Peshalov; Bulgaria	297.5 kg	Kim Yong-su; North Korea	295.0 kg	Luo Jianming; China	287.5 kg
67.5 kg
Snatch	Kim Myong-nam; North Korea	157.5 kg	Yoto Yotov; Bulgaria	152.5 kg	Valery Yurov; Soviet Union	150.0 kg
Clean & Jerk	Ri Hi-bong; North Korea	185.0 kg	Kim Myong-nam; North Korea	185.0 kg	Yoto Yotov; Bulgaria	180.0 kg
Total	Kim Myong-nam; North Korea	342.5 kg	Yoto Yotov; Bulgaria	332.5 kg	Ri Hi-bong; North Korea	330.0 kg
75 kg
Snatch	Tudor Casapu; Soviet Union	157.5 kg	Yordan Yordanov; Bulgaria	155.0 kg	Jon Chol-ho; North Korea	155.0 kg
Clean & Jerk	Tudor Casapu; Soviet Union	202.5 kg	Andrei Socaci; Romania	190.0 kg	Vasil Vanev; Bulgaria	187.5 kg
Total	Tudor Casapu; Soviet Union	360.0 kg	Andrei Socaci; Romania	345.0 kg	Yordan Yordanov; Bulgaria	342.5 kg
82.5 kg
Snatch	Altimurat Orazdurdiev; Soviet Union	172.5 kg	Sergey Li; Soviet Union	167.5 kg	Kiril Kounev; Bulgaria	165.0 kg
Clean & Jerk	Sergey Li; Soviet Union	207.5 kg	Altimurat Orazdurdiev; Soviet Union	205.0 kg	Kiril Kounev; Bulgaria	195.0 kg
Total	Altimurat Orazdurdiev; Soviet Union	377.5 kg	Sergey Li; Soviet Union	375.0 kg	Kiril Kounev; Bulgaria	360.0 kg
90 kg
Snatch	Anatoly Khrapaty; Soviet Union	180.0 kg	Ivan Chakarov; Bulgaria	177.5 kg	Kim Byung-chan; South Korea	167.5 kg
Clean & Jerk	Anatoly Khrapaty; Soviet Union	217.5 kg	Ivan Chakarov; Bulgaria	215.0 kg	Kim Byung-chan; South Korea	205.0 kg
Total	Anatoly Khrapaty; Soviet Union	397.5 kg	Ivan Chakarov; Bulgaria	392.5 kg	Kim Byung-chan; South Korea	372.5 kg
100 kg
Snatch	Nicu Vlad; Romania	192.5 kg	Sergey Kopytov; Soviet Union	180.0 kg	Igor Sadykov; Soviet Union	177.5 kg
Clean & Jerk	Igor Sadykov; Soviet Union	222.5 kg	Sergey Kopytov; Soviet Union	220.0 kg	Nicu Vlad; Romania	220.0 kg
Total	Nicu Vlad; Romania	412.5 kg	Igor Sadykov; Soviet Union	400.0 kg	Sergey Kopytov; Soviet Union	400.0 kg
110 kg
Snatch	Stefan Botev; Bulgaria	200.0 kg	Pavlos Saltsidis; Greece	172.5 kg	Nail Mukhamedyarov; Soviet Union	170.0 kg
Clean & Jerk	Stefan Botev; Bulgaria	240.0 kg	Nail Mukhamedyarov; Soviet Union	220.0 kg	Pavlos Saltsidis; Greece	210.0 kg
Total	Stefan Botev; Bulgaria	440.0 kg	Nail Mukhamedyarov; Soviet Union	390.0 kg	Pavlos Saltsidis; Greece	382.5 kg
+110 kg
Snatch	Leonid Taranenko; Soviet Union	195.0 kg	Artur Akoyev; Soviet Union	170.0 kg	Erdinç Arslan; Turkey	167.5 kg
Clean & Jerk	Leonid Taranenko; Soviet Union	255.0 kg	Artur Akoyev; Soviet Union	220.0 kg	Jiří Zubrický; Czechoslovakia	215.0 kg
Total	Leonid Taranenko; Soviet Union	450.0 kg	Artur Akoyev; Soviet Union	390.0 kg	Jiří Zubrický; Czechoslovakia	380.0 kg

=== Women ===
Event	Gold		Silver		Bronze	
44 kg
Snatch	Wu Xiangmei; China	70.0 kg	Satomi Saito; Japan	60.0 kg	Bastiyah Said Muhamad; Indonesia	60.0 kg
Clean & Jerk	Wu Xiangmei; China	82.5 kg	Satomi Saito; Japan	80.0 kg	Bastiyah Said Muhamad; Indonesia	75.0 kg
Total	Wu Xiangmei; China	152.5 kg	Satomi Saito; Japan	140.0 kg	Bastiyah Said Muhamad; Indonesia	135.0 kg
48 kg
Snatch	Cai Jun; China	72.5 kg	Ri Yong-hwa; North Korea	65.0 kg	Choi Myung-shik; South Korea	65.0 kg
Clean & Jerk	Cai Jun; China	92.5 kg	Choi Myung-shik; South Korea	85.0 kg	Ri Yong-hwa; North Korea	82.5 kg
Total	Cai Jun; China	165.0 kg	Choi Myung-shik; South Korea	150.0 kg	Ri Yong-hwa; North Korea	147.5 kg
52 kg
Snatch	Liao Shuping; China	75.0 kg	Hiromi Uemura; Japan	75.0 kg	Pauline Haughton; Great Britain	67.5 kg
Clean & Jerk	Liao Shuping; China	102.5 kg	Hiromi Uemura; Japan	92.5 kg	Pauline Haughton; Great Britain	82.5 kg
Total	Liao Shuping; China	177.5 kg	Hiromi Uemura; Japan	167.5 kg	Pauline Haughton; Great Britain	150.0 kg
56 kg
Snatch	Wu Haiqing; China	82.5 kg	Ni Chia-ping; Chinese Taipei	77.5 kg	Janeta Georgieva; Bulgaria	77.5 kg
Clean & Jerk	Wu Haiqing; China	107.5 kg WR	Ni Chia-ping; Chinese Taipei	97.5 kg	Patmawati Abdul Hamid; Indonesia	97.5 kg
Total	Wu Haiqing; China	190.0 kg WR	Ni Chia-ping; Chinese Taipei	175.0 kg	Janeta Georgieva; Bulgaria	175.0 kg
60 kg
Snatch	Maria Christoforidou; Greece	87.5 kg	Ji Qinghua; China	85.0 kg	Won Soon-yi; South Korea	85.0 kg
Clean & Jerk	Maria Christoforidou; Greece	110.0 kg	Ji Qinghua; China	107.5 kg	Daniela Kerkelova; Bulgaria	105.0 kg
Total	Maria Christoforidou; Greece	197.5 kg	Ji Qinghua; China	192.5 kg	Daniela Kerkelova; Bulgaria	187.5 kg
67.5 kg
Snatch	Wang Genying; China	95.0 kg	Camelia Nikolaeva; Bulgaria	92.5 kg	Mária Takács; Hungary	90.0 kg
Clean & Jerk	Wang Genying; China	117.5 kg	Camelia Nikolaeva; Bulgaria	117.5 kg	Mária Takács; Hungary	112.5 kg
Total	Wang Genying; China	212.5 kg	Camelia Nikolaeva; Bulgaria	210.0 kg	Mária Takács; Hungary	202.5 kg
75 kg
Snatch	Milena Trendafilova; Bulgaria	102.5 kg WR	Li Changping; China	92.5 kg	Chen Shu-chih; Chinese Taipei	92.5 kg
Clean & Jerk	Milena Trendafilova; Bulgaria	135.0 kg WR	Li Changping; China	127.5 kg	Chen Shu-chih; Chinese Taipei	112.5 kg
Total	Milena Trendafilova; Bulgaria	237.5 kg WR	Li Changping; China	220.0 kg	Chen Shu-chih; Chinese Taipei	205.0 kg
82.5 kg
Snatch	María Isabel Urrutia; Colombia	100.0 kg	Valkana Tosheva; Bulgaria	90.0 kg	Chung Sook-kwon; South Korea	82.5 kg
Clean & Jerk	María Isabel Urrutia; Colombia	130.0 kg	Valkana Tosheva; Bulgaria	120.0 kg	Chung Sook-kwon; South Korea	102.5 kg
Total	María Isabel Urrutia; Colombia	230.0 kg	Valkana Tosheva; Bulgaria	210.0 kg	Chung Sook-kwon; South Korea	185.0 kg
+82.5 kg
Snatch	Karyn Marshall; United States	112.5 kg WR	Li Yajuan; China	102.5 kg	Christina Ilieva; Bulgaria	90.0 kg
Clean & Jerk	Li Yajuan; China	142.5 kg WR	Karyn Marshall; United States	130.0 kg	Christina Ilieva; Bulgaria	107.5 kg
Total	Li Yajuan; China	245.0 kg WR	Karyn Marshall; United States	242.5 kg	Christina Ilieva; Bulgaria	197.5 kg

== Medal table ==
Ranking by Big (Total result) medals

Rank	Nation	Gold	Silver	Bronze	Total
1	China	7	4	2	13
2	Bulgaria	4	4	5	13
3	Soviet Union	4	4	1	9
4	North Korea	1	1	2	4
5	Romania	1	1	0	2
6	Greece	1	0	1	2
7	Colombia	1	0	0	1
8	Japan	0	2	0	2
9	South Korea	0	1	3	4
10	Chinese Taipei	0	1	1	2
11	United States	0	1	0	1
12	Czechoslovakia	0	0	1	1
12	Great Britain	0	0	1	1
12	Hungary	0	0	1	1
12	Indonesia	0	0	1	1
Totals (15 entries)		19	19	19	57

Ranking by all medals: Big (Total result) and Small (Snatch and Clean & Jerk)

Rank	Nation	Gold	Silver	Bronze	Total
1	China	20	12	5	37
2	Soviet Union	13	11	4	28
3	Bulgaria	10	12	14	36
4	North Korea	4	6	5	15
5	Greece	3	1	2	6
6	Colombia	3	0	0	3
7	Romania	2	2	1	5
8	United States	1	2	0	3
9	Turkey	1	0	1	2
10	Japan	0	6	0	6
11	Chinese Taipei	0	3	3	6
12	South Korea	0	2	10	12
13	Indonesia	0	0	4	4
14	Great Britain	0	0	3	3
14	Hungary	0	0	3	3
16	Czechoslovakia	0	0	2	2
Totals (16 entries)		57	57	57	171
