= Weightlifting at the 1996 Summer Olympics – Men's 76 kg =

Weightlifting at the Olympics

Men's 76 kg at the Games of the XXVI Olympiad
- Venue: Georgia World Congress Center
- Date: 24 July 1996
- Competitors: 24 from 21 nations
- Winning total: 367.5 kg

Medalists
1st place, gold medalist(s)		Pablo Lara	Cuba
2nd place, silver medalist(s)		Yoto Yotov	Bulgaria
3rd place, bronze medalist(s)		Chon Chol-Ho	North Korea

These are the results of the men's 76 kg competition in weightlifting at the 1996 Summer Olympics in Atlanta. A total of 24 athletes entered this event. The weightlifter from Cuba won the gold, with a combined lift of 367.5 kg.

== Results ==
Each weightlifter had three attempts for both the snatch and clean and jerk lifting methods. The total of the best successful lift of each method was used to determine the final rankings and medal winners.

Rank	Athlete	Group	Body weight	Snatch (kg)				Clean & Jerk (kg)				Total
Rank	Athlete	Group	Body weight	1	2	3	Result	1	2	3	Result	Total
1st place, gold medalist(s)	Pablo Lara (CUB)	A	75.91	157.5	162.5	~~167.5~~	162.5	200.0	205.0	~~210.0~~	205.0	367.5
2nd place, silver medalist(s)	Yoto Yotov (BUL)	A	75.91	155.0	160.0	~~162.5~~	160.0	192.5	200.0	–	200.0	360.0
3rd place, bronze medalist(s)	Jon Chol-ho (PRK)	A	75.62	157.5	162.5	~~165.0~~	162.5	190.0	195.0	~~197.5~~	195.0	357.5
4	Viktor Mitrou (GRE)	A	75.82	155.0	160.0	162.5	162.5	~~195.0~~	~~195.0~~	195.0	195.0	357.5
5	Lin Shoufeng (CHN)	A	75.91	152.5	157.5	~~160.0~~	157.5	195.0	~~202.5~~	~~202.5~~	195.0	352.5
6	Ingo Steinhöfel (GER)	A	75.77	157.5	160.0	~~162.5~~	160.0	187.5	~~190.0~~	~~190.0~~	187.5	347.5
7	Sergey Filimonov (RUS)	B	75.96	155.0	160.0	~~165.0~~	160.0	185.0	~~190.0~~	~~190.0~~	185.0	345.0
8	Hovhannes Barseghyan (ARM)	A	75.97	155.0	~~160.0~~	~~160.0~~	155.0	190.0	~~195.0~~	~~195.0~~	190.0	345.0
9	Leonid Lobachov (BLR)	A	75.65	152.5	157.5	160.0	160.0	~~182.5~~	182.5	~~190.0~~	182.5	342.5
10	Andrey Poitschke (GER)	B	75.41	150.0	155.0	~~157.5~~	155.0	172.5	~~177.5~~	180.0	180.0	335.0
11	Oleg Kechko (BLR)	A	75.79	150.0	155.0	~~157.5~~	155.0	180.0	~~187.5~~	~~187.5~~	180.0	335.0
12	Álvaro Velasco (COL)	B	75.92	145.0	~~150.0~~	~~150.0~~	145.0	175.0	~~180.0~~	180.0	180.0	325.0
13	Vladimir Birsa (MDA)	B	75.55	142.5	~~147.5~~	147.5	147.5	175.0	~~182.5~~	~~182.5~~	175.0	322.5
14	Ilirjan Suli (ALB)	B	75.93	137.5	142.5	147.5	147.5	170.0	175.0	~~180.0~~	175.0	322.5
15	Satheesha Rai (IND)	C	75.53	~~135.0~~	135.0	140.0	140.0	170.0	177.5	~~180.0~~	177.5	317.5
16	Ilie Fǎtu (ROU)	B	75.09	135.0	~~142.5~~	~~142.5~~	135.0	175.0	180.0	~~185.0~~	180.0	315.0
17	Damian Brown (AUS)	C	75.91	135.0	140.0	~~145.0~~	140.0	175.0	~~180.0~~	~~180.0~~	175.0	315.0
18	Ofisa Ofisa (SAM)	C	75.87	120.0	127.5	~~132.5~~	127.5	160.0	~~167.5~~	~~167.5~~	160.0	287.5
19	Edward Silva (URU)	C	74.43	112.5	117.5	120.0	120.0	142.5	147.5	~~152.5~~	147.5	267.5
20	Quincy Detenamo (NRU)	C	75.97	100.0	105.0	110.0	110.0	137.5	~~142.5~~	142.5	142.5	252.5
21	Isnardo Faro (ARU)	C	75.95	102.5	107.5	112.5	112.5	132.5	137.5	~~142.5~~	137.5	250.0
	Khachatur Kyapanaktsyan (ARM)	A	75.53	157.5	162.5	165.0	165.0	~~192.5~~	~~192.5~~	~~195.0~~	–	–
	Bakhtiyar Nurullayev (UZB)	C	74.58	~~145.0~~	~~145.0~~	~~145.0~~	–	–	–	–	–	–
	Mehmet Yılmaz (TUR)	B	75.86	152.5	~~157.5~~	157.5	157.5	~~185.0~~	~~185.0~~	~~185.0~~	–	–

== Sources ==
- "Official Olympic Report". International Olympic Committee. Archived from the original on 12 June 2007.
