= Weightlifting at the 2000 Summer Olympics – Men's 77 kg =

Weightlifting at the Olympics

Men's 77 kg at the Games of the XXVII Olympiad
- Venue: Sydney Convention and Exhibition Centre
- Date: 22 September 2000
- Competitors: 18 from 16 nations

Medalists
1st place, gold medalist(s)		Zhan Xugang	China
2nd place, silver medalist(s)		Viktor Mitrou	Greece
3rd place, bronze medalist(s)		Arsen Melikyan	Armenia

The men's 77 kilograms weightlifting event at the 2000 Summer Olympics in Sydney, Australia took place at the Sydney Convention and Exhibition Centre on September 22.

Total score was the sum of the lifter's best result in each of the snatch and the clean and jerk, with three lifts allowed for each lift. In case of a tie, the lighter lifter won; if still tied, the lifter who took the fewest attempts to achieve the total score won. Lifters without a valid snatch score did not perform the clean and jerk.

== Schedule ==
All times are Australian Eastern Time (UTC+10:00)

Date	Time	Event
22 September 2000	10:30	Group B
22 September 2000	18:30	Group A

== Records ==
Prior to this competition, the existing world and Olympic records were as follows.

World Record	Snatch	Khachatur Kyapanaktsyan (ARM)	170.5 kg	Athens, Greece	25 November 1999
World Record	Clean & Jerk	Zlatan Vanev (BUL)	207.5 kg	Sofia, Bulgaria	28 April 2000
World Record	Total	World Standard	372.5 kg	—	1 January 1998
Olympic Record	Snatch	Olympic Standard	167.5 kg	—	1 January 1997
Olympic Record	Clean & Jerk	Olympic Standard	202.5 kg	—	1 January 1997
Olympic Record	Total	Olympic Standard	370.0 kg	—	1 January 1997

== Results ==
Rank	Athlete	Group	Body weight	Snatch (kg)				Clean & Jerk (kg)				Total
Rank	Athlete	Group	Body weight	1	2	3	Result	1	2	3	Result	Total
1st place, gold medalist(s)	Zhan Xugang (CHN)	A	76.20	160.0	~~165.0~~	~~165.0~~	160.0	202.5	207.5	—	207.5	367.5
2nd place, silver medalist(s)	Viktor Mitrou (GRE)	A	76.48	160.0	165.0	~~167.5~~	165.0	195.0	200.0	202.5	202.5	367.5
3rd place, bronze medalist(s)	Arsen Melikyan (ARM)	A	76.68	162.5	~~167.5~~	167.5	167.5	197.5	~~202.5~~	~~202.5~~	197.5	365.0
4	Sergey Filimonov (KAZ)	B	76.90	~~162.5~~	162.5	167.5	167.5	190.0	195.0	~~200.0~~	195.0	362.5
5	Ilirjan Suli (ALB)	A	76.66	162.5	~~167.5~~	~~167.5~~	162.5	192.5	~~200.0~~	—	192.5	355.0
6	Jon Chol-ho (PRK)	B	76.58	~~160.0~~	~~162.5~~	162.5	162.5	190.0	~~195.0~~	~~200.0~~	190.0	352.5
7	Ingo Steinhöfel (GER)	B	76.58	155.0	~~160.0~~	160.0	160.0	190.0	~~195.0~~	~~195.0~~	190.0	350.0
8	Dmytro Hnidenko (UKR)	A	76.58	160.0	~~165.0~~	~~165.0~~	160.0	190.0	~~195.0~~	—	190.0	350.0
9	Idalberto Aranda (CUB)	B	76.86	145.0	150.0	~~155.0~~	150.0	~~200.0~~	200.0	~~208.0~~	200.0	350.0
10	Mehmet Yılmaz (TUR)	B	76.60	~~155.0~~	155.0	160.0	160.0	180.0	187.5	~~192.5~~	187.5	347.5
11	Ruslan Savchenko (UKR)	B	76.90	150.0	157.5	~~162.5~~	157.5	180.0	~~185.0~~	~~185.0~~	180.0	337.5
12	Oscar Chaplin (USA)	B	76.84	150.0	~~155.0~~	155.0	155.0	180.0	~~190.0~~	~~190.0~~	180.0	335.0
13	Ayhan Çiçek (TUR)	B	76.88	140.0	145.0	~~150.0~~	145.0	175.0	180.0	~~185.0~~	180.0	325.0
14	Damian Brown (AUS)	B	76.80	~~145.0~~	145.0	~~150.0~~	145.0	~~170.0~~	170.0	175.0	175.0	320.0
15	Carlos Saurí (PUR)	B	76.92	140.0	~~145.0~~	~~145.0~~	140.0	~~165.0~~	~~165.0~~	165.0	165.0	305.0
16	Joseph Bellon (SLE)	B	76.48	90.0	92.5	95.0	95.0	100.0	102.5	105.0	105.0	200.0
—	Mohammad Hossein Barkhah (IRI)	A	76.16	~~157.5~~	~~157.5~~	~~160.0~~	—	—	—	—	—	—
—	Adrián Popa (HUN)	B	76.54	—	—	—	—	—	—	—	—	—

== New records ==
Clean & Jerk	207.5 kg	Zhan Xugang (CHN)	OR
