= 1994 World Weightlifting Championships =

World weightlifting championship

1994 World Championships
- Host city: Istanbul, Turkey
- Dates: November 17–27, 1994

The 1994 World Weightlifting Championships were held at the Abdi İpekçi Arena in Istanbul, Turkey from 17 to 27 November 1994.

== Medal summary ==
=== Men ===
Event	Gold		Silver		Bronze	
54 kg
Snatch	Halil Mutlu; Turkey	130.0 kg WR	William Vargas; Cuba	122.5 kg	Sevdalin Minchev; Bulgaria	122.5 kg
Clean & Jerk	Halil Mutlu; Turkey	160.0 kg WR	Ivan Ivanov; Bulgaria	155.0 kg	Lan Shizhang; China	150.0 kg
Total	Halil Mutlu; Turkey	290.0 kg WR	Ivan Ivanov; Bulgaria	275.0 kg	Sevdalin Minchev; Bulgaria	270.0 kg
59 kg
Snatch	Nikolay Peshalov; Bulgaria	135.0 kg	Hafız Süleymanoğlu; Turkey	135.0 kg	Radostin Panayotov; Bulgaria	130.0 kg
Clean & Jerk	Nikolay Peshalov; Bulgaria	168.0 kg WR	Hafız Süleymanoğlu; Turkey	162.5 kg	Chun Byung-kwan; South Korea	157.5 kg
Total	Nikolay Peshalov; Bulgaria	302.5 kg	Hafız Süleymanoğlu; Turkey	297.5 kg	Radostin Panayotov; Bulgaria	287.5 kg
64 kg
Snatch	Naim Süleymanoğlu; Turkey	147.5 kg WR	Valerios Leonidis; Greece	146.5 kg	Ilian Iliev; Bulgaria	142.5 kg
Clean & Jerk	Naim Süleymanoğlu; Turkey	182.5 kg WR	Valerios Leonidis; Greece	180.5 kg	Attila Czanka; Hungary	172.5 kg
Total	Naim Süleymanoğlu; Turkey	330.0 kg WR	Valerios Leonidis; Greece	325.0 kg	Attila Czanka; Hungary	312.5 kg
70 kg
Snatch	Fedail Güler; Turkey	160.0 kg WR	Angel Genchev; Bulgaria	155.0 kg	Ergün Batmaz; Turkey	155.0 kg
Clean & Jerk	Attila Feri; Hungary	190.0 kg	Fedail Güler; Turkey	190.0 kg	Yoto Yotov; Bulgaria	190.0 kg
Total	Fedail Güler; Turkey	350.0 kg WR	Yoto Yotov; Bulgaria	345.0 kg	Angel Genchev; Bulgaria	340.0 kg
76 kg
Snatch	Ingo Steinhöfel; Germany	165.0 kg	Roman Sevasteyev; Ukraine	162.5 kg	Leonid Lobachev; Belarus	162.5 kg
Clean & Jerk	Pablo Lara; Cuba	202.5 kg	Ruslan Savchenko; Ukraine	200.0 kg	Ingo Steinhöfel; Germany	197.5 kg
Total	Pablo Lara; Cuba	365.0 kg	Ingo Steinhöfel; Germany	362.5 kg	Ruslan Savchenko; Ukraine	360.0 kg
83 kg
Snatch	Sergo Chakhoyan; Armenia	175.5 kg WR	Marc Huster; Germany	172.5 kg	Pyrros Dimas; Greece	172.5 kg
Clean & Jerk	Marc Huster; Germany	210.0 kg	Sunay Bulut; Turkey	210.5 kg WR	Vadim Vacarciuc; Moldova	205.0 kg
Total	Marc Huster; Germany	382.5 kg WR	Sergo Chakhoyan; Armenia	380.0 kg	Sunay Bulut; Turkey	375.0 kg
91 kg
Snatch	Aleksey Petrov; Russia	186.0 kg WR	Ivan Chakarov; Bulgaria	185.0 kg	Akakios Kakiasvilis; Greece	177.5 kg
Clean & Jerk	Aleksey Petrov; Russia	228.0 kg WR	Akakios Kakiasvilis; Greece	220.0 kg	Viktor Belyatsky; Belarus	207.5 kg
Total	Aleksey Petrov; Russia	412.5 kg WR	Akakios Kakiasvilis; Greece	397.5 kg	Viktor Belyatsky; Belarus	380.0 kg
99 kg
Snatch	Sergey Syrtsov; Russia	192.5 kg WR	Viktor Tregubov; Russia	185.0 kg	Aghvan Grigoryan; Armenia	180.0 kg
Clean & Jerk	Sergey Syrtsov; Russia	225.5 kg WR	Viktor Tregubov; Russia	220.0 kg	Stanislav Rybalchenko; Ukraine	217.5 kg
Total	Sergey Syrtsov; Russia	417.5 kg WR	Viktor Tregubov; Russia	405.0 kg	Stanislav Rybalchenko; Ukraine	395.0 kg
108 kg
Snatch	Timur Taymazov; Ukraine	200.0 kg WR	Artur Akoyev; Russia	195.0 kg	Nicu Vlad; Australia	192.5 kg
Clean & Jerk	Timur Taymazov; Ukraine	235.5 kg WR	Nicu Vlad; Australia	230.0 kg	Artur Akoyev; Russia	225.0 kg
Total	Timur Taymazov; Ukraine	435.0 kg WR	Nicu Vlad; Australia	422.5 kg	Artur Akoyev; Russia	420.0 kg
+108 kg
Snatch	Aleksandr Kurlovich; Belarus	205.0 kg WR	Andrey Chemerkin; Russia	200.0 kg	Stefan Botev; Australia	195.0 kg
Clean & Jerk	Aleksandr Kurlovich; Belarus	253.0 kg WR	Andrey Chemerkin; Russia	252.5 kg	Stefan Botev; Australia	240.0 kg
Total	Aleksandr Kurlovich; Belarus	457.5 kg WR	Andrey Chemerkin; Russia	452.5 kg	Stefan Botev; Australia	435.0 kg

=== Women ===
Event	Gold		Silver		Bronze	
46 kg
Snatch	Yun Yanhong; China	80.5 kg WR	Kunjarani Devi; India	72.5 kg	Misasanga Wangkiree; Thailand	72.5 kg
Clean & Jerk	Yun Yanhong; China	100.0 kg	Kunjarani Devi; India	95.0 kg	Chu Nan-mei; Chinese Taipei	87.5 kg
Total	Yun Yanhong; China	180.0 kg	Kunjarani Devi; India	167.5 kg	Tsai Huey-woan; Chinese Taipei	155.0 kg
50 kg
Snatch	Robin Byrd; United States	80.0 kg	Chen Li-chuan; Chinese Taipei	75.0 kg	Siyka Stoeva; Bulgaria	75.0 kg
Clean & Jerk	Izabela Rifatova; Bulgaria	95.0 kg	Robin Byrd; United States	95.0 kg	Anna Stroubou; Greece	90.0 kg
Total	Robin Byrd; United States	175.0 kg	Izabela Rifatova; Bulgaria	165.0 kg	Chen Li-chuan; Chinese Taipei	165.0 kg
54 kg
Snatch	Li Fengying; China	87.5 kg	Janeta Georgieva; Bulgaria	87.5 kg	Karnam Malleswari; India	87.5 kg
Clean & Jerk	Karnam Malleswari; India	110.0 kg	Li Fengying; China	107.5 kg	Neli Yankova; Bulgaria	102.5 kg
Total	Karnam Malleswari; India	197.5 kg	Li Fengying; China	195.0 kg	Janeta Georgieva; Bulgaria	185.0 kg
59 kg
Snatch	Zou Feie; China	98.5 kg WR	Gergana Kirilova; Bulgaria	90.0 kg	Khassaraporn Suta; Thailand	85.0 kg
Clean & Jerk	Zou Feie; China	123.0 kg WR	Khassaraporn Suta; Thailand	112.5 kg	Gergana Kirilova; Bulgaria	112.5 kg
Total	Zou Feie; China	220.0 kg	Gergana Kirilova; Bulgaria	202.5 kg	Khassaraporn Suta; Thailand	197.5 kg
64 kg
Snatch	Li Hongyun; China	105.0 kg WR	Erzsébet Márkus; Hungary	92.5 kg	Kuo Shu-fen; Chinese Taipei	90.0 kg
Clean & Jerk	Li Hongyun; China	130.0 kg WR	Kuo Shu-fen; Chinese Taipei	115.0 kg	Alexia Papageorgiou; Greece	110.0 kg
Total	Li Hongyun; China	235.0 kg WR	Kuo Shu-fen; Chinese Taipei	205.0 kg	Erzsébet Márkus; Hungary	197.5 kg
70 kg
Snatch	Qu Lihua; China	97.5 kg	Wasana Putcharkarn; Thailand	95.0 kg	Zhou Meihong; China	95.0 kg
Clean & Jerk	Zhou Meihong; China	128.5 kg WR	Qu Lihua; China	122.5 kg	Irina Kasimova; Russia	117.5 kg
Total	Zhou Meihong; China	222.5 kg	Qu Lihua; China	220.0 kg	Wasana Putcharkarn; Thailand	210.0 kg
76 kg
Snatch	Albina Khomich; Russia	97.5 kg	Mária Takács; Hungary	95.0 kg	Ruth Ogbeifo; Nigeria	95.0 kg
Clean & Jerk	Panagiota Antonopoulou; Greece	127.5 kg	Mária Takács; Hungary	122.5 kg	Ruth Ogbeifo; Nigeria	115.0 kg
Total	Panagiota Antonopoulou; Greece	220.0 kg	Mária Takács; Hungary	217.5 kg	Albina Khomich; Russia	212.5 kg
83 kg
Snatch	María Isabel Urrutia; Colombia	105.0 kg	Chen Shu-chih; Chinese Taipei	105.0 kg	Derya Açikgöz; Turkey	100.0 kg
Clean & Jerk	María Isabel Urrutia; Colombia	132.5 kg WR	Chen Shu-chih; Chinese Taipei	130.5 kg	Derya Açikgöz; Turkey	120.0 kg
Total	María Isabel Urrutia; Colombia	237.5 kg	Chen Shu-chih; Chinese Taipei	235.0 kg	Derya Açikgöz; Turkey	220.0 kg
+83 kg
Snatch	Karoliina Lundahl; Finland	102.5 kg	Myrtle Augee; Great Britain	97.5 kg	Chen Hsiao-lien; Chinese Taipei	95.0 kg
Clean & Jerk	Karoliina Lundahl; Finland	127.5 kg	Chen Hsiao-lien; Chinese Taipei	122.5 kg	Myrtle Augee; Great Britain	120.0 kg
Total	Karoliina Lundahl; Finland	230.0 kg	Chen Hsiao-lien; Chinese Taipei	217.5 kg	Myrtle Augee; Great Britain	217.5 kg

== Medal table ==
Ranking by Big (Total result) medals

Rank	Nation	Gold	Silver	Bronze	Total
1	China	4	2	0	6
2	Turkey	3	1	2	6
3	Russia	2	2	2	6
4	Bulgaria	1	4	4	9
5	Greece	1	2	0	3
6	Germany	1	1	0	2
6	India	1	1	0	2
8	Ukraine	1	0	2	3
9	Belarus	1	0	1	2
10	Colombia	1	0	0	1
10	Cuba	1	0	0	1
10	Finland	1	0	0	1
10	United States	1	0	0	1
14	Chinese Taipei	0	3	2	5
15	Hungary	0	1	2	3
16	Australia	0	1	1	2
17	Armenia	0	1	0	1
18	Thailand	0	0	2	2
19	Great Britain	0	0	1	1
Totals (19 entries)		19	19	19	57

Ranking by all medals: Big (Total result) and Small (Snatch and Clean & Jerk)

Rank	Nation	Gold	Silver	Bronze	Total
1	China	13	4	2	19
2	Turkey	8	5	5	18
3	Russia	7	7	4	18
4	Bulgaria	4	9	11	24
5	Ukraine	3	2	3	8
6	Germany	3	2	1	6
7	Belarus	3	0	3	6
8	Colombia	3	0	0	3
8	Finland	3	0	0	3
10	Greece	2	5	4	11
11	India	2	3	1	6
12	Cuba	2	1	0	3
12	United States	2	1	0	3
14	Hungary	1	4	3	8
15	Armenia	1	1	1	3
16	Chinese Taipei	0	8	5	13
17	Australia	0	2	4	6
17	Thailand	0	2	4	6
19	Great Britain	0	1	2	3
20	Nigeria	0	0	2	2
21	Moldova	0	0	1	1
21	South Korea	0	0	1	1
Totals (22 entries)		57	57	57	171
