= Maslany =

Maślany (female: Maślana) is a Polish surname, derived from the nickname that literally means "buttery, made of butter" or figuratively "clumsy person". Notable people with the surname include:

- Daniel Maslany, Canadian actor
- Marek Maślany (born 1966), Polish weightlifter
- Tatiana Maslany (born 1985), Canadian actress

== Fictional characters ==
- Maślana, Włatcy móch character
