= Charlie Depthios =

Indonesian weightlifter (1940–1999)

Personal information
- Full name: Charles Depthios
- Nationality: Indonesian
- Born: 2 February 1940 Mamuju, Indonesia
- Died: 4 September 1999 (aged 59)

Sport
- Sport: Weightlifting
- Coached by: Santoso Gunawan

Charlie Depthios (2 February 1940 – 4 September 1999) was an Indonesian weightlifter. He competed at the 1968 Summer Olympics and the 1972 Summer Olympics.

His son Enosh Depthios is also an Olympic weightlifter.
