= 1998 European Weightlifting Championships =

International weightlifting competition

1998 European Championships

The 1998 European Weightlifting Championships were held in Riesa, Germany in April 1998. It was the 77th edition of the European Weightlifting Championships. There were a total number of 144 competing athletes from 29 nations.

== Medal overview ==
=== Men ===
Event	Gold	Silver	Bronze
– 56 kg	(Bulgaria) Ivan Ivanov	(Turkey) Sedat Artuç	(Bulgaria) Nayden Rusev
– 62 kg	(Bulgaria) Stefan Georgiev	(Greece) Leonidas Sabanis	(Turkey) Mücahit Yağcı
– 69 kg	(Bulgaria) Plamen Zhelyazkov	(Turkey) Ergün Batmaz	(Belarus) Sergey Lavrenov
– 77 kg	(Bulgaria) Zlatan Vanev	(Georgia (country)) Giorgi Asanidze	(Armenia) Khachatur Kyapanaktsyan
– 85 kg	(Germany) Marc Huster	(Greece) Pyrros Dimas	(Turkey) Dursun Sevinç
– 94 kg	(Germany) Oliver Caruso	(Bulgaria) Ivan Chakarov	(Greece) Kakhi Kakhiashvili
– 105 kg	(Russia) Viacheslav Ivanovski	(Russia) Evgeny Chichliannikov	(Poland) Dariusz Osuch
+ 105 kg	(Germany) Ronny Weller	(Russia) Andrei Chemerkin	(Armenia) Ara Vardanyan

=== Women ===
Event	Gold	Silver	Bronze
– 48 kg	(Bulgaria) Donka Mincheva	(Bulgaria) Siyka Stoyeva	(Hungary) Aniko Ajkai
– 53 kg	(Bulgaria) Izabela Dragneva	(Slovakia) Dagmar Daneková	(Greece) Anna Stroubou
– 58 kg	(Bulgaria) Neli Simova	(Poland) Dominika Misterska	(Greece) Maria Christoforidou
– 63 kg	(Bulgaria) Gergana Kirilova	(Russia) Valentina Popova	(Spain) Josefa Pérez
– 69 kg	(Hungary) Erzsébet Márkus	(Russia) Svetlana Kabirova	(Poland) Beata Prei
– 75 kg	(Hungary) Mária Takács	(Hungary) Ilona Danko	(Spain) Mónica Carrio
+ 75 kg	(Germany) Monique Riesterer	(Hungary) Erika Takács	(Poland) Agata Wróbel
