= Weightlifting at the 1996 Summer Olympics – Men's 91 kg =

Weightlifting at the Olympics

Men's 91 kg at the Games of the XXVI Olympiad
- Venue: Georgia World Congress Center
- Date: 27 July 1996
- Competitors: 25 from 22 nations
- Winning total: 402.5 kg

Medalists
1st place, gold medalist(s)		Aleksei Petrov	Russia
2nd place, silver medalist(s)		Leonidas Kokas	Greece
3rd place, bronze medalist(s)		Oliver Caruso	Germany

These are the results of the men's 91 kg competition in weightlifting at the 1996 Summer Olympics in Atlanta. A total of 25 athletes entered this event. Each weightlifter had three attempts for both the snatch and clean and jerk lifting methods. The total of the best successful lift of each method was used to determine the final rankings and medal winners. The weightlifter from Russia won the gold, with a combined lift of 402.5 kg.

== Results ==
Rank	Athlete	Group	Body weight	Snatch (kg)				Clean & Jerk (kg)				Total
Rank	Athlete	Group	Body weight	1	2	3	Result	1	2	3	Result	Total
1st place, gold medalist(s)	Aleksei Petrov (RUS)	A	90.89	175.0	182.5	187.5	187.5	215.0	~~227.5~~	~~227.5~~	215.0	402.5
2nd place, silver medalist(s)	Leonidas Kokas (GRE)	A	89.28	~~170.0~~	170.0	175.0	175.0	212.5	~~215.0~~	215.0	215.0	390.0
3rd place, bronze medalist(s)	Oliver Caruso (GER)	A	90.65	170.0	175.0	~~177.5~~	175.0	205.0	215.0	–	215.0	390.0
4	Sunay Bulut (TUR)	A	90.82	170.0	175.0	177.5	177.5	~~210.0~~	~~210.0~~	212.5	212.5	390.0
5	Igor Alekseyev (RUS)	A	90.50	~~175.0~~	175.0	182.5	182.5	205.0	~~212.5~~	~~212.5~~	205.0	387.5
6	Carlos Alexis Hernández (CUB)	A	90.87	170.0	175.0	~~180.0~~	175.0	202.5	207.5	~~212.5~~	207.5	382.5
7	Oleh Chumak (UKR)	A	89.46	167.5	~~172.5~~	~~172.5~~	167.5	202.5	207.5	212.5	212.5	380.0
8	Plamen Bratoychev (BUL)	A	90.93	~~170.0~~	170.0	175.0	175.0	202.5	205.0	~~207.5~~	205.0	380.0
9	Julio César Luña (VEN)	B	90.28	160.0	165.0	~~167.5~~	165.0	202.5	207.5	210.0	210.0	375.0
10	Martin Tešovič (SVK)	B	90.39	162.5	~~167.5~~	~~167.5~~	162.5	205.0	~~210.0~~	210.0	210.0	372.5
11	Marek Maślany (POL)	B	90.63	160.0	~~165.0~~	165.0	165.0	200.0	205.0	~~210.0~~	205.0	370.0
12	Enrique Sabari (CUB)	A	90.72	155.0	162.5	165.0	165.0	195.0	205.0	~~212.5~~	205.0	370.0
13	Aleksander Karapetyan (ARM)	A	90.25	~~167.5~~	167.5	~~172.5~~	167.5	200.0	~~207.5~~	~~207.5~~	200.0	367.5
14	Tom Gough (USA)	B	90.92	162.5	~~167.5~~	167.5	167.5	200.0	~~205.0~~	~~205.0~~	200.0	367.5
15	Vladimir Khlud (BLR)	B	90.05	160.0	165.0	~~167.5~~	165.0	~~195.0~~	~~195.0~~	195.0	195.0	360.0
16	Harvey Goodman (AUS)	B	89.94	157.5	~~162.5~~	~~162.5~~	157.5	192.5	200.0	~~205.0~~	200.0	357.5
17	Viktor Belyatsky (BLR)	A	90.56	~~167.5~~	~~167.5~~	167.5	167.5	~~190.0~~	190.0	~~195.0~~	190.0	357.5
18	Andrey Makarov (KAZ)	A	86.58	165.0	~~170.0~~	~~170.0~~	165.0	~~190.0~~	190.0	~~195.0~~	190.0	355.0
19	Cédric Plançon (FRA)	B	87.56	155.0	~~160.0~~	~~160.0~~	155.0	185.0	~~190.0~~	190.0	190.0	345.0
20	Im Dong-gi (KOR)	B	89.82	~~150.0~~	150.0	155.0	155.0	190.0	~~200.0~~	~~200.0~~	190.0	345.0
21	Raffaele Mancino (ITA)	B	90.21	150.0	~~157.5~~	160.0	160.0	170.0	~~180.0~~	180.0	180.0	340.0
22	Eric Brown (ASA)	B	90.05	145.0	150.0	~~155.0~~	150.0	~~180.0~~	180.0	~~185.0~~	180.0	330.0
23	Ramūnas Vyšniauskas (LTU)	B	90.35	~~140.0~~	140.0	~~150.0~~	140.0	170.0	175.0	~~182.5~~	175.0	315.0
24	Gerard Garabwan (NRU)	B	90.87	110.0	115.0	~~120.0~~	115.0	150.0	~~157.5~~	~~157.5~~	150.0	265.0
	Viliami Tapaatoutai (TGA)	B	88.67	100.0	~~105.0~~	105.0	105.0	~~135.0~~	~~140.0~~	~~140.0~~	–	–

== Sources ==
- "Official Olympic Report". International Olympic Committee. Archived from the original on 12 June 2007.
