= Kim Myong-sik =

Kim Myong-sik may refer to:

- Kim Myong-sik (weightlifter) (born 1969), North Korean weightlifter
- Kim Myong-sik (politician), North Korean officer, commander of the Korean People's Navy
