= Abdel Monaim Yahiaoui =

Algerian weightlifter

Personal information
- Nationality: Algerian
- Born: 6 December 1966 (age 59)

Sport
- Sport: Weightlifting
Medal record
Mediterranean Games
Gold medal – first place	1991 Athens	67 kg S
Gold medal – first place	1993 Languedoc	70 kg C
Gold medal – first place	1993 Languedoc	70 kg T
Silver medal – second place	1991 Athens	67 kg T
Silver medal – second place	1993 Languedoc	70 kg S
Silver medal – second place	1997 Bari	70 kg C
Bronze medal – third place	1991 Athens	67 kg C
Bronze medal – third place	1997 Bari	70 kg S

Abdel Monaim Yahiaoui (born 6 December 1966) is an Algerian weightlifter. He competed at the 1992 Summer Olympics and the 1996 Summer Olympics.
