= Kim Byung-chan =

South Korean weightlifter (1970–2015)

Kim Byung-Chan
Personal information
- Born: 27 December 1970
- Died: 25 June 2015 (aged 44)
- Height: 176 cm (5 ft 9 in)
- Weight: 78 kg (172 lb)

Sport
- Country: South Korea
- Sport: Weightlifting
- Weight class: 90 kg
- Team: National team
Medal record
Men's Weightlifting
Representing South Korea
World Championships
Bronze medal – third place	1990 Budapest	90 kg
Bronze medal – third place	1991 Donaueschingen	90 kg
- Updated on 7 October 2016

Kim Byung-Chan (Korean: 김병찬, 27 December 1970 – 25 June 2015) was a South Korean male weightlifter, who competed in the middleweight and middle heavyweight class, representing South Korea at international competitions. He won the bronze medal at the 1991 World Weightlifting Championships in the 90 kg category. He participated at the 1988 Summer Olympics and at the 1992 Summer Olympics in the 90 kg event. He won the gold medal at the 1990 Asian Games in the Middle-Heavyweight class.
