= Hovhannes Barseghyan =

Armenian weightlifter (born 1970)

Medal record

Men's weightlifting

Representing Armenia

European Championships
Bronze medal – third place	1995 Warsaw	-76 kg

Hovhannes Barseghyan (Armenian: Հովհաննէս Բարսեղյան, born February 11, 1970, in Leninakan, Armenian SSR), also known as Hovhannes Barsegian or Oganes Barsegyan, is an Armenian retired weightlifter. He competed at the 1996 Summer Olympics in the men's 76 kg division. Barseghyan also won a bronze medal at the 1995 European Weightlifting Championships.
