= Anders Lindsjö =

Swedish weightlifter

Personal information
- Nationality: Swedish
- Born: 29 August 1969 (age 55); Helsingborg, Sweden

Sport
- Sport: Weightlifting

Anders Lindsjö (born 29 August 1969) is a Swedish weightlifter. He competed in the men's heavyweight II event at the 1992 Summer Olympics.
