= Sergo Chakhoyan =

Armenian weightlifter (born 1969)

Medal record

Men's Weightlifting

Representing Armenia

European Championships
Bronze medal – third place	Snatch	1993 Sofia
Bronze medal – third place	Clean & Jerk	1993 Sofia

World Championships
Gold medal – first place	Snatch	1994 Istanbul
Bronze medal – third place	Clean & Jerk	1994 Istanbul
Silver medal – second place	1994 Istanbul	-83 kg
Bronze medal – third place	Snatch	1995 Guangzhou

Representing Australia

World Championships
Gold medal – first place	Snatch	2003 Vancouver
Bronze medal – third place	Clean & Jerk	2003 Vancouver
Bronze medal – third place	2003 Vancouver	-85 kg

Goodwill Games
Gold medal – first place	Snatch	2001 Brisbane
Gold medal – first place	Clean & Jerk	2001 Brisbane
Gold medal – first place	2001 Brisbane	-85 kg

Australian Games
Gold medal – first place	Snatch	2005
Gold medal – first place	Clean & Jerk2005	-85 kg
Gold medal – first place	2005	-85 kg

Sergo Chakhoyan (Armenian: Սերգո Չախոյան, born 9 December 1969 in Leninakan, Armenian SSR) is an Armenian weightlifter who later represented Australia.

== Biography ==
Sergo Chakhoyan was born in Leninakan, Armenian SSR] (now Gyumri, Armenia) where many famous weightlifters come from. [1] He was national champion of Armenia multiple times, and is also a record holder. He won the silver medal in the 1994 World Weightlifting Championships, and also set a world record in the snatch, and in the clean and jerk with 175.5 kg. He became the second Armenian weightlifter after Israel Militosyan to set a world record. Chakhoyan participated in the 1995 World Championships and won the bronze medal in the snatch. He also participated in Atlanta Summer Olympics 1996, where he took the sixth place in the bout.

Starting in 1997, he started performing under the Australian flag. He is a four-time Australian champion and is also a record holder in Australia and Oceania. In 1999 he took part in the World Championship and took the 10th place at the event. Chakhoyan re-occupied the sixth place in the Sydney 2000 Summer Olympics. He broke the Australian record in the snatch, with 175 kg he earned 202.5 kg in clean & jerk. He finished sixth place again. He won 3 gold medals at the 2001 Goodwill Games in Brisbane, and gained two world and one Australian record at the Goodwill Games. His world record for snatch was 181.5 kg, push for Australian record, 210 kg and world record for double world record, 391.5 kg. In 2003 he participated in the Russian championship in the snatch, setting a world record of 182.5 kilograms, and the world record at 392.5 kg for the double. He won the bronze medal at the 2003 World Weightlifting Championships. He won the gold medal in the snatch.

Chakhonyan pulled 175.0 kg of muscle while lifting his first attempt at the 2004 Summer Olympics. The second approach raises 175 kg and occupies the 4th place. He tried to lift 207.5 kilograms in the snatch, by which he would win the Olympic Gold Medal. Nevertheless, he was unable to raise the stroke and get out of the fight 0:

In 2005 he became Australian and Oceania champion. During the training, he was ill and used aspirin, for which he was not allowed to participate in the 2005 World Cup in Qatar. In 2007 he was caught doping, using benzyl-pepelz, and he was disqualified.
