= Boxing at the 1993 Mediterranean Games =

Boxing competition

- Location: Narbonne, France
- Dates: 16–27 June 1993

The boxing events of the 1993 Mediterranean Games were held in Languedoc-Roussillon, France.

== Medalists ==
Event	Gold	Silver	Bronze
Light Flyweight (–48 kg)	Rachid Bouaita (FRA)	Rafael Lozano (ESP)	Hamid Berhili (MAR) Mohamed Haioun (ALG)
Flyweight (–51 kg)	Moustafa Esmail (EGY)	Abdellah Kouzibra (MAR)	Panagiotis Tsamis (GRE) David Guerault (FRA)
Bantamweight (–54 kg)	İlhan Güler (TUR)	Agathangelos Tsiripidis (GRE)	Hamed Halbouni (SYR) Riadh Klai (TUN)
Featherweight (–57 kg)	Vahdettin İşsever (TUR)	Giovanni Giungato (ITA)	Ahmed M'Delli (TUN) Claude Chinon (FRA)
Lightweight (–60 kg)	Kamal Marjouan (MAR)	Hocine Soltani (ALG)	Ali Trabelsi (TUN) Bruno Wartelle (FRA)
Light Welterweight (–63.5 kg)	Nurhan Süleymanoğlu (TUR)	Laureano Leiva (ESP)	Nordine Mouchi (FRA) Abdellah Ben Biar (MAR)
Welterweight (–67 kg)	Stephane Cazeaux (FRA)	Kenan Öner (TUR)	Víctor Baute (ESP) Kamel Chater (TUN)
Light Middleweight (–71 kg)	Almedin Fetahović (BIH)	Malik Beyleroğlu (TUR)	Aly Aly Abdel Latif (EGY) Ghiath Tayfour (SYR)
Middleweight (–75 kg)	Akın Kuloğlu (TUR)	Mohamed Lassoued (TUN)	Ahmed Dine (ALG) Ioannis Kokolis (GRE)
Light Heavyweight (–81 kg)	Sinan Şamil Sam (TUR)	Kyparissos Vasilikos (GRE)	Mohamed Benguesmia (ALG) Giacobbe Fragomeni (ITA)
Heavyweight (–91 kg)	Georgios Stefanopoulos (GRE)	Stephane Allouane (FRA)	Ahmed Sarir (MAR) Fikret Güneş (TUR)
Super Heavyweight (+91 kg)	Christophe Mendy (FRA)	Ahmed El-Said (EGY)	Pero Šakota (CRO) Paolo Vidoz (ITA)

== Medal table ==
Rank	Nation	Gold	Silver	Bronze	Total
1	Turkey (TUR)	5	2	1	8
2	France (FRA)	3	1	4	8
3	Greece (GRE)	1	2	2	5
4	Morocco (MAR)	1	1	3	5
5	Egypt (EGY)	1	1	1	3
6	Bosnia and Herzegovina (BIH)	1	0	0	1
7	Spain (ESP)	0	2	1	3
8	Tunisia (TUN)	0	1	4	5
9	Algeria (ALG)	0	1	3	4
10	Italy (ITA)	0	1	2	3
11	Syria (SYR)	0	0	2	2
12	Croatia (CRO)	0	0	1	1
Totals (12 entries)		12	12	24	48
