= Italy at the 1997 Mediterranean Games =

- IOC code: ITA
- NOC: Italian National Olympic Committee

in Bari
- Competitors: 410 in 27 sports
- Medals Ranked 1st: Gold 76 Silver 62 Bronze 55 Total 193

Mediterranean Games appearances (overview)
- 1951; 1955; 1959; 1963; 1967; 1971; 1975; 1979; 1983; 1987; 1991; 1993; 1997; 2001; 2005; 2009; 2013; 2018; 2022

Italy competed at the 1997 Mediterranean Games in Bari, Italy.

== Medals ==
| Sport | Gold | Silver | Bronze | Total |
|---|---|---|---|---|
| Swimming | 16 | 7 | 8 | 31 |
| Athletics | 6 | 5 | 5 | 16 |
| Karate | 6 | 0 | 1 | 7 |
| Shooting | 5 | 6 | 2 | 13 |
| Canoeing | 5 | 5 | 2 | 12 |
| Judo | 5 | 2 | 5 | 12 |
| Boxing | 5 | 2 | 1 | 8 |
| Fencing | 3 | 3 | 1 | 7 |
| Tennis | 3 | 2 | 0 | 5 |
| Gymnastics | 2 | 4 | 7 | 13 |
| Rowing | 2 | 2 | 2 | 6 |
| Sailing | 2 | 2 | 1 | 5 |
| Golf | 2 | 1 | 2 | 5 |
| Cycling | 2 | 0 | 1 | 3 |
| Wrestling | 1 | 2 | 2 | 5 |
| Boules | 1 | 1 | 1 | 3 |
| Table tennis | 1 | 1 | 0 | 2 |
| Football | 1 | 0 | 0 | 1 |
| Volleyball | 1 | 0 | 0 | 1 |
| Weightlifting | 0 | 3 | 3 | 6 |
| Archery | 0 | 2 | 0 | 2 |
| Equestrian | 0 | 2 | 0 | 2 |
| Basketball | 0 | 1 | 0 | 1 |
| Handball | 0 | 1 | 0 | 1 |
| Totals (24 entries) | 69 | 54 | 44 | 167 |

== See also ==
- Boxing at the 1997 Mediterranean Games
- Football at the 1997 Mediterranean Games
- Judo at the 1997 Mediterranean Games
- Volleyball at the 1997 Mediterranean Games
- Water polo at the 1997 Mediterranean Games
