= Viliami Tapaatoutai =

Tongan weightlifter

Personal information
- Nationality: Tongan
- Born: 21 October 1972 (age 52)

Sport
- Sport: Weightlifting

Viliami Tapaatoutai (born 21 October 1972) is a Tongan weightlifter. He competed in the men's middle heavyweight event at the 1996 Summer Olympics.
