= Raffaele Mancino =

Italian weightlifter

Personal information
- Nationality: Italian
- Born: 8 December 1965 (age 59); Casarsa della Delizia, Italy

Sport
- Sport: Weightlifting

Raffaele Mancino (born 8 December 1965) is an Italian weightlifter. He competed in the men's middle heavyweight event at the 1996 Summer Olympics.
