= Ghiath Tayfour =

Syrian boxer

Medal record
Men's Boxing
Representing Syria
Mediterranean Games
Gold medal – first place	1991 Athens	71 kg
Bronze medal – third place	1993 Languedoc	71 kg
Asian Games
Bronze medal – third place	1994 Hiroshima	71 kg

Ghiath Tayfour (in Arabic غياث طيفور 1969 – 11 March 2012) was a Syrian boxing champion in Syria and winner of many titles including Syrian championship titles from 1984 to 1998. He was born in Aleppo, Syria, and began his training with the Police Club of Aleppo.

Tayfour was assassinated in front of the University of Aleppo. Opposition forces to the government of Bashar al-Assad claimed responsibility for his murder, alleging "his involvement in the government's security apparatus against the protesters during Syrian Civil War". He had reportedly received death threats earlier. At the time of his death, Tayfour was an administrator in the Department of Sports Facilities in Aleppo, Syria. He was also a member of the Syrian Boxing Federation and a boxing trainer in the Aleppo Police Club, where he first learned to box.

== Medals ==
- 1990 - Bronze at the Istanbul International Tournament
- 1991 - Gold at the Mediterranean Championships
- 1992 - Gold at the 10th Arab Championships
- 1993 - Silver at the Slovakian Tournament
- 1995 - Gold at Egypt International Tournament
- 1995 - Bronze at the Arab Championships
- 1996 - Bronze at the Dagestan Tournament
- 1997 - Silver at the Dagestan Tournament
- 1997 - Silver at the Bosphorus International Tournament
- 1993 - Bronze Mediterranean Championships in France
- 1994 - Bronze in Asian Games
- 1997 - Bronze at the Iranian International Tournament
- 1999 - Gold at the King Hussein Tournament in Jordan
- 1999 - Gold at the Istanbul International Tournament
- 1999 - Gold at the Iranian International Tournament
