= Vyacheslav Ivanovsky =

Russian weightlifter

Vyacheslav Ivanovskiy
Personal information
- Native name: Вячеслав Ивановский
- Born: August 14, 1975 (age 51) Novosibirsk, Soviet Union
- Weight: 218 lb (99 kg)

Sport
- Country: Russia
- Sport: Weightlifting
- Weight class: Heavyweight
Medal record
Men's weightlifting
Representing Russia
European Championships
Gold medal – first place	1998 Riesa	– 105 kg

Vyacheslav Ivanovsky (Russian: Вячеслав Ивановский; born August 14, 1975, Russia, Novosibirsk) is a Russian former Olympic weightlifter.

== Weightlifting career ==
Ivanovskiy won the silver medal at the 1995 Junior European Weightlifting Championships in Beer Sheva, Israel, in the Sub-Heavyweight class (lifting 370.0 kg). He won the bronze medal at the 1996 European Weightlifting Championships, in the Sub-Heavyweight class (lifting 377.5 kg).

Ivanovskiy competed for Israel at the 1996 Summer Olympics in the Georgia World Congress Center in Atlanta, at the age of 20, in Weightlifting-Men's Heavyweight I (99 kg). He did not complete a lift in the snatch at 175.0 kg, and did not finish. When he competed in the Olympics, he weighed 218 lbs (99 kg).

He won the gold medal in the 1998 European Weightlifting Championships, in the Heavyweight class (lifting 402.5 kg). Ivanovskiy came in 4th at the 1999 European Weightlifting Championships in Spain in the 105 kg class, with a total lift of 402.5 kg.

Ivanovskiy came in 6th at the 2001 World Weightlifting Championships in Turkey in the 105 kg class, with a total lift of 438.7 kg. He came in 4th in the 2002 World Weightlifting Championships in Poland in the 105 kg class, with a total lift of 441.4.
