= Nail Mukhamedyarov =

Soviet weightlifter

Personal information
- Born: November 8, 1962 (age 63) Leninsk, Andijan Region, Uzbek SSR, Soviet Union
Medal record
Men's Weightlifting
Representing Soviet Union
Olympic Games
Silver medal – second place	1988 Seoul	-90 kg
World Championships
Silver medal – second place	1990 Budapest	-110 kg

Nail Narimanovich Mukhamedyarov (Russian: Наиль Нариманович Мухамедьяров) is a Soviet weightlifter. He won a Silver medal in the 90 kg class at the 1988 Summer Olympics in Seoul. Mukhamedyarov also won a Silver medal in the 110 kg class at the 1990 World Weightlifting Championships in Budapest.
