= Cai Jun =

Chinese weightlifter (born 1971)

Medal record

Women's weightlifting

Representing China

World Championships
Gold medal – first place	1987 Daytona Beach	–44 kg
Gold medal – first place	1990 Sarajevo	–48 kg

Cai Jun (Chinese: 蔡军; born 14 March 1971) is a Chinese weightlifter and the first female world champion in the history of the sport. In 1987 while only sixteen years of age, she won the first category at the inaugural women's World Championships in Daytona Beach, USA.
