= Flavio Villavicencio =

Cuban weightlifter (born 1964)

Personal information
- Nationality: Cuban
- Born: 9 December 1964 (age 61)

Sport
- Sport: Weightlifting

Flavio Villavicencio (born 9 December 1964) is a Cuban weightlifter. He competed in the men's heavyweight II event at the 1992 Summer Olympics.
