= Abdulaziz Alpak =

Turkish weightlifter (born 1975)

Abdul Aziz Alpak
Personal information
- Full name: Abdul Aziz Alpak
- Nationality: Turkey
- Born: 23 April 1975 (age 51) Turkey
- Height: 180 cm (5 ft 11 in)
- Weight: 103.76 kg (229 lb)

Sport
- Sport: Weightlifting
- Weight class: –105 kg
Medal record
Men’s weightlifting
Representing Turkey
Mediterranean Games
| Gold medal – first place | 2001 Tunis | –105 kg S |
| Gold medal – first place | 2001 Tunis | –105 kg C&J |

Abdul Aziz Alpak (born 23 April 1975) is a Turkish weightlifter who competed in the –105 kg category. He represented Turkey at the 2000 Summer Olympics in Sydney, and later took part in the 2001 World Weightlifting Championships in Antalya.

== Career ==
At the 2001 Mediterranean Games in Tunis, he won two gold medals – one in the snatch and one in the clean & jerk events.

== Major results ==
| Year | Venue | Weight | Snatch (kg) | | | | Clean & Jerk (kg) | | | | Total | Rank |
| Year | Venue | Weight | 1 | 2 | 3 | Rank | 1 | 2 | 3 | Rank | Total | Rank |
Olympic Games
| 2000 | Sydney, Australia | 105 kg | — | — | — | — | — | — | — | — | — | DNF |
World Weightlifting Championships
| 2001 | Antalya, Turkey | 105 kg | ~~185~~ | ~~185~~ | — | — | — | — | — | — | 0 | — |
| 1999 | Piraeus, Greece | 105 kg | 170 | 175 | 180 | 10 | 215 | 222.5 | ~~227.5~~ | 4 | 402.5 | 9 |
| 1998 | Lahti, Finland | 105 kg | 165 | ~~175~~ | ~~175~~ | 17 | ~~205~~ | 205 | 215 | 8 | 380 | 11 |
