= Azzedine Basbas =

Algerian weightlifter

Personal information
- Nationality: Algerian
- Born: 30 January 1967 (age 59)

Sport
- Sport: Weightlifting
Medal record
Mediterranean Games
Bronze medal – third place	1993 Languedoc	64 kg S
Bronze medal – third place	1993 Languedoc	64 kg C
Bronze medal – third place	1993 Languedoc	64 kg T

Azzedine Basbas (born 30 January 1967) is an Algerian weightlifter. He competed at the 1988 Summer Olympics, the 1992 Summer Olympics and the 1996 Summer Olympics.
