= Igor Sadykov =

Soviet weightlifter

Personal information
- Nationality: Soviet Union; Germany
- Born: 23 July 1967 (age 59) Osh, Kirghiz SSR, Soviet Union
- Height: 178 cm (5 ft 10 in)
- Weight: 98 kg (216 lb)

Sport
- Country: Soviet Union (-1992); Germany(1993-)
- Sport: Weightlifting
- Weight class: 100 kg
- Club: Chemnitzer AC, Chemnitz (GER)
- Team: National team
Medal record
Men's Weightlifting
Representing Soviet Union
World Championships
Gold medal – first place	1991 Donaueschingen	100 kg
Silver medal – second place	1990 Budapest	100 kg
Representing Germany
World Championships
Bronze medal – third place	1993 Melbourne	100 kg
- Updated on 7 October 2016

Igor Sadykov (born 23 July 1967 in Osh) is a Soviet and German male former weightlifter, who competed in the first heavyweight class. He represented the Soviet Union until 1992 and Germany from 1993 at international competitions. He won the gold medal at the 1991 World Weightlifting Championships after winning silver at the 1990 World Weightlifting Championships. For Germany he won the bronze medal at the 1993 World Weightlifting Championships He participated at the 1996 Summer Olympics in the 99 kg event. He won the gold medal at the 1991 European Championships in the Sub-Heavyweight.
