= Atsushi Irei =

Japanese weightlifter

Personal information
- Nationality: Japanese
- Born: 3 January 1967 (age 58); Okinawa, Japan
- Height: 161 cm (5 ft 3 in)
- Weight: 58 kg (128 lb)

Sport
- Sport: Weightlifting

Atsushi Irei (Japanese: 伊禮淳, born 3 January 1967) is a Japanese weightlifter. He competed in the men's flyweight event at the 1992 Summer Olympics.
