= Im Dong-gi =

South Korean weightlifter

Personal information
- Nationality: South Korean
- Born: 7 July 1971 (age 53)

Sport
- Sport: Weightlifting

Im Dong-gi (born 7 July 1971) is a South Korean weightlifter. He competed in the men's middle heavyweight event at the 1996 Summer Olympics.
