= Kim Yong-su (weightlifter) =

North Korean weightlifter (born 1965)

Personal information
- Born: 1965 (age 60–61)

Sport
- Sport: Weightlifting
Medal record
Representing North Korea
World Championships
Silver medal – second place	1990 Budapest	-60 kg

Kim Yong-su (born 1965) is a retired North Korean weightlifter. He won a silver medal at the 1990 World Championships, placing fourth-sixth in 1985, 1986 and 1989. He finished seventh at the 1992 Summer Olympics.
