= Frank Seipelt =

German weightlifter (1961–2009)

Personal information
- Full name: Frank Seipelt (-Janscho)
- Born: 15 April 1961 Furtwangen im Schwarzwald, West Germany
- Died: 10 July 2009 (aged 48) Nußloch, Germany
- Height: 179 cm (5 ft 10 in)
- Weight: 110 kg (243 lb)

Sport
- Country: Germany
- Sport: Weightlifting
- Weight class: 110 kg
- Club: AC Germania 1896 St. Ilgen, Leimen; VfL Duisburg-Süd, Duisburg
- Team: National team
Medal record
Men's Weightlifting
Representing Germany
World Championships
Bronze medal – third place	1991 Donaueschingen	110 kg (clean & jerk)
- Updated on 16 November 2016

Frank Seipelt (-Janscho) (15 April 1961 – 10 July 2009) was a West-German and German male weightlifter, who competed in the 110 kg category and represented West-Germany and later Germany at international competitions. He won the bronze medal in the clean & jerk at the 1991 World Weightlifting Championships lifting 215.0 kg. He represented West-Germany at the 1984 Summer Olympics and 1988 Summer Olympics and Germany at the 1992 Summer Olympics in the 110 kg event.
