= Lin Shoufeng =

Chinese weightlifter

Personal information
- Nationality: Chinese
- Born: 27 November 1971 (age 53)

Sport
- Sport: Weightlifting

Lin Shoufeng (born 27 November 1971) is a Chinese weightlifter. He competed in the men's middleweight event at the 1996 Summer Olympics.
