= Artur Akoyev =

Russian weightlifter (born 1966)

Medal record

Men's weightlifting

Olympic Games

Representing Unified Team
Silver medal – second place	1992 Barcelona	–110 kg

World Championships

Representing Soviet Union
Silver medal – second place	1990 Budapest	+110 kg
Gold medal – first place	1991 Donaueschingen	110 kg

Representing Russia
Bronze medal – third place	1994 Istanbul	–108 kg

Artur Vladimirovich Akoyev (Russian: Артур Владимирович Акоев; born 2 January 1966 in Digora, North Ossetia-Alania) is a Russian weightlifter. He won a silver medal in the heavyweight class at the 1992 Summer Olympics in Barcelona.
