= László Németh (weightlifter) =

Hungarian weightlifter

Personal information
- Nationality: Hungarian
- Born: 11 February 1970 (age 55); Nyíregyháza, Hungary

Sport
- Sport: Weightlifting

László Németh (born 11 February 1970) is a Hungarian weightlifter. He competed in the men's heavyweight II event at the 1992 Summer Olympics.
