= Vladimir Khlud =

Belarusian weightlifter

Personal information
- Nationality: Belarusian
- Born: 18 March 1964 (age 61); Luninets, Belarus

Sport
- Sport: Weightlifting

Vladimir Khlud (born 18 March 1964) is a Belarusian weightlifter. He competed in the men's middle heavyweight event at the 1996 Summer Olympics.
