= Arto Savonen =

Finnish weightlifter

Personal information
- Nationality: Finnish
- Born: 30 September 1960 (age 64); Loimaa, Finland

Sport
- Sport: Weightlifting

Arto Savonen (born 30 September 1960) is a Finnish weightlifter. He competed in the men's heavyweight II event at the 1992 Summer Olympics.
