= Weightlifting at the 1992 Summer Olympics – Men's 52 kg =

Weightlifting at the Olympics

Men's 52 kg at the Games of the XXV Olympiad
- Venue: Pavelló de l'Espanya Industrial
- Date: 26 July 1992
- Competitors: 17 from 13 nations
- Winning total: 265.0 kg

Medalists
1st place, gold medalist(s)		Ivan Ivanov	Bulgaria
2nd place, silver medalist(s)		Lin Qisheng	China
3rd place, bronze medalist(s)		Traian Cihărean	Romania

The Men's Flyweight Weightlifting Event (– 52 kg) is the lightest men's event at the weightlifting competition, limiting competitors to a maximum of 52 kilograms of body mass. The competition took place on 26 July in the Pavelló de l'Espanya Industrial and was the first weightlifting event to conclude at the 1992 Summer Olympics.

Each lifter performed in both the snatch and clean and jerk lifts, with the final score being the sum of the lifter's best result in each. The athlete received three attempts in each of the two lifts; the score for the lift was the heaviest weight successfully lifted. Ties were broken by the lifter with the lightest body weight.

== Results ==
Rank	Name	Body Weight	Snatch (kg)			Clean & Jerk (kg)			Total (kg)
Rank	Name	Body Weight	1	2	3	1	2	3	Total (kg)
1st place, gold medalist(s)	Ivan Ivanov (BUL)	51.80	110.0	115.0	~~117.5.~~	142.5	147.5	150.0 =OR	265.0
2nd place, silver medalist(s)	Lin Qisheng (CHN)	51.60	110.0	115.0	~~117.5~~	140.0	142.5	147.5	262.5
3rd place, bronze medalist(s)	Traian Cihărean (ROU)	51.75	~~112.5~~	112.5	~~117.5~~	130.0	140.0	~~142.5~~	252.5
4	Go Gwang-gu (KOR)	51.85	107.5	112.5	~~115.0~~	135.0	140.0	~~142.5~~	252.5
5	Halil Mutlu (TUR)	51.75	105.0	110.0	112.5	135.0	~~137.5~~	~~137.5~~	247.5
6	Gil Nam-su (PRK)	51.95	100.0	~~105.0~~	~~105.0~~	130.0	135.0	~~137.5~~	235.0
7	Humberto Fuentes (VEN)	51.65	100.0	~~105.0~~	~~105.0~~	125.0	130.0	~~135.0~~	230.0
8	José Andrés Ibáñez (ESP)	51.85	95.0	100.0	~~102.5~~	122.5	~~130.0~~	~~130.0~~	227.5
9	Atsushi Irei (JPN)	51.80	95.0	100.0	~~105.0~~	115.0	~~122.5~~	122.5	222.5
10	Badathala Adisekhar (IND)	51.80	92.5	97.5	~~100.0~~	120.0	~~125.0~~	125.0	222.5
11	Alvaro Marenco (NCA)	51.90	95.0	~~100.0~~	~~100.0~~	125.0	-	-	220.0
12	Ansela Marlen Wijewickrema (SRI)	51.45	87.5	92.5	95.0	117.5	~~122.5~~	~~125.0~~	212.5
13	Sevdalin Minchev (BUL)	51.85	112.5	~~117.5~~	~~117.5~~	~~140.0~~	~~142.5~~	-	DNF
14	Zhang Zairong (CHN)	51.60	~~115.0~~	115.0	~~120.0~~	~~137.5~~	~~137.5~~	~~137.5~~	DNF
15	Enosh Depthios (INA)	51.55	~~97.5~~	~~97.5~~	97.5	~~127.5~~	~~127.5~~	~~127.5~~	DNF
16	Hiroshi Watanabe (JPN)	51.50	~~110.0~~	~~110.0~~	~~110.0~~	-	-	-	DNF
17	Kim Myong-sik (PRK)	51.90	100.0	~~105.0~~	105.0	~~140.0~~	~~140.0~~	~~140.0~~	DNF
18	Genc Barkici (ALB)	52.00	-	-	-	-	-	-	DNS
