= Zhang Zairong =

Chinese weightlifter (born 1969)

Personal information
- Born: 4 March 1969 (age 57)

Sport
- Country: China
- Sport: Weightlifting
- Weight class: 52 kg
- Team: National team
Medal record
Men's Weightlifting
Representing China
World Championships
Bronze medal – third place	1990 Budapest	52 kg
Bronze medal – third place	1991 Donaueschingen	52 kg
- Updated on 6 October 2016

Zhang Zairong (張 載榮, born 4 March 1969) is a Chinese male former weightlifter, who competed in the flyweight class and represented China at international competitions. He won the bronze medal at the 1990 and 1991 World Weightlifting Championships in the 52 kg category. He participated at the 1992 Summer Olympics in the 52 kg event. He set one flyweight snatch world record at the 1991 World Championships (120.5 kg).
