= Dursun Sevinç =

Turkish weightlifter (born 1972)

Personal information
- Nationality: Turkey
- Born: 16 March 1972 (age 54) Ankara, Turkey

Sport
- Sport: Weightlifting
- Weight class: –85 kg
Medal record
Men's weightlifting
Representing Turkey
World Championships
Silver medal – second place	1997 Chiang Mai	83 kg
European Championships
Silver medal – second place	1997 Rijeka	83 kg
Bronze medal – third place	1999 A Coruña	85 kg
Bronze medal – third place	1998 Riesa	85 kg
Bronze medal – third place	1996 Stavanger	83 kg
Bronze medal – third place	1995 Warsaw	83 kg
Mediterranean Games
Gold medal – first place	1997 Bari	83 kg S
Gold medal – first place	1997 Bari	83 kg C

Dursun Sevinç (born 16 March 1972) is a Turkish weightlifter who competed in the –85 kg division for Turkey. He represented Turkey internationally throughout the 1990s, earning medals at the World Weightlifting Championships, European Weightlifting Championships, and Mediterranean Games.

== Career ==
Born in Ankara, Sevinç was active on the international stage from the early 1990s through the 2000s. He competed at the 1996 Summer Olympics in Atlanta, finishing in the top ten.

At the World Weightlifting Championships, his best result came at the 1997 Chiang Mai event, where he won the silver medal in the –83 kg division.

He was also a multiple medalist at the European Weightlifting Championships, earning a silver in Rijeka and bronze medals in Warsaw (1995), Stavanger (1996), Riesa (1998), and A Coruña (1999). At the 1997 Mediterranean Games in Bari, he won two gold medals in the snatch and clean & jerk events.

== Major results ==
Year	Venue	Weight	Snatch (kg)				Clean & Jerk (kg)				Total	Rank
Year	Venue	Weight	1	2	3	Rank	1	2	3	Rank	Total	Rank
Olympic Games
1996	Atlanta, United States	83 kg	155	160	~~162.5~~	9	195	200	~~202.5~~	8	360	8
World Weightlifting Championships
1995	Guangzhou, China	83 kg	165	167.5	170	5	205	207.5	—	3	377.5	3rd place, bronze medalist(s)
1997	Chiang Mai, Thailand	83 kg	167.5	170	~~172.5~~	2	205	207.5	~~210~~	2	375	2nd place, silver medalist(s)
European Weightlifting Championships
1995	Warsaw, Poland	83 kg	157.5	160	~~162.5~~	3	192.5	195	—	3	355	3rd place, bronze medalist(s)
1996	Stavanger, Norway	83 kg	160	162.5	165	3	192.5	195	—	3	360	3rd place, bronze medalist(s)
1997	Rijeka, Croatia	83 kg	165	167.5	170	2	205	210	—	2	380	2nd place, silver medalist(s)
1998	Riesa, Germany	85 kg	167.5	170	~~172.5~~	3	207.5	210	—	3	377.5	3rd place, bronze medalist(s)
1999	A Coruña, Spain	85 kg	167.5	170	~~172.5~~	3	205	207.5	—	3	377.5	3rd place, bronze medalist(s)
Mediterranean Games
1997	Bari, Italy	83 kg	160	165	—	1st place, gold medalist(s)	200	205	—	1st place, gold medalist(s)	370	1st place, gold medalist(s)
European Junior Championships
1992	Cardiff, United Kingdom	83 kg	160	165	—	3	177.5	180	—	3	345	3rd place, bronze medalist(s)
