= Ilie Fătu =

Romanian weightlifter

Personal information
- Nationality: Romanian
- Born: 18 April 1974 (age 50); Bistrița, Romania

Sport
- Sport: Weightlifting

Ilie Fătu (born 18 April 1974) is a Romanian former weightlifter. He competed in the men's middleweight event at the 1996 Summer Olympics.
