= Hiroshi Watanabe (weightlifter) =

Japanese weightlifter

Personal information
- Nationality: Japanese
- Born: 21 August 1967 (age 57)

Sport
- Sport: Weightlifting

Hiroshi Watanabe (渡辺 博, Watanabe Hiroshi, born 21 August 1967) is a Japanese weightlifter. He competed in the men's flyweight event at the 1992 Summer Olympics.
