= Andrey Poitschke =

German weightlifter

Personal information
- Full name: Andrey Poitschke
- Born: 7 April 1972 (age 54) Berlin, Germany
- Height: 168 cm (5 ft 6 in)
- Weight: 84.27 kg (185.8 lb)

Sport
- Country: Germany
- Sport: Weightlifting
- Weight class: 85 kg
- Club: Berliner TSC, Berlin (GER)
- Team: National team
- Updated on 3 October 2016

Andrey Poitschke (born 7 April 1972 in Berlin) is a German male weightlifter, competing in the 85 kg category and representing Germany at international competitions. He participated at the 1996 Summer Olympics in the 76 kg event. He competed at world championships, most recently at the 1999 World Weightlifting Championships.

== Major results ==
Year	Venue	Weight	Snatch (kg)				Clean & Jerk (kg)				Total	Rank
Year	Venue	Weight	1	2	3	Rank	1	2	3	Rank	Total	Rank
Summer Olympics
1996	Atlanta, United States	76 kg				—N/a				—N/a		10
World Championships
1999	Piraeus, Greece	85 kg	157.5	162.5	~~165~~	16	187.5	~~192.5~~	---	31	350	18
