= Mehmet Yılmaz (weightlifter) =

Turkish weightlifter (born 1974)

Personal information
- Nationality: Turkey
- Born: 9 April 1974 (age 52) Turkey
- Height: 175 cm (5 ft 9 in)
- Weight: 77 kg (170 lb)

Sport
- Sport: Weightlifting
- Weight class: –77 kg
Medal record
Men's weightlifting
Representing Turkey
World Championships
Bronze medal – third place	1998 Lahti	77 kg
European Championships
Silver medal – second place	2004 Kyiv	77 kg
Bronze medal – third place	2002 Antalya	77 kg
Mediterranean Games
Gold medal – first place	1997 Bari	76 kg S
Gold medal – first place	2001 Tunis	85 kg S
Gold medal – first place	2001 Tunis	85 kg C
Silver medal – second place	2005 Almeria	77 kg C
Bronze medal – third place	1997 Bari	76 kg C
Bronze medal – third place	2005 Almeria	77 kg C

Mehmet Yılmaz (born 9 April 1974) is a Turkish weightlifter who competed in the –77 kg division. He represented Turkey at the 1996 Summer Olympics and 2000 Summer Olympics, and was a multiple medalist at the World Weightlifting Championships, European Weightlifting Championships, and Mediterranean Games.

== Career ==
Yılmaz began his international career in the mid-1990s, competing for the Turkish national team in the middleweight (–77 kg) category. He took part in two consecutive Summer Olympics — the 1996 Atlanta Games and the 2000 Sydney Games.

At the World Weightlifting Championships, he won a bronze medal at the 1998 Lahti Championships in the 77 kg division. Yılmaz also earned medals at the European Weightlifting Championships: bronze in 2002 Antalya and silver in 2004 Kyiv.

In addition, he won the gold medal at the 2001 Mediterranean Games in Tunis, representing Turkey in the middleweight class.

== Major results ==
Year	Venue	Weight	Snatch (kg)				Clean & Jerk (kg)				Total	Rank
Year	Venue	Weight	1	2	3	Rank	1	2	3	Rank	Total	Rank
Olympic Games
1996	Atlanta, United States	76 kg	150	155	~~160~~	—	180	~~185~~	—	—	335	DNF
2000	Sydney, Australia	77 kg	155	160	~~162.5~~	12	190	195	~~197.5~~	10	355	10
World Weightlifting Championships
1998	Lahti, Finland	77 kg	157.5	~~162.5~~	165	3	190	195	~~197.5~~	3	360	3rd place, bronze medalist(s)
1999	Piraeus, Greece	77 kg	160	~~165~~	~~165~~	10	190	~~195~~	~~195~~	15	350	11
2003	Vancouver, Canada	77 kg	~~160~~	~~160~~	~~160~~	—	190	195	~~197.5~~	—	0	—
European Weightlifting Championships
2002	Antalya, Turkey	77 kg	157.5	160	—	3	195	200	—	3	360	3rd place, bronze medalist(s)
2004	Kyiv, Ukraine	77 kg	160	162.5	165	2	195	200	—	2	365	2nd place, silver medalist(s)
