= Alvaro Marenco =

Nicaraguan weightlifter

Personal information
- Nationality: Nicaraguan
- Born: 28 September 1966 (age 58)

Sport
- Sport: Weightlifting

Alvaro Marenco (born 28 September 1966) is a Nicaraguan weightlifter. He competed in the men's flyweight event at the 1992 Summer Olympics.
