= Tennis at the 1993 Mediterranean Games =

Sporting event

The tennis competitions at the 1993 Mediterranean Games in Languedoc-Roussillon, France from June 16–27.

Athletes competed in 4 events.

== Medal summary ==
=== Medalists ===
Event	Gold	Silver	Bronze
Men's singles	Younes El Aynaoui; Morocco	Jordi Burillo; Spain	Alberto Berasategui; Spain
Men's doubles	Massimo Bertolini and Mosé Navarra; Italy	Alberto Berasategui and Jordi Burillo; Spain	Younes El Aynaoui and Mohammed Ridaoui; Morocco
Women's singles	Maja Murić; Croatia	Virginia Ruano Pascual; Spain	Lea Ghirardi; France
Women's doubles	Maja Murić and Silvija Talaja; Croatia	Carole Lucarelli and Lea Ghirardi; France	Virginia Ruano Pascual and Eva Jiménez; Spain

=== Medal table ===
Key:

* Host nation (France)

Rank	Nation	Gold	Silver	Bronze	Total
1	Croatia	2	0	0	2
2	Morocco	1	0	1	2
3	Italy	1	0	0	1
4	Spain	0	3	2	5
5	France*	0	1	1	2
Totals (5 entries)		4	4	4	12
