= Lin Qisheng =

Chinese weightlifter (born 1971)

Medal record

Representing China

Men's Olympic weightlifting

Olympic Games
Silver medal – second place	1992 Barcelona	-52 kg

Lin Qisheng (Chinese: 林启升; born July 7, 1971) is a Chinese male weightlifter who won a silver medal at the 1992 Summer Olympics in the Men's 52 kg weightclass. He is 151 centimeters (4 ft 11.5 in) tall.
