= Sedat Artuç =

Turkish weightlifter (born 1976)

Personal information
- Nationality: Turkey
- Born: 9 June 1976 (age 50) Oltu, Erzurum Province, Turkey
- Height: 1.60 m (5.2 ft)
- Weight: 56 kg (123 lb)

Sport
- Sport: Weightlifting
- Weight class: 56 kg
- Club: EGO Sports Club, Ankara
- Coached by: Tuncer Şenses
Medal record
Men's weightlifting
Representing Turkey
Olympic Games
Bronze medal – third place	2004 Athens	56 kg
World Championships
Bronze medal – third place	2003 Vancouver	56 kg
European Championships
Gold medal – first place	2004 Kyiv	56 kg
Gold medal – first place	2005 Sofia	56 kg
Silver medal – second place	1998 Riesa	56 kg
Silver medal – second place	2002 Antalya	56 kg
Mediterranean Games
Gold medal – first place	2001 Tunis	56 kg S
Gold medal – first place	2001 Tunis	56 kg C
Gold medal – first place	2005 Almería	62 kg C
Silver medal – second place	2005 Almería	62 kg S
Silver medal – second place	2009 Almería	56 kg S
Silver medal – second place	1997 Bari	59 kg S
Bronze medal – third place	1997 Bari	59 kg C

Sedat Artuç (born 9 June 1976) is a Turkish weightlifter who competed in the 56 kg division. He is a European champion and an Olympic bronze medalist, also winning medals at the World and European Championships.

== Career ==
Artuç was born in Oltu, Erzurum Province, Turkey. He began competing internationally in the 1990s and represented the Turkish national team for more than a decade. He won the bronze medal at the 2004 Summer Olympics in Athens in the men’s 56 kg event. He also took bronze at the 2003 World Championships in Vancouver, and became European champion twice (2004 Kyiv and 2005 Sofia).

He was a member of the EGO Sports Club in Ankara and trained under coach Tuncer Şenses.

In 2005, Artuç was suspended by the International Weightlifting Federation for two years after testing positive for a banned substance.

== Major results ==
Year	Venue	Weight	Snatch (kg)				Clean & Jerk (kg)				Total	Rank
Year	Venue	Weight	1	2	3	Rank	1	2	3	Rank	Total	Rank
Olympic Games
2004	Athens, Greece	56 kg	120	125	~~127.5~~	4	150	155	—	3	280	3rd place, bronze medalist(s)
World Weightlifting Championships
2003	Vancouver, Canada	56 kg	122.5	125	—	4	150	152.5	—	4	277.5	3rd place, bronze medalist(s)
European Weightlifting Championships
1998	Riesa, Germany	56 kg	120	122.5	—	2	145	147.5	—	2	267.5	2nd place, silver medalist(s)
2002	Antalya, Turkey	56 kg	120	122.5	—	2	145	150	—	2	272.5	2nd place, silver medalist(s)
2004	Kyiv, Ukraine	56 kg	125	127.5	—	1	152.5	155	—	1	280	1st place, gold medalist(s)
2005	Sofia, Bulgaria	56 kg	122.5	125	—	1	150	155	—	1	275	1st place, gold medalist(s)
Mediterranean Games
2005	Almería, Spain	62 kg	150	155	—	2nd place, silver medalist(s)	220	225	—	1st place, gold medalist(s)	380	1st place, gold medalist(s)
2009	Pescara, Italy	56 kg	115	120	—	2nd place, silver medalist(s)	145	150	—	2nd place, silver medalist(s)	270	2nd place, silver medalist(s)
