= Igor Alekseyev (weightlifter) =

Russian weightlifter (born 1972)

Personal information
- Nationality: Russia; Australia
- Born: 27 December 1972 (age 53)
- Height: 172 cm (5 ft 8 in)
- Weight: 91 kg (201 lb)

Sport
- Country: Russia; Australia
- Sport: Weightlifting
- Weight class: 91 kg
- Team: National team
Medal record
Men's Weightlifting
Representing Russia
World Championships
Gold medal – first place	1995 Guangzhou	91 kg
- Updated on 6 October 2016

Igor Alekseyev (Игорь Алексеев, born 27 December 1972) is a Russian male former weightlifter, who competed in the middle heavyweight class and represented Russia at international competitions. He later emigrated to Australia and competed for them after 1994.. He won the gold medal at the 1995 World Weightlifting Championships in the 91 kg category. He participated at the 1996 Summer Olympics in the 91 kg event.
