= Hamdy Basiony Hassan =

Egyptian weightlifter

Personal information
- Nationality: Egyptian
- Born: 16 April 1965 (age 59)

Sport
- Sport: Weightlifting

Hamdy Basiony Hassan (born 16 April 1965) is an Egyptian weightlifter. He competed in the men's middleweight event at the 1992 Summer Olympics.
