= Viktor Belyatsky =

Belarusian weightlifter (born 1970)

Personal information
- Nationality: Belarusian
- Born: 8 November 1970 (age 54); Navapolatsk, Belarus

Sport
- Sport: Weightlifting

Viktor Belyatsky (born 8 November 1970) is a Belarusian weightlifter. He competed in the men's middle heavyweight event at the 1996 Summer Olympics.
