= Igor Alexeyev (footballer) =

Russian footballer

Personal information
- Full name: Igor Nikolayevich Alexeyev
- Date of birth: 23 October 1984 (age 42)
- Place of birth: Nikolskoye, Leningrad Oblast, Russian SFSR
- Height: 1.87 m (6 ft 2 in)
- Positions: Defender; midfielder

Senior career*
Years	Team	Apps	(Gls)
2002	FC Svetogorets Svetogorsk	4	(0)
2003	FC Pskov-2000	0	(0)
2004	FC Avangard St. Petersburg		
2005	FC Volga Nizhny Novgorod	24	(0)
2006–2008	FC Nosta Novotroitsk	49	(2)
2008	FC Mashuk-KMV Pyatigorsk	10	(0)
2009	FC Nosta Novotroitsk	18	(1)
2010	FC Zenit Penza	25	(3)
2011–2013	FC Avangard Kursk	37	(0)
2014	FC Zenit Penza	7	(0)
2016–2017	FC Dynamo St. Petersburg	25	(2)
2017–2018	FC Dynamo-2 Saint Petersburg	17	(1)
- * Club domestic league appearances and goals

Igor Nikolayevich Alexeyev (Russian: И́горь Никола́евич Алексе́ев; born 23 October 1984) is a Russian former professional association football player.

== Club career ==
He played 3 seasons in the Russian Football National League for FC Nosta Novotroitsk and FC Mashuk-KMV Pyatigorsk.
