= Emine Bilgin =

Turkish weightlifter (born 1984)

Personal information
- Nationality: Turkey
- Born: 15 July 1984 (age 42) Turkey

Sport
- Sport: Weightlifting
- Weight class: 53 kg, 58 kg
Medal record
Women's weightlifting
Representing Turkey
World Championships
Bronze medal – third place	2002 Warsaw	58 kg S
European Championships
Gold medal – first place	2001 Trenčín	53 kg
Silver medal – second place	2002 Antalya	53 kg
Silver medal – second place	2003 Loutraki	58 kg
Bronze medal – third place	2009 Bucharest	53 kg
Mediterranean Games
Gold medal – first place	2001 Tunis	58 kg S
Gold medal – first place	2001 Tunis	58 kg C
Gold medal – first place	2005 Almeria	58 kg S
Silver medal – second place	2009 Pescara	53 kg C
Bronze medal – third place	2005 Almeria	58 kg C

Emine Bilgin (born 15 July 1984) is a Turkish weightlifter who competed in the 53 kg and 58 kg divisions. She is a European champion, a World Championships bronze medalist, and a multiple medalist at the Mediterranean Games representing Turkey between 2000 and 2010.

== Career ==
Bilgin began competing internationally at a young age and achieved her first major success at the 2001 European Weightlifting Championships in Trenčín, Slovakia, where she won the gold medal in the 53 kg division. She later earned a bronze medal in the snatch event at the 2002 World Weightlifting Championships in Warsaw, and continued to collect medals at continental level — silver in Antalya (2002), silver in Loutraki (2003), and bronze in Bucharest (2009).

At the 2001 Mediterranean Games in Tunis, she claimed two gold medals (snatch and clean & jerk), and added a bronze at the 2009 Mediterranean Games in Pescara. She was highlighted in Turkish media at the time as one of the rising stars of women’s weightlifting, with newspapers like Hürriyet describing her as a symbol of success for Turkish female athletes.

While training in Çorum for the upcoming 2010 European Weightlifting Championships, Emine Bilgin was tested positive to banned substance in a routine check. She was later officially suspended from competition until March 28, 2014.

== Major results ==
Year	Venue	Weight	Snatch (kg)				Clean & Jerk (kg)				Total	Rank
Year	Venue	Weight	1	2	3	Rank	1	2	3	Rank	Total	Rank
World Weightlifting Championships
2002	Warsaw, Poland	58 kg	92.5	95.0	~~97.5~~	3rd place, bronze medalist(s)	—	—	—	—	—	3rd place, bronze medalist(s)
European Weightlifting Championships
2001	Trenčín, Slovakia	53 kg	—	—	—	1st place, gold medalist(s)	—	—	—	—	—	1st place, gold medalist(s)
2002	Antalya, Turkey	53 kg	—	—	—	2nd place, silver medalist(s)	—	—	—	—	—	2nd place, silver medalist(s)
2003	Loutraki, Greece	58 kg	—	—	—	2nd place, silver medalist(s)	—	—	—	—	—	2nd place, silver medalist(s)
2009	Bucharest, Romania	53 kg	83.0	—	—	3rd place, bronze medalist(s)	103.0	—	—	3rd place, bronze medalist(s)	186.0	3rd place, bronze medalist(s)
Mediterranean Games
2001	Tunis, Tunisia	58 kg	88.0	91.0	—	1st place, gold medalist(s)	108.0	110.0	—	1st place, gold medalist(s)	201.0	1st place, gold medalist(s)
2009	Pescara, Italy	53 kg	—	—	—	3rd place, bronze medalist(s)	—	—	—	3rd place, bronze medalist(s)	—	3rd place, bronze medalist(s)
