= Enosh Depthios =

Indonesian weightlifter

Personal information
- Nationality: Indonesian
- Born: 5 August 1971 (age 53)

Sport
- Sport: Weightlifting

Enosh Depthios (born 5 August 1971) is an Indonesian weightlifter. He competed in the men's flyweight event at the 1992 Summer Olympics.
