= Jon Chol-ho =

North Korean weightlifter (born 1969)

Jon Chol-Ho
Personal information
- Native name: 전철호
- Born: 7 April 1969 (age 57)
- Weight: 76–79 kg (168–174 lb)

Sport
- Country: North Korea
- Sport: Weightlifting
- Weight class: 75 kg
- Team: National team
Medal record
Men's Weightlifting
Representing North Korea
Olympic Games
| Bronze medal – third place | 1996 Atlanta | 76 kg |
World Championships
| Bronze medal – third place | 1989 Athens | 75 kg |
- Updated on 6 October 2016

Jon Chol-ho (born 7 April 1969) is a North Korean former weightlifter, who competed in the middleweight class and represented North Korea at international competitions. He won the bronze medal at the 1989 World Weightlifting Championships in the 75 kg category. He won the bronze medal at the 1996 Summer Olympics in the 76 kg event. He also participated at the 1992 Summer Olympics in the 82.5 kg event and 2000 Summer Olympics in the 77 kg event. He won the gold medal at the 1990 Asian Games in the Lightweight class.
