= Khalil El-Sayed =

Egyptian weightlifter

Personal information
- Nationality: Egyptian
- Born: 23 January 1965 (age 60)

Sport
- Sport: Weightlifting

Khalil El-Sayed (born 23 January 1965) is an Egyptian weightlifter. He competed in the men's middleweight event at the 1988 Summer Olympics.
