= Marek Maślany =

Polish weightlifter (born 1966)

Personal information
- Nationality: Polish
- Born: 11 July 1966 (age 58); Rejowiec Fabryczny, Poland

Sport
- Sport: Weightlifting

Marek Maślany (born 11 July 1966) is a Polish weightlifter. He competed in the men's middle heavyweight event at the 1996 Summer Olympics.
