= Christos Constandinidis =

Greek weightlifter (born 1965)

Personal information
- Nationality: Greek
- Born: 10 May 1965 (age 59)

Sport
- Sport: Weightlifting

Christos Constandinidis (born 10 May 1965) is a Greek weightlifter. He competed in the men's lightweight event at the 1988 Summer Olympics.
