= Kim Myong-sik (weightlifter) =

North Korean weightlifter (born 1969)

Personal information
- Native name: 김명식
- Nationality: North Korean
- Born: 30 June 1969 (age 56)
- Weight: 52 kg (115 lb)

Sport
- Sport: Weightlifting
- Weight class: Flyweight
Medal record
Men's weightlifting
Representing North Korea
Asian Games
Bronze medal – third place	1990 Beijing	52 kg
East Asian Games
Bronze medal – third place	1993 Shanghai	54 kg

Kim Myong-sik (Korean: 김명식; born 30 June 1969) is a North Korean former weightlifter. He competed in the men's flyweight event at the 1992 Summer Olympics.

== Biography ==
Kim was born on 30 June 1969 and grew up in North Korea. Measuring at 52 kilograms (115 lb), he became a competitive weightlifter and was classified as a flyweight. He competed at the 1989 World Weightlifting Championships in Athens, Greece, where he placed seventh in the flyweight event, with a total score of 235 kilograms (518 lb). He returned for the 1990 World Weightlifting Championships in Budapest, Hungary, where he won a silver medal in the clean and jerk event (with a lift of 137.5 kilograms (303 lb)) while finishing fourth overall, with a total of 239 kilograms (527 lb).

That year, Kim also competed at the Asian Games in Beijing, China, winning the overall bronze medal in his event. He competed at an international tournament in Australia in 1991, finishing second to Ivan Ivanov. He was selected to represent North Korea at the 1992 Summer Olympics in Barcelona, Spain, and competed in the flyweight event. He began with a placement of eighth in the clean and jerk portion of the event, with a lift of 105 kilograms (231 lb), but then was unable to complete his attempted lifts in the snatch event and finished tied for last with the mark of "Did Not Finish". The following year, Kim competed at the inaugural East Asian Games in Shanghai, participating in the 54 kg class and winning bronze with a total of 257.5 kilograms (568 lb), which was his last known appearance.
