= Fabio Magrini =

Italian weightlifter

Personal information
- Nationality: Italian
- Born: 23 December 1965 (age 59); Bussolengo, Italy

Sport
- Sport: Weightlifting

Fabio Magrini (born 23 December 1965) is an Italian weightlifter. He competed in the men's heavyweight I event at the 1988 Summer Olympics.
