= Fedail Güler =

Turkish weightlifter (born 1972)

Personal information
- Nationality: Turkish
- Born: 1 January 1972 (age 54) Momchilgrad, Kardzhali Province, Bulgaria
- Weight: 70 kg (154 lb)

Sport
- Country: Turkey
- Sport: Weightlifting
- Weight class: –70 kg; –69 kg
- Retired: yes
Medal record
Men's weightlifting
Representing Turkey
World Championships
Gold medal – first place	1994 Istanbul	70 kg
Silver medal – second place	1995 Guangzhou	70 kg
European Championships
Gold medal – first place	1995 Warsaw	70 kg
Silver medal – second place	1994 Sokolov	70 kg
Mediterranean Games
Gold medal – first place	1991 Athens	67 kg C
Gold medal – first place	1991 Athens	67 kg T
Gold medal – first place	1993 Languedoc	64 kg S
Gold medal – first place	1993 Languedoc	64 kg T
Gold medal – first place	1997 Bari	70 kg S
Gold medal – first place	1997 Bari	70 kg C
Silver medal – second place	1991 Athens	67 kg S
Silver medal – second place	1993 Languedoc	64 kg C
World Junior Championships
Gold medal – first place	1991 Wolmirstedt	69 kg
European Junior Championships
Gold medal – first place	1992 Cardiff	69 kg

Fedail Güler (born 1 January 1972) is a Turkish former weightlifter, world and European champion, who competed in the lightweight division. He won the gold medal at the 1994 World Weightlifting Championships in Istanbul, lifting 160 kg in the snatch and 350 kg in total, both world records at the time.

== Career ==
Born in Bulgaria to a Turkish family, Güler began weightlifting in 1986.

He won the gold medal at the 1991 World Junior Weightlifting Championships in Wolmirstedt, Germany, and another gold at the 1992 European Junior Weightlifting Championships in Cardiff, United Kingdom.

At the 1994 World Weightlifting Championships in Istanbul, Güler set a world record by lifting 160 kg in snatch and 350 kg in total, earning the world title. The following year, he won the European Championship in Warsaw and took silver at the 1995 World Weightlifting Championships in Guangzhou.

He represented Turkey at the 1996 Summer Olympics. After retiring from active competition, Güler served as an advisor to the Turkish Ministry of Youth and Sports.

Güler is considered part of the “golden generation” of Turkish weightlifters alongside Naim Süleymanoğlu and Halil Mutlu, contributing to Turkey’s international success in the 1990s.

== Major results ==
Year	Venue	Weight	Snatch (kg)				Clean & Jerk (kg)				Total	Rank
Year	Venue	Weight	1	2	3	Rank	1	2	3	Rank	Total	Rank
World Weightlifting Championships
1994	Istanbul, Turkey	70 kg	155	158	160	1st place, gold medalist(s)	187	190	~~192~~	2nd place, silver medalist(s)	350	1st place, gold medalist(s)
1995	Guangzhou, China	70 kg	155	157.5	~~160~~	1st place, gold medalist(s)	185	187.5	~~190~~	3rd place, bronze medalist(s)	345	2nd place, silver medalist(s)
European Weightlifting Championships
1994	Sokolov, Czech Republic	70 kg	150	155	~~157.5~~	2nd place, silver medalist(s)	175	177	180	2nd place, silver medalist(s)	335	2nd place, silver medalist(s)
1995	Warsaw, Poland	70 kg	155	157	160	1st place, gold medalist(s)	185	187	190	1st place, gold medalist(s)	350	1st place, gold medalist(s)
World Junior Weightlifting Championships
1991	Wolmirstedt, Germany	69 kg	137.5	140	~~142.5~~	1st place, gold medalist(s)	167.5	172.5	—	1st place, gold medalist(s)	312.5	1st place, gold medalist(s)
European Junior Weightlifting Championships
1992	Cardiff, United Kingdom	69 kg	138	140	140	1st place, gold medalist(s)	170	172	172.5	1st place, gold medalist(s)	312.5	1st place, gold medalist(s)
