= Vladimir Yemelyanov (weightlifter) =

Belarusian weightlifter (born 1970)

Vladimir Yemelyanov (Russian:ВЛАДИМИР ЕМЕЛЬЯНОВ) (born April 22, 1970 in Gomel), also known as Vladimir Emelyanov, is a weightlifter who competed for Belarus in the 1996 Summer Olympics. He won a silver medal at the European championships in 1995.
