= Giovanni Scarantino =

Italian weightlifter

Personal information
- Nationality: Italian
- Born: 19 March 1966 (age 59); Caltanissetta, Italy

Sport
- Sport: Weightlifting

Giovanni Scarantino (born 19 March 1966) is an Italian weightlifter. He competed at the 1988 Summer Olympics, the 1992 Summer Olympics and the 1996 Summer Olympics.
