= Erdinç Aslan =

Turkish weightlifter (born 1968)

Personal information
- Nationality: Turkish
- Born: 8 May 1968 (age 56)

Sport
- Sport: Weightlifting

Erdinç Aslan (born 8 May 1968) is a Turkish weightlifter. He competed at the 1992 Summer Olympics and the 1996 Summer Olympics.
