= Leonid Lobachev =

Belarusian weightlifter (born 1966)

Personal information
- Full name: Leonid Mikhaylovich Lobachov
- Born: 30 August 1966 (age 59) Gomel Region, Belarus
- Weight: 76 kg (168 lb)

Sport
- Country: Belarus
- Sport: Weightlifting
- Weight class: 76 kg
- Team: National team
Medal record
Men's Weightlifting
Representing BLR
World Championships
Bronze medal – third place	1994	76 kg (snatch)
- Updated on 16 November 2016

Leonid Mikhaylovich Lobachov (Леонид Михайлович Лобачёв; born 30 August 1966) is a Belarusian male former weightlifter, who competed in the 76 kg category and represented Belarus at international competitions. He won the bronze medal in the snatch at the 1994 World Weightlifting Championships lifting 162.5 kg. He participated at the 1996 Summer Olympics.
