= Khachatur Kyapanaktsyan =

Armenian weightlifter (1968–2007)

Medal record

Men's Weightlifting

Representing Armenia

European Championships
Gold medal – first place	1993 Sofia	-76 kg
Silver medal – second place	1994 Sokolov	-76 kg
Silver medal – second place	1995 Warsaw	-76 kg
Bronze medal – third place	1998 Riesa	-76 kg

Khachatur Kyapanaktsyan (Armenian: Խաչատուր Քյափանակցյան; June 24, 1968 – September 30, 2007) was an Armenian weightlifter. He set two world records in the snatch.

Kyapanaktsyan was born in Leninakan, Armenian SSR (now Gyumri, Armenia), a city known for producing elite weightlifters. He won a gold medal at the 1993 European Weightlifting Championships and competed at the 1996 Summer Olympics. Kyapanaktsyan also set two world records, both in the snatch.

On September 30, 2007, Kyapanaktsyan died at the age of 39 in a car accident on the Gyumri-Vanadzor highway.
