= Ergün Batmaz =

Turkish weightlifter (born 1967)

Personal information
- Nationality: Turkey
- Born: July 16, 1967 (age 59)

Sport
- Sport: Weightlifting
- Weight class: –69 kg, –70 kg
Medal record
World Championships
Silver medal – second place	1993 Melbourne	70 kg
Bronze medal – third place	1995 Guangzhou	70 kg
European Championships
Gold medal – first place	1997 Rijeka	70 kg
Silver medal – second place	1998 Riesa	69 kg
Bronze medal – third place	1990 Aalborg	67 kg
Bronze medal – third place	1994 Sokolov	70 kg
Bronze medal – third place	1996 Stavanger	70 kg
Mediterranean Games
Gold medal – first place	1993 Languedoc	64 kg S
Silver medal – second place	1993 Languedoc	64 kg C
Silver medal – second place	1993 Languedoc	64 kg T
Bronze medal – third place	1991 Athens	67 kg S

Ergün Batmaz (born 16 July 1967) is a Turkish weightlifter. He became the European Champion in 1997 Rijeka and also won a silver and a bronze medal at the World Championships.

== Career ==
Batmaz emerged as one of Turkey’s leading weightlifters in the late 1980s. He represented Turkey at the 1988 Summer Olympics in Seoul and again at the 1996 Summer Olympics in Atlanta.

At the 1993 World Championships held in Melbourne, he won the silver medal in the 70 kg category. Two years later, at the 1995 Championships in Guangzhou, he claimed the bronze medal. Between 1990 and 1998, Batmaz earned one gold, one silver, and three bronze medals at the European Weightlifting Championships, reaching his career peak in 1997 when he became European Champion in Rijeka.

He also won a silver medal at the 1993 Mediterranean Games in Languedoc, France.

After retiring from competition, Batmaz became a coach. He has trained both the men’s and women’s Turkish national weightlifting teams as well as the club Büyükşehir Belediye Ankaraspor.

== Major results ==
Year	Location	Weight	Snatch (kg)				Clean & Jerk (kg)				Total	Rank
Year	Location	Weight	1	2	3	Rank	1	2	3	Rank	Total	Rank
Olympic Games
1988	Seoul, South Korea	67.5 kg	142.5	147.5	150	5	172.5	177.5	~~180~~	5	327.5	5
1996	Atlanta, United States	70 kg	145	147.5	150	11	175	180	~~182.5~~	11	330	11
World Championships
1993	Melbourne, Australia	70 kg	147.5	150	152.5	3	177.5	182.5	~~185~~	2	332.5	2nd place, silver medalist(s)
1995	Guangzhou, China	70 kg	152.5	155	~~157.5~~	3	182.5	185	~~187.5~~	3	340	3rd place, bronze medalist(s)
European Championships
1990	Aalborg, Denmark	67.5 kg	142.5	145	~~147.5~~	3	167.5	170	172.5	3	315	3rd place, bronze medalist(s)
1994	Sokolov, Czech Republic	70 kg	150	152.5	~~155~~	3	177.5	180	~~182.5~~	3	332.5	3rd place, bronze medalist(s)
1996	Stavanger, Norway	70 kg	150	152.5	155	3	175	177.5	180	3	327.5	3rd place, bronze medalist(s)
1997	Rijeka, Croatia	70 kg	152.5	155	155	2	190	192.5	~~195~~	1	347.5	1st place, gold medalist(s)
1998	Riesa, Germany	69 kg	142.5	145	145	2	172.5	175	~~177.5~~	3	320	2nd place, silver medalist(s)
Mediterranean Games
1993	Languedoc, France	70 kg	145	147.5	150	2	175	180	~~182.5~~	2	330	2nd place, silver medalist(s)
