= Leonidas Kokas =

Greek weightlifter (born 1973)

Medal record

Men's weightlifting

Representing Greece

Olympic Games
Silver medal – second place	1996 Atlanta	91 kg

Leonidas Kokas (Greek: Λεωνίδας Κόκας; born 3 June 1973), also spelled Kokkas (Greek: Κόκκας), is a Greek weightlifter. His highest distinction was winning the silver medal in the 1996 Atlanta Olympic Games. He competed in the 94 kg category.

== Life and sport results ==
Kokkas was born in Kakavijë, Dropull, Albania, to an ethnic Greek family.

In 1991, along with Pyrros Dimas, Giorgos Tzelilis, Leonidas Sabanis and Viktor Mitrou, Kokas left Albania for Greece. There, he joined Spartakos club of Ioannina. In 1996, he won Olympic silver, in Atlanta, in the 91 kg category. He lifted 215 kg in the jerk and 175 in the snatch for a second-place 390 kg total. He celebrated his win with close friend Pyrros Dimas, with whom he shared a room for the past several months. He also won silver in the 1997 Mediterranean Games, in the 91-kg category, by lifting 160 kg in the snatch. A serious injury forced him out of the 2000 Sydney Olympics.

Leonidas Kokas is now an Artillery Lieutenant in the Greek Army.
