= Dariusz Osuch =

Polish weightlifter (born 1969)

Personal information
- Nationality: Polish
- Born: 20 February 1969 (age 56); Biłgoraj, Poland

Sport
- Sport: Weightlifting

Dariusz Osuch (born 20 February 1969) is a Polish weightlifter. He competed at the 1992 Summer Olympics and the 1996 Summer Olympics.
