= Éric Bonnel =

French weightlifter (born 1974)

Éric Bonnel (born 18 August 1974 in Haubourdin, Nord) is a French retired weightlifter. He competed in three consecutive Summer Olympics for his native country, starting in 1996. His best finish was the 11th place in the men's bantamweight division in 1996. He is 150 centimeters (4 feet 11 inches) tall.
