= Mücahit Yağcı =

Turkish weightlifter

Personal information
- Nationality: Turkish
- Born: 2 May 1973 (age 51); Eskişehir, Turkey

Sport
- Sport: Weightlifting

Mücahit Yağcı (born 2 May 1973) is a Turkish weightlifter. He competed in the men's featherweight event at the 1996 Summer Olympics.
