= Viktor Mitrou =

Greek weightlifter (born 1973)

Personal information
- Native name: Βίκτωρ Μήτρου
- Nationality: Greek
- Born: Viktor Mitro; 24 June 1973 (age 53) Vlorë, Albania
Medal record
Men's weightlifting
Representing Greece
Olympic Games
Silver medal – second place	2000 Sydney	– 77 kg
World Championships
Silver medal – second place	1999 Athens	– 77 kg

Viktor Mitrou (Greek: Βίκτωρ Μήτρου; born 24 June 1973) is a retired male Greek weightlifter. He initially represented Albania, but became internationally distinguished with the Greece national team. Mitrou won a silver medal for Greece in the 2000 Summer Olympics.

== Results ==
Born Viktor Mitro, in Vlorë, Albania, he initially represented Albania internationally until 1993, and then Greece for three consecutive Olympiads (1996, 2000, and 2004). Notably he became an Olympic medalist for Greece during the 2000 Summer Olympics, when he claimed the silver medal in the men's – 77 kg class. In that competition Mitrou lost first place to Chinese Zhan Xugang, only because of his own heavier body weight. Mitrou lost the third place in 1996 Summer Olympics and 2004 Summer Olympics again because of his own heavier body weight.
