= Sunay Bulut =

Turkish weightlifter (born 1967)

Personal information
- Nationality: Turkey
- Born: 1 December 1967 (age 58) Plovdiv, Bulgaria
- Weight: 82–99 kg (181–218 lb)

Sport
- Sport: Weightlifting
- Weight class: –82.5 kg
Medal record
Men's weightlifting
Representing Turkey
World Championships
Bronze medal – third place	1994 Istanbul	83 kg
European Championships
Gold medal – first place	1996 Stavanger	91 kg
Gold medal – first place	1997 Rijeka	91 kg
Bronze medal – third place	1991 Władysławowo	82.5 kg
Mediterranean Games
Gold medal – first place	1993 Languedoc	83 kg S
Gold medal – first place	1993 Languedoc	83 kg C
Gold medal – first place	1993 Languedoc	83 kg T
Gold medal – first place	1997 Bari	99 kg S
Silver medal – second place	1997 Bari	99 kg C

Sunay Bulut (born 1 December 1967) is a Turkish weightlifter, two-time European champion and World bronze medalist. He competed internationally in the light-heavyweight, middle-heavyweight and heavyweight divisions.

== Career ==
Born in Plovdiv, Bulgaria, Bulut represented Turkey in two Summer Olympics: the 1992 Barcelona Games (light-heavyweight, 13th place) and the 1996 Atlanta Games (middle-heavyweight, 4th place).

At the World Weightlifting Championships, his best result was a bronze medal at the 1994 Istanbul Championships (83 kg). In continental competition, he won a bronze medal at the 1991 Władysławowo event (82.5 kg) and became European champion twice — in Stavanger and Rijeka (91 kg).

He also enjoyed success at the Mediterranean Games, winning gold in light-heavyweight at the 1993 Languedoc-Roussillon Games and in 1997 (Bari), a gold medal in clean & jerk and a silver medal in snatch in the heavyweight division.

After retiring from competition, he worked in weightlifting development and coaching programs in Turkey.

== Major results ==
Year	Venue	Weight	Snatch (kg)				Clean & Jerk (kg)				Total	Rank
Year	Venue	Weight	1	2	3	Rank	1	2	3	Rank	Total	Rank
Olympic Games
1992	Barcelona, Spain	82.5 kg	150	155	~~160~~	13	185	~~190~~	—	13	335	13
1996	Atlanta, United States	91 kg	165	170	~~172.5~~	5	205	210	~~212.5~~	4	380	4
World Weightlifting Championships
1994	Istanbul, Turkey	83 kg	155	160	~~162.5~~	4	195	200	—	3	360	3rd place, bronze medalist(s)
European Weightlifting Championships
1991	Władysławowo, Poland	82.5 kg	155	160	—	3	190	195	—	3	355	3rd place, bronze medalist(s)
1996	Stavanger, Norway	91 kg	160	165	167.5	1	200	205	—	1	372.5	1st place, gold medalist(s)
1997	Rijeka, Croatia	91 kg	162.5	165	167.5	1	205	210	—	1	377.5	1st place, gold medalist(s)
Mediterranean Games
1993	Languedoc-Roussillon, France	82.5 kg	150	152.5	155	1	185	190	—	1	345	1st place, gold medalist(s)
1997	Bari, Italy	99 kg	160	165	167.5	2nd place, silver medalist(s)	200	205	—	1st place, gold medalist(s)	372.5	—
