= Pavlos Saltsidis =

Greek weightlifter (born 1963)

Personal information
- Nationality: Greek
- Born: 17 July 1963 (age 61); Thessaloniki, Greece

Sport
- Sport: Weightlifting

Pavlos Saltsidis (born 17 July 1963) is a Greek weightlifter. He competed at the 1988 Summer Olympics, the 1992 Summer Olympics and the 1996 Summer Olympics. He was named the 1990 Greek Male Athlete of the Year.
