= World record progression men's weightlifting (1993–1997) =

This is the list of world records progression in men's weightlifting from 1993 and 1997. Records are maintained in each weight class for the snatch lift, clean and jerk lift, and the total for both lifts. The International Weightlifting Federation restructured its weight classes in 1993, nullifying earlier records and again in 1998 and 2018.

== 54 kg ==
=== Snatch ===
Athlete	Record (kg)	Date	Meet	Place
World standard	122.5	11 November 1993	—	—
(Cuba) William Vargas	123.0	23 November 1993		Ponce
(Bulgaria) Sevdalin Minchev	125.0	4 May 1993	European Championships	Sokolov
(Turkey) Halil Mutlu	127.5	18 November 1994	World Championships	Istanbul
(Turkey) Halil Mutlu	130.0	18 November 1994	World Championships	Istanbul
(Turkey) Halil Mutlu	130.5	3 May 1995	European Championships	Warsaw
(Turkey) Halil Mutlu	132.5	20 July 1996	Olympic Games	Atlanta

=== Clean & jerk ===
Athlete	Record (kg)	Date	Meet	Place
World standard	157.5	11 November 1993	—	—
(Turkey) Halil Mutlu	158.0	18 November 1994	World Championships	Istanbul
(Turkey) Halil Mutlu	160.0	18 November 1994	World Championships	Istanbul
(China) Lan Shizhang	160.5	6 December 1997	World Championships	Chiang Mai

=== Total ===
Athlete	Record (kg)	Date	Meet	Place
World standard	275.0	11 November 1993	—	—
(Bulgaria) Ivan Ivanov	277.5	12 November 1993	World Championships	Melbourne
(Turkey) Halil Mutlu	282.5	18 November 1994	World Championships	Istanbul
(Turkey) Halil Mutlu	287.5	18 November 1994	World Championships	Istanbul
(Turkey) Halil Mutlu	290.0	18 November 1994	World Championships	Istanbul

== 59 kg ==
=== Snatch ===
Athlete	Record (kg)	Date	Meet	Place
World standard	137.5	11 November 1993	—	—
(Turkey) Hafız Süleymanoğlu	138.0	3 May 1995	European Championships	Warsaw
(Bulgaria) Sevdalin Minchev	138.5	3 May 1995	European Championships	Warsaw
(Turkey) Hafız Süleymanoğlu	138.0	3 May 1995	European Championships	Warsaw

=== Clean & jerk ===
Athlete	Record (kg)	Date	Meet	Place
World standard	160.0	11 November 1993	—	—
(Croatia) Nikolaj Pešalov	167.5	13 November 1993	World Championships	Melbourne
(Croatia) Nikolaj Pešalov	168.0	19 November 1994	World Championships	Istanbul
(Croatia) Nikolaj Pešalov	170.0	3 May 1995	European Championships	Warsaw

=== Total ===
Athlete	Record (kg)	Date	Meet	Place
World standard	297.5	11 November 1993	—	—
(Croatia) Nikolaj Pešalov	305.0	13 November 1993	World Championships	Melbourne
(China) Tang Lingsheng	307.5	21 July 1996	Olympic Games	Atlanta

== 64 kg ==
=== Snatch ===
Athlete	Record (kg)	Date	Meet	Place
World standard	145.0	11 November 1993	—	—
(Turkey) Naim Süleymanoğlu	145.5	5 May 1994	European Championships	Sokolov
(Hungary) Attila Czanka	146.0	7 August 1994		Szekszárd
(Greece) Valerios Leonidis	146.5	20 November 1994	World Championships	Istanbul
(Turkey) Naim Süleymanoğlu	147.5	20 November 1994	World Championships	Istanbul
(Greece) Valerios Leonidis	148.0	19 November 1995	World Championships	Guangzhou
(China) Wang Guohua	148.5	5 April 1996	Asian Championships	Yachiyo
(China) Wang Guohua	150.0	12 May 1997	East Asian Games	Busan

=== Clean & jerk ===
Athlete	Record (kg)	Date	Meet	Place
World standard	175.0	11 November 1993	—	—
(Turkey) Naim Süleymanoğlu	177.5	14 November 1993	World Championships	Melbourne
(Turkey) Naim Süleymanoğlu	180.0	5 May 1994	European Championships	Sokolov
(Greece) Valerios Leonidis	180.5	20 November 1994	World Championships	Istanbul
(Turkey) Naim Süleymanoğlu	181.0	20 November 1994	World Championships	Istanbul
(Turkey) Naim Süleymanoğlu	182.5	20 November 1994	World Championships	Istanbul
(Greece) Valerios Leonidis	183.0	4 May 1995	European Championships	Warsaw
(Turkey) Naim Süleymanoğlu	185.0	22 July 1996	Olympic Games	Atlanta
(Greece) Valerios Leonidis	187.5	22 July 1996	Olympic Games	Atlanta

=== Total ===
Athlete	Record (kg)	Date	Meet	Place
World standard	315.0	11 November 1993	—	—
(Turkey) Naim Süleymanoğlu	322.5	14 November 1993	World Championships	Melbourne
(Turkey) Naim Süleymanoğlu	325.0	5 May 1994	European Championships	Sokolov
(Turkey) Naim Süleymanoğlu	327.5	20 November 1994	World Championships	Istanbul
(Turkey) Naim Süleymanoğlu	330.0	20 November 1994	World Championships	Istanbul
(Turkey) Naim Süleymanoğlu	332.5	22 July 1996	Olympic Games	Atlanta
(Turkey) Naim Süleymanoğlu	335.0	22 July 1996	Olympic Games	Atlanta

== 70 kg ==
=== Snatch ===
Athlete	Record (kg)	Date	Meet	Place
World standard	155.0	11 November 1993	—	—
(Armenia) Israel Militosyan	157.5	5 May 1994	European Championships	Sokolov
(Turkey) Fedail Güler	160.0	21 November 1994	World Championships	Istanbul
(China) Zhan Xugang	160.5	7 April 1996	Asian Championships	Yachiyo
(North Korea) Kim Myong-nam	161.0	7 April 1996	Asian Championships	Yachiyo
(China) Zhan Xugang	162.5	23 July 1996	Olympic Games	Atlanta
(China) Wan Jianhui	163.0	9 July 1997	Asian Championships	Yangzhou

=== Clean & jerk ===
Athlete	Record (kg)	Date	Meet	Place
World standard	190.0	11 November 1993	—	—
(Bulgaria) Yoto Yotov	192.5	5 May 1994	European Championships	Sokolov
(Turkey) Fedail Güler	193.0	4 May 1995	European Championships	Warsaw
(North Korea) Kim Myong-nam	193.5	7 April 1996	Asian Championships	Yachiyo
(China) Zhan Xugang	195.0	23 July 1996	Olympic Games	Atlanta
(China) Zhan Xugang	195.5	9 December 1997	World Championships	Chiang Mai

=== Total ===
Athlete	Record (kg)	Date	Meet	Place
World standard	342.5	11 November 1993	—	—
(Bulgaria) Yoto Yotov	345.0	5 May 1994	European Championships	Sokolov
(Turkey) Fedail Güler	350.0	21 November 1994	World Championships	Istanbul
(North Korea) Kim Myong-nam	352.5	7 April 1996	Asian Championships	Yachiyo
(China) Zhan Xugang	357.5	23 July 1996	Olympic Games	Atlanta

== 76 kg ==
=== Snatch ===
Athlete	Record (kg)	Date	Meet	Place
World standard	167.5	11 November 1993	—	—
(Ukraine) Ruslan Savchenko	170.0	16 November 1993	World Championships	Melbourne

=== Clean & jerk ===
Athlete	Record (kg)	Date	Meet	Place
World standard	200.0	11 November 1993	—	—
(Uzbekistan) Altymyrat Orazdurdyýew	202.5	16 November 1993	World Championships	Melbourne
(Cuba) Pablo Lara	205.0	25 November 1993		Ponce
(Cuba) Pablo Lara	205.5	14 March 1995	Pan American Games	Mar del Plata
(Cuba) Pablo Lara	207.5	14 March 1995	Pan American Games	Mar del Plata
(Cuba) Pablo Lara	208.0	20 April 1996	Szekszárd Cup	Szekszárd

=== Total ===
Athlete	Record (kg)	Date	Meet	Place
World standard	362.5	11 November 1993	—	—
(Ukraine) Ruslan Savchenko	370.0	16 November 1993	World Championships	Melbourne
(Cuba) Pablo Lara	372.5	20 April 1996	Szekszárd Cup	Szekszárd

== 83 kg ==
=== Snatch ===
Athlete	Record (kg)	Date	Meet	Place
World standard	175.0	11 November 1993	—	—
(Armenia) Sergo Chakhoyan	175.5	23 November 1994	World Championships	Istanbul
(Greece) Pyrros Dimas	176.0	5 May 1995	European Championships	Warsaw
(Greece) Pyrros Dimas	177.5	5 May 1995	European Championships	Warsaw
(Greece) Pyrros Dimas	180.0	26 July 1996	Olympic Games	Atlanta

=== Clean & jerk ===
Athlete	Record (kg)	Date	Meet	Place
World standard	207.5	11 November 1993	—	—
(Germany) Marc Huster	210.0	17 November 1993	World Championships	Melbourne
(Turkey) Sunay Bulut	210.5	23 November 1994	World Championships	Istanbul
(Greece) Pyrros Dimas	211.0	5 May 1995	European Championships	Warsaw
(Greece) Pyrros Dimas	212.5	22 November 1995	World Championships	Guangzhou
(Greece) Pyrros Dimas	213.0	26 July 1996	Olympic Games	Atlanta
(Germany) Marc Huster	213.5	26 July 1996	Olympic Games	Atlanta
(China) Zhang Yong	214.0	12 July 1997	Asian Championships	Yangzhou

=== Total ===
Athlete	Record (kg)	Date	Meet	Place
World standard	380.0	11 November 1993	—	—
(Germany) Marc Huster	382.5	17 November 1993	World Championships	Melbourne
(Greece) Pyrros Dimas	385.0	5 May 1995	European Championships	Warsaw
(Greece) Pyrros Dimas	387.5	5 May 1995	European Championships	Warsaw
(Greece) Pyrros Dimas	392.5	26 July 1996	Olympic Games	Atlanta

== 91 kg ==
=== Snatch ===
Athlete	Record (kg)	Date	Meet	Place
World standard	182.5	11 November 1993	—	—
(Bulgaria) Ivan Chakarov	185.0	18 November 1993	World Championships	Melbourne
(Georgia (country)) Kakhi Kakhiashvili	185.5	17 September 1994	World Cup Gala	Thessaloniki
(Russia) Aleksey Petrov	186.5	24 November 1994	World Championships	Istanbul
(Russia) Aleksey Petrov	187.5	27 July 1996	Olympic Games	Atlanta

=== Clean & jerk ===
Athlete	Record (kg)	Date	Meet	Place
World standard	222.5	11 November 1993	—	—
(Russia) Aleksey Petrov	227.5	7 May 1994	European Championships	Sokolov
(Russia) Aleksey Petrov	228.0	24 November 1994	World Championships	Istanbul
(Greece) Akakios Kakiasvilis	228.5	6 May 1995	European Championships	Warsaw

=== Total ===
Athlete	Record (kg)	Date	Meet	Place
World standard	402.5	11 November 1993	—	—
(Bulgaria) Ivan Chakarov	407.5	18 November 1993	World Championships	Melbourne
(Russia) Aleksey Petrov	412.5	7 May 1994	European Championships	Sokolov

== 99 kg ==
=== Snatch ===
Athlete	Record (kg)	Date	Meet	Place
World standard	187.5	11 November 1993	—	—
(Romania) Nicu Vlad	190.0	19 November 1993	World Championships	Melbourne
(Russia) Sergey Syrtsov	190.5	7 May 1994	European Championships	Sokolov
(Russia) Sergey Syrtsov	192.5	25 November 1994	World Championships	Istanbul

=== Clean & jerk ===
Athlete	Record (kg)	Date	Meet	Place
World standard	220.0	11 November 1993	—	—
(Russia) Viktor Tregubov	222.5	19 November 1993	World Championships	Melbourne
(Russia) Sergey Syrtsov	225.0	7 May 1994	European Championships	Sokolov
(Russia) Sergey Syrtsov	225.5	25 November 1994	World Championships	Istanbul
(Greece) Akakios Kakiasvilis	227.5	26 May 1995		Aarhus
(Kazakhstan) Anatoly Khrapaty	228.0	8 April 1996	Asian Championships	Yachiyo
(Greece) Akakios Kakiasvilis	235.0	28 July 1996	Olympic Games	Atlanta

=== Total ===
Athlete	Record (kg)	Date	Meet	Place
World standard	407.5	11 November 1993	—	—
(Russia) Sergey Syrtsov	410.0	7 May 1994	European Championships	Sokolov
(Russia) Sergey Syrtsov	415.0	7 May 1994	European Championships	Sokolov
(Russia) Sergey Syrtsov	417.5	25 November 1994	World Championships	Istanbul
(Greece) Akakios Kakiasvilis	420.0	28 July 1996	Olympic Games	Atlanta

== 108 kg ==
=== Snatch ===
Athlete	Record (kg)	Date	Meet	Place
World standard	197.5	11 November 1993	—	—
(Ukraine) Timur Taymazov	198.0	26 November 1994	World Championships	Istanbul
(Ukraine) Timur Taymazov	200.0	26 November 1994	World Championships	Istanbul

=== Clean & jerk ===
Athlete	Record (kg)	Date	Meet	Place
World standard	235.0	11 November 1993	—	—
(Ukraine) Timur Taymazov	235.5	8 May 1994	European Championships	Sokolov
(Ukraine) Timur Taymazov	236.0	29 July 1996	Olympic Games	Atlanta

=== Total ===
Athlete	Record (kg)	Date	Meet	Place
World standard	427.5	11 November 1993	—	—
(Ukraine) Timur Taymazov	430.0	8 May 1994	European Championships	Sokolov
(Ukraine) Timur Taymazov	435.0	26 November 1994	World Championships	Istanbul

== +108 kg ==
=== Snatch ===
Athlete	Record (kg)	Date	Meet	Place
World standard	197.5	11 November 1993	—	—
(Germany) Ronny Weller	200.0	21 November 1993	World Championships	Melbourne
(Russia) Andrey Chemerkin	200.5	8 May 1994	European Championships	Sokolov
(Belarus) Aleksandr Kurlovich	201.0	17 September 1994		Thessaloniki
(Belarus) Aleksandr Kurlovich	202.5	17 September 1994		Thessaloniki
(Belarus) Aleksandr Kurlovich	203.0	27 November 1994	World Championships	Istanbul
(Belarus) Aleksandr Kurlovich	205.0	27 November 1994	World Championships	Istanbul

=== Clean & jerk ===
Athlete	Record (kg)	Date	Meet	Place
World standard	240.0	11 November 1993	—	—
(Germany) Manfred Nerlinger	247.5	21 November 1993	World Championships	Melbourne
(Russia) Andrey Chemerkin	250.0	8 May 1994	European Championships	Sokolov
(Belarus) Aleksandr Kurlovich	250.5	27 November 1994	World Championships	Istanbul
(Russia) Andrey Chemerkin	252.5	27 November 1994	World Championships	Istanbul
(Belarus) Aleksandr Kurlovich	253.0	27 November 1994	World Championships	Istanbul
(Russia) Andrey Chemerkin	253.5	7 May 1995	European Championships	Warsaw
(Germany) Ronny Weller	255.0	30 July 1996	Olympic Games	Atlanta
(Russia) Andrey Chemerkin	260.0	30 July 1996	Olympic Games	Atlanta
(Russia) Andrey Chemerkin	262.5	14 December 1997	World Championships	Chiang Mai

=== Total ===
Athlete	Record (kg)	Date	Meet	Place
World standard	427.5	11 November 1993	—	—
(Germany) Ronny Weller	442.5	21 November 1993	World Championships	Melbourne
(Russia) Andrey Chemerkin	450.0	8 May 1994	European Championships	Sokolov
(Belarus) Aleksandr Kurlovich	455.0	27 November 1994	World Championships	Istanbul
(Belarus) Aleksandr Kurlovich	457.5	27 November 1994	World Championships	Istanbul
(Russia) Andrey Chemerkin	462.5	14 December 1997	World Championships	Chiang Mai

== See also ==
- World record progression men's weightlifting
- World record progression men's weightlifting (1998–2018)
- World record progression women's weightlifting
- World record progression women's weightlifting (1998–2018)
