= 1997 World Weightlifting Championships – Men's 91 kg =

The 1997 World Weightlifting Championships were held in Chiang Mai, Thailand from December 6 to December 14. The men's competition in the 91 kg division was staged on 12 December 1997.

== Medalists ==
Event	Gold		Silver		Bronze	
Snatch	Tadeusz Drzazga (POL)	177.5 kg	Maksim Agapitov (RUS)	175.0 kg	Andrey Makarov (KAZ)	170.0 kg
Clean & Jerk	Julio Luna (VEN)	212.5 kg	Maksim Agapitov (RUS)	205.0 kg	Oleh Chumak (UKR)	200.0 kg
Total	Maksim Agapitov (RUS)	380.0 kg	Tadeusz Drzazga (POL)	377.5 kg	Julio Luna (VEN)	377.5 kg

== Records ==
Prior to this competition, the existing world records were as follows.

World record	Snatch	Aleksey Petrov (RUS)	187.5 kg	Atlanta, United States	27 July 1996
World record	Clean & jerk	Akakios Kakiasvilis (GRE)	228.5 kg	Warsaw, Poland	6 May 1995
World record	Total	Aleksey Petrov (RUS)	412.5 kg	Sokolov, Czech Republic	7 May 1994

== Results ==
Rank	Athlete	Body weight	Snatch (kg)				Clean & Jerk (kg)				Total
Rank	Athlete	Body weight	1	2	3	Rank	1	2	3	Rank	Total
1st place, gold medalist(s)	Maksim Agapitov (RUS)	90.65	170.0	175.0	~~177.5~~	2nd place, silver medalist(s)	~~200.0~~	200.0	205.0	2nd place, silver medalist(s)	380.0
2nd place, silver medalist(s)	Tadeusz Drzazga (POL)	89.40	167.5	172.5	177.5	1st place, gold medalist(s)	200.0	~~205.0~~	~~205.0~~	4	377.5
3rd place, bronze medalist(s)	Julio Luna (VEN)	90.75	~~160.0~~	160.0	165.0	5	~~210.0~~	~~210.0~~	212.5	1st place, gold medalist(s)	377.5
4	Andrey Makarov (KAZ)	90.25	160.0	165.0	170.0	3rd place, bronze medalist(s)	190.0	195.0	200.0	7	370.0
5	Lars Betker (GER)	89.95	157.5	162.5	165.0	4	200.0	~~205.0~~	~~207.5~~	6	365.0
6	Oleh Chumak (UKR)	88.90	~~162.5~~	~~162.5~~	162.5	6	200.0	~~207.5~~	~~207.5~~	3rd place, bronze medalist(s)	362.5
7	Bünyamin Sudaş (TUR)	89.90	~~157.5~~	157.5	162.5	7	195.0	~~200.0~~	200.0	5	362.5
8	Kiril Kounev (AUS)	90.90	~~155.0~~	155.0	160.0	9	195.0	200.0	~~205.0~~	8	360.0
9	Qin Guang (CHN)	87.10	155.0	160.0	~~165.0~~	8	~~195.0~~	195.0	~~202.5~~	9	355.0
10	Sergejs Lazovskis (LAT)	90.55	~~147.5~~	147.5	152.5	11	190.0	195.0	~~197.5~~	10	347.5
11	Jaroslav Jokeľ (SVK)	90.75	150.0	~~155.0~~	155.0	10	180.0	187.5	190.0	13	345.0
12	Jürgen Matzku (AUT)	90.75	~~152.5~~	152.5	~~160.0~~	12	~~190.0~~	190.0	~~195.0~~	12	342.5
13	Fazilbek Urazimbetov (UZB)	87.15	150.0	~~155.0~~	~~155.0~~	13	185.0	~~190.0~~	190.0	11	340.0
14	Khaled Korany (EGY)	90.90	145.0	~~150.0~~	~~150.0~~	19	~~182.5~~	185.0	190.0	14	335.0
15	Leon Griffin (GBR)	86.85	~~145.0~~	145.0	~~150.0~~	17	180.0	185.0	~~190.0~~	15	330.0
16	Ulugbek Mahmudov (UZB)	90.85	150.0	~~155.0~~	~~155.0~~	16	180.0	~~190.0~~	~~190.0~~	17	330.0
17	Simon Heffernan (AUS)	89.95	140.0	145.0	~~150.0~~	18	175.0	180.0	~~187.5~~	16	325.0
18	Aran Boonlue (THA)	90.20	130.0	~~135.0~~	~~135.0~~	20	170.0	175.0	—	18	305.0
—	Ahmed Shahbazov (AZE)	88.90	~~150.0~~	~~150.0~~	150.0	14	~~190.0~~	~~190.0~~	~~190.0~~	—	—
—	Saleh Mohammed (IRQ)	89.95	150.0	~~155.0~~	~~155.0~~	15	~~185.0~~	~~185.0~~	~~185.0~~	—	—
—	Francesco De Tommaso (ITA)	90.10	~~152.5~~	~~152.5~~	~~152.5~~	—	—	—	—	—	—
—	Carlos Hernández (CUB)	90.55	~~167.5~~	—	—	—	—	—	—	—	—
DQ	Vadim Vacarciuc (MDA)	88.85	165.0	170.0	175.0	—	207.5	212.5	—	—	—
DQ	Sunay Bulut (TUR)	91.00	167.5	~~172.5~~	172.5	—	207.5	~~210.0~~	210.0	—	—
