= List of Hungarian records in Olympic weightlifting =

The following are the national records in Olympic weightlifting in Hungary. Records are maintained in each weight class for the snatch lift, clean and jerk lift, and the total for both lifts by the Magyar Sportlövők Szövetsége (MSSZ).

== Current records ==
=== Men ===
| Event | Record | Athlete | Date | Meet | Place | Ref |
60 kg
| Snatch | 105 kg | Standard | | | | |
| Clean & Jerk | 128 kg | Standard | | | | |
| Total | 233 kg | Standard | | | | |
65 kg
| Snatch | 112 kg | Standard | | | | |
| Clean & Jerk | 137 kg | Standard | | | | |
| Total | 249 kg | Standard | | | | |
70 kg
| Snatch | 118 kg | Standard | | | | |
| Clean & Jerk | 145 kg | Standard | | | | |
| Total | 263 kg | Standard | | | | |
75 kg
| Snatch | 132 kg | Lajos Újvári | 16 October 2026 | European U23 Championships | Durrës, Albania | |
| Clean & Jerk | 164 kg | Lajos Újvári | 8 September 2026 | World University Championship | Doha, Qatar | |
| Total | 295 kg | Lajos Újvári | 8 September 2026 | World University Championship | Doha, Qatar | |
85 kg
| Snatch | 135 kg | Lajos Újvári | 14 March 2026 | Savaria Cup | Szombathely, Hungary | |
| Clean & Jerk | 165 kg | Lajos Újvári | 14 March 2026 | Savaria Cup | Szombathely, Hungary | |
| Total | 300 kg | Lajos Újvári | 14 March 2026 | Savaria Cup | Szombathely, Hungary | |
95 kg
| Snatch | 147 kg | Szilárd Fekécs | 4 November 2026 | World Championships | Ningbo, China | |
| Clean & Jerk | 184 kg | Szilárd Fekécs | 4 November 2026 | World Championships | Ningbo, China | |
| Total | 331 kg | Szilárd Fekécs | 4 November 2026 | World Championships | Ningbo, China | |
110 kg
| Snatch | 148 kg | Ferenc Gyurkovics | 24 June 2026 | | Waregem, Belgium | |
| Clean & Jerk | 182 kg | Ferenc Gyurkovics | 10 September 2025 | World Masters Championships | Las Vegas, United States | |
| Total | 329 kg | Ferenc Gyurkovics | 10 September 2025 | World Masters Championships | Las Vegas, United States | |
+110 kg
| Snatch | 155 kg | Standard | | | | |
| Clean & Jerk | 190 kg | Standard | | | | |
| Total | 345 kg | Standard | | | | |

=== Women ===
| Event | Record | Athlete | Date | Meet | Place | Ref |
49 kg
| Snatch | 74 kg | Cintia Árva | 26 September 2026 | Cup of the Blue Swords | Meissen, Germany | |
| Clean & Jerk | 97 kg | Cintia Árva | 26 September 2026 | Cup of the Blue Swords | Meissen, Germany | |
| Total | 171 kg | Cintia Árva | 26 September 2026 | Cup of the Blue Swords | Meissen, Germany | |
53 kg
| Snatch | 75 kg | Standard | | | | |
| Clean & Jerk | 97 kg | Cintia Árva | 5 July 2025 | | Nyíregyháza, Hungary | |
| Total | 172 kg | Standard | | | | |
57 kg
| Snatch | 81 kg | Standard | | | | |
| Clean & Jerk | 99 kg | Standard | | | | |
| Total | 180 kg | Standard | | | | |
61 kg
| Snatch | 85 kg | Standard | | | | |
| Clean & Jerk | 103 kg | Standard | | | | |
| Total | 188 kg | Standard | | | | |
69 kg
| Snatch | 93 kg | Luca Kapitány | 14 March 2026 | | Szombathely, Hungary | |
| Clean & Jerk | 110 kg | Luca Kapitány | 23 November 2025 | Hungarian Championships | Nyíregyháza, Hungary | |
| Total | 202 kg | Luca Kapitány | 14 March 2026 | | Szombathely, Hungary | |
77 kg
| Snatch | 94 kg | Standard | | | | |
| Clean & Jerk | 114 kg | Standard | | | | |
| Total | 208 kg | Standard | | | | |
86 kg
| Snatch | 106 kg | Veronika Mitykó | 23 November 2025 | Hungarian Championships | Nyíregyháza, Hungary | |
| Clean & Jerk | 119 kg | Veronika Mitykó | 6 November 2026 | World Championships | Ningbo, China | |
| Total | 223 kg | Veronika Mitykó | 23 November 2025 | Hungarian Championships | Nyíregyháza, Hungary | |
+86 kg
| Snatch | 108 kg | Veronika Mitykó | 11 October 2025 | World Championships | Førde, Norway | |
| Clean & Jerk | 127 kg | Standard | | | | |
| Total | 230 kg | Veronika Mitykó | 11 October 2025 | World Championships | Førde, Norway | |

== Historical records ==
=== Men (2025–2026) ===
| Event | Record | Athlete | Date | Meet | Place | Ref |
60 kg
| Snatch | 99 kg | Botond Molnár | 23 May 2026 | | Zalaegerszeg, Hungary | |
| Clean & Jerk | 122 kg | Noel Fekécs | 4 July 2025 | | Nyíregyháza, Hungary | |
| Total | 218 kg | Botond Molnár | 23 May 2026 | | Zalaegerszeg, Hungary | |
65 kg
| Snatch | 102 kg | Standard | | | | |
| Clean & Jerk | 128 kg | Noel Fekécs | 21 March 2026 | | Téglás, Hungary | |
| Total | 229 kg | Standard | | | | |
71 kg
| Snatch | 120 kg | Gábor Bunász | 2 August 2025 | István Messzi Memorial | Kecskemét, Hungary | |
| Clean & Jerk | 144 kg | Vilmos Marcell Bojti | 22 November 2025 | Hungarian Championships | Nyíregyháza, Hungary | |
| Total | 260 kg | Gábor Bunász | 2 August 2025 | István Messzi Memorial | Kecskemét, Hungary | |
79 kg
| Snatch | 135 kg | Lajos Újvári | 14 March 2026 | Savaria Cup | Szombathely, Hungary | |
| Clean & Jerk | 165 kg | Lajos Újvári | 14 March 2026 | Savaria Cup | Szombathely, Hungary | |
| Total | 300 kg | Lajos Újvári | 14 March 2026 | Savaria Cup | Szombathely, Hungary | |
88 kg
| Snatch | 141 kg | Szilárd Fekécs | 2 August 2025 | István Messzi Memorial | Kecskemét, Hungary | |
| Clean & Jerk | 179 kg | Szilárd Fekécs | 2 November 2025 | European U23 Championships | Durrës, Albania | |
| Total | 319 kg | Szilárd Fekécs | 2 November 2025 | European U23 Championships | Durrës, Albania | |
94 kg
| Snatch | 144 kg | Szilárd Fekécs | 24 April 2026 | European Championships | Batumi, Georgia | |
| Clean & Jerk | 182 kg | Szilárd Fekécs | 14 March 2026 | Savaria Cup | Szombathely, Hungary | |
| Total | 325 kg | Szilárd Fekécs | 14 March 2026 | Savaria Cup | Szombathely, Hungary | |
110 kg
| Snatch | 148 kg | Ferenc Gyurkovics | 24 June 2026 | | Waregem, Belgium | |
| Clean & Jerk | 182 kg | Ferenc Gyurkovics | 10 September 2025 | World Masters Championships | Las Vegas, United States | |
| Total | 329 kg | Ferenc Gyurkovics | 10 September 2025 | World Masters Championships | Las Vegas, United States | |
+110 kg
| Snatch | 143 kg | Péter Nagy | 23 November 2025 | Hungarian Championships | Nyíregyháza, Hungary | |
| Clean & Jerk | 188 kg | Levente Lucz | 4 November 2025 | European U23 Championships | Durrës, Albania | |
| Total | 327 kg | Levente Lucz | 4 November 2025 | European U23 Championships | Durrës, Albania | |

=== Men (2018–2025) ===
| Event | Record | Athlete | Date | Meet | Place | Ref |
55 kg
| Snatch | 105 kg | Standard | , | | | |
| Clean & Jerk | 127 kg | Standard | | | | |
| Total | 232 kg | Standard | | | | |
61 kg
| Snatch | 117 kg | Standard | | | | |
| Clean & Jerk | 143 kg | Standard | | | | |
| Total | 257 kg | Standard | | | | |
67 kg
| Snatch | 122 kg | Standard | | | | |
| Clean & Jerk | 156 kg | Standard | | | | |
| Total | 278 kg | Standard | | | | |
73 kg
| Snatch | 135 kg | Standard | | | | |
| Clean & Jerk | 160 kg | Standard | | | | |
| Total | 295 kg | Standard | | | | |
81 kg
| Snatch | 142 kg | Máté Kmegy | 16 February 2019 | Péter Baczakó Memorial | Budapest, Hungary | |
| Clean & Jerk | 176 kg | Máté Kmegy | 10 April 2019 | European Championships | Batumi, Georgia | |
| Total | 316 kg | Máté Kmegy | 10 April 2019 | European Championships | Batumi, Georgia | |
89 kg
| Snatch | 149 kg | Standard | | | | |
| Clean & Jerk | 180 kg | Standard | | | | |
| Total | 329 kg | Standard | | | | |
96 kg
| Snatch | 153 kg | Standard | | | | |
| Clean & Jerk | 186 kg | Standard | | | | |
| Total | 339 kg | Standard | | | | |
102 kg
| Snatch | 156 kg | Standard | | | | |
| Clean & Jerk | 191 kg | Standard | | | | |
| Total | 347 kg | Standard | | | | |
109 kg
| Snatch | 160 kg | Standard | | | | |
| Clean & Jerk | 194 kg | Standard | | | | |
| Total | 354 kg | Standard | | | | |
+109 kg
| Snatch | 187 kg | Péter Nagy | 10 November 2018 | World Championships | Ashgabat, Turkmenistan | |
| Clean & Jerk | 226 kg | Péter Nagy | 10 November 2018 | World Championships | Ashgabat, Turkmenistan | |
| Total | 413 kg | Péter Nagy | 10 November 2018 | World Championships | Ashgabat, Turkmenistan | |

=== Men (1998–2018) ===
| Event | Record | Athlete | Date | Meet | Place | Ref |
-56 kg
| Snatch | 122,5 kg | László Tancsics | 17 April 2004 | European Championships | Kyiv, Ukraine | |
| Clean & Jerk | 150 kg | László Tancsics | 15 August 2004 | Olympic Games | Athens, Greece | |
| Total | 272,5 kg | László Tancsics | 15 August 2004 | Olympic Games | Athens, Greece | |
-62 kg
| Snatch | 138 kg | Zoltán Farkas | 25 September 1999 | | | |
| Clean & Jerk | 165 kg | Zoltán Farkas | 12 September 1998 | | | |
| Total | 302,5 kg | Zoltán Farkas | 11 November 1998 | World Championships | Lahti, Finland | |
-69 kg
| Snatch | 150 kg | Gábor Molnár | 9 May 1998 | World Cup | Szekszárd, Hungary | |
| Clean & Jerk | 183 kg | Gábor Molnár | 5 June 1999 | Soroksár Cup | Budapest, Hungary | |
| Total | 322,5 kg | Gábor Molnár | 5 June 1999 | Soroksár Cup | Budapest, Hungary | |
-77 kg
| Snatch | 160 kg | Attila Feri | 7 November 2001 | World Championships | Antalya, Turkey | |
| Clean & Jerk | 201 kg | Adrián Popa | 6 May 2000 | | | |
| Total | 360 kg | Attila Feri | 7 November 2001 | World Championships | Antalya, Turkey | |
-85 kg
| Snatch | 170 kg | György Ehrlich | 26 September 1999 | | | |
| Clean & Jerk | 201 kg | János Baranyai | 15 April 2011 | European Championships | Kazan, Russia | |
| Total | 362,5 kg | György Ehrlich | 26 September 1999 | | | |
-94 kg
| Snatch | 180 kg | Zoltán Kovács | 24 September 2000 | Olympic Games | Sydney, Australia | |
| Clean & Jerk | 222,5 kg | Zoltán Kovács | 6 May 2000 | | | |
| Total | 397,5 kg | Zoltán Kovács | 24 September 2000 | Olympic Games | Sydney, Australia | |
-105 kg
| Snatch | 187,5 kg | Ferenc Gyurkovics | 21 November 2003 | World Championships | Vancouver, Canada | |
| Clean & Jerk | 230 kg | Zoltán Kovács | 29 April 2001 | European Championships | Trenčín, Slovakia | |
| Total | 412,5 kg | Zoltán Kovács | 29 April 2001 | European Championships | Trenčín, Slovakia | |
+105 kg
| Snatch | 195 kg | Attila Likerecz | 4 December 1999 | | | |
| Clean & Jerk | 233 kg | Péter Nagy | 20 March 2016 | 6th Presidents Cup | Kazan, Russia | |
| Total | 425 kg | Tibor Stark | 26 September 2000 | Olympic Games | Sydney, Australia | |

=== Women (2025–2026) ===
| Event | Record | Athlete | Date | Meet | Place | Ref |
48 kg
| Snatch | 72 kg | Cintia Árva | 14 March 2026 | Savaria Cup | Szombathely, Hungary | |
| Clean & Jerk | 95 kg | Cintia Árva | 14 March 2026 | Savaria Cup | Szombathely, Hungary | |
| Total | 167 kg | Cintia Árva | 14 March 2026 | Savaria Cup | Szombathely, Hungary | |
53 kg
| Snatch | 73 kg | Cintia Árva | 5 July 2025 | | Nyíregyháza, Hungary | |
| Clean & Jerk | 97 kg | Cintia Árva | 5 July 2025 | | Nyíregyháza, Hungary | |
| Total | 170 kg | Cintia Árva | 5 July 2025 | | Nyíregyháza, Hungary | |
58 kg
| Snatch | 73 kg | Karina Kecskés | 5 July 2025 | | Nyíregyháza, Hungary | |
| Clean & Jerk | 97 kg | Karina Kecskés | 5 July 2025 | | Nyíregyháza, Hungary | |
| Total | 170 kg | Karina Kecskés | 5 July 2025 | | Nyíregyháza, Hungary | |
63 kg
| Snatch | 79 kg | Katalin Kasza | 14 March 2026 | Savaria Cup | Szombathely, Hungary | |
| Clean & Jerk | 97 kg | Mira Varga | 14 March 2026 | Savaria Cup | Szombathely, Hungary | |
| Total | 172 kg | Katalin Kasza | 14 March 2026 | Savaria Cup | Szombathely, Hungary | |
69 kg
| Snatch | 93 kg | Luca Kapitány | 14 March 2026 | | Szombathely, Hungary | |
| Clean & Jerk | 110 kg | Luca Kapitány | 23 November 2025 | Hungarian Championships | Nyíregyháza, Hungary | |
| Total | 202 kg | Luca Kapitány | 14 March 2026 | | Szombathely, Hungary | |
77 kg
| Snatch | 93 kg | Luca Kapitány | 13 June 2026 | | Kisbér, Hungary | |
| Clean & Jerk | 108 kg | Luca Kapitány | 13 June 2026 | | Kisbér, Hungary | |
| Total | 201 kg | Luca Kapitány | 13 June 2026 | | Kisbér, Hungary | |
86 kg
| Snatch | 106 kg | Veronika Mitykó | 23 November 2025 | Hungarian Championships | Nyíregyháza, Hungary | |
| Clean & Jerk | 118 kg | Veronika Mitykó | 14 February 2026 | | Budapest, Hungary | |
| Total | 223 kg | Veronika Mitykó | 23 November 2025 | Hungarian Championships | Nyíregyháza, Hungary | |
+86 kg
| Snatch | 108 kg | Veronika Mitykó | 11 October 2025 | World Championships | Førde, Norway | |
| Clean & Jerk | 122 kg | Veronika Mitykó | 11 October 2025 | World Championships | Førde, Norway | |
| Total | 230 kg | Veronika Mitykó | 11 October 2025 | World Championships | Førde, Norway | |

=== Women (2018–2025) ===
| Event | Record | Athlete | Date | Meet | Place | Ref |
45 kg
| Snatch | 66 kg | Standard | | | | |
| Clean & Jerk | 83 kg | Standard | | | | |
| Total | 149 kg | Standard | | | | |
49 kg
| Snatch | 72 kg | Standard | | | | |
| Clean & Jerk | 91 kg | Standard | | | | |
| Total | 163 kg | Standard | | | | |
55 kg
| Snatch | 82 kg | Standard | | | | |
| Clean & Jerk | 98 kg | Standard | | | | |
| Total | 180 kg | Standard | | | | |
59 kg
| Snatch | 89 kg | Standard | | | | |
| Clean & Jerk | 101 kg | Cintia Andrea Árva | 17 April 2023 | European Championships | Yerevan, Armenia | |
| Total | 189 kg | Standard | | | | |
64 kg
| Snatch | 93 kg | Standard | | | | |
| Clean & Jerk | 106 kg | Standard | | | | |
| Total | 199 kg | Standard | | | | |
71 kg
| Snatch | 95 kg | Standard | | | | |
| Clean & Jerk | 114 kg | Standard | | | | |
| Total | 209 kg | Standard | | | | |
76 kg
| Snatch | 98 kg | Standard | | | | |
| Clean & Jerk | 120 kg | Laura Horvath | 19 November 2023 | Hungarian Championships | Nyíregyháza, Hungary | |
| Total | 215 kg | Laura Horvath | 19 November 2023 | Hungarian Championships | Nyíregyháza, Hungary | |
81 kg
| Snatch | 100 kg | Standard | | | | |
| Clean & Jerk | 118 kg | Standard | | | | |
| Total | 218 kg | Standard | | | | |
87 kg
| Snatch | 103 kg | Veronika Mitykó | 9 April 2024 | World Cup | Phuket, Thailand | |
| Clean & Jerk | 121 kg | Standard | | | | |
| Total | 222 kg | Standard | | | | |
+87 kg
| Snatch | 104 kg | Standard | | | | |
| Clean & Jerk | 124 kg | Standard | | | | |
| Total | 228 kg | Standard | | | | |

=== Women (1998–2018) ===
| Event | Record | Athlete | Date | Meet | Place | Ref |
48 kg
| Snatch | 72,5 kg | Csilla Földi | 16 October 1999 | | | |
| Clean & Jerk | 92,5 kg | Anikó Ajkay | 12 September 1998 | | | |
| Total | 165 kg | Anikó Ajkay | 12 September 1998 | | | |
53 kg
| Snatch | 77,5 kg | Anikó Ajkay | 13 March 1999 | | | |
| Clean & Jerk | 105 kg | Anikó Ajkay | 16 March 2001 | | | |
| Total | 182,5 kg | Anikó Ajkay | 16 March 2001 | | | |
58 kg
| Snatch | 97,5 kg | Henrietta Ráki | 26 June 2004 | | | |
| Clean & Jerk | 115 kg | Henrietta Ráki | 19 November 2002 | World Championships | Warsaw, Poland | |
| Total | 207,5 kg | Henrietta Ráki | 19 November 2002 | World Championships | Warsaw, Poland | |
63 kg
| Snatch | 102,5 kg | Eszter Krutzler | 3 July 2001 | Junior World Championships | Thessaloniki, Greece | |
| Clean and jerk | 127,5 kg | Eszter Krutzler | 3 July 2001 | Junior World Championships | Thessaloniki, Greece | |
| Total | 230 kg | Eszter Krutzler | 3 July 2001 | Junior World Championships | Thessaloniki, Greece | |
69 kg
| Snatch | 117,5 kg | Eszter Krutzler | 16 November 2003 | World Championships | Vancouver, Canada | |
| Clean and jerk | 145 kg | Eszter Krutzler | 16 November 2003 | World Championships | Vancouver, Canada | |
| Total | 262,5 kg | Eszter Krutzler | 16 November 2003 | World Championships | Vancouver, Canada | |
75 kg
| Snatch | 116 kg | Gyöngyi Likerecz | 10 November 2001 | World Championships | Antalya, Turkey | |
| Clean and jerk | 143 kg | Gyöngyi Likerecz | 4 June 2002 | Junior World Championship | Havířov, Czech Republic | |
| Total | 255 kg | Gyöngyi Likerecz | 10 November 2001 | World Championships | Antalya, Turkey | |
90 kg
| Snatch | 115 kg | Standard | | | | |
| Clean and jerk | 130 kg | Standard | | | | |
| Total | 245 kg | Standard | | | | |
+90 kg
| Snatch | 127,5 kg | Viktória Varga | 21 August 2004 | Olympic Games | Athens, Greece | |
| Clean and jerk | 155 kg | Viktória Varga | 28 April 2002 | European Championships | Antalya, Turkey | |
| Total | 282,5 kg | Viktória Varga | 21 August 2004 | Olympic Games | Athens, Greece | |
