= Zoltán Farkas (weightlifter) =

Hungarian weightlifter (born 1974)

Personal information
- Nationality: Hungarian
- Born: Zoltán Farkas; 19 November 1974 (age 51) Sovata

Sport
- Country: Hungary
- Sport: Weightlifting
- Event: –62kg
- Club: Nyíregyházi Vasutas Sport Club
Medal record
Men's Weightlifting
Representing Hungary
European Championships
Silver medal – second place	1997 Rijeka	64 kg

Zoltán Farkas (born 19 November 1974 in Sovata) is a Hungarian weightlifter. He holds the 69 kg Hungarian record. He competed in two Olympic Games. In Atlanta he finished in the 8th place in 59 kg category, four years later in Sydney he placed 10th in 62 kg category.

== Sporting career ==
Farkas won three silver medals (snatch, clean & jerk, total) at the 1997 European Weightlifting Championships in Rijeka. One year later he won bronze medal in snatch at the European Championships.

== Major results ==
Year	Venue	Weight	Snatch (kg)					Clean & Jerk (kg)					Total	Rank
Year	Venue	Weight	1	2	3	Result	Rank	1	2	3	Result	Rank	Total	Rank
Representing Hungary
Olympic Games
2000	Sydney, Australia	62 kg	127.5	132.5	~~135.0~~	132.5	9	155.0	~~160.0~~	~~160.0~~	155.0	12	287.5	10
1996	Atlanta, United States	59 kg	130.0	~~132.5~~	~~132.5~~	130.0	9	140.0	145.0	150.0	150.0	9	280.0	8
World Championships
2003	Vancouver, Canada	69 kg	135.0	140.0	~~142.5~~	140.0	16	~~165.0~~	165.0	167.5	167.5	22	307.5	17
2001	Antalya, Turkey	69 kg	—	—	—	—	—	—	—	—	—	—	—	DNS
1999	Athens, Greece	62 kg	132.5	~~137.5~~	~~137.5~~	132.5	11	152.5	~~160.0~~	160.0	160.0	14	292.5	11
1998	Lahti, Finland	62 kg	~~132.5~~	132.5	137.5	137.5	8	~~160.0~~	160.0	165.0	165.0	6	302.5	7
1997	Chiang Mai, Thailand	64 kg	~~137.5~~	~~137.5~~	~~137.5~~	—	—	160.0	~~165.0~~	~~165.0~~	160.0	8	—	—
1995	Guangzhou, China	59 kg	—N/a	—N/a	—N/a	127.5	—N/a	—N/a	—N/a	—N/a	157.5	—N/a	285.0	10
European Championships
2002	Antalya, Turkey	69 kg	140.0	~~145.0~~	~~147.5~~	140.0	9	165.0	170.0	~~175.0~~	170.0	11	310.0	9
1999	La Coruña, Spain	62 kg	~~130.0~~	~~130.0~~	~~130.0~~	—	—	—	—	—	—	—	—	—
1998	Riesa, Germany	62 kg	~~130.0~~	~~130.0~~	130.0	130.0	3rd place, bronze medalist(s)	155.0	~~160.0~~	160.0	160.0	4	290.0	4
1997	Rijeka, Croatia	64 kg	135.0	140.0	~~142.5~~	140.0	2nd place, silver medalist(s)	160.0	165.0	~~170.0~~	165.0	2nd place, silver medalist(s)	305.0	2nd place, silver medalist(s)
1995	Warsaw, Poland	59 kg	—N/a	—N/a	—N/a	130.0	4	—N/a	—N/a	—N/a	150.0	7	280.0	6
1994	Sokolov, Czech Republic	59 kg	—N/a	—N/a	—N/a	122.5	7	—N/a	—N/a	—N/a	150.0	8	272.5	7
