= 1997 World Weightlifting Championships – Men's 64 kg =

The 1997 World Weightlifting Championships were held in Chiang Mai, Thailand from December 6 to December 14. The men's competition in the 64 kg division was staged on 8 December 1997.

== Medalists ==
Event	Gold		Silver		Bronze	
Snatch	Wang Guohua (CHN)	147.5 kg	Hafız Süleymanoğlu (TUR)	145.0 kg	Xiao Jiangang (CHN)	142.5 kg
Clean & Jerk	Xiao Jiangang (CHN)	175.0 kg	Asif Malikov (AZE)	172.5 kg	Valentin Sarov (BUL)	170.0 kg
Total	Xiao Jiangang (CHN)	317.5 kg	Hafız Süleymanoğlu (TUR)	315.0 kg	Asif Malikov (AZE)	305.0 kg

== Records ==
Prior to this competition, the existing world records were as follows.

World record	Snatch	Wang Guohua (CHN)	150.0 kg	Busan, South Korea	12 May 1997
World record	Clean & Jerk	Valerios Leonidis (GRE)	187.5 kg	Atlanta, United States	22 July 1996
World record	Total	Naim Süleymanoğlu (TUR)	335.0 kg	Atlanta, United States	22 July 1996

== Results ==
Rank	Athlete	Body weight	Snatch (kg)				Clean & Jerk (kg)				Total
Rank	Athlete	Body weight	1	2	3	Rank	1	2	3	Rank	Total
1st place, gold medalist(s)	Xiao Jiangang (CHN)	63.80	137.5	142.5	~~145.0~~	3rd place, bronze medalist(s)	175.0	~~180.0~~	~~180.0~~	1st place, gold medalist(s)	317.5
2nd place, silver medalist(s)	Hafız Süleymanoğlu (TUR)	63.50	140.0	142.5	145.0	2nd place, silver medalist(s)	165.0	170.0	~~172.5~~	4	315.0
3rd place, bronze medalist(s)	Asif Malikov (AZE)	63.15	~~132.5~~	132.5	~~137.5~~	8	167.5	172.5	~~175.0~~	2nd place, silver medalist(s)	305.0
4	Valentin Sarov (BUL)	63.25	135.0	~~140.0~~	~~140.0~~	4	~~160.0~~	160.0	170.0	3rd place, bronze medalist(s)	305.0
5	Mücahit Yağcı (TUR)	63.35	130.0	~~135.0~~	135.0	5	~~160.0~~	165.0	~~172.5~~	5	300.0
6	Yoshihisa Miyaji (JPN)	63.90	135.0	~~140.0~~	~~140.0~~	7	160.0	~~165.0~~	~~167.5~~	9	295.0
7	Yosri Shalaly (EGY)	64.00	122.5	~~127.5~~	127.5	9	155.0	160.0	165.0	6	292.5
8	Marcus Stephen (NRU)	63.45	120.0	~~125.0~~	~~125.0~~	10	162.5	~~167.5~~	~~167.5~~	7	282.5
9	Mohd Hidayat Hamidon (MAS)	63.85	120.0	~~125.0~~	~~125.0~~	11	155.0	~~162.5~~	~~162.5~~	10	275.0
10	Kamaruzaman Jusan (MAS)	63.65	115.0	~~120.0~~	~~120.0~~	12	135.0	140.0	~~142.5~~	11	255.0
—	Wang Guohua (CHN)	64.00	142.5	145.0	147.5	1st place, gold medalist(s)	~~165.0~~	~~165.0~~	~~165.0~~	—	—
—	Marian Dodiță (ROM)	63.55	130.0	135.0	~~140.0~~	6	~~162.5~~	~~162.5~~	~~162.5~~	—	—
—	Zoltán Farkas (HUN)	63.90	~~137.5~~	~~137.5~~	~~137.5~~	—	160.0	~~165.0~~	~~165.0~~	8	—
