= Dudas =

Dudas, Dudás, Dudaš or Dudáš may refer to:

== People ==
- Ádám Dudás (born 1989), Hungarian footballer
- Eszter Dudás, Hungarian professional triathlete
- Gordan Dudas (born 1971), German polotician
- Gyula Dudás (born 1966), Hungarian walker
- István Dudás (weightlifter) (born 1971), Hungarian weightlifter
- Ištvan Dudaš (born 1973), Serbian footballer
- Jon Dudas, former under Secretary of Commerce for Intellectual Property and Director of the United States Patent and Trademark Office
- János Dudás (1911–1979), Hungarian footballer
- Jesse Dudas (born 1988), Canadian-Hungarian ice hockey defenceman
- József Dudás, Hungarian resistance leader
- Juraj Dudáš (born 1963), Slovak weightlifter
- Laura Dudas (born 1978), Canadian politician
- Martin Dudáš (born 1987), Czech ice hockey defenceman
- Mihail Dudaš (born 1989), Serbian decathlete and heptathlete
- Miklós Dudás (bishop) (1902–1972), Hungarian Greek Catholic bishop
- Miklós Dudás (canoeist) (1991–2026), Hungarian sprint canoeist
- Róbert Dudás (born 1973), Hungarian political scientist and politician
- Zoltán Dudás (1933–1989), Hungarian footballer

== Others ==
- Dūdas, Baltic bagpipe

== See also ==
- Dudaş (disambiguation)
