= Edward Silva =

Uruguayan weightlifter

Personal information
- Born: 31 August 1975 (age 50)
- Weight: 74.25 kg (163.7 lb)

Sport
- Country: Uruguay
- Sport: Weightlifting
- Weight class: 76 kg
- Team: National team
- Updated on 5 October 2016

Edward Silva (born 31 August 1975) is a Uruguayan male weightlifter, competing in the 76 kg category and representing Uruguay at international competitions. He participated at the 1996 Summer Olympics in the 76 kg event. He competed at world championships, most recently at the 1997 World Weightlifting Championships.

== Major results ==
Year	Venue	Weight	Snatch (kg)				Clean & Jerk (kg)				Total	Rank
Year	Venue	Weight	1	2	3	Rank	1	2	3	Rank	Total	Rank
Summer Olympics
1996	Atlanta, United States	76 kg				—N/a				—N/a		19
World Championships
1997	Chiang Mai, Thailand	76 kg	115.0	~~120.0~~	~~120.0~~	25	140.0	~~142.5~~	142.5	25	257.5	24
