= Gábor Molnár =

Gábor Molnár may refer to:

- Gábor Molnár (weightlifter)
- Gábor Molnár (footballer)
