= Mehmet Yağcı =

Australian weightlifter

Mehmet Yagci
Personal information
- Born: 15 October 1972 (age 52); Sydney, Australia
- Height: 160 cm (5 ft 3 in)
- Weight: 54.00 kg (119.05 lb)

Sport
- Country: Australia
- Sport: Weightlifting
- Weight class: 54 kg
- Club: State Sports Centre
- Team: National team
- Updated on 4 October 2016

Mehmet Yagci (born 15 October 1972 in Sydney) is an Australian male weightlifter, competing in the 54 kg category and representing Australia at international competitions. He participated at the 2000 Summer Olympics in the 56 kg event. He competed at world championships, most recently at the 1997 World Weightlifting Championships.

== Major results ==
Year	Venue	Weight	Snatch (kg)				Clean & Jerk (kg)				Total	Rank
Year	Venue	Weight	1	2	3	Rank	1	2	3	Rank	Total	Rank
Summer Olympics
2000	Sydney, Australia	56 kg				—				—		17
World Championships
1997	Chiang Mai, Thailand	54 kg	95.0	~~100.0~~	100.0	10	120.0	125.0	~~130.0~~	11	225.0	10
