= Sergey Syrtsov =

Sergey Syrtsov or Sergei Syrtsov may refer to:

- Sergey Syrtsov (weightlifter) (born 1966), former Soviet/Russian weightlifter
- Sergey Syrtsov (politician) (1893-1937), Soviet politician
