= Weightlifting at the 1996 Summer Olympics – Men's 59 kg =

Weightlifting at the Olympics

Men's 59 kg at the Games of the XXVI Olympiad
- Venue: Georgia World Congress Center
- Date: 21 July 1996
- Competitors: 20 from 19 nations
- Winning total: 307.5 kg

Medalists
1st place, gold medalist(s)		Tang Lingsheng	China
2nd place, silver medalist(s)		Leonidas Sabanis	Greece
3rd place, bronze medalist(s)		Nikolaj Pešalov	Bulgaria

These are the results of the men's 59 kg competition in weightlifting at the 1996 Summer Olympics in Atlanta. A total of 20 athletes competed in the event.

== Results ==
Each weightlifter had three attempts for both the snatch and clean and jerk lifting methods. The total of the best successful lift of each method was used to determine the final rankings and medal winners. The weightlifter from China won the gold, with a combined lift of 307.5 kg.

Rank	Athlete	Group	Body weight	Snatch (kg)				Clean & Jerk (kg)				Total
Rank	Athlete	Group	Body weight	1	2	3	Result	1	2	3	Result	Total
1st place, gold medalist(s)	Tang Lingsheng (CHN)	A	58.61	130.0	135.0	137.5	137.5	162.5	167.5	170.0	170.0	307.5
2nd place, silver medalist(s)	Leonidas Sabanis (GRE)	A	58.53	135.0	137.5	~~140.0~~	137.5	162.5	~~167.5~~	167.5	167.5	305.0
3rd place, bronze medalist(s)	Nikolay Peshalov (BUL)	A	58.88	~~132.5~~	132.5	137.5	137.5	~~162.5~~	~~162.5~~	165.0	165.0	302.5
4	Hiroshi Ikehata (JPN)	B	58.66	125.0	130.0	132.5	132.5	157.5	162.5	165.0	165.0	297.5
5	William Vargas (CUB)	A	58.73	~~130.0~~	130.0	135.0	135.0	155.0	160.0	162.5	162.5	297.5
6	Xu Dong (CHN)	A	58.60	132.5	~~137.5~~	~~137.5~~	132.5	162.5	~~170.0~~	~~170.0~~	162.5	295.0
7	Yurik Sarkisian (AUS)	A	58.60	125.0	~~130.0~~	~~130.0~~	125.0	155.0	~~160.0~~	~~160.0~~	155.0	280.0
8	Zoltán Farkas (HUN)	B	58.90	130.0	~~132.5~~	~~132.5~~	130.0	140.0	145.0	150.0	150.0	280.0
9	Bryan Jacob (USA)	B	58.82	117.5	122.5	~~125.0~~	122.5	145.0	150.0	~~152.5~~	150.0	272.5
10	Petr Stanislav (CZE)	B	58.70	105.0	110.0	112.5	112.5	135.0	140.0	142.5	142.5	255.0
11	Raghavan Chanderasekaran (IND)	B	58.89	~~110.0~~	110.0	112.5	112.5	135.0	140.0	~~145.0~~	140.0	252.5
12	Viktor Sinyak (BLR)	B	58.70	112.5	~~120.0~~	~~120.0~~	112.5	132.5	~~137.5~~	137.5	137.5	250.0
13	César Rodríguez (PUR)	B	58.21	105.0	~~110.0~~	110.0	110.0	132.5	~~137.5~~	~~137.5~~	132.5	242.5
14	Nuno Alves (POR)	B	58.28	97.5	100.0	102.5	102.5	130.0	135.0	~~137.5~~	135.0	237.5
15	Bonayan Al-Dosari (KSA)	B	58.89	95.0	~~102.5~~	102.5	102.5	115.0	~~125.0~~	125.0	125.0	227.5
16	Moustafa Buihamghet (MAR)	B	58.62	90.0	~~95.0~~	~~95.0~~	90.0	110.0	115.0	120.0	120.0	210.0
	Chun Byung-kwan (KOR)	A	58.95	130.0	135.0	~~137.5~~	135.0	~~165.0~~	~~167.5~~	~~167.5~~	–	–
	Asif Malikov (AZE)	A	58.74	~~125.0~~	~~125.0~~	~~125.0~~	–	–	–	–	–	–
	Marcus Stephen (NRU)	A	58.88	~~120.0~~	~~120.0~~	~~120.0~~	–	–	–	–	–	–
	Hafiz Suleymanoglu (TUR)	A	58.90	130.0	135.0	~~137.5~~	135.0	~~157.5~~	~~157.5~~	~~160.0~~	–	–

== Sources ==
- "Official Olympic Report". International Olympic Committee. Archived from the original on 12 June 2007.
