= Thomas Ingalsbe =

American weightlifter (born 1969)

Personal information
- Born: November 16, 1969 (age 56) Marietta, Georgia, United States

Sport
- Sport: Weightlifting

Thomas Ingalsbe (born November 16, 1969) is an American former weightlifter. He competed in the men's super heavyweight event at the 1996 Summer Olympics.
