= István Halász (weightlifter) =

Hungarian weightlifter

Personal information
- Nationality: Hungarian
- Born: 27 August 1965 (age 59); Jászkisér, Hungary

Sport
- Sport: Weightlifting

István Halász (born 27 August 1965) is a Hungarian weightlifter. He competed in the men's middle heavyweight event at the 1992 Summer Olympics.
