= Ruslan Savchenko =

Ukrainian weightlifter (born 1971)

Personal information
- Born: 5 June 1971 (age 55)
- Height: 168 cm (5 ft 6 in)
- Weight: 75.80 kg (167.1 lb)

Sport
- Country: Ukraine
- Sport: Weightlifting
- Weight class: 76 kg
- Team: National team
Medal record
Men's Weightlifting
Representing Ukraine
World Championships
Silver medal – second place	1993 Melbourne	76 kg
Bronze medal – third place	1994 Istanbul	76 kg
European Championships
Gold medal – first place	1994 Sokolov	76 kg
Bronze medal – third place	1997 Rijeka	76 kg
- Updated on 5 October 2016

Ruslan Savchenko (Руслан Савченко, born 5 June 1971) is a Ukrainian male weightlifter, competing in the 76 kg category and representing Ukraine at international competitions. He participated at the 2000 Summer Olympics in the 77 kg event. He competed at world championships, most recently at the 1997 World Weightlifting Championships.

He set two middleweight world records in November 1993 at the world championships, in the snatch and total (snatch + clean & jerk). The snatch world record of 170.0 kg has never been broken and after 1997 this weightclass was discontinued.

== Major results ==
(silver) - 1993 World Championships Middleweight class (370.0 kg)
(bronze) - 1994 World Championships Middleweight class (360.0 kg)
(gold) - 1994 European Championships Middleweight class (355.0 kg)
(bronze) - 1997 European Championships Middleweight class (350.0 kg)

Year	Venue	Weight	Snatch (kg)				Clean & Jerk (kg)				Total	Rank
Year	Venue	Weight	1	2	3	Rank	1	2	3	Rank	Total	Rank
Summer Olympics
2000	Sydney, Australia	77 kg				—N/a				—N/a		11
World Championships
1997	Chiang Mai, Thailand	76 kg	~~160.0~~	~~160.0~~	160.0	5	185.0	—	—	12	345.0	5
