= Weightlifting at the 1992 Summer Olympics – Men's 90 kg =

Weightlifting at the Olympics

Men's 90 kg at the Games of the XXV Olympiad
- Venue: Pavelló de l'Espanya Industrial
- Date: 1 August 1992
- Competitors: 23 from 19 nations
- Winning total: 412.5 kg

Medalists
1st place, gold medalist(s)		Kakhi Kakhiashvili	Unified Team
2nd place, silver medalist(s)		Sergey Syrtsov	Unified Team
3rd place, bronze medalist(s)		Sergiusz Wołczaniecki	Poland

The Men's Middle-heavyweight Weightlifting Event (– 90 kg) is the fourth-heaviest men's event at the weightlifting competition, limiting competitors to a maximum of 90.0 kilograms of body mass. The competition took place on 1 August in the Pavelló de l'Espanya Industrial.

Each lifter performed in both the snatch and clean and jerk lifts, with the final score being the sum of the lifter's best result in each. The athlete received three attempts in each of the two lifts; the score for the lift was the heaviest weight successfully lifted. Ties were broken by the lifter with the lightest body weight.

== Results ==
Rank	Name	Body Weight	Snatch (kg)			Clean & Jerk (kg)			Total (kg)
Rank	Name	Body Weight	1	2	3	1	2	3	Total (kg)
1st place, gold medalist(s)	Kakhi Kakhiashvili (EUN)	89.25	170.0	175.0	177.5	220.0	225.0	235.0 =WR	412.5 =OR
2nd place, silver medalist(s)	Serguei Syrtsov (EUN)	89.45	177.5	185.0	190.0 OR	217.5	~~222.5~~	222.5	412.5 =OR
3rd place, bronze medalist(s)	Sergiusz Wołczaniecki (POL)	89.35	172.5	~~177.5~~	~~177.5~~	220.0	~~232.5~~	~~232.5~~	392.5
4	Kim Byung-Chan (KOR)	87.95	170.0	~~175.0~~	~~175.0~~	210.0	~~222.5~~	~~222.5~~	380.0
5	Ivan Chakarov (BUL)	89.25	~~170.0~~	170.0	~~175.0~~	207.5	~~212.5~~	~~212.5~~	377.5
6	Emilio Lara (CUB)	84.70	~~165.0~~	165.0	~~162.5~~	200.0	210.0	~~212.5~~	375.0
7	Peter May (GBR)	89.45	~~155.0~~	155.0	160.0	190.0	~~195.0~~	195.0	355.0
8	Harvey Goodman (AUS)	89.40	152.5	~~157.5~~	157.5	192.5	~~197.5~~	~~197.5~~	350.0
9	Cédric Plançon (FRA)	84.70	152.5	157.5	~~160.0~~	182.5	187.5	~~192.5~~	345.0
10	István Dudás (HUN)	89.90	152.5	~~157.5~~	157.5	180.0	~~187.5~~	187.5	345.0
11	István Halász (HUN)	87.65	~~152.5~~	152.5	~~155.0~~	190.0	~~197.5~~	~~197.5~~	342.5
12	Yun Chol (PRK)	89.25	~~150.0~~	150.0	~~155.0~~	~~190.0~~	190.0	~~200.0~~	340.0
13	Brett Brian (USA)	89.00	145.0	150.0	~~155.0~~	187.5	~~192.5~~	~~192.5~~	337.5
14	Yvan Darsigny (CAN)	86.00	~~145.0~~	145.0	150.0	175.0	185.0	~~190.0~~	335.0
15	Keijo Tahvanainen (FIN)	89.80	142.5	147.5	~~150.0~~	182.5	187.5	~~190.0~~	335.0
16	Mahmoud Mahgoub (EGY)	89.00	140.0	150.0	~~155.0~~	170.0	~~180.0~~	180.0	330.0
17	Janne Kanerva (FIN)	88.55	142.5	147.5	~~150.0~~	~~180.0~~	180.0	~~185.0~~	327.5
18	Keith Boxell (GBR)	89.55	145.0	~~152.5~~	~~152.5~~	170.0	177.5	~~185.0~~	322.5
19	Paul Enuki (PNG)	88.10	~~122.5~~	~~122.5~~	122.5	~~162.5~~	162.5	170.0	292.5
20	Casiano Tejeda (BOL)	89.15	122.5	~~127.5~~	127.5	152.5	157.5	~~160.0~~	285.0
21	Eric Brown (ASA)	89.05	125.0	~~130.0~~	~~132.5~~	157.5	~~165.0~~	~~165.0~~	282.5
-	Hassan El-Kaissi (LIB)	89.30	152.5	-	-	-	-	-	DNF
-	Atallah Abdullah (IRQ)	88.15	~~160.0~~	~~160.0~~	-	-	-	-	DNF
