= 1997 World Weightlifting Championships – Men's 76 kg =

The 1997 World Weightlifting Championships were held in Chiang Mai, Thailand from December 6 to December 14. The men's competition in the 76 kg division was staged on 10 December 1997.

== Medalists ==
Event	Gold		Silver		Bronze	
Snatch	Georgi Gardev (BUL)	167.5 kg	Waldemar Kosiński (POL)	165.0 kg	Yoto Yotov (BUL)	165.0 kg
Clean & Jerk	Yoto Yotov (BUL)	202.5 kg	Andrzej Kozłowski (POL)	200.0 kg	Waldemar Kosiński (POL)	197.5 kg
Total	Yoto Yotov (BUL)	367.5 kg	Georgi Gardev (BUL)	365.0 kg	Waldemar Kosiński (POL)	362.5 kg

== Records ==
Prior to this competition, the existing world records were as follows.

World Record	Snatch	Ruslan Savchenko (UKR)	170.0 kg	Melbourne, Australia	16 November 1993
World Record	Clean & Jerk	Pablo Lara (CUB)	208.0 kg	Szekszárd, Hungary	20 April 1996
World Record	Total	Pablo Lara (CUB)	372.5 kg	Szekszárd, Hungary	20 April 1996

== Results ==
Rank	Athlete	Body weight	Snatch (kg)				Clean & Jerk (kg)				Total
Rank	Athlete	Body weight	1	2	3	Rank	1	2	3	Rank	Total
1st place, gold medalist(s)	Yoto Yotov (BUL)	75.86	157.5	162.5	165.0	3rd place, bronze medalist(s)	195.0	202.5	—	1st place, gold medalist(s)	367.5
2nd place, silver medalist(s)	Georgi Gardev (BUL)	75.60	160.0	165.0	167.5	1st place, gold medalist(s)	190.0	195.0	197.5	4	365.0
3rd place, bronze medalist(s)	Waldemar Kosiński (POL)	75.25	160.0	~~165.0~~	165.0	2nd place, silver medalist(s)	~~192.5~~	192.5	197.5	3rd place, bronze medalist(s)	362.5
4	Andrzej Kozłowski (POL)	75.25	155.0	160.0	162.5	4	195.0	200.0	~~202.5~~	2nd place, silver medalist(s)	362.5
5	Ruslan Savchenko (UKR)	75.80	~~160.0~~	~~160.0~~	160.0	5	185.0	—	—	12	345.0
6	Oleg Perepetchenov (RUS)	75.25	145.0	150.0	155.0	7	180.0	185.0	187.5	6	342.5
7	Andrey Poitschke (GER)	75.55	~~155.0~~	~~155.0~~	155.0	9	177.5	182.5	187.5	7	342.5
8	Hovhannes Barseghyan (ARM)	75.60	155.0	~~160.0~~	~~150.0~~	10	~~185.0~~	185.0	~~190.0~~	9	340.0
9	Lee Kang-suk (KOR)	75.60	147.5	152.5	~~155.0~~	11	185.0	~~190.0~~	~~190.0~~	8	337.5
10	Khachatur Kyapanaktsyan (ARM)	75.50	155.0	~~160.0~~	~~160.0~~	8	180.0	~~187.5~~	~~187.5~~	14	335.0
11	Vladimir Krasnyi (RUS)	75.75	150.0	~~155.0~~	~~155.0~~	13	185.0	~~190.0~~	~~190.0~~	10	335.0
12	Rafat Galal (EGY)	75.75	142.5	147.5	152.5	12	175.0	180.0	~~185.0~~	15	332.5
13	Damian Brown (AUS)	75.75	140.0	145.0	~~150.0~~	15	180.0	185.0	~~190.0~~	11	330.0
14	Tim McRae (USA)	75.95	147.5	~~152.5~~	~~152.5~~	14	~~177.5~~	177.5	182.5	13	330.0
15	Gabriel Lemme (ARG)	75.95	140.0	145.0	~~147.5~~	16	170.0	177.5	~~182.5~~	16	322.5
16	Gennadiy Yermakov (KAZ)	75.55	142.5	~~147.5~~	~~147.5~~	18	175.0	~~180.0~~	~~180.0~~	17	317.5
17	André Aldenhov (SWE)	75.00	140.0	~~145.0~~	~~145.0~~	19	~~172.5~~	172.5	~~177.5~~	18	312.5
18	Viktor Gumán (SVK)	74.75	~~142.5~~	142.5	~~147.5~~	17	165.0	~~170.0~~	~~170.0~~	20	307.5
19	Gatrat Usmanov (KAZ)	75.65	135.0	~~140.0~~	~~140.0~~	20	165.0	~~170.0~~	~~170.0~~	21	300.0
20	Craig Blythman (AUS)	75.70	~~130.0~~	130.0	~~135.0~~	22	150.0	165.0	~~172.5~~	22	295.0
21	Tsai Hung-chang (TPE)	75.50	130.0	~~135.0~~	~~135.0~~	21	160.0	~~165.0~~	~~165.0~~	23	290.0
22	Chalermphol Moonmongkol (THA)	75.75	120.0	~~125.0~~	—	24	160.0	170.0	~~175.0~~	19	290.0
23	Rakkaew Damrong (THA)	73.75	115.0	125.0	~~130.0~~	23	140.0	150.0	~~155.0~~	24	275.0
24	Edward Silva (URU)	74.25	115.0	~~120.0~~	~~120.0~~	25	140.0	~~142.5~~	142.5	25	257.5
—	Pablo Lara (CUB)	75.90	155.0	160.0	~~162.5~~	6	~~200.0~~	~~200.0~~	~~202.5~~	—	—
—	Mehmet Yılmaz (TUR)	75.40	~~160.0~~	~~160.0~~	~~162.5~~	—	~~190.0~~	190.0	~~197.5~~	5	—
