= 2001 World Weightlifting Championships – Women's 75 kg =

The 2001 World Weightlifting Championships were held in Antalya, Turkey from November 4 to November 11. The women's competition in 75 kg division was staged on 9 November 2001.

== Medalists ==
Event	Gold		Silver		Bronze	
Snatch	Gyöngyi Likerecz (HUN)	115.0 kg	Aysel Özgür (TUR)	112.5 kg	Şule Şahbaz (TUR)	112.5 kg
Clean & Jerk	Gyöngyi Likerecz (HUN)	140.0 kg	Cao Chunyan (CHN)	135.0 kg	Kuo Yi-hang (TPE)	135.0 kg
Total	Gyöngyi Likerecz (HUN)	255.0 kg	Şule Şahbaz (TUR)	247.5 kg	Cao Chunyan (CHN)	242.5 kg

== Records ==
Prior to this competition, the existing world records were as follows.

World Record	Snatch	Tang Weifang (CHN)	116.0 kg	Wuhan, China	3 September 1999
World Record	Clean & Jerk	Sun Tianni (CHN)	142.5 kg	Osaka, Japan	6 May 2000
World Record	Total	Sun Tianni (CHN)	257.5 kg	Osaka, Japan	6 May 2000

== Results ==
Rank	Athlete	Body weight	Snatch (kg)				Clean & Jerk (kg)				Total
Rank	Athlete	Body weight	1	2	3	Rank	1	2	3	Rank	Total
1st place, gold medalist(s)	Gyöngyi Likerecz (HUN)	74.74	112.5	116.0	~~117.5~~	1st place, gold medalist(s)	135.5	140.0	—	1st place, gold medalist(s)	255.0
2nd place, silver medalist(s)	Şule Şahbaz (TUR)	74.26	107.5	112.5	~~116.5~~	3rd place, bronze medalist(s)	~~125.0~~	127.5	135.0	4	247.5
3rd place, bronze medalist(s)	Cao Chunyan (CHN)	73.78	~~105.0~~	105.0	107.5	6	132.5	135.0	~~140.0~~	2nd place, silver medalist(s)	242.5
4	Kuo Yi-hang (TPE)	74.02	~~105.0~~	105.0	~~107.5~~	7	135.0	~~137.5~~	~~137.5~~	3rd place, bronze medalist(s)	240.0
5	Tatyana Khromova (KAZ)	74.80	105.0	~~110.0~~	110.0	4	130.0	~~132.5~~	~~132.5~~	5	240.0
6	Aysel Özgür (TUR)	74.12	110.0	112.5	~~115.0~~	2	115.0	125.0	~~130.0~~	8	237.5
7	Sun Yakun (CHN)	73.46	~~100.0~~	100.0	~~105.0~~	9	127.5	~~132.5~~	~~132.5~~	6	227.5
8	Sefi Onubaye (NGR)	73.68	~~100.0~~	100.0	~~105.0~~	10	125.0	~~130.0~~	~~130.0~~	7	225.0
9	Radomíra Ševčíková (CZE)	74.36	100.0	~~105.0~~	~~105.0~~	11	120.0	125.0	~~127.5~~	9	225.0
10	Christina Ioannidi (GRE)	73.62	90.0	95.0	97.5	12	115.0	120.0	122.5	10	220.0
11	Filippia Kochliaridou (GRE)	74.06	90.0	~~95.0~~	95.0	13	115.0	120.0	~~125.0~~	11	215.0
12	Sumati Devi (IND)	74.54	85.0	90.0	92.5	16	112.5	117.5	~~122.5~~	12	210.0
13	Mónica Carrió (ESP)	74.42	95.0	~~97.5~~	~~97.5~~	14	110.0	~~112.5~~	112.5	13	207.5
14	Rachel Clark (GBR)	70.88	77.5	80.0	82.5	17	92.5	97.5	~~100.0~~	14	180.0
15	Esther Velazco (MEX)	69.06	75.0	~~77.5~~	~~77.5~~	18	~~95.0~~	~~95.0~~	95.0	15	170.0
—	Ludmila Arefieva (RUS)	72.62	100.0	~~105.0~~	107.5	5	~~120.0~~	~~122.5~~	~~122.5~~	—	—
—	Ilona Dankó (HUN)	74.14	105.0	~~110.0~~	~~110.0~~	8	~~125.0~~	~~125.0~~	~~125.0~~	—	—
—	Karoliina Lundahl (FIN)	74.84	95.0	100.0	—	15	—	—	—	—	—
