= Paul Enuki =

Papua New Guinean weightlifter

Personal information
- Nationality: Papua New Guinean
- Born: 2 November 1969 (age 55)

Sport
- Sport: Weightlifting

Paul Enuki (born 2 November 1969) is a Papua New Guinean weightlifter. He competed in the men's middle heavyweight event at the 1992 Summer Olympics.
