= 1997 World Weightlifting Championships – Men's 54 kg =

The 1997 World Weightlifting Championships were held in Chiang Mai, Thailand from December 6 to December 14. The men's competition in the 54 kg division was staged on 6 December 1997.

== Medalists ==
Event	Gold		Silver		Bronze	
Snatch	Yang Bin (CHN)	127.5 kg	Lan Shizhang (CHN)	127.5 kg	Wang Shin-yuan (TPE)	115.0 kg
Clean & Jerk	Lan Shizhang (CHN)	160.0 kg	Wang Shin-yuan (TPE)	147.5 kg	Nayden Rusev (BUL)	147.5 kg
Total	Lan Shizhang (CHN)	287.5 kg	Yang Bin (CHN)	272.5 kg	Wang Shin-yuan (TPE)	262.5 kg

== Records ==
Prior to this competition, the existing world records were as follows.

World record	Snatch	Halil Mutlu (TUR)	132.5 kg	Atlanta, United States	20 July 1996
World record	Clean & Jerk	Halil Mutlu (TUR)	160.0 kg	Istanbul, Turkey	18 November 1994
World record	Total	Halil Mutlu (TUR)	290.0 kg	Istanbul, Turkey	18 November 1994

== Results ==
Rank	Athlete	Body weight	Snatch (kg)				Clean & Jerk (kg)				Total
Rank	Athlete	Body weight	1	2	3	Rank	1	2	3	Rank	Total
1st place, gold medalist(s)	Lan Shizhang (CHN)	54.00	120.0	125.0	127.5	2nd place, silver medalist(s)	152.5	160.5	~~165.0~~	1st place, gold medalist(s)	287.5
2nd place, silver medalist(s)	Yang Bin (CHN)	53.55	120.0	125.0	127.5	1st place, gold medalist(s)	140.0	145.0	—	4	272.5
3rd place, bronze medalist(s)	Wang Shin-yuan (TPE)	53.70	~~112.5~~	112.5	115.0	3rd place, bronze medalist(s)	145.0	147.5	~~152.5~~	2nd place, silver medalist(s)	262.5
4	Nayden Rusev (BUL)	53.90	110.0	115.0	~~117.5~~	4	140.0	147.5	~~150.0~~	3rd place, bronze medalist(s)	262.5
5	Toshiyuki Notomi (JPN)	53.70	107.5	~~110.0~~	110.0	5	140.0	~~145.0~~	~~145.0~~	5	250.0
6	Adrian Jigău (ROM)	53.85	105.0	110.0	~~112.5~~	6	130.0	135.0	140.0	6	250.0
7	Ali Hamid (EGY)	53.65	100.0	105.0	107.5	7	130.0	~~135.0~~	135.0	8	242.5
8	Éric Bonnel (FRA)	53.90	100.0	105.0	107.5	8	130.0	135.0	~~137.5~~	9	242.5
9	Yang Chin-yi (TPE)	53.45	~~105.0~~	105.0	~~107.5~~	9	130.0	135.0	~~140.0~~	7	240.0
10	Mehmet Yağcı (AUS)	54.00	95.0	~~100.0~~	100.0	10	120.0	125.0	~~130.0~~	11	225.0
11	Yasuji Kikuzuma (JPN)	53.30	90.0	92.5	95.0	11	~~120.0~~	~~120.0~~	120.0	12	215.0
—	Somsak Sunyanai (THA)	53.90	~~107.5~~	~~107.5~~	~~107.5~~	—	~~130.0~~	~~130.0~~	130.0	10	—

== New records ==
Clean & Jerk	160.5 kg	Lan Shizhang (CHN)	WR
