= Xu Dong (weightlifter) =

Chinese weightlifter

Personal information
- Nationality: Chinese
- Born: 18 January 1979 (age 46)

Sport
- Sport: Weightlifting

Xu Dong (born 18 January 1979) is a Chinese weightlifter. He competed in the men's bantamweight event at the 1996 Summer Olympics.
