= Moustafa Buihamghet =

Moroccan weightlifter

Personal information
- Nationality: Moroccan
- Born: 1 January 1964 (age 61); Morocco

Sport
- Sport: Weightlifting

Moustafa Buihamghet (born 1 January 1964) is a Moroccan weightlifter. He competed in the men's bantamweight event at the 1996 Summer Olympics.
