= Sunil Lal Joshi =

Nepalese weightlifter

Personal information
- Born: 30 May 1964 Kathmandu, Nepal
- Died: 25 June 2017 (aged 53) Kathmandu, Nepal
- Height: 6 ft (183 cm)
- Weight: 116 kg (256 lb)

Sport
- Sport: Weightlifting
- Event: +108 kg

Achievements and titles
- Olympic finals: Atlanta 1996 (17th)

Sunil Lal Joshi (30 May 1964 – 25 June 2017) was a Nepalese weightlifter from Kathmandu. Joshi represented Nepal at the 1996 Summer Olympics in Atlanta, where he competed in the men's super-heavyweight category.

== Athletic career ==
At the 1996 Olympics, Joshi placed seventeenth in this event, as he successfully lifted 120 kg in the snatch, and hoisted 162.5 kg from his third and final attempt in the clean and jerk, for a total of 282.5 kg.

Joshi also won a record 17 medals in the South Asian Games, claiming a total of six silver and eleven bronze medals in the span of eleven years.

== Coach and executive ==
Joshi went on to become the chief coach of weightlifting at the National Sports Council. He joined as a coach on 17 September 1995 and was promoted to senior coach on 5 January 2006. He was also vice-president of the Nepal Weightlifting Association and chairman of the Olympic Association.

== Death ==
After complaining of respiratory problems on 22 June 2017, he was taken to the Shahid Gangalal National Heart Centre in Kathmandu. Joshi died three days later of a heart attack. He was 53. He is survived by his wife and son.
