= Timour Taimazov =

Ukrainian weightlifter

Personal information
- Born: 8 September 1970 (age 56)
Medal record
Men's Weightlifting
Representing Ukraine
Olympic Games
Gold medal – first place	1996 Atlanta	– 108 kg
World Championships
Gold medal – first place	1993 Melbourne	– 108 kg
Gold medal – first place	1994 Istanbul	– 108 kg
European Championships
Gold medal – first place	1993 Sofia	– 108 kg
Gold medal – first place	1994 Sokolov	– 108 kg
Representing the Unified Team
Olympic Games
Silver medal – second place	1992 Barcelona	– 100 kg
European Championships
Gold medal – first place	1992 Szekszard	– 100 kg

Timour Taimazov (Russian/Ukrainian: Тимур Таймазов,Iron Ossetic: Таймазты Барисы фырт Тимур, born 8 September, 1970) is a former Ossetian-Ukrainian weightlifter, Olympic champion and two-time World Champion.

He was born in Nogir, North Ossetia. Taimazov has a younger brother, Artur, who was also a 2004 Olympic Champion, in the sport- freestyle wrestling 120 kg weight category, but had gold medals for 2008 and 2012 withdrawn for doping offences.

== Career ==
=== Olympics ===
He won a silver medal at the 1992 Summer Olympics in Barcelona.

He participated in the 1996 Summer Olympics after taking a year-long break in 1995. After the snatch portion of the competition, he was in the third place, behind Nicu Vlad (by 2.5 kg) and Sergey Srystov (by bodyweight). In the clean & jerk portion of the competition, Taymasov was the last lifter to attempt a lift, with his first lift of 227.5 kg being successful, after which, he moved into the lead. Srystov and Vlad were unable to make their next lifts and Taymasov had won. After clinching the gold medal, he attempted and successfully made a new Olympic Record clean & jerk of 235.0 kg, bringing his total to 430.0 kg.

== Major results ==
Year	Venue	Weight	Snatch (kg)				Clean & Jerk (kg)				Total	Rank
Year	Venue	Weight	1	2	3	Rank	1	2	3	Rank	Total	Rank
Olympic Games
1992	Barcelona, Spain	100 kg	180.0	185.0	~~190.0~~	3	217.5	~~227.5~~	~~227.5~~	3	402.5	2nd place, silver medalist(s)
1996	Atlanta, United States	108 kg	190.0	195.0	~~197.5~~	3	227.5	235.0	~~240.0~~	1	430.0	1st place, gold medalist(s)
