= Dudaş =

Dudaş may refer to:

- Dudaş, Beypazarı, Ankara Province, Turkey
- Dudaş, Söğüt, Bilecik Province, Turkey

== See also ==
- Dudas (disambiguation)
