= Kim Myong-nam =

North Korean weightlifter (born 1969)

Kim Myong-Nam
Personal information
- Born: 8 February 1969 (age 57)
- Weight: 69.70 kg (153.7 lb)

Sport
- Country: North Korea
- Sport: Weightlifting
- Weight class: 70 kg
- Team: National team
Medal record
Men's weightlifting
Representing North Korea
Olympic Games
Bronze medal – third place	1992 Barcelona	75 Kg
Silver medal – second place	1996 Atlanta	70 Kg
- Updated on 4 October 2016

Korean name
- Hangul: 김명남
- RR: Gim Myeongnam
- MR: Kim Myŏngnam

Kim Myong-Nam (Korean: 김명남; born 8 February 1969) is a North Korean male weightlifter, competing in the 70 kg category and representing North Korea at international competitions. He won the bronze medal at the 1992 Summer Olympics in the 75 kg event and the silver medal at the 1996 Summer Olympics in the 70 kg event. He competed at world championships, most recently at the 1997 World Weightlifting Championships.

Kim set three world records – one in the snatch, one in the clean & jerk, and one in the total.

== Major results ==
(bronze) - 1989 World Championships Lightweight class (327.5 kg)
(gold) - 1990 World Championships Lightweight class (342.5 kg)
(bronze) - 1991 World Championships Lightweight class (340.0 kg)
(bronze) - 1993 World Championships Middleweight class (362.5 kg)
(gold) - 1990 Asian Games Middleweight class

Year	Venue	Weight	Snatch (kg)				Clean & Jerk (kg)				Total	Rank
Year	Venue	Weight	1	2	3	Rank	1	2	3	Rank	Total	Rank
Summer Olympics
1996	Atlanta, United States	70 kg				—N/a				—N/a		2nd place, silver medalist(s)
1992	Barcelona, Spain	75 kg				—N/a				—N/a		3rd place, bronze medalist(s)
World Championships
1997	Chiang Mai, Thailand	70 kg	155.0	~~157.5~~	~~157.5~~	—	~~185.0~~	~~185.0~~	—	—	—	DQ
