= Nayden Rusev =

Bulgarian-Cypriot weightlifter (born 1974)

Personal information
- Born: 22 August 1974 (age 51)
- Weight: 53.90 kg (118.8 lb)

Sport
- Country: BulgariaCyprus
- Sport: Weightlifting
- Weight class: 54 kg
- Team: National team
- Updated on 4 October 2016

Nayden Rusev (Bulgarian: Найден Русев) (born 22 August 1974) is a Bulgarian-Cypriot male former weightlifter, who competed in the 54 kg category and represented Bulgaria at international competitions. He competed at world championships, most recently at the 1997 World Weightlifting Championships, and later for Cyprus in the 2006 Commonwealth Games.

== Major results ==
Year	Venue	Weight	Snatch (kg)				Clean & Jerk (kg)				Total	Rank
Year	Venue	Weight	1	2	3	Rank	1	2	3	Rank	Total	Rank
World Championships
1997	Chiang Mai, Thailand	54 kg	110.0	115.0	~~117.5~~	4	140.0	147.5	~~150.0~~	3rd place, bronze medalist(s)	262.5	4
