= Casiano Tejeda =

Bolivian weightlifter (born 1971)

Personal information
- Nationality: Bolivian
- Born: 13 October 1971 (age 53)

Sport
- Sport: Weightlifting

Casiano Tejeda (born 13 October 1971) is a Bolivian weightlifter. He competed in the men's middle heavyweight event at the 1992 Summer Olympics.
