= 1994 European Weightlifting Championships =

International weightlifting competition

1994 European Championships

The 1994 European Weightlifting Championships were held in Sokolov, Czech Republic from May 9 to May 15, 1994. It was the 73rd edition of the men's event. There were a total number of 162 athletes competing, from 29 nations. The women competition were held in Rome, Italy. It was the 7th event for the women.

== Medal overview ==
=== Men ===
Event		Gold		Silver		Bronze	
– 54 kg	Snatch	(Bulgaria) Sevdalin Minchev	125 kg	(Turkey) Halil Mutlu	122.5 kg	(Greece) Iakovos Polanidis	115 kg
– 54 kg	Clean & Jerk	(Turkey) Halil Mutlu	155 kg	(Bulgaria) Sevdalin Minchev	150 kg	(Greece) Iakovos Polanidis	145 kg
– 54 kg	Total	(Turkey) Halil Mutlu	277.5 kg	(Bulgaria) Sevdalin Minchev	275 kg	(Greece) Iakovos Polanidis	260 kg
– 59 kg	Snatch	(Bulgaria) Nikolay Peshalov	135 kg	(Bulgaria) Radostin Panayotov	132.5 kg	(Russia) Vladimir Melikhov	127.5 kg
– 59 kg	Clean & Jerk	(Bulgaria) Nikolay Peshalov	162.5 kg	(Greece) Georgios Tzelilis	162.5 kg	(Russia) Vladimir Melikhov	157.5 kg
– 59 kg	Total	(Bulgaria) Nikolay Peshalov	297.5 kg	(Bulgaria) Radostin Panayotov	290 kg	(Greece) Georgios Tzelilis	287.5 kg
– 64 kg	Snatch	(Turkey) Naim Suleymanoglu	145 kg	(Turkey) Hafız Süleymanoğlu	142.5 kg	(Bulgaria) Ilian Tsankov	142.5 kg
– 64 kg	Clean & Jerk	(Turkey) Naim Suleymanoglu	180 kg	(Greece) Valerios Leonidis	177.5 kg	(Armenia) Eduard Darbinyan	172.5 kg
– 64 kg	Total	(Turkey) Naim Suleymanoglu	325 kg	(Greece) Valerios Leonidis	317.5 kg	(Bulgaria) Ilian Tsankov	312.5 kg
– 70 kg	Snatch	(Armenia) Israel Militosyan	157.5 kg	(Turkey) Fedail Guler	155 kg	(Turkey) Ergun Batmaz	152.5 kg
– 70 kg	Clean & Jerk	(Bulgaria) Yoto Yotov	192.5 kg	(Turkey) Fedail Guler	187.5 kg	(Armenia) Hayk Yeghiazaryan	185 kg
– 70 kg	Total	(Bulgaria) Yoto Yotov	345 kg	(Turkey) Fedail Guler	342.5 kg	(Turkey) Ergun Batmaz	332.5 kg
– 76 kg	Snatch	(Armenia) Khachatur Kyapanaktsyan	165 kg	(Ukraine) Roman Sevasteev	162.5 kg	(Ukraine) Ruslan Savchenko	160 kg
– 76 kg	Clean & Jerk	(Ukraine) Ruslan Savchenko	195 kg	(Greece) Victor Mitrou	192.5 kg	(Ukraine) Roman Sevasteev	192.5 kg
– 76 kg	Total	(Ukraine) Ruslan Savchenko	355 kg	(Armenia) Khachatur Kyapanaktsyan	355 kg	(Ukraine) Roman Sevasteev	355 kg
– 83 kg	Snatch	(Ukraine) Vadym Bazhan	172.5 kg	(Ukraine) Oleksandr Blyshchyk	170 kg	(Armenia) Sergo Chakhoyan	165 kg
– 83 kg	Clean & Jerk	(Moldova) Vadim Vacarciuc	205 kg	(Ukraine) Vadym Bazhan	205 kg	(Armenia) Sergo Chakhoyan	202.5 kg
– 83 kg	Total	(Ukraine) Vadym Bazhan	377.5 kg	(Ukraine) Oleksandr Blyshchyk	372.5 kg	(Moldova) Vadim Vacarciuc	370 kg
– 91 kg	Snatch	(Russia) Igor Alekseyev	185 kg	(Russia) Alexey Petrov	185 kg	(Georgia (country)) Kakhi Kakhiashvili	180 kg
– 91 kg	Clean & Jerk	(Russia) Alexey Petrov	227.5 kg	(Georgia (country)) Kakhi Kakhiashvili	220 kg	(Bulgaria) Ivan Chakarov	215 kg
– 91 kg	Total	(Russia) Alexey Petrov	412.5 kg	(Georgia (country)) Kakhi Kakhiashvili	400 kg	(Bulgaria) Ivan Chakarov	395 kg
– 99 kg	Snatch	(Russia) Sergey Syrtsov	190 kg	(Armenia) Aghvan Grigoryan	177.5 kg	(Georgia (country)) Mukhran Gogia	177.5 kg
– 99 kg	Clean & Jerk	(Russia) Sergey Syrtsov	225 kg	(Belarus) Oleg Chiritso	217.5 kg	(Georgia (country)) Mukhran Gogia	210 kg
– 99 kg	Total	(Russia) Sergey Syrtsov	415 kg	(Belarus) Oleg Chiritso	387.5 kg	(Georgia (country)) Mukhran Gogia	387.5 kg
– 108 kg	Snatch	(Ukraine) Timur Taymazov	195 kg	(Russia) Vadim Stasenko	182.5 kg	(Ukraine) Ihor Razoronov	182.5 kg
– 108 kg	Clean & Jerk	(Ukraine) Timur Taymazov	235 kg	(Russia) Vadim Stasenko	230 kg	(Russia) Aleksandr Popov	220 kg
– 108 kg	Total	(Ukraine) Timur Taymazov	430 kg	(Russia) Vadim Stasenko	412.5 kg	(Ukraine) Ihor Razoronov	402.5 kg
+ 108 kg	Snatch	(Russia) Andrei Chemerkin	200 kg	(Russia) Artur Skripkin	195 kg	(Ukraine) Serhiy Nahirnyi	182.5 kg
+ 108 kg	Clean & Jerk	(Russia) Andrei Chemerkin	250 kg	(Ukraine) Serhiy Nahirnyi	230 kg	(Belarus) Alexei Krusevich	230 kg
+ 108 kg	Total	(Russia) Andrei Chemerkin	450 kg	(Ukraine) Serhiy Nahirnyi	412.5 kg	(Russia) Artur Skripkin	410 kg

== Medals tables ==
Ranking by "Big" (Total result) medals

Place	Nation	1st place, gold medalist(s)	2nd place, silver medalist(s)	3rd place, bronze medalist(s)	Total
1	Ukraine	3	2	2	7
2	Russia	3	1	1	5
3	Bulgaria	2	2	2	6
4	Turkey	2	1	1	4
5	Greece	0	1	2	3
6	Georgia	0	1	1	2
7	Armenia	0	1	0	1
7	Belarus	0	1	0	1
9	Moldova	0	0	1	1
Total		10	10	10	30
