= Weightlifting at the 1996 Summer Olympics – Men's +108 kg =

Weightlifting at the Olympics

Men's +108 kg at the Games of the XXVI Olympiad
- Venue: Georgia World Congress Center
- Date: 30 July 1996
- Competitors: 19 from 15 nations
- Winning total: 457.5 kg

Medalists
1st place, gold medalist(s)		Andrey Chemerkin	Russia
2nd place, silver medalist(s)		Ronny Weller	Germany
3rd place, bronze medalist(s)		Stefan Botev Khristov	Australia

These are the results of the men's +108 kg competition in weightlifting at the 1996 Summer Olympics in Atlanta. A total number of 19 athletes competed in this event. The weightlifter from Russia won the gold, with a combined lift of 457.5 kg.

== Results ==
Each weightlifter had three attempts for both the snatch and clean and jerk lifting methods. The total of the best successful lift of each method was used to determine the final rankings and medal winners.

Rank	Athlete	Group	Body weight	Snatch (kg)				Clean & Jerk (kg)				Total
Rank	Athlete	Group	Body weight	1	2	3	Result	1	2	3	Result	Total
1st place, gold medalist(s)	Andrei Chemerkin (RUS)	A	165.47	190.0	197.5	~~202.5~~	197.5	240.0	250.0	260.0	260.0	457.5
2nd place, silver medalist(s)	Ronny Weller (GER)	A	138.09	195.0	200.0	~~202.5~~	200.0	245.0	252.5	255.0	255.0	455.0
3rd place, bronze medalist(s)	Stefan Botev (AUS)	A	123.96	195.0	200.0	~~202.5~~	200.0	240.0	250.0	~~255.0~~	250.0	450.0
4	Kim Tae-hyun (KOR)	A	133.30	~~190.0~~	190.0	~~195.0~~	190.0	240.0	247.5	~~257.5~~	247.5	437.5
5	Aleksandr Kurlovich (BLR)	A	133.74	~~195.0~~	~~195.0~~	195.0	195.0	230.0	~~247.5~~	–	230.0	425.0
6	Manfred Nerlinger (GER)	A	164.42	180.0	~~185.0~~	185.0	185.0	237.5	~~242.5~~	~~245.0~~	237.5	422.5
7	Pavlos Saltsidis (GRE)	A	132.79	~~180.0~~	180.0	185.0	185.0	~~230.0~~	230.0	235.0	235.0	420.0
8	Tibor Stark (HUN)	A	128.78	180.0	185.0	187.5	187.5	220.0	227.5	~~230.0~~	227.5	415.0
9	Raimonds Bergmanis (LAT)	B	131.85	172.5	~~177.5~~	177.5	177.5	217.5	~~225.0~~	225.0	225.0	402.5
10	Stian Grimseth (NOR)	A	141.96	~~180.0~~	180.0	~~187.5~~	180.0	220.0	~~225.0~~	~~225.0~~	220.0	400.0
11	Erdinç Aslan (TUR)	B	138.08	165.0	170.0	~~175.0~~	170.0	210.0	220.0	227.5	227.5	397.5
12	Anders Bergström (SWE)	B	131.21	170.0	~~175.0~~	175.0	175.0	212.5	220.0	~~225.0~~	220.0	395.0
13	Ashot Danielyan (ARM)	B	148.53	170.0	177.5	~~180.0~~	177.5	210.0	~~215.0~~	217.5	217.5	395.0
14	Mark Henry (USA)	A	184.92	175.0	~~182.5~~	~~185.0~~	175.0	202.5	–	–	202.5	377.5
15	Steve Kettner (AUS)	B	136.38	160.0	165.0	170.0	170.0	190.0	200.0	205.0	205.0	375.0
16	Thomas Ingalsbe (USA)	B	151.22	160.0	165.0	~~170.0~~	165.0	~~200.0~~	200.0	–	200.0	365.0
17	Sunil Lal Joshi (NEP)	B	115.61	112.5	120.0	~~125.0~~	120.0	~~150.0~~	160.0	162.5	162.5	282.5
	Igor Khalilov (UZB)	A	131.73	177.5	~~182.5~~	–	177.5	–	–	–	–	–
	Leonid Taranenko (BLR)	A	150.55	–	–	–	–	–	–	–	–	–

== See also ==
- 1998 World Weightlifting Championships - Men's +105 kg

== Sources ==
- "Official Olympic Report". International Olympic Committee. Archived from the original on 12 June 2007.
