= Kakhi Kakhiashvili =

Georgian-Greek weightlifter (born 1969)

Akakios Kakiasvilis
Personal information
- Nationality: Georgian / Greek
- Born: Kakhi Kakhiashvili; 13 July 1969 (age 57) Tskhinvali, Georgian SSR, Soviet Union
- Height: 1.78 m (5 ft 10 in)

Sport
- Sport: Weightlifting
Medal record
Men's weightlifting
Representing Georgia
World Championships
Silver medal – second place	1993 Melbourne	–91 kg
European Championships
Gold medal – first place	1993 Sofia	–91 kg
Silver medal – second place	1994 Sokolov	–91 kg
Representing the Unified Team
Olympic Games
Gold medal – first place	1992 Barcelona	–90 kg
European Championships
Gold medal – first place	1992 Szekszard	–90 kg
Representing Greece
Olympic Games
Gold medal – first place	1996 Atlanta	–99 kg
Gold medal – first place	2000 Sydney	–94 kg
World Championships
Silver medal – second place	1994 Istanbul	–91 kg
Gold medal – first place	1995 Guangzhou	–99 kg
Gold medal – first place	1998 Lahti	–94 kg
Gold medal – first place	1999 Athens	–94 kg
European Championships
Gold medal – first place	1995 Warsaw	–91 kg
Gold medal – first place	1996 Stavanger	–99 kg
Bronze medal – third place	1998 Riesa	–94 kg
Silver medal – second place	1999 Lacoruna	–94 kg

Kakhi Kakhiashvili (Georgian: კახი კახიაშვილი, Greek: Ακάκιος "Κάχι" Κακιασβίλης; born 13 July 1969 in Tskhinvali, Georgian SSR, USSR) is a Georgian-Greek weightlifter, one of only six weightlifters to have won three consecutive gold medals at Olympic Games. He won his first at Barcelona 1992, competing with the Unified Team, and later as a citizen of Greece at Atlanta 1996 and in Sydney 2000. He won three Senior World Championships (1995, 1998, 1999), was twice a silver medalist at the Senior World Championships (1993 and 1994), and set seven world records during his career. He was named the 1996 and 1999 Greek Male Athlete of the Year.

Kakhiashvili was born in Tskhinvali, Georgia, to a Georgian father and a Greek mother, Maria Lamprianidi. He is renowned in weightlifting circles for his uncanny ability to lift exactly what was required to win. Dubbed as a "computer" by some competitors, he also had the ability to block out everything that was not relevant to the competition at hand.

== Career ==
At the 1992 Summer Olympics lifting for the Unified Team in the 90 kg category, he went against the instructions of his coach Vasily Alexeev, the all-time weightlifting great. His coach wanted his Russian teammate Sergey Syrtsov to win the contest and did not let Kakhiashvili try to lift heavier to beat the Russian. During the snatch portion of the competition, it looked like Sergey Syrtsov was going to win, with a 12.5 kg lead over Kakhiashvili from an Olympic Record 190.0 kg snatch. During the clean & jerk portion of the competition Kakhiashvili lifted 225.0 kg on his second attempt, giving him a total of 402.5 kg, a full 10.0 kg less than Syrstov. Kakhi ordered 10 kg more to be put on the bar in order to beat his Russian teammate. He successfully lifted the 235.0 kg clean and jerk, giving him a total of 412.5 kg. Event though his total tied Syrstov, Kakhiashvili won the gold medal due to virtue of a lighter bodyweight, (89.25 kg vs. 89.45 kg) this performance established his right to the title of one of the sports elite lifters.

== Major results ==
Year	Venue	Weight	Snatch (kg)				Clean & Jerk (kg)				Total	Rank
Year	Venue	Weight	1	2	3	Rank	1	2	3	Rank	Total	Rank
Olympic Games
1992	Barcelona, Spain	–90 kg	170.0	175.0	177.5	2	220.0	225.0	235.0 =WR	1	412.5 =OR	1st place, gold medalist(s)
1996	Atlanta, United States	–99 kg	180.0	185.0	~~187.5~~	3	220.0	225.0	235.0 WR	1	420.0 WR	1st place, gold medalist(s)
2000	Sydney, Australia	–94 kg	180.0	185.0	~~187.5~~	2	220.0	—	—	3	405.0	1st place, gold medalist(s)
2004	Athens, Greece	–94 kg	~~180.0~~	180.0	~~185.0~~	4	~~220.0~~	~~220.0~~	~~220.0~~	—	—	—
World Championships
1993	Melbourne, Australia	–91 kg	175.0	~~180.0~~	180.0	3rd place, bronze medalist(s)	200.0	215.0	225.0	1st place, gold medalist(s)	402.5	2nd place, silver medalist(s)
1994	Istanbul, Turkey	–91 kg	172.5	177.5	~~180.0~~	3rd place, bronze medalist(s)	210.0	220.0	~~230.0~~	2nd place, silver medalist(s)	397.5	2nd place, silver medalist(s)
1995	Guangzhou, China	–99 kg	~~182.5~~	182.5	~~187.5~~	3rd place, bronze medalist(s)	225.0	227.5	~~230.0~~	1st place, gold medalist(s)	410.0	1st place, gold medalist(s)
1998	Lahti, Finland	–94 kg	175.0	180.0	~~182.5~~	3rd place, bronze medalist(s)	215.0	220.0	—	1st place, gold medalist(s)	400.0	1st place, gold medalist(s)
1999	Athens, Greece	–94 kg	180.0	185.0	188.0 WR	1st place, gold medalist(s)	222.5	225.0	~~230.5~~	1st place, gold medalist(s)	412.5 WR^{[a]}	1st place, gold medalist(s)
European Championships
1992	Szekszárd, Hungary	–90 kg	175.0			3rd place, bronze medalist(s)	225.0			1st place, gold medalist(s)	400.0	1st place, gold medalist(s)
1993	Sofia, Bulgaria	–91 kg	180.0			1st place, gold medalist(s)	222.5			1st place, gold medalist(s)	402.5	1st place, gold medalist(s)
1994	Sokolov, Czech Republic	–91 kg	180.0			3rd place, bronze medalist(s)	200.0			2nd place, silver medalist(s)	400.0	2nd place, silver medalist(s)
1995	Warsaw, Poland	–91 kg	180.0			1st place, gold medalist(s)	228.5 WR			1st place, gold medalist(s)	407.5	1st place, gold medalist(s)
1996	Stavanger, Norway	–99 kg	165.0	170.0	~~175.0~~	3rd place, bronze medalist(s)	210.0	222.5	—	1st place, gold medalist(s)	392.5	1st place, gold medalist(s)
1998	Riesa, Germany	–94 kg	165.0	170.0	172.5	4	207.5	~~210.0~~	~~212.5~~	3rd place, bronze medalist(s)	380.0	3rd place, bronze medalist(s)
1999	A Coruña, Spain	–94 kg	172.5	177.5	~~180.0~~	3rd place, bronze medalist(s)	217.5	222.5	225.0	1st place, gold medalist(s)	402.5	2nd place, silver medalist(s)
2003	Loutraki, Greece	–94 kg	167.5	~~175.0~~	177.5	5	—	—	—	—	—	—
2004	Kyiv, Ukraine	–94 kg	172.5	~~177.5~~	177.5	6	~~215.0~~	215.0	~~220.0~~	4	392.5	4
Junior World Championships
1988	Athens, Greece	–82.5 kg	170.0			1st place, gold medalist(s)	NA			NA	NA	NA
1989	Fort Lauderdale, United States	–90 kg	170.0			2nd place, silver medalist(s)	225.0 JWR			1st place, gold medalist(s)	395.0	1st place, gold medalist(s)

== Notes ==
- ^{a} Not a world record at the time of the competition, became a world record when IWF decided to eliminate the world standards from the list of World Records on 24 June 2008.
