= César Rodríguez (weightlifter) =

Puerto Rican weightlifter

Personal information
- Nationality: Puerto Rican
- Born: 28 August 1973 (age 52)

Sport
- Sport: Weightlifting

César Rodríguez (born 28 August 1973) is a Puerto Rican weightlifter. He competed in the men's bantamweight event at the 1996 Summer Olympics.
