= Zoltán Kovács (weightlifter) =

Hungarian weightlifter

Personal information
- Nationality: Hungarian
- Born: 24 August 1977 (age 47); Budapest, Hungary

Sport
- Sport: Weightlifting

Zoltán Kovács (born 24 August 1977) is a Hungarian weightlifter. He competed at the 2000 Summer Olympics and the 2004 Summer Olympics.
