= Tadeusz Drzazga =

Polish weightlifter (born 1975)

Medal record

Men's Weightlifting

Representing Poland

World Championships
Silver medal – second place	1997 Chiangmai	– 91 kg

European Championships
Bronze medal – third place	2003 Loutraki	– 94 kg

Tadeusz Drzazga (August 7, 1975) is a retired male weightlifter from Poland. He competed for his native country at the 2004 Summer Olympics in Athens, Greece, finishing in 13th place in the men's middle-heavyweight division (– 94 kg). Drzazga is best known for winning the silver medal at the 1997 World Weightlifting Championships in the men's heavyweight class (– 91 kg).
