= Jaroslav Jokeľ =

Slovak weightlifter

Personal information
- Nationality: Slovak
- Born: 2 April 1970 (age 56) Košice, Czechoslovakia

Sport
- Sport: Weightlifting

Jaroslav Jokeľ (born 2 April 1970) is a Slovak weightlifter. He competed at the 1992 Summer Olympics and the 1996 Summer Olympics.
