= István Dudás (weightlifter) =

Hungarian weightlifter

Personal information
- Nationality: Hungarian
- Born: 12 August 1971 (age 53); Tatabánya, Hungary

Sport
- Sport: Weightlifting

István Dudás (born 12 August 1971) is a Hungarian weightlifter. He competed in the men's middle heavyweight event at the 1992 Summer Olympics.
