= Maksim Agapitov =

Russian weightlifter (born 1970)

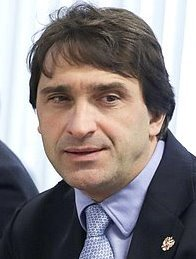

Personal information
- Full name: Maxim Agapitov
- Born: 13 May 1970 (age 56) Tryokhgorny, Russia
- Education: Moscow Academy of Physical Culture (2000); Moscow Power Engineering Institute (1993)

Sport
- Sport: Weightlifting
- Team: National team
- Retired: 2000
Medal record
Representing Russia
World Championships
Gold medal – first place	1997 Chiang Mai	-91 kg

Maxim Oktyabrinovich Agapitov (Russian: Максим Октябринович Агапитов; born 13 May 1970) is a retired Russian weightlifter. He competed internationally between 1992 and 2000 and held the national title in 1993 and 1997 and the world title in 1997. After that he worked as a national coach (2003–2008) and weightlifting official. He took up weightlifting aged 10, following his father, who was a weightlifting coach.

Agapitov is an executive member of the International Weightlifting Federation, vice-president of the European Weightlifting Federation and president of the Russian Weightlifting Federation.

In March 2022, Agapitov posted a clip from a Moscow rally at which Vladimir Putin lauded the 2022 Russian invasion of Ukraine.
