= Weightlifting at the 1996 Summer Olympics =

Weightlifting at the Games of the XXVI Olympiad
- Venue: Georgia World Congress Center
- Dates: 20–30 July 1996
- Competitors: 243 from 77 nations

The weightlifting competition at the 1996 Summer Olympics in Atlanta consisted of ten weight classes.

== Medal summary ==
| Games | Gold | Silver | Bronze |
|---|---|---|---|
| 54 kg | Halil Mutlu; Turkey | Zhang Xiangsen; China | Sevdalin Minchev; Bulgaria |
| 59 kg | Tang Lingsheng; China | Leonidas Sampanis; Greece | Nikolay Peshalov; Bulgaria |
| 64 kg | Naim Süleymanoğlu; Turkey | Valerios Leonidis; Greece | Xiao Jiangang; China |
| 70 kg | Zhan Xugang; China | Kim Myong-nam; North Korea | Attila Feri; Hungary |
| 76 kg | Pablo Lara Rodriguez; Cuba | Yoto Yotov; Bulgaria | Jon Chol-ho; North Korea |
| 83 kg | Pyrros Dimas; Greece | Marc Huster; Germany | Andrzej Cofalik; Poland |
| 91 kg | Aleksei Petrov; Russia | Leonidas Kokas; Greece | Oliver Caruso; Germany |
| 99 kg | Kakhi Kakhiashvili; Greece | Anatoli Khrapaty; Kazakhstan | Denys Gotfrid; Ukraine |
| 108 kg | Timour Taimazov; Ukraine | Serguei Syrtsov; Russia | Nicu Vlad; Romania |
| +108 kg | Andrei Chemerkin; Russia | Ronny Weller; Germany | Stefan Botev; Australia |

== Medal table ==
| Rank | Nation | Gold | Silver | Bronze | Total |
|---|---|---|---|---|---|
| 1 | Greece | 2 | 3 | 0 | 5 |
| 2 | China | 2 | 1 | 1 | 4 |
| 3 | Russia | 2 | 1 | 0 | 3 |
| 4 | Turkey | 2 | 0 | 0 | 2 |
| 5 | Ukraine | 1 | 0 | 1 | 2 |
| 6 | Cuba | 1 | 0 | 0 | 1 |
| 7 | Germany | 0 | 2 | 1 | 3 |
| 8 | Bulgaria | 0 | 1 | 2 | 3 |
| 9 | North Korea | 0 | 1 | 1 | 2 |
| 10 | Kazakhstan | 0 | 1 | 0 | 1 |
| 11 | Australia | 0 | 0 | 1 | 1 |
| 11 | Hungary | 0 | 0 | 1 | 1 |
| 11 | Poland | 0 | 0 | 1 | 1 |
| 11 | Romania | 0 | 0 | 1 | 1 |
| Totals (14 entries) | | 10 | 10 | 10 | 30 |

== Participating nations ==
A total of 236 weightlifters from 77 nations competed at the Atlanta Games:

- Albania (1)
- Algeria (3)
- American Samoa (1)
- Argentina (3)
- Armenia (10)
- Aruba (1)
- Australia (7)
- Azerbaijan (2)
- Belarus (10)
- Brazil (1)
- Bulgaria (10)
- Cameroon (1)
- Canada (2)
- Chile (1)
- China (10)
- Chinese Taipei (4)
- Colombia (5)
- Cook Islands (1)
- Cuba (5)
- Czech Republic (2)
- Dominican Republic (1)
- Egypt (1)
- El Salvador (1)
- Fiji (1)
- Finland (2)
- France (2)
- Georgia (2)
- Germany (10)
- Great Britain (1)
- Greece (10)
- Guatemala (1)
- Hungary (7)
- India (5)
- Indonesia (1)
- Iraq (1)
- Israel (1)
- Italy (2)
- Japan (7)
- Kazakhstan (7)
- Kenya (1)
- North Korea (2)
- South Korea (7)
- Kuwait (1)
- Latvia (5)
- Lithuania (1)
- Mauritius (2)
- Moldova (5)
- Morocco (1)
- Nauru (3)
- Nepal (1)
- Nigeria (1)
- Norway (1)
- Panama (1)
- Papua New Guinea (1)
- Poland (5)
- Portugal (1)
- Puerto Rico (1)
- Romania (5)
- Russia (9)
- Samoa (1)
- Saudi Arabia (1)
- Seychelles (1)
- Slovakia (3)
- Solomon Islands (1)
- Spain (1)
- Sweden (2)
- Syria (1)
- Thailand (1)
- Tonga (1)
- Turkey (10)
- Uganda (1)
- Ukraine (7)
- United States (10)
- Uruguay (1)
- Uzbekistan (5)
- Venezuela (1)
- FR Yugoslavia (1)

== Sources ==
- "Olympic Medal Winners". International Olympic Committee.
- "Official Olympic Report". International Olympic Committee. Archived from the original on 12 June 2007.
