= Gordan Dudas =

German politician (born 1971)

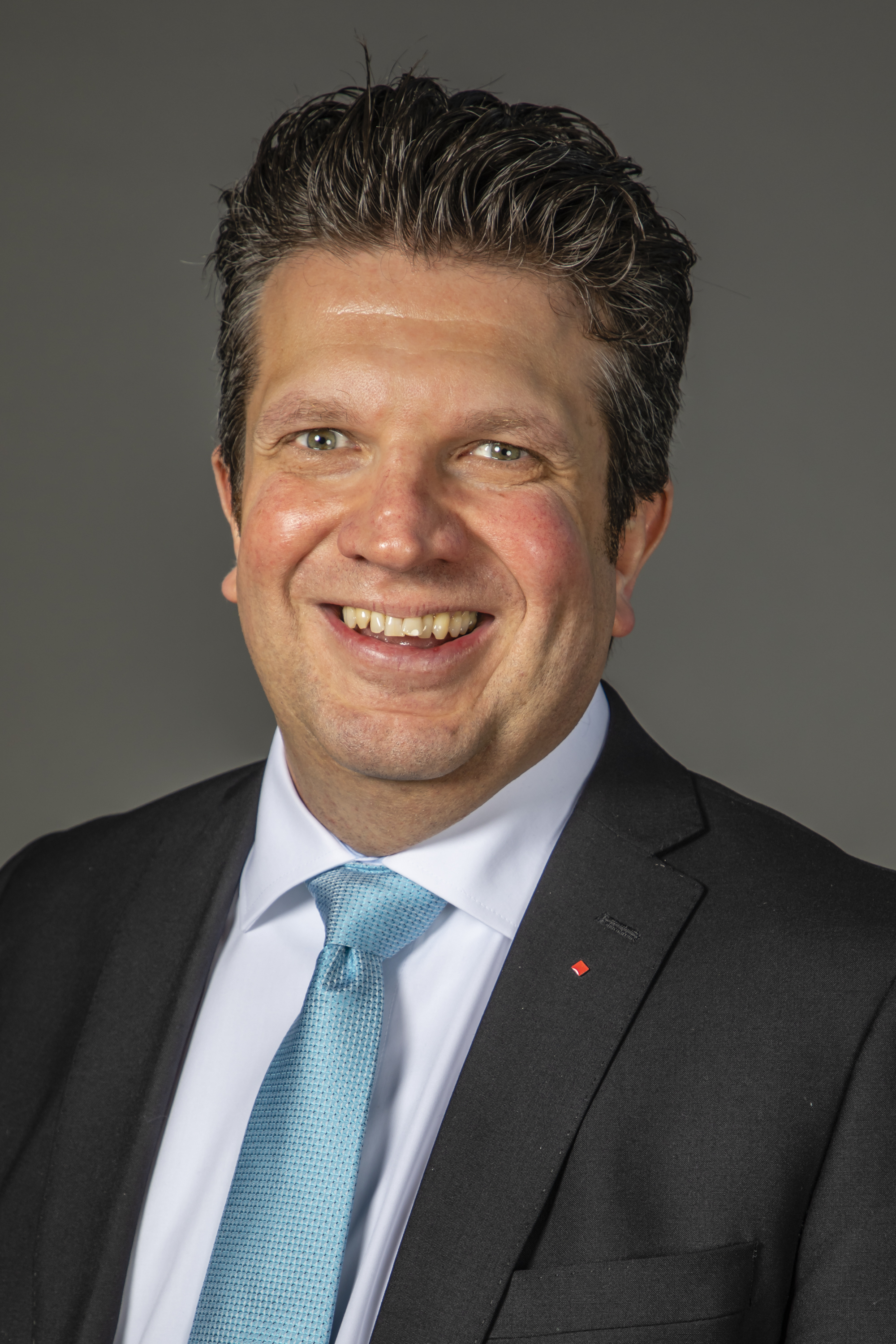
- Dudas in 2019

Member of the Landtag of North Rhine-Westphalia
- Incumbent
- Assumed office 9 June 2010

Personal details
- Born: 26 January 1971 (age 55)
- Party: Social Democratic Party (since 1987)

Gordan Dudas (born 26 January 1971) is a German politician serving as a member of the Landtag of North Rhine-Westphalia since 2010. From 2016 to 2023, he served as chairman of the Social Democratic Party in the Märkischer Kreis.
