= Gábor Molnár (weightlifter) =

Hungarian weightlifter

Personal information
- Born: 28 March 1972 (age 53) Budapest, Hungary
- Height: 164 cm (5 ft 5 in)
- Weight: 68.64 kg (151.3 lb)

Sport
- Country: Hungary
- Sport: Weightlifting
- Weight class: 69 kg
- Club: BKV Előre SC, Budapest (HUN)
- Team: National team
- Updated on 3 October 2016

Gábor Molnár (born 28 March 1972 in Budapest) is a Hungarian male weightlifter, competing in the 69 kg category and representing Hungary at international competitions. He participated at the 1996 Summer Olympics in the 70 kg event. He competed at world championships, most recently at the 1998 World Weightlifting Championships.

== Major results ==
Year	Venue	Weight	Snatch (kg)					Clean & Jerk (kg)					Total	Rank
Year	Venue	Weight	1	2	3	Result	Rank	1	2	3	Result	Rank	Total	Rank
Representing Hungary
Summer Olympics
1996	Atlanta, United States	70 kg	~~145.0~~	~~145.0~~	~~145.0~~	—	—	—	—	—	—	—	—	—
World Championships
1998	Lahti, Finland	69 kg	145.0	150.0	~~155.0~~	150.0	8	~~175.0~~	~~175.0~~	~~175.0~~	—	—	—	—
European Championships
1995	Warsaw, Poland	70 kg	—N/a	—N/a	—N/a	140.0	7	—N/a	—N/a	—N/a	165.0	14	305.0	10
1993	Sofia, Bulgaria	70 kg	—N/a	—N/a	—N/a	140.0	7	—N/a	—N/a	—N/a	165.0	13	305.0	12
