= Andrei Chemerkin =

Russian weightlifter (1972–2025)

Personal information
- Full name: Andrey Ivanovich Chemerkin
- Born: 17 February 1972 Solnechnodolsk, Stavropol Krai, Russian SFSR, USSR
- Died: 12 September 2025 (aged 53)
- Height: 1.83 m (6 ft 0 in)
- Weight: 168 kg (370 lb) (2002)
Medal record
Men's weightlifting
Representing Russia
Olympic Games
Gold medal – first place	1996 Atlanta	+108 kg
Bronze medal – third place	2000 Sydney	+105 kg
World Weightlifting Championships
Gold medal – first place	1995 Guangzhou	+108 kg
Gold medal – first place	1997 Chiang Mai	+108 kg
Gold medal – first place	1998 Lahti	+105 kg
Gold medal – first place	1999 Athens	+105 kg
Silver medal – second place	1994 Istanbul	+108 kg
Bronze medal – third place	1993 Melbourne	+108 kg
Bronze medal – third place	2001 Antalya	+105 kg
European Weightlifting Championships
Gold medal – first place	1994 Sokolov	+108 kg
Gold medal – first place	1995 Warszawa	+108 kg
Silver medal – second place	1993 Sofia	+108 kg
Silver medal – second place	1998 Riesa	+105 kg

Andrey Ivanovich Chemerkin (Russian: Андрей Иванович Чемеркин, 17 February 1972 – 12 September 2025) was a Russian weightlifter. Chemerkin was a gold medallist at the 1996 Summer Olympics, and a bronze medalist at the 2000 Summer Olympics.

== Weightlifting achievements ==
- Olympic Games gold medallist (1996).
- 4 time World Weightlifting Championships gold medallist (1995, 1997, 1998, 1999).
- 2 time European Weightlifting Championships gold medallist (1994, 1995).
- Set 7 world records during his career
- 1991 - 1992 junior world weightlifting champion and a Russian championship winner known as the three warriors tournament

Chemerkin was the winner of the World Weightlifting Championships for university year 2000 but not a Senior Championship, and he attempted the all time heaviest clean and jerk 272.5 kg (601 lb) in the 2000 Olympics which he needed to win. In addition, he was a winner of several Russian Championships. At the time he won the Olympic Games in 1996 he snatched 197.5 kg (436 lb), followed by a clean and jerk of 260 kg (573 lb) to total 457.5 kg (1010 lb).

=== Career bests ===
- Snatch – 202.5 kg (446 lb) at the 2000 Summer Olympics
- Clean and jerk – 262.5 kg (579 lb) (former world record in 1997)
- Total – 462.5 kg (1021 lb) (200+262.5) 1997 World Weightlifting Championships

== Death ==
Chemerkin died on 12 September 2025, at the age of 53.
