= Mukhran Gogia =

Georgian weightlifter (born 1971)

Mukhran Gogia (Georgian: მუხრან გოგია; born August 16, 1971, in Zugdidi, Samegrelo-Zemo Svaneti) is a retired male weightlifter from Georgia. He qualified for the 1996 Summer Olympics, but eventually did not start in Atlanta, Georgia. Four years later Gogia had to retire after one snatch after having finished fourth in the men's heavyweight division (– 105 kg) at the 1999 World Weightlifting Championships. Gogia now is a truck driver for Zen Auto Transport LLC out of Southampton, PA.
