= Lan Shizhang =

Chinese weightlifter (born 1974)

Medal record

Men's weightlifting

Representing China

World Championships
Gold medal – first place	1997 Chiang Mai	–54 kg
Silver medal – second place	1998 Lahti	–56 kg
Bronze medal – third place	1995 Guangzhou	–54 kg

Asian Games
Gold medal – first place	1994 Hiroshima	–54 kg
Gold medal – first place	1998 Bangkok	–56 kg

Junior World Championships
Gold medal – first place	1994 Jakarta	–54 kg

Lan Shizhang (Chinese: 兰世章; born 9 February 1974) is a Chinese weightlifter. He is 152 cm tall (5 ft 0 inches). He competed in the 1990s, winning several medals at World Championships and Asian Games. He lifted at the 1996 Olympic Games in Atlanta, finishing fourth in his class.

Lan is one of the few men in history to clean and jerk three times his own bodyweight with a lift of 162.5kg at 54kg, done at the 1997 National Games.

He's an uncle of weightlifter and 2008 Olympic champion Lu Yong.
