= 1997 World Weightlifting Championships =

International weightlifting competition

1997 World Championships
- Host city: Chiang Mai, Thailand
- Dates: 6–14 December

The 1997 World Weightlifting Championships were held in Chiang Mai, Thailand from December 6 to December 14, 1997. In the men's tournament there were a total number of 189 athletes (51 nations) competing, while there were 143 women in action from 29 nations.

== Medal summary ==
=== Men ===
Event	Gold		Silver		Bronze	
54 kg
Snatch	Yang Bin; China	127.5 kg	Lan Shizhang; China	127.5 kg	Wang Shin-yuan; Chinese Taipei	115.0 kg
Clean & Jerk	Lan Shizhang; China	160.5 kg WR	Wang Shin-yuan; Chinese Taipei	147.5 kg	Nayden Rusev; Bulgaria	147.5 kg
Total	Lan Shizhang; China	287.5 kg	Yang Bin; China	272.5 kg	Wang Shin-yuan; Chinese Taipei	262.5 kg
59 kg
Snatch	William Vargas; Cuba	132.5 kg	Stefan Georgiev; Bulgaria	130.0 kg	Le Maosheng; China	130.0 kg
Clean & Jerk	Stefan Georgiev; Bulgaria	165.0 kg	Le Maosheng; China	165.0 kg	Sevdalin Minchev; Bulgaria	162.5 kg
Total	Stefan Georgiev; Bulgaria	295.0 kg	Le Maosheng; China	295.0 kg	Sevdalin Minchev; Bulgaria	290.0 kg
64 kg
Snatch	Wang Guohua; China	147.5 kg	Hafız Süleymanoğlu; Turkey	145.0 kg	Xiao Jiangang; China	142.5 kg
Clean & Jerk	Xiao Jiangang; China	175.0 kg	Asif Malikov; Azerbaijan	172.5 kg	Valentin Sarov; Bulgaria	170.0 kg
Total	Xiao Jiangang; China	317.5 kg	Hafız Süleymanoğlu; Turkey	315.0 kg	Asif Malikov; Azerbaijan	305.0 kg
70 kg
Snatch	Zlatan Vanev; Bulgaria	160.0 kg	Zhan Xugang; China	157.5 kg	Wan Jianhui; China	155.0 kg
Clean & Jerk	Zlatan Vanev; Bulgaria	195.0 kg	Zhan Xugang; China	195.5 kg WR	Kim Hak-bong; South Korea	185.0 kg
Total	Zlatan Vanev; Bulgaria	355.0 kg	Zhan Xugang; China	352.5 kg	Wan Jianhui; China	340.0 kg
76 kg
Snatch	Georgi Gardev; Bulgaria	167.5 kg	Waldemar Kosiński; Poland	165.0 kg	Yoto Yotov; Bulgaria	165.0 kg
Clean & Jerk	Yoto Yotov; Bulgaria	202.5 kg	Andrzej Kozłowski; Poland	200.0 kg	Waldemar Kosiński; Poland	197.5 kg
Total	Yoto Yotov; Bulgaria	367.5 kg	Georgi Gardev; Bulgaria	365.0 kg	Waldemar Kosiński; Poland	362.5 kg
83 kg
Snatch	Andrzej Cofalik; Poland	172.5 kg	Yury Myshkovets; Russia	172.5 kg	Dursun Sevinç; Turkey	170.0 kg
Clean & Jerk	Zhang Yong; China	207.5 kg	Krzysztof Siemion; Poland	207.5 kg	Andrzej Cofalik; Poland	207.5 kg
Total	Andrzej Cofalik; Poland	380.0 kg	Dursun Sevinç; Turkey	375.0 kg	Krzysztof Siemion; Poland	372.5 kg
91 kg
Snatch	Tadeusz Drzazga; Poland	177.5 kg	Maksim Agapitov; Russia	175.0 kg	Andrey Makarov; Kazakhstan	170.0 kg
Clean & Jerk	Julio Luna; Venezuela	212.5 kg	Maksim Agapitov; Russia	205.0 kg	Oleh Chumak; Ukraine	200.0 kg
Total	Maksim Agapitov; Russia	380.0 kg	Tadeusz Drzazga; Poland	377.5 kg	Julio Luna; Venezuela	377.5 kg
99 kg
Snatch	Martin Tešovič; Slovakia	180.0 kg	Choi Jong-kun; South Korea	177.5 kg	Lorenzo Carrió; Spain	172.5 kg
Clean & Jerk	Martin Tešovič; Slovakia	220.0 kg	Ernesto Montoya; Cuba	215.0 kg	Oleksiy Obukhov; Ukraine	212.5 kg
Total	Martin Tešovič; Slovakia	400.0 kg	Choi Jong-kun; South Korea	387.5 kg	Oleksiy Obukhov; Ukraine	385.0 kg
108 kg
Snatch	Cui Wenhua; China	195.0 kg	Evgeny Shishlyannikov; Russia	190.0 kg	Sergey Syrtsov; Russia	185.0 kg
Clean & Jerk	Cui Wenhua; China	220.0 kg	Wes Barnett; United States	220.0 kg	Mariusz Jędra; Poland	217.5 kg
Total	Cui Wenhua; China	415.0 kg	Mariusz Jędra; Poland	392.5 kg	Wes Barnett; United States	390.0 kg
+108 kg
Snatch	Ronny Weller; Germany	200.0 kg	Andrey Chemerkin; Russia	200.0 kg	Viktors Ščerbatihs; Latvia	187.5 kg
Clean & Jerk	Andrey Chemerkin; Russia	262.5 kg WR	Ronny Weller; Germany	250.0 kg	Viktors Ščerbatihs; Latvia	225.0 kg
Total	Andrey Chemerkin; Russia	462.5 kg WR	Ronny Weller; Germany	450.0 kg	Viktors Ščerbatihs; Latvia	412.5 kg

=== Women ===
Event	Gold		Silver		Bronze	
46 kg
Snatch	Kyi Kyi Than; Myanmar	77.5 kg	Liu Ling; China	75.0 kg	Sri Indriyani; Indonesia	75.0 kg
Clean & Jerk	Liu Ling; China	100.0 kg	Kunjarani Devi; India	97.5 kg	Sri Indriyani; Indonesia	95.0 kg
Total	Liu Ling; China	175.0 kg	Kunjarani Devi; India	170.0 kg	Sri Indriyani; Indonesia	170.0 kg
50 kg
Snatch	Zhong Yan; China	85.0 kg	Izabela Dragneva; Bulgaria	82.5 kg	Winarni Binti Slamet; Indonesia	80.0 kg
Clean & Jerk	Winarni Binti Slamet; Indonesia	105.0 kg	Izabela Dragneva; Bulgaria	102.5 kg	Swe Swe Win; Myanmar	100.0 kg
Total	Winarni Binti Slamet; Indonesia	185.0 kg	Izabela Dragneva; Bulgaria	185.0 kg	Ri Yong-hwa; North Korea	180.0 kg
54 kg
Snatch	Meng Xianjuan; China	87.5 kg	Khin Moe Nwe; Myanmar	85.0 kg	Kuo Ping-chun; Chinese Taipei	85.0 kg
Clean & Jerk	Meng Xianjuan; China	117.5 kg WR	Ri Song-hui; North Korea	110.0 kg	Saipin Detsaeng; Thailand	110.0 kg
Total	Meng Xianjuan; China	205.0 kg	Ri Song-hui; North Korea	195.0 kg	Saipin Detsaeng; Thailand	195.0 kg
59 kg
Snatch	Patmawati Abdul Hamid; Indonesia	97.5 kg	Khassaraporn Suta; Thailand	92.5 kg	Wu Mei-yi; Chinese Taipei	92.5 kg
Clean & Jerk	Khassaraporn Suta; Thailand	117.5 kg	Naw Ju Ni; Myanmar	117.5 kg	Patmawati Abdul Hamid; Indonesia	115.0 kg
Total	Patmawati Abdul Hamid; Indonesia	212.5 kg	Khassaraporn Suta; Thailand	210.0 kg	Naw Ju Ni; Myanmar	207.5 kg
64 kg
Snatch	Chen Jui-lien; Chinese Taipei	102.5 kg	Chen Yanqing; China	100.0 kg	Neelam Setti Laxmi; India	100.0 kg
Clean & Jerk	Chen Yanqing; China	131.0 kg WR	Chen Jui-lien; Chinese Taipei	122.5 kg	Lu Yun; China	122.5 kg
Total	Chen Yanqing; China	230.0 kg	Chen Jui-lien; Chinese Taipei	225.0 kg	Neelam Setti Laxmi; India	217.5 kg
70 kg
Snatch	Xiang Fenglan; China	105.5 kg WR	Ilona Dankó; Hungary	100.0 kg	Huang Hsi-li; Chinese Taipei	97.5 kg
Clean & Jerk	Xiang Fenglan; China	130.5 kg WR	Irina Kasimova; Russia	122.5 kg	Huang Hsi-li; Chinese Taipei	120.0 kg
Total	Xiang Fenglan; China	235.0 kg WR	Huang Hsi-li; Chinese Taipei	217.5 kg	Ilona Dankó; Hungary	215.0 kg
76 kg
Snatch	Hua Ju; China	107.5 kg WR	Mária Takács; Hungary	100.0 kg	Mónica Carrió; Spain	97.5 kg
Clean & Jerk	Hua Ju; China	140.5 kg WR	Kim Soon-hee; South Korea	125.0 kg	Mária Takács; Hungary	125.0 kg
Total	Hua Ju; China	247.5 kg WR	Mária Takács; Hungary	225.0 kg	Kim Soon-hee; South Korea	220.0 kg
83 kg
Snatch	Tang Weifang; China	117.5 kg WR	Albina Khomich; Russia	107.5 kg	María Isabel Urrutia; Colombia	105.0 kg
Clean & Jerk	Tang Weifang; China	143.0 kg WR	María Isabel Urrutia; Colombia	130.0 kg	Aye Mon Khin; Myanmar	127.5 kg
Total	Tang Weifang; China	260.0 kg WR	María Isabel Urrutia; Colombia	235.0 kg	Aye Mon Khin; Myanmar	227.5 kg
+83 kg
Snatch	Aye Aye Aung; Myanmar	110.0 kg	Balkisu Musa; Nigeria	107.5 kg	Ma Runmei; China	107.5 kg
Clean & Jerk	Ma Runmei; China	145.0 kg	Chen Hsiao-lien; Chinese Taipei	137.5 kg	Chen Shu-chih; Chinese Taipei	135.0 kg
Total	Ma Runmei; China	252.5 kg	Chen Shu-chih; Chinese Taipei	240.0 kg	Aye Aye Aung; Myanmar	240.0 kg

== Medal table ==
Ranking by Big (Total result) medals

Rank	Nation	Gold	Silver	Bronze	Total
1	China	10	3	1	14
2	Bulgaria	3	2	1	6
3	Indonesia	2	0	1	3
4	Russia	2	0	0	2
5	Poland	1	2	2	5
6	Slovakia	1	0	0	1
7	Chinese Taipei	0	3	1	4
8	Turkey	0	2	0	2
9	Hungary	0	1	1	2
9	India	0	1	1	2
9	North Korea	0	1	1	2
9	South Korea	0	1	1	2
9	Thailand	0	1	1	2
14	Colombia	0	1	0	1
14	Germany	0	1	0	1
16	Myanmar	0	0	3	3
17	Azerbaijan	0	0	1	1
17	Latvia	0	0	1	1
17	Ukraine	0	0	1	1
17	United States	0	0	1	1
17	Venezuela	0	0	1	1
Totals (21 entries)		19	19	19	57

Ranking by all medals: Big (Total result) and Small (Snatch and Clean & Jerk)

Rank	Nation	Gold	Silver	Bronze	Total
1	China	29	9	6	44
2	Bulgaria	8	5	5	18
3	Indonesia	4	0	5	9
4	Russia	3	7	1	11
5	Poland	3	5	5	13
6	Slovakia	3	0	0	3
7	Myanmar	2	2	5	9
8	Chinese Taipei	1	6	7	14
9	Thailand	1	2	2	5
10	Germany	1	2	0	3
11	Cuba	1	1	0	2
12	Venezuela	1	0	1	2
13	Hungary	0	3	2	5
13	South Korea	0	3	2	5
15	Turkey	0	3	1	4
16	India	0	2	2	4
17	Colombia	0	2	1	3
17	North Korea	0	2	1	3
19	Azerbaijan	0	1	1	2
19	United States	0	1	1	2
21	Nigeria	0	1	0	1
22	Latvia	0	0	3	3
22	Ukraine	0	0	3	3
24	Spain	0	0	2	2
25	Kazakhstan	0	0	1	1
Totals (25 entries)		57	57	57	171

== Team ranking ==
=== Men ===
Rank	Team	Points
1	China	643
2	Bulgaria	521
3	Turkey	507
4	Russia	458
5	Poland	433
6	Egypt	343

=== Women ===
Rank	Team	Points
1	China	666
2	Myanmar	510
3	India	508
4	Thailand	499
5	Chinese Taipei	480
6	Russia	366

== Participating nations ==
332 competitors from 58 nations competed.

- Algeria (1)
- Argentina (2)
- Armenia (4)
- Australia (11)
- Austria (3)
- Azerbaijan (3)
- Belgium (2)
- Bulgaria (9)
- Canada (7)
- Chile (1)
- China (19)
- Chinese Taipei (19)
- Colombia (1)
- Cuba (4)
- Czech Republic (4)
- Denmark (1)
- Egypt (11)
- Finland (4)
- France (4)
- Germany (6)
- Great Britain (5)
- Greece (6)
- Hungary (6)
- India (9)
- Indonesia (3)
- Iraq (2)
- Israel (1)
- Italy (9)
- Japan (11)
- Kazakhstan (7)
- Kyrgyzstan (1)
- Latvia (5)
- Lithuania (1)
- Malaysia (2)
- Mexico (1)
- Moldova (3)
- Myanmar (9)
- Nauru (5)
- Netherlands (3)
- New Zealand (2)
- Nigeria (2)
- North Korea (5)
- Norway (2)
- Poland (8)
- Romania (6)
- Russia (16)
- Slovakia (6)
- South Korea (8)
- Spain (8)
- Sweden (2)
- Switzerland (1)
- Thailand (19)
- Turkey (17)
- Ukraine (7)
- United States (8)
- Uruguay (1)
- Uzbekistan (4)
- Venezuela (5)
