= Aleksey Petrov (weightlifter) =

Russian weightlifter (born 1974)

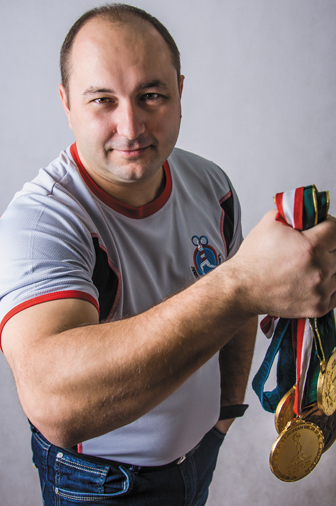
- Petrov in 2013

Personal information
- Full name: Aleksei Aleksandrovich Petrov
- Nationality: Russian
- Born: 8 September 1974 (age 52) Volgograd, Soviet Union
- Height: 1.70 m (5 ft 7 in) (2003)
- Weight: 94 kg (207 lb) (2003)

Sport
- Country: Russia
- Sport: Olympic weightlifting
- Events: 91 kg 94 kg
- Club: Kuntsevo Moscow
- Turned pro: 1994
- Retired: 2006

Achievements and titles
- Personal bests: Snatch: 187.5 kg (1996); Clean & Jerk: 228 kg (1994); Total: 412.5 kg (1994)
Medal record
Men's weightlifting
Representing Russia
Olympic Games
Gold medal – first place	1996 Atlanta	-91 kg
Bronze medal – third place	2000 Sydney	-94 kg
World Championships
Gold medal – first place	1994 Istanbul	-91 kg
European Championships
Gold medal – first place	1994 Sokolov	-91 kg
Gold medal – first place	2002 Antalya	-94 kg
- Updated on 23 August 2013

Aleksei Aleksandrovich Petrov (Russian: Алексей Александрович Петров; born 8 September 1974) is a retired Russian weightlifter. He had his peak performance in 1994, when he won the European and world titles and set four world records: one in the snatch, two in the clean and jerk, and one in the total. In 1996, he won gold in the 91 kg (201 lb) class at the 1996 Olympics and set his second world record in the snatch. At the 2000 Olympics he finished third in the 94 kg (207 lb) class. His last international success was a European gold achieved in 2002. The Russian Olympic Committee selected younger competitors in favor of Petrov for the 2004 Olympics, partly because of his injuries, excessive weight, and a failed drug test. Meanwhile, his season best was 10 kg (22 lb) higher than the gold medal result at those Olympics.

Petrov graduated from the Volgograd Academy of Physical Education. His weightlifting idol was David Rigert, and his first coaches were his father and elder brother. In 2004 he got engaged, had a daughter born the following year and officially retired from competition in 2006. In 2009, he became deputy director of sport administration of Volgograd.
