= Tang Lingsheng =

Chinese weightlifter (born 1971)

Medal record

Representing China

Men's Weightlifting

Olympic Games
Gold medal – first place	1996 Atlanta	-59 kg

Tang Lingsheng (born 10 January 1971 in Lingui, Guangxi) is a male Chinese weightlifter.

== Major performances ==
- 1989 National Junior Games - 3rd 56 kg (262.5 kg);
- 1991 National Inter-city Games - 2nd 60 kg (280 kg);
- 1992 National Championships - 3rd 60 kg (295 kg);
- 1993 World Championships - 3rd 59 kg (292.5 kg);
- 1994 Asian Games - 2nd 59 kg
- 1995 Asian Championships - Winning three titles and breaking an AR;
- 1995 World Championships - 1st 59 kg in clean and jerk;
- 1996 Atlanta Olympic Games - 1st 59 kg (WR);
