= Asif Malikov =

Azerbaijani weightlifter (born 1971)

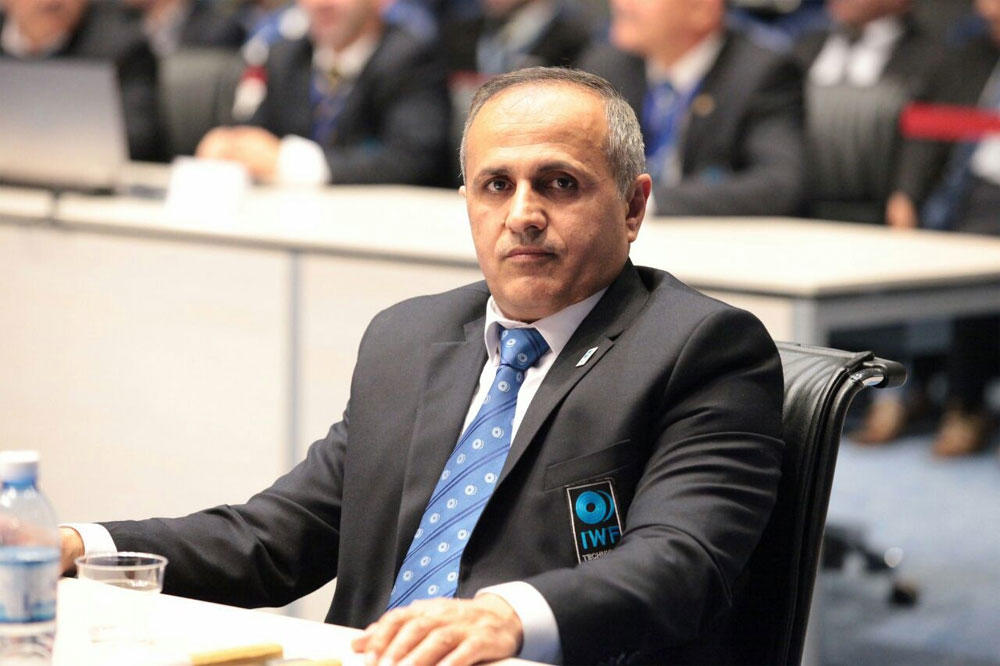

Medal record

Men's Weightlifting

Representing Azerbaijan

World Championships
Bronze medal – third place	1997 Chiang Mai	– 64 kg

European Championships
Bronze medal – third place	2004 Kyiv	– 62 kg

Asif Malikov (Azerbaijani: Asif Məlikov; born April 13, 1971, in İsmayıllı) is a retired Olympic weightlifter for Azerbaijan.
