= Oleh Chumak =

Ukrainian weightlifter

Personal information
- Nationality: Ukrainian
- Born: 22 May 1970 (age 56) Voroshilovgrad, Ukrainian SSR, Soviet Union

Sport
- Sport: Weightlifting
Medal record
Men's Weightlifting
Representing Ukraine
European Championships
Bronze medal – third place	1997 Rijeka	91 kg

Oleh Chumak (born 22 May 1970) is a Ukrainian weightlifter. He competed in the men's middle heavyweight event at the 1996 Summer Olympics.
