= Xiao Jiangang =

Chinese weightlifter (born 1972)

Personal information
- Born: November 12, 1972 (age 53)
Medal record
Men's Weightlifting
Olympic Games
Bronze medal – third place	1996 Atlanta	– 64 kg
World Championships
Gold medal – first place	1997 Chiangmai	– 64 kg

Xiao Jiangang (Chinese: 肖建刚; born November 12, 1972) is a male Chinese weightlifter. He competed at 1996 Atlanta Olympics, and won a bronze medal in Men's 64 kg.
