= Gyöngyi Likerecz =

Hungarian weightlifter (born 1983)

Personal information
- Born: 28 May 1983 (age 43) Oroszlány, Komárom-Esztergom, Hungary
Medal record
Women's Weightlifting
Representing Hungary
World Championships
Gold medal – first place	2001 Antalya	– 75 kg

Gyöngyi Likerecz (born 28 May 1983, Oroszlány, Komárom-Esztergom) is a retired female weightlifter from Hungary. She twice competed for her native country at the Summer Olympics (2000 and 2004) in the women's heavyweight division (– 75 kg). Likerecz was named Hungarian Sportswoman of the Year in 2001 after having won the world title the same year in Antalya, Turkey.

Awards
Preceded by Ágnes Kovács	Hungarian Sportswoman of The Year; 2001	Succeeded by Katalin Kovács
