= Wang Guohua =

Chinese weightlifter

Personal information
- Nationality: Chinese
- Born: 30 January 1975 (age 50)

Sport
- Sport: Weightlifting

Wang Guohua (born 30 January 1975) is a Chinese weightlifter. He competed in the men's featherweight event at the 1996 Summer Olympics.
