= Sergey Syrtsov (weightlifter) =

Soviet weightlifter

Olympic medal record

Men's weightlifting

Representing the Unified Team
Silver medal – second place	1992 Barcelona	-90 kg

Representing Russia
Silver medal – second place	1996 Atlanta	-108 kg

Sergey Alexandrovich Syrtsov (Russian: Серге́й Александрович Сырцов) (born October 25, 1966) is a former Soviet/Russian weightlifter.

== Weightlifting achievements ==
- Senior world champion (1991, 1994);
- Senior European champion (1994, 1995);
- Set seven world records during his career.
