= Weightlifting at the 2009 Pacific Mini Games =

Weightlifting at the 2009 Pacific Mini Games was held at the Telecom Sports Arena in the Cook Islands capital of Rarotonga on 29 September – 1 October 2009.

Fourteen nations had registered a total of 81 athletes for weightlifting, of which 57 took part in the competition. Only Tahiti did not win a medal.

== Medal summary ==
=== Medal table ===
Rank	Nation	Gold	Silver	Bronze	Total
1	Samoa	13	4	5	22
2	Kiribati	9	3	6	18
3	Fiji	8	3	6 ^{a}	17 ^{a}
4	Nauru	6	3	0	9
5	Federated States of Micronesia	3	0	0	3
6	Niue	0	6	0	6
7	Solomon Islands	0	6	0	6
8	New Caledonia	0	3	4	7
9	Cook Islands	0	3	2	5
10	Palau	0	3	0	3
11	Tonga	0	2	4 ^{a}	6 ^{a}
12	Tuvalu	0	0	3	3
13	American Samoa	0	0	1	1
	Medals awarded	39	36	31	106
	Medals not awarded	0	3	8	11 ^{b}
Totals		39	39	39	117

The host country is highlighted in lavender blue
Some sources have one more bronze medal for Fiji and one fewer for Tonga. See notes below.^{a}

=== Men ===
Eight weight classes were contested for men, with three sets of medals offered within each class for the Snatch, Clean & Jerk, and Total lifts.

Event	Gold	Silver	Bronze
−56 kg Snatch	Manueli Tulo; Fiji	Elson Brechtefeld; Nauru	Lapua Lapua Tuau; Tuvalu
−56 kg Clean & Jerk	Manueli Tulo; Fiji	Elson Brechtefeld; Nauru	Lapua Lapua Tuau; Tuvalu
−56 kg Total	Manueli Tulo; Fiji	Elson Brechtefeld; Nauru	Lapua Lapua Tuau; Tuvalu
−62 kg Snatch	Manuel Minginfel; F.S. Micronesia	Stevick Patris; Palau	Takenibeia Toromon; Kiribati
−62 kg Clean & Jerk	Manuel Minginfel; F.S. Micronesia	Stevick Patris; Palau	Takenibeia Toromon; Kiribati
−62 kg Total	Manuel Minginfel; F.S. Micronesia	Stevick Patris; Palau	Takenibeia Toromon; Kiribati
−69 kg Snatch ^{a}	Tekaei Temake; Kiribati	Taofitu Perive; Samoa	Ilaniume Finau ^{a} Tonga
−69 kg Clean & Jerk	Tekaei Temake; Kiribati	Ilaniume Finau; Tonga	Bill Andrews; Fiji
−69 kg Total	Tekaei Temake; Kiribati	Ilaniume Finau; Tonga	Bill Andrews; Fiji
−77 kg Snatch	Faavae Faauliuli; Samoa	Josefa Vueti; Fiji	Taubena Tatonga; Kiribati
−77 kg Clean & Jerk	Josefa Vueti; Fiji	Faavae Faauliuli; Samoa	Taubena Tatonga; Kiribati
−77 kg Total	Josefa Vueti; Fiji	Faavae Faauliuli; Samoa	Taubena Tatonga; Kiribati
−85 kg Snatch	Yukio Peter; Nauru	Beru Karianako; Kiribati	Igor Lagikula; New Caledonia
−85 kg Clean & Jerk	Yukio Peter; Nauru	Beru Karianako; Kiribati	Sirla Pera; Cook Islands
−85 kg Total	Yukio Peter; Nauru	Beru Karianako; Kiribati	Sirla Pera; Cook Islands
−94 kg Snatch	David Katoatau; Kiribati	Saimone Turaganivalu; Fiji	Jonathan Yoshida; Samoa
−94 kg Clean & Jerk	David Katoatau; Kiribati	Saimone Turaganivalu; Fiji	Jonathan Yoshida; Samoa
−94 kg Total	David Katoatau; Kiribati	Saimone Turaganivalu; Fiji	Jonathan Yoshida; Samoa
−105 kg Snatch	Meameaa Thomas; Kiribati	Amete Luaki; New Caledonia	Tovia Opeloge; Samoa
−105 kg Clean & Jerk	Meameaa Thomas; Kiribati	Amete Luaki; New Caledonia	Tovia Opeloge; Samoa
−105 kg Total	Meameaa Thomas; Kiribati	Amete Luaki; New Caledonia	Tovia Opeloge; Samoa
+105 kg Snatch	Itte Detenamo; Nauru	Samuel Pera; Cook Islands	Theron Taupau; American Samoa
+105 kg Clean & Jerk	Itte Detenamo; Nauru	Samuel Pera; Cook Islands	Maamaloa Lolohea; Tonga
+105 kg Total	Itte Detenamo; Nauru	Samuel Pera; Cook Islands	Maamaloa Lolohea; Tonga

=== Women ===
Five weight classes were contested for women, with three set of medals offered within each class for the Snatch, Clean & Jerk, and Total lifts.

Event	Gold	Silver	Bronze
−58 kg Snatch	Maria Liku; Fiji	Not awarded^{b}	Not awarded^{b}
−58 kg Clean & Jerk	Maria Liku; Fiji	Not awarded^{b}	Not awarded^{b}
−58 kg Total	Maria Liku; Fiji	Not awarded^{b}	Not awarded^{b}
−63 kg Snatch	Faitoa Togagae; Samoa	Jenly Tegu Wini; Solomon Islands	Not awarded^{b}
−63 kg Clean & Jerk	Faitoa Togagae; Samoa	Jenly Tegu Wini; Solomon Islands	Not awarded^{b}
−63 kg Total	Faitoa Togagae; Samoa	Jenly Tegu Wini; Solomon Islands	Not awarded^{b}
−69 kg Snatch	Tauimani Ah Kuoi; Samoa	Hapilyn Iro; Solomon Islands	Raijeli Tagua; Fiji
−69 kg Clean & Jerk	Tauimani Ah Kuoi; Samoa	Hapilyn Iro; Solomon Islands	Raijeli Tagua; Fiji
−69 kg Total	Tauimani Ah Kuoi; Samoa	Hapilyn Iro; Solomon Islands	Raijeli Tagua; Fiji
−75 kg Snatch	Mary Opeloge; Samoa	Tamyrah Mautama; Niue	Not awarded^{b}
−75 kg Clean & Jerk	Mary Opeloge; Samoa	Tamyrah Mautama; Niue	Molilaau Tressa Kailea; Tonga
−75 kg Total	Mary Opeloge; Samoa	Tamyrah Mautama; Niue	Not awarded^{b}
+75 kg Snatch	Ele Opeloge; Samoa	Narita Viliamu; Niue	Noeline Luaki; New Caledonia
+75 kg Clean & Jerk	Ele Opeloge; Samoa	Narita Viliamu; Niue	Noeline Luaki; New Caledonia
+75 kg Total	Ele Opeloge; Samoa	Narita Viliamu; Niue	Noeline Luaki; New Caledonia

== Notes ==
^ a The medal tally for weightlifting as recorded on pages 38–39 of the VIIIth Pacific Mini Games Report, corresponds with the men's and women's tallies from the official website's Results, except for one anomaly. The report lists seven bronze medals (one extra) for Fiji and three bronze medals (one fewer) for Tonga. The extra bronze medal for Fiji is contradicted by Weightlifting Fiji in their annual report published a month after the competition: "Fiji won eight gold, three silver and six bronze medals in weightlifting at the 2009 Pacific Mini Games".

1. A possible source for this anomaly is within the records for the men's 69 kg class, as marked up with a (sky blue background) in the tables above. The official website's Medal Winners, has Bill Andrews of Fiji listed as the bronze medallist for all three events (note also: This list contains other errors including nationality mismatches. e.g. Fijians are listed as from Niue, and New Caledonians as from Federated States of Micronesia). However, the official website's Results has Ilaniume Finau of Tonga as the bronze medallist in the Men's 69 kg Snatch.
2. Other sources also indicate that Fiji's Bill Andrews won only two of the three bronze medals in the 69 kg class, including Weightlifting Fiji's Annual Report. and news outlets including the Fiji Sun, Other reports confirm Samoa's Toafitu Perive took silver in the Men's 69 kg Snatch, not Ilaniume Finau of Tonga.
3. In the absence of other evidence (such as a disqualification causing the Fijian to be promoted) the tallies from the official website's Results, are used for this page.

^ b Some medals were not awarded if there were insufficient competitors in the field. There was no silver or bronze medal given for any of the three events in the Women's 58kg class, and no bronze medal given for any of the three events in the Women's 63kg class. Only one bronze medal was given for the Women's 75kg class because a successful third-placed lift was completed in the clean and jerk but not for the snatch.
