= 2011 World Weightlifting Championships – Men's 77 kg =

The men's competition in the middleweight (– 77 kg) division was held on 9–10 November 2011.

== Schedule ==
Date	Time	Event
9 November 2011	11:30	Group D
9 November 2011	16:30	Group C
10 November 2011	11:00	Group B
10 November 2011	16:30	Group A

== Medalists ==
Event	Gold		Silver		Bronze	
Snatch	Lü Xiaojun (CHN)	170 kg	Su Dajin (CHN)	166 kg	Tigran Martirosyan (ARM)	166 kg
Clean & Jerk	Su Dajin (CHN)	206 kg	Lü Xiaojun (CHN)	205 kg	Sa Jae-hyouk (KOR)	203 kg
Total	Lü Xiaojun (CHN)	375 kg	Su Dajin (CHN)	372 kg	Sa Jae-hyouk (KOR)	360 kg

== Records ==
Prior to this competition, the existing world records were as follows.

World Record	Snatch	Lü Xiaojun (CHN)	174 kg	Goyang, South Korea	24 November 2009
World Record	Clean & Jerk	Oleg Perepetchenov (RUS)	210 kg	Trenčín, Slovakia	27 April 2001
World Record	Total	Lü Xiaojun (CHN)	378 kg	Goyang, South Korea	24 November 2009

== Results ==
Rank	Athlete	Group	Body weight	Snatch (kg)				Clean & Jerk (kg)				Total
Rank	Athlete	Group	Body weight	1	2	3	Rank	1	2	3	Rank	Total
1st place, gold medalist(s)	Lü Xiaojun (CHN)	A	76.45	165	~~170~~	170	1st place, gold medalist(s)	200	205	~~211~~	2nd place, silver medalist(s)	375
2nd place, silver medalist(s)	Su Dajin (CHN)	A	76.80	160	166	~~168~~	2nd place, silver medalist(s)	201	206	~~211~~	1st place, gold medalist(s)	372
3rd place, bronze medalist(s)	Sa Jae-hyouk (KOR)	A	76.94	~~157~~	157	~~165~~	5	197	203	~~211~~	3rd place, bronze medalist(s)	360
4	Tigran Martirosyan (ARM)	A	76.99	162	166	~~168~~	3rd place, bronze medalist(s)	190	~~200~~	~~202~~	6	356
5	Ibrahim Ramadan (EGY)	A	76.56	150	~~155~~	~~155~~	15	191	~~195~~	195	4	345
6	Răzvan Martin (ROU)	B	76.23	152	156	158	4	180	186	~~193~~	9	344
7	Hysen Pulaku (ALB)	A	76.37	~~153~~	153	~~158~~	8	~~187~~	~~187~~	188	8	341
8	Kirill Pavlov (KAZ)	B	76.44	146	151	~~155~~	12	177	183	189	7	340
9	Pang Kum-chol (PRK)	B	76.76	~~150~~	150	~~155~~	16	190	~~195~~	~~195~~	5	340
10	Arakel Mirzoyan (ARM)	B	76.09	145	151	155	6	175	183	~~189~~	13	338
11	Erkand Qerimaj (ALB)	A	76.59	~~152~~	152	~~155~~	11	~~186~~	186	~~190~~	10	338
12	Krzysztof Szramiak (POL)	A	76.99	153	~~156~~	~~156~~	10	184	~~188~~	~~189~~	12	337
13	Chatuphum Chinnawong (THA)	B	76.60	~~146~~	146	~~151~~	20	~~185~~	185	~~189~~	11	331
14	Jakob Neufeld (GER)	C	76.84	141	145	148	18	175	180	183	14	331
15	Felix Ekpo (NGR)	D	76.14	145	150	~~153~~	13	171	180	~~182~~	17	330
16	Chad Vaughn (USA)	B	76.83	~~144~~	144	~~147~~	21	177	181	~~187~~	16	325
17	Adrian Ghișoiu (ROU)	B	76.73	~~148~~	~~148~~	148	17	175	~~183~~	~~183~~	22	323
18	Sandow Nasution (INA)	C	76.86	130	136	140	30	170	180	183	15	323
19	Ricardo Flores (ECU)	C	76.28	135	140	~~142~~	24	175	~~180~~	180	18	320
20	Yoshito Shintani (JPN)	C	76.30	135	140	~~142~~	25	178	~~180~~	~~181~~	19	318
21	Welisson Silva (BRA)	C	76.79	137	~~140~~	140	29	167	172	178	20	318
22	Antonis Martasidis (GRE)	B	76.36	140	~~145~~	~~145~~	27	~~177~~	~~177~~	177	21	317
23	Andrés Mata (ESP)	C	76.79	~~140~~	140	~~145~~	28	~~175~~	175	~~182~~	23	315
24	Muhammad Begaliev (UZB)	C	73.97	135	139	143	22	~~170~~	~~170~~	171	24	314
25	Wu Tsung-ling (TPE)	C	76.01	135	140	~~143~~	23	~~165~~	165	~~171~~	26	305
26	Jack Oliver (GBR)	D	76.35	132	137	140	26	~~155~~	155	160	29	300
27	Milko Tokola (FIN)	D	76.12	130	~~134~~	~~135~~	31	156	161	165	27	295
28	Halil Zorba (GBR)	D	75.69	118	123	125	33	165	~~171~~	~~175~~	25	290
29	Laurent Goyette-Demers (CAN)	D	76.55	125	~~130~~	~~130~~	34	155	160	165	28	290
30	Gaurav Dubey (IND)	D	74.84	125	129	~~132~~	32	~~155~~	155	~~160~~	30	284
31	Rafael Machado (BRA)	D	73.43	117	~~122~~	~~122~~	35	~~145~~	~~146~~	146	32	263
32	Cathal Byrd (IRL)	D	75.52	111	114	~~116~~	36	142	~~146~~	—	33	256
—	Alexandru Dudoglo (MDA)	A	76.38	~~155~~	155	~~157~~	7	—	—	—	—	—
—	Ramzi Bahloul (TUN)	A	76.93	153	~~157~~	~~157~~	9	—	—	—	—	—
—	Semih Yağcı (TUR)	A	76.34	~~150~~	150	~~153~~	14	~~186~~	~~186~~	—	—	—
—	Rami Bahloul (TUN)	B	76.67	142	145	147	19	~~178~~	~~178~~	~~178~~	—	—
—	Dany Termignone (SUI)	D	76.50	~~121~~	~~121~~	~~122~~	—	146	150	~~153~~	31	—
—	Iván Cambar (CUB)	A	76.43	~~150~~	~~150~~	~~150~~	—	—	—	—	—	—
—	Giorgio De Luca (ITA)	B	76.28	~~145~~	~~145~~	~~145~~	—	—	—	—	—	—
—	Krzysztof Zwarycz (POL)	B	77.00	~~140~~	~~140~~	~~140~~	—	—	—	—	—	—
DQ	Karol Samko (SVK)	C	76.58	133	137	~~140~~	—	~~172~~	173	178	—	—
