= Weightlifting at the 2006 Commonwealth Games – Men's 69 kg =

Weightlifting – Men's 69 kg at the 2006 Commonwealth Games
- Venue: Melbourne Exhibition Centre
- Dates: 18 March 2006
- Competitors: 15 from 14 nations
- Winning total weight: 294

Medalists
gold medal	Benjamin Turner	Australia
silver medal	Muhamad Hidayat Hamidon	Malaysia
bronze medal	Sudhir Kumar Chitradurga	India

The Men's 69 kg weightlifting event at the 2006 Commonwealth Games took place at the Melbourne Exhibition Centre on 18 March 2006. The weightlifter from Australia won the gold, lifting a total weight of 294 kg.

== Schedule ==
All times are Australian Eastern Standard Time (UTC+10)

Date	Time	Event
18 March 2006	18:30	Group A

== Records ==
Prior to this competition, the existing world, Commonwealth and Games records were as follows:

World record	Snatch	Georgi Markov (BUL)	165 kg	Sydney, Australia	20 September 2000
World record	Clean & Jerk	Zhang Guozheng (CHN)	197 kg	Qinhuangdao, China	11 September 2003
World record	Total	Galabin Boevski (BUL)	357 kg	Athens, Greece	24 November 1999
Commonwealth record	Snatch	Vencelas Dabaya (CMR)	145 kg	Tunis, Tunisia	4 May 2004
Commonwealth record	Clean & Jerk	Vencelas Dabaya (CMR)	185 kg	Tunis, Tunisia	4 May 2004
Commonwealth record	Total	Vencelas Dabaya (CMR)	330 kg	Tunis, Tunisia	4 May 2004
Games record	Snatch	Muhammad Irfan (PAK)	140 kg	Manchester, Great Britain	31 July 2002
Games record	Clean & Jerk	Vencelas Dabaya (CMR)	170 kg	Manchester, Great Britain	31 July 2002
Games record	Total	Vencelas Dabaya (CMR)	310 kg	Manchester, Great Britain	31 July 2002

== Results ==
Rank	Athlete	Nation	Group	Body weight	Snatch (kg)				Clean & Jerk (kg)				Total
Rank	Athlete	Nation	Group	Body weight	1	2	3	Result	1	2	3	Result	Total
1st place, gold medalist(s)	Benjamin Turner	Australia	A	68.97	125	~~128~~	128	128	158	161	166	166	294
2nd place, silver medalist(s)	Muhamad Hidayat Hamidon	Malaysia	A	68.85	~~125~~	126	130	130	160	163	~~166~~	163	293
3rd place, bronze medalist(s)	Sudhir Kumar Chitradurga	India	A	68.97	126	129	~~131~~	129	156	158	~~160~~	158	287
4	François Etoundi	Cameroon	A	68.78	~~125~~	126	~~131~~	126	155	~~160~~	160	160	286
5	Joel Wilson	Australia	A	68.59	~~122~~	122	127	127	150	156	~~159~~	156	283
6	Mark Spooner	New Zealand	A	68.64	118	123	~~126~~	123	150	156	~~158~~	156	279
7	Francis Luna-Grenier	Canada	A	68.13	~~120~~	120	~~123~~	120	~~156~~	~~156~~	156	156	276
8	Josefa Vueti	Fiji	A	68.79	~~115~~	115	120	120	152	~~160~~	~~167~~	152	272
9	Alexandros Amanatidis	Cyprus	A	68.40	~~108~~	108	114	114	138	~~144~~	145	145	259
10	Renos Doweiya	Nauru	A	68.41	105	~~110~~	110	110	135	140	145	145	255
11	Romeo Simeon	Seychelles	A	68.65	105	~~110~~	110	110	125	130	~~135~~	130	240
12	Logona Esau	Tuvalu	A	67.66	~~98~~	98	~~104~~	98	127	133	138	138	236
13	Magarajen Monien	Mauritius	A	68.73	95	100	105	105	120	~~125~~	~~125~~	120	225
14	Gift Mwewa	Zambia	A	67.33	93	~~97~~	~~100~~	93	120	125	130	130	223
–	Beru Karianako	Kiribati	A	67.49	~~95~~	~~95~~	~~97~~	–	–	–	–	–	–
