= 2011 World Weightlifting Championships – Men's 94 kg =

The men's competition in the middle-heavyweight (– 94 kg) division was held on 11–12 November 2011.

== Schedule ==
Date	Time	Event
11 November 2011	09:00	Group D
11 November 2011	11:30	Group C
11 November 2011	21:30	Group B
12 November 2011	16:30	Group A

== Medalists ==
Event	Gold		Silver		Bronze	
Snatch	Aleksandr Ivanov (RUS)	186 kg	Artem Ivanov (UKR)	186 kg	Kim Min-jae (KOR)	182 kg
Clean & Jerk	Ilya Ilyin (KAZ)	226 kg	Ruslan Nurudinov (UZB)	221 kg	Saeid Mohammadpour (IRI)	221 kg
Total	Ilya Ilyin (KAZ)	407 kg	Artem Ivanov (UKR)	407 kg	Saeid Mohammadpour (IRI)	402 kg

== Records ==
Prior to this competition, the existing world records were as follows.

World Record	Snatch	Akakios Kakiasvilis (GRE)	188 kg	Athens, Greece	27 November 1999
World Record	Clean & Jerk	Szymon Kołecki (POL)	232 kg	Sofia, Bulgaria	29 April 2000
World Record	Total	Akakios Kakiasvilis (GRE)	412 kg	Athens, Greece	27 November 1999

== Results ==
Rank	Athlete	Group	Body weight	Snatch (kg)				Clean & Jerk (kg)				Total
Rank	Athlete	Group	Body weight	1	2	3	Rank	1	2	3	Rank	Total
1st place, gold medalist(s)	Ilya Ilyin (KAZ)	A	93.78	175	181	~~184~~	5	221	226	—	1st place, gold medalist(s)	407
2nd place, silver medalist(s)	Artem Ivanov (UKR)	A	93.94	181	~~186~~	186	2nd place, silver medalist(s)	216	221	~~227~~	4	407
3rd place, bronze medalist(s)	Saeid Mohammadpour (IRI)	A	93.46	173	179	181	4	216	~~221~~	221	3rd place, bronze medalist(s)	402
4	Aleksandr Ivanov (RUS)	A	92.36	178	183	186	1st place, gold medalist(s)	215	~~220~~	~~221~~	8	401
5	Ruslan Nurudinov (UZB)	A	93.25	~~177~~	177	~~180~~	8	214	221	~~225~~	2nd place, silver medalist(s)	398
6	Andrey Demanov (RUS)	A	93.98	172	176	178	6	213	220	~~225~~	6	398
7	Kim Min-jae (KOR)	A	93.82	177	182	~~187~~	3rd place, bronze medalist(s)	205	214	~~218~~	10	396
8	Anatolie Cîrîcu (MDA)	A	93.54	~~175~~	~~175~~	175	9	215	220	~~225~~	5	395
9	Intigam Zairov (AZE)	B	92.58	177	~~182~~	~~182~~	7	210	215	~~221~~	9	392
10	Aurimas Didžbalis (LTU)	A	93.06	173	~~179~~	~~179~~	11	205	216	~~222~~	7	389
11	Kostyantyn Piliyev (UKR)	B	93.80	162	167	170	15	205	211	~~214~~	11	381
12	Arsen Kasabijew (POL)	B	93.57	166	170	~~174~~	13	~~210~~	210	~~213~~	12	380
13	Aliaksandr Makaranka (BLR)	B	93.68	165	170	~~174~~	14	196	200	208	13	378
14	Asghar Ebrahimi (IRI)	B	93.56	175	~~180~~	~~181~~	10	201	~~208~~	~~208~~	17	376
15	David Matam (FRA)	B	93.36	160	165	170	12	197	202	~~210~~	15	372
16	İbrahim Arat (TUR)	B	93.45	165	~~170~~	~~170~~	17	200	206	~~211~~	14	371
17	Sylwester Kołecki (POL)	B	93.85	164	169	~~172~~	16	202	~~207~~	~~208~~	16	371
18	David Kavelasvili (GRE)	B	93.98	160	165	~~171~~	19	~~200~~	~~200~~	200	19	365
19	José Juan Navarro (ESP)	C	93.40	155	162	~~167~~	21	195	200	~~205~~	18	362
20	Endri Karina (ALB)	C	93.91	155	160	~~165~~	23	~~195~~	~~195~~	195	24	355
21	Herbys Márquez (VEN)	C	92.95	150	155	157	25	191	196	~~199~~	21	353
22	Jasurbek Jumaýew (TKM)	C	93.06	155	163	~~167~~	20	188	~~195~~	~~202~~	27	351
23	Giyosiddin Ahmedov (UZB)	C	93.31	150	~~154~~	154	26	193	197	~~201~~	20	351
24	Christos Saltsidis (GRE)	C	93.78	~~155~~	155	160	22	~~186~~	~~186~~	186	28	346
25	Benedict Uloko (NGR)	D	93.03	147	~~153~~	~~153~~	31	190	~~196~~	196	22	343
26	Simplice Ribouem (AUS)	D	90.55	~~150~~	~~150~~	150	28	~~190~~	~~190~~	190	25	340
27	Yuki Hiraoka (JPN)	C	93.70	~~150~~	150	~~157~~	29	175	185	190	26	340
28	David Katoatau (KIR)	D	93.17	135	140	143	33	187	192	195	23	338
29	Jared Fleming (USA)	C	93.53	~~152~~	~~152~~	152	27	183	~~188~~	~~188~~	31	335
30	Chandrakant Mali (IND)	D	90.77	139	144	148	30	176	~~182~~	~~182~~	33	323
31	Nick Roberts (CAN)	D	93.79	143	~~147~~	~~147~~	34	170	180	~~185~~	32	323
32	Roberto Rosado (PUR)	D	92.45	~~135~~	135	~~140~~	36	180	185	~~190~~	29	320
33	Hernán Viera (PER)	D	93.00	105	110	120	37	145	~~160~~	160	34	280
—	Valeriu Calancea (ROU)	A	93.80	~~165~~	165	~~171~~	18	~~212~~	~~212~~	~~212~~	—	—
—	Eduardo Guadamud (ECU)	C	94.00	155	158	~~160~~	24	~~195~~	~~195~~	~~195~~	—	—
—	Miika Antti-Roiko (FIN)	C	93.99	143	146	~~147~~	32	~~187~~	~~187~~	~~187~~	—	—
—	Faavae Faauliuli (SAM)	D	93.63	139	~~142~~	~~142~~	35	~~188~~	~~188~~	~~188~~	—	—
—	Douglas Santos (BRA)	D	92.77	~~138~~	~~138~~	~~140~~	—	176	185	~~191~~	30	—
—	Eugen Bratan (MDA)	B	93.99	~~173~~	~~173~~	~~173~~	—	—	—	—	—	—
—	Almas Uteshov (KAZ)	A	93.80	~~170~~	~~170~~	~~170~~	—	—	—	—	—	—
—	Javier Vanega (CUB)	B	92.30	~~170~~	~~170~~	~~170~~	—	—	—	—	—	—
