= Weightlifting at the 2012 Summer Olympics – Men's 94 kg =

Men's 94 kg at the Games of the XXX Olympiad
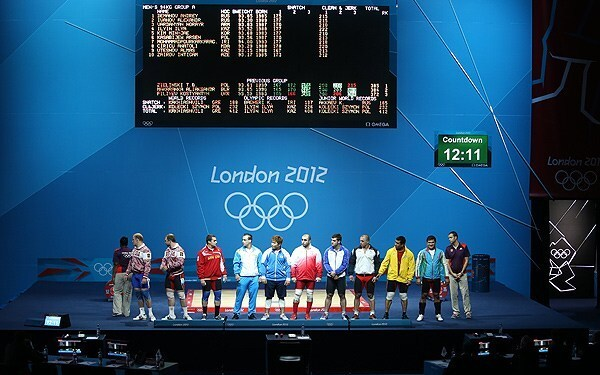
- Venue: ExCeL London
- Date: 4 August 2012
- Competitors: 21 from 18 nations

Medalists
1st place, gold medalist(s)		Saeid Mohammadpour	Iran
2nd place, silver medalist(s)		Kim Min-jae	South Korea
3rd place, bronze medalist(s)		Tomasz Zieliński	Poland

The men's 94 kilograms weightlifting event at the 2012 Summer Olympics in London, United Kingdom, took place at ExCeL London.

== Summary ==
Total score was the sum of the lifter's best result in each of the snatch and the clean and jerk, with three lifts allowed for each lift. In case of a tie, the lighter lifter won; if still tied, the lifter who took the fewest attempts to achieve the total score won. Lifters without a valid snatch score did not perform the clean and jerk.

Artem Ivanov of Ukraine was on the start list, but he was disqualified after weighing in 500 grams overweight.

Arsen Kasabijew of Poland (who had competed for Georgia as Arsen Karabiev in Beijing) was forced to retire from the competition after injuring his arm and knee during his second attempt to snatch 174 kg.

Originally, Kazakhstan's Ilya Ilyin won the competition and broke the world record in the clean and jerk (with a lift of 233 kg), and well as the world record for the total (418 kg), but both records were later annulled for drug use.

The results of this event were significantly altered following the 2016 retesting of the original in-competition samples for banned substances.

Six of the top seven finishers, including the three original medalists, were disqualified after their 2012 samples were retested and found to be positive for the presence of performance-enhancing drugs. Thus, Saeid Mohammadpour of Iran, who had originally finished fifth, was declared the 2012 Olympic champion.

On 6 October 2016, the IWF reported that as a consequence of the IOC's reanalyses of samples from the 2012 Olympic Games, a sample from Norayr Vardanyan of Armenia, who had originally finished 11th, had returned a positive result. In line with the relevant rules and regulations, the IWF imposed mandatory provisional suspensions upon Vardanyan, who was later disqualified. Subsequently, Endri Karina of Albania, who had originally finished 14th, was disqualified after he also tested positive.

At the Olympics in Rio, Zieliński tested positive for spironolactone and was sent home from the games. Since then, he was later upgraded to the bronze medal position from the London games.

== Schedule ==
All times are British Summer Time (UTC+01:00)

Date	Time	Event
4 August 2012	15:30	Group B
4 August 2012	19:00	Group A

== Records ==
Prior to this competition, the existing world and Olympic records were as follows.

World Record	Snatch	Akakios Kakiasvilis (GRE)	188 kg	Athens, Greece	27 November 1999
World Record	Clean & Jerk	Szymon Kołecki (POL)	232 kg	Sofia, Bulgaria	29 April 2000
World Record	Total	Akakios Kakiasvilis (GRE)	412 kg	Athens, Greece	27 November 1999
Olympic Record	Snatch	Kourosh Bagheri (IRI)	187 kg	Sydney, Australia	24 September 2000
Olympic Record	Clean & Jerk	Szymon Kołecki (POL)	224 kg	Beijing, China	17 August 2008
Olympic Record	Total	Milen Dobrev (BUL)	407 kg	Athens, Greece	23 August 2004

== Results ==
Rank	Athlete	Group	Body weight	Snatch (kg)				Clean & Jerk (kg)				Total
Rank	Athlete	Group	Body weight	1	2	3	Result	1	2	3	Result	Total
1st place, gold medalist(s)	Saeid Mohammadpour (IRI)	A	94.00	177	180	183	183	219	~~224~~	~~226~~	219	402
2nd place, silver medalist(s)	Kim Min-jae (KOR)	A	93.68	178	182	185	185	210	~~220~~	~~221~~	210	395
3rd place, bronze medalist(s)	Tomasz Zieliński (POL)	B	93.61	167	172	175	175	208	210	~~215~~	210	385
4	Aliaksandr Makaranka (BLR)	B	93.65	165	170	175	175	200	205	209	209	384
5	Kostyantyn Piliyev (UKR)	B	93.59	160	~~166~~	166	166	200	~~206~~	206	206	372
6	David Kavelasvili (GRE)	B	93.21	165	170	~~173~~	170	200	~~205~~	~~205~~	200	370
7	Abbas Al-Qaisoum (KSA)	B	93.06	140	150	155	155	171	180	~~185~~	180	335
8	Peter Kirkbride (GBR)	B	93.37	138	~~142~~	~~142~~	138	180	185	190	190	328
9	David Katoatau (KIR)	B	93.32	135	~~140~~	140	140	185	~~190~~	~~190~~	185	325
10	Cristopher Pavón (HON)	B	93.20	130	135	140	140	170	177	180	180	320
11	Miika Antti-Roiko (FIN)	B	93.63	~~140~~	~~140~~	140	140	~~180~~	180	~~185~~	180	320
12	Jean Greeff (RSA)	B	93.32	130	137	~~141~~	137	170	~~175~~	176	176	313
—	Arsen Kasabijew (POL)	A	93.56	170	~~174~~	~~174~~	170	—	—	—	—	—
DQ	Ilya Ilyin (KAZ)	A	93.52	177	182	185	185	224	228	233	233	~~418~~
DQ	Aleksandr Ivanov (RUS)	A	93.30	180	~~185~~	185	185	215	224	~~229~~	224	~~409~~
DQ	Anatolie Cîrîcu (MDA)	A	93.29	178	~~181~~	181	181	220	226	~~228~~	226	~~407~~
DQ	Andrey Demanov (RUS)	A	93.85	175	180	182	182	215	~~225~~	225	225	~~407~~
DQ	Intigam Zairov (AZE)	A	93.17	~~175~~	175	182	182	215	~~223~~	~~225~~	215	~~397~~
DQ	Almas Uteshov (KAZ)	A	93.15	167	~~173~~	175	175	213	220	~~225~~	220	~~395~~
DQ	Norayr Vardanyan (ARM)	A	93.83	170	~~175~~	~~175~~	170	210	~~216~~	~~216~~	210	~~380~~
DQ	Endri Karina (ALB)	B	93.90	~~155~~	155	~~161~~	155	185	190	195	195	~~350~~

== New records ==
Clean & Jerk	~~228 kg~~	~~Ilya Ilyin (KAZ)~~	~~OR~~
Clean & Jerk	~~233 kg~~	~~Ilya Ilyin (KAZ)~~	~~WR~~
Total	~~413 kg~~	~~Ilya Ilyin (KAZ)~~	~~WR~~
Total	~~418 kg~~	~~Ilya Ilyin (KAZ)~~	~~WR~~
