= Artem Ivanov =

Artem Ivanov or Artyom Ivanov may refer to:

- Artem Ivanov (draughts player) (born 1988), Ukrainian draughts player
- Artem Ivanov (weightlifter) (born 1987), Ukrainian weightlifter
