= Weightlifting at the 2010 Asian Games – Men's 77 kg =

Men's 77 kg at the 2010 Asian Games
- Venue: Dongguan Arena
- Date: 16 November 2010
- Competitors: 13 from 12 nations

Medalists
gold medal	Pang Kum-chol	North Korea
silver medal	Kirill Pavlov	Kazakhstan
bronze medal	Dauren Shauyeteyev	Kazakhstan

The men's 77 kilograms event at the 2010 Asian Games took place on 16 November 2010 at Dongguan Arena.

== Schedule ==
All times are China Standard Time (UTC+08:00)

Date	Time	Event
Tuesday, 16 November 2010	12:30	Group B
Tuesday, 16 November 2010	16:30	Group A

== Records ==
Prior to this competition, the existing world, Asian and Games records were as follows.

World Record	Snatch	Lü Xiaojun (CHN)	174 kg	Goyang, South Korea	24 November 2009
World Record	Clean & Jerk	Oleg Perepetchenov (RUS)	210 kg	Trenčín, Slovakia	27 April 2001
World Record	Total	Lü Xiaojun (CHN)	378 kg	Goyang, South Korea	24 November 2009
Asian Record	Snatch	Lü Xiaojun (CHN)	174 kg	Goyang, South Korea	24 November 2009
Asian Record	Clean & Jerk	Mohammad Ali Falahatinejad (IRI)	208 kg	Qinhuangdao, China	12 September 2003
Asian Record	Total	Lü Xiaojun (CHN)	378 kg	Goyang, South Korea	24 November 2009
Games Record	Snatch	Sergey Filimonov (KAZ)	173 kg	Busan, South Korea	4 October 2002
Games Record	Clean & Jerk	Mohammad Hossein Barkhah (IRI)	202 kg	Busan, South Korea	4 October 2002
Games Record	Total	Sergey Filimonov (KAZ)	375 kg	Busan, South Korea	4 October 2002

== Results ==
Legend

- NM — No mark

Rank	Athlete	Group	Body weight	Snatch (kg)				Clean & Jerk (kg)				Total
Rank	Athlete	Group	Body weight	1	2	3	Result	1	2	3	Result	Total
1st place, gold medalist(s)	Pang Kum-chol (PRK)	A	76.77	150	156	~~159~~	156	185	192	—	192	348
2nd place, silver medalist(s)	Kirill Pavlov (KAZ)	A	75.18	140	145	147	147	170	175	178	178	325
3rd place, bronze medalist(s)	Dauren Shauyeteyev (KAZ)	A	75.77	140	~~145~~	~~147~~	140	170	~~186~~	~~186~~	170	310
4	Jasurbek Jumaýew (TKM)	A	76.72	137	~~141~~	~~147~~	137	159	~~167~~	~~174~~	159	296
5	Ekkachai Yeeram (THA)	B	76.85	122	127	131	131	155	160	165	165	296
6	Sudhir Kumar Chitradurga (IND)	B	76.74	127	131	135	135	155	160	~~165~~	160	295
7	Khalil Al-Hamqan (KSA)	B	76.52	123	~~128~~	~~128~~	123	147	~~151~~	~~154~~	147	270
8	Husain Al-Hamad (IOC)	B	76.60	110	~~124~~	~~124~~	110	130	—	—	130	240
9	Essa Saleh Al-Roumi (QAT)	B	74.52	65	71	76	76	80	85	90	90	166
10	Jacinto Barros (TLS)	B	70.67	60	70	~~75~~	70	80	90	~~95~~	90	160
—	Suchat Somboon (THA)	A	76.45	~~130~~	~~130~~	130	130	~~166~~	~~166~~	~~166~~	—	NM
—	Su Dajin (CHN)	A	76.77	~~158~~	158	~~161~~	158	~~190~~	~~190~~	~~190~~	—	NM
—	Dương Thanh Trúc (VIE)	A	76.23	~~125~~	~~125~~	~~125~~	—	—	—	—	—	NM
