= Weightlifting at the 2012 Summer Olympics – Men's 77 kg =

Men's 77 kg at the Games of the XXX Olympiad
- Venue: ExCeL London
- Date: 1 August 2012
- Competitors: 12 from 11 nations

Medalists
1st place, gold medalist(s)		Lü Xiaojun	China
2nd place, silver medalist(s)		Lu Haojie	China
3rd place, bronze medalist(s)		Iván Cambar	Cuba

The Men's 77 kilograms weightlifting event at the 2012 Summer Olympics in London, United Kingdom, took place at ExCeL London.

== Summary ==
Total score was the sum of the lifter's best result in each of the snatch and the clean and jerk, with three lifts allowed for each lift. In case of a tie, the lighter lifter won; if still tied, the lifter who took the fewest attempts to achieve the total score won. Lifters without a valid snatch score did not perform the clean and jerk.

China's Lü Xiaojun set two world records with a lift of 175 kilograms in the snatch and a total weight of 379 kilograms. Lü Xiaojun planned to attempt 177 kg in the snatch after he made the 175 kg world record lift, but was not given a chance to perform his third attempt due to a timing miscommunication between the officials and coaches. China's Lu Haojie posted 170 kg in the snatch, and went on to lift 190 kg in the clean and jerk despite an elbow injury.

South Korea's Sa Jae-hyouk was forced to retire from the competition after he dislocated his elbow during his second snatch attempt.

Two lifters who were on the start list did not compete: Armenia's Tigran Martirosyan was forced to scratch from the competition due to a back injury during the warm-up, while Albania's Hysen Pulaku was ejected from the Games after he tested positive for stanozolol.

== Schedule ==
All times are British Summer Time (UTC+01:00)

Date	Time	Event
1 August 2012	10:00	Group B
1 August 2012	19:00	Group A

== Records ==
Prior to this competition, the existing world and Olympic records were as follows.

World Record	Snatch	Lü Xiaojun (CHN)	174 kg	Goyang, South Korea	24 November 2009
World Record	Clean & Jerk	Oleg Perepetchenov (RUS)	210 kg	Trenčín, Slovakia	27 April 2001
World Record	Total	Lü Xiaojun (CHN)	378 kg	Goyang, South Korea	24 November 2009
Olympic Record	Snatch	Taner Sağır (TUR)	172 kg	Athens, Greece	19 August 2004
Olympic Record	Clean & Jerk	Zhan Xugang (CHN)	207 kg	Sydney, Australia	22 September 2000
Olympic Record	Total	Taner Sağır (TUR)	375 kg	Athens, Greece	19 August 2004

== Results ==
Rank	Athlete	Group	Body weight	Snatch (kg)				Clean & Jerk (kg)				Total
Rank	Athlete	Group	Body weight	1	2	3	Result	1	2	3	Result	Total
1st place, gold medalist(s)	Lü Xiaojun (CHN)	A	76.62	170	175	~~177~~	175	195	~~204~~	204	204	379
2nd place, silver medalist(s)	Lu Haojie (CHN)	A	76.37	170	~~175~~	—	170	190	~~191~~	—	190	360
3rd place, bronze medalist(s)	Iván Cambar (CUB)	A	76.70	150	155	~~160~~	155	190	194	—	194	349
4	Chatuphum Chinnawong (THA)	A	76.64	157	~~161~~	~~162~~	157	191	~~195~~	~~195~~	191	348
5	Ibrahim Ramadan (EGY)	A	76.79	150	~~155~~	155	155	~~192~~	192	~~197~~	192	347
6	Andrés Mata (ESP)	B	76.93	145	150	~~153~~	150	183	188	~~190~~	188	338
7	Krzysztof Zwarycz (POL)	A	76.97	150	~~153~~	~~154~~	150	~~182~~	182	~~189~~	182	332
8	Felix Ekpo (NGR)	B	76.23	146	~~151~~	151	151	180	~~188~~	~~188~~	180	331
9	Kirill Pavlov (KAZ)	B	76.77	138	143	147	147	165	~~175~~	175	175	322
10	Jack Oliver (GBR)	B	76.45	~~135~~	135	140	140	160	165	170	170	310
11	Toafitu Perive (SAM)	B	75.95	117	122	~~125~~	122	157	163	167	167	289
—	Sa Jae-hyouk (KOR)	A	76.56	158	~~162~~	—	158	—	—	—	—	—

== New records ==
Snatch	175 kg	Lü Xiaojun (CHN)	WR
Total	379 kg	Lü Xiaojun (CHN)	WR
