= Amanatidis (name) =

Amanatidis is a surname in Greece. People with the surname include:

- Ioannis Amanatidis
- Georgios Amanatidis
- Nathan Amanatidis
- Periklis Amanatidis
- Ioannis Amanatidis (politician)
- Alexis Amanatidis
- Alexandros Amanatidis
