= Weightlifting at the 2014 Commonwealth Games – Men's 94 kg =

Weightlifting – Men's 94 kg at the 2014 Commonwealth Games
- Venue: Clyde Auditorium
- Dates: 29 July 2014
- Competitors: 14 from 13 nations
- Winning total weight: 349kg

Medalists
gold medal	Steven Kari	Papua New Guinea
silver medal	Simplice Ribouem	Australia
bronze medal	Chandrakant Dadu Mali	India

The Men's 94 kg weightlifting event at the 2014 Commonwealth Games in Glasgow, Scotland, took place at Scottish Exhibition and Conference Centre on 29 July. The contest was won by Steven Kari, who lifted a combined weight of 349 kg. The silver medal was won by Simplice Ribouem and the bronze by Chandrakant Mali.

== Result ==
Rank	Athlete	Snatch (kg)				Clean & Jerk (kg)				Total
Rank	Athlete	1	2	3	Result	1	2	3	Result	Total
1st place, gold medalist(s)	Steven Kari (PNG)	147	~~149~~	149	149	~~195~~	195	200	200	349
2nd place, silver medalist(s)	Simplice Ribouem (AUS)	147	~~152~~	153	153	188	196	~~201~~	196	349
3rd place, bronze medalist(s)	Chandrakant Dadu Mali (IND)	146	150	~~153~~	150	183	188	~~194~~	188	338
4	Owen Boxall (ENG)	~~144~~	144	150	150	176	181	~~185~~	181	331
5	Sonny Webster (ENG)	143	~~147~~	147	147	180	~~186~~	~~186~~	180	327
6	David Samayoa (CAN)	140	145	~~147~~	145	170	176	~~182~~	176	321
7	Petit Minkoumba (CMR)	130	137	143	143	170	177	~~180~~	177	320
8	Mohd Faiz Musa (MAS)	~~138~~	~~138~~	138	138	172	~~177~~	~~177~~	172	310
9	Sanele Mao (SAM)	125	130	135	135	170	~~177~~	~~180~~	170	305
10	Shanaka Peters (SRI)	125	~~130~~	~~130~~	125	~~170~~	170	~~175~~	170	295
11	Nii Larkyne (GHA)	101	104	107	107	138	~~143~~	~~143~~	138	245
12	Michael Francois (TCI)	70	75	~~90~~	75	100	105	~~110~~	105	180
-	Olusola Friday (NGR)	~~145~~	145	150	150	~~165~~	~~165~~	~~165~~	-	DNF
-	Peter Kirkbride (SCO)	142	~~145~~	~~145~~	142	~~182~~	~~182~~	~~182~~	-	DNF
