= Weightlifting at the 2010 Commonwealth Games – Men's 77 kg =

The Men's 77 kg weightlifting competition took place on 7 October. The weightlifter from Nauru won the gold, with a combined lift of 333 kg.

== Results ==
Rank	Name	Country	B.weight (kg)	Snatch (kg)	Clean & Jerk (kg)	Total (kg)
1st place, gold medalist(s)	Yukio Peter	Nauru	76.61	148	185	333
2nd place, silver medalist(s)	Ben Turner	Australia	76.39	133	175	308
3rd place, bronze medalist(s)	Sudhir Raju	India	76.93	131	166	297
4	Steven Kari	Papua New Guinea	75.80	128	165	293
5	Alexandros Amanatides	Cyprus	76.37	132	157	289
6	Petit Minkoumba	Cameroon	76.22	125	150	275
7	Manoranjan Roy	Bangladesh	76.79	125	148	273
8	Jack Oliver	England	75.94	121	148	269
9	Graeme Kane	Scotland	76.66	118	143	261
10	Kalidi Batuusa	Uganda	76.94	115	145	255
11	Charles Simeon	Seychelles	76.98	110	145	255
–	William Vasiliades	Cyprus	75.08	–	–	DNS
–	Zulkifli Che Rose	Malaysia	76.46	–	–	DNF
–	Felix Ekpo	Nigeria	76.12	148	–	DNF
–	Taubena Tatonga	Kiribati	76.46	–	–	DNF

== See also ==
- 2010 Commonwealth Games
- Weightlifting at the 2010 Commonwealth Games
