= 2009 World Weightlifting Championships – Men's 77 kg =

Men's weightlifting competition

The men's competition in the middleweight (– 77 kg) division was staged on November 24, 2009.

== Schedule ==
Date	Time	Event
24 November 2009	13:00	Group C
24 November 2009	16:00	Group B
24 November 2009	19:00	Group A

== Medalists ==
Event	Gold		Silver		Bronze	
Snatch	Lü Xiaojun (CHN)	174 kg	Tigran Martirosyan (ARM)	170 kg	Su Dajin (CHN)	165 kg
Clean & Jerk	Sa Jae-hyouk (KOR)	205 kg	Lü Xiaojun (CHN)	204 kg	Su Dajin (CHN)	200 kg
Total	Lü Xiaojun (CHN)	378 kg	Tigran Martirosyan (ARM)	370 kg	Su Dajin (CHN)	365 kg

== Records ==
Prior to this competition, the existing world records were as follows.

World record	Snatch	Sergey Filimonov (KAZ)	173 kg	Almaty, Kazakhstan	9 April 2004
World record	Clean & jerk	Oleg Perepetchenov (RUS)	210 kg	Trenčín, Slovakia	27 April 2001
World record	Total	Plamen Zhelyazkov (BUL)	377 kg	Doha, Qatar	27 March 2002

== Results ==
Rank	Athlete	Group	Body weight	Snatch (kg)				Clean & Jerk (kg)				Total
Rank	Athlete	Group	Body weight	1	2	3	Rank	1	2	3	Rank	Total
1st place, gold medalist(s)	Lü Xiaojun (CHN)	A	76.35	165	170	174	1st place, gold medalist(s)	200	204	~~211~~	2nd place, silver medalist(s)	378
2nd place, silver medalist(s)	Tigran Martirosyan (ARM)	A	76.44	165	~~170~~	170	2nd place, silver medalist(s)	~~200~~	200	~~205~~	4	370
3rd place, bronze medalist(s)	Su Dajin (CHN)	A	76.34	160	~~165~~	165	3rd place, bronze medalist(s)	200	~~205~~	~~205~~	3rd place, bronze medalist(s)	365
4	Sa Jae-hyouk (KOR)	A	76.54	160	~~165~~	~~165~~	5	205	~~212~~	~~212~~	1st place, gold medalist(s)	365
5	Iván Cambar (CUB)	A	76.30	153	158	160	4	192	~~196~~	196	6	356
6	Tarek Yehia (EGY)	A	76.75	~~155~~	~~155~~	156	8	192	~~196~~	197	5	353
7	Erkand Qerimaj (ALB)	A	76.63	~~153~~	153	156	7	187	~~192~~	193	8	349
8	Kim Kwang-hoon (KOR)	A	76.49	~~153~~	153	~~158~~	12	~~193~~	193	~~201~~	7	346
9	Mikalai Charniak (BLR)	A	76.94	155	160	~~162~~	6	182	185	~~189~~	14	345
10	Yukio Peter (NRU)	B	76.71	144	149	154	11	181	190	~~196~~	10	344
11	Vladislav Lukanin (RUS)	B	76.42	~~150~~	150	155	9	183	188	~~190~~	12	343
12	Ramzi Bahloul (TUN)	B	76.76	146	~~153~~	153	13	186	190	~~193~~	11	343
13	Armen Ghazaryan (RUS)	B	76.15	145	150	~~153~~	16	180	185	~~190~~	13	335
14	Krzysztof Szramiak (POL)	A	76.84	155	~~159~~	~~159~~	10	180	~~185~~	~~185~~	18	335
15	Namig Jamilov (AZE)	B	76.85	145	150	~~153~~	17	181	~~186~~	~~186~~	16	331
16	Semih Yağcı (TUR)	B	76.94	148	151	~~153~~	14	175	180	~~185~~	19	331
17	Yoshito Shintani (JPN)	B	75.86	140	~~145~~	145	18	180	~~184~~	184	15	329
18	Giorgio De Luca (ITA)	B	73.84	141	146	150	15	171	~~176~~	176	20	326
19	Iurii Chykyda (UKR)	B	76.76	145	~~151~~	~~151~~	20	175	~~180~~	180	17	325
20	Safaa Rashed (IRQ)	C	75.50	130	137	140	21	175	~~185~~	~~185~~	21	315
21	Samet Keleş (TUR)	C	76.66	145	~~150~~	~~150~~	19	160	165	170	22	315
22	Sitthisak Suphalak (THA)	C	76.94	~~132~~	132	138	22	158	162	166	25	304
23	Enrico Cangemi (ITA)	C	76.34	135	~~140~~	~~140~~	24	~~165~~	~~165~~	166	24	301
24	Aman Meredow (TKM)	C	76.71	~~130~~	130	136	23	150	156	~~161~~	26	292
25	Petit Minkoumba (CMR)	C	76.43	125	~~130~~	~~130~~	26	155	~~160~~	~~161~~	27	280
26	Ian Critchlow (WAL)	C	72.75	83	87	~~92~~	27	107	112	~~115~~	28	199
—	Ensar Musić (CRO)	B	76.64	~~135~~	~~135~~	135	25	~~175~~	~~175~~	~~175~~	—	—
—	Ibrahim Ramadan (EGY)	A	76.39	~~152~~	~~153~~	~~153~~	—	~~190~~	190	~~195~~	9	—
—	Jasurbek Jumaýew (TKM)	B	76.88	~~145~~	~~145~~	~~145~~	—	160	170	~~175~~	23	—
DQ	Johan Nyström (FIN)	C	76.72	~~130~~	~~130~~	130	—	165	~~172~~	172	—	—
DQ	Hosni Daher (PLE)	C	76.12	85	~~90~~	93	—	105	~~110~~	~~110~~	—	—

== New records ==
Snatch	174 kg	Lü Xiaojun (CHN)	WR
Total	378 kg	Lü Xiaojun (CHN)	WR
