= Weightlifting at the 2010 Commonwealth Games – Men's 85 kg =

The Men's 85 kg weightlifting event took place on 8 October. The gold medal winner from Australia had represented Cameroon at the 2006 Commonwealth Games.

== Results ==
Rank	Name	Country	Group	B.weight (kg)	Snatch (kg)	Clean & Jerk (kg)	Total (kg)
1st place, gold medalist(s)	Simplice Ribouem	Australia	A	84.69	150	183	333
2nd place, silver medalist(s)	Richie Patterson	New Zealand	A	84.13	150	181	331
3rd place, bronze medalist(s)	Mathieu Marineau	Canada	A	84.46	145	180	325
4	Chandrakant Mali	India	A	84.87	145	180	325
5	Paul Dumais	Canada	A	84.31	145	170	315
6	Abd Rahim	Malaysia	A	82.50	140	173	313
7	Khurram Shahzad	Pakistan	A	84.19	140	166	306
8	Terence Dixie	Seychelles	A	84.56	130	150	280
9	R. Ranathunga	Sri Lanka	A	84.88	120	155	275
10	Duke Machaka	Kenya	B	83.20	115	150	265
11	Val-John Starr	Nauru	A	84.08	115	150	265
12	Godfrey Baligeya	Uganda	B	84.12	115	145	260
13	Petunu Opeloge	Samoa	A	84.39	115	140	255
14	Linda Matsebula	Swaziland	B	84.20	105	147	252
15	Beru Karianako	Kiribati	B	84.32	112	140	252
16	Abdullah Al Mumin	Bangladesh	B	84.89	110	140	250
17	Mohamed Kamara	Sierra Leone	B	83.25	110	135	245
18	Pala Molisa	Vanuatu	B	83.85	107	130	237
19	Joe Aboagye	Ghana	B	83.13	100	135	235
20	Michael Francois	Turks and Caicos Islands	B	84.90	70	95	165

== See also ==
- 2010 Commonwealth Games
- Weightlifting at the 2010 Commonwealth Games
