= Cheongju Sa clan =

Korean clan from Shandong, China

- Country: Korea
- Current region: Shandong
- Founder: Sa Yo
- Connected members: Sa Jae-hyouk

Cheongju Sa clan (Korean: 청주 사씨; Hanja: 靑州 史氏) was one of the Korean clans. Their Bon-gwan was in Qingzhou, Shandong, China, known as Cheongju in Korean (Korean: 청주; Hanja: 青州). According to the research in 2000, the number of Cheongju Sa clan was 7486. Their founder was Sa Yo who was from Shandong and was a Gongsin (Hanja: 功臣) in Ming dynasty. He exiled himself to Goryeo in 1372 with his eldest brother Sa Jung because he was suspected that he could assist Ming Yuzhen’s rebellion.

== See also ==
- Korean clan names of foreign origin
