= 2014 World Weightlifting Championships – Men's 77 kg =

The men's 77 kilograms event at the 2014 World Weightlifting Championships was held on 11 and 12 November 2014 in Baluan Sholak Sports Palace, Almaty, Kazakhstan.

Daniel Godelli was the original gold medalist with a total of 369 kg, but was later disqualified due to one of his samples testing positive for the use of the steroid Stanozolol.

== Schedule ==
Date	Time	Event
11 November 2014	10:00	Group D
11 November 2014	12:00	Group C
11 November 2014	14:00	Group B
12 November 2014	19:00	Group A

== Medalists ==
Event	Gold		Silver		Bronze	
Snatch	Zhong Guoshun (CHN)	171 kg	Kim Kwang-song (PRK)	163 kg	Petr Asayonak (BLR)	159 kg
Clean & Jerk	Kim Kwang-song (PRK)	200 kg	Zhong Guoshun (CHN)	196 kg	Kirill Pavlov (KAZ)	195 kg
Total	Zhong Guoshun (CHN)	367 kg	Kim Kwang-song (PRK)	363 kg	Kirill Pavlov (KAZ)	352 kg

== Records ==
Prior to this competition, the existing world records were as follows.

World record	Snatch	Lü Xiaojun (CHN)	176 kg	Wrocław, Poland	24 October 2013
World record	Clean & Jerk	Oleg Perepetchenov (RUS)	210 kg	Trenčín, Slovakia	27 April 2001
World record	Total	Lü Xiaojun (CHN)	380 kg	Wrocław, Poland	24 October 2013

== Results ==
Rank	Athlete	Group	Body weight	Snatch (kg)				Clean & Jerk (kg)				Total
Rank	Athlete	Group	Body weight	1	2	3	Rank	1	2	3	Rank	Total
1st place, gold medalist(s)	Zhong Guoshun (CHN)	A	76.50	166	171	~~172~~	1st place, gold medalist(s)	~~196~~	196	~~201~~	2nd place, silver medalist(s)	367
2nd place, silver medalist(s)	Kim Kwang-song (PRK)	A	76.35	~~162~~	163	~~168~~	2nd place, silver medalist(s)	190	195	200	1st place, gold medalist(s)	363
3rd place, bronze medalist(s)	Kirill Pavlov (KAZ)	A	76.18	150	155	157	5	181	190	195	3rd place, bronze medalist(s)	352
4	Petr Asayonak (BLR)	A	76.60	154	159	~~164~~	3rd place, bronze medalist(s)	189	~~195~~	~~195~~	5	348
5	Choe Jon-wi (PRK)	A	76.34	150	~~155~~	155	6	185	189	~~193~~	4	344
6	Ibrahim Ramadan (EGY)	A	76.70	148	~~153~~	153	8	188	~~196~~	~~196~~	6	341
7	Artiom Pipa (MDA)	B	76.46	147	151	~~154~~	10	181	186	~~191~~	7	337
8	Maged Emad (EGY)	A	76.67	~~145~~	145	150	15	~~185~~	185	~~190~~	9	335
9	Demir Demirev (BUL)	B	76.82	145	150	~~152~~	17	180	~~185~~	185	10	335
10	Junior Sánchez (VEN)	B	73.58	148	151	154	7	172	180	—	16	334
11	Alejandro González (ESP)	B	76.00	140	150	~~153~~	12	182	~~190~~	~~190~~	12	332
12	Andrés Mata (ESP)	B	76.45	140	150	~~153~~	13	182	~~190~~	~~190~~	13	332
13	Triyatno (INA)	C	75.71	140	~~145~~	147	19	175	180	183	11	330
14	Max Lang (GER)	B	75.94	145	~~150~~	150	11	180	~~185~~	~~185~~	17	330
15	Ara Khachatryan (ARM)	A	76.81	150	~~155~~	~~155~~	16	175	180	~~185~~	19	330
16	Alexandru Roșu (ROU)	B	76.93	~~141~~	141	~~145~~	26	180	~~186~~	186	8	327
17	Addriel La O (CUB)	C	74.02	143	~~148~~	148	18	173	~~178~~	178	21	326
18	Jordanis Espinosa (CUB)	C	76.69	135	140	144	23	175	182	~~188~~	15	326
19	Travis Cooper (USA)	C	76.59	140	~~144~~	145	21	175	179	~~183~~	20	324
20	Hakob Mkrtchyan (ARM)	C	76.75	135	~~140~~	140	30	170	175	180	18	320
21	Jakob Neufeld (GER)	B	76.90	140	~~143~~	143	25	171	175	~~178~~	24	318
22	Sathish Sivalingam (IND)	C	76.75	~~140~~	140	~~145~~	29	168	173	177	22	317
23	Welisson Silva (BRA)	C	76.67	135	~~140~~	140	28	~~175~~	175	~~180~~	23	315
24	Daýanç Aşyrow (TKM)	C	76.86	145	~~149~~	~~149~~	22	168	~~173~~	~~173~~	27	313
25	Nguyễn Hồng Ngọc (VIE)	D	75.81	135	140	~~143~~	27	172	~~182~~	~~182~~	25	312
26	Baýmyrat Orazdurdyýew (TKM)	C	76.78	~~139~~	~~139~~	140	31	170	~~175~~	~~176~~	26	310
27	Emmanouil Marianakis (GRE)	D	76.77	135	141	143	24	~~160~~	160	165	30	308
28	Amir Belhout (ALG)	D	76.37	135	~~140~~	~~140~~	33	165	~~170~~	~~170~~	29	300
29	Tim Kring (DEN)	D	75.73	128	~~132~~	132	34	157	161	165	28	297
30	Ragala Venkat Rahul (IND)	D	76.76	132	~~136~~	136	32	~~161~~	161	~~166~~	31	297
31	Jean-Marc Béland (CAN)	D	76.98	128	132	~~135~~	35	155	~~160~~	160	32	292
—	Erkand Qerimaj (ALB)	A	76.82	156	158	~~160~~	4	~~191~~	~~192~~	~~193~~	—	—
—	Chatuphum Chinnawong (THA)	A	76.66	152	~~158~~	~~158~~	9	~~184~~	~~184~~	~~184~~	—	—
—	James Tatum (USA)	C	76.50	145	150	~~158~~	14	~~175~~	~~175~~	~~175~~	—	—
—	Giorgi Lomtadze (GEO)	B	76.41	147	~~151~~	~~151~~	20	~~175~~	~~175~~	~~175~~	—	—
—	Edinson Angulo (COL)	D	75.92	~~130~~	~~130~~	130	36	~~170~~	~~170~~	~~170~~	—	—
—	Yony Andica (COL)	B	76.66	~~143~~	~~143~~	~~143~~	—	177	182	~~187~~	14	—
—	Hugo Catalán (ARG)	D	76.29	—	—	—	—	—	—	—	—	—
DQ	Daniel Godelli (ALB)	A	76.07	163	167	171	—	195	198	~~211~~	—	—
