= Greeff =

Greeff is a surname. Notable people with the surname include:

- Arno Greeff (born 1995), South African actor
- Carel Greeff (born 1990), South African rugby union player
- Jean Greeff (born 1990), South African weightlifter
- Lloyd Greeff (born 1994), South African rugby union player
- Melissa Greeff (born 1994), South African chess player
- Pikkie Greeff (1968 - 2021), South African military trade union National Secretary
- Richard Greeff (1829-1892), German zoologist
- Stephan Greeff (born 1989), South African rugby union player
- Werner Greeff (born 1977), South African rugby union player
