= Milko Tokola =

Finnish weightlifter

Milko Olavi Tokola
Personal information
- Born: 10 October 1992 (age 34) Rautio, Finland
- Weight: 82.75 kg (182.4 lb)

Sport
- Country: Finland
- Sport: Weightlifting
- Team: National team
- Updated on 4 September 2016

Milko Olavi Tokola (born 10 October 1992) is a Finnish male weightlifter, competing in the 85 kg category and representing Finland at international competitions.

He participated at the 2016 Summer Olympics in the men's 85 kg event finishing 19th. He competed at world championships, most recently at the 2014 World Weightlifting Championships.

== Major results ==
Year	Venue	Weight	Snatch (kg)				Clean & Jerk (kg)				Total	Rank
Year	Venue	Weight	1	2	3	Rank	1	2	3	Rank	Total	Rank
World Championships
2014	Houston, United States	85 kg	130	135	137	42	~~160~~	163	168	42	305	40
2011	Paris, France	77 kg	130	~~134~~	~~135~~	31	156	161	165	27	295	27
