= Kirill Pavlov (weightlifter) =

Kazakhstani weightlifter (born 1986)

Personal information
- Born: September 13, 1986 (age 40)
- Height: 1.73 m (5 ft 8 in)
- Weight: 77 kg (170 lb)

Sport
- Country: Kazakhstan
- Sport: Weightlifting
Medal record
World Championships
| Bronze medal – third place | 2014 Almaty | −77 kg |
Asian Games
| Silver medal – second place | 2010 Guangzhou | 77 kg |

Kirill Pavlov (born 13 September 1986 in Alma-Ata, Kazakh SSR, Soviet Union) is a Kazakhstani weightlifter competing in the 77 kg category. He competed at the 2012 Summer Olympics, finishing 9th. He won the silver medal at the 2010 Asian Games.

He originally finished fourth in the clean and jerk and total at the 2014 World Weightlifting Championships, but gold medalist Daniel Godelli was disqualified after he tested positive for stanozolol use, giving Pavlov two bronze medal performances.

He is notable in weightlifting for his unorthodox clean technique, with a very pronounced hitch at the hips and diving under the bar.

== Major results ==
| Year | Venue | Weight | Snatch (kg) | | | | Clean & Jerk (kg) | | | | Total | Rank |
| Year | Venue | Weight | 1 | 2 | 3 | Rank | 1 | 2 | 3 | Rank | Total | Rank |
Olympic Games
| 2012 | (United Kingdom) London, England | 77 kg | 138 | 143 | 147 | 10 | 165 | ~~175~~ | 175 | 9 | 322 | 9 |
World Championships
| 2011 | Paris, France | 77 kg | 146 | 151 | ~~155~~ | 12 | 177 | 183 | 189 | 7 | 340 | 8 |
| 2014 | Almaty, Kazakhstan | 77 kg | 150 | 155 | 157 | 5 | 181 | 190 | 195 | 3rd place, bronze medalist(s) | 352 | 3rd place, bronze medalist(s) |
Asian Games
| 2010 | Guangzhou, China | 77 kg | 140 | 145 | 147 | 3 | 170 | 175 | 178 | 2nd place, silver medalist(s) | 325 | 2nd place, silver medalist(s) |
