= William Vasiliades =

Cypriot weightlifter (born 1987)

Personal information
- Full name: William Vasiliades
- Born: 22 November 1987 (age 38)
- Weight: 75.08 kg (165.5 lb)

Sport
- Country: Cyprus
- Sport: Weightlifting
- Weight class: 77 kg
- Team: National team
- Updated on 11 October 2016

William Vasiliades (born 22 November 1987) is a Cypriot male weightlifter, competing in the 77 kg category and representing Cyprus at international competitions. He participated at the 2010 Commonwealth Games in the 77 kg event.

== Major competitions ==
Year	Venue	Weight	Snatch (kg)				Clean & Jerk (kg)				Total	Rank
Year	Venue	Weight	1	2	3	Rank	1	2	3	Rank	Total	Rank
Commonwealth Games
2010	Delhi, India	77 kg	---	---	---	—N/a	---	---	---	—N/a	0	---
