= Jean-Marc Béland =

Canadian weightlifter

Jean-Marc Beland
Personal information
- Born: 12 June 1984 (age 41)
- Weight: 76.98 kg (169.7 lb)

Sport
- Country: Canada
- Sport: Weightlifting
- Team: National team
- Updated on 4 September 2016

Jean-Marc Beland (born 12 June 1984) is a Canadian male weightlifter, competing in the 77 kg category and representing Canada at international competitions. He competed at world championships, most recently at the 2014 World Weightlifting Championships.

== Major results ==
Year	Venue	Weight	Snatch (kg)				Clean & Jerk (kg)				Total	Rank
Year	Venue	Weight	1	2	3	Rank	1	2	3	Rank	Total	Rank
World Championships
2014	Houston, United States	77 kg	128	132	~~135~~	35	155	~~160~~	160	32	292	31
2010	Antalya, Turkey	77 kg	125	~~129~~	~~130~~	32	~~150~~	~~150~~	~~150~~	---	0	---
