= Shanaka Peters =

Sri Lankan weightlifter (born 1991)

Personal information
- Full name: Shanaka Madusanka Peters
- Born: 10 October 1991 (age 34)
- Weight: 93.61 kg (206.4 lb)

Sport
- Country: Sri Lanka
- Sport: Weightlifting
- Weight class: 94 kg
- Team: National team
- Updated on 19 October 2016

Shanaka Madusanka Peters (born 10 October 1991) is a Sri Lankan male weightlifter, competing in the 94 kg category and representing Sri Lanka at international competitions. He participated at the 2014 Commonwealth Games in the 94 kg event. He won the silver medal at the 2016 South Asian Games lifting a total of 300 kg.

== Major competitions ==
Year	Venue	Weight	Snatch (kg)				Clean & Jerk (kg)				Total	Rank
Year	Venue	Weight	1	2	3	Rank	1	2	3	Rank	Total	Rank
Commonwealth Games
2014	Glasgow, Scotland	94 kg	125	~~130~~	~~130~~	—N/a	~~170~~	170	~~175~~	—N/a	295	10
