= Nick Roberts (weightlifter) =

Canadian weightlifter

Personal information
- Full name: Nicolas Roberts
- Born: 15 September 1984 (age 41)
- Weight: 93.79 kg (206.8 lb)

Sport
- Country: Canada
- Sport: Weightlifting
- Team: National team
- Updated on 6 September 2016

Nicolas Roberts (born 15 September 1984) is a Canadian male weightlifter, competing in the 94 kg category and representing Canada at international competitions. He competed at world championships, most recently at the 2011 World Weightlifting Championships.

== Major results ==
| Year | Venue | Weight | Snatch (kg) | | | | Clean & Jerk (kg) | | | | Total | Rank |
| Year | Venue | Weight | 1 | 2 | 3 | Rank | 1 | 2 | 3 | Rank | Total | Rank |
World Championships
| 2011 | Paris, France | 94 kg | 143 | ~~147~~ | ~~147~~ | 34 | 170 | 180 | ~~185~~ | 32 | 323 | 31 |
| 2006 | Santo Domingo, Dominican Republic | 94 kg | ~~140~~ | ~~140~~ | ~~140~~ | --- | ~~170~~ | ~~170~~ | 170 | 35 | 0.0 | --- |
Commonwealth Games
| 2010 | Delhi, India | 94 kg | ~~140~~ | 140 | ~~145~~ | —N/a | 176 | ~~181~~ | ~~183~~ | —N/a | 316 | 5 |
