= Halil Zorba =

British weightlifter

Personal information
- Born: 22 September 1988 (age 36); London, England

Sport
- Country: United Kingdom; England
- Sport: Weightlifting
- Event: -77kg division
- Coached by: Keith Morgan
- Updated on 11 July 2012

Halil Zorba (born 22 September 1988) is a British weightlifter. He represented England at the 2010 Commonwealth Games, and was in contention for the British team for the 2012 Summer Olympics but was ultimately not chosen for the team despite being British Champion in his weight class. He competes part-time, continuing with his career as a civil engineer.

== Early life ==
Halil Zorba was born on 22 September 1988, and is of Turkish Cypriot heritage. He attended Bethnal Green Technology College, where he was taught PE by 1964 Olympian George Manners. He took up weightlifting whilst at the college, before going to University, and he receives funding support to compete from the National Lottery.

== Career ==
He broke into the world's top 100 in his weight division, 69 kg, at the age of 19, and was ranked second in the British senior rankings. A back injury saw him miss the 2008 European Championships. He represented England at the 2010 Commonwealth Games in Delhi; competing in the 69 kg category, he managed to come 4th in group B and went on to finish 10th overall out of 18.

At the 2011 World Weightlifting Championships, he lifted 125 kilograms (276 lb) in the snatch, setting a new personal best; however, he suffered an injury to his leg prior to the clean and jerk, resulting in a lift of only 165 kilograms (364 lb). This resulted in the combined weight being less than the minimum standard to be considered for the 2012 Summer Olympics.

Zorba went into the English Championships seeking to make the Olympic qualifying standard. He reached the Olympic B grade, setting a new British record in the clean and jerk of 171 kilograms (377 lb) at the same time. Following the breaking of the record, he twice attempted to lift 175 kilograms (386 lb), but failed on each occasion. His performance made Zorba the second British competitor to meet the Olympic standard after Jack Oliver.

He was named to the British team for the 2012 European Weightlifting Championships. He lifted a combined weight of 285 kilograms (628 lb), finishing in 21st position. He was a candidate for one of the three male weightlifting spots for the host country at the 2012 Olympics, having won the British Championship at the British Olympic trials in addition to achieving the B qualifying standard. However, he was not chosen for the British team, with Oliver, Peter Kirkbride and Gareth Evans chosen instead.

Zorba trains at the Crystal Palace National Sports Centre with coach Keith Morgan. Zorba remains British record holder in several categories, including both the clean and jerk and the snatch in the 69 kg category of the men's under eighteen competition, and the clean and jerk in both the 69 kg and 77 kg categories of the men's under 23 competition.

== Personal life ==
Zorba is related to the former British javelin thrower and multiple medal-winner Fatima Whitbread on his mother's side of the family. He works as a civil engineer full-time having qualified from the University of Brighton, splitting his time between that and his sport.
