= Val-John Starr =

Nauruan weightlifter

Personal information
- Full name: Val-John Star
- Born: 25 June 1989 (age 37)
- Weight: 84.08 kg (185.4 lb)

Sport
- Country: Nauru
- Sport: Weightlifting
- Weight class: 85 kg
- Team: National team
Medal record
Men's Weightlifting
Representing Nauru
Oceania Championships
Gold medal – first place	2010 Suva	85 kg
- Updated on 1 January 2018

Val-John Star (born 25 June 1989) is a Nauruan male weightlifter, competing in the 85 kg category and representing Nauru at international competitions. He won gold medal at 2010 Oceania Weightlifting Championship in Suva at the 85 kg category. He participated at the 2010 Commonwealth Games in the 85 kg event. He won the bronze medal at the 2011 Pacific Games.

== Major competitions ==
Year	Venue	Weight	Snatch (kg)				Clean & Jerk (kg)				Total	Rank
Year	Venue	Weight	1	2	3	Rank	1	2	3	Rank	Total	Rank
Commonwealth Games
2010	Delhi, India	85 kg	115	~~120~~	~~120~~	11	142	150	~~155~~	9	265	11
