= Norayr Vardanyan =

Armenian and American weightlifter (born 1987)

Norik Vardanian (Norayr Vardanyan)
Personal information
- Born: 15 May 1987 (age 39) Leninakan, Armenian SSR, USSR
- Weight: 94 kg (207 lb; 14.8 st)

Sport
- Country: Armenia; USA
- Sport: Weightlifting
Medal record
Men's Weightlifting
Representing United States
Pan American Games
Disqualified	2015 Toronto	94 kg
Pan American Championships
Disqualified	2009 Chicago	94 kg

Norayr (Norik) Vardanyan (Armenian: Նորայր Վարդանյան, born 15 May 1987 in Leninakan, Armenian SSR) is an Armenian and American weightlifter.

Norayr is the son of legendary Soviet weightlifter Yurik Vardanyan (1956-2018).

Vardanian initially won the bronze medal in the 94 kg class at the 2009 Pan American Weightlifting Championships but was later disqualified after testing positive for cannabis.

He competed for Armenia in the 94 kg weight class at the 2012 Summer Olympics where he placed 11th. He was also the silver medalist at the 2015 Pan American Games.

On 6 October 2016, the IWF reported that as a consequence of the IOC's reanalyses of samples from the 2012 Olympic Games, a sample produced by Norayr Vardanyan, who represented Armenia, had returned a positive result. In line with the relevant rules and regulations, the IWF imposed a mandatory provisional suspension upon Vardanyan, who will remain provisionally suspended until his case is closed. On 12 January 2017 it was confirmed that because of a doping violation he had been disqualified from the 2012 Olympic Games.
