= IWF World Weightlifter of the Year =

The IWF World Weightlifter of the Year award is a prize that can be won by weightlifters participating in events within the sport of weightlifting organised by the International Weightlifting Federation (IWF).

== Men ==
Year	Winner	Country	Ref
1982	Blagoy Blagoev	Bulgaria	
1983	Blagoy Blagoev	Bulgaria	
1984	Naim Suleymanov	Bulgaria	
1985	Naum Shalamanov	Bulgaria	
1986	Naum Shalamanov	Bulgaria	
1987	Mikhail Petrov	Bulgaria	
1988	Naim Süleymanoğlu	Turkey	
1989	Ivan Ivanov	Bulgaria	
1990	Ivan Ivanov	Bulgaria	
1991	Chun Byung-kwan	South Korea	
1992	Naim Süleymanoğlu	Turkey	
1993	Nikolay Peshalov	Bulgaria	
1994	Aleksey Petrov	Russia	
1995	Pyrros Dimas	Greece	
1996	Naim Süleymanoğlu	Turkey	
1997	Andrey Chemerkin	Russia	
1998	Plamen Zhelyazkov	Bulgaria	
1999	Halil Mutlu	Turkey	
2000	Hossein Rezazadeh	Iran	
2001	Halil Mutlu	Turkey	
2002	Hossein Rezazadeh	Iran	
2003	Hossein Rezazadeh	Iran	
2004	Hossein Rezazadeh	Iran	
2005	Ilya Ilyin	Kazakhstan	
2006	Ilya Ilyin	Kazakhstan	
2007	Andrei Rybakou	Belarus	
2008	Matthias Steiner	Germany	
2009	Lü Xiaojun	China	
2010	Behdad Salimi	Iran	
2011	Khadzhimurat Akkaev	Russia	
2012	Behdad Salimi	Iran	
2013	Ruslan Albegov	Russia	
2014	Ilya Ilyin	Kazakhstan	
2015	Ilya Ilyin	Kazakhstan	
2016	Kianoush Rostami	Iran	
2017	Lasha Talakhadze	Georgia	
2018	Lasha Talakhadze	Georgia	
2019	Lasha Talakhadze	Georgia	

== Women ==
Year	Winner	Country	Ref
1991	Sun Caiyan	China	
1992	Peng Liping	China	
1993	Chen Shu-chih	Chinese Taipei	
1994	Guan Hong	China	
1995	Chen Shu-chih	Chinese Taipei	
1996	Li Hongyun	China	
1997	Tang Weifang	China	
1998	Tang Weifang	China	
1999	Ding Meiyuan	China	
2000	Ding Meiyuan	China	
2001	Valentina Popova	Russia	
2002	Wang Mingjuan	China	
2003	Liu Chunhong	China	
2004	Liu Chunhong	China	
2005	Pawina Thongsuk	Thailand	
2006	Chen Yanqing	China	
2007	Jang Mi-ran	South Korea	
2008	Liu Chunhong	China	
2009	Jang Mi-ran	South Korea	
2010	Svetlana Podobedova	Kazakhstan	
2011	Svetlana Tsarukaeva	Russia	
2012	Zulfiya Chinshanlo	Kazakhstan	
2013	Tatiana Kashirina	Russia	
2014	Tatiana Kashirina	Russia	
2015	Hsu Shu-ching	Chinese Taipei	
2016	Sopita Tanasan	Thailand	
2017	Lydia Valentín	Spain	
2018	Lydia Valentín	Spain	
2019	Katherine Nye	United States	

== See also ==
- International Weightlifting Federation
- World Weightlifting Championships
- List of world records in Olympic weightlifting
