= Lu Haojie =

Chinese weightlifter (born 1990)

Medal record

Men's Weightlifting

Representing China

Olympic Games
Silver medal – second place	2012 London	–77 kg

Lu Haojie (Chinese: 陆浩杰; pinyin: Lù Hàojié; born 3 August 1990) is a Chinese weightlifter. He competed for China at the 2012 Summer Olympics, winning the silver medal. At the 2012 Chinese National Games, Lu Haojie posted 175 kg in the snatch, and went on to win the National Games, placing ahead of Lu Xiaojun.

He won the silver medal at the 2012 Summer Olympics in the men's 77 kg category with a total of 360 kg. He injured his left elbow during his second snatch attempt of 175 kg, but went on to lift 190 kg in the clean and jerk to secure a silver medal.

== See also ==
- China at the 2012 Summer Olympics § Weightlifting
