= Jasurbek Jumaýew =

Turkmenistan weightlifter

Jasurbek Jumayev
Personal information
- Born: 12 December 1984 (age 41)
- Weight: 93.66 kg (206.5 lb)

Sport
- Country: Turkmenistan
- Sport: Weightlifting
- Team: National Team
- Updated on 4 September 2016

Jasurbek Jumayev (born 12 December 1984) is a Turkmenistan male weightlifter, competing in the 94 kg category and representing Turkmenistan at international competitions. He competed at world championships, most recently at the 2014 World Weightlifting Championships.

== Major results ==
Year	Venue	Weight	Snatch (kg)					Clean & Jerk (kg)					Total	Rank
Year	Venue	Weight	1	2	3	Result	Rank	1	2	3	Result	Rank	Total	Rank
Representing Turkmenistan
World Championships
2014	Almaty, Kazakhstan	94 kg	~~159~~	159	~~164~~	159	21	195	~~199~~	202	202	13	361	15
2011	Paris, France	94 kg	155	163	~~167~~	163	20	188	~~195~~	~~202~~	188	27	351	22
2010	Antalya, Turkey	85 kg	147	~~153~~	~~153~~	147	26	~~175~~	~~175~~	~~176~~	—	—	—	—
2009	Goyang, South Korea	77 kg	~~145~~	~~145~~	~~145~~	—	—	160	170	~~175~~	170	23	—	—
Asian Games
2014	Incheon, South Korea	94 kg	161	~~168~~	~~170~~	161	4	195	~~205~~	~~205~~	195	6	356	5
2010	Guangzhou, China	77 kg	137	~~141~~	~~147~~	137	5	159	~~167~~	~~174~~	159	6	296	4
Asian Championships
2009	Taldykorgan, Kazakhstan	77 kg	—N/a	—N/a	—N/a	145	7	—N/a	—N/a	—N/a	170	7	315	7
2008	Kanazawa, Japan	69 kg	~~126~~	126	~~130~~	126	16	145	150	~~153~~	150	16	276	14
Islamic Solidarity Games
2013	Palembang, Indonesia	94 kg	142	~~152~~	152	152	4	170	~~180~~	180	180	3	332	3rd place, bronze medalist(s)

== See also ==
- 2011 World Weightlifting Championships – Men's 94 kg
