= Olusola Friday =

Nigerian weightlifter (born 1990)

Personal information
- Full name: Olushola Friday
- Born: 28 February 1990 (age 36)
- Weight: 93.16 kg (205.4 lb)

Sport
- Country: Nigeria
- Sport: Weightlifting
- Weight class: 94 kg
- Team: National team
- Updated on 19 October 2016

Olushola Friday (born 28 February 1990) is a Nigerian male weightlifter, competing in the 94 kg category and representing Nigeria at international competitions. He participated at the 2014 Commonwealth Games in the 94 kg event.

Friday served a four-year competition ban from 2020 to 2024 from Sport Ireland and Weightlifting Ireland for two anti-doping rule violations. The violations were for the use of a prohibited substance (nandrolone and for refusing to submit to a test.

== Major competitions ==
Year	Venue	Weight	Snatch (kg)				Clean & Jerk (kg)				Total	Rank
Year	Venue	Weight	1	2	3	Rank	1	2	3	Rank	Total	Rank
Commonwealth Games
2014	Glasgow, Scotland	94 kg	~~145~~	145	150	—N/a	~~165~~	~~165~~	~~165~~	—N/a	0	---
