= Simplice Ribouem =

Cameroon-born Australian weightlifter

Personal information
- Nationality: Australian
- Born: 5 December 1982 (age 43) Douala, Cameroon
- Height: 173 cm (5 ft 8 in)
- Weight: 94 kg (14.8 st; 207 lb)

Sport
- Country: Australia
- Sport: Weightlifting
Medal record
Men's weightlifting
Representing Australia
Commonwealth Games
Gold medal – first place	2010 Delhi	85 kg
Silver medal – second place	2014 Glasgow	94 kg
Commonwealth Championships
Bronze medal – third place	2013 Penang	94 kg
Oceania Championships
Gold medal – first place	2009 Darwin (Note: 2009 Arafura Games also)	85 kg
Gold medal – first place	2010 Suva	94 kg
Gold medal – first place	2011 Darwin (Note: 2011 Arafura Games also)	94 kg
Silver medal – second place	2014 Le Mont-Dore	94 kg
Silver medal – second place	2016 Suva	94 kg

Simplice Ribouem (born 5 December 1982) is a Cameroon-born Olympian weightlifter who competed for Cameroon up to 2006, and for Australia from 2009. He finished 13th in the 94 kg event at the 2016 Summer Olympics.

Ribouem won bronze for Cameroon in the 85 kg event at the 2006 Commonwealth Games. He was an Australian gold medallist at the 2010 Commonwealth Games, winning a gold medal in the 85 kg event. Ribouem did not medal in the 2011 World Weightlifting Championships – Men's 94 kg. He won silver competing for Australia at the 2014 Commonwealth Games. Ribouem won a silver at the 2016 Oceania Weightlifting Championships.

== Results ==
Year	Event	Weight	Snatch (kg)	Clean & Jerk (kg)	Total (kg)	Rank
2009	Oceania and South Pacific Championships	85 kg	151	190	341	1
2009	World Championships	85 kg	146	187	333	15
2010	Oceania Championships	94 kg	152	191	343	1
2010	Commonwealth Games	85 kg	150	183	333	1
2011	Oceania Championships	94 kg	153	181	334	1
2011	World Championships	94 kg	150	190	340	26
2013	Commonwealth Championships	94 kg	150	187	337	3
2014	Oceania Championships	94 kg	152	197	349	2
2014	Commonwealth Games	94 kg	153	196	349	2
2016	Oceania Championships	94 kg	150	185	335	2
2016	Olympic Games	94 kg	155	185	340	13

Medalbox notes
