= Linda Matsebula =

Swazi weightlifter (born 1983)

Personal information
- Full name: Linda Matsebula
- Born: 2 April 1983 (age 43)
- Weight: 84.20 kg (185.6 lb)

Sport
- Country: Swaziland
- Sport: Weightlifting
- Weight class: 85 kg
- Team: National team
- Updated on 12 October 2016

Linda Matsebula (born 2 April 1983) is a Swazi male weightlifter, competing in the 85 kg category and representing Swaziland at international competitions. He participated at the 2010 Commonwealth Games in the 85 kg event.

== Major competitions ==
Year	Venue	Weight	Snatch (kg)				Clean & Jerk (kg)				Total	Rank
Year	Venue	Weight	1	2	3	Rank	1	2	3	Rank	Total	Rank
Commonwealth Games
2010	Delhi, India	85 kg	105	~~110~~	~~110~~	18	140	146	147	12	252	14
2006	Melbourne, Australia	77 kg	92	95	98	11	~~120~~	120	122	11	220	11
