= 2006 World Weightlifting Championships – Men's 94 kg =

The 2006 World Weightlifting Championships were held in Santo Domingo, Dominican Republic from 30 September to 7 October. The men's 94 kilograms division was staged on 5 and 6 October 2006.

== Schedule ==
Date	Time	Event
5 October 2006	18:00	Group D
5 October 2006	20:00	Group C
6 October 2006	10:00	Group B
6 October 2006	14:00	Group A

== Medalists ==
Event	Gold		Silver		Bronze	
Snatch	Roman Konstantinov (RUS)	177 kg	Mukhamat Sozaev (RUS)	176 kg	Ilya Ilyin (KAZ)	175 kg
Clean & Jerk	Szymon Kołecki (POL)	219 kg	Ilya Ilyin (KAZ)	217 kg	Yoandry Hernández (CUB)	216 kg
Total	Ilya Ilyin (KAZ)	392 kg	Szymon Kołecki (POL)	392 kg	Roman Konstantinov (RUS)	392 kg

== Records ==
Prior to this competition, the existing world records were as follows.

World Record	Snatch	Akakios Kakiasvilis (GRE)	188 kg	Athens, Greece	27 November 1999
World Record	Clean & Jerk	Szymon Kołecki (POL)	232 kg	Sofia, Bulgaria	29 April 2000
World Record	Total	World Standard	417 kg	—	1 January 1998

== Results ==
Rank	Athlete	Group	Body weight	Snatch (kg)				Clean & Jerk (kg)				Total
Rank	Athlete	Group	Body weight	1	2	3	Rank	1	2	3	Rank	Total
1st place, gold medalist(s)	Ilya Ilyin (KAZ)	A	93.26	170	175	~~177~~	3rd place, bronze medalist(s)	217	~~233~~	~~233~~	2nd place, silver medalist(s)	392
2nd place, silver medalist(s)	Szymon Kołecki (POL)	A	93.61	~~173~~	173	~~176~~	4	~~214~~	~~219~~	219	1st place, gold medalist(s)	392
3rd place, bronze medalist(s)	Roman Konstantinov (RUS)	B	93.77	170	~~177~~	177	1st place, gold medalist(s)	207	~~213~~	215	5	392
4	Mukhamat Sozaev (RUS)	B	93.06	170	~~176~~	176	2nd place, silver medalist(s)	210	215	~~220~~	4	391
5	Yoandry Hernández (CUB)	A	92.79	162	~~169~~	170	8	210	~~216~~	216	3rd place, bronze medalist(s)	386
6	Kostyantyn Piliyev (UKR)	B	93.54	162	167	171	7	205	211	214	6	385
7	Nikolaos Kourtidis (GRE)	B	93.65	165	170	173	5	210	~~217~~	~~217~~	7	383
8	José Juan Navarro (ESP)	A	93.20	165	170	~~173~~	9	205	208	~~211~~	8	378
9	Eugen Bratan (MDA)	A	93.86	170	~~175~~	~~175~~	11	~~202~~	202	208	9	378
10	Albert Kuzilov (GEO)	A	93.71	167	172	~~177~~	6	~~205~~	~~205~~	205	13	377
11	Bartłomiej Bonk (POL)	A	93.32	~~170~~	~~170~~	170	10	196	201	205	11	375
12	Santiago Martínez (ESP)	B	93.89	170	~~175~~	~~175~~	12	200	~~205~~	~~205~~	19	370
13	Joel Sotolongo (CUB)	B	93.94	160	165	~~168~~	15	201	~~208~~	~~208~~	14	366
14	Jürgen Spieß (GER)	B	92.79	161	165	~~168~~	14	~~197~~	200	~~205~~	15	365
15	Mohamed Eissa (EGY)	B	93.51	155	~~161~~	~~161~~	22	201	206	~~208~~	10	361
16	Lee Ung-jo (KOR)	B	93.61	155	~~160~~	160	17	~~196~~	196	200	18	360
17	Teimuraz Gogia (GEO)	B	93.20	160	~~165~~	~~165~~	16	190	195	197	20	357
18	Ángel Daza (VEN)	C	93.43	143	150	~~153~~	25	193	200	205	12	355
19	Konstantinos Papadopoulos (GRE)	C	93.44	155	~~160~~	~~160~~	21	191	200	~~201~~	17	355
20	Andriy Melnyk (UKR)	C	91.95	152	~~156~~	156	19	193	~~196~~	~~196~~	24	349
21	René Horn (GER)	C	93.00	146	~~150~~	~~150~~	30	191	195	200	16	346
22	Ondrej Kutlík (SVK)	C	89.06	~~150~~	150	~~155~~	23	190	195	~~200~~	23	345
23	Suthiphon Watthanakasikam (THA)	C	92.45	150	157	~~162~~	18	~~187~~	187	~~190~~	30	344
24	Yuki Hiraoka (JPN)	C	93.70	145	~~150~~	150	26	185	191	~~196~~	25	341
25	Khunchai Nuchpum (THA)	C	92.09	150	~~155~~	~~155~~	24	~~190~~	190	~~195~~	27	340
26	Jeffrey Wittmer (USA)	C	91.79	143	148	~~150~~	27	183	190	~~196~~	26	338
27	Yuriy Galkin (KAZ)	C	88.79	140	145	~~150~~	31	180	~~187~~	187	29	332
28	Osamu Mizuta (JPN)	C	92.75	~~135~~	135	140	35	~~182~~	182	189	28	329
29	Mantas Žvirblys (LTU)	C	91.41	145	~~150~~	~~150~~	32	~~182~~	182	~~187~~	31	327
30	Attila Kiss (HUN)	C	93.08	148	~~152~~	~~152~~	28	178	~~182~~	~~182~~	33	326
31	Anthony Martin (USA)	C	93.56	~~147~~	147	~~150~~	29	179	~~183~~	~~183~~	32	326
32	Juan Jiménez (DOM)	D	93.98	132	137	142	33	165	172	~~177~~	34	314
33	Nurgeldi Gorganow (TKM)	D	89.59	135	140	~~143~~	34	155	~~162~~	162	37	302
34	Luigi Grando (ITA)	D	93.94	130	~~137~~	~~137~~	37	~~166~~	166	—	36	296
35	David Nieves (PUR)	D	92.90	~~130~~	130	~~135~~	36	150	~~160~~	~~160~~	38	280
36	Nelson Gatica (CHI)	D	92.38	115	~~119~~	120	38	140	145	~~150~~	39	265
—	Vadim Vacarciuc (MDA)	A	93.92	167	~~170~~	~~170~~	13	~~208~~	~~208~~	~~208~~	—	—
—	Hsieh Wei-chun (TPE)	C	93.39	~~150~~	~~150~~	~~150~~	—	~~184~~	184	196	22	—
—	Milen Dobrev (BUL)	A	93.30	~~170~~	~~170~~	~~170~~	—	—	—	—	—	—
—	Mikalai Patotski (BLR)	A	92.97	~~175~~	~~175~~	~~175~~	—	196	~~200~~	~~200~~	21	—
—	Donatas Anuškevičius (LTU)	B	91.78	~~165~~	~~165~~	~~165~~	—	—	—	—	—	—
—	Nick Roberts (CAN)	D	90.15	~~140~~	~~140~~	~~140~~	—	~~170~~	~~170~~	170	35	—
—	Ruslan Kapaev (KGZ)	C	90.52	155	~~161~~	~~161~~	20	~~185~~	~~185~~	~~185~~	—	—
—	Eduardo Guadamud (ECU)	B	93.92	~~160~~	~~160~~	~~160~~	—	—	—	—	—	—
