= Saeid Mohammadpour =

Iranian weightlifter (born 1993)

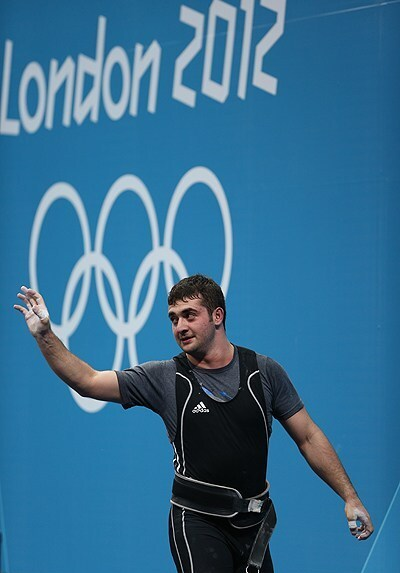
- Mohammadpour during 2012 Summer Olympics

Personal information
- Full name: Saeid Mohammadpour Karkaragh
- Nationality: Iran
- Born: March 3, 1993 (age 33)
- Height: 180 cm (5 ft 11 in)
- Weight: 105.00 kg (231.49 lb)

Sport
- Country: Iran
- Sport: Weightlifting

Achievements and titles
- Personal bests: Snatch: 183 kg (2012, JAR); Clean and jerk: 221 kg (2011); Total: 402 kg (2011)
Medal record
Men's weightlifting
Representing Iran
Olympic Games
Gold medal – first place	2012 London	94 kg
World Championships
Bronze medal – third place	2011 Paris	94 kg
World Juniors Championships
Gold medal – first place	2011 Penang	94 kg
Gold medal – first place	2012 Guate	94 kg
World Youth Championships
Bronze medal – third place	2009 Chiang Mai	85 kg

Saeid Mohammadpour Karkaragh (Persian: سعید محمدپور کرکرق, pronounced Sigh-eed Moha-mad-pour-car-kara, born March 3, 1993, in Ardabil, Iran) is an Iranian weightlifter.

Saeid finished fifth in the 2012 London Olympics, but in 2016 after retesting the samples of 2012 Summer Olympics athletes, it was discovered that the top four in his weight class had committed doping. Therefore, he became the gold medalist and Olympic Champion in 94 kg weightlifting category. He is also a bronze medalist at the 2011 World Championships in Paris.

== Major results ==
Year	Venue	Weight	Snatch (kg)				Clean & Jerk (kg)				Total	Rank
Year	Venue	Weight	1	2	3	Rank	1	2	3	Rank	Total	Rank
Olympic Games
2012	London, United Kingdom	94 kg	177	180	183	1	219	~~224~~	~~226~~	1	402	1st place, gold medalist(s)
World Championships
2011	Paris, France	94 kg	173	179	181	4	216	~~221~~	221	3rd place, bronze medalist(s)	402	3rd place, bronze medalist(s)
World Juniors Championships
2010	Sofia, Bulgaria	94 kg	~~160~~	~~160~~	~~162~~	--	187	~~195~~	~~195~~	7	---	--
2011	Penang, Malaysia	94 kg	166	171	175	1st place, gold medalist(s)	205	206	210	1st place, gold medalist(s)	385	1st place, gold medalist(s)
2012	Guatemala City, Guatemala	94 kg	171	178	~~182~~	1st place, gold medalist(s)	215	~~217~~	~~223~~	2nd place, silver medalist(s)	393	1st place, gold medalist(s)
World Youth Championships
2009	Chiang Mai, Thailand	85 kg	138	142	~~148~~	2nd place, silver medalist(s)	168	174	~~176~~	3rd place, bronze medalist(s)	316	3rd place, bronze medalist(s)
