= Narita Viliamu Tahega =

Niuean weightlifter (born 1989)

Narita Viliamu Tahega NCSS
Personal information
- Born: Narita Janne Freda Tuga Viliamu; 4 July 1989 (age 37) Alofi South, Niue
- Weight: 145 kg (320 lb)

Sport
- Country: Niue
- Sport: Weightlifting
Medal record
Women's Weightlifting
Representing Niue
Pacific Games
Silver medal – second place	2011 Nouméa	+75 kg
Pacific Mini Games
Silver medal – second place	2009 Rarotonga	+75 kg

Narita Viliamu Tahega NCSS (née Narita Janne Freda Tuga Viliamu; born 4 July 1989) is a Niuean weightlifter.

From 2003 to 2011, Viliamu Tahega won 38 medals in the 75 kg+ weight class across 13 international weightlifting competitions, giving her the recognition of having won the most medals of any Niuean athlete in international competition. Events Viliamu Tahega competed in include the Commonwealth Games, Pacific Games, Pacific Mini Games, and Oceania & South Pacific weightlifting championship. Her total medal record consists of 14 gold, 23 silver, and 1 bronze medal.

After her retirement from competitive weightlifting, Viliamu Tahega also served as an official in the Oceania Talent Identification Programme which, with the support of the International Weightlifting Federation, trains thousands of young weightlifters and selects top athletes to attend a training camp at the Oceania Weightlifting Institute. In 2018, Viliamu Tahega was elected the president of the Niue Weightlifting Federation and was reappointed to the position in 2020. In June 2022, Viliamu Tahega was nominated by the Niue Weightlifting Federation to the executive board of the Commonwealth Weightlifting Federation.

In 2020, Viliamu Tahega was awarded the Niue Community Service Star in recognition of her contributions to Niue athletics.

== Personal life ==
Viliamu Tahega is a police officer. In 2021, Viliamu Tahega was elected to the Alofi South Village Council. She also served in the Regional Assistance Mission to Solomon Islands (RAMSI). Viliamu Tahega's mother, Joan Sisiati Tahafa-Viliamu, served in the Niue Assembly as a common roll member from 2011 to 2014.
