= Krzysztof Zwarycz =

Polish weightlifter (born 1990)

Personal information
- Full name: Krzysztof Maciej Zwarycz
- Nationality: Polish
- Born: 13 December 1990 (age 35) Gdynia, Poland
- Weight: 77 kg (170 lb)

Sport
- Country: Poland
- Sport: Weightlifting
Medal record
Men's Weightlifting
Representing Poland
World Championships
Silver medal – second place	2017 Anaheim	–85 kg
European Championships
Bronze medal – third place	2017 Split	–85 kg

Krzysztof Maciej Zwarycz (born 13 December 1990) is a Polish male weightlifter, competing in the 77 kg category and representing Poland at international competitions. He participated at the 2012 Summer Olympics in the 77 kg event. He competed at world championships, most recently at the 2011 World Weightlifting Championships.

== Major results ==
Year	Venue	Weight	Snatch (kg)				Clean & Jerk (kg)				Total	Rank
Year	Venue	Weight	1	2	3	Rank	1	2	3	Rank	Total	Rank
Summer Olympics
2012	London, United Kingdom	77 kg	150	~~153~~	~~154~~	9	~~182~~	182	~~190~~	7	332	7
World Championships
2011	Paris, France	77 kg	~~140~~	~~140~~	~~140~~	---	---	---	---	---	0	---
