= Ashot Mkhitaryan =

Armenian weightlifter and coach

Ashot Mkhitaryan (Armenian: Աշոտ Մխիթարյան; July 16, 1959 – May 23, 2010) was the head of the National weightlifting team of Armenia.

Mkhitaryan trained the national team since 2006. Under his guidance, Armenia won 6 bronze medals at Olympic Games in Beijing, as well as many medals at European and World Championships.

== Achievements ==
Since 1996 to 2006 he was the chief coach of the youth and youngsters national weightlifting team of Armenia. Since 2006 to 2010 he was the chief coach of the national weightlifting team of Armenia. At the head of Ashot Mkhitaryan, Armenian weightlifters scored numerous victories in World and European Championships. The results of his team during the World and European Competitions since 1995 to 2010:

- In 1999 and 2003 his team became the winner at the European Youth Championship.
- In 1997, 1998 and 2001 his team became the 2nd winner at the European Youth Championship.
- In 2001 the team became the 2nd winner at the World Junior Championship and the champion at the European Junior Championship.
- In 2006 at the World Championship in Santo Domingo RA Weightlifting team had two bronze medalists:
  1. Ara Khachatryan(77 kg)-3rd place
  2. Tigran Martirosyan (85 kg)-3rd place
- In 2007 and 2008 RA team became the winner (with medals) at the European Championships with 18 (10 gold, 6 silver, 2 bronze) and 17 (13gold, 3silver, 1 bronze) medals.
- In 2007 at the World Championship the team have silver medalist (Gevorg Davtyan-77 kg), and they brought 5 places for the Olympic Games in 2008.
- In 2008 Beijing Olympic Games his team was 3rd with the quantity of medals after China and Russia (3 bronze medals):
  1. Tigran Gevorg Martirosyan (69 kg)
  2. Gevorg Davtyan (77 kg)
  3. Tigran Vardan Martirosyan (85 kg)
- In 2009 his team became the winner at the European under 23 weightlifting championship
- In 2009 his team was the fourth at the World Weightlifting Championships and brought home 12 medals (3 gold, 4 silver, 5 bronze).
- In 2010 RA Weightlifting Man team became the winner at the European Weightlifting Championships.
- Since 1995 RA weightlifting team have got many World and European champions, medalists and record-holders.
- Since 1995 his weightlifters have brought to Armenia about 300 World and European medals.
- Since 2003 Member of the commission of the National Olympic Committee of RA

== Education ==
- 1967–1977: Studied at the secondary School № 33, Gyumri, Armenia
- 1978–1982: Studied at the Institute of Sport of Yerevan (Gyumri)

== Certificates and Diplomas ==
- 1989—Certificate of a high-qualified coach of Armenia
- 2007—Certificate from the president of the IOC J. Rogge
- 2007—Diploma from the President of Armenia
- 2008—Diploma and medal from the president of Armenia
- 2008-- “Honored Worker of Sports” (Armenia)
- 2008-- “Order of The Peter the Great” for the huge work done for the international sport
- 2009—The “Movses Khorenatsi” medal from the president of Armenia

== Death ==
Ashot Mkhitaryan died of a heart attack in Zvartnots International Airport (Yerevan, Armenia) on May 23, 2010 when welcoming the youth weightlifting team returning from Valencia after the European Championships.
