= Su Dajin =

Chinese weightlifter (born 1986)

Medal record

Men's Weightlifting

Representing China

World Weightlifting Championships
Silver medal – second place	2011 Paris	−77 kg
Bronze medal – third place	2009 Goyang	−77 kg

Su Dajin (born April 20, 1986) is a Chinese weightlifter. He got silver the World Weightlifting Championships 2011 held at Paris.
