= Hysen Pulaku =

Albanian weightlifter (born 1992)

Hysen Pulaku (born 8 December 1992) is an Albanian weightlifter. On July 23, 2012, Pulaku tested positive for stanozolol, a banned anabolic steroid. On July 28, the International Olympic Committee formally ejected Pulaku from the 2012 Summer Olympics in London where he was scheduled to compete in the men's 77kg division.
