= Jean Greeff =

South African weightlifter

Personal information
- Nationality: South African
- Born: 17 April 1990 (age 34); Johannesburg, South Africa
- Height: 1.81 m (5 ft 11 in)
- Weight: 94 kg (207 lb)

Sport
- Country: South Africa
- Sport: Weightlifting

Achievements and titles
- Olympic finals: 2012 London Olympics
- World finals: 2008 Pune Youth Commonwealth Games

Jean Greeff (born 17 April 1990) is a South African weightlifter. He competed in the Men's 94 kg event at the 2012 Summer Olympics.
