= Ilya Ilyin =

Kazakhstani weightlifter (born 1988)

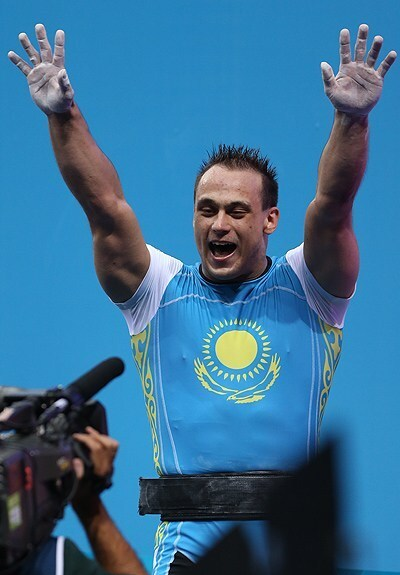
- Ilyin in 2012 Summer Olympics

Personal information
- Nationality: Kazakhstani
- Born: 24 May 1988 (age 38) Kzyl-Orda, Kazakh SSR, Soviet Union
- Height: 1.74 m (5 ft 9 in)
- Weight: 104.35 kg (230.1 lb)
- Website: www.ilya-ilyin.kz

Sport
- Sport: Weightlifting
- Event: -105 kg
- Coached by: Toyshan Bektemirov, Erzhas Boltaev

Achievements and titles
- Personal bests: Snatch: 191 kg (2015); Clean and jerk: 246 kg (2015, WR); Total: 437 kg (2015, WR)
Medal record
Representing Kazakhstan
Olympic Games
Disqualified	2008 Beijing	94 kg
Disqualified	2012 London	94 kg
World Championships
Gold medal – first place	2005 Doha	85 kg
Gold medal – first place	2006 Santo Domingo	94 kg
Gold medal – first place	2011 Paris	94 kg
Gold medal – first place	2014 Almaty	105 kg
Asian Games
Gold medal – first place	2006 Doha	94 kg
Gold medal – first place	2010 Guangzhou	94 kg

Ilya Aleksandrovich Ilyin (Russian: Илья Александрович Ильин; born 24 May 1988) is a Kazakhstani retired weightlifter who won four world championships and was regarded as one of the greatest weightlifters of all time, until banned for doping abuse in both 2008 and 2012 Olympics. On 12 December 2015 at the President's Cup in Grozny, Russia, Ilyin set two world records in the −105 kg class. He lifted 246 kg in the clean and jerk and 437 kg in the total. Ilyin was named IWF World Weightlifter of the Year four times: in 2005, 2006, 2014, and 2015.

Originally a two-time Olympic gold medallist in 2008 and 2012, Ilyin was officially stripped of his gold medals on 25 November 2016, by the IWF due to doping violations after retests of his samples given at the 2008 and 2012 Olympics.

== Athletic career ==
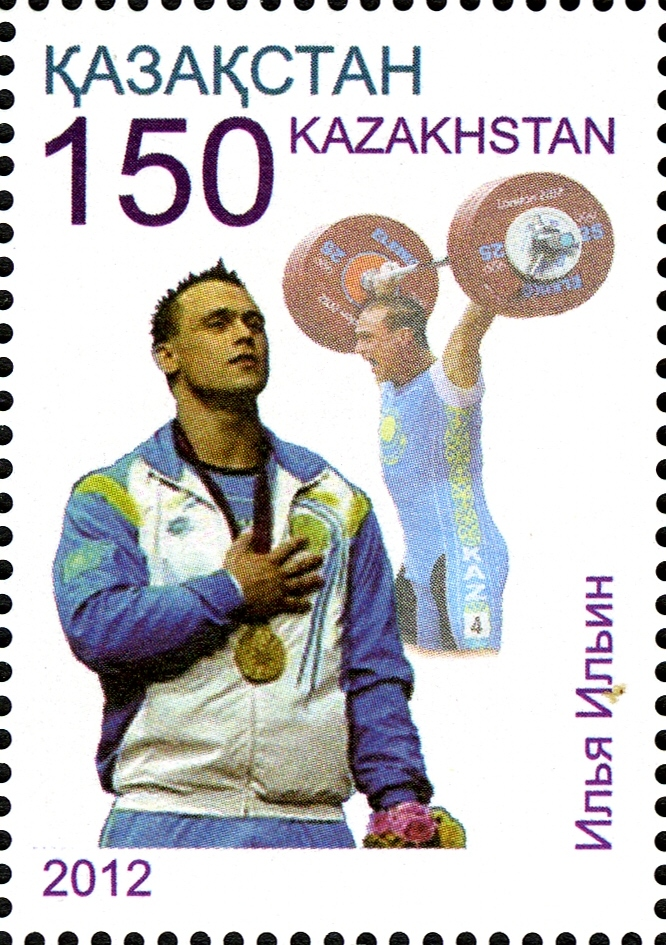
Ilyin on a 2013 stamp of Kazakhstan

Ilyin became Kazakhstan's first junior and senior weightlifting world champion when he placed first overall in the −85 kg class at the 2005 World Weightlifting Championships. He snatched 170 kg and clean and jerked 216 kg (for which he also won the clean and jerk phase) for a total of 386 kg. His total of 386 was the youth world record for the now retired −85 kg class.

The next year Ilyin competed in the 94 kg class at the 2006 Junior World Weightlifting Championships, 2006 World Weightlifting Championships and 2006 Asian Games in Doha, winning all these competitions. At the 2006 Junior World Weightlifting Championships he snatched 176 kg and clean and jerked 225 kg for a total of 401 kg; Andrei Aramnau from Belarus captured the silver medal with 393 kg total with 177 kg snatch and 216 kg clean and jerk.

In September 2006 Ilyin snatched 175 kg and clean and jerked 217 kg for a total of 392 kg, securing the gold medal in the −94 kg category at 2006 World Weightlifting Championships. With his final two lifts in the clean and jerk phase he attempted to set a world record with 233 kg but was unsuccessful. In December 2006 Ilyin won the −94 kg class at 2006 Asian Games, snatching 175 kg and clean and jerking 226 kg for a total of 401 kg. After a very successful year Ilyin was named 2006 IWF World Weightlifter of the Year for the second time.

Ilyin competed in the −94 kg class at the 2008 Summer Olympics in Beijing and originally won the gold medal, snatching 180 kg and clean and jerking 226 kg for a total of 406 kg.

In 2011, Ilyin competed in the −94 kg class at the world championships and once again won the gold medal in both the clean and jerk and the overall. He snatched 181 kg and clean and jerked 226 kg for a total of 407 kg.

Ilyin originally won the gold medal at the 2012 Summer Olympics in the 94 kg category with a world and Olympic record total of 418 kg. He was successful in all three snatch attempts with lifts of 177 kg, 182 kg, and 185 kg. He was also successful in all three clean and jerk attempts with lifts of 224 kg, 228 kg, and 233 kg. His final lift of 233 kg was initially recognized as the world and Olympic record in the clean and jerk. On 14 September 2016 all of these results were annulled and his medal stripped for doping violations.

On 8 November 2012 Ilyin was awarded the Olympic Council of Asia award as the best Asian athlete, along with Zulfiya Chinshanlo and Olga Rypakova.

Ilyin competed in the -105 kg category at the 2014 World Weightlifting Championships held in Almaty. He snatched 183 kg, 187 kg and 190 kg, placing third. Ilyin made two out of three lifts in the clean and jerk, lifting 233 kg on his opener and on his final lift of 242 kg, breaking the clean and jerk world record and winning the competition by virtue of lighter body weight.

On 12 December 2015 Ilyin competed in the Iwf Grand Prix 5th Russian Federation Presidents Cup held in Grozny. Ilyin completed two out of three lifts in the snatch, going 184 kg on his opener and 191 kg on his final attempt to secure the gold medal. In the clean and jerk Ilyin made two lifts with a third lift in hand, going 231 kg on his opener before making a 15 kg jump to break his own clean and jerk world record and successfully hitting 246 kg to win the gold medal. This total of 191/246 gave him the new total world record of 437 kg.

In March 2016 Ilyin was named the IWF World Weightlifter of the Year for the fourth time in his career.

In June 2016 it was announced by the IWF that retests of the samples taken from the 2012 Summer Olympics indicated that Ilyin had tested positive for prohibited substances, namely dehydrochloromethyltestosterone and stanozolol. On 14 September 2016, Ilyin was stripped of his second Olympic medal.

In June 2016 it was announced by the IWF that retests of the samples taken from 2008 Summer Olympics indicated that Ilyin had tested positive for stanozolol. In November 2016, Ilyin was stripped of both his Olympic gold medals as a result of doping violations from his retested samples.

Ilyin is a member of the Astana Presidential Club.

== Personal life ==
In 2008 Ilya married the Russian weightlifter Svetlana Podobedova, the marriage did not last long.

On September 9, 2012, he married Natalia Kulakova, a multiple champion of Kazakhstan in handball. In November 2017, the couple divorced, they have a daughter Milana from a joint marriage.

On January 12, 2023, Ilya Ilyin married for the third time to businesswoman Tatiana Gordienko.

== Results ==
Major results:

Year	Venue	Weight	Snatch (kg)				Clean & Jerk (kg)				Total	Rank
Year	Venue	Weight	1	2	3	Rank	1	2	3	Rank	Total	Rank
Olympic Games
2008	Beijing, China	94 kg	175	180	--	--	~~223~~	223	226	--	406	DSQ
2012	London, United Kingdom	94 kg	177	182	185	--	224	228	233	--	418	DSQ
World Championships
2005	Doha, Qatar	85 kg	165	170	~~173~~	7	205	211	216	1st place, gold medalist(s)	386	1st place, gold medalist(s)
2006	(Dominican Republic) Santo Domingo, Dominican Rep	94 kg	170	175	~~177~~	3rd place, bronze medalist(s)	217	~~233~~	~~233~~	2nd place, silver medalist(s)	392	1st place, gold medalist(s)
2011	Paris, France	94 kg	175	181	~~184~~	5	221	226	--	1st place, gold medalist(s)	407	1st place, gold medalist(s)
2014	Almaty, Kazakhstan	105 kg	183	187	190	3rd place, bronze medalist(s)	233	~~239~~	242	1st place, gold medalist(s)	432	1st place, gold medalist(s)
2018	Ashgabat, Turkmenistan	102 kg	--	--	--	--	--	--	--	--	--	--
2019	Pattaya, Thailand	96 kg	165	168	~~171~~	8	195	~~200~~	~~200~~	20	363	13
Asian Games
2006	Doha, Qatar	94 kg	162	166	171	1	205	215	226	1	397	1st place, gold medalist(s)
2010	Guangzhou, China	94 kg	170	175	~~178~~	3	215	219	~~227~~	1	394	1st place, gold medalist(s)
Asian Championships
2019	Ningbo, China	96 kg	155	~~160~~	160	5	185	--	--	6	345	5
World Junior Championships
2005	Busan, South Korea	85 kg	155	161	168	2nd place, silver medalist(s)	197	202	206	1st place, gold medalist(s)	374	1st place, gold medalist(s)
2006	Hangzhou, China	94 kg	165	171	176	2nd place, silver medalist(s)	215	217	225	1st place, gold medalist(s)	401	1st place, gold medalist(s)
IWF Grand Prix
2015	Grozny, Russia	105 kg	184	~~188~~	191	1	231	246	--	1	437	1st place, gold medalist(s)
2018	Doha, Qatar	109 kg	--	--	--	--	--	--	--	--	--	--
2019	Doha, Qatar	96 kg	~~165~~	165	~~171~~	4	~~200~~	200	~~206~~	6	365	5
British International Open
2019	(United Kingdom) Coventry, Great Britain	96 kg	~~155~~	160	165	1	180	185	~~190~~	2	350	2nd place, silver medalist(s)
Olympic Test
2019	Tokyo, Japan	109 kg	~~165~~	165	~~171~~	4	~~200~~	200	~~206~~	8	365	8
