= Chatuphum Chinnawong =

Thai weightlifter

Personal information
- Born: July 19, 1993 (age 32) Nakhon Ratchasima, Thailand
- Height: 1.64 m (5 ft 4 1/2 in)
- Weight: 77 kg (170 lb)

Sport
- Country: Thailand
- Sport: Weightlifting

Chatuphum Chinnawong (Thai: จตุภูมิ ชินวงศ์; born 19 July 1993 in Nakhon Ratchasima, Thailand) is a Thai weightlifter competing in the 77 kg category. He finished fourth at the 2012 Summer Olympics and 2016 Summer Olympics. This stands to be upgraded to third, pending the IOC medal reallocation process, as a result of the gold medalist being disqualified for doping offences.

== Results ==
Year	Event	Location	Body weight	Snatch (kg)				Clean & Jerk (kg)				Total	Rank
Year	Event	Location	Body weight	1	2	3	Rank	1	2	3	Rank	Total	Rank
2016	Summer Olympics Men -77 kg	Rio de Janeiro, Brazil	76.52	160	~~165~~	165	2	~~191~~	~~191~~	191	4	356	4
2012	Summer Olympics Men -77 kg	London, England, United Kingdom	76.64	157	~~161~~	~~162~~	4	191	~~195~~	~~195~~	4	348	4
2011	World Championships Men -77 kg	Paris, France	76.60	~~146~~	146	~~151~~	20	~~185~~	185	~~189~~	11	331	13
2011	Junior Asian Championships Men -85 kg	Pattaya, Thailand	77.65	145	150	153	2nd place, silver medalist(s)	183	~~189~~	189	1st place, gold medalist(s)	342	1st place, gold medalist(s)
2011	Junior World Championships Men -77 kg	Penang, Malaysia	76.40	145	~~150~~	150	4	179	~~185~~	185	2nd place, silver medalist(s)	335	3rd place, bronze medalist(s)
2010	Summer Youth Olympics Boys -77 kg	Singapore	76.69	133	138	141	2	160	170	~~183~~	2	311	2nd place, silver medalist(s)
2009	Youth World Championships Boys -69 kg	Chiang Mai, Thailand	68.66	~~115~~	115	~~120~~	11	145	~~150~~	~~150~~	7	260	9
