= Artem Ivanov (weightlifter) =

Ukrainian and Russian weightlifter (born 1987)

Medal record

Men's Weightlifting

Representing Ukraine

World Championships
Silver medal – second place	2010 Antalya	– 94 kg
Silver medal – second place	2011 Paris	– 94kg

European Championships
Silver medal – second place	2010 Minsk	– 94 kg

Artem Ivanov (born December 16, 1987, in Dnipropetrovsk) is a Ukrainian (until 2014) and Russian (since 2014) weightlifter. His best total is 420 kg (190 snatch + 230 clean and jerk - Ukrainian Championships 2012). If this had not been completed at a domestic event, it would have represented a substantial increase on the world record at this weight division. At the 2012 Olympic Games, Ivanov did not appear for his weigh-in, prompting speculation of injury, and leaving rival Ilya Ilyin to comfortably retain his title.
