= Jack Oliver (weightlifter) =

British weightlifter (born 1991)

Personal information
- Nationality: British
- Born: 4 January 1991 (age 35) Sidcup, England
- Height: 168 cm (5 ft 6 in)
- Weight: 77 kg (170 lb)

Sport
- Country: Great Britain
- Sport: Weightlifting
- Event: –77kg
- Club: Europa Weightlifting Club
- Coached by: Andy Callard & Tamas Feher

Achievements and titles
- Olympic finals: 10th
- Regional finals: 1st
- National finals: 1st
- Personal best: 320 kg (2015)
Medal record
Representing England
Men's weightlifting
Commonwealth Games
Silver medal – second place	2018 Gold Coast	77 kg
- Updated on 18 April 2018

Jack Simon Oliver (born 4 January 1991) is a weightlifter competing in the 77 kg category, representing England and Great Britain.

== Early life ==
Oliver was educated at Eltham College.

== Career ==
Oliver represented England at the Commonwealth Games in Delhi in 2010, and competed in his first World Weightlifting Championships for Great Britain in Paris, France in 2011. That year, he also won the Commonwealth Championship. In 2012 Oliver competed in the European Weightlifting Championships in Bucharest, and was later selected to represent Team GB at the 2012 Summer Olympics.

=== London 2012 Olympics ===
Oliver represented Team GB in the Olympic weightlifting at London 2012, competing in the 77 kg event. Oliver was successful in two of his three snatch attempts at ExCeL, lifting 140 kg on his 3rd attempt. In the clean and jerk Oliver completed three good attempts, finishing with a lift of 170 kg giving him an 8 kg personal best. Oliver's total of 310 kg meant he finished 10th overall, the best result of any British weightlifter at the London 2012 games.

At the 2014 Commonwealth Games, he finished in 4th, lifting 142 kg in the snatch and 171 kg in the clean and jerk for a total of 313 kg.

At the 2018 Commonwealth Games, he won the silver medal the 77 kg division. He lifted 145 kg in the snatch and 167 kg in the clean and jerk for a total of 312 kg.

He competed in the men's 73 kg event at the 2022 Commonwealth Games held in Birmingham, England.

== Major results ==
Year	Venue	Weight	Snatch (kg)				Clean & Jerk (kg)				Total	Rank
Year	Venue	Weight	1	2	3	Rank	1	2	3	Rank	Total	Rank
Representing Great Britain
Olympic Games
2012	(United Kingdom) London, Great Britain	77 kg	~~135~~	135	140	11	160	165	170	10	310	10
World Championships
2015	Houston, United States	77 kg	136	~~140~~	140	33	170	~~176~~	176	28	316	29
2013	Wrocław, Poland	85 kg	135	140	~~143~~	22	~~173~~	173	~~181~~	21	313	21
2011	Paris, France	77 kg	132	137	140	26	~~155~~	155	160	29	300	26
European Championships
2019	(Georgia (country)) Batumi, Georgia	81 kg	142	146	~~150~~	12	172	~~176~~	176	14	322	13
2016	Førde, Norway	77 kg	140	144	~~148~~	15	173	~~178~~	—	14	317	15
2015	(Georgia (country)) Tbilisi, Georgia	77 kg	140	145	~~150~~	10	170	175	~~180~~	10	320	11
2012	Antalya, Turkey	77 kg	~~137~~	137	142	14	~~162~~	162	~~167~~	19	304	16
Universiade
2011	Shenzhen, China	77 kg	130	~~135~~	~~135~~	14	152	~~157~~	~~157~~	15	282	15
Representing England
Commonwealth Games
2018	Gold Coast, Australia	77 kg	141	145	~~148~~	1st place, gold medalist(s)	167	~~171~~	~~171~~	4	312	2nd place, silver medalist(s)
2014	Glasgow, Scotland	77 kg	138	142	~~145~~	3	171	~~174~~	~~174~~	5	313	4
2010	Delhi, India	77 kg	121	~~126~~	~~130~~	9	142	148	~~152~~	7	269	8
Commonwealth Championships
2017	Gold Coast, Australia	77 kg	127	131	~~135~~	6	155	160	~~165~~	10	291	10
2011	Cape Town, South Africa	77 kg	130	135	137	2nd place, silver medalist(s)	155	~~160~~	160	3rd place, bronze medalist(s)	297	3rd place, bronze medalist(s)
