= Taubena Tatonga =

I-Kiribati weightlifter (born 1990)

Personal information
- Full name: Taubena Tatonga
- Born: 23 August 1990 (age 35)
- Weight: 76.33 kg (168.3 lb)

Sport
- Country: Kiribati
- Sport: Weightlifting
- Weight class: 77 kg
- Team: National team
- Updated on 11 October 2016

Taubena Tatonga (born 23 August 1990) is an I-Kiribati male weightlifter, competing in the 77 kg category and representing Kiribati at international competitions. He won the bronze medal at the 2013 Pacific Mini Games. He participated at the 2010 Commonwealth Games in the 77 kg event and at the 2014 Commonwealth Games.

== Major competitions ==
| Year | Venue | Weight | Snatch (kg) | | | | Clean & Jerk (kg) | | | | Total | Rank |
| Year | Venue | Weight | 1 | 2 | 3 | Rank | 1 | 2 | 3 | Rank | Total | Rank |
Commonwealth Games
| 2010 | Delhi, India | 77 kg | ~~110~~ | ~~110~~ | ~~110~~ | —N/a | --- | --- | --- | —N/a | 0 | --- |
| 2014 | Glasgow, Scotland | 85 kg | 115 | ~~120~~ | ~~120~~ | —N/a | 145 | ~~151~~ | ~~151~~ | —N/a | 260 | 15 |
