= Sa Jae-hyouk =

South Korean weightlifter (born 1985)

Personal information
- Native name: 사재혁
- Born: January 29, 1985 (age 41) Hongcheon, South Korea
- Height: 165 cm (5 ft 5 in)

Sport
- Sport: Weightlifting
Medal record
Representing South Korea
Men's Weightlifting
Olympic Games
Gold medal – first place	2008 Beijing	– 77 kg
World Championships
Bronze medal – third place	2011 Paris	– 77 kg

Sa Jae-Hyouk (Korean: 사재혁; Hanja: 史載赫; pronounced [sa.dʑɛ̝.ɦjʌk̚]; born January 29, 1985) is a South Korean weightlifter. He is 165 cm tall. He was born in Hongcheon, Gangwon Province, South Korea.

In 2005, Sa won two gold medals in the clean and jerk and total at the 1st Junior World Weightlifting Championships in Busan, South Korea.

At the 2007 World Weightlifting Championships he ranked 5th in the 77 kg category, with a total of 353 kg.

In 2008, he won a gold medal in the 77 kg class at the 2008 Summer Olympics in Beijing.

At the 2009 World Weightlifting Championships he ranked 4th in the 77 kg category, with a total of 365 kg.

At the 2012 Summer Olympics, he dislocated his elbow while attempting 162 kg in his second snatch attempt and was forced to withdraw from the competition.
