= Chandrakant Mali =

Indian weightlifter (born 1987)

Personal information
- Nationality: Indian
- Born: 27 August 1987 (age 38) Kurundawad, Kolhapur, India

Sport
- Country: India
- Sport: Weightlifting
- Event: 94 Kg
- Updated on 30 July 2014

Chandrakant Mali is an Indian Weightlifter, who won bronze medal in the men's 94 kg weight class at the 2014 Commonwealth Games at Glasgow, Scotland.
