= Tigran Gevorg Martirosyan =

Armenian weightlifter (born 1988)

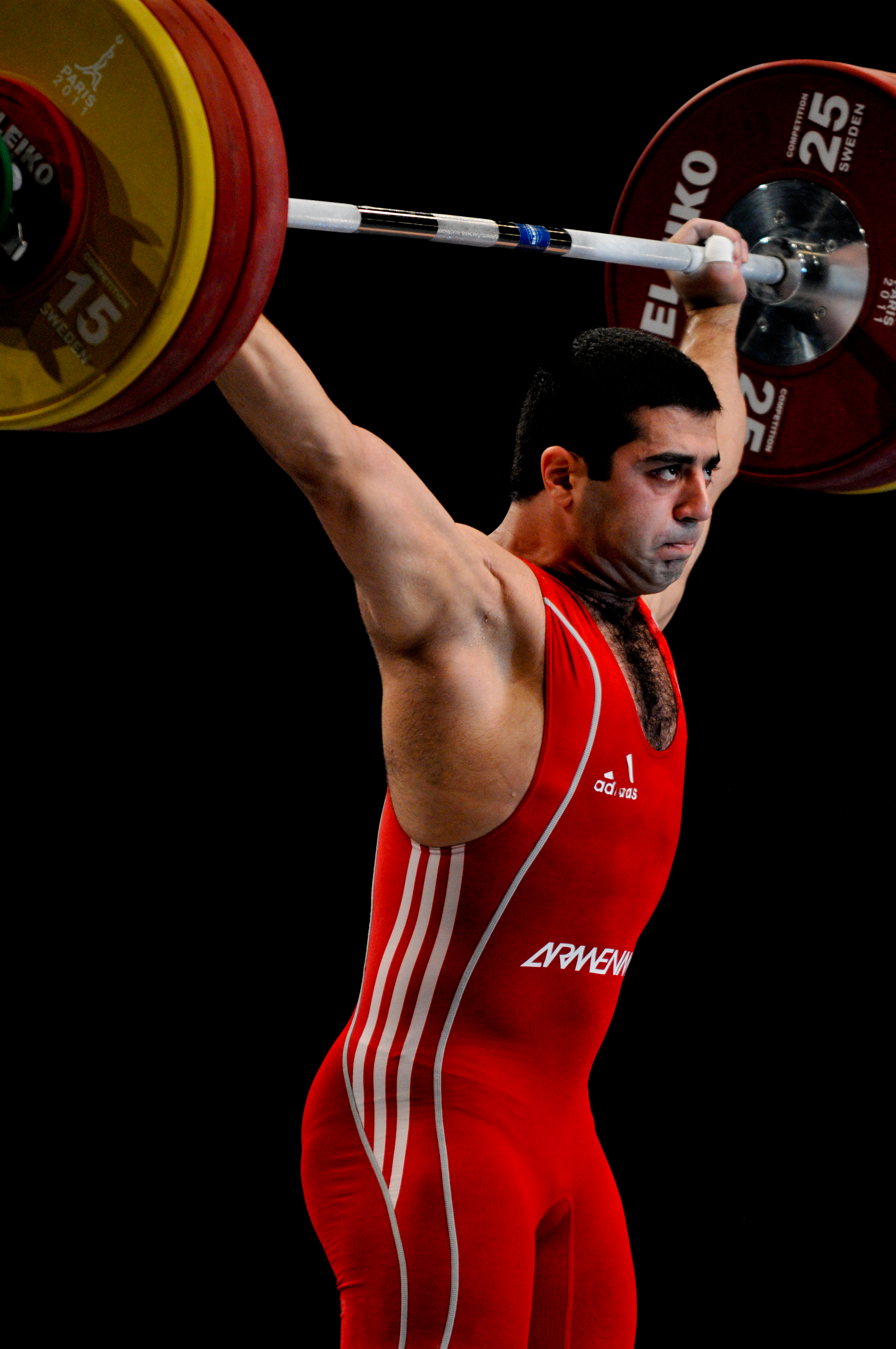
- Martirosyan in 2011

Personal information
- Born: June 9, 1988 (age 38) Leninakan, Armenian SSR (now Gyumri, Armenia)
Medal record
Representing Armenia
Men's Weightlifting
Olympic Games
Disqualified	2008 Beijing	-69 kg
World Championships
Gold medal – first place	2010 Antalya	-77 kg
Silver medal – second place	2009 Goyang	-77 kg
European Championships
Gold medal – first place	2008 Lignano Sabbiadoro	-69 kg
Gold medal – first place	2010 Minsk	-77 kg
Gold medal – first place	2015 Tbilisi	-77 kg
Silver medal – second place	2007 Strasbourg	-69 kg
Silver medal – second place	2016 Førde	-77 kg

Tigran Gevorg Martirosyan (Armenian: Տիգրան Գ. Մարտիրոսյան, born June 9, 1988, in Leninakan, Armenian SSR) is an Armenian weightlifter. He was awarded the Honored Master of Sports of Armenia title in 2009. Martirosyan is an Armenian Champion, three-time European Champion, World Champion and was temporarily acknowledged as the youngest Olympic medalist from Armenia before being stripped of the medal for doping violations.

== Early life ==
Tigran was born on June 9, 1988, in Leninakan, Armenian SSR (now Gyumri, Armenia) to Gevorg Martirosyan, a well-known Armenian weightlifter, and Seda Yakhanedjyan. His father's family is from Kars and his mothers family is from Sivas. He has an older and a younger brother and an older sister. Tigran was named after King Tigranes the Great, who ruled the Kingdom of Armenia at its greatest extent, and his father.

Although, Tigran's father didn't make his sons follow in his footsteps, they received a love of the sport at an early age from him. Hayk, Tigran's older brother, became a Master of Sports in weightlifting. But he had to quit it because of family problems when their father died at the age of 45. Tigran started to practice weightlifting at the age of 11. By 13, he had already won Armenia's Weightlifting Championship.

== Career ==
After the death of his father, Martirosyan began weight training under the guidance of Ashot Mkhitaryan.

Tigran had a successful youth career, becoming a 2003 European Vice-Champion and a 2004 European Champion. In the same year, he won the gold medal of the 2004 European Championship among juniors. The following year, he won a gold medal at the 2005 European Championships among juniors again. Martirosyan also set two world records as a junior in the snatch and the total, both in the lightweight (69 kg) division, and still holds both of these records to this day.

In 2006, Martirosyan began performing in adult level competitions. He competed at the 2006 World Weightlifting Championships and came in 6th place in the lightweight category with a total of 306 kg.

Martirosyan won the silver medal at the 2007 European Weightlifting Championships in Strasbourg, with 331 kg in total. The next year, he won the gold medal at the 2008 European Weightlifting Championships in Lignano, with 346 kg in total.

Martirosyan was initially awarded a bronze medal at the 2008 Summer Olympics, lifting 153 in the snatch, 185 in the clean & jerk and 338 kg in the total. Martirosyan had tied in total with French weightlifter Vencelas Dabaya. Because Dabaya weighed a little less than Martirosyan, he was awarded the silver medal instead, despite Martirosyan having also lifted the second greatest total. At the age of 20 years and 64 days, Martirosyan was provisionally recognized as the youngest Olympic medalist from the independent Rupublic of Armenia. However, in 2016, he was stripped of his medal and disqualified from the Beijing 2008 Olympics following reanalysis of his samples from the 2008 Olympics, resulted in a positive test for the prohibited substances stanozolol and turinabol.

In 2009, Tigran Martirosyan moved to a heavier weight class, from lightweight (69 kg) to middleweight (77 kg).

Martirosyan debuted in the middleweight division at the 2009 World Weightlifting Championships in Goyang, where he took second place with a total of 370 kg, losing only to the Chinese weightlifter Lü Xiaojun, who set two of the three middleweight world records at the Championships.

In a landslide victory, Martirosyan won a gold medal at the 2010 European Weightlifting Championships, becoming a two-time European Champion.

Weeks later, Martirosyan's mentor suddenly Ashot Mkhitaryan died of a heart attack on May 23, 2010.

Martirosyan competed at the 2010 World Weightlifting Championships in Antalya. Xiaojun had also returned and was considered a massive favorite to win the Championship once again. Martirosyan had scored the highest in the snatch and tied Xiaojun in the clean & jerk. As a result, Martirosyan defeated Xiaojun in a shocking upset and won the gold medal. Martirosyan lifted a total of 373 kg, just 5 kg short of the world record. Martirosyan made history as the first ever male weightlifter from the independent Republic of Armenia to become a World Champion in weightlifting. Martirosyan dedicated his victory to the memory of his late coach Ashot Mkhitaryan.

For his accomplishments that year, Martirosyan was voted the Armenian Athlete of the Year for 2010.

Martirosyan could not repeat his success at the 2011 World Weightlifting Championships. He managed to win a bronze medal in the snatch, but came in fourth place in the total. Martirosyan announced before the tournament that he sustained an injured shoulder and, as a result, was unable to compete at full strength. He received treatment in Germany and recovered soon afterward.

Martirosyan qualified for the 2012 Summer Olympics and was Armenia's greatest gold medal hope. Unfortunately, he received a back injury just days before he was supposed to compete and was unable to participate. Martirosyan later revealed that this injury had been worsening over the past month. His injury was not as serious as his former one and he will be able to compete again the following year. He now has his sights set on the next Olympics.

== Personal life ==
Martirosyan had the honor of lighting the fire at the Vazgen Sargsyan Republican Stadium in Yerevan for the 5th Pan-Armenian Games on August 13, 2011.
