= Endri Karina =

Albanian weightlifter (born 1989)

Endri Karina (born 2 March 1989 in Elbasan, Albania) is an Albanian weightlifter. He competed for Albania at the 2012 Summer Olympics in the men's 94 kg category. He finished in 14th place with a total of 350 kg, 195 kg in the clean and jerk and 155 kg in the snatch.
