= Alexandros Amanatidis =

Cypriot weightlifter (born 1987)

Personal information
- Born: 12 May 1987 (age 37)
- Weight: 76.37 kg (168 lb)

Sport
- Country: Cyprus
- Sport: Weightlifting
- Weight class: 77 kg
- Team: National team
- Updated on 11 October 2016

Alexandros Amanatidis (born 12 May 1987) is a Cypriot male weightlifter, competing in the 77 kg category and representing Cyprus at international competitions. He participated at the 2010 Commonwealth Games in the 77 kg event.

== Major competitions ==
Year	Venue	Weight	Snatch (kg)				Clean & Jerk (kg)				Total	Rank
Year	Venue	Weight	1	2	3	Rank	1	2	3	Rank	Total	Rank
Commonwealth Games
2014	Glasgow, Scotland	77 kg	125	~~130~~	~~132~~	—	155	~~160~~	~~160~~	—	280	11
2010	Delhi, India	77 kg	126	~~132~~	132	—	157	~~162~~	~~162~~	—	289	5
