= Josefa Vueti =

Fijian weightlifter (born 1979)

Personal information
- Nationality: Fiji
- Born: 6 February 1979 (age 47) Levuka, Fiji
- Height: 1.78 m (5 ft 10 in)
- Weight: 76 kg (168 lb)

Sport
- Sport: Weightlifting
- Event: 77 kg

Josefa Vueti (born 6 February 1979 in Levuka) is a Fijian weightlifter. Vueti represented Fiji at the 2008 Summer Olympics in Beijing, where he competed for the men's middleweight category (77 kg). Vueti placed twenty-third in this event, as he successfully lifted 124 kg in the single-motion snatch, and hoisted 155 kg in the two-part, shoulder-to-overhead clean and jerk, for a total of 279 kg.
