= Beru Karianako =

I-Kiribati weightlifter

Personal information
- Full name: Beru Karianako
- Born: 18 September 1988 (age 37)
- Weight: 84.32 kg (185.9 lb)

Sport
- Country: Kiribati
- Sport: Weightlifting
- Weight class: 85 kg
- Team: National team
- Updated on 12 October 2016

Beru Karianako (born 18 September 1988) is an I-Kiribati male weightlifter, competing in the 85 kg category and representing Kiribati at international competitions. He participated at the 2010 Commonwealth Games in the 85 kg event.

== Major competitions ==
Year	Venue	Weight	Snatch (kg)				Clean & Jerk (kg)				Total	Rank
Year	Venue	Weight	1	2	3	Rank	1	2	3	Rank	Total	Rank
Commonwealth Games
2010	Delhi, India	85 kg	107	112	~~117~~	—N/a	140	~~150~~	~~150~~	—N/a	252	15
