= Petit Minkoumba =

Cameroonian weightlifter

Personal information
- Full name: Petit David Minkoumba
- Nationality: Cameroonian
- Born: 27 February 1989 (age 37)
- Height: 1.71 m (5 ft 7 1/2 in)
- Weight: 92 kg (203 lb)

Sport
- Country: Cameroon
- Sport: Weightlifting
- Event: 94 kg

Petit David Minkoumba (born 27 February 1989) is a Cameroonian weightlifter.

He competed at the 2016 Summer Olympics in Rio de Janeiro, in the men's 94 kg. He competed at world championships, most recently at the 2009 World Weightlifting Championships.

In April 2018, he was one of eight Cameroonian athletes who went missing from their accommodation during the 2018 Commonwealth Games.

== Major results ==
Year	Venue	Weight	Snatch (kg)				Clean & Jerk (kg)				Total	Rank
Year	Venue	Weight	1	2	3	Rank	1	2	3	Rank	Total	Rank
World Championships
2009	Goyang, South Korea	77 kg	125	~~130~~	~~130~~	26	155	~~160~~	~~161~~	27	280	25
