= List of European Weightlifting Championships medalists =

This is a list of European Championships medalists in Weightlifting from 1997 to 2018. The list, in order to be complete, miss medalists between 1896 and 1996.

== Men ==
=== – 56 kg ===
Games	Gold	Silver	Bronze
1947 Helsinki			
1948 London			
1949 The Hague			
1950 Paris			
1951 Milan			
1952 Helsinki			
1953 Stockholm			
1954 Vienna			
1955 Munich			
1956 Helsinki			
1957 Katowice			
1958 Stockholm			
1959 Warsaw			
1960 Milan			
1961 Vienna			
1962 Budapest			
1963 Stockholm			
1964 Moscow			
1965 Sofia			
1966 Berlin			
1968 Leningrad			
1969 Warsaw			
1970 Szombathely			
1971 Sofia			
1972 Constanţa			
1973 Madrid			
1974 Verona			
1975 Moscow			
1976 Berlin			
1977 Stuttgart			
1978 Havířov			
1979 Varna			
1980 Belgrade			
1981 Lille			
1982 Ljubljana			
1983 Moscow			
1984 Vitoria			
1985 Katowice			
1986 Karl-Marx-Stadt			
1987 Reims			
1988 Cardiff			
1989 Athens			
1990 Ålborg			
1991 Władysławowo			
1992 Szekszárd			
1993–1997	not included in the program		
1998 Riesa	(Bulgaria) Ivan Ivanov	(Turkey) Sedat Artuç	(Bulgaria) Naiden Russev
1999 A Coruña	(Turkey) Halil Mutlu	(Romania) Adrian Jigău	(Bulgaria) Ivan Ivanov
2000 Sofia	(Turkey) Halil Mutlu	(Bulgaria) Ivan Ivanov	(Romania) Adrian Jigau
2001 Trencin	(Turkey) Halil Mutlu	(Romania) Adrian Jigau	(Belarus) Vitaly Derbenev
2002 Antalya	(Belarus) Vitaly Derbenev	(Turkey) Sedat Artuç	(Moldova) Igor Grabucea
2003 Loutraki	(Belarus) Vitaly Derbenev	(Romania) Adrian Jigau	(Cyprus) Naiden Rusev
2004 Kyiv	(Turkey) Sedat Artuç	(Belarus) Vitali Dzerbianiou	(Hungary) László Tancsics
2005 Sofia	(Turkey) Sedat Artuç	(Turkey) Erol Bilgin	(Belarus) Vitali Dzerbianiou
2006 Władysławowo	(Belarus) Vitali Dzerbianiou	(Moldova) Igor Grabucea	(Hungary) László Tancsics
2007 Strasbourg	(Moldova) Igor Bour	(Belarus) Vitali Dzerbianiou	(Moldova) Igor Grabucea
2008 Lignano Sabbiadoro	(Turkey) Halil Mutlu	(Belgium) Tom Goegebuer	(Bulgaria) Vladimır Urumov
2009 Bucharest	(Belgium) Tom Goegebuer	(Italy) Vito Dellino	(Moldova) Igor Grabucea
2010 Minsk	(Belarus) Vitali Dzerbianiou	(Armenia) Smbat Margaryan	(Belgium) Tom Goegebuer
2011 Kazan	(Moldova) Oleg Sîrghi	(Turkey) Gökhan Kılıç	(Romania) Florin Ionuț Croitoru
2012 Antalya	(Azerbaijan) Valentin Hristov	(Moldova) Oleg Sîrghi	(Turkey) Gökhan Kılıç
2013 Tirana	(Moldova) Oleg Sirghi	(Bulgaria) Asen Muradov	(Belgium) Tom Goegebuer
2014 Tel Aviv	(Romania) Florin Croitoru	(Italy) Mirco Scarantino	(Armenia) Smbat Margaryan
2015 Tbilisi	(Moldova) Oleg Sirghi	(Armenia) Smbat Margaryan	(Italy) Mirco Scarantino
2016 Førde	(Italy) Mirco Scarantino	(Spain) Josué Brachi	(Romania) Ilie Constantin Ciotoiu
2017 Split	(Italy) Mirco Scarantino	(Moldova) Iuri Dudoglo	(Romania) Ilie Constantin Ciotoiu
2018 Bucharest	(Spain) Josue Brachi	(Italy) Mirco Scarantino	(Romania) Ilie Ciotoiu

=== – 62 kg ===
Games	Gold	Silver	Bronze
1998 Riesa	(Bulgaria) Stefan Georgiev	(Greece) Leonidas Sabanis	(Turkey) Mücahit Yağcı
1999 A Coruña	(Bulgaria) Sevdalin Minchev	(Greece) Leonidas Sabanis	(Croatia) Nikolaj Pešalov
2000 Sofia	(Croatia) Nikolaj Pešalov	(Bulgaria) Sevdalin Angelov	(Turkey) Naim Suleymanoglu
2001 Trencin	(Croatia) Nikolaj Pešalov	(Azerbaijan) Elkhan Suleymanov	(Moldova) Vladimir Popov
2002 Antalya	(Greece) Leonidas Sabanis	(Bulgaria) Stefan Georgiev	(Ukraine) Olexandr Lykhvald
2003 Loutraki	(Turkey) Halil Mutlu	(Bulgaria) Stefan Georgiev	(Belarus) Henadzi Aliashchuk
2004 Kyiv	(Bulgaria) Sevdalin Angelov	(Romania) Adrian Jigau	(Azerbaijan) Asif Malikov
2005 Sofia	(Turkey) Halil Mutlu	(Bulgaria) Sevdalin Minchev	(Romania) Adrian Jigău
2006 Władysławowo	(Russia) Dmitry Voronin	(Romania) Adrian Jigău	(Belarus) Henadzy Makhveyenia
2007 Strasbourg	(Russia) Sergey Petrosyan	(Belarus) Henadzy Makhveyenia	(Turkey) Erol Bilgin
2008 Lignano Sabbiadoro	(Russia) Sergey Petrosyan	(Turkey) Erol Bilgin	(Bulgaria) Stefan Georgiev
2009 Bucharest	(Turkey) Erol Bilgin	(Azerbaijan) Zulfugar Suleymanov	(Cyprus) Dimitris Minasidis
2010 Minsk	(Turkey) Erol Bilgin	(Romania) Antoniu Buci	(Azerbaijan) Zülfügar Süleymanov
2011 Kazan	(Turkey) Bünyamin Sezer	(Romania) Antoniu Buci	(Turkey) Hurşit Atak
2012 Antalya	(Turkey) Bünyamin Sezer	(Cyprus) Dimitris Minasidis	(Bulgaria) Stoyan Enev
2013 Tirana	(Moldova) Igor Bour	(Romania) Florin Croitoru	(Bulgaria) Stoyan Enev
2014 Tel Aviv	(Bulgaria) Ivaylo Filev	(Belarus) Stanislav Chadovich	(Bulgaria) Stoyan Enev
2015 Tbilisi	(Azerbaijan) Valentin Hristov	(Turkey) Bünyamin Sezer	(Romania) Florin Croitoru
2016 Førde	(Turkey) Hurşit Atak	(Russia) Feliks Khalibekov	(Bulgaria) Vladimir Urumov
2017 Split	(Turkey) Hurşit Atak	(Turkey) Bünyamin Sezer	(Russia) Feliks Khalibekov
2018 Bucharest	(Georgia (country)) Shota Mishvelidze	(Bulgaria) Stilyan Grozdev	(Romania) Ionut Ilie

=== – 69 kg ===
Games	Gold	Silver	Bronze
1998 Riesa	(Bulgaria) Plamen Jeliazkov	(Turkey) Ergün Batmaz	(Belarus) Sergey Lavrenov
1999 A Coruña	(Bulgaria) Galabin Boevski	(Bulgaria) Plamen Jeliazkov	(Greece) Valerios Leonidis
2000 Sofia	(Belarus) Sergei Lavrenov	(Bulgaria) Georgi Markov	(Turkey) Yasin Arslan
2001 Trencin	(Turkey) Ekrem Celil	(Russia) Andrey Matveev	(Azerbaijan) Turan Mirzayev
2002 Antalya	(Bulgaria) Galabin Boevski	(Greece) Giorgios Tzelilis	(Turkey) Reyhan Arabacioglu
2003 Loutraki	(Bulgaria) Galabin Boevski	(Azerbaijan) Turan Mirzayev	(Turkey) Ekrem Celil
2004 Kyiv	(Turkey) Ekrem Celil	(Croatia) Nikolaj Pešalov	(Belarus) Siarhei Laurenau
2005 Sofia	(Bulgaria) Demir Demirev	(Turkey) Ferit Sen	(Bulgaria) Mehmed Fikretov
2006 Władysławowo	(Belarus) Gennady Oleshchuk	(Bulgaria) Demir Demirev	(France) Vencelas Dabaya
2007 Strasbourg	(France) Vencelas Dabaya	(Armenia) Tigran G. Martirosyan	(Russia) Vladislav Lukanin
2008 Lignano Sabbiadoro	(Armenia) Tigran G. Martirosyan	(France) Vencelas Dabaya	(Bulgaria) Mehmed Fikretov
2009 Bucharest	(Armenia) Arakel Mirzoyan	(France) Vencelas Dabaya	(Russia) Vladislav Lukanin
2010 Minsk	(Romania) Ninel Miculescu	(Russia) Mikhail Gobeev	(Turkey) Mete Binay
2011 Kazan	(Russia) Vladislav Lukanin	(Romania) Răzvan Martin	(Albania) Daniel Godelli
2012 Antalya	(Russia) Oleg Chen	(Moldova) Serghei Cechir	(France) Venceslas Dabaya-Tientcheu
2013 Tirana	(Russia) Oleg Chen	(Albania) Daniel Godelli	(France) Bernardin Kingue Matam
2014 Tel Aviv	(Russia) Oleg Chen	(Armenia) Vanik Avetisyan	(Moldova) Serghei Cechir
2015 Tbilisi	(Turkey) Daniyar Ismayilov	(Russia) Sergei Petrov	(France) Bernardin Matam
2016 Førde	(Turkey) Daniyar Ismayilov	(Russia) Sergei Petrov	(Spain) David Sánchez López
2017 Split	(France) Bernardin Matam	(Russia) Oleg Chen	(Germany) Robert Joachim
2018 Bucharest	(Albania) Briken Calja	(Germany) Robert Joachim	(Spain) David Sanchez

=== – 77 kg ===
Games	Gold	Silver	Bronze
1998 Riesa	(Bulgaria) Vasil Vanev	(Georgia (country)) Giorgi Asanidze	(Armenia) Khachatur Kyapanaktsyan
1999 A Coruña	(Bulgaria) Petar Tanev	(Bulgaria) Georgi Markov	(Poland) Andrzej Kozlowski
2000 Sofia	(Bulgaria) Zlatan Vanev	(Bulgaria) Plamen Zhelyazkov	(Albania) Ilirian Suli
2001 Trencin	(Russia) Oleg Perepetchenov	(Armenia) Hovannes Amreyan	(Hungary) Attila Feri
2002 Antalya	(Bulgaria) Georgi Markov	(Bulgaria) Zlatan Vanev	(Turkey) Mehmet Yilmaz
2003 Loutraki	(Bulgaria) Georgi Markov	(Turkey) Reyhan Arabacioglu	(Poland) Andrzej Kozlowski
2004 Kyiv	(Turkey) Taner Sagir	(Turkey) Mehmet Yilmaz	(Bulgaria) Plamen Zhelyazkov
2005 Sofia	(Turkey) Taner Sağır	(Romania) Sebastian Dogariu	(Bulgaria) Ivan Stoitzov
2006 Władysławowo	(Armenia) Gevorg Davtyan	(Russia) Vladislav Lukanin	(Bulgaria) Georgi Markov
2007 Strasbourg	(Armenia) Gevorg Davtyan	(Armenia) Ara Khachatryan	(Turkey) Taner Sağır
2008 Lignano Sabbiadoro	(Russia) Oleg Perepetchenov	(Armenia) Ara Khachatryan	(Russia) Aleksey Yufkin
2009 Bucharest	(Belarus) Mikalai Cherniak	(Albania) Erkand Qerimaj	(Russia) Dmitry Ivanenko
2010 Minsk	(Armenia) Tigran G. Martirosyan	(Poland) Krzysztof Szramiak	(Belarus) Mikalai Cherniak
2011 Kazan	(Turkey) Semih Yağcı	(Armenia) Arayik Mirzoyan	(Romania) Alexandru Rosu
2012 Antalya	(Romania) Razvan Constantin Martin	(Moldova) Alexandru Dudoglo	(Moldova) Alexandru Spac
2013 Tirana	(Russia) Dmitry Khomyakov	(Romania) Paul Stoichiță	(Poland) Damian Kuczyński
2014 Tel Aviv	(Albania) Erkand Qerimaj	(Albania) Daniel Godelli	(Russia) Razmik Unanian
2015 Tbilisi	(Armenia) Tigran Gevorg Martirosyan	(Russia) Victor Getts	(Armenia) Andranik Karapetyan
2016 Førde	(Armenia) Andranik Karapetyan	(Armenia) Tigran Gevorg Martirosyan	(Romania) Dumitru Captari
2017 Split	(Romania) Dumitru Captari	(Romania) Răzvan Constantin Martin	(Albania) Erkand Qerimaj
2018 Bucharest	(Germany) Nico Muller	(Romania) Razvan Martin	(Spain) Andres Mata

=== – 85 kg ===
Games	Gold	Silver	Bronze
1998 Riesa	(Germany) Marc Huster	(Greece) Pyrros Dimas	(Turkey) Dursun Sevinç
1999 A Coruña	(Germany) Marc Huster	(Bulgaria) Georgi Gardev	(Turkey) Dursun Sevinc
2000 Sofia	(Georgia (country)) George Asanidze	(Bulgaria) Georgi Gardev	(Russia) Yuriy Myshkovets
2001 Trencin	(Georgia (country)) George Asanidze	(Bulgaria) Georgi Gardev	(Russia) Sergey Zhukov
2002 Antalya	(Georgia (country)) George Asanidze	(Poland) Mariusz Rytkowski	(Russia) Aslambek Ediev
2003 Loutraki	(Bulgaria) Zlatan Vanev	(Russia) Yuriy Myshkovets	(Russia) Rouslan Lizounov
2004 Kyiv	(Turkey) Izzet Ince	(Russia) Zaur Takhushev	(Turkey) Erdal Sunar
2005 Sofia	(Belarus) Ruslan Novikov	(Romania) Valeriu Calancea	(Armenia) Arsen Melikyan
2006 Władysławowo	(Belarus) Andrei Rybakou	(Russia) Yury Myshkovets	(Russia) Zaur Takhushev
2007 Strasbourg	(Romania) Valeriu Calancea	(Turkey) İzzet İnce	(Belarus) Vadzim Straltsou
2008 Lignano Sabbiadoro	(Armenia) Tigran V. Martirosyan	(Russia) Vasily Polovnikov	(Bulgaria) Georgi Markov
2009 Bucharest	(Russia) Alexey Yufkin	(Azerbaijan) Intiqam Zairov	(Belarus) Mikalai Novikau
2010 Minsk	(Armenia) Gevorik Poghosyan	(Armenia) Ara Khachatryan	(Belarus) Mikalai Novikau
2011 Kazan	(Russia) Aleksey Yufkin	(Russia) Apti Aukhadov	(France) Benjamin Hennequin
2012 Antalya	(Georgia (country)) Rauli Tsirekidze	(Turkey) Fatih Baydar	(Romania) Gabriel Sincraian
2013 Tirana	(Russia) Apti Aukhadov	(Bulgaria) Ivan Markov	(Russia) Albert Sayakhov
2014 Tel Aviv	(Bulgaria) Ivan Markov	(Russia) Adam Maligov	(France) Benjamin Hennequin
2015 Tbilisi	(France) Benjamin Hennequin	(Moldova) Alexandru Dudoglo	(Belarus) Mikalai Novikau
2016 Førde	(Ukraine) Oleksandr Pielieshenko	(Romania) Gabriel Sincraian	(Romania) Gheorghii Cernei
2017 Split	(Ukraine) Oleksandr Pielieshenko	(Russia) Artem Okulov	(Poland) Krzysztof Zwarycz
2018 Bucharest	(Georgia (country)) Revaz Davitadze	(Poland) Kasper Klos	(France) Bradon Vautard

=== – 94 kg ===
Games	Gold	Silver	Bronze
1998 Riesa	(Germany) Oliver Caruso	(Bulgaria) Ivan Chakarov	(Greece) Akakios Kakiasvilis
1999 A Coruña	(Poland) Szymon Kołecki	(Greece) Akakios Kakiasvilis	(Turkey) Bünyamin Sudaş
2000 Sofia	(Poland) Szymon Kolecki	(Moldova) Vadim Vacarciuc	(Turkey) Bunyami Sudas
2001 Trencin	(Azerbaijan) Nizami Pashayev	(Bulgaria) Nikola Stoyanov	(Armenia) Hakob Pilosyan
2002 Antalya	(Russia) Alexey Petrov	(Bulgaria) Milen Dobrev	(Azerbaijan) Nizami Pashayev
2003 Loutraki	(Bulgaria) Milen Dobrev	(Russia) Sergey Zhukov	(Poland) Tadeusz Drzazga
2004 Kyiv	(Bulgaria) Milen Dobrev	(Russia) Eduard Tjukin	(Ukraine) Anatoliy Mushyk
2005 Sofia	(Turkey) Hakan Yilmaz	(Russia) Andrey Skorobogatov	(Ukraine) Konstyantyn Pipiyev
2006 Władysławowo	(Poland) Szymon Kolecki	(Russia) Andrey Demanov	(Greece) Nikolas Kourtidis
2007 Strasbourg	(Poland) Szymon Kołecki	(Russia) Roman Konstantinov	(Moldova) Evgheni Bratan
2008 Lignano Sabbiadoro	(Poland) Szymon Kołecki	(Russia) Andrey Demanov	(Russia) Mukhamat Sozaev
2009 Bucharest	(Germany) Jürgen Spieß	(Greece) Nikos Kourtidis	(Russia) Andrey Demanov
2010 Minsk	(Poland) Arsen Kasabiev	(Azerbaijan) Rovshan Fatullayev	(Ukraine) Artem Ivanov
2011 Kazan	(Russia) Andrey Demanov	(Moldova) Anatolie Cîrîcu	(Lithuania) Aurimas Didžbalis
2012 Antalya	(Moldova) Anatoli Ciricu	(Lithuania) Aurimas Didzbalis	(Turkey) Ibrahim Arat
2013 Tirana	(Russia) Rinat Kireev	(Lithuania) Zygimantas Stanulis	(Belarus) Aliaksandr Makaranka
2014 Tel Aviv	(Poland) Adrian Zieliński	(Poland) Tomasz Zieliński	(Bulgaria) Vasil Gospodinov
2015 Tbilisi	(Lithuania) Aurimas Didžbalis	(Russia) Khetag Khugaev	(Belarus) Aliaksandr Venskel
2016 Førde	(Poland) Tomasz Zieliński	(Lithuania) Zygimantas Stanulis	(Russia) Georgii Kuptsov
2017 Split	(Russia) Adam Maligov	(Ukraine) Dmytro Chumak	(Lithuania) Aurimas Didžbalis
2018 Bucharest	(Romania) Nicolae Onica	(Lithuania) Zygimantas Stanulis	(Poland) Lukasz Grela

=== – 105 kg ===
Games	Gold	Silver	Bronze
1998 Riesa	(Russia) Viacheslav Ivanovski	(Russia) Yevgeni Chichliannikov	(Poland) Dariusz Osuch
1999 A Coruña	(Ukraine) Denys Hotfrid	(Poland) Mariusz Jedra	(Slovakia) Martin Tešovič
2000 Sofia	(Bulgaria) Metin Kadir	(Poland) Robert Dolega	(Russia) Evgeny Chichliannikov
2001 Trencin	(Russia) Evgeny Chigishev	(Poland) Szymon Kolecki	(Hungary) Zoltán Kovács
2002 Antalya	(Bulgaria) Alan Tsagaev	(Ukraine) Denys Gotfrid	(Turkey) Bunyami Sudas
2003 Loutraki	(Ukraine) Igor Razoronov	(Bulgaria) Alan Tsagaev	(Russia) Vladimir Smortchkov
2004 Kyiv	(Bulgaria) Alan Tsagaev	(Russia) Dmitry Berestov	(Moldova) Alexandru Bratan
2005 Sofia	(Russia) Vladimir Smorchkov	(Turkey) Bünyamin Sudaş	(Lithuania) Ramūnas Vyšniauskas
2006 Władysławowo	(Poland) Marcin Dołęga	(Russia) Vladimir Smorchkov	(Moldova) Alexandru Bratan
2007 Strasbourg	(Slovakia) Martin Tešovič	(Russia) Gleb Pisarevskiy	(Russia) Dmitry Lapikov
2008 Lignano Sabbiadoro	(Russia) Dmitry Berestov	(Lithuania) Ramūnas Vyšniauskas	(Poland) Robert Dolega
2009 Bucharest	(Russia) Vladimir Smorchkov	(Ukraine) Oleksiy Torokhtiy	(Lithuania) Ramūnas Vyšniauskas
2010 Minsk	(Belarus) Andrei Aramnau	(Russia) Dmitry Klokov	(Russia) Vladimir Smorchkov
2011 Kazan	(Russia) Khadzhimurat Akkaev	(Georgia (country)) Gia Machavariani	(Poland) Bartlomiej Bonk
2012 Antalya	(Russia) David Bedzhanyan	(Russia) Maxim Sheyko	(Belarus) Mikhail Audzeyev
2013 Antalya	(Russia) David Bedzhanyan	(Russia) Maxim Sheyko	(Latvia) Arturs Plesnieks
2014 Tel Aviv	(Russia) Andrey Demanov	(Russia) Timur Naniev	(Belarus) Andrei Aramnau
2015 Tbilisi	(Poland) Bartłomiej Bonk	(Moldova) Andrian Zbirnea	(Poland) Arkadiusz Michalski
2016 Førde	(Latvia) Arturs Plesnieks	(Poland) Arkadiusz Michalski	(Armenia) Simon Martirosyan
2017 Split	(Armenia) Simon Martirosyan	(Bulgaria) Vasil Gospodinov	(Poland) Arkadiusz Michalski
2018 Bucharest	(Poland) Arkadiusz Michalski	(Bulgaria) Georgi Shikov	(Austria) Sargis Martirosjan

=== + 105 kg ===
Games	Gold	Silver	Bronze
1998 Riesa	(Germany) Ronny Weller	(Russia) Andrei Chemerkin	(Armenia) Ara Vardanyan
1999 A Coruña	(Armenia) Ashot Danielyan	(Germany) Ronny Weller	(Latvia) Viktors Ščerbatihs
2000 Sofia	(Armenia) Ashot Danielyan	(Germany) Ronny Weller	(Latvia) Viktors Ščerbatihs
2001 Trencin	(Latvia) Viktors Ščerbatihs	(Poland) Paweł Najdek	(Poland) Grzegorz Kleszcz
2002 Antalya	(Germany) Ronny Weller	(Poland) Paweł Najdek	(Ukraine) Oleksiy Kolokoltsev
2003 Loutraki	(Russia) Evgeny Chigishev	(Armenia) Ashot Danielyan	(Bulgaria) Damyan Damyanov
2004 Kyiv	(Bulgaria) Velichko Cholakov	(Latvia) Viktors Ščerbatihs	(Germany) Ronny Weller
2005 Sofia	(Latvia) Viktors Ščerbatihs	(Russia) Evgeny Chigishev	(Armenia) Ashot Danielyan
2006 Władysławowo	(Latvia) Viktors Ščerbatihs	(Bulgaria) Velichko Cholakov	(Poland) Paweł Najdek
2007 Strasbourg	(Latvia) Viktors Ščerbatihs	(Russia) Evgeny Chigishev	(Poland) Paweł Najdek
2008 Lignano Sabbiadoro	(Latvia) Viktors Ščerbatihs	(Germany) Matthias Steiner	(Russia) Evgeny Chigishev
2009 Bucharest	(Ukraine) Ihor Shymechko	(Germany) Almir Velagic	(Russia) Evgeny Pisarev
2010 Minsk	(Russia) Evgeny Chigishev	(Armenia) Ruben Aleksanyan	(Germany) Matthias Steiner
2011 Kazan	(Russia) Dmitry Lapikov	(Ukraine) Ihor Shymechko	(Turkey) Bunyamin Sudas
2012 Antalya	(Russia) Ruslan Albegov	(Germany) Matthias Steiner	(Georgia (country)) Irakli Turmanidze
2013 Tirana	(Russia) Ruslan Albegov	(Ukraine) Artem Udachyn	(Czech Republic) Jiří Orság
2014 Tel-Aviv	(Russia) Aleksey Lovchev	(Armenia) Ruben Aleksanyan	(Germany) Almir Velagic
2015 Tbilisi	(Georgia (country)) Irakli Turmanidze	(Russia) Chingiz Mogushkov	(Germany) Almir Velagić
2016 Førde	(Georgia (country)) Lasha Talakhadze	(Armenia) Gor Minasyan	(Estonia) Mart Seim
2017 Split	(Georgia (country)) Lasha Talakhadze	(Armenia) Gor Minasyan	(Armenia) Ruben Aleksanyan
2018 Bucharest	(Georgia (country)) Lasha Talakhadze	(Poland) Jiri Orsag	(Hungary) Peter Nagy

== Women ==
=== – 48 kg ===
Games	Gold	Silver	Bronze
1998 Riesa	(Bulgaria) Donka Mincheva	(Bulgaria) Siyka Stoyeva	(Hungary) Aniko Ajkai
1999 A Coruña	(Bulgaria) Donka Mincheva	(Bulgaria) Siyka Stoyeva	(Spain) Gema Peris
2000 Sofia	(Bulgaria) Donka Mincheva	(Italy) Eva Giganti	(Ukraine) Olena Zinovyeva
2001 Trencin	(Spain) Gema Peris	(Russia) Snezhana Popova	(Spain) Maria Jose Tocino
2002 Antalya	(Ukraine) Olena Zinovyeva	(Russia) Svetlana Ulyanova	(Turkey) Nurcan Taylan
2003 Loutraki	(Russia) Svetlana Ulyanova	(Ukraine) Olena Zinovyeva	(Spain) Gema Peris
2004 Kyiv	(Bulgaria) Izabela Dragneva	(Russia) Svetlana Ulyanova	(Spain) Rebeca Sires Rodriguez
2005 Sofia	(Russia) Svetlana Ulyanova	(Spain) Rebecca Sires Rodrigez	(Bulgaria) Donka Mincheva
2006 Władysławowo	(Spain) Estefania Juan	(Russia) Svetlana Ulyanova	(Italy) Genny Pagliaro
2007 Strasbourg	(Spain) Estefania Juan	(Turkey) Nurcan Taylan	(Italy) Genny Pagliaro
2008 Lignano Sabbiadoro	(Turkey) Nurcan Taylan	(Turkey) Sibel Özkan	(Italy) Genny Pagliaro
2009 Bucharest	(Turkey) Nurcan Taylan	(Moldova) Cristina Iovu	(Poland) Marzena Karpińska
2010 Minsk	(Turkey) Nurcan Taylan	(Poland) Marzena Karpińska	(Turkey) Şaziye Okur
2011 Kazan	(Turkey) Nurcan Taylan	(Turkey) Nurdan Karagöz	(Italy) Genny Pagliaro
2012 Antalya	(Poland) Marzena Karpińska	(Turkey) Nurdan Karagöz	(Azerbaijan) Silviya Angelova
2013 Tirana	(Italy) Genny Pagliaro	(Azerbaijan) Silviya Angelova	(Romania) Elena Andrieș
2014 Tel Aviv	(Italy) Genny Pagliaro	(Poland) Marzena Karpińska	(Turkey) Nurcan Taylan
2015 Tbilisi	(Turkey) Sibel Özkan	(Turkey) Nurcan Taylan	(Italy) Genny Pagliaro
2016 Førde	(Turkey) Sibel Özkan	(Italy) Genny Pagliaro	(Romania) Monica Suneta Csengeri
2017 Split	(France) Anais Michel	(Romania) Monica Suneta Csengeri	(Romania) Elena Ramona Andries

=== – 53 kg ===
Games	Gold	Silver	Bronze
1998 Riesa	(Bulgaria) Izabela Dragneva	(Slovakia) Dagmar Deneková	(Greece) Anna Stroubou
1999 A Coruña	(Bulgaria) Izabela Dragneva	(Spain) Estefanía Juan	(Spain) Rebeca Sires
2000 Sofia	(Bulgaria) Izabela Dragneva	(Spain) Estefanía Juan	(Bulgaria) Siyka Stoyeva
2001 Trencin	(Turkey) Emine Bilgin	(Slovakia) Dagmar Danekova	(Spain) Estefanía Juan
2002 Antalya	(Turkey) Aylin Dasdelen	(Turkey) Emine Bilgin	(Hungary) Anikó Ajkay
2003 Loutraki	(Turkey) Nurcan Taylan	(Bulgaria) Izabela Dragneva	(Romania) Marioara Munteanu
2004 Kyiv	(Turkey) Nurcan Taylan	(Romania) Marioara Munteanu	(Belarus) Nastassia Novikava
2005 Sofia	(Belarus) Nastassia Novikava	(Romania) Marioara Munteanu	(Ukraine) Nataliya Trotsenko
2006 Władysławowo	(Romania) Marioara Munteanu	(Ukraine) Nataliya Trotsenko	(France) Virginie Lachaume
2007 Strasbourg	(Romania) Marioara Munteanu	(Ukraine) Nataliya Trotsenko	(Russia) Svetlana Ulyanova
2008 Lignano Sabbiadoro	(Ukraine) Nataliya Trotsenko	(Spain) María de la Puente	(Germany) Julia Rohde
2009 Bucharest	(Ukraine) Nataliya Trotsenko	(Turkey) Aylin Daşdelen	(Turkey) Emine Bilgin
2010 Minsk	(Turkey) Aylin Daşdelen	(Bulgaria) Boyanka Kostova	(Belarus) Valiantsi Liakhavets
2011 Kazan	(Turkey) Aylin Daşdelen	(Germany) Julia Rohde	(Turkey) Ayşegül Çoban
2012 Antalya	(Moldova) Cristina Iovu	(Turkey) Aylin Daşdelen	(Russia) Svetlana Cheremshanova
2013 Tirana	(Ukraine) Iulia Paratova	(Russia) Svetlana Cheremshanova	(Bulgaria) Maya Ivanova
2014 Tel Aviv	(Turkey) Ayşegül Çoban	(Ukraine) Iulia Paratova	(Bulgaria) Maya Ivanova
2015 Tbilisi	(Ukraine) Iulia Paratova	(Germany) Julia Schwarzbach	(Turkey) Ayşegül Çoban
2016 Førde	(Romania) Cristina Iovu	(Ukraine) Iulia Paratova	(Latvia) Rebeka Koha
2017 Split	(Poland) Joanna Łochowska	(Spain) Atenery Hernández	(Belarus) Liudmila Pankova

=== – 58 kg ===
Games	Gold	Silver	Bronze
1998 Riesa	(Bulgaria) Neli Simova	(Poland) Dominika Misterska	(Greece) Maria Christoforidou
1999 A Coruña	(Bulgaria) Neli Simova	(France) Ingrid Fevre	(Poland) Marieta Gotfryd
2000 Sofia	(Bulgaria) Neli Yankova	(Poland) Aleksandra Klejnowska	(Ukraine) Nataliya Skakun
2001 Trencin	(Poland) Aleksandra Klejnowska	(Poland) Marieta Gotfryd	(Turkey) Dondu Ay
2002 Antalya	(Poland) Aleksandra Klejnowska	(Bulgaria) Neli Yankova	(Hungary) Henrietta Ráki
2003 Loutraki	(Turkey) Aylin Dasdelen	(Turkey) Emine Bilgin	(United Kingdom) Michaela Breeze
2004 Kyiv	(Poland) Aleksandra Klejnowska	(Turkey) Aylin Dasdelen	(Bulgaria) Zlatina Atanasova
2005 Sofia	(Russia) Marina Shainova	(Poland) Aleksandra Klejnowska	(Poland) Marieta Gotfryd
2006 Władysławowo	(Russia) Marina Shainova	(Albania) Fetie Kasaj	(Poland) Aleksandra Klejnowska
2007 Strasbourg	(Russia) Marina Shainova	(Norway) Ruth Kasirye	(Poland) Aleksandra Klejnowska
2008 Lignano Sabbiadoro	(Poland) Aleksandra Klejnowska	(Albania) Romela Begaj	(Romania) Roxana Cocos
2009 Bucharest	(Belarus) Nastassia Novikava	(Ukraine) Yuliya Kalina	(Albania) Romela Begaj
2010 Minsk	(Belarus) Nastassia Novikava	(Albania) Romela Begaj	(Poland) Marieta Gotfryd
2011 Kazan	(Belarus) Nastassia Novikava	(Poland) Aleksandra Klejnowska	(Turkey) Bediha Tunadagi
2012 Antalya	(Azerbaijan) Boyanka Kostova	(Poland) Aleksandra Klejnowska	(Russia) Yelena Shadrina
2013 Tirana	(Belarus) Alena Chychkan	(Romania) Loredana Elena Toma	(Albania) Romela Begaj
2014 Tel Aviv	(Russia) Elena Shadrina	(Romania) Loredana Elena Toma	(United Kingdom) Zoe Smith
2015 Tbilisi	(Azerbaijan) Boyanka Kostova	(Romania) Irina Lepsa Lacramioara	(Poland) Aleksandra Klejnowska
2016 Førde	(Azerbaijan) Boyanka Kostova	(Romania) Irina Lepsa Lacramioara	(Poland) Joanna Łochowska
2017 Split	(Russia) Natalia Khlestkina	(Latvia) Rebeka Koha	(Romania) Mădălina Bianca Molie

=== – 63 kg ===
Games	Gold	Silver	Bronze
1998 Riesa	(Bulgaria) Gergana Kirilova	(Russia) Valentina Popova	(Spain) Josefa Pérez
1999 A Coruña	(Russia) Valentina Popova	(Greece) Ioanna Khatziioannou	(Bulgaria) Gergana Kirilova
2000 Sofia	(Russia) Valentina Popova	(Spain) Josefa Pérez	(Czech Republic) Veronika Buronova
2001 Trencin	(Russia) Valentina Popova	(Poland) Dominika Misterska	(Ukraine) Nataliya Skakun
2002 Antalya	(Ukraine) Nataliya Skakun	(Greece) Anastasia Tsakiri	(Bulgaria) Gergana Kirilova
2003 Loutraki	(Greece) Anastasia Tsakiri	(Bulgaria) Gergana Kirilova	(Bulgaria) Zlatina Atanasova
2004 Kyiv	(Bulgaria) Gergana Kirilova	(Poland) Dominika Misterska	(Greece) Anastasia Tsakiri
2005 Sofia	(Russia) Svetlana Shimkova	(Poland) Dominika Misterska	(Bulgaria) Gergana Kirilova
2006 Władysławowo	(Russia) Svetlana Shimkova	(Belarus) Hanna Batsiushka	(Ukraine) Vanda Maslovska
2007 Strasbourg	(Armenia) Meline Daluzyan	(Turkey) Sibel Şimşek	(Belarus) Hanna Batsiushka
2008 Lignano Sabbiadoro	(Armenia) Meline Daluzyan	(Turkey) Sibel Şimşek	(Bulgaria) Milka Maneva
2009 Bucharest	(Turkey) Sibel Şimşek	(Norway) Ruth Kasirye	(Russia) Svetlana Tsarukaeva
2010 Minsk	(Turkey) Sibel Şimşek	(Russia) Svetlana Tsarukaeva	(Romania) Roxana Cocos
2011 Kazan	(Russia) Marina Shainova	(Russia) Svetlana Tsarukaeva	(Turkey) Sibel Şimşek
2012 Antalya	(Turkey) Sibel Şimşek	(Hungary) Nikoletta Nagy	(Turkey) Neslihan Okumuş
2013 Tirana	(Bulgaria) Milka Maneva	(Romania) Irina Lepsa	(Poland) Anna Leśniewska
2014 Tel Aviv	(Russia) Tima Turieva	(Russia) Nadezda Lomova	(Ukraine) Yuliya Kalina
2015 Tbilisi	(Ukraine) Yuliya Kalina	(Russia) Nadezda Likhacheva	(Italy) Giorgia Bordignon
2016 Førde	(Russia) Natalia Khlestkina	(Russia) Diana Akhmetova	(Italy) Giorgia Bordignon
2017 Split	(Romania) Loredana Elena Toma	(Russia) Tatiana Aleeva	(Russia) Tima Turieva

=== – 69 kg ===
Games	Gold	Silver	Bronze
1998 Riesa	(Hungary) Erzsébet Márkus	(Russia) Svetlana Kabirova	(Poland) Beata Prej
1999 A Coruña	(Bulgaria) Milena Trendafilova	(Russia) Irina Kasimova	(Poland) Beata Prej
2000 Sofia	(Bulgaria) Milena Trendafilova	(Bulgaria) Daniela Kerkelova	(Russia) Irina Kasimova
2001 Trencin	(Ukraine) Vanda Maslovska	(Bulgaria) Milena Trendafilova	(Greece) Kleanthi Milona
2002 Antalya	(Russia) Valentina Popova	(Russia) Svetlana Khabirova	(Greece) Maria Tatsi
2003 Loutraki	(Russia) Valentina Popova	(Bulgaria) Milena Trendafilova	(Russia) Zarema Kasaeva
2004 Kyiv	(Turkey) Sibel Simsek	(Russia) Tatiana Matveeva	(Ukraine) Vanda Maslovska
2005 Sofia	(Russia) Zarema Kasayeva	(Russia) Olga Kiseleva	(Ukraine) Natalya Davydova
2006 Władysławowo	(Russia) Tatiana Matveeva	(Ukraine) Natalya Davydova	(Poland) Dominika Misterska
2007 Strasbourg	(Russia) Oxana Slivenko	(Armenia) Nazik Avdalyan	(Ukraine) Natalya Davydova
2008 Lignano Sabbiadoro	(Armenia) Nazik Avdalyan	(Russia) Tatiana Matveeva	(Bulgaria) Slaveyka Ruzhinska
2009 Bucharest	(Russia) Oxana Slivenko	(Armenia) Nazik Avdalyan	(Russia) Tatiana Matveeva
2010 Minsk	(Russia) Oxana Slivenko	(Armenia) Meline Daluzyan	(Belarus) Shemshat Tuliayeva
2011 Minsk	(Russia) Oxana Slivenko	(Russia) Tatiana Matveeva	(Hungary) Eszter Krutzler
2012 Antalya	(Russia) Oxana Slivenko	(Romania) Roxana Cocoș	(Russia) Viktoriya Savenko
2013 Tirana	(Russia) Oxana Slivenko	(Belarus) Dzina Sazanavets	(Ukraine) Nadiya Myronuk
2014 Tel Aviv	(Belarus) Dzina Sazanavets	(Bulgaria) Milka Maneva	(Ukraine) Nadiya Myronuk
2015 Tbilisi	(Belarus) Dzina Sazanavets	(Russia) Iana Kondrashova	(Azerbaijan) Anastassiya Ibrahimli
2016 Førde	(Armenia) Nazik Avdalyan	(Belarus) Darya Pachabut	(United Kingdom) Rebekah Tiler
2017 Split	(Russia) Anastasiia Romanova	(Ukraine) Mariya Khlyan	(Belarus) Anastasiya Mikhalenka

=== – 75 kg ===
Games	Gold	Silver	Bronze
1998 Riesa	(Hungary) Mária Takács	(Hungary) Ilona Danko	(Spain) Mónica Carrio
1999 A Coruña	(Czech Republic) Radomíra Ševčíková	(Turkey) Şule Şahbaz	(Finland) Karoliina Lundahl
2000 Sofia	(Russia) Svetlana Khabirova	(Russia) Venera Mannanova	(Poland) Beata Prei
2001 Trencin	(Hungary) Gyöngyi Likerecz	(Hungary) Ilona Dankó	(Finland) Karoliina Lundahl
2002 Antalya	(Turkey) Sule Sahbaz	(Turkey) Aysel Özgür	(Hungary) Ilona Dankó
2003 Loutraki	(Russia) Natalya Zabolotnaya	(Bulgaria) Rumiana Petkova	(Greece) Christina Ioannidi
2004 Kyiv	(Russia) Svetlana Podobedova	(Turkey) Sule Sahbaz	(Greece) Christina Ioannidi
2005 Sofia	(Russia) Svetlana Podobedova	(Russia) Valentina Popova	(Bulgaria) Rumyana Petkova
2006 Władysławowo	(Russia) Natalya Zabolotnaya	(Russia) Valentina Popova	(Armenia) Hripsime Khurshudyan
2007 Strasbourg	(Armenia) Hripsime Khurshudyan	(Russia) Tatiana Matveeva	(Spain) Lydia Valentín
2008 Lignano Sabbiadoro	(Russia) Natalya Zabolotnaya	(Spain) Lydia Valentín	(Germany) Yvonne Kranz
2009 Bucharest	(Russia) Natalya Zabolotnaya	(Armenia) Hripsime Khurshudyan	(Spain) Lydia Valentín
2010 Minsk	(Russia) Natalya Zabolotnaya	(Russia) Nadezhda Evstyukhina	(Armenia) Hripsime Khurshudyan
2011 Kazan	(Russia) Nadezhda Evstyukhina	(Russia) Natalya Zabolotnaya	(Spain) Lydia Valentín
2012 Antalya	(Russia) Olga Zubova	(Spain) Lydia Valentín	(Turkey) Hatice Yılmaz
2013 Tirana	(Russia) Nadezhda Yevstyukhina	(Spain) Lydia Valentín	(Russia) Anastasiia Romanova
2014 Tel Aviv	(Spain) Lydia Valentín	(Russia) Oxana Karpunenko	(Poland) Ewa Mizdal
2015 Tbilisi	(Spain) Lydia Valentín	(France) Gaëlle Nayo-Ketchanke	(Belarus) Darya Pachabut
2016 Førde	(Ukraine) Iryna Dekha	(France) Gaëlle Nayo-Ketchanke	(Moldova) Natalia Priscepa
2017 Split	(Spain) Lydia Valentín	(Russia) Mariia Vostrikova	(Armenia) Sona Poghosyan

=== – 90 kg ===
Games	Gold	Silver	Bronze
2017 Split	(Russia) Diana Mstieva	(Ukraine) Valentyna Kisil	(Armenia) Tatev Hakobyan

=== + 90 kg ===
Games	Gold	Silver	Bronze
2017 Split	(Russia) Tatiana Kashirina	(Ukraine) Anastasiya Lysenko	(Hungary) Krisztina Magát

== Discounted events ==
=== Men ===
==== – 52 kg ====
Games	Gold	Silver	Bronze
1969 Warsaw			
1970 Szombathely			
1971 Sofia			
1972 Constanţa			
1973 Madrid			
1974 Verona			
1975 Moscow			
1976 Berlin			
1977 Stuttgart			
1978 Havířov			
1979 Varna			
1980 Belgrade			
1981 Lille			
1982 Ljubljana			
1983 Moscow			
1984 Vitoria			
1985 Katowice			
1986 Karl-Marx-Stadt			
1987 Reims			
1988 Cardiff			
1989 Athens			
1990 Ålborg			
1991 Władysławowo			
1992 Szekszárd			

==== – 54 kg ====
Games	Gold	Silver	Bronze
1993 Sofia	(Bulgaria) Ivan Ivanov	(Bulgaria) Sevdalin Angelov	(Russia) Nikolay Petukhov
1994 Sokolov	(Turkey) Halil Mutlu	(Bulgaria) Sevdalin Angelov	(Greece) Iakovos Polanidis
1995 Warsaw	(Turkey) Halil Mutlu	(Bulgaria) Ivan Ivanov	(Bulgaria) Stefan Grigoryev
1996 Stavanger	(Turkey) Halil Mutlu	(Bulgaria) Stefan Grigoryev	(Romania) Traian Ciharean
1997 Rijeka	(Turkey) Halil Mutlu	(Bulgaria) Sevdalin Angelov	(Russia) Mikhail Sevchenko

==== – 59 kg ====
Games	Gold	Silver	Bronze
1993 Sofia	(Bulgaria) Nikolay Peshalov	(Turkey) Hafız Süleymanoğlu	(Ukraine) Albert Nassibullin
1994 Sokolov	(Bulgaria) Nikolay Peshalov	(Bulgaria) Radostin Panayotov	(Greece) Georgios Tzelilis
1995 Warsaw	(Bulgaria) Nikolay Peshalov	(Bulgaria) Sevdalin Angelov	(Turkey) Hafız Süleymanoğlu
1996 Stavanger	(Greece) Leonidas Sabanis	(Bulgaria) Sevdalin Angelov	(Romania) Marius Ciharean
1997 Rijeka	(Bulgaria) Nikolay Peshalov	(Greece) Leonidas Sabanis	(Bulgaria) Stefan Georgiev

==== – 60 kg ====
Games	Gold	Silver	Bronze
1914 Vienna			
1921 Offenbach			
1924 Neunkirchen			
1929 Vienna			
1930 Munich			
1931 Luxembourg			
1933 Essen			
1934 Genoa			
1935 Paris			
1947 Helsinki			
1948 London			
1949 The Hague			
1950 Paris			
1951 Milan			
1952 Helsinki			
1953 Stockholm			
1954 Vienna			
1955 Munich			
1956 Helsinki			
1957 Katowice			
1958 Stockholm			
1959 Warsaw			
1960 Milan			
1961 Vienna			
1962 Budapest			
1963 Stockholm			
1964 Moscow			
1965 Sofia			
1966 Berlin			
1968 Leningrad			
1969 Warsaw			
1970 Szombathely			
1971 Sofia			
1972 Constanţa			
1973 Madrid			
1974 Verona			
1975 Moscow			
1976 Berlin			
1977 Stuttgart			
1978 Havířov			
1979 Varna			
1980 Belgrade			
1981 Lille			
1982 Ljubljana			
1983 Moscow			
1984 Vitoria			
1985 Katowice			
1986 Karl-Marx-Stadt			
1987 Reims			
1988 Cardiff			
1989 Athens			
1990 Ålborg			
1991 Władysławowo			
1992 Szekszárd			

==== – 62.5 kg ====
Games	Gold	Silver	Bronze
1909 Dresden	Moritz Becker	Max Seyfert	Adolf Welz
1910–1911	not included in the program		
1912 Vienna	Emil Kliment	Gustav Kubu	Rudolf Tamme
1913 Brno	Emil Kliment	Jozef Wecht	Hugo Gold

==== – 64 kg ====
Games	Gold	Silver	Bronze
1993 Sofia	(Hungary) Attila Czanka	(Greece) Valerios Leonidis	(Bulgaria) Radostin Dimitrov
1994 Sokolov	(Turkey) Naim Suleymanoglu	(Greece) Valerios Leonidis	(Bulgaria) Ilian Tsankov
1995 Warsaw	(Turkey) Naim Suleymanoglu	(Greece) Valerios Leonidis	(Bulgaria) Petar Petrov
1996 Stavanger	(Greece) Valerios Leonidis	(Bulgaria) Petar Petrov	(Bulgaria) Ilian Iliev II
1997 Rijeka	(Turkey) Hafız Süleymanoğlu	(Hungary) Zoltán Farkas	(Romania) Marian-Nicolae Dodita

==== – 67.5 kg ====
Games	Gold	Silver	Bronze
1914 Vienna			
1921 Offenbach			
1924 Neunkirchen			
1929 Vienna			
1930 Munich			
1931 Luxembourg			
1933 Essen			
1934 Genoa			
1935 Paris			
1947 Helsinki			
1948 London			
1949 The Hague			
1950 Paris			
1951 Milan			
1952 Helsinki			
1953 Stockholm			
1954 Vienna			
1955 Munich			
1956 Helsinki			
1957 Katowice			
1958 Stockholm			
1959 Warsaw			
1960 Milan			
1961 Vienna			
1962 Budapest			
1963 Stockholm			
1964 Moscow			
1965 Sofia			
1966 Berlin			
1968 Leningrad			
1969 Warsaw			
1970 Szombathely			
1971 Sofia			
1972 Constanţa			
1973 Madrid			
1974 Verona			
1975 Moscow			
1976 Berlin			
1977 Stuttgart			
1978 Havířov			
1979 Varna			
1980 Belgrade			
1981 Lille			
1982 Ljubljana			
1983 Moscow			
1984 Vitoria			
1985 Katowice			
1986 Karl-Marx-Stadt			
1987 Reims			
1988 Cardiff			
1989 Athens			
1990 Ålborg			
1991 Władysławowo			
1992 Szekszárd			

==== – 70 kg ====
Games	Gold	Silver	Bronze
1909 Dresden	Rudolf Gross	Max Kempe	Kurt Dininger
1910–1911	not included in the program		
1912 Vienna	Josef Kammerer	Franz Zuba	Karl Hübner
1913–1992	not included in the program		
1993 Sofia	(Bulgaria) Yoto Yotov	(Poland) Waldemar Kosiński	(Russia) Ramzan Musayev
1994 Sokolov	(Bulgaria) Yoto Yotov	(Turkey) Fedail Guler	(Turkey) Ergun Batmaz
1995 Warsaw	(Turkey) Fedail Guler	(Poland) Waldemar Kosiński	(Hungary) Attila Feri
1996 Stavanger	(Bulgaria) Zlatan Vanev	(Bulgaria) Plamen Zhelyazkov	(Turkey) Ergün Batmaz
1997 Rijeka	(Turkey) Ergun Batmaz	(Bulgaria) Zlatan Vanev	(Bulgaria) Plamen Zhelyazkov

==== – 72.5 kg ====
Games	Gold	Silver	Bronze
1913 Brno	Franz Zuba	Karl Swoboda II	Jiri Bailei

==== – 75 kg ====
Games	Gold	Silver	Bronze
1914 Vienna			
1921 Offenbach			
1924 Neunkirchen			
1929 Vienna			
1930 Munich			
1931 Luxembourg			
1933 Essen			
1934 Genoa			
1935 Paris			
1947 Helsinki			
1948 London			
1949 The Hague			
1950 Paris			
1951 Milan			
1952 Helsinki			
1953 Stockholm			
1954 Vienna			
1955 Munich			
1956 Helsinki			
1957 Katowice			
1958 Stockholm			
1959 Warsaw			
1960 Milan			
1961 Vienna			
1962 Budapest			
1963 Stockholm			
1964 Moscow			
1965 Sofia			
1966 Berlin			
1968 Leningrad			
1969 Warsaw			
1970 Szombathely			
1971 Sofia			
1972 Constanţa			
1973 Madrid			
1974 Verona			
1975 Moscow			
1976 Berlin			
1977 Stuttgart			
1978 Havířov			
1979 Varna			
1980 Belgrade			
1981 Lille			
1982 Ljubljana			
1983 Moscow			
1984 Vitoria			
1985 Katowice			
1986 Karl-Marx-Stadt			
1987 Reims			
1988 Cardiff			
1989 Athens			
1990 Ålborg			
1991 Władysławowo			
1992 Szekszárd			

==== – 76 kg ====
Games	Gold	Silver	Bronze
1993 Sofia	(Armenia) Khachatur Kyapanaktsyan	(Belarus) Oleg Kechko	(Poland) Andrzej Kozłowski
1994 Sokolov	(Ukraine) Ruslan Savchenko	(Armenia) Khachatur Kyapanaktsyan	(Ukraine) Roman Sevasteev
1995 Warsaw	(Poland) Andrzej Kozłowski	(Armenia) Khachatur Kyapanaktsyan	(Armenia) Hovhannes Barseghyan
1996 Stavanger	(Poland) Waldemar Kosinski	(Russia) Sergey Filimonov	(Greece) Victor Mitrou
1997 Rijeka	(Bulgaria) Yoto Yotov	(Germany) Ingo Steinhoefel	(Ukraine) Ruslan Savchenko

==== – 80 kg ====
Games	Gold	Silver	Bronze
1907 Vienna	Habsburg Monarchy	German Empire	
1908 Malmö			
1909 Dresden			
1910 Budapest			
1911 Leipzig			
1912 Vienna			

==== + 80 kg ====
Games	Gold	Silver	Bronze
1907 Vienna			
1908 Malmö			
1909 Dresden			
1910 Budapest			
1911 Leipzig			
1912 Vienna			

==== – 82.5 kg ====
Games	Gold	Silver	Bronze
1913 Brno			
1914 Vienna			
1921 Offenbach			
1924 Neunkirchen			
1929 Vienna			
1930 Munich			
1931 Luxembourg			
1933 Essen			
1934 Genoa			
1935 Paris			
1947 Helsinki			
1948 London			
1949 The Hague			
1950 Paris			
1951 Milan			
1952 Helsinki			
1953 Stockholm			
1954 Vienna			
1955 Munich			
1956 Helsinki			
1957 Katowice			
1958 Stockholm			
1959 Warsaw			
1960 Milan			
1961 Vienna			
1962 Budapest			
1963 Stockholm			
1964 Moscow			
1965 Sofia			
1966 Berlin			
1968 Leningrad			
1969 Warsaw			
1970 Szombathely			
1971 Sofia			
1972 Constanţa			
1973 Madrid			
1974 Verona			
1975 Moscow			
1976 Berlin			
1977 Stuttgart			
1978 Havířov			
1979 Varna			
1980 Belgrade			
1981 Lille			
1982 Ljubljana			
1983 Moscow			
1984 Vitoria			
1985 Katowice			
1986 Karl-Marx-Stadt			
1987 Reims			
1988 Cardiff			
1989 Athens			
1990 Ålborg			
1991 Władysławowo			
1992 Szekszárd			

==== + 82.5 kg ====
Games	Gold	Silver	Bronze
1896 Rotterdam			
1897 Vienna			
1898 Amsterdam			
1900 Rotterdam			
1901 Rotterdam			
1902 The Hague			
1903 Amsterdam			
1904 Amsterdam			
1905 The Hague			
1906 Copenhagen			
1907 Vienna			
1908–1912	not included in the program		
1913 Brno			
1914 Vienna			
1921 Offenbach			
1924 Neunkirchen			
1929 Vienna			
1930 Munich			
1931 Luxembourg			
1933 Essen			
1934 Genoa			
1935 Paris			
1947 Helsinki			
1948 London			
1949 The Hague			
1950 Paris			

==== – 83 kg ====
Games	Gold	Silver	Bronze
1993 Sofia	(Ukraine) Oleksandr Blyshchyk	(Poland) Krzysztof Siemion	(Greece) Pyrros Dimas
1994 Sokolov	(Ukraine) Vadym Bazhan	(Ukraine) Oleksandr Blyshchyk	(Moldova) Vadim Vacarciuc
1995 Warsaw	(Greece) Pyrros Dimas	(Poland) Andrzej Cofalik	(Turkey) Dursun Sevinc
1996 Stavanger	(Russia) Yuriy Myshkovets	(Georgia (country)) Bidzina Mikiashvili	(Turkey) Dursun Sevinc
1997 Rijeka	(Germany) Marc Huster	(Turkey) Dursun Sevinc	(Russia) Yuriy Myshkovets

==== – 90 kg ====
Games	Gold	Silver	Bronze
1949 The Hague			
1950 Paris			
1951 Milan			
1952 Helsinki			
1953 Stockholm			
1954 Vienna			
1955 Munich			
1956 Helsinki			
1957 Katowice			
1958 Stockholm			
1959 Warsaw			
1960 Milan			
1961 Vienna			
1962 Budapest			
1963 Stockholm			
1964 Moscow			
1965 Sofia			
1966 Berlin			
1968 Leningrad			
1969 Warsaw			
1970 Szombathely			
1971 Sofia			
1972 Constanţa			
1973 Madrid			
1974 Verona			
1975 Moscow			
1976 Berlin			
1977 Stuttgart			
1978 Havířov			
1979 Varna			
1980 Belgrade			
1981 Lille			
1982 Ljubljana			
1983 Moscow			
1984 Vitoria			
1985 Katowice			
1986 Karl-Marx-Stadt			
1987 Reims			
1988 Cardiff			
1989 Athens			
1990 Ålborg			
1991 Władysławowo			
1992 Szekszárd			

==== – 91 kg ====
Games	Gold	Silver	Bronze
1993 Sofia	(Georgia (country)) Kakhi Kakhiashvili	(Poland) Sergiusz Wołczaniecki	(Bulgaria) Ivan Chakarov
1994 Sokolov	(Russia) Alexey Petrov	(Georgia (country)) Kakhi Kakhiashvili	(Bulgaria) Ivan Chakarov
1995 Warsaw	(Greece) Akakios Kakiasvilis	(Bulgaria) Plamen Bratoitchev	(Armenia) Aleksander Karapetyan
1996 Stavanger	(Turkey) Bulut Sunay	(Germany) Oliver Caruso	(Bulgaria) Plamen Bratoitchev
1997 Rijeka	(Turkey) Bulut Sunay	(Germany) Oliver Caruso	(Ukraine) Oleg Tchoumak

==== – 99 kg ====
Games	Gold	Silver	Bronze
1993 Sofia	(Russia) Vyacheslav Rubin	(Poland) Sławomir Zawada	(Belarus) Oleg Chiritso
1994 Sokolov	(Russia) Sergey Syrtsov	(Belarus) Oleg Chiritso	(Georgia (country)) Mukhran Gogia
1995 Warsaw	(Belarus) Oleg Chiritso	(Ukraine) Denys Hotfrid	(Poland) Krzysztof Zawadki
1996 Stavanger	(Greece) Akakios Kakiasvilis	(Russia) Dmitry Smirnov	(Israel) Vyacheslav Ivanovski
1997 Rijeka	(Ukraine) Stanislav Ribalchenko	(Russia) Dmitry Smirnov	(Slovakia) Martin Tesovic

==== – 100 kg ====
Games	Gold	Silver	Bronze
1969 Warsaw			
1970 Szombathely			
1971 Sofia			
1972 Constanţa			
1973 Madrid			
1974 Verona			
1975 Moscow			
1976 Berlin			
1977 Stuttgart			
1978 Havířov			
1979 Varna			
1980 Belgrade			
1981 Lille			
1982 Ljubljana			
1983 Moscow			
1984 Vitoria			
1985 Katowice			
1986 Karl-Marx-Stadt			
1987 Reims			
1988 Cardiff			
1989 Athens			
1990 Ålborg			
1991 Władysławowo			
1992 Szekszárd			

==== – 108 kg ====
Games	Gold	Silver	Bronze
1993 Sofia	(Ukraine) Timur Taymazov	(Germany) Ronny Weller	(Russia) Aleksandr Popov
1995 Sokolov	(Ukraine) Timur Taymazov	(Russia) Vadim Stasenko	(Ukraine) Ihor Razoronov
1996 Warsaw	(Russia) Sergey Syrtsov	(Poland) Dariusz Osuch	(Russia) Sergey Flerko
1996 Stavanger	(Russia) Evgeny Chichliannikov	(Romania) Nicu Vlad	(Belarus) Vladimir Yemelyanov
1997 Rijeka	(Ukraine) Denys Gotfrid	(Russia) Evgeny Chichliannikov	(Latvia) Viktors Ščerbatihs

==== + 108 kg ====
Games	Gold	Silver	Bronze
1993 Sofia	(Germany) Manfred Nerlinger	(Russia) Andrei Chemerkin	(Ukraine) Aleksander Levandovski
1995 Sokolov	(Russia) Andrei Chemerkin	(Ukraine) Serhiy Nahirnyi	(Russia) Artur Skripkin
1996 Warsaw	(Russia) Andrei Chemerkin	(Germany) Manfred Nerlinger	(Greece) Pavlos Saltsidis
1996 Stavanger	(Belarus) Leonid Taranenko	(Belarus) Alexey Krusevich	(Germany) Axel Franz
1997 Rijeka	(Hungary) Tibor Stark	(Latvia) Raimonds Bergmanis	(Norway) Stian Grimseth

==== – 110 kg ====
Games	Gold	Silver	Bronze
1969 Warsaw			
1970 Szombathely			
1971 Sofia			
1972 Constanţa			
1973 Madrid			
1974 Verona			
1975 Moscow			
1976 Berlin			
1977 Stuttgart			
1978 Havířov			
1979 Varna			
1980 Belgrade			
1981 Lille			
1982 Ljubljana			
1983 Moscow			
1984 Vitoria			
1985 Katowice			
1986 Karl-Marx-Stadt			
1987 Reims			
1988 Cardiff			
1989 Athens			
1990 Ålborg			
1991 Władysławowo			
1992 Szekszárd			

==== + 110 kg ====
Games	Gold	Silver	Bronze
1969 Warsaw			
1970 Szombathely			
1971 Sofia			
1972 Constanţa			
1973 Madrid			
1974 Verona			
1975 Moscow			
1976 Berlin			
1977 Stuttgart			
1978 Havířov			
1979 Varna			
1980 Belgrade			
1981 Lille			
1982 Ljubljana			
1983 Moscow			
1984 Vitoria			
1985 Katowice			
1986 Karl-Marx-Stadt			
1987 Reims			
1988 Cardiff			
1989 Athens			
1990 Ålborg			
1991 Władysławowo			
1992 Szekszárd			

=== Women ===
==== – 46 kg ====
Games	Gold	Silver	Bronze
1996 Prague	(Bulgaria) Donka Mincheva	(Spain) Estefania Juan	(Turkey) Esma Can
1997 Sevilla	(Spain) Estefania Juan	(Russia) Lyubov Averianova	(Bulgaria) Donka Mincheva

==== – 50 kg ====
Games	Gold	Silver	Bronze
1996 Prague	(Bulgaria) Izabela Dragneva	(Bulgaria) Silka Stoyeva	(Hungary) Csilla Földi
1997 Sevilla	(Turkey) Esma Can	(Bulgaria) Izabela Dragneva	(Spain) Rebeca Sires Rodriguez

==== – 54 kg ====
Games	Gold	Silver	Bronze
1996 Prague	(Turkey) Neshlian Demiroz	(Bulgaria) Neli Yankova	(Greece) Ioanna Chatzioannou
1997 Sevilla	(Bulgaria) Neli Yankova	(Turkey) Neshlian Demiroz	(Slovakia) Dagmar Danekova

==== – 59 kg ====
Games	Gold	Silver	Bronze
1996 Prague	(Turkey) Fatma Kabadayi	(Greece) Maria Christoforidou	(Turkey) Hatice Demiroz
1997 Sevilla	(Turkey) Fatma Kabadayi	(Greece) Maria Christoforidou	(Spain) Josefa Perez

==== – 64 kg ====
Games	Gold	Silver	Bronze
1996 Prague	(Bulgaria) Gergana Kirilova	(Greece) Ioanna Chatzioannou	(Russia) Tatyana Tesikova
1997 Sevilla	(Greece) Ioanna Chatzioannou	(Hungary) Erzsébet Márkus	(Russia) Tatyana Tesikova

==== – 70 kg ====
Games	Gold	Silver	Bronze
1996 Prague	(Turkey) Sule Sahbaz	(Turkey) Aysel Özgür	(Russia) Irina Kasimova
1997 Sevilla	(Turkey) Sule Sahbaz	(Russia) Irina Kasimova	(Hungary) Ilona Dankó

==== + 75 kg ====
Games	Gold	Silver	Bronze
1998 Riesa	(Germany) Monique Riesterer	(Hungary) Erika Takács	(Poland) Agata Wróbel
1999 A Coruña	(Poland) Agata Wróbel	(Russia) Albina Khomich	(Ukraine) Vita Rudenok
2000 Sofia	(Ukraine) Vita Rudenok	(Germany) Monique Riesterer	(Russia) Albina Khomich
2001 Trencin	(Russia) Albina Khomich	(Hungary) Viktória Varga	(Ukraine) Viktoriya Shaimardanova
2002 Antalya	(Poland) Agata Wróbel	(Hungary) Viktória Varga	(Russia) Albina Khomich
2003 Loutraki	(Russia) Albina Khomich	(Poland) Agata Wróbel	(Turkey) Derya Açıkgöz
2004 Kyiv	(Poland) Agata Wróbel	(Ukraine) Viktoriya Shaimardanova	(Turkey) Derya Açıkgöz
2005 Sofia	(Ukraine) Viktoriya Shaymardanova	(Ukraine) Yulia Dovgal	(Bulgaria) Yordanka Apostolova
2006 Władysławowo	(Ukraine) Olha Korobka	(Russia) Natalia Gagarina	(Bulgaria) Yordanka Apostolova
2007 Strasbourg	(Ukraine) Olha Korobka	(Belarus) Katsiaryna Shkuratava	(Ukraine) Yuliya Dovhal
2008 Lignano Sabbiadoro	(Ukraine) Olha Korobka	(Ukraine) Yuliya Dovhal	(Poland) Magdalena Ufnal
2009 Bucharest	(Russia) Tatiana Kashirina	(Russia) Natalia Gagarina	(Ukraine) Yuliya Dovhal
2010 Minsk	(Russia) Tatiana Kashirina	(Ukraine) Olha Korobka	(Belarus) Volha Kniazhyshcha
2011 Kazan	(Russia) Tatiana Kashirina	(Armenia) Hripsime Khurshudyan	(Turkey) Ümmühan Uçar
2012 Antalya	(Russia) Tatiana Kashirina	(Russia) Julia Konovalova	(Azerbaijan) Yuliya Dovhal
2013 Tirana	(Poland) Sabina Bagińska	(Ukraine) Ganna Kozenko	(Hungary) Krisztina Magat
2014 Tel Aviv	(Russia) Tatiana Kashirina	(Russia) Julia Konovalova	(Romania) Andreea Aanei
2015 Tbilisi	(Russia) Tatiana Kashirina	(Ukraine) Anastasiya Lysenko	(Romania) Andreea Aanei
2016 Førde	(Armenia) Hripsime Khurshudyan	(Georgia (country)) Anastasiia Hotfrid	(United Kingdom) Mercy Brown

==== – 76 kg ====
Games	Gold	Silver	Bronze
1996 Prague	(Hungary) Mária Takács	(Turkey) Derya Açıkgöz	(Greece) Panagiota Antonopoulou
1997 Sevilla	(Turkey) Aysel Özgür	(Hungary) Mária Takács	(Spain) Monica Carrio

==== – 83 kg ====
Games	Gold	Silver	Bronze
1996 Prague	(Russia) Albina Khomich	(Germany) Monique Riesterer	(Finland) Karolina Lundaahl
1997 Sevilla	(Turkey) Derya Açıkgöz	(Russia) Albina Khomich	(Germany) Monique Riesterer

==== + 83 kg ====
Games	Gold	Silver	Bronze
1996 Prague	(Turkey) Nurcihan Gonul	(France) Sylvia Iskin	(Hungary) Erika Takács
1997 Sevilla	(Turkey) Nurcihan Gonul	(Greece) Stamatia Bontozi	(Finland) Katarina Sederholm
