= 1996 European Weightlifting Championships =

International weightlifting competition

1996 European Championships

The 1996 European Weightlifting Championships were held in Stavanger, Norway for the men. The women competition were held in Prague, Czech Republic. It was the 75th edition of the men event, and the 9th for the women.

== Medal overview ==
=== Men ===
Event	Gold	Silver	Bronze
– 54 kg	(Turkey) Halil Mutlu	(Bulgaria) Stefan Georgiev	(Romania) Traian Ciharean
– 59 kg	(Greece) Leonidas Sabanis	(Bulgaria) Sevdalin Minchev	(Romania) Marius Ciharean
– 64 kg	(Greece) Valerios Leonidis	(Bulgaria) Petar Petrov	(Bulgaria) Ilian Iliev II
– 70 kg	(Bulgaria) Zlatan Vanev	(Bulgaria) Plamen Zhelyazkov	(Turkey) Ergün Batmaz
– 76 kg	(Poland) Waldemar Kosiński	(Russia) Sergey Filimonov	(Greece) Victor Mitrou
– 83 kg	(Russia) Yury Myshkovets	(Georgia (country)) Bidzina Mikiashvili	(Turkey) Dursun Sevinc
– 91 kg	(Turkey) Sunay Bulut	(Germany) Oliver Caruso	(Bulgaria) Plamen Bratoychev
– 99 kg	(Greece) Akakios Kakiasvilis	(Russia) Dmitry Smirnov	(Israel) Viacheslav Ivanovski
– 108 kg	(Russia) Evgeny Chichliannikov	(Romania) Nicu Vlad	(Belarus) Vladimir Yemelyanov
+ 108 kg	(Belarus) Leonid Taranenko	(Belarus) Alexey Krusevich	(Germany) Axel Franz

=== Women ===
Event	Gold	Silver	Bronze
– 46 kg	(Bulgaria) Donka Mincheva	(Spain) Estefania Juan	(Turkey) Esma Can
– 50 kg	(Bulgaria) Izabela Dragneva	(Bulgaria) Siyka Stoyeva	(Hungary) Csilla Földi
– 54 kg	(Turkey) Neslihan Demiroz	(Bulgaria) Neli Yankova	(Greece) Evdokia Chatziavramidou
– 59 kg	(Turkey) Fatma Kabadayi	(Greece) Maria Christoforidou	(Turkey) Hatice Demiroz
– 64 kg	(Bulgaria) Gergana Kirilova	(Greece) Ioanna Chatziioannou	(Russia) Tatyana Tesikova
– 70 kg	(Turkey) Sule Sahbaz	(Turkey) Aysel Özgür	(Russia) Irina Kasimova
– 76 kg	(Hungary) Mária Takács	(Turkey) Derya Açıkgöz	(Greece) Panagiota Antonopoulou
– 83 kg	(Russia) Albina Khomich	(Germany) Monique Riesterer	(Finland) Karoliina Lundahl
+ 83 kg	(Turkey) Nurcihan Gonul	(France) Sylvia Iskin	(Hungary) Erika Takacs
