= Derya Açıkgöz =

Turkish weightlifter (born 1977)

Personal information
- Nationality: Turkish
- Born: 11 May 1977 (age 49) Turkey

Sport
- Country: Turkey
- Sport: Weightlifting
- Events: -83 kg, -76 kg, +75 kg
Medal record
Women's Weightlifting
Representing Turkey
World Championships
Bronze medal – third place	1994 Istanbul	-83 kg
European Championships
Bronze medal – third place	2004 Kyiv	+75 kg
Bronze medal – third place	2003 Loutrak	+75 kg
Gold medal – first place	1997 Seville	-83 kg
Silver medal – second place	1996 Prague	-76 kg
Silver medal – second place	1994 Rome	-76 kg

Derya Açıkgöz (born 11 May 1977) is a Turkish former weightlifter competing in the -83 kg, -76 kg, and later in the +75 kg division. She is the first female weightlifter of her country to win a medal at a world championship.

== Career ==
At the age of 17, Açukgöz won bronze medals in the Snatch and Clean & Jerk events and in the total of the -83 kg division at the 1994 World Weightlifting Championships in Istanbul, Turkey. She became the first Turkish female weightlifter to win a medal at a world championship. The same year, she captured the gold medal at the 1994 European Women's Weightlifting Championships in Rome, Italy.

She won the silver medal in the +75 kg event at the 996 European Weightlifting Championships in Stavanger, Norway.

She set world records twice in a row in the -83 kg division at the 1997 European Junior and U23 Weightlifting Championships in Seville, Spain in the Snatch event with 110 kg and 115 kg as well as in the Clean & Jerk event with 137.5 kg and 142.5 kg.

She took the bronze medal in the +75 kg division at the 2003 European Weightlifting Championships in Loutraki, Greece. At the 2007 European Weightlifting Championships in Strasbourg, France, she won the silver medal in the Clean & Jerk event of the +75 kg division. She competed in the +75 kg division at the 2008 European Weightlifting Championships in Lignano Sabbiadoro, Italy, and ranked seventh in total.

She won the gold medal in the Clean & Jerk event of the +75 kg divisiın at the 2002 European Weightlifting Championships in Antalya, Turkey. She became world record holder for her lifting of 155 kg when Hripsime Khurshudyan's 2010-record was rescinded in 2020 following disqualification for banned drug use.

During her active sports life, she was a member of the ASKI SK in Ankara. After retiring from active weightlifting, she became jobless, and she had to make a living on her deceased father's pension. In May 2006, she started to work as a masseuse for national judokas at the Turkish Judo Federation.

== International record ==
World Championships
Year	Place	Division	Result		
Year	Place	Division	S	C&J	Total
1994	Turkey, Istanbul	-83 kg	3rd place, bronze medalist(s)	3rd place, bronze medalist(s)	3rd place, bronze medalist(s)
European Championships
1994	Italy, Rome	-76 kg	1st place, gold medalist(s)	3rd place, bronze medalist(s)	2nd place, silver medalist(s)
1996	Czech Republic, Prague	-76 kg	2nd place, silver medalist(s)	1st place, gold medalist(s)	2nd place, silver medalist(s)
1997	Spain, Seville	-83 kg	1st place, gold medalist(s)	1st place, gold medalist(s)	1st place, gold medalist(s)
2003	Greece, Loutraki	+75 kg	3rd place, bronze medalist(s)	3rd place, bronze medalist(s)	3rd place, bronze medalist(s)
2004	Ukraine, Kyiv	+75 kg	3rd place, bronze medalist(s)		3rd place, bronze medalist(s)
2007	France, Strasbourg	+75 kg		2nd place, silver medalist(s)	
Mediterranean Games
2001	Tunisia, Tunis	+75 kg		1st place, gold medalist(s)	

== Personal life ==
Açıkgöz was born on 11 May 1977. She studied in the Physical Education and Sports College at Ankara University, and graduated in 2004.

She married Osman Güngörmez in Ankara on 26 June 2010.
