= Igor Bour =

Moldovan weightlifter (born 1984)

Personal information
- Born: 18 December 1984 (age 41)
Medal record
Men's Weightlifting
Representing Moldova
European Championships
Gold medal – first place	2007 Strasbourg	– 56 kg
Disqualified	2008 Lignano	–56 kg
Disqualified	2013 Tirana	– 62 kg

Igor Bour, also known as Igor Lazăr or Igor Lazăr-Bour (born 18 December 1984) is a male weightlifter from Moldova. He is best known for winning the title at the 2007 European Championships in the men's – 56 kg division, defeating Vitali Dzerbianiou (second) and Igor Grabucea. At the 2008 European Championships he defeated Halil Mutlu and won gold medal with body weight, but later revealed he used metandienone. He gave 4-year ban. After he return, he won silver medal at the 2013 European Championships, but failed doping again. According to the IWF rules, after the second doping violation Bour was banned for life by the IWF.
