= Aleksandra Klejnowska =

Polish weightlifter (born 1982)

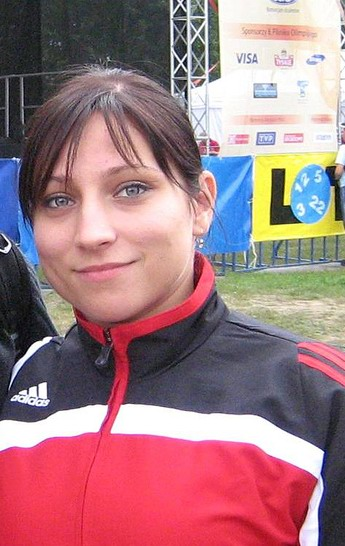

Personal information
- Full name: Aleksandra Jadwiga Klejnowska-Krzywanska
- Born: 17 December 1982 (age 43) Legnica, Poland
- Height: 1.56 m (5 ft 1 1/2 in)
- Weight: 53 kg (117 lb)

Sport
- Country: Poland
- Sport: Weightlifting
- Event: 53kg
- Coached by: Peter Wysocki
Medal record
Women's Weightlifting
Representing Poland
World Championships
Gold medal – first place	2001 Antalya	– 58 kg
European Championships
Gold medal – first place	2001 Trencin	– 58 kg
Gold medal – first place	2002 Antalya	– 58 kg
Gold medal – first place	2004 Kyiv	– 58 kg
Gold medal – first place	2008 Lignano Sabbiadoro	– 58 kg
Silver medal – second place	2000 Sofia	– 58 kg
Silver medal – second place	2005 Sofia	– 58 kg
Bronze medal – third place	2006 Władysławowo	– 58 kg
Bronze medal – third place	2007 Strasbourg	– 58 kg
Bronze medal – third place	2015 Tbilisi	– 58 kg
- Updated on 25 July 2012

Aleksandra Klejnowska-Krzywańska
- Allegiance: Polish Armed Forces
- Branch: Land Forces
- Rank: Private first class

Aleksandra Jadwiga Klejnowska-Krzywanska (born 17 December 1982 in Legnica) is a Polish weightlifter.

== Life and career ==
She was born in 1982 in Legnica. She represented Poland at the 2000 Summer Olympics, ranking fifth in the 58 kg category, with a total of 202.5 kg.

She became world champion in the 58 kg category at the 2001 World Championships, with a total of 215 kg.

On 11 April 2002 Aleksandra Klejnowska and Dominika Misterska failed a drug test carried out in training by the World Anti-Doping Agency. Both appealed, but the IWF Executive Board, decided on 17 November 2002 to suspend them for two years, even though there was evidence from the National Public Prosecutor's Office that the material was not doping.

After the suspension ended, during the 2004 Summer Olympics, she was ranked fifth in the 58 kg category, with a total of 220 kg.

She won a silver medal during the 2005 European Weightlifting Championships, and ranked second in the 58 kg category.

Klejnowska competed in the Women's 58 kg at the 2005 World Championships in Doha, Qatar but finished un-ranked because she missed all of her three snatch attempts.

In 2008, she won the European Championships in the 58 kg category, with a total of 212 kg.

At the 2008 Summer Olympics she ranked 5th in the 58 kg category, with a total of 215 kg.

At the 2012 Summer Olympics she ranked 5th in the 53 kg category, with a total of 196 kg.

She is serving in the Polish Armed Forces (Land branch) as a private first class since 2009.

== See also ==
- List of Poles
- Poland at the Olympics
