= 2002 World Weightlifting Championships – Men's 56 kg =

The 2002 World Weightlifting Championships were held in Warsaw, Poland from 19 November to 26 November. The men's 56 kilograms division was staged on 19 November 2002.

== Schedule ==
Date	Time	Event
19 November 2002	14:00	Group B
19 November 2002	20:00	Group A

== Medalists ==
Event	Gold		Silver		Bronze	
Snatch	Wu Meijin (CHN)	127.5 kg	Yang Chin-yi (TPE)	125.0 kg	Adrian Jigău (ROM)	125.0 kg
Clean & Jerk	Wu Meijin (CHN)	160.0 kg	Wang Shin-yuan (TPE)	152.5 kg	Yang Chin-yi (TPE)	152.5 kg
Total	Wu Meijin (CHN)	287.5 kg	Yang Chin-yi (TPE)	277.5 kg	Adrian Jigău (ROM)	277.5 kg

== Records ==
Prior to this competition, the existing world records were as follows.

World Record	Snatch	Halil Mutlu (TUR)	138.5 kg	Antalya, Turkey	4 November 2001
World Record	Clean & Jerk	Halil Mutlu (TUR)	168.0 kg	Trenčín, Slovakia	24 April 2001
World Record	Total	Halil Mutlu (TUR)	305.0 kg	Sydney, Australia	16 September 2000

== Results ==
Rank	Athlete	Group	Body weight	Snatch (kg)				Clean & Jerk (kg)				Total
Rank	Athlete	Group	Body weight	1	2	3	Rank	1	2	3	Rank	Total
1st place, gold medalist(s)	Wu Meijin (CHN)	A	55.50	122.5	~~127.5~~	127.5	1st place, gold medalist(s)	155.0	~~160.0~~	160.0	1st place, gold medalist(s)	287.5
2nd place, silver medalist(s)	Yang Chin-yi (TPE)	A	55.60	~~125.0~~	~~125.0~~	125.0	2nd place, silver medalist(s)	~~152.5~~	~~152.5~~	152.5	3rd place, bronze medalist(s)	277.5
3rd place, bronze medalist(s)	Adrian Jigău (ROM)	A	55.70	120.0	125.0	~~127.5~~	3rd place, bronze medalist(s)	145.0	150.0	152.5	4	277.5
4	Wang Shin-yuan (TPE)	A	55.45	115.0	120.0	~~122.5~~	6	~~145.0~~	152.5	~~157.5~~	2nd place, silver medalist(s)	272.5
5	László Tancsics (HUN)	A	55.25	120.0	~~125.0~~	~~125.0~~	5	145.0	~~150.0~~	~~150.0~~	5	265.0
6	Éric Bonnel (FRA)	A	55.85	105.0	110.0	112.5	7	132.5	137.5	~~142.5~~	6	250.0
7	Theocharis Chatzidis (GRE)	B	55.85	100.0	105.0	107.5	8	125.0	130.0	135.0	7	242.5
8	Yasunobu Sekikawa (JPN)	A	55.70	~~105.0~~	~~105.0~~	105.0	9	120.0	~~130.0~~	~~130.0~~	9	225.0
9	Iván Hernández (ESP)	B	55.05	92.5	97.5	~~102.5~~	11	115.0	120.0	~~122.5~~	8	217.5
—	Sanjar Kadyrbergenow (TKM)	B	55.55	95.0	100.0	~~105.0~~	10	~~115.0~~	~~115.0~~	~~115.0~~	—	—
—	Vitali Dzerbianiou (BLR)	A	55.80	120.0	125.0	~~127.5~~	4	~~147.5~~	~~147.5~~	~~147.5~~	—	—
