= Cihărean =

Cihărean is a Romanian surname. Notable people with the surname include:

- Marius Cihărean (born 1975), Romanian Olympic weightlifter
- Traian Cihărean (born 1969), Romanian Olympic weightlifter, brother of Marius
