= 2003 European Weightlifting Championships =

International weightlifting competition

2003 European Championships

The 2003 European Weightlifting Championships were held in Loutraki, Greece. It was the 82nd edition of the event.

== Medal overview ==
=== Men ===
Event	Gold	Silver	Bronze
– 56 kg	(Belarus) Vitaly Derbenev	(Romania) Adrian Jigau	(Cyprus) Naiden Rusev
– 62 kg	(Turkey) Halil Mutlu	(Bulgaria) Stefan Georgiev	(Belarus) Henadzi Aliashchuk
– 69 kg	(Bulgaria) Galabin Boevski	(Azerbaijan) Turan Mirzayev	(Turkey) Ekrem Celil
– 77 kg	(Bulgaria) Georgi Markov	(Turkey) Reyhan Arabacioglu	(Poland) Andrzej Kozlowski
– 85 kg	(Bulgaria) Zlatan Vanev	(Russia) Yury Myshkovets	(Russia) Rouslan Lizounov
– 94 kg	(Bulgaria) Milen Dobrev	(Russia) Sergey Zhukov	(Poland) Tadeusz Drzazga
– 105 kg	(Ukraine) Ihor Razoronov	(Bulgaria) Alan Tsagaev	(Russia) Vladimir Smortchkov
+ 105 kg	(Russia) Evgeny Chigishev	(Armenia) Ashot Danielyan	(Bulgaria) Damyan Damyanov

=== Women ===
Event	Gold	Silver	Bronze
– 48 kg	(Russia) Svetlana Ulyanova	(Ukraine) Olena Zinovieva	(Spain) Gema Peris
– 53 kg	(Turkey) Nurcan Taylan	(Bulgaria) Izabela Dragneva	(Romania) Marioara Munteanu
– 58 kg	(Turkey) Aylin Dasdelen	(Turkey) Emine Bilgin	(United Kingdom) Michaela Breeze
– 63 kg	(Greece) Anastasia Tsakiri	(Bulgaria) Gergana Kirilova	(Bulgaria) Zlatina Atanasova
– 69 kg	(Russia) Valentina Popova	(Bulgaria) Milena Trendafilova	(Russia) Zarema Kasaeva
– 75 kg	(Russia) Natalya Zabolotnaya	(Bulgaria) Rumiana Petkova	(Greece) Christina Ioannidi
+ 75 kg	(Russia) Albina Khomich	(Poland) Agata Wróbel	(Turkey) Derya Açıkgöz

== Medal table ==
Rank	Nation	Gold	Silver	Bronze	Total
1	Russia	5	2	3	10
2	Bulgaria	4	6	2	12
3	Turkey	3	2	2	7
4	Ukraine	1	1	0	2
5	Belarus	1	0	1	2
5	Greece	1	0	1	2
7	Poland	0	1	2	3
8	Romania	0	1	1	2
9	Armenia	0	1	0	1
9	Azerbaijan	0	1	0	1
11	Cyprus	0	0	1	1
11	Great Britain	0	0	1	1
11	Spain	0	0	1	1
Totals (13 entries)		15	15	15	45
