= 2006 European Weightlifting Championships =

International weightlifting competition

2006 European Championships

The 2006 European Weightlifting Championships were held in Władysławowo, Poland from 29 April to 7 May 2006. It was the 85th edition of the event, which was first staged in 1896.

== Medal overview ==
=== Men ===
Event	Gold	Silver	Bronze
– 56 kg	(Belarus) Vitali Dzerbianiou	(Moldova) Igor Grabucea	(Hungary) László Tancsics
– 62 kg	(Russia) Dmitry Voronin	(Romania) Adrian Jigău	(Belarus) Henadzy Makhveyenia
– 69 kg	(Bulgaria) Demir Demirev	(France) Vencelas Dabaya	(Armenia) Armen Ghazaryan
– 77 kg	(Armenia) Gevorg Davtyan	(Russia) Vladislav Lukanin	(Bulgaria) Georgi Markov
– 85 kg	(Belarus) Andrei Rybakou	(Russia) Yury Myshkovets	(Russia) Zaur Takhushev
– 94 kg	(Poland) Szymon Kołecki	(Russia) Andrey Demanov	(Greece) Nikolas Kourtidis
– 105 kg	(Poland) Marcin Dołęga	(Russia) Vladimir Smorchkov	(Moldova) Alexandru Bratan
+ 105 kg	(Latvia) Viktors Ščerbatihs	(Bulgaria) Velichko Cholakov	(Poland) Paweł Najdek

=== Women ===
Event	Gold	Silver	Bronze
– 48 kg	(Spain) Estefania Juan	(Russia) Svetlana Ulyanova	(Italy) Genny Caterina Pagliaro
– 53 kg	(Romania) Marioara Munteanu	(Ukraine) Nataliya Trotsenko	(France) Virginie Lachaume
– 58 kg	(Russia) Marina Shainova	(Albania) Fetie Kasaj	(Poland) Aleksandra Klejnowska
– 63 kg	(Russia) Svetlana Shimkova	(Belarus) Hanna Batsiushka	(Ukraine) Vanda Maslovska
– 69 kg	(Russia) Tatiana Matveeva	(Ukraine) Natalya Davydova	(Poland) Dominika Misterska
– 75 kg	(Russia) Natalya Zabolotnaya	(Russia) Valentina Popova	(Armenia) Hripsime Khurshudyan
+ 75 kg	(Ukraine) Olha Korobka	(Russia) Natalia Gagarina	(Bulgaria) Yordanka Apostolova

== Medal table ==
Rank	Nation	Gold	Silver	Bronze	Total
1	Russia	5	6	2	13
2	Belarus	3	1	1	5
3	Ukraine	1	2	1	4
4	Bulgaria	1	1	2	4
4	Poland	1	1	2	4
6	Romania	1	1	0	2
7	Armenia	1	0	2	3
8	Latvia	1	0	0	1
8	Spain	1	0	0	1
10	Moldova	0	1	1	2
11	Albania	0	1	0	1
12	France	0	0	2	2
13	Hungary	0	0	1	1
13	Italy	0	0	1	1
Totals (14 entries)		15	14	15	44
