= Leonidas Sabanis =

Greek weightlifter (born 1971)

Personal information
- Born: 28 October 1971 (age 54) Korçë, Albania
Medal record
Men's Weightlifting
Representing Albania
European Championships
Bronze medal – third place	1989 Athens	– 56 kg
Representing Greece
Summer Olympics
Silver medal – second place	1996 Atlanta	– 59 kg
Silver medal – second place	2000 Sydney	– 62 kg
Disqualified	2004 Athens	– 62 kg
World Championships
Gold medal – first place	1995 Guangzhou	– 59 kg
Gold medal – first place	1998 Lahti	– 62 kg
Silver medal – second place	1999 Athens	– 62 kg
European Championships
Gold medal – first place	1996 Stavanger	– 59 kg
Silver medal – second place	1997 Rijeka	– 59 kg
Silver medal – second place	1998 Riesa	– 62 kg
Silver medal – second place	1999 La Coruña	– 62 kg
Gold medal – first place	2002 Antalya	– 62 kg

Leonidas Sabanis (Greek: Λεωνίδας Σαμπάνης, Albanian: Luan Shabani; born 28 October 1971), sometimes spelled Leonidas Sampanis, is a Greek retired weightlifter, born in the city of Korce, Albania. He represented Albania in the 1989 European Weightlifting Championship. He switched allegiance after the fall of Communism in Albania in 1991. He represented Greece in 1996, 2000 and 2004 Summer Olympics. He has also been a World Champion representing Greece. He was named the 1998 Greek Male Athlete of the Year.

== Early life and career ==
Sabanis was born Luan Shabani on 28 October 1971 in southern Albania to a Greek family.

=== Results representing Albania ===
At the European Championship in Athens, Greece, in 1989, Sabanis represented Albania as Luan Shabani and won a bronze (big) medal in the 56 kg category. He was the first to win a medal at a European Championship for Albania. A year later, at the European Championship in Aalborg (Denmark) in 1990, Sabanis won a silver (big) medal, and the first such medal for Albania.

=== Results representing Greece ===
Sabanis emigrated to Greece in 1991 and represented Greece starting from 1993. He won a silver medal in the 59 kg category at the 1996 Summer Olympics in Atlanta, United States and in the 62 kg category in the 2000 Summer Olympics in Sydney, Australia. Sabanis was originally awarded a bronze medal at the 2004 Summer Olympics in Athens, but the medal was later stripped from him as a result of a doping scandal.
