= Valeriu Calancea =

Romanian weightlifter (born 1980)

Medal record

Men's Weightlifting

Representing Romania

World Championships
| Gold medal – first place | 2003 Vancouver | – 85 kg |
| Bronze medal – third place | 2010 Antalya | – 94 kg |

European Championships
| Gold medal – first place | 2007 Strasbourg | – 85 kg |
| Silver medal – second place | 2005 Sofia | – 85 kg |

Valeriu Calancea (born November 18, 1980, in Chişinău) is a Romanian weightlifter.
