= 2005 European Weightlifting Championships =

International weightlifting competition

2005 European Championships

The 2005 European Weightlifting Championships were held in Sofia, Bulgaria from April 19 to April 24, 2005. It was the 84th edition of the event. There were a total number of 185 athletes competing, from 30 nations.

== Medal overview ==
=== Men ===
Event	Gold	Silver	Bronze
– 56 kg	(Turkey) Sedat Artuç	(Turkey) Erol Bilgin	(Belarus) Vitali Dzerbianiou
– 62 kg	(Bulgaria) Sevdalin Minchev	(Romania) Adrian Jigau	(Bulgaria) Stefan Georgiev
– 69 kg	(Bulgaria) Demir Demirev	(Turkey) Ferit Sen	(Bulgaria) Mehmed Fikretov
– 77 kg	(Turkey) Taner Sağır	(Romania) Sebastian Dogariu	(Bulgaria) Ivan Stoitsov
– 85 kg	(Belarus) Ruslan Novikov	(Romania) Valeriu Calancea	(Armenia) Arsen Melikyan
– 94 kg	(Turkey) Hakan Yilmaz	(Russia) Andrey Skorobogatov	(Ukraine) Kostyantyn Piliyev
– 105 kg	(Russia) Vladimir Smorchkov	(Turkey) Bünyamin Sudaş	(Lithuania) Ramūnas Vyšniauskas
+ 105 kg	(Latvia) Viktors Ščerbatihs	(Russia) Evgeny Chigishev	(Armenia) Ashot Danielyan

=== Women ===
Event	Gold	Silver	Bronze
– 48 kg	(Russia) Svetlana Ulyanova	(Spain) Rebecca Sires Rodrigez	(Bulgaria) Donka Mincheva
– 53 kg	(Belarus) Nastassia Novikava	(Romania) Marioara Munteanu	(Ukraine) Nataliya Trotsenko
– 58 kg	(Russia) Marina Shainova	(Poland) Aleksandra Klejnowska	(Poland) Marieta Gotfryd
– 63 kg	(Russia) Svetlana Shimkova	(Poland) Dominika Misterska	(Bulgaria) Gergana Kirilova
– 69 kg	(Russia) Zarema Kasayeva	(Russia) Olga Kiseleva	(Ukraine) Nataliya Davydova
– 75 kg	(Russia) Svetlana Podobedova	(Russia) Valentina Popova	(Bulgaria) Rumyana Petkova
+ 75 kg	(Ukraine) Viktoriya Shaimardanova	(Ukraine) Yuliya Dovhal	(Bulgaria) Yordanka Apostolova

== Medal table ==
Rank	Nation	Gold	Silver	Bronze	Total
1	Russia	6	4	0	10
2	Turkey	3	3	0	6
3	Bulgaria	2	0	7	9
4	Belarus	2	0	1	3
5	Ukraine	1	1	3	5
6	Latvia	1	0	0	1
7	Romania	0	4	0	4
8	Poland	0	2	1	3
9	Spain	0	1	0	1
10	Armenia	0	0	2	2
11	Lithuania	0	0	1	1
Totals (11 entries)		15	15	15	45
