= 1999 European Weightlifting Championships =

International weightlifting competition

1999 European Championships

The 78th European Weightlifting Championships were held in A Coruña, Spain from April 14 to April 18, 1999. There were a total number of 144 competing athletes from 29 nations.

== Medal overview ==
=== Men ===
Event	Gold	Silver	Bronze
– 56 kg	(Turkey) Halil Mutlu	(Romania) Adrian Jigău	(Bulgaria) Ivan Ivanov
– 62 kg	(Bulgaria) Sevdalin Minchev	(Greece) Leonidas Sabanis	(Croatia) Nikolaj Pešalov
– 69 kg	(Bulgaria) Galabin Boevski	(Bulgaria) Plamen Zhelyazkov	(Greece) Valerios Leonidis
– 77 kg	(Bulgaria) Petar Tanev	(Bulgaria) Georgi Markov	(Poland) Andrzej Kozlowski
– 85 kg	(Germany) Marc Huster	(Bulgaria) Georgi Gardev	(Turkey) Dursun Sevinç
– 94 kg	(Poland) Szymon Kołecki	(Greece) Akakios Kakiasvilis	(Turkey) Bünyamin Sudaş
– 105 kg	(Ukraine) Denys Hotfrid	(Poland) Mariusz Jedra	(Slovakia) Martin Tešovič
+ 105 kg	(Armenia) Ashot Danielyan	(Germany) Ronny Weller	(Latvia) Viktors Ščerbatihs

=== Women ===
Event	Gold	Silver	Bronze
– 48 kg	(Bulgaria) Donka Mincheva	(Bulgaria) Siyka Stoyeva	(Spain) Gema Peris
– 53 kg	(Bulgaria) Izabela Dragneva	(Spain) Estefania Juan	(Spain) Rebeca Sires
– 58 kg	(Bulgaria) Neli Simova	(France) Ingrid Fevre	(Poland) Marieta Gotfryd
– 63 kg	(Russia) Valentina Popova	(Greece) Ioanna Khatziioannou	(Bulgaria) Gergana Kirilova
– 69 kg	(Bulgaria) Milena Trendafilova	(Russia) Irina Kasimova	(Poland) Beata Prei
– 75 kg	(Czech Republic) Radomíra Ševčíková	(Turkey) Şule Şahbaz	(Finland) Karoliina Lundahl
+ 75 kg	(Poland) Agata Wróbel	(Russia) Albina Khomich	(Ukraine) Vita Rudenok
