= 2007 European Weightlifting Championships =

International weightlifting competition

2007 European Championships

The 2007 European Weightlifting Championships were held in Strasbourg, France from 17 April to 22 April 2007. It was the 86th edition of the event, which was first staged in 1896.

== Medal overview ==
=== Men ===
Event	Gold	Silver	Bronze
– 56 kg	(Moldova) Igor Bour	(Belarus) Vitali Dzerbianiou	(Moldova) Igor Grabucea
– 62 kg	(Russia) Sergey Petrosyan	(Belarus) Henadzy Makhveyenia	(Turkey) Erol Bilgin
– 69 kg	(France) Vencelas Dabaya	(Armenia) Tigran G. Martirosyan	(Russia) Vladislav Lukanin
– 77 kg	(Armenia) Gevorg Davtyan	(Armenia) Ara Khachatryan	(Turkey) Taner Sağır
– 85 kg	(Romania) Valeriu Calancea	(Turkey) İzzet İnce	(Belarus) Vadzim Straltsou
– 94 kg	(Poland) Szymon Kołecki	(Russia) Roman Konstantinov	(Moldova) Evgheni Bratan
– 105 kg	(Slovakia) Martin Tešovič	(Russia) Gleb Pisarevskiy	(Russia) Dmitry Lapikov
+ 105 kg	(Latvia) Viktors Ščerbatihs	(Russia) Evgeny Chigishev	(Poland) Paweł Najdek

=== Women ===
Event	Gold	Silver	Bronze
– 48 kg	(Spain) Estefania Juan	(Turkey) Nurcan Taylan	(Italy) Genny Caterina Pagliaro
– 53 kg	(Romania) Marioara Munteanu	(Ukraine) Nataliya Trotsenko	(Russia) Svetlana Ulyanova
– 58 kg	(Russia) Marina Shainova	(Norway) Ruth Kasirye	(Poland) Aleksandra Klejnowska
– 63 kg	(Armenia) Meline Daluzyan	(Turkey) Sibel Şimşek	(Belarus) Hanna Batsiushka
– 69 kg	(Russia) Oxana Slivenko	(Armenia) Nazik Avdalyan	(Ukraine) Natalya Davydova
– 75 kg	(Armenia) Hripsime Khurshudyan	(Russia) Tatiana Matveeva	(Spain) Lydia Valentín
+ 75 kg	(Ukraine) Olha Korobka	(Belarus) Katsiaryna Shkuratava	(Ukraine) Yuliya Dovhal

== Medal table ==
Rank	Nation	Gold	Silver	Bronze	Total
1	Russia	3	4	3	10
2	Armenia	3	3	0	6
3	Romania	2	0	0	2
4	Ukraine	1	1	2	4
5	Moldova	1	0	2	3
5	Poland	1	0	2	3
7	Spain	1	0	1	2
8	France	1	0	0	1
8	Latvia	1	0	0	1
8	Slovakia	1	0	0	1
11	Belarus	0	3	2	5
11	Turkey	0	3	2	5
13	Norway	0	1	0	1
14	Italy	0	0	1	1
Totals (14 entries)		15	15	15	45
