= Mariusz Jędra =

Polish weightlifter (born 1973)

Personal information
- Born: August 16, 1973 (age 52)
Medal record
Men's Weightlifting
Representing Poland
World Championships
Silver medal – second place	1997 Chiangmai	– 108 kg
European Championships
Silver medal – second place	1999 La Coruña	– 105 kg

Mariusz Jędra (born August 16, 1973, in Wrocław, Dolnośląskie) is a retired male weightlifter from Poland. He competed for his native country at the 2000 Summer Olympics in Sydney, Australia, finishing in ninth place in the men's heavyweight division (– 105 kg). Jędra is best known for winning the silver medal at the 1997 World Weightlifting Championships in the men's heavyweight class (– 108 kg).
