= 2008 European Weightlifting Championships =

International weightlifting competition

2008 European Championships

The 2008 European Weightlifting Championships were held in Lignano Sabbiadoro, Italy from 11 to 20 April 2008. It was the 87th edition of the event, which was first staged in 1896.

== Medal overview ==
=== Men ===
Event		Gold		Silver		Bronze	
– 56 kg Report	Snatch	Halil Mutlu (TUR)	120 kg	Tom Goegebuer (BEL)	111 kg	Igor Grabucea (MDA)	110 kg
– 56 kg Report	Clean & Jerk	Halil Mutlu (TUR)	149 kg	Vito Dellino (ITA)	135 kg	Vladimır Urumov (BUL)	133 kg
– 56 kg Report	Total	Halil Mutlu (TUR)	269 kg	Tom Goegebuer (BEL)	244 kg	Vladimır Urumov (BUL)	239 kg
– 62 kg Report	Snatch	Erol Bilgin (TUR)	135 kg	Sergey Petrosyan (RUS)	135 kg	Sardar Hasanov (AZE)	125 kg
– 62 kg Report	Clean & Jerk	Sergey Petrosyan (RUS)	167 kg	Erol Bilgin (TUR)	160 kg	Zulfugar Suleymanov (AZE)	158 kg
– 62 kg Report	Total	Sergey Petrosyan (RUS)	302 kg	Erol Bilgin (TUR)	295 kg	Stefan Georgiev (BUL)	278 kg
– 69 kg Report	Snatch	Tigran Martirosyan (ARM)	158 kg	Demir Demirev (BUL)	146 kg	Turan Mirzayev (AZE)	146 kg
– 69 kg Report	Clean & Jerk	Venceslas Dabaya (FRA)	188 kg	Tigran Martirosyan (ARM)	188 kg	Mehmed Fikretov (BUL)	175 kg
– 69 kg Report	Total	Tigran Martirosyan (ARM)	346 kg	Venceslas Dabaya (FRA)	333 kg	Mehmed Fikretov (BUL)	315 kg
– 77 kg Report	Snatch	Ara Khachatryan (ARM)	165 kg	Oleg Perepetchenov (RUS)	164 kg	Aleksey Yufkin (RUS)	155 kg
– 77 kg Report	Clean & Jerk	Aleksey Yufkin (RUS)	200 kg	Oleg Perepetchenov (RUS)	198 kg	Ara Khachatryan (ARM)	196 kg
– 77 kg Report	Total	Oleg Perepetchenov (RUS)	362 kg	Ara Khachatryan (ARM)	361 kg	Aleksey Yufkin (RUS)	355 kg
– 85 kg Report	Snatch	Tigran Martirosyan (ARM)	172 kg	Vasily Polovnikov (RUS)	168 kg	İzzet İnce (TUR)	167 kg
– 85 kg Report	Clean & Jerk	Tigran Martirosyan (ARM)	205 kg	Vasily Polovnikov (RUS)	205 kg	Benjamin Hennequin (FRA)	200 kg
– 85 kg Report	Total	Tigran Martirosyan (ARM)	377 kg	Vasily Polovnikov (RUS)	373 kg	Georgi Markov (BUL)	362 kg
– 94 kg Report	Snatch	Szymon Kołecki (POL)	177 kg	Edgar Gevorgyan (ARM)	176 kg	Mukhamat Sozaev (RUS)	174 kg
– 94 kg Report	Clean & Jerk	Szymon Kołecki (POL)	220 kg	Andrey Demanov (RUS)	213 kg	Kostyantyn Piliyev (UKR)	212 kg
– 94 kg Report	Total	Szymon Kołecki (POL)	397 kg	Andrey Demanov (RUS)	385 kg	Mukhamat Sozaev (RUS)	384 kg
– 105 kg Report	Snatch	Dmitry Berestov (RUS)	190 kg	Ramūnas Vyšniauskas (LTU)	185 kg	Martin Tešovič (SVK)	180 kg
– 105 kg Report	Clean & Jerk	Ramūnas Vyšniauskas (LTU)	220 kg	Oleksiy Torokhtiy (UKR)	220 kg	Dmitry Berestov (RUS)	220 kg
– 105 kg Report	Total	Dmitry Berestov (RUS)	410 kg	Ramūnas Vyšniauskas (LTU)	405 kg	Robert Dolega (POL)	395 kg
+ 105 kg Report	Snatch	Matthias Steiner (GER)	200 kg	Ihor Shymechko (UKR)	196 kg	Evgeny Chigishev (RUS)	195 kg
+ 105 kg Report	Clean & Jerk	Viktors Ščerbatihs (LAT)	252 kg	Evgeny Chigishev (RUS)	247 kg	Matthias Steiner (GER)	246 kg
+ 105 kg Report	Total	Viktors Ščerbatihs (LAT)	447 kg	Matthias Steiner (GER)	446 kg	Evgeny Chigishev (RUS)	442 kg

=== Women ===
Event		Gold		Silver		Bronze	
– 48 kg Report	Snatch	Genny Pagliaro (ITA)	88 kg	Nurcan Taylan (TUR)	87 kg	Sibel Özkan (TUR)	86 kg
– 48 kg Report	Clean & Jerk	Sibel Özkan (TUR)	110 kg	Nurcan Taylan (TUR)	109 kg	Genny Pagliaro (ITA)	106 kg
– 48 kg Report	Total	Nurcan Taylan (TUR)	196 kg	Sibel Özkan (TUR)	196 kg	Genny Pagliaro (ITA)	194 kg
– 53 kg Report	Snatch	Nataliya Trotsenko (UKR)	88 kg	María de la Puente (ESP)	86 kg	Marioara Munteanu (ROU)	86 kg
– 53 kg Report	Clean & Jerk	Nataliya Trotsenko (UKR)	109 kg	Julia Rohde (GER)	105 kg	María de la Puente (ESP)	104 kg
– 53 kg Report	Total	Nataliya Trotsenko (UKR)	197 kg	María de la Puente (ESP)	190 kg	Julia Rohde (GER)	188 kg
– 58 kg Report	Snatch	Romela Begaj (ALB)	101 kg	Marieta Gotfryd (POL)	94 kg	Aleksandra Klejnowska (POL)	91 kg
– 58 kg Report	Clean & Jerk	Aleksandra Klejnowska (POL)	121 kg	Roxana Cocos (ROU)	120 kg	Romela Begaj (ALB)	111 kg
– 58 kg Report	Total	Aleksandra Klejnowska (POL)	212 kg	Romela Begaj (ALB)	212 kg	Roxana Cocos (ROU)	209 kg
– 63 kg Report	Snatch	Meline Daluzyan (ARM)	107 kg	Sibel Şimşek (TUR)	105 kg	Ruth Kasirye (NOR)	101 kg
– 63 kg Report	Clean & Jerk	Meline Daluzyan (ARM)	128 kg	Milka Maneva (BUL)	123 kg	Sibel Şimşek (TUR)	121 kg
– 63 kg Report	Total	Meline Daluzyan (ARM)	235 kg	Sibel Şimşek (TUR)	226 kg	Milka Maneva (BUL)	223 kg
– 69 kg Report	Snatch	Nazik Avdalyan (ARM)	106 kg	Tatiana Matveeva (RUS)	103 kg	Yulia Artemova (UKR)	101 kg
– 69 kg Report	Clean & Jerk	Nazik Avdalyan (ARM)	136 kg	Tatiana Matveeva (RUS)	136 kg	Slaveyka Ruzhinska (BUL)	124 kg
– 69 kg Report	Total	Nazik Avdalyan (ARM)	242 kg	Tatiana Matveeva (RUS)	239 kg	Slaveyka Ruzhinska (BUL)	219 kg
– 75 kg Report	Snatch	Natalya Zabolotnaya (RUS)	123 kg	Lydia Valentín (ESP)	115 kg	Tetyana Zhukova (UKR)	98 kg
– 75 kg Report	Clean & Jerk	Hripsime Khurshudyan (ARM)	141 kg	Natalya Zabolotnaya (RUS)	141 kg	Lydia Valentín (ESP)	130 kg
– 75 kg Report	Total	Natalya Zabolotnaya (RUS)	264 kg	Lydia Valentín (ESP)	245 kg	Yvonne Kranz (GER)	220 kg
+75 kg Report	Snatch	Olha Korobka (UKR)	127 kg	Yuliya Dovhal (UKR)	118 kg	Magdalena Ufnal (POL)	110 kg
+75 kg Report	Clean & Jerk	Olha Korobka (UKR)	150 kg	Yuliya Dovhal (UKR)	140 kg	Kathleen Schöppe (GER)	129 kg
+75 kg Report	Total	Olha Korobka (UKR)	277 kg	Yuliya Dovhal (UKR)	258 kg	Magdalena Ufnal (POL)	237 kg

=== Medal table ===
Ranking by Big (Total result) medals

* Host nation (Italy)

Rank	Nation	Gold	Silver	Bronze	Total
1	Russia (RUS)	4	3	3	10
2	Armenia (ARM)	4	1	0	5
3	Turkey (TUR)	2	3	0	5
4	Ukraine (UKR)	2	1	0	3
5	Poland (POL)	2	0	2	4
6	Latvia (LAT)	1	0	0	1
7	Spain (ESP)	0	2	0	2
8	Germany (GER)	0	1	2	3
9	Albania (ALB)	0	1	0	1
9	Belgium (BEL)	0	1	0	1
9	France (FRA)	0	1	0	1
9	Lithuania (LTU)	0	1	0	1
13	Bulgaria (BUL)	0	0	6	6
14	Italy (ITA)*	0	0	1	1
14	Romania (ROU)	0	0	1	1
Totals (15 entries)		15	15	15	45

Ranking by all medals: Big (Total result) and Small (Snatch and Clean & Jerk)

* Host nation (Italy)

Rank	Nation	Gold	Silver	Bronze	Total
1	Armenia (ARM)	13	3	1	17
2	Russia (RUS)	8	13	7	28
3	Turkey (TUR)	6	7	3	16
4	Ukraine (UKR)	6	5	3	14
5	Poland (POL)	5	1	4	10
6	Latvia (LAT)	2	0	0	2
7	Germany (GER)	1	2	4	7
8	Lithuania (LTU)	1	2	0	3
9	Italy (ITA)*	1	1	2	4
10	Albania (ALB)	1	1	1	3
10	France (FRA)	1	1	1	3
12	Spain (ESP)	0	4	2	6
13	Bulgaria (BUL)	0	2	9	11
14	Belgium (BEL)	0	2	0	2
15	Romania (ROU)	0	1	2	3
16	Azerbaijan (AZE)	0	0	3	3
17	Moldova (MDA)	0	0	1	1
17	Norway (NOR)	0	0	1	1
17	Slovakia (SVK)	0	0	1	1
Totals (19 entries)		45	45	45	135
