= 1997 European Weightlifting Championships =

International weightlifting competition

1997 European Championships

The 1997 European Weightlifting Championships were held in Rijeka, Croatia for the men. The women competition were held in Sevilla, Spain. It was the 76th edition of the men event, and the 10th for the women.

== Medal overview ==
=== Men ===
Event	Gold	Silver	Bronze
– 54 kg	(Turkey) Halil Mutlu	(Bulgaria) Sevdalin Angelov	(Russia) Mikhail Shevchenko
– 59 kg	(Bulgaria) Nikolay Peshalov	(Greece) Leonidas Sabanis	(Bulgaria) Stefan Georgiev
– 64 kg	(Turkey) Hafız Süleymanoğlu	(Hungary) Zoltán Farkas	(Romania) Marian-Nicolae Dodita
– 70 kg	(Turkey) Ergün Batmaz	(Bulgaria) Zlatan Vanev	(Bulgaria) Plamen Zhelyazkov
– 76 kg	(Bulgaria) Yoto Yotov	(Germany) Ingo Steinhoefel	(Ukraine) Ruslan Savchenko
– 83 kg	(Germany) Marc Huster	(Turkey) Dursun Sevinc	(Russia) Yury Myshkovets
– 91 kg	(Turkey) Sunay Bulut	(Germany) Oliver Caruso	(Ukraine) Oleh Chumak
– 99 kg	(Ukraine) Stanislav Rybalchenko	(Russia) Dmitry Smirnov	(Slovakia) Martin Tesovic
– 108 kg	(Ukraine) Denys Hotfrid	(Russia) Evgeny Chichliannikov	(Latvia) Viktors Ščerbatihs
+ 108 kg	(Hungary) Tibor Stark	(Latvia) Raimonds Bergmanis	(Norway) Stian Grimseth

=== Women ===
Event	Gold	Silver	Bronze
– 46 kg	(Spain) Estefania Juan	(Russia) Lyubov Averianova	(Bulgaria) Donka Mincheva
– 50 kg	(Turkey) Esma Can	(Bulgaria) Izabela Dragneva	(Spain) Rebeca Sires Rodriguez
– 54 kg	(Bulgaria) Neli Yankova	(Turkey) Neshlian Demiroz	(Slovakia) Dagmar Danekova
– 59 kg	(Turkey) Fatma Kabadayi	(Greece) Maria Christoforidou	(Spain) Josefa Perez
– 64 kg	(Greece) Ioanna Chatziioannou	(Hungary) Erzsébet Márkus	(Russia) Tatyana Tesikova
– 70 kg	(Turkey) Sule Sahbaz	(Russia) Irina Kasimova	(Hungary) Ilona Dankó
– 76 kg	(Turkey) Aysel Özgür	(Hungary) Mária Takács	(Spain) Monica Carrio
– 83 kg	(Turkey) Derya Açıkgçz	(Russia) Albina Khomich	(Germany) Monique Riesterer
+ 83 kg	(Turkey) Nurcihan Gonul	(Greece) Stamatia Bontozi	(Finland) Katarina Sederholm
