= Sergey Petrosyan =

Azerbaijani-Russian weightlifter

Personal information
- Born: June 7, 1988 Baku, Azerbaijan SSR, USSR
- Died: July 26, 2017 (aged 29)
Medal record
Men's Weightlifting
Representing Russia
European Championships
Gold medal – first place	2007 Strasbourg	– 62 kg
Gold medal – first place	2008 Lignano Sabbiadoro	– 62 kg

Sergey Petrosyan (Armenian: Սերգեյ Պետրոսյան, Russian: Сергей Арсенович Петросян; June 7, 1988 – July 26, 2017) was an Azerbaijani-Russian weightlifter of Armenian descent.

Petrosyan participated in the European Weightlifting Championships of 2007 and 2008, and won gold in both years.

== See also ==
- 2007 European Weightlifting Championships
- 2008 European Weightlifting Championships
