= Oleg Chiritso =

Belarusian weightlifter (born 1964)

Personal information
- Full name: Oleg Vladislavovich Chiritso
- Born: 1 April 1964 (age 62) Minsk
- Weight: 99 kg (218 lb)

Sport
- Country: Belarus
- Sport: Weightlifting
- Weight class: 99 kg
- Team: National team
Medal record
Men's weightlifting
Representing Belarus
World Championships
Bronze medal – third place	1995 Guangzhou	99 kg (clean & jerk)
- Updated on 16 November 2016

Oleg Vladislavovich Chiritso (Олег Владиславович Чирицо, also transliterated Chiritsa, born 1 April 1964) is a Belarusian male former weightlifter, who competed in the 99 kg category and represented Belarus at international competitions. He won the bronze medal in the clean & jerk at the 1995 World Weightlifting Championships lifting 217.5 kg. He participated at the 1996 Summer Olympics.
