= Vitali Dzerbianiou =

Belarusian weightlifter (1976–2022)

Personal information
- Born: 5 August 1976 Mogilev, Byelorussian SSR, USSR
- Died: 2 May 2022 (aged 45)
Medal record
Men's Weightlifting
Representing Belarus
European Championships
Gold medal – first place	2002 Antalya	– 56 kg
Gold medal – first place	2003 Loutraki	– 56 kg
Gold medal – first place	2006 Władysławowo	– 56 kg
Gold medal – first place	2010 Minsk	– 56 kg
Silver medal – second place	2004 Kyiv	– 56 kg
Silver medal – second place	2007 Strasbourg	– 56 kg
Bronze medal – third place	2001 Trencin	– 56 kg
Bronze medal – third place	2005 Sofia	– 56 kg

Vitali Dzerbianiou or Derbenev (Belarusian: Віталій Дзербянёў; 5 August 1976 – 2 May 2022) was a Belarusian weightlifter. His personal best combined lift was 280 kg.

He competed in Weightlifting at the 2008 Summer Olympics in the 56 kg division but failed to pass the heats.

He was prolific at the World Championships with participations in 1999, 2001, 2002, 2003, 2006 and 2007.

He was 5 ft 3 inches tall and weighed 132 lb. Dzerbianiou's death was announced on 2 May 2022.
