= Dominika Misterska =

Polish weightlifter (born 1979)

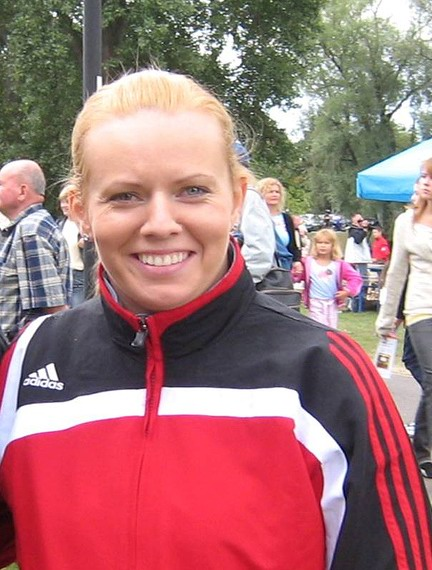

Personal information
- Full name: Dominika Misterska-Zasowska
- Nationality: Poland
- Born: 20 July 1979 (age 46) Łódź, Poland
- Height: 1.63 m (5 ft 4 in)
- Weight: 63 kg (139 lb)

Sport
- Sport: Weightlifting
- Event: 63 kg
- Club: WLKS Siedlce
- Coached by: Danuta Socko
Medal record
Women's weightlifting
Representing Poland
European Championships
Silver medal – second place	2005 Sofia	63 kg
Bronze medal – third place	2006 Władysławowo	63 kg

Dominika Misterska-Zasowska (born 20 July 1979 in Łódź) is a Polish weightlifter. She won a silver medal for the middleweight division at the 2005 European Weightlifting Championships in Sofia, Bulgaria, and bronze at the 2006 European Weightlifting Championships in Władysławowo, Poland.

Misterska-Zasowska represented Poland at the 2008 Summer Olympics in Beijing, where she competed for the women's middleweight category (63 kg). Misterska-Zasowska placed eleventh in this event, as she successfully lifted 94 kg in the single-motion snatch, and hoisted 117 kg in the two-part, shoulder-to-overhead clean and jerk, for a total of 211 kg.
