= Halil Mutlu =

Turkish weightlifter (born 1973)

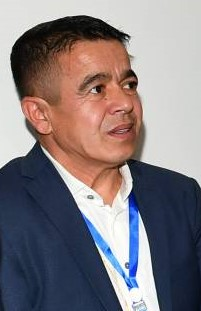

Personal information
- Nickname: "Dynamo"
- Nationality: Turkish
- Born: 14 July 1973 (age 53) Postnik, Kardzhali, Bulgaria
- Height: 1.50 m (4 ft 11 in)

Sport
- Country: Turkey
- Sport: Weightlifting
- Turned pro: 1992
- Retired: 2008

Achievements and titles
- Personal bests: Snatch: 147.5 kg (2003, WR); Clean and jerk: 175 kg (2003, WR); Total: 322.5 kg (2003, WR)
Medal record
Olympic Games
Gold medal – first place	1996 Atlanta	54 kg
Gold medal – first place	2000 Sydney	56 kg
Gold medal – first place	2004 Athens	56 kg
World Championships
Gold medal – first place	1994 Istanbul	54 kg
Gold medal – first place	1998 Lahti	56 kg
Gold medal – first place	1999 Athens	56 kg
Gold medal – first place	2001 Antalya	56 kg
Gold medal – first place	2003 Vancouver	62 kg
Silver medal – second place	1993 Melbourne	54 kg
Silver medal – second place	1995 Guangzhou	54 kg
European Championships
Gold medal – first place	1994 Sokolov	54 kg
Gold medal – first place	1995 Warsaw	54 kg
Gold medal – first place	1996 Stavanger	54 kg
Gold medal – first place	1997 Rijeka	54 kg
Gold medal – first place	1999 La Coruña	56 kg
Gold medal – first place	2000 Sofia	56 kg
Gold medal – first place	2001 Trencin	56 kg
Gold medal – first place	2003 Loutraki	62 kg
Gold medal – first place	2008 Lignano Sabbiadoro	56 kg
Bronze medal – third place	1991 Wladyslawowo	52 kg
Bronze medal – third place	1992 Szekszard	52 kg
Disqualified	2005 Sofia	62 kg

Halil Mutlu (born Halil Aliev (Bulgarian: Халил Алиев) on 14 July 1973 in Postnik, Bulgaria) is a Turkish former professional weightlifter with several World and Olympic championship titles. Mutlu is one of the six weightlifters who has achieved three consecutive gold medals at the Olympic Games. His weightlifting career includes five World championships, nine European championships and more than 20 world records at 52 kg (115 lb), 54 kg (119 lb) and 56 kg (123 lb) combined.

== Career ==
In 1994, he won both the European and world championships, titles that would soon become commonplace for him. He made his first Olympic appearance in 1992 in the 52 kg category and finished fifth. In 1996, in the 54 kg category, the reigning world champion and world record holder, Mutlu broke the world record in the snatch and went on to win the gold medal by 7.5 kg. At the 1999 World Championships he beat silver medal winner Adrian Jigău by around 20 kg and set a new world record. He remained undefeated until the 2000 Olympics in Sydney, where he was even more dominant than he had been in Atlanta. This time he set world records in both the snatch and the clean and jerk and won by 17.5 kg in the 56 kg category.

He was suffering from a shoulder injury in 2003 and temporarily moved to the 62 kg class. His career appeared in doubt after a torn right rotator cuff and ruptured biceps tendon sidelined him for most of 2002.

Mutlu dominated in his weight class since mid-1990s. By the time of the Athens Olympics in 2004, Mutlu won the world championship five times, although he had missed the 2002 season because of injury. In Athens he out lifted Wu Meijin of China by 5 kg in the snatch and then extended his lead in the jerk to earn victory by 7.5 kg. At 31, he captured his third consecutive gold medal at the Olympics in Athens.

=== Steroid ban ===
In 2005, Mutlu was banned from international competition by the International Weightlifting Federation for 2 years for use of anabolic steroid Nandrolone, although he insists that he never knowingly took steroids. The Turkish Weightlifting Federation itself had been suspended by the IWF for "repeated anti-doping violations" until May 2006. He pulled out of the 2008 Beijing Olympics stating that he was not able to "lift my targeted weight in practice." As a penalty, he was expelled from the ASKI.

== Personal life ==
Mutlu is married and has lived in Ankara, Turkey since the early 1990s. He is a member of the Konya Kombassan Club in Konya and is coached by Ibrahim Elmali. Beside weightlifting, Mutlu enjoys wrestling.

== Highlights ==
- World junior champion (1993),
- Five-time world champion (2003, 2001, 1999, 1998, 1994 - 1st; 1995, 1993 - 2nd.),
- Nine-time European champion (2005, 2003, 2001, 2000, 1999, 1997, 1996, 1995, 1994),
- 25 gold medals (8 Snatch, 8 Clean and Jerk, 9 Total) in total at European Championships, winner of the most gold medals second after David Rigert with 27 gold medals,
- Only fourth weightlifter to win three Olympic gold medals (2004, 2000, 1996),
- Named as the "Sportsman of the year 1999" in Turkey,
- He is one of five men in history to lift three times his bodyweight,

== Major results ==
Year	Venue	Weight	Snatch (kg)				Clean & Jerk (kg)				Total	Rank
Year	Venue	Weight	1	2	3	Rank	1	2	3	Rank	Total	Rank
Olympic Games
1992	Barcelona, Spain	52 kg	105.0	110.0	112.5	5	135.0	~~137.5~~	~~137.5~~	5	247.5	5
1996	Atlanta, United States	54 kg	125.0	130.0	132.5	1	~~152.5~~	152.5	155.0	1	287.5	1st place, gold medalist(s)
2000	Sydney, Australia	56 kg	130.0	135.0	138.0	1	160.0	167.5	~~170.0~~	1	305.0	1st place, gold medalist(s)
2004	Athens, Greece	56 kg	130.0	135.0	~~140.0~~	1	160.0	~~165.0~~	~~168.5~~	1	295.0	1st place, gold medalist(s)
World Championships
1993	Melbourne, Australia	54 kg	120.0	122.5	~~125.0~~	2nd place, silver medalist(s)	152.5	~~155.0~~	~~155.0~~	2nd place, silver medalist(s)	275.0	2nd place, silver medalist(s)
1994	Istanbul, Turkey	54 kg	122.5	127.5	130.0	1st place, gold medalist(s)	152.5	158.0	160.0	1st place, gold medalist(s)	290.0	1st place, gold medalist(s)
1995	Guangzhou, China	54 kg	125.0	127.5	130.0	1st place, gold medalist(s)	~~155.0~~	155.0	~~160.5~~	2nd place, silver medalist(s)	285.0	2nd place, silver medalist(s)
1998	Lahti, Finland	56 kg	130.0	~~135.0~~	135.0	1st place, gold medalist(s)	~~160.0~~	160.0	~~166.0~~	1st place, gold medalist(s)	295.0	1st place, gold medalist(s)
1999	Athens, Greece	56 kg	130.0	136.0	137.5	1st place, gold medalist(s)	160.0	166.0	—	1st place, gold medalist(s)	302.5	1st place, gold medalist(s)
2001	Antalya, Turkey	56 kg	132.5	138.5	—	1st place, gold medalist(s)	162.5	~~168.5~~	~~168.5~~	1st place, gold medalist(s)	300.0	1st place, gold medalist(s)
2003	Vancouver, Canada	62 kg	~~145.0~~	145.0	147.5	1st place, gold medalist(s)	~~175.0~~	175.0	~~180.0~~	1st place, gold medalist(s)	322.5	1st place, gold medalist(s)
European Championships
1990	Aalborg, Denmark	52 kg	102.5			4	127.5			5	230.0	4
1991	Wladyslawowo, Poland	52 kg	105.0			3rd place, bronze medalist(s)	135.0			3rd place, bronze medalist(s)	240.0	3rd place, bronze medalist(s)
1992	Szekszárd, Hungary	52 kg	110.0			3rd place, bronze medalist(s)	137.5			2nd place, silver medalist(s)	247.5	3rd place, bronze medalist(s)
1994	Sokolov, Czech Republic	54 kg	122.5			2nd place, silver medalist(s)	155.0			1st place, gold medalist(s)	277.5	1st place, gold medalist(s)
1995	Warsaw, Poland	54 kg	130.0			1st place, gold medalist(s)	155.0			2nd place, silver medalist(s)	285.0	1st place, gold medalist(s)
1996	Stavanger, Norway	54 kg	120.0	~~130.0~~	~~130.0~~	1st place, gold medalist(s)	145.0	155.0	~~160.0~~	1st place, gold medalist(s)	275.0	1st place, gold medalist(s)
1997	Rijeka, Croatia	54 kg	120.0	125.0	~~130.0~~	1st place, gold medalist(s)	150.0	155.0	—	1st place, gold medalist(s)	280.0	1st place, gold medalist(s)
1999	A Coruña, Spain	56 kg	130.0	~~135.5~~	135.5	1st place, gold medalist(s)	155.0	160.0	~~166.0~~	1st place, gold medalist(s)	295.5	1st place, gold medalist(s)
2000	Sofia, Bulgaria	56 kg	127.5	132.5	135.0	1st place, gold medalist(s)	157.5	166.5	—	1st place, gold medalist(s)	300.0	1st place, gold medalist(s)
2001	Trenčín, Slovakia	56 kg	125.0	130.0	135.0	1st place, gold medalist(s)	155.0	168.0	—	1st place, gold medalist(s)	302.5	1st place, gold medalist(s)
2003	Loutraki, Greece	62 kg	140.0	~~145.0~~	145.0	1st place, gold medalist(s)	170.0	175.0	~~180.0~~	1st place, gold medalist(s)	320.0	1st place, gold medalist(s)
2005	Sofia, Bulgaria	62 kg	135.0	140.0	—	DSQ	165.0	167.5	—	DSQ	307.5	DSQ
2008	Lignano Sabbiadoro, Italy	56 kg	~~120~~	~~120~~	120	1st place, gold medalist(s)	~~149~~	149	~~151~~	1st place, gold medalist(s)	269	1st place, gold medalist(s)
World Junior Championships
1991	Wolmirstedt, Germany	52 kg	105.0			2nd place, silver medalist(s)	127.5			4	232.5	4
1992	Varna, Bulgaria	52 kg	112.5			1st place, gold medalist(s)	137.5			2nd place, silver medalist(s)	250.0	2nd place, silver medalist(s)
1993	(Czech Republic) Cheb, Czech	54 kg	122.5			1st place, gold medalist(s)	152.5			1st place, gold medalist(s)	275.0	1st place, gold medalist(s)
European Junior Championships
1992	Cardiff, United Kingdom	52 kg	112.5			1st place, gold medalist(s)	135.0			1st place, gold medalist(s)	247.5	1st place, gold medalist(s)

== Medals ==
Olympics

Rank	Discipline	Snatch	Clean&Jerk	Total	Place	Date
Gold	–56 kg	135.0	160.0	295.0	Athens, GRE	Aug 17, 2004
Gold	–56 kg	137.5	167.5 WR	305.0	Sydney, AUS	Sep 16, 2000
Gold	–54 kg	132.5	155.0	287.5	Atlanta, GA, United States	1996

World Championships

Rank	Discipline	Snatch	Clean&Jerk	Total	Place	Date
Gold	–62 kg	147.5	175.0	322.5	Vancouver, CAN	Aug 6, 2003
Gold	–56 kg	138.5 WR	162.5	301.0	Antalya, TUR	Nov 4, 2001
Gold	–56 kg	137.5	165.0	302.5 WR	Athens, GRE	Nov 22, 1999
Gold	–56 kg	135.0	160.0	295.0	Lahti, FIN	1998
Gold	–54 kg	130.0			Guangzhou, CHN	1995
Silver	–54 kg		155.0	285.0	Guangzhou, CHN	1995
Gold	–54 kg	130.0	160.0	290.0	Istanbul, TUR	1994
Silver	–54 kg	122.5	152.5	275.0	Melbourne, AUS	1993

European Championships

Rank	Discipline	Snatch	Clean&Jerk	Total	Place	Date
Gold	–62 kg	140.0	167.5	307.5	Sofia, BUL	Apr 20, 2005
Gold	–56 kg	120.0	149.0	269.0	Lignano Sabbiadoro, ITA	Apr 14, 2008
Gold	–56 kg	138.5	168.0	305.0	Loutraki, GRE	Apr 15, 2003
Gold	–56 kg		168.0 WR		Trenčín, SVK	Apr 24, 2001
Gold	–56 kg	135.0	165.0	300.0	Sofia, BUL	2000
Gold	–56 kg	135.0	160.0	295.0	Coruña, ESP	1999

- CWR: Current world record
- WR: World record

== See also ==
- Athletes with most gold medals in one event at the Olympic Games
