= Marius Cihărean =

Romanian weightlifter (born 1975)

Personal information
- Born: 17 November 1975 (age 50) Pecica, Romania

Sport
- Sport: Weightlifting
Medal record
Representing Romania
European Championships
Bronze medal – third place	1996 Stavanger	-59 kg

Marius Cihărean (born 17 November 1975) is a featherweight weightlifter from Romania. He competed at the 1996 Summer Olympics, and won a bronze medal at the 1996 European Championships. He still competes in the masters category. His elder brother Traian is also a former Olympic weightlifter.
