= 2002 European Weightlifting Championships =

Competition held in Antalya, Turkey

2002 European Championships

The 2002 European Weightlifting Championships were held in Antalya, Turkey. It was the 81st edition of the event.

== Medal overview ==
=== Men ===
Event	Gold	Silver	Bronze
– 56 kg	(Belarus) Vitaly Derbenev	(Turkey) Sedat Artuç	(Moldova) Igor Grabucea
– 62 kg	(Greece) Leonidas Sabanis	(Bulgaria) Stefan Georgiev	(Ukraine) Oleksandr Likhvald
– 69 kg	(Bulgaria) Galabin Boevski	(Greece) Georgios Tzelilis	(Turkey) Reyhan Arabacioglu
– 77 kg	(Bulgaria) Georgi Markov	(Bulgaria) Zlatan Vanev	(Turkey) Mehmet Yılmaz
– 85 kg	(Georgia (country)) Giorgi Asanidze	(Poland) Mariusz Rytkowski	(Russia) Aslambek Ediev
– 94 kg	(Russia) Alexey Petrov	(Bulgaria) Milen Dobrev	(Azerbaijan) Nizami Pashayev
– 105 kg	(Bulgaria) Alan Tsagaev	(Ukraine) Denys Gotfrid	(Turkey) Bünyamin Sudaş
+ 105 kg	(Germany) Ronny Weller	(Poland) Paweł Najdek	(Ukraine) Oleksiy Kolokoltsev

=== Women ===
Event	Gold	Silver	Bronze
– 48 kg	(Ukraine) Olena Zinovieva	(Russia) Svetlana Ulyanova	(Turkey) Nurcan Taylan
– 53 kg	(Turkey) Aylin Dasdelen	(Turkey) Emine Bilgin	(Hungary) Anikó Ajkay
– 58 kg	(Bulgaria) Neli Yankova	(Hungary) Henrietta Raki	(Poland) Marieta Gotfryd
– 63 kg	(Ukraine) Nataliya Skakun	(Greece) Anastasia Tsakiri	(Bulgaria) Gergana Kirilova
– 69 kg	(Russia) Valentina Popova	(Russia) Svetlana Khabirova	(Greece) Maria Tatsi
– 75 kg	(Turkey) Sule Sahbaz	(Turkey) Aysel Özgür	(Hungary) Ilona Dankó
+ 75 kg	(Poland) Agata Wróbel	(Hungary) Viktória Varga	(Russia) Albina Khomich
