= Csilla Földi =

Hungarian weightlifter (born 1968)

Personal information
- Born: 25 August 1968 (age 58) Tata, Hungary

Sport
- Sport: Weightlifting
Medal record
Representing Hungary
European championships
Gold medal – first place	1989 Manchester	-44 kg
Gold medal – first place	1990 Santa Cruz	-44 kg
Gold medal – first place	1991 Varna	-44 kg
Gold medal – first place	1992 Loures	-44 kg
Gold medal – first place	1993 Valencia	-46 kg
Silver medal – second place	1995 Beer Sheva	-50 kg
Bronze medal – third place	1994 Rome	-46 kg
Bronze medal – third place	1996 Prague	-50 kg

Csilla Földi (born 25 August 1968) is a retired Hungarian weightlifter who was active between 1987 and 2000. She won eight medals at the European championships, including five golds in 1989–1993. Her father Imre Földi was a 1972 Olympic champion in weightlifting.
