= Mariusz Rytkowski =

Polish weightlifter

Personal information
- Nationality: Polish
- Born: 26 July 1976 (age 48); Mińsk Mazowiecki, Poland

Sport
- Sport: Weightlifting

Mariusz Rytkowski (born 26 July 1976) is a Polish weightlifter. He competed in the men's light heavyweight event at the 2000 Summer Olympics.
