= Kostyantyn Piliyev =

Ukrainian weightlifter

Kostyantyn Piliyev (born 28 February 1983) is a Ukrainian weightlifter. He competed for Ukraine at the 2012 Summer Olympics.
