= Bidzina Mikiashvili =

Georgian weightlifter

Personal information
- Nationality: Georgian
- Born: 28 May 1968 (age 56)

Sport
- Sport: Weightlifting

Bidzina Mikiashvili (born 28 May 1968) is a Georgian weightlifter. He competed in the men's light heavyweight event at the 1996 Summer Olympics.
