= Şule Şahbaz =

Turkish weightlifter (born 1978)

Personal information
- Nationality: Turkish
- Born: 2 October 1978 (age 47)

Sport
- Country: Turkey
- Sport: Weightlifting
- Event: –75 kg
Medal record
World Championships
Silver medal – second place	1998 Lahti	– 75 kg
Silver medal – second place	2001 Antalya	– 75 kg
European Championships
Gold medal – first place	2002 Antalya	– 75 kg
Silver medal – second place	1999 La Coruña	– 75 kg
Silver medal – second place	2004 Kyiv	– 75 kg

Şule Şahbaz (born 2 October 1978) is a former Turkish weightlifter who competed in the -75 kg division.

She won a gold medal at the 2002 Weightlifting Championship, silver medals at the 1999 and 2004 European Championships and a bronze medal at the 2003 World Championships.

She was scheduled to compete in the women's 75 kg weight class at the 2004 Summer Olympics, but tested positive for a banned substance ahead of the Olympics and was disqualified.

== See also ==
- List of sportspeople sanctioned for doping offences
