= Zlatina Atanasova =

Bulgarian weightlifter

Personal information
- Full name: Zlatina Atanasova Dimitrova
- Born: 5 June 1980 (age 46) Burgas, Bulgaria
- Height: 165 cm (5 ft 5 in)
- Weight: 58 kg (128 lb)

Sport
- Country: Bulgaria
- Sport: Weightlifting
- Weight class: 58 kg
- Team: National team
- Updated on 11 September 2016

Zlatina Atanasova Dimitrova (Златина Атанасова Димитрова, born 5 June 1980 in Burgas) is a Bulgarian weightlifter, competing in the 69 kg category and representing Bulgaria at international competitions.

She participated at the 2004 Summer Olympics in the 58 kg event.

== Major results ==
Year	Venue	Weight	Snatch (kg)				Clean & Jerk (kg)				Total	Rank
Year	Venue	Weight	1	2	3	Rank	1	2	3	Rank	Total	Rank
Summer Olympics
2004	Athens, Italy	58 kg	90	~~95~~	~~95~~	—N/a	115	~~125~~	~~125~~	—N/a	205.0	12
