= Petar Petrov (weightlifter) =

Bulgarian weightlifter

Personal information
- Nationality: Bulgarian
- Born: 16 October 1974 (age 50); Sliven, Bulgaria

Sport
- Sport: Weightlifting

Petar Petrov (Bulgarian: Петър Петров, born 16 October 1974) is a Bulgarian weightlifter. He competed in the men's featherweight event at the 1996 Summer Olympics.
