= László Tancsics =

Hungarian weightlifter

Personal information
- Nationality: Hungarian
- Born: 19 May 1978 (age 46); Zalaegerszeg, Hungary

Sport
- Sport: Weightlifting

László Tancsics (born 19 May 1978) is a Hungarian weightlifter. He competed in the men's bantamweight event at the 2004 Summer Olympics.
