= Dmitry Smirnov (weightlifter) =

Russian weightlifter

Personal information
- Nationality: Russian
- Born: 19 July 1973 (age 51)

Sport
- Sport: Weightlifting

Dmitry Smirnov (born 19 July 1973) is a Russian weightlifter. He competed in the men's heavyweight I event at the 1996 Summer Olympics.
