= Vladislav Lukanin =

Russian weightlifter

Personal information
- Native name: Владислав Луканин
- Nationality: Russian

Sport
- Sport: Weightlifting

Vladislav Lukanin (Russian: Владислав Луканин) is a Russian weightlifter. He has competed in weightlifting competitions representing Russia.

== See also ==
- International Weightlifting Federation
