= Igor Grabucea =

Moldovan weightlifter (born 1976)

Personal information
- Born: 29 April 1976 (age 50)
Medal record
Men's Weightlifting
Representing Moldova
European Championships
Silver medal – second place	2006 Władysławowo	– 56 kg
Bronze medal – third place	2007 Strasbourg	– 56 kg
Bronze medal – third place	2009 Bucharest	– 56 kg

Igor Grabucea (born 29 April 1976) is a Moldovan weightlifter. His personal best is 267.5 kg.

He competed in Weightlifting at the 2008 Summer Olympics in the 56 kg division finishing fourteenth with 239 kg.

He is 5 ft 1 inches tall and weighs 123 lb.
