= Andrzej Kozłowski =

Polish weightlifter

Personal information
- Nationality: Polish
- Born: 29 June 1968 (age 56); Kyiv, Ukrainian SSR, Soviet Union

Sport
- Sport: Weightlifting

Andrzej Kozłowski (born 29 June 1968) is a Polish weightlifter. He competed in the men's middleweight event at the 1992 Summer Olympics.
