= Yuliya Dovhal =

Ukrainian-Azerbaijani weightlifter

Personal information
- Full name: Yuliya Vitaliïvna Dovhal
- Nationality: Ukraine; Azerbaijan
- Born: 2 June 1983 (age 43) Kirovohrad, Ukrainian SSR, Soviet Union
- Height: 1.67 m (5 ft 5 1/2 in)
- Weight: 96 kg (212 lb)

Sport
- Sport: Weightlifting
- Event: +75 kg
- Club: Kolos Odeska Oblast

Yuliya Vitaliïvna Dovhal (Ukrainian: Юлія Віталіївна Довгаль; born June 2, 1983, in Kirovohrad) is a Ukrainian-Azerbaijani weightlifter.

== Career ==
Dovhal represented Ukraine at the 2008 Summer Olympics in Beijing, where she competed for the women's super heavyweight category (+75 kg), along with her compatriot Olha Korobka, who eventually won the silver medal. Dovhal placed seventh in this event, as she successfully lifted 118 kg in the single-motion snatch, and hoisted 140 kg in the two-part, shoulder-to-overhead clean and jerk, for a total of 258 kg.
