= European Weightlifting Championships =

International weightlifting competition

- Status: Active
- Genre: Sports Event
- Date: Usually April
- Begins: 1896
- Frequency: Annual
- Location: Various
- Inaugurated: 1896
- Founder: EWF
- Most recent: Batumi 2026
- Previous event: Batumi 2026
- Next event: Antalya 2027
- Participants: 49 Countries
- Area: Europe
- Major events: Weightlifting
- Organiser: EWF
- Member: 46 Full Members; 3 Affiliated Members
- Website: https://ewf.sport/

European Weightlifting Championships is an annual event organised by the European Weightlifting Federation (EWF). It has been held since 1896. A separate event for women was held from 1988 to 1997, after which both championships have been held as one event.

== Format ==
1896-1924: Different combined events until 1924

1896-1907: No bodyweight categories

Triathlon and Duathlon 1929 - 1992

1929 - 1972 the competed triathlon included the exercises press, snatch and clean & jerk. Except 1933 - left hand snatch, right hand snatch, two hand press, two hand snatch, two hand clean & jerk. From 1973 onwards, it is reduced to a duathlon after deletion of press. Since 1969, there are also European Championship medals awarded in the single exercises.

In 1993, 2018 and 2025 the IWF introduced new bodyweight categories.

== Editions ==
https://intersportstats.com/competition_types/303

Results:

No. M	No. W	Edition	Host country	Host city	Events
1		1896	Netherlands	Rotterdam	1
2		1897	Austria	Vienna	1
3		1898	Netherlands	Amsterdam	1
4		1900	Netherlands	Rotterdam	1
5		1901	Netherlands	Rotterdam	1
6		1902	Netherlands	The Hague	1
7		1903	Netherlands	Amsterdam	1
8		1904	Netherlands	Amsterdam	1
9		1905	Netherlands	The Hague	1
10		1906	Denmark	Copenhagen	1
11		1907	Austria	Vienna	2
12		1908	Sweden	Malmö	1
13		1909	Germany	Dresden	2
14		1910	Hungary	Budapest	4
15		1911	Germany	Leipzig	2
16		1912	Austria	Vienna	4
17		1913	Austria	Brno	4
18		1914	Austria	Vienna	5
19		1921	Germany	Offenbach	5
20		1924	Germany	Neunkirchen	7
21		1929	Austria	Vienna	5
22		1930	Germany	Munich	5
23		1931	Luxembourg	Luxembourg	5
24		1933	Germany	Essen	5
25		1934	Italy	Genoa	5
26		1935	France	Paris	5
27		1947	Finland	Helsinki	6
28		1948	United Kingdom	London	6
29		1949	Netherlands	The Hague	6
30		1950	France	Paris	6
31		1951	Italy	Milan	7
32		1952	Finland	Helsinki	7
33		1953	Sweden	Stockholm	7
34		1954	Austria	Vienna	7
35		1955	West Germany	Munich	7
36		1956	Finland	Helsinki	7
37		1957	Poland	Katowice	7
38		1958	Sweden	Stockholm	7
39		1959	Poland	Warsaw	7
40		1960	Italy	Milan	7
41		1961	Austria	Vienna	7
42		1962	Hungary	Budapest	7
43		1963	Sweden	Stockholm	7
44		1964	Soviet Union	Moscow	7
45		1965	Bulgaria	Sofia	7
46		1966	East Germany	Berlin	7
47		1968	Soviet Union	Leningrad	7
48		1969	Poland	Warsaw	36
49		1970	Hungary	Szombathely	36
50		1971	Bulgaria	Sofia	36
51		1972	Romania	Constanţa	36
52		1973	Spain	Madrid	27
53		1974	Italy	Verona	27
54		1975	Soviet Union	Moscow	27
55		1976	East Germany	Berlin	27
56		1977	West Germany	Stuttgart	30
57		1978	Czechoslovakia	Havířov	30
58		1979	Bulgaria	Varna	30
59		1980	Yugoslavia	Belgrade	30
60		1981	France	Lille	30
61		1982	Yugoslavia	Ljubljana	30
62		1983	Soviet Union	Moscow	30
63		1984	Spain	Vitoria	30
64		1985	Poland	Katowice	30
65		1986	East Germany	Karl-Marx-Stadt	30
66		1987	France	Reims	30
67		1988	United Kingdom	Cardiff	30
–	1	1988	San Marino	City of San Marino	27
68		1989	Greece	Athens	30
–	2	1989	United Kingdom	Manchester	27
69		1990	Denmark	Ålborg	30
–	3	1990	Spain	Santa Cruz de Tenerife	27
70		1991	Poland	Władysławowo	30
–	4	1991	Bulgaria	Varna	27
71		1992	Hungary	Szekszárd	30
–	5	1992	Portugal	Loures	27
72		1993	Bulgaria	Sofia	30
–	6	1993	Spain	Valencia	27
73		1994	Czechoslovakia	Sokolov	30
–	7	1994	Italy	Rome	27
74		1995	Poland	Warsaw	30
–	8	1995	Israel	Beer Sheva	27
75		1996	Norway	Stavanger	30
–	9	1996	Czech Republic	Prague	27
76		1997	Croatia	Rijeka	30
–	10	1997	Spain	Sevilla	27
77	11	1998	Germany	Riesa	45
78	12	1999	Spain	A Coruña	45
79	13	2000	Bulgaria	Sofia	45
80	14	2001	Slovakia	Trenčín	45
81	15	2002	Turkey	Antalya	45
82	16	2003	Greece	Loutraki	45
83	17	2004	Ukraine	Kyiv	45
84	18	2005	Bulgaria	Sofia	45
85	19	2006	Poland	Władysławowo	45
86	20	2007	France	Strasbourg	45
87	21	2008	Italy	Lignano Sabbiadoro	45
88	22	2009	Romania	Bucharest	45
89	23	2010	Belarus	Minsk	45
90	24	2011	Russia	Kazan	45
91	25	2012	Turkey	Antalya	45
92	26	2013	Albania	Tirana	45
93	27	2014	Israel	Tel Aviv	45
94	28	2015	Georgia	Tbilisi	45
95	29	2016	Norway	Førde	45
96	30	2017	Croatia	Split	48
97	31	2018	Romania	Bucharest	48
98	32	2019	Georgia	Batumi	60
99	33	2021	Russia	Moscow	60
100	34	2022	Albania	Tirana	60
101	35	2023	Armenia	Yerevan	60
102	36	2024	Bulgaria	Sofia	60
103	37	2025	Moldova	Chișinău	60
104	38	2026	Georgia	Batumi	48
105	39	2027	Turkey	Antalya	

== Team ranking ==
- History - Team ranking system
- Team ranking was started from 1949
- 1–7 August 1948 FIH Congress, London : For the team classification 5-3-1 points are distributed for the 1st to the 3rd place.
- 2–7 November 1957 FIHC Congress, Teheran : For the team classification, there are distributed 10-6-4-3-2-1 points for the first to the sixth place.
- 3–24 May 1958 Tokyo : For the team classification 7-5-4-3-2-1 points are distributed for the 1st to the 6th place.
- 4- 1973 : For the team classification 12-9-8-7-6-5-4-3-2-1 points are distributed for the 1st to 10th place (only for the total).
- 5- 1977 : For the team classification 12-9-8-7-6-5-4-3-2-1 points are distributed for the 1st to 10th place for the individual lifts and the total.
- 6- 12–14 January 1984 IWF Executive Board Meeting, Herzogenaurach. 27 July, IWF Congress, Los Angeles: For the team classification 16-14-13-12-11-10-9- 8-7-6-5-4-3-2-1 points are distributed for the 1st to 15th place.
- 7–1 May 1996 IWF Executive Board Meeting, Warsaw : For the team classification 28-25-23-22-21-20-19-18-17-16-15-14-13-12-11-10-9-8-7-6-5-4-3-2-1 points are distributed for the 1st to 25th place.
- 10 and 11 December 1996, IWF Congress, Athens: Two-Year-Suspension for a first doping offence.

Year	Host	Men			Women		
Year	Host	1	2	3	1	2	3
1998	Riesa, Germany	Bulgaria 549	Russia 530	Germany 458	Hungary 514	Russia 471	Bulgaria 467
1999	Seville, Spain	Turkey 682	Spain 608	Russia 524	Turkey 647	Greece 586	Spain 584
2000	Sofia, Bulgaria	Bulgaria 610	Turkey 525	Russia 464	Bulgaria 522	Russia 438	Ukraine 343
2001	Trenčín, Slovakia	Russia 538	Turkey 504	Poland 498	Russia 492	Hungary 483	Spain 400
2002	Antalya, Turkey	Bulgaria 599	Turkey 486	Russia 368	Turkey 522	Russia 496	Poland 466
2003	Loutraki, Greece	Turkey 598	Russia 553	Bulgaria 544	Turkey 521	Russia 501	Bulgaria 441
2004	Kyiv, Ukraine	Turkey 591	Bulgaria 442	Russia 416	Turkey 478	Poland 438	Bulgaria 436
2005	Sofia, Bulgaria	Bulgaria 519	Turkey 488	Russia 473	Russia 567	Poland 456	Bulgaria 451
2006	Władysławowo, Poland	Belarus 486	Poland 485	Bulgaria 435	Russia 483	Ukraine 434	Poland 386
2007	Strasbourg, France	Russia 546	Belarus 523	Turkey 506	Russia 486	Ukraine 459	Turkey 448
2008	Lignano, Italy	Russia 598	France 457	Azerbaijan 427	Ukraine 471	Russia 454	Turkey 449
2009	Bucharest, Romania	Russia	Turkey	Azerbaijan	Russia	~~Turkey~~	Ukraine
2010	Minsk, Belarus	Turkey 538	Armenia 496	Poland 460	Russia 498	~~Turkey 497~~	Poland 416
2011	Kazan, Russia	Turkey 470	Poland 467	Moldova 431	Russia 559	~~Turkey 517~~	Poland 413
2012	Antalya, Turkey	Moldova 500	Russia 482	~~Turkey 473~~	Russia 530	~~Turkey 441~~	Poland 417
2013	Tirana, Albania	Russia 638	Bulgaria 507	Albania 355	Poland 469	France 311	Italy 310
2014	Tel Aviv, Israel	~~Russia 524~~	Bulgaria 535	Poland 491	~~Russia 539~~	Ukraine 443	Poland 443
2015	(Georgia (country)) Tbilisi, Georgia	Russia 478	Armenia 421	Turkey 416	Ukraine 478	~~Russia 421~~	~~Turkey 416~~
2016	Førde, Norway	Russia 524	Armenia 503	Turkey 501	Armenia 449	Ukraine 435	~~Turkey 399~~
2017	Split, Croatia	Russia 501	Turkey 462	Poland 399	~~Russia 588~~	Ukraine 492	Spain 464
2018	Bucharest, Romania	Georgia 575	Romania 528	Poland 451	Romania 512	Poland 429	Italy 412
2019	(Georgia (country)) Batumi, Georgia	Georgia 636	~~Belarus 634~~	Armenia 596	Russia 736	Turkey 575	Romania 480
2021	Moscow, Russia	Bulgaria 685	Armenia 620	Georgia 612	Russia 699	Turkey 616	Ukraine 600
2022	Tirana, Albania	Bulgaria 746	Armenia 667	Georgia 647	Turkey 690	Ukraine 686	Great Britain 381
2023	Yerevan, Armenia	Armenia 762	Georgia 695	Turkey 587	Turkey 650	Ukraine 647	Armenia 554
2024	Sofia, Bulgaria	Bulgaria 696	Armenia 669	Turkey 628	Ukraine 654	Turkey 535	Romania 485
2025	Chișinău, Moldova	Armenia 652	Georgia 648	Turkey 571	Armenia 581	Turkey 569	Great Britain 541
2026	(Georgia (country)) Batumi, Georgia	Armenia 567	Bulgaria 540	Turkey 539	Ukraine 463	Turkey 442	Armenia 424

== All-time medal table (1914–2026) ==
Ranking by Big (Total result) medals:

https://intersportstats.com/competition_types/303

Rank	Nation	Gold	Silver	Bronze	Total
1	Soviet Union	202	89	34	325
2	Bulgaria	193	143	103	439
3	Russia	90	86	51	227
4	Turkey	78	49	63	190
5	Poland	50	78	100	228
6	Armenia	45	53	42	140
7	Ukraine	44	43	44	131
8	Romania	37	48	47	132
9	France	36	53	47	136
10	Germany	35	54	41	130
11	Hungary	30	61	64	155
12	Belarus	25	19	29	73
13	Italy	24	37	36	97
14	Great Britain	22	23	22	67
15	Georgia	18	32	14	64
16	Greece	18	24	27	69
17	Austria	13	16	31	60
18	Latvia	13	5	12	30
19	Spain	11	30	34	75
20	East Germany	9	24	53	86
21	Albania	9	14	13	36
22	Moldova	8	11	21	40
23	Finland	7	14	25	46
24	Azerbaijan	7	5	7	19
25	Sweden	6	9	15	30
26	Unified Team	6	3	3	12
27	Norway	5	4	3	12
28	West Germany	4	8	8	20
–	Individual Neutral Athletes	4	7	7	18
29	Belgium	4	6	9	19
30	Denmark	4	4	1	9
31	Egypt	4	0	2	6
32	Czechoslovakia	2	15	32	49
33	Croatia	2	1	1	4
34	Netherlands	2	0	0	2
35	Lithuania	1	4	4	9
36	Portugal	1	3	2	6
37	Slovakia	1	2	4	7
38	Czech Republic	1	2	2	5
39	Luxembourg	1	1	0	2
40	Switzerland	1	0	5	6
41	Iceland	1	0	0	1
42	Israel	0	2	4	6
43	Estonia	0	2	1	3
44	Cyprus	0	1	2	3
45	Serbia	0	0	3	3
46	Bosnia and Herzegovina	0	0	1	1
46	Ireland	0	0	1	1
Totals (47 entries)		1,074	1,085	1,070	3,229

== See also ==
- List of European Weightlifting Championships medalists
- European Junior & U23 Weightlifting Championships
