= 2012 in weightlifting =

This article lists the main weightlifting events and their results for 2012.

== 2012 Summer Olympics (IWF) ==
- The results below came from the IWF's 2012 Summer Olympics Results Page
  - Men's 56 kg: (gold) (North Korea) Om Yun-chol; (silver) (China) Wu Jingbiao; (bronze) (Azerbaijan) Valentin Hristov
  - Men's 62 kg: (gold) (North Korea) Kim Un-guk; (silver) (Colombia) Óscar Figueroa; (bronze) (Indonesia) Eko Yuli Irawan
  - Men's 69 kg: (gold) (China) Lin Qingfeng; (silver) (Indonesia) Triyatno; (bronze) (Romania) Răzvan Martin
  - Men's 77 kg: (gold) (China) Lü Xiaojun; (silver) (China) Lu Haojie; (bronze) (Cuba) Iván Cambar
  - Men's 85 kg: (gold) (Poland) Adrian Zieliński; (silver) (Iran) Kianoush Rostami; (bronze) (Egypt) Tarek Yehia
  - Men's 94 kg: (gold) (Iran) Saeid Mohammadpour; (silver) (South Korea) Kim Min-jae; (bronze) (Poland) Tomasz Zieliński
  - Men's 105 kg: (gold) (Ukraine) Oleksiy Torokhtiy; (silver) (Iran) Navab Nassirshalal; (bronze) (Poland) Bartłomiej Bonk
  - Men's +105 kg: (gold) (Iran) Behdad Salimi; (silver) (Iran) Sajjad Anoushiravani; (bronze) (Russia) Ruslan Albegov
  - Women's 48 kg: (gold) (China) Wang Mingjuan; (silver) (Japan) Hiromi Miyake; (bronze) (North Korea) Ryang Chun-hwa
  - Women's 53 kg: (gold) (Chinese Taipei) Hsu Shu-ching; (silver) (Indonesia) Citra Febrianti; (bronze) (Ukraine) Iulia Paratova
  - Women's 58 kg: (gold) (China) Li Xueying; (silver) (Thailand) Pimsiri Sirikaew; (bronze) (Thailand) Rattikan Gulnoi
  - Women's 63 kg: (gold) (Canada) Christine Girard; (silver) (Bulgaria) Milka Maneva; (bronze) (Mexico) Luz Acosta
  - Women's 69 kg: (gold) (North Korea) Rim Jong-sim; (silver) (Romania) Roxana Cocoș; (bronze) (Kazakhstan) Anna Nurmukhambetova
  - Women's 75 kg: (gold) (Spain) Lydia Valentín; (silver) (Egypt) Abeer Abdelrahman; (bronze) (Cameroon) Madias Nzesso
  - Women's +75 kg: (gold) (China) Zhou Lulu; (silver) (Russia) Tatiana Kashirina; (bronze) (South Korea) Jang Mi-ran

== World & Grand Prix weightlifting championships ==
- May 10 – ?: 2012 World Junior Weightlifting Championships in Antigua Guatemala
  - China won both the gold and overall medal tallies.
- September 18 – ?: 2012 World Youth Weightlifting Championships in (Slovakia) Košice
  - Russia and China won 3 gold medals each. Russia won the overall medal tally.
- October 12: – ?: 2012 IWF Grand Prix #1 in (Russia) Saint Petersburg
  - Men's 94 kg: (Russia) Egor Klimonov
  - Men's 105 kg: (Russia) Gennady Muratov
  - Men's +105 kg: (Czech Republic) Jiří Orság
  - Women's 75 kg: (Russia) Olga Zubova
  - Women's +75 kg: (Russia) Tatiana Kashirina
- November 5 – ?: 2012 World University Weightlifting Championships in (Israel) Eilat
  - Russia won both the gold and overall medal tallies.
- December 14 – ?: 2012 IWF Grand Prix #2 in (Azerbaijan) Baku
  - Men's 62 kg: (Azerbaijan) Valentin Hristov
  - Men's 69 kg: (Azerbaijan) Firidun Guliyev
  - Women's 53 kg: (Moldova) Cristina Iovu
  - Women's 58 kg: (Russia) Tatiana Aleeva

== Continental & regional weightlifting championships ==
- March 20 – ?: 2012 Pan American Junior Weightlifting Championships in Medellín
  - Colombia won the gold medal tally. Colombia and Venezuela won 11 overall medals each.
- March 29 – ?: 2012 African Weightlifting Championships in (Kenya) Nairobi
  - Nigeria won both the gold and overall medal tallies.
- April 9 – ?: 2012 European Weightlifting Championships in (Turkey) Antalya
  - Russia won both the gold and overall medal tallies.
- April 22 – ?: 2012 Asian Weightlifting Championships in (South Korea) Pyeongtaek
  - China won both the gold and overall medal tallies.
- May 10 – ?: 2012 Pan American Weightlifting Championships in Antigua Guatemala
  - Colombia won both the gold and overall medal tallies.
- June 4 – ?: 2012 Oceania Senior, Junior, & Youth Weightlifting Championships in Apia
  - Senior: Samoa won the gold medal tally. Australia won the overall medal tally.
  - Junior: Samoa and New Zealand won 3 gold medals each. Samoa won the overall medals tally.
  - Youth: New Zealand won the gold medal tally. Australia won the overall medal tally.
- June 4 – ?: 2012 Commonwealth Senior, Junior, & Youth Weightlifting Championships in (Samoa) Apia
  - Senior: India won both the gold and overall medal tallies.
  - Junior: India won both the gold and overall medal tallies.
  - Youth: India won both the gold and overall medal tallies.
- June 18 – ?: 2012 Pan American Youth Weightlifting Championships in (Chile) Viña del Mar
  - Mexico won the gold medal tally. Colombia won the overall medal tally.
- August 25 – ?: 2012 European Youth Weightlifting Championships in (Romania) Constanța
  - Armenia won the gold medal tally. Russia won the overall medal tally.
- October 24 – ?: 2012 South American Senior & Junior Weightlifting Championships in Maracaibo
  - Senior: Venezuela won both the gold and overall medal tallies.
  - Junior: Venezuela won both the gold and overall medal tallies.
- November 8 – ?: 2012 Asian Junior & Youth Weightlifting Championships in (Myanmar) Yangon
  - Junior: China and North Korea won 5 gold medals each. China won the overall medal tally.
  - Youth: China won the gold medal tally. Chinese Taipei won the overall medal tally.
- November 18 – ?: 2012 African Junior & Youth Weightlifting Championships in Tunis
  - Junior: Egypt won the gold medal tally. Tunisia won the overall medal tally.
  - Youth: Tunisia won both the gold and overall medal tallies.
- November 29 – ?: 2012 European Junior Weightlifting Championships in (Israel) Eilat
  - Russia and Romania won 4 gold medals each. Russia won the overall medal tally.
