= 2018 European Weightlifting Championships =

International weightlifting competition

2018 European Senior Weightlifting Championships
- Host city: Bucharest, Romania
- Dates: 26 March – 1 April
- Main venue: Complexul Olimpic Izvorani
- Participation: 208 athletes from 30 nations
- Events: 16

The 2018 European Weightlifting Championships was held at the Complexul Olimpic Izvorani in Bucharest, Romania from 26 March to 1 April 2018.

Some countries were banned from competing at the championships due to their history of doping at previous Olympic Games. International Weightlifting Federation rules state that any country that had three positive tests uncovered by the International Olympic Committee during re-testing of stored urine samples for banned substances from the 2008 Olympic Games and 2012 Olympic Games would be banned. The banned countries are: Russia, Armenia, Turkey, Moldova, Ukraine, Belarus and Azerbaijan.

== Medals tables ==
=== Results including snatch and clean & jerk medals ===
* Host nation (Romania)

Rank	Nation	Gold	Silver	Bronze	Total
1	Romania*	10	7	9	26
2	Georgia	10	3	2	15
3	Poland	7	6	6	19
4	Spain	5	2	6	13
5	Latvia	3	1	2	6
6	Albania	3	0	0	3
7	Italy	2	8	3	13
8	Sweden	2	3	1	6
9	Germany	2	1	1	4
10	France	1	6	2	9
11	Bulgaria	1	5	3	9
12	Hungary	1	2	2	5
13	Austria	1	1	3	5
14	Czech Republic	0	2	1	3
15	Belgium	0	1	0	1
16	Finland	0	0	5	5
17	Israel	0	0	1	1
17	Slovakia	0	0	1	1
Totals (18 entries)		48	48	48	144

=== Total results ===
* Host nation (Romania)

Rank	Nation	Gold	Silver	Bronze	Total
1	Georgia	4	0	0	4
2	Romania*	3	2	4	9
3	Poland	3	2	2	7
4	Spain	2	0	2	4
5	Germany	1	1	0	2
5	Sweden	1	1	0	2
7	Latvia	1	0	1	2
8	Albania	1	0	0	1
9	Italy	0	3	1	4
10	Bulgaria	0	2	1	3
10	France	0	2	1	3
12	Austria	0	1	1	2
12	Hungary	0	1	1	2
14	Czech Republic	0	1	0	1
15	Finland	0	0	2	2
Totals (15 entries)		16	16	16	48

== Medal overview ==
=== Men ===
Event		Gold		Silver		Bronze	
– 56 kg	Snatch	Josué Brachi (ESP)	116 kg	Mirco Scarantino (ITA)	115 kg	Goderdzi Berdelidze (GEO)	112 kg
– 56 kg	Clean & Jerk	Mirco Scarantino (ITA)	138 kg	Josué Brachi (ESP)	138 kg	Ilie Ciotoiu (ROU)	137 kg
– 56 kg	Total	Josué Brachi (ESP)	254 kg	Mirco Scarantino (ITA)	253 kg	Ilie Ciotoiu (ROU)	247 kg
– 62 kg	Snatch	Stilyan Grozdev (BUL)	135 kg	Shota Mishvelidze (GEO)	134 kg	Vladimir Urumov (BUL)	130 kg
– 62 kg	Clean & Jerk	Shota Mishvelidze (GEO)	165 kg	Stilyan Grozdev (BUL)	158 kg	Ionuț Ilie (ROU)	154 kg
– 62 kg	Total	Shota Mishvelidze (GEO)	299 kg	Stilyan Grozdev (BUL)	293 kg	Ionuț Ilie (ROU)	283 kg
– 69 kg	Snatch	Briken Calja (ALB)	146 kg	Mirko Zanni (ITA)	143 kg	David Sánchez (ESP)	141 kg
– 69 kg	Clean & Jerk	Briken Calja (ALB)	175 kg	Paul Dumitraşcu (ROU)	174 kg	Robert Joachim (GER)	173 kg
– 69 kg	Total	Briken Calja (ALB)	321 kg	Robert Joachim (GER)	311 kg	David Sánchez (ESP)	309 kg
– 77 kg	Snatch	Răzvan Martin (ROU)	158 kg	Andrés Mata (ESP)	157 kg	Ritvars Suharevs (LAT)	156 kg
– 77 kg	Clean & Jerk	Nico Müller (GER)	191 kg	Răzvan Martin (ROU)	185 kg	Andrés Mata (ESP)	185 kg
– 77 kg	Total	Nico Müller (GER)	346 kg	Răzvan Martin (ROU)	343 kg	Andrés Mata (ESP)	342 kg
– 85 kg	Snatch	Revaz Davitadze (GEO)	163 kg	Kacper Kłos (POL)	153 kg	Alberto Fernández (ESP)	150 kg
– 85 kg	Clean & Jerk	Brandon Vautard (FRA)	191 kg	Revaz Davitadze (GEO)	190 kg	Kacper Kłos (POL)	189 kg
– 85 kg	Total	Revaz Davitadze (GEO)	353 kg	Kacper Kłos (POL)	342 kg	Brandon Vautard (FRA)	335 kg
– 94 kg	Snatch	Nicolae Onică (ROU)	171 kg	Łukasz Grela (POL)	169 kg	Artur Mugurdumov (ISR)	161 kg
– 94 kg	Clean & Jerk	Nicolae Onică (ROU)	210 kg	Vadims Koževņikovs (LAT)	198 kg	Eero Retulainen (FIN)	192 kg
– 94 kg	Total	Nicolae Onică (ROU)	381 kg	Łukasz Grela (POL)	357 kg	Vadims Koževņikovs (LAT)	352 kg
– 105 kg	Snatch	Sargis Martirosjan (AUT)	182 kg	Georgi Shikov (BUL)	176 kg	Arkadiusz Michalski (POL)	175 kg
– 105 kg	Clean & Jerk	Arkadiusz Michalski (POL)	221 kg	Georgi Shikov (BUL)	212 kg	Matej Kováč (SVK)	206 kg
– 105 kg	Total	Arkadiusz Michalski (POL)	396 kg	Georgi Shikov (BUL)	388 kg	Sargis Martirosjan (AUT)	384 kg
+ 105 kg	Snatch	Lasha Talakhadze (GEO)	210 kg	Irakli Turmanidze (GEO)	192 kg	Péter Nagy (HUN)	191 kg
+ 105 kg	Clean & Jerk	Lasha Talakhadze (GEO)	247 kg	Jiří Orság (CZE)	236 kg	Kamil Kučera (CZE)	226 kg
+ 105 kg	Total	Lasha Talakhadze (GEO)	457 kg	Jiří Orság (CZE)	417 kg	Péter Nagy (HUN)	416 kg

=== Women ===
Event		Gold		Silver		Bronze	
– 48 kg	Snatch	Elena Andrieș (ROU)	79 kg	Anaïs Michel (FRA)	78 kg	Alessandra Pagliaro (ITA)	74 kg
– 48 kg	Clean & Jerk	Elena Andrieș (ROU)	100 kg	Anaïs Michel (FRA)	96 kg	Daniela Pandova (BUL)	94 kg
– 48 kg	Total	Elena Andrieș (ROU)	179 kg	Anaïs Michel (FRA)	174 kg	Daniela Pandova (BUL)	165 kg
– 53 kg	Snatch	Joanna Łochowska (POL)	88 kg	Jennifer Lombardo (ITA)	84 kg	Manon Lorentz (FRA)	83 kg
– 53 kg	Clean & Jerk	Joanna Łochowska (POL)	108 kg	Jennifer Lombardo (ITA)	107 kg	Giorgia Russo (ITA)	106 kg
– 53 kg	Total	Joanna Łochowska (POL)	196 kg	Jennifer Lombardo (ITA)	191 kg	Giorgia Russo (ITA)	186 kg
– 58 kg	Snatch	Rebeka Koha (LAT)	100 kg	Andreea Penciu (ROU)	88 kg	Angelica Roos (SWE)	85 kg
– 58 kg	Clean & Jerk	Rebeka Koha (LAT)	120 kg	Angelica Roos (SWE)	106 kg	Maria Luana Grigoriu (ROU)	104 kg
– 58 kg	Total	Rebeka Koha (LAT)	220 kg	Angelica Roos (SWE)	191 kg	Andreea Penciu (ROU)	190 kg
– 63 kg	Snatch	Loredana Toma (ROU)	105 kg	Irina Lepșa (ROU)	97 kg	Irene Martínez (ESP)	94 kg
– 63 kg	Clean & Jerk	Loredana Toma (ROU)	131 kg	Irina Lepșa (ROU)	122 kg	Anni Vuohijoki (FIN)	112 kg
– 63 kg	Total	Loredana Toma (ROU)	236 kg	Irina Lepșa (ROU)	219 kg	Anni Vuohijoki (FIN)	203 kg
– 69 kg	Snatch	Giorgia Bordignon (ITA)	102 kg	Patricia Strenius (SWE)	99 kg	Patrycja Piechowiak (POL)	98 kg
– 69 kg	Clean & Jerk	Patricia Strenius (SWE)	131 kg	Giorgia Bordignon (ITA)	122 kg	Tatia Lortkipanidze (GEO)	121 kg
– 69 kg	Total	Patricia Strenius (SWE)	230 kg	Giorgia Bordignon (ITA)	224 kg	Patrycja Piechowiak (POL)	215 kg
– 75 kg	Snatch	Lydia Valentín (ESP)	115 kg	Gaëlle Nayo-Ketchanke (FRA)	103 kg	Małgorzata Wiejak (POL)	101 kg
– 75 kg	Clean & Jerk	Lydia Valentín (ESP)	135 kg	Gaëlle Nayo-Ketchanke (FRA)	131 kg	Meri Ilmarinen (FIN)	123 kg
– 75 kg	Total	Lydia Valentín (ESP)	250 kg	Gaëlle Nayo-Ketchanke (FRA)	234 kg	Meri Ilmarinen (FIN)	223 kg
– 90 kg	Snatch	Anastasiia Hotfrid (GEO)	124 kg	Anna Van Bellinghen (BEL)	102 kg	Sarah Fischer (AUT)	101 kg
– 90 kg	Clean & Jerk	Anastasiia Hotfrid (GEO)	132 kg	Kinga Kaczmarczyk (POL)	129 kg	Sarah Fischer (AUT)	125 kg
– 90 kg	Total	Anastasiia Hotfrid (GEO)	256 kg	Sarah Fischer (AUT)	226 kg	Kinga Kaczmarczyk (POL)	225 kg
+ 90 kg	Snatch	Krisztina Magát (HUN)	104 kg	Aleksandra Mierzejewska (POL)	103 kg	Andreea Aanei (ROU)	102 kg
+ 90 kg	Clean & Jerk	Aleksandra Mierzejewska (POL)	134 kg	Krisztina Magát (HUN)	132 kg	Andreea Aanei (ROU)	120 kg
+ 90 kg	Total	Aleksandra Mierzejewska (POL)	237 kg	Krisztina Magát (HUN)	236 kg	Andreea Aanei (ROU)	222 kg

== Men's results ==
=== Men's 56 kg ===
Rank	Athlete	Group	Body weight	Snatch (kg)				Clean & Jerk (kg)				Total
Rank	Athlete	Group	Body weight	1	2	3	Rank	1	2	3	Rank	Total
1st place, gold medalist(s)	Josué Brachi (ESP)	A	55.98	116	~~119~~	~~119~~	1st place, gold medalist(s)	138	~~141~~	~~141~~	2nd place, silver medalist(s)	254
2nd place, silver medalist(s)	Mirco Scarantino (ITA)	A	56.00	111	~~115~~	115	2nd place, silver medalist(s)	138	~~141~~	~~141~~	1st place, gold medalist(s)	253
3rd place, bronze medalist(s)	Ilie Ciotoiu (ROU)	A	55.94	110	~~114~~	~~114~~	4	137	~~141~~	~~145~~	3rd place, bronze medalist(s)	247
4	Goderdzi Berdelidze (GEO)	A	55.92	~~112~~	112	~~118~~	3rd place, bronze medalist(s)	~~134~~	134	~~140~~	4	246
5	Angel Rusev (BUL)	A	55.98	100	103	105	6	~~125~~	125	128	5	233
6	Cristian Marian Luca (ROU)	A	55.60	100	104	107	5	120	~~124~~	125	7	232
7	František Polák (CZE)	A	55.98	~~98~~	98	103	7	117	122	125	6	228
	Georgije Bogojević (CRO)	B	55.42	65	70	~~73~~	8	~~90~~	~~90~~	~~90~~	—	—

=== Men's 62 kg ===
Rank	Athlete	Group	Body weight	Snatch (kg)				Clean & Jerk (kg)				Total
Rank	Athlete	Group	Body weight	1	2	3	Rank	1	2	3	Rank	Total
1st place, gold medalist(s)	Shota Mishvelidze (GEO)	A	62.00	129	~~133~~	134	2nd place, silver medalist(s)	152	158	165	1st place, gold medalist(s)	299
2nd place, silver medalist(s)	Stilyan Grozdev (BUL)	A	61.75	129	132	135	1st place, gold medalist(s)	152	158	~~165~~	2nd place, silver medalist(s)	293
3rd place, bronze medalist(s)	Ionuț Ilie (ROU)	A	61.90	123	126	129	4	145	152	154	3rd place, bronze medalist(s)	283
4	Vladimir Urumov (BUL)	A	62.00	~~125~~	127	130	3rd place, bronze medalist(s)	~~150~~	~~150~~	152	4	282
5	Ramini Shamilishvili (GEO)	A	61.90	120	125	128	5	145	150	~~156~~	5	278
6	Robert Stefan Manea (ROU)	A	61.75	105	111	~~116~~	7	135	140	~~145~~	6	251
7	Iewi Bar (ISR)	A	61.35	~~112~~	112	~~115~~	6	~~132~~	~~132~~	132	7	244
	Romario Avdiraj (ALB)	A	61.65	110	~~115~~	~~115~~	8	—	—	—	—	—

=== Men's 69 kg ===
Rank	Athlete	Group	Body weight	Snatch (kg)				Clean & Jerk (kg)				Total
Rank	Athlete	Group	Body weight	1	2	3	Rank	1	2	3	Rank	Total
1st place, gold medalist(s)	Briken Calja (ALB)	A	68.95	141	143	146	1st place, gold medalist(s)	171	~~175~~	175	1st place, gold medalist(s)	321
2nd place, silver medalist(s)	Robert Joachim (GER)	A	68.95	133	136	138	4	167	170	173	3rd place, bronze medalist(s)	311
3rd place, bronze medalist(s)	David Sánchez (ESP)	A	68.90	137	139	141	3rd place, bronze medalist(s)	~~168~~	168	~~172~~	5	309
4	Goga Chkheidze (GEO)	A	68.70	130	134	137	5	165	172	~~175~~	4	309
5	Mirko Zanni (ITA)	A	68.55	140	143	~~146~~	2nd place, silver medalist(s)	165	~~169~~	~~169~~	6	308
6	Paul Dumitraşcu (ROU)	A	68.95	128	131	~~134~~	9	167	171	174	2nd place, silver medalist(s)	305
7	Petr Petrov (CZE)	A	68.65	133	~~137~~	137	6	165	~~169~~	~~169~~	7	302
8	Çerçiz Arbëri (ALB)	A	68.60	135	~~141~~	~~142~~	7	156	~~161~~	—	12	291
9	Dian Minchev (BUL)	A	69.00	128	131	~~134~~	8	160	~~163~~	~~165~~	10	291
10	Constantin Carp (ROU)	B	68.35	124	130	~~135~~	10	150	155	160	9	290
11	Damian Wiśniewski (POL)	B	68.40	~~125~~	125	~~128~~	11	155	161	~~166~~	8	286
12	Piotr Poniedziałek (POL)	B	69.00	~~125~~	~~125~~	125	12	~~156~~	156	~~162~~	11	281
13	Mathias Ström (DEN)	B	68.95	110	~~115~~	~~115~~	13	130	135	~~141~~	13	245

=== Men's 77 kg ===
Rank	Athlete	Group	Body weight	Snatch (kg)				Clean & Jerk (kg)				Total
Rank	Athlete	Group	Body weight	1	2	3	Rank	1	2	3	Rank	Total
1st place, gold medalist(s)	Nico Müller (GER)	A	76.80	145	150	155	4	183	187	191	1st place, gold medalist(s)	346
2nd place, silver medalist(s)	Răzvan Martin (ROU)	A	76.90	155	~~158~~	158	1st place, gold medalist(s)	185	~~188~~	~~190~~	2nd place, silver medalist(s)	343
3rd place, bronze medalist(s)	Andrés Mata (ESP)	A	76.85	150	155	157	2nd place, silver medalist(s)	~~185~~	185	~~191~~	3rd place, bronze medalist(s)	342
4	Ritvars Suharevs (LAT)	A	76.45	~~150~~	150	156	3rd place, bronze medalist(s)	176	181	~~186~~	5	337
5	Daniel Bajer (POL)	A	76.45	148	151	154	5	180	~~185~~	~~185~~	6	334
6	Yunder Beytula (BUL)	A	76.90	143	146	146	7	179	183	~~190~~	4	326
7	Alejandro González (ESP)	A	76.45	~~145~~	~~145~~	145	6	175	180	~~189~~	7	325
8	Tim Kring (DEN)	A	76.60	137	141	~~145~~	8	168	~~172~~	~~172~~	8	309
9	Omed Alam (DEN)	B	76.70	128	131	134	9	159	163	166	9	300
10	Chris Murray (GBR)	B	75.95	122	126	130	11	151	156	~~161~~	11	286
11	Sami Köngäs (FIN)	B	77.00	123	126	~~128~~	12	153	156	~~161~~	12	282
12	Jason Epton (GBR)	B	77.00	~~120~~	120	~~123~~	14	150	~~154~~	157	10	277
13	Einar Ingi Jónsson (ISL)	B	72.00	116	120	123	13	145	150	~~155~~	13	273
—	Peter Poláček (SVK)	B	76.55	128	131	~~134~~	10	~~158~~	~~159~~	~~159~~	—	—
—	Daniel Godelli (ALB)	A	76.60	~~159~~	~~159~~	~~159~~	—	—	—	—	—	—

=== Men's 85 kg ===
Rank	Athlete	Group	Body weight	Snatch (kg)				Clean & Jerk (kg)				Total
Rank	Athlete	Group	Body weight	1	2	3	Rank	1	2	3	Rank	Total
1st place, gold medalist(s)	Revaz Davitadze (GEO)	A	84.80	156	160	163	1st place, gold medalist(s)	183	187	190	2nd place, silver medalist(s)	353
2nd place, silver medalist(s)	Kacper Kłos (POL)	A	84.65	148	151	153	2nd place, silver medalist(s)	186	189	~~191~~	3rd place, bronze medalist(s)	342
3rd place, bronze medalist(s)	Brandon Vautard (FRA)	A	84.80	~~144~~	~~144~~	144	10	188	~~190~~	191	1st place, gold medalist(s)	335
4	Karol Samko (SVK)	A	84.85	140	145	~~150~~	9	187	189	~~191~~	4	334
5	Tom Schwarzbach (GER)	A	84.90	~~148~~	148	~~151~~	7	185	~~189~~	~~190~~	5	333
6	Krzysztof Zwarycz (POL)	A	84.95	150	~~153~~	~~153~~	5	182	~~187~~	~~190~~	6	332
7	Krenar Shoraj (ALB)	B	84.10	~~150~~	150	~~155~~	4	181	~~195~~	~~195~~	7	331
8	Richard Tkac (SVK)	A	84.70	143	147	~~150~~	8	174	~~180~~	180	8	327
9	Irmantas Kačinskas (LTU)	A	84.20	145	150	~~153~~	6	170	176	~~182~~	9	326
10	Alberto Fernández (ESP)	B	83.75	145	150	~~155~~	3rd place, bronze medalist(s)	170	175	~~180~~	10	325
11	Roger Myrholt (NOR)	C	83.10	132	136	~~140~~	11	170	~~176~~	~~180~~	11	306
12	Ensar Musić (CRO)	B	84.95	~~130~~	~~130~~	130	13	~~170~~	170	~~175~~	12	300
13	Tobias Knudsen (DEN)	B	84.90	126	~~131~~	133	12	156	161	~~167~~	13	294
14	Cathal Byrd (IRL)	B	84.50	115	~~118~~	118	14	150	155	157	14	275
15	Arbnor Krasniqi (KOS)	C	82.50	102	106	~~111~~	15	133	137	~~141~~	15	243
	Amar Musić (CRO)	A	85.00	~~150~~	~~150~~	~~151~~	—	—	—	—	—	—

=== Men's 94 kg ===
Rank	Athlete	Group	Body weight	Snatch (kg)				Clean & Jerk (kg)				Total
Rank	Athlete	Group	Body weight	1	2	3	Rank	1	2	3	Rank	Total
1st place, gold medalist(s)	Nicolae Onică (ROU)	A	93.75	165	~~171~~	171	1st place, gold medalist(s)	204	~~210~~	210	1st place, gold medalist(s)	381
2nd place, silver medalist(s)	Łukasz Grela (POL)	A	94.00	161	165	169	2nd place, silver medalist(s)	188	~~192~~	~~192~~	6	357
3rd place, bronze medalist(s)	Vadims Koževņikovs (LAT)	A	93.50	~~153~~	~~154~~	154	5	193	198	~~204~~	2nd place, silver medalist(s)	352
4	Artur Mugurdumov (ISR)	A	93.75	155	158	161	3rd place, bronze medalist(s)	~~186~~	186	~~197~~	8	347
5	Manuel Sánchez (ESP)	A	93.85	153	~~157~~	157	4	190	~~195~~	~~195~~	4	347
6	Eero Retulainen (FIN)	A	93.55	147	151	153	6	185	189	192	3rd place, bronze medalist(s)	345
7	Theodoros Iakovidis (GRE)	B	90.30	~~151~~	151	~~156~~	7	180	187	~~194~~	7	338
8	Tomas Li-čin-chai (LTU)	B	93.85	143	148	~~152~~	8	175	~~184~~	~~184~~	10	323
9	Simon Darville (DEN)	B	94.00	130	136	140	10	164	~~170~~	176	9	316
10	Maciej Makinia (DEN)	B	93.80	135	~~140~~	140	11	165	~~170~~	170	11	310
11	Matteo Urbinati (SMR)	B	90.20	110	115	~~120~~	13	140	147	~~150~~	13	262
12	Petar Bertagnin (CRO)	B	86.70	110	116	120	12	130	141	~~145~~	14	261
	Paweł Kulik (POL)	A	92.20	~~155~~	~~155~~	~~155~~	—	190	~~195~~	~~199~~	5	—
	Tschan Yannick (SUI)	B	93.00	~~135~~	~~135~~	~~135~~	—	160	~~165~~	~~167~~	12	—
	Tomáš Kejík (CZE)	B	93.00	140	~~145~~	~~145~~	9	—	—	—	—	—
DQ	Žygimantas Stanulis (LTU)	A	93.90	165	170	172	—	192	201	202	—	—

=== Men's 105 kg ===
Rank	Athlete	Group	Body weight	Snatch (kg)				Clean & Jerk (kg)				Total
Rank	Athlete	Group	Body weight	1	2	3	Rank	1	2	3	Rank	Total
1st place, gold medalist(s)	Arkadiusz Michalski (POL)	A	104.95	171	~~174~~	175	3rd place, bronze medalist(s)	211	214	221	1st place, gold medalist(s)	396
2nd place, silver medalist(s)	Georgi Shikov (BUL)	A	103.50	172	176	~~179~~	2nd place, silver medalist(s)	203	209	212	2nd place, silver medalist(s)	388
3rd place, bronze medalist(s)	Sargis Martirosjan (AUT)	A	104.70	176	182	~~184~~	1st place, gold medalist(s)	202	~~206~~	~~208~~	4	384
4	Dato Khetsuriani (GEO)	A	104.50	165	171	174	4	195	~~204~~	~~207~~	5	369
5	Matthäus Hofmann (GER)	A	104.55	166	~~171~~	172	5	192	~~198~~	~~200~~	6	364
6	Arnas Šidiškis (LTU)	B	104.55	158	163	166	6	190	~~195~~	~~200~~	7	356
7	Sergej Lichovoj (LTU)	B	104.95	157	162	166	7	188	~~193~~	~~195~~	10	354
8	Philipp Forster (AUT)	A	104.60	155	160	~~162~~	8	190	~~197~~	~~197~~	9	350
9	Jiří Gasior (CZE)	B	104.25	~~150~~	150	154	10	190	~~195~~	~~195~~	8	340
10	Stefan Ågren (SWE)	A	105.00	151	155	~~158~~	9	~~185~~	~~185~~	185	11	340
11	Jani Heikkinen (FIN)	B	104.60	140	144	147	13	175	180	~~184~~	13	327
12	Roni Peltonen (FIN)	B	103.40	145	150	~~153~~	12	175	~~180~~	~~180~~	14	325
13	Mikkel Andersen (DEN)	B	103.90	145	~~150~~	~~152~~	14	175	180	~~183~~	12	325
14	Ivan Perasović (CRO)	B	95.15	120	125	~~131~~	15	140	~~150~~	~~150~~	15	265
	Matej Kováč (SVK)	A	104.70	~~167~~	~~170~~	~~170~~	—	201	206	~~212~~	3rd place, bronze medalist(s)	—
	Nenad Kužić (SRB)	A	104.25	~~161~~	~~161~~	~~161~~	—	—	—	—	—	—

=== Men's +105 kg ===
Rank	Athlete	Group	Body weight	Snatch (kg)				Clean & Jerk (kg)				Total
Rank	Athlete	Group	Body weight	1	2	3	Rank	1	2	3	Rank	Total
1st place, gold medalist(s)	Lasha Talakhadze (GEO)	A	165.56	200	210	~~221~~	1st place, gold medalist(s)	235	247	—	1st place, gold medalist(s)	457
2nd place, silver medalist(s)	Jiří Orság (CZE)	A	131.44	175	181	~~186~~	5	227	236	~~246~~	2nd place, silver medalist(s)	417
3rd place, bronze medalist(s)	Péter Nagy (HUN)	A	157.43	182	187	191	3rd place, bronze medalist(s)	215	221	225	4	416
4	Irakli Turmanidze (GEO)	A	135.49	185	190	192	2nd place, silver medalist(s)	217	~~223~~	223	5	415
5	Kamil Kučera (CZE)	A	141.23	175	181	~~185~~	4	216	221	226	3rd place, bronze medalist(s)	407
6	Tamaš Kajdoči (SRB)	A	136.55	~~165~~	165	170	8	205	210	~~216~~	6	380
7	David Litvinov (ISR)	A	119.01	~~165~~	165	170	7	~~195~~	195	198	10	368
8	Radoslav Tatarčík (SVK)	A	111.20	168	173	176	6	182	187	191	12	367
9	Kim Eirik Tollefsen (NOR)	B	116.82	155	158	160	11	195	200	203	7	363
10	Igor Olshanetskyi (ISR)	A	127.34	157	162	~~165~~	10	195	~~201~~	~~202~~	11	357
11	Tivadar Kajdocsi (SRB)	B	130.75	150	155	~~160~~	12	195	200	~~209~~	9	355
12	Teemu Roininen (FIN)	B	141.45	152	~~156~~	~~156~~	13	197	~~201~~	201	8	353
13	Deivydas Jucius (LTU)	B	134.50	150	~~155~~	~~158~~	14	185	190	~~195~~	13	340
14	Sean Rigsby (IRL)	B	124.50	130	135	~~140~~	16	180	187	~~191~~	14	322
15	Phillip Heiberg (DEN)	B	172.60	140	146	~~150~~	15	~~175~~	175	~~186~~	15	321
	Ante Vuković (CRO)	A	133.32	~~165~~	~~165~~	165	9	~~195~~	~~195~~	~~195~~	—	—

== Women's results ==
=== Women's 48 kg ===
Rank	Athlete	Group	Body weight	Snatch (kg)				Clean & Jerk (kg)				Total
Rank	Athlete	Group	Body weight	1	2	3	Rank	1	2	3	Rank	Total
1st place, gold medalist(s)	Elena Andrieș (ROU)	A	47.86	75	79	~~80~~	1st place, gold medalist(s)	94	98	100	1st place, gold medalist(s)	179
2nd place, silver medalist(s)	Anaïs Michel (FRA)	A	47.98	~~78~~	78	~~80~~	2nd place, silver medalist(s)	96	~~100~~	~~102~~	2nd place, silver medalist(s)	174
3rd place, bronze medalist(s)	Daniela Pandova (BUL)	A	48.00	69	71	~~74~~	5	85	~~93~~	94	3rd place, bronze medalist(s)	165
4	Genny Pagliaro (ITA)	A	47.96	70	73	~~75~~	4	~~88~~	90	~~94~~	4	163
5	Alessandra Pagliaro (ITA)	A	46.40	70	~~73~~	74	3rd place, bronze medalist(s)	84	87	~~90~~	5	161
6	Agnieszka Zacharek (POL)	A	47.98	65	68	~~70~~	7	~~85~~	85	~~89~~	6	153
7	Surya Sundqvist (SWE)	B	47.70	66	69	71	6	78	81	~~84~~	8	152
8	Maria Pipiliaridou (GRE)	B	47.88	~~65~~	65	~~68~~	9	~~84~~	84	~~87~~	7	149
9	Noorin Gulam (GBR)	A	47.94	65	~~68~~	~~68~~	8	~~80~~	80	~~83~~	9	145
10	Tihana Majer (CRO)	B	46.50	~~55~~	55	64	10	70	75	~~80~~	10	139

=== Women's 53 kg ===
Rank	Athlete	Group	Body weight	Snatch (kg)				Clean & Jerk (kg)				Total
Rank	Athlete	Group	Body weight	1	2	3	Rank	1	2	3	Rank	Total
1st place, gold medalist(s)	Joanna Łochowska (POL)	A	52.80	85	88	~~90~~	1st place, gold medalist(s)	105	~~108~~	108	1st place, gold medalist(s)	196
2nd place, silver medalist(s)	Jennifer Lombardo (ITA)	A	52.68	80	82	84	2nd place, silver medalist(s)	102	104	107	2nd place, silver medalist(s)	191
3rd place, bronze medalist(s)	Giorgia Russo (ITA)	A	52.60	75	78	80	5	103	106	~~108~~	3rd place, bronze medalist(s)	186
4	Manon Lorentz (FRA)	A	51.22	81	83	~~85~~	3rd place, bronze medalist(s)	~~98~~	~~99~~	99	6	182
5	Atenery Hernández (ESP)	A	52.80	81	~~83~~	~~84~~	4	100	~~103~~	~~103~~	4	181
6	Sarah Øvsthus (NOR)	A	52.60	~~77~~	79	~~81~~	6	~~97~~	99	~~102~~	5	178
7	Maya Ivanova (BUL)	A	52.94	74	76	~~78~~	8	92	~~95~~	~~96~~	9	168
8	Katrine Bruhn (DEN)	A	52.98	71	~~74~~	74	11	90	94	~~96~~	7	168
9	Rebekka Tao Jacobsen (NOR)	B	52.98	72	74	~~76~~	10	93	~~96~~	~~96~~	8	167
10	Aksana Zalatarova (ISR)	B	52.98	75	~~78~~	78	7	~~88~~	88	~~91~~	13	166
11	Amy Williams (GBR)	B	52.70	70	~~73~~	75	9	90	~~94~~	~~94~~	12	165
12	Nina Sterckx (BEL)	B	52.84	70	73	~~75~~	12	88	91	~~94~~	10	164
13	Isa Mursu (FIN)	A	52.66	~~70~~	~~70~~	71	13	91	~~96~~	~~96~~	11	162
14	Jessica Borgström (SWE)	B	52.86	67	~~70~~	~~71~~	14	79	~~82~~	~~82~~	14	146
15	Leonora Brajshori (KOS)	B	52.84	~~62~~	62	65	15	~~78~~	78	~~80~~	15	143
16	Jessica Preiss (SUI)	B	51.28	62	64	~~66~~	16	72	75	~~76~~	19	139

=== Women's 58 kg ===
Rank	Athlete	Group	Body weight	Snatch (kg)				Clean & Jerk (kg)				Total
Rank	Athlete	Group	Body weight	1	2	3	Rank	1	2	3	Rank	Total
1st place, gold medalist(s)	Rebeka Koha (LAT)	A	57.78	90	95	100	1st place, gold medalist(s)	110	115	120	1st place, gold medalist(s)	220
2nd place, silver medalist(s)	Angelica Roos (SWE)	A	57.68	83	85	~~86~~	3rd place, bronze medalist(s)	104	~~106~~	106	2nd place, silver medalist(s)	191
3rd place, bronze medalist(s)	Andreea Penciu (ROU)	A	57.16	83	86	88	2nd place, silver medalist(s)	98	~~191~~	102	4	190
4	Maria Luana Grigoriu (ROU)	A	57.96	~~83~~	83	~~86~~	4	100	~~104~~	104	3rd place, bronze medalist(s)	187
5	Sol Anette Waaler (NOR)	A	57.38	~~77~~	77	80	6	97	99	~~102~~	5	179
6	Jenni Puputti (FIN)	A	57.70	~~80~~	80	~~84~~	5	95	98	~~101~~	6	178
7	Olivia Blatch (GBR)	A	57.70	76	79	~~81~~	7	~~95~~	95	~~98~~	8	174
8	Laura Liukkonen (FIN)	A	57.56	78	~~81~~	~~81~~	8	~~96~~	96	~~101~~	7	174
9	Nathalie Lebbe (BEL)	B	57.74	67	70	~~72~~	10	87	90	92	10	162
10	Veronika Vršková (SVK)	B	58.00	65	68	~~69~~	12	~~90~~	90	~~95~~	11	158
11	Rachel Hayes (ISR)	B	56.86	~~67~~	67	69	11	88	~~91~~	~~91~~	12	157
12	Sandra Jensen (DEN)	B	56.40	70	~~73~~	~~73~~	9	84	~~86~~	~~88~~	13	154
13	Iuliya Butkova (ISR)	B	57.24	63	67	~~69~~	13	80	84	~~87~~	14	151
14	Hilary Riordan (IRL)	B	57.46	64	67	~~69~~	14	82	~~85~~	~~86~~	15	149
15	Marina Marković (CRO)	B	54.94	50	55	~~57~~	15	72	75	77	16	132
	Amalie Løvind Årsten (DEN)	A	56.96	~~74~~	~~74~~	~~76~~	—	93	~~98~~	~~101~~	9	—

=== Women's 63 kg ===
Rank	Athlete	Group	Body weight	Snatch (kg)				Clean & Jerk (kg)				Total
Rank	Athlete	Group	Body weight	1	2	3	Rank	1	2	3	Rank	Total
1st place, gold medalist(s)	Loredana Toma (ROU)	A	62.90	100	105	~~110~~	1st place, gold medalist(s)	121	126	131	1st place, gold medalist(s)	236
2nd place, silver medalist(s)	Irina Lepșa (ROU)	A	62.90	92	95	97	2nd place, silver medalist(s)	113	118	122	2nd place, silver medalist(s)	219
3rd place, bronze medalist(s)	Anni Vuohijoki (FIN)	A	63.00	89	91	~~93~~	4	112	~~116~~	~~117~~	3rd place, bronze medalist(s)	203
4	Irene Martínez (ESP)	A	62.50	92	~~94~~	94	3rd place, bronze medalist(s)	~~106~~	106	~~109~~	7	200
5	Galya Shatova (BUL)	A	62.80	87	~~90~~	91	5	105	108	~~110~~	6	199
6	Maria Grazia Alemanno (ITA)	A	62.15	90	~~93~~	~~93~~	6	108	~~111~~	~~111~~	5	198
7	Saara Leskinen (FIN)	A	62.70	~~86~~	~~86~~	86	9	102	~~105~~	106	8	191
8	Ine Andersson (NOR)	B	61.70	77	82	~~85~~	11	103	106	108	4	190
9	Marit Årdalsbakke (NOR)	B	62.50	85	89	~~92~~	7	98	~~102~~	~~102~~	11	187
10	Tea Šojat (CRO)	B	61.95	80	~~84~~	84	10	95	~~101~~	101	9	185
11	Bobbie Ross (GBR)	B	62.20	80	83	86	8	98	~~102~~	~~102~~	12	184
12	Marina Ohman (ISR)	B	63.00	~~82~~	82	~~85~~	12	95	~~98~~	~~98~~	16	177
13	Sarit Kalo (ISR)	B	62.65	74	77	~~80~~	13	93	97	~~101~~	15	174
14	Ivana Horna (SVK)	B	62.60	75	~~79~~	~~80~~	14	~~99~~	~~99~~	99	10	174
15	Lucia Kršková (SVK)	B	62.35	72	75	~~78~~	15	92	96	98	13	173
16	Amanda Poulsen (DEN)	B	61.30	72	75	~~78~~	16	93	97	~~100~~	14	172
17	Alessia Walchli (SUI)	B	62.55	73	~~76~~	~~76~~	17	~~85~~	85	88	17	161

=== Women's 69 kg ===
Rank	Athlete	Group	Body weight	Snatch (kg)				Clean & Jerk (kg)				Total
Rank	Athlete	Group	Body weight	1	2	3	Rank	1	2	3	Rank	Total
1st place, gold medalist(s)	Patricia Strenius (SWE)	A	68.65	96	99	~~101~~	2nd place, silver medalist(s)	122	126	131	1st place, gold medalist(s)	230
2nd place, silver medalist(s)	Giorgia Bordignon (ITA)	A	65.15	97	100	102	1st place, gold medalist(s)	122	~~126~~	~~126~~	2nd place, silver medalist(s)	224
3rd place, bronze medalist(s)	Patrycja Piechowiak (POL)	A	69.00	93	96	98	3rd place, bronze medalist(s)	~~112~~	112	117	4	215
4	Tatia Lortkipanidze (GEO)	B	68.40	85	90	93	4	113	118	121	3rd place, bronze medalist(s)	214
5	Bianca Mihaela Ionita (ROU)	A	64.65	87	91	~~94~~	5	106	112	~~118~~	5	203
6	Nora Jäggi (SUI)	B	68.85	80	83	86	7	105	109	~~112~~	6	195
7	Simona Hertlová (CZE)	A	67.75	85	88	91	6	102	~~105~~	~~105~~	8	193
8	Marianne Saarhelo (FIN)	A	63.65	83	~~87~~	~~87~~	9	99	103	~~107~~	7	186
9	Victoria Hahn (AUT)	B	68.85	~~83~~	85	~~88~~	8	100	~~103~~	~~103~~	10	185
10	Eliška Pudivítrová (CZE)	B	66.65	~~80~~	~~80~~	80	11	~~95~~	95	98	11	178
11	Mette Pedersen (DEN)	B	68.50	79	82	~~85~~	10	91	95	~~98~~	12	177
12	Ivana Rumenović (CRO)	B	68.25	68	72	~~75~~	12	85	89	~~92~~	13	161
	Aníta Líf Aradóttir (ISL)	C	66.65	~~73~~	~~73~~	~~73~~	—	90	95	100	9	—
	Florina Sorina Hulpan (ROU)	A	63.50	~~95~~	~~95~~	—	—	—	—	—	—	—

=== Women's 75 kg ===
Rank	Athlete	Group	Body weight	Snatch (kg)				Clean & Jerk (kg)				Total
Rank	Athlete	Group	Body weight	1	2	3	Rank	1	2	3	Rank	Total
1st place, gold medalist(s)	Lydia Valentín (ESP)	A	74.40	107	112	115	1st place, gold medalist(s)	130	135	~~140~~	1st place, gold medalist(s)	250
2nd place, silver medalist(s)	Gaëlle Nayo-Ketchanke (FRA)	A	74.90	98	101	103	2nd place, silver medalist(s)	126	131	~~136~~	2nd place, silver medalist(s)	234
3rd place, bronze medalist(s)	Meri Ilmarinen (FIN)	A	74.95	99	100	~~102~~	4	120	123	~~127~~	3rd place, bronze medalist(s)	223
4	Małgorzata Wiejak (POL)	A	74.95	98	101	~~103~~	3rd place, bronze medalist(s)	118	121	~~123~~	4	222
5	Maria Åkerlund (SWE)	A	70.65	93	96	98	5	113	116	~~119~~	5	214
6	Nicole Rubanovich (ISR)	A	70.65	93	96	~~98~~	6	103	~~108~~	108	6	204
7	Hermana Dermiček (CRO)	B	69.20	55	59	60	7	65	71	~~72~~	7	131

=== Women's 90 kg ===
Rank	Athlete	Group	Body weight	Snatch (kg)				Clean & Jerk (kg)				Total
Rank	Athlete	Group	Body weight	1	2	3	Rank	1	2	3	Rank	Total
1st place, gold medalist(s)	Anastasiia Hotfrid (GEO)	A	89.65	115	124	~~131~~	1st place, gold medalist(s)	~~132~~	132	—	1st place, gold medalist(s)	256
2nd place, silver medalist(s)	Sarah Fischer (AUT)	A	86.15	97	~~100~~	101	3rd place, bronze medalist(s)	122	125	~~127~~	3rd place, bronze medalist(s)	226
3rd place, bronze medalist(s)	Kinga Kaczmarczyk (POL)	A	85.10	93	96	~~98~~	4	123	129	~~131~~	2nd place, silver medalist(s)	225
4	Anna Van Bellinghen (BEL)	A	83.00	97	100	102	2nd place, silver medalist(s)	117	122	~~125~~	4	224
5	Bianka Bazsó (HUN)	A	84.20	85	89	~~92~~	7	110	111	~~115~~	6	200
6	Nikola Seničová (SVK)	B	78.40	82	87	~~92~~	8	103	109	112	5	199
7	Tímea Szuromi (HUN)	B	78.90	90	~~92~~	~~92~~	5	108	~~111~~	~~111~~	7	198
8	Rumyana Stancheva (BUL)	A	76.10	88	90	~~92~~	6	~~107~~	107	~~110~~	8	197
9	Mona Krylov (ISR)	B	80.55	75	78	80	10	93	96	~~99~~	9	176
10	Michaela Skleničková (CZE)	B	83.50	70	74	77	11	90	94	~~100~~	10	171
11	Julie Švecová (CZE)	B	75.05	75	78	81	9	87	~~91~~	~~93~~	11	168

=== Women's +90 kg ===
Rank	Athlete	Group	Body weight	Snatch (kg)				Clean & Jerk (kg)				Total
Rank	Athlete	Group	Body weight	1	2	3	Rank	1	2	3	Rank	Total
1st place, gold medalist(s)	Aleksandra Mierzejewska (POL)	A	142.45	95	100	103	2nd place, silver medalist(s)	127	132	134	1st place, gold medalist(s)	237
2nd place, silver medalist(s)	Krisztina Magát (HUN)	A	110.45	96	101	104	1st place, gold medalist(s)	126	130	132	2nd place, silver medalist(s)	236
3rd place, bronze medalist(s)	Andreea Aanei (ROU)	A	113.25	~~101~~	102	~~104~~	3rd place, bronze medalist(s)	120	~~129~~	—	3rd place, bronze medalist(s)	222
4	Eleni Konstantinidi (GRE)	A	91.65	84	87	~~90~~	6	106	110	115	4	202
5	Petya Stoimenova (BUL)	A	109.25	86	89	92	4	105	109	~~112~~	5	201
6	Louise Vennekilde (DEN)	A	94.90	83	88	91	5	104	109	~~112~~	6	200
7	Barbara Gyürűs (HUN)	B	128.75	80	83	86	7	100	104	~~108~~	7	190
8	Tereza Králová (CZE)	B	93.40	72	~~76~~	77	8	85	90	~~93~~	8	167
9	Ana Crnjac (CRO)	B	97.40	50	60	~~63~~	9	65	~~70~~	70	9	130

== Participating nations ==
A total of 208 competitors from 30 nations participated.

- Albania (5)
- Austria (4)
- Belgium (3)
- Bulgaria (11)
- Croatia (12)
- Czech Republic (11)
- Denmark (14)
- Finland (12)
- France (4)
- Georgia (10)
- Germany (4)
- Great Britain (6)
- Greece (3)
- Hungary (5)
- Iceland (2)
- Ireland (3)
- Israel (11)
- Italy (8)
- Kosovo (2)
- Latvia (3)
- Lithuania (6)
- Norway (7)
- Poland (14)
- Romania (16)
- San Marino (1)
- Serbia (3)
- Slovakia (9)
- Spain (9)
- Sweden (6)
- Switzerland (4)
