= Loredana Toma =

Romanian weightlifter (born 1995)

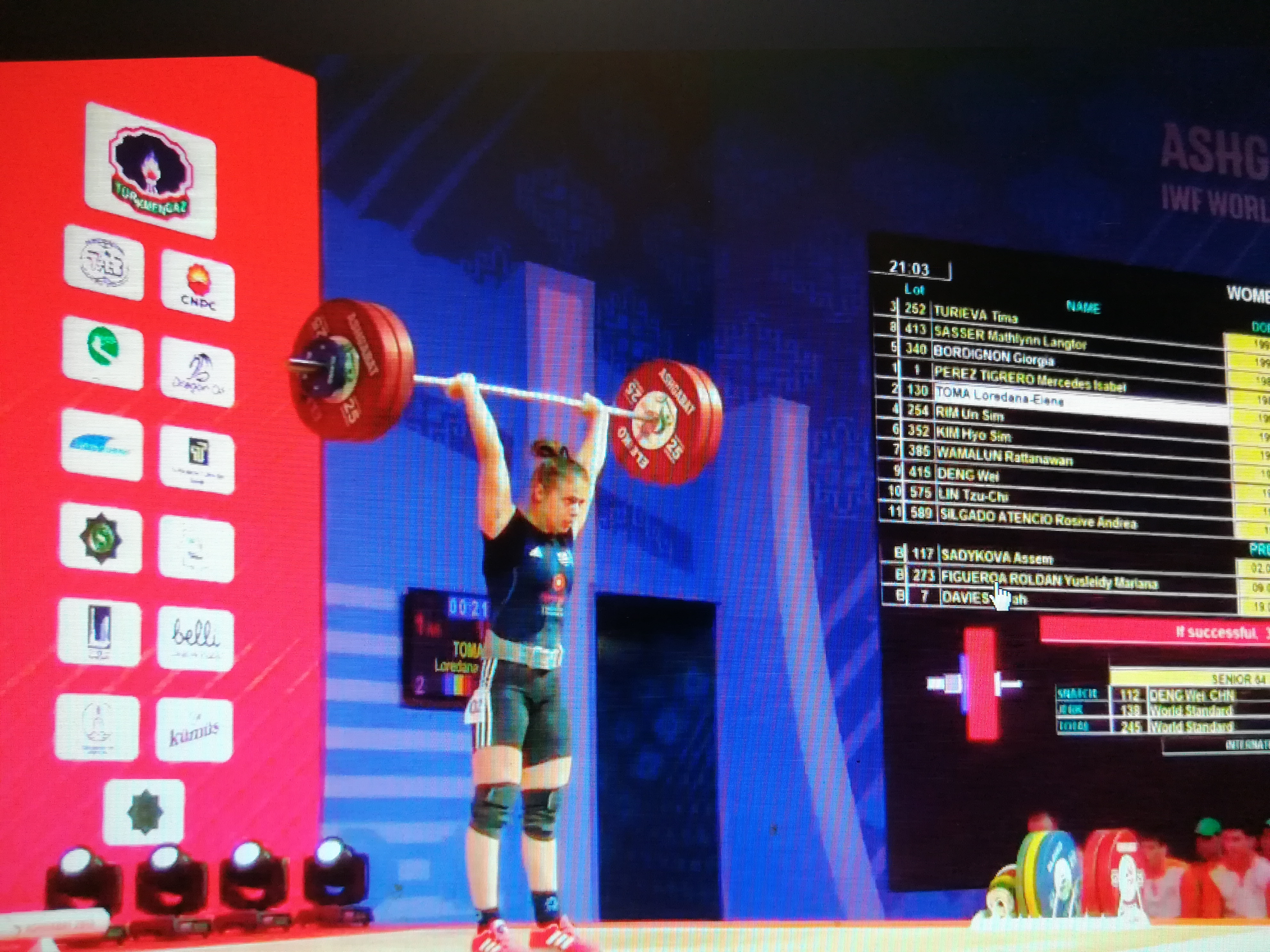
- Toma in 2018

Personal information
- Full name: Loredana Elena Toma
- Nickname: Tomanator
- Nationality: Romanian
- Born: 10 May 1995 (age 31) Botoșani, Romania
- Height: 165 cm (5 ft 5 in)
- Weight: 63.95 kg (141 lb)

Sport
- Country: Romania
- Sport: Weightlifting
- Event: –71 kg
- Club: CS Rapid Bucuresti
- Coached by: Constantin Urdaș

Achievements and titles
- Personal bests: Snatch: 119 kg (2022, CWR); Clean and jerk: 137 kg (2022); Total: 256 kg (2022)
Medal record
Representing Romania
World Championships
Gold medal – first place	2017 Anaheim	–63 kg
Gold medal – first place	2022 Bogotá	–71 kg
Bronze medal – third place	2018 Ashgabat	–64 kg
Bronze medal – third place	2019 Pattaya	–64 kg
European Championships
Gold medal – first place	2017 Split	–63 kg
Gold medal – first place	2018 Bucharest	–63 kg
Gold medal – first place	2019 Batumi	–64 kg
Gold medal – first place	2021 Moscow	–64 kg
Gold medal – first place	2023 Yerevan	–71 kg
Gold medal – first place	2024 Sofia	–71 kg
Silver medal – second place	2013 Tirana	–58 kg
Silver medal – second place	2014 Tel Aviv	–58 kg
European Junior Championships
Gold medal – first place	2011 Bucharest	–58 kg
Gold medal – first place	2012 Eilat	–58 kg
Youth World Championships
Silver medal – second place	2012 Košice	–63 kg
European Youth Championships
Gold medal – first place	2012 Bucharest	–63 kg

Loredana Elena Toma (born 10 May 1995) is a Romanian weightlifter, two time World Champion and six time European Champion competing in the 58 kg and 63 kg categories until 2018 and 64 kg starting in 2018 after the International Weightlifting Federation reorganized the categories. She now competes at the 71 kg category.

== Career ==
=== Olympic Games ===
In August 2024, Toma competed in the women's 71 kg event at the 2024 Summer Olympics held in Paris, France. She lifted 115 kg in the Snatch placing third but she failed three attempts in the Clean & Jerk.

=== World Championships ===
After winning the 2017 European Weightlifting Championships she competed at the 2017 World Weightlifting Championships in the 63 kg division. She won gold medals in the snatch, clean & jerk and total, finishing with a total of 237 kg, a full 12 kg over the silver medalist Lina Rivas. She won the 2022 World Weightlifting Championships in the 71 kg division, snatching a new world record of 119 kg and clean and jerking 137 kg for a total of 256 kg.

=== European Championships ===
After winning two silver medals in the 58 kg categories at the 2013 and 2014 European Weightlifting Championships she moved up weight classes to the 63 kg in 2017. At the 2017 European Weightlifting Championships she won gold medals in all lifts to win her first European Championship.

In 2018, fresh off of a World Championships gold medal, she competed at the 2018 European Weightlifting Championships in her home country of Romania. She again won gold medals in all lifts, with her final total of 236 kg being 17 kg over the silver medalist Irina Lepșa, and 6 kg over the gold medallist of the next highest (69 kg) category.

== Doping case ==
In 2014 she tested positive for Stanozolol and was banned for two years by the International Weightlifting Federation.

== Major results ==
Year	Venue	Weight	Snatch (kg)				Clean & Jerk (kg)				Total	Rank
Year	Venue	Weight	1	2	3	Rank	1	2	3	Rank	Total	Rank
Summer Olympics
2024	Paris, France	71 kg	111	115	~~117~~	—N/a	~~131~~	~~133~~	~~134~~	—N/a	DNF	—
World Championships
2013	Wrocław, Poland	58 kg	91	95	~~98~~	6	111	116	118	5	213	4
2017	Anaheim, United States	63 kg	103	106	109	1st place, gold medalist(s)	123	126	128	1st place, gold medalist(s)	237	1st place, gold medalist(s)
2018	Ashgabat, Turkmenistan	64 kg	106	110	~~112~~	2nd place, silver medalist(s)	124	~~128~~	~~129~~	7	234	3rd place, bronze medalist(s)
2019	Pattaya, Thailand	64 kg	107	112	~~116~~	3rd place, bronze medalist(s)	~~127~~	~~127~~	128	4	240	3rd place, bronze medalist(s)
2022	Bogotá, Colombia	71 kg	113	117	119 WR	1st place, gold medalist(s)	133	137	~~140~~	4	256	1st place, gold medalist(s)
IWF World Cup
2020	Rome, Italy	64 kg	100	105	113	1st place, gold medalist(s)	122	130	136	1st place, gold medalist(s)	249	1st place, gold medalist(s)
2024	Phuket, Thailand	71 kg	105	~~110~~	~~110~~	14	125	130	~~134~~	14	235	12
European Championships
2012	Antalya, Turkey	63 kg	77	82	85	6	97	102	~~105~~	9	187	7
2013	Tirana, Albania	58 kg	89	93	~~96~~	3rd place, bronze medalist(s)	108	113	117	2nd place, silver medalist(s)	210	2nd place, silver medalist(s)
2014	Tel Aviv, Israel	58 kg	90	93	96	2nd place, silver medalist(s)	111	115	~~119~~	2nd place, silver medalist(s)	211	2nd place, silver medalist(s)
2017	Split, Croatia	63 kg	100	~~104~~	~~104~~	1st place, gold medalist(s)	121	126	~~130~~	1st place, gold medalist(s)	226	1st place, gold medalist(s)
2018	Bucharest, Romania	63 kg	100	105	~~110~~	1st place, gold medalist(s)	121	126	131	1st place, gold medalist(s)	236	1st place, gold medalist(s)
2019	Batumi, Georgia	64 kg	106	111	~~114~~	1st place, gold medalist(s)	125	128	~~132~~	1st place, gold medalist(s)	239	1st place, gold medalist(s)
2021	Moscow, Russia	64 kg	101	107	114	1st place, gold medalist(s)	123	130	~~137~~	1st place, gold medalist(s)	244	1st place, gold medalist(s)
2023	Yerevan, Armenia	71 kg	105	110	~~115~~	1st place, gold medalist(s)	125	~~130~~	130	1st place, gold medalist(s)	240	1st place, gold medalist(s)
2024	Sofia, Bulgaria	71 kg	106	109	114	1st place, gold medalist(s)	127	~~131~~	~~131~~	4	241	1st place, gold medalist(s)
