= Florin Croitoru =

Romanian weightlifter (born 1993)

Personal information
- Full name: Florin Ionuț Croitoru
- Born: 25 August 1993 (age 32)
- Height: 1.60 m (5 ft 3 in)
- Weight: 56 kg (123 lb)

Sport
- Country: Romania
- Sport: Weightlifting
- Club: CS Rapid București
- Coached by: Pavel Rugea
Medal record
European Championships
Gold medal – first place	2013 Tirana	– 62 kg
Gold medal – first place	2014 Tel Aviv	– 56 kg
Bronze medal – third place	2015 Tbilisi	– 62 kg
European Junior Championships
Gold medal – first place	2011 Bucharest	– 56 kg
Gold medal – first place	2012 Eilat	– 62 kg
Gold medal – first place	2013 Tallinn	– 62 kg
Silver medal – second place	2010 Limassol	– 50 kg
European Youth Championships
Gold medal – first place	2010 Valencia	– 50 kg

Florin Ionuț Croitoru (born 25 August 1993) is a Romanian weightlifter who competed at the 2012 Summer Olympics in the Men's 56 kg. He finished fourth place at the 2013 European Championships, but later he won gold, after all three medalists (Valentin Hristov, Igor Bour, Zulfugar Suleymanov) were suspended for doping.

In May 2019 he was disqualified from the 2012 Summer Olympics after the re-analysis of his samples. Croitoru tested positive for dehydrochlormethyltestosterone, metenolone and stanozolol.
