= 2014 European Weightlifting Championships =

International weightlifting competition

- Location: Tel Aviv, Israel
- Dates: 3–13 April

The 2014 European Weightlifting Championships were held in Tel Aviv, Israel from 3 to 13 April 2014.

== Medals tables ==
Ranking by Big (Total result) medals

Rank	Nation	Gold	Silver	Bronze	Total
1	Russia (RUS)	5	4	1	10
2	Bulgaria (BUL)	2	1	3	6
3	Poland (POL)	1	2	1	4
4	Belarus (BLR)	1	1	1	3
4	Romania (ROM)	1	1	1	3
6	Albania (ALB)	1	1	0	2
6	Italy (ITA)	1	1	0	2
8	Spain (ESP)	1	0	0	1
8	Turkey (TUR)	1	0	0	1
10	Armenia (ARM)	0	2	2	4
11	Ukraine (UKR)	0	1	3	4
12	France (FRA)	0	1	0	1
13	Germany (GER)	0	0	1	1
13	Great Britain (GBR)	0	0	1	1
13	Moldova (MDA)	0	0	1	1
Totals (15 entries)		14	15	15	44

Ranking by all medals: Big (Total result) and Small (Snatch and Clean & Jerk)

Rank	Nation	Gold	Silver	Bronze	Total
1	Russia (RUS)	14	11	7	32
2	Bulgaria (BUL)	6	4	6	16
3	Belarus (BLR)	4	1	3	8
4	Poland (POL)	3	6	2	11
5	Italy (ITA)	3	1	1	5
6	Spain (ESP)	3	0	0	3
7	Armenia (ARM)	2	4	3	9
7	Romania (ROM)	2	4	3	9
9	Albania (ALB)	2	3	1	6
10	Turkey (TUR)	2	2	0	4
11	Ukraine (UKR)	1	3	8	12
12	France (FRA)	0	4	1	5
13	Moldova (MDA)	0	2	3	5
14	Great Britain (GBR)	0	0	2	2
15	Belgium (BEL)	0	0	1	1
15	Estonia (EST)	0	0	1	1
15	Germany (GER)	0	0	1	1
15	Latvia (LAT)	0	0	1	1
15	Netherlands (NED)	0	0	1	1
Totals (19 entries)		42	45	45	132

== Schedule ==
All times are local (UTC+3).

Date	Time	Round
Saturday; 5 April 2014	10:00 – 12:00	Women's 48 kg Group B
Saturday; 5 April 2014	13:00 – 15:00	Men's 56 kg Group B
Saturday; 5 April 2014	16:00 – 16:30	Opening ceremony
Saturday; 5 April 2014	17:00 – 19:00	Women's 48 kg Group A
Saturday; 5 April 2014	20:00 – 22:00	Men's 56 kg Group A
Sunday; 6 April 2014	11:00 – 12:30	Women's 58 kg Group C
Sunday; 6 April 2014	13:00 – 14:30	Women's 53 kg Group B
Sunday; 6 April 2014	15:00 – 17:00	Men's 62 kg Group B
Sunday; 6 April 2014	17:00 – 19:00	Women's 53 kg Group A
Sunday; 6 April 2014	20:00 – 22:00	Men's 62 kg Group A
Monday; 7 April 2014	10:00 – 11:30	Women's 63 kg Group C
Monday; 7 April 2014	11:30 – 13:30	Women's 58 kg Group B
Monday; 7 April 2014	13:30 – 15:30	Men's 69 kg Group B
Monday; 7 April 2014	16:30 – 18:30	Women's 58 kg Group A
Monday; 7 April 2014	19:30 – 21:30	Men's 69 kg Group A
Tuesday; 8 April 2014	09:00 – 10:00	Women's 69 kg Group C
Tuesday; 8 April 2014	10:00 – 11:30	Men's 77 kg Group C
Tuesday; 8 April 2014	11:30 – 13:30	Women's 63 kg Group B
Tuesday; 8 April 2014	13:30 – 15:30	Men's 77 kg Group B
Tuesday; 8 April 2014	16:30 – 18:30	Women's 63 kg Group A
Tuesday; 8 April 2014	19:30 – 21:30	Men's 77 kg Group A

Date	Time	Round
Wednesday; 9 April 2014	10:00 – 11:30	Men's 85 kg Group C
Wednesday; 9 April 2014	11:30 – 13:30	Women's 69 kg Group B
Wednesday; 9 April 2014	13:30 – 15:30	Men's 85 kg Group B
Wednesday; 9 April 2014	16:30 – 18:30	Women's 69 kg Group A
Wednesday; 9 April 2014	19:30 – 21:30	Men's 85 kg Group A
Thursday; 10 April 2014	14:30 – 16:30	Men's 94 kg Group C
Thursday; 10 April 2014	16:30 – 18:30	Women's 75 kg Group B
Thursday; 10 April 2014	19:30 – 21:30	Women's 75 kg Group A
Friday; 11 April 2014	11:30 – 12:30	Men's 105 kg Group C
Friday; 11 April 2014	12:30 – 14:30	Women's +75 kg Group B
Friday; 11 April 2014	14:30 – 16:30	Men's 94 kg Group B
Friday; 11 April 2014	16:30 – 18:30	Men's +105 kg Group B
Friday; 11 April 2014	19:30 – 21:30	Men's 94 kg Group A
Saturday; 12 April 2014	9:30 – 11:00	Men's 105 kg Group B
Saturday; 12 April 2014	12:30 – 14:30	Men's 105 kg Group A
Saturday; 12 April 2014	15:00 – 17:00	Women's +75 kg Group A
Saturday; 12 April 2014	18:00 – 20:00	Men's +105 kg Group A
Saturday; 12 April 2014	19:30 – 21:30	Closing Ceremony

== Medal overview ==
=== Men ===
Event		Gold		Silver		Bronze	
– 56 kg	Snatch	Florin Croitoru (ROM)	122 kg	İsmet Algül (TUR)	115 kg	Tom Goegebuer (BEL)	115 kg
– 56 kg	Clean & Jerk	Smbat Margaryan (ARM)	147 kg	Oleg Sîrghi (MDA)	146 kg	Mirco Scarantino (ITA)	143 kg
– 56 kg	Total	Florin Croitoru (ROM)	259 kg	Mirco Scarantino (ITA)	257 kg	Smbat Margaryan (ARM)	256 kg
– 62 kg	Snatch	Ivaylo Filev (BUL)	136 kg	Bünyamin Sezer (TUR)	135 kg	Stanislav Chadovich (BLR)	135 kg
– 62 kg	Clean & Jerk	Ivaylo Filev (BUL)	163 kg	Stoyan Enev (BUL)	160 kg	Stanislav Chadovich (BLR)	158 kg
– 62 kg	Total	Ivaylo Filev (BUL)	299 kg	Stanislav Chadovich (BLR)	293 kg	Stoyan Enev (BUL)	286 kg
– 69 kg	Snatch	Oleg Chen (RUS)	151 kg	Serghei Cechir (MDA)	143 kg	Feliks Khalibekov (RUS)	143 kg
– 69 kg	Clean & Jerk	Oleg Chen (RUS)	176 kg	Vanik Avetisyan (ARM)	175 kg	Serghei Cechir (MDA)	172 kg
– 69 kg	Total	Oleg Chen (RUS)	327 kg	Vanik Avetisyan (ARM)	315 kg	Serghei Cechir (MDA)	315 kg
– 77 kg	Snatch	Tigran Gevorg Martirosyan (ARM)	157 kg	Daniel Godelli (ALB)	157 kg	Erkand Qerimaj (ALB)	155 kg
– 77 kg	Clean & Jerk	Erkand Qerimaj (ALB)	194 kg	Daniel Godelli (ALB)	192 kg	Razmik Unanian (RUS)	192 kg
– 77 kg	Total	Erkand Qerimaj (ALB)	349 kg	Daniel Godelli (ALB)	349 kg	Razmik Unanian (RUS)	344 kg
– 85 kg	Snatch	Ivan Markov (BUL)	175 kg	Benjamin Hennequin (FRA)	161 kg	Karen Tovmasyan (NED)	156 kg
– 85 kg	Clean & Jerk	Ivan Markov (BUL)	210 kg	Benjamin Hennequin (FRA)	206 kg	Aghasi Aghasyan (ARM)	195 kg
– 85 kg	Total	Ivan Markov (BUL)	385 kg	Benjamin Hennequin (FRA)	367 kg	Aghasi Aghasyan (ARM)	345 kg
– 94 kg	Snatch	Adrian Zieliński (POL)	180 kg	Vasil Gospodinov (BUL)	174 kg	Redon Manushi (FRA)	170 kg
– 94 kg	Clean & Jerk	Tomasz Zieliński (POL)	210 kg	Adrian Zieliński (POL)	210 kg	Vasil Gospodinov (BUL)	205 kg
– 94 kg	Total	Adrian Zieliński (POL)	390 kg	Tomasz Zieliński (POL)	380 kg	Vasil Gospodinov (BUL)	379 kg
– 105 kg	Snatch	Andrei Aramnau (BLR)	184 kg	Andrey Demanov (RUS)	183 kg	Timur Naniev (RUS)	182 kg
– 105 kg	Clean & Jerk	Timur Naniev (RUS)	222 kg	Andrey Demanov (RUS)	222 kg	Arturs Plesnieks (LAT)	218 kg
– 105 kg	Total	Andrey Demanov (RUS)	405 kg	Timur Naniev (RUS)	404 kg	Andrei Aramnau (BLR)	396 kg
+ 105 kg	Snatch	Aleksei Lovchev (RUS)	205 kg	Marcin Dolega (POL)	192 kg	Gennady Muratov (RUS)	191 kg
+ 105 kg	Clean & Jerk	Aleksei Lovchev (RUS)	252 kg	Ruben Aleksanyan (ARM)	246 kg	Mart Seim (EST)	236 kg
+ 105 kg	Total	Aleksei Lovchev (RUS)	457 kg	Ruben Aleksanyan (ARM)	436 kg	Almir Velagic (GER)	423 kg

=== Women ===
Event		Gold		Silver		Bronze	
– 48 kg	Snatch	Genny Pagliaro (ITA)	82 kg	Marzena Karpinska (POL)	81 kg	Iana Diachenko (UKR)	81 kg
– 48 kg	Clean & Jerk	Genny Pagliaro (ITA)	98 kg	Marzena Karpinska (POL)	96 kg	Iana Diachenko (UKR)	94 kg
– 48 kg	Total	Genny Pagliaro (ITA)	180 kg	Marzena Karpinska (POL)	177 kg	Iana Diachenko (UKR)	175 kg
– 53 kg	Snatch	Yuliya Paratova (UKR)	88 kg	Manon Lorentz (FRA)	84 kg	Maya Ivanova (BUL)	83 kg
– 53 kg	Clean & Jerk	Ayşegül Çoban (TUR)	114 kg	Yuliya Paratova (UKR)	106 kg	Maya Ivanova (BUL)	102 kg
– 53 kg	Total	Ayşegül Çoban (TUR)	195 kg	Yuliya Paratova (UKR)	194 kg	Maya Ivanona (BUL)	185 kg
– 58 kg	Snatch	Elena Shadrina (RUS)	97 kg	Loredana Toma (ROM)	96 kg	Mariia Lubina (RUS)	91 kg
– 58 kg	Clean & Jerk	Elena Shadrina (RUS)	115 kg	Loredana Toma (ROM)	115 kg	Zoe Smith (GBR)	114 kg
– 58 kg	Total	Elena Shadrina (RUS)	212 kg	Loredana Toma (ROM)	211 kg	Zoe Smith (GBR)	204 kg
– 63 kg	Snatch	Tima Turieva (RUS)	105 kg	Yuliya Kalina (UKR)	103 kg	Nadezda Lomova (RUS)	103 kg
– 63 kg	Clean & Jerk	Tima Turieva (RUS)	131 kg	Nadezda Lomova (RUS)	130 kg	Yuliya Kalina (UKR)	125 kg
– 63 kg	Total	Tima Turieva (RUS)	236 kg	Nadezda Lomova (RUS)	233 kg	Yuliya Kalina (UKR)	228 kg
– 69 kg	Snatch	Dzina Sazanavets (BLR)	115 kg	Mădălina Molie (ROM)	105 kg	Nadiia Myroniuk (UKR)	104 kg
– 69 kg	Clean & Jerk	Dzina Sazanavets (BLR)	130 kg	Milka Maneva (BUL)	125 kg	Nadiia Myroniuk (UKR)	123 kg
– 69 kg	Total	Dzina Sazanavets (BLR)	245 kg	Milka Maneva (BUL)	228 kg	Nadiia Myroniuk (UKR)	227 kg
– 75 kg	Snatch	Lydia Valentin (ESP)	121 kg	Oxana Karpunenko (RUS)	121 kg	Natalia Priscepa (MDA)	102 kg
– 75 kg	Clean & Jerk	Lydia Valentin (ESP)	147 kg	Oxana Karpunenko (RUS)	143 kg	Ewa Mizdal (POL)	129 kg
– 75 kg	Total	Lydia Valentin (ESP)	268 kg	Oxana Karpunenko (RUS)	264 kg	Ewa Mizdal (POL)	230 kg
+ 75 kg	Snatch		~~143 kg~~	Yulia Konovalova (RUS)	115 kg	Andreea Aanei (ROU)	111 kg
+ 75 kg	Clean & Jerk		~~180 kg~~	Yulia Konovalova (RUS)	150 kg	Andreea Aanei (ROU)	138 kg
+ 75 kg	Total		~~323 kg~~	Yulia Konovalova (RUS)	265 kg	Andreea Aanei (ROU)	249 kg

== Participating countries ==
List of participating countries. In total 37 countries participate in this championships.

- Albania (4)
- Armenia (11)
- Austria (1)
- Belarus (7)
- Belgium (2)
- Bosnia and Herzegovina (1)
- Bulgaria (16)
- Croatia (3)
- Czech Republic (8)
- Denmark (5)
- Estonia (4)
- Finland (9)
- France (9)
- Georgia (3)
- Germany (8)
- Great Britain (7)
- Greece (3)
- Hungary (6)
- Iceland (1)
- Ireland (3)
- Israel (5)
- Italy (10)
- Latvia (2)
- Lithuania (4)
- Moldova (12)
- Netherlands (1)
- Norway (2)
- Poland (18)
- Romania (10)
- Russia (19)
- Serbia (2)
- Slovakia (5)
- Spain (11)
- Sweden (2)
- Switzerland (1)
- Turkey (21)
- Ukraine (16)
