= Andrian Zbîrnea =

Moldovan weightlifter

Personal information
- Nationality: Moldovan
- Born: 12 May 1990 (age 35)
- Weight: 104.52 kg (230.4 lb)

Sport
- Country: Moldova
- Sport: Weightlifting
- Team: National team
- Updated on 4 September 2016

Andrian Zbîrnea (born 12 May 1990) is a Moldovan male weightlifter, competing in the 105 kg category and representing Moldova at international competitions. He competed at world championships, most recently at the 2014 World Weightlifting Championships. At the 2015 European Weightlifting Championships Zbîrnea won the silver medal in overall ranking.

In June 2015 the International Weightlifting Federation (IWF) has suspended Adrian Zbîrnea in view of a potential anti-doping rule violation, after he returned a positive A sample for anabolic agents.

Currently, Andrian Zbîrnea coaches the University of Edinburgh WeightliftingClub in Scotland.

== Major results ==
Year	Venue	Weight	Snatch (kg)				Clean & Jerk (kg)				Total	Rank
Year	Venue	Weight	1	2	3	Rank	1	2	3	Rank	Total	Rank
World Championships
2014	Almaty, Kazakhstan	105 kg	175	180	~~185~~	8	210	215	~~220~~	10	395	9
World University Championships
2012	Eliat, Israel	105 kg	162	168	~~172~~	2	195	200	~~205~~	2	368	2
European Championships
2015	(Georgia (country)) Tbilisi, Georgia	105 kg	~~177~~	~~177~~	177	7	212	222	~~227~~	3	399	2
2013	Tirana, Albania	94 kg	~~163~~	163	168	3	~~190~~	190	200	5	358	4
