= Almir Velagić =

Bosnian-German weightlifter

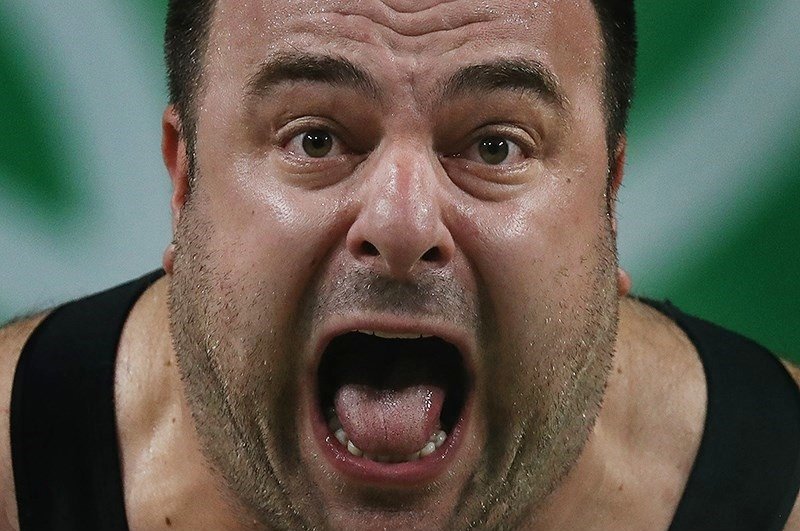

Personal information
- Born: 22 August 1981 (age 44) Livno, SR Bosnia and Herzegovina, SFR Yugoslavia
- Height: 1.83 m (6 ft 0 in)
- Weight: 140 kg (309 lb)

Sport
- Country: Germany
- Sport: Weightlifting
- Event: +105 kg
Medal record
Men's weightlifting
Representing Germany
European Championships
Silver medal – second place	2009 Bucharest	+105 kg
Bronze medal – third place	2014 Tel Aviv	+105 kg
Bronze medal – third place	2015 Tbilisi	+105 kg
- Updated on 26 July 2012

Almir Velagić (born 22 August 1981) is a Bosnian German weightlifter competing in the +105 kg category.

Velagić became a German citizen in 2000. He competed for Germany in weightlifting at the 2008 Summer Olympics, finishing 8th with a total of 413 kg.

At the 2009 European Championships Velagić won bronze medals in snatch and clean and jerk, and overall silver in the +105 kg category, with a total of 418 kg.

At the 2012 Summer Olympics, Velagić again finished 8th.

At the 2016 Summer Olympics, Velagić finished 9th in the super-heavyweight weight class.
