= Andreea Aanei =

Romanian weightlifter (born 1993)

Personal information
- Born: 18 November 1993 (age 32) Botoșani, Romania
- Height: 1.70 m (5 ft 7 in)
- Weight: 125 kg (276 lb)

Sport
- Country: Romania
- Sport: Weightlifting
- Event(s): Women's +75 kg, +90 kg
Medal record
Women's weightlifting
Representing Romania
European Championships
Bronze medal – third place	2014 Tel Aviv	+75 kg
Bronze medal – third place	2015 Tbilisi	+75 kg
Bronze medal – third place	2018 Bucharest	+90 kg

Andreea Aanei (born 18 November 1993) is a Romanian weightlifter. She competed in the women's +75 kg event at the 2016 Summer Olympics.
