= Erkand Qerimaj =

Albanian weightlifter (born 1988)

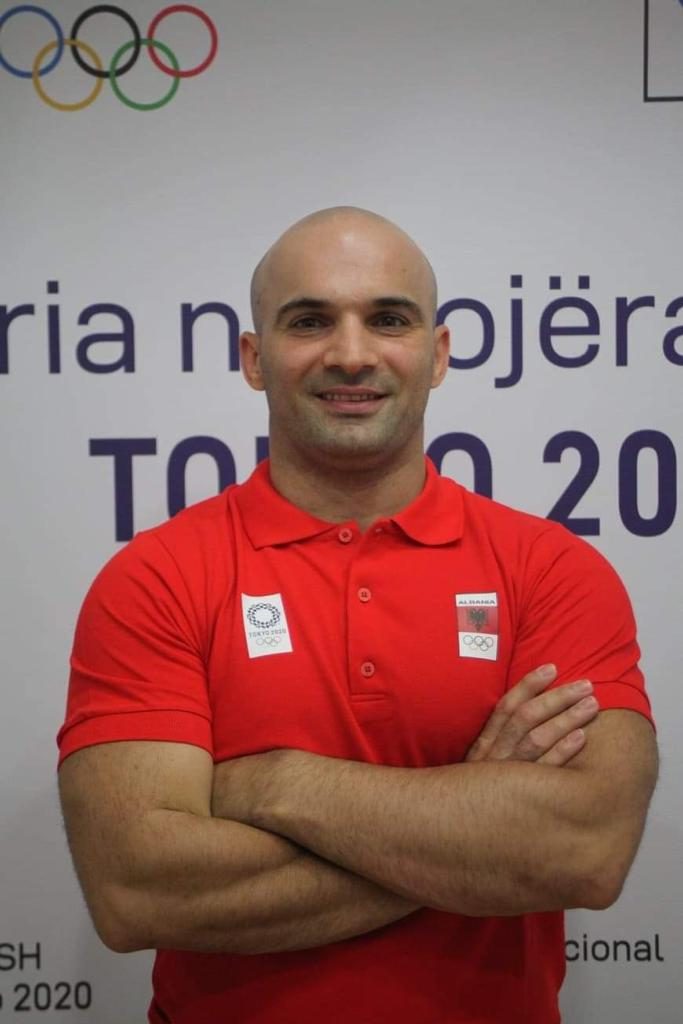

Personal information
- Full name: Erkand Mehdi Qerimaj
- Nationality: Albanian
- Born: 10 August 1988 (age 38) Shkodër, PSR Albania
- Occupation
- Military career
- Allegiance: Albania
- Branch: Albanian Armed Forces
- Service years: 2023–
- Rank: Colonel
- Height: 1.68 m (5 ft 6 in)
- Weight: 75 kg (165 lb)

Sport
- Country: Albanian
- Sport: Olympic weightlifting
- Event: 75 kg
Medal record
Men's weightlifting
Representing Albania
European Championships
Gold medal – first place	2014 Tel Aviv	77 kg
Silver medal – second place	2009 Bucharest	77 kg
Bronze medal – third place	2017 Split	77 kg
Bronze medal – third place	2010 Minsk	77 kg
Mediterranean Games
Gold medal – first place	2009 Pescara	77 kg S
Silver medal – second place	2009 Pescara	77 kg CJ
Silver medal – second place	2022 Oran	73 kg S
World Junior Championships
Silver medal – second place	2006 Hangzhou	77kg
Silver medal – second place	2007 Prague	77kg
European Junior Championships
Gold medal – first place	2008 Durrës	77 kg

Erkand Mehdi Qerimaj (born 10 August 1988) is an Albanian weightlifter.

== Competition results ==
At the 2008 European Championships he ranked 4th in the 77 kg category, with a total of 345 kg.

Qerimaj competed in Weightlifting at the 2008 Summer Olympics in the 77 kg division finishing thirteenth with 341 kg.

He is 5 ft 5 inches tall and weighs 170 lb.

In the 2012 European Weightlifting Championships that was held in Antalya, Turkey, Erkand Qerimaj competed in the 77 kg category. He won silver in Snatch, gold in Clean & Jerk and gold in total with 348 kg, ahead of Razvan Martin of Romania. Later on Erkand Qerimaj, resulted positive in the anti-doping test at the European Championship in Antalya and was disqualified.

In the 2014 European Weightlifting Championships that were held in Israel, Qerimaj won bronze in Snatch, gold in Clean & Jerk and gold in total with 349 kg. Silver medalist Daniel Godelli lifted the same total weight as Qerimaj, but with a slightly heavier body weight than Qerimaj took second place, leaving to Qerimaj the gold.

In the 2015 World Weightlifting Championships in Houston, Texas, Qerimaj competed in the 77 kg category. He lifted 154 kg in Snatch and 188 kg in Clean & Jerk for a total of 342 kg. He won 12th place overall.

He won the silver medal in the men's 73 kg Snatch event at the 2022 Mediterranean Games held in Oran, Algeria.

== Personal life ==
Qerimaj is currently on a relationship with his fiancée Tedi Kalaja. He became a father for the first time on 22 January 2017 when his partner gave birth to the couple's first son, named Dijar. He stated that he named his son after the Albanian word "Dije" (English: Lore).
