= 2015 European Weightlifting Championships =

International weightlifting competition

- Location: Georgia, Tbilisi
- Dates: 10–18 April

The 2015 European Weightlifting Championships were held in Tbilisi, Georgia from 10 April to 18 April 2015.

== Medals tables ==
Ranking by "Big" (Total result) medals

* Host nation (Georgia)

| Rank | Nation | Gold | Silver | Bronze | Total |
|---|---|---|---|---|---|
| 1 | Turkey | 2 | 1 | 1 | 4 |
| 2 | Ukraine | 2 | 1 | 0 | 3 |
| 3 | Azerbaijan | 2 | 0 | 1 | 3 |
| 4 | France | 1 | 1 | 2 | 4 |
| 4 | Poland | 1 | 1 | 2 | 4 |
| 6 | Armenia | 1 | 1 | 1 | 3 |
| 7 | Moldova | 1 | 1 | 0 | 2 |
| 8 | Belarus | 1 | 0 | 3 | 4 |
| 9 | Georgia* | 1 | 0 | 0 | 1 |
| 9 | Lithuania | 1 | 0 | 0 | 1 |
| 9 | Spain | 1 | 0 | 0 | 1 |
| 12 | Russia | 0 | 5 | 1 | 6 |
| 13 | Germany | 0 | 2 | 0 | 2 |
| 14 | Italy | 0 | 1 | 2 | 3 |
| 14 | Romania | 0 | 1 | 2 | 3 |
| Totals (15 entries) | | 14 | 15 | 15 | 44 |

Ranking by all medals: "Big" (Total result) and "Small" (Snatch and Clean&Jerk)

* Host nation (Georgia)

| Rank | Nation | Gold | Silver | Bronze | Total |
|---|---|---|---|---|---|
| 1 | Azerbaijan | 7 | 0 | 2 | 9 |
| 2 | Ukraine | 6 | 3 | 1 | 10 |
| 3 | Turkey | 5 | 3 | 4 | 12 |
| 4 | Spain | 4 | 1 | 0 | 5 |
| 5 | Poland | 3 | 3 | 4 | 10 |
| 6 | Belarus | 3 | 2 | 4 | 9 |
| 7 | Moldova | 3 | 1 | 2 | 6 |
| 8 | Georgia* | 3 | 0 | 0 | 3 |
| 8 | Lithuania | 3 | 0 | 0 | 3 |
| 10 | France | 2 | 4 | 4 | 10 |
| 11 | Armenia | 2 | 4 | 2 | 8 |
| 12 | Italy | 1 | 2 | 5 | 8 |
| 13 | Russia | 0 | 15 | 5 | 20 |
| 14 | Romania | 0 | 3 | 6 | 9 |
| 15 | Germany | 0 | 3 | 2 | 5 |
| 16 | Cyprus | 0 | 1 | 0 | 1 |
| 17 | Hungary | 0 | 0 | 2 | 2 |
| 18 | Latvia | 0 | 0 | 1 | 1 |
| 18 | Norway | 0 | 0 | 1 | 1 |
| Totals (19 entries) | | 42 | 45 | 45 | 132 |

== Medal overview ==
=== Men ===
| Event | | Gold | | Silver | | Bronze | |
| – 56 kg | Snatch | Josué Brachi (ESP) | 118 kg | Mirco Scarantino (ITA) | 118 kg | İsmet Algül (TUR) | 114 kg |
| – 56 kg | Clean & Jerk | Oleg Sîrghi (MDA) | 151 kg | Smbat Margaryan (ARM) | 146 kg | Mirco Scarantino (ITA) | 141 kg |
| – 56 kg | Total | Oleg Sîrghi (MDA) | 264 kg | Smbat Margaryan (ARM) | 259 kg | Mirco Scarantino (ITA) | 259 kg |
| – 62 kg | Snatch | Valentin Hristov (AZE) | 135 kg | Florin Croitoru (ROU) | 134 kg | Bünyamin Sezer (TUR) | 134 kg |
| – 62 kg | Clean & Jerk | Valentin Hristov (AZE) | 160 kg | Dimitris Minasidis (CYP) | 156 kg | Emrah Aydın (TUR) | 155 kg |
| – 62 kg | Total | Valentin Hristov (AZE) | 295 kg | Bünyamin Sezer (TUR) | 288 kg | Florin Croitoru (ROU) | 287 kg |
| – 69 kg | Snatch | Daniyar Ismayilov (TUR) | 156 kg | Bernardin Kingue Matam (FRA) | 146 kg | Sergei Petrov (RUS) | 146 kg |
| – 69 kg | Clean & Jerk | Daniyar Ismayilov (TUR) | 181 kg | Sergei Petrov (RUS) | 176 kg | Bernardin Kingue Matam (FRA) | 175 kg |
| – 69 kg | Total | Daniyar Ismayilov (TUR) | 337 kg | Sergei Petrov (RUS) | 322 kg | Bernardin Kingue Matam (FRA) | 321 kg |
| – 77 kg | Snatch | Andranik Karapetyan (ARM) | 164 kg | Tigran Martirosyan (ARM) | 160 kg | Victor Getts (RUS) | 160 kg |
| – 77 kg | Clean & Jerk | Afgan Bayramov (AZE) | 192 kg | Tigran Martirosyan (ARM) | 191 kg | Victor Getts (RUS) | 191 kg |
| – 77 kg | Total | Tigran Martirosyan (ARM) | 351 kg | Victor Getts (RUS) | 351 kg | Andranik Karapetyan (ARM) | 350 kg |
| – 85 kg | Snatch | Iurie Bulat (MDA) | 172 kg | Mikalai Novikau (BLR) | 166 kg | Alexandru Dudoglo (MDA) | 165 kg |
| – 85 kg | Clean & Jerk | Benjamin Hennequin (FRA) | 202 kg | Alexey Yufkin (RUS) | 198 kg | Alexandru Dudoglo (MDA) | 197 kg |
| – 85 kg | Total | Benjamin Hennequin (FRA) | 367 kg | Alexandru Dudoglo (MDA) | 362 kg | Mikalai Novikau (BLR) | 361 kg |
| – 94 kg | Snatch | Aurimas Didžbalis (LTU) | 182 kg | Khetag Khugaev (RUS) | 180 kg | Łukasz Grela (POL) | 178 kg |
| – 94 kg | Clean & Jerk | Aurimas Didžbalis (LTU) | 221 kg | Khetag Khugaev (RUS) | 219 kg | Aliaksandr Venskel (BLR) | 209 kg |
| – 94 kg | Total | Aurimas Didžbalis (LTU) | 403 kg | Khetag Khugaev (RUS) | 399 kg | Aliaksandr Venskel (BLR) | 386 kg |
| – 105 kg | Snatch | Bartłomiej Bonk (POL) | 185 kg | Gennady Muratov (RUS) | 183 kg | Simon Martirosyan (ARM) | 181 kg |
| – 105 kg | Clean & Jerk | Arkadiusz Michalski (POL) | 227 kg | Bartłomiej Bonk (POL) | 223 kg | Artūrs Plēsnieks (LAT) | 221 kg |
| – 105 kg | Total | Bartłomiej Bonk (POL) | 408 kg | Arkadiusz Michalski (POL) | 399 kg | Gennady Muratov (RUS) | 398 kg |
| + 105 kg | Snatch | Irakli Turmanidze (GEO) | 201 kg | Almir Velagic (GER) | 193 kg | Péter Nagy (HUN) | 189 kg |
| + 105 kg | Clean & Jerk | Irakli Turmanidze (GEO) | 234 kg | Daniel Dołęga (POL) | 230 kg | Péter Nagy (HUN) | 228 kg |
| + 105 kg | Total | Irakli Turmanidze (GEO) | 435 kg | Almir Velagić (GER) | 418 kg | Daniel Dołęga (POL) | 417 kg |

=== Women ===
| Event | | Gold | | Silver | | Bronze | |
| – 48 kg | Snatch | Genny Pagliaro (ITA) | 81 kg | Sibel Özkan (TUR) | 80 kg | Iana Diachenko (UKR) | 80 kg |
| – 48 kg | Clean & Jerk | Sibel Özkan (TUR) | 99 kg | Anaïs Michel (FRA) | 98 kg | Monica Csengeri (ROU) | 98 kg |
| – 48 kg | Total | Sibel Özkan (TUR) | 179 kg | Genny Pagliaro (ITA) | 176 kg | Anaïs Michel (FRA) | 174 kg |
| – 53 kg | Snatch | Iulia Paratova (UKR) | 90 kg | Atenery Hernández (ESP) | 83 kg | Julia Schwarzbach (GER) | 83 kg |
| – 53 kg | Clean & Jerk | Iulia Paratova (UKR) | 110 kg | Ayşegül Çoban (TUR) | 109 kg | Julia Schwarzbach (GER) | 103 kg |
| – 53 kg | Total | Iulia Paratova (UKR) | 200 kg | Julia Schwarzbach (GER) | 186 kg | Ayşegül Çoban (TUR) | 184 kg |
| – 58 kg | Snatch | Boyanka Kostova (AZE) | 109 kg ER | Natalia Grishina (RUS) | 93 kg | Irina Lepșa (ROU) | 91 kg |
| – 58 kg | Clean & Jerk | Boyanka Kostova (AZE) | 137 kg ER | Irina Lepșa (ROU) | 114 kg | Aleksandra Klejnowska (POL) | 113 kg |
| – 58 kg | Total | Boyanka Kostova (AZE) | 246 kg ER | Irina Lepșa (ROU) | 205 kg | Aleksandra Klejnowska (POL) | 202 kg |
| – 63 kg | Snatch | Yuliya Kalina (UKR) | 106 kg | Nadezda Likhacheva (RUS) | 105 kg | Giorgia Bordignon (ITA) | 97 kg |
| – 63 kg | Clean & Jerk | Yuliya Kalina (UKR) | 132 kg | Nadezda Likhacheva (RUS) | 118 kg | Giorgia Bordignon (ITA) | 117 kg |
| – 63 kg | Total | Yuliya Kalina (UKR) | 238 kg | Nadezda Likhacheva (RUS) | 223 kg | Giorgia Bordignon (ITA) | 214 kg |
| – 69 kg | Snatch | Dzina Sazanavets (BLR) | 115 kg | Iana Kondrashova (RUS) | 105 kg | Ruth Kasirye (NOR) | 105 kg |
| – 69 kg | Clean & Jerk | Dzina Sazanavets (BLR) | 140 kg | Iana Kondrashova (RUS) | 130 kg | Anastassiya Ibrahimli (AZE) | 130 kg |
| – 69 kg | Total | Dzina Sazanavets (BLR) | 255 kg | Iana Kondrashova (RUS) | 235 kg | Anastassiya Ibrahimli (AZE) | 233 kg |
| – 75 kg | Snatch | Lydia Valentín (ESP) | 118 kg | Darya Pachabut (BLR) | 117 kg | Gaëlle Nayo-Ketchanke (FRA) | 111 kg |
| – 75 kg | Clean & Jerk | Lydia Valentín (ESP) | 145 kg | Gaëlle Nayo-Ketchanke (FRA) | 137 kg | Ekaterina Iutvolina (RUS) | 133 kg |
| – 75 kg | Total | Lydia Valentín (ESP) | 263 kg | Gaëlle Nayo-Ketchanke (FRA) | 248 kg | Darya Pachabut (BLR) | 247 kg |
| + 75 kg | Snatch | | ~~142 kg~~ | Anastasiya Lysenko (UKR) | 126 kg | Andreea Aanei (ROU) | 120 kg |
| + 75 kg | Clean & Jerk | | ~~180 kg~~ | Anastasiya Lysenko (UKR) | 154 kg | Andreea Aanei (ROU) | 141 kg |
| + 75 kg | Total | | ~~322 kg~~ | Anastasiya Lysenko (UKR) | 280 kg | Andreea Aanei (ROU) | 261 kg |

== Participating countries ==
List of participating countries. In total 38 countries participate in this championships.

- Albania (2)
- Armenia (10)
- Austria (2)
- Azerbaijan (6)
- Belarus (11)
- Belgium (2)
- Bulgaria (1)
- Croatia (5)
- Cyprus (1)
- Czech Republic (6)
- Denmark (9)
- Estonia (3)
- Finland (12)
- France (5)
- Georgia (10)
- Germany (4)
- Great Britain (2)
- Greece (3)
- Hungary (7)
- Ireland (9)
- Israel (2)
- Italy (8)
- Kosovo (1)
- Latvia (3)
- Lithuania (5)
- Moldova (9)
- Netherlands (2)
- Norway (4)
- Poland (15)
- Romania (8)
- Russia (15)
- Serbia (2)
- Slovakia (4)
- Slovenia (1)
- Spain (9)
- Sweden (3)
- Turkey (15)
- Ukraine (15)
