= Krisztina Magát =

Hungarian weightlifter (born 1989)

Personal information
- Nationality: Hungarian
- Born: 2 March 1989 (age 37) Budapest, Hungary
- Weight: 110 kg (240 lb)

Sport
- Country: Hungary
- Sport: Weightlifting
- Event: +90 kg
Medal record
Women's weightlifting
Representing Hungary
European Championships
Silver medal – second place	2018 Bucharest	+90 kg
Bronze medal – third place	2017 Split	+90 kg
Bronze medal – third place	2013 Tirana	+75 kg
- Updated on 2 April 2018

Krisztina Magát (born 2 March 1989 in Budapest, Hungary) is a Hungarian weightlifter. Her best results was silver medal at the 2018 European Weightlifting Championships in Bucharest.

== Major results ==
Year	Venue	Weight	Snatch (kg)				Clean & Jerk (kg)				Total	Rank
Year	Venue	Weight	1	2	3	Rank	1	2	3	Rank	Total	Rank
Representing Hungary
World Championships
2018	Ashgabat, Turkmenistan	87 kg	94	98	~~100~~	11	~~117~~	117	~~121~~	14	215	12
2017	Anaheim, United States	+90 kg	100	~~103~~	~~104~~	8	120	128	~~133~~	8	228	8
2011	Paris, France	+75 kg	96	100	102	18	~~119~~	~~119~~	~~119~~	—	—	—
2010	Antalya, Turkey	+75 kg	91	95	98	19	115	120	124	18	222	18
2009	Goyang, South Korea	+75 kg	90	95	97	18	110	~~115~~	~~116~~	19	207	19
European Championships
2019	(Georgia (country)) Batumi, Georgia	87 kg	92	95	~~97~~	5	114	117	~~120~~	6	212	6
2018	Bucharest, Romania	+90 kg	96	101	104	1st place, gold medalist(s)	126	130	132	2nd place, silver medalist(s)	236	2nd place, silver medalist(s)
2017	Split, Croatia	+90 kg	97	101	104	3rd place, bronze medalist(s)	120	126	130	3rd place, bronze medalist(s)	234	3rd place, bronze medalist(s)
2013	Tirana, Albania	+75 kg	93	96	~~99~~	3rd place, bronze medalist(s)	115	121	124	3rd place, bronze medalist(s)	220	(bronze) *
2012	Antalya, Turkey	+75 kg	90	96	~~99~~	5	117	123	~~126~~	6	219	6
2010	Minsk, Belarus	+75 kg	85	90	~~93~~	11	110	115	~~116~~	11	205	11
2009	Bucharest, Romania	+75 kg	85	88	90	11	103	~~107~~	~~107~~	11	193	11
Universiade
2011	Shenzhen, China	+75 kg	95	101	~~106~~	4	120	~~126~~	126	4	227	4

* After the competition she was fourth place, but later the originally gold medallist Ukrainian Svitlana Cherniavska was disqualified.

== Doping sanction ==
In August 2013 Magát had produce positive doping test at the out of competition control. She used Oxandrolone and she was banned between 23. 09. 2013 - 23. 09. 2015.

== Personal life ==
Magát is a kindergarten teacher, in Budapest.
