= Alessandra Pagliaro =

Italian weightlifter (born 1997)

Personal information
- Nationality: Italian
- Born: 16 July 1997 (age 28) Caltanissetta, Italy
- Height: 1.43 m (4 ft 8 in)
- Weight: 45.5 kg (100 lb)

Sport
- Sport: Weightlifting
- Event: Women's 48 kg
- Club: Fiamme Rosse
Medal record
European Championships
Bronze medal – third place	2018 Bucharest	Snatch –48 kg
Mediterranean Games
Bronze medal – third place	2018 Tarragona	Snatch −48 kg

Alessandra Pagliaro (born 16 July 1997) is an Italian weightlifter bronze medal at the 2018 European Weightlifting Championships.

== Biography ==
Pagliaro is the sister of the other Italian weightlifting champion Genny Pagliaro. In addition to the European medal, at international senior level she won also a bronze medal, at the 2018 Mediterranean Games.
