= Nicolae Onică =

Romanian weightlifter (born 1993)

Personal information
- Nationality: Romanian
- Born: 24 June 1993 (age 33)
- Weight: 95.22 kg (210 lb)

Sport
- Country: Romania
- Sport: Weightlifting
- Event: –96 kg
- Club: CS Dinamo Bucharest
Medal record
World Championships
Bronze medal – third place	2018 Ashgabat	–96 kg
European Championships
Gold medal – first place	2018 Bucharest	-94 kg

Nicolae Onică (born 24 June 1993) is a Romanian weightlifter.

He participated at the 2018 World Weightlifting Championships, winning a medal. He is also European champion in 2018 in 94 kg category.
