= Nadezda Lomova =

Russian weightlifter (born 1991)

Personal information
- Full name: Nadezhda Andreevna Lomova
- Born: 19 January 1991 (age 35) Novgorod, Russia
- Weight: 63 kg (139 lb)

Sport
- Sport: Weightlifting
Medal record
Women's weightlifting
Representing Russia
European Championships
Silver medal – second place	2014 Tel Aviv	-63 kg

Nadezhda Andreevna Lomova (Russian: Надежда Андреевна Ломова; born 19 January 1991) is a Russian weightlifter. She won a silver medal in the 63 kg division at the 2014 European Weightlifting Championships. In 2019 she tested positive for Metenolone metabolites and is banned by the International Weightlifting Federation until 2027.
