= Smbat Margaryan =

Armenian weightlifter (born 1993)

Medal record

Men's Weightlifting

Representing Armenia

Youth Olympic Games
Bronze medal – third place	2010 Singapore	-56 kg

European Championships
Silver medal – second place	2010 Minsk	-56 kg
Silver medal – second place	2015 Tbilisi	-56 kg
Bronze medal – third place	2014 Tel Aviv	-56 kg

Smbat Margaryan (Armenian: Սմբատ Մարգարյան; born March 17, 1993, in Yerevan, Armenia) is an Armenian weightlifter.

Margaryan won a bronze medal at the 2010 Summer Youth Olympics.
