= Khetag Khugaev =

Russian weightlifter (born 1997)

Personal information
- Nationality: Russia
- Born: 21 October 1997 (age 29)
- Weight: 96.00 kg (211.64 lb)

Sport
- Country: Russia
- Sport: Weightlifting
- Event: –96 kg
Medal record
European Championships
Silver medal – second place	2015 Tbilisi	–94 kg
Junior World Championships
Gold medal – first place	2015 Wrocław	—94 kg
Youth Olympic Games
Gold medal – first place	2014 Nanjing	–85 kg

Khetag Khugaev (born 21 October 1997) is a Russian weightlifter, competing in the 94 kg category until 2018 and 96 kg starting in 2018 after the International Weightlifting Federation reorganized the categories.

== Career ==
In 2014, he competed at the 2014 Summer Youth Olympic Games in the 85 kg category, winning the gold medal.

At the 2015 European Weightlifting Championships he competed in the 94 kg category, winning a silver medal in the snatch, clean & jerk and total.

== Major results ==
Year	Venue	Weight	Snatch (kg)				Clean & Jerk (kg)				Total	Rank
Year	Venue	Weight	1	2	3	Rank	1	2	3	Rank	Total	Rank
European Championships
2015	(Georgia (country)) Tbilisi, Georgia	94 kg	172	176	180	2nd place, silver medalist(s)	207	212	219	2nd place, silver medalist(s)	399	2nd place, silver medalist(s)
