= Žygimantas Stanulis =

Lithuanian weightlifter (born 1993)

Medal record

Men's Weightlifting

Representing Lithuania

European Championships
Silver medal – second place	2013 Tirana	– 94 kg
Silver medal – second place	2016 Førde	– 94 kg
Disqualified	2018 Bucharest	– 94 kg

Summer Universiade
Bronze medal – third place	2013 Kazan	– 94 kg

European U23 Championships
Gold medal – first place	2015 Klaipėda	– 94 kg
Silver medal – second place	2014 Limassol	– 94 kg

European Junior Championships
Gold medal – first place	2012 Eilat	– 94 kg

Žygimantas Stanulis (born 11 January 1993) is a retired Lithuanian weightlifter who won a silver medal at the 2013 European Weightlifting Championships in Tirana.

He competed in the 2011 World Weightlifting Championships – Men's 105 kg, the 2014 World Weightlifting Championships – Men's 94 kg, and the 2015 World Weightlifting Championships – Men's 94 kg events.

In 2020 Stanulis was disqualified to doping rules violations. Stanulis retired from competitive weightlifting in March 2022.
