= Răzvan Martin =

Romanian weightlifter

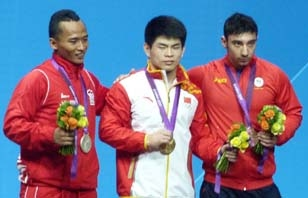
- Martin (right) at the 2012 Olympics

Personal information
- Full name: Răzvan Constantin Martin
- Born: 22 December 1991 (age 34) Cluj-Napoca, Romania
- Height: 1.58 m (5 ft 2 in)

Sport
- Country: Romania
- Sport: Weightlifting
- Club: MSC Bistrița Cluj-Napoca
- Coached by: Mugur Saranciuc
Medal record
Representing Romania
Olympic Games
Disqualified	2012 London	–69 kg
European Championships
Gold medal – first place	2012 Antalya	–77 kg
Gold medal – first place	2011 Kazan	–69 kg
Silver medal – second place	2017 Split	–77 kg
Silver medal – second place	2018 Bucharest	–77 kg

Răzvan Constantin Martin (Romanian pronunciation: [rəzˈvan marˈtin]; born 22 December 1991) is a Romanian weightlifter. He competed at the 2008 and 2012 Olympics and won a bronze medal in 2012.

On 25 November 2020, the reanalysed doping tests from the 2012 Summer Olympics turned out positive for dehydrochlormethyltestosterone, metenolone and stanozolol, and he was stripped of his medal.

In the 2012 European Championships, he originally won a silver in the −77 kg division, but was later awarded the gold medal because Erkand Qerimaj was banned for doping use. In 2013 Martin himself was suspended for doping violations.
