= Tomasz Zieliński =

Polish weightlifter (born 1990)

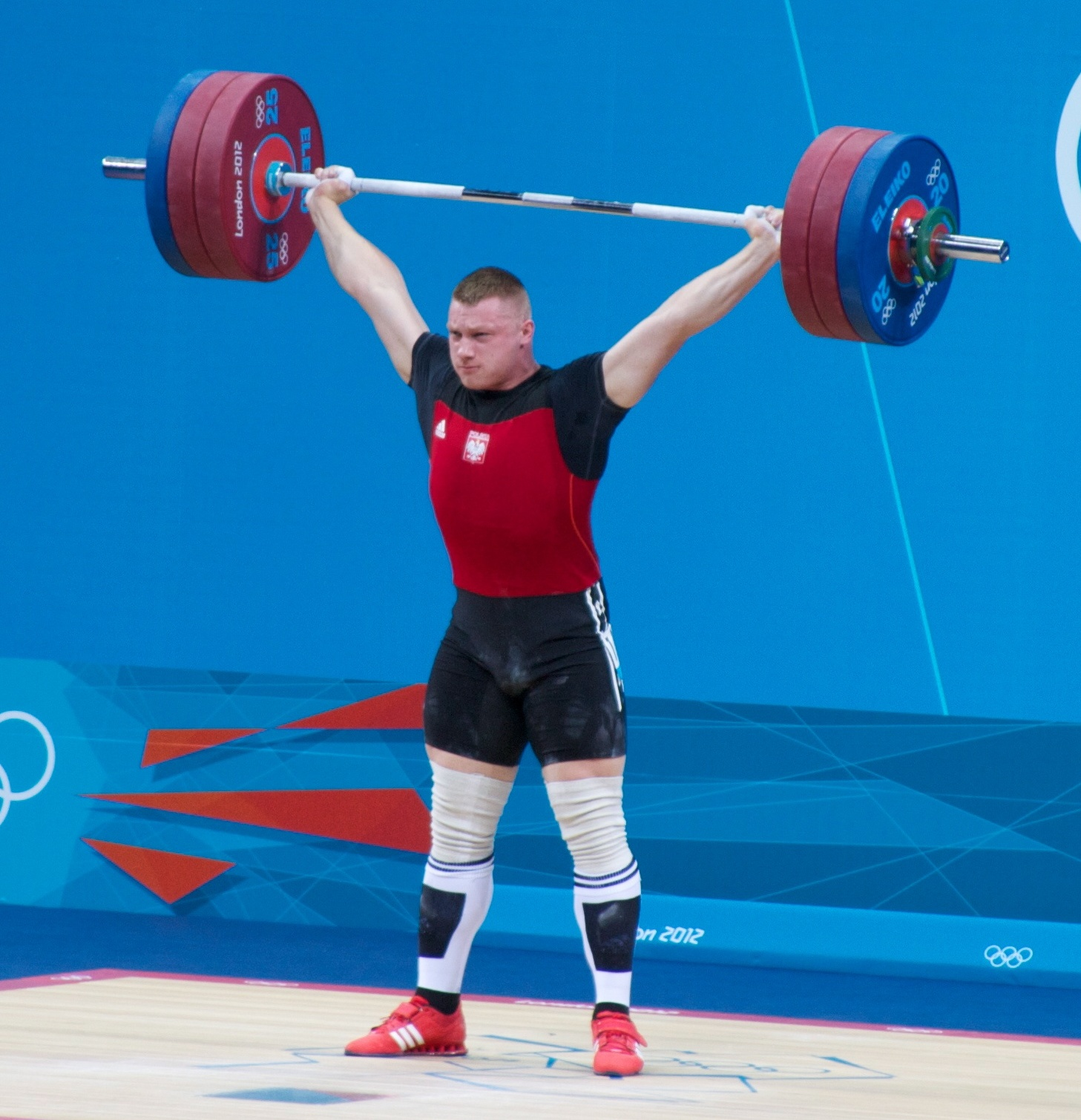

Personal information
- Full name: Tomasz Bernard Zieliński
- Born: 29 October 1990 (age 36) Nakło nad Notecią, Poland
Medal record
Men's weightlifting
Representing Poland
Olympic Games
Bronze medal – third place	2012 London	94 kg
European Championships
Gold medal – first place	2016 Førde	−94 kg
Silver medal – second place	2014 Tel Aviv	−94 kg
- Updated on 11 April 2014

Tomasz Bernard Zieliński (Polish pronunciation: [ˈtɔmaʐ ˈbɛrnard ʑɛˈlij̃skʲi]; born 29 October 1990 in Nakło nad Notecią) is a retired Polish weightlifter. He won gold at the 2016 European Championships in the −94 kg category.

== Personal life ==
Zieliński was born 29 October 1990 in Nakło nad Notecią. He is the brother of Adrian Zieliński, who is also a weightlifter.

== Career ==
Zieliński represented Poland at the 2012 Summer Olympics in London. He placed 9th in the men's 94 kg event but was eventually awarded the bronze medal as 6 athletes ahead him tested positive for performance-enhancing drugs when their 2012 samples were retested in 2016.

Competing in the −94 kg category, Zieliński won silver at the 2014 European Championships in Tel Aviv and gold at the 2016 European Championships in Førde. He was included in Poland's squad to the 2016 Summer Olympics after the national weightlifting federation's board over-ruled its own president, Szymon Kołecki, who had wanted him off the team after Zieliński decided to train outside the federation's framework. At the Olympics in Rio, Zieliński tested positive for spironolactone and was sent home. He was subsequently banned for four years.
