= Oleg Sîrghi =

Moldovan weightlifter (born 1987)

Personal information
- Nationality: Moldova
- Born: 9 July 1987 (age 38) Krasnoyarsk

Sport
- Country: Moldova
- Sport: Weightlifting
- Event: 56 kg
Medal record
Representing Moldova
European Championships
Gold medal – first place	2011 Kazan	–56 kg
Gold medal – first place	2013 Tirana	–56 kg
Gold medal – first place	2015 Tbilisi	-56 kg
Silver medal – second place	2012 Antalya	–56 kg
- Updated on 12 April 2015

Oleg Sîrghi (born 9 July 1987) is a Moldovan weightlifter. He won two gold medals at the European Championships from weightlifting Kazan (2011) and Tirana (2013), as well as a silver medal at the European weightlifting Championships at Antalya (2012), the weight category under 56 kg.

Oleg Sîrghi was named athlete of the year 2013 in Moldova by the Ministry of youth and sports.

Oleg was born in Krasnoyarsk but moved to live in Moldova. He started to practic weightlifting at the age of 10 years old and participates at international competitions since 14 years old. He tried several types of sport, but chose weightlifting because of his father, who is also a professional in the field.
