= Iulia Paratova =

Ukrainian weightlifter (born 1986)

Personal information
- Full name: Iulia Yevhenivna Paratova
- Born: 7 November 1986 (age 39)
- Height: 1.55 m (5 ft 1 in)
- Weight: 48 kg (106 lb)

Sport
- Country: Ukraine
- Sport: Weightlifting
- Event: Women's 53 kg
Medal record
Olympic Games
Bronze medal – third place	2012 London	–53 kg
European Championships
Gold medal – first place	2013 Tirana	–53 kg
Gold medal – first place	2015 Tbilisi	–53 kg
Silver medal – second place	2011 Kazan	–58 kg
Silver medal – second place	2014 Tel Aviv	–53 kg
Silver medal – second place	2016 Førde	–53 kg

Iulia Yevhenivna Paratova (Ukrainian: Юлія Євгенівна Паратова; also transliterated Yuliya; born 7 November 1986 in Odessa) is a Ukrainian weightlifter. She competed at the 2012 Summer Olympics in the Women's 53 kg, finishing 3rd after gold medallist Zulfiya Chinshanlo and bronze medallist Cristina Iovu were both disqualified. Paratova also competed for Ukraine at the 2016 Summer Olympics.
