= Jiří Orság =

Czech weightlifter (born 1989)

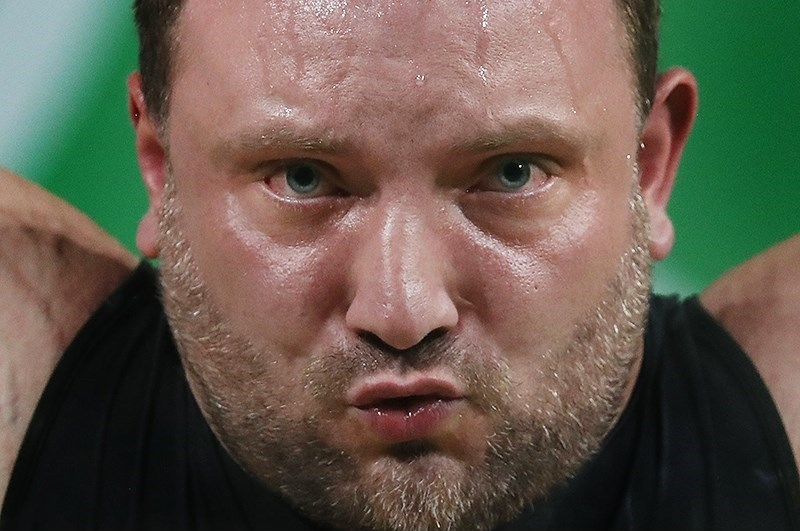

Personal information
- Born: January 5, 1989 (age 37)
- Height: 1.81 m (5 ft 11 1/2 in)
- Weight: 127 kg (280 lb)

Sport
- Country: Czech Republic
- Sport: Weightlifting
- Event(s): +105 kg, 105 kg
Medal record
Representing Czech Republic
Men's weightlifting
European Championships
Silver medal – second place	2011 Kazan	+105 kg
Silver medal – second place	2018 Bucharest	+105 kg
Bronze medal – third place	2013 Tirana	+105 kg

Jiří Orság (Czech pronunciation: [ˈjɪr̝iː ˈorsaːk]; born 5 January 1989 in Znojmo) is a Czech weightlifter.

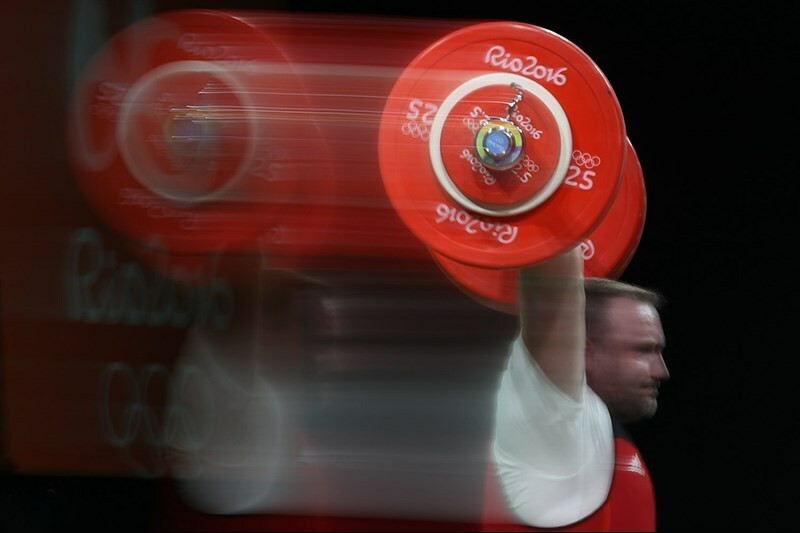

== Career ==
In 2014 Orság was sanctioned for the use of Tamoxifen. After the sanction he stopped training for 6 months; during this time he began a different healthy lifestyle, losing 12 kg and earning a certificate in bodybuilding and becoming a fitness instructor. He struggled upon returning to training, telling an interviewer it was like as if he hadn't touched it in 10 years. For the first few weeks he was working on technique and the movements, but muscle memory helped speed up the process and after two months he was able to snatch 150 kg. Training by himself in 2015, he reached a 185 kg snatch, 5 kg below his best, and a 220 kg Clean and Jerk (20 kg below his best). During this period of training, Orság was motivated by the goal of competing at the 2015 WWC and the 2016 EWC, competitions required to qualify for the 2016 Summer Olympics in Rio de Janeiro.

== Accomplishments in sport ==
Date of Competition	Competition Name	Placing	Weight Category	Actual Bodyweight	Best Snatch	Best Clean and Jerk	Total
2016	XXXI OLYMPIC GAMES	8	+105 kg	127.27	185	240	425
2016	2016 EUROPEAN CHAMPIONSHIPS	4	+105 kg	126.10	184	238	422
2016	6th RUSSIAN FEDERATION PRESIDENT'S CUP - IWF GRAND PRIX	3	+105 kg	122.90	180	234	414
2015	IWF GRAND PRIX 5th RUSSIAN FEDERATION PRESIDENT'S CUP	3	+105 kg	122.78	180	239	419
2015	2015 IWF WORLD CHAMPIONSHIPS	12	+105 kg	125.85	185	230	415
2013	EUROPEAN CHAMPIONSHIPS	3	+105 kg	125.16	185	237	422
2012	2012 IWF GRAND PRIX - PRESIDENT'S CUP	1	+105 kg	126.75	182	230	412
2012	XXX OLYMPIC GAMES	7	+105 kg	128.15	187	239	426
2012	EUROPEAN CHAMPIONSHIPS	5	+105 kg	125.93	183	235	418
2011	EUROPEAN U 23 CHAMPIONSHIPS	1	+105 kg	124.77	176	229	405
2011	90TH MEN AND 24TH WOMEN EUROPEAN CHAMPIONSHIPS	1	+105 kg	119.04	184	226	410
2010	EUROPEAN U 23 CHAMPIONSHIPS	2	+105 kg	121.70	181	226	407
2010	78th MEN's and 21st WOMEN's WORLD CHAMPIONSHIPS	14	+105 kg	121.84	180	215	395
2010	LAUGARICIO CUP	1	+105 kg	122.00	170	220	390
2010	EUROPEAN CHAMPIONSHIPS	6	+105 kg	121.10	180	227	407
2009	77th MEN's and 20th WOMEN's WORLD CHAMPIONSHIPS	8	+105 kg	122.95	170	218	388
2009	EUROPEAN U23 CHAMPIONSHIPS	6	+105 kg	123.30	170	220	390
2009	EUROPEAN JUNIOR CHAMPIONSHIPS	2	+105 kg	122.30	171	215	386
2009	35th MEN's and 15th WOMEN's JUNIOR WORLD CHAMPIONSHIPS	---	+105 kg	121.81	---	211	0
2009	European Championships	6	+105 kg	116.52	175	220	395
2008	34th MEN's and 14th WOMEN's JUNIOR WORLD CHAMPIONSHIPS	7	+105 kg	111.04	163	202	365
2008	EUROPEAN CHAMPIONSHIPS	12	105 kg	104.56	153	187	340
2007	33rd MEN's and 13th WOMEN's JUNIOR WORLD CHAMPIONSHIPS	3	+105 kg	105.73	155	191	346
2006	32nd MEN's and 12th WOMEN's JUNIOR WORLD CHAMPIONSHIPS	6	105 kg	104.36	145	175	320.0

== Personal Records ==
Snatch: 187 kg in competition / 195 kg in training

Clean & Jerk: 245 kg in competition / 243 kg in training

Front Squat: 290 kg

Back Squat: 340 kg

Deadlift: Snatch Grip 250 kg, Clean Grip 300 kg

Push Press: 181 kg x2
