= Irina Lepșa =

Romanian weightlifter (born 1992)

Personal information
- Full name: Irina Lăcrămioara Lepșa
- Born: 6 June 1992 (age 34)
- Weight: 58 kg (128 lb)

Sport
- Country: Romania
- Sport: Weightlifting
- Club: CS Olimpia București
Medal record
European Championships
Silver medal – second place	2013 Tirana	– 63 kg
Silver medal – second place	2015 Tbilisi	– 58 kg
Silver medal – second place	2016 Førde	– 58 kg
Silver medal – second place	2018 Bucharest	–63 kg
Silver medal – second place	2019 Batumi	–64 kg
Under-23 European Championships
Bronze medal – third place	2013 Tallinn	– 63 kg
European Junior Championships
Gold medal – first place	2011 Bucharest	– 63 kg
Silver medal – second place	2012 Eilat	– 63 kg

Irina Lăcrămioara Lepșa (born 6 June 1992) is a Romanian weightlifter.
