= Valentin Hristov (weightlifter, born 1994) =

Azerbaijani weightlifter

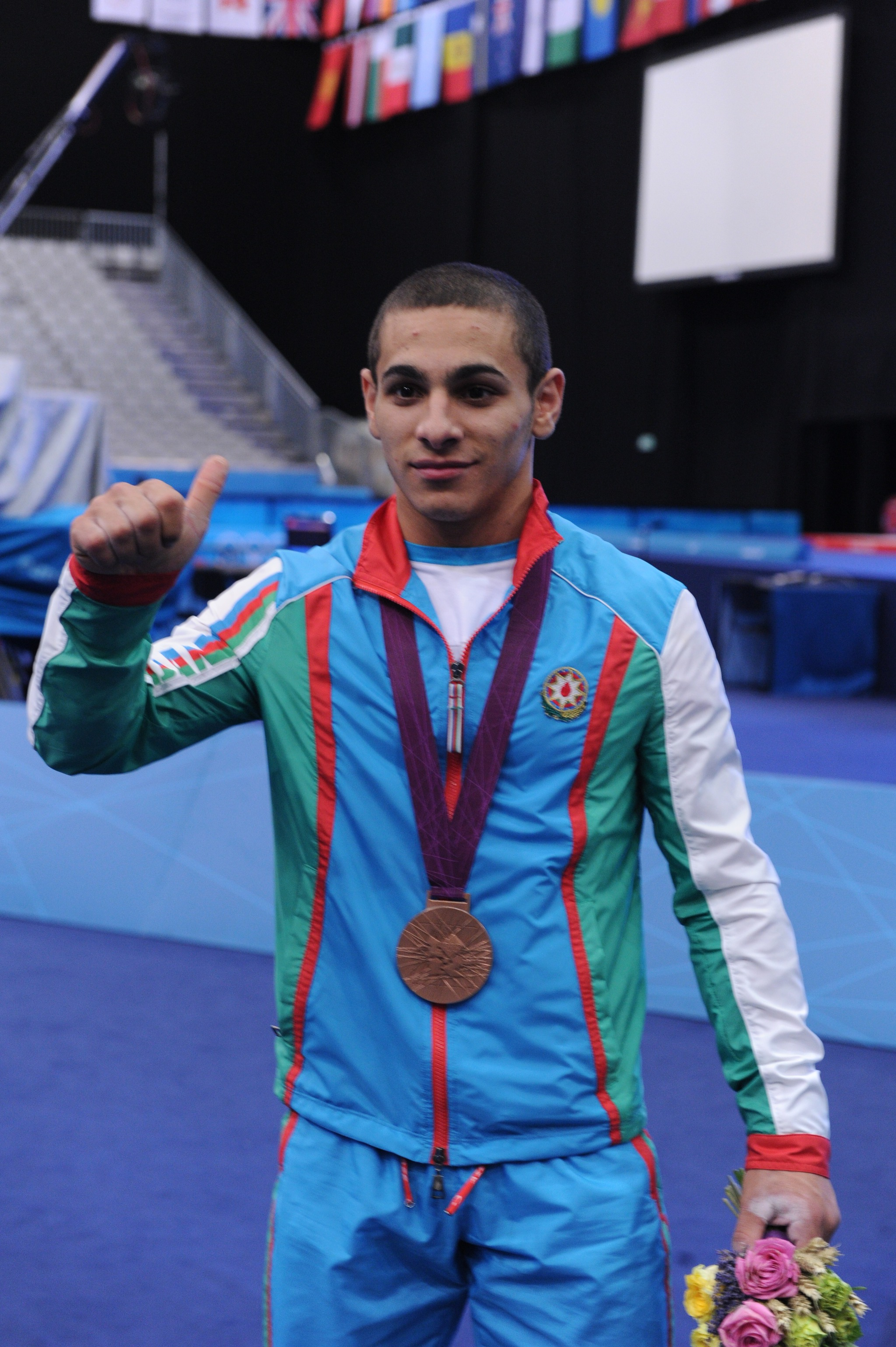

Personal information
- Nationality: Bulgarian / Azerbaijani
- Born: 30 March 1994 (age 32) Shumen, Bulgaria
- Height: 1.56 m (5 ft 1 1/2 in)
- Weight: 62 kg (137 lb)

Sport
- Country: Azerbaijan
- Sport: Weightlifting
- Event: 62 kg
- Coached by: Zlatan Vanev
Medal record
Representing Azerbaijan
Men's weightlifting
Summer Olympics
Disqualified	2012 London	-56 kg
World Championships
Bronze medal – third place	2011 Paris	-56 kg
Disqualified	2015 Houston	-62 kg
European Championships
Gold medal – first place	2012 Antalya	-56 kg
Disqualified	2013 Tirana	-62 kg
Gold medal – first place	2015 Tbilisi	-62 kg

Valentin Hristov (Bulgarian: Валентин Христов, Azerbaijani: Valentin Xristov, born 30 March 1994) is a Bulgarian naturalized Azerbaijani weightlifter. He was initially awarded and subsequently stripped of a bronze medal at the 2012 Summer Olympics, which would have been Azerbaijan's first-ever Olympic medal in this discipline.

Hristov's personal trainer is Zlatan Vanev. He has been competing for Azerbaijan since 2011.

== Doping ==
As a result of a positive drug test for Dehydromethyltestosterone (turinabol), he was disqualified from the 2013 European Championships and had received a two-year ban starting from 9 April 2013 till 9 April 2015. Four other athletes from the Azerbaijani team also tested positive and as a result the federation has been forced to pay a fine of $500,000.

At the 2015 World Weightlifting Championships he was caught using Nandrolone, he was the original bronze medalist but has since had his results disqualified. He is banned from 14 December 2015 to 14 December 2023, this being a longer suspension due to it being his second offense. He was among six other athletes from the Azerbaijani team that tested positive.

On 22 December 2018, it was announced that as a consequence of the International Olympic Committee's re-analysis program in connection with the 2012 London Olympic Games Hristov had tested positive for performance-enhancing drugs.

In March 2019 he was disqualified from the 2012 Summer Olympics after the re-analysis of his samples, and was stripped of the bronze medal. Hristov tested positive for oralturinabol.
