= Ayşegül Çoban =

Turkish weightlifter (born 1992)

Personal information
- Nationality: Turkish
- Born: 16 December 1992 (age 33) Konya, Turkey
- Height: 1.55 m (5 ft 1 in)
- Weight: 53 kg (117 lb)

Sport
- Country: Turkey
- Sport: Weightlifting
- Event: –53 kg
- Club: Konya Kuyulusebil Spor Kulübü
- Turned pro: 2010
- Coached by: Talat Ünlü

Achievements and titles
- Personal bests: Snatch: 81 kg (2014); Clean & Jerk: 114 kg (2014); Total: 195 kg (2014)
Medal record
Weightlifting
Representing Turkey
European Championships
Gold medal – first place	2014 Tel Aviv	– 53 kg
Bronze medal – third place	2011 Kazan	– 53 kg
Summer Universiade
Bronze medal – third place	2013 Kazan	– 53 kg

Ayşegül Çoban (born 16 December 1992) is a Turkish weightlifter competing in the – 53 kg division. She is a native of Konya.

== Personal life ==
Ayşegül was born on 16 December 1992 to Ali and Döndü Çoban. Due to the family's limited economic situation, Çoban was enrolled in a foster boarding school to receive a better education.

In the school, she showed interest in weightlifting, and began with exercise promoted by her teacher of physical education, Sibel Ünlü, wife of the Turkey national weightlifting team's head coach Talat Ünlü.

She lives in the Aydınlıkevler neighborhood of the Selçuklu district in Konya Province with her parents. Çoban studies at the School of Physical Education and Sports of the Selçuk University in Konya.

== Career ==
Ayşegül Çoban was admitted to the national team in 2007. She became 15-times national champion. In 2007, she broke the national record lifting 86 kg in the clean and jerk discipline in her age category.

In 2007, she won the silver medal at the European Youth U17 Championship in Pavia, Italy, and captured the gold medal at the 2008 European Youth Championship in Amiens, France. She repeated her success as champion next year at the 2009 European Youth Championships in Eilat, Israel.

In 2009, Çoban became champion at the European Junior Championship held in Landskrona, Sweden. In 2010, she was again European junior champion in Limassol, Cyprus. At the 2012 European Junior Championships held in Eilat, Israel, she gained the bronze medal.

Ayşegül Çoban won the bronze medal at the 2011 European Weightlifting Championships held in Kazan, Russia. At the 2013 European Weightlifting Championships held in Tirana, Albania, Çoban reached to silver medal in the clean&jerk discipline of the -53 kg event that sufficed only to a fourth rank in total. At the 2013 Summer Universiade in Kazan, Russia, she won the bronze medal in the -53 kg division.

Ayşegül Coban achieved first place in the women's 53 kg class at the 17th Mediterranean Games in Mersin, Turkey, on 20 June 2013, with 82 kg Snatch, 110 Clean and Jerk, with 192 kg total.

On 16 October 2013, Ayşegül Coban competed in the 53 kg women's class at the 2013 IWF World Championships in Wroclaw, Poland. She successfully lifted 77 kg in the Snatch, but did not achieve a successful lift in the Clean and Jerk.

== Achievements ==
European Youth U17 Championships

Rank	Discipline	Snatch	Clean&Jerk	Total	Place	Date
Silver	44 kg	56.0	72.0	128.0	Pavia, ITA	28 July 2007
Gold	47 kg	62.0	87.0	149.0	Ameins, FRA	21 July 2008
Gold	53 kg	73.0	95.0	168.0	Eilat, ISR	7 September 2009

European Junior Championships

Rank	Discipline	Snatch	Clean&Jerk	Total	Place	Date
Gold	53 kg	73.0	100.0	173.0	Landskrona, SWE	28 July 2009
Gold	53 kg	78.0	105.0	183.0	Limassol, CYP	11 November 2010
Bronze	53 kg	75.0	103.0	178.0	Eilat, ISR	29 December 2012

European Championships

Rank	Discipline	Snatch	Clean&Jerk	Total	Place	Date
Gold	53 kg	81.0	114.0	195.0	Tel Aviv, ISR	6 April 2014
Bronze	53 kg	75.0	105.0	180.0	Kazan, RUS	11 April 2013
4th	53 kg	80.0	105.0	185.0	Tirana, ALB	6 April 2011

Summer Universiade

Rank	Discipline	Snatch	Clean&Jerk	Total	Place	Date
Bronze	53 kg	79.0	110.0	189.0	Kazan, RUS	7 July 2013

Mediterranean Games

Rank	Discipline	Snatch	Clean&Jerk	Total	Place	Date
Silver	53 kg	82.0			Mersin, TUR	June 2013
Gold	53 kg		110.0		Mersin, TUR	June 2013
