= Genny Pagliaro =

Italian weightlifter (born 1988)

Personal information
- Full name: Genny Caterina Pagliaro
- Nationality: Italy
- Born: 15 October 1988 (age 37) Rovereto, Trentino, Italy
- Height: 1.41 m (4 ft 7 1/2 in)
- Weight: 48 kg (106 lb)

Sport
- Sport: Weightlifting
- Event: 48 kg
- Club: Centro Sportivo Esercito
- Coached by: Giuseppe Minissale
Medal record
Women's weightlifting
Representing Italy
European Championships
Gold medal – first place	2013 Tirana	48 kg
Gold medal – first place	2014 Tel Aviv	48 kg
Silver medal – second place	2016 Førde	48 kg
Bronze medal – third place	2006 Władysławowo	48 kg
Bronze medal – third place	2007 Strasbourg	48 kg
Bronze medal – third place	2009 Bucharest	48 kg
Bronze medal – third place	2011 Kazan	48 kg
Bronze medal – third place	2015 Tbilisi	48 kg

Genny Caterina Pagliaro (born 15 October 1988) is an Italian weightlifter.

Genny is the sister of the other Italian weightlifting champion Alessandra Pagliaro.

== Biography ==
She won four bronze medals for the 48 kg division at the European Weightlifting Championships (2006, 2007, 2009, and 2011). Pagliaro is a member of the weightlifting team for Centro Sportivo Esercito, and is coached and trained by Giuseppe Minissale.

Pagliaro represented Italy at the 2008 Summer Olympics in Beijing, where she competed for the women's flyweight category (48 kg). Pagliaro, however, did not finish the event, after failing to lift a single-motion snatch of 82 kg in three attempts.
