= Daniel Godelli =

Albanian weightlifter (born 1992)

Personal information
- Born: 10 January 1992 (age 34) Peqin, Albania
Medal record
Men's Weightlifting
Representing Albania
World Championships
Disqualified	2014 Almaty	77 kg
World Junior Championships
Gold medal – first place	2011 Penang	69 kg
European Championships
Silver medal – second place	2013 Tirana	69 kg
Silver medal – second place	2014 Tel Aviv	77 kg
Bronze medal – third place	2011 Kazan	69 kg
Mediterranean Games
Gold medal – first place	2013 Mersin	69 kg Snatch
Gold medal – first place	2013 Mersin	69 kg Clean&Jerk

Daniel Godelli (born 10 January 1992, in Peqin) is an Albanian weightlifter, and Olympian competing in the 69 kg and 77 kg categories until 2018 and 81 kg starting in 2018 after the International Weightlifting Federation reorganized the categories.

He has won various medals, most notably the gold medal at the 2014 World Championship in Almaty, but his results at Almaty were later disqualified due to testing positive for doping. He lifted a total weight of 369kg and became Albania's first ever to win a World championship medal in any Olympic sport. He also attempted a world record in clean and jerk but failed at 211 kg.

== Career ==
The notable achievement during Godelli's youth activities was winning the gold medal on the World Junior Championships in 2011. In this year, also he won bronze medal at 2011 European Weightlifting Championships in Kazan.

In 2013, he won a gold medal in the clean and jerk, in the men's 69 kg category in the 2013 European Weightlifting Championships in Tirana, Albania. He also won two more silver in snatch, and total.

In 2014, he repeated himself with a silver medal but in the 77 kg category, and lost the gold medal to Erkand Qerimaj only for a slightly heavier body weight, as he had lifted the same combined weight as Qerimaj, 349 kg.

He initially won a gold medal at the 2014 World Weightlifting Championships in the 77 kg category, and in doing so became Albania's first World Champion. The results were later disqualified as Godelli failed an anti-doping test for the steroid Stanozolol, as a result he was banned from competition until 10 December 2016.

== Major results ==
Year	Venue	Weight	Snatch (kg)				Clean & Jerk (kg)				Total	Rank
Year	Venue	Weight	1	2	3	Rank	1	2	3	Rank	Total	Rank
World Championships
2010	Antalya, Turkey	69 kg	135	140	~~145~~	13	167	172	177	5	317	7
2011	Paris, France	69 kg	140	143	146	6	165	–	–	32	311	20
2013	Wrocław, Poland	69 kg	~~145~~	147	~~151~~	4	~~175~~	175	~~182~~	7	322	7
2014	Almaty, Kazakhstan	77 kg	163	167	171	–	195	198	~~211~~	–	–	DSQ
2018	Ashgabat, Turkmenistan	81 kg	156	~~162~~	~~162~~	10	~~186~~	~~186~~	~~186~~	–	–	–
