= 2013 European Weightlifting Championships =

Weightlifting competition

- Location: Tirana, Albania
- Dates: 3–13 April

The 2013 European Weightlifting Championships were held in Tirana, Albania from 8 April to 14 April 2013.

== Medals tables ==
Ranking by all medals: "Big" (Total result) and "Small" (Snatch and Clean&Jerk)

Rank	Nation	Gold	Silver	Bronze	Total
1	Russia (RUS)	22	7	4	33
2	Ukraine (UKR)	4	6	2	12
3	Belarus (BLR)	4	2	2	8
4	Moldova (MDA)	4	2	1	7
5	Bulgaria (BUL)	3	6	5	14
6	Italy (ITA)	3	0	1	4
7	Romania (ROU)	2	9	2	13
8	Poland (POL)	2	1	10	13
9	Albania (ALB)	1	3	2	6
10	Spain (ESP)	0	3	2	5
11	Lithuania (LTU)	0	3	0	3
12	France (FRA)	0	1	5	6
13	Latvia (LAT)	0	1	1	2
14	Turkey (TUR)	0	1	0	1
15	Hungary (HUN)	0	0	3	3
16	Belgium (BEL)	0	0	2	2
16	Czech Republic (CZE)	0	0	2	2
18	Georgia (GEO)	0	0	1	1
Totals (18 entries)		45	45	45	135

Ranking by "Big" (Total result) medals

Rank	Nation	Gold	Silver	Bronze	Total
1	Russia (RUS)	8	2	1	11
2	Bulgaria (BUL)	1	3	1	5
3	Romania (ROU)	1	3	0	4
4	Ukraine (UKR)	1	2	2	5
5	Belarus (BLR)	1	1	1	3
6	Poland (POL)	1	0	3	4
7	Moldova (MDA)	1	0	1	2
8	Italy (ITA)	1	0	0	1
9	Albania (ALB)	0	1	1	2
10	Lithuania (LTU)	0	1	0	1
10	Spain (ESP)	0	1	0	1
12	France (FRA)	0	0	2	2
13	Belgium (BEL)	0	0	1	1
13	Czech Republic (CZE)	0	0	1	1
13	Hungary (HUN)	0	0	1	1
13	Latvia (LAT)	0	0	1	1
Totals (16 entries)		15	14	16	45

== Schedule ==
The competition days were split in A and B groups.

Date	Time	Round
8 April 2013	11:30	Women's 48 kg Group B
8 April 2013	14:00	Men's 56 kg Group B
8 April 2013	16:30	Opening ceremony
8 April 2013	17:30	Women's 48 kg Group A
8 April 2013	20:00	Men's 56 kg Group A
9 April 2013	11:30	Women's 53 kg Group B
9 April 2013	15:00	Men's 62 kg Group B
9 April 2013	17:30	Women's 53 kg Group A
9 April 2013	20:00	Men's 62 kg Group A
10 April 2013	11:30	Women's 58 kg Group B
10 April 2013	15:00	Men's 69 kg Group B
10 April 2013	17:30	Women's 58 kg Group A
10 April 2013	20:00	Men's 69 kg Group A
11 April 2013	11:30	Women's 63 kg Group B
11 April 2013	15:00	Men's 77 kg Group B
11 April 2013	17:30	Women's 63 kg Group A
11 April 2013	20:00	Men's 77 kg Group A

Date	Time	Round
12 April 2013	10:00	Women's 69 kg Group B
12 April 2013	11:45	Men's 94 kg Group B
12 April 2013	14:30	Men's 85 kg Group B
12 April 2013	17:30	Women's 69 kg Group A
12 April 2013	20:00	Men's 85 kg Group A
13 April 2013	10:00	Women's 75 kg/+ 75 kg Group B
13 April 2013	11:30	Men's 105 kg Group B
13 April 2013	14:30	Women's 75 kg Group A
13 April 2013	17:30	Men's 94 kg Group A
13 April 2013	20:00	Men's 105 kg Group A
14 April 2013	10:00	Men's + 105 kg Group B
14 April 2013	13:00	Women's + 75 kg Group A
14 April 2013	15:30	Men's + 105 kg Group A

== Medal overview ==
=== Men ===
Event		Gold		Silver		Bronze	
– 56 kg	Snatch	Asen Muradov (BUL)	118 kg	Oleg Sîrghi (MDA)	116 kg	Tom Goegebuer (BEL)	113 kg
– 56 kg	Clean & Jerk	Oleg Sîrghi (MDA)	145 kg	Asen Muradov (BUL)	140 kg	Mirco Scarantino (ITA)	135 kg
– 56 kg	Total	Oleg Sîrghi (MDA)	261 kg	Asen Muradov (BUL)	258 kg	Tom Goegebuer (BEL)	248 kg
– 62 kg	Snatch	Florin Croitoru (ROU)	135 kg	Ferdi Nazif (BUL)	126 kg	Ghenadie Dudoglo (MDA)	125 kg
– 62 kg	Clean & Jerk	Florin Croitoru (ROU)	155 kg	Stoyan Enev (BUL)	155 kg	Arthouros Akriditis (GRE)	150 kg
– 62 kg	Total	Florin Croitoru (ROU)	290 kg	Stoyan Enev (BUL)	278 kg	Ghenadie Dudoglo (MDA)	275 kg
– 69 kg	Snatch	Oleg Chen (RUS)	155 kg	Daniel Godelli (ALB)	145 kg	Bernardin Ledoux Kingue Matam (FRA)	143 kg
– 69 kg	Clean & Jerk	Daniel Godelli (ALB)	180 kg	Oleg Chen (RUS)	176 kg	Bernardin Ledoux Kingue Matam (FRA)	168 kg
– 69 kg	Total	Oleg Chen (RUS)	331 kg	Daniel Godelli (ALB)	325 kg	Bernardin Ledoux Kingue Matam (FRA)	311 kg
– 77 kg	Snatch	Dmitrii Khomiakov (RUS)	161 kg	Paul Stoichiță (ROU)	148 kg	Damian Lukasz Kucynski (POL)	145 kg
– 77 kg	Clean & Jerk	Dmitrii Khomiakov (RUS)	190 kg	Paul Stoichiță (ROU)	186 kg	Damian Lukasz Kucynski (POL)	185 kg
– 77 kg	Total	Dmitrii Khomiakov (RUS)	351 kg	Paul Stoichiță (ROU)	334 kg	Damian Lukasz Kucynski (POL)	330 kg
– 85 kg	Snatch	Apti Aukhadov (RUS)	173 kg	Ivan Markov (BUL)	170 kg	Gabriel Sîncrăian (ROU)	166 kg
– 85 kg	Clean & Jerk	Apti Aukhadov (RUS)	215 kg	Ivan Markov (BUL)	205 kg	Albert Sayakhov (RUS)	202 kg
– 85 kg	Total	Apti Aukhadov (RUS)	388 kg	Ivan Markov (BUL)	375 kg	Albert Sayakhov (RUS)	367 kg
– 94 kg	Snatch	Rinat Kireev (RUS)	173 kg	Žygimantas Stanulis (LTU)	172 kg	Andrian Zbirnea (MDA)	168 kg
– 94 kg	Clean & Jerk	Rinat Kireev (RUS)	216 kg	Žygimantas Stanulis (LTU)	200 kg	Aliaksandr Makaranka (BLR)	200 kg
– 94 kg	Total	Rinat Kireev (RUS)	389 kg	Žygimantas Stanulis (LTU)	372 kg	Aliaksandr Makaranka (BLR)	366 kg
– 105 kg	Snatch	Maxim Sheiko (RUS)	184 kg	David Bedzhanyan (RUS)	181 kg	Kornel Czekiel (POL)	177 kg
– 105 kg	Clean & Jerk	David Bedzhanyan (RUS)	230 kg	Artūrs Plēsnieks (LAT)	222 kg	Maxim Sheiko (RUS)	220 kg
– 105 kg	Total	David Bedzhanyan (RUS)	411 kg	Maxim Sheiko (RUS)	404 kg	Artūrs Plēsnieks (LAT)	397 kg
+ 105 kg	Snatch	Artem Udachyn (UKR)	200 kg	Ruslan Albegov (RUS)	195 kg	Irakli Turmanidze (GEO)	192 kg
+ 105 kg	Clean & Jerk	Ruslan Albegov (RUS)	247 kg	Artem Udachyn (UKR)	242 kg	Jiří Orság (CZE)	237 kg
+ 105 kg	Total	Ruslan Albegov (RUS)	442 kg	Artem Udachyn (UKR)	442 kg	Jiří Orság (CZE)	422 kg

=== Women ===
Event		Gold		Silver		Bronze	
– 48 kg	Snatch	Genny Pagliaro (ITA)	82 kg	Lana Diachenko (UKR)	75 kg	Estefania Juan Tello (ESP)	73 kg
– 48 kg	Clean & Jerk	Genny Pagliaro (ITA)	99 kg	Anais Michel (FRA)	92 kg	Estefania Juan Tello (ESP)	90 kg
– 48 kg	Total	Genny Pagliaro (ITA)	181 kg	Lana Diachenko (UKR)	164 kg	Anais Michel (FRA)	164 kg
– 53 kg	Snatch	Iuliia Paratova (UKR)	90 kg	Svetlana Cheremshanova (RUS)	82 kg	Manon Lorentz (FRA)	81 kg
– 53 kg	Clean & Jerk	Svetlana Cheremshanova (RUS)	106 kg	Ayşegül Çoban (TUR)	105 kg	Maya Ivanova (BUL)	105 kg
– 53 kg	Total	Iuliia Paratova (UKR)	194 kg	Svetlana Cheremshanova (RUS)	188 kg	Maya Ivanova (BUL)	186 kg
– 58 kg	Snatch	Alena Chychkan (BLR)	95 kg	Romela Begaj (ALB)	95 kg	Loredana Toma (ROU)	93 kg
– 58 kg	Clean & Jerk	Alena Chychkan (BLR)	118 kg	Loredana Toma (ROU)	117 kg	Romela Begaj (ALB)	112 kg
– 58 kg	Total	Alena Chychkan (BLR)	213 kg	Loredana Toma (ROU)	210 kg	Romela Begaj (ALB)	207 kg
– 63 kg	Snatch	Milka Maneva (BUL)	96 kg	Irina Lepșa (ROU)	90 kg	Anna Lesniewska (POL)	89 kg
– 63 kg	Clean & Jerk	Irina Lepșa (ROU)	122 kg	Milka Maneva (BUL)	121 kg	Anna Lesniewska (POL)	114 kg
– 63 kg	Total	Milka Maneva (BUL)	217 kg	Irina Lepșa (ROU)	212 kg	Anna Lesniewska (POL)	203 kg
– 69 kg	Snatch	Dzina Sazanavets (BLR)	112 kg	Oxana Slivenko (RUS)	112 kg	Nadiya Myronuk (UKR)	105 kg
– 69 kg	Clean & Jerk	Oxana Slivenko (RUS)	145 kg	Dzina Sazanavets (BLR)	140 kg	Tatiana Matveeva (RUS)	127 kg
– 69 kg	Total	Oxana Slivenko (RUS)	257 kg	Dzina Sazanavets (BLR)	252 kg	Nadiya Myronuk (UKR)	230 kg
– 75 kg	Snatch	Nadezhda Yevstyukhina (RUS)	123 kg	Lydia Valentin (ESP)	120 kg	Malgorzata Antonina Wiejak (POL)	100 kg
– 75 kg	Clean & Jerk	Nadezhda Yevstyukhina (RUS)	155 kg	Lydia Valentin (ESP)	135 kg	Malgorzata Antonina Wiejak (POL)	116 kg
– 75 kg	Total	Nadezhda Yevstyukhina (RUS)	278 kg	Lydia Valentin (ESP)	255 kg	Malgorzata Antonina Wiejak (POL)	216 kg
+ 75 kg	Snatch	Ganna Kozenko (UKR)	101 kg	Sabina Bagińska (POL)	101 kg	Krisztina Magát (HUN)	96 kg
+ 75 kg	Clean & Jerk	Sabina Bagińska (POL)	128 kg	Ganna Kozenko (UKR)	127 kg	Krisztina Magát (HUN)	124 kg
+ 75 kg	Total	Sabina Bagińska (POL)	229 kg	Ganna Kozenko (UKR)	228 kg	Krisztina Magát (HUN)	220 kg

== Doping ==
2013 European Weightlifting Championships 94 Men - Intigam Zairov DQ

== Participating countries ==
List of participating countries. In total 35 countries participated in this championships.

- Albania (10)
- Armenia (3)
- Azerbaijan (6)
- Belgium (1)
- Bosnia and Herzegovina (1)
- Belarus (6)
- Bulgaria (12)
- Croatia (3)
- Czech Republic (2)
- Denmark (1)
- Spain (7)
- Estonia (3)
- Finland (8)
- France (11)
- United Kingdom (2)
- Georgia (5)
- Germany (8)
- Greece (8)
- Hungary (5)
- Ireland (1)
- Israel (1)
- Italy (10)
- Latvia (2)
- Lithuania (1)
- Moldova (8)
- Netherlands (2)
- Norway (5)
- Poland (12)
- Romania (10)
- Russia (14)
- Switzerland (1)
- Slovakia (2)
- Sweden (3)
- Turkey (5)
- Ukraine (10)
