= Milka Maneva =

Bulgarian weightlifter (born 1985)

Medal record

Women's weightlifting

Representing Bulgaria

Olympic Games
Silver medal – second place	2012 London	– 63 kg

European Championships
Gold medal – first place	2013 Tirana	–63 kg
Silver medal – second place	2014 Tel Aviv	–69 kg

Milka Maneva (Bulgarian: Милка Манева; born 7 June 1985 in Smolyan, Bulgaria) is a Bulgarian weightlifter. She won the silver medal in the Women's 63 kg category at the 2012 Summer Olympics. She originally finished fifth, but was promoted to second after Maiya Maneza, Svetlana Tsarukayeva, and Sibel Şimşek were all disqualified.

Maneva also qualified for the 2008 Summer Olympics but she was one of eleven Bulgarian weightlifters who tested positive for a banned steroid two months prior to the games. Bulgaria withdrew its whole team from the Olympic competition and Maneva received a four-year ban.
