= 2010 World Weightlifting Championships – Men's 85 kg =

The men's competition in the light-heavyweight (– 85 kg) division was held on 23 and 24 September 2010.

== Schedule ==
Date	Time	Event
23 September 2010	08:00	Group D
23 September 2010	10:00	Group C
24 September 2010	17:00	Group B
24 September 2010	20:00	Group A

== Medalists ==
Event	Gold		Silver		Bronze	
Snatch	Ara Khachatryan (ARM)	175 kg	Adrian Zieliński (POL)	173 kg	Aleksey Yufkin (RUS)	172 kg
Clean & Jerk	Siarhei Lahun (BLR)	211 kg	Yoelmis Hernández (CUB)	210 kg	Adrian Zieliński (POL)	210 kg
Total	Adrian Zieliński (POL)	383 kg	Aleksey Yufkin (RUS)	380 kg	Siarhei Lahun (BLR)	377 kg

== Records ==
Prior to this competition, the existing world records were as follows.

World record	Snatch	Andrei Rybakou (BLR)	187 kg	Chiang Mai, Thailand	22 September 2007
World record	Clean & jerk	Zhang Yong (CHN)	218 kg	Ramat Gan, Israel	25 April 1998
World record	Total	~~Andrei Rybakou (BLR)~~; Lu Yong (CHN)	~~394 kg~~ 394 kg	~~Beijing, China~~; Beijing, China	~~15 August 2008~~; 15 August 2008

- Andrei Rybakou's world record was rescinded in 2016.

== Results ==
Rank	Athlete	Group	Body weight	Snatch (kg)				Clean & Jerk (kg)				Total
Rank	Athlete	Group	Body weight	1	2	3	Rank	1	2	3	Rank	Total
1st place, gold medalist(s)	Adrian Zieliński (POL)	A	84.55	170	~~173~~	173	2nd place, silver medalist(s)	202	206	210	3rd place, bronze medalist(s)	383
2nd place, silver medalist(s)	Aleksey Yufkin (RUS)	A	84.68	165	170	172	3rd place, bronze medalist(s)	202	208	~~212~~	4	380
3rd place, bronze medalist(s)	Siarhei Lahun (BLR)	A	83.84	~~166~~	166	~~170~~	6	203	~~211~~	211	1st place, gold medalist(s)	377
4	Yoelmis Hernández (CUB)	B	83.05	152	158	164	10	200	206	210	2nd place, silver medalist(s)	374
5	Lu Yong (CHN)	A	84.78	170	~~175~~	~~175~~	4	202	—	—	6	372
6	Mansurbek Chashemov (UZB)	A	83.99	165	169	~~172~~	5	200	~~206~~	~~206~~	9	369
7	Gabriel Sîncrăian (ROU)	A	84.90	160	165	~~170~~	9	~~195~~	195	201	7	366
8	Benjamin Hennequin (FRA)	B	84.05	157	161	163	11	197	202	~~208~~	5	365
9	Kim Kwang-hoon (KOR)	A	82.61	157	~~162~~	162	12	~~200~~	200	~~210~~	8	362
10	Ruslan Nurudinov (UZB)	A	84.37	~~165~~	165	~~169~~	7	~~197~~	197	~~201~~	10	362
11	Carlos Andica (COL)	B	84.25	153	157	160	13	191	194	~~197~~	14	354
12	Ragab Abdelhay (EGY)	B	84.55	152	~~157~~	157	15	188	~~196~~	196	11	353
13	Iurii Chykyda (UKR)	B	84.81	155	~~160~~	160	14	185	~~192~~	192	16	352
14	İzzet İnce (TUR)	B	84.64	160	165	~~167~~	8	181	186	~~190~~	18	351
15	János Baranyai (HUN)	C	84.43	147	152	155	18	186	190	195	12	350
16	Ondrej Kutlík (SVK)	C	84.77	147	~~152~~	~~153~~	27	188	195	~~200~~	13	342
17	Rauli Tsirekidze (GEO)	C	83.54	150	154	156	16	~~185~~	~~185~~	185	20	341
18	Octavio Mejías (VEN)	D	84.32	145	148	151	21	182	187	190	17	341
19	Mansur Rejepow (TKM)	C	84.21	155	~~160~~	~~160~~	17	~~180~~	180	185	21	340
20	Tom Schwarzbach (GER)	B	84.73	146	~~150~~	~~150~~	29	192	~~196~~	~~196~~	15	338
21	Nailkhan Nabiyev (AZE)	C	85.00	146	152	~~155~~	20	~~186~~	186	~~191~~	19	338
22	Kostyantyn Selivanov (UKR)	C	84.73	~~146~~	146	150	23	185	~~190~~	~~192~~	22	335
23	Marius Mickevičius (LTU)	C	84.90	~~150~~	~~150~~	153	19	176	~~181~~	181	25	334
24	Pitaya Tibnoke (THA)	C	84.74	148	~~152~~	~~152~~	25	185	~~190~~	~~190~~	23	333
25	Matt Bruce (USA)	C	84.80	~~142~~	145	150	24	180	~~186~~	~~186~~	27	330
26	Konstantinos Papadopoulos (GRE)	C	84.74	146	~~150~~	~~150~~	30	175	180	182	24	328
27	Alexandru Satalenco (MDA)	C	84.56	146	~~151~~	~~151~~	28	~~180~~	~~180~~	180	26	326
28	Yerbol Meirmanov (KAZ)	D	83.69	140	145	150	22	170	175	~~180~~	28	325
29	Mathieu Marineau (CAN)	D	84.84	140	145	~~147~~	32	~~175~~	~~175~~	175	29	320
30	Kubanychbek Toktonaliev (KGZ)	D	84.95	145	~~150~~	~~150~~	33	~~173~~	174	~~181~~	30	319
31	Paul Dumais (CAN)	D	84.16	~~140~~	140	145	31	170	~~174~~	~~174~~	31	315
32	Alex Alayan (URU)	D	84.78	117	122	125	34	144	~~150~~	150	32	275
—	Ara Khachatryan (ARM)	A	83.05	170	~~175~~	175	1st place, gold medalist(s)	~~201~~	—	—	—	—
—	Jasurbek Jumaýew (TKM)	C	84.64	147	~~153~~	~~153~~	26	~~175~~	~~175~~	~~176~~	—	—
—	Vladimir Kuznetsov (KAZ)	A	84.38	~~160~~	~~160~~	~~160~~	—	—	—	—	—	—
—	Tigran Martirosyan (ARM)	A	84.23	~~170~~	~~170~~	~~170~~	—	—	—	—	—	—
—	Kendrick Farris (USA)	B	83.89	~~150~~	~~150~~	~~150~~	—	—	—	—	—	—
—	Raad Ameen (IRQ)	D	83.53	143	~~146~~	~~146~~	—	175	~~180~~	~~180~~	—	—
—	Abbas Al-Qaisoum (KSA)	D	84.24	135	142	~~145~~	—	165	~~174~~	~~174~~	—	—
—	Hansley Gaya (MRI)	D	85.00	100	106	~~111~~	—	135	~~147~~	~~147~~	—	—
—	Amar Musić (CRO)	B	84.67	~~156~~	~~156~~	~~158~~	—	195	~~200~~	—	—	—
