= 2007 World Weightlifting Championships – Men's 85 kg =

The men's competition in 85 kg division was staged on September 21–22, 2007.

== Schedule ==
Date	Time	Event
21 September 2007	12:00	Group D
21 September 2007	20:00	Group C
22 September 2007	14:30	Group B
22 September 2007	17:00	Group A

== Medalists ==
Event	Gold		Silver		Bronze	
Snatch	Andrei Rybakou (BLR)	187 kg	Aslanbek Ediev (RUS)	172 kg	Georgi Markov (BUL)	172 kg
Clean & Jerk	Andrei Rybakou (BLR)	206 kg	José Oliver Ruiz (COL)	205 kg	Jadier Valladares (CUB)	201 kg
Total	Andrei Rybakou (BLR)	393 kg	Aslanbek Ediev (RUS)	372 kg	Vadzim Straltsou (BLR)	370 kg

== Records ==
Prior to this competition, the existing world records were as follows.

World Record	Snatch	Andrei Rybakou (BLR)	186 kg	Władysławowo, Poland	6 May 2006
World Record	Clean & Jerk	Zhang Yong (CHN)	218 kg	Ramat Gan, Israel	25 April 1998
World Record	Total	World Standard	395 kg	—	1 January 1998

== Results ==
Rank	Athlete	Group	Body weight	Snatch (kg)				Clean & Jerk (kg)				Total
Rank	Athlete	Group	Body weight	1	2	3	Rank	1	2	3	Rank	Total
1st place, gold medalist(s)	Andrei Rybakou (BLR)	A	84.70	180	185	187	1st place, gold medalist(s)	200	206	~~209~~	1st place, gold medalist(s)	393
2nd place, silver medalist(s)	Aslanbek Ediev (RUS)	A	84.18	168	~~172~~	172	2nd place, silver medalist(s)	200	~~205~~	~~205~~	4	372
3rd place, bronze medalist(s)	Vadzim Straltsou (BLR)	A	84.29	165	~~170~~	170	4	195	200	~~205~~	6	370
4	Roman Khamatshin (RUS)	A	84.20	160	165	~~166~~	7	200	~~208~~	~~208~~	5	365
5	Georgi Markov (BUL)	A	84.40	168	172	~~174~~	3rd place, bronze medalist(s)	193	~~201~~	~~202~~	12	365
6	Lu Yong (CHN)	A	84.09	168	~~173~~	~~173~~	5	195	~~203~~	~~205~~	8	363
7	Mansurbek Chashemov (UZB)	A	84.10	~~166~~	168	~~172~~	6	195	~~200~~	~~202~~	9	363
8	Jadier Valladares (CUB)	B	84.31	154	160	162	10	193	198	201	3rd place, bronze medalist(s)	363
9	José Oliver Ruiz (COL)	B	84.69	155	~~160~~	~~160~~	22	197	202	205	2nd place, silver medalist(s)	360
10	Tigran Martirosyan (ARM)	B	82.47	155	160	164	9	187	~~192~~	192	13	356
11	İzzet İnce (TUR)	A	84.70	165	~~171~~	~~171~~	8	~~190~~	190	~~196~~	17	355
12	Viktor Mitrou (GRE)	B	82.70	157	~~162~~	~~162~~	17	190	~~195~~	195	7	352
13	Carlos Andica (COL)	C	84.62	152	156	158	16	186	190	194	11	352
14	Oleksandr Lagodniy (UKR)	B	84.76	153	157	160	14	192	~~196~~	~~196~~	14	352
15	Michael Böhm (GER)	C	84.27	152	157	161	11	185	~~190~~	190	16	351
16	Gevorik Poghosyan (ARM)	B	84.74	155	~~160~~	160	13	188	~~193~~	~~193~~	21	348
17	David Matam (FRA)	C	84.43	~~153~~	153	157	19	180	186	189	18	346
18	Ulanbek Moldodosov (KGZ)	D	82.74	150	157	~~160~~	18	180	187	188	19	345
19	Sebastian Pawlikowski (POL)	B	84.52	157	~~161~~	~~161~~	20	188	—	—	20	345
20	Mansur Rejepow (TKM)	C	84.31	152	158	~~160~~	15	180	185	~~188~~	22	343
21	Harem Taha (IRQ)	B	82.69	150	~~157~~	~~157~~	29	190	—	—	15	340
22	Rauli Tsirekidze (GEO)	C	84.24	150	154	~~157~~	23	183	~~189~~	~~189~~	26	337
23	Ondrej Kutlík (SVK)	C	84.58	145	~~152~~	152	24	185	~~190~~	~~195~~	24	337
24	Benjamin Hennequin (FRA)	B	84.73	~~152~~	152	~~157~~	25	185	~~190~~	~~190~~	25	337
25	Adriano Méndez (ESP)	C	84.57	145	150	~~155~~	32	~~185~~	185	~~190~~	23	335
26	Richard Tkáč (SVK)	C	84.58	147	153	156	21	170	175	~~180~~	32	331
27	Intigam Zairov (AZE)	C	82.21	~~150~~	150	~~155~~	27	175	180	~~184~~	27	330
28	Norbert Cser (HUN)	C	82.61	~~150~~	~~150~~	150	28	180	~~187~~	~~187~~	28	330
29	Deniss Žuļins (LAT)	C	84.45	~~145~~	145	150	30	175	~~180~~	180	30	330
30	Shahrouz Ghorbani (IRI)	C	84.55	~~150~~	150	~~156~~	31	180	~~188~~	~~190~~	31	330
31	Vitālijs Kovtuns (LAT)	D	84.01	~~139~~	139	142	34	~~174~~	174	180	29	322
32	Mohammad Sarlak (IRI)	C	84.63	~~140~~	140	~~151~~	35	175	~~183~~	~~183~~	33	315
33	Rahman Hidayat (INA)	D	80.52	137	~~142~~	~~145~~	36	170	~~175~~	~~175~~	34	307
34	Darryn Anthony (RSA)	D	79.79	~~135~~	135	~~142~~	38	~~165~~	~~165~~	165	35	300
35	Brice Batchaya (CMR)	D	82.95	~~135~~	~~135~~	135	39	~~165~~	165	~~170~~	36	300
36	Serge Tremblay (CAN)	D	84.71	130	135	~~140~~	40	~~163~~	~~163~~	163	38	298
37	David Katoatau (KIR)	D	84.39	118	~~125~~	~~125~~	41	157	~~163~~	163	37	281
—	Giorgi Asanidze (GEO)	B	84.51	160	~~164~~	~~164~~	12	~~187~~	~~187~~	~~187~~	—	—
—	Kendrick Farris (USA)	B	84.82	152	~~156~~	~~156~~	26	~~190~~	~~190~~	~~190~~	—	—
—	Kheela Inderjit Singh (GBR)	D	80.72	140	145	~~148~~	33	—	—	—	—	—
—	Zoltán Gráner (HUN)	D	84.27	137	~~142~~	~~142~~	37	~~168~~	~~168~~	~~168~~	—	—
—	Karol Gorczyczewski (POL)	B	84.26	~~155~~	~~155~~	~~155~~	—	~~195~~	195	~~200~~	10	—
—	Erdal Sunar (TUR)	B	84.95	~~160~~	~~160~~	~~160~~	—	—	—	—	—	—
DQ	Valeriu Calancea (ROU)	A	84.62	160	~~165~~	166	—	201	~~207~~	~~207~~	—	—
DQ	Vyacheslav Yershov (KAZ)	A	83.27	170	~~175~~	~~175~~	—	190	~~195~~	~~196~~	—	—

== New records ==
Snatch	187 kg	Andrei Rybakou (BLR)	WR
