= Weightlifting at the 2010 Asian Games – Men's 85 kg =

Men's 85 kg at the 2010 Asian Games
- Venue: Dongguan Arena
- Date: 17 November 2010
- Competitors: 13 from 11 nations

Medalists
gold medal	Lu Yong	China
silver medal	Mansurbek Chashemov	Uzbekistan
bronze medal	Kim Kwang-hoon	South Korea

The men's 85 kilograms event at the 2010 Asian Games took place on 17 November 2010 at Dongguan Arena.

== Schedule ==
All times are China Standard Time (UTC+08:00)

Date	Time	Event
Wednesday, 17 November 2010	12:30	Group B
Wednesday, 17 November 2010	16:30	Group A

== Records ==
Prior to this competition, the existing world, Asian and Games records were as follows.

World Record	Snatch	Andrei Rybakou (BLR)	187 kg	Chiang Mai, Thailand	22 September 2007
World Record	Clean & Jerk	Zhang Yong (CHN)	218 kg	Ramat Gan, Israel	25 April 1998
World Record	Total	~~Andrei Rybakou (BLR)~~; Lu Yong (CHN)	~~394 kg~~ 394 kg	~~Beijing, China~~; Beijing, China	~~15 August 2008~~; 15 August 2008
Asian Record	Snatch	Lu Yong (CHN)	180 kg	Beijing, China	15 August 2008
Asian Record	Clean & Jerk	Zhang Yong (CHN)	218 kg	Ramat Gan, Israel	25 April 1998
Asian Record	Total	Lu Yong (CHN)	394 kg	Beijing, China	15 August 2008
Games Record	Snatch	Vyacheslav Yershov (KAZ)	175 kg	Doha, Qatar	5 December 2006
Games Record	Clean & Jerk	Shahin Nassirinia (IRI)	210 kg	Bangkok, Thailand	11 December 1998
Games Record	Total	Shahin Nassirinia (IRI)	380 kg	Bangkok, Thailand	11 December 1998

- Andrei Rybakou's world record was rescinded in 2016.

== Results ==
Legend

- NM — No mark

Rank	Athlete	Group	Body weight	Snatch (kg)				Clean & Jerk (kg)				Total
Rank	Athlete	Group	Body weight	1	2	3	Result	1	2	3	Result	Total
1st place, gold medalist(s)	Lu Yong (CHN)	A	84.80	~~170~~	170	173	173	201	203	—	203	376
2nd place, silver medalist(s)	Mansurbek Chashemov (UZB)	A	83.27	165	169	172	172	200	~~202~~	~~202~~	200	372
3rd place, bronze medalist(s)	Kim Kwang-hoon (KOR)	A	82.83	~~155~~	155	160	160	195	209	~~216~~	209	369
4	Jiang Hairong (CHN)	A	84.06	167	~~172~~	~~172~~	167	~~202~~	202	~~209~~	202	369
5	Vladimir Kuznetsov (KAZ)	A	84.36	160	165	167	167	~~200~~	~~200~~	201	201	368
6	Kianoush Rostami (IRI)	A	84.67	159	162	165	165	200	~~205~~	~~205~~	200	365
7	Abbas Al-Qaisoum (KSA)	B	84.53	144	148	150	150	175	~~180~~	180	180	330
8	Mansur Rejepow (TKM)	B	83.72	150	~~155~~	~~155~~	150	170	176	~~181~~	176	326
9	Meýlis Gülalyýew (TKM)	B	83.74	144	~~148~~	149	149	170	176	~~181~~	176	325
10	Chandrakant Mali (IND)	B	84.77	138	~~144~~	~~145~~	138	~~171~~	~~171~~	171	171	309
11	Yousef Yaqoub (IOC)	B	84.77	115	120	—	120	160	—	—	160	280
12	Mustafa Karmand (AFG)	B	80.49	95	105	~~110~~	105	120	130	~~135~~	130	235
—	Pitaya Tibnoke (THA)	B	84.36	~~145~~	~~145~~	~~145~~	—	—	—	—	—	NM
