= Weightlifting at the 2006 Asian Games – Men's 85 kg =

Men's 85 kg at the 2006 Asian Games
- Venue: Al-Dana Banquet Hall
- Date: 5 December 2006
- Competitors: 16 from 14 nations

Medalists
gold medal	Vyacheslav Yershov	Kazakhstan
silver medal	Lu Yong	China
bronze medal	Kim Seon-jong	South Korea

The men's 85 kilograms event at the 2006 Asian Games took place on December 5, 2006 at Al-Dana Banquet Hall in Doha.

== Schedule ==
All times are Arabia Standard Time (UTC+03:00)

Date	Time	Event
Tuesday, 5 December 2006	10:00	Group B
Tuesday, 5 December 2006	16:00	Group A

== Records ==
Prior to this competition, the existing world, Asian and Games records were as follows.

World Record	Snatch	Andrei Rybakou (BLR)	186 kg	Władysławowo, Poland	6 May 2006
World Record	Clean & Jerk	Zhang Yong (CHN)	218 kg	Ramat Gan, Israel	25 April 1998
World Record	Total	World Standard	395 kg	—	1 January 1998
Asian Record	Snatch	Shahin Nassirinia (IRI)	175 kg	Athens, Greece	26 November 1999
Asian Record	Clean & Jerk	Zhang Yong (CHN)	218 kg	Ramat Gan, Israel	25 April 1998
Asian Record	Total	Shahin Nassirinia (IRI)	390 kg	Athens, Greece	26 November 1999
Games Record	Snatch	Shahin Nassirinia (IRI)	170 kg	Bangkok, Thailand	11 December 1998
Games Record	Clean & Jerk	Shahin Nassirinia (IRI)	210 kg	Bangkok, Thailand	11 December 1998
Games Record	Total	Shahin Nassirinia (IRI)	380 kg	Bangkok, Thailand	11 December 1998

== Results ==
Legend

- NM — No mark

Rank	Athlete	Group	Body weight	Snatch (kg)				Clean & Jerk (kg)				Total
Rank	Athlete	Group	Body weight	1	2	3	Result	1	2	3	Result	Total
1st place, gold medalist(s)	Vyacheslav Yershov (KAZ)	A	83.67	170	~~175~~	175	175	195	202	—	202	377
2nd place, silver medalist(s)	Lu Yong (CHN)	A	84.32	162	167	~~170~~	167	195	202	~~211~~	202	369
3rd place, bronze medalist(s)	Kim Seon-jong (KOR)	A	84.85	150	155	~~160~~	155	186	191	200	200	355
4	Ulanbek Moldodosov (KGZ)	A	82.63	150	~~155~~	~~155~~	150	182	190	~~196~~	190	340
5	Salamat Nurullaev (UZB)	A	82.48	140	~~145~~	145	145	180	185	190	190	335
6	Shujauddin Malik (PAK)	A	84.78	~~145~~	145	~~150~~	145	181	188	~~196~~	188	333
7	Abbas Al-Qaisoum (KSA)	A	84.77	~~141~~	141	~~146~~	141	170	175	180	180	321
8	Mansur Rejepow (TKM)	A	82.51	145	~~150~~	~~150~~	145	165	172	~~180~~	172	317
9	Almas Uteshov (KAZ)	A	84.13	130	140	~~145~~	140	160	170	~~180~~	170	310
10	Ruslan Ramazanow (TKM)	A	84.59	135	142	~~145~~	142	165	~~175~~	~~176~~	165	307
11	Maarouf Tarha (LIB)	B	82.33	110	~~116~~	116	116	145	152	~~157~~	152	268
12	Abdulredha Yahya (BRN)	B	83.60	121	~~125~~	~~125~~	121	141	147	~~153~~	147	268
13	Durvunjingiin Chinzorig (MGL)	B	84.36	120	~~125~~	~~125~~	120	147	~~150~~	~~150~~	147	267
14	Ahmed Al-Ijla (PLE)	B	84.77	110	~~115~~	~~116~~	110	130	140	~~145~~	140	250
15	Ghanim Rashid (QAT)	B	83.40	60	~~65~~	70	70	80	85	90	90	160
—	Lưu Văn Thắng (VIE)	B	84.47	~~135~~	~~135~~	~~135~~	—	—	—	—	—	NM

== New records ==
The following records were established during the competition.

Snatch	175	Vyacheslav Yershov (KAZ)	GR
