= 2004 European Weightlifting Championships =

International weightlifting competition

- Location: Kyiv, Ukraine
- Dates: 20–25 April

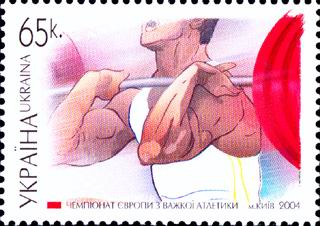
Ukrainian stamp dedicated to the 2004 European Weightlifting Championships

The 2004 European Weightlifting Championships were held in Kyiv, Ukraine between 20-25 April 2004. It was the 83rd edition of the event.

== Medal overview ==
=== Men ===
Event	Gold	Silver	Bronze
– 56 kg	(Turkey) Sedat Artuç	(Belarus) Vitali Dzerbianiou	(Hungary) László Tancsics
– 62 kg	(Bulgaria) Sevdalin Angelov	(Romania) Adrian Jigău	(Azerbaijan) Asif Malikov
– 69 kg	(Turkey) Ekrem Celil	(Croatia) Nikolaj Pešalov	(Belarus) Siarhei Laurenau
– 77 kg	(Turkey) Taner Sağır	(Turkey) Mehmet Yılmaz	(Bulgaria) Plamen Zhelyazkov
– 85 kg	(Turkey) İzzet İnce	(Russia) Zaur Takhushev	(Turkey) Erdal Sunar
– 94 kg	(Bulgaria) Milen Dobrev	(Russia) Eduard Tyukin	(Ukraine) Anatoliy Mushyk
– 105 kg	(Bulgaria) Alan Tsagaev	(Russia) Dmitry Berestov	(Moldova) Alexandru Bratan
+ 105 kg	(Bulgaria) Velichko Cholakov	(Latvia) Viktors Ščerbatihs	(Germany) Ronny Weller

=== Women ===
Event	Gold	Silver	Bronze
– 48 kg	(Bulgaria) Izabela Dragneva	(Russia) Svetlana Ulyanova	(Spain) Rebeca Sires Rodríguez
– 53 kg	(Turkey) Nurcan Taylan	(Romania) Marioara Munteanu	(Belarus) Nastassia Novikava
– 58 kg	(Poland) Aleksandra Klejnowska	(Turkey) Aylin Daşdelen	(Bulgaria) Zlatina Atanasova
– 63 kg	(Bulgaria) Gergana Kirilova	(Poland) Dominika Misterska	(Greece) Anastasia Tsakiri
– 69 kg	(Turkey) Sibel Şimşek	(Russia) Tatiana Matveeva	(Ukraine) Vanda Maslovska
– 75 kg	(Russia) Svetlana Podobedova	(Turkey) Şule Şahbaz	(Greece) Christina Ioannidi
+ 75 kg	(Poland) Agata Wróbel	(Ukraine) Viktoriya Shaimardanova	(Turkey) Derya Açıkgöz

== Medal table ==
Rank	Nation	Gold	Silver	Bronze	Total
1	Turkey	6	3	2	11
2	Bulgaria	6	0	2	8
3	Poland	2	1	0	3
4	Russia	1	5	0	6
5	Romania	0	2	0	2
6	Belarus	0	1	2	3
6	Ukraine	0	1	2	3
8	Croatia	0	1	0	1
8	Latvia	0	1	0	1
10	Greece	0	0	2	2
11	Azerbaijan	0	0	1	1
11	Germany	0	0	1	1
11	Hungary	0	0	1	1
11	Moldova	0	0	1	1
11	Spain	0	0	1	1
Totals (15 entries)		15	15	15	45

== Men's results ==
=== Men's 56 kg ===
Rank	Athlete	Body weight	Snatch (kg)				Clean & Jerk (kg)				Total
Rank	Athlete	Body weight	1	2	3	Rank	1	2	3	Rank	Total
1st place, gold medalist(s)	Sedat Artuç (TUR)	55.40	117.5	120.0	125.0	2nd place, silver medalist(s)	140	145.0	155.0	1st place, gold medalist(s)	280.0
2nd place, silver medalist(s)	Vitali Dzerbianiou (BLR)	55.85	~~120.0~~	120.0	127.5	1st place, gold medalist(s)	145.0	~~150.0~~	152.5	2nd place, silver medalist(s)	280.0
3rd place, bronze medalist(s)	László Tancsics (HUN)	55.50	115.0	120.0	122.5	3rd place, bronze medalist(s)	140.0	142.5	147.5	3rd place, bronze medalist(s)	270.0
4	Éric Bonnel (FRA)	55.15	110.0	~~115.0~~	~~115.0~~	5	135.0	140.0	145.0	4	255.0
5	Gulbey Akti (TUR)	55.55	105.0	110.0	~~115.0~~	6	135.0	140.0	~~147.5~~	5	250.0
6	Marcin Makarski (POL)	55.75	110.0	~~112.5~~	112.5	4	132.5	137.5	~~142.5~~	7	250.0
7	Róbert Ádám (HUN)	55.25	100.0	105.0	~~107.5~~	7	125.0	130.0	~~135.0~~	9	235.0
8	Florin Veliciu (ROU)	55.80	102.5	~~107.5~~	~~107.5~~	8	120	127.5	132.5	8	235.0
9	Petr Slabý (CZE)	55.85	97.5	~~100.0~~	100.0	10	130.0	~~132.5~~	~~137.5~~	11	230.0
10	Medvei Delikian (ISR)	55.90	102.5	~~110.0~~	~~110.0~~	9	122.5	~~127.5~~	127.5	13	230.0
11	Zviadi Samukashvili (GEO)	55.25	92.5	97.5	~~100~~	11	120.0	125.0	127.5	12	225.0
12	Iván Hernández (ESP)	55.35	95.0	~~100.0~~	~~100.0~~	12	120.0	125.0	~~127.5~~	14	220.0
13	Vito Dellino (ITA)	55.60	~~90.0~~	90.0	~~95.0~~	15	125.0	130.0	~~132.5~~	10	220.0
14	Paata Modebadze (GEO)	55.70	95.0	~~100.0~~	~~100.0~~	13	112.5	117.5	~~122.5~~	15	212.5
15	Mario Pichler (AUT)	55.65	~~92.5~~	92.5	~~97.5~~	14	115.0	~~120.0~~	~~120.0~~	16	207.5
16	Arjon Breshanaj (ALB)	55.75	82.5	~~90~~	~~90~~	16	102.5	110.0	115.0	17	197.5
NR	Naiden Rusev (CYP)		~~105.0~~	~~105.0~~	~~105.0~~	NR	~~137.5~~	137.5	~~142.5~~	6	NM

=== Men's 62 kg ===
Rank	Athlete	Body weight	Snatch (kg)				Clean & Jerk (kg)				Total
Rank	Athlete	Body weight	1	2	3	Rank	1	2	3	Rank	Total
1st place, gold medalist(s)	Sevdalin Angelov (BUL)	61.60	130.0	135.0	137.5	2nd place, silver medalist(s)	160.0	165.0	~~167.5~~	2nd place, silver medalist(s)	302.5
2nd place, silver medalist(s)	Adrian Jigău (ROU)	61.25	125.0	130.0	132.5	3rd place, bronze medalist(s)	160.0	~~165.0~~	165.0	1st place, gold medalist(s)	297.5
3rd place, bronze medalist(s)	Asif Malikov (AZE)	61.45	125.0	~~127.5~~	~~127.5~~	5	155.0	~~160.0~~	~~160.0~~	3rd place, bronze medalist(s)	280.0
4	Samson Ndicka-Matam (FRA)	61.65	~~122.5~~	122.5	125.0	6	152.5	~~157.5~~	~~157.5~~	4	277.5
5	Tom Goegebuer (BEL)	61.10	117.5	122.5	~~125.0~~	7	142.5	~~147.5~~	~~147.5~~	7	265.0
6	Yassen Stoyanov (BUL)	61.65	115.0	~~120.0~~	~~120.0~~	9	~~145.0~~	~~145.0~~	145.0	6	260.0
7	Erkand Qerimaj (ALB)	61.60	102.5	107.5	112.5	11	135.0	142.5	145.0	5	257.5
8	Kamran Panjavi (GBR)	61.45	107.5	112.5	115.0	8	135.0	140.0	~~142.5~~	9	255.0
9	Zbyněk Dub (CZE)	61.50	107.5	110.0	~~112.5~~	12	137.5	142.5	~~147.5~~	8	252.5
10	Irakli Lomtadze (GEO)	60.95	105.0	110.0	112.5	10	127.5	~~132.5~~	132.5	10	245.0
11	Zaza Abuladze (GEO)	61.15	100.0	100.0	110.0	14	122.5	130.0	132.5	11	237.5
12	Iván Carcia (ESP)	61.30	~~100.0~~	100.0	107.5	13	120.0	125.0	~~127.5~~	12	237.5
NR	Leonidas Sabanis (GRE)	61.45	~~135.0~~	135.0	137.5	1st place, gold medalist(s)	~~162.5~~	~~162.5~~	~~162.5~~	NR	NM
NR	Giuliano Cornetta (ITA)	61.80	120.0	125.0	127.5	4	~~150.0~~	~~150.0~~	~~150.0~~	NR	NM

=== Men's 69 kg ===
Rank	Athlete	Body weight	Snatch (kg)				Clean & Jerk (kg)				Total
Rank	Athlete	Body weight	1	2	3	Rank	1	2	3	Rank	Total
1st place, gold medalist(s)	Ekrem Celil (TUR)	68.20	142.5	147.5	~~150.0~~	3rd place, bronze medalist(s)	180.0	185.0	190.0	1st place, gold medalist(s)	337.5
2nd place, silver medalist(s)	Nikolaj Pešalov (CRO)	68.40	142.5	147.5	~~150.0~~	4	170.0	~~180.0~~	182.5	2nd place, silver medalist(s)	330.0
3rd place, bronze medalist(s)	Siarhei Laurenau (BLR)	67.60	145.0	150.0	~~152.5~~	1st place, gold medalist(s)	~~170.0~~	170.0	175.0	3rd place, bronze medalist(s)	325.0
4	Yasin Arslan (TUR)	68.00	145.0	150.0	~~152.5~~	2nd place, silver medalist(s)	175.0	~~177.5~~	~~177.5~~	4	325.0
5	Andrei Matveev (RUS)	68.80	140.0	~~145.0~~	145.0	6	~~175.0~~	175.0	~~182.5~~	6	320.0
6	Miroslav Janíček (SVK)	68.90	137.5	142.5	~~145.0~~	7	170.0	175.0		7	317.5
7	Romuald Ernault (FRA)	68.60	~~140.0~~	140.0	145.0	5	165.0	170.0	~~172.5~~	12	315.0
8	Giorgios Tzelilis (GRE)	68.75	140.0	~~145.0~~	~~145.0~~	9	170.0	~~175.0~~	175.0	5	315.0
9	Afgan Bayramov (AZE)	67.05	132.5	137.5	~~140.0~~	10	~~167.5~~	~~170.0~~	170.0	9	307.5
10	Giuseppe Ficco (ITA)	68.95	135.0	~~137.5~~	~~137.5~~	12	172.5	~~177.5~~	~~177.5~~	8	307.5
11	Artur Danielyan (ARM)	67.90	130.0	~~135.0~~	~~135.0~~	13	165.0	170.0	~~175.0~~	10	300.0
12	Valerios Leonidis (GRE)	67.90	~~130.0~~	130.0	~~135.0~~	14	170.0	~~175.0~~	~~175.0~~	11	300.0
13	Stănel Stoica (ROU)	68.45	135.0	140.0	~~145.0~~	8	160.0	~~165.0~~	~~165.0~~	15	300.0
14	Armen Ghazaryan (ARM)	68.50	~~130.0~~	130.0	135.0	11	165.0	~~170.0~~	~~170.0~~	13	300.0
15	Emiliano Kosta (ALB)	68.60	120.0	125.0	127.5	17	152.5	157.5	162.5	14	290.0
16	Giorgio De Luca (ITA)	68.30	125.0	130.0	~~135.0~~	15	155.0	~~160.0~~	~~160.0~~	17	285.0
17	Taulant Çerepi (ALB)	68.20	117.5	122.5	125.0	18	150.0	157.0		16	282.5
18	Radim Kozel (CZE)	68.40	125.0	130.0	~~132.5~~	16	145.0	150.0	~~152.5~~	19	280.0
19	Manuel Martín (ESP)	68.70	120.0	~~125.0~~	~~125.0~~	20	155.0	~~160.0~~	~~160.0~~	18	275.0
20	Yvgeny Kosinetz (ISR)	68.80	115.0	120.0	125.0	19	145.0	150.0	~~155.0~~	20	275.0
21	Miloš Sušanj (CRO)	68.50	100.0	~~105.0~~	~~105.0~~	21	125.0	130.0	~~135.0~~	21	230.0

=== Men's 77 kg ===
Rank	Athlete	Body weight	Snatch (kg)				Clean & Jerk (kg)				Total
Rank	Athlete	Body weight	1	2	3	Rank	1	2	3	Rank	Total
1st place, gold medalist(s)	Taner Sağır (TUR)	76.65	160.0	165.0	167.5	1st place, gold medalist(s)	192.5	197.5	200.0	1st place, gold medalist(s)	367.5
2nd place, silver medalist(s)	Mehmet Yılmaz (TUR)	76.15	157.5	162.5	~~167.5~~	3rd place, bronze medalist(s)	185.0	192.5	197.5	2nd place, silver medalist(s)	360.0
3rd place, bronze medalist(s)	Plamen Zhelyazkov (BUL)	76.75	~~160.0~~	160.0	165.0	2nd place, silver medalist(s)	190.0	195.0	~~205.0~~	3rd place, bronze medalist(s)	360.0
4	Sebastian Dogariu (ROU)	76.60	155.0	160.0	~~162.5~~	4	185.0	190.0	192.5	4	352.5
5	Krzysztof Szramiak (POL)	76.60	152.5	157.5	~~160.0~~	5	182.5	180.0	~~187.5~~	7	342.5
6	Victor Mitrou (GRE)	76.10	150.0	~~155.0~~	~~157.5~~	9	185.0	190.0	~~195.0~~	5	340.0
7	René Hoch (GER)	76.60	147.5	150.0	~~152.5~~	10	182.5	187.5	190.0	6	340.0
8	Georg Aleksanyan (ARM)	76.80	150.0	155.0	~~157.5~~	8	~~185.0~~	~~185.0~~	185.0	8	340.0
9	Theoharis Trasha (ALB)	76.45	150.0	~~155.0~~	155.0	6	172.5	180.0	182.5	10	337.5
10	Arsen Melikyan (ARM)	76.60	~~155.0~~	155.0	~~160.0~~	7	182.5	~~192.5~~	~~192.5~~	11	337.5
11	Janusz Czaban (FRA)	76.25	145.0	~~150.0~~	~~150.0~~	13	175.0	180.0	182.5	9	327.5
12	Ali El-Moujoud (FRA)	76.40	~~137.5~~	137.5	142.5	17	175.0	~~182.5~~	~~185.0~~	12	317.5
13	Konstantin Gerasimov (LTU)	74.45	135.0	140.0	145.0	12	~~170.0~~	170.0	~~180.0~~	14	315.0
14	Angelo Mannironi (ITA)	76.90	~~140.0~~	140.0	145.0	14	170.0	~~175.0~~	~~175.0~~	16	315.0
15	David Pavliashvili (GEO)	75.80	135.0	~~140.0~~	~~140.0~~	22	165.0	~~170.0~~	170.0	15	305.0
16	Armiche Arvelo (ESP)	76.75	132.5	137.5	~~142.5~~	20	~~167.5~~	167.5	~~172.5~~	17	305.0
17	Sergio Martínez (ESP)	74.60	137.5	142.5	~~145.0~~	16	160.0	~~167.5~~	~~167.5~~	19	302.5
18	Pavol Svrček (SVK)	76.65	~~142.5~~	142.5	~~147.5~~	18	160.0	~~165.0~~	~~165.0~~	21	302.5
19	Pavel Kolossovsky (ISR)	76.80	130.0	137.5	~~140.0~~	15	160.0	165.0	~~170.0~~	18	302.5
20	Temuri Chkeheidze (GEO)	76.90	135.0	140.0	145.0	15	155.0	~~160.0~~	~~160.0~~	23	300.0
21	Endri Haxhihyseni (ALB)	76.60	135.0	140.0	~~145.0~~	19	155.0			22	295.0
22	Jonis Stonas (LTU)	76.50	~~127.5~~	127.5	~~132.5~~	23	160.0	~~165.0~~	~~165.0~~	20	287.5
23	Adam Travis (GBR)	75.80	120.0	~~125.0~~	125.0	24	152.5	~~160.0~~	~~162.5~~	24	277.5
NR	Vasile Hegheduș (ROU)	76.85	~~150.0~~	150.0	~~155.0~~	11	~~185.0~~	~~185.0~~	~~185.0~~	NR	NM
NR	Zoltán Sumegi (HUN)	76.40	~~142.5~~	~~142.5~~	~~142.5~~	NR	175.0	~~180.0~~	~~182.5~~	13	NM

=== Men's 85 kg ===
Rank	Athlete	Body weight	Snatch (kg)				Clean & Jerk (kg)				Total
Rank	Athlete	Body weight	1	2	3	Rank	1	2	3	Rank	Total
1st place, gold medalist(s)	İzzet İnce (TUR)	84.20	170.0	~~175.0~~	175.0	2nd place, silver medalist(s)	200.0	~~205.0~~	205.0	3rd place, bronze medalist(s)	380.0
2nd place, silver medalist(s)	Zaur Takhushev (RUS)	83.90	170.0	175.0	177.5	1st place, gold medalist(s)	~~195.0~~	195.0	200.0	8	377.5
3rd place, bronze medalist(s)	Erdal Sunar (TUR)	84.50	~~170.0~~	~~170.0~~	172.5	4	195.0	202.5	205.0	4	377.5
4	Georgios Markoulas (GRE)	84.60	~~162.5~~	162.5	167.5	8	202.5	207.5	~~212.5~~	2nd place, silver medalist(s)	375.0
5	Pyrros Dimas (GRE)	84.70	165.0	~~170.0~~	170.0	6	~~200.0~~	200.0	205.0	5	375.0
6	Oleksandr Lahodny (UKR)	84.80	162.5	167.5	~~172.5~~	9	195.0	200.0	~~207.5~~	9	367.5
7	Volodymyr Bondar (UKR)	83.80	160.0	~~165.0~~	165.0	10	195.0	200.0	~~205.0~~	7	365.0
8	Andrei Rybakou (BLR)	84.50	~~175.0~~	175.0	~~180.0~~	3rd place, bronze medalist(s)	190.0	~~197.5~~	~~197.5~~	17	365.0
9	Ilir Kafarani (ALB)	84.75	155.0	160.0	~~165.0~~	15	195.0	202.5	~~207.5~~	6	362.5
10	Tigran Martirosyan (ARM)	81.65	155.0	~~160.0~~	162.5	12	197.5	~~202.5~~	~~202.5~~	11	360.0
11	Mariusz Rytkowski (POL)	84.35	162.5	~~167.5~~	~~167.5~~	13	197.5	~~202.5~~	~~205.0~~	11	360.0
12	Georgi Asanidze (GEO)	84.80	162.5	167.5	170.0	7	190.0	~~195.0~~	~~195.0~~	18	360.0
13	David Matam (FRA)	84.80	157.5	162.5	165.0	11	185.0	190.0	195.0	15	360.0
14	Ondrej Kutlík (SVK)	84.70	150.0	155.0	160.0	14	190.0	197.5	~~202.5~~	13	357.5
15	Yoto Yotov (CRO)	84.40	145.0	150.0	155.0	19	185.0	192.5	195.0	14	350.0
16	José Juan Navarro (ESP)	82.85	150.0	155.0	~~160.0~~	18	185.0	~~190.0~~	192.5	16	347.5
17	Petr Hrubý (CZE)	83.80	~~152.5~~	~~152.5~~	152.5	20	182.5	~~187.5~~	~~187.5~~	19	335.0
18	Deniss Žuļins (LAT)	84.85	145.0	150.0	~~152.5~~	22	~~175.0~~	175.0	180.0	21	330.0
19	Mikk Kasemaa (EST)	84.35	135.0	~~140.0~~	142.5	23	172.5	180.0	~~185.0~~	20	322.5
20	Bradley Burrowes (GBR)	83.30	140.0	~~145.0~~	~~145.0~~	24	~~170.0~~	170.0	~~175.0~~	22	310.0
21	Jesper Joergensen (DEN)	83.80	127.5	132.5	~~135.0~~	25	160.0	~~165.0~~	~~165.0~~	23	292.5
NR	Aliaksandr Anishchanka (BLR)	84.55	~~172.5~~	~~172.5~~	~~172.5~~	NR	~~202.5~~	207.5	~~212.5~~	1st place, gold medalist(s)	NM
NR	Aslanbek Ediev (RUS)	84.70	~~167.5~~	167.5	172.5	5	~~195.0~~	~~195.0~~	~~195.0~~	NR	NM
NR	Norbert Cser (HUN)	84.50	~~155.0~~	~~155.0~~	~~155.0~~	NR	190.0	197.5	~~202.5~~	12	NM
NR	Donatas Anuskeviucius (LTU)	84.60	~~157.5~~	157.5	~~162.5~~	16	~~195.0~~	~~195.0~~	~~195.0~~	NR	NM
NR	Zbyněk Vacurá (CZE)	79.60	155.0	~~160.0~~	~~160.0~~	17	~~185.0~~	~~185.0~~	~~185.0~~	NR	NM
NR	Francesco De Tommaso (ITA)	84.55	152.5	~~157.5~~	~~157.5~~	21				NR	NM
NR	Natig Hasanov (AZE)	84.60	~~155.0~~	~~155.0~~	~~155.0~~	NR	~~195.0~~	~~195.0~~		NR	NM

=== Men's 94 kg ===
Rank	Athlete	Body weight	Snatch (kg)				Clean & Jerk (kg)				Total
Rank	Athlete	Body weight	1	2	3	Rank	1	2	3	Rank	Total
1st place, gold medalist(s)	Milen Dobrev (BUL)	92.75	180.0	182.5	185.0	1st place, gold medalist(s)	215.0	217.5		1st place, gold medalist(s)	402.5
2nd place, silver medalist(s)	Eduard Tyukin (RUS)	93.25	175.0	180.0	~~182.5~~	3rd place, bronze medalist(s)	212.5	217.5	~~220.0~~	3rd place, bronze medalist(s)	397.5
3rd place, bronze medalist(s)	Anatoliy Mushyk (UKR)	92.80	170.0	175.0	177.5	5	207.5	212.5	217.5	2nd place, silver medalist(s)	395.0
4	Akakios Kakiasvilis (GRE)	93.40	172.5	~~177.5~~	177.5	6	~~215.0~~	215.0	~~220.0~~	4	392.5
5	Sergey Zhukov (RUS)	93.45	172.5	~~177.5~~	177.5	4	212.5	~~217.5~~	~~220.0~~	6	392.5
6	Nikolay Kolev (BUL)	93.80	175.0	~~180.0~~	~~180.0~~	7	215.0	~~220.0~~	~~222.5~~	5	390.0
7	Bartłomiej Bonk (POL)	93.35	167.5	~~172.5~~	172.5	8	200.0	210.0	~~215.0~~	8	382.5
8	Pavel Harkavy (BLR)	93.85	170.0	177.5	182.5	2nd place, silver medalist(s)	~~190.0~~	190.0	200.0	12	382.5
9	Nikolaos Kourtidis (GRE)	92.90	160.0	165.0	170.0	10	205.0	210.0	~~215.0~~	7	380.0
10	Egidijus Remėza (LTU)	93.35	165.0	170.0	~~175.0~~	11	205.0	210.0	~~215.0~~	9	380.0
11	Santiago Martínez (ESP)	93.90	167.5	172.5	~~175.0~~	9	200.0	205.0	~~207.5~~	11	377.5
12	Tadeusz Drzazga (POL)	93.90	170.0	~~175.0~~	~~175.0~~	12	205.0			10	375.0
13	Istvan Dioszegi (ROU)	93.00	152.5	157.5	160.0	16	185.0	190.0	195.0	14	355.0
14	Gábor Vaspöri (HUN)	93.95	155.0	~~160.0~~	160.0	17	~~195.0~~	195.0	~~202.5~~	15	355.0
15	Alphonse Matam (FRA)	93.40	157.5	~~162.5~~	~~162.5~~	19	~~190.0~~	190.0	~~197.5~~	19	347.5
16	Jürgen Spieß (GER)	90.85	150.0	~~155.0~~	155.0	20	~~185.0~~	185.0	190.0	17	345.0
17	György Ehrlich (HUN)	91.85	160.0	~~165.0~~	~~165.0~~	14	185.0	~~190.0~~	~~190.0~~	21	345.0
18	Andrus Utsar (EST)	93.20	155.0	~~160.0~~	~~160.0~~	21	190.0	~~195.0~~	~~195.0~~	18	345.0
19	Benjamin Pirkkiö (FIN)	93.95	152.5	~~157.5~~	~~157.5~~	22	182.5	187.5	192.5	16	345.0
20	Gia Machavariani (GEO)	92.70	150.0	155.0	160.0	15	175.0	180.0	182.5	22	342.5
21	Kala Adem (NED)	93.65	~~150.0~~	150.0		25	190.0			20	340.0
22	Marco Di Marzio (ITA)	91.50	152.5	157.5	~~162.5~~	18	180.0	~~187.5~~	~~187.5~~	24	337.5
23	Karl Grant (GBR)	93.70	145.0	~~152.5~~	~~152.5~~	26	182.5	~~190.0~~	~~197.5~~	23	327.5
24	Tomas Anuškevičius (LTU)	92.50	150.0	~~152.5~~	~~152.5~~	24	170.0	175.0	~~180.0~~	25	325.0
25	Paul Supple (GBR)	93.70	145.0	~~150.0~~	~~150.0~~	27	175.0	~~180.0~~	~~182.5~~	26	320.0
26	Can Osman (CYP)	88.95	115.0	120.0	125.0	28	145.0	150.0	~~155.0~~	27	275.0
NR	Eugen Bratan (MDA)	93.95	~~170.0~~	~~170.0~~	170.0	13	~~205.0~~	~~205.0~~	~~205.0~~	NR	NM
NR	Peter Havlicek (SVK)	88.40	145.0	150.0	~~155.0~~	23	~~180.0~~	~~180.0~~	~~180.0~~	NR	NM
NR	Alibek Samedov (AZE)	94.00	~~160.0~~	~~160.0~~	~~160.0~~	NR	200.0			13	NM
NR	Božo Krišto (CRO)	91.80	~~130.0~~			NR	~~150.0~~	~~155.0~~		NR	NM

=== Men's 105 kg ===
Rank	Athlete	Body weight	Snatch (kg)				Clean & Jerk (kg)				Total
Rank	Athlete	Body weight	1	2	3	Rank	1	2	3	Rank	Total
1st place, gold medalist(s)	Alan Tsagaev (BUL)	104.90	~~180.0~~	~~180.0~~	182.5	8	230.0	237.5		1st place, gold medalist(s)	420.0
2nd place, silver medalist(s)	Dmitry Berestov (RUS)	104.10	185.0	190.0	~~192.5~~	4	220.0	~~225.0~~	227.5	2nd place, silver medalist(s)	417.5
3rd place, bronze medalist(s)	Alexandru Bratan (MDA)	103.95	185.0	190.0	~~192.5~~	3rd place, bronze medalist(s)	222.5	~~227.5~~	~~227.5~~	6	412.5
4	Dmitry Klokov (RUS)	103.20	180.0	185.0	~~190.0~~	5	217.5	225.0	~~232.5~~	3rd place, bronze medalist(s)	410.0
5	Mykola Hordiychuk (UKR)	100.55	182.5	187.5	190.0	1st place, gold medalist(s)	210.0	215.0	~~220.0~~	12	405.0
6	Andre Rohde (GER)	103.70	180.0	~~185.0~~	~~187.5~~	9	220.0	225.0	~~227.5~~	4	405.0
7	Matthias Steiner (AUT)	103.90	~~180.0~~	180.0	~~182.5~~	10	~~217.5~~	217.5	225.0	5	405.0
8	Robert Dołęga (POL)	104.30	177.5	182.5	~~185.0~~	7	222.5	~~227.5~~	~~230.0~~	7	405.0
9	Alan Naniev (AZE)	104.90	185.0	~~190.0~~	~~192.5~~	6	220.0	~~225.0~~	~~225.0~~	11	405.0
10	Martin Tešovič (SVK)	102.15	180.0	185.0	190.0	2nd place, silver medalist(s)	212.5	~~220.0~~	~~220.0~~	14	402.5
11	Mikhail Audzeyeu (BLR)	104.45	175.0	180.0	~~182.5~~	13	210.0	215.0	222.5	8	402.5
12	Zoltán Kovács (HUN)	103.95	175.0	180.0	~~182.5~~	11	~~220.0~~	220.0	~~227.5~~	9	400.0
13	Jörg Mazur (GER)	104.15	175.0	180.0	~~182.5~~	12	~~210.0~~	212.5	220.0	10	400.0
14	Libor Wälzer (CZE)	104.60	165.0	170.0	172.5	14	207.5	~~215.0~~	215.0	13	387.5
15	Miikka Huhtala (FIN)	104.95	165.0	~~170.0~~	~~170.0~~	15	~~195.0~~	~~200.0~~	200.0	17	365.0
16	Janos Nemeshazy (SUI)	103.10	155.0	162.5	~~167.5~~	16	200.0	~~210.0~~		15	362.5
17	Sergejs Lazovskis (LAT)	104.20	~~155.0~~	155.0	~~160.0~~	18	200.0	~~207.5~~	~~210.0~~	16	355.0
18	Robertas Zenkevičius (LTU)	103.90	~~155.0~~	155.0	~~160.0~~	17	~~192.5~~	192.5	~~197.5~~	18	347.5
19	Delroy McQueen (GBR)	102.65	~~150.0~~	~~150.0~~	150.0	21	190.0			19	340.0
20	Saša Čegar (CRO)	103.80	150.0	152.5	~~155.0~~	20	180.0	~~185.0~~	185.0	21	337.5
21	Gunnar Løgdahl (SWE)	102.80	~~147.5~~	~~147.5~~	150.0	22	~~185.0~~	185.0	~~190.0~~	20	335.0
22	Isa Bala (ALB)	103.75	140.0	152.5	~~155.0~~	19	160.0	170.0	~~175.0~~	22	322.5
NR	Moreno Boer (ITA)	104.50	~~180.0~~	~~180.0~~	~~180.0~~	NR				NR	NM

=== Women's 48 kg ===
Rank	Athlete	Body weight	Snatch (kg)				Clean & Jerk (kg)				Total
Rank	Athlete	Body weight	1	2	3	Rank	1	2	3	Rank	Total
1st place, gold medalist(s)	Izabela Dragneva (BUL)	47.90	80.0	82.5	~~85.0~~	1st place, gold medalist(s)	97.5	~~100.0~~	~~102.5~~	2nd place, silver medalist(s)	180.0
2nd place, silver medalist(s)	Svetlana Ulyanova (RUS)	47.55	~~75.0~~	75.0	~~77.5~~	5	95.0	~~100.0~~	100.0	1st place, gold medalist(s)	175.0
3rd place, bronze medalist(s)	Rebeca Sires Rodríguez (ESP)	47.85	75.0	77.5	80.0	3rd place, bronze medalist(s)	90.0	92.5	95.0	3rd place, bronze medalist(s)	175.0
4	Gema Peris (ESP)	47.25	75.0	77.5	80.0	2nd place, silver medalist(s)	~~90.0~~	90.0	92.5	4	172.5
5	Genny Pagliaro (ITA)	47.20	72.5	75.0	~~77.5~~	4	90.0	~~95.0~~	~~95.0~~	5	165.0
6	Sabrina Richard (FRA)	47.45	~~70.0~~	70.0	~~72.5~~	6	85.0	~~90.0~~	90.0	6	160.0
7	Marta Kleszczyńska (POL)	47.65	65.0	67.5	~~70.0~~	10	82.5	87.5	90.0	7	157.5
8	Dahiba Rigaud (FRA)	47.45	~~67.5~~	67.5	~~72.5~~	9	85.0	87.5	~~90.0~~	8	155.0
9	Giovanna D'Alessandro (ITA)	47.00	62.5	65.0	67.5	8	~~80.0~~	80.0	85.0	9	152.5
10	Cristina Maftei (ROU)	47.70	65.0	70.0	~~72.5~~	7	80.0	~~85.0~~	~~85.0~~	11	150.0
11	Adel Ondos (HUN)	47.85	62.5	65.0	67.5	11	80.0	~~82.5~~	82.5	10	150.0
12	Maria Pipliaridou (GRE)	47.85	57.5	62.5	~~65.0~~	12	70.0	75.0	~~80.0~~	13	137.5
13	Sini Kukkonen (FIN)	47.85	60.0	~~62.5~~	~~62.5~~	13	75.0	~~77.5~~	~~77.5~~	12	135.0
14	Kate Howard (GBR)	47.65	~~57.5~~	57.5	~~60.0~~	14	~~72.5~~	72.5	~~75.0~~	15	127.5
15	Johanna Walzak (GER)	47.75	52.5	55.0	~~57.5~~	15	70.0	72.5	~~75.0~~	14	127.5
16	Rebecca Heard (GBR)	46.85	~~52.5~~	52.5	55.0	16	65.0	~~70.0~~	~~70.0~~	17	120.0
17	Jensen Oervad (DEN)	47.05	~~40.0~~	40.0	~~45.0~~	17	50.0	55.0	~~60.0~~	18	95.0
NR	Petra Klimparová (CZE)	47.75	~~55.0~~	~~55.0~~	~~55.0~~	NR	62.5	67.5	70.0	16	NM
