= 2009 World Weightlifting Championships – Men's 85 kg =

The men's competition in the light-heavyweight (– 85 kg) division was staged on November 26, 2009.

== Schedule ==
Date	Time	Event
26 November 2009	13:00	Group C
26 November 2009	16:00	Group B
26 November 2009	19:00	Group A

== Medalists ==
Event	Gold		Silver		Bronze	
Snatch	Lu Yong (CHN)	175 kg	Tigran Martirosyan (ARM)	172 kg	Siarhei Lahun (BLR)	171 kg
Clean & Jerk	Siarhei Lahun (BLR)	209 kg	Lu Yong (CHN)	208 kg	Gevorik Poghosyan (ARM)	208 kg
Total	Lu Yong (CHN)	383 kg	Siarhei Lahun (BLR)	380 kg	Vladimir Kuznetsov (KAZ)	376 kg

== Records ==
Prior to this competition, the existing world records were as follows.

World Record	Snatch	Andrei Rybakou (BLR)	187 kg	Chiang Mai, Thailand	22 September 2007
World Record	Clean & Jerk	Zhang Yong (CHN)	218 kg	Ramat Gan, Israel	25 April 1998
World Record	Total	~~Andrei Rybakou (BLR)~~; Lu Yong (CHN)	~~394 kg~~ 394 kg	~~Beijing, China~~; Beijing, China	~~15 August 2008~~; 15 August 2008

- Andrei Rybakou's world record was rescinded in 2016.

== Results ==
Rank	Athlete	Group	Body weight	Snatch (kg)				Clean & Jerk (kg)				Total
Rank	Athlete	Group	Body weight	1	2	3	Rank	1	2	3	Rank	Total
1st place, gold medalist(s)	Lu Yong (CHN)	A	84.68	170	175	175	1st place, gold medalist(s)	206	208	~~211~~	2nd place, silver medalist(s)	383
2nd place, silver medalist(s)	Siarhei Lahun (BLR)	A	83.90	163	168	171	3rd place, bronze medalist(s)	200	205	209	1st place, gold medalist(s)	380
3rd place, bronze medalist(s)	Vladimir Kuznetsov (KAZ)	A	83.93	165	170	~~172~~	5	200	202	206	4	376
4	Gevorik Poghosyan (ARM)	A	84.85	162	166	~~168~~	7	201	208	~~211~~	3rd place, bronze medalist(s)	374
5	Intigam Zairov (AZE)	A	84.53	165	~~170~~	170	6	200	~~202~~	203	7	373
6	Adrian Zieliński (POL)	A	84.94	167	171	~~173~~	4	197	201	~~206~~	8	372
7	Yoelmis Hernández (CUB)	B	83.93	153	158	162	8	195	201	205	5	367
8	Roman Khamatshin (RUS)	A	84.62	161	~~165~~	~~165~~	10	200	~~207~~	~~207~~	9	361
9	Sherzodjon Yusupov (UZB)	B	81.10	148	152	155	13	192	196	203	6	358
10	Jadier Valladares (CUB)	B	84.71	156	162	~~165~~	9	193	~~198~~	~~200~~	11	355
11	Tom Schwarzbach (GER)	B	84.92	145	150	~~153~~	15	190	196	~~201~~	10	346
12	Kendrick Farris (USA)	B	84.92	~~154~~	154	~~157~~	14	~~191~~	191	~~198~~	13	345
13	Matt Bruce (USA)	B	84.32	142	147	~~152~~	16	182	188	191	12	338
14	Richard Tkáč (SVK)	B	84.92	~~153~~	154	158	12	180	~~184~~	~~184~~	16	338
15	Simplice Ribouem (AUS)	B	84.62	146	~~151~~	~~151~~	17	180	187	~~195~~	14	333
16	Inoýat Jumaýew (TKM)	C	82.74	135	142	~~148~~	19	170	180	183	15	325
17	Richie Patterson (NZL)	C	84.09	140	144	~~147~~	18	178	~~184~~	~~184~~	17	322
18	Paul Dumais (CAN)	C	83.90	140	~~145~~	~~145~~	20	~~165~~	165	~~173~~	18	305
19	Ahmed Al-Ijla (PLE)	C	84.72	105	112	~~118~~	22	130	140	~~148~~	19	252
20	Hansley Gaya (MRI)	C	84.45	102	106	110	23	~~138~~	138	~~147~~	20	248
21	Ismail Abdullah Ismail (UAE)	C	78.95	~~90~~	90	~~95~~	24	110	~~127~~	~~127~~	21	200
—	Tigran Martirosyan (ARM)	A	84.72	172	~~176~~	~~176~~	2nd place, silver medalist(s)	—	—	—	—	—
—	Benjamin Hennequin (FRA)	A	84.04	~~160~~	160	~~165~~	11	~~202~~	~~202~~	~~202~~	—	—
—	Majeti Fetrie (GHA)	C	83.21	~~115~~	~~115~~	115	21	~~165~~	~~165~~	~~165~~	—	—
—	Mansurbek Chashemov (UZB)	A	84.16	~~160~~	—	—	—	~~200~~	—	—	—	—
