= 2005 World Weightlifting Championships – Men's 85 kg =

The 2005 World Weightlifting Championships were held in Doha, Qatar from 9 November to 17 November. The men's 85 kilograms division was staged on 14 November 2005.

== Schedule ==
Date	Time	Event
14 November 2005	15:00	Group C
14 November 2005	17:30	Group B
14 November 2005	20:00	Group A

== Medalists ==
Event	Gold		Silver		Bronze	
Snatch	Andrei Rybakou (BLR)	185 kg	Oleg Perepetchenov (RUS)	175 kg	Vyacheslav Yershov (KAZ)	175 kg
Clean & Jerk	Ilya Ilyin (KAZ)	216 kg	Aslanbek Ediev (RUS)	211 kg	Lu Yong (CHN)	210 kg
Total	Ilya Ilyin (KAZ)	386 kg	Lu Yong (CHN)	385 kg	Aslanbek Ediev (RUS)	381 kg

== Records ==
Prior to this competition, the existing world records were as follows.

World Record	Snatch	Andrei Rybakou (BLR)	182 kg	Havířov, Czech Republic	2 June 2002
World Record	Clean & Jerk	Zhang Yong (CHN)	218 kg	Ramat Gan, Israel	25 April 1998
World Record	Total	World Standard	395 kg	—	1 January 1998

== Results ==
Rank	Athlete	Group	Body weight	Snatch (kg)				Clean & Jerk (kg)				Total
Rank	Athlete	Group	Body weight	1	2	3	Rank	1	2	3	Rank	Total
1st place, gold medalist(s)	Ilya Ilyin (KAZ)	A	84.65	165	170	~~173~~	7	205	211	216	1st place, gold medalist(s)	386
2nd place, silver medalist(s)	Lu Yong (CHN)	A	84.35	165	171	175	4	200	205	210	3rd place, bronze medalist(s)	385
3rd place, bronze medalist(s)	Aslanbek Ediev (RUS)	A	84.73	~~170~~	~~170~~	170	8	200	207	211	2nd place, silver medalist(s)	381
4	Oleg Perepetchenov (RUS)	A	82.57	170	173	175	2nd place, silver medalist(s)	~~205~~	205	~~212~~	5	380
5	Andrei Rybakou (BLR)	B	84.70	180	183	185	1st place, gold medalist(s)	195	~~200~~	~~200~~	12	380
6	Yuan Aijun (CHN)	A	84.28	165	170	173	5	205	~~212~~	~~212~~	6	378
7	Vyacheslav Yershov (KAZ)	A	82.67	170	175	~~180~~	3rd place, bronze medalist(s)	200	~~205~~	~~205~~	8	375
8	Tigran Martirosyan (ARM)	A	84.07	167	~~172~~	172	6	202	~~207~~	~~207~~	7	374
9	Valeriu Calancea (ROM)	A	84.50	~~160~~	160	165	9	202	~~207~~	207	4	372
10	Karol Gorczyczewski (POL)	B	84.99	~~160~~	160	165	11	190	195	200	10	365
11	José Oliver Ruiz (COL)	B	83.88	150	155	~~157~~	14	190	195	200	9	355
12	Héctor Ballesteros (COL)	B	83.55	150	155	157	13	190	195	~~200~~	11	352
13	Ondrej Kutlík (SVK)	B	84.98	155	~~159~~	~~160~~	15	195	~~200~~	~~201~~	13	350
14	Chad Vaughn (USA)	B	84.98	145	150	~~155~~	16	185	~~193~~	~~193~~	15	335
15	Octavio Mejías (VEN)	B	82.82	~~145~~	145	~~148~~	19	181	186	~~188~~	14	331
16	Ali El-Moujoud (FRA)	C	80.50	140	145	148	17	177	~~182~~	~~182~~	16	325
17	Norbert Cser (HUN)	C	83.30	140	145	148	18	171	~~176~~	~~177~~	20	319
18	Juan Quiterio (DOM)	C	82.68	136	141	~~146~~	20	172	177	~~179~~	17	318
19	Pavel Kolosovski (ISR)	C	84.16	140	~~145~~	~~145~~	21	170	174	~~180~~	19	314
20	Ruslan Ramazanow (TKM)	C	84.18	135	~~140~~	140	22	165	170	~~175~~	21	310
21	Uati Maposua (SAM)	C	83.74	127	134	137	23	158	~~165~~	165	23	302
22	Mansur Rejepow (TKM)	C	79.96	~~135~~	~~135~~	135	24	160	165	170	22	300
—	Sherwin Chia (SIN)	C	82.75	107	112	115	26	~~135~~	~~135~~	~~140~~	—	—
—	Ahmed Al-Ijla (PLE)	C	83.69	~~110~~	117	121	25	~~140~~	~~145~~	~~147~~	—	—
—	Donatas Anuškevičius (LTU)	B	84.55	160	~~165~~	165	10	~~195~~	~~195~~	~~195~~	—	—
—	Innocent Ukpong (USA)	B	84.83	~~140~~	~~140~~	~~140~~	—	175	~~185~~	~~185~~	18	—
—	Arsen Melikyan (ARM)	A	84.97	162	~~165~~	~~165~~	12	~~193~~	—	—	—	—
—	Ilirjan Suli (ALB)	A	84.98	—	—	—	—	—	—	—	—	—

== New records ==
Snatch	183 kg	Andrei Rybakou (BLR)	WR
Snatch	185 kg	Andrei Rybakou (BLR)	WR
