= List of Israeli records in Olympic weightlifting =

The following are the national records in Olympic weightlifting in Israel. Records are maintained in each weight class for the snatch lift, clean and jerk lift, and the total for both lifts by the Israel Weightlifting Federation (איגוד הרמת משקולות בישראל).

== Current records ==
Key to tables: Awaiting ratification Not ratified or later rescinded by Israel Weightlifting Federation

=== Men ===
Event	Record	Athlete	Date	Meet	Place	Ref
60 kg
Snatch	100 kg	Standard				
Clean & Jerk	125 kg	Standard				
Total	225 kg	Standard				
65 kg
Snatch	110 kg	Standard				
Clean & Jerk	132 kg	Bar Lewi	14 May 2026			
Total	240 kg	Standard				
70 kg
Snatch	115 kg	Standard				
Clean & Jerk	140 kg	Standard				
Total	255 kg	Standard				
75 kg
Snatch	116 kg	Standard				
Clean & Jerk	144 kg	Standard				
Total	260 kg	Standard				
85 kg
Snatch	125 kg	Standard				
Clean & Jerk	155 kg	Standard				
Total	280 kg	Standard				
95 kg
Snatch	135 kg	Standard				
Clean & Jerk	165 kg	Standard				
Total	300 kg	Standard				
110 kg
Snatch	168 kg	Artur Mugurdumov	28 August 2025			
Clean & Jerk	208 kg	Artur Mugurdumov	28 August 2025			
Total	376 kg	Artur Mugurdumov	28 August 2025			
+110 kg
Snatch	152 kg	Alon Shahar	7 July 2026	Maccabiah Games	Tel Aviv, Israel	
Clean & Jerk	190 kg	Alon Shahar	15 March 2026			
Total	342 kg	Alon Shahar	7 July 2026	Maccabiah Games	Tel Aviv, Israel	

=== Women ===
Event	Record	Athlete	Date	Meet	Place	Ref
49 kg
Snatch	65 kg	Standard				
Clean & Jerk	80 kg	Standard				
Total	145 kg	Standard				
53 kg
Snatch	70 kg	Standard				
Clean & Jerk	94 kg	May Hazan	6 July 2026	Maccabiah Games	Tel Aviv, Israel	
Total	164 kg	May Hazan	6 July 2026	Maccabiah Games	Tel Aviv, Israel	
57 kg
Snatch	75 kg	Standard				
Clean & Jerk	90 kg	Standard				
Total	165 kg	Standard				
61 kg
Snatch	80 kg	Standard				
Clean & Jerk	95 kg	Standard				
Total	175 kg	Standard				
69 kg
Snatch	85 kg	Standard				
Clean & Jerk	100 kg	Standard				
Total	185 kg	Standard				
77 kg
Snatch	103 kg	Nicole Rubanovich	20 August 2025			
Clean & Jerk	131 kg	Celia Gold	6 February 2026			
Total	232 kg	Celia Gold	6 February 2026			
86 kg
Snatch	95 kg					
Clean & Jerk	110 kg					
Total	205 kg					
+86 kg
Snatch	98 kg					
Clean & Jerk	112 kg					
Total	210 kg					

== Historical records ==
=== Men (2018–2025) ===
Event	Record	Athlete	Date	Meet	Place	Ref
55 kg
Snatch	100 kg	Standard				
Clean & Jerk	120 kg	Standard				
Total	220 kg	Standard				
61 kg
Snatch	112 kg	Standard				
Clean & Jerk	133 kg	Standard				
Total	245 kg	Standard				
67 kg
Snatch	122 kg	Standard				
Clean & Jerk	145 kg	Bar Lewi	22 November 2019		Herzliya, Israel	
Total	265 kg	Standard				
73 kg
Snatch	130 kg	Standard				
Clean & Jerk	150 kg	Standard				
Total	280 kg	Standard				
81 kg
Snatch	140 kg	Standard				
Clean & Jerk	161 kg	Daniel Chertkov	3 August 2019		Herzliya, Israel	
Total	300 kg	Standard				
89 kg
Snatch	147 kg	Standard				
Clean & Jerk	185 kg	Valentin Gnessin	2 August 2020		Herzliya, Israel	
Total	330 kg	Valentin Gnessin	2 August 2020		Herzliya, Israel	
96 kg
Snatch	160 kg	Artur Mugurdumov	7 November 2018	World Championships	Ashgabat, Turkmenistan	
Clean & Jerk	197 kg	Artur Mugurdumov	11 April 2019	European Championships	Batumi, Georgia	
Total	351 kg	Artur Mugurdumov	11 April 2019	European Championships	Batumi, Georgia	
102 kg
Snatch	165 kg	Artur Mugurdumov	23 December 2023		Herzliya, Israel	
Clean & Jerk	207 kg	Artur Mugurdumov	5 October 2019	Mediterranean Cup	Serravalle, San Marino	
Total	371 kg	Artur Mugurdumov	5 October 2019	Mediterranean Cup	Serravalle, San Marino	
109 kg
Snatch	165 kg	Standard				
Clean & Jerk	205 kg	Standard				
Total	370 kg	Standard				
+109 kg
Snatch	188 kg	David Litvinov	11 April 2021	European Championships	Moscow, Russia	
Clean & Jerk	220 kg	David Litvinov	5 June 2022	European Championships	Tirana, Albania	
Total	406 kg	David Litvinov	5 June 2022	European Championships	Tirana, Albania	

=== Men (1998–2018) ===
Event	Record	Athlete	Date	Meet	Place	Ref
–56 kg
Snatch	102.5 kg	Medvei Delikian	April 2004	European Championships	Kyiv, Ukraine	
Clean & Jerk	127.5 kg	Medvei Delikian	April 2004	European Championships	Kyiv, Ukraine	
Total	230 kg	Medvei Delikian	April 2004	European Championships	Kyiv, Ukraine	
–62 kg
Snatch	117.5 kg	Medvei Delikian	2004			
Clean & Jerk	137.5 kg	Medvei Delikian	2004			
Total	252.5 kg	Medvei Delikian	2004			
–69 kg
Snatch	137.5 kg	Alexander Ignatovski	25 September 1999			
Clean & Jerk	157.5 kg	Alexander Ignatovski	25 September 1999			
Total	295 kg	Alexander Ignatovski	25 September 1999			
–77 kg
Snatch	143 kg	Pavel Kolosovski	7 June 2005	University World Cup	Villeneuve-Loubet, France	
Clean & Jerk	174 kg	Vladimir Chibikin	3 March 2012	Israeli League	Ashdod, Israel	
Total	316 kg	Pavel Kolosovski	7 June 2005	University World Cup	Villeneuve-Loubet, France	
–85 kg
Snatch	166 kg	Anatoliy Mushyk	16 July 2010			
Clean & Jerk	197 kg	Anatoliy Mushyk	16 July 2010			
Total	363 kg	Anatoliy Mushyk	16 July 2010			
–94 kg
Snatch	169 kg	Anatoliy Mushyk	26 November 2015	World Championships	Houston, United States	
Clean & Jerk	195 kg	Pavel Kolosovski	8 January 2010			
Total	363 kg	Anatoliy Mushyk	26 November 2015	World Championships	Houston, United States	
–105 kg
Snatch	165 kg	Anatoliy Mushyk	27 August 2015	Israeli Championships	Israel	
Clean & Jerk	200 kg	Artur Mugurdumov	23 February 2018	Israeli Cup	Hadar Yosef, Israel	
Total	361 kg	Artur Mugurdumov	23 February 2018	Israeli Cup	Hadar Yosef, Israel	
+105 kg
Snatch	174 kg	Igor Olshanetskyi	27 August 2015	Israeli Championships	Israel	
Clean & Jerk	217 kg	Igor Olshanetskyi	2015	Israeli League	Tel Aviv, Israel	
Total	390 kg	Igor Olshanetskyi	2015	Israeli League	Tel Aviv, Israel	

=== Women (2018–2025) ===
Event	Record	Athlete	Date	Meet	Place	Ref
45 kg
Snatch	55 kg	Standard				
Clean & Jerk	65 kg	Standard				
Total	120 kg	Standard				
49 kg
Snatch	70 kg	Olga Shapiro	28 May 2022	European Championships	Tirana, Albania	
Clean & Jerk	83 kg	Olga Shapiro	28 May 2022	European Championships	Tirana, Albania	
Total	153 kg	Olga Shapiro	28 May 2022	European Championships	Tirana, Albania	
55 kg
Snatch	80 kg	Aksana Zalatarova	1 November 2018	World Championships	Ashgabat, Turkmenistan	
Clean & Jerk	94 kg	Roni Shaham	27 October 2024	European U23 Championships	Raszyn, Poland	
Total	170 kg	Aksana Zalatarova	1 November 2018	World Championships	Ashgabat, Turkmenistan	
59 kg
Snatch	78 kg	Sarit Kalo	8 April 2019	European Championships	Batumi, Georgia	
Clean & Jerk	98 kg	Sarit Kalo	8 April 2019	European Championships	Batumi, Georgia	
Total	176 kg	Sarit Kalo	8 April 2019	European Championships	Batumi, Georgia	
64 kg
Snatch	82 kg		3 August 2019	Israeli Championships	Herzliya, Israel	
Clean & Jerk	105 kg	Sarit Kalo	23 February 2019	Israeli Cup	Haifa, Israel	
Total	185 kg	Sarit Kalo	23 February 2019	Israeli Cup	Haifa, Israel	
71 kg
Snatch	101 kg	Celia Gold	7 April 2024	World Cup	Phuket, Thailand	
Clean & Jerk	128 kg	Celia Gold	16 February 2024	European Championships	Sofia, Bulgaria	
Total	226 kg	Celia Gold	16 February 2024	European Championships	Sofia, Bulgaria	
76 kg
Snatch	102 kg	Nicole Rubanovich	10 February 2023		Herzliya, Israel	
Clean & Jerk	127 kg	Celia Gold	2 August 2024	Israeli Championships	Herzliya, Israel	
Total	222 kg	Celia Gold	2 August 2024	Israeli Championships	Herzliya, Israel	
81 kg
Snatch	95 kg	Nicole Rubanovich	9 April 2021	European Championships	Moscow, Russia	
Clean & Jerk	115 kg	Nicole Rubanovich	9 April 2021	European Championships	Moscow, Russia	
Total	210 kg	Nicole Rubanovich	9 April 2021	European Championships	Moscow, Russia	
87 kg
Snatch	98 kg	Standard				
Clean & Jerk	117 kg	Standard				
Total	215 kg	Standard				
+87 kg
Snatch	100 kg	Standard				
Clean & Jerk	120 kg	Standard				
Total	220 kg	Standard				

=== Women (1998–2018) ===
Event	Record	Athlete	Date	Meet	Place	Ref
–48 kg
Snatch	59 kg	Daria Trifonov	28 April 2012			
Clean & Jerk	68 kg	Renata Natan	14 January 2012	Israeli League	Ashdod, Israel	
Total	126 kg	Renata Natan	14 January 2012	Israeli League	Ashdod, Israel	
–53 kg
Snatch	80 kg	Michal Shachar	1999		Hungary	
Clean & Jerk	92.5 kg	Michal Shachar	21 November 1999	World Championships	Athens, Greece	
Total	170 kg	Michal Shachar	21 November 1999	World Championships	Athens, Greece	
–58 kg
Snatch	87 kg	Elena Lyabina	11 April 2012	European Championships	Antalya, Turkey	
Clean & Jerk	107 kg	Elena Lyabina	11 April 2012	European Championships	Antalya, Turkey	
Total	194 kg	Elena Lyabina	11 April 2012	European Championships	Antalya, Turkey	
–63 kg
Snatch	87 kg	Marina Ohman	8 April 2009	European Championships	Bucharest, Romania	
Clean & Jerk	103 kg	Marina Ohman	8 April 2009	European Championships	Bucharest, Romania	
Total	190 kg	Marina Ohman	8 April 2009	European Championships	Bucharest, Romania	
–69 kg
Snatch	90 kg	Marina Ohman	6 March 2010		Ashdod, Israel	
Clean & Jerk	110 kg	Marina Ohman	14 February 2009			
Total	196 kg	Marina Ohman	6 March 2010		Ashdod, Israel	
–75 kg
Snatch	96 kg	Nicole Rubanovich	23 February 2018	Israeli Cup	Hadar Yosef, Israel	
Clean & Jerk	111 kg	Nicole Rubanovich	23 February 2018	Israeli Cup	Hadar Yosef, Israel	
Total	207 kg	Nicole Rubanovich	23 February 2018	Israeli Cup	Hadar Yosef, Israel	
–90 kg
Snatch	92 kg	Nicole Rubanovich	7 April 2017	European Championships	Split, Croatia	
Clean & Jerk	107 kg	Nicole Rubanovich	7 April 2017	European Championships	Split, Croatia	
Total	199 kg	Nicole Rubanovich	7 April 2017	European Championships	Split, Croatia	
+90 kg
Snatch	80 kg	Standard				
Clean & Jerk	105 kg	Standard				
Total	185 kg	Standard				
