= 2006 World Weightlifting Championships – Men's 85 kg =

The 2006 World Weightlifting Championships were held in Santo Domingo, Dominican Republic from 30 September to 7 October. The men's 85 kilograms division was staged on 4 and 5 October 2006.

== Schedule ==
Date	Time	Event
4 October 2006	18:00	Group D
4 October 2006	20:00	Group C
5 October 2006	10:00	Group B
5 October 2006	14:00	Group A

== Medalists ==
Event	Gold		Silver		Bronze	
Snatch	Andrei Rybakou (BLR)	180 kg	Tigran Martirosyan (ARM)	172 kg	Aslanbek Ediev (RUS)	172 kg
Clean & Jerk	Andrei Rybakou (BLR)	203 kg	Roman Khamatshin (RUS)	203 kg	Aslanbek Ediev (RUS)	201 kg
Total	Andrei Rybakou (BLR)	383 kg	Aslanbek Ediev (RUS)	373 kg	Tigran Martirosyan (ARM)	370 kg

== Records ==
Prior to this competition, the existing world records were as follows.

World Record	Snatch	Andrei Rybakou (BLR)	186 kg	Władysławowo, Poland	6 May 2006
World Record	Clean & Jerk	Zhang Yong (CHN)	218 kg	Ramat Gan, Israel	25 April 1998
World Record	Total	World Standard	395 kg	—	1 January 1998

== Results ==
Rank	Athlete	Group	Body weight	Snatch (kg)				Clean & Jerk (kg)				Total
Rank	Athlete	Group	Body weight	1	2	3	Rank	1	2	3	Rank	Total
1st place, gold medalist(s)	Andrei Rybakou (BLR)	A	84.53	180	~~187~~	~~187~~	1st place, gold medalist(s)	200	203	~~210~~	1st place, gold medalist(s)	383
2nd place, silver medalist(s)	Aslanbek Ediev (RUS)	A	84.98	168	172	~~174~~	3rd place, bronze medalist(s)	~~195~~	195	201	3rd place, bronze medalist(s)	373
3rd place, bronze medalist(s)	Tigran Martirosyan (ARM)	A	84.41	167	172	~~175~~	2nd place, silver medalist(s)	~~198~~	198	~~202~~	6	370
4	Vyacheslav Yershov (KAZ)	A	82.08	165	~~170~~	170	5	180	190	197	7	367
5	Vadzim Straltsou (BLR)	A	84.86	~~165~~	165	170	6	195	~~203~~	~~203~~	10	365
6	Roman Khamatshin (RUS)	A	84.85	~~160~~	~~160~~	160	12	195	203	~~211~~	2nd place, silver medalist(s)	363
7	Valeriu Calancea (ROM)	A	84.35	158	~~162~~	162	9	200	~~205~~	~~205~~	4	362
8	Héctor Ballesteros (COL)	B	84.42	152	155	160	10	192	~~200~~	200	5	360
9	Yuan Aijun (CHN)	A	84.60	163	~~168~~	~~168~~	8	197	~~205~~	~~205~~	8	360
10	Georgi Markov (BUL)	A	84.68	160	~~165~~	~~165~~	11	190	195	—	9	355
11	Endri Haxhihyseni (ALB)	A	84.24	~~163~~	~~163~~	163	7	190	~~196~~	~~196~~	18	353
12	José Oliver Ruiz (COL)	B	84.80	152	155	158	13	~~192~~	192	~~200~~	14	350
13	Gaber Mohamed (EGY)	B	85.00	155	158	~~161~~	14	187	192	196	15	350
14	Her Jin (KOR)	B	84.42	147	152	~~154~~	17	185	190	192	13	344
15	Kendrick Farris (USA)	B	84.85	145	150	~~153~~	24	188	193	~~195~~	12	343
16	Ulanbek Moldodosov (KGZ)	B	82.51	~~150~~	~~150~~	150	19	~~181~~	181	190	16	340
17	Yoto Yotov (CRO)	C	83.93	141	146	150	21	180	185	190	17	340
18	Kim Seon-jong (KOR)	B	84.96	145	~~150~~	~~150~~	31	190	195	~~199~~	11	340
19	Kostyantyn Selivanov (UKR)	B	84.89	145	150	~~153~~	25	185	188	~~191~~	19	338
20	Mariusz Rytkowski (POL)	B	84.98	152	~~157~~	~~157~~	18	183	~~186~~	186	21	338
21	Intigam Zairov (AZE)	C	84.89	~~150~~	150	~~157~~	26	180	186	~~191~~	20	336
22	Norbert Cser (HUN)	B	83.85	~~145~~	145	150	20	179	185	~~187~~	22	335
23	Sergey Sedov (KAZ)	B	84.59	150	155	~~158~~	16	176	~~181~~	~~182~~	28	331
24	Innocent Ukpong (USA)	C	84.63	143	~~147~~	147	27	184	~~189~~	~~194~~	23	331
25	Adriano Méndez (ESP)	C	84.20	140	145	~~150~~	30	~~180~~	180	183	24	328
26	Juan Quiterio (DOM)	C	83.66	140	145	~~148~~	29	175	180	~~188~~	26	325
27	Artūras Skavičius (LTU)	C	84.60	142	~~150~~	~~150~~	32	181	~~187~~	~~187~~	25	323
28	Mansur Rejepow (TKM)	C	83.98	~~145~~	145	150	22	165	172	~~178~~	32	322
29	Ruslan Ramazanow (TKM)	C	84.97	142	~~146~~	146	28	170	~~175~~	175	31	321
30	Richard Tkáč (SVK)	C	84.81	145	150	~~153~~	23	170	~~174~~	~~175~~	34	320
31	Pavel Kolosovski (ISR)	C	84.71	141	~~146~~	~~146~~	34	176	~~181~~	~~181~~	29	317
32	Zoltán Gráner (HUN)	C	83.89	140	~~145~~	~~145~~	35	~~170~~	~~170~~	170	33	310
33	Jean-Philippe Maranda (CAN)	D	84.33	128	133	~~137~~	38	170	175	~~180~~	30	308
34	Darryn Anthony (RSA)	C	84.63	141	~~146~~	~~146~~	33	167	~~174~~	~~175~~	35	308
35	Jean Lavertue (CAN)	D	84.98	~~140~~	140	~~145~~	36	~~165~~	165	~~170~~	36	305
36	Mike Howarth (GBR)	D	84.98	132	136	140	37	153	158	160	38	300
37	Furkat Saidov (UZB)	D	82.95	~~130~~	130	~~140~~	40	160	—	—	37	290
38	Rodrigo García (CHI)	D	83.05	122	~~128~~	~~128~~	41	147	152	~~157~~	39	274
—	İzzet İnce (TUR)	A	84.88	171	~~173~~	~~174~~	4	~~200~~	~~200~~	~~200~~	—	—
—	David Matam (FRA)	B	84.70	152	155	157	15	~~180~~	~~180~~	~~181~~	—	—
—	Mansurbek Chashemov (UZB)	D	82.66	130	~~133~~	—	39	—	—	—	—	—
—	Víctor Llancamán (CHI)	D	84.50	~~113~~	113	~~118~~	42	~~143~~	~~143~~	~~143~~	—	—
—	Michael Böhm (GER)	C	84.14	~~146~~	~~146~~	~~146~~	—	~~176~~	176	~~180~~	27	—
—	Benjamin Hennequin (FRA)	B	84.71	~~152~~	~~152~~	~~152~~	—	—	—	—	—	—
