= Weightlifting at the 2006 Commonwealth Games – Men's 85 kg =

Weightlifting – Men's 85 kg at the 2006 Commonwealth Games
- Venue: Melbourne Exhibition Centre
- Dates: 20 March 2006
- Competitors: 9 from 8 nations
- Winning total weight: 343

Medalists
gold medal	Shujauddin Malik	Pakistan
silver medal	Brice Batchaya	Cameroon
bronze medal	Simplice Ribouem	Cameroon

The Men's 85 kg weightlifting event at the 2006 Commonwealth Games took place at the Melbourne Exhibition Centre on 20 March 2006. Shujauddin Malik, from Pakistan, won the gold, lifting a total weight of 343 kg.

== Schedule ==
All times are Australian Eastern Standard Time (UTC+10)

Date	Time	Event
20 March 2006	18:30	Group A

== Records ==
Prior to this competition, the existing world, Commonwealth and Games records were as follows:

World record	Snatch	Andrei Rybakou (BLR)	185 kg	Doha, Qatar	14 November 2005
World record	Clean & Jerk	Zhang Yong (CHN)	218 kg	Ramat Gan, Israel	25 April 1998
World record	Total	World Standard	395 kg	–	1 January 1998
Commonwealth record	Snatch	Sergo Chakhoyan (AUS)	182 kg	Moscow, Russia	27 September 2003
Commonwealth record	Clean & Jerk	Sergo Chakhoyan (AUS)	210 kg	Moscow, Russia	27 September 2003
Commonwealth record	Total	Sergo Chakhoyan (AUS)	392 kg	Moscow, Russia	27 September 2003
Games record	Snatch	Stephen Ward (ENG)	157 kg	Kuala Lumpur, Malaysia	18 September 1998
Games record	Clean & Jerk	Leon Griffin (ENG)	192 kg	Kuala Lumpur, Malaysia	18 September 1998
Games record	Total	Leon Griffin (ENG)	347 kg	Kuala Lumpur, Malaysia	18 September 1998

The following records were established during the competition:

Clean & Jerk	193 kg	Shujauddin Malik (PAK)	GR

== Results ==
Rank	Athlete	Nation	Group	Body weight	Snatch (kg)				Clean & Jerk (kg)				Total
Rank	Athlete	Nation	Group	Body weight	1	2	3	Result	1	2	3	Result	Total
1st place, gold medalist(s)	Shujauddin Malik	Pakistan	A	84.64	145	~~150~~	150	150	180	187	193	193	343
2nd place, silver medalist(s)	Brice Batchaya	Cameroon	A	84.13	141	146	151	151	171	180	~~186~~	180	331
3rd place, bronze medalist(s)	Simplice Ribouem	Cameroon	A	84.08	140	145	~~150~~	145	180	~~187~~	~~187~~	180	325
4	Satheesha Rai	India	A	83.90	140	144	146	146	176	~~185~~	~~186~~	176	322
5	Darryn Anthony	South Africa	A	84.11	~~140~~	~~140~~	140	140	~~170~~	170	~~180~~	170	310
6	Peter Kirkbride	Scotland	A	84.35	120	126	131	131	155	166	~~172~~	166	297
7	David Obiero	Kenya	A	84.85	111	113	~~115~~	113	141	145	150	150	263
8	Teataua Tiito	Kiribati	A	84.32	~~111~~	111	~~114~~	111	141	~~145~~	146	146	257
9	Abu-Bakarr Kabia	Sierra Leone	A	83.89	105	110	~~112~~	110	~~135~~	135	140	140	250
