= Weightlifting at the 2004 Summer Olympics – Men's 85 kg =

Olympics Weightlifting competition

Men's 85 kg at the Games of the XXVIII Olympiad
- Venue: Nikaia Olympic Weightlifting Hall
- Date: 21 August 2004
- Competitors: 21 from 19 nations

Medalists
1st place, gold medalist(s)		Giorgi Asanidze	Georgia
2nd place, silver medalist(s)		Andrei Rybakou	Belarus
3rd place, bronze medalist(s)		Pyrros Dimas	Greece

The men's 85 kilograms weightlifting event at the 2004 Summer Olympics in Athens, Greece took place at the Nikaia Olympic Weightlifting Hall on 21 August.

Total score was the sum of the lifter's best result in each of the snatch and the clean and jerk, with three lifts allowed for each lift. In case of a tie, the lighter lifter won; if still tied, the lifter who took the fewest attempts to achieve the total score won. Lifters without a valid snatch score did not perform the clean and jerk.

== Schedule ==
All times are Eastern European Summer Time (UTC+03:00)

Date	Time	Event
21 August 2004	10:30	Group B
21 August 2004	20:00	Group A

== Records ==
{{{caption}}}
World Record	Snatch	Andrei Rybakou (BLR)	182.5 kg	Havířov, Czech Republic	2 June 2002
World Record	Clean & Jerk	Zhang Yong (CHN)	218.0 kg	Ramat Gan, Israel	25 April 1998
World Record	Total	World Standard	395.0 kg	—	1 January 1998
Olympic Record	Snatch	Olympic Standard	180.0 kg	—	1 January 1997
Olympic Record	Clean & Jerk	Olympic Standard	215.0 kg	—	1 January 1997
Olympic Record	Total	Olympic Standard	392.5 kg	—	1 January 1997

== Results ==
Rank	Athlete	Group	Body weight	Snatch (kg)				Clean & Jerk (kg)				Total
Rank	Athlete	Group	Body weight	1	2	3	Result	1	2	3	Result	Total
1st place, gold medalist(s)	Giorgi Asanidze (GEO)	A	84.28	172.5	177.5	~~180.0~~	177.5	202.5	205.0	~~207.5~~	205.0	382.5
2nd place, silver medalist(s)	Andrei Rybakou (BLR)	B	84.58	175.0	180.0	~~183.0~~	180.0	195.0	200.0	~~202.5~~	200.0	380.0
3rd place, bronze medalist(s)	Pyrros Dimas (GRE)	A	83.15	170.0	~~175.0~~	175.0	175.0	202.5	~~205.0~~	~~207.5~~	202.5	377.5
4	Georgios Markoulas (GRE)	A	83.77	167.5	~~172.5~~	~~172.5~~	167.5	~~205.0~~	205.0	~~212.5~~	205.0	372.5
5	Yuan Aijun (CHN)	A	83.97	167.5	~~172.5~~	~~172.5~~	167.5	205.0	~~215.0~~	~~215.0~~	205.0	372.5
6	Aliaksandr Anishchanka (BLR)	A	83.69	~~170.0~~	~~170.0~~	170.0	170.0	200.0	~~210.0~~	~~210.0~~	200.0	370.0
7	Tigran Martirosyan (ARM)	A	82.02	~~162.5~~	162.5	167.5	167.5	~~200.0~~	200.0	~~210.0~~	200.0	367.5
8	Song Jong-shik (KOR)	A	84.21	160.0	~~165.0~~	~~165.0~~	160.0	~~200.0~~	~~200.0~~	200.0	200.0	360.0
9	Héctor Ballesteros (COL)	B	83.70	~~152.5~~	152.5	157.5	157.5	192.5	197.5	~~200.0~~	197.5	355.0
10	Oscar Chaplin (USA)	B	84.97	~~160.0~~	160.0	~~165.0~~	160.0	185.0	190.0	~~197.5~~	190.0	350.0
11	Ulanbek Moldodosov (KGZ)	B	83.65	~~150.0~~	150.0	~~160.0~~	150.0	175.0	185.0	192.5	192.5	342.5
12	Richard Scheer (SEY)	B	84.74	~~140.0~~	140.0	~~142.5~~	140.0	160.0	~~165.0~~	165.0	165.0	305.0
13	Meamea Thomas (KIR)	B	84.24	120.0	125.0	130.0	130.0	155.0	~~162.5~~	162.5	162.5	292.5
14	Julian McWatt (GUY)	B	84.69	115.0	120.0	125.0	125.0	140.0	147.5	~~155.0~~	147.5	272.5
—	Valeriu Calancea (ROM)	A	84.35	~~160.0~~	160.0	—	160.0	—	—	—	—	—
—	David Matam (FRA)	B	84.66	~~162.5~~	162.5	167.5	167.5	~~192.5~~	~~192.5~~	~~192.5~~	—	—
—	Zaur Takhushev (RUS)	A	84.29	~~175.0~~	~~175.0~~	~~175.0~~	—	—	—	—	—	—
—	Sergo Chakhoyan (AUS)	A	84.15	~~175.0~~	175.0	~~177.5~~	175.0	~~205.0~~	~~205.0~~	~~207.5~~	—	—
—	Hamza Abu-Ghalia (LBA)	B	84.52	142.5	147.5	~~152.5~~	147.5	~~180.0~~	~~180.0~~	~~180.0~~	—	—
—	İzzet İnce (TUR)	A	83.45	~~175.0~~	~~175.0~~	~~175.0~~	—	—	—	—	—	—
—	Chaehoi Fatihou (COM)	B	81.72	~~80.0~~	~~80.0~~	~~80.0~~	—	—	—	—	—	—
