= Edgar Gevorgyan =

Armenian weightlifter

Personal information
- Nationality: Armenia
- Born: 21 May 1982 (age 43); Vanadzor, Armenian SSR
- Height: 1.75 m (5 ft 9 in)
- Weight: 85 kg (187 lb)

Sport
- Sport: Weightlifting
- Event: 85 kg

Edgar Gevorgyan (Armenian: Էդգար Գևորգյան, born May 21, 1982, in Vanadzor, Armenian SSR) is an Armenian weightlifter. He competed at the 2008 Summer Olympics in the men's 85 kg division. Gevorgyan competed along with his compatriot Tigran Vardan Martirosyan, who eventually won the bronze medal. Gevorgyan successfully lifted 176 kg in the single-motion snatch, but did not finish the event, as he failed to hoist 196 kg in three attempts for the two-part, shoulder-to-overhead clean and jerk.
