= Weightlifting at the 2008 Summer Olympics – Men's 85 kg =

Men's 85 kg at the Games of the XXIX Olympiad
- Venue: Beihang University Gymnasium
- Date: 15 August 2008
- Competitors: 21 from 19 nations

Medalists
1st place, gold medalist(s)		Lu Yong	China
2nd place, silver medalist(s)		Tigran Martirosyan	Armenia
3rd place, bronze medalist(s)		Jadier Valladares	Cuba

The men's 85 kilograms weightlifting event was the fifth men's event at the weightlifting competition, limiting competitors to a maximum of 85 kilograms of body mass. The whole competition took place on August 15, but was divided in two parts due to the number of competitors. Group B weightlifters competed at 10:00, and Group A, at 19:00. This event was the seventh Weightlifting event to conclude.

Each lifter performed in both the snatch and clean and jerk lifts, with the final score being the sum of the lifter's best result in each. The athlete received three attempts in each of the two lifts; the score for the lift was the heaviest weight successfully lifted.

Tie-breaking rules determined the winner. Andrei Rybakou of Belarus it seemed set a world record. He lost out in the gold medal as Lu Yong of China tied this but weighed in slightly lighter – and per Olympic rules, the lighter lifter won. The record rules first meant the earliest lifter's mark counted as to record entries, but Rybakou's world (and Olympic) records were later annulled due to doping.

== Schedule ==
All times are China Standard Time (UTC+08:00)

Date	Time	Event
15 August 2008	10:00	Group B
15 August 2008	19:00	Group A

== Records ==
{{{caption}}}
World Record	Snatch	Andrei Rybakou (BLR)	187 kg	Chiang Mai, Thailand	22 September 2007
World Record	Clean & Jerk	Zhang Yong (CHN)	218 kg	Ramat Gan, Israel	25 April 1998
World Record	Total	Andrei Rybakou (BLR)	393 kg	Chiang Mai, Thailand	22 September 2007
Olympic Record	Snatch	Olympic Standard	180 kg	—	1 January 1997
Olympic Record	Clean & Jerk	Olympic Standard	215 kg	—	1 January 1997
Olympic Record	Total	Olympic Standard	392 kg	—	1 January 1997

== Results ==
Rank	Athlete	Group	Body weight	Snatch (kg)				Clean & Jerk (kg)				Total
Rank	Athlete	Group	Body weight	1	2	3	Result	1	2	3	Result	Total
1st place, gold medalist(s)	Lu Yong (CHN)	A	84.41	175	180	~~183~~	180	208	~~214~~	214	214	394
2nd place, silver medalist(s)	Tigran Martirosyan (ARM)	A	83.78	172	177	~~180~~	177	~~203~~	203	~~206~~	203	380
3rd place, bronze medalist(s)	Jadier Valladares (CUB)	A	84.84	161	166	169	169	~~198~~	198	203	203	372
4	Benjamin Hennequin (FRA)	A	84.55	157	~~162~~	162	162	196	201	205	205	367
5	Mansurbek Chashemov (UZB)	A	84.71	~~165~~	165	~~169~~	165	195	199	202	202	367
6	Kendrick Farris (USA)	B	84.14	153	157	160	160	~~195~~	195	202	202	362
7	Carlos Andica (COL)	B	84.62	155	~~160~~	~~160~~	155	190	195	201	201	356
8	Ulanbek Moldodosov (KGZ)	B	84.74	152	~~160~~	~~160~~	152	182	190	194	194	346
9	Ondrej Kutlík (SVK)	B	84.89	150	~~155~~	~~155~~	150	186	~~191~~	193	193	343
10	Benedict Uloko (NGR)	B	84.97	144	148	~~151~~	148	~~187~~	187	191	191	339
11	Brice Batchaya (CMR)	B	82.77	150	153	~~155~~	153	180	~~185~~	~~185~~	180	333
12	David Katoatau (KIR)	B	84.17	~~130~~	130	135	135	170	~~178~~	178	178	313
13	Terrence Dixie (SEY)	B	82.67	110	~~115~~	115	115	130	~~140~~	140	140	255
—	İzzet İnce (TUR)	A	84.29	~~165~~	165	170	170	~~190~~	—	—	—	—
—	Vadzim Straltsou (BLR)	A	84.37	~~170~~	—	—	—	—	—	—	—	—
—	Rauli Tsirekidze (GEO)	B	84.55	~~143~~	143	~~148~~	143	—	—	—	—	—
—	Herbys Márquez (VEN)	B	84.91	~~152~~	~~152~~	~~152~~	—	—	—	—	—	—
—	Edgar Gevorgyan (ARM)	A	84.69	~~170~~	170	176	176	~~196~~	~~196~~	~~196~~	—	—
DQ	Andrei Rybakou (BLR)	A	84.69	180	~~185~~	185	185	200	204	209	209	~~394~~
DQ	Vladimir Sedov (KAZ)	A	84.54	170	175	180	180	200	~~203~~	~~203~~	200	~~380~~
DQ	Intigam Zairov (AZE)	A	84.52	160	~~166~~	166	166	195	~~199~~	~~199~~	195	~~361~~

- Andrei Rybakou of Belarus originally finished second, but was disqualified after he tested positive for oral turinabol and stanozolol.
- Vladimir Sedov of Kazakhstan originally finished fourth, but was disqualified after he tested positive for stanozolol.
- Intigam Zairov of Azerbaijan originally finished ninth, but was disqualified after he tested positive for doping.

== New records ==
Snatch	~~185 kg~~	~~Andrei Rybakou (BLR)~~	~~OR~~
Total	~~394 kg~~ 394 kg	~~Andrei Rybakou (BLR)~~; Lu Yong (CHN)	~~WR~~; WR
