= Jean Lavertue =

Canadian weightlifter

Personal information
- Full name: Jean Lavertue
- Born: September 4, 1974 (age 52) Montreal, Quebec
- Height: 163 cm (5 ft 4 in)
- Weight: 84.98 kg (187.3 lb)

Sport
- Country: Canada
- Sport: Weightlifting
- Weight class: 85 kg
- Club: Sons Gadbois Club
- Team: National team
- Updated on 10 September 2016

Jean Lavertue (born September 4, 1974 in Montreal, Quebec) is a Canadian male weightlifter, competing in the 85 kg category and representing Canada at international competitions. He participated at the 1996 Summer Olympics in the 64 kg event. He competed at world championships, most recently at the 2006 World Weightlifting Championships.

== Major results ==
Year	Venue	Weight	Snatch (kg)				Clean & Jerk (kg)				Total	Rank
Year	Venue	Weight	1	2	3	Rank	1	2	3	Rank	Total	Rank
Summer Olympics
1996	Atlanta, United States	64 kg				—N/a				—N/a		28
World Championships
2006	Santo Domingo, Dominican Republic	85 kg	~~140~~	140	~~145~~	36	~~165~~	165	~~170~~	36	305.0	35
