= Intigam Zairov =

Azerbaijani weightlifter (born 1985)

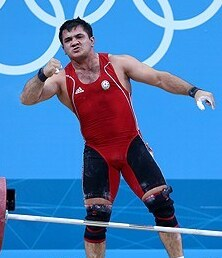
- Zairov in 2012 Summer Olympics

Personal information
- Born: 21 April 1985 (age 41) Baku, Azerbaijan
Medal record
Men's Weightlifting
Representing Azerbaijan
European Championships
Silver medal – second place	2009 Bucharest	–85 kg
Islamic Solidarity Games
Silver medal – second place	2013 Palembang	–94 kg

Intigam Zairov (born 21 April 1985 in Baku) is an Azerbaijani weightlifter he won silver medal at 2009 European Weightlifting Championships in Bucharest.

He competed for Azerbaijan at the 2008 in the Men's 85kg weightlifting event and the 2012 Summer Olympics in the Men's 94kg weightlifting event.

In 2016, he was disqualified from the Beijing 2008 Olympics following reanalysis of his samples from the 2008 Olympics, resulted in a positive test for the prohibited substance turinabol.

On 12 January 2017 it was announced that because of a doping violation he had been disqualified from the 2012 Olympic Games.

== Results ==
=== Olympics ===
1. Weightlifting at the 2008 Summer Olympics – Men's 85 kg - DQ
2. Weightlifting at the 2012 Summer Olympics – Men's 94 kg - DQ

=== World ===
1. 2006 World Weightlifting Championships – Men's 85 kg - 21st
2. 2007 World Weightlifting Championships – Men's 85 kg - 27th
3. 2009 World Weightlifting Championships – Men's 85 kg - 5th
4. 2010 World Weightlifting Championships – Men's 94 kg - 6th
5. 2011 World Weightlifting Championships – Men's 94 kg - 9th
6. 2015 World Weightlifting Championships – Men's 94 kg - DQ

=== Euro ===
1. 2008 European Weightlifting Championships - 7th
2. 2009 European Weightlifting Championships - 2nd
3. 2012 European Weightlifting Championships - NM
4. 2013 European Weightlifting Championships - DQ

=== Others ===
1. "London prepares" International invitational - 1st
2. 2013 IWF Grand Prix - President's Cup - DQ
