= Ulanbek Moldodosov =

Kyrgyzstani weightlifter (born 1976)

Personal information
- Nationality: Kyrgyzstan
- Born: 18 June 1976 (age 50) Frunze, Kirghiz SSR, Soviet Union
- Height: 1.72 m (5 ft 7 1/2 in)
- Weight: 85 kg (187 lb)

Sport
- Sport: Weightlifting
- Event: 85 kg
Medal record
Representing Kyrgyzstan
Men's weightlifting
Asian Championships
Gold medal – first place	2005 Dubai	85 kg
Silver medal – second place	2007 Tai'an	85 kg
Bronze medal – third place	2003 Qinhuangdao	77 kg
Bronze medal – third place	2008 Kanazawa	85 kg
Islamic Solidarity Games
Gold medal – first place	2005 Mecca	85 kg

Ulanbek Moldodosov (Russian: Уланбек Молдодосов; born June 18, 1976) is a Kyrgyzstani weightlifter. Moldodosov competed at the 2004 Summer Olympics in Athens, where he placed eleventh in the men's light heavyweight category (85 kg), with a total weight of 342.5 kg.

At the 2008 Summer Olympics in Beijing, Moldodosov competed for the second time in the men's 85 kg class. He repeated his eleventh-place position in this event, as he successfully lifted 152 kg in the single-motion snatch, and hoisted 194 kg in the two-part, shoulder-to-overhead clean and jerk, for a total of 347 kg.

== Major results ==
Year	Venue	Weight	Snatch (kg)					Clean & Jerk (kg)					Total	Rank
Year	Venue	Weight	1	2	3	Result	Rank	1	2	3	Result	Rank	Total	Rank
Representing Kyrgyzstan
Olympic Games
2008	Beijing, China	85 kg	152	~~160~~	~~160~~	152	11	182	190	194	194	8	346	8
2004	Athens, Greece	85 kg	~~150.0~~	150.0	~~160.0~~	150.0	14	175.0	185.0	192.5	192.5	10	342.5	11
World Championships
2007	Chiang Mai, Thailand	85 kg	150	157	~~160~~	157	18	180	187	188	188	19	345	18
2006	Santo Domingo, Dominican Republic	85 kg	~~150~~	~~150~~	150	150	19	~~181~~	181	190	190	16	340	16
1999	Athens, Greece	69 kg	130.0	135.0	137.5	137.5	22	155.0	162.5	165.0	165.0	30	302.5	26
Asian Games
2006	Doha, Qatar	85 kg	150	~~155~~	~~155~~	150	4	182	190	~~196~~	190	5	340	4
2002	Busan, South Korea	77 kg	~~152.5~~	152.5	~~160.0~~	152.5	4	182.5	190.0	~~192.5~~	190.0	4	342.5	4
Asian Championships
2008	Kanazawa, Japan	85 kg	150	158	~~162~~	158	3rd place, bronze medalist(s)	181	187	192	192	2nd place, silver medalist(s)	350	3rd place, bronze medalist(s)
2007	Tai'an, China	85 kg	—N/a	—N/a	—N/a	150	4	—N/a	—N/a	—N/a	187	2nd place, silver medalist(s)	337	2nd place, silver medalist(s)
2005	Dubai, United Arab Emirates	85 kg	—N/a	—N/a	—N/a	151	3rd place, bronze medalist(s)	—N/a	—N/a	—N/a	190	1st place, gold medalist(s)	341	1st place, gold medalist(s)
2004	Almaty, Kazakhstan	85 kg	—N/a	—N/a	—N/a	155.0	6	—N/a	—N/a	—N/a	190.0	4	345.0	5
2003	Qinhuangdao, China	77 kg	—N/a	—N/a	—N/a	152.5	4	—N/a	—N/a	—N/a	187.5	3rd place, bronze medalist(s)	340.0	3rd place, bronze medalist(s)
2000	Osaka, Japan	69 kg	—N/a	—N/a	—N/a	135.0	6	—N/a	—N/a	—N/a	157.5	11	292.5	8
1999	Wuhan, China	69 kg	—N/a	—N/a	—N/a	135.0	4	—N/a	—N/a	—N/a	155.0	7	290.0	5
