= Siarhei Lahun =

Belarusian weightlifter (1988–2011)

Medal record

Men's Weightlifting

Representing Belarus

World Championships
Silver medal – second place	2009 Goyang	– 85 kg
Bronze medal – third place	2010 Antalya	– 85 kg

Siarhei Lahun (May 27, 1988 – April 22, 2011) was a Belarusian weightlifter.

At the 2007 World Weightlifting Championships he ranked 10th in the 77 kg category, with a total of 342 kg.

He competed in Weightlifting at the 2008 Summer Olympics in the 77 kg division finishing tenth with 349 kg. This beat his previous personal best by 4 kg.

He died in a car crash on 23 April 2011. In this crash, the lifter Yauheni Zharnasek (BLR) also suffered severe injuries.

He was 5 ft 8 inches tall and weighed 88 kg (194 lb).

== Performance results ==
Year	Competition	Weight category	Snatch	Clean and jerk	Total	Place
2007	World Junior Weightlifting Championships	77 kg	155.0 kg	189.0 kg	344.0 kg	1
2007	World Weightlifting Championships	77 kg	152.0 kg	190.0 kg	342.0 kg	10
2008	Olympic Games	77 kg	157.0 kg	192.0 kg	349.0 kg	10
2009	World Weightlifting Championships	85 kg	171.0 kg	209.0 kg	380.0 kg	2
2010	World Weightlifting Championships	85 kg	166.0 kg	211.0 kg	377.0 kg	3
