= Aleksey Yufkin =

Russian weightlifter

Medal record

Men's Weightlifting

Representing Russia

World Championships
Silver medal – second place	2010 Antalya	– 85 kg

European Championships
Gold medal – first place	2009 Bucharest	– 85 kg
Gold medal – first place	2011 Kazan	– 85 kg
Bronze medal – third place	2008 Lignano Sabbiadoro	– 77 kg

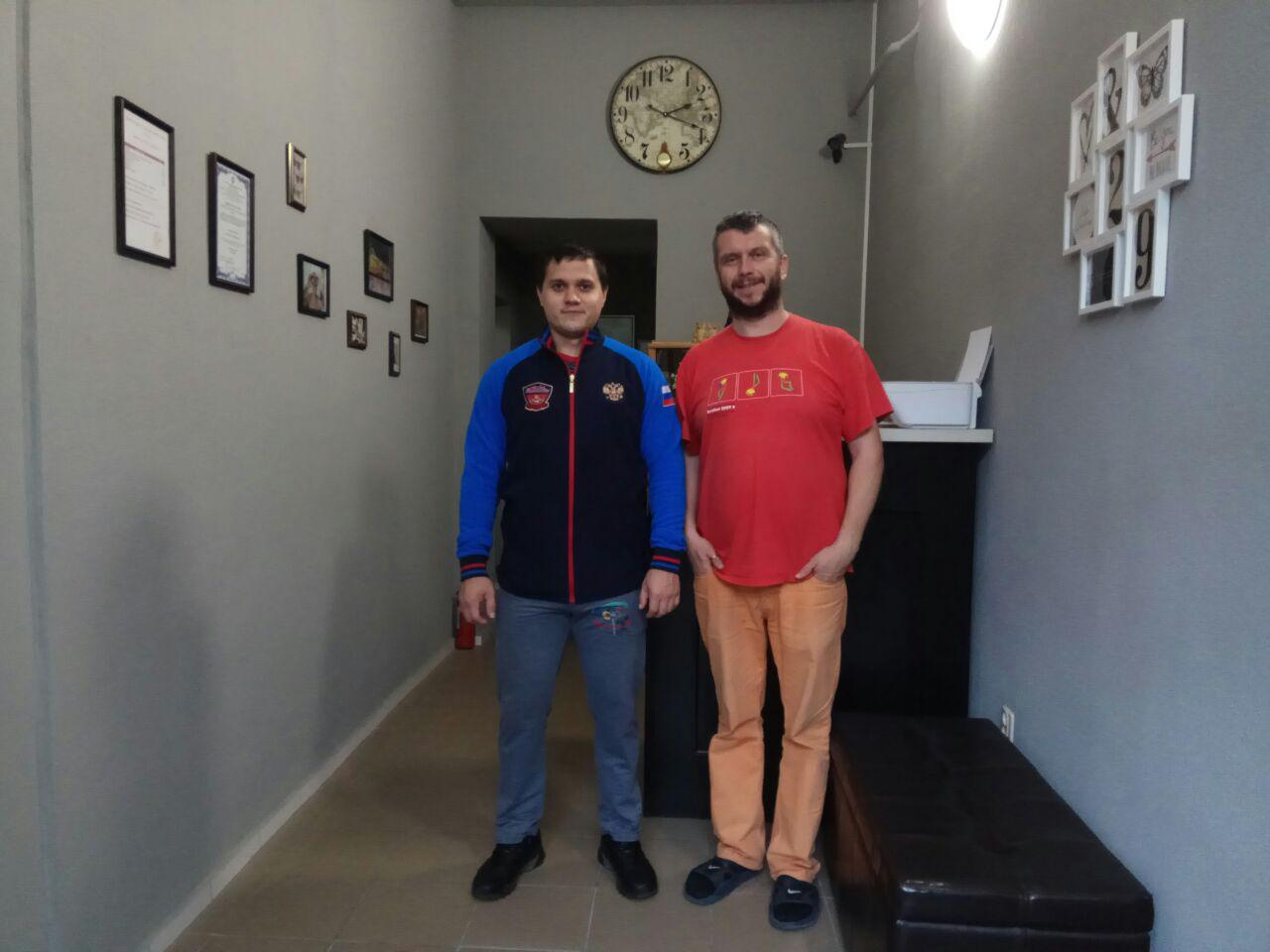

Aleksey Yufkin (Russian: Алексе́й Никола́евич Ю́фкин; born January 11, 1986) is a Russian weightlifter.
