= Gaber Mohamed =

Egyptian weightlifter (born 1985)

Personal information
- Full name: Gaber Ahmed Farhan Mohamed
- Nationality: Egyptian
- Born: 1 September 1985 (age 40)
- Height: 1.80 m (5 ft 11 in)
- Weight: 104.61 kg (231 lb)

Sport
- Country: Egypt
- Sport: Weightlifting
Medal record
Men's weightlifting
Representing Egypt
African Games
Gold medal – first place	2015 Brazzaville	105 kg
- Updated on 9 April 2017

Gaber Ahmed Farhan Mohamed (Arabic: جَابِر أَحْمَد فَرْحَان مُحَمَّد; born September 1, 1985), known as Gaber Mohamed, is an Egyptian male weightlifter, competing in the 105 kg category and representing Egypt at international competitions. He participated in the men's 105 kg event at the 2015 World Weightlifting Championships, and at the 2016 Summer Olympics, finishing in twelfth position. Mohamed also won the gold medal in the same weight category at the 2015 African Games.

== Major results ==
Year	Venue	Weight	Snatch (kg)				Clean & Jerk (kg)				Total	Rank
Year	Venue	Weight	1	2	3	Rank	1	2	3	Rank	Total	Rank
World Championships
2015	Houston, United States	105 kg	163	~~168~~	~~169~~	24	202	207	---	14	370	17
2006	Santo Domingo, Dominican Republic	85 kg	155	158	~~161~~	14	187	192	~~196~~	15	350.0	13
2003	Vancouver, Canada	77 kg	145	~~150~~	150	16	180	182.5	187.5	10	337.5	11
African Games
2015	(Republic of the Congo) Brazzaville, Congo	105 kg	160	167	172	1st place, gold medalist(s)	195	205	---	1st place, gold medalist(s)	377	1st place, gold medalist(s)
