= Richard Scheer =

French weightlifter

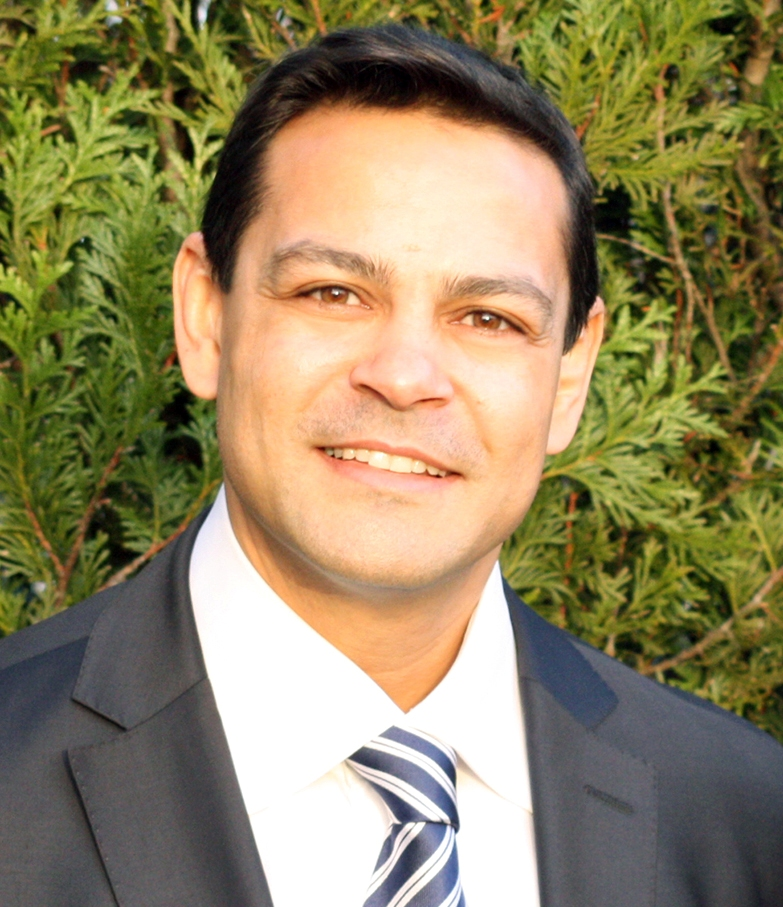
- Scheer in 2015

Personal information
- Nationality: Seychellois
- Born: 9 March 1974 (age 51)
- Height: 1.78 m (5 ft 10 in)
- Weight: 85 kg (187 lb)

Sport
- Sport: Weightlifting
- Event: Men's 85 kg

Richard Scheer (born 9 March 1974) is a Franco-Seychellois former weightlifter who competed in the sport for twenty years.

Richard was born in Victoria, the capital of Seychelles located on the island of Mahé, and moved to France with his family when he was six years old. Scheer began weightlifting when he was fourteen and later joined the National Institute of Sport and Physical Education where he remained for several years.

During his sporting career, Scheer won thirteen weightlifting titles and set twenty one national records for France; he a won further five medals whilst representing Seychelles in 2003 at the Indian Island Ocean Games and the African Games. After receiving a last minute invitation to participate in the 2004 Summer Olympics in Athens, Scheer competed in the men's 85 kg event where he finished in twelfth position having lifted a total weight of 305 kg

Upon retiring from competition in 2008, he became a journalist and spokesman for the French Weightlifting Federation. More recently, Richard has moved into French politics, campaigning for election in the canton of Cergy-2.
