= Ekrem Celil =

Turkish weightlifter (born 1980)

Personal information
- Nationality: Turkish
- Born: February 20, 1980 (age 46) Kardzhali, Bulgaria

Sport
- Country: Turkey
- Sport: Weightlifting
- Event(s): –69 kg, –77 kg
Medal record
European Championships
Gold medal – first place	2004 Kyiv	–69 kg
Bronze medal – third place	2003 Loutraki	–69 kg
Gold medal – first place	2001 Trenčín	–69 kg
Tournaments
Gold medal – first place	2011 Subotica	–77 kg

Ekrem Celil (born February 20, 1980, in Kardzhali, Bulgaria) is a Turkish European champion weightlifter competing in the –69 kg and –77 kg divisions.

Born in Bulgaria of Turkish descent, he started to perform weightlifting in a local club. Ekrem Celil immigrated in 1998 to Turkey in an action called as the "second Naim operation".

He was admitted in 2000 to the Turkish national team, which would take part at the Olympics in Sydney. However, the Bulgarian Federation vetoed his participation.

== Achievements ==
European Weightlifting Championships

Rank	Discipline	Snatch	Clean&Jerk	Total	Place	Date
Gold	–69 kg			+	Trenčín, SVK	2001
Silver	–69 kg		185.0		Loutraki, GRE	Apr 18, 2003
Bronze	–69 kg			325.0	Loutraki, GRE	Apr 18, 2003
Bronze	–69 kg	147.5			Kyiv, UKR	Apr 24, 2004
Gold	–69 kg		190.0		Kyiv, UKR	Apr 24, 2004
Gold	–69 kg			337.5	Kyiv, UKR	Apr 24, 2004

Mediterranean Games

Rank	Discipline	Snatch	Clean&Jerk	Total	Place	Date
Bronze	–69 kg	+			Almeria, ESP	2005
Gold	–69 kg		+		Almeria, ESP	2005

Tournaments

Rank	Discipline	Snatch	Clean&Jerk	Total	Place	Date
Gold	–77 kg	142.0	180.0	322.0	Subotica, SRB	Oct 8, 2011
