= Erdal Sunar =

Turkish weightlifter

Personal information
- Nationality: Turkish
- Born: 1 May 1982 (age 44) Kütahya, Turkey

Sport
- Country: Turkey
- Sport: Weightlifting
- Event: –85 kg
- Coached by: Hilmi Pekünlü
Medal record
European Championships
Bronze medal – third place	2004 Kyiv	–85 kg
World University Championships
Silver medal – second place	2004 Frederick	–85 kg}

Erdal Sunar (born 1 May 1982 in Kütahya, Turkey) is a Turkish weightlifter competing in the –85 kg division.

He studied physical education and sports at the Kütahya Dumlupınar University, and graduated in 2005. Erdal Sunar started with weightlifting in 1994, and is coached since then by Hilmi Pekünlü. In 1998, he was admitted to the national team.

He married in 2006 to Müslime, a French policewoman. A member of a Turkish family immigrated to France, she competes in the –63 kg division of women's weightlifting for France.

== Achievements ==
World Weightlifting Championships

Rank	Discipline	Snatch	Clean&Jerk	Total	Place	Date
Silver	–85 kg		172.5		Vancouver, CND	17 November 2003

European Weightlifting Championships

Rank	Discipline	Snatch	Clean&Jerk	Total	Place	Date
Bronze	–85 kg				Kyiv, UKR	2004

World University Championships

Rank	Discipline	Snatch	Clean&Jerk	Total	Place	Date
Gold	–85 kg	155.0			Frederick, USA	5 Jul 2004
Bronze	–85 kg		185.0		Frederick, USA	5 Jul 2004
Silver	–85 kg			340.0	Frederick, USA	5 Jul 2004
Silver	–94 kg	162.0			Komotini, GRE	27 Nov 2008

European Junior Championships

Rank	Discipline	Snatch	Clean&Jerk	Total	Place	Date
Silver	–77 kg	155.0			Kalmar, SWE	6 Sep 2001
