= Zaur Takhushev =

Russian weightlifter

Personal information
- Full name: Zaur Khazrailovich Takhushev
- Born: 1 June 1982 (age 44) Nartkala, Russia
- Height: 170 cm (5 ft 7 in)
- Weight: 84.29 kg (185.8 lb)

Sport
- Country: Russia
- Sport: Weightlifting
- Weight class: 85 kg
- Club: SDYuShOR
- Team: National team
- Updated on 10 October 2016

Zaur Khazrailovich Takhushev (Заур Хазраилович Тахушев, born 1 June 1982 in Nartkala) is a Russian male weightlifter, competing in the 85 kg category and representing Russia at international competitions. He participated at the 2004 Summer Olympics in the 85 kg event.

== Major results ==
(silver) - 2004 European Championships Light-Heavyweight class (377.5 kg)
(bronze) - 2006 European Championships Light-Heavyweight class (370.0 kg)

Year	Venue	Weight	Snatch (kg)				Clean & Jerk (kg)				Total (kg)	Rank
Year	Venue	Weight	1	2	3	Rank	1	2	3	Rank	Total (kg)	Rank
Summer Olympics
2004	Sydney, Australia	85 kg	0	0	0	—N/a	0	0	0	—N/a	0.0	---
