= Georgios Markoulas =

Greek weightlifter (born 1982)

Personal information
- Nationality: Greek
- Born: 16 November 1982 (age 42); Ioannina, Greece

Sport
- Sport: Weightlifting

Georgios Markoulas (born 16 November 1982) is a Greek weightlifter. He competed in the men's light heavyweight event at the 2004 Summer Olympics. and he was fourth.
