= Anatoliy Mushyk =

Ukrainian weightlifter

Personal information
- Nationality: Ukrainian
- Born: 11 August 1981 (age 44)
- Height: 1.82 m (6 ft 0 in)
- Weight: 94 kg (207 lb)

Sport
- Sport: Weightlifting
Medal record
Representing Ukraine
Men's Weightlifting
European Championships
Bronze medal – third place	2004 Kyiv	–94 kg

Anatoliy Mushyk (born 11 August 1981) is a Ukrainian weightlifter. He competed in the men's middle heavyweight event at the 2004 Summer Olympics.
