= Aslanbek Ediev =

Russian weightlifter (born 1970)

Personal information
- Nationality: Russia
- Born: 4 January 1970 (age 56)
- Weight: 84.18 kg (185.6 lb)

Sport
- Country: Russia
- Sport: Weightlifting
- Event: –85 kg
- Turned pro: 1993
- Retired: 2007
Medal record
World Championships
Silver medal – second place	2006 Santo Domingo	– 85 kg
Silver medal – second place	2007 Chiang Mai	– 85 kg
Bronze medal – third place	2005 Doha	– 85 kg
European Championships
Bronze medal – third place	2002 Antalya	– 85 kg

Aslambek Ediev (born 4 January 1970) is a former Russian weightlifter, who competed in the 76 kg division from 1993 to 1998 until the International Weightlifting Federation changed the body weight categories, and then 85 kg after 1998.

== Career ==
Ediev participated in the men's -85 kg class at the 2006 World Weightlifting Championships and won the silver medal, finishing behind Andrei Rybakou. He snatched 172 kg and jerked an additional 201 kg for a total of 373 kg, 10 kg behind winner Rybakou. in 2007 Ediev won silver medal with total of 372 kg behind Andrei Rybakou

== Major results ==
Year	Venue	Weight	Snatch (kg)				Clean & Jerk (kg)				Total	Rank
Year	Venue	Weight	1	2	3	Rank	1	2	3	Rank	Total	Rank
World Championships
1993	Melbourne, Australia	76 kg	157.5	~~162.5~~	~~162.5~~	6	~~187.5~~	~~187.5~~	—	—	—	—
2001	Antalya, Turkey	85 kg	167.5	~~172.5~~	~~172.5~~	7	195.0	~~200.0~~	200.0	8	367.5	7
2002	Warsaw, Poland	85 kg	170.0	~~175.0~~	~~175.0~~	7	~~202.5~~	~~202.5~~	~~202.5~~	—	—	—
2005	Doha, Qatar	85 kg	~~170~~	~~170~~	170	8	200	207	211	2nd place, silver medalist(s)	381	3rd place, bronze medalist(s)
2006	(Dominican Republic) Santo Domingo, Dominican Rep	85 kg	168	172	~~174~~	3rd place, bronze medalist(s)	~~195~~	195	201	3rd place, bronze medalist(s)	373	2nd place, silver medalist(s)
2007	Chiang Mai, Thailand	85 kg	168	~~172~~	172	2nd place, silver medalist(s)	200	~~205~~	~~205~~	4	372	2nd place, silver medalist(s)
