= Mansurbek Chashemov =

Uzbekistani weightlifter (born 1983)

Personal information
- Nationality: Uzbekistan
- Born: 22 June 1983 (age 43)
- Height: 1.74 m (5 ft 8 1/2 in)
- Weight: 83.99 kg (185.2 lb)

Sport
- Sport: Weightlifting
- Event: 85 kg

Mansurbek Chashemov (Uzbek: Мансурбек Чашемов; born June 22, 1983) is an Uzbekistani weightlifter. He represented Uzbekistan at the 2008 Summer Olympics in Beijing, where he placed seventh in the men's light heavyweight category (85 kg), with a snatch of 165 kg, and a clean and jerk of 202 kg, for a total of 367 kg.

== Major results ==
Year	Venue	Weight	Snatch (kg)				Clean & Jerk (kg)				Total	Rank
Year	Venue	Weight	1	2	3	Rank	1	2	3	Rank	Total	Rank
World Championships
2010	Antalya, Turkey	85 kg	165	169	~~172~~	5	200	~~206~~	~~206~~	9	369	6
2009	Goyang, South Korea	85 kg	~~160~~	---	---	---	~~200~~	---	---	---	0	---
2007	Chiang Mai, Thailand	85 kg	~~166~~	168	~~172~~	6	195	~~200~~	~~202~~	9	363	7
2006	Santo Domingo, Dominican Republic	85 kg	130	~~133~~	---	39	---	---	---	---	0.0	---
