= Shujauddin Malik =

Pakistani weightlifter (born 1972)

Shuja Ud Din Malik
Personal information
- Full name: Shuja Ud Din Malik
- Born: 29 February 1972 (age 54) Gujranwala, Punjab, Pakistan

Sport
- Country: Pakistan
- Sport: Weightlifting
- Event: 85 kg
Medal record
Men's Weightlifting
Representing Pakistan
Commonwealth Games
Gold medal – first place	2006 Melbourne	85 kg
South Asian Games
Gold medal – first place	2004 Islamabad	85 kg
Gold medal – first place	2006 Colombo	94 kg

Shuja Ud Din Malik (born 29 February 1972) is a weightlifter from Pakistan. A National Champion from 1990 to 2005, he has created 70 records in different body weight categories. He holds the national records in the 77 Kg and 85 Kg weight categories. He has also been a two-time gold medallist at South Asian Games. He represented Pakistan in several international competitions. He won Pakistan's first ever Commonwealth Games weightlifting gold medal in the men's 85 kg event and created a Commonwealth Games record in the 85 kg category, having lifted 193 kg in the clean and jerk event at the 2006 Commonwealth Games in Melbourne.

He is the cousin of Pakistani weightlifter Sajjad Amin Malik.

== Career ==
=== Commonwealth Games ===
==== 2006 Commonwealth Games ====
Malik won Pakistan's 1st Gold medal at the 2006 Commonwealth Games in Melbourne, Australia, winning the 85 kg category.

==== 2010 Commonwealth Games ====
Malik was chosen as the flag bearer for Pakistan at the opening ceremony. However, at the last minute as the teams were entering the stadium, chef de mission, Dr. Mohammad Ali Shah insisted on carrying the flag himself. According to the weightlifting team's manager, Rashid Mehmood, the team had considered a boycott in protest at the actions of the official but later withdrew their threat after Pakistan Olympic Association chief, Arif Hasan, assured them Shah would be sanctioned for his actions. Prime Minister, Yousuf Raza Gilani ordered an inquiry into the incident.

== Awards ==
Ribbon	Decoration	Country	Year
	Tamgha-e-Imtiaz	Pakistan	2006

Malik was awarded the Tamgha-e-Imtiaz for his achievements and service to sports.
