= Nicole Rubanovich =

Israeli weightlifter (born 1998)

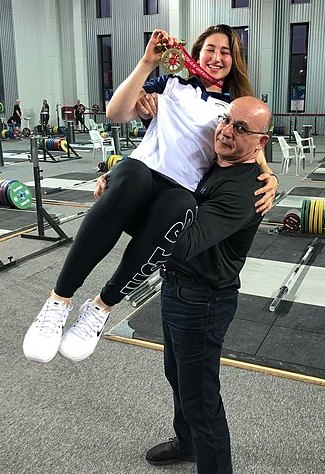

Personal information
- Native name: ניקול בלה רובנוביץ'
- Full name: Nicole Bella Rubanovich
- Born: 9 May 1998 (age 28) Beersheba, Israel

Sport
- Country: Israel
- Sport: Weightlifting
- Club: PowerClub Raanana
- Coached by: Igor Shalnov
Medal record
European Championships
Silver medal – second place	2024 Sofia	‍–‍76 kg
Bronze medal – third place	2023 Yerevan	‍–‍76 kg
Bronze medal – third place	2019 Batumi	‍–‍71 kg

Nicole Bella Rubanovich (Hebrew: ניקול בלה רובנוביץ'; born 9 May 1998, in Beersheba) is an Israeli weightlifter. First ever Israeli woman to win an international medals at olympic weightlifting. She won a bronze medal at the 2019 European Weightlifting Championships in the 71 kg category, a bronze medal at the 2023 European Weightlifting Championships in the 76 kg category, a silver medal at the 2024 European Weightlifting Championships in the 76 kg category.

At the 2021 European Junior & U23 Weightlifting Championships in Rovaniemi, Finland, Rubanovich won the gold medal in her event.
