= Brice Batchaya =

Cameroonian weightlifter

Personal information
- Full name: Brice Vivien Batchaya Ketchanke
- Nationality: Cameroon
- Born: 16 August 1985 (age 40)
- Height: 1.72 m (5 ft 7 1/2 in)
- Weight: 85 kg (187 lb)

Sport
- Sport: Weightlifting
- Event: 85 kg

Brice Vivien Batchaya Ketchanke (born August 16, 1985) is a Cameroonian weightlifter. Batchaya represented Cameroon at the 2008 Summer Olympics in Beijing, where he competed for the men's light heavyweight class (85 kg). Batchaya placed fourteenth in this event, as he successfully lifted 153 kg in the single-motion snatch, and hoisted 180 kg in the two-part, shoulder-to-overhead clean and jerk, for a total of 333 kg.
