= Paul Dumais =

Canadian weightlifter

Personal information
- Full name: Paul Dumais
- Born: 8 March 1991 (age 35)
- Weight: 84.14 kg (185.5 lb)

Sport
- Country: Canada
- Sport: Weightlifting
- Team: National team
- Updated on 6 September 2016

Paul Dumais (born 8 March 1991) is a Canadian male weightlifter, competing in the 85 kg category and representing Canada at international competitions. He competed at world championships, most recently at the 2011 World Weightlifting Championships.

== Major results ==
Year	Venue	Weight	Snatch (kg)				Clean & Jerk (kg)				Total	Rank
Year	Venue	Weight	1	2	3	Rank	1	2	3	Rank	Total	Rank
World Championships
2011	Paris, France	85 kg	140	~~144~~	~~146~~	31	165	169	172	30	312	30
