= Vladimir Kuznetsov (weightlifter, born 1984) =

Kazakhstani weightlifter

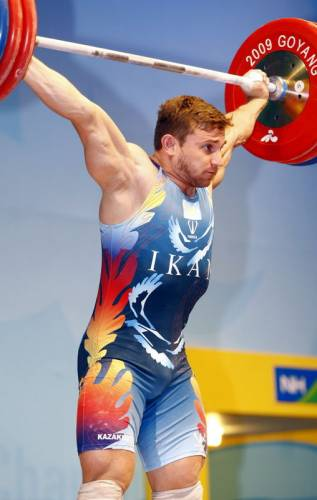
Kuznetsov in 2014

Vladimir Kuznetsov (born April 21, 1984) is a Kazakhstani weightlifter.

At the 2006 World Championships he ranked 14th in the 77 kg category, with a total of 330 kg. At the 2007 World Championships he ranked 9th in the 77 kg category, with a total of 345 kg.

He competed in Weightlifting at the 2008 Summer Olympics in the 77 kg division finishing ninth with 351 kg. This beat his previous personal best by 6 kg.

He is 5 ft 7 inches tall and weighs 172 lb.
