= Abbas Al-Qaisoum =

Saudi Arabian weightlifter (born 1980)

Abbas Al-Qaisoum (Arabic: عباس القيصوم; born 31 October 1980 in Qatif, Saudi Arabia) is a Saudi Arabian weightlifter. He competed for Saudi Arabia at the 2012 Summer Olympics where he placed 15th in the 94 kg group B.
