= Ondrej Kutlík =

Slovak weightlifter

Personal information
- Nationality: Slovakia
- Born: 9 September 1976 (age 49) Námestovo, Žilina, Czechoslovakia
- Weight: 85 kg (187 lb)

Sport
- Sport: Weightlifting
- Event: 85 kg
- Club: Diana Orol Ružomberok

Ondrej Kutlík (born September 9, 1976 in Námestovo, Žilina) is a Slovak weightlifter. Kutlik represented Slovakia at the 2008 Summer Olympics in Beijing, where he competed for the men's light heavyweight class (85 kg). Kutlik placed twelfth in this event, as he successfully lifted 150 kg in the single-motion snatch, and hoisted 193 kg in the two-part, shoulder-to-overhead clean and jerk, for a total of 343 kg.
