= Lu Yong =

Chinese weightlifter (born 1986)

Personal information
- Nationality: Chinese
- Born: January 1, 1986 (age 40) Liuzhou, Guangxi, China
- Height: 1.75 m (5 ft 9 in)
- Weight: 85 kg (187 lb)

Sport
- Country: China
- Sport: Olympic Weightlifting
- Event: -85 kg
Medal record
Men's Weightlifting
Olympic Games
Gold medal – first place	2008 Beijing	-85 kg
World Championships
Gold medal – first place	2009 Goyang	-85 kg
Silver medal – second place	2005 Doha	-85 kg
Asian Games
Gold medal – first place	2010 Guangzhou	-85 kg
Silver medal – second place	2006 Doha	-85 kg
- Updated on 17 April 2013

Lu Yong (simplified Chinese: 陆永; traditional Chinese: 陸永; pinyin: Lù Yǒng, born January 1, 1986, in Liuzhou, Guangxi) is a male Chinese weightlifter of Dong ethnicity and Olympic gold medalist. He is 172 cm tall.

In the 85 kg category, Lu won the silver medal in the World Championships in 2005 but placed sixth in the World Championships in 2007 due to a sprain injury during the competition.

He qualified for the 85 kg division finals, and subsequently won gold at the event at the 2008 Summer Olympics. Lu Yong had a 180 kg Snatch and 214 kg Clean and Jerk for an overall total of 394 kg. Andrei Rybakou (BLR) also finished with an overall 394 kg but since Lu Yong weighed in at 84.41 kg and Andrei 84.69, Lu Yong took the gold medal. This was a huge victory for Lu Yong because Andrei had earlier set a snatch record of 185 kg. Originally, Lu Yong clean and jerked 214 on his second lift but it was overruled and he had to resort to his third and last lift to succeed and win the gold.

His next major international gold medal victory took place in the 85 kg event at the 2009 World Weightlifting Championships in Goyang, South Korea, followed by his first Asian Games gold medal in Guangzhou in 2010.

== Major results ==
Year	Venue	Weight	Snatch (kg)				Clean & Jerk (kg)				Total	Rank
Year	Venue	Weight	1	2	3	Rank	1	2	3	Rank	Total	Rank
Olympic Games
2008	Beijing, China	85 kg	175	180	~~183~~	2	208	~~214~~	214	1	394WR	1st place, gold medalist(s)
2012	(United Kingdom) London, England	85 kg	175	178	~~180~~	1	~~205~~	~~205~~	~~205~~	-	-	-
World Championships
2005	Doha, Qatar	85 kg	165	170	175	4	200	205	210	2nd place, silver medalist(s)	385	2nd place, silver medalist(s)
2007	Chiang Mai, Thailand	85 kg	168	~~173~~	~~173~~	5	195	~~203~~	~~205~~	8	363	6
2009	Goyang, South Korea	85 kg	170	175	~~177~~	1st place, gold medalist(s)	206	208	~~211~~	2nd place, silver medalist(s)	383	1st place, gold medalist(s)
2010	Antalya, Turkey	85 kg	170	~~175~~	~~175~~	4	202	-	-	6	372	5
2011	Paris, France	85 kg	170	~~175~~	~~175~~	5	~~205~~	~~205~~	~~205~~	-	-	-
Asian Games
2006	Doha, Qatar	85 kg	162	167	~~170~~	2	195	202	~~211~~	2	369	2nd place, silver medalist(s)
2010	Guangzhou China	85 kg	~~170~~	170	173	1	201	203	—	1	376	1st place, gold medalist(s)
Asian Championships
2011	Tongling, China	85 kg	165	170	173	1st place, gold medalist(s)	200	205	212	1st place, gold medalist(s)	385	1st place, gold medalist(s)

== See also ==
- China at the 2012 Summer Olympics
