= Tigran Vardan Martirosyan =

Armenian weightlifter

Tigran Martirosyan
Personal information
- Native name: Տիգրան Գ. Մարտիրոսյան
- Born: Tigran Vardan Martirosyan; 3 March 1983 (age 43) Leninakan, Armenian SSR
- Height: 175 cm (5 ft 9 in)

Sport
- Sport: Weightlifting
Medal record
Representing Armenia
Men's Weightlifting
Olympic Games
Silver medal – second place	2008 Beijing	-85 kg
World Championships
Bronze medal – third place	2006 Santo Domingo	-85 kg
European Championships
Gold medal – first place	2008 Lignano Sabbiadoro	-85 kg

Tigran Vardan Martirosyan (Armenian: Տիգրան Գ. Մարտիրոսյան, born 3 March 1983 in Leninakan, Armenian SSR) is an Armenian weightlifter. He is 175 cm tall. Martirosyan was awarded the Honored Master of Sports of Armenia title in 2009.

== Biography ==
Tigran Martirosyan began weight training in 1995 under the guidance of Vahan Bichakhchyan. Martirosyan became a three-time consecutive European Champion during his youth career in 1997, 1998 and 1999. He began performing in adult competitions in the light heavyweight division (82.5 kg) after 2003.

Martirosyan competed at the 2004 Summer Olympics in Athens and came in seventh place with a total of 367.5 kg.

Martirosyan won a bronze medal at the 2006 World Weightlifting Championships in Santo Domingo, finishing behind Andrei Rybakou and Aslambek Ediev. He snatched 172 kg and jerked an additional 198 kg for a total of 370 kg, 13 kg behind winner Rybakou.

Before the 2007 European Weightlifting Championships in Strasbourg, Martirosyan received a serious injury that would not only not allow him to partake at this event, but also to prepare for the 2007 World Weightlifting Championships in Chiang Mai, where he was only able to come in tenth place.

The following year, Martirosyan won a gold medal at the 2008 European Weightlifting Championships in Lignano. He dedicated his victory to fellow Armenian weightlifter and later weightlifting coach Khachatur Kyapanaktsyan, who died in a car crash a few months earlier.

Martirosyan returned to the Olympics at the 2008 Summer Olympics in Beijing. He lifted 177 kg in the snatch, 203 kg in the clean & jerk and 380 kg in the total. He won an Olympic silver medal. Martirosyan came behind Lu Yong, who each totaled the current world record of 394 kg.

Martirosyan won a silver medal in the snatch at the 2009 World Weightlifting Championships in Goyang, but had to withdraw from the competition afterward due to a back pain.

Following an unsuccessful performance at the 2010 World Weightlifting Championships, Martirosyan left the Armenian national weightlifting team.
