= İzzet İnce =

Turkish weightlifter (born 1981)

Personal information
- Nationality: Turkish
- Born: July 8, 1981 (age 45) Kütahya, Turkey
- Height: 1.72 m (5 ft 8 in)

Sport
- Country: Turkey
- Sport: Weightlifting
- Event: –85 kg
Medal record
European Championships
Gold medal – first place	2004 Kyiv	–85 kg
Silver medal – second place	2007 Strasbourg	–85 kg

İzzet İnce (born June 28, 1981, in Kütahya) is a Turkish weightlifter competing in the –85 kg division. He is 1.72 m (5 ft 8 in) tall.

He participated at the 2004 Summer Olympics in Athens, Greece and at the 2008 Summer Olympics in Beijing, China without achieving a podium result. In Beijing, his right leg was injured during his attempt to lift 190.0 kg by clean and jerk after having successfully finished the snatch session with 170.0 kg.

He won the 2004 European Weightlifting Championships held in Kyiv, Ukraine. Also, he won the silver medal at the 2007 European Weightlifting Championships held in Strasbourg, France.

== Medals ==
European Championships
Rank	Discipline	Snatch	Clean&Jerk	Total	Place	Date
Gold	–85 kg	172.0			Strasbourg, FRA	Apr 14–22, 2007
Silver	–85 kg		201.0		Strasbourg, FRA	Apr 14–22, 2007
Silver	–85 kg			373.0	Strasbourg, FRA	Apr 14–22, 2007
Silver	–85 kg	170.0			Minsk, BLR	Apr 2–11, 2010

Mediterranean Games
Rank	Discipline	Snatch	Clean&Jerk	Total	Place	Date
Gold	–85 kg	167.0			Pescara, ITA	June 25-July 5, 2009
