= Andrei Rybakou =

Belarusian weightlifter

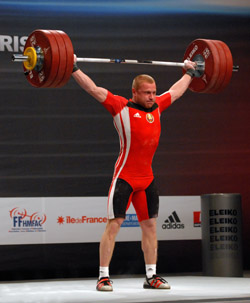
- Rybakou in November 2011

Personal information
- Nationality: Belarus
- Born: 4 March 1982 (age 44) Mogilev, Byelorussian SSR, Soviet Union
- Height: 1.72 m (5 ft 8 in)
- Weight: 85 kg (187 lb)

Sport
- Country: Belarus
- Sport: Weightlifting
- Event: –85 kg
Medal record
Representing Belarus
Olympic Games
Silver medal – second place	2004 Athens	-85 kg
Disqualified	2008 Beijing	-85 kg
World Championships
Gold medal – first place	2006 Santo Domingo	-85 kg
Gold medal – first place	2007 Chiang Mai	-85 kg
European Championships
Gold medal – first place	2006 Władysławowo	-85 kg

Andrei Rybakou (Belarusian: Андрэй Анатолевіч Рыбакоў) (born March 4, 1982) is a Belarusian former weightlifter, Olympian and two-time World Champion who competed in the 85 kg category. In 2016, after a retest of his 2008 samples tested positive for Dehydrochloromethyl-testosterone and Stanozolol his performance at the 2008 Olympic Games was disqualified, as well as his Olympic record and World record set during the competition. He was also ordered to return his silver medal.

== Career ==
=== Olympics ===
In 2004 Rybakou made his Olympic debut at the 2004 Summer Olympics, where he competed in the 85 kg category. During the snatch portion, after making a 180.0 kg lift, he attempted a new world record lift of 183.0 kg, he did not make the lift as the clock ran out on him, but as he was competing in the B category he had a 12.5 kg lead over the net closest competitor. During the clean & jerk portion of the competition his last successful lift of 200.0 kg gave him a total of 380.0 kg which led the second place competitor in the B group by 25.0 kg. It was not until Giorgi Asanidze's first clean & jerk of 202.5 kg in the A session that Rybakou was bumped from the gold medal position. Giorgi Asanidze ended up becoming Olympic Champion and Rybakou was awarded the silver medal.

Following his silver medal finish in 2004, two World Weightlifting Championships wins in 2006 and 2007, and after setting 4 world records, he was a favorite to win gold at the 2008 Summer Olympics. In the snatch portion he set a new Olympic Record lift of 185 kg, giving him a 5 kg lead over Lu Yong. In the clean and jerk aspect, he made all three lifts finishing with a 209 kg clean & jerk, setting a new world record total of 394 kg. Lu Yong attempted, and initially made a 214 kg clean & jerk on his second attempt before the jury overruled the results and that lift was declared a no lift, in his third attempt Lu made the 214 kg lift. As Lu weighed 0.28 kg less, he was awarded the gold medal, and Rybakou was again the silver medalist. In 2016, after a retest of his 2008 samples tested positive for Dehydrochloromethyl-testosterone and Stanozolol his performance at the 2008 Olympic Games was disqualified, as well as his Olympic record and World record set during the competition. He was also ordered to return his silver medal.

In 2012 he competed at the 2012 Summer Olympics in the 85 kg category, but was unable to complete a snatch, because of this he could not compete in the clean & jerk portion of the competition which resulted in a DNF.

=== Other Championships ===
In April 2006, he won the European Championship. Later that year, during the 2006 World Weightlifting Championships he was crowned as the World Champion in the 85 kg category.

He won the gold medal in the 85 kg category again at the 2007 World Weightlifting Championships, setting a world record with a 187 kg snatch.

== Major results ==
Year	Venue	Weight	Snatch (kg)				Clean & Jerk (kg)				Total	Rank
Year	Venue	Weight	1	2	3	Rank	1	2	3	Rank	Total	Rank
Olympic Games
2004	Athens, Greece	85 kg	175.0	180.0	~~183.0~~	1	195.0	200.0	~~202.5~~	7	380.0	2nd place, silver medalist(s)
2008	Beijing, China	85 kg	180	~~185~~	185	—	200	204	209	—	—	DSQ
2012	London, United Kingdom	85 kg	~~175~~	~~180~~	~~180~~	—	—	—	—	—	—	—
World Championships
2003	Vancouver, Canada	94 kg	~~172.5~~	~~172.5~~	~~172.5~~	—	—	—	—	—	—	—
2005	Doha, Qatar	85 kg	180	183 WR	185 WR	1st place, gold medalist(s)	195	~~200~~	~~200~~	12	380	5
2006	(Dominican Republic) Santo Domingo, Dominican Rep	85 kg	180	~~187~~	~~187~~	1st place, gold medalist(s)	200	203	~~210~~	1st place, gold medalist(s)	383	1st place, gold medalist(s)
2007	Chiang Mai, Thailand	85 kg	180	185	187 WR	1st place, gold medalist(s)	200	206	~~209~~	1st place, gold medalist(s)	393 WR^{[a]}	1st place, gold medalist(s)
2011	Paris, France	85 kg	170	175	178	1st place, gold medalist(s)	182	190	~~195~~	18	368	7
2013	Wrocław, Poland	85 kg	175	~~179~~	179	1st place, gold medalist(s)	~~194~~	194	~~200~~	7	373	6
2014	Almaty, Kazakhstan	85 kg	~~175~~	175	~~179~~	3rd place, bronze medalist(s)	182	~~191~~	191	19	366	8
European Championships
2003	Loutraki, Greece	85 kg	175.0	~~180.0~~	180.0	1st place, gold medalist(s)	~~190.0~~	190.0	~~197.5~~	10	370.0	6
2004	Kyiv, Ukraine	85 kg	~~175.0~~	175.0	~~180.0~~	3rd place, bronze medalist(s)	190.0	~~197.5~~	~~197.5~~	17	365.0	8
2006	Władysławowo, Poland	85 kg	180	~~186~~	186 WR	1st place, gold medalist(s)	195	200	206	1st place, gold medalist(s)	392	1st place, gold medalist(s)

== Notes ==
- ^{a} Not a world record at the time of the competition, became a world record when IWF decided to eliminate the world standards from the list of World Records on 24 June 2008.
