= Mansur Rejepow =

Turkmenistan weightlifter

Mansur Rejepov (born 3 January 1982 in Daşoguz) is a Turkmen weightlifter competing in the 85 kg category. He competed at the 2012 Summer Olympics.
