= Weightlifting in Armenia =

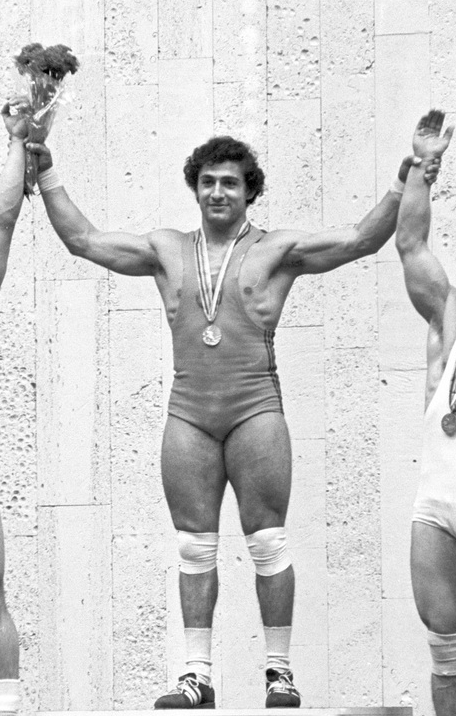
Olympic and World champion Yurik Vardanyan is considered the greatest Armenian weightlifter of all time.

Weightlifting was introduced to Armenia in the late 1920s and became widely practiced after World War II. Today, it is one of the country's most popular sports. The sport is regulated by the Armenian Weightlifting Federation. The first weightlifters from Soviet Armenia made successful appearances on the international stage in the 1970s. Vardan Militosyan won a silver at the 1976 Olympics, and later Yurik Vardanyan became an Olympic, World and European champion through the late 1970s and the early 1980s. Oksen Mirzoyan and Yurik Sarkisyan rose to top positions in the 1980s. After its independence from the Soviet Union, Armenia successfully held its weightlifting traditions and continues to be one of the strongest nations in Europe. In 2008, the Armenia team placed first at the European Championship. In the 2008 Summer Olympics Armenia won three bronze medals. Tigran Gevorg Martirosyan is Armenia's only world champion with his successful appearance in 2010.

Armenia's second largest city of Gyumri with a population of about 150,000, is well known for producing many prominent weightlifters, such as World and European weightlifting champions Yurik Vardanyan, Israel Militosyan, Gevorg Davtyan, Tigran G. Martirosyan and Nazik Avdalyan.

== Name ==
Weightlifting is known in Armenian as either ծանրամարտ tsanramart, composed of ծանր tsanr "heavy" and մարտ mart "fight" or ծանր աթլետիկա tsanr at'letika literally "heavy athletics" (via Russian тяжёлая атлетика).

== History ==
The origins of weight lifting trace back to ancient history, most notably Ancient Greece. Modern weightlifting, however, is relatively new and was mainly organized and institutionalized in Europe and North America in the late 19th century. The current International Weightlifting Federation (IWF) was established in 1920. Weightlifting has been in all Summer Olympic Games except 1900, 1908 and 1912.

Oksen Mirzoyan (left, standing), Yurik Vardanyan (middle right) and Yurik Sarkisyan (far right) are among the best-known Armenian weightlifters of the 1970–80s

=== Soviet period ===
Weightlifting was introduced to Armenia in the first decade of Soviet rule in Armenia. In 1927, a weightlifting club was established in the Armenian Sport Committee. In 1928, the first weightlifting championship was held in Yerevan and the first Armenian weightlifters participated in the Transcacucasian and later in Soviet championship. In 1947, the first Armenian weightlifter competed in a European championship.

During the Cold War, the Soviet Union was, by far, the strongest nation in the world in the sport of weightlifting and Armenian athletes made a significant contribution to this.

By 1979, there were 205 weightlifting clubs in Soviet Armenia with around 5,200 people training in them. By the 1970s Armenian weightlifters began to play an important role in the Soviet Union's weightlifting program. The first Olympic medalist from the Armenian SSR was Vardan Militosyan, who won a silver medal at the 1976 Summer Olympics.

Yurik Vardanyan became the first weightlifter from Armenia to win a gold medal in weightlifting at the 1980 Summer Olympics. In a dominant performance, Vardanyan became the first ever light-heavyweight (82.5 kg) to lift a total of 400 kg in an official competition, shattering both the Olympic and world records. By contrast, middle-heavyweight gold medalist Peter Baczako (90 kg) totaled 377.5 kg and sub-heavyweight gold medalist Ota Zaremba (100 kg) totaled 395 kg. Vardanyan set the division record for a final time at the 1984 Friendship Games, an alternative to the Soviet-boycotted 1984 Summer Olympics, lifting a total of 405 kg. Vardanyan's achievements have not been matched since, as the current light-heavyweight record for the now 85 kg light heavyweight category (not including records set before the weight limit change) is currently 394 kg, set by Andrei Rybakou at the 2008 Summer Olympics. Vardanyan set 41 world records during his decorated career. For his accomplishments, Vardanyan earned the title Honoured Master of Sports of the USSR in 1977 and was awarded the Order of Lenin in 1985. In 1994 he was elected a member of the International Weightlifting Federation Hall of Fame.

To this day, Vardanyan is still seen as a hero in Armenia for his accomplishments in the sport of weightlifting. A stamp of Vardanyan was printed in 2010 in honor of him.

Along with Vardanyan, other significant Armenian weightlifters of the 1980s included 1980 Olympic silver medalist Yurik Sarkisyan, who set 12 world records during his career, and 1988 Olympic gold medalist Oksen Mirzoyan, who set also set 12 world records during his career.

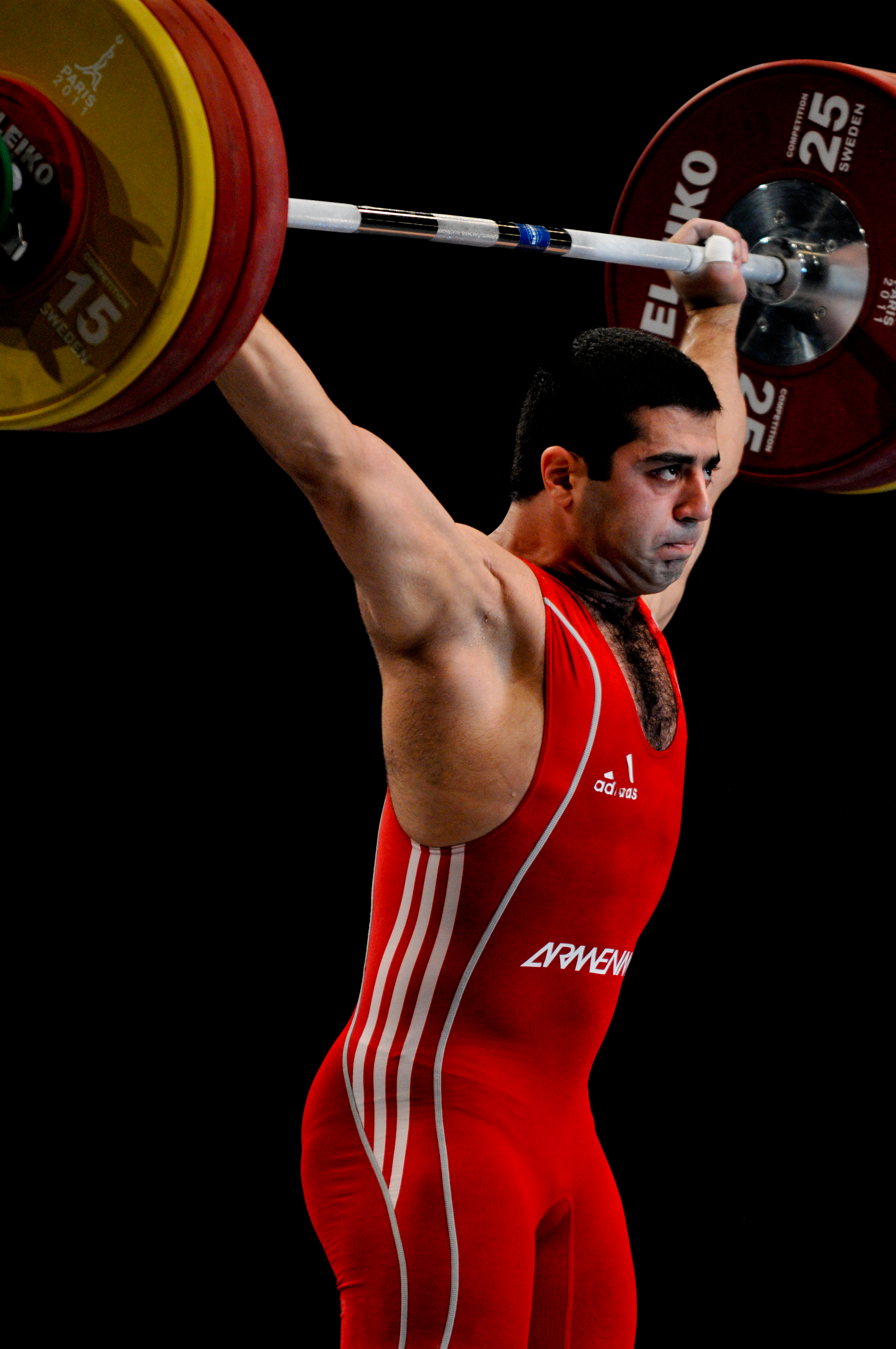
Tigran Gevorg Martirosyan is a World and European champion and an Olympic bronze medalist

At the 1992 Summer Olympics, Israel Militosyan, who previously won a silver medal at the 1988 Olympics, won a gold medal in the same division. Militosyan is, to this day, the final Armenian to win an Olympic gold medal. The 1992 Olympics signaled the end of Soviet weightlifting.

=== Independent Armenia ===
Armenia has so far set four world records in weightlifting, all in the snatch. Khachatur Kyapanaktsyan set two of them. Sergo Chakhoyan set another. Militosyan, who set a snatch world record twice in 1989 under the Soviet Union, set the record again in 1994 for Armenia.

Aghvan Grigoryan, who became the first Armenian Olympian to bear the flag of Armenia at the Summer Olympics in 1996, was a weightlifter. Arsen Melikyan became the first Armenian weightlifter for the independent Armenia to win an Olympic medal, having won a bronze medal at the 2000 Summer Olympics.

Weightlifters in Armenia
Year	Number
2005	2,543
2010	2,352
2021	1,704

Armenian weightlifters were particularly successful in 2008. They came in first place at the 2008 European Weightlifting Championships and Tigran Gevorg Martirosyan, Gevorg Davtyan and Tigran Vardan Martirosyan all won bronze medals at the 2008 Summer Olympics, making it the most decorated Olympics for Armenia to date. Nazik Avdalyan won a gold medal at the 2009 World Weightlifting Championships and became the first weightlifter from independent Armenia to win a gold medal at the World Weightlifting Championships. Tigran Gevorg Martirosyan also won a gold medal at the 2010 World Weightlifting Championships, becoming the first male weightlifter from independent Armenia to do so. Hripsime Khurshudyan became the first Armenian woman to win an Olympic medal at the Olympics, having won a bronze medal in weightlifting at the 2012 Summer Olympics.

Oksen Mirzoyan later became the Head Coach of the Armenian national weightlifting team and is now the current Chairman of the Armenian Weightlifting Federation.

Armenia's statistics agency recorded a downward trend in the 21st century in the number of people practicing weightlifting. In 2005 Armenia had over 2,500 weightlifters, which dropped to 1,700 by 2021.

The 2023 European Weightlifting Championships were held in Yerevan from 15 to 23 April 2023.

== Records ==
=== Olympics ===
Note: Until 1991, Armenian SSR was part of the Soviet Union and in 1992, weightlifters from independent Armenia were part of the Unified Team

==== Men ====
Games	Name	Class	Medal	Ref
Soviet Union
(Canada) 1976 Montreal	Vardan Militosyan	75 kg	Silver	
(Soviet Union) 1980 Moscow	Yurik Sarkisyan	56 kg	Silver	
(Soviet Union) 1980 Moscow	Yurik Vardanyan	82.5 kg	Gold	
(South Korea) 1988 Seoul	Oksen Mirzoyan	56 kg	Gold	
(South Korea) 1988 Seoul	Israel Militosyan	67.5 kg	Silver	
Unified Team
(Spain) 1992 Barcelona	Israel Militosyan	67.5 kg	Gold	
Armenia
(Australia) 2000 Sydney	Arsen Melikyan	77 kg	Bronze	
(China) 2008 Beijing	~~Tigran G. Martirosyan~~ (disqualified)	69 kg	Bronze	
(China) 2008 Beijing	Gevorg Davtyan	77 kg	Bronze	
(China) 2008 Beijing	Tigran V. Martirosyan	85 kg	Silver	
(Brazil) 2016 Rio	Simon Martirosyan	105 kg	Silver	
(Brazil) 2016 Rio	Gor Minasyan	+105 kg	Silver	
(Japan) 2020 Tokyo	Simon Martirosyan	109 kg	Silver	
(France) 2024 Paris	Varazdat Lalayan	+102 kg	Silver	

==== Women ====
Games	Athlete	Class	Medal	Ref
(United Kingdom) 2012 London	Hripsime Khurshudyan	+75 kg	Bronze	

=== World Championships ===
==== Men ====
Year	Athlete	Class	Position	Ref
Soviet Union
(Poland) 1959 Warsaw	Akop Faradzhyan	67.5 kg	Silver	
(Germany) 1977 Stuttgart	Yurik Vardanyan	75 kg	Gold	
(United States) 1978 Gettysburg	Vardan Militosyan	75 kg	Silver	
(United States) 1978 Gettysburg	Yurik Vardanyan	82.5 kg	Gold	
(Greece) 1979 Thessaloniki	Yurik Vardanyan	82.5 kg	Gold	
(France) 1981 Lille	Yurik Sarkisyan	60 kg	Bronze	
(France) 1981 Lille	Yurik Vardanyan	82.5 kg	Gold	
(Socialist Federal Republic of Yugoslavia) 1982 Ljubljana	Oksen Mirzoyan	56 kg	Silver	
(Socialist Federal Republic of Yugoslavia) 1982 Ljubljana	Yurik Sarkisyan	60 kg	Gold	
(Socialist Federal Republic of Yugoslavia) 1982 Ljubljana	Yurik Vardanyan	90 kg	Silver	
(Soviet Union) 1983 Moscow	Oksen Mirzoyan	56 kg	Gold	
(Soviet Union) 1983 Moscow	Yurik Sarkisyan	60 kg	Gold	
(Soviet Union) 1983 Moscow	Yurik Vardanyan	82.5 kg	Gold	
(Sweden) 1985 Södertälje	Oksen Mirzoyan	56 kg	Silver	
(Sweden) 1985 Södertälje	Yurik Sarkisyan	60 kg	Silver	
(Sweden) 1985 Södertälje	Yurik Vardanyan	82.5 kg	Gold	
(Bulgaria) 1986 Sofia	Oksen Mirzoyan	56 kg	Bronze	
(Czech Republic) 1987 Ostrava	Yurik Sarkisyan	60 kg	Silver	
(Czech Republic) 1987 Ostrava	Oksen Mirzoyan	60 kg	Bronze	
(Greece) 1989 Athens	Israel Militosyan	67.5 kg	Gold	
(Germany) 1991 Donaueschingen	Yurik Sarkisyan	60 kg	Silver	
(Germany) 1991 Donaueschingen	Yurik Sarkisyan	67.5 kg	Silver	
Armenia
(Australia) 1993 Melbourne	Yurik Sarkisyan	64 kg	Bronze	
(Turkey) 1994 Istanbul	Sergo Chakhoyan	83 kg	Silver	
(China) 1995 Guangzhou	Aleksander Karapetyan	91 kg	Silver	
(Finland) 1998 Lahti	Ara Vardanyan	+105 kg	Silver	
(Dominican Republic) 2006 Santo Domingo	Ara Khachatryan	77 kg	Bronze	
(Dominican Republic) 2006 Santo Domingo	Tigran V. Martirosyan	85 kg	Bronze	
(Thailand) 2007 Chiang Mai	Gevorg Davtyan	77 kg	Silver	
(Korea) 2009 Goyang	Arakel Mirzoyan	69 kg	Silver	
(Korea) 2009 Goyang	Tigran G. Martirosyan	77 kg	Silver	
(Turkey) 2010 Antalya	Tigran G. Martirosyan	77 kg	Gold	
(United States) 2015 Houston	Andranik Karapetyan	77 kg	Bronze	
(United States) 2015 Houston	Gor Minasyan	+105 kg	Bronze	
(Turkmenistan) 2018 Ashgabat	Simon Martirosyan	109 kg	Gold	
(Turkmenistan) 2018 Ashgabat	Gor Minasyan	+109 kg	Silver	
(Thailand) 2019 Pattaya	Hakob Mkrtchyan	89 kg	Gold	
(Thailand) 2019 Pattaya	Simon Martirosyan	109 kg	Gold	
(Thailand) 2019 Pattaya	Gor Minasyan	+109 kg	Silver	
(Thailand) 2019 Pattaya	Ruben Aleksanyan	+109 kg	Bronze	
(Uzbekistan) 2021 Tashkent	Simon Martirosyan	109 kg	Bronze	
(Uzbekistan) 2021 Tashkent	Varazdat Lalayan	+109 kg	Silver	
(Uzbekistan) 2021 Tashkent	Gor Minasyan	+109 kg	Bronze	
(Colombia) 2022 Bogotá	Samvel Gasparyan	102 kg	Bronze	
(Colombia) 2022 Bogotá	Varazdat Lalayan	+109 kg	Bronze	
(Saudi Arabia) 2023 Riyadh	Gor Sahakyan	67 kg	Bronze	
(Bahrain) 2024 Manama	Varazdat Lalayan	+109 kg	Gold	
(Norway) 2025 Førde	Varazdat Lalayan	+110 kg	Gold	

==== Women ====
Year	Athlete	Class	Position	Ref
(Dominican Republic) 2006 Santo Domingo	Meline Daluzyan	63 kg	Bronze	
(Korea) 2009 Goyang	Nazik Avdalyan	69 kg	Gold	
(Korea) 2009 Goyang	Hripsime Khurshudyan	75 kg	Bronze	
(Turkey) 2010 Antalya	Meline Daluzyan	69 kg	Bronze	
(Bahrain) 2024 Manama	Aleksandra Grigoryan	55 kg	Bronze	

=== European Championships ===
==== Men ====
Year	Athlete	Class	Position	Ref
(Bulgaria) 1993 Sofia	Khachatur Kyapanaktsyan	76 kg	Gold	
(Czech Republic) 1994 Sokolov	Khachatur Kyapanaktsyan	76 kg	Silver	
(Poland) 1995 Warsaw	Khachatur Kyapanaktsyan	76 kg	Silver	
(Poland) 1995 Warsaw	Hovhannes Barseghyan	76 kg	Bronze	
(Poland) 1995 Warsaw	Aleksander Karapetyan	91 kg	Bronze	
(Germany) 1998 Riesa	Khachatur Kyapanaktsyan	77 kg	Bronze	
(Germany) 1998 Riesa	Ara Vardanyan	+105 kg	Bronze	
(Spain) 1999 A Coruña	Ashot Danielyan	+105 kg	Gold	
(Bulgaria) 2000 Sofia	Ashot Danielyan	+105 kg	Gold	
(Slovakia) 2001 Trenčín	Hovannes Amreyan	77 kg	Silver	
(Slovakia) 2001 Trenčín	Hakob Pilosyan	94 kg	Bronze	
(Greece) 2003 Loutraki	Ashot Danielyan	+105 kg	Silver	
(Bulgaria) 2005 Sofia	Arsen Melikyan	85 kg	Bronze	
(Bulgaria) 2005 Sofia	Ashot Danielyan	+105 kg	Bronze	
(Poland) 2006 Władysławowo	Armen Ghazaryan	69 kg	Bronze	
(Poland) 2006 Władysławowo	Gevorg Davtyan	77 kg	Gold	
(France) 2007 Strasbourg	Tigran G. Martirosyan	69 kg	Silver	
(France) 2007 Strasbourg	Gevorg Davtyan	77 kg	Gold	
(France) 2007 Strasbourg	Ara Khachatryan	77 kg	Silver	
(Italy) 2008 Lignano Sabbiadoro	Tigran G. Martirosyan	69 kg	Gold	
(Italy) 2008 Lignano Sabbiadoro	Ara Khachatryan	77 kg	Silver	
(Italy) 2008 Lignano Sabbiadoro	Tigran V. Martirosyan	85 kg	Gold	
(Romania) 2009 Bucharest	Arakel Mirzoyan	69 kg	Gold	
(Belarus) 2010 Minsk	Smbat Margaryan	56 kg	Silver	
(Belarus) 2010 Minsk	Tigran G. Martirosyan	77 kg	Gold	
(Belarus) 2010 Minsk	Gevorik Poghosyan	85 kg	Gold	
(Belarus) 2010 Minsk	Ara Khachatryan	85 kg	Silver	
(Belarus) 2010 Minsk	Ruben Aleksanyan	+105 kg	Silver	
(Russia) 2011 Kazan	Arayik Mirzoyan	77 kg	Silver	
(Israel) 2014 Tel-Aviv	Smbat Margaryan	56 kg	Bronze	
(Israel) 2014 Tel-Aviv	Vanik Avetisyan	69 kg	Silver	
(Israel) 2014 Tel-Aviv	Ruben Aleksanyan	+105 kg	Silver	
(Georgia (country)) 2015 Tbilisi	Smbat Margaryan	56 kg	Silver	
(Georgia (country)) 2015 Tbilisi	Tigran G. Martirosyan	77 kg	Gold	
(Georgia (country)) 2015 Tbilisi	Andranik Karapetyan	77 kg	Silver	
(Norway) 2016 Førde	Andranik Karapetyan	77 kg	Gold	
(Norway) 2016 Førde	Tigran Gevorg Martirosyan	77 kg	Silver	
(Norway) 2016 Førde	Gor Minasyan	+105 kg	Silver	
(Norway) 2016 Førde	Simon Martirosyan	105 kg	Bronze	
(Croatia) 2017 Split	Simon Martirosyan	105 kg	Gold	
(Croatia) 2017 Split	Gor Minasyan	+105 kg	Silver	
(Croatia) 2017 Split	Ruben Aleksanyan	+105 kg	Bronze	
(Georgia (country)) 2019 Batumi	Hakob Mkrtchyan	89 kg	Gold	
(Georgia (country)) 2019 Batumi	Davit Hovhannisyan	89 kg	Bronze	
(Georgia (country)) 2019 Batumi	Samvel Gasparyan	102 kg	Silver	
(Georgia (country)) 2019 Batumi	Simon Martirosyan	102 kg	Gold	
(Georgia (country)) 2019 Batumi	Ruben Aleksanyan	+109 kg	Bronze	
(Russia) 2021 Moscow	Karen Avagyan	-89 kg	Gold	
(Russia) 2021 Moscow	Andranik Karapetyan	-89 kg	Bronze	
(Russia) 2021 Moscow	Hakob Mkrtchyan	-96 kg	Bronze	
(Russia) 2021 Moscow	Samvel Gasparyan	-102 kg	Gold	
(Russia) 2021 Moscow	Arsen Martirosyan	-102 kg	Silver	
(Russia) 2021 Moscow	Gor Minasyan	+109 kg	Silver	
(Russia) 2021 Moscow	Varazdat Lalayan	+109 kg	Bronze	
(Albania) 2022 Tirana	Rafik Harutyunyan	-81 kg	Gold	
(Albania) 2022 Tirana	Davit Hovhannisyan	-96 kg	Gold	
(Albania) 2022 Tirana	Ara Aghanyan	-96 kg	Silver	
(Albania) 2022 Tirana	Samvel Gasparyan	-102 kg	Silver	
(Albania) 2022 Tirana	Arsen Martirosyan	-109 kg	Bronze	
(Albania) 2022 Tirana	Varazdat Lalayan	+109 kg	Silver	
(Albania) 2022 Tirana	Gor Minasyan	+109 kg	Bronze	
(Armenia) 2023 Yerevan	Gor Sahakyan	-67 kg	Gold	
(Armenia) 2023 Yerevan	Rafik Harutyunyan	-81 kg	Bronze	
(Armenia) 2023 Yerevan	Andranik Karapetyan	-89 kg	Silver	
(Armenia) 2023 Yerevan	Davit Hovhannisyan	-96 kg	Gold	
(Armenia) 2023 Yerevan	Ara Aghanyan	-96 kg	Silver	
(Armenia) 2023 Yerevan	Garik Karapetyan	-102 kg	Gold	
(Armenia) 2023 Yerevan	Samvel Gasparyan	-109 kg	Gold	
(Armenia) 2023 Yerevan	Petros Petrosyan	-109 kg	Bronze	
(Armenia) 2023 Yerevan	Varazdat Lalayan	+109 kg	Silver	
(Armenia) 2023 Yerevan	Simon Martirosyan	+109 kg	Bronze	
(Bulgaria) 2024 Sofia	Gor Sahakyan	-67 kg	Gold	
(Bulgaria) 2024 Sofia	Rafik Harutyunyan	-81 kg	Bronze	
(Bulgaria) 2024 Sofia	Hakob Mkrtchyan	-96 kg	Gold	
(Bulgaria) 2024 Sofia	Davit Hovhannisyan	-96 kg	Silver	
(Bulgaria) 2024 Sofia	Samvel Gasparyan	-102 kg	Silver	
(Bulgaria) 2024 Sofia	Garik Karapetyan	-102 kg	Bronze	
(Bulgaria) 2024 Sofia	Varazdat Lalayan	+109 kg	Gold	
(Bulgaria) 2024 Sofia	Simon Martirosyan	+109 kg	Silver	
(Moldova) 2025 Chișinău	Garnik Cholakyan	-61 kg	Bronze	
(Moldova) 2025 Chișinău	Gor Sahakyan	-73 kg	Silver	
(Moldova) 2025 Chișinău	Rafik Harutyunyan	-81 kg	Silver	
(Moldova) 2025 Chișinău	Davit Hovhannisyan	-96 kg	Silver	
(Moldova) 2025 Chișinău	Garik Karapetyan	-109 kg	Gold	
(Moldova) 2025 Chișinău	Simon Martirosyan	-109 kg	Silver	
(Moldova) 2025 Chișinău	Varazdat Lalayan	+109 kg	Gold	
(Georgia (country)) 2026 Batumi	Garnik Cholakyan	60 kg	Silver	
(Georgia (country)) 2026 Batumi	Gor Sahakyan	71 kg	Silver	
(Georgia (country)) 2026 Batumi	Martin Poghosyan	79 kg	Bronze	
(Georgia (country)) 2026 Batumi	Ara Aghanyan	94 kg	Silver	
(Georgia (country)) 2026 Batumi	Garik Karapetyan	110 kg	Gold	
(Georgia (country)) 2026 Batumi	Varazdat Lalayan	+110 kg	Gold	

==== Women ====
Year	Athlete	Class	Position	Ref
(Poland) 2006 Władysławowo	Hripsime Khurshudyan	75 kg	Silver	
(France) 2007 Strasbourg	Meline Daluzyan	63 kg	Gold	
(France) 2007 Strasbourg	Nazik Avdalyan	69 kg	Silver	
(France) 2007 Strasbourg	Hripsime Khurshudyan	75 kg	Gold	
(Italy) 2008 Lignano Sabbiadoro	Meline Daluzyan	63 kg	Gold	
(Italy) 2008 Lignano Sabbiadoro	Nazik Avdalyan	69 kg	Gold	
(Romania) 2009 Bucharest	Nazik Avdalyan	69 kg	Silver	
(Romania) 2009 Bucharest	Hripsime Khurshudyan	75 kg	Silver	
(Belarus) 2010 Minsk	Meline Daluzyan	69 kg	Silver	
(Belarus) 2010 Minsk	Hripsime Khurshudyan	75 kg	Bronze	
(Russia) 2011 Kazan	Hripsime Khurshudyan	+ 75 kg	Silver	
(Norway) 2016 Førde	Nazik Avdalyan	69 kg	Gold	
(Norway) 2016 Førde	Hripsime Khurshudyan	+75 kg	Gold	
(Croatia) 2017 Split	Sona Poghosyan	-75 kg	Bronze	
(Croatia) 2017 Split	Tatev Hakobyan	-90 kg	Bronze	
(Georgia (country)) 2019 Batumi	Liana Gyurjyan	-81 kg	Bronze	
(Russia) 2021 Moscow	Liana Gyurjyan	-81 kg	Bronze	
(Armenia) 2023 Yerevan	Izabella Yaylyan	-55 kg	Bronze	
(Armenia) 2023 Yerevan	Tatev Hakobyan	-81 kg	Silver	
(Armenia) 2023 Yerevan	Hripsime Khurshudyan	-87 kg	Bronze	
(Bulgaria) 2024 Sofia	Aleksandra Grigoryan	-55 kg	Gold	
(Bulgaria) 2024 Sofia	Hripsime Khurshudyan	-87 kg	Bronze	
(Moldova) 2025 Chișinău	Aleksandra Grigoryan	-55 kg	Silver	
(Moldova) 2025 Chișinău	Anna Amroyan	-76 kg	Silver	
(Moldova) 2025 Chișinău	Liana Gyurjyan	-87 kg	Silver	
(Georgia (country)) 2026 Batumi	Aleksandra Grigoryan	-58 kg	Silver	
(Georgia (country)) 2026 Batumi	Emma Poghosyan	-86 kg	Gold	
