= Armenian Powerlifting Federation =

Sports organization of Armenia

Armenian Powerlifting Federation logo

The Armenian Powerlifting Federation (APF) (Armenian: Հայաստանի Ուժային Եռամարտի ֆեդերացիա) is the regulating body of powerlifting in Armenia, governed by the Armenian Olympic Committee. The headquarters of the federation is located in Yerevan.

== History ==
The Armenian Powerlifting Federation is currently led by president Levon Kocharyan. The Federation oversees the training of powerlifting specialists and organizes Armenia's participation in European and international level powerlifting competitions. The Federation also hosts powerlifting events throughout Armenia. The Federation is a full member of the International Powerlifting Federation and the European Powerlifting Federation.

== See also ==
- Armenian Weightlifting Federation
- Sport in Armenia
- Weightlifting in Armenia
