= Weightlifting Federation of Armenia =

National governing body for weightlifting in Armenia

- Sport: Weightlifting
- Jurisdiction: Armenia
- Abbreviation: WFA
- Founded: 1928
- Affiliation: IWF
- Regional affiliation: EWF
- Headquarters: Yerevan, Armenia
- President: Arayik Harutyunyan
- Secretary: Samvel Gasparyan

Official website
- wfa.am
- (Armenia)

The Weightlifting Federation of Armenia (WFA; Armenian: Հայաստանի ծանրամարտի ֆեդերացիա) is the national governing body for the sport of weightlifting in Armenia. It is affiliated with the International Weightlifting Federation (IWF) and the European Weightlifting Federation (EWF).

The federation is headquartered in Yerevan. It oversees the organisation and development of weightlifting in Armenia, including national competitions, athlete development and participation in international championships.

According to the European Weightlifting Federation, the Armenian federation was founded in 1928 and became affiliated in 1992.

Since January 2025, the federation has been led by President Arayik Harutyunyan. Former European weightlifting champion Samvel Gasparyan serves as General Secretary.

== History ==
=== Origins and international affiliation ===
Organised weightlifting has a long history in Armenia, with the sport developing during the Soviet period.

The European Weightlifting Federation records 1928 as the founding year of the Armenian federation and 1992 as its affiliation year.

A different founding year, 1922, appears in the Armenian business directory Spyur.

The discrepancy between these historical dates has not been conclusively resolved by the available sources.

Following Armenia's independence from the Soviet Union, the federation developed its representation within the international weightlifting system.

Armenian athletes compete in events organised by the IWF and EWF, including the World Weightlifting Championships and European Weightlifting Championships, as well as Olympic weightlifting.

=== Development after independence ===
The federation's leadership changed several times during the 2000s and 2010s.

Olympic champion Oksen Mirzoyan headed the federation from 1998 to 2004, as he confirmed in a 2013 interview with Armenpress.

By early 2005, Shahen Hovasapyan had been elected president. His appointment was reported by the Armenian newspaper Aravot in April 2005.

On 6 April 2006, former weightlifter Samvel Khachatryan was elected president, succeeding Hovasapyan.

Following the 2012 Summer Olympics, Khachatryan resigned. Armen Shahazizyan subsequently assumed the presidency.

Shahazizyan resigned in February 2016. The Armenian National Olympic Committee temporarily assumed responsibility for the federation's affairs until after the Rio de Janeiro Olympic Games.

Hrachya Rostomyan subsequently headed the federation from 2016 to January 2025.

== Leadership and governance ==
The federation is administered by its elected leadership and governing bodies.

Its organisational structure includes a president, a general secretary, an executive committee and specialised committees concerned with coaching and technical matters.

=== Presidents ===
The following table lists the federation presidents whose terms have been identified in published sources.

No.	President	Term of office	Notes
1	Oksen Mirzoyan	1998–2004	Olympic weightlifting champion and former president of the federation.
2	Shahen Hovasapyan	2005–2006	Elected in 2005; later appointed honorary president of the federation.
3	Samvel Khachatryan	2006–2012	Elected on 6 April 2006; resigned following the 2012 Olympic Games.
4	Armen Shahazizyan	2012–2016	Succeeded Khachatryan and resigned in February 2016.
5	Hrachya Rostomyan	2016–2025	Led the federation until the January 2025 presidential election.
6	Arayik Harutyunyan	2025–present	Elected on 22 January 2025 for a four-year term.

Note: The available sources do not establish a complete list of presidents before 1998. The leadership arrangements between Mirzoyan's departure in 2004 and Hovasapyan's election in 2005 have not been fully documented. Following Shahazizyan's resignation in February 2016, the Armenian National Olympic Committee temporarily handled federation affairs.

=== 2025 presidential election ===
On 22 January 2025, the federation held an electoral congress in Yerevan.

Arayik Harutyunyan, then Chief of Staff of the Prime Minister of Armenia, was elected president for a four-year term.

He was the only candidate following Hrachya Rostomyan's decision not to seek re-election.

The election was attended by International Weightlifting Federation President Mohammed Jalood and IWF General Secretary Antonio Urso.

=== General Secretary ===
The federation's General Secretary is responsible for administrative and organisational activities within the federation.

In early 2025, former Armenian weightlifter Samvel Gasparyan was appointed General Secretary.

Gasparyan is a two-time European weightlifting champion (2021 and 2023) and a bronze medallist at the 2022 World Weightlifting Championships.

He had announced his retirement from competitive weightlifting in September 2024.

The European Weightlifting Federation lists Gasparyan as the federation's General Secretary.

== International affiliations ==
The Weightlifting Federation of Armenia is affiliated with the following international organisations:

- International Weightlifting Federation (IWF) – international governing body for weightlifting.
- European Weightlifting Federation (EWF) – continental governing body responsible for European weightlifting competitions.

The European Weightlifting Federation records Armenia's affiliation from 1992.

Through these affiliations, Armenian weightlifters participate in international championships and competitions conducted under the relevant international rules.

== International championships in Armenia ==
=== 2023 European Weightlifting Championships ===
Armenia hosted the 2023 European Weightlifting Championships in Yerevan from 15 to 23 April 2023.

The event took place at the Karen Demirchyan Sports and Concerts Complex.

The championships brought together European national teams competing in men's and women's weightlifting categories.

The event was an important international weightlifting competition hosted by Armenia.

=== 2027 World Weightlifting Championships ===
On 29 March 2024, the Executive Board of the International Weightlifting Federation awarded Armenia the hosting rights for the 2027 World Weightlifting Championships.

The decision was announced following an IWF Executive Board meeting in Phuket, Thailand.

Yerevan was selected as the host city, following its organisation of the 2023 European Championships.

The championships are scheduled to take place in Yerevan in 2027.

== National teams and development ==
The federation coordinates activities related to Armenia's national weightlifting teams.

Its national team structure includes men's, women's, junior and youth teams.

According to the federation's official staff directory, specialised coaching and medical personnel support the national teams.

The federation also maintains technical and coaching committees involved in domestic weightlifting activities.

== See also ==
- Weightlifting in Armenia
- Armenia at the Olympics
- National Olympic Committee of Armenia
- International Weightlifting Federation
- European Weightlifting Federation
- 2023 European Weightlifting Championships
- 2027 World Weightlifting Championships

== History ==
Previous logo

The Federation was established in 1922 and the current president is Arayik Harutyunyan. The Federation is a full member of the International Weightlifting Federation and the European Weightlifting Federation.

Armenian weightlifting athletes participate in the World Weightlifting Championships, the European Weightlifting Championships, as well as weightlifting at the Summer Olympics.

On 21 April 2022, it was announced the 2023 European Weightlifting Championships would be held in Armenia. The Championships were held in Yerevan from 15 to 23 April 2023.

== See also ==
- Armenian Powerlifting Federation
- Sport in Armenia
- Weightlifting in Armenia
