= 2010 in weightlifting =

This article lists the main weightlifting events and their results for 2010.

== World & Grand Prix weightlifting championships ==
- June 11 – ?: 2010 World Junior Weightlifting Championships in (Bulgaria) Sofia
  - China won both the gold and overall medal tallies.
- July 1 – ?: 2010 World University Weightlifting Championships in Taichung
  - Chinese Taipei won both the gold and overall medal tallies.
- August 15 – 19: 2010 Summer Youth Olympics in Singapore.
  - China finished first in medal tally.
- September 16 – 26: 2010 World Weightlifting Championships in (Turkey) Antalya
  - China and Russia won 3 gold medals each. China won the overall medal tally.
- December 11 – ?: 2010 IWF Continental Clubs Grand Prix in (Malaysia) Penang
  - China won the gold medal tally. India won the overall medal tally.

== Continental & regional weightlifting championships ==
- March 21 – ?: 2010 African Junior & Youth Weightlifting Championships in Cairo
  - Junior: Egypt won both the gold and overall medal tallies.
  - Youth: Egypt won both the gold and overall medal tallies.
- April 2 – 11: 2010 European Weightlifting Championships in (Belarus) Minsk
  - Russia won both the gold and overall medal tallies.
- April 6 – ?: 2010 Pan American Junior Weightlifting Championships in (Ecuador) Quito
  - Colombia won both the gold and overall medal tallies.
- April 8 – ?: 2010 Asian Junior & Youth Weightlifting Championships in (Uzbekistan) Tashkent
  - Junior: China won both the gold and overall medal tallies.
  - Youth: China won both the gold and overall medal tallies.
- April 20 – ?: 2010 Pan American Youth Weightlifting Championships in (Peru) Chiclayo
  - Colombia won the gold medal tally. Colombia and Mexico won 11 overall medals each.
- May 4 – ?: 2010 Oceania (Senior, Junior, & Youth) Weightlifting Championships in (Fiji) Suva
  - Senior: Australia and Samoa won 5 gold medals each. Australia won the overall medal tally.
  - Junior: Samoa won the gold medal tally. Australia won the overall medal tally.
  - Youth: Australia won both the gold and overall medal tallies.
- May 18 – ?: 2010 European Youth Weightlifting Championships in (Spain) Valencia
  - Romania won the gold medal tally. Russia won the overall medal tally.
- May 25 – ?: 2010 Pan American Weightlifting Championships in Guatemala City
  - Colombia won both the gold and overall medal tallies.
- August 2 – ?: 2010 African Weightlifting Championships in (Cameroon) Yaoundé
  - Tunisia won both the gold and overall medal tallies.
- November 20 – ?: 2010 European Junior & U23 Weightlifting Championships in (Cyprus) Limassol
  - Junior: Russia won both the gold and overall medal tallies.
  - U23: Russia won both the gold and overall medal tallies.
