= Zhang Shaoling =

Macanese weightlifter

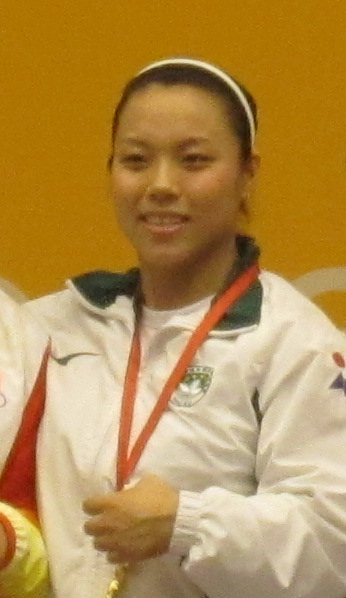
- at 2009 Hong Kong East Asian Games

Personal information
- Nationality: Macanese
- Born: 4 November 1984 (age 41) Portuguese Macau
- Weight: 73.77 kg (163 lb)

Sport
- Country: Macau
- Sport: Weightlifting
- Event: 75 kg

Achievements and titles
- Personal bests: Snatch: 112 kg (2009); Clean and jerk: 137 kg (2010); Total: 248 kg (2009)
Medal record
Women's weightlifting
Representing Macau
Event	1st	2nd	3rd
World Championships	0	0	1
Asian Championships	2	0	0
East Asian Games	1	0	0
Total	3	0	1
World Championships
Bronze medal – third place	2009 Goyang	–69 kg
Asian Championships
Gold medal – first place	2009 Taldykorgan	-69 kg
Gold medal – first place	2011 Tongling	-69 kg
East Asian Games
Gold medal – first place	2009 Hong Kong	-69 kg

Zhang Shaoling (張少玲,born 4 November 1984) is a Macanese weightlifter. She represents Macau at international competitions.

She is the first weightlifter from Macau to win a medal at the World Weightlifting Championships.

== Career ==
Zhang competed at the 2009 Asian Weightlifting Championships in the women's 69 kg category. She placed first and won the gold medal. She also participated in the 2009 World Weightlifting Championships in the women's 69 kg category, winning a bronze medal and the first medal for Macau ever. She also participated at the 2009 East Asian Games winning at the same category.

== Major results ==
Year	Venue	Weight	Snatch (kg)				Clean & Jerk (kg)				Total	Rank
Year	Venue	Weight	1	2	3	Rank	1	2	3	Rank	Total	Rank
World Championships
2009	Goyang, South Korea	69 kg	105	110	112	3rd place, bronze medalist(s)	133	136	~~140~~	3rd place, bronze medalist(s)	248	3rd place, bronze medalist(s)
2010	Antalya, Turkey	69 kg	106	~~109~~	~~109~~	4	130	~~136~~	137	4	243	4
2011	Paris, France	75 kg	65	70	75	24	80	85	90	23	165	23
Asian Championships
2009	Taldykorgan, Kazakhstan	69 kg	107	—N/a	—N/a	1st place, gold medalist(s)	134	—N/a	—N/a	3rd place, bronze medalist(s)	241	1st place, gold medalist(s)
2011	Tongling, China	69 kg	100	102	105	1st place, gold medalist(s)	123	~~130~~	—N/a	1st place, gold medalist(s)	228	1st place, gold medalist(s)
