= Baghramyan, Ararat =

Baghramyan Բաղրամյան
- Location within Armenia Location within Ararat
- Coordinates: 39°58′36″N 44°31′10″E
- Country: Armenia
- Province: Ararat
- Municipality: Artashat

Population (2011)
  - Total: 1,614
- Time zone: UTC+4
  - Summer (DST): UTC+5

Baghramyan (Armenian: Բաղրամյան) is a village in the Artashat Municipality of the Ararat Province of Armenia. It is named after the Soviet Armenian military commander and Marshal of the Soviet Union Hovhannes Baghramyan.

== Notable people ==
- Arayik Mirzoyan, European silver medalist in weightlifting
