= Nazik Avdalyan =

Armenian weightlifter (born 1986)

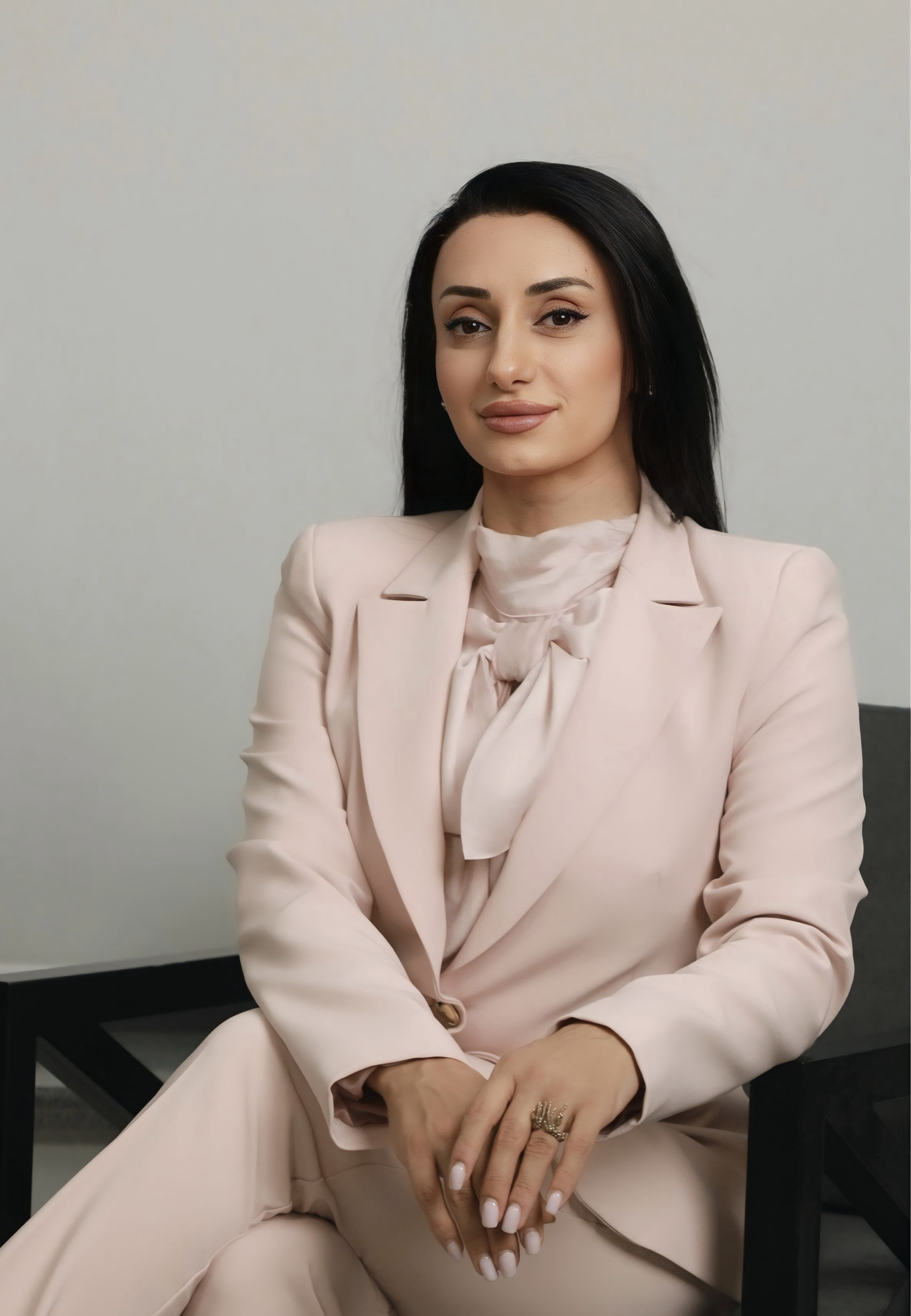

Personal information
- Nationality: Armenian
- Born: October 31, 1986 (age 39) Gyumri, Armenia
- Height: 1.57 m (5 ft 2 in)
- Weight: 69 kg (152 lb)
- Website: Nazik Avdalyan

Sport
- Country: Armenia
- Sport: Weightlifting
- Event: Women's 69 kg
- Coached by: Artashes Nersisyan
Medal record
World Championships
Gold medal – first place	2009 Goyang	-69 kg
European Championships
Silver medal – second place	2007 Strasbourg	-69 kg
Gold medal – first place	2008 Lignano Sabbiadoro	-69 kg
Silver medal – second place	2009 Bucharest	-69 kg
Gold medal – first place	2016 Førde	-69 kg

Nazik Avdalyan (Armenian: Նազիկ Ավդալյան; born October 31, 1986, in Gyumri, Armenia) is an Armenian weightlifter known for her achievements in weightlifting. She won a gold medal at the 2009 World Weightlifting Championships. Avdalyan is the first ever weightlifter from Armenia to win a gold medal at the World Weightlifting Championships and the first ever woman from Armenia to win a world championship in any sport. Since April 2025 she's the founder of Sports Development Foundation. "The Reverse Side Of The Medal", the film of her career that was shot in 2024.

== Early life and education ==
Nazik Avdalyan was born on October 31, 1986, in Gyumri, Armenia. She was raised in a family of an engineer (father- Vardan Haykaz Avdalyan) and an accountant (mother- Anush Karlen Vardanyan). She was the eldest of her two siblings. From the age of 5 to 17 she did acrobatics. As back then opportunity to participate in overseas competition was not abundant, at the age of 18 she decided to shift her professional career path to weightlifting. By doing so she could stay in sport which she was deeply in love with. Her trainer was Artashes Nersisyan. From 1993 to 2003 she attended Basic School No. 4 in Gyumri. From 2003 to 2007 she studied at Gyumri State Pedagogical University, the faculty of Physical Education, the department of Kinesiology. From 2020 to 2021 she did her Master’s Degree in the Armenian State Institute of Physical Culture and Sport, the faculty of Sport psychology.

== Competitive career ==
2006 World Championships

In 2006 she appeared at an international championship for the first time which was the World Championship in Santo Domingo (Dominican Republic). She started in the weight class up to 69 kg body weight (KG) and achieved 221 kg (100–121) in the duel with which she took seventh place.

2007 European Championships

In 2007, in Strasbourg she became vice-European champion (up to 69 kg body weight) and increased her performance in duels to 241 kg (105–136).

2007 World Championships

At the 2007 World Championships in Chiang Mai, Thailand, Nazik Avdalyan did not quite come close to Strasbourg's performance with 235 kg (102–135) and ended in fifth place.

2008 European Championships

In 2008 she won her first title at the European Championships in Lignano. She won the class up to 69 kg body weight with 242 kg (106–131) ahead of Tatyana Matveyeva from Russia, who scored 239 kg. At the 2008 Olympic Games in Beijing, she did not take part.

2008 World University Championships

Nazik Avdalyan took part in the 2008 World University Championships in Komotini, Greece (up to 69 kg body weight) and completed in second place.

2009 European Championships

In 2009, Nazik Avdalyan achieved 245 kg (110–135) in a duel at the European Championships in Bucharest and with this performance she took second place.

2009 World Championships

At the 2009 World Championships in Goyang/South Korea, she surprised her competitors and the professional audience with an increase to 266 kg (119–147), with which she became the new world champion in the class up to 69 kg body weight. For the first time at an international championship, she defeated Oksana Slivenko, who achieved 264 kg and came in second place. Since 2009 nobody has ever recorded such a result in the world.

2015 World Championships

In 2015 after having had six years of career break since 2009, seven months after being operated on, she returned to professional sport and had a trial participation in the World Championship held in Houston, US, where she took the 12th place.

2016 European Weightlifting Championships

In 2016 after seven years of absence, Nazik Avdalyan made an incredible comeback and won a gold medal at the 2016 European Weightlifting Championships in Førde, Norway.

31st Olympic Games (2016)

In 2016, Nazik Avdalyan achieved 242 kg (107–135) in the 31st Olympic Games in Rio de Janeiro, Brazil and completed in fifth place.

== Weightlifting statistics ==
Year	Venue	Tournament	Weight	Snatch (kg)	Clean & Jerk (kg)	Rank
2006	Santo Domingo, Dominican Republic	World Championship	69 kg	221 kg	100-121	7
2007	Strasbourg, France	European Championship	69 kg	241 kg	105-136	2nd place, silver medalist(s)
2007	Chiang Mai, Thailand	World Championship	69 kg	235 kg	102-133	5
2008	Lignano Sabbiadoro, Italy	European Championship	69 kg	242 kg	106-136	1st place, gold medalist(s)
2008	Komotini, Greece	World University Championship	69 kg	215 kg	95-120	2nd place, silver medalist(s)
2009	Bucharest, Romania	European Championship	69 kg	245 kg	110-135	2nd place, silver medalist(s)
2009	Goyang, South Korea	World Championship	69 kg	266 kg	119-147	1st place, gold medalist(s)
2015	Houston, United States	World Championship	69 kg	230 kg	105-125	12
2016	Førde, Norway	European Championship	69 kg	237 kg	105-132	1st place, gold medalist(s)
2016	Rio de Janeiro, Brazil	31st Olympic Games	69 kg	242 kg	107-135	5

== Honors ==
- 2007, European Championship, one bronze and two silver medals
- 2008, European Championship, three gold medals
- 2008, World University Championship, one bronze and two silver medals
- 2009, European Championship, one bronze and two gold medals
- 2009, World Championship, three gold medals
- 2016, European Championship, one silver and two gold medals

== Certificates of Honor ==
- Certificate of Appreciation from the European Weightlifting Federation (EWF) for outstanding performance and dedication during the 10th European Weightlifting Championships, which was held in Yerevan, Armenia in 2023.
- Nazik Avdalyan has successfully completed a Bodybuilding and Fitness Coaching Training short course and examination held by the Armenian Association of Sport Medicine & True Vector LLC 04/03/23 in Yerevan, Armenia.
- Certificate by the European Weightlifting Federation (EWF) to Nazik Avdalyan for her outstanding performance and dedication during the 10th European Senior Championship held in Yerevan, Armenia in 2022.
- Nazik Avdalyan is encouraged for her contribution to the World Weightlifting Championship in Korea and for being the winner of the championship. Awarded by the Ministry of Education and Science of Armenia.
- Awarded to the winner of the first place in the shooting competition of the inter-university sports games "Lecturer's Cup” in 2021.
- Certificate from the Union of Armenians of Europe, conferring the title of "Honorary Member" upon Mrs. Nazik Avdalyan. The certificate is dated November 11, 2017.
- Shirak Region Representation of the Armenian National Olympic Committee is presenting an award to Nazik Avdalyan for her 2016 Rio de Janeiro, Brazil 31st Olympic Games 69 kg with 242 kg 107-135 achievement of securing the first place in both the individual and team competitions at the 2016 European Weightlifting Championships.
- In the category of "Female Athlete of the Year", European and World Champion, Honored Master of Sports Nazik Avdalyan has been awarded the "LADY OF ARMENIA 2016" prize.
- Certificate is awarded to Nazik Avdalyan by the Ministry of Culture, Youth Affairs and Sports of Armenia (N001) as a Master of Sport of Armenia. Issued in 2009.
- The Administration of Gyumri Sports High Mastery School awards athlete Nazik Avdalyan for being recognized as the best athlete of the 2008 "Competition Season".
- The Gyumri Municipality is presenting a Certificate of Honor to an individual who was recognized as the best athlete of Gyumri city during the 2007 "Competition Season".
- Certificate awarded to Nazik Avdalyan for being recognized as the best young athlete of the Shirak Province in the “Tournament-2006”.
- Certificate is awarded to Nazik Avdalyan by the Ministry of Culture, Youth Affairs and Sports of Armenia as a Master of Sport of Armenia. Issued in 2001.
- Awarded to Nazik Avdalyan for being included in the top ten best school-age athletes of the Shirak Province in the "Tournament-2000".

== Personal life ==
On April 26, 2010, Nazik Avdalyan got in a car crash on Yerevan-Gyumri motorway and was taken to Gyumri Medical Center. She had received multiple bone fractures and a spine injury. Nazik Avdalyan was transferred to Yerevan's Erebuni Medical Centre for additional examination and underwent lumbar surgery on April 28. After the rehabilitation process, Avdalyan said that she would be able to compete in sports again in 2015. After seven years of absence Avdalyan made a huge comeback and won a gold medal at the 2016 European Weightlifting Championships. Along with the victories recorded during her sports career, Nazik experienced numerous injuries; ankle ligament injury, total tear of the anterior cruciate ligament in the left knee, meniscus tear, right wrist joint injury, elbow joint injury, partial rupture of the elbow ligaments, partial tear of the middle deltoid, two rib fractures, L1 lumbar vertebra fracture.

== Career ==
- 2013-2014, senior coach of the Women's Youth Weightlifting team
- 2020-2022, lecturer at Yerevan State Medical University, Department of Physical Education
- 2021-2022, deputy director of Shengavit Children & Youth Complex Sports School
- Since 2022 she has been working as a fitness trainer
- Since 2023 international referee
- Since 2025 The founder of Sports Development Foundation

== Legacy and impact certificates ==
- UNIQUE AWARDS Ceremony 2022-2023: Awarded to Nazik Avdalyan for her contribution to the field of sports, for waving the Armenian tricolor many times from international platforms, she is awarded the UNIQUE AWARDS special prize.
- Nazik Avdalyan is awarded for close cooperation with the Military University named after V. Sargsyan of the Ministry of Defence of Armenia in 2021.
- A certificate of appreciation is awarded to Nazik Avdalyan for her contribution to the film "Voice of the Greats" dedicated to the 100th anniversary of the Museum of Literature and Art in 2021.
- The certificate appears to be issued by the Armenian Art, Culture, and Development charity (AAD) for Nazik Avdalyan’s contribution to Armenian sports in 2021.
- A certificate of gratitude is given to Nazik Avdalyan for joining the initiative to donate school furniture to the schools of the Gyulagarak community in 2021.
- Certificate issued by "El-Mar Cinema Production" on November 28, 2021, for vigorous cooperation and for her efficient work.
- Ministry of Education, Science, Culture and Sports of Armenia Yerevan State College of Culture and Arts certificate of honor given to World and European Weightlifting Champion Nazik Avdalyan for her contribution to Armenian sports in 2021.
- A certificate of appreciation is awarded to Nazik Avdalyan for having a great contribution to the development of weightlifting in Artsakh in 2019.
- The certificate appears to be issued by the Armenian Art, Culture, and Development charity (AAD) for Nazik Avdalyan’s contribution to Armenian sports in 2018.
- In 2016 Nazik Avdalyan is being awarded by the Gyumri Municipality of Armenia for her dedication to sports and for securing the first place in the European Weightlifting Championships.
- In 2009 Nazik Avdalyan is awarded the "Phenomenon of the Year" and "Person of the Year" titles by the "Hayeli" Press Club for her success in winning the gold medal at the 2009 World Weightlifting Championships.
- President S. Sargsyan awarded N. V. Avdalyan with 2nd Degree Medal "For Service to the Homeland", for upholding the athletic honor of the homeland, properly representing Armenia in the international arena, as well as for promoting the development of weightlifting in Armenia in 2009.
- Certificate is awarded to Nazik Avdalyan by the Ministry of Culture, Youth Affairs and Sports of Armenia as a Master of Sport of Armenia. Issued in 2001.
- Nazik Avdalyan is being granted the honorary title of "Honorary Citizen of Gyumri."
