= Ümmühan Uçar =

Turkish weightlifter

Ümmühan Uçar Gürçay
Personal information
- Nationality: Turkish
- Born: January 1, 1986 (age 40) Kütahya
- Weight: 87 kg (192 lb)

Sport
- Country: Turkey
- Sport: Weightlifting
- Event: +75 kg
Medal record
European Championships
Silver medal – second place	2011 Kazan	+75 kg

Ümmühan Uçar Gürçay (born 1986 in Kütahya) is a Turkish weightlifter competing in the women's +75 kg division.

She started weightlifting at the age of 13 in the primary school, in the beginning against her parents' will. After two months' training, she achieved second place at the national championship that enabled her further performing in this sports.

== Achievements ==
European Championships

Rank	Event	Year	Venue	Snatch	Clean & Jerk	Total
Bronze	+75 kg	2010	Minsk, BLR	117.0		
Bronze	+75 kg	2011	Kazan, RUS	113.0		
Bronze	+75 kg	2011	Kazan, RUS		136.0	
Bronze	+75 kg	2011	Kazan, RUS			249.0
