= Gevorik Poghosyan =

Armenian weightlifter (born 1984)

Medal record

Men's Weightlifting

Representing Armenia

European Championships
Gold medal – first place	2010 Minsk	-85 kg
Bronze medal – third place	2011 Kazan	-85 kg

Gevorik Poghosyan (Armenian: Գեվորիկ Պողոսյան, born March 13, 1984, in Yerevan, Armenia) is an Armenian weightlifter. He won a gold medal at the 2010 European Weightlifting Championships.
