= Samvel Gasparyan =

Armenian weightlifter and sports administrator

Personal information
- Nationality: Armenian
- Born: 24 November 1997 (age 28) Gyumri, Armenia
- Occupation: Sports administrator

Sport
- Country: Armenia
- Sport: Weightlifting
- Weight class: 102 kg, 109 kg
- Coached by: Harutyun Yeghoyan
- Retired: 2024
Medal record
Men's weightlifting
Representing Armenia
World Championships
Bronze medal – third place	2022 Bogotá	102 kg
European Championships
Gold medal – first place	2021 Moscow	102 kg
Gold medal – first place	2023 Yerevan	109 kg
Silver medal – second place	2019 Batumi	102 kg
Silver medal – second place	2022 Tirana	102 kg
Silver medal – second place	2024 Sofia	102 kg
World Junior Championships
Bronze medal – third place	2017 Tokyo	105 kg
European Junior and U23 Championships
Gold medal – first place	2015 Klaipėda	94 kg (Junior)
Bronze medal – third place	2016 Eilat	94 kg (Junior)
Silver medal – second place	2017 Durrës	105 kg (Junior)
Gold medal – first place	2019 Bucharest	109 kg (U23)
European Youth Championships
Silver medal – second place	2014 Ciechanów	85 kg

Samvel Gasparyan (born 24 November 1997) is an Armenian sports administrator and former weightlifter. He serves as the General Secretary of the Weightlifting Federation of Armenia.

Gasparyan is a two-time European champion, having won gold medals in 2021 and 2023. He also won a bronze medal at the 2022 World Weightlifting Championships and three silver medals at the European Championships in 2019, 2022 and 2024.

== Early life and sporting background ==
Gasparyan was born on 24 November 1997 in Gyumri, Armenia.

He began weightlifting at a young age under the guidance of Harutyun Yeghoyan, his uncle and longtime coach.

== Weightlifting career ==
=== Junior and under-23 career ===
Gasparyan competed internationally in youth, junior and under-23 weightlifting competitions before establishing himself at senior level.

In 2014, he won a silver medal in the 85 kg category at the European Youth Championships in Ciechanów, Poland.

In 2015, he became European junior champion in the 94 kg category at the championships held in Klaipėda, Lithuania.

He subsequently won bronze in the 94 kg category at the 2016 European Junior Championships in Eilat, Israel, and silver in the 105 kg category at the 2017 European Junior Championships in Durrës, Albania.

At the 2017 Junior World Weightlifting Championships in Tokyo, Japan, Gasparyan won the bronze medal in the men's 105 kg category with a total of 365 kg.

In 2019, he won gold in the 109 kg category at the European Under-23 Championships in Bucharest, Romania.

=== Senior career ===
==== 2019–2021: First European title ====
At the 2019 European Weightlifting Championships in Batumi, Georgia, Gasparyan won the silver medal in the men's 102 kg category with a total of 377 kg.

In 2021, he became European champion in the 102 kg category at the championships in Moscow, Russia. He lifted 176 kg in the snatch and 214 kg in the clean and jerk, achieving a combined total of 390 kg.

Later that year, he participated in the 2021 World Weightlifting Championships in Tashkent, Uzbekistan.

==== 2022: World Championship bronze ====
At the 2022 European Weightlifting Championships in Tirana, Albania, Gasparyan secured the silver medal in the men's 102 kg category with a combined total of 390 kg.

Later in 2022, he won the bronze medal in the 102 kg category at the 2022 World Weightlifting Championships in Bogotá, Colombia, recording 175 kg in the snatch and 214 kg in the clean and jerk for a total of 389 kg.

==== 2023: Second European title ====
At the 2023 European Weightlifting Championships in Yerevan, Armenia, Gasparyan won his second senior European title, competing in the men's 109 kg category.

He lifted 175 kg in the snatch and 220 kg in the clean and jerk, finishing with a total of 395 kg and winning the gold medal.

==== 2024: Final European Championship and retirement ====
At the 2024 European Weightlifting Championships in Sofia, Bulgaria, Gasparyan earned the silver medal in the 102 kg category.

He recorded 180 kg in the snatch and 216 kg in the clean and jerk, achieving a total of 396 kg.

On 23 September 2024, Gasparyan announced his retirement from competitive weightlifting, citing recurring knee injuries.

== Sports administration ==
In early 2025, Gasparyan was appointed General Secretary of the Weightlifting Federation of Armenia, following the conclusion of his competitive weightlifting career.

His appointment marked his transition from international competition to sports administration.

The European Weightlifting Federation lists Gasparyan as General Secretary of the Armenian federation in its official member federation directory.

== Major results ==
Year	Competition	Location	Category	Snatch	Clean & jerk	Total	Rank
2019	European Championships	Batumi	102 kg	168 kg	209 kg	377 kg	2nd place, silver medalist(s)
2021	European Championships	Moscow	102 kg	176 kg	214 kg	390 kg	Template:Gold2
2022	European Championships	Tirana	102 kg	176 kg	214 kg	390 kg	2nd place, silver medalist(s)
2022	World Championships	Bogotá	102 kg	175 kg	214 kg	389 kg	3rd place, bronze medalist(s)
2023	European Championships	Yerevan	109 kg	175 kg	220 kg	395 kg	Template:Gold2
2024	European Championships	Sofia	102 kg	180 kg	216 kg	396 kg	2nd place, silver medalist(s)
