= Arayik Mirzoyan =

Armenian weightlifter (born 1987)

Medal record

Men's Weightlifting

Representing Armenia

European Championships
Silver medal – second place	2011 Kazan	-77 kg

Arayik Mirzoyan (born 29 July 1987 in Baghramian, Armenia) is an Armenian weightlifter. He won a silver medal at the 2011 European Weightlifting Championships. Both Mirzoyan and the gold medalist totaled 347 kg, but Mirzoyan took silver due to personal weight difference.
