= Ara Khachatryan =

Armenian weightlifter (born 1982)

Personal information
- Born: September 13, 1982 (age 43) Leninakan, Armenian SSR
- Height: 1.75 m (5 ft 9 in) (2012)
- Weight: 85 kg (187 lb) (2012)

Sport
- Country: Armenia
- Sport: Weightlifting
- Event: Men's 85 kg
Medal record
Men's Weightlifting
World Championships
Bronze medal – third place	2006 Santo Domingo	77 kg
European Championships
Silver medal – second place	2007 Strasbourg	77 kg
Silver medal – second place	2008 Lignano Sabbiadoro	77 kg
Silver medal – second place	2010 Minsk	85 kg

Ara Khachatryan (Armenian: Արա Խաչատրյան, born September 13, 1982) is an Armenian weightlifter.

== Biography ==
Ara Khachatryan was born on September 13, 1982, in Leninakan, Armenian SSR (now Gyumri, Armenia), a city well known for its weightlifters. Under personal trainer Alexan Karapetyan and coach Boghos Poghosyan, Ara began weight training from an early age.

Ara joined the Armenian national weightlifting team originally competing at a weight of 77 kg. At the 2006 World Weightlifting Championships in Santo Domingo, Khachatryan scored a total of 357 kg and won a bronze medal. Khachatryan won a silver medal at the 2007 European Weightlifting Championships in Strasbourg with a total of 361 kg, coming only behind compatriot Gevorg Davtyan. He repeated the silver medal the next year at the 2008 European Weightlifting Championships in Italy, scoring just 1 kg behind the gold medalist. In the same year, he went to the 2008 Summer Olympics in Beijing, where he finished in seventh place. Moving up to the 85 kg category in 2010, Khachatryan lifted a total of 368 kg at the 2010 European Weightlifting Championships to win his third European silver medal. Later that year Khachatryan competed at the 2010 World Weightlifting Championships, where, after winning the gold medal in the snatch, he received a serious arm injury and was forced to drop out from the competition. Khachatryan competed at the 2012 Summer Olympics, but was unable to set a total.

== Personal life ==
He is married and has a son and a daughter.

Khachatryan's mentor, Ashot Mkhitaryan, suddenly died of a heart attack on May 23, 2010.
