= 2010 European Weightlifting Championships =

International weightlifting competition

- Location: Minsk, Belarus
- Dates: 2–11 April

The 2010 European Weightlifting Championships was held in Minsk, Belarus from 2 April to 11 April 2010. It was the 89th edition of the event, which was first staged in 1896.

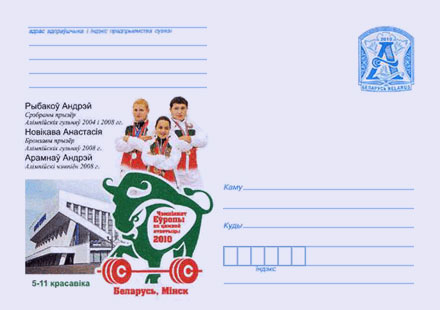
2010 European Weightlifting Championships on Stamped Postal Envelope of Belarus, 2010

== Medals tables ==
Ranking by all medals: "Big" (Total result) and "Small" (Snatch and Clean&Jerk)

* Host nation (Belarus)

Rank	Nation	Gold	Silver	Bronze	Total
1	Russia (RUS)	15	9	3	27
2	Armenia (ARM)	7	8	2	17
3	Turkey (TUR)	7	7	6	20
4	Belarus (BLR)*	6	3	6	15
5	Romania (ROU)	4	1	2	7
6	Poland (POL)	2	7	4	13
7	Ukraine (UKR)	1	2	6	9
8	Albania (ALB)	0	3	2	5
9	Bulgaria (BUL)	0	2	1	3
10	Moldova (MDA)	0	1	5	6
11	Belgium (BEL)	0	1	2	3
11	Germany (GER)	0	1	2	3
13	Spain (ESP)	0	0	3	3
14	Italy (ITA)	0	0	1	1
Totals (14 entries)		42	45	45	132

Ranking by "Big" (Total result) medals

* Host nation (Belarus)

Rank	Nation	Gold	Silver	Bronze	Total
1	Russia (RUS)	5	4	0	9
2	Turkey (TUR)	3	0	3	6
3	Armenia (ARM)	2	4	0	6
4	Belarus (BLR)*	2	1	3	6
5	Poland (POL)	1	2	1	4
6	Romania (ROU)	1	1	1	3
7	Ukraine (UKR)	0	1	2	3
8	Albania (ALB)	0	1	1	2
9	Bulgaria (BUL)	0	1	0	1
10	Belgium (BEL)	0	0	1	1
10	Germany (GER)	0	0	1	1
10	Moldova (MDA)	0	0	1	1
10	Spain (ESP)	0	0	1	1
Totals (13 entries)		14	15	15	44

== Medal overview ==
=== Men ===
Event		Gold		Silver		Bronze	
– 56 kg	Snatch	Vitali Dzerbianiou (BLR)	118 kg	Tom Goegebuer (BEL)	116 kg	Iuri Dudoglo (MDA)	115 kg
– 56 kg	Clean & Jerk	Smbat Margaryan (ARM)	146 kg EJR	Sedat Artuç (TUR)	139 kg	Tom Goegebuer (BEL)	138 kg
– 56 kg	Total	Vitali Dzerbianiou (BLR)	256 kg	Smbat Margaryan (ARM)	255 kg	Tom Goegebuer (BEL)	254 kg
– 62 kg	Snatch	Erol Bilgin (TUR)	139 kg	Bünyamin Sezer (TUR)	136 kg	Henadzi Makhveyenia (BLR)	136 kg
– 62 kg	Clean & Jerk	Antoniu Buci (ROU)	165 kg	Erol Bilgin (TUR)	165 kg	Oleg Sirghi (MDA)	160 kg
– 62 kg	Total	Erol Bilgin (TUR)	304 kg	Antoniu Buci (ROU)	300 kg	Henadzi Makhveyenia (BLR)	291 kg
– 69 kg	Snatch	Ninel Miculescu (ROU)	153 kg	Mete Binay (TUR)	149 kg	Mikhail Gobeev (RUS)	148 kg
– 69 kg	Clean & Jerk	Ninel Miculescu (ROU)	180 kg	Mikhail Gobeev (RUS)	171 kg	Alexandru Spac (MDA)	168 kg
– 69 kg	Total	Ninel Miculescu (ROU)	333 kg	Mikhail Gobeev (RUS)	319 kg	Mete Binay (TUR)	314 kg
– 77 kg	Snatch	Tigran Martirosyan (ARM)	165 kg	Krzysztof Szramiak (POL)	160 kg	Samet Keles (TUR)	158 kg
– 77 kg	Clean & Jerk	Tigran Martirosyan (ARM)	195 kg	Krzysztof Szramiak (POL)	191 kg	Erkand Qerimaj (ALB)	190 kg
– 77 kg	Total	Tigran Martirosyan (ARM)	360 kg	Krzysztof Szramiak (POL)	351 kg	Erkand Qerimaj (ALB)	344 kg
– 85 kg	Snatch	Mikalai Novikau (BLR)	171 kg	İzzet İnce (TUR)	170 kg	Ara Khachatryan (ARM)	165 kg
– 85 kg	Clean & Jerk	Gevorik Poghosyan (ARM)	204 kg	Ara Khachatryan (ARM)	203 kg	Yuriy Chykyda (UKR)	197 kg
– 85 kg	Total	Gevorik Poghosyan (ARM)	369 kg	Ara Khachatryan (ARM)	368 kg	Mikalai Novikau (BLR)	367 kg
– 94 kg	Snatch	Artem Ivanov (UKR)	180 kg	Arsen Kasabiev (POL)	176 kg	Evgheni Bratan (MDA)	170 kg
– 94 kg	Clean & Jerk	Arsen Kasabiev (POL)	216 kg	Antolii Ciricu (MDA)	208 kg	Arkadiusz Michalski (POL)	205 kg
– 94 kg	Total	Arsen Kasabiev (POL)	392 kg	Artem Ivanov (UKR)	383 kg	Antolii Ciricu (MDA)	376 kg
– 105 kg	Snatch	Vladimir Smorchkov (RUS)	193 kg	Dmitry Klokov (RUS)	185 kg	Mykola Hordiychuk (UKR)	180 kg
– 105 kg	Clean & Jerk	Dmitry Klokov (RUS)	224 kg	Oleksiy Torokhtiy (UKR)	221 kg	Artur Babayan (ARM)	216 kg
– 105 kg	Total	Dmitry Klokov (RUS)	409 kg	Vladimir Smorchkov (RUS)	408 kg	Oleksiy Torokhtiy (UKR)	396 kg
+105 kg	Snatch	Evgeny Chigishev (RUS)	205 kg	Ruben Aleksanyan (ARM)	195 kg	Almir Velagic (GER)	190 kg
+105 kg	Clean & Jerk	Ruben Aleksanyan (ARM)	237 kg	Matthias Steiner (GER)	236 kg	Evgeny Chigishev (RUS)	235 kg
+105 kg	Total	Evgeny Chigishev (RUS)	440 kg	Ruben Aleksanyan (ARM)	432 kg	Matthias Steiner (GER)	426 kg

=== Women ===
Event		Gold		Silver		Bronze	
– 48 kg	Snatch	Nurcan Taylan (TUR) (DQ)	90 kg	Marzena Karpińska (POL)	83 kg	Genny Pagliaro (ITA)	79 kg
– 48 kg	Clean & Jerk	Nurcan Taylan (TUR) (DQ)	118 kg ER	Marzena Karpińska (POL)	96 kg	Şaziye Okur (TUR)	95 kg
– 48 kg	Total	Nurcan Taylan (TUR) (DQ)	208 kg	Marzena Karpińska (POL)	179 kg	Şaziye Okur (TUR)	173 kg
– 53 kg	Snatch	Aylin Daşdelen (TUR)	88 kg	Valiantsi Liakhavets (BLR)	87 kg	Boyanka Kostova (BUL)	87 kg
– 53 kg	Clean & Jerk	Aylin Daşdelen (TUR)	120 kg ER	Boyanka Kostova (BUL)	112 kg	Valiantsi Liakhavets (BLR)	111 kg
– 53 kg	Total	Aylin Daşdelen (TUR)	208 kg	Boyanka Kostova (BUL)	199 kg	Valiantsi Liakhavets (BLR)	198 kg
– 58 kg	Snatch	Nastassia Novikava (BLR)	105 kg	Romela Begaj (ALB)	96 kg	Marieta Gotfryd (POL)	96 kg
– 58 kg	Clean & Jerk	Nastassia Novikava (BLR)	133 kg	Romela Begaj (ALB)	111 kg	Marieta Gotfryd (POL)	110 kg
– 58 kg	Total	Nastassia Novikava (BLR)	238 kg	Romela Begaj (ALB)	207 kg	Marieta Gotfryd (POL)	206 kg
– 63 kg	Snatch	Svetlana Tsarukaeva (RUS)	114 kg	Sibel Şimşek (TUR)	110 kg	Marina Shainova (RUS)	100 kg
– 63 kg	Clean & Jerk	Sibel Şimşek (TUR)	134 kg	Svetlana Tsarukaeva (RUS)	130 kg	Roxana Cocoș (ROU)	130 kg
– 63 kg	Total	Sibel Şimşek (TUR)	244 kg	Svetlana Tsarukaeva (RUS)	244 kg	Roxana Cocoș (ROU)	229 kg
– 69 kg	Snatch	Oxana Slivenko (RUS)	117 kg	Meline Daluzyan (ARM)	115 kg	Yuliya Artemova (UKR)	111 kg
– 69 kg	Clean & Jerk	Oxana Slivenko (RUS)	145 kg	Meline Daluzyan (ARM)	145 kg	Yuliya Artemova (UKR)	131 kg
– 69 kg	Total	Oxana Slivenko (RUS)	262 kg	Meline Daluzyan (ARM)	260 kg	Yuliya Artemova (UKR)	242 kg
– 75 kg	Snatch	Natalya Zabolotnaya (RUS)	129 kg	Nadezhda Evstyukhina (RUS)	127 kg	Lydia Valentín (ESP)	115 kg
– 75 kg	Clean & Jerk	Natalya Zabolotnaya (RUS)	156 kg	Nadezhda Evstyukhina (RUS)	155 kg	Lydia Valentín (ESP)	140 kg
– 75 kg	Total	Natalya Zabolotnaya (RUS)	285 kg	Nadezhda Evstyukhina (RUS)	282 kg	Lydia Valentín (ESP)	255 kg
+75 kg	Snatch	Tatiana Kashirina (RUS)	135 kg	Ümmühan Uçar (TUR)	117 kg	Volha Kniazhyshcha (BLR)	116 kg
+75 kg	Clean & Jerk	Tatiana Kashirina (RUS)	162 kg	Volha Kniazhyshcha (BLR)	141 kg	Ümmühan Uçar (TUR)	140 kg
+75 kg	Total	Tatiana Kashirina (RUS)	297 kg	Volha Kniazhyshcha (BLR)	257 kg	Ümmühan Uçar (TUR)	257 kg

== Doping cases ==
Additional information needed

=== Men ===
- Mikalai Cherniak from Belarus who won silver medal in snatch and bronze medal in total at the men's 77 kg category, tested positive after the competition.
- Rovshan Fatullayev from Azerbaijan who won 2 silver medals in the men's 94 kg (c&j and total) and a bronze medal in snatch, tested positive after the competition.
- Andrei Aramnau from Belarus who won 3 gold medal in all discipline at the men's 105 kg category, tested positive after the competition.
- Boyan Poleyanov from Bulgaria who originally finished 8th in snatch, 7th in c&j and 7th in total at the men's +105 kg category, tested positive after the competition.

=== Women ===
- Marina Ohman from Israel who originally finished 7th in snatch, 10th in c&j and 10th in total at the women's 63 kg category, tested positive after the competition.
- Shemshat Tuliayeva from Belarus who won 2 bronze medals at the women's 69 kg (snatch and total), tested positive after the competition.
- Hripsime Khurshudyan from Armenia who won 3 bronze medals in all discipline at the women's 75 kg category, tested positive after the competition.
- Olha Korobka from Ukraine who won 3 silver medals in all discipline at the women's +75 kg category, tested positive after the competition.
