= Anatolie Cîrîcu =

Moldovan weightlifter (born 1988)

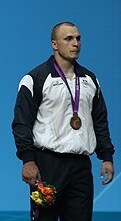

Personal information
- Born: 14 September 1988 (age 37) Cahul, Moldavian SSR, Soviet Union
- Height: 1.78 m (5 ft 10 in)
- Weight: 94 kg (207 lb; 14.8 st)

Sport
- Sport: Weightlifting
Medal record
Men's Weightlifting
Representing Moldova
Olympic Games
Disqualified	2012 London	–94 kg
European Championships
Gold medal – first place	2012 Antalya	–94 kg
Silver medal – second place	2011 Kazan	–94 kg

Anatolie Cîrîcu (born 14 September 1988) is a Moldovan weightlifter.

Cîrîcu is the champion of the 2012 European Weightlifting Championships for the 94 kg category. He also participated in the 2011 European Weightlifting Championships, where he won the silver medal.

== Doping ==
At the 2012 Summer Olympics he originally won the bronze medal in the men's 94kg category, lifting a total of 407 kg. On 27 July 2016, the IWF reported that, in the IOC's second wave of doping re-sampling, Cîrîcu had tested positive for the steroid dehydrochlormethyltestosterone. In November 2016, he was stripped of his Olympic medal. He is banned by the IWF until 11 May 2023.

== Achievements ==
Rank			Competition	Host	Result
S	C	T	Competition	Host	Result
Silver medal	Silver medal	Silver medal	2011 European Championships	(Russia) Kazan	173+217=390
Silver medal	Gold medal	Gold medal	2012 European Championships	(Turkey) Antalya	178+224=402
DSQ	DSQ	DSQ	2012 Olympic Games	(United Kingdom) London	181+226=407
