= Ruben Aleksanyan =

Armenian weightlifter (born 1990)

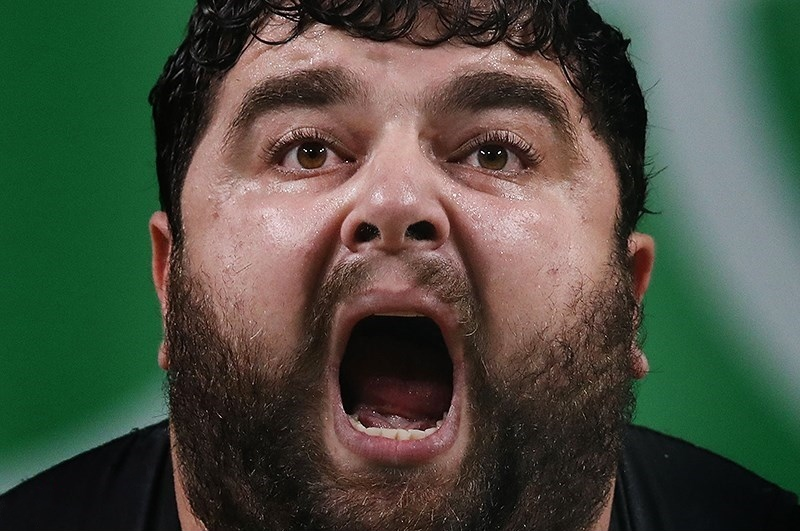
- Ruben Aleksanyan at 2016 Olympics

Personal information
- Nationality: Armenian
- Born: 14 March 1990 (age 36) Yerevan, Armenia
- Height: 1.80 m (5 ft 11 in)
- Weight: 153.85 kg (339.2 lb)

Sport
- Country: Armenia
- Sport: Weightlifting
- Event: +109 kg
Medal record
World Championships
Bronze medal – third place	2019 Pattaya	+109 kg
European Championships
Silver medal – second place	2010 Minsk	+105 kg
Silver medal – second place	2014 Tel Aviv	+105kg
Bronze medal – third place	2017 Split	+105 kg
Bronze medal – third place	2019 Batumi	+109 kg

Ruben Aleksanyan (Armenian: Ռուբեն Ալեքսանյան; born 14 March 1990) is an Armenian weightlifter. He won a gold medal at the 2009 U23 European Championships in Władysławowo, Poland, and a silver medal at the 2010 European Championships in Minsk, Belarus. He was still under twenty years of age when he lifted a combined total of 432 kg (195 kg in the snatch and 237 kg in the clean and jerk), which was a European Under-20 record, in losing to Evgeny Chigishev. He competed at the 2016 Summer Olympics in the Men's +105 kg.
