= 2009 World Weightlifting Championships – Women's 69 kg =

The women's competition in the light-heavyweight (– 69 kg) division was staged on November 27, 2009.

== Schedule ==
| Date | Time | Event |
|---|---|---|
| 27 November 2009 | 09:00 | Group B |
| 27 November 2009 | 16:00 | Group A |

== Medalists ==
| Event | Gold | | Silver | | Bronze | |
|---|---|---|---|---|---|---|
| Snatch | Nazik Avdalyan (ARM) | 119 kg | Oxana Slivenko (RUS) | 118 kg | Zhang Shaoling (MAC) | 112 kg |
| Clean & Jerk | Nazik Avdalyan (ARM) | 147 kg | Oxana Slivenko (RUS) | 146 kg | Zhang Shaoling (MAC) | 136 kg |
| Total | Nazik Avdalyan (ARM) | 266 kg | Oxana Slivenko (RUS) | 264 kg | Zhang Shaoling (MAC) | 248 kg |

== Records ==
Prior to this competition, the existing world records were as follows.

| World Record | Snatch | ~~Liu Chunhong (CHN)~~; Oxana Slivenko (RUS) | ~~128 kg~~ 123 kg | ~~Beijing, China~~; Santo Domingo, Dominican | ~~13 August 2008~~; 4 October 2006 |
| World Record | Clean & Jerk | ~~Liu Chunhong (CHN)~~; Zarema Kasaeva (RUS) | ~~158 kg~~ 157 kg | ~~Beijing, China~~; Doha, Qatar | ~~13 August 2008~~; 13 November 2005 |
| World Record | Total | ~~Liu Chunhong (CHN)~~; Oxana Slivenko (RUS) | ~~286 kg~~ 276 kg | ~~Beijing, China~~; Chiang Mai, Thailand | ~~13 August 2008~~; 24 September 2007 |

- Liu Chunhong's world records were rescinded in 2017.

== Results ==
| Rank | Athlete | Group | Body weight | Snatch (kg) | | | | Clean & Jerk (kg) | | | | Total |
| Rank | Athlete | Group | Body weight | 1 | 2 | 3 | Rank | 1 | 2 | 3 | Rank | Total |
|---|---|---|---|---|---|---|---|---|---|---|---|---|
| 1st place, gold medalist(s) | Nazik Avdalyan (ARM) | A | 68.74 | 115 | ~~119~~ | 119 | 1st place, gold medalist(s) | 141 | 147 | — | 1st place, gold medalist(s) | 266 |
| 2nd place, silver medalist(s) | Oxana Slivenko (RUS) | A | 68.35 | 112 | 116 | 118 | 2nd place, silver medalist(s) | 135 | 140 | 146 | 2nd place, silver medalist(s) | 264 |
| 3rd place, bronze medalist(s) | Zhang Shaoling (MAC) | A | 68.29 | 105 | 110 | 112 | 3rd place, bronze medalist(s) | 133 | 136 | ~~140~~ | 3rd place, bronze medalist(s) | 248 |
| 4 | Liu Chunhong (CHN) | A | 68.68 | ~~110~~ | 110 | ~~115~~ | 5 | 130 | 133 | 135 | 5 | 245 |
| 5 | Leydi Solís (COL) | A | 67.52 | ~~104~~ | 104 | ~~107~~ | 9 | 132 | 135 | ~~137~~ | 4 | 239 |
| 6 | Svetlana Shimkova (RUS) | A | 66.65 | ~~100~~ | 100 | 105 | 7 | 120 | 129 | 132 | 6 | 237 |
| 7 | Wang Ya-jhen (TPE) | A | 68.45 | 97 | 102 | 105 | 8 | 127 | 132 | ~~134~~ | 7 | 237 |
| 8 | Christine Girard (CAN) | A | 68.84 | 96 | 100 | 103 | 10 | 128 | 131 | 132 | 8 | 235 |
| 9 | Shemshat Tuliayeva (BLR) | A | 68.62 | 105 | 110 | ~~115~~ | 4 | 124 | ~~129~~ | ~~129~~ | 10 | 234 |
| 10 | Cinthya Domínguez (MEX) | A | 68.78 | 103 | 106 | 107 | 6 | 123 | 126 | ~~128~~ | 9 | 233 |
| 11 | Ewa Mizdal (POL) | A | 68.47 | 95 | 98 | ~~100~~ | 12 | 115 | ~~120~~ | 120 | 12 | 218 |
| 12 | Marie-Ève Beauchemin-Nadeau (CAN) | B | 68.94 | 94 | ~~97~~ | 97 | 13 | 118 | ~~121~~ | 121 | 11 | 218 |
| 13 | Yuliya Artemova (UKR) | B | 68.68 | 96 | ~~99~~ | 99 | 11 | 115 | 118 | ~~121~~ | 14 | 217 |
| 14 | Rika Saito (JPN) | B | 68.73 | ~~88~~ | 88 | ~~91~~ | 18 | 115 | ~~120~~ | 120 | 13 | 208 |
| 15 | Anett Goppold (GER) | B | 68.52 | 90 | 92 | 93 | 15 | ~~113~~ | 113 | ~~116~~ | 15 | 206 |
| 16 | Sarah Bertram (USA) | B | 68.75 | 85 | 87 | 89 | 17 | 104 | ~~107~~ | 107 | 17 | 196 |
| 17 | Natasha Perdue (GBR) | B | 66.48 | ~~86~~ | 86 | ~~90~~ | 20 | 105 | ~~109~~ | 109 | 16 | 195 |
| 18 | Yesenia Domínguez (DOM) | B | 68.33 | ~~85~~ | 85 | 90 | 16 | 105 | ~~108~~ | ~~108~~ | 18 | 195 |
| 19 | Annika Berntsson (SWE) | B | 68.34 | 84 | 87 | ~~89~~ | 19 | 103 | ~~106~~ | ~~106~~ | 19 | 190 |
| — | Ayano Tani (JPN) | B | 68.51 | 90 | 93 | ~~95~~ | 14 | ~~115~~ | ~~115~~ | ~~115~~ | — | — |
