= 2011 European Weightlifting Championships =

International weightlifting competition

- Venue: Basket-Hall Arena
- Location: Kazan, Russia
- Dates: 10–17 April
- Competitors: 275 from 36 nations

The 2011 European Weightlifting Championships was held in Kazan, Russia from 11 April to 17 April 2011. It was the 90th edition of the event, which was first staged in 1896.

== Medals tables ==
Ranking by all medals: "Big" (Total result) and "Small" (Snatch and Clean&Jerk)

* Host nation (Russia)

Rank	Nation	Gold	Silver	Bronze	Total
1	Russia*	22	11	3	36
2	Turkey	9	10	7	26
3	Belarus	3	1	4	8
4	Moldova	2	3	1	6
5	Ukraine	2	2	3	7
6	Romania	1	6	1	8
7	Armenia	1	2	2	5
8	Czech Republic	1	1	0	2
9	Lithuania	1	0	2	3
10	Georgia	0	4	0	4
11	Germany	0	2	4	6
12	Poland	0	1	4	5
13	Albania	0	1	2	3
13	Italy	0	1	2	3
15	Hungary	0	0	3	3
15	Spain	0	0	3	3
17	France	0	0	2	2
17	Slovakia	0	0	2	2
Totals (18 entries)		42	45	45	132

Ranking by "Big" (Total result) medals

* Host nation (Russia)

Rank	Nation	Gold	Silver	Bronze	Total
1	Russia*	8	4	0	12
2	Turkey	3	3	3	9
3	Moldova	1	1	0	2
3	Ukraine	1	1	0	2
5	Belarus	1	0	1	2
6	Romania	0	2	1	3
7	Germany	0	1	1	2
8	Armenia	0	1	0	1
8	Czech Republic	0	1	0	1
8	Georgia	0	1	0	1
11	Poland	0	0	2	2
12	Albania	0	0	1	1
12	France	0	0	1	1
12	Hungary	0	0	1	1
12	Italy	0	0	1	1
12	Lithuania	0	0	1	1
12	Slovakia	0	0	1	1
12	Spain	0	0	1	1
Totals (18 entries)		14	15	15	44

== Schedule ==
MONDAY 11, APRIL

- 10.00-11.30 Women / 48 kg / Group B
- 12.00-14.00 Men / 56 kg / Group B
- 16.00-16.30 OPENING CEREMONY
- 17.00-19.00 Women / 48 kg / Group A final
- 20.00-22.00 Men / 56 kg / Group A final

TUESDAY 12, APRIL

- 12.00-13.30 Women / 53 kg / Group B
- 14.00-16.00 Men / 62 kg / Group B
- 17.00-19.00 Women / 53 kg / Group A
- 20.00-22.00 Men / 62 kg / Group A

WEDNESDAY 13, APRIL

- 12.00-13.30 Women / 58 kg / Group B
- 14.00-16.00 Men / 69 kg / Group B
- 17.00-19.00 Women / 58 kg / Group A final
- 20.00-22.00 Men / 69 kg / Group A final

THURSDAY 14, APRIL

- 10.00-12.00 Men / 85 kg / Group C
- 12.00-13.30 Women / 63 kg / Group B
- 14.00-16.00 Men / 77 kg / Group B
- 17.00-19.00 Women / 63 kg / Group A
- 20.00-22.00 Men / 77 kg / Group A

FRIDAY 15, APRIL

- 10.00-11.30 Women / 69 kg / Group B
- 11.30-13.30 Men / 94 kg / Group B
- 14.00-16.00 Men / 85 kg / Group B
- 17.00-19.00 Women / 69 kg / Group A final
- 20.00-22.00 Men / 85 kg / Group A final

SATURDAY 16, APRIL

- 09.30-11.00 Women / 75 kg / Group B
- 11.00-13.00 Men / 105 kg / Group B
- 14.00-16.00 Men / 94 kg / Group A
- 17.00-19.00 Women / 75 kg / Group A
- 20.00-22.00 Men / 105 kg / Group A

SUNDAY 17, APRIL

- 09.30-11.00 Women / +75 kg / Group B
- 11.00-13.00 Men / +105 kg / Group B
- 14.00-16.00 Women / +75 kg / Group A final
- 17.00-19.00 Men / +105 kg / Group A final
- 20.30 CLOSING CEREMONY & BANQUET

== Medal overview ==
=== Men ===
Event		Gold		Silver		Bronze	
– 56 kg Details	Snatch	Gökhan Kılıç (TUR)	118 kg	Stanislau Chadovich (BLR)	118 kg	Ghenadie Dudoglo (MDA)	115 kg
– 56 kg Details	Clean & Jerk	Oleg Sîrghi (MDA)	150 kg	Florin Ionuț Croitoru (ROU)	141 kg	Smbat Margaryan (ARM)	141 kg
– 56 kg Details	Total	Oleg Sîrghi (MDA)	262 kg	Gökhan Kılıç (TUR)	256 kg	Florin Ionuț Croitoru (ROU)	256 kg
– 62 kg Details	Snatch	Bünyamin Sezer (TUR)	140 kg	Antoniu Buci (ROU)	134 kg	Damian Wiśniewski (POL)	130 kg
– 62 kg Details	Clean & Jerk	Marius Gîscan (ROU)	162 kg	Hurşit Atak (TUR)	161 kg	Bünyamin Sezer (TUR)	158 kg
– 62 kg Details	Total	Bünyamin Sezer (TUR)	298 kg	Antoniu Buci (ROU)	290 kg	Hurşit Atak (TUR)	289 kg
– 69 kg Details	Snatch	Mete Binay (TUR)	154 kg	Răzvan Martin (ROU)	150 kg	Vladislav Lukanin (RUS)	146 kg
– 69 kg Details	Clean & Jerk	Vladislav Lukanin (RUS)	186 kg	Răzvan Martin (ROU)	181 kg	Daniel Godelli (ALB)	176 kg
– 69 kg Details	Total	Vladislav Lukanin (RUS)	332 kg	Răzvan Martin (ROU)	331 kg	Daniel Godelli (ALB)	321 kg
– 77 kg Details	Snatch	Arayik Mirzoyan (ARM)	160 kg	Erkand Qerimaj (ALB)	157 kg	Semih Yağcı (TUR)	155 kg
– 77 kg Details	Clean & Jerk	Semih Yağcı (TUR)	192 kg	Arayik Mirzoyan (ARM)	187 kg	Richard Tkáč (SVK)	183 kg
– 77 kg Details	Total	Semih Yağcı (TUR)	347 kg	Arayik Mirzoyan (ARM)	347 kg	Richard Tkáč (SVK)	335 kg
– 85 kg Details	Snatch	Apti Aukhadov (RUS)	173 kg	Aleksey Yufkin (RUS)	170 kg	Edgar Gevorgyan (ARM)	165 kg
– 85 kg Details	Clean & Jerk	Aleksey Yufkin (RUS)	215 kg	Apti Aukhadov (RUS)	212 kg	Benjamin Hennequin (FRA)	208 kg
– 85 kg Details	Total	Aleksey Yufkin (RUS)	385 kg	Apti Aukhadov (RUS)	385 kg	Benjamin Hennequin (FRA)	373 kg
– 94 kg Details	Snatch	Aurimas Didžbalis (LTU)	177 kg	Anatolie Cîrîcu (MDA)	173 kg	Andrey Demanov (RUS)	171 kg
– 94 kg Details	Clean & Jerk	Andrey Demanov (RUS)	220 kg	Anatolie Cîrîcu (MDA)	217 kg	Aurimas Didžbalis (LTU)	205 kg
– 94 kg Details	Total	Andrey Demanov (RUS)	391 kg	Anatolie Cîrîcu (MDA)	390 kg	Aurimas Didžbalis (LTU)	382 kg
– 105 kg	Snatch	Khadzhimurat Akkaev (RUS)	195 kg	Gia Machavariani (GEO)	183 kg	Mikhail Audzeyeu (BLR)	181 kg
– 105 kg	Clean & Jerk	Khadzhimurat Akkaev (RUS)	230 kg	Gia Machavariani (GEO)	217 kg	Bartlomiej Bonk (POL)	214 kg
– 105 kg	Total	Khadzhimurat Akkaev (RUS)	425 kg	Gia Machavariani (GEO)	400 kg	Bartlomiej Bonk (POL)	394 kg
+ 105 kg	Snatch	Ihor Shymechko (UKR)	195 kg	Irakli Turmanidze (GEO)	188 kg	Yauheni Zharnasek (BLR)	187 kg
+ 105 kg	Clean & Jerk	Jiří Orság (CZE)	226 kg	Bünyamin Sudaş (TUR)	224 kg	Yauheni Zharnasek (BLR)	223 kg
+ 105 kg	Total	Ihor Shymechko (UKR)	412 kg	Jiří Orság (CZE)	410 kg	Yauheni Zharnasek (BLR)	410 kg

=== Women ===
Event		Gold		Silver		Bronze	
– 48 kg Details	Snatch	Nurcan Taylan (TUR) (DQ)	90 kg	Genny Pagliaro (ITA)	82 kg	Nurdan Karagöz (TUR)	80 kg
– 48 kg Details	Clean & Jerk	Nurcan Taylan (TUR) (DQ)	105 kg	Nurdan Karagöz (TUR)	100 kg	Genny Pagliaro (ITA)	98 kg
– 48 kg Details	Total	Nurcan Taylan (TUR) (DQ)	195 kg	Nurdan Karagöz (TUR)	180 kg	Genny Pagliaro (ITA)	180 kg
– 53 kg Details	Snatch	Aylin Daşdelen (TUR)	90 kg	Julia Rohde (GER)	83 kg	Mariya Vidlyvana (UKR)	83 kg
– 53 kg Details	Clean & Jerk	Aylin Daşdelen (TUR)	112 kg	Ayşegül Çoban (TUR)	105 kg	Julia Rohde (GER)	104 kg
– 53 kg Details	Total	Aylin Daşdelen (TUR)	202 kg	Julia Rohde (GER)	187 kg	Ayşegül Çoban (TUR)	180 kg
– 58 kg Details	Snatch	Nastassia Novikava (BLR)	100 kg	Iuliia Paratova (UKR)	92 kg	Yuliya Derkach (UKR)	88 kg
– 58 kg Details	Clean & Jerk	Nastassia Novikava (BLR)	125 kg	Aleksandra Klejnowska (POL)	110 kg	Iuliia Paratova (UKR)	108 kg
– 58 kg Details	Total	Nastassia Novikava (BLR)	225 kg	Iuliia Paratova (UKR)	200 kg	Aleksandra Klejnowska (POL)	196 kg
– 63 kg Details	Snatch	Svetlana Tsarukaeva (RUS)	112 kg	Sibel Şimşek (TUR)	108 kg	Marina Shainova (RUS)	104 kg
– 63 kg Details	Clean & Jerk	Marina Shainova (RUS)	141 kg	Svetlana Tsarukaeva (RUS)	133 kg	Sibel Şimşek (TUR)	130 kg
– 63 kg Details	Total	Marina Shainova (RUS)	245 kg	Svetlana Tsarukaeva (RUS)	245 kg	Sibel Şimşek (TUR)	238 kg
– 69 kg Details	Snatch	Oxana Slivenko (RUS)	120 kg	Tatiana Matveeva (RUS)	110 kg	Eszter Krutzler (HUN)	104 kg
– 69 kg Details	Clean & Jerk	Oxana Slivenko (RUS)	145 kg	Tatiana Matveeva (RUS)	141 kg	Eszter Krutzler (HUN)	127 kg
– 69 kg Details	Total	Oxana Slivenko (RUS)	265 kg	Tatiana Matveeva (RUS)	251 kg	Eszter Krutzler (HUN)	231 kg
– 75 kg Details	Snatch	Natalya Zabolotnaya (RUS)	133 kg	Nadezhda Evstyukhina (RUS)	130 kg	Lydia Valentin (ESP)	122 kg
– 75 kg Details	Clean & Jerk	Nadezhda Evstyukhina (RUS)	162 kg WR	Natalya Zabolotnaya (RUS)	153 kg	Lydia Valentin (ESP)	142 kg
– 75 kg Details	Total	Nadezhda Evstyukhina (RUS)	292 kg	Natalya Zabolotnaya (RUS)	286 kg	Lydia Valentin (ESP)	264 kg
+ 75 kg	Snatch	Tatiana Kashirina (RUS)	146 kg WR	Ümmühan Uçar (TUR)	113 kg	Kathleen Schöppe (GER)	100 kg
+ 75 kg	Clean & Jerk	Tatiana Kashirina (RUS)	181 kg	Ümmühan Uçar (TUR)	136 kg	Kathleen Schöppe (GER)	131 kg
+ 75 kg	Total	Tatiana Kashirina (RUS)	327 kg WR	Ümmühan Uçar (TUR)	249 kg	Kathleen Schöppe (GER)	231 kg
