= European Weightlifting Federation =

Weightlifting governing body in Europe

- Abbreviation: EWF
- Formation: 1969; 57 years ago
- Type: Federation of national associations
- Headquarters: Zurich, Switzerland
- Region served: Europe
- Members: 49 (46 Full Members, 3 Associate Members)
- President: (Kosovo) Astrit Hasani
- Affiliations: International Olympic Committee
- Website: ewf.sport

The European Weightlifting Federation (EWF) was founded in 1969, and is the body governing and organizing the European Weightlifting Championships. The EWF is a "recognized continental body" under the International Weightlifting Federation (IWF).

== History ==
Since 2024, the headquarters of the European Weightlifting Federation are located in Zurich, Switzerland.

Following the 2022 Russian invasion of Ukraine, the EWF took away from Russia the right to host the European Youth Weightlifting Championships in Russia in August 2022.

== Commissions ==
There are several Commissions of the EWF, including the Athletes Commission, Anti-Doping Commission, Fair Play Commission, Development Commission, and the Women Commission.

== Regions ==
Recognized by the IWF in 2021.

1. Commonwealth Weightlifting Federation (CWF) (1947): Commonwealth Weightlifting Championships
2. European Small Nations Weightlifting Federation (10 Members) : European Small Nations Weightlifting Championships
3. European Union Weightlifting Federation () : European Union Weightlifting Championships
4. Mediterranean Weightlifting Federation (2005) (12 Members): Mediterranean Weightlifting Championships
5. Nordic Weightlifting Federation (3 Members): Nordic Weightlifting Championships
6. Francophone Weightlifting Federation () : Francophone Weightlifting Championships
7. River Sava Weightlifting Federation (Central European Weightlifting Federation) (2013): River Sava Weightlifting Championships (Central European Weightlifting Championships)
8. Balkan Weightlifting Federation (re-establishment: 2024 - After many years of pause) (10 Members): 2025 Balkan Weightlifting Championships

== Events ==
=== Continental Championships ===
Number	Events	Recognized
1	European Weightlifting Championships	1896
2	European Union Weightlifting Championships	1973
3	European Union Weightlifting Cup	2014
4	European Espoir Weightlifting Championships (U23)	2009
5	European Junior Weightlifting Championships (U20)	1973
6	European Youth Weightlifting Championships (U17)	2003
7	European Cadet Weightlifting Championships (U15)	2013
8	European Masters Weightlifting Championships (35 to +80)	1992

=== International Championships ===
1. 51st "Challenge 210" Switzerland 2023
2. 57th Alpe Adria Championship Hungary 2023
3. Naim Süleymanoğlu Championship Turkey 2022
- European Masters Weightlifting Championship (Since 1990) organised by other organ not EWF.

== Members ==
There are 49 affiliated National Federations: 46 Full Members (FM) + 3 Associate Members (AM):

1. Albania
2. Armenia
3. Azerbaijan
4. Belgium
5. Bosnia and Herzegovina
6. Belarus
7. Bulgaria
8. Denmark
9. Germany
10. United Kingdom
11. Estonia
12. Finland
13. France
14. Georgia
15. Greece
16. Hungary
17. Ireland
18. Iceland
19. Israel
20. Italy
21. Kosovo
22. Croatia
23. Latvia
24. Lithuania
25. Luxembourg
26. Malta
27. Moldova
28. Monaco
29. Netherlands
30. Norway
31. Austria
32. Poland
33. Portugal
34. Cyprus
35. Romania
36. Russia
37. San Marino
38. Switzerland
39. Sweden
40. Serbia
41. Slovakia
42. Slovenia
43. Spain
44. Czech Republic
45. Turkey
46. Ukraine

1. Northern Ireland
2. Scotland
3. Wales

== See also ==
- International Weightlifting Federation
