= World record progression men's weightlifting (2018–2025) =

This is a list of world records progression in men's weightlifting from 2018 to 2025. These records are maintained in each weight class for the snatch lift, clean and jerk lift, and the total for both lifts.

The International Weightlifting Federation restructured its weight classes in 2018, nullifying earlier records and again in 2025.

== 55 kg ==
=== Snatch ===
Athlete	Record (kg)	Date	Meet	Place	Ref.
World Standard	135	1 November 2018	—	—	

=== Clean & Jerk ===
Athlete	Record (kg)	Date	Meet	Place	Ref.
World Standard	161	1 November 2018	—	—	
(North Korea) Om Yun-chol	162	2 November 2018	World Championships	Ashgabat	
(North Korea) Om Yun-chol	166	18 September 2019	World Championships	Pattaya	

=== Total ===
Athlete	Record (kg)	Date	Meet	Place	Ref.
World Standard	293	1 November 2018	—	—	
(North Korea) Om Yun-chol	294	18 September 2019	World Championships	Pattaya	

== 61 kg ==
=== Snatch ===
Athlete	Record (kg)	Date	Meet	Place	Ref.
World Standard	144	1 November 2018	—	—	
(China) Li Fabin	145	19 September 2019	World Championships	Pattaya	
(China) Li Fabin	146	2 April 2024	World Cup	Phuket	

=== Clean & Jerk ===
Athlete	Record (kg)	Date	Meet	Place	Ref.
World Standard	173	1 November 2018	—	—	
(Indonesia) Eko Yuli Irawan	174	3 November 2018	World Championships	Ashgabat	
(China) Li Fabin	175	7 December 2022	World Championships	Bogotá	
(United States) Hampton Morris	176	2 April 2024	World Cup	Phuket	

=== Total ===
Athlete	Record (kg)	Date	Meet	Place	Ref.
World Standard	312	1 November 2018	—	—	
(Indonesia) Eko Yuli Irawan	313	3 November 2018	World Championships	Ashgabat	
(Indonesia) Eko Yuli Irawan	317	3 November 2018	World Championships	Ashgabat	
(China) Li Fabin	318	19 September 2019	World Championships	Pattaya	

== 67 kg ==
=== Snatch ===
Athlete	Record (kg)	Date	Meet	Place	Ref.
World Standard	153	1 November 2018	—	—	
(China) Chen Lijun	154	21 April 2019	Asian Championships	Ningbo	
(China) Huang Minhao	155	6 July 2019	Olympics Test Event	Tokyo	

=== Clean & Jerk ===
Athlete	Record (kg)	Date	Meet	Place	Ref.
World Standard	184	1 November 2018	—	—	
(China) Chen Lijun	185	21 April 2019	Asian Championships	Ningbo	
(China) Chen Lijun	187	20 September 2019	World Championships	Pattaya	
(North Korea) Pak Jong-ju	188	20 September 2019	World Championships	Pattaya	
(North Korea) Ri Won-ju	189	4 April 2024	World Cup	Phuket	
(North Korea) Ri Won-ju	190	8 December 2024	World Championships	Manama	

=== Total ===
Athlete	Record (kg)	Date	Meet	Place	Ref.
World Standard	331	1 November 2018	—	—	
(China) Chen Lijun	332	4 November 2018	World Championships	Ashgabat	
(China) Chen Lijun	339	21 April 2019	Asian Championships	Ningbo	

== 73 kg ==
=== Snatch ===
Athlete	Record (kg)	Date	Meet	Place	Ref.
World Standard	160	1 November 2018	—	—	
(China) Shi Zhiyong	161	4 November 2018	World Championships	Ashgabat	
(China) Shi Zhiyong	164	4 November 2018	World Championships	Ashgabat	
(China) Shi Zhiyong	165	22 April 2019	Asian Championships	Ningbo	
(China) Shi Zhiyong	168	22 April 2019	Asian Championships	Ningbo	
(China) Shi Zhiyong	169	20 April 2021	Asian Championships	Tashkent	

=== Clean & Jerk ===
Athlete	Record (kg)	Date	Meet	Place	Ref.
World Standard	194	1 November 2018	—	—	
(South Korea) Won Jeong-sik	195	4 November 2018	World Championships	Ashgabat	
(China) Shi Zhiyong	196	4 November 2018	World Championships	Ashgabat	
(China) Shi Zhiyong	197	21 September 2019	World Championships	Pattaya	
(China) Shi Zhiyong	198	10 December 2019	World Cup	Tianjin	
(Indonesia) Rahmat Erwin Abdullah	200	9 December 2022	World Championships	Bogotá	
(Indonesia) Rahmat Erwin Abdullah	201	3 October 2023	Asian Games	Hangzhou	
(Indonesia) Rahmat Erwin Abdullah	202	6 February 2024	Asian Championships	Tashkent	
(Indonesia) Rahmat Erwin Abdullah	204	6 February 2024	Asian Championships	Tashkent	
(Indonesia) Rahmat Erwin Abdullah	205	11 May 2025	Asian Championships	Jiangshan	

=== Total ===
Athlete	Record (kg)	Date	Meet	Place	Ref.
World Standard	348	1 November 2018	—	—	
(China) Shi Zhiyong	352	4 November 2018	World Championships	Ashgabat	
(China) Shi Zhiyong	360	4 November 2018	World Championships	Ashgabat	
(China) Shi Zhiyong	362	22 April 2019	Asian Championships	Ningbo	
(China) Shi Zhiyong	363	21 September 2019	World Championships	Pattaya	
(China) Shi Zhiyong	364	28 July 2021	Olympic Games	Tokyo	
(Indonesia) Rizki Juniansyah	365	4 April 2024	World Cup	Phuket	

== 81 kg ==
=== Snatch ===
Athlete	Record (kg)	Date	Meet	Place	Ref.
World Standard	170	1 November 2018	—	—	
(China) Lü Xiaojun	172	5 November 2018	World Championships	Ashgabat	
(Egypt) Mohamed Ehab	173	5 November 2018	World Championships	Ashgabat	
(China) Lü Xiaojun	174	21 April 2021	Asian Championships	Tashkent	
(China) Li Dayin	175	21 April 2021	Asian Championships	Tashkent	

=== Clean & Jerk ===
Athlete	Record (kg)	Date	Meet	Place	Ref.
World Standard	206	1 November 2018	—	—	
(China) Lü Xiaojun	207	22 September 2019	World Championships	Pattaya	
(Bulgaria) Karlos Nasar	208	12 December 2021	World Championships	Tashkent	
(Indonesia) Rahmat Erwin Abdullah	209	11 September 2023	World Championships	Riyadh	

=== Total ===
Athlete	Record (kg)	Date	Meet	Place	Ref.
World Standard	368	1 November 2018	—	—	
(Egypt) Mohamed Ehab	369	5 November 2018	World Championships	Ashgabat	
(Egypt) Mohamed Ehab	373	5 November 2018	World Championships	Ashgabat	
(China) Lü Xiaojun	374	5 November 2018	World Championships	Ashgabat	
(China) Li Dayin	375	24 February 2019	World Cup	Fuzhou	
(China) Lü Xiaojun	376	22 September 2019	World Championships	Pattaya	
(China) Li Dayin	377	22 September 2019	World Championships	Pattaya	
(China) Lü Xiaojun	378	22 September 2019	World Championships	Pattaya	

== 89 kg ==
=== Snatch ===
Athlete	Record (kg)	Date	Meet	Place	Ref.
World Standard	179	1 November 2018	—	—	
(China) Li Dayin	180	10 May 2023	Asian Championships	Jinju	
(Bulgaria) Karlos Nasar	181	6 April 2024	World Cup	Phuket	
(Colombia) Yeison López	182	6 April 2024	World Cup	Phuket	
(Bulgaria) Karlos Nasar	183	11 December 2024	World Championships	Manama	

=== Clean & Jerk ===
Athlete	Record (kg)	Date	Meet	Place	Ref.
World Standard	216	1 November 2018	—	—	
(Italy) Antonino Pizzolato	217	2 June 2022	European Championships	Tirana	
(Bulgaria) Karlos Nasar	220	11 December 2022	World Championships	Bogotá	
(Bulgaria) Karlos Nasar	221	20 April 2023	European Championships	Yerevan	
(China) Tian Tao	222	10 May 2023	Asian Championships	Jinju	
(Bulgaria) Karlos Nasar	223	10 December 2023	IWF Grand Prix	Doha	
(Bulgaria) Karlos Nasar	224	9 August 2024	Olympic Games	Paris	

=== Total ===
Athlete	Record (kg)	Date	Meet	Place	Ref.
World Standard	387	1 November 2018	—	—	
(Italy) Antonino Pizzolato	392	2 June 2022	European Championships	Tirana	
(Bulgaria) Karlos Nasar	395	20 April 2023	European Championships	Yerevan	
(China) Li Dayin	396	10 May 2023	Asian Championships	Jinju	
(Bulgaria) Karlos Nasar	404	9 August 2024	Olympic Games	Paris	
(Bulgaria) Karlos Nasar	405	11 December 2024	World Championships	Manama	

== 96 kg ==
=== Snatch ===
Athlete	Record (kg)	Date	Meet	Place	Ref.
World Standard	185	1 November 2018	—	—	
(Iran) Sohrab Moradi	186	7 November 2018	World Championships	Ashgabat	
(Colombia) Lesman Paredes	187	14 December 2021	World Championships	Tashkent	
(Bulgaria) Karlos Nasar	188	19 April 2025	European Championships	Chișinău	

=== Clean & Jerk ===
Athlete	Record (kg)	Date	Meet	Place	Ref.
World Standard	225	1 November 2018	—	—	
(China) Tian Tao	226	7 November 2018	World Championships	Ashgabat	
(Iran) Sohrab Moradi	230	7 November 2018	World Championships	Ashgabat	
(China) Tian Tao	231	7 July 2019	Olympics Test Event	Tokyo	

=== Total ===
Athlete	Record (kg)	Date	Meet	Place	Ref.
World Standard	401	1 November 2018	—	—	
(Iran) Sohrab Moradi	409	7 November 2018	World Championships	Ashgabat	
(Iran) Sohrab Moradi	416	7 November 2018	World Championships	Ashgabat	
(Bulgaria) Karlos Nasar	417	19 April 2025	European Championships	Chișinău	

== 102 kg ==
=== Snatch ===
Athlete	Record (kg)	Date	Meet	Place	Ref.
World Standard	191	1 November 2018	—	—	

=== Clean & Jerk ===
Athlete	Record (kg)	Date	Meet	Place	Ref.
World Standard	231	1 November 2018	—	—	
(China) Liu Huanhua	232	8 April 2024	World Cup	Phuket	

=== Total ===
Athlete	Record (kg)	Date	Meet	Place	Ref.
World Standard	412	1 November 2018	—	—	
(China) Liu Huanhua	413	8 April 2024	World Cup	Phuket	

== 109 kg ==
=== Snatch ===
Athlete	Record (kg)	Date	Meet	Place	Ref.
World Standard	196	1 November 2018	—	—	
(China) Yang Zhe	197	26 September 2019	World Championships	Pattaya	
(Belarus) Andrei Aramnau	198	26 September 2019	World Championships	Pattaya	
(Armenia) Simon Martirosyan	199	26 September 2019	World Championships	Pattaya	
(China) Yang Zhe	200	24 April 2021	Asian Championships	Tashkent	

=== Clean & Jerk ===
Athlete	Record (kg)	Date	Meet	Place	Ref.
World Standard	237	1 November 2018	—	—	
(Armenia) Simon Martirosyan	240	9 November 2018	World Championships	Ashgabat	
(Uzbekistan) Ruslan Nurudinov	241	24 April 2021	Asian Championships	Tashkent	
(Uzbekistan) Ruslan Nurudinov	242	14 December 2024	World Championships	Manama	

=== Total ===
Athlete	Record (kg)	Date	Meet	Place	Ref.
World Standard	424	1 November 2018	—	—	
(Armenia) Simon Martirosyan	425	9 November 2018	World Championships	Ashgabat	
(Armenia) Simon Martirosyan	435	9 November 2018	World Championships	Ashgabat	

== +109 kg ==
=== Snatch ===
Athlete	Record (kg)	Date	Meet	Place	Ref.
World Standard	210	1 November 2018	—	—	
(Georgia (country)) Lasha Talakhadze	212	10 November 2018	World Championships	Ashgabat	
(Georgia (country)) Lasha Talakhadze	217	10 November 2018	World Championships	Ashgabat	
(Georgia (country)) Lasha Talakhadze	218	13 April 2019	European Championships	Batumi	
(Georgia (country)) Lasha Talakhadze	220	27 September 2019	World Championships	Pattaya	
(Georgia (country)) Lasha Talakhadze	222	11 April 2021	European Championships	Moscow	
(Georgia (country)) Lasha Talakhadze	223	4 August 2021	Olympic Games	Tokyo	
(Georgia (country)) Lasha Talakhadze	225	17 December 2021	World Championships	Tashkent	

=== Clean & Jerk ===
Athlete	Record (kg)	Date	Meet	Place	Ref.
World Standard	250	1 November 2018	—	—	
(Georgia (country)) Lasha Talakhadze	252	10 November 2018	World Championships	Ashgabat	
(Georgia (country)) Lasha Talakhadze	257	10 November 2018	World Championships	Ashgabat	
(Georgia (country)) Lasha Talakhadze	260	13 April 2019	European Championships	Batumi	
(Georgia (country)) Lasha Talakhadze	264	27 September 2019	World Championships	Pattaya	
(Georgia (country)) Lasha Talakhadze	265	4 August 2021	Olympic Games	Tokyo	
(Georgia (country)) Lasha Talakhadze	267	17 December 2021	World Championships	Tashkent	

=== Total ===
Athlete	Record (kg)	Date	Meet	Place	Ref.
World Standard	453	1 November 2018	—	—	
(Georgia (country)) Lasha Talakhadze	462	10 November 2018	World Championships	Ashgabat	
(Georgia (country)) Lasha Talakhadze	469	10 November 2018	World Championships	Ashgabat	
(Georgia (country)) Lasha Talakhadze	474	10 November 2018	World Championships	Ashgabat	
(Georgia (country)) Lasha Talakhadze	478	13 April 2019	European Championships	Batumi	
(Georgia (country)) Lasha Talakhadze	484	27 September 2019	World Championships	Pattaya	
(Georgia (country)) Lasha Talakhadze	485	11 April 2021	European Championships	Moscow	
(Georgia (country)) Lasha Talakhadze	488	4 August 2021	Olympic Games	Tokyo	
(Georgia (country)) Lasha Talakhadze	492	17 December 2021	World Championships	Tashkent	

== See also ==
- World record progression men's weightlifting (1998–2018)
- World record progression men's weightlifting (1993–1997)
- World record progression women's weightlifting
- World record progression women's weightlifting (1998–2018)
