= Weightlifting at the 2020 Summer Olympics – Men's 109 kg =

Men's 109 kg at the Games of the XXXII Olympiad
- Venue: Tokyo International Forum
- Date: 3 August 2021
- Competitors: 14 from 14 nations
- Winning total: 430 kg OR

Medalists
1st place, gold medalist(s)		Akbar Djuraev	Uzbekistan
2nd place, silver medalist(s)		Simon Martirosyan	Armenia
3rd place, bronze medalist(s)		Artūrs Plēsnieks	Latvia

The men's 109 kg weightlifting competitions at the 2020 Summer Olympics in Tokyo took place on 3 August, at the Tokyo International Forum. The weightlifter from Uzbekistan won the gold, with a combined lift of 430 kg.

== Records ==
Prior to this competition, the existing world and Olympic records were as follows.

World Record	Snatch	Yang Zhe (CHN)	200 kg	Tashkent, Uzbekistan	24 April 2021
World Record	Clean & Jerk	Ruslan Nurudinov (UZB)	241 kg	Tashkent, Uzbekistan	24 April 2021
World Record	Total	Simon Martirosyan (ARM)	435 kg	Ashgabat, Turkmenistan	9 November 2018
Olympic Record	Snatch	Olympic Standard	193 kg	—	1 November 2018
Olympic Record	Clean & Jerk	Olympic Standard	231 kg	—	1 November 2018
Olympic Record	Total	Olympic Standard	419 kg	—	1 November 2018

== Results ==
Rank	Athlete	Nation	Group	Body weight	Snatch (kg)				Clean & Jerk (kg)				Total
Rank	Athlete	Nation	Group	Body weight	1	2	3	Result	1	2	3	Result	Total
1st place, gold medalist(s)	Akbar Djuraev	Uzbekistan	A	109.00	~~189~~	189	193	193	227	~~234~~	237	237 OR	430 OR
2nd place, silver medalist(s)	Simon Martirosyan	Armenia	A	108.90	190	195	~~198~~	195 OR	228	~~238~~	~~238~~	228	423
3rd place, bronze medalist(s)	Artūrs Plēsnieks	Latvia	A	108.85	175	180	~~183~~	180	220	225	230	230	410
4	Timur Naniev	ROC	A	108.95	180	185	188	188	~~221~~	221	~~224~~	221	409
5	Hristo Hristov	Bulgaria	A	108.90	185	189	~~192~~	189	213	219	~~222~~	219	408
6	Jin Yun-seong	South Korea	A	107.30	180	~~185~~	~~185~~	180	220	~~225~~	~~230~~	220	400
7	Arkadiusz Michalski	Poland	A	108.60	175	~~179~~	~~179~~	175	216	—	—	216	391
8	Wesley Kitts	United States	A	108.35	173	~~177~~	177	177	~~213~~	213	~~220~~	213	390
9	Aymen Bacha	Tunisia	B	108.10	172	~~177~~	177	177	203	211	~~217~~	211	388
10	Öwez Öwezow	Turkmenistan	B	108.80	165	171	~~176~~	171	200	~~210~~	~~211~~	200	371
11	Arnas Šidiškis	Lithuania	B	105.35	151	156	~~160~~	156	182	187	~~190~~	187	343
12	Matthew Lydement	Australia	B	108.35	152	158	~~165~~	158	180	~~185~~	~~185~~	180	338
13	Tanumafili Jungblut	American Samoa	B	108.90	140	150	~~155~~	150	180	~~190~~	~~190~~	180	330
—	Ali Hashemi	Iran	A	108.80	177	181	184	184	~~226~~	~~226~~	~~228~~	—	—

== New records ==
Snatch	195 kg	Simon Martirosyan (ARM)	OR
Clean & Jerk	237 kg	Akbar Djuraev (UZB)	OR
Total	420 kg	Akbar Djuraev (UZB)	OR
Total	423 kg	Simon Martirosyan (ARM)	OR
Total	430 kg	Akbar Djuraev (UZB)	OR
