= 2023 World Weightlifting Championships – Men's 109 kg =

The men's 109 kilograms competition at the 2023 World Weightlifting Championships was held on 16 September 2023.

== Schedule ==
Date	Time	Event
16 September 2023	14:00	Group B
16 September 2023	19:00	Group A

== Medalists ==
Event	Gold		Silver		Bronze	
Snatch	Akbar Djuraev (UZB)	189 kg	Hristo Hristov (BUL)	181 kg	Dadash Dadashbayli (AZE)	180 kg
Clean & Jerk	Ruslan Nurudinov (UZB)	227 kg	Akbar Djuraev (UZB)	226 kg	Dadash Dadashbayli (AZE)	223 kg
Total	Akbar Djuraev (UZB)	415 kg	Ruslan Nurudinov (UZB)	407 kg	Dadash Dadashbayli (AZE)	403 kg

== Records ==
Prior to this competition, the existing world records were as follows.

World Record	Snatch	Yang Zhe (CHN)	200 kg	Tashkent, Uzbekistan	24 April 2021
World Record	Clean & Jerk	Ruslan Nurudinov (UZB)	241 kg	Tashkent, Uzbekistan	24 April 2021
World Record	Total	Simon Martirosyan (ARM)	435 kg	Ashgabat, Turkmenistan	9 November 2018

== Results ==
Rank	Athlete	Group	Snatch (kg)				Clean & Jerk (kg)				Total
Rank	Athlete	Group	1	2	3	Rank	1	2	3	Rank	Total
1st place, gold medalist(s)	Akbar Djuraev (UZB)	A	182	~~189~~	189	1st place, gold medalist(s)	220	226	~~231~~	2nd place, silver medalist(s)	415
2nd place, silver medalist(s)	Ruslan Nurudinov (UZB)	A	175	180	~~185~~	4	221	227	~~236~~	1st place, gold medalist(s)	407
3rd place, bronze medalist(s)	Dadash Dadashbayli (AZE)	A	175	180	~~184~~	3rd place, bronze medalist(s)	214	218	223	3rd place, bronze medalist(s)	403
4	Hristo Hristov (BUL)	A	176	181	~~184~~	2nd place, silver medalist(s)	205	211	~~215~~	8	392
5	Mehdi Karami (IRI)	A	173	~~178~~	~~181~~	7	~~214~~	216	~~223~~	4	389
6	Peyman Jan (IRI)	A	170	174	~~178~~	6	211	~~219~~	~~220~~	7	385
7	Zaza Lomtadze (GEO)	A	~~160~~	160	165	13	205	214	~~220~~	5	379
8	Óscar Garcés (COL)	A	165	~~170~~	~~172~~	12	205	210	213	6	378
9	Yeimar Mendoza (COL)	A	~~166~~	166	170	10	202	207	~~211~~	9	377
10	Josué Medina (MEX)	B	~~165~~	165	~~170~~	11	200	~~206~~	206	11	371
11	Wesley Kitts (USA)	B	160	165	170	9	191	200	—	13	370
12	Dong Bing-cheng (TPE)	B	160	~~165~~	~~169~~	15	~~200~~	200	206	10	366
13	Bartłomiej Adamus (POL)	B	~~160~~	160	~~166~~	16	200	~~206~~	~~207~~	12	360
14	Sargis Martirosjan (AUT)	B	165	~~170~~	171	8	180	~~187~~	~~191~~	18	351
15	Arnas Šidiškis (LTU)	B	150	155	159	17	180	185	~~190~~	15	344
16	Josef Kolář (CZE)	B	153	159	161	14	182	~~188~~	~~190~~	16	343
17	Jackson Roberts-Young (AUS)	B	~~144~~	144	~~152~~	20	194	~~200~~	~~207~~	14	338
18	Ali Al-Khazal (KSA)	B	145	150	—	19	175	181	—	17	331
19	António Vital e Silva (POR)	B	150	~~156~~	~~156~~	18	180	~~188~~	~~191~~	19	330
20	Sagar Bhandari (NEP)	B	117	123	128	21	155	163	~~167~~	20	291
—	Salwan Jasim (IRQ)	A	175	~~180~~	~~181~~	5	~~215~~	~~216~~	~~220~~	—	—
