= 2019 World Weightlifting Championships – Men's 109 kg =

The men's 109 kg competition at the 2019 World Weightlifting Championships was held on 25 and 26 September 2019.

== Schedule ==
| Date | Time | Event |
|---|---|---|
| 25 September 2019 | 22:30 | Group C |
| 26 September 2019 | 14:25 | Group B |
| 26 September 2019 | 17:55 | Group A |

== Medalists ==
| Event | Gold | | Silver | | Bronze | |
|---|---|---|---|---|---|---|
| Snatch | Simon Martirosyan (ARM) | 199 kg | Andrei Aramnau (BLR) | 198 kg | Yang Zhe (CHN) | 197 kg |
| Clean & Jerk | Simon Martirosyan (ARM) | 230 kg | Akbar Djuraev (UZB) | 229 kg | Andrei Aramnau (BLR) | 228 kg |
| Total | Simon Martirosyan (ARM) | 429 kg | Andrei Aramnau (BLR) | 426 kg | Yang Zhe (CHN) | 420 kg |

== Records ==
Prior to this competition, the existing world records were as follows.

| World Record | Snatch | World Standard | 196 kg | — | 1 November 2018 |
| World Record | Clean & Jerk | Simon Martirosyan (ARM) | 240 kg | Ashgabat, Turkmenistan | 9 November 2018 |
| World Record | Total | Simon Martirosyan (ARM) | 435 kg | Ashgabat, Turkmenistan | 9 November 2018 |

== Results ==
| Rank | Athlete | Group | Snatch (kg) | | | | Clean & Jerk (kg) | | | | Total |
| Rank | Athlete | Group | 1 | 2 | 3 | Rank | 1 | 2 | 3 | Rank | Total |
|---|---|---|---|---|---|---|---|---|---|---|---|
| 1st place, gold medalist(s) | Simon Martirosyan (ARM) | A | 190 | 195 | 199 WR | 1st place, gold medalist(s) | 230 | ~~241~~ | — | 1st place, gold medalist(s) | 429 |
| 2nd place, silver medalist(s) | Andrei Aramnau (BLR) | A | 188 | 193 | 198 WR | 2nd place, silver medalist(s) | 220 | 225 | 228 | 3rd place, bronze medalist(s) | 426 |
| 3rd place, bronze medalist(s) | Yang Zhe (CHN) | A | 187 | 192 | 197 WR | 3rd place, bronze medalist(s) | 217 | 223 | ~~227~~ | 5 | 420 |
| 4 | Akbar Djuraev (UZB) | A | ~~183~~ | 184 | 188 JWR | 6 | 221 | 226 JWR | 229 CJWR | 2nd place, silver medalist(s) | 417 CJWR |
| 5 | Rodion Bochkov (RUS) | A | 184 | 189 | ~~192~~ | 4 | 215 | 221 | 225 | 4 | 414 |
| 6 | Timur Naniev (RUS) | A | 180 | 185 | 189 | 5 | 220 | ~~224~~ | ~~224~~ | 9 | 409 |
| 7 | Ali Hashemi (IRI) | A | 177 | ~~182~~ | ~~182~~ | 9 | 218 | ~~226~~ | — | 13 | 395 |
| 8 | Arkadiusz Michalski (POL) | A | 173 | ~~177~~ | ~~178~~ | 14 | 221 | ~~224~~ | ~~225~~ | 6 | 394 |
| 9 | Artūrs Plēsnieks (LAT) | A | 173 | ~~178~~ | ~~180~~ | 15 | 215 | 221 | ~~226~~ | 7 | 394 |
| 10 | Ryunosuke Mochida (JPN) | B | 165 | 170 | 174 | 12 | 210 | 219 | ~~223~~ | 10 | 393 |
| 11 | Seo Hui-yeop (KOR) | B | ~~170~~ | 170 | ~~175~~ | 19 | 215 | ~~219~~ | 219 | 11 | 389 |
| 12 | Jeong Ki-sam (KOR) | B | 174 | 178 | ~~181~~ | 8 | 210 | ~~214~~ | ~~214~~ | 16 | 388 |
| 13 | Marcos Ruiz (ESP) | B | 173 | ~~178~~ | ~~178~~ | 13 | 205 | 211 | 215 | 14 | 388 |
| 14 | Wesley Kitts (USA) | B | 170 | ~~175~~ | ~~177~~ | 18 | 211 | 218 | ~~225~~ | 12 | 388 |
| 15 | Hiroaki Shiraishi (JPN) | B | 165 | ~~170~~ | ~~171~~ | 21 | 201 | 211 | 220 | 8 | 385 |
| 16 | Sargis Martirosjan (AUT) | B | 175 | ~~180~~ | ~~182~~ | 10 | 203 | ~~208~~ | 208 | 18 | 383 |
| 17 | Roman Zaitsev (UKR) | B | 170 | ~~174~~ | ~~174~~ | 17 | 207 | 212 | ~~220~~ | 15 | 382 |
| 18 | Jesús González (VEN) | B | ~~171~~ | ~~171~~ | 171 | 16 | ~~210~~ | 210 | ~~217~~ | 17 | 381 |
| 19 | Ibragim Bersanov (KAZ) | B | ~~175~~ | ~~175~~ | 175 | 11 | 201 | ~~205~~ | 205 | 19 | 380 |
| 20 | Jorge Arroyo (ECU) | C | ~~175~~ | 175 | 181 | 7 | 190 | ~~195~~ | 195 | 23 | 376 |
| 21 | Öwez Öwezow (TKM) | B | ~~165~~ | 165 | ~~173~~ | 22 | 203 | ~~210~~ | ~~210~~ | 20 | 368 |
| 22 | Arnas Šidiškis (LTU) | C | 156 | 161 | 165 | 20 | 190 | 195 | ~~200~~ | 22 | 360 |
| 23 | Owen Boxall (GBR) | C | 153 | 157 | ~~161~~ | 23 | 187 | 193 | ~~200~~ | 24 | 350 |
| 24 | Hannes Keskitalo (FIN) | C | 145 | ~~150~~ | ~~150~~ | 27 | 188 | 191 | 196 | 21 | 341 |
| 25 | Patrik Krywult (CZE) | C | 151 | 155 | ~~160~~ | 24 | ~~180~~ | 180 | ~~187~~ | 28 | 335 |
| 26 | Ryan Meidl (CAN) | C | ~~150~~ | ~~150~~ | 150 | 26 | ~~185~~ | 185 | ~~191~~ | 25 | 335 |
| 27 | Sean Rigsby (IRL) | C | 135 | ~~140~~ | 140 | 30 | 180 | 184 | ~~187~~ | 26 | 324 |
| 28 | Richard Davidson (CAN) | C | 140 | ~~145~~ | ~~146~~ | 29 | 182 | ~~187~~ | ~~190~~ | 27 | 322 |
| — | Ondrej Kružel (SVK) | C | 150 | ~~155~~ | ~~155~~ | 25 | ~~185~~ | — | — | — | — |
| — | Sio Pomelile (TGA) | C | 140 | 144 | ~~147~~ | 28 | ~~180~~ | ~~180~~ | ~~182~~ | — | — |
| — | Vasil Gospodinov (BUL) | A | ~~174~~ | ~~174~~ | ~~174~~ | — | — | — | — | — | — |
| — | Salwan Jasim (IRQ) | A | ~~182~~ | — | — | — | — | — | — | — | — |

== New records ==
| Snatch | 197 kg | Yang Zhe (CHN) | WR |
| Snatch | 198 kg | Andrei Aramnau (BLR) | WR |
| Snatch | 199 kg | Simon Martirosyan (ARM) | WR |
