= Weightlifting at the 2016 Summer Olympics – Men's 105 kg =

Men's 105 kg at the Games of the XXXI Olympiad
- Venue: Riocentro
- Date: 15 August 2016
- Competitors: 16 from 14 nations
- Winning total: 431 kg

Medalists
1st place, gold medalist(s)		Ruslan Nurudinov	Uzbekistan
2nd place, silver medalist(s)		Simon Martirosyan	Armenia
3rd place, bronze medalist(s)		Aleksandr Zaychikov	Kazakhstan

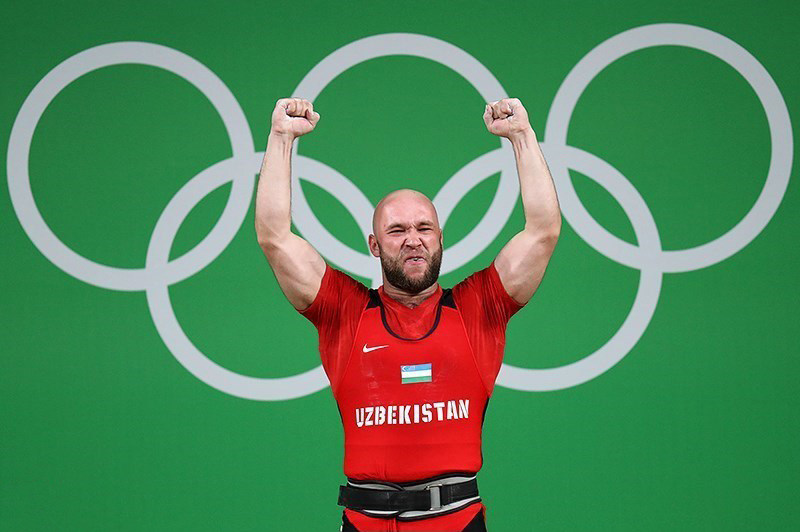

The Men's 105 kg weightlifting competitions at the 2016 Summer Olympics in Rio de Janeiro took place on 15 August at the Pavilion 2 of Riocentro.

== Schedule ==
All times are Time in Brazil (UTC-03:00)

Date	Time	Event
15 August 2016	15:30	Group B
15 August 2016	19:00	Group A

== Records ==
Prior to this competition, the existing world and Olympic records were as follows.

World record	Snatch	Andrei Aramnau (BLR)	200 kg	Beijing, China	18 August 2008
World record	Clean & Jerk	Ilya Ilyin (KAZ)	246 kg	Grozny, Russia	12 December 2015
World record	Total	Ilya Ilyin (KAZ)	437 kg	Grozny, Russia	12 December 2015
Olympic record	Snatch	Andrei Aramnau (BLR)	200 kg	Beijing, China	18 August 2008
Olympic record	Clean & Jerk	Andrei Aramnau (BLR)	236 kg	Beijing, China	18 August 2008
Olympic record	Total	Andrei Aramnau (BLR)	436 kg	Beijing, China	18 August 2008

== Results ==
Rank	Athlete	Group	Body weight	Snatch (kg)				Clean & Jerk (kg)				Total
Rank	Athlete	Group	Body weight	1	2	3	Result	1	2	3	Result	Total
1st place, gold medalist(s)	Ruslan Nurudinov (UZB)	A	104.96	190	194	~~197~~	194	225	230	237	237 OR	431
2nd place, silver medalist(s)	Simon Martirosyan (ARM)	A	104.63	185	190	~~195~~	190	220	227	~~234~~	227	417
3rd place, bronze medalist(s)	Aleksandr Zaychikov (KAZ)	A	104.51	185	190	193	193	223	~~227~~	~~227~~	223	416
4	Yang Zhe (CHN)	A	104.59	190	~~195~~	~~197~~	190	220	225	~~227~~	225	415
5	Ivan Efremov (UZB)	A	104.90	185	189	194	194	210	~~218~~	220	220	414
6	Mohammad Reza Barari (IRI)	A	104.65	180	~~185~~	186	186	220	~~230~~	~~231~~	220	406
7	Arkadiusz Michalski (POL)	A	104.77	175	~~179~~	179	179	221	~~228~~	~~228~~	221	400
8	Artūrs Plēsnieks (LAT)	A	103.99	176	~~180~~	181	181	218	~~223~~	~~225~~	218	399
9	Salwan Jassim Abbood (IRQ)	B	103.80	175	180	~~182~~	180	214	~~219~~	~~219~~	214	394
10	Jürgen Spieß (GER)	B	104.51	170	~~174~~	~~175~~	170	210	~~220~~	220	220	390
11	Sargis Martirosjan (AUT)	B	104.19	179	~~184~~	~~184~~	179	201	208	210	210	389
12	Gaber Mohamed (EGY)	B	104.98	166	171	173	173	204	~~208~~	–	204	377
13	Hernán Viera (PER)	B	103.85	142	147	151	151	193	197	200	200	351
14	David Katoatau (KIR)	B	104.58	135	140	145	145	195	204	~~208~~	204	349
–	Bartłomiej Bonk (POL)	A	104.07	~~180~~	180	185	185	~~215~~	~~216~~	~~218~~	–	DNF
–	Giorgi Chkheidze (GEO)	B	104.74	165	170	~~173~~	170	~~205~~	~~205~~	~~208~~	–	DNF
–	Mateus Gregório (BRA)	B	104.47	165	170	~~175~~	170	~~200~~	~~200~~	~~200~~	–	DNF

== New records ==
Clean & Jerk	237 kg	Ruslan Nurudinov (UZB)	OR
