= Simon Martirosyan =

Armenian weightlifter (born 1997)

Personal information
- Nationality: Armenian
- Born: 17 February 1997 (age 29) Haykashen, Armenia
- Height: 1.81 m (5 ft 11 in)
- Weight: 128.0 kg (282 lb)

Sport
- Country: Armenia
- Sport: Weightlifting
- Event: +109 kg

Achievements and titles
- Personal bests: –109 kg: Snatch: 199 kg (2019); Clean and jerk: 240 kg (2018); Total: 435 kg (2018, CWR); +109 kg: Snatch: 200 kg (2023); Clean and jerk: 250 kg (2023); Total: 450 kg (2023)
Medal record
Men's weightlifting
Representing Armenia
Olympic Games
Silver medal – second place	2016 Rio de Janeiro	105 kg
Silver medal – second place	2020 Tokyo	109 kg
World Championships
Gold medal – first place	2018 Ashgabat	109 kg
Gold medal – first place	2019 Pattaya	109 kg
Bronze medal – third place	2021 Tashkent	109 kg
European Championships
Gold medal – first place	2017 Split	105 kg
Gold medal – first place	2019 Batumi	109 kg
Silver medal – second place	2024 Sofia	+109 kg
Silver medal – second place	2025 Chișinău	109 kg
Bronze medal – third place	2016 Førde	105 kg
Bronze medal – third place	2023 Yerevan	+109 kg
Youth Olympic Games
Gold medal – first place	2014 Nanjing	+85 kg

Simon Martirosyan (Armenian: Սիմոն Մարտիրոսյան; born 17 February 1997) is an Armenian weightlifter, Olympian, two-time world champion, and two-time European champion competing in the 105 kg category until 2018 and 109 kg starting in 2018 after the International Weightlifting Federation reorganized the categories.

== Career ==
He held the youth world record for the snatch, the clean and jerk and total in the +94 kg division before weight classes were changed in 2018 nullifying earlier records. He is currently the world record holder in the Total for the −109 kg division.

In 2014 Martirosyan competed at the 2014 Summer Youth Olympics winning a gold medal in the +85 kg category.

=== Olympics ===
He competed for Armenia in the 2016 Summer Olympics, where he won the silver medal in the men's 105 kg competition.

=== World Championships ===
In 2018 the International Weightlifting Federation reorganized the categories nullifying earlier records, and coming into the competition it was suspected to be a close race between Ruslan Nurudinov (gold medalist at the 2016 Summer Olympics), and Yang Zhe (4th place at the 2016 Summer Olympics). After the snatch portion of the competition, Ruslan Nurudinov was out of the running for a total (as he did not complete a lift), and Yang Zhe was leading Martirosyan by 1 kg. In the clean & jerk portion of the competition, Martirosyan was the last lifter to begin lifting, and with his first lift of 230 kg he was in first place. After Nurudinov was unable to complete his next lift of 238 kg, Martirosyan attempted and made a 240 kg clean & jerk, setting new world records in the clean & jerk and total, and winning the gold medal.

He competed at the 2019 World Weightlifting Championships in the 109 kg category after a convincing win at the 2019 European Weightlifting Championships. He competed against silver medalist in the previous championships (Yang Zhe) and 2008 Olympic Champion (Andrei Aramnau). During the snatch competition Zhe, Aramnau and Martirosyan had their third snatch attempts in succession completed a world record lift each time. Zhe completed a 197 kg snatch, Aramnau with a 198 kg snatch and finally Martirosyan with a 199 kg lift. During the clean & jerk portion Martirosyan was the last lifter to make an attempt and with his lift of 230 kg he secured the gold medal in the clean & jerk and total.

In 2021, he won the bronze medal in the men's 109 kg event at the 2021 World Weightlifting Championships held in Tashkent, Uzbekistan.

=== European Championships ===
In 2016 he competed at the 2016 European Weightlifting Championships and won a bronze medal in 105 kg category. The following year he competed at the 2017 European Weightlifting Championships in Split, Croatia in the 105 kg category. He won gold medals in the snatch, clean & jerk and total, outlifting silver medalist Vasil Gospodinov by 17 kg. He returned to the European Weightlifting Championships in 2019 and swept gold medals and finished with a total of 427 kg, 16 kg over Andrei Aramnau.

== Major results ==
Year	Venue	Weight	Snatch (kg)				Clean & Jerk (kg)				Total	Rank
Year	Venue	Weight	1	2	3	Rank	1	2	3	Rank	Total	Rank
Olympic Games
2016	Rio de Janeiro, Brazil	105 kg	185	190	~~195~~	—N/a	220	227	~~234~~	—N/a	417	2nd place, silver medalist(s)
2020	Tokyo, Japan	109 kg	190	195 OR	~~198~~	—N/a	228	~~238~~	~~238~~	—N/a	423	2nd place, silver medalist(s)
World Championships
2014	Almaty, Kazakhstan	105 kg	178	~~183~~	183	5	213	~~220~~	~~221~~	11	396	7
2015	Houston, United States	105 kg	180	186	~~191~~	3rd place, bronze medalist(s)	~~216~~	~~216~~	216	8	402	5
2018	Ashgabat, Turkmenistan	109 kg	190	195	~~197~~	2nd place, silver medalist(s)	230	240 WR	—	1st place, gold medalist(s)	435 CWR	1st place, gold medalist(s)
2019	Pattaya, Thailand	109 kg	190	195	199 WR	1st place, gold medalist(s)	230	~~241~~	–	1st place, gold medalist(s)	429	1st place, gold medalist(s)
2021	Tashkent, Uzbekistan	109 kg	188	~~193~~	~~196~~	2nd place, silver medalist(s)	228	~~237~~	~~237~~	3rd place, bronze medalist(s)	416	3rd place, bronze medalist(s)
2022	Bogotá, Colombia	+109 kg	~~190~~	190	~~200~~	10	235	~~240~~	~~240~~	8	425	8
2023	Riyadh, Saudi Arabia	+109 kg	195	200	~~205~~	6	240	250	~~255~~	2nd place, silver medalist(s)	450	5
European Championships
2015	Tbilisi, Georgia	105 kg	~~180~~	~~180~~	181	4	210	216	~~221~~	5	397	4
2016	Førde, Norway	105 kg	182	~~184~~	~~185~~	2nd place, silver medalist(s)	215	220	~~225~~	3rd place, bronze medalist(s)	402	3rd place, bronze medalist(s)
2017	Split, Croatia	105 kg	184	~~190~~	~~190~~	1st place, gold medalist(s)	~~220~~	220	230	1st place, gold medalist(s)	414	1st place, gold medalist(s)
2019	Batumi, Georgia	109 kg	187	192	~~197~~	1st place, gold medalist(s)	225	235	—	1st place, gold medalist(s)	427	1st place, gold medalist(s)
2021	Moscow, Russia	109 kg	~~190~~	~~190~~	190	1st place, gold medalist(s)	~~227~~	~~227~~	~~227~~	—	—	—
2023	Yerevan, Armenia	+109 kg	190	195	~~200~~	3rd place, bronze medalist(s)	235	245	—	3rd place, bronze medalist(s)	440	3rd place, bronze medalist(s)
2024	Sofia, Bulgaria	+109 kg	190	~~200~~	~~200~~	3rd place, bronze medalist(s)	241	247	~~255~~	2nd place, silver medalist(s)	437	2nd place, silver medalist(s)
2025	Chișinău, Moldova	109 kg	~~176~~	~~181~~	181	2nd place, silver medalist(s)	213	~~225~~	225	2nd place, silver medalist(s)	406	2nd place, silver medalist(s)
2026	Batumi, Georgia	110 kg	~~183~~	183	~~190~~	4	215	~~230~~	—	6	398	6
IWF World Cup
2024	Phuket, Thailand	+109 kg	195	~~202~~	~~202~~	5	245	~~253~~	~~253~~	4	440	4
