= 2021 World Weightlifting Championships – Men's 109 kg =

Weightlifting Championship

The men's 109 kilograms competition at the 2021 World Weightlifting Championships was held on 16 December 2021.

== Schedule ==
Date	Time	Event
16 December 2021	13:00	Group B
16 December 2021	16:00	Group A

== Medalists ==
Event	Gold		Silver		Bronze	
Snatch	Akbar Djuraev (UZB)	195 kg	Simon Martirosyan (ARM)	188 kg	Ruslan Nurudinov (UZB)	185 kg
Clean & Jerk	Akbar Djuraev (UZB)	238 kg	Ruslan Nurudinov (UZB)	236 kg	Simon Martirosyan (ARM)	228 kg
Total	Akbar Djuraev (UZB)	433 kg AR	Ruslan Nurudinov (UZB)	421 kg	Simon Martirosyan (ARM)	416 kg

== Records ==
Prior to this competition, the existing world records were as follows.

World record	Snatch	Yang Zhe (CHN)	200 kg	Tashkent, Uzbekistan	24 April 2021
World record	Clean & Jerk	Ruslan Nurudinov (UZB)	241 kg	Tashkent, Uzbekistan	24 April 2021
World record	Total	Simon Martirosyan (ARM)	435 kg	Ashgabat, Turkmenistan	9 November 2018

== Results ==
Rank	Athlete	Group	Snatch (kg)				Clean & Jerk (kg)				Total
Rank	Athlete	Group	1	2	3	Rank	1	2	3	Rank	Total
1st place, gold medalist(s)	Akbar Djuraev (UZB)	A	187	192	195	1st place, gold medalist(s)	226	232	238	1st place, gold medalist(s)	433; AR
2nd place, silver medalist(s)	Ruslan Nurudinov (UZB)	A	~~185~~	185	~~189~~	3rd place, bronze medalist(s)	227	236	~~242~~	2nd place, silver medalist(s)	421
3rd place, bronze medalist(s)	Simon Martirosyan (ARM)	A	188	~~193~~	~~196~~	2nd place, silver medalist(s)	228	~~237~~	~~237~~	3rd place, bronze medalist(s)	416
4	Hristo Hristov (BUL)	A	170	176	178	5	200	206	210	6	388
5	Ian Wilson (USA)	A	170	175	~~178~~	6	205	210	~~214~~	5	385
6	Amir Azizi (IRI)	A	166	171	~~176~~	8	198	208	~~218~~	8	379
7	Alireza Soleimani (IRI)	A	~~172~~	172	179	4	195	~~206~~	~~206~~	11	374
8	Ryunosuke Mochida (JPN)	A	165	~~172~~	~~172~~	9	208	~~215~~	~~215~~	7	373
9	Sargis Martirosjan (AUT)	A	~~172~~	~~172~~	173	7	~~195~~	195	—	12	368
10	Junior Ngadja Nyabeyeu (CMR)	B	150	156	160	11	195	200	~~205~~	9	360
11	Hannes Keskitalo (FIN)	B	145	150	~~155~~	14	~~187~~	188	199	10	349
12	Lovepreet Singh (IND)	B	151	157	161	10	180	~~186~~	187	16	348
13	Stefan Ågren (SWE)	A	~~155~~	155	~~160~~	12	190	~~200~~	~~202~~	14	345
14	Jackson Roberts-Young (AUS)	B	~~145~~	~~145~~	145	17	188	192	~~204~~	13	337
15	Richard Davidson (CAN)	B	140	144	148	15	183	188	~~196~~	15	336
16	Noah Santavy (CAN)	B	147	151	~~155~~	13	182	~~186~~	~~187~~	18	333
17	Hanzala Dastgir Butt (PAK)	B	145	~~150~~	~~150~~	16	~~182~~	182	~~192~~	19	327
18	Linas Kvietkauskis (LTU)	B	~~135~~	135	~~141~~	18	175	~~181~~	~~181~~	20	310
—	Rafael Cerro (COL)	A	~~165~~	~~165~~	~~165~~	—	202	210	~~216~~	4	—
—	Arnas Šidiškis (LTU)	B	~~155~~	~~155~~	~~155~~	—	~~185~~	185	~~190~~	17	—
—	Jiří Gasior (CZE)	B	—	—	—	—	—	—	—	—	—
