= 2018 World Weightlifting Championships – Men's 109 kg =

The men's 109 kg competition at the 2018 World Weightlifting Championships was held on 8–9 November 2018.

The International Weightlifting Federation had reorganized the weight categories and discarded all prior world records; only performances exceeding defined "world standards" were to count as new records.

== Schedule ==
Date	Time	Event
8 November 2018	10:00	Group C
9 November 2018	14:25	Group B
9 November 2018	17:25	Group A

== Medalists ==
Event	Gold		Silver		Bronze	
Snatch	Yang Zhe (CHN)	196 kg	Simon Martirosyan (ARM)	195 kg	Rodion Bochkov (RUS)	190 kg
Clean & Jerk	Simon Martirosyan (ARM)	240 kg	Arkadiusz Michalski (POL)	228 kg	Ruslan Nurudinov (UZB)	227 kg
Total	Simon Martirosyan (ARM)	435 kg	Yang Zhe (CHN)	419 kg	Arkadiusz Michalski (POL)	403 kg

== Records ==
Prior to this competition, the existing world records were as follows.

World Record	Snatch	World Standard	196 kg	—	1 November 2018
World Record	Clean & Jerk	World Standard	237 kg	—	1 November 2018
World Record	Total	World Standard	424 kg	—	1 November 2018

== Results ==
Rank	Athlete	Group	Snatch (kg)				Clean & Jerk (kg)				Total
Rank	Athlete	Group	1	2	3	Rank	1	2	3	Rank	Total
1st place, gold medalist(s)	Simon Martirosyan (ARM)	A	190	195	~~197~~	2nd place, silver medalist(s)	230	240 WR	—	1st place, gold medalist(s)	435 CWR
2nd place, silver medalist(s)	Yang Zhe (CHN)	A	186	191	196	1st place, gold medalist(s)	215	220	223	4	419
3rd place, bronze medalist(s)	Arkadiusz Michalski (POL)	A	175	~~179~~	~~179~~	15	221	228	—	2nd place, silver medalist(s)	403
4	Salwan Jasim (IRQ)	A	~~180~~	180	~~183~~	9	222	~~226~~	~~226~~	6	402
5	Rodion Bochkov (RUS)	A	179	184	190	3rd place, bronze medalist(s)	210	~~216~~	~~218~~	15	400
6	Mohammad Reza Barari (IRI)	A	175	181	~~186~~	6	~~215~~	215	~~226~~	11	396
7	Seo Hui-yeop (KOR)	B	170	175	~~180~~	13	210	220	~~227~~	7	395
8	Vasil Gospodinov (BUL)	A	176	~~182~~	~~182~~	11	~~217~~	217	~~221~~	9	393
9	Andrei Aramnau (BLR)	A	175	~~181~~	182	5	210	~~215~~	~~215~~	16	392
10	Artūrs Plēsnieks (LAT)	B	169	~~173~~	174	16	210	217	~~222~~	8	391
11	Jeong Ki-sam (KOR)	B	170	~~180~~	180	8	200	~~210~~	210	13	390
12	Wes Kitts (USA)	B	168	~~174~~	~~174~~	18	208	215	222	5	390
13	Sargis Martirosjan (AUT)	A	~~178~~	~~179~~	179	10	~~205~~	205	210	17	389
14	Ibragim Bersanov (KAZ)	B	175	180	~~185~~	7	200	205	208	18	388
15	Georgi Shikov (BUL)	A	175	~~180~~	~~180~~	14	210	~~219~~	~~221~~	14	385
16	Jorge Arroyo (ECU)	B	~~178~~	178	183	4	196	201	~~203~~	22	384
17	Marcos Ruiz (ESP)	B	170	175	~~180~~	12	195	202	207	19	382
18	Hiroaki Shiraishi (JPN)	B	160	~~165~~	165	20	~~205~~	~~205~~	205	21	370
19	Ryunosuke Mochida (JPN)	B	~~160~~	160	~~165~~	23	205	210	~~215~~	12	370
20	Nenad Kužić (SRB)	C	160	165	~~170~~	19	200	~~210~~	~~212~~	23	365
21	Richmond Osarfo (GHA)	C	155	~~160~~	160	22	195	200	205	20	365
22	Josué Medina (MEX)	C	~~160~~	160	163	21	~~191~~	~~191~~	191	25	354
23	Radoslav Tatarčík (SVK)	B	165	169	171	17	~~180~~	180	~~184~~	30	351
24	Jiří Gasior (CZE)	C	150	154	~~157~~	27	190	194	~~201~~	24	348
25	Matthäus Hofmann (GER)	C	157	~~162~~	~~162~~	25	183	188	190	26	347
26	Sergej Lichovoj (LTU)	C	153	158	~~162~~	24	184	~~189~~	~~189~~	28	342
27	Sio Pomelile (TGA)	C	140	~~145~~	~~145~~	31	180	186	~~200~~	27	326
28	Mikkel Andersen (DEN)	C	~~147~~	147	~~151~~	28	~~177~~	~~177~~	177	31	324
29	Jackson Roberts-Young (AUS)	C	~~135~~	135	138	32	~~183~~	184	~~189~~	29	322
30	Ondrej Kružel (SVK)	C	145	~~149~~	—	29	175	~~180~~	~~180~~	32	320
31	Jani Heikkinen (FIN)	C	137	~~141~~	141	30	172	~~177~~	~~177~~	33	313
—	Sanele Mao (SAM)	C	150	155	~~160~~	26	~~196~~	~~196~~	~~196~~	—	—
—	Ruslan Nurudinov (UZB)	A	~~187~~	~~189~~	~~189~~	—	222	227	~~238~~	3rd place, bronze medalist(s)	—
—	Jesús González (VEN)	A	~~174~~	~~175~~	~~175~~	—	212	216	~~220~~	10	—

== New records ==
Clean & Jerk	240 kg	Simon Martirosyan (ARM)	WR
Total	425 kg	Simon Martirosyan (ARM)	WR
Total	435 kg	Simon Martirosyan (ARM)	WR
