= Owez =

Owez can refer to:

- Offshore Windpark Egmond aan Zee, offshore wind farm in the North Sea
- Öwez Öwezow (born 1997), Turkmen weightlifter
