= Öwezow =

Öwezow is a surname. Notable people with the surname include:

- Balyş Öwezow (1915–1975), Soviet Turkmen politician
- Öwez Öwezow (born 1997), Turkmen weightlifter
