= List of Olympic records in weightlifting =

This is the list of Olympic records in weightlifting. Records are maintained in each weight class for the snatch lift, clean and jerk lift, and the total for both lifts.

The weight classes for men on the Olympic program were adjusted for the 2000 Games, so Olympic records only exist based on the results during and after that. Women's weightlifting made its Olympic debut at the 2000 Games in Sydney, with seven weight classes that have not changed since.

== Current records ==
=== Men ===
♦ denotes a performance that is also a current world record. Statistics are correct as of 31 May 2025.

Event	Record	Athlete	Nation	Games	Date	Ref
61 kg
Snatch	143 kg	Li Fabin	China	2024 Paris	7 August 2024	
Clean & Jerk	172 kg	Li Fabin	China	2020 Tokyo	25 July 2021	
Total	313 kg	Li Fabin	China	2020 Tokyo	25 July 2021	
67 kg
Snatch	151 kg	Olympic Standard			1 November 2018	
Clean & Jerk	187 kg	Chen Lijun	China	2020 Tokyo	25 July 2021	
Total	332 kg	Chen Lijun	China	2020 Tokyo	25 July 2021	
73 kg
Snatch	166 kg	Shi Zhiyong	China	2020 Tokyo	28 July 2021	
Clean & Jerk	199 kg	Rizki Juniansyah	Indonesia	2024 Paris	8 August 2024	
Total	364 kg	Shi Zhiyong	China	2020 Tokyo	28 July 2021	
81 kg
Snatch	170 kg	Lü Xiaojun	China	2020 Tokyo	31 July 2021	
Clean & Jerk	204 kg	Lü Xiaojun	China	2020 Tokyo	31 July 2021	
Total	374 kg	Lü Xiaojun	China	2020 Tokyo	31 July 2021	
89 kg
Snatch	180 kg	Olympic Standard				
Clean & Jerk	♦224 kg	Karlos Nasar	Bulgaria	2024 Paris	9 August 2024	
Total	404 kg	Karlos Nasar	Bulgaria	2024 Paris	9 August 2024	
96 kg
Snatch	183 kg	Olympic Standard			1 November 2018	
Clean & Jerk	225 kg	Fares El-Bakh	Qatar	2020 Tokyo	31 July 2021	
Total	402 kg	Fares El-Bakh	Qatar	2020 Tokyo	31 July 2021	
102 kg
Snatch	186 kg	Olympic Standard				
Clean & Jerk	226 kg	Olympic Standard				
Total	410 kg	Olympic Standard				
109 kg
Snatch	195 kg	Simon Martirosyan	Armenia	2020 Tokyo	3 August 2021	
Clean & Jerk	237 kg	Akbar Djuraev	Uzbekistan	2020 Tokyo	3 August 2021	
Total	430 kg	Akbar Djuraev	Uzbekistan	2020 Tokyo	3 August 2021	
+109 kg
Snatch	223 kg	Lasha Talakhadze	Georgia	2020 Tokyo	4 August 2021	
Clean & Jerk	265 kg	Lasha Talakhadze	Georgia	2020 Tokyo	4 August 2021	
Total	488 kg	Lasha Talakhadze	Georgia	2020 Tokyo	4 August 2021	

=== Women ===
Event	Record	Athlete	Nation	Games	Date	Ref
49 kg
Snatch	94 kg	Hou Zhihui	China	2020 Tokyo	24 July 2021	
Clean & Jerk	117 kg	Hou Zhihui	China	2024 Paris	7 August 2024	
Total	210 kg	Hou Zhihui	China	2020 Tokyo	24 July 2021	
55 kg
Snatch	98 kg	Muattar Nabieva	Uzbekistan	2020 Tokyo	26 July 2021	
Clean & Jerk	127 kg	Hidilyn Diaz	Philippines	2020 Tokyo	26 July 2021	
Total	224 kg	Hidilyn Diaz	Philippines	2020 Tokyo	26 July 2021	
59 kg
Snatch	107 kg	Luo Shifang	China	2024 Paris	8 August 2024	
Clean & Jerk	134 kg	Luo Shifang	China	2024 Paris	8 August 2024	
Total	241 kg	Luo Shifang	China	2024 Paris	8 August 2024	
64 kg
Snatch	108 kg	Olympic Standard			1 November 2018	
Clean & Jerk	134 kg	Olympic Standard			1 November 2018	
Total	242 kg	Olympic Standard			1 November 2018	
71 kg
Snatch	117 kg	Olivia Reeves	United States	2024 Paris	9 August 2024	
Clean & Jerk	148 kg	Olympic Standard				
Total	265 kg	Olympic Standard				
76 kg
Snatch	121 kg	Olympic Standard			1 November 2018	
Clean & Jerk	149 kg	Olympic Standard			1 November 2018	
Total	270 kg	Olympic Standard			1 November 2018	
81 kg
Snatch	122 kg	Olympic Standard				
Clean & Jerk	154 kg	Solfrid Koanda	Norway	2024 Paris	10 August 2024	
Total	275 kg	Solfrid Koanda	Norway	2024 Paris	10 August 2024	
87 kg
Snatch	130 kg	Olympic Standard			1 November 2018	
Clean & Jerk	159 kg	Olympic Standard			1 November 2018	
Total	289 kg	Olympic Standard			1 November 2018	
+87 kg
Snatch	140 kg	Li Wenwen	China	2020 Tokyo	2 August 2021	
Clean & Jerk	180 kg	Li Wenwen	China	2020 Tokyo	2 August 2021	
Total	320 kg	Li Wenwen	China	2020 Tokyo	2 August 2021	

== Historical records ==
=== Men (1998–2018) ===
♦ denotes a performance that is also a current world record. Statistics are correct as of 31 October 2018.

Event	Record	Athlete	Nation	Games	Date	Ref
56 kg
Snatch	138 kg	Halil Mutlu	Turkey	2000 Sydney	16 September 2000	
Clean & Jerk	170 kg	Long Qingquan	China	2016 Rio de Janeiro	7 August 2016	
Total	♦307 kg	Long Qingquan	China	2016 Rio de Janeiro	7 August 2016	
62 kg
Snatch	153 kg	Kim Un-guk	North Korea	2012 London	30 July 2012	
Clean & Jerk	177 kg	Óscar Figueroa	Colombia	2012 London	30 July 2012	
Total	327 kg	Kim Un-guk	North Korea	2012 London	30 July 2012	
69 kg
Snatch	165 kg	Georgi Markov	Bulgaria	2000 Sydney	20 September 2000	
Clean & Jerk	196 kg	Galabin Boevski	Bulgaria	2000 Sydney	20 September 2000	
Total	357 kg	Galabin Boevski	Bulgaria	2000 Sydney	20 September 2000	
77 kg
Snatch	♦177 kg	Lü Xiaojun	China	2016 Rio de Janeiro	10 August 2016	
Clean & Jerk	207 kg	Zhan Xugang	China	2000 Sydney	22 September 2000	
Total	379 kg	Lü Xiaojun	China	2012 London	1 August 2012	
85 kg
Snatch	180 kg	Giorgi Asanidze	Georgia	2000 Sydney	23 September 2000	
Clean & Jerk	217 kg	Tian Tao	China	2016 Rio de Janeiro	12 August 2016	
Total	♦396 kg	Kianoush Rostami	Iran	2016 Rio de Janeiro	12 August 2016	
94 kg
Snatch	187 kg	Kourosh Bagheri	Iran	2000 Sydney	24 September 2000	
Clean & Jerk	224 kg	Szymon Kołecki	Poland	2008 Beijing	17 August 2008	
Total	407 kg	Milen Dobrev	Bulgaria	2004 Athens	23 August 2004	
105 kg
Snatch	♦200 kg	Andrei Aramnau	Belarus	2008 Beijing	18 August 2008	
Clean & Jerk	237 kg	Ruslan Nurudinov	Uzbekistan	2016 Rio de Janeiro	15 August 2016	
Total	436 kg	Andrei Aramnau	Belarus	2008 Beijing	18 August 2008	
+105 kg
Snatch	216 kg	Behdad Salimi	Iran	2016 Rio de Janeiro	16 August 2016	
Clean & Jerk	♦263 kg	Hossein Rezazadeh	Iran	2004 Athens	25 August 2004	
Total	473 kg	Lasha Talakhadze	Georgia	2016 Rio de Janeiro	16 August 2016	

=== Men (1993–1997) ===
♦ denotes a performance that is also a current world record. Statistics are correct as of 1 January 1998.

Event	Record	Athlete	Nation	Games	Date	Ref
54 kg
Snatch	♦132.5 kg	Halil Mutlu	Turkey	1996 Atlanta	20 July 1996	
Clean & Jerk	155.0 kg	Halil Mutlu	Turkey	1996 Atlanta	20 July 1996	
Total	287.5 kg	Halil Mutlu	Turkey	1996 Atlanta	20 July 1996	
59 kg
Snatch	137.5 kg	Leonidas Sabanis	Greece	1996 Atlanta	21 July 1996	
Clean & Jerk	170.0 kg	Tang Lingsheng	China	1996 Atlanta	21 July 1996	
Total	307.5 kg	Tang Lingsheng	China	1996 Atlanta	21 July 1996	
64 kg
Snatch	147.5 kg	Naim Süleymanoğlu	Turkey	1996 Atlanta	22 July 1996	
Clean & Jerk	♦187.5 kg	Valerios Leonidis	Greece	1996 Atlanta	22 July 1996	
Total	♦335.0 kg	Naim Süleymanoğlu	Turkey	1996 Atlanta	22 July 1996	
70 kg
Snatch	162.5 kg	Zhan Xugang	China	1996 Atlanta	23 July 1996	
Clean & Jerk	195.0 kg	Zhan Xugang	China	1996 Atlanta	23 July 1996	
Total	♦357.5 kg	Zhan Xugang	China	1996 Atlanta	23 July 1996	
76 kg
Snatch	162.5 kg	Jon Chol-ho	North Korea	1996 Atlanta	24 July 1996	
Clean & Jerk	205.0 kg	Pablo Lara	Cuba	1996 Atlanta	24 July 1996	
Total	367.5 kg	Pablo Lara	Cuba	1996 Atlanta	24 July 1996	
83 kg
Snatch	♦180.0 kg	Pyrros Dimas	Greece	1996 Summer	26 July 1996	
Clean & Jerk	213.0 kg	Pyrros Dimas	Greece	1996 Summer	26 July 1996	
Total	♦392.5 kg	Pyrros Dimas	Greece	1996 Summer	26 July 1996	
91 kg
Snatch	♦187.5 kg	Aleksey Petrov	Russia	1996 Summer	26 July 1996	
Clean & Jerk	215.0 kg	Leonidas Kokas	Greece	1996 Summer	26 July 1996	
Total	402.5 kg	Aleksey Petrov	Russia	1996 Summer	26 July 1996	
99 kg
Snatch	187.5 kg	Denys Gotfrid	Ukraine	1996 Summer	28 July 1996	
Clean & Jerk	♦235.0 kg	Akakios Kakiasvilis	Greece	1996 Summer	28 July 1996	
Total	♦420.0 kg	Akakios Kakiasvilis	Greece	1996 Summer	28 July 1996	
108 kg
Snatch	197.5 kg	Nicu Vlad	Romania	1996 Summer	29 July 1996	
Clean & Jerk	♦236.0 kg	Timur Taymazov	Ukraine	1996 Summer	29 July 1996	
Total	430.0 kg	Timur Taymazov	Ukraine	1996 Summer	29 July 1996	
+108 kg
Snatch	200.0 kg	Stefan Botev	Australia	1996 Summer	30 July 1996	
Clean & Jerk	260.0 kg	Andrey Chemerkin	Russia	1996 Summer	30 July 1996	
Total	457.5 kg	Andrey Chemerkin	Russia	1996 Summer	30 July 1996	

=== Women (1998–2018) ===
♦ denotes a performance that is also a current world record. Statistics are correct as of 31 October 2018.

Event	Record	Athlete	Nation	Games	Date	Ref
48 kg
Snatch	97 kg	Nurcan Taylan	Turkey	2004 Athens	14 August 2004	
Clean & Jerk	115 kg	Aree Wiratthaworn	Thailand	2004 Athens	14 August 2004	
Total	212 kg	Chen Xiexia	China	2008 Beijing	9 August 2008	
53 kg
Snatch	101 kg	Li Yajun	China	2016 Rio de Janeiro	7 August 2016	
Clean & Jerk	126 kg	Prapawadee Jaroenrattanatarakoon	Thailand	2008 Beijing	10 August 2008	
Total	225 kg	Yang Xia	China	2000 Sydney	18 September 2000	
58 kg
Snatch	110 kg	Sukanya Srisurat	Thailand	2016 Rio de Janeiro	8 August 2016	
Clean & Jerk	138 kg	Chen Yanqing	China	2008 Beijing	11 August 2008	
Total	246 kg	Li Xueying	China	2012 London	30 July 2012	
63 kg
Snatch	115 kg	Hanna Batsiushka	Belarus	2004 Athens	18 August 2004	
Clean & Jerk	♦147 kg	Deng Wei	China	2016 Rio de Janeiro	9 August 2016	
Total	♦262 kg	Deng Wei	China	2016 Rio de Janeiro	9 August 2016	
69 kg
Snatch	122 kg	Liu Chunhong	China	2004 Athens	19 August 2004	
Clean & Jerk	153 kg	Liu Chunhong	China	2004 Athens	19 August 2004	
Total	275 kg	Liu Chunhong	China	2004 Athens	19 August 2004	
75 kg
Snatch	125 kg	Natalya Zabolotnaya	Russia	2004 Athens	20 August 2004	
Clean & Jerk	153 kg	Rim Jong-sim	North Korea	2016 Rio de Janeiro	12 August 2016	
Total	274 kg	Rim Jong-sim	North Korea	2016 Rio de Janeiro	12 August 2016	
+75 kg
Snatch	151 kg	Tatiana Kashirina	Russia	2012 London	5 August 2012	
Clean & Jerk	187 kg	Zhou Lulu	China	2012 London	5 August 2012	
Total	333 kg	Zhou Lulu	China	2012 London	5 August 2012	

== See also ==
- List of Paralympic records in powerlifting
