= 2019 European Weightlifting Championships =

International weightlifting competition

- Location: Batumi, Georgia
- Dates: 6–13 April

The 2019 European Weightlifting Championships was held in Batumi, Georgia from 6th to 13th April 2019.

== Medal table ==
Ranking by Big (Total result) medals

* Host nation (Georgia)

Rank	Nation	Gold	Silver	Bronze	Total
1	Russia (RUS)	3	5	3	11
2	Belarus (BLR)	3	2	3	8
3	Armenia (ARM)	2	1	3	6
4	Romania (ROU)	2	1	1	4
5	Italy (ITA)	2	0	1	3
6	Georgia (GEO)*	1	2	2	5
7	Bulgaria (BUL)	1	2	0	3
8	Turkey (TUR)	1	1	2	4
9	Germany (GER)	1	1	0	2
9	Ukraine (UKR)	1	1	0	2
11	Latvia (LAT)	1	0	1	2
12	France (FRA)	1	0	0	1
12	Poland (POL)	1	0	0	1
14	Great Britain (GBR)	0	1	2	3
15	Albania (ALB)	0	1	0	1
15	Belgium (BEL)	0	1	0	1
15	Spain (ESP)	0	1	0	1
18	Austria (AUT)	0	0	1	1
18	Sweden (SWE)	0	0	1	1
Totals (19 entries)		20	20	20	60

Ranking by all medals: Big (Total result) and Small (Snatch and Clean & Jerk)

* Host nation (Georgia)

Rank	Nation	Gold	Silver	Bronze	Total
1	Russia (RUS)	9	13	4	26
2	Belarus (BLR)	7	6	5	18
3	Armenia (ARM)	6	5	7	18
4	Romania (ROU)	6	3	5	14
5	Georgia (GEO)*	5	6	4	15
6	Italy (ITA)	5	2	3	10
7	Bulgaria (BUL)	4	2	2	8
8	Latvia (LAT)	4	1	2	7
9	Turkey (TUR)	3	6	5	14
10	Ukraine (UKR)	3	3	2	8
11	France (FRA)	2	0	3	5
12	Poland (POL)	2	0	2	4
13	Germany (GER)	1	4	2	7
14	Spain (ESP)	1	3	1	5
15	Albania (ALB)	1	2	2	5
16	Belgium (BEL)	1	1	1	3
17	Great Britain (GBR)	0	3	4	7
18	Sweden (SWE)	0	0	3	3
19	Austria (AUT)	0	0	2	2
20	Israel (ISR)	0	0	1	1
Totals (20 entries)		60	60	60	180

== Medal overview ==
=== Men ===
Event		Gold		Silver		Bronze	
– 55 kg	Snatch	Mirco Scarantino (ITA)	116 kg	Muammer Şahin (TUR)	112 kg	Cristian Marian Luca (ROU)	111 kg
– 55 kg	Clean & Jerk	Angel Rusev (BUL)	146 kg	Mirco Scarantino (ITA)	145 kg	Muammer Şahin (TUR)	135 kg
– 55 kg	Total	Mirco Scarantino (ITA)	261 kg	Angel Rusev (BUL)	256 kg	Muammer Şahin (TUR)	247 kg
– 61 kg	Snatch	Henadz Laptseu (BLR)	133 kg	Bünyamin Sezer (TUR)	132 kg	Ferdi Hardal (TUR)	127 kg
– 61 kg	Clean & Jerk	Shota Mishvelidze (GEO)	156 kg	Ferdi Hardal (TUR)	155 kg	Jon Luke Mau (GER)	154 kg
– 61 kg	Total	Henadz Laptseu (BLR)	286 kg	Bünyamin Sezer (TUR)	283 kg	Ferdi Hardal (TUR)	282 kg
– 67 kg	Snatch	Daniyar İsmayilov (TUR)	147 kg	Simon Brandhuber (GER)	146 kg	Mirko Zanni (ITA)	142 kg
– 67 kg	Clean & Jerk	Bernardin Matam (FRA)	175 kg	Goga Chkheidze (GEO)	169 kg	Simon Brandhuber (GER)	165 kg
– 67 kg	Total	Bernardin Matam (FRA)	312 kg	Simon Brandhuber (GER)	311 kg	Goga Chkheidze (GEO)	308 kg
– 73 kg	Snatch	Briken Calja (ALB)	156 kg	Vadzim Likharad (BLR)	153 kg	Bozhidar Andreev (BUL)	153 kg
– 73 kg	Clean & Jerk	Bozhidar Andreev (BUL)	192 kg	Briken Calja (ALB)	183 kg	David Sánchez (ESP)	183 kg
– 73 kg	Total	Bozhidar Andreev (BUL)	345 kg	Briken Calja (ALB)	339 kg	Vadzim Likharad (BLR)	335 kg
– 81 kg	Snatch	Ritvars Suharevs (LAT)	162 kg	Andrés Mata (ESP)	160 kg	Erkand Qerimaj (ALB)	159 kg
– 81 kg	Clean & Jerk	Antonino Pizzolato (ITA)	201 kg	Celil Erdoğdu (TUR)	196 kg	Petr Asayonak (BLR)	196 kg
– 81 kg	Total	Antonino Pizzolato (ITA)	356 kg	Petr Asayonak (BLR)	355 kg	Ritvars Suharevs (LAT)	354 kg
– 89 kg	Snatch	Revaz Davitadze (GEO)	170 kg	Davit Hovhannisyan (ARM)	165 kg	Hakob Mkrtchyan (ARM)	164 kg
– 89 kg	Clean & Jerk	Hakob Mkrtchyan (ARM)	207 kg	Revaz Davitadze (GEO)	200 kg	Krenar Shoraj (ALB)	195 kg
– 89 kg	Total	Hakob Mkrtchyan (ARM)	371 kg	Revaz Davitadze (GEO)	370 kg	Davit Hovhannisyan (ARM)	360 kg
– 96 kg	Snatch	Yauheni Tsikhantsou (BLR)	178 kg	Anton Pliesnoi (GEO)	173 kg	Kyryl Pyrohov (UKR)	171 kg
– 96 kg	Clean & Jerk	Yauheni Tsikhantsou (BLR)	222 kg	Egor Klimonov (RUS)	210 kg	Vadim Koževņikov (LAT)	207 kg
– 96 kg	Total	Yauheni Tsikhantsou (BLR)	400 kg	Egor Klimonov (RUS)	378 kg	Anton Pliesnoi (GEO)	377 kg
– 102 kg	Snatch	Dmytro Chumak (UKR)	175 kg	Vadzim Straltsou (BLR)	170 kg	Irakli Chkheidze (GEO)	169 kg
– 102 kg	Clean & Jerk	Dmytro Chumak (UKR)	216 kg	Samvel Gasparyan (ARM)	209 kg	Kostiantyn Reva (UKR)	207 kg
– 102 kg	Total	Dmytro Chumak (UKR)	391 kg	Samvel Gasparyan (ARM)	377 kg	Vadzim Straltsou (BLR)	376 kg
– 109 kg	Snatch	Simon Martirosyan (ARM)	192 kg	Rodion Bochkov (RUS)	192 kg	Andrei Aramnau (BLR)	190 kg
– 109 kg	Clean & Jerk	Simon Martirosyan (ARM)	235 kg	Arturs Plesnieks (LAT)	225 kg	Arkadiusz Michalski (POL)	221 kg
– 109 kg	Total	Simon Martirosyan (ARM)	427 kg	Andrei Aramnau (BLR)	411 kg	Rodion Bochkov (RUS)	410 kg
+ 109 kg	Snatch	Lasha Talakhadze (GEO)	218 kg	Irakli Turmanidze (GEO)	206 kg	Gor Minasyan (ARM)	200 kg
+ 109 kg	Clean & Jerk	Lasha Talakhadze (GEO)	260 kg	Ruben Aleksanyan (ARM)	245 kg	Irakli Turmanidze (GEO)	241 kg
+ 109 kg	Total	Lasha Talakhadze (GEO)	478 kg	Irakli Turmanidze (GEO)	447 kg	Ruben Aleksanyan (ARM)	440 kg

=== Women ===
Event		Gold		Silver		Bronze	
– 45 kg	Snatch	Şaziye Erdoğan (TUR)	75 kg	Yuliya Asayonak (BLR)	69 kg	Ivana Petrova (BUL)	69 kg
– 45 kg	Clean & Jerk	Ivana Petrova (BUL)	89 kg	Şaziye Erdoğan (TUR)	88 kg	Cosmina Pană (ROU)	84 kg
– 45 kg	Total	Şaziye Erdoğan (TUR)	163 kg	Ivana Petrova (BUL)	158 kg	Yuliya Asayonak (BLR)	150 kg
– 49 kg	Snatch	Elena Andrieș (ROU)	87 kg	Kristina Sobol (RUS)	85 kg	Anaïs Michel (FRA)	79 kg
– 49 kg	Clean & Jerk	Elena Andrieș (ROU)	103 kg	Giorgia Russo (ITA)	103 kg	Manon Lorentz (FRA)	99 kg
– 49 kg	Total	Elena Andrieș (ROU)	190 kg	Kristina Sobol (RUS)	180 kg	Giorgia Russo (ITA)	178 kg
– 55 kg	Snatch	Lucrezia Magistris (ITA)	90 kg	Svetlana Ershova (RUS)	90 kg	Joanna Łochowska (POL)	87 kg
– 55 kg	Clean & Jerk	Joanna Łochowska (POL)	112 kg	Svetlana Ershova (RUS)	108 kg	Ayşegül Çoban Başol (TUR)	106 kg
– 55 kg	Total	Joanna Łochowska (POL)	199 kg	Svetlana Ershova (RUS)	198 kg	Kristina Novitskaia (RUS)	190 kg
– 59 kg	Snatch	Rebeka Koha (LAT)	101 kg	Izabella Yaylyan (ARM)	96 kg	Aleksandra Kozlova (RUS)	96 kg
– 59 kg	Clean & Jerk	Rebeka Koha (LAT)	120 kg	Tatiana Aleeva (RUS)	120 kg	Florina Sorina Hulpan (ROU)	117 kg
– 59 kg	Total	Rebeka Koha (LAT)	221 kg	Tatiana Aleeva (RUS)	214 kg	Aleksandra Kozlova (RUS)	213 kg
– 64 kg	Snatch	Loredana Toma (ROU)	111 kg	Irina Lepșa (ROU)	102 kg	Giorgia Bordignon (ITA)	101 kg
– 64 kg	Clean & Jerk	Loredana Toma (ROU)	128 kg	Zoe Smith (GBR)	128 kg	Irina Lepșa (ROU)	127 kg
– 64 kg	Total	Loredana Toma (ROU)	239 kg	Irina Lepșa (ROU)	229 kg	Zoe Smith (GBR)	224 kg
– 71 kg	Snatch	Anastasia Romanova (RUS)	112 kg	Mădălina Molie (ROU)	101 kg	Nicole Rubanovich (ISR)	96 kg
– 71 kg	Clean & Jerk	Anastasia Romanova (RUS)	128 kg	Emily Godley (GBR)	123 kg	Maria Åkerlund (SWE)	118 kg
– 71 kg	Total	Anastasia Romanova (RUS)	240 kg	Emily Godley (GBR)	216 kg	Mădălina Molie (ROU)	215 kg
– 76 kg	Snatch	Lydia Valentín (ESP)	108 kg	Darya Naumava (BLR)	106 kg	Gaëlle Nayo-Ketchanke (FRA)	103 kg
– 76 kg	Clean & Jerk	Darya Naumava (BLR)	136 kg	Lydia Valentín (ESP)	133 kg	Patricia Strenius (SWE)	132 kg
– 76 kg	Total	Darya Naumava (BLR)	242 kg	Lydia Valentín (ESP)	241 kg	Patricia Strenius (SWE)	233 kg
– 81 kg	Snatch	Anna Van Bellinghen (BEL)	103 kg	Nina Schroth (GER)	102 kg	Liana Gyurjyan (ARM)	97 kg
– 81 kg	Clean & Jerk	Liana Gyurjyan (ARM)	120 kg	Nina Schroth (GER)	120 kg	Anna Van Bellinghen (BEL)	118 kg
– 81 kg	Total	Nina Schroth (GER)	222 kg	Anna Van Bellinghen (BEL)	221 kg	Liana Gyurjyan (ARM)	217 kg
– 87 kg	Snatch	Kseniia Paskhina (RUS)	110 kg	Diana Mstieva (RUS)	110 kg	Tatev Hakobyan (ARM)	105 kg
– 87 kg	Clean & Jerk	Kseniia Paskhina (RUS)	132 kg	Diana Mstieva (RUS)	130 kg	Sarah Fischer (AUT)	129 kg
– 87 kg	Total	Kseniia Paskhina (RUS)	242 kg	Diana Mstieva (RUS)	240 kg	Sarah Fischer (AUT)	231 kg
+ 87 kg	Snatch	Tatiana Kashirina (RUS)	146 kg	Anastasiya Lysenko (UKR)	120 kg	Emily Campbell (GBR)	115 kg
+ 87 kg	Clean & Jerk	Tatiana Kashirina (RUS)	185 kg	Anastasiya Lysenko (UKR)	148 kg	Emily Campbell (GBR)	145 kg
+ 87 kg	Total	Tatiana Kashirina (RUS)	331 kg	Anastasiya Lysenko (UKR)	268 kg	Emily Campbell (GBR)	260 kg

== Men's results ==
=== Men's 55 kg ===
Rank	Athlete	Group	Body weight	Snatch (kg)				Clean & Jerk (kg)				Total
Rank	Athlete	Group	Body weight	1	2	3	Rank	1	2	3	Rank	Total
1st place, gold medalist(s)	Mirco Scarantino (ITA)	A	54.88	110	112	116	1st place, gold medalist(s)	136	140	145	2nd place, silver medalist(s)	261
2nd place, silver medalist(s)	Angel Rusev (BUL)	A	54.98	105	110	~~112~~	4	~~136~~	138	146	1st place, gold medalist(s)	256
3rd place, bronze medalist(s)	Muammer Şahin (TUR)	A	54.88	~~110~~	~~111~~	112	2nd place, silver medalist(s)	125	132	135	3rd place, bronze medalist(s)	247
4	Cristian Luca (ROU)	A	54.72	103	109	111	3rd place, bronze medalist(s)	130	134	~~137~~	5	245
5	Oleg Musokhranov (RUS)	A	54.78	108	~~111~~	~~111~~	5	130	~~134~~	135	4	243
6	Valentin Iancu (ROU)	A	54.94	102	~~107~~	~~107~~	7	130	~~134~~	~~136~~	6	232
7	Daniel Lungu (MDA)	B	54.84	102	~~106~~	106	6	120	~~125~~	~~125~~	8	226
8	Sergio Massidda (ITA)	A	54.92	~~100~~	100	~~105~~	8	125	~~130~~	~~130~~	7	225
9	Muhammet Akkaya (TUR)	B	54.94	88	~~93~~	93	9	108	115	120	9	213

=== Men's 61 kg ===
Rank	Athlete	Group	Body weight	Snatch (kg)				Clean & Jerk (kg)				Total
Rank	Athlete	Group	Body weight	1	2	3	Rank	1	2	3	Rank	Total
1st place, gold medalist(s)	Henadz Laptseu (BLR)	A	60.60	126	130	133	1st place, gold medalist(s)	150	~~152~~	153	4	286
2nd place, silver medalist(s)	Bünyamin Sezer (TUR)	A	60.94	129	132	~~134~~	2nd place, silver medalist(s)	145	149	151	6	283
3rd place, bronze medalist(s)	Ferdi Hardal (TUR)	A	60.94	~~123~~	124	127	3rd place, bronze medalist(s)	148	151	155	2nd place, silver medalist(s)	282
4	Shota Mishvelidze (GEO)	A	60.98	125	~~129~~	~~129~~	4	~~147~~	149	156	1st place, gold medalist(s)	281
5	Ramini Shamilishvili (GEO)	A	60.60	121	~~124~~	124	6	144	149	152	5	276
6	Josué Brachi (ESP)	A	59.98	122	125	~~128~~	5	145	148	~~151~~	9	273
7	Jon Luke Mau (GER)	A	60.86	115	119	~~121~~	9	~~149~~	149	154	3rd place, bronze medalist(s)	273
8	Davide Ruiu (ITA)	A	60.90	115	120	~~123~~	8	145	149	~~153~~	8	269
9	Rais Gainutdinov (RUS)	B	60.85	115	~~120~~	120	7	~~143~~	143	147	10	267
10	Stoyan Enev (BUL)	A	60.84	~~115~~	115	~~119~~	13	150	~~154~~	~~155~~	7	265
11	Ilie Ciotoiu (ROU)	A	60.78	117	~~121~~	~~121~~	11	146	~~151~~	~~152~~	11	263
12	Dmytro Sukhotskyi (UKR)	B	60.70	110	114	117	10	135	~~140~~	140	13	257
13	Pavlo Zalipskyi (UKR)	B	59.40	~~112~~	112	116	12	135	~~140~~	140	12	256
14	František Polák (CZE)	B	60.25	102	106	~~110~~	14	130	135	~~140~~	14	241

=== Men's 67 kg ===
Rank	Athlete	Group	Body weight	Snatch (kg)				Clean & Jerk (kg)				Total
Rank	Athlete	Group	Body weight	1	2	3	Rank	1	2	3	Rank	Total
1st place, gold medalist(s)	Bernardin Matam (FRA)	A	66.84	137	~~141~~	~~141~~	5	169	172	175	1st place, gold medalist(s)	312
2nd place, silver medalist(s)	Simon Brandhuber (GER)	A	66.78	140	143	146	2nd place, silver medalist(s)	160	165	~~168~~	3rd place, bronze medalist(s)	311
3rd place, bronze medalist(s)	Goga Chkheidze (GEO)	A	66.72	132	136	139	4	165	169	~~173~~	2nd place, silver medalist(s)	308
4	Mirko Zanni (ITA)	A	66.74	~~140~~	140	142	3rd place, bronze medalist(s)	163	~~167~~	~~167~~	4	305
5	Daniel Vizitiu (ROU)	A	66.82	135	~~140~~	~~140~~	6	155	~~159~~	160	7	295
6	Feliks Khalibekov (RUS)	A	66.94	~~132~~	132	135	7	153	158	~~161~~	8	293
7	Petar Angelov (BUL)	A	66.74	125	130	133	8	156	~~163~~	~~163~~	9	289
8	Gareth Evans (GBR)	B	66.68	125	~~130~~	~~130~~	9	150	155	160	6	285
	Daniyar İsmayilov (TUR)	A	66.50	145	147	~~154~~	1st place, gold medalist(s)	~~165~~	~~165~~	~~166~~	—	—
	Mohammed Siraj (GBR)	A	66.64	110	115	~~120~~	10	~~138~~	~~138~~	~~138~~	—	—
	Acorán Hernández (ESP)	B	66.54	~~133~~	~~133~~	~~133~~	—	155	159	161	5	—

=== Men's 73 kg ===
Rank	Athlete	Group	Body weight	Snatch (kg)				Clean & Jerk (kg)				Total
Rank	Athlete	Group	Body weight	1	2	3	Rank	1	2	3	Rank	Total
1st place, gold medalist(s)	Bozhidar Andreev (BUL)	A	72.84	148	153	~~157~~	2nd place, silver medalist(s)	181	187	192	1st place, gold medalist(s)	345
2nd place, silver medalist(s)	Briken Calja (ALB)	A	72.84	152	156	~~160~~	1st place, gold medalist(s)	~~183~~	183	~~188~~	2nd place, silver medalist(s)	339
3rd place, bronze medalist(s)	Vadzim Likharad (BLR)	A	72.86	153	~~156~~	~~157~~	3rd place, bronze medalist(s)	~~176~~	176	182	4	335
4	David Sánchez (ESP)	A	72.88	143	~~147~~	147	7	177	~~183~~	183	3rd place, bronze medalist(s)	330
5	Muhammed Furkan Özbek (TUR)	A	72.88	140	145	~~148~~	8	174	180	~~184~~	5	325
6	Sergei Petrov (RUS)	A	72.80	145	150	~~154~~	4	173	~~180~~	~~181~~	7	323
7	Marin Robu (MDA)	A	72.82	140	145	148	5	168	173	~~176~~	8	321
8	Ramazan İlhan (TUR)	A	71.28	143	148	~~151~~	6	163	~~168~~	~~170~~	13	311
9	Armen Grigoryan (ARM)	A	72.88	140	~~145~~	~~145~~	10	170	~~175~~	~~175~~	10	310
10	Paul Dumitraşcu (ROU)	B	72.38	132	~~136~~	~~137~~	14	172	177	~~182~~	6	309
11	Archil Malakmadze (GEO)	B	72.16	133	138	141	9	160	167	~~171~~	12	308
12	Tim Kring (DEN)	B	72.94	~~134~~	134	138	12	165	169	~~172~~	11	307
13	Petr Petrov (CZE)	B	72.46	133	~~137~~	~~137~~	13	163	171	~~175~~	9	304
14	Kanan Khalilov (AZE)	B	72.76	120	124	~~128~~	15	140	~~144~~	145	14	269
	Ivan Klim (BLR)	A	72.70	140	—	—	11	—	—	—	—	—

=== Men's 81 kg ===
Rank	Athlete	Group	Body weight	Snatch (kg)				Clean & Jerk (kg)				Total
Rank	Athlete	Group	Body weight	1	2	3	Rank	1	2	3	Rank	Total
1st place, gold medalist(s)	Antonino Pizzolato (ITA)	A	80.92	~~155~~	155	~~160~~	6	190	195	201	1st place, gold medalist(s)	356
2nd place, silver medalist(s)	Petr Asayonak (BLR)	A	80.56	~~159~~	159	~~162~~	4	191	195	196	3rd place, bronze medalist(s)	355
3rd place, bronze medalist(s)	Ritvars Suharevs (LAT)	A	80.76	155	160	162	1st place, gold medalist(s)	183	187	192	5	354
4	Celil Erdoğdu (TUR)	A	80.50	~~153~~	153	156	5	182	191	196	2nd place, silver medalist(s)	352
5	Andrés Mata (ESP)	B	80.62	152	157	160	2nd place, silver medalist(s)	~~187~~	~~187~~	187	9	347
6	Erkand Qerimaj (ALB)	B	80.74	155	157	159	3rd place, bronze medalist(s)	188	~~193~~	~~194~~	7	347
7	Nico Müller (GER)	A	80.52	150	155	~~159~~	7	190	~~195~~	~~196~~	6	345
8	Rafik Harytyunyan (ARM)	A	80.98	145	150	~~153~~	11	185	189	194	4	344
9	Max Lang (GER)	B	80.28	150	~~154~~	154	9	180	~~186~~	187	8	341
10	Ihar Lozka (BLR)	A	80.20	146	151	155	8	185	~~193~~	~~195~~	10	340
11	Krzysztof Zwarycz (POL)	A	80.62	~~152~~	152	~~156~~	10	183	~~186~~	~~187~~	11	335
12	Apti Aukhadov (RUS)	B	80.90	145	~~150~~	~~150~~	14	180	—	—	12	325
13	Jack Oliver (GBR)	B	80.38	142	146	~~150~~	12	172	~~176~~	176	14	322
14	Alejandro González (ESP)	B	80.70	140	145	~~148~~	15	175	~~180~~	~~180~~	15	320
15	Petr Mareček (CZE)	B	80.12	141	~~146~~	146	13	163	168	173	18	319
16	Omed Alam (DEN)	B	79.70	139	142	145	16	170	174	~~177~~	17	319
17	Richard Tkáč (SVK)	B	80.76	137	141	~~144~~	18	169	175	~~179~~	16	316
18	Máté Kmegy (HUN)	B	80.50	~~140~~	140	~~143~~	19	168	~~172~~	176	13	316
19	Sean Brown (IRL)	C	80.60	144	~~147~~	~~147~~	17	167	171	~~175~~	19	315
20	Lomia Tebidze (GEO)	C	79.68	130	134	137	21	163	170	~~179~~	21	307
21	Kanan Aliguliyev (AZE)	C	80.36	125	131	135	22	~~162~~	165	171	20	306
22	Chris Murray (GBR)	C	78.16	131	135	139	20	161	~~165~~	165	23	304
23	Ervin Rozsnyik (SRB)	C	80.06	135	~~140~~	~~140~~	23	165	~~170~~	~~170~~	22	300
24	Einar Jónsson (ISL)	C	74.16	110	115	~~120~~	24	140	~~145~~	147	24	262
25	Arbnor Krasniqi (KOS)	C	80.94	~~95~~	~~95~~	95	25	~~115~~	115	120	25	215
	Daniel Godelli (ALB)	A	80.56	~~160~~	~~161~~	~~161~~	—	—	—	—	—	—

=== Men's 89 kg ===
Rank	Athlete	Group	Body weight	Snatch (kg)				Clean & Jerk (kg)				Total
Rank	Athlete	Group	Body weight	1	2	3	Rank	1	2	3	Rank	Total
1st place, gold medalist(s)	Hakob Mkrtchyan (ARM)	A	88.82	160	164	~~166~~	3rd place, bronze medalist(s)	201	207	—	1st place, gold medalist(s)	371
2nd place, silver medalist(s)	Revaz Davitadze (GEO)	A	88.22	164	167	170	1st place, gold medalist(s)	194	~~199~~	200	2nd place, silver medalist(s)	370
3rd place, bronze medalist(s)	Davit Hovhannisyan (ARM)	A	88.50	155	160	165	2nd place, silver medalist(s)	185	192	195	4	360
4	Bartłomiej Adamus (POL)	A	89.00	152	157	~~160~~	4	187	~~192~~	193	7	350
5	Krenar Shoraj (ALB)	A	88.06	155	~~160~~	~~161~~	7	195	~~200~~	~~201~~	3rd place, bronze medalist(s)	350
6	Tudor Ciobanu (MDA)	B	88.38	149	~~155~~	156	5	187	~~192~~	192	9	348
7	Marin Gologan (ROU)	A	88.02	~~152~~	152	~~157~~	8	186	193	~~196~~	6	345
8	Armands Mežinskis (LAT)	B	87.74	142	147	151	9	181	187	193	5	344
9	Antonis Martasidis (CYP)	A	88.36	~~150~~	150	~~155~~	10	190	~~195~~	~~195~~	10	340
10	Brandon Vautard (FRA)	B	88.08	~~140~~	140	~~145~~	13	192	~~197~~	~~197~~	8	332
11	Enzo Menoni (FRA)	B	88.14	148	152	155	6	173	~~178~~	~~178~~	13	328
12	Burak Sungu (BEL)	B	87.34	143	148	~~152~~	11	165	170	~~175~~	14	318
13	Amar Musić (CRO)	B	87.40	138	142	~~145~~	12	170	175	~~180~~	12	317
14	Peter Polaček (SVK)	B	87.96	~~135~~	135	~~140~~	16	170	175	180	11	315
15	Josef Kolář (CZE)	B	88.40	133	136	139	15	165	170	~~175~~	15	309
16	David Šircelj (SLO)	B	81.48	115	~~119~~	~~121~~	17	143	148	~~152~~	16	263
	Jesse Nykänen (FIN)	B	88.92	139	~~143~~	~~143~~	14	~~170~~	~~170~~	~~171~~	—	—
	Kacper Kłos (POL)	B	86.64	—	—	—	—	—	—	—	—	—
DQ	Maksim Mudreuski (BLR)	A	88.80	156	161	166	—	183	~~190~~	190	—	—
DQ	Irmantas Kačinskas (LTU)	B	88.20	143	148	~~152~~	—	170	175	~~180~~	—	—
