= Alireza Soleimani (weightlifter) =

Iranian weightlifter

Personal information
- Native name: علیرضا سلیمانی
- Nationality: Iranian
- Born: 17 February 1996 (age 30)
- Weight: 104.65 kg (230.7 lb)

Sport
- Country: Iran
- Sport: Weightlifting
- Event: 105 kg

Achievements and titles
- Personal bests: Snatch: 181 kg (2017); Clean and jerk: 215 kg (2017); Total: 392 kg (2017)
Medal record
Men's weightlifting
Representing Iran
World Youth Championships
Silver medal – second place	2013 Tashkent	+94 kg

Alireza Soleimani (Persian: علیرضا سلیمانی, also Romanized as "Alīrezā Soleimānī"; born 17 February 1996) is an Iranian weightlifter who won the silver medal in the Men's +94 kg weight class at the 2013 World Youth Weightlifting Championships.

== Major results ==
Year	Venue	Weight	Snatch (kg)				Clean & Jerk (kg)				Total	Rank
Year	Venue	Weight	1	2	3	Rank	1	2	3	Rank	Total	Rank
World Championships
2021	Tashkent, Uzbekistan	109 kg	~~172~~	172	179	4	195	~~206~~	~~206~~	11	374	7
2017	Anaheim, United States	105 kg	177	~~183~~	~~184~~	9	215	~~222~~	~~223~~	6	392	7
Asian Indoor Games
2017	Ashgabat, Turkmenistan	105 kg	175	181	~~186~~	2	210	~~218~~	~~218~~	4	391	4
