= Svetlana Ershova =

Russian weightlifter (born 1994)

Personal information
- Nationality: Russia
- Born: 14 March 1994 (age 32)
- Weight: 54.44 kg (120.0 lb)

Sport
- Country: Russia
- Sport: Weightlifting
- Event: –55 kg
Medal record
European Championships
Silver medal – second place	2019 Batumi	–55 kg
Silver medal – second place	2021 Moscow	–55 kg

Svetlana Vadimovna Ershova (Russian: Светлана Вадимовна Ершова, born 14 March 1994) is a Russian weightlifter, competing in the 53 kg and 58 kg categories until 2018 and 55 kg starting in 2018 after the International Weightlifting Federation reorganized the categories.

== Career ==
She competed at the 2019 European Weightlifting Championships in the 55 kg category winning silver medals in the snatch, clean & jerk and total. She won silver the second time at the 2021 European Weightlifting Championships.

== Major results ==
Year	Venue	Weight	Snatch (kg)				Clean & Jerk (kg)				Total	Rank
Year	Venue	Weight	1	2	3	Rank	1	2	3	Rank	Total	Rank
European Championships
2019	(Georgia (country)) Batumi, Georgia	55 kg	85	88	90	2nd place, silver medalist(s)	105	108	~~110~~	2nd place, silver medalist(s)	198	2nd place, silver medalist(s)
2021	Moscow, Russia	55 kg	~~85~~	85	88	5	105	110	112	2nd place, silver medalist(s)	200	2nd place, silver medalist(s)
