= Akbar Djuraev =

Uzbekistani weightlifter (born 1999)

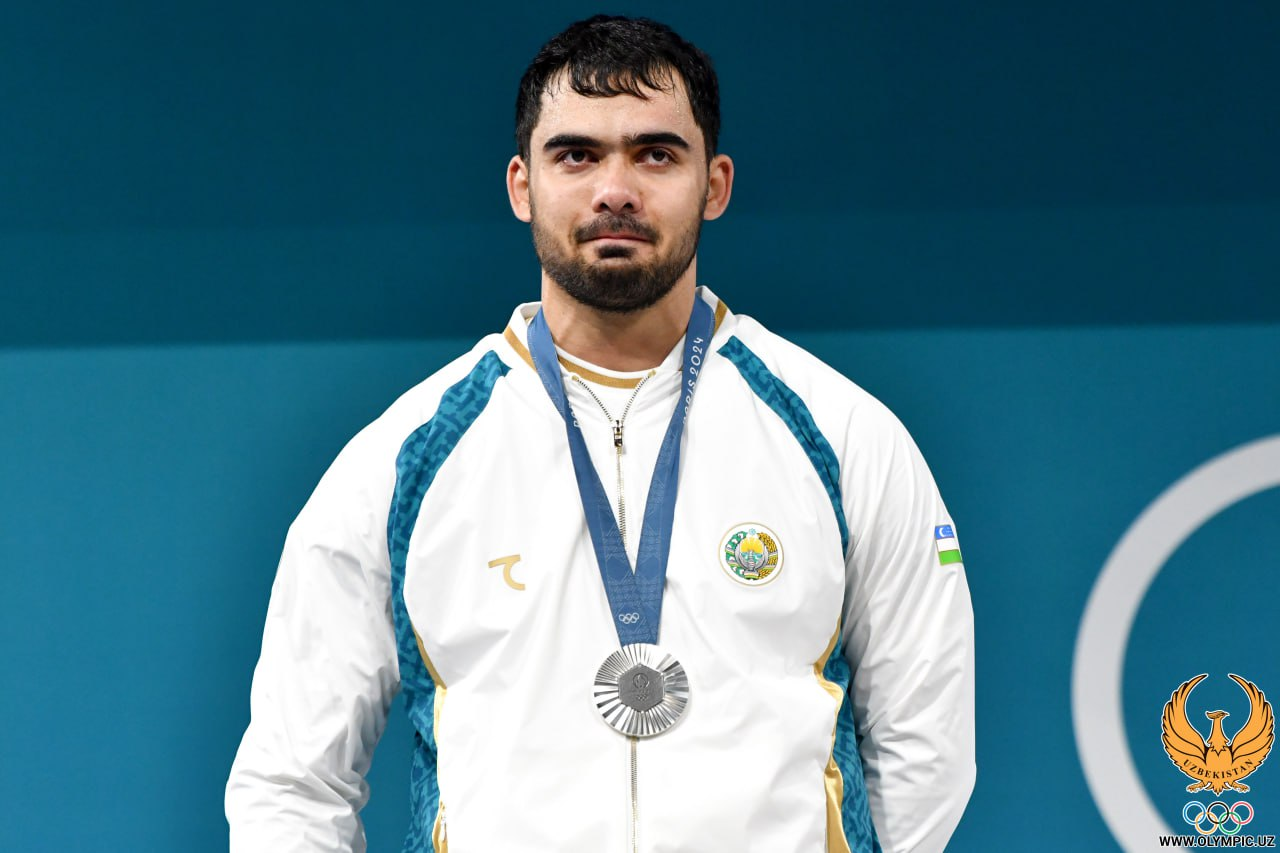
- Djuraev at the 2024 Summer Olympics

Personal information
- Nationality: Uzbekistani
- Born: 8 October 1999 (age 27) Tashkent
- Weight: 108.55 kg (239.3 lb)

Sport
- Country: Uzbekistan
- Sport: Weightlifting
- Weight class: 109 kg
- Team: National team
- Coached by: Mansurbek Chashemov; Bakhrom Abdumalikov

Achievements and titles
- Personal bests: Snatch: 196 kg (2025); Clean and jerk: 242 kg (2023); Total: 437 kg (2023)
Medal record
Men's weightlifting
Representing Uzbekistan
Olympic Games
Gold medal – first place	2020 Tokyo	109 kg
Silver medal – second place	2024 Paris	102 kg
World Championships
Gold medal – first place	2021 Tashkent	109 kg
Gold medal – first place	2023 Riyadh	109 kg
Gold medal – first place	2025 Førde	110 kg
Gold medal – first place	2026 Ningbo	110 kg
Asian Games
Gold medal – first place	2026 Aichi–Nagoya	110 kg
Silver medal – second place	2022 Hangzhou	109 kg
Asian Championships
Gold medal – first place	2024 Tashkent	102 kg
Gold medal – first place	2025 Jiangshan	109 kg
Silver medal – second place	2019 Ningbo	109 kg
Silver medal – second place	2020 Tashkent	109 kg
Bronze medal – third place	2023 Jinju	+109 kg
Islamic Solidarity Games
Gold medal – first place	2021 Konya	+109 S
Gold medal – first place	2021 Konya	+109 kg C
Gold medal – first place	2021 Konya	+109 kg T
Gold medal – first place	2025 Riyadh	110 kg S
Gold medal – first place	2025 Riyadh	110 kg C
Gold medal – first place	2025 Riyadh	110 kg T
World Junior Championships
Gold medal – first place	2019 Suva	109 kg

Akbar Djuraev (born 8 October 1999) is an Uzbekistani weightlifter, Olympic Champion and Junior World Champion. He won the gold medal in the men's 109 kg event at the 2020 Summer Olympics held in Tokyo, Japan. He also won the gold medal in the men's 109 kg event at the 2021 World Weightlifting Championships held in Tashkent, Uzbekistan.

He competed in the 105 kg category until 2018, and the 102 kg and 109 kg categories starting in 2018 after the International Weightlifting Federation reorganized the categories.

He holds the junior world record in the snatch and total in the 102 kg division, as well as the snatch, clean & jerk and total in the 109 kg division.

== Career ==
In the 2017 Junior World Championships, Djuraev finished sixth in the 105-kilogram weight category with a total of 352 kilograms in the two exercises (162 + 190).

At the 2017 World Championships in Anaheim, Akbar placed 13th with a total of 373 kilograms in the 105-kilogram weight category. In the snatch, Akbar lifted 174 kilograms, and in the clean and jerk, he managed 199 kilograms.

In the 2018 Junior Asian Championships, Akbar won a gold medal with a total of 372 kilograms. In the same year. In the 2018 Junior World Championships in Tashkent, he secured a silver medal. In total, Akbar Djuraev lifted 369 kilograms, with 167 kilograms in the snatch and 202 kilograms in the clean and jerk.

In early November 2018, at the World Championships in Ashgabat, the Uzbek athlete won a gold medal in the 102-kilogram weight category in the snatch, lifting 180 kilograms. In the overall standings, he finished fourth, missing the absolute bronze medal by just one kilogram. His result in the clean and jerk was 212 kilograms.

In the December 2018 Qatar International Cup, Akbar Djuraev won a bronze medal in the new 109-kilogram weight category, lifting a total of 392 kilograms, the same weight he lifted at the World Championships in Ashgabat. In April, at the Asian Championships, Akbar Djuraev improved his personal record in the 109-kilogram weight category. The Uzbek weightlifter lifted 185 kilograms in the snatch and 225 kilograms in the clean and jerk, with a total of 410 kilograms, earning him a silver medal. In June, he became the Junior World Champion, lifting a total of 398 kilograms.

At the 2019 World Championships in Pattaya, Akbar Djuraev won a silver medal in the 109-kilogram weight category, jerking 229 kilograms. In the final standings, he finished fourth with a total of 417 kilograms. This result is a junior world record. He also won the Qatar Cup, with successful attempts of 185 kilograms in the snatch and 220 kilograms in the clean and jerk (405 kilograms in total).

In 2020, he won gold at the International Solidarity Championships, lifting a total of 410 kilograms in the two exercises. In the April Asian Championships, he again placed second, achieving a career-best result in the 109-kilogram weight category – 194 kilograms in the snatch and 234 kilograms in the clean and jerk (a total of 428 kilograms). He earned the right to participate in the 2020 Summer Olympics in Tokyo after defeating Olympic champion Ruslan Nurudinov by 12 kilograms at the Uzbekistan Championship. In Japan, he defeated Armenian weightlifter Simon Martirosyan and became an Olympic champion.

In Saudi Arabia, at the 2023 World Weightlifting Championships, the Uzbek athlete in the 109-kilogram category won the gold medal of the world championship with a total of 415 kilograms in the two exercises. He also received the small gold medal in the snatch and the small silver medal in the clean and jerk.

In August 2024, Djuraev competed in the men's 102 kg event at the 2024 Summer Olympics held in Paris, France. He placed second with a total of 404 kg missing out 2 kg on the gold medal won by China's Liu Huanhua.

== Major results ==
Year	Venue	Weight	Snatch (kg)				Clean & Jerk (kg)				Total	Rank
Year	Venue	Weight	1	2	3	Rank	1	2	3	Rank	Total	Rank
Olympic Games
2021	Tokyo, Japan	109 kg	~~189~~	189	193	—N/a	227	~~234~~	237 OR	—N/a	430 OR	1st place, gold medalist(s)
2024	Paris, France	102 kg	180	185	~~189~~	—N/a	219	~~224~~	~~232~~	—N/a	404	2nd place, silver medalist(s)
World Championships
2017	Anaheim, United States	105 kg	164	169	174	12	194	199	~~203~~	15	373	13
2018	Ashgabat, Turkmenistan	102 kg	173	178	180	1st place, gold medalist(s)	200	207	212	4	392	4
2019	Pattaya, Thailand	109 kg	~~183~~	184	188	6	221	226	229	2nd place, silver medalist(s)	417	4
2021	Tashkent, Uzbekistan	109 kg	187	192	195	1st place, gold medalist(s)	226	232	238	1st place, gold medalist(s)	433	1st place, gold medalist(s)
2023	Riyadh, Saudi Arabia	109 kg	182	~~189~~	189	1st place, gold medalist(s)	220	226	~~231~~	2nd place, silver medalist(s)	415	1st place, gold medalist(s)
2025	Førde, Norway	110 kg	189	193	196 CWR	1st place, gold medalist(s)	227	232	~~245~~	1st place, gold medalist(s)	428 CWR	1st place, gold medalist(s)
2026	Ningbo, China	110 kg	190	195	198 WR	1st place, gold medalist(s)	228	234	~~238~~	1st place, gold medalist(s)	432 WR	1st place, gold medalist(s)
IWF World Cup
2024	Phuket, Thailand	109 kg	180	185	189	1st place, gold medalist(s)	220	227	—	1st place, gold medalist(s)	416	1st place, gold medalist(s)
Asian Games
2023	Hangzhou, China	109 kg	180	184	189	—N/a	~~220~~	222	228	—N/a	417	2nd place, silver medalist(s)
2026	Nagoya, Japan	110 kg	190	195	197	—N/a	226	—	—	—N/a	423	1st place, gold medalist(s)
Asian Championships
2019	Ningbo, China	109 kg	176	181	185	2nd place, silver medalist(s)	215	219	225	2nd place, silver medalist(s)	410	2nd place, silver medalist(s)
2020	Tashkent, Uzbekistan	109 kg	188	194	~~197~~	2nd place, silver medalist(s)	225	234	~~238~~	2nd place, silver medalist(s)	428	2nd place, silver medalist(s)
2023	Jinju, South Korea	+109 kg	189	~~195~~	195	4	230	~~240~~	242	3rd place, bronze medalist(s)	437	3rd place, bronze medalist(s)
2024	Tashkent, Uzbekistan	102 kg	175	180	~~183~~	1st place, gold medalist(s)	214	~~219~~	220	1st place, gold medalist(s)	400	1st place, gold medalist(s)
2025	Jiangshan, China	109 kg	180	183	~~189~~	1st place, gold medalist(s)	217	223	—	1st place, gold medalist(s)	406	1st place, gold medalist(s)
World Junior Championships
2017	Tokyo, Japan	105 kg	155	159	162	4	~~185~~	185	190	6	352	6
2018	Tashkent, Uzbekistan	105 kg	167	~~172~~	~~172~~	2nd place, silver medalist(s)	195	202	~~210~~	2nd place, silver medalist(s)	369	2nd place, silver medalist(s)
2019	Suva, Fiji	109 kg	173	177	182	1st place, gold medalist(s)	212	216	—	1st place, gold medalist(s)	398	1st place, gold medalist(s)
