= Rodion Bochkov =

Russian weightlifter (born 1993)

Personal information
- Nationality: Russia
- Born: 27 September 1993 (age 32)
- Weight: 108.0 kg (238.1 lb)

Sport
- Country: Russia
- Sport: Weightlifting
- Event: –109 kg
Medal record
European Championships
| Disqualified | 2019 Batumi | 109 kg |
Summer Universiade
| Disqualified | 2017 Taipei | 105 kg |

Rodion Bochkov (Russian: Родион Бочков, born 27 September 1993) is a Russian weightlifter competing in the 105 kg category until 2018 and 109 kg starting in 2018 after the International Weightlifting Federation reorganized the categories.

== Career ==
In 2019 he competed at the 2019 European Weightlifting Championships in the 109 kg division, winning a silver medal in the snatch and a bronze medal in the total.

== Major results ==
| Year | Venue | Weight | Snatch (kg) | | | | Clean & Jerk (kg) | | | | Total | Rank |
| Year | Venue | Weight | 1 | 2 | 3 | Rank | 1 | 2 | 3 | Rank | Total | Rank |
World Championships
| 2018 | Ashgabat, Turkmenistan | 109 kg | 179 | 184 | 190 | 3rd place, bronze medalist(s) | 210 | ~~216~~ | ~~218~~ | 15 | 400 | 5 |
| 2019 | Pattaya, Thailand | 109 kg | 184 | 189 | ~~192~~ | 4 | 215 | 221 | 225 | 4 | 414 | 5 |
European Championships
| 2019 | (Georgia (country)) Batumi, Georgia | 109 kg | 182 | 187 | 192 | 2nd place, silver medalist(s) | 213 | ~~218~~ | 218 | 5 | 410 | 3rd place, bronze medalist(s) |
