= Vasil Gospodinov =

Bulgarian weightlifter (born 1993)

Personal information
- Nationality: Bulgaria
- Born: 5 November 1993 (age 32)
- Education: Paisii Hilendarski Plovdiv University
- Height: 1.83
- Weight: 106.81 kg (235.5 lb)

Sport
- Country: Bulgaria
- Sport: Weightlifting
- Weight class: 109 kg
- Coached by: Lachezar Kishkilov
Medal record
European Championships
Silver medal – second place	2017 Split	–105 kg
Bronze medal – third place	2014 Tel Aviv	–94 kg

Vasil Georgiev Gospodinov (Bulgarian: Васил Георгиев Господинов; born 5 November 1993) is a Bulgarian male weightlifter, most recently competing in the 109 kg division at the 2018 World Weightlifting Championships.

== Career ==
He was the silver medallist at the 2017 European Weightlifting Championships.

== Major results ==
Year	Venue	Weight	Snatch (kg)				Clean & Jerk (kg)				Total	Rank
Year	Venue	Weight	1	2	3	Rank	1	2	3	Rank	Total	Rank
World Championships
2014	Almaty, Kazakhstan	94 kg	166	173	~~177~~	6	~~196~~	196	204	10	377	9
2015	Houston, United States	105 kg	165	~~172~~	~~172~~	20	196	203	~~208~~	20	368	18
2017	Anaheim, United States	105 kg	~~175~~	~~176~~	178	8	~~214~~	214	~~220~~	7	392	6
2018	Ashgabat, Turkmenistan	109 kg	176	~~182~~	~~182~~	11	~~217~~	217	~~221~~	9	393	8
European Championships
2013	Tirana, Albania	105 kg	~~160~~	160	~~165~~	11	~~195~~	195	~~201~~	10	355	10
2014	Tel Aviv, Israel	94 kg	165	171	174	2nd place, silver medalist(s)	195	201	205	3rd place, bronze medalist(s)	379	3rd place, bronze medalist(s)
2016	Førde, Norway	105 kg	~~174~~	175	~~180~~	8	210	215	~~223~~	5	390	6
2017	Split, Croatia	105 kg	175	180	~~183~~	3rd place, bronze medalist(s)	212	217	~~225~~	3rd place, bronze medalist(s)	397	2nd place, silver medalist(s)
