= Arnas Šidiškis =

Lithuanian weightlifter (born 1990)

Personal information
- Born: July 5, 1990; Lithuania

Sport
- Sport: Weightlifting

Arnas Šidiškis (born 7 July 1990) is a Lithuanian olympic weightlifter.

Šidiškis represented Lithuania at the 2019 World Championships where he finished in 22nd place. At the 2021 European Weightlifting Championships he finished 10th in 109kg category with total result of 354kg.

In June 2021 it was announced that Šidiškis qualified for 2020 Summer Olympics in Tokyo, Japan. He competed in the men's 109 kg event.
