= 2018 World Weightlifting Championships =

International weightlifting competition

2018 World Championships
- Host city: (Turkmenistan) Ashgabat
- Dates: 1–10 November
- Main venue: Ashgabat Weightlifting Arena

The 2018 World Weightlifting Championships were held in Ashgabat, Turkmenistan from 1 to 10 November 2018. This was the first World Championship after the IWF changed their weight classes and nullified all world records. As a result, this World Championship saw a total of 31 senior men's world records and 41 senior women's world records set.

To celebrate the event, then-President of Turkmenistan Gurbanguly Berdimuhamedow lifted a golden weight bar, albeit without any actual weights, during a cabinet meeting while his subordinates applauded him. The bizarre scene, broadcast on state media, was met with ridicule by worldwide press.

== Medal summary ==
=== Men ===
Event	Gold		Silver		Bronze	
55 kg
Snatch	Om Yun-chol; North Korea	120 kg	Arli Chontey; Kazakhstan	120 kg	Josué Brachi; Spain	115 kg
Clean & Jerk	Om Yun-chol; North Korea	162 kg WR	Lại Gia Thành; Vietnam	142 kg	Angel Rusev; Bulgaria	140 kg
Total	Om Yun-chol; North Korea	282 kg	Arli Chontey; Kazakhstan	258 kg	Mirco Scarantino; Italy	252 kg
61 kg
Snatch	Eko Yuli Irawan; Indonesia	143 kg	Li Fabin; China	142 kg	Qin Fulin; China	139 kg
Clean & Jerk	Eko Yuli Irawan; Indonesia	174 kg WR	Qin Fulin; China	169 kg	Francisco Mosquera; Colombia	169 kg
Total	Eko Yuli Irawan; Indonesia	317 kg WR	Li Fabin; China	310 kg	Qin Fulin; China	308 kg
67 kg
Snatch	Huang Minhao; China	152 kg	Chen Lijun; China	150 kg	Julio Mayora; Venezuela	147 kg
Clean & Jerk	Chen Lijun; China	182 kg	Doston Yokubov; Uzbekistan	180 kg	Óscar Figueroa; Colombia	178 kg
Total	Chen Lijun; China	332 kg WR	Huang Minhao; China	323 kg	Julio Mayora; Venezuela	322 kg
73 kg
Snatch	Shi Zhiyong; China	164 kg WR	Vadzim Likharad; Belarus	156 kg	Feng Lüdong; China	155 kg
Clean & Jerk	Shi Zhiyong; China	196 kg WR	Won Jeong-sik; South Korea	195 kg	Ri Chong-song; North Korea	187 kg
Total	Shi Zhiyong; China	360 kg WR	Won Jeong-sik; South Korea	348 kg	Vadzim Likharad; Belarus	343 kg
81 kg
Snatch	Mohamed Ehab; Egypt	173 kg WR	Lü Xiaojun; China	172 kg	Li Dayin; China	168 kg
Clean & Jerk	Li Dayin; China	204 kg	Lü Xiaojun; China	202 kg	Mohamed Ehab; Egypt	200 kg
Total	Lü Xiaojun; China	374 kg WR	Mohamed Ehab; Egypt	373 kg	Li Dayin; China	372 kg
89 kg
Snatch	Arley Méndez; Chile	169 kg	Pavel Khadasevich; Belarus	169 kg	Jhor Moreno; Colombia	168 kg
Clean & Jerk	Artem Okulov; Russia	206 kg	Hakob Mkrtchyan; Armenia	205 kg	Keydomar Vallenilla; Venezuela	204 kg
Total	Artem Okulov; Russia	372 kg	Pavel Khadasevich; Belarus	371 kg	Revaz Davitadze; Georgia	371 kg
96 kg
Snatch	Sohrab Moradi; Iran	186 kg WR	Tian Tao; China	181 kg	Yauheni Tsikhantsou; Belarus	180 kg
Clean & Jerk	Sohrab Moradi; Iran	230 kg WR	Tian Tao; China	226 kg	Fares El-Bakh; Qatar	217 kg
Total	Sohrab Moradi; Iran	416 kg WR	Tian Tao; China	407 kg	Nicolae Onică; Romania	391 kg
102 kg
Snatch	Akbar Djuraev; Uzbekistan	180 kg	Ali Hashemi; Iran	179 kg	Dmytro Chumak; Ukraine	176 kg
Clean & Jerk	Reza Beiranvand; Iran	218 kg	Dmytro Chumak; Ukraine	217 kg	Ali Hashemi; Iran	217 kg
Total	Ali Hashemi; Iran	396 kg	Dmytro Chumak; Ukraine	393 kg	Reza Beiranvand; Iran	393 kg
109 kg
Snatch	Yang Zhe; China	196 kg	Simon Martirosyan; Armenia	195 kg	Rodion Bochkov; Russia	190 kg
Clean & Jerk	Simon Martirosyan; Armenia	240 kg WR	Arkadiusz Michalski; Poland	228 kg	Ruslan Nurudinov; Uzbekistan	227 kg
Total	Simon Martirosyan; Armenia	435 kg WR	Yang Zhe; China	419 kg	Arkadiusz Michalski; Poland	403 kg
+109 kg
Snatch	Lasha Talakhadze; Georgia	217 kg WR	Gor Minasyan; Armenia	205 kg	Irakli Turmanidze; Georgia	203 kg
Clean & Jerk	Lasha Talakhadze; Georgia	257 kg WR	Gor Minasyan; Armenia	245 kg	Hojamuhammet Toýçyýew; Turkmenistan	240 kg
Total	Lasha Talakhadze; Georgia	474 kg WR	Gor Minasyan; Armenia	450 kg	Fernando Reis; Brazil	436 kg

=== Women ===
Event	Gold		Silver		Bronze	
45 kg
Snatch	Chiraphan Nanthawong; Thailand	76 kg	Ýulduz Jumabaýewa; Turkmenistan	75 kg	Alessandra Pagliaro; Italy	70 kg
Clean & Jerk	Ýulduz Jumabaýewa; Turkmenistan	104 kg	Chiraphan Nanthawong; Thailand	95 kg	Katherin Echandía; Venezuela	90 kg
Total	Ýulduz Jumabaýewa; Turkmenistan	179 kg	Chiraphan Nanthawong; Thailand	171 kg	Katherin Echandía; Venezuela	157 kg
49 kg
Snatch	Hou Zhihui; China	93 kg WR	Jiang Huihua; China	92 kg	Beatriz Pirón; Dominican Republic	84 kg
Clean & Jerk	Hou Zhihui; China	115 kg	Jiang Huihua; China	114 kg	Elena Andrieș; Romania	105 kg
Total	Hou Zhihui; China	208 kg WR	Jiang Huihua; China	206 kg	Elena Andrieș; Romania	188 kg
55 kg
Snatch	Li Yajun; China	102 kg WR	Zhang Wanqiong; China	101 kg	Muattar Nabieva; Uzbekistan	98 kg
Clean & Jerk	Zhang Wanqiong; China	124 kg WR	Li Yajun; China	123 kg	Zulfiya Chinshanlo; Kazakhstan	120 kg
Total	Li Yajun; China	225 kg WR	Zhang Wanqiong; China	225 kg	Zulfiya Chinshanlo; Kazakhstan	213 kg
59 kg
Snatch	Kuo Hsing-chun; Chinese Taipei	105 kg WR	Hoàng Thị Duyên; Vietnam	103 kg	Rebeka Koha; Latvia	103 kg
Clean & Jerk	Chen Guiming; China	133 kg WR	Kuo Hsing-chun; Chinese Taipei	132 kg	Mikiko Ando; Japan	131 kg
Total	Kuo Hsing-chun; Chinese Taipei	237 kg WR	Chen Guiming; China	231 kg	Rebeka Koha; Latvia	227 kg
64 kg
Snatch	Deng Wei; China	112 kg WR	Loredana Toma; Romania	110 kg	Karina Goricheva; Kazakhstan	107 kg
Clean & Jerk	Deng Wei; China	140 kg WR	Rim Un-sim; North Korea	134 kg	Mercedes Pérez; Colombia	127 kg
Total	Deng Wei; China	252 kg WR	Rim Un-sim; North Korea	239 kg	Loredana Toma; Romania	234 kg
71 kg
Snatch	Zhang Wangli; China	115 kg	Nadezda Likhacheva; Kazakhstan	112 kg	Sara Ahmed; Egypt	111 kg
Clean & Jerk	Zhang Wangli; China	152 kg WR	Sara Ahmed; Egypt	141 kg	Mattie Rogers; United States	133 kg
Total	Zhang Wangli; China	267 kg WR	Sara Ahmed; Egypt	252 kg	Nadezda Likhacheva; Kazakhstan	242 kg
76 kg
Snatch	Rim Jong-sim; North Korea	119 kg	Wang Zhouyu; China	118 kg	Neisi Dájomes; Ecuador	117 kg
Clean & Jerk	Wang Zhouyu; China	152 kg	Rim Jong-sim; North Korea	150 kg	Leydi Solís; Colombia	146 kg
Total	Wang Zhouyu; China	270 kg	Rim Jong-sim; North Korea	269 kg	Neisi Dájomes; Ecuador	259 kg
81 kg
Snatch	Lydia Valentín; Spain	113 kg	Raushan Meshitkhanova; Kazakhstan	108 kg	Darya Naumava; Belarus	108 kg
Clean & Jerk	Darya Naumava; Belarus	137 kg	Tamara Salazar; Ecuador	137 kg	Lydia Valentín; Spain	136 kg
Total	Lydia Valentín; Spain	249 kg	Darya Naumava; Belarus	245 kg	Tamara Salazar; Ecuador	242 kg
87 kg
Snatch	Ao Hui; China	117 kg	Crismery Santana; Dominican Republic	116 kg	Kim Un-ju; North Korea	111 kg
Clean & Jerk	Kim Un-ju; North Korea	152 kg	Ao Hui; China	151 kg	María Fernanda Valdés; Chile	140 kg
Total	Ao Hui; China	268 kg	Kim Un-ju; North Korea	263 kg	Crismery Santana; Dominican Republic	254 kg
+87 kg
Snatch	Tatiana Kashirina; Russia	145 kg WR	Meng Suping; China	143 kg	Kim Kuk-hyang; North Korea	130 kg
Clean & Jerk	Tatiana Kashirina; Russia	185 kg WR	Meng Suping; China	184 kg	Kim Kuk-hyang; North Korea	165 kg
Total	Tatiana Kashirina; Russia	330 kg WR	Meng Suping; China	327 kg	Kim Kuk-hyang; North Korea	295 kg

== Medal table ==
Ranking by Big (Total result) medals

Rank	Nation	Gold	Silver	Bronze	Total
1	China	9	8	2	19
2	Iran	2	0	1	3
3	Russia	2	0	0	2
4	North Korea	1	3	1	5
5	Armenia	1	1	0	2
6	Georgia	1	0	1	2
7	Chinese Taipei	1	0	0	1
7	Indonesia	1	0	0	1
7	Spain	1	0	0	1
7	Turkmenistan	1	0	0	1
11	Belarus	0	2	1	3
12	Egypt	0	2	0	2
13	Kazakhstan	0	1	2	3
14	South Korea	0	1	0	1
14	Thailand	0	1	0	1
14	Ukraine	0	1	0	1
17	Romania	0	0	3	3
18	Ecuador	0	0	2	2
18	Venezuela	0	0	2	2
20	Brazil	0	0	1	1
20	Dominican Republic	0	0	1	1
20	Italy	0	0	1	1
20	Latvia	0	0	1	1
20	Poland	0	0	1	1
Totals (24 entries)		20	20	20	60

Ranking by all medals: Big (Total result) and Small (Snatch and Clean & Jerk)

Rank	Nation	Gold	Silver	Bronze	Total
1	China	26	23	5	54
2	North Korea	5	5	5	15
3	Iran	5	1	2	8
4	Russia	5	0	1	6
5	Georgia	3	0	2	5
6	Indonesia	3	0	0	3
7	Armenia	2	5	0	7
8	Turkmenistan	2	1	1	4
9	Chinese Taipei	2	1	0	3
10	Spain	2	0	2	4
11	Belarus	1	4	3	8
12	Egypt	1	3	2	6
13	Thailand	1	2	0	3
14	Uzbekistan	1	1	2	4
15	Chile	1	0	1	2
16	Kazakhstan	0	4	4	8
17	Ukraine	0	2	1	3
18	South Korea	0	2	0	2
18	Vietnam	0	2	0	2
20	Romania	0	1	4	5
21	Ecuador	0	1	3	4
22	Dominican Republic	0	1	2	3
23	Poland	0	1	1	2
24	Colombia	0	0	5	5
24	Venezuela	0	0	5	5
26	Italy	0	0	2	2
26	Latvia	0	0	2	2
28	Brazil	0	0	1	1
28	Bulgaria	0	0	1	1
28	Japan	0	0	1	1
28	Qatar	0	0	1	1
28	United States	0	0	1	1
Totals (32 entries)		60	60	60	180

== Team ranking ==
=== Men ===
Rank	Team	Points
1	China	724
2	Belarus	468
3	Iran	452
4	Russia	434
5	Georgia	395
6	South Korea	391

=== Women ===
Rank	Team	Points
1	China	797
2	Kazakhstan	488
3	Russia	483
4	United States	462
5	Mexico	421
6	North Korea	368

== Participating nations ==
A total of 582 competitors from 85 nations participated.

- Albania (5)
- Algeria (2)
- Armenia (8)
- Australia (5)
- Austria (1)
- Azerbaijan (7)
- Bangladesh (1)
- Belarus (16)
- Belgium (2)
- Brazil (4)
- Bulgaria (8)
- Canada (13)
- Chile (4)
- China (20)
- Chinese Taipei (12)
- Colombia (13)
- Croatia (1)
- Cuba (3)
- Czech Republic (8)
- Denmark (9)
- Dominican Republic (7)
- Ecuador (10)
- Egypt (5)
- Estonia (1)
- Finland (9)
- France (5)
- Georgia (7)
- Germany (11)
- Ghana (2)
- Great Britain (8)
- Greece (3)
- Hungary (3)
- Iceland (3)
- India (5)
- Indonesia (10)
- Iran (8)
- Iraq (5)
- Ireland (1)
- Israel (6)
- Italy (10)
- Japan (20)
- Kazakhstan (20)
- Kosovo (2)
- Latvia (4)
- Lebanon (1)
- Lithuania (6)
- Malta (1)
- Mauritius (1)
- Mexico (19)
- Moldova (4)
- Mongolia (4)
- New Zealand (2)
- Nigeria (5)
- North Korea (12)
- Norway (3)
- Peru (2)
- Philippines (5)
- Poland (9)
- Puerto Rico (8)
- Qatar (1)
- Romania (4)
- Russia (20)
- Saint Vincent and the Grenadines (1)
- Samoa (5)
- Saudi Arabia (2)
- Serbia (2)
- Slovakia (8)
- Slovenia (1)
- South Africa (6)
- South Korea (19)
- Spain (12)
- Sweden (3)
- Switzerland (2)
- Thailand (19)
- Tonga (2)
- Tunisia (2)
- Turkey (17)
- Turkmenistan (8)
- Ukraine (10)
- United Arab Emirates (1)
- United States (20)
- Uruguay (1)
- Uzbekistan (12)
- Venezuela (10)
- Vietnam (5)
