= Salwan Jasim =

Iraqi weightlifter (born 1991)

Salwan Jasim Abbood
Personal information
- Full name: Salwan Jasim Abbood Alaifuri
- Born: 26 September 1991 (age 34) Baghdad, Iraq
- Height: 1.80 m (5 ft 11 in)
- Weight: 104 kg (229 lb)

Sport
- Country: Iraq
- Sport: Weightlifting
Medal record
Men's weightlifting
Representing Iraq
Islamic Solidarity Games
Silver medal – second place	2017 Baku	105 kg
- Updated on 9 April 2017

Salwan Jasim Abbood (born 26 September 1991) is an Iraqi male weightlifter, competing in the 105 kg category and representing Iraq at international competitions. He placed ninth in the men's 105 kg event at the 2016 Summer Olympics.

Salwan was banned in 2011 for a period of two years for doping (stanozolol.) His ban ended mid 2013.

== Major results ==
Year	Venue	Weight	Snatch (kg)				Clean & Jerk (kg)				Total	Rank
Year	Venue	Weight	1	2	3	Rank	1	2	3	Rank	Total	Rank
World Championships
2010	Antalya, Turkey	105 kg	153	~~158~~	~~158~~	---	190	195	~~201~~	---	0	---
2009	Goyang, South Korea	94 kg	145	~~150~~	150	20	180	185	190	20	340	20
