= Ruslan Nurudinov =

Uzbekistani weightlifter (born 1991)

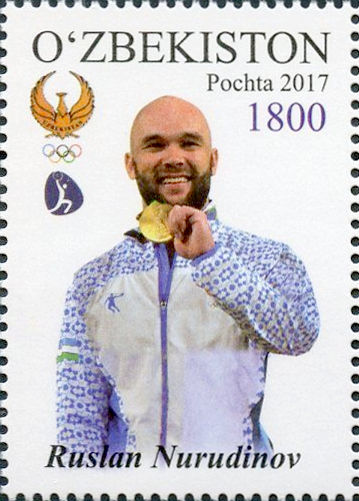
- Nurudinov on a 2017 stamp of Uzbekistan

Personal information
- Nationality: Republic of Uzbekistan
- Born: 24 November 1991 (age 34) Andijan, Uzbekistan
- Years active: 2010–present
- Height: 1.86 m (6 ft 1 in)
- Weight: 109 kg (240 lb)

Sport
- Country: Uzbekistan
- Sport: Weightlifting
- Event: –109 kg
- Turned pro: 2010

Achievements and titles
- Personal bests: Snatch: 194 kg (2016); Clean & jerk: 242 kg (2024, WR); Total: 432 kg (2014)
Medal record
Men's weightlifting
Representing Uzbekistan
Olympic Games
Gold medal – first place	2016 Rio de Janeiro	– 105 kg
World Championships
Gold medal – first place	2013 Wrocław	105 kg
Gold medal – first place	2022 Bogotá	109 kg
Gold medal – first place	2024 Manama	109 kg
Silver medal – second place	2014 Almaty	105 kg
Silver medal – second place	2021 Tashkent	109 kg
Silver medal – second place	2023 Riyadh	109 kg
Bronze medal – third place	2025 Førde	110 kg
Asian Games
Gold medal – first place	2018 Jakarta	105 kg
Bronze medal – third place	2022 Hangzhou	109 kg
Asian Championships
Gold medal – first place	2012 Pyeongtaek	-105 kg
Gold medal – first place	2013 Astana	-105 kg
Gold medal – first place	2020 Tashkent	-109 kg
Gold medal – first place	2023 Jinju	-109 kg
Gold medal – first place	2024 Tashkent	-109 kg
Summer Universiade
Gold medal – first place	2013 Kazan	−105 kg
Islamic Solidarity Games
Gold medal – first place	2021 Konya	−109 kg

Ruslan Shamilevich Nurudinov (Uzbek: Ruslan Shamil'evich Nurudinov; born 24 November 1991) is an Uzbekistani weightlifter of Tatar ethnic origin. He is the first world champion for Uzbekistan in weightlifting (2013). Nurudinov won a gold medal at the 2016 Olympics, setting a new Olympic record in the clean and jerk at 237 kg.

== Career ==
At the 2013 World Championships which held was in Poland, Nurudinov became the world champion for the first time, confidently winning the snatch (190 kg) and clean and jerk (235 kg). And in the double-event total he took a gold medal with a result of 425 kg.

In 2014, at the World Championships held in Almaty, Nurudinov, in an uncompromising fight for first place with Kazakh and Russian weightlifters, broke the world record in the clean and jerk - 239 kg, then Russian David Bedzhanyan regained the highest world achievement - 240 kg, and finally, Kazakh Ilya Ilyin set the final world record in clean and jerk at 242 kg. As a result, the Uzbek athlete was first in the snatch (193 kg), third in the clean and jerk (239 kg) and took the second place in the combined event (432 kg).

At the 2016 Summer Olympics in Rio de Janeiro, Nurudinov, in the absence of the disqualified Ilyin, won the snatch (194 kg), set an Olympic record in the clean and jerk (237 kg) and by a large margin won a gold medal with a combined total of 431 kg.

At the beginning of November 2018, at the World Championships in Ashgabat, an Uzbek athlete in the new weight category of up to 109 kg failed his performance in the snatch, failed to take the initial weight of 188 kg. But in the clean and jerk he managed to win a small bronze medal with a weight on the barbell of 227 kg. To get a big bronze medal in total, he only had to pull out a barbell weighing 177 kg.

== Major results ==
Year	Venue	Weight	Snatch (kg)				Clean & Jerk (kg)				Total	Rank
Year	Venue	Weight	1	2	3	Rank	1	2	3	Rank	Total	Rank
Olympic Games
2012	London, United Kingdom	105 kg	184	~~188~~	~~190~~	5	220	~~226~~	~~226~~	3	404	DSQ
2016	Rio de Janeiro, Brazil	105 kg	190	194	~~197~~	2	225	230	237 OR	1	431	1st place, gold medalist(s)
World Championships
2010	Antalya, Turkey	85 kg	~~165~~	165	~~169~~	7	~~197~~	197	~~201~~	10	362	10
2011	Paris, France	94 kg	~~177~~	177	~~180~~	8	215	221	~~225~~	2nd place, silver medalist(s)	398	5
2013	Wrocław, Poland	105 kg	~~190~~	190	~~195~~	1st place, gold medalist(s)	225	230	235	1st place, gold medalist(s)	425	1st place, gold medalist(s)
2014	Almaty, Kazakhstan	105 kg	185	190	193	1st place, gold medalist(s)	220	230	239 WR	3rd place, bronze medalist(s)	432	2nd place, silver medalist(s)
2018	Ashgabat, Turkmenistan	109 kg	~~187~~	~~189~~	~~189~~	--	222	227	~~238~~	3rd place, bronze medalist(s)	--	--
2021	Tashkent, Uzbekistan	109 kg	~~185~~	185	~~189~~	3rd place, bronze medalist(s)	227	236	~~242~~	2nd place, silver medalist(s)	421	2nd place, silver medalist(s)
2022	Bogotá, Colombia	109 kg	~~177~~	177	~~180~~	1st place, gold medalist(s)	217	~~220~~	220	1st place, gold medalist(s)	397	1st place, gold medalist(s)
2023	Riyadh, Saudi Arabia	109 kg	175	180	~~185~~	4	221	227	~~236~~	1st place, gold medalist(s)	407	2nd place, silver medalist(s)
2024	Manama, Bahrain	109 kg	182	~~187~~	~~187~~	5	223	230	242 CWR	1st place, gold medalist(s)	424	1st place, gold medalist(s)
2025	Førde, Norway	110 kg	183	186	~~190~~	4	224	228	~~233~~	3rd place, bronze medalist(s)	414	3rd place, bronze medalist(s)
Asian Games
2010	Guangzhou, China	94 kg	170	~~175~~	~~175~~	4	205	209	~~214~~	4	379	5
2018	Jakarta, Indonesia	105 kg	183	187	191	1	222	230	--	1	421	1st place, gold medalist(s)
2023	Hangzhou, China	109 kg	~~175~~	175	~~178~~	4	216	--	--	3	391	3rd place, bronze medalist(s)
Asian Championships
2011	Tongling, China	94 kg	~~160~~	~~160~~	160	6	~~200~~	~~200~~	200	5	360	5
2012	Pyeongtaek, South Korea	105 kg	180	184	~~187~~	2nd place, silver medalist(s)	220	~~228~~	~~230~~	1st place, gold medalist(s)	404	1st place, gold medalist(s)
2013	Astana, Kazakhstan	105 kg	185	190	~~196~~	1st place, gold medalist(s)	220	230	--	1st place, gold medalist(s)	420	1st place, gold medalist(s)
2016	Tashkent, Uzbekistan	+105 kg	183	188	191	1st place, gold medalist(s)	225	230	235	4	426	4
2020	Tashkent, Uzbekistan	109 kg	183	~~188~~	188	3rd place, bronze medalist(s)	228	235	241 WR	1st place, gold medalist(s)	429	1st place, gold medalist(s)
2023	Jinju, South Korea	109 kg	170	175	177	2nd place, silver medalist(s)	213	221	228	1st place, gold medalist(s)	405	1st place, gold medalist(s)
2024	Tashkent, Uzbekistan	109 kg	165	170	175	2nd place, silver medalist(s)	~~207~~	207	--	1st place, gold medalist(s)	382	1st place, gold medalist(s)
Summer Universiade
2013	Kazan, Russia	105 kg	184	~~188~~	190	1st place, gold medalist(s)	215	222	--	3rd place, bronze medalist(s)	412	1st place, gold medalist(s)
