= Andrei Aramnau =

Belarusian weightlifter (born 1988)

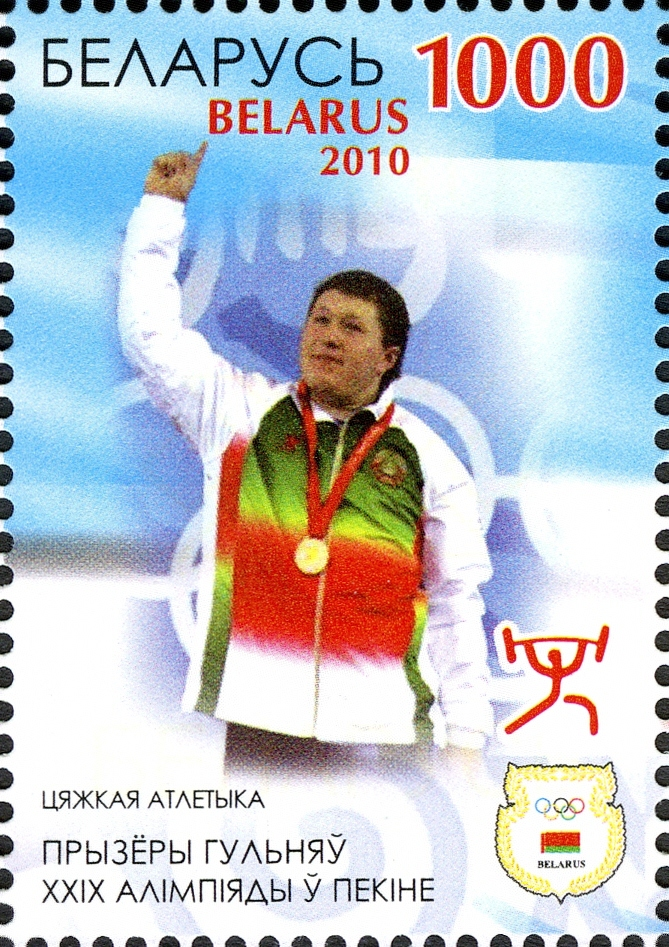
- Andrei Aramnau on a 2010 Belarusian stamp

Personal information
- Nationality: Belarusian
- Born: 17 April 1988 (age 38) Barysaw, Byelorussian SSR, Soviet Union (now Belarus)
- Height: 1.72 m (5 ft 8 in)
- Weight: 108.85 kg (240 lb)

Sport
- Country: Belarus
- Sport: Weightlifting
- Event: –109 kg
- Club: Dynamo Minsk; Dynamo Mahilyow
Medal record
Men's weightlifting
Representing Belarus
Olympic Games
| Gold medal – first place | 2008 Beijing | –105 kg |
World Championships
| Gold medal – first place | 2007 Chiang Mai | –105 kg |
| Silver medal – second place | 2019 Pattaya | –109 kg |
European Championships
| Silver medal – second place | 2019 Batumi | –105 kg |
| Bronze medal – third place | 2014 Tel Aviv | –105 kg |

Andrei Mikalajevič Aramnaǔ (Belarusian: Андрэй Мікалаевіч Арамнаў, born 17 April 1988) is a Belarusian weightlifter, Olympic and World Champion.

== Career ==
Andrei was born with six fingers on one hand, but had one removed in 2002 before his coach allowed him to train for the European Championships.

He won silver in the 94 kg category at the 2006 Junior World Championships, with a total of 393 kg. At the 2007 Junior World Championships he won gold in the 105 kg category, with a total of 407 kg.

Aramnau became world champion in the 105 kg category at the 2007 World Championships, with a total of 423 kg.

At the 2008 Summer Olympics he won the gold medal in the 105 kg category with world records in the snatch with 200 kg, in the clean and jerk with 236 kg, and with a total of 436 kg. These records have been nullified after the International Weightlifting Federation reorganized the categories. He was scheduled to compete at the 2012 Olympic Games but injured his leg in training and did not compete.

He was named 2008 Belarus Athlete of the Year.

He won the gold medal in the 105 kg category at the 2010 European Championships, with 420 kg in total but then had the medal stripped due to a doping violation.

== Major results ==
| Year | Venue | Weight | Snatch (kg) | | | | Clean & Jerk (kg) | | | | Total | Rank |
| Year | Venue | Weight | 1 | 2 | 3 | Rank | 1 | 2 | 3 | Rank | Total | Rank |
Olympic Games
| 2008 | Beijing, China | 105 kg | 193 | 197 | 200 WR | 1 | 225 | 230 | 236 | 1 | 436 WR | 1st place, gold medalist(s) |
World Championships
| 2007 | Chiang Mai, Thailand | 105 kg | 187 | 192 | 195 | 1st place, gold medalist(s) | 220 | 225 | 228 | 2nd place, silver medalist(s) | 423 | 1st place, gold medalist(s) |
| 2018 | Ashgabat, Turkmenistan | 109 kg | 175 | ~~181~~ | 182 | 5 | 210 | ~~215~~ | ~~215~~ | 16 | 392 | 9 |
| 2019 | Pattaya, Thailand | 109 kg | 188 | 193 | 198 | 2nd place, silver medalist(s) | 220 | 225 | 228 | 3rd place, bronze medalist(s) | 426 | 2nd place, silver medalist(s) |
European Championships
| 2010 | Minsk, Belarus | 105 kg | 195 | ~~201~~ | ~~201~~ | -- | 220 | 225 | -- | -- | 420 | DSQ |
| 2014 | Tel Aviv, Israel | 105 kg | 177 | 182 | 184 | 1st place, gold medalist(s) | ~~212~~ | 212 | ~~220~~ | 5 | 396 | 3rd place, bronze medalist(s) |
| 2019 | (Georgia (country)) Batumi, Georgia | 109 kg | 181 | 186 | 190 | 3rd place, bronze medalist(s) | 216 | 221 | ~~226~~ | 4 | 411 | 2nd place, silver medalist(s) |
Qatar Cup
| 2018 | Doha, Qatar | 109 kg | 173 | 179 | 183 | 1st place, gold medalist(s) | 208 | 218 | - | 2nd place, silver medalist(s) | 401 | 1st place, gold medalist(s) |
Junior World Championships
| 2006 | Hangzhou, China | 94 kg | 177 | | | 1st place, gold medalist(s) | 216 | | | 2nd place, silver medalist(s) | 393 | 2nd place, silver medalist(s) |
| 2007 | Prague, Czech Republic | 105 kg | 187 | | | 1st place, gold medalist(s) | 220 | | | 2nd place, silver medalist(s) | 407 | 1st place, gold medalist(s) |
