= Öwez Öwezow =

Turkmen weightlifter

Personal information
- Citizenship: Turkmen
- Born: 11 June 1997 (age 27)

Sport
- Country: Turkmenistan
- Sport: Weightlifting
- Weight class: 109 kg

Öwez Öwezow (born 11 June 1997) is a Turkmen weightlifter. He represented Turkmenistan at the 2020 Summer Olympics in Tokyo, Japan.
