= Arkadiusz Michalski =

Polish weightlifter (born 1990)

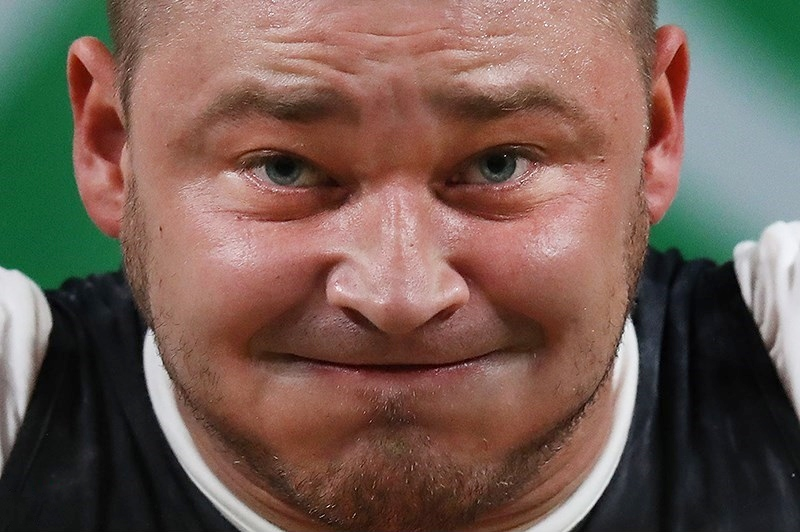

Personal information
- Nationality: Polish
- Born: 7 January 1990 (age 36) Głogów, Poland
- Height: 1.80 m (5 ft 11 in)
- Weight: 108.89 kg (240 lb)

Sport
- Country: Poland
- Sport: Weightlifting
- Event: –109 kg
Medal record
Men's Weightlifting
Representing Poland
World Championships
Bronze medal – third place	2018 Ashgabat	–109 kg
European Championships
Gold medal – first place	2018 Bucharest	–105 kg
Silver medal – second place	2016 Forde	–105 kg
Silver medal – second place	2015 Tbilisi	–105 kg
Bronze medal – third place	2017 Split	–105 kg

Arkadiusz Michalski (born 7 January 1990) is a Polish Olympic weightlifter. He represented his country at the 2016 Summer Olympics.
