= Yang Zhe =

Chinese weightlifter (born 1991)

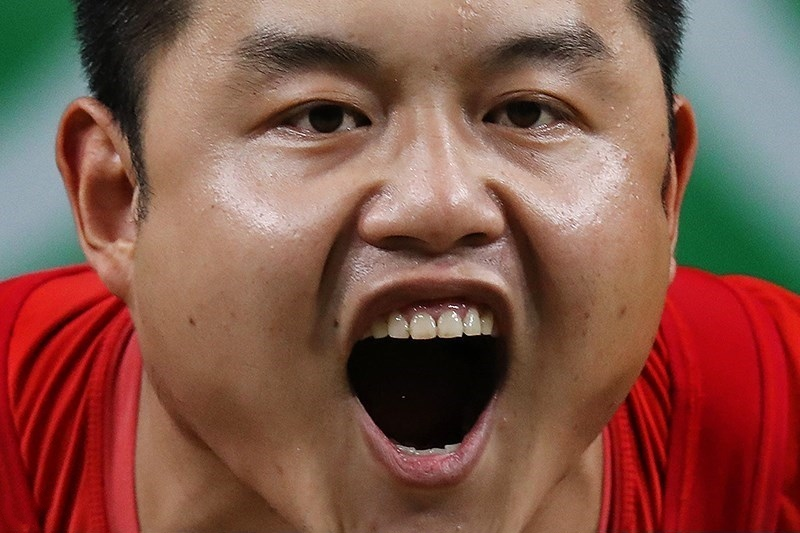

Personal information
- Nationality: Chinese
- Born: 14 July 1991 (age 34) Chaoyang, China
- Height: 1.87 m (6 ft 2 in)
- Weight: 108.95 kg (240 lb)

Sport
- Country: China
- Sport: Weightlifting
- Event: –109 kg
- Club: Shandong Province

Achievements and titles
- Personal bests: Snatch: 200 kg (2021, CWR); Clean and jerk: 225 kg (2016); Total: 420 kg (2019)
Medal record
Men's weightlifting
Representing China
World Championships
Silver medal – second place	2018 Ashgabat	–109 kg
Bronze medal – third place	2019 Pattaya	–109 kg
Asian Games
Gold medal – first place	2010 Guangzhou	–105 kg
Gold medal – first place	2014 Incheon	–105 kg
Asian Championships
Gold medal – first place	2011 Tongling	–105 kg
Gold medal – first place	2019 Ningbo	–109 kg
Bronze medal – third place	2020 Tashkent	–109 kg
National Games of China
Gold medal – first place	2009 Shandong	–105 kg
Gold medal – first place	2013 Liaoning	–105 kg
Gold medal – first place	2017 Tianjin	–105 kg
Gold medal – first place	2021 Shaanxi	–109 kg

Yang Zhe (born 14 July 1991) is a Chinese weightlifter. He competed for men's 105 kg weightlifting at Guangzhou Asia 2010 and won the gold medal. He also won the gold medal in 2014 Asian Games. He competed at the 2016 Summer Olympics in the Men's 105 kg.

== Major results ==
Year	Venue	Weight	Snatch (kg)				Clean & Jerk (kg)				Total	Rank
Year	Venue	Weight	1	2	3	Rank	1	2	3	Rank	Total	Rank
Olympic Games
2016	Rio de Janeiro, Brazil	105 kg	190	~~195~~	~~197~~	4	220	225	~~227~~	3	415	4
World Championships
2014	Almaty, Kazakhstan	105 kg	~~186~~	191	~~193~~	2nd place, silver medalist(s)	~~220~~	220	~~223~~	6	411	4
2018	Ashgabat, Turkmenistan	109 kg	186	191	196	1st place, gold medalist(s)	215	220	223	4	419	2nd place, silver medalist(s)
2019	Pattaya, Thailand	109 kg	187	192	197	3rd place, bronze medalist(s)	217	223	~~227~~	5	420	3rd place, bronze medalist(s)
