= List of Taiwanese records in Olympic weightlifting =

The following are the national records in Olympic weightlifting in Chinese Taipei. Records are maintained in each weight class for the snatch lift, clean and jerk lift, and the total for both lifts by the Chinese Taipei Weightlifting Association (CTWA).

== Current records ==
Key to tables: Awaiting ratification Not ratified or later rescinded by CTWA

=== Men ===
Event	Record	Athlete	Date	Meet	Place	Ref
60 kg
Snatch	106 kg	Tang Chun-yen	4 February 2026		Taichung, Taiwan	
Clean & Jerk	133 kg	Tang Chun-yen	4 February 2026		Taichung, Taiwan	
Total	239 kg	Tang Chun-yen	4 February 2026		Taichung, Taiwan	
65 kg
Snatch	123 kg	Kao Chan-hung	4 October 2025	World Championships	Førde, Norway	
Clean & Jerk	148 kg	Kao Chan-hung	4 October 2025	World Championships	Førde, Norway	
Total	271 kg	Kao Chan-hung	4 October 2025	World Championships	Førde, Norway	
70 kg
Snatch						
Clean & Jerk						
Total						
75 kg
Snatch	155 kg	Chiang Tsung-han	26 September 2026	Asian Games	Nagoya, Japan	
Clean & Jerk	182 kg	Chiang Tsung-han	26 September 2026	Asian Games	Nagoya, Japan	
Total	337 kg	Chiang Tsung-han	26 September 2026	Asian Games	Nagoya, Japan	
85 kg
Snatch	150 kg	Hsieh Meng-en	28 September 2026	Asian Games	Nagoya, Japan	
Clean & Jerk	192 kg	Hsieh Meng-en	28 September 2026	Asian Games	Nagoya, Japan	
Total	342 kg	Hsieh Meng-en	28 September 2026	Asian Games	Nagoya, Japan	
95 kg
Snatch						
Clean & Jerk						
Total						
110 kg
Snatch	195 kg	Chen Po-jen	5 February 2026		Taichung, Taiwan	
Clean & Jerk	221 kg	Chen Po-jen	11 August 2025	Presidents Cup	Taoyuan, Taiwan	
Total	410 kg	Chen Po-jen	5 February 2026		Taichung, Taiwan	
+110 kg
Snatch	180 kg	Dong Bing-cheng	5 February 2026		Taichung, Taiwan	
Clean & Jerk	220 kg	Dong Bing-cheng	5 February 2026		Taichung, Taiwan	
Total	400 kg	Dong Bing-cheng	5 February 2026		Taichung, Taiwan	

=== Women ===
Event	Record	Athlete	Date	Meet	Place	Ref
49 kg
Snatch						
Clean & Jerk						
Total						
53 kg
Snatch	84 kg	Juang Yi-ci	11 August 2025	Presidents Cup	Taoyuan, Taiwan	
Snatch	87 kg	Lin Cheng-jing	29 October 2026	World Championships	Ningbo, China	
Clean & Jerk	113 kg	Chen Guan-ling	3 October 2025	World Championships	Førde, Norway	
Total	189 kg	Cheng Ting-yi	11 August 2025	Presidents Cup	Taoyuan, Taiwan	
Total	197 kg	Lin Cheng-jing	29 October 2026	World Championships	Ningbo, China	
57 kg
Snatch						
Clean & Jerk						
Total						
61 kg
Snatch						
Clean & Jerk						
Total						
69 kg
Snatch	108 kg	Chen Wen-huei	10 April 2026		Taoyuan, Taiwan	
Clean & Jerk	135 kg	Chen Wen-huei	15 May 2026	Asian Championships	Gandhinagar, India	
Total	239 kg	Chen Wen-huei	15 May 2026	Asian Championships	Gandhinagar, India	
77 kg
Snatch	100 kg	Yang Shu-ting	10 April 2026		Taoyuan, Taiwan	
Clean & Jerk	120 kg	Yang Shu-ting	10 April 2026		Taoyuan, Taiwan	
Total	220 kg	Yang Shu-ting	10 April 2026		Taoyuan, Taiwan	
86 kg
Snatch	110 kg	Lo Ying-yuan	12 August 2025	Presidents Cup	Taoyuan, Taiwan	
Clean & Jerk	141 kg	Lo Ying-yuan	12 August 2025	Presidents Cup	Taoyuan, Taiwan	
Total	251 kg	Lo Ying-yuan	12 August 2025	Presidents Cup	Taoyuan, Taiwan	
+86 kg
Snatch	112 kg	Wang Ling-chen	10 April 2026		Taoyuan, Taiwan	
Clean & Jerk	150 kg	Wang Ling-chen	17 May 2026	Asian Championships	Gandhinagar, India	
Total	260 kg	Wang Ling-chen	17 May 2026	Asian Championships	Gandhinagar, India	

== Historical records ==
=== Men (2025–2026) ===
Event	Record	Athlete	Date	Meet	Place	Ref
71 kg
Snatch	145 kg	Chen Wang-heng	4 February 2026		Taichung, Taiwan	
Clean & Jerk	170 kg	Chen Wang-heng	4 February 2026		Taichung, Taiwan	
Total	315 kg	Chen Wang-heng	4 February 2026		Taichung, Taiwan	
79 kg
Snatch	151 kg	Chiang Tsung-han	14 May 2026	Asian Championships	Gandhinagar, India	
Clean & Jerk	185 kg	Chiang Tsung-han	11 August 2025	Presidents Cup	Taoyuan, Taiwan	
Total	335 kg	Chiang Tsung-han	11 August 2025	Presidents Cup	Taoyuan, Taiwan	
88 kg
Snatch	160 kg	Hsieh Meng-en	9 April 2026		Taoyuan, Taiwan	
Clean & Jerk	200 kg	Hsieh Meng-en	9 April 2026		Taoyuan, Taiwan	
Total	360 kg	Hsieh Meng-en	9 April 2026		Taoyuan, Taiwan	
94 kg
Snatch	155 kg	Chen Hsiang-yu	9 April 2026		Taoyuan, Taiwan	
Clean & Jerk	187 kg	Chen Hsiang-yu	9 April 2026		Taoyuan, Taiwan	
Total	338 kg	Chen Hsiang-yu	9 April 2026		Taoyuan, Taiwan	

=== Men (2018–2025) ===
Event	Record	Athlete	Date	Meet	Place	Ref
55 kg
Snatch	101 kg	Guo Ding-nan	13 April 2019	National Intercollegiate Games	Minxiong, Taiwan	
Clean & Jerk	123 kg	Chen Chia-lung	1 February 2021	Taiwanese Junior Championships	Taipei, Taiwan	
Total	223 kg	Lin Zhi-ting	13 April 2019	National Intercollegiate Games	Minxiong, Taiwan	
61 kg
Snatch	129 kg	Kao Chan-hung	18 April 2021	Asian Championships	Tashkent, Uzbekistan	
Clean & Jerk	158 kg	Kao Chan-hung	19 September 2019	World Championships	Pattaya, Thailand	
Total	283 kg	Kao Chan-hung	19 September 2019	World Championships	Pattaya, Thailand	
67 kg
Snatch	134 kg	Kao Chan-hung	16 September 2020	Presidents Cup	Taoyuan, Taiwan	
Clean & Jerk	168 kg	Kao Chan-hung	16 September 2020	Presidents Cup	Taoyuan, Taiwan	
Total	302 kg	Kao Chan-hung	16 September 2020	Presidents Cup	Taoyuan, Taiwan	
73 kg
Snatch	149 kg	Chiang Tsung-han	4 May 2024	National Intercollegiate Games	Taichung, Taiwan	
Clean & Jerk	177 kg	Chiang Tsung-han	4 April 2024	World Cup	Phuket, Thailand	
Total	321 kg	Chiang Tsung-han	12 May 2025	Asian Championships	Jiangshan, China	
81 kg
Snatch	154 kg	Chuang Sheng-min	6 August 2020		Kaohsiung, Taiwan	
Clean & Jerk	191 kg	Hsieh Meng-en	18 October 2021	National Games	New Taipei City, Taiwan	
Total	340 kg	Hsieh Meng-en	2 February 2021	Taiwanese Junior Championships	Taipei, Taiwan	
89 kg
Snatch	157 kg	Hsieh Meng-en	8 February 2024	Asian Championships	Tashkent, Uzbekistan	
Clean & Jerk	200 kg	Hsieh Meng-en	5 April 2024	World Cup	Phuket, Thailand	
Total	355 kg	Hsieh Meng-en	5 April 2024	World Cup	Phuket, Thailand	
96 kg
Snatch	177 kg	Chen Po-jen	15 October 2022	Asian Championships	Manama, Bahrain	
Clean & Jerk	206 kg	Chen Po-jen	15 October 2022	Asian Championships	Manama, Bahrain	
Total	383 kg	Chen Po-jen	15 October 2022	Asian Championships	Manama, Bahrain	
102 kg
Snatch	181 kg	Chen Po-jen	12 May 2023	Asian Championships	Jinju, South Korea	
Clean & Jerk	206 kg	Chen Po-jen	9 February 2024	Asian Championships	Tashkent, Uzbekistan	
Clean & Jerk	208 kg	Chen Po-jen	16 June 2023	IWF Grand Prix	Havana, Cuba	
Total	386 kg	Chen Po-jen	12 May 2023	Asian Championships	Jinju, South Korea	
109 kg
Snatch	179 kg	Chen Po-jen	24 February 2025		Kaohsiung, Taiwan	
Clean & Jerk	211 kg	Dong Bing-cheng	15 December 2022	World Championships	Bogotá, Colombia	
Total	382 kg	Chen Po-jen	24 February 2025		Kaohsiung, Taiwan	
+109 kg
Snatch	187 kg	Chen Shih-chieh	28 April 2019	Asian Championships	Ningbo, China	
Snatch	190 kg	Chen Shih-chieh	27 September 2019	World Championships	Pattaya, Thailand	
Clean & Jerk	235 kg	Chen Shih-chieh	28 April 2019	Asian Championships	Ningbo, China	
Total	422 kg	Chen Shih-chieh	28 April 2019	Asian Championships	Ningbo, China	
Total	425 kg	Chen Shih-chieh	27 September 2019	World Championships	Pattaya, Thailand	

=== Men (1998–2018) ===
Event	Record	Athlete	Date	Meet	Place	Ref
-56 kg
Snatch	128 kg	Yang Chin-yi	10 August 2008	Olympic Games	Beijing, China	
Clean & Jerk	160 kg	Wang Shin-yuan	2 May 2000	Asian Championships	Osaka, Japan	
Total	285 kg	Wang Shin-yuan	2 May 2000	Asian Championships	Osaka, Japan	
-62 kg
Snatch	134 kg	Yang Sheng-hsiung	14 November 2010	Asian Games	Guangzhou, China	
Clean & Jerk	170 kg	Yang Sheng-hsiung	21 November 2009	World Championships	Goyang, South Korea	
Total	302 kg	Yang Sheng-hsiung	14 November 2010	Asian Games	Guangzhou, China	
-69 kg
Snatch	140 kg	Pan Chien-hung	22 September 2014	Asian Games	Incheon, South Korea	
Clean & Jerk	173 kg	Pan Chien-hung	22 June 2013	Asian Championships	Astana, Kazakhstan	
Total	309 kg	Wu Tsung-ling	8 June 2008	National Universiade Championships	Taichung, Taiwan	
-77 kg
Snatch	145 kg	Pan Chien-hung	26 March 2015	National Championships	Taoyuan, Taiwan	
Clean & Jerk	181 kg	Chiang Nien-peng	21 October 2013	National Games	Taipei, Taiwan	
Total	320 kg	Chiang Tsung-han	29 January 2018	National Championships	Taoyuan, Taiwan	
-85 kg
Snatch	157 kg	Huang Ze-wei	8 May 2011	National Universiade Championships	Kaohsiung, Taiwan	
Clean & Jerk	189 kg	Hsieh Wei-chun	18 June 2005	National Tryouts	Kaohsiung, Taiwan	
Total	337 kg	Huang Ze-wei	5 January 2012	National Tryouts	Kaohsiung, Taiwan	
-94 kg
Snatch	166 kg	Chen Po-jen	3 December 2017	World Championships	Anaheim, United States	
Clean & Jerk	201 kg	Hsieh Wei-chun	27 October 2009	National Games	Taichung, Taiwan	
Total	357 kg	Hsieh Wei-chun	30 April 2008	Asian Championships	Kanazawa, Japan	
-105 kg
Snatch	165 kg	Hsieh Wei-chun	15 November 2014	World Championships	Almaty, Kazakhstan	
Clean & Jerk	209 kg	Hsieh Wei-chun	25 September 2014	Asian Games	Incheon, South Korea	
Total	373 kg	Hsieh Wei-chun	25 September 2014	Asian Games	Incheon, South Korea	
+105 kg
Snatch	195 kg	Chen Shih-chieh	28 November 2015	World Championships	Houston, United States	
Clean & Jerk	245 kg	Chen Shih-chieh	11 September 2015	Asian Championships	Phuket, Thailand	
Total	438 kg	Chen Shih-chieh	11 September 2015	Asian Championships	Phuket, Thailand	

=== Women (2025–2026) ===
Event	Record	Athlete	Date	Meet	Place	Ref
48 kg
Snatch	84 kg	Fang Wan-ling	11 May 2026	Asian Championships	Gandhinagar, India	
Clean & Jerk	112 kg	Huang Yi-chen	11 May 2026	Asian Championships	Gandhinagar, India	
Total	193 kg	Huang Yi-chen	11 May 2026	Asian Championships	Gandhinagar, India	
58 kg
Snatch	97 kg	Chen Guan-ling	3 February 2026		Taichung, Taiwan	
Clean & Jerk	128 kg	Kuo Hsing-chun	4 October 2025	World Championships	Førde, Norway	
Total	224 kg	Kuo Hsing-chun	4 October 2025	World Championships	Førde, Norway	
63 kg
Snatch	92 kg	Chiu Yu-ling	11 August 2025	Presidents Cup	Taoyuan, Taiwan	
Clean & Jerk	122 kg	Kuo Hsing-chun	4 February 2026		Taichung, Taiwan	
Total	212 kg	Kuo Hsing-chun	4 February 2026		Taichung, Taiwan	

=== Women (2018–2025) ===
Event	Record	Athlete	Date	Meet	Place	Ref
45 kg
Snatch	75 kg	Huang Yi-chen	28 April 2025	National Intercollegiate Games	Tainan, Taiwan	
Clean & Jerk	95 kg	Huang Yi-chen	28 April 2025	National Intercollegiate Games	Tainan, Taiwan	
Total	170 kg	Huang Yi-chen	28 April 2025	National Intercollegiate Games	Tainan, Taiwan	
49 kg
Snatch	86 kg	Fang Wan-ling	7 August 2024	Olympic Games	Paris, France	
Clean & Jerk	108 kg	Fang Wan-ling	1 April 2024	World Cup	Phuket, Thailand	
Total	193 kg	Fang Wan-ling	7 August 2024	Olympic Games	Paris, France	
55 kg
Snatch	98 kg	Chen Guan-ling	20 September 2024	Junior World Championships	León, Spain	
Clean & Jerk	120 kg	Chen Guan-ling	20 December 2024	Asian Junior Championships	Doha, Qatar	
Total	217 kg	Chen Guan-ling	20 September 2024	Junior World Championships	León, Spain	
59 kg
Snatch	110 kg	Kuo Hsing-chun	19 April 2021	Asian Championships	Tashkent, Uzbekistan	
Clean & Jerk	140 kg	Kuo Hsing-chun	21 September 2019	World Championships	Pattaya, Thailand	
Total	247 kg	Kuo Hsing-chun	19 April 2021	Asian Championships	Tashkent, Uzbekistan	
64 kg
Snatch	107 kg	Kuo Hsing-chun	1 February 2021	Taiwanese Junior Championships	Taipei, Taiwan	
Clean & Jerk	141 kg	Kuo Hsing-chun	11 December 2019	World Cup	Tianjin, China	
Total	246 kg	Kuo Hsing-chun	11 December 2019	World Cup	Tianjin, China	
71 kg
Snatch	108 kg	Chen Wen-huei	7 February 2024	Asian Championships	Tashkent, Uzbekistan	
Clean & Jerk	141 kg	Chen Wen-huei	7 April 2024	World Cup	Phuket, Thailand	
Total	246 kg	Chen Wen-huei	7 April 2024	World Cup	Phuket, Thailand	
76 kg
Snatch	105 kg	Chen Wen-huei	5 October 2023	Asian Games	Hangzhou, China	
Clean & Jerk	138 kg	Chen Wen-huei	28 April 2025	National Intercollegiate Games	Tainan, Taiwan	
Total	243 kg	Chen Wen-huei	28 April 2025	National Intercollegiate Games	Tainan, Taiwan	
81 kg
Snatch	104 kg	Lo Ying-yuan	8 February 2024	Asian Championships	Tashkent, Uzbekistan	
Clean & Jerk	129 kg	Lo Ying-yuan	9 April 2024	World Cup	Phuket, Thailand	
Total	231 kg	Lo Ying-yuan	8 February 2024	Asian Championships	Tashkent, Uzbekistan	
87 kg
Snatch	112 kg	Lo Ying-yuan	15 September 2023	World Championships	Riyadh, Saudi Arabia	
Clean & Jerk	138 kg	Lo Ying-yuan	14 May 2025	Asian Championships	Jiangshan, China	
Total	246 kg	Lo Ying-yuan	14 May 2025	Asian Championships	Jiangshan, China	
+87 kg
Snatch	118 kg	Wang Ling-chen	10 April 2024	World Cup	Phuket, Thailand	
Clean & Jerk	148 kg	Wang Ling-chen	10 April 2024	World Cup	Phuket, Thailand	
Total	266 kg	Wang Ling-chen	10 April 2024	World Cup	Phuket, Thailand	

=== Women (1998–2018) ===
Event	Record	Athlete	Date	Meet	Place	Ref
48 kg
Snatch	87 kg	Chen Wei-ling	11 May 2009	Asian Championships	Taldykorgan, Kazakhstan	
Clean & Jerk	113 kg	Chen Wei-ling	10 March 2009	National Championships	Kaohsiung, Taiwan	
Total	200 kg	Chen Wei-ling	11 May 2009	Asian Championships	Taldykorgan, Kazakhstan	
53 kg
Snatch	103 kg	Hsu Shu-ching	24 May 2014	National Universiade Championships	Kaohsiung, Taiwan	
Clean & Jerk	132 kg	Hsu Shu-ching	21 September 2014	Asian Games	Incheon, South Korea	
Total	233 kg	Hsu Shu-ching	21 September 2014	Asian Games	Incheon, South Korea	
58 kg
Snatch	108 kg	Kuo Hsing-chun	22 October 2013	World Championships	Wrocław, Poland.	
Clean & Jerk	142 kg	Kuo Hsing-chun	21 August 2017	Universiade	New Taipei City, Taiwan	
Total	249 kg	Kuo Hsing-chun	21 August 2017	Universiade	New Taipei City, Taiwan	
63 kg
Snatch	116 kg	Lin Tzu-chi	23 September 2014	Asian Games	Incheon, South Korea	
Clean & Jerk	145 kg	Lin Tzu-chi	23 September 2014	Asian Games	Incheon, South Korea	
Total	261 kg	Lin Tzu-chi	23 September 2014	Asian Games	Incheon, South Korea	
69 kg
Snatch	117 kg	Huang Shih-hsu	28 April 2012	Asian Championships	Pyeongtaek, South Korea	
Clean & Jerk	140 kg	Huang Shih-hsu	15 June 2000	National Tryouts	Taipei, Taiwan	
Total	252 kg	Huang Shih-hsu	28 April 2012	Asian Championships	Pyeongtaek, South Korea	
75 kg
Snatch	116 kg	Huang Shih-hsu	28 August 2007	National Championships	Kaohsiung, Taiwan	
Clean & Jerk	143 kg	Kuo Yi-hang	15 June 2000	National Tryouts	Taipei, Taiwan	
Total	250 kg	Kuo Yi-hang	15 June 2000	National Tryouts	Taipei, Taiwan	
90 kg
Snatch	106 kg	Lo Ying-yuan	25 October 2017	National Games	Yilan, Taiwan	
Clean & Jerk	136 kg	Lo Ying-yuan	28 April 2017	Asian Championships	Ashgabat, Turkmenistan	
Total	240 kg	Lo Ying-yuan	25 October 2017	National Games	Yilan, Taiwan	
+90 kg
Snatch	119 kg	Hsieh Su-hua	8 March 2002	National Championships	Tainan, Taiwan	
Clean & Jerk	157 kg	Chen Chia-ling	16 July 1999	National Championships	Taipei, Taiwan	
Total	270 kg	Chen Chia-ling	16 July 1999	National Championships	Taipei, Taiwan	
