= List of Saudi Arabian records in Olympic weightlifting =

The following are the national records in Olympic weightlifting in Saudi Arabia. Records are maintained in each weight class for the snatch lift, clean and jerk lift, and the total for both lifts by the Saudi Arabian Weightlifting Federation.

== Current records ==
=== Men ===
Event	Record	Athlete	Date	Meet	Place	Ref
60 kg
Snatch	127 kg	Aqeel Al-Jasim	24 September 2026	Asian Games	Nagoya, Japan	
Clean & Jerk	150 kg	Aqeel Al-Jasim	24 September 2026	Asian Games	Nagoya, Japan	
Total	277 kg	Aqeel Al-Jasim	24 September 2026	Asian Games	Nagoya, Japan	
65 kg
Snatch	134 kg	Seraj Al-Saleem	9 November 2025	Islamic Solidarity Games	Riyadh, Saudi Arabia	
Clean & Jerk	169 kg	Seraj Al-Saleem	9 November 2025	Islamic Solidarity Games	Riyadh, Saudi Arabia	
Total	303 kg	Seraj Al-Saleem	9 November 2025	Islamic Solidarity Games	Riyadh, Saudi Arabia	
71 kg
Snatch	127 kg	Ali Al-Hawar	9 November 2025	Islamic Solidarity Games	Riyadh, Saudi Arabia	
Clean & Jerk	154 kg	Ali Al-Hawar	9 November 2025	Islamic Solidarity Games	Riyadh, Saudi Arabia	
Total	281 kg	Ali Al-Hawar	9 November 2025	Islamic Solidarity Games	Riyadh, Saudi Arabia	
79 kg
Snatch	146 kg	Mohammed Al-Marzouq	10 November 2025	Islamic Solidarity Games	Riyadh, Saudi Arabia	
Clean & Jerk	176 kg	Mohammed Al-Marzouq	10 November 2025	Islamic Solidarity Games	Riyadh, Saudi Arabia	
Total	322 kg	Mohammed Al-Marzouq	10 November 2025	Islamic Solidarity Games	Riyadh, Saudi Arabia	
88 kg
Snatch	154 kg	Yousef Al-Medarham	10 November 2025	Islamic Solidarity Games	Riyadh, Saudi Arabia	
Clean & Jerk	182 kg	Yousef Al-Medarham	10 November 2025	Islamic Solidarity Games	Riyadh, Saudi Arabia	
Total	336 kg	Yousef Al-Medarham	10 November 2025	Islamic Solidarity Games	Riyadh, Saudi Arabia	
94 kg
Snatch	157 kg	Ali Al-Othman	11 November 2025	Islamic Solidarity Games	Riyadh, Saudi Arabia	
Clean & Jerk	190 kg	Ali Al-Othman	11 November 2025	Islamic Solidarity Games	Riyadh, Saudi Arabia	
Total	347 kg	Ali Al-Othman	11 November 2025	Islamic Solidarity Games	Riyadh, Saudi Arabia	
110 kg
Snatch	175 kg	Ali Al-Khazal	12 November 2025	Islamic Solidarity Games	Riyadh, Saudi Arabia	
Clean & Jerk	216 kg	Ali Al-Khazal	12 November 2025	Islamic Solidarity Games	Riyadh, Saudi Arabia	
Total	391 kg	Ali Al-Khazal	12 November 2025	Islamic Solidarity Games	Riyadh, Saudi Arabia	
+110 kg
Snatch						
Clean & Jerk						
Total						

=== Women ===
Event	Record	Athlete	Date	Meet	Place	Ref
48 kg
Snatch	52 kg	Ghadah Altassan	8 November 2025	Islamic Solidarity Games	Riyadh, Saudi Arabia	
Clean & Jerk	65 kg	Ghadah Altassan	8 November 2025	Islamic Solidarity Games	Riyadh, Saudi Arabia	
Total	117 kg	Ghadah Altassan	8 November 2025	Islamic Solidarity Games	Riyadh, Saudi Arabia	
53 kg
Snatch	59 kg	Yasmin Almahfoudh	8 November 2025	Islamic Solidarity Games	Riyadh, Saudi Arabia	
Clean & Jerk	77 kg	Yasmin Almahfoudh	8 November 2025	Islamic Solidarity Games	Riyadh, Saudi Arabia	
Total	136 kg	Yasmin Almahfoudh	8 November 2025	Islamic Solidarity Games	Riyadh, Saudi Arabia	
58 kg
Snatch	70 kg	Fatemah Al Kahawaher	9 November 2025	Islamic Solidarity Games	Riyadh, Saudi Arabia	
Clean & Jerk	91 kg	Fatemah Al Kahawaher	9 November 2025	Islamic Solidarity Games	Riyadh, Saudi Arabia	
Total	161 kg	Fatemah Al Kahawaher	9 November 2025	Islamic Solidarity Games	Riyadh, Saudi Arabia	
63 kg
Snatch	74 kg	Alanoud Alshehri	10 November 2025	Islamic Solidarity Games	Riyadh, Saudi Arabia	
Clean & Jerk	90 kg	Alanoud Alshehri	10 November 2025	Islamic Solidarity Games	Riyadh, Saudi Arabia	
Total	164 kg	Alanoud Alshehri	10 November 2025	Islamic Solidarity Games	Riyadh, Saudi Arabia	
69 kg
Snatch						
Clean & Jerk	90 kg	Jannh Al-Amari	10 November 2025	Islamic Solidarity Games	Riyadh, Saudi Arabia	
Total						
77 kg
Snatch						
Clean & Jerk						
Total						
86 kg
Snatch						
Clean & Jerk						
Total						
+86 kg
Snatch						
Clean & Jerk						
Total						

== Historical records ==
=== Men (2018–2025) ===
Event	Record	Athlete	Date	Meet	Place	Ref
55 kg
Snatch	122 kg	Mansour Al-Saleem	20 April 2019	Asian Championships	Ningbo, China	
Clean & Jerk	143 kg	Mansour Al-Saleem	5 September 2023	World Championships	Riyadh, Saudi Arabia	
Total	262 kg	Mansour Al-Saleem	20 April 2019	Asian Championships	Ningbo, China	
61 kg
Snatch	130 kg	Seraj Al-Saleem	1 October 2023	Asian Games	Hangzhou, China	
Clean & Jerk	161 kg	Seraj Al-Saleem	18 April 2021	Asian Championships	Tashkent, Uzbekistan	
Total	288 kg	Seraj Al-Saleem	25 July 2021	Olympic Games	Tokyo, Japan	
67 kg
Snatch	136 kg	Nawaf Al-Mazyadi	12 August 2022	Islamic Solidarity Games	Konya, Turkey	
Clean & Jerk	167 kg	Nawaf Al-Mazyadi	19 April 2021	Asian Championships	Tashkent, Uzbekistan	
Total	302 kg	Nawaf Al-Mazyadi	19 April 2021	Asian Championships	Tashkent, Uzbekistan	
73 kg
Snatch	147 kg	Mahmoud Al-Humayd	3 October 2023	Asian Games	Hangzhou, China	
Clean & Jerk	180 kg	Mahmoud Al-Humayd	3 October 2023	Asian Games	Hangzhou, China	
Total	327 kg	Mahmoud Al-Humayd	3 October 2023	Asian Games	Hangzhou, China	
81 kg
Snatch	144 kg	Mahmoud Al-Humayd	11 September 2023	World Championships	Riyadh, Saudi Arabia	
Clean & Jerk	174 kg	Mahmoud Al-Humayd	11 September 2023	World Championships	Riyadh, Saudi Arabia	
Total	318 kg	Mahmoud Al-Humayd	11 September 2023	World Championships	Riyadh, Saudi Arabia	
89 kg
Snatch	140 kg	Ismail Al-Swyleh	10 September 2023	World Championships	Riyadh, Saudi Arabia	
Clean & Jerk	174 kg	Ismail Al-Swyleh	10 September 2023	World Championships	Riyadh, Saudi Arabia	
Total	314 kg	Ismail Al-Swyleh	10 September 2023	World Championships	Riyadh, Saudi Arabia	
96 kg
Snatch	163 kg	Ali Al-Khazal	14 December 2021	World Championships	Tashkent, Uzbekistan	
Clean & Jerk	195 kg	Ali Al-Khazal	23 April 2021	Asian Championships	Tashkent, Uzbekistan	
Total	357 kg	Ali Al-Khazal	14 December 2021	World Championships	Tashkent, Uzbekistan	
102 kg
Snatch	161 kg	Ali Al-Khazal	15 August 2022	Islamic Solidarity Games	Konya, Turkey	
Clean & Jerk	200 kg	Ali Al-Khazal	15 August 2022	Islamic Solidarity Games	Konya, Turkey	
Total	361 kg	Ali Al-Khazal	15 August 2022	Islamic Solidarity Games	Konya, Turkey	
109 kg
Snatch	175 kg	Ali Al-Khazal	14 May 2025	Asian Championships	Jiangshan, China	
Clean & Jerk	212 kg	Ali Al-Khazal	14 May 2025	Asian Championships	Jiangshan, China	
Total	387 kg	Ali Al-Khazal	14 May 2025	Asian Championships	Jiangshan, China	
+109 kg
Snatch	161 kg	Hassan Al-Radhi	15 August 2022	Islamic Solidarity Games	Konya, Turkey	
Clean & Jerk	200 kg	Hassan Al-Radhi	15 August 2022	Islamic Solidarity Games	Konya, Turkey	
Total	361 kg	Hassan Al-Radhi	15 August 2022	Islamic Solidarity Games	Konya, Turkey	

=== Women (2018–2025) ===
Event	Record	Athlete	Date	Meet	Place	Ref
45 kg
Snatch	50 kg	Abdulrahman Al-Tassan Ghadah	4 September 2023	World Championships	Riyadh, Saudi Arabia	
Clean & Jerk	61 kg	Abdulrahman Al-Tassan Ghadah	6 October 2022	Asian Championships	Manama, Bahrain	
Total	109 kg	Abdulrahman Al-Tassan Ghadah	4 September 2023	World Championships	Riyadh, Saudi Arabia	
49 kg
Snatch	56 kg	Hanan Khaled Saameri	11 July 2023	Arab Games	Bordj El Kiffan, Algeria	
Clean & Jerk	67 kg	Monerah Al-Rowitea	4 September 2023	World Championships	Riyadh, Saudi Arabia	
Total	119 kg	Monerah Al-Rowitea	4 September 2023	World Championships	Riyadh, Saudi Arabia	
55 kg
Snatch	58 kg	Hanan Aameri	5 September 2023	World Championships	Riyadh, Saudi Arabia	
Clean & Jerk	70 kg	Hanan Aameri	5 September 2023	World Championships	Riyadh, Saudi Arabia	
Total	128 kg	Hanan Aameri	5 September 2023	World Championships	Riyadh, Saudi Arabia	
59 kg
Snatch	70 kg	Alanoud Al-Shehri	10 October 2022	Asian Championships	Manama, Bahrain	
Clean & Jerk	83 kg	Alanoud Al-Shehri	10 October 2022	Asian Championships	Manama, Bahrain	
Total	153 kg	Alanoud Al-Shehri	10 October 2022	Asian Championships	Manama, Bahrain	
64 kg
Snatch	50 kg	Hessa Al-Barrak	9 September 2023	World Championships	Riyadh, Saudi Arabia	
Clean & Jerk	70 kg	Hessa Al-Barrak	9 September 2023	World Championships	Riyadh, Saudi Arabia	
Total	120 kg	Hessa Al-Barrak	9 September 2023	World Championships	Riyadh, Saudi Arabia	
71 kg
Snatch	73 kg	Mada Sulaimani	12 October 2022	Asian Championships	Manama, Bahrain	
Clean & Jerk	95 kg	Mada Sulaimani	12 October 2022	Asian Championships	Manama, Bahrain	
Total	168 kg	Mada Sulaimani	12 October 2022	Asian Championships	Manama, Bahrain	
76 kg
Snatch	55 kg	Layan Al-Qurashi	14 September 2023	World Championships	Riyadh, Saudi Arabia	
Clean & Jerk	73 kg	Layan Al-Qurashi	14 September 2023	World Championships	Riyadh, Saudi Arabia	
Total	128 kg	Layan Al-Qurashi	14 September 2023	World Championships	Riyadh, Saudi Arabia	
81 kg
Snatch	66 kg	Nujud Khormi	14 September 2023	World Championships	Riyadh, Saudi Arabia	
Clean & Jerk	80 kg	Nujud Khormi	14 September 2023	World Championships	Riyadh, Saudi Arabia	
Total	146 kg	Nujud Khormi	14 September 2023	World Championships	Riyadh, Saudi Arabia	
87 kg
Snatch	67 kg	Nujud Khormi	6 October 2023	Asian Games	Hangzhou, China	
Clean & Jerk	87 kg	Nujud Khormi	6 October 2023	Asian Games	Hangzhou, China	
Total	154 kg	Nujud Khormi	6 October 2023	Asian Games	Hangzhou, China	
+87 kg
Snatch	52 kg	Rana Al-Harbi	16 September 2023	World Championships	Riyadh, Saudi Arabia	
Clean & Jerk	74 kg	Rana Al-Harbi	16 September 2023	World Championships	Riyadh, Saudi Arabia	
Total	126 kg	Rana Al-Harbi	16 September 2023	World Championships	Riyadh, Saudi Arabia	
