= 2019 IWF Shengxin World Cup =

Weightlifting tournament

- Location: Tianjin, China
- Dates: 10–13 December 2019
- Competitors: 112

The 2019 Shengxin IWF World Cup in weightlifting was held in Tianjin, China from 10 to 13 December 2019. It was also a qualification event for the 2020 Summer Olympics in Tokyo.

Shi Zhiyong set the new men's -73 kg clean and jerk world record at 198 kg. Deng Wei set the new women's -64 kg snatch world record at 117 kg. Eileen Cikamatana set two new women's -81 kg junior world records in the clean and jerk (150 kg) and the total (260 kg).

== Medal overview ==
=== Men ===
Event		Gold		Silver		Bronze	
– 55 kg	Snatch	Kgotla Kgaswane (BOT)	70 kg				
– 55 kg	Clean & Jerk	Kgotla Kgaswane (BOT)	95 kg				
– 55 kg	Total	Kgotla Kgaswane (BOT)	165 kg				
– 61 kg	Snatch	Li Fabin (CHN)	140 kg	Qin Fulin (CHN)	135 kg	Kao Chan-hung (TPE)	123 kg
– 61 kg	Clean & Jerk	Qin Fulin (CHN)	171 kg	Li Fabin (CHN)	171 kg	Kao Chan-hung (TPE)	155 kg
– 61 kg	Total	Li Fabin (CHN)	311 kg	Qin Fulin (CHN)	306 kg	Kao Chan-hung (TPE)	278 kg
– 67 kg	Snatch	Feng Lüdong (CHN)	151 kg	Chen Lijun (CHN)	150 kg	Mitsunori Konnai (JPN)	140 kg
– 67 kg	Clean & Jerk	Pak Jong-ju (PRK)	175 kg	Mitsunori Konnai (JPN)	175 kg	Feng Lüdong (CHN)	170 kg
– 67 kg	Total	Feng Lüdong (CHN)	321 kg	Chen Lijun (CHN)	320 kg	Pak Jong-ju (PRK)	315 kg
– 73 kg	Snatch	Shi Zhiyong (CHN)	165 kg	Yuan Chengfei (CHN)	154 kg	O Kang-chol (PRK)	149 kg
– 73 kg	Clean & Jerk	Shi Zhiyong (CHN)	198 kg CWR	Masanori Miyamoto (JPN)	187 kg	Yuan Chengfei (CHN)	186 kg
– 73 kg	Total	Shi Zhiyong (CHN)	363 kg	Yuan Chengfei (CHN)	340 kg	Masanori Miyamoto (JPN)	335 kg
– 81 kg	Snatch	Li Dayin (CHN)	171 kg	Lü Xiaojun (CHN)	160 kg	Rejepbaý Rejepow (TKM)	156 kg
– 81 kg	Clean & Jerk	Li Dayin (CHN)	200 kg	Lü Xiaojun (CHN)	190 kg	Rejepbaý Rejepow (TKM)	181 kg
– 81 kg	Total	Li Dayin (CHN)	371 kg	Lü Xiaojun (CHN)	350 kg	Rejepbaý Rejepow (TKM)	337 kg
– 89 kg	Snatch	Yu Dong-ju (KOR)	160 kg	Sarvarbek Zafarjonov (UZB)	156 kg	Toshiki Yamamoto (JPN)	155 kg
– 89 kg	Clean & Jerk	Yu Dong-ju (KOR)	205 kg	Toshiki Yamamoto (JPN)	195 kg	Sarvarbek Zafarjonov (UZB)	190 kg
– 89 kg	Total	Yu Dong-ju (KOR)	365 kg	Toshiki Yamamoto (JPN)	350 kg	Sarvarbek Zafarjonov (UZB)	346 kg
– 96 kg	Snatch	Chen Po-jen (TPE)	175 kg	Tian Tao (CHN)	175 kg	Keydomar Vallenilla (VEN)	166 kg
– 96 kg	Clean & Jerk	Tian Tao (CHN)	225 kg	Han Jung-hoon (KOR)	206 kg	Jang Yeon-hak (KOR)	204 kg
– 96 kg	Total	Tian Tao (CHN)	400 kg	Chen Po-jen (TPE)	375 kg	Jang Yeon-hak (KOR)	369 kg
– 102 kg	Snatch	Jin Yun-seong (KOR)	178 kg				
– 102 kg	Clean & Jerk	Jin Yun-seong (KOR)	210 kg				
– 102 kg	Total	Jin Yun-seong (KOR)	388 kg				
– 109 kg	Snatch	Yang Zhe (CHN)	192 kg	Akbar Djuraev (UZB)	181 kg	Jeong Ki-sam (KOR)	180 kg
– 109 kg	Clean & Jerk	Akbar Djuraev (UZB)	219 kg	Yang Zhe (CHN)	217 kg	Jeong Ki-sam (KOR)	215 kg
– 109 kg	Total	Yang Zhe (CHN)	409 kg	Akbar Djuraev (UZB)	400 kg	Jeong Ki-sam (KOR)	395 kg
+ 109 kg	Snatch	Eishiro Murakami (JPN)	185 kg	Hojamuhammet Toýçyýew (TKM)	183 kg	Raúl Manríquez (MEX)	160 kg
+ 109 kg	Clean & Jerk	Hojamuhammet Toýçyýew (TKM)	231 kg	Eishiro Murakami (JPN)	231 kg	Raúl Manríquez (MEX)	195 kg
+ 109 kg	Total	Eishiro Murakami (JPN)	416 kg	Hojamuhammet Toýçyýew (TKM)	414 kg	Raúl Manríquez (MEX)	355 kg

=== Women ===
Event		Gold		Silver		Bronze	
– 45 kg	Snatch						
– 45 kg	Clean & Jerk						
– 45 kg	Total						
– 49 kg	Snatch	Hou Zhihui (CHN)	94 kg	Jiang Huihua (CHN)	94 kg	Ri Song-gum (PRK)	91 kg
– 49 kg	Clean & Jerk	Ri Song-gum (PRK)	118 kg	Jiang Huihua (CHN)	116 kg	Hou Zhihui (CHN)	110 kg
– 49 kg	Total	Jiang Huihua (CHN)	210 kg	Ri Song-gum (PRK)	209 kg	Hou Zhihui (CHN)	204 kg
– 55 kg	Snatch	Zhang Wanqiong (CHN)	96 kg	Liao Qiuyun (CHN)	95 kg	Muattar Nabieva (UZB)	88 kg
– 55 kg	Clean & Jerk	Zhang Wanqiong (CHN)	116 kg	Liao Qiuyun (CHN)	115 kg	Muattar Nabieva (UZB)	111 kg
– 55 kg	Total	Zhang Wanqiong (CHN)	212 kg	Liao Qiuyun (CHN)	210 kg	Muattar Nabieva (UZB)	199 kg
– 59 kg	Snatch	Choe Hyo-sim (PRK)	104 kg	Chen Guiming (CHN)	103 kg	Li Yajun (CHN)	100 kg
– 59 kg	Clean & Jerk	Chen Guiming (CHN)	138 kg	Choe Hyo-sim (PRK)	138 kg	Li Yajun (CHN)	123 kg
– 59 kg	Total	Choe Hyo-sim (PRK)	242 kg	Chen Guiming (CHN)	241 kg	Li Yajun (CHN)	223 kg
– 64 kg	Snatch	Deng Wei (CHN)	117 kg CWR	Kuo Hsing-chun (TPE)	105 kg	Sarah Davies (GBR)	99 kg
– 64 kg	Clean & Jerk	Kuo Hsing-chun (TPE)	141 kg	Deng Wei (CHN)	138 kg	Quisia Yaneli Guicho Recio (MEX)	122 kg
– 64 kg	Total	Deng Wei (CHN)	255 kg	Kuo Hsing-chun (TPE)	246 kg	Quisia Yaneli Guicho Recio (MEX)	214 kg
– 71 kg	Snatch	Rim Un-sim (PRK)	112 kg	Emily Godley (GBR)	101 kg	Chen Wen-huei (TPE)	90 kg
– 71 kg	Clean & Jerk	Rim Un-sim (PRK)	138 kg	Emily Godley (GBR)	130 kg	Chen Wen-huei (TPE)	123 kg
– 71 kg	Total	Rim Un-sim (PRK)	250 kg	Emily Godley (GBR)	231 kg	Chen Wen-huei (TPE)	213 kg
– 76 kg	Snatch	Rim Jong-sim (PRK)	120 kg	Zhang Wangli (CHN)	115 kg	Kim Su-hyeon (KOR)	107 kg
– 76 kg	Clean & Jerk	Rim Jong-sim (PRK)	150 kg	Zhang Wangli (CHN)	146 kg	Kim Su-hyeon (KOR)	135 kg
– 76 kg	Total	Rim Jong-sim (PRK)	270 kg	Zhang Wangli (CHN)	261 kg	Kim Su-hyeon (KOR)	242 kg
– 81 kg	Snatch	Eileen Cikamatana (AUS)	110 kg	Tursunoy Jabborova (UZB)	100 kg		
– 81 kg	Clean & Jerk	Eileen Cikamatana (AUS)	150 kg JWR	Tursunoy Jabborova (UZB)	120 kg		
– 81 kg	Total	Eileen Cikamatana (AUS)	260 kg JWR	Tursunoy Jabborova (UZB)	220 kg		
– 87 kg	Snatch	Wang Zhouyu (CHN)	126 kg	Kim Un-ju (PRK)	110 kg	Lee Ji-eun (KOR)	107 kg
– 87 kg	Clean & Jerk	Wang Zhouyu (CHN)	155 kg	Kim Un-ju (PRK)	150 kg	Jang Hyeon-ju (KOR)	126 kg
– 87 kg	Total	Wang Zhouyu (CHN)	281 kg	Kim Un-ju (PRK)	260 kg	Lee Ji-eun (KOR)	232 kg
+ 87 kg	Snatch	Li Wenwen (CHN)	138 kg	Kim Kuk-hyang (PRK)	120 kg	Emily Campbell (GBR)	119 kg
+ 87 kg	Clean & Jerk	Li Wenwen (CHN)	177 kg	Son Young-hee (ROK)	158 kg	Kim Kuk-hyang (PRK)	155 kg
+ 87 kg	Total	Li Wenwen (CHN)	315 kg	Kim Kuk-hyang (PRK)	275 kg	Son Young-hee (ROK)	273 kg
