= 2022 World Weightlifting Championships – Men's 61 kg =

The men's 61 kilograms competition at the 2022 World Weightlifting Championships was held on 6 and 7 December 2022.

== Schedule ==
Date	Time	Event
6 December 2022	11:30	Group C
7 December 2022	11:30	Group B
7 December 2022	16:30	Group A

== Medalists ==
Event	Gold		Silver		Bronze	
Snatch	Li Fabin (CHN)	137 kg	He Yueji (CHN)	136 kg	Eko Yuli Irawan (INA)	135 kg
Clean & Jerk	Li Fabin (CHN)	175 kg	Eko Yuli Irawan (INA)	165 kg	Jhon Serna (COL)	164 kg
Total	Li Fabin (CHN)	312 kg	Eko Yuli Irawan (INA)	300 kg	He Yueji (CHN)	296 kg

== Records ==
Prior to this competition, the existing world records were as follows.

World Record	Snatch	Li Fabin (CHN)	145 kg	Pattaya, Thailand	19 September 2019
World Record	Clean & Jerk	Eko Yuli Irawan (INA)	174 kg	Ashgabat, Turkmenistan	3 November 2018
World Record	Total	Li Fabin (CHN)	318 kg	Pattaya, Thailand	19 September 2019

== Results ==
Rank	Athlete	Group	Snatch (kg)				Clean & Jerk (kg)				Total
Rank	Athlete	Group	1	2	3	Rank	1	2	3	Rank	Total
1st place, gold medalist(s)	Li Fabin (CHN)	A	137	~~140~~	~~140~~	1st place, gold medalist(s)	167	~~175~~	175 WR	1st place, gold medalist(s)	312
2nd place, silver medalist(s)	Eko Yuli Irawan (INA)	A	135	~~139~~	~~139~~	3rd place, bronze medalist(s)	165	~~170~~	~~171~~	2nd place, silver medalist(s)	300
3rd place, bronze medalist(s)	He Yueji (CHN)	A	132	136	~~138~~	2nd place, silver medalist(s)	155	160	~~163~~	7	296 JWR
4	Sergio Massidda (ITA)	A	~~130~~	~~133~~	135	4	158	~~162~~	~~164~~	8	293
5	Ricko Saputra (INA)	A	~~128~~	128	132	5	161	~~166~~	~~166~~	5	293
6	Teerapat Chomchuen (THA)	B	125	~~128~~	128	7	155	160	164	4	292
7	Jhon Serna (COL)	B	120	125	~~127~~	10	160	164	~~166~~	3rd place, bronze medalist(s)	289
8	Shota Mishvelidze (GEO)	A	130	~~135~~	~~136~~	6	155	~~165~~	~~165~~	11	285
9	Nguyễn Trần Anh Tuấn (VIE)	A	126	~~129~~	~~131~~	9	155	~~162~~	~~162~~	12	281
10	John Ceniza (PHI)	B	119	122	125	11	155	~~160~~	~~161~~	10	280
11	Arley Calderón (CUB)	B	~~120~~	120	~~123~~	14	155	160	~~162~~	6	280
12	Gabriel Marinov (BUL)	A	121	124	~~126~~	12	155	~~159~~	~~161~~	13	279
13	Goderdzi Berdelidze (GEO)	B	120	124	126	15	144	149	151	18	277
14	Seraj Al-Saleem (KSA)	A	121	~~124~~	~~124~~	13	~~155~~	155	~~160~~	14	276
15	Hampton Morris (USA)	B	~~118~~	118	~~124~~	16	157	~~163~~	~~164~~	9	275
16	Wilkeinner Lugo (VEN)	C	117	~~120~~	123	17	146	151	~~153~~	16	274
17	Ferdi Hardal (TUR)	B	123	~~126~~	~~127~~	18	150	~~154~~	~~154~~	20	273
18	Víctor Güémez (MEX)	B	115	120	~~123~~	19	145	151	~~155~~	17	271
19	Luis Bardalez (PER)	B	113	117	~~120~~	20	150	~~154~~	154	15	271
20	Thiago Silva (BRA)	B	~~120~~	~~120~~	120	21	150	~~154~~	~~154~~	21	270
21	Kazuma Motoki (JPN)	B	~~125~~	125	~~129~~	22	142	~~150~~	~~151~~	26	267
22	Chanambam Rishikanta Singh (IND)	C	113	~~117~~	117	23	143	148	~~151~~	22	265
23	Víctor Garrido (ECU)	C	117	118	~~123~~	24	138	143	~~145~~	25	261
24	Youri Simard (CAN)	C	~~110~~	110	~~114~~	25	140	145	150	19	260
25	Morea Baru (PNG)	C	110	115	~~118~~	26	143	~~148~~	~~150~~	24	258
26	Valentin Iancu (ROU)	C	105	108	~~111~~	27	135	140	144	23	252
27	Tan Chi-chung (TPE)	C	105	~~110~~	110	28	135	140	~~145~~	27	250
28	Yoichi Itokazu (JPN)	C	105	108	110	29	130	134	136	28	246
29	Marian Luca (ROU)	C	105	~~110~~	~~110~~	30	125	130	~~135~~	29	235
30	Davis Niyoyita (UGA)	C	85	90	95	31	120	125	~~127~~	30	220
31	Joshua Amunga (KEN)	C	65	70	73	32	80	84	86	31	159
—	Shin Rok (KOR)	A	~~127~~	~~127~~	127	8	~~156~~	~~156~~	~~159~~	—	—
—	Simon Brandhuber (GER)	A	Did not start								
