= List of Pakistani records in Olympic weightlifting =

The following are the national records in Olympic weightlifting in Pakistan. Records are maintained in each weight class for the snatch lift, clean and jerk lift, and the total for both lifts by the Pakistan Weightlifting Federation.

== Current records ==
=== Men ===
Event	Record	Athlete	Date	Meet	Place	Ref
55 kg
Snatch						
Clean and Jerk						
Total						
61 kg
Snatch	116 kg	Abubakar Ghani	9 December 2021	World Championships	Tashkent, Uzbekistan	
Clean & Jerk	138 kg	Abubakar Ghani	9 December 2021	World Championships	Tashkent, Uzbekistan	
Total	254 kg	Abubakar Ghani	9 December 2021	World Championships	Tashkent, Uzbekistan	
67 kg
Snatch	150 kg	Talha Talib	25 July 2021	Olympic Games	Tokyo, Japan	
Clean & Jerk	170 kg	Talha Talib	25 July 2021	Olympic Games	Tokyo, Japan	
Total	320 kg	Talha Talib	25 July 2021	Olympic Games	Tokyo, Japan	
73 kg
Snatch	128 kg	Sufyan Abu	6 December 2019	South Asian Games	Pokhara, Nepal	
Clean & Jerk	151 kg	Sufyan Abu	6 December 2019	South Asian Games	Pokhara, Nepal	
Total	279 kg	Sufyan Abu	6 December 2019	South Asian Games	Pokhara, Nepal	
81 kg
Snatch	142 kg	Ali Haider	7 December 2019	South Asian Games	Pokhara, Nepal	
Clean and Jerk	176 kg	Ali Haider	7 December 2019	South Asian Games	Pokhara, Nepal	
Total	318 kg	Ali Haider	7 December 2019	South Asian Games	Pokhara, Nepal	
89 kg
Snatch						
Clean and Jerk						
Total						
96 kg
Snatch						
Clean and Jerk						
Total						
102 kg
Snatch	150 kg	Rathore Usman Amjad	7 December 2019	South Asian Games	Pokhara, Nepal	
Clean and Jerk	180 kg	Rathore Usman Amjad	7 December 2019	South Asian Games	Pokhara, Nepal	
Total	330 kg	Rathore Usman Amjad	7 December 2019	South Asian Games	Pokhara, Nepal	
109 kg
Snatch	150 kg	Hanzala Dastgir Butt	8 December 2019	South Asian Games	Pokhara, Nepal	
Clean and Jerk	186 kg	Usman Amjad Rathore	15 October 2022	Asian Championships	Manama, Bahrain	
Total	331 kg	Hanzala Dastgir Butt	8 December 2019	South Asian Games	Pokhara, Nepal	
+109 kg
Snatch	175 kg	Nooh Dastgir Butt	28 April 2019	Asian Championships	Ningbo, China	
Clean and Jerk	232 kg	Nooh Dastgir Butt	3 August 2022	Commonwealth Games	Marston Green, United Kingdom	
Total	405 kg	Nooh Dastgir Butt	3 August 2022	Commonwealth Games	Marston Green, United Kingdom	

=== Women ===
Event	Record	Athlete	Date	Meet	Place	Ref
45 kg
Snatch						
Clean and Jerk						
Total						
49 kg
Snatch	55 kg	Sohail Veronika	5 December 2019	South Asian Games	Pokhara, Nepal	
Clean and Jerk	66 kg	Sohail Veronika	5 December 2019	South Asian Games	Pokhara, Nepal	
Total	121 kg	Sohail Veronika	5 December 2019	South Asian Games	Pokhara, Nepal	
55 kg
Snatch	61 kg	Shazad Saima	5 December 2019	South Asian Games	Pokhara, Nepal	
Clean and Jerk	74 kg	Shazad Saima	5 December 2019	South Asian Games	Pokhara, Nepal	
Total	135 kg	Shazad Saima	5 December 2019	South Asian Games	Pokhara, Nepal	
59 kg
Snatch	62 kg	Ghafoor Saneha	5 December 2019	South Asian Games	Pokhara, Nepal	
Clean & Jerk	81 kg	Ghafoor Saneha	5 December 2019	South Asian Games	Pokhara, Nepal	
Total	143 kg	Ghafoor Saneha	5 December 2019	South Asian Games	Pokhara, Nepal	
64 kg
Snatch	62 kg	Azmat Sonia	6 December 2019	South Asian Games	Pokhara, Nepal	
Clean and Jerk	81 kg	Azmat Sonia	6 December 2019	South Asian Games	Pokhara, Nepal	
Total	143 kg	Azmat Sonia	6 December 2019	South Asian Games	Pokhara, Nepal	
71 kg
Snatch						
Clean and Jerk						
Total						
76 kg
Snatch						
Clean and Jerk						
Total						
81 kg
Snatch						
Clean and Jerk						
Total						
87 kg
Snatch	63 kg	Razzaq Rabbia	7 December 2019	South Asian Games	Pokhara, Nepal	
Clean and Jerk	78 kg	Razzaq Rabbia	7 December 2019	South Asian Games	Pokhara, Nepal	
Total	141 kg	Razzaq Rabbia	7 December 2019	South Asian Games	Pokhara, Nepal	
+87 kg
Snatch						
Clean and Jerk						
Total						
