= Shin Rok =

South Korean weightlifter (born 2002)

Personal information
- Born: 8 July 2002 (age 23)

Sport
- Country: South Korea
- Sport: Weightlifting
- Weight class: 61 kg
Medal record
Men's weightlifting
Representing South Korea
World Championships
Gold medal – first place	2021 Tashkent	61 kg

Shin Rok (Korean: 신록; born 8 July 2002) is a South Korean weightlifter. He won the gold medal in the men's 61 kg event at the 2021 World Weightlifting Championships held in Tashkent, Uzbekistan.

== Career ==
In 2019, Shin won the silver medal in the men's 61 kg event at the Asian Youth Championships held in Pyongyang, North Korea.

In 2021, he won the bronze medal in the snatch in the men's 61 kg event at the Junior World Weightlifting Championships held in Tashkent, Uzbekistan.

== Achievements ==
Year	Venue	Weight	Snatch (kg)				Clean & Jerk (kg)				Total	Rank
Year	Venue	Weight	1	2	3	Rank	1	2	3	Rank	Total	Rank
World Championships
2021	Tashkent, Uzbekistan	61 kg	127	130	132	1st place, gold medalist(s)	~~156~~	156	~~164~~	1st place, gold medalist(s)	288	1st place, gold medalist(s)
2022	Bogotá, Colombia	61 kg	~~127~~	~~127~~	127	8	~~156~~	~~156~~	~~159~~	—	—	—
2023	Riyadh, Saudi Arabia	61 kg	120	125	~~130~~	16	150	~~155~~	155	18	280	16
