= 2024 World Weightlifting Championships – Men's 61 kg =

Men's 61 kg at the 2024 World Weightlifting Championships
- Venue: Weightlifting Marquee Venue
- Location: Manama, Bahrain
- Dates: 7 December
- Competitors: 17 from 16 nations
- Winning total: 305 kg

Medalists
gold medal	Pak Myong-jin	North Korea
silver medal	Aniq Kasdan	Malaysia
bronze medal	Nguyễn Trần Anh Tuấn	Vietnam

The men's 61 kilograms competition at the 2024 World Weightlifting Championships was held on 7 December 2024.

== Schedule ==
Date	Time	Event
7 December 2024	15:00	Group B
7 December 2024	20:00	Group A

== Records ==
Prior to this competition, the existing world records were as follows.

World record	Snatch	Li Fabin (CHN)	146 kg	Phuket, Thailand	2 April 2024
World record	Clean & Jerk	Hampton Morris (USA)	176 kg	Phuket, Thailand	2 April 2024
World record	Total	Li Fabin (CHN)	318 kg	Pattaya, Thailand	19 September 2019

== Results ==
Rank	Athlete	Group	Snatch (kg)				Clean & Jerk (kg)				Total
Rank	Athlete	Group	1	2	3	Rank	1	2	3	Rank	Total
1st place, gold medalist(s)	Pak Myong-jin (PRK)	A	129	~~132~~	132	1st place, gold medalist(s)	165	169	173	1st place, gold medalist(s)	305
2nd place, silver medalist(s)	Aniq Kasdan (MAS)	A	125	~~130~~	130	4	~~165~~	166	~~172~~	2nd place, silver medalist(s)	296
3rd place, bronze medalist(s)	Nguyễn Trần Anh Tuấn (VIE)	A	~~128~~	129	131	2nd place, silver medalist(s)	156	160	~~163~~	4	291
4	Wei Haixian (CHN)	A	128	~~131~~	~~132~~	5	160	~~166~~	~~167~~	3rd place, bronze medalist(s)	288
5	Kao Chan-hung (TPE)	A	122	125	~~127~~	9	151	156	158	5	283
6	Goderdzi Berdelidze (GEO)	A	125	~~130~~	~~131~~	8	145	152	157	6	282
7	Garnik Cholakyan (ARM)	B	120	125	130	3rd place, bronze medalist(s)	150	~~155~~	~~155~~	7	280
8	Hashem Al-Khadrawi (KSA)	B	111	115	118	11	138	142	144	8	262
9	Pavlo Zalipskyi (UKR)	B	~~120~~	120	~~123~~	10	138	141	~~144~~	9	261
10	Deniz Danev (BUL)	B	100	105	~~110~~	13	130	135	140	10	245
11	Mohammad bin Haji Abu Bakar (BRU)	B	98	101	104	14	~~128~~	128	~~132~~	12	232
12	Ricardo Mendonça (POR)	B	~~95~~	95	~~100~~	15	~~115~~	118	~~130~~	13	213
13	Fahad Al-Otaibi (KUW)	B	88	~~93~~	~~93~~	16	~~117~~	117	~~123~~	14	205
—	Ricko Saputra (INA)	A	~~127~~	127	~~131~~	6	~~157~~	~~157~~	~~160~~	—	—
—	Trịnh Văn Vinh (VIE)	A	~~123~~	123	126	7	~~161~~	~~161~~	~~161~~	—	—
—	Arley Calderón (CUB)	A	116	~~121~~	~~121~~	12	~~158~~	~~158~~	~~158~~	—	—
—	Lee Hye-seong (KOR)	A	~~127~~	~~129~~	~~130~~	—	140	—	—	11	—
—	Lamin Kamara (SLE)	B	Did not start								
—	Elsayed Aly (EGY)	B	Did not start								
—	Morea Baru (PNG)	B	Did not start								
