= 2018 World Weightlifting Championships – Men's 61 kg =

The men's 61 kg competition at the 2018 World Weightlifting Championships was held on 1–3 November 2018.

== Schedule ==
| Date | Time | Event |
|---|---|---|
| 1 November 2018 | 19:00 | Group C |
| 2 November 2018 | 14:25 | Group B |
| 3 November 2018 | 17:25 | Group A |

== Medalists ==
| Event | Gold | | Silver | | Bronze | |
|---|---|---|---|---|---|---|
| Snatch | Eko Yuli Irawan (INA) | 143 kg | Li Fabin (CHN) | 142 kg | Qin Fulin (CHN) | 139 kg |
| Clean & Jerk | Eko Yuli Irawan (INA) | 174 kg | Qin Fulin (CHN) | 169 kg | Francisco Mosquera (COL) | 169 kg |
| Total | Eko Yuli Irawan (INA) | 317 kg | Li Fabin (CHN) | 310 kg | Qin Fulin (CHN) | 308 kg |

== Records ==
Prior to this competition, the existing world records were as follows.

| World Record | Snatch | World Standard | 144 kg | — | 1 November 2018 |
| World Record | Clean & Jerk | World Standard | 173 kg | — | 1 November 2018 |
| World Record | Total | World Standard | 312 kg | — | 1 November 2018 |

== Results ==
| Rank | Athlete | Group | Snatch (kg) | | | | Clean & Jerk (kg) | | | | Total |
| Rank | Athlete | Group | 1 | 2 | 3 | Rank | 1 | 2 | 3 | Rank | Total |
|---|---|---|---|---|---|---|---|---|---|---|---|
| 1st place, gold medalist(s) | Eko Yuli Irawan (INA) | A | 137 | 141 | 143 | 1st place, gold medalist(s) | 165 | 170 | 174 | 1st place, gold medalist(s) | 317 |
| 2nd place, silver medalist(s) | Li Fabin (CHN) | A | 133 | 138 | 142 | 2nd place, silver medalist(s) | 160 | 165 | 168 | 4 | 310 |
| 3rd place, bronze medalist(s) | Qin Fulin (CHN) | A | ~~135~~ | 135 | 139 | 3rd place, bronze medalist(s) | 165 | 169 | ~~172~~ | 2nd place, silver medalist(s) | 308 |
| 4 | Francisco Mosquera (COL) | A | 130 | 135 | ~~137~~ | 6 | ~~167~~ | 169 | ~~172~~ | 3rd place, bronze medalist(s) | 304 |
| 5 | Thạch Kim Tuấn (VIE) | A | 135 | ~~139~~ | ~~139~~ | 5 | ~~163~~ | 163 | ~~167~~ | 6 | 298 |
| 6 | Adkhamjon Ergashev (UZB) | A | ~~132~~ | 133 | 136 | 4 | 157 | ~~160~~ | ~~166~~ | 10 | 293 |
| 7 | Shota Mishvelidze (GEO) | A | 130 | 135 | ~~139~~ | 7 | ~~155~~ | ~~155~~ | 158 | 9 | 293 |
| 8 | Yoichi Itokazu (JPN) | B | 125 | 129 | 132 | 9 | 155 | 160 | ~~162~~ | 8 | 292 |
| 9 | Antonio Vázquez (MEX) | A | ~~120~~ | ~~120~~ | 120 | 19 | 166 | ~~169~~ | ~~170~~ | 5 | 286 |
| 10 | Henadz Laptseu (BLR) | A | 128 | ~~132~~ | 132 | 10 | ~~151~~ | ~~151~~ | 151 | 16 | 283 |
| 11 | Han Myeong-mok (KOR) | B | 132 | ~~136~~ | ~~136~~ | 8 | 150 | ~~155~~ | ~~155~~ | 18 | 282 |
| 12 | Cristhian Zurita (ECU) | B | 125 | ~~130~~ | 130 | 11 | 147 | 151 | ~~153~~ | 15 | 281 |
| 13 | Nestor Colonia (PHI) | B | 120 | ~~125~~ | ~~125~~ | 16 | 153 | 160 | ~~162~~ | 7 | 280 |
| 14 | Surahmat Wijoyo (INA) | B | 117 | 121 | 124 | 13 | ~~150~~ | 150 | 154 | 11 | 278 |
| 15 | Kao Chan-hung (TPE) | B | 120 | 123 | ~~126~~ | 14 | 147 | 150 | 153 | 13 | 276 |
| 16 | Bünyamin Sezer (TUR) | A | 129 | ~~134~~ | ~~136~~ | 12 | ~~145~~ | ~~145~~ | 145 | 20 | 274 |
| 17 | Luis García (DOM) | B | ~~120~~ | 120 | ~~124~~ | 18 | 153 | ~~157~~ | ~~157~~ | 12 | 273 |
| 18 | Hiroaki Takao (JPN) | C | 118 | 122 | ~~125~~ | 15 | 147 | ~~150~~ | 150 | 17 | 272 |
| 19 | José Montes (MEX) | B | 117 | 120 | ~~123~~ | 17 | 152 | ~~155~~ | ~~155~~ | 14 | 272 |
| 20 | Davide Ruiu (ITA) | B | 113 | 117 | ~~120~~ | 21 | 144 | ~~147~~ | ~~147~~ | 23 | 261 |
| 21 | Patiphan Bupphamala (THA) | C | 113 | ~~117~~ | 117 | 20 | 135 | 140 | 143 | 24 | 260 |
| 22 | Wilkeinner Lugo (VEN) | B | 115 | ~~118~~ | ~~121~~ | 23 | ~~145~~ | 145 | ~~150~~ | 19 | 260 |
| 23 | Mahammad Mammadli (AZE) | C | 112 | 116 | ~~120~~ | 22 | 139 | 142 | ~~145~~ | 25 | 258 |
| 24 | Jon Luke Mau (GER) | C | ~~108~~ | 108 | 112 | 24 | 138 | 141 | 144 | 22 | 256 |
| 25 | Julio Acosta (CHI) | C | 111 | ~~115~~ | ~~115~~ | 26 | 140 | 144 | ~~147~~ | 21 | 255 |
| 26 | Chiang Nien-en (TPE) | C | 108 | ~~112~~ | 112 | 25 | ~~140~~ | ~~140~~ | 140 | 26 | 252 |
| — | Ferdi Hardal (TUR) | B | ~~120~~ | ~~120~~ | ~~120~~ | — | ~~140~~ | ~~140~~ | 140 | 27 | — |

== New records ==
| Clean & Jerk | 174 kg | Eko Yuli Irawan (INA) | WR |
| Total | 313 kg | Eko Yuli Irawan (INA) | WR |
| Total | 317 kg | Eko Yuli Irawan (INA) | WR |
