= 2019 World Weightlifting Championships – Men's 61 kg =

The men's 61 kg competition at the 2019 World Weightlifting Championships was held on 18 and 19 September 2019.

== Schedule ==
Date	Time	Event
18 September 2019	22:30	Group C
19 September 2019	14:25	Group B
19 September 2019	20:25	Group A

== Medalists ==
Event	Gold		Silver		Bronze	
Snatch	Li Fabin (CHN)	145 kg	Eko Yuli Irawan (INA)	140 kg	Yoichi Itokazu (JPN)	135 kg
Clean & Jerk	Li Fabin (CHN)	173 kg	Francisco Mosquera (COL)	172 kg	Qin Fulin (CHN)	171 kg
Total	Li Fabin (CHN)	318 kg	Eko Yuli Irawan (INA)	306 kg	Francisco Mosquera (COL)	302 kg

== Records ==
Prior to this competition, the existing world records were as follows.

World Record	Snatch	World Standard	144 kg	—	1 November 2018
World Record	Clean & Jerk	Eko Yuli Irawan (INA)	174 kg	Ashgabat, Turkmenistan	3 November 2018
World Record	Total	Eko Yuli Irawan (INA)	317 kg	Ashgabat, Turkmenistan	3 November 2018

== Results ==
Rank	Athlete	Group	Snatch (kg)				Clean & Jerk (kg)				Total
Rank	Athlete	Group	1	2	3	Rank	1	2	3	Rank	Total
1st place, gold medalist(s)	Li Fabin (CHN)	A	138	141	145	1st place, gold medalist(s)	168	173	~~175~~	1st place, gold medalist(s)	318
2nd place, silver medalist(s)	Eko Yuli Irawan (INA)	A	~~136~~	136	140	2nd place, silver medalist(s)	~~166~~	166	~~175~~	4	306
3rd place, bronze medalist(s)	Francisco Mosquera (COL)	A	130	~~135~~	~~135~~	6	167	~~172~~	172	2nd place, silver medalist(s)	302
4	Thạch Kim Tuấn (VIE)	A	133	~~136~~	~~136~~	5	163	~~167~~	~~167~~	6	296
5	Jhon Serna (COL)	A	125	130	~~132~~	7	165	~~170~~	~~170~~	5	295
6	Yoichi Itokazu (JPN)	A	131	135	~~137~~	3rd place, bronze medalist(s)	~~158~~	158	~~162~~	10	293
7	Shota Mishvelidze (GEO)	A	130	~~135~~	135	4	152	~~160~~	~~163~~	16	287
8	Aznil Bidin (MAS)	B	~~125~~	125	~~128~~	12	~~160~~	160	~~163~~	7	285
9	Kao Chan-hung (TPE)	B	125	~~128~~	~~128~~	10	155	158	~~160~~	9	283
10	Jon Luke Mau (GER)	B	115	119	122	18	153	158	~~162~~	8	280
11	Ferdi Hardal (TUR)	A	125	~~129~~	~~130~~	13	154	~~159~~	~~159~~	14	279
12	Goderdzi Berdelidze (GEO)	B	123	~~126~~	126	8	142	147	151	17	277
13	Mirco Scarantino (ITA)	B	121	~~124~~	124	15	150	153	~~156~~	15	277
14	Seraj Al-Saleem (KSA)	B	118	123	~~125~~	16	147	~~154~~	154	13	277
15	Luis García (DOM)	A	~~121~~	121	~~124~~	19	~~156~~	~~156~~	156	12	277
16	Morea Baru (PNG)	B	120	~~124~~	~~124~~	20	~~156~~	156	~~160~~	11	276
17	Cristhian Zurita (ECU)	B	124	~~128~~	~~128~~	14	146	~~150~~	150	19	274
18	Hayato Hirai (JPN)	B	118	122	~~124~~	17	145	149	~~151~~	20	271
19	Seýitjan Mirzaýew (TKM)	B	~~125~~	125	~~129~~	11	~~145~~	145	~~150~~	24	270
20	Tan Chi-chung (TPE)	C	~~115~~	115	~~118~~	22	~~145~~	145	148	21	263
21	Chaturanga Lakmal (SRI)	C	~~117~~	117	~~120~~	21	145	~~150~~	~~150~~	23	262
22	Arley Calderón (CUB)	C	~~114~~	~~114~~	114	24	~~146~~	~~146~~	146	22	260
23	José Montes (MEX)	C	~~110~~	110	115	23	133	~~137~~	137	25	252
24	Elson Brechtefeld (NRU)	C	95	100	105	26	130	135	~~140~~	26	240
—	Josué Brachi (ESP)	C	125	~~128~~	~~128~~	9	~~145~~	~~145~~	~~145~~	—	—
—	Marcos Rojas (PER)	C	107	~~110~~	~~110~~	25	~~143~~	~~143~~	~~143~~	—	—
—	Qin Fulin (CHN)	A	~~136~~	~~136~~	~~138~~	—	166	171	~~175~~	3rd place, bronze medalist(s)	—
—	Éric Andriantsitohaina (MAD)	C	~~110~~	~~110~~	~~110~~	—	145	150	~~155~~	18	—
—	Hurşit Atak (TUR)	A	~~122~~	~~122~~	~~122~~	—	~~155~~	~~155~~	~~155~~	—	—
—	Thilanka Palangasinghe (SRI)	B	~~117~~	~~117~~	~~117~~	—	—	—	—	—	—

== New records ==
Snatch	145 kg	Li Fabin (CHN)	WR
Total	318 kg	Li Fabin (CHN)	WR
