= Seraj Al-Saleem =

Saudi Arabian weightlifter (born 1996)

Personal information
- Born: 10 February 1996 (age 30)

Sport
- Country: Saudi Arabia
- Sport: Weightlifting
- Weight class: 61 kg
Medal record
Men's weightlifting
Representing Saudi Arabia
World Championships
Bronze medal – third place	2021 Tashkent	61 kg
Asian Championships
Silver medal – second place	2020 Tashkent	61 kg
Islamic Solidarity Games
Silver medal – second place	2021 Konya	61 kg S
Silver medal – second place	2021 Konya	61 kg C
Silver medal – second place	2021 Konya	61 kg T
Bronze medal – third place	2025 Riyadh	65 kg C
Bronze medal – third place	2025 Riyadh	65 kg T

Seraj Al-Saleem (Arabic: سراج آل سليم; born 10 February 1996) is a Saudi Arabian weightlifter. He won the bronze medal in the men's 61 kg event at the 2021 World Weightlifting Championships held in Tashkent, Uzbekistan. He also won the silver medal in the men's 61 kg event at the 2020 Asian Weightlifting Championships, also held in Tashkent, Uzbekistan.

He represented Saudi Arabia at the 2020 Summer Olympics in Tokyo, Japan. He finished in 5th place in the men's 61 kg event.

== Career ==
In 2014, he competed in the men's 56 kg event at the World Weightlifting Championships held in Almaty, Kazakhstan. He also competed at the 2017 World Weightlifting Championships in Anaheim, United States and the 2019 World Weightlifting Championships in Pattaya, Thailand.

He competed in the men's 56 kg event at the 2017 Asian Indoor and Martial Arts Games held in Ashgabat, Turkmenistan. He also represented Saudi Arabia in the men's 56 kg event at the 2018 Asian Games held in Jakarta, Indonesia.

He won the silver medal in his event at the 2021 Islamic Solidarity Games held in Konya, Turkey. He competed in the men's 61 kg event at the 2022 World Weightlifting Championships held in Bogotá, Colombia.

== Achievements ==
Year	Venue	Weight	Snatch (kg)				Clean & Jerk (kg)				Total	Rank
Year	Venue	Weight	1	2	3	Rank	1	2	3	Rank	Total	Rank
Summer Olympics
2021	Tokyo, Japan	61 kg	124	127	129	—N/a	159	~~166~~	~~166~~	—N/a	288	5
World Championships
2014	Almaty, Kazakhstan	56 kg	94	98	101	29	119	~~123~~	~~124~~	30	220	29
2017	Anaheim, United States	56 kg	108	~~112~~	112	6	138	~~143~~	~~143~~	6	250	6
2019	Pattaya, Thailand	61 kg	118	123	~~125~~	16	147	~~154~~	154	13	277	14
2021	Tashkent, Uzbekistan	61 kg	123	127	~~130~~	4	~~155~~	155	~~162~~	3rd place, bronze medalist(s)	282	3rd place, bronze medalist(s)
2022	Bogotá, Colombia	61 kg	121	~~124~~	~~124~~	13	~~155~~	155	~~160~~	14	276	14
2023	Riyadh, Saudi Arabia	67 kg	~~121~~	121	125	13	~~155~~	158	~~165~~	14	283	11
2024	Manama, Bahrain	67 kg	131	135	~~138~~	10	162	169	~~172~~	8	304	8
2026	Ningbo, China	65 kg	—	—	—	—	—	—	—	—	—	—
Asian Games
2018	Jakarta, Indonesia	56 kg	~~108~~	~~108~~	108	—N/a	137	141	~~144~~	—N/a	249	8
2023	Hangzhou, China	61 kg	124	128	130	—N/a	156	~~162~~	~~162~~	—N/a	286	8
2026	Nagoya, Japan	65 kg	~~131~~	131	~~135~~	—N/a	~~167~~	167	~~173~~	—N/a	298	5
