= Jung A-ram =

South Korean weightlifter (born 1998)

Personal information
- Born: 10 November 1998 (age 27)

Sport
- Country: South Korea
- Sport: Weightlifting
- Weight class: 87 kg
Medal record
Women's weightlifting
Representing South Korea
World Championships
Bronze medal – third place	2023 Riyadh	87 kg
Asian Games
Bronze medal – third place	2022 Hangzhou	87 kg

Jung A-ram (born 10 November 1998) is a South Korean weightlifter. She won the bronze medal in the women's 87 kg event at the 2023 World Weightlifting Championships held in Riyadh, Saudi Arabia. She also won the bronze medal in the women's 87 kg event at the 2022 Asian Games held in Hangzhou, China.

== Achievements ==
Year	Venue	Weight	Snatch (kg)				Clean & jerk (kg)				Total	Rank
Year	Venue	Weight	1	2	3	Rank	1	2	3	Rank	Total	Rank
World Championships
2023	Riyadh, Saudi Arabia	87 kg	~~103~~	103	107	2nd place, silver medalist(s)	~~134~~	134	~~139~~	3rd place, bronze medalist(s)	241	3rd place, bronze medalist(s)
