= Yeinny Geles =

Colombian weightlifter (born 1997)

Personal information
- Full name: Yeinny Norela Geles Moreno
- Born: 6 December 1997 (age 28) Turbo, Colombia

Sport
- Country: Colombia
- Sport: Weightlifting
- Weight class: 81 kg; 86 kg; 87 kg; +87 kg
Medal record
Representing Colombia
Women's weightlifting
World Championships
Silver medal – second place	2023 Riyadh	87 kg
Pan American Championships
Silver medal – second place	2022 Bogotá	87 kg
Bronze medal – third place	2021 Guayaquil	87 kg
Central American and Caribbean Games
Gold medal – first place	2026 Santo Domingo	86 kg S
Silver medal – second place	2023 San Salvador	87 kg S
Silver medal – second place	2026 Santo Domingo	86 kg CJ
South American Games
Bronze medal – third place	2022 Asunción	+87 kg
Bolivarian Games
Gold medal – first place	2025 Lima-Ayacucho	86 kg S
Silver medal – second place	2022 Valledupar	87 kg S
Silver medal – second place	2025 Lima-Ayacucho	86 kg CJ
Bronze medal – third place	2022 Valledupar	87 kg CJ

Yeinny Norela Geles Moreno (born 6 December 1997) is a Colombian weightlifter. She won the silver medal in the women's 87 kg event at the 2023 World Weightlifting Championships held in Riyadh, Saudi Arabia. She is a two-time medalist at the Pan American Weightlifting Championships. She won two medals at the 2022 Bolivarian Games held in Valledupar, Colombia.

Geles competed in the girls' +63 kg event at the 2014 Summer Youth Olympics held in Nanjing, China.

She won the bronze medal in her event at the 2022 South American Games held in Asunción, Paraguay.

== Achievements ==
Year	Venue	Weight	Snatch (kg)				Clean & Jerk (kg)				Total	Rank
Year	Venue	Weight	1	2	3	Rank	1	2	3	Rank	Total	Rank
Representing Colombia
World Championships
2022	Bogotá, Colombia	87 kg	~~107~~	~~109~~	~~109~~	—	130	135	~~139~~	4	—	—
2023	Riyadh, Saudi Arabia	87 kg	~~106~~	~~106~~	106	4	130	134	138	2nd place, silver medalist(s)	244	2nd place, silver medalist(s)
2024	Manama, Bahrain	81 kg	103	~~106~~	~~106~~	9	~~130~~	~~130~~	130	11	233	8
Pan American Championships
2020	Santo Domingo, Dominican Republic	87 kg	~~105~~	105	108	5	123	127	131	4	239	4
2021	Guayaquil, Ecuador	87 kg	~~105~~	105	~~110~~	2nd place, silver medalist(s)	125	132	~~135~~	3rd place, bronze medalist(s)	237	3rd place, bronze medalist(s)
2022	Bogotá, Colombia	87 kg	106	109	111	1st place, gold medalist(s)	131	135	138	2nd place, silver medalist(s)	249	2nd place, silver medalist(s)
Central American and Caribbean Games
2023	San Salvador, El Salvador	87 kg	105	~~108~~	~~108~~	2nd place, silver medalist(s)	127	134	~~137~~	4	—N/a	—N/a
2026	Santo Domingo, Dominican Republic	86 kg	105	110	115	1st place, gold medalist(s)	131	~~141~~	~~141~~	2nd place, silver medalist(s)	—N/a	—N/a
South American Games
2022	Asunción, Paraguay	+87 kg	105	110	~~113~~	—N/a	130	~~135~~	136	—N/a	246	3rd place, bronze medalist(s)
Bolivarian Games
2022	Valledupar, Colombia	87 kg	106	~~110~~	~~111~~	2nd place, silver medalist(s)	130	~~135~~	~~135~~	3rd place, bronze medalist(s)	—N/a	—N/a
2025	Lima, Peru	86 kg	106	109	111	1st place, gold medalist(s)	~~130~~	130	~~139~~	2nd place, silver medalist(s)	—N/a	—N/a
