= Chinese Taipei Weightlifting Association =

Weightlifting Association in Taiwan

- 中華民國舉重協會
- Sport: Olympic weightlifting
- Jurisdiction: Taiwan
- Abbreviation: CTWA
- Founded: 1962; 64 years ago
- Affiliation: International Weightlifting Federation
- Regional affiliation: Asian Weightlifting Federation
- Headquarters: Zhongshan District, Taipei

The Chinese Taipei Weightlifting Association (CTWA; Chinese: 中華民國舉重協會) is the organization representing the sport of Olympic weightlifting in the Republic of China (Taiwan), also known as Chinese Taipei.

== History ==
It was established in 1962, and is a member of both the Asian Weightlifting Federation and the International Weightlifting Federation. In 2019, IWF General Secretary Mohammed Hasan Jalood visited Taiwan and met CTWA President Chang Yang Po-Lien.

== See also ==
- Taiwanese records in Olympic weightlifting
- List of world records in Olympic weightlifting
- Chinese Taipei at the Olympics
- Asian Weightlifting Championships
