= 2021 World Weightlifting Championships – Men's 61 kg =

Weightlifting Championship

The men's 61 kilograms competition at the 2021 World Weightlifting Championships was held on 9 December 2021.

== Schedule ==
Date	Time	Event
9 December 2021	10:30	Group B
9 December 2021	19:00	Group A

== Medalists ==
Event	Gold		Silver		Bronze	
Snatch	Shin Rok (KOR)	132 kg	Shota Mishvelidze (GEO)	131 kg	Seýitjan Mirzaýew (TKM)	128 kg
Clean & Jerk	Shin Rok (KOR)	156 kg	Shota Mishvelidze (GEO)	155 kg	Seraj Al-Saleem (KSA)	155 kg
Total	Shin Rok (KOR)	288 kg	Shota Mishvelidze (GEO)	286 kg	Seraj Al-Saleem (KSA)	282 kg

== Records ==
Prior to this competition, the existing world records were as follows.

World Record	Snatch	Li Fabin (CHN)	145 kg	Pattaya, Thailand	19 September 2019
World Record	Clean & Jerk	Eko Yuli Irawan (INA)	174 kg	Ashgabat, Turkmenistan	3 November 2018
World Record	Total	Li Fabin (CHN)	318 kg	Pattaya, Thailand	19 September 2019

== Results ==
Rank	Athlete	Group	Snatch (kg)				Clean & Jerk (kg)				Total
Rank	Athlete	Group	1	2	3	Rank	1	2	3	Rank	Total
1st place, gold medalist(s)	Shin Rok (KOR)	A	127	130	132	1st place, gold medalist(s)	~~156~~	156	~~164~~	1st place, gold medalist(s)	288
2nd place, silver medalist(s)	Shota Mishvelidze (GEO)	A	126	~~126~~	131	2nd place, silver medalist(s)	150	155	~~160~~	2nd place, silver medalist(s)	286
3rd place, bronze medalist(s)	Seraj Al-Saleem (KSA)	A	123	127	~~130~~	4	~~155~~	155	~~162~~	3rd place, bronze medalist(s)	282
4	Habib de las Salas (COL)	A	119	~~124~~	124	6	150	~~154~~	~~154~~	8	274
5	Aznil Bidin (MAS)	A	~~120~~	120	~~125~~	8	~~149~~	149	153	5	273
6	Muhammad Faathir (INA)	A	112	~~117~~	118	9	146	153	~~157~~	4	271
7	Ramini Shamilishvili (GEO)	A	117	120	122	7	141	145	~~148~~	10	267
8	John Ceniza (PHI)	B	115	~~118~~	~~118~~	14	145	148	150	7	265
9	Gururaja Poojary (IND)	A	117	~~120~~	~~120~~	10	148	~~153~~	~~153~~	9	265
10	Thilanka Palangasinghe (SRI)	A	112	116	~~118~~	13	~~145~~	145	~~148~~	11	261
11	Pasit Saengma (THA)	A	~~110~~	~~110~~	110	15	151	~~154~~	~~154~~	6	261
12	Chaturanga Lakmal (SRI)	B	110	113	116	11	140	142	~~144~~	13	258
13	Abubakar Ghani (PAK)	B	111	~~116~~	116	12	138	~~142~~	~~143~~	14	254
—	Seýitjan Mirzaýew (TKM)	A	~~128~~	128	~~132~~	3rd place, bronze medalist(s)	~~145~~	~~145~~	~~147~~	—	—
—	Kazuma Motoki (JPN)	A	~~125~~	~~125~~	125	5	~~142~~	~~142~~	~~142~~	—	—
—	Emmanuel Appah (NGR)	B	~~115~~	~~115~~	~~115~~	—	139	142	~~145~~	12	—
