= Aniq Kasdan =

Malaysian weightlifter (born 2002)

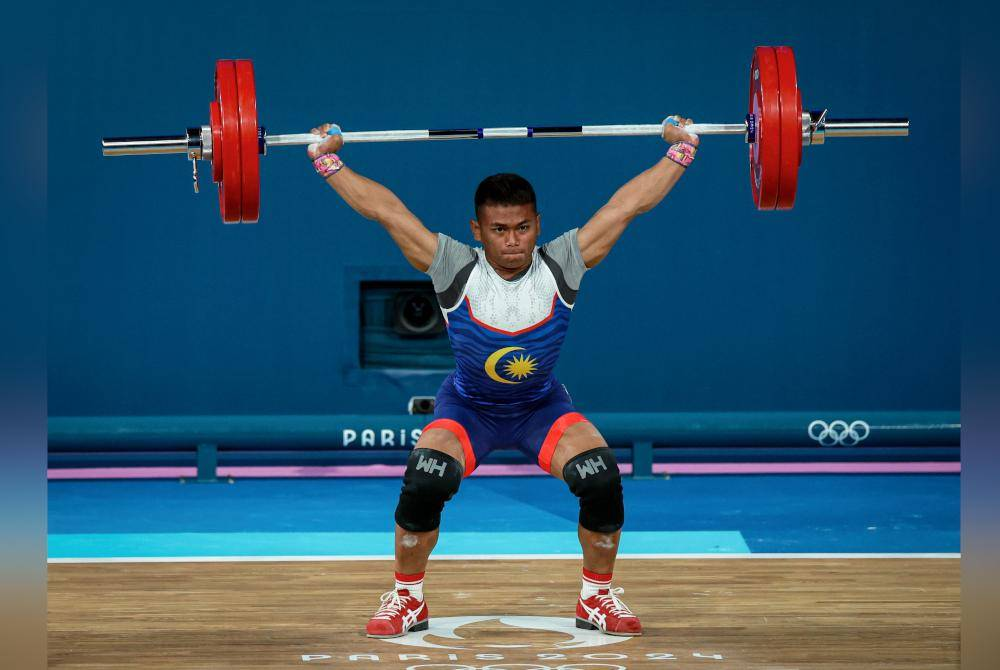
- Mohamad Aniq during the 2024 Summer Olympics

Personal information
- Full name: Mohamad Aniq bin Kasdan
- Nickname: Aniq
- Nationality: Malaysian
- Born: 16 June 2002 (age 24) Segamat, Johor, Malaysia

Sport
- Country: Malaysia
- Sport: Weightlifting
- Event: 55 kg
- Coached by: Yon Haryono; Nur Jannah Batrisyah
Medal record
Men's weightlifting
Representing Malaysia
World Championships
Silver medal – second place	2024 Manama	61 kg
Asian Championships
Silver medal – second place	2026 Gandhinagar	60 kg
IWF Grand Prix
Bronze medal – third place	2023 Qatar	61 kg
Commonwealth Games
Gold medal – first place	2022 Birmingham	55 kg
Gold medal – first place	2026 Glasgow	60 kg
Commonwealth Championships
Gold medal – first place	2021 Tashkent	55 kg
Southeast Asian Games
Bronze medal – third place	2021 Hanoi	55 kg

Mohamad Aniq bin Kasdan (born 16 June 2002) is a Malaysian weightlifter. He won the silver medal in the Clean & Jerk men's 55 kg event at the 2021 World Weightlifting Championships held in Tashkent, Uzbekistan. He was the first Malaysian weightlifter to win a medal in the World Weightlifting Championships.

== Career ==
In 2021, Aniq won a gold medal at the Commonwealth Weightlifting Championships in Tashkent, Uzbekistan. He also won a bronze medal at the 2021 Southeast Asian Games in Hanoi. In 2022, Aniq participated in the Commonwealth Games weightlifting 55 kg category. He set a new Games record of 142 kg in Clean & Jerk, won Malaysia's first medal and first gold medal in the Games.

In August 2024, Aniq competed in the men's 61 kg event at the 2024 Summer Olympics held in Paris, France. He finished in fourth place with 297 kg in total. He failed his last two Clean and Jerk attempts to lift 174 kg in pursuit for silver medal and missed out on podium by 1 kg.

Competing for his second time in Glasgow for the 2026 Commonwealth Games, Aniq participated in the weightlifting 60 kg category, lifting a whopping 152 kg in the Clean & Jerk category, as well as 121 kg in the snatch, to win a gold medal for his Clean & Jerk lift, alongside being a new game record in his category.

== Major results ==
Year	Venue	Weight	Snatch (kg)				Clean & Jerk (kg)				Total	Rank
Year	Venue	Weight	1	2	3	Rank	1	2	3	Rank	Total	Rank
Olympic Games
2024	Paris, France	61 kg	126	~~130~~	130	—N/a	167	~~174~~	~~174~~	—N/a	297	4
World Championships
2021	Tashkent, Uzbekistan	55 kg	103	107	~~112~~	11	135	~~140~~	142	2nd place, silver medalist(s)	249	5
2023	Riyadh, Saudi Arabia	61 kg	122	125	~~127~~	18	160	166	~~167~~	3rd place, bronze medalist(s)	291	9
2024	Manama, Bahrain	61 kg	125	~~130~~	130	4	~~165~~	166	~~172~~	2nd place, silver medalist(s)	296	2nd place, silver medalist(s)
2025	Førde, Norway	60 kg	115	~~120~~	~~120~~	16	146	151	~~155~~	11	266	13
IWF World Cup
2024	Phuket, Thailand	61 kg	~~125~~	~~125~~	125	14	~~165~~	165	~~172~~	6	290	8
Commonwealth Games
2022	Birmingham, England	55 kg	107	~~111~~	~~111~~	—N/a	138	~~142~~	142	—N/a	249	1st place, gold medalist(s)
2026	Glasgow, Scotland	60 kg	116	119	121	—N/a	145	149	152	—N/a	273	1st place, gold medalist(s)
Asian Championships
2022	Manama, Bahrain	61 kg	108	113	~~117~~	10	143	150	160	2nd place, silver medalist(s)	273	4
2023	Jinju, South Korea	61 kg	114	119	122	6	151	158	162	8	284	6
2026	Ghandinagar, India	60 kg	120	122	~~125~~	2nd place, silver medalist(s)	~~155~~	~~155~~	155	2nd place, silver medalist(s)	277	2nd place, silver medalist(s)
