= Shota Mishvelidze =

Georgian weightlifter (born 1994)

Personal information
- Nationality: Georgian
- Born: 18 October 1994 (age 31) Kutaisi, Georgia
- Weight: 60.98 kg (134 lb)

Sport
- Country: Georgia
- Sport: Weightlifting
- Event: 61 kg
Medal record
Men's weightlifting
Representing Georgia
World Championships
Silver medal – second place	2021 Tashkent	61 kg
Bronze medal – third place	2017 Anaheim	62 kg
European Championships
Gold medal – first place	2018 Bucharest	62 kg
Gold medal – first place	2023 Yerevan	61 kg
Silver medal – second place	2021 Moscow	61 kg
Silver medal – second place	2022 Tirana	67 kg
Bronze medal – third place	2024 Sofia	61 kg

Shota Mishvelidze (Georgian: შოთა მიშველიძე; born 18 October 1994) is a Georgian male weightlifter, and European Champion competing in the 62 kg category until 2018 and 61 kg starting in 2018 after the International Weightlifting Federation reorganized the categories.

== Career ==
=== Olympic Games ===
Mishvelidze competed at two Olympics Games. In 2021, he represented Georgia in 61 kg category at the 2020 Summer Olympics in Tokyo, Japan. He had one successful attempt in Snatch and Clean & Jerk and finished seventh with 285 kg in total.

In August 2024, Mishvelidze again competed in the men's 61 kg event at the 2024 Summer Olympics held in Paris, France. He lifted 256 kg in total which was enough for a sixth-place finish.

=== World Championships ===
He competed at the 2017 World Weightlifting Championships in the 62 kg division, winning a bronze medal in the total. The competition was close as he was only 1 kg from the silver medalist Yoichi Itokazu and 2 kg from the gold medalist Francisco Mosquera.

In 2021, he won the silver medal in the men's 61 kg event at the 2021 World Weightlifting Championships held in Tashkent, Uzbekistan.

=== European Championships ===
Mishvelidze competed at the men's 62 kg event at the 2018 European Weightlifting Championships in Bucharest, Romania, winning a silver medal in the snatch portion competition (134 kg), a gold medal in the clean and jerk portion (165 kg) and a gold medal for the total with (299 kg).

== Major results ==
Year	Venue	Weight	Snatch (kg)				Clean & Jerk (kg)				Total	Rank
Year	Venue	Weight	1	2	3	Rank	1	2	3	Rank	Total	Rank
Summer Olympics
2021	Tokyo, Japan	61 kg	130	~~134~~	~~135~~	—N/a	155	~~163~~	~~165~~	—N/a	285	7
2024	Paris, France	61 kg	114	121	~~128~~	—N/a	125	135	~~150~~	—N/a	256	6
World Championships
2015	Houston, United States	69 kg	134	138	140	18	160	~~165~~	~~165~~	33	300	26
2017	Anaheim, United States	62 kg	~~130~~	130	135	4	148	157	163	5	298	3rd place, bronze medalist(s)
2018	Ashgabat, Turkmenistan	61 kg	130	135	~~139~~	7	~~155~~	~~155~~	158	9	293	7
2019	Pattaya, Thailand	61 kg	130	~~135~~	135	4	152	~~160~~	~~163~~	16	287	7
2021	Tashkent, Uzbekistan	61 kg	126	~~126~~	131	2nd place, silver medalist(s)	150	155	~~160~~	2nd place, silver medalist(s)	286	2nd place, silver medalist(s)
2022	Bogotá, Colombia	61 kg	130	~~135~~	~~136~~	6	155	~~165~~	~~163~~	11	285	8
2023	Riyadh, Saudi Arabia	61 kg	132	~~136~~	136	3rd place, bronze medalist(s)	156	~~161~~	161	13	297	4
IWF World Cup
2020	Roma, Italy	61 kg	123	128	131	2nd place, silver medalist(s)	145	151	155	2nd place, silver medalist(s)	286	2nd place, silver medalist(s)
2024	Phuket, Thailand	61 kg	~~130~~	~~130~~	130	8	152	~~160~~	~~160~~	14	282	12
European Championships
2018	Bucharest, Romania	62 kg	129	~~133~~	134	2nd place, silver medalist(s)	152	158	165	1st place, gold medalist(s)	299	1st place, gold medalist(s)
2019	(Georgia (country)) Batumi, Georgia	61 kg	125	~~129~~	~~129~~	4	~~147~~	149	156	1st place, gold medalist(s)	281	4
2021	Moscow, Russia	61 kg	~~129~~	131	135	2nd place, silver medalist(s)	155	~~159~~	~~162~~	5	290	2nd place, silver medalist(s)
2022	Tirana, Albania	67 kg	135	139	142	1st place, gold medalist(s)	~~164~~	~~165~~	165	3rd place, bronze medalist(s)	307	2nd place, silver medalist(s)
2023	Yerevan, Armenia	61 kg	129	133	136	1st place, gold medalist(s)	~~154~~	155	162	2nd place, silver medalist(s)	298	1st place, gold medalist(s)
