= Weightlifting at the 2026 Commonwealth Games – Men's 60 kg =

Weightlifting – Men's 60 kg at the 2026 Commonwealth Games
- Venue: Scottish Event Campus
- Dates: 26 July 2026
- Competitors: 11 from 11 nations

Medalists
gold medal	Aniq Kasdan	Malaysia
silver medal	Rishikanta Chanambam	India
bronze medal	Joshua Amunga Mboya	Kenya

The Men's 60 kg weightlifting event at the 2026 Commonwealth Games will take place at the SEC Armadillo, Glasgow on 26 July 2026. Malaysia's Aniq Kasdan won the gold medal ahead of Rishikanta Chanambam from India who took silver with Joshua Amunga Mboya of Kenya claiming the bronze.

== Qualification ==
A total of 176 weightlifters (88 per gender) qualify to compete at the Games. Nations may earn one quota per weight class, allocated as follows:

- Automatic Qualification – Host CGA (1 per event)
- Direct Qualification – 2025 Commonwealth Weightlifting Champions (1 per event)
- IWF Commonwealth Ranking List (Ranking Period: 01 June 2025 – 18 May 2026) (8 per event)
- Bipartite Invitation (1 per event)

The following lifters qualified in the Men's 60 kg class:

Means of qualification	Quotas	Qualified
Host Nation	~~1~~ 0*	~~TBD (SCO)~~
2025 Commonwealth Championships	1	Rishikanta Singh (IND)
IWF Commonwealth Rankings	~~8~~ 9	Aniq Kasdan (MAS); Supun Dilhara Somathilaka (SRI); Antonin Lanoue (CAN); Joshua Amunga (KEN); Johannes Adam (NRU); Davis Niyoyita (UGA); Reinataake Takenteiti (KIR); Kieran Stiles (ENG); Hafiz Bin Zaidi (SGP)
Bipartite Invitation	1	Kevau Baru (PNG)
TOTAL	11	

* Hosts Scotland declined their automatic entry in this weight class.

== Schedule ==
All times are British Summer Time (UTC+1)

Date	Time	Round
26 July 2026	09:00	Final

== Competition ==
The lightest weight class at the 2026 Games, the 60 kg limit is 5 kg heavier than the corresponding class at the 2022 Commonwealth Games, (and is only 1 kg lighter than the second class in Birmingham, the 61 kg class). The gold medalist from the 55 kg event in Birmingham, Malaysia's Aniq Kasdan, returned to 'defend' his title at the new lowest weight, and was successful, breaking the Games record in the clean and jerk and total categories.

Rank	Athlete	Body weight (kg)	Snatch (kg)				Clean & Jerk (kg)				Total
Rank	Athlete	Body weight (kg)	1	2	3	Result	1	2	3	Result	Total
1st place, gold medalist(s)	Aniq Kasdan (MAS)		116	119	121	121	145	149	152	152 GR	273 GR
2nd place, silver medalist(s)	Rishikanta Singh (IND)		116	119	121	121 GR	143	~~148~~	~~151~~	143	264
3rd place, bronze medalist(s)	Joshua Amunga Mboya (KEN)		108	110	115	115	136	140	145	145	260
4	Supun Dilhara Somathilaka (SRI)		~~105~~	105	109	109	135	~~144~~	~~152~~	135	244
5	Antonin Lanoue (CAN)		101	~~105~~	~~105~~	101	~~132~~	132	~~137~~	132	233
6	Kevau Baru (PNG)		90	95	98	98	121	~~126~~	127	127	225
7	Kieran Stiles (ENG)		95	~~98~~	~~98~~	95	118	123	126	126	221
8	Hafiz Bin Zaidi (SGP)		100	~~103~~	~~105~~	100	110	117	~~125~~	117	217
9	Davis Niyoyita (UGA)		~~105~~	~~105~~	105	105	~~135~~	~~135~~	~~135~~	-	NM
10	Johannes Adam (NRU)		~~100~~	~~100~~	100	100	~~130~~	-	-	-	NM
-	Reinataake Takenteiti (KIR)		85	~~90~~	~~90~~	85	-	-	-	-	DNF
