= Kao Chan-hung =

Taiwanese weightlifter (born 1993)

Personal information
- Nationality: Taiwanese
- Born: October 3, 1993 (age 33) Taoyuan District, Kaohsiung
- Height: 1.60 m (5 ft 3 in)
- Weight: 60.80 kg (134 lb)

Sport
- Country: Chinese Taipei
- Sport: Weightlifting
- Event: –61 kg

Kao Chan-hung (Chinese: 高 展宏, born 3 October 1993) is a Taiwanese Olympic weightlifter and current national record holder.

== Career ==
He made his debut appearance at the Asian Games representing Chinese Taipei at the 2018 Asian Games and competed in the men's 62kg event. In April 2021, he set the new Taiwanese record in men's snatch event during the 2020 Asian Weightlifting Championships.

He represented Chinese Taipei at the 2020 Summer Olympics which was also his debut appearance at the Olympics and competed in the men's 61kg event.

== Achievements ==
Year	Venue	Weight	Snatch (kg)				Clean & Jerk (kg)				Total	Rank
Year	Venue	Weight	1	2	3	Rank	1	2	3	Rank	Total	Rank
Summer Olympics
2021	Tokyo, Japan	61 kg	125	~~128~~	~~130~~	–	~~147~~	~~147~~	~~147~~	–	–	–
World Championships
2014	Almaty, Kazakhstan	62 kg	115	~~120~~	120	18	135	140	145	20	265	19
2015	Houston, United States	62 kg	120	124	126	16	142	147	150	26	276	22
2017	Anaheim, United States	62 kg	125	~~130~~	130	7	150	155	~~160~~	9	285	9
2018	Ashgabat, Turkmenistan	61 kg	120	123	~~126~~	14	147	150	153	13	276	15
2019	Pattaya, Thailand	61 kg	125	~~128~~	~~128~~	10	155	158	~~160~~	9	283	9
2023	Riyadh, Saudi Arabia	61 kg	122	125	~~127~~	17	~~151~~	151	154	19	279	18
2024	Manama, Bahrain	61 kg	122	125	~~127~~	9	151	156	158	5	283	5
2026	Ningbo, China	65 kg	115	118	~~120~~	27	140	~~145~~	145	27	263	25
Asian Games
2018	Jakarta, Indonesia	62 kg	~~126~~	126	~~129~~	—	~~153~~	154	~~157~~	—	280	9
2023	Hangzhou, China	61 kg	118	121	124	—	147	151	~~154~~	—	275	9
Asian Championships
2021	Tashkent, Uzbekistan	61 kg	125	~~129~~	129	5	~~154~~	~~154~~	~~154~~	—	—	—
