= Weightlifting at the 2020 Summer Olympics – Men's 61 kg =

Men's 61 kg at the Games of the XXXII Olympiad
- Venue: Tokyo International Forum
- Date: 25 July 2021
- Competitors: 14 from 14 nations
- Winning total: 313 kg OR

Medalists
1st place, gold medalist(s)		Li Fabin	China
2nd place, silver medalist(s)		Eko Yuli Irawan	Indonesia
3rd place, bronze medalist(s)		Igor Son	Kazakhstan

The men's 61 kg weightlifting competitions at the 2020 Summer Olympics in Tokyo took place on 25 July at the Tokyo International Forum.

Li Fabin from China, Eko Yuli Irawan from Indonesia and Igor Son from Kazakhstan won the gold, silver and bronze medals, respectively. Dominican Luis García, German Simon Brandhuber, Papua New Guinean Morea Baru, Malagasy Eric Andriantsitohaina, and Peruvian Marcos Rojas earning their spots in total lifting.

== Records ==
{{{caption}}}
World Record	Snatch	Li Fabin (CHN)	145 kg	Pattaya, Thailand	19 September 2019
World Record	Clean & Jerk	Eko Yuli Irawan (INA)	174 kg	Ashgabat, Turkmenistan	3 November 2018
World Record	Total	Li Fabin (CHN)	318 kg	Pattaya, Thailand	19 September 2019
Olympic Record	Snatch	Olympic Standard	142 kg	—	1 November 2018
Olympic Record	Clean & Jerk	Olympic Standard	171 kg	—	1 November 2018
Olympic Record	Total	Olympic Standard	310 kg	—	1 November 2018

== Results ==
Rank	Athlete	Nation	Group	Body weight	Snatch (kg)				Clean & Jerk (kg)				Total
Rank	Athlete	Nation	Group	Body weight	1	2	3	Result	1	2	3	Result	Total
1st place, gold medalist(s)	Li Fabin	China	A	60.90	~~137~~	137	141	141	166	172	~~178~~	172 OR	313 OR
2nd place, silver medalist(s)	Eko Yuli Irawan	Indonesia	A	60.80	137	~~141~~	~~141~~	137	165	~~177~~	~~177~~	165	302
3rd place, bronze medalist(s)	Igor Son	Kazakhstan	A	60.25	126	131	~~134~~	131	156	~~162~~	163	163	294
4	Yoichi Itokazu	Japan	A	60.85	~~130~~	130	133	133	~~158~~	159	~~162~~	159	292
5	Seraj Al-Saleem	Saudi Arabia	A	60.90	124	127	129	129	159	~~166~~	~~166~~	159	288
6	Davide Ruiu	Italy	A	60.90	123	127	~~131~~	127	153	~~159~~	159	159	286
7	Shota Mishvelidze	Georgia	A	60.95	130	~~134~~	~~135~~	130	155	~~163~~	~~165~~	155	285
8	Luis García	Dominican Republic	B	60.95	~~120~~	120	~~124~~	120	~~154~~	~~154~~	154	154	274
9	Simon Brandhuber	Germany	B	61.00	123	~~127~~	~~127~~	123	~~142~~	142	145	145	268
10	Morea Baru	Papua New Guinea	B	61.00	113	~~118~~	118	118	147	~~153~~	~~153~~	147	265
11	Eric Andriantsitohaina	Madagascar	B	60.10	105	110	114	114	140	150	~~154~~	150	264
12	Marcos Rojas	Peru	B	60.90	100	105	~~107~~	105	~~130~~	130	135	135	240
–	Thạch Kim Tuấn	Vietnam	A	60.80	~~126~~	126	~~130~~	126	~~150~~	~~150~~	~~153~~	–	–
–	Kao Chan-hung	Chinese Taipei	A	60.70	125	~~128~~	~~130~~	125	~~147~~	~~147~~	~~147~~	–	–

== New records ==
Clean and Jerk	172 kg	Li Fabin (CHN)	OR
Total	313 kg	Li Fabin (CHN)	OR
