= Weightlifting at the 2022 Asian Games – Women's 87 kg =

Women's 87 kg at the 2022 Asian Games
- Venue: Xiaoshan Sports Center Gymnasium
- Date: 6 October 2023
- Competitors: 11 from 9 nations

Medalists
gold medal	Liang Xiaomei	China
silver medal	Yun Ha-je	South Korea
bronze medal	Jung A-ram	South Korea

The women's 87 kilograms competition at the 2022 Asian Games took place on 6 October 2023 at Xiaoshan Sports Center Gymnasium.

== Schedule ==
All times are China Standard Time (UTC+08:00)

Date	Time	Event
Friday, 6 October 2023	19:00	Group A

== Records ==
Prior to this competition, the existing world, Asian and Games records were as follows.

World Record	Snatch	World Standard	132 kg	—	1 November 2018
World Record	Clean & Jerk	World Standard	164 kg	—	1 November 2018
World Record	Total	World Standard	294 kg	—	1 November 2018
Asian Record	Snatch	Asian Standard	130 kg	—	1 November 2018
Asian Record	Clean & Jerk	Asian Standard	162 kg	—	1 November 2018
Asian Record	Total	Asian Standard	289 kg	—	1 November 2018
Games Record	Snatch	Asian Games Standard	128 kg	—	1 November 2018
Games Record	Clean & Jerk	Asian Games Standard	162 kg	—	1 November 2018
Games Record	Total	Asian Games Standard	287 kg	—	1 November 2018

== Results ==
Legend

- NM — No mark

Rank	Athlete	Group	Snatch (kg)				Clean & Jerk (kg)				Total
Rank	Athlete	Group	1	2	3	Result	1	2	3	Result	Total
1st place, gold medalist(s)	Liang Xiaomei (CHN)	A	110	115	120	120	140	148	155	155	275
2nd place, silver medalist(s)	Yun Ha-je (KOR)	A	103	107	~~109~~	107	136	140	145	145	252
3rd place, bronze medalist(s)	Jung A-ram (KOR)	A	102	106	~~109~~	106	~~134~~	134	139	139	245
4	Rigina Adashbaeva (UZB)	A	100	~~104~~	106	106	~~125~~	127	~~132~~	127	233
5	Anamjan Rustamowa (TKM)	A	~~98~~	~~101~~	102	102	122	126	~~128~~	126	228
6	Motoka Nakajima (JPN)	A	97	100	~~102~~	100	123	~~126~~	~~129~~	123	223
7	Wakana Nagashima (JPN)	A	95	100	~~103~~	100	120	~~125~~	~~125~~	120	220
8	Nujud Khormi (KSA)	A	63	67	~~70~~	67	80	~~85~~	87	87	154
—	Mönkhjantsangiin Ankhtsetseg (MGL)	A	103	107	~~109~~	107	~~134~~	~~136~~	~~138~~	—	NM
—	Lo Ying-yuan (TPE)	A	108	~~111~~	~~111~~	108	~~132~~	~~133~~	~~135~~	—	NM
—	Elham Hosseini (IRI)	A	~~95~~	95	~~100~~	95	—	—	—	—	NM
