= 2023 World Weightlifting Championships – Women's 87 kg =

The women's 87 kilograms competition at the 2023 World Weightlifting Championships was held on 15 September 2023.

== Schedule ==
Date	Time	Event
15 September 2023	14:30	Group B
15 September 2023	19:00	Group A

== Medalists ==
Event	Gold		Silver		Bronze	
Snatch	Lo Ying-yuan (TPE)	112 kg	Jung A-ram (KOR)	107 kg	Anastasiia Manievska (UKR)	106 kg
Clean & Jerk	Solfrid Koanda (NOR)	156 kg	Yeinny Geles (COL)	138 kg	Jung A-ram (KOR)	134 kg
Total	Lo Ying-yuan (TPE)	245 kg	Yeinny Geles (COL)	244 kg	Jung A-ram (KOR)	241 kg

== Records ==
Prior to this competition, the existing world records were as follows.

World Record	Snatch	World Standard	132 kg	—	1 November 2018
World Record	Clean & Jerk	World Standard	164 kg	—	1 November 2018
World Record	Total	World Standard	294 kg	—	1 November 2018

== Results ==
Rank	Athlete	Group	Snatch (kg)				Clean & Jerk (kg)				Total
Rank	Athlete	Group	1	2	3	Rank	1	2	3	Rank	Total
1st place, gold medalist(s)	Lo Ying-yuan (TPE)	A	108	110	112	1st place, gold medalist(s)	128	~~133~~	133	5	245
2nd place, silver medalist(s)	Yeinny Geles (COL)	A	~~106~~	~~106~~	106	4	130	134	138	2nd place, silver medalist(s)	244
3rd place, bronze medalist(s)	Jung A-ram (KOR)	A	~~103~~	103	107	2nd place, silver medalist(s)	~~134~~	134	~~139~~	3rd place, bronze medalist(s)	241
4	María Fernanda Valdés (CHI)	A	~~105~~	105	~~108~~	8	130	133	~~135~~	4	238
5	Tatev Hakobyan (ARM)	A	~~105~~	105	~~108~~	6	128	132	~~136~~	6	237
6	Hripsime Khurshudyan (ARM)	A	~~105~~	105	~~108~~	7	~~130~~	130	~~134~~	8	235
7	Rigina Adashbaeva (UZB)	A	101	~~104~~	~~106~~	10	123	~~128~~	131	7	232
8	Monique Lima Araújo (WRT)	B	~~100~~	100	105	5	116	121	126	9	231
9	Anne Vejsgaard Jensen (DEN)	A	100	~~105~~	105	9	~~118~~	118	~~122~~	11	223
10	Nikola Seničova (SVK)	B	93	97	~~101~~	11	114	119	123	10	220
11	Veronika Mitykó (HUN)	B	~~94~~	~~94~~	94	12	106	111	114	12	208
12	Lenka Žembová (SVK)	B	90	~~93~~	~~93~~	13	109	112	~~115~~	13	202
13	Ajah Pritchard-Lolo (VAN)	B	85	~~90~~	~~90~~	14	105	~~110~~	111	14	196
14	Eliška Šmigová (CZE)	B	~~83~~	83	~~86~~	15	103	107	110	15	193
—	Solfrid Koanda (NOR)	A	~~115~~	~~115~~	~~115~~	—	140	150	156	1st place, gold medalist(s)	—
—	Anastasiia Manievska (UKR)	A	106	~~108~~	~~108~~	3rd place, bronze medalist(s)	—	—	—	—	—
—	Jéssica da Silva (POR)	B	~~88~~	—	—	—	—	—	—	—	—
—	Zeinab Sheikh (IRI)	B	Did not start								
