= Rishikanta Singh Chanambam =

Indian weightlifter (born 1998)

Rishikanta Singh
Personal information
- Full name: Rishikanta Singh Chanambam
- Born: 5 July 1998 (age 28) Ngairangbam Makha Maning Leikai, Manipur, India
- Military career
- Branch: Indian Navy
- Service years: 2019–present
- Rank: Chief petty officer

Sport
- Sport: Weightlifting
- Weight class: 60 kg
Medal record
Men's weightlifting
Representing India
Commonwealth Games
Silver medal – second place	2026 Glasgow	60kg
Commonwealth Championships
Gold medal – first place	2019 Apia	55kg
Gold medal – first place	2025 Ahmedabad	60kg
Commonwealth Junior Championships
Bronze medal – third place	2016 Penang	56kg

Rishikanta Singh Chanambam (born 5 July 1998) is an Indian weightlifter. He won the silver medal in the men's 60 kg category at the 2026 Commonwealth Games. He competed at the 2025 Commonwealth Weightlifting Championships, winning the gold medal in the men's 60 kg event. He also competed at the 2026 Commonwealth Games, winning the silver medal in the same event.

== Early life ==
Rishikanta Singh Chanambam was born on 5 July 1998 in Ngairangbam Makha Maning Leikai in Imphal West district of Manipur. He worked as a manual labourer as a teenager. He started training in weightlifting at the Sports Academy at Khuman Lampak Main Stadium complex in Imphal. He later trained at the Army Sports Institute in Pune, the Netaji Subhas National Institute of Sports in Patiala, and the National Sports Academy "Vasil Levski" in Bulgaria.

== Career ==
Rishikanta Singh won a bronze medal in the junior category in the 2016 Commonwealth Weightlifting Championships in Penang. He lifted a total weight of 226 kg (498 lb) to finish third in the 56 kg category. In the 2019 Commonwealth Weightlifting Championships, he won the gold medal in the 55 kg weight category with a total lift of 235 kg (518 lb) including 105 kg (231 lb) in snatch and 130 kg (290 lb) in clean & jerk. This victory earned him a job of chief petty officer in the Indian Navy. He finished sixth in the 61 kg weight category in the 2022 Asian Weightlifting Championships at Manama. He registered a total lift of 120 kg (260 lb) with 151 kg (333 lb) in snatch and 271 kg (597 lb) in clean & jerk.

Rishikanta Singh set a new national record of 124 kg (273 lb) in snatch in the 61 kg category at the 2024 National Weightlifting Championships. At the 2025 Commonwealth Weightlifting Championships in Ahmedabad, he won the gold medal in the 60 kg category with a total lift of 271 kg (597 lb). He was part of the Indian contingent for the 2026 Commonwealth Games held in Glasgow. In the 60 kg event, he won the silver medal with a total lift of 271 kg (597 lb). In snatch, he cleared 116 kg (256 lb) and 119 kg (262 lb) in his first two attempts respectively, before setting a Commonwealth Games record with a lift of 121 kg (267 lb) in his third and final attempt. In clean & jerk, while he cleared 143 kg (315 lb) in his first attempt, he failed to lift 148 kg (326 lb) and 151 kg (333 lb) in his next two attempts.
