= Simon Brandhuber =

German weightlifter (born 1991)

Personal information
- Born: 27 June 1991 (age 35)

Sport
- Country: Germany
- Sport: Weightlifting
- Weight class: 61 kg; 67 kg
Medal record
Men's weightlifting
Representing Germany
European Championships
Silver medal – second place	2019 Batumi	67 kg
Silver medal – second place	2022 Tirana	61 kg
IWF World Cup
Silver medal – second place	2020 Rome	67 kg

Simon Josef Brandhuber (born 27 June 1991) is a German weightlifter. He is a two-time silver medalist at the European Weightlifting Championships.

At the 2019 European Weightlifting Championships held in Batumi, Georgia, he won the silver medal in the men's 67 kg event.

In 2020, Brandhuber won the silver medal in the men's 67 kg event at the Roma 2020 World Cup in Rome, Italy. He competed in the men's 61 kg event at the 2020 Summer Olympics in Tokyo, Japan.

Brandhuber won the silver medal in the men's 61 kg event at the 2022 European Weightlifting Championships held in Tirana, Albania.
