= Lo Ying-yuan =

Taiwanese weightlifter (born 1996)

Personal information
- Born: 7 May 1996 (age 30)

Sport
- Country: Chinese Taipei
- Sport: Weightlifting
- Weight class: 87 kg
Medal record
Women's weightlifting
Representing Chinese Taipei
World Championships
Gold medal – first place	2023 Riyadh	87 kg
Asian Championships
Gold medal – first place	2023 Jinju	87 kg
Silver medal – second place	2017 Ashgabat	90 kg
Silver medal – second place	2022 Manama	87 kg
Bronze medal – third place	2025 Jiangshan	87 kg
Summer Universiade
Bronze medal – third place	2017 New Taipei	90 kg

Lo Ying-yuan (Chinese: 羅楹湲; born 7 May 1996) is a Taiwanese weightlifter. She won the gold medal in the women's 87 kg event at the 2023 World Weightlifting Championships held in Riyadh, Saudi Arabia. She is also a three-time medalist, including gold, at the Asian Weightlifting Championships.

In 2017, she won the bronze medal in the women's 90 kg event at the Summer Universiade held in New Taipei, Taiwan.

She competed in the women's 87 kg event at the 2022 Asian Games held in Hangzhou, China.

== Achievements ==
Year	Venue	Weight	Snatch (kg)				Clean & Jerk (kg)				Total	Rank
Year	Venue	Weight	1	2	3	Rank	1	2	3	Rank	Total	Rank
World Championships
2023	Riyadh, Saudi Arabia	87 kg	108	110	112	1st place, gold medalist(s)	128	~~133~~	133	5	245	1st place, gold medalist(s)
