= Qin Fulin =

Chinese weightlifter (born 1994)

Personal information
- Nationality: Chinese
- Born: 12 January 1994 (age 32)
- Weight: 60.83 kg (134 lb)

Sport
- Country: China
- Sport: Weightlifting
- Event: –61 kg
Medal record
Representing China
World Championships
Bronze medal – third place	2018 Ashgabat	–61 kg

Qin Fulin (born 12 January 1994) is a Chinese weightlifter.

He participated at the 2018 World Weightlifting Championships in Ashgabat, Turkmenistan, winning the bronze medal.
