= Chen Po-jen =

Taiwanese weightlifter (born 1998)

Personal information
- Born: 11 May 1998 (age 28)

Sport
- Country: Taiwan
- Sport: Weightlifting
Medal record
Representing Chinese Taipei
Asian Championships
Silver medal – second place	2022 Manama	96 kg
Bronze medal – third place	2024 Tashkent	102 kg

Chen Po-jen (Chinese: 陳柏任, born 11 May 1998) is a Taiwanese weightlifter. He represented Chinese Taipei at the 2020 Summer Olympics in Tokyo, Japan. He competed in the men's 96 kg event.

In 2018, he represented Chinese Taipei at the Asian Games held in Jakarta, Indonesia in the men's 94 kg event.

In 2021, he competed at the 2020 Asian Weightlifting Championships held in Tashkent, Uzbekistan.

He won the silver medal in his event at the 2022 Asian Weightlifting Championships held in Manama, Bahrain.
