= 2023 World Weightlifting Championships =

2023 World Championships
- Host city: Riyadh, Saudi Arabia
- Dates: 4–17 September
- Main venue: Prince Faisal bin Fahd Olympic Complex (Green Hall)

The 2023 World Weightlifting Championships was a weightlifting competition held in Riyadh, Saudi Arabia from 4 to 17 September 2023.

The event served as a mandatory event to qualify for the 2024 Summer Olympics in Paris, France. The competition was previously expected to be held using two platforms instead of one.

== Schedule ==
Men's events
Date →	Mon 4		Tue 5		Wed 6		Thu 7		Fri 8	Sat 9			Sun 10				Mon 11				Tue 12	Wed 13				Thu 14		Sat 16		Sun 17			
Event ↓	16:30	21:30	11:30	19:00	11:30	16:30	16:00	19:00	14:00	11:30	16:30	19:00	09:00	11:30	14:00	21:30	11:30	14:00	16:30	19:00	20:30	09:00	14:00	16:30	21:30	11:30	19:00	14:00	19:00	09:00	11:30	14:00	16:30
55 kg	B			A																													
61 kg		D	C		B	A																											
67 kg							B	A																									
73 kg									D	C	B	A																					
81 kg															C		B		A														
89 kg													E	D		C		B		A													
96 kg																					C		B	A									
102 kg																						D			C	B	A						
109 kg																												B	A				
+109 kg																														D	C	B	A

Women's events
Date →	Mon 4			Tue 5			Wed 6		Thu 7			Fri 8		Sat 9		Sun 10		Mon 11		Tue 12	Wed 13		Thu 14				Fri 15				Sat 16		
Event ↓	11:30	14:00	19:00	14:00	16:30	21:30	14:00	19:00	09:30	11:30	13:30	16:30	19:00	09:00	14:00	16:30	19:00	09:00	21:30	18:30	11:30	19:00	09:00	14:00	16:30	21:30	11:30	14:30	16:30	19:00	09:30	11:30	16:30
45 kg			A																														
49 kg	D	C		B	A																												
55 kg						C	B	A																									
59 kg									E	D	C	B	A																				
64 kg														D	C	B	A																
71 kg																		E	D	C	B	A											
76 kg																							C	B	A								
81 kg																										C	B		A				
87 kg																												B		A			
+87 kg																															C	B	A

== Medal table ==
Ranking by Big (Total result) medals

Rank	Nation	Gold	Silver	Bronze	Total
1	China	7	4	2	13
2	Thailand	2	0	1	3
3	Chinese Taipei	2	0	0	2
3	Egypt	2	0	0	2
5	Colombia	1	3	0	4
6	South Korea	1	2	2	5
7	Uzbekistan	1	1	1	3
8	Italy	1	1	0	2
8	Vietnam	1	1	0	2
10	Georgia	1	0	0	1
10	Iran	1	0	0	1
12	Indonesia	0	2	0	2
13	Ecuador	0	1	2	3
13	United States	0	1	2	3
15	Armenia	0	1	1	2
16	Madagascar	0	1	0	1
16	Nigeria	0	1	0	1
16	Ukraine	0	1	0	1
19	Turkey	0	0	2	2
20	Australia	0	0	1	1
20	Azerbaijan	0	0	1	1
20	Bahrain	0	0	1	1
20	Iraq	0	0	1	1
20	Mexico	0	0	1	1
20	Venezuela	0	0	1	1
–	Individual Neutral Athletes (Note: As a result of sanctions imposed following the 2022 Russian invasion of Ukraine, Belarusian weightlifters participated as Individual Neutral Athletes (Athlètes Individuels Neutres in French) according to an IOC decision implemented by the IWF. No Russian athlete agreed to participate as neutrals. No flag at all was used for the delegation, not even the IWF flag. The IWF does not include the medals won by these weightlifters in the official medal table, they results does not counted in the team rankings.)	0	0	1	1
Totals (25 entries)		20	20	20	60

Ranking by all medals: Big (Total result) and Small (Snatch and Clean & Jerk)

Rank	Nation	Gold	Silver	Bronze	Total
1	China	20	10	3	33
2	Thailand	5	1	3	9
3	Egypt	5	1	1	7
4	Chinese Taipei	5	1	0	6
5	South Korea	4	7	7	18
6	Uzbekistan	4	2	1	7
7	Vietnam	3	3	0	6
8	Georgia	3	0	1	4
9	Colombia	2	9	3	14
10	Iran	2	0	1	3
11	Armenia	1	3	4	8
11	United States	1	3	4	8
13	Indonesia	1	3	0	4
13	Italy	1	3	0	4
15	Iraq	1	0	1	2
–	Individual Neutral Athletes	1	0	1	2
16	Norway	1	0	0	1
17	Madagascar	0	3	0	3
18	Ecuador	0	2	7	9
19	Ukraine	0	2	2	4
20	Nigeria	0	2	1	3
21	Bulgaria	0	2	0	2
22	Bahrain	0	1	1	2
23	Moldova	0	1	0	1
23	Qatar	0	1	0	1
25	Turkey	0	0	5	5
26	Azerbaijan	0	0	3	3
26	Venezuela	0	0	3	3
28	Australia	0	0	2	2
28	Mexico	0	0	2	2
30	Latvia	0	0	1	1
30	Malaysia	0	0	1	1
30	Romania	0	0	1	1
30	Turkmenistan	0	0	1	1
Totals (33 entries)		60	60	60	180

== Medal summary ==
=== Men ===
Event	Gold		Silver		Bronze	
55 kg
Snatch	Lại Gia Thành; Vietnam	123 kg	Ngô Sơn Đỉnh; Vietnam	117 kg	Thada Somboon-uan; Thailand	116 kg
Clean & Jerk	Lại Gia Thành; Vietnam	146 kg	Ngô Sơn Đỉnh; Vietnam	144 kg	Natthawat Chomchuen; Thailand	143 kg
Total	Lại Gia Thành; Vietnam	269 kg	Ngô Sơn Đỉnh; Vietnam	261 kg	Natthawat Chomchuen; Thailand	259 kg
61 kg
Snatch	Li Fabin; China	141 kg	Sergio Massidda; Italy	137 kg	Shota Mishvelidze; Georgia	136 kg
Clean & Jerk	Hampton Morris; United States	168 kg	Li Fabin; China	167 kg	Aniq Kasdan; Malaysia	166 kg
Total	Li Fabin; China	308 kg	Sergio Massidda; Italy	302 kg	Ding Hongjie; China	301 kg
67 kg
Snatch	Chen Lijun; China	153 kg	Eko Yuli Irawan; Indonesia	146 kg	Gor Sahakyan; Armenia	142 kg
Clean & Jerk	Chen Lijun; China	180 kg	Francisco Mosquera; Colombia	176 kg	Lee Sang-yeon; South Korea	176 kg
Total	Chen Lijun; China	333 kg	Eko Yuli Irawan; Indonesia	321 kg	Gor Sahakyan; Armenia	312 kg
73 kg
Snatch	Wei Yinting; China	157 kg	Weeraphon Wichuma; Thailand	154 kg	Ritvars Suharevs; Latvia	154 kg
Clean & Jerk	Weeraphon Wichuma; Thailand	195 kg	Bak Joo-hyo; South Korea	187 kg	Muhammed Furkan Özbek; Turkey	187 kg
Total	Weeraphon Wichuma; Thailand	349 kg	Wei Yinting; China	337 kg	Muhammed Furkan Özbek; Turkey	334 kg
81 kg
Snatch	Mukhammadkodir Toshtemirov; Uzbekistan	164 kg	Oscar Reyes; Italy	163 kg	Rafik Harutyunyan; Armenia	162 kg
Clean & Jerk	Rahmat Erwin Abdullah; Indonesia	209 kg WR	Bozhidar Andreev; Bulgaria	195 kg	Gaýgysyz Töräýew; Turkmenistan	193 kg
Total	Oscar Reyes; Italy	356 kg	Rahmat Erwin Abdullah; Indonesia	354 kg	Mukhammadkodir Toshtemirov; Uzbekistan	352 kg
89 kg
Snatch	Andranik Karapetyan; Armenia	175 kg	Marin Robu; Moldova	173 kg	Keydomar Vallenilla; Venezuela	171 kg
Clean & Jerk	Mirmostafa Javadi; Iran	215 kg	Li Dayin; China	213 kg	Keydomar Vallenilla; Venezuela	210 kg
Total	Mirmostafa Javadi; Iran	384 kg	Li Dayin; China	383 kg	Keydomar Vallenilla; Venezuela	381 kg
96 kg
Snatch	Qasim Al-Lami; Iraq	175 kg	Karim Abokahla; Egypt	174 kg	Won Jong-beom; South Korea	172 kg
Clean & Jerk	Karim Abokahla; Egypt	213 kg	Won Jong-beom; South Korea	212 kg	Mahmoud Hassan; Egypt	209 kg
Total	Karim Abokahla; Egypt	387 kg	Won Jong-beom; South Korea	384 kg	Qasim Al-Lami; Iraq	379 kg
102 kg
Snatch	Yauheni Tsikhantsou; Individual Neutral Athletes	183 kg	Garik Karapetyan; Armenia	183 kg	Jang Yeon-hak; South Korea	182 kg
Clean & Jerk	Liu Huanhua; China	224 kg	Fares El-Bakh; Qatar	218 kg	Jang Yeon-hak; South Korea	217 kg
Total	Liu Huanhua; China	404 kg	Jang Yeon-hak; South Korea	399 kg	Yauheni Tsikhantsou; Individual Neutral Athletes	394 kg
109 kg
Snatch	Akbar Djuraev; Uzbekistan	189 kg	Hristo Hristov; Bulgaria	181 kg	Dadash Dadashbayli; Azerbaijan	180 kg
Clean & Jerk	Ruslan Nurudinov; Uzbekistan	227 kg	Akbar Djuraev; Uzbekistan	226 kg	Dadash Dadashbayli; Azerbaijan	223 kg
Total	Akbar Djuraev; Uzbekistan	415 kg	Ruslan Nurudinov; Uzbekistan	407 kg	Dadash Dadashbayli; Azerbaijan	403 kg
+109 kg
Snatch	Lasha Talakhadze; Georgia	220 kg	Gor Minasyan; Bahrain	213 kg	Varazdat Lalayan; Armenia	212 kg
Clean & Jerk	Lasha Talakhadze; Georgia	253 kg	Simon Martirosyan; Armenia	250 kg	Ali Davoudi; Iran	249 kg
Total	Lasha Talakhadze; Georgia	473 kg	Varazdat Lalayan; Armenia	460 kg	Gor Minasyan; Bahrain	459 kg

=== Women ===
Event	Gold		Silver		Bronze	
45 kg
Snatch	Sirivimon Pramongkhol; Thailand	78 kg	Rosina Randafiarison; Madagascar	77 kg	Cansu Bektaş; Turkey	75 kg
Clean & Jerk	Sirivimon Pramongkhol; Thailand	101 kg	Rosina Randafiarison; Madagascar	93 kg	Cansu Bektaş; Turkey	87 kg
Total	Sirivimon Pramongkhol; Thailand	179 kg	Rosina Randafiarison; Madagascar	170 kg	Cansu Bektaş; Turkey	162 kg
49 kg
Snatch	Hou Zhihui; China	95 kg	Jiang Huihua; China	95 kg	Mihaela Cambei; Romania	90 kg
Clean & Jerk	Jiang Huihua; China	120 kg WR	Hou Zhihui; China	116 kg	Jourdan Delacruz; United States	112 kg
Total	Jiang Huihua; China	215 kg WR	Hou Zhihui; China	211 kg	Jourdan Delacruz; United States	200 kg
55 kg
Snatch	Chen Guan-ling; Chinese Taipei	91 kg	Rohelys Galvis; Colombia	90 kg	Irene Borrego; Mexico	89 kg
Clean & Jerk	Chen Guan-ling; Chinese Taipei	112 kg	Rohelys Galvis; Colombia	111 kg	Rosalba Morales; Colombia	110 kg
Total	Chen Guan-ling; Chinese Taipei	203 kg	Rohelys Galvis; Colombia	201 kg	Irene Borrego; Mexico	199 kg
59 kg
Snatch	Luo Shifang; China	107 kg	Kamila Konotop; Ukraine	106 kg	Pei Xinyi; China	102 kg
Clean & Jerk	Luo Shifang; China	136 kg	Kuo Hsing-chun; Chinese Taipei	130 kg	Kamila Konotop; Ukraine	130 kg
Total	Luo Shifang; China	243 kg	Kamila Konotop; Ukraine	236 kg	Pei Xinyi; China	232 kg
64 kg
Snatch	Natalia Llamosa; Colombia	101 kg	Julieth Rodríguez; Colombia	101 kg	Ruth Ayodele; Nigeria	100 kg
Clean & Jerk	Park Min-kyung; South Korea	123 kg	Ruth Ayodele; Nigeria	122 kg	Natalia Llamosa; Colombia	122 kg
Total	Natalia Llamosa; Colombia	223 kg	Ruth Ayodele; Nigeria	222 kg	Park Min-kyung; South Korea	220 kg
71 kg
Snatch	Liao Guifang; China	120 kg	Angie Palacios; Ecuador	117 kg	Olivia Reeves; United States	111 kg
Clean & Jerk	Liao Guifang; China	153 kg WR	Olivia Reeves; United States	142 kg	Angie Palacios; Ecuador	138 kg
Total	Liao Guifang; China	273 kg WR	Angie Palacios; Ecuador	255 kg	Olivia Reeves; United States	253 kg
76 kg
Snatch	Sara Ahmed; Egypt	108 kg	Kim Su-hyeon; South Korea	106 kg	Hellen Escobar; Colombia	106 kg
Clean & Jerk	Sara Ahmed; Egypt	138 kg	Hellen Escobar; Colombia	136 kg	Bella Paredes; Ecuador	135 kg
Total	Sara Ahmed; Egypt	246 kg	Hellen Escobar; Colombia	242 kg	Bella Paredes; Ecuador	240 kg
81 kg
Snatch	Wang Zhouyu; China	122 kg	Liang Xiaomei; China	122 kg	Neisi Dájomes; Ecuador	115 kg
Clean & Jerk	Liang Xiaomei; China	159 kg WR	Wang Zhouyu; China	155 kg	Eileen Cikamatana; Australia	146 kg
Total	Liang Xiaomei; China	281 kg	Wang Zhouyu; China	277 kg	Eileen Cikamatana; Australia	256 kg
87 kg
Snatch	Lo Ying-yuan; Chinese Taipei	112 kg	Jung A-ram; South Korea	107 kg	Anastasiia Manievska; Ukraine	106 kg
Clean & Jerk	Solfrid Koanda; Norway	156 kg	Yeinny Geles; Colombia	138 kg	Jung A-ram; South Korea	134 kg
Total	Lo Ying-yuan; Chinese Taipei	245 kg	Yeinny Geles; Colombia	244 kg	Jung A-ram; South Korea	241 kg
+87 kg
Snatch	Park Hye-jeong; South Korea	124 kg	Son Young-hee; South Korea	122 kg	Lisseth Ayoví; Ecuador	121 kg
Clean & Jerk	Park Hye-jeong; South Korea	165 kg	Mary Theisen-Lappen; United States	160 kg	Lisseth Ayoví; Ecuador	155 kg
Total	Park Hye-jeong; South Korea	289 kg	Mary Theisen-Lappen; United States	277 kg	Lisseth Ayoví; Ecuador	276 kg

== Team ranking ==
=== Men ===
Rank	Team	Points
1	Armenia	522
2	China	492
3	Iran	458
4	Colombia	440
5	Uzbekistan	429
6	South Korea	399

=== Women ===
Rank	Team	Points
1	Colombia	619
2	United States	559
3	China	554
4	Chinese Taipei	520
5	South Korea	434
6	Mexico	368

== Participating nations ==
A total of 719 competitors from 117 nations participated.

- Afghanistan (2) (Note: The IWF continues to recognize the de jure Islamic Republic of Afghanistan.)
- AIN (10)
- Albania (3)
- Algeria (4)
- Argentina (1)
- Armenia (14)
- Australia (9)
- Austria (2)
- Azerbaijan (6)
- Bahrain (3)
- Bangladesh (1)
- Belgium (1)
- Bosnia and Herzegovina (2)
- Botswana (1)
- Brazil (4)
- Brunei (2)
- Bulgaria (10)
- Cameroon (5)
- Canada (16)
- Chile (4)
- China (18)
- Chinese Taipei (16)
- Cook Islands (1)
- Colombia (20)
- Croatia (3)
- Cuba (5)
- Czech Republic (6)
- Denmark (5)
- Dominican Republic (5)
- Ecuador (9)
- Egypt (7)
- Estonia (3)
- Fiji (1)
- Finland (5)
- France (9)
- Georgia (11)
- Germany (7)
- Ghana (4)
- Great Britain (11)
- Greece (4)
- Guam (1)
- Guatemala (3)
- Honduras (3)
- Hungary (2)
- Iceland (3)
- India (6)
- Indonesia (15)
- Iran (16)
- Iraq (6)
- Ireland (6)
- Israel (4)
- Italy (9)
- Jamaica (2)
- Japan (14)
- Jordan (1)
- Kazakhstan (12)
- Kenya (8)
- Kiribati (2)
- Kuwait (8)
- Kyrgyzstan (2)
- Latvia (4)
- Lebanon (2)
- Libya (2)
- Lithuania (6)
- Madagascar (4)
- Malaysia (2)
- Malta (1)
- Marshall Islands (1)
- Mauritius (1)
- Mexico (19)
- Moldova (4)
- Mongolia (10)
- Morocco (5)
- Nauru (1)
- Nepal (5)
- Netherlands (5)
- Nigeria (6)
- New Zealand (6)
- Norway (5)
- Oman (2)
- Papua New Guinea (2)
- Peru (4)
- Philippines (7)
- Poland (10)
- Portugal (10)
- Puerto Rico (5)
- Qatar (1)
- Romania (8)
- Samoa (3)
- Saudi Arabia (20)
- Serbia (1)
- Sierra Leone (1)
- Slovakia (6)
- Solomon Islands (1)
- South Africa (3)
- South Korea (19)
- Spain (18)
- Sri Lanka (3)
- Sweden (4)
- Switzerland (1)
- Syria (1)
- Thailand (16)
- Tonga (1)
- Tunisia (5)
- Turkey (12)
- Turkmenistan (15)
- Tuvalu (1)
- Uganda (3)
- Ukraine (7)
- United Arab Emirates (2)
- United States (20)
- Uzbekistan (13)
- Vanuatu (2)
- Venezuela (15)
- Vietnam (7)
- IWF Refugee Team (6) (Note: The team competed under the IWF flag and the Olympic Anthem, and used the country code WRT.)
- Yemen (2)

North Korea entered a team in July 2023, but was disqualified due to not allowing independent anti-doping testers into the country.

== See also ==
- List of World Championships medalists in weightlifting (men)
- List of World Championships medalists in weightlifting (women)
