= Li Fabin =

Chinese weightlifter (born 1993)

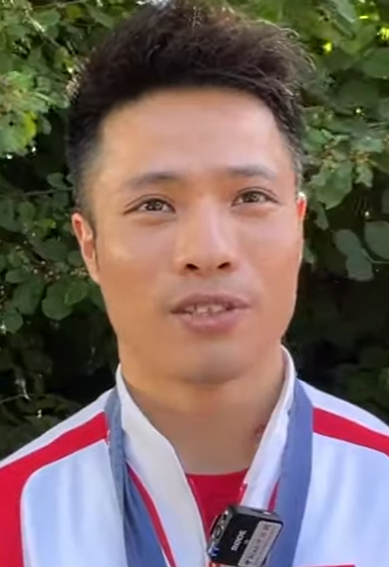
- Li in 2024

Personal information
- Nationality: Chinese
- Born: 15 January 1993 (age 33) Nan'an, Quanzhou, Fujian, China
- Height: 1.60 m (5 ft 3 in)
- Weight: 60.80 kg (134 lb)

Sport
- Country: China
- Sport: Weightlifting
- Event: –61 kg
- Club: Fujian Province

Achievements and titles
- Personal bests: Snatch: 146 kg (2024. CWR); Clean & Jerk: 175 kg (2022, WR); Total: 318 kg (2019, CWR)
Medal record
Men's weightlifting
Representing China
Olympic Games
Gold medal – first place	2020 Tokyo	–61 kg
Gold medal – first place	2024 Paris	–61 kg
World Championships
Gold medal – first place	2019 Pattaya	–61 kg
Gold medal – first place	2022 Bogotá	–61 kg
Gold medal – first place	2023 Riyadh	–61 kg
Silver medal – second place	2018 Ashgabat	–61 kg
Asian Games
Gold medal – first place	2022 Hangzhou	–61 kg
Asian Championships
Gold medal – first place	2012 Pyeongtaek	–56 kg
Gold medal – first place	2019 Ningbo	–61 kg
Gold medal – first place	2020 Tashkent	–61 kg
Gold medal – first place	2023 Jinju	–61 kg
Silver medal – second place	2017 Ashgabat	–56 kg
Bronze medal – third place	2016 Tashkent	–56 kg

Li Fabin (Chinese: 李发彬; pinyin: Lǐ Fābīn; born 15 January 1993) is a Chinese weightlifter, two-times Olympic gold medalist, World Champion, and four time Asian Champion competing in the 56 kg division until 2018 and 61 kg starting in 2018 after the International Weightlifting Federation reorganized the categories.

== Career ==
He competed at the 2018 World Championships in the newly created 61 kg category, winning a silver medal in the snatch and in the total. He competed at the 2019 Asian Weightlifting Championships in the 61 kg division winning gold medals in all lifts.

In 2021, he won the gold medal in the men's 61 kg event at the 2020 Summer Olympics in Tokyo, Japan.

In August 2024, he competed in the men's 61 kg event at the 2024 Summer Olympics held in Paris, France. He won his second gold medal setting an Olympic record in Snatch (143 kg).

== Major results ==
Year	Venue	Weight	Snatch (kg)				Clean & Jerk (kg)				Total	Rank
Year	Venue	Weight	1	2	3	Rank	1	2	3	Rank	Total	Rank
Summer Olympics
2021	Japan Tokyo, Japan	61 kg	~~137~~	137	141	—N/a	166	172 OR	~~178~~	—N/a	313 OR	1st place, gold medalist(s)
2024	France Paris, France	61 kg	137	140	143 OR	—N/a	~~167~~	167	~~172~~	—N/a	310	1st place, gold medalist(s)
World Championships
2014	Kazakhstan Almaty, Kazakhstan	56 kg	130	134	~~135~~	2nd place, silver medalist(s)	157	~~162~~	~~162~~	4	291	4
2018	Turkmenistan Ashgabat, Turkmenistan	61 kg	133	138	142	2nd place, silver medalist(s)	160	165	168	4	310	2nd place, silver medalist(s)
2019	Thailand Pattaya, Thailand	61 kg	138	141	145 WR	1st place, gold medalist(s)	168	173	~~175~~	1st place, gold medalist(s)	318 CWR	1st place, gold medalist(s)
2022	Colombia Bogotá, Colombia	61 kg	137	~~140~~	~~140~~	1st place, gold medalist(s)	167	~~175~~	175 WR	1st place, gold medalist(s)	312	1st place, gold medalist(s)
2023	Saudi Arabia Riyadh, Saudi Arabia	61 kg	137	141	~~146~~	1st place, gold medalist(s)	~~167~~	167	~~169~~	2nd place, silver medalist(s)	308	1st place, gold medalist(s)
IWF World Cup
2024	Thailand Phuket, Thailand	61 kg	138	143	146 CWR	1st place, gold medalist(s)	166	~~173~~	~~173~~	5	312	1st place, gold medalist(s)
Asian Games
2023	China Hangzhou, China	61 kg	137	141	143 GR	—N/a	167	~~171~~	~~171~~	—N/a	310 GR	1st place, gold medalist(s)
Asian Championships
2012	South Korea Pyeongtaek, South Korea	56 kg	121	125	126	1st place, gold medalist(s)	150	153	~~155~~	3rd place, bronze medalist(s)	279	1st place, gold medalist(s)
2016	Uzbekistan Tashkent, Uzbekistan	56 kg	121	~~126~~	126	2nd place, silver medalist(s)	142	~~147~~	147	4	273	3rd place, bronze medalist(s)
2017	Turkmenistan Ashgabat, Turkmenistan	56 kg	~~123~~	123	~~125~~	2nd place, silver medalist(s)	~~145~~	145	149	2nd place, silver medalist(s)	272	2nd place, silver medalist(s)
2019	China Ningbo, China	61 kg	137	~~141~~	141	1st place, gold medalist(s)	167	171	~~175~~	1st place, gold medalist(s)	312	1st place, gold medalist(s)
2021	Uzbekistan Tashkent, Uzbekistan	61 kg	138	~~142~~	142	1st place, gold medalist(s)	170	~~176~~	~~176~~	1st place, gold medalist(s)	312	1st place, gold medalist(s)
2023	South Korea Jinju, South Korea	61 kg	136	141	143	1st place, gold medalist(s)	166	171	~~174~~	1st place, gold medalist(s)	314	1st place, gold medalist(s)

Olympic Games
Preceded by Su Bingtian	Flagbearer for China at the Olympics closing ceremony (with Ou Zixia); Paris 2024	Succeeded by Incumbent
