= 2015 World Weightlifting Championships – Men's 105 kg =

The men's 105 kilograms event at the 2015 World Weightlifting Championships was held on 26 and 27 November 2015 in Houston, United States.

== Schedule ==
Date	Time	Event
26 November 2015	17:25	Group C
27 November 2015	12:00	Group B
27 November 2015	17:25	Group A

== Medalists ==
Event	Gold		Silver		Bronze	
Snatch	Ivan Efremov (UZB)	192 kg	Alexandr Zaichikov (KAZ)	191 kg	Simon Martirosyan (ARM)	186 kg
Clean & Jerk	David Bedzhanyan (RUS)	231 kg	Alexandr Zaichikov (KAZ)	230 kg	Sardorbek Dusmurotov (UZB)	228 kg
Total	Alexandr Zaichikov (KAZ)	421 kg	David Bedzhanyan (RUS)	411 kg	Artūrs Plēsnieks (LAT)	405 kg

== Records ==
Prior to this competition, the existing world records were as follows.

World record	Snatch	Andrei Aramnau (BLR)	200 kg	Beijing, China	18 August 2008
World record	Clean & Jerk	Ilya Ilyin (KAZ)	242 kg	Almaty, Kazakhstan	15 November 2014
World record	Total	Andrei Aramnau (BLR)	436 kg	Beijing, China	18 August 2008

== Results ==
Rank	Athlete	Group	Body weight	Snatch (kg)				Clean & Jerk (kg)				Total
Rank	Athlete	Group	Body weight	1	2	3	Rank	1	2	3	Rank	Total
1st place, gold medalist(s)	Alexandr Zaichikov (KAZ)	A	104.37	186	~~191~~	191	2nd place, silver medalist(s)	225	230	~~233~~	2nd place, silver medalist(s)	421
2nd place, silver medalist(s)	David Bedzhanyan (RUS)	A	104.90	180	~~185~~	~~186~~	8	225	231	~~242~~	1st place, gold medalist(s)	411
3rd place, bronze medalist(s)	Artūrs Plēsnieks (LAT)	A	104.07	175	179	~~182~~	9	217	222	226	4	405
4	Timur Naniev (RUS)	A	104.68	182	~~187~~	~~187~~	4	~~222~~	222	~~227~~	5	404
5	Simon Martirosyan (ARM)	A	104.80	180	186	~~191~~	3rd place, bronze medalist(s)	~~216~~	~~216~~	216	8	402
6	Arkadiusz Michalski (POL)	A	104.99	175	178	~~181~~	12	220	~~228~~	~~228~~	6	398
7	Roman Zaitsev (UKR)	A	103.53	173	178	180	6	214	~~216~~	216	7	396
8	Ivan Efremov (UZB)	A	104.89	183	187	192	1st place, gold medalist(s)	204	~~215~~	~~216~~	18	396
9	Sardorbek Dusmurotov (UZB)	B	104.43	163	166	~~169~~	19	218	225	228	3rd place, bronze medalist(s)	394
10	Aliaksandr Bersanau (BLR)	B	97.57	165	173	178	10	206	215	~~218~~	9	393
11	Jürgen Spieß (GER)	B	104.30	165	~~170~~	170	14	205	~~210~~	211	11	381
12	Jesús González (VEN)	B	104.95	~~171~~	171	176	13	204	~~209~~	~~209~~	19	380
13	Ferenc Gyurkovics (HUN)	B	104.64	~~170~~	170	~~175~~	15	195	~~206~~	206	16	376
14	Ryunosuke Mochida (JPN)	C	104.44	158	163	167	18	~~202~~	202	208	13	375
15	Robby Behm (GER)	B	104.52	162	~~167~~	~~167~~	25	201	207	213	10	375
16	Giorgi Chkheidze (GEO)	C	104.85	160	165	168	17	197	202	207	15	375
17	Gaber Mohamed (EGY)	B	104.61	163	~~168~~	~~169~~	24	202	207	—	14	370
18	Vasil Gospodinov (BUL)	C	101.96	165	~~172~~	~~172~~	20	196	203	~~208~~	20	368
19	Hiroaki Shiraishi (JPN)	C	104.79	157	~~161~~	~~161~~	30	200	206	209	12	366
20	Nailkhan Nabiyev (AZE)	C	94.15	158	~~163~~	163	23	202	~~211~~	~~212~~	21	365
21	Arnas Šidiškis (LTU)	C	102.89	160	165	~~170~~	21	192	197	~~200~~	23	362
22	Resul Elvan (TUR)	C	104.16	~~160~~	~~160~~	161	26	201	~~205~~	~~208~~	22	362
23	Alejandro Cisnero (CUB)	C	104.00	150	155	160	27	190	195	~~200~~	24	355
24	Gia Machavariani (GEO)	C	104.80	160	~~165~~	165	22	190	~~197~~	~~197~~	28	355
25	Kévin Bouly (FRA)	C	104.08	153	~~157~~	157	28	194	~~199~~	~~199~~	25	351
26	David Katoatau (KIR)	C	104.35	140	145	~~150~~	32	200	205	~~208~~	17	350
27	Sergej Lichovoj (LTU)	C	104.47	157	~~164~~	~~164~~	29	192	~~200~~	~~200~~	26	349
28	Patrik Krywult (CZE)	C	100.39	150	155	~~158~~	31	181	187	190	27	345
—	Navab Nassirshalal (IRI)	A	104.55	~~181~~	181	~~186~~	5	~~220~~	~~223~~	~~226~~	—	—
—	Jorge Arroyo (ECU)	B	104.62	170	175	180	7	~~201~~	~~201~~	~~201~~	—	—
—	Sargis Martirosjan (AUT)	B	104.71	178	~~181~~	~~183~~	11	~~202~~	~~202~~	~~202~~	—	—
—	Seo Hui-yeop (KOR)	A	104.65	170	~~175~~	~~175~~	16	~~215~~	~~215~~	~~215~~	—	—
—	Bartłomiej Bonk (POL)	A	103.46	~~183~~	~~183~~	~~183~~	—	—	—	—	—	—
—	Mateus Gregório (BRA)	B	104.15	~~170~~	~~170~~	~~170~~	—	—	—	—	—	—
DQ	Dadash Dadashbayli (AZE)	B	98.38	175	180	185	—	210	~~218~~	~~220~~	—	395
