= 2011 World Weightlifting Championships – Men's 105 kg =

The men's competition in the heavyweight (– 105 kg) division was held on 11–12 November 2011.

== Schedule ==
| Date | Time | Event |
|---|---|---|
| 11 November 2011 | 16:30 | Group C |
| 12 November 2011 | 11:30 | Group B |
| 12 November 2011 | 19:00 | Group A |

== Medalists ==
| Event | Gold | | Silver | | Bronze | |
|---|---|---|---|---|---|---|
| Snatch | Khadzhimurat Akkaev (RUS) | 198 kg | Dmitry Klokov (RUS) | 196 kg | Gia Machavariani (GEO) | 187 kg |
| Clean & Jerk | Khadzhimurat Akkaev (RUS) | 232 kg | Dmitry Klokov (RUS) | 232 kg | Oleksiy Torokhtiy (UKR) | 229 kg |
| Total | Khadzhimurat Akkaev (RUS) | 430 kg | Dmitry Klokov (RUS) | 428 kg | Oleksiy Torokhtiy (UKR) | 410 kg |

== Records ==
Prior to this competition, the existing world records were as follows.

| World record | Snatch | Andrei Aramnau (BLR) | 200 kg | Beijing, China | 18 August 2008 |
| World record | Clean & jerk | Alan Tsagaev (BUL) | 237 kg | Kyiv, Ukraine | 25 April 2004 |
| World record | Total | Andrei Aramnau (BLR) | 436 kg | Beijing, China | 18 August 2008 |

== Results ==
| Rank | Athlete | Group | Body weight | Snatch (kg) | | | | Clean & Jerk (kg) | | | | Total |
| Rank | Athlete | Group | Body weight | 1 | 2 | 3 | Rank | 1 | 2 | 3 | Rank | Total |
|---|---|---|---|---|---|---|---|---|---|---|---|---|
| 1st place, gold medalist(s) | Khadzhimurat Akkaev (RUS) | A | 104.44 | 190 | 195 | 198 | 1st place, gold medalist(s) | 222 | 228 | 232 | 1st place, gold medalist(s) | 430 |
| 2nd place, silver medalist(s) | Dmitry Klokov (RUS) | A | 104.60 | 187 | 192 | 196 | 2nd place, silver medalist(s) | 220 | 225 | 232 | 2nd place, silver medalist(s) | 428 |
| 3rd place, bronze medalist(s) | Oleksiy Torokhtiy (UKR) | A | 104.27 | 176 | 181 | ~~185~~ | 5 | 220 | ~~229~~ | 229 | 3rd place, bronze medalist(s) | 410 |
| 4 | Gia Machavariani (GEO) | A | 104.00 | 180 | 184 | 187 | 3rd place, bronze medalist(s) | 212 | 218 | 222 | 6 | 409 |
| 5 | Bartłomiej Bonk (POL) | A | 104.25 | 185 | ~~190~~ | ~~190~~ | 4 | 215 | ~~221~~ | 221 | 7 | 406 |
| 6 | Navab Nassirshalal (IRI) | A | 103.91 | 175 | 180 | ~~185~~ | 6 | ~~211~~ | 211 | 223 | 5 | 403 |
| 7 | Kim Chul-min (KOR) | A | 104.62 | 172 | ~~178~~ | ~~178~~ | 11 | 213 | ~~221~~ | 224 | 4 | 396 |
| 8 | Mikhail Audzeyeu (BLR) | A | 104.71 | 175 | ~~180~~ | 180 | 7 | ~~210~~ | 210 | 215 | 11 | 395 |
| 9 | Sergey Istomin (KAZ) | A | 104.41 | 178 | ~~182~~ | ~~182~~ | 8 | 210 | 215 | ~~221~~ | 10 | 393 |
| 10 | Mohammad Reza Barari (IRI) | A | 104.56 | 170 | ~~175~~ | ~~175~~ | 14 | 211 | ~~221~~ | 221 | 8 | 391 |
| 11 | Ivan Efremov (UZB) | A | 103.35 | 175 | ~~180~~ | ~~185~~ | 10 | 215 | ~~221~~ | ~~222~~ | 9 | 390 |
| 12 | Kornel Czekiel (POL) | B | 104.99 | 168 | ~~172~~ | 172 | 12 | 202 | 207 | 214 | 12 | 386 |
| 13 | Jorge Arroyo (ECU) | B | 101.47 | ~~175~~ | ~~175~~ | 175 | 9 | 200 | 205 | 210 | 14 | 385 |
| 14 | Artūrs Plēsnieks (LAT) | B | 104.15 | 163 | ~~168~~ | 168 | 16 | 207 | 212 | ~~216~~ | 13 | 380 |
| 15 | Mohamed Hosny (EGY) | B | 104.83 | ~~170~~ | ~~170~~ | 170 | 15 | 205 | 210 | ~~215~~ | 15 | 380 |
| 16 | Davit Gogia (GEO) | B | 104.21 | ~~167~~ | 167 | 171 | 13 | 200 | 205 | ~~208~~ | 16 | 376 |
| 17 | Robby Behm (GER) | C | 104.68 | 156 | 160 | ~~163~~ | 20 | 191 | 196 | 200 | 18 | 360 |
| 18 | Tornike Kokaia (AZE) | B | 104.04 | 157 | ~~162~~ | ~~162~~ | 22 | ~~195~~ | ~~199~~ | 200 | 17 | 357 |
| 19 | Lukáš Kožienka (SVK) | B | 102.48 | 153 | 158 | ~~160~~ | 21 | ~~197~~ | ~~198~~ | 198 | 19 | 356 |
| 20 | Julio Luna (VEN) | B | 103.93 | ~~155~~ | 155 | 160 | 17 | 195 | ~~202~~ | ~~202~~ | 22 | 355 |
| 21 | Donny Shankle (USA) | B | 104.07 | ~~160~~ | ~~160~~ | 160 | 18 | ~~195~~ | 195 | ~~210~~ | 23 | 355 |
| 22 | Kévin Bouly (FRA) | C | 103.05 | 149 | 154 | ~~159~~ | 25 | 188 | 194 | 198 | 20 | 352 |
| 23 | Modestas Šimkus (LTU) | B | 104.36 | ~~160~~ | 160 | — | 19 | 185 | 192 | ~~198~~ | 26 | 352 |
| 24 | Žygimantas Stanulis (LTU) | C | 96.45 | 155 | ~~160~~ | ~~163~~ | 23 | ~~191~~ | 191 | 196 | 21 | 351 |
| 25 | Yang Chih-yu (TPE) | C | 104.33 | 150 | 155 | ~~158~~ | 24 | 185 | 193 | ~~196~~ | 25 | 348 |
| 26 | Niusila Opeloge (SAM) | C | 104.73 | 150 | ~~155~~ | ~~155~~ | 27 | ~~195~~ | 195 | ~~203~~ | 24 | 345 |
| 27 | Jorge García (CHI) | C | 103.77 | 146 | ~~151~~ | 151 | 26 | 180 | 186 | ~~190~~ | 27 | 337 |
| 28 | Ben Watson (GBR) | C | 97.84 | 135 | 140 | ~~145~~ | 28 | 155 | 160 | ~~165~~ | 28 | 300 |
| — | Ferenc Gyurkovics (HUN) | B | 104.79 | — | — | — | — | — | — | — | — | — |
| DQ | Vladimir Sedov (KAZ) | B | 94.65 | 175 | 180 | ~~183~~ | — | 205 | ~~210~~ | ~~210~~ | — | — |
| DQ | Libor Wälzer (CZE) | C | 104.44 | 155 | ~~160~~ | ~~160~~ | — | 191 | ~~195~~ | ~~195~~ | — | — |
