= 2014 World Weightlifting Championships – Men's 105 kg =

The men's 105 kilograms event at the 2014 World Weightlifting Championships was held on 14–15 November 2014 in Baluan Sholak Sports Palace, Almaty, Kazakhstan.

== Schedule ==
Date	Time	Event
14 November 2014	09:00	Group D
14 November 2014	11:00	Group C
15 November 2014	11:00	Group B
15 November 2014	19:00	Group A

== Medalists ==
Event	Gold		Silver		Bronze	
Snatch	Ruslan Nurudinov (UZB)	193 kg	Yang Zhe (CHN)	191 kg	Ilya Ilyin (KAZ)	190 kg
Clean & Jerk	Ilya Ilyin (KAZ)	242 kg	David Bedzhanyan (RUS)	240 kg	Ruslan Nurudinov (UZB)	239 kg
Total	Ilya Ilyin (KAZ)	432 kg	Ruslan Nurudinov (UZB)	432 kg	David Bedzhanyan (RUS)	427 kg

== Records ==
Prior to this competition, the existing world records were as follows.

World Record	Snatch	Andrei Aramnau (BLR)	200 kg	Beijing, China	18 August 2008
World Record	Clean & Jerk	David Bedzhanyan (RUS)	238 kg	Belgorod, Russia	17 December 2011
World Record	Total	Andrei Aramnau (BLR)	436 kg	Beijing, China	18 August 2008

== Results ==
Rank	Athlete	Group	Body weight	Snatch (kg)				Clean & Jerk (kg)				Total
Rank	Athlete	Group	Body weight	1	2	3	Rank	1	2	3	Rank	Total
1st place, gold medalist(s)	Ilya Ilyin (KAZ)	A	104.35	183	187	190	3rd place, bronze medalist(s)	233	~~239~~	242	1st place, gold medalist(s)	432
2nd place, silver medalist(s)	Ruslan Nurudinov (UZB)	A	104.78	185	190	193	1st place, gold medalist(s)	220	230	239	3rd place, bronze medalist(s)	432
3rd place, bronze medalist(s)	David Bedzhanyan (RUS)	A	104.25	180	185	187	4	225	~~236~~	240	2nd place, silver medalist(s)	427
4	Yang Zhe (CHN)	A	103.89	186	191	~~193~~	2nd place, silver medalist(s)	~~220~~	220	~~223~~	6	411
5	Kia Ghadami (IRI)	A	103.87	171	178	~~181~~	9	210	220	~~223~~	5	398
6	Arkadiusz Michalski (POL)	A	104.79	~~175~~	175	~~180~~	12	216	222	~~224~~	4	397
7	Simon Martirosyan (ARM)	A	104.77	178	~~183~~	183	5	213	~~220~~	~~221~~	11	396
8	Kim Min-jae (KOR)	B	102.20	175	180	~~185~~	6	210	215	~~221~~	9	395
9	Andrian Zbîrnea (MDA)	B	104.52	175	180	~~185~~	8	210	215	~~220~~	10	395
10	Artūrs Plēsnieks (LAT)	A	103.78	174	~~178~~	~~178~~	14	~~215~~	~~216~~	216	8	390
11	Sardorbek Dusmurotov (UZB)	B	104.05	160	~~166~~	167	22	213	219	~~228~~	7	386
12	Sargis Martirosjan (AUT)	B	104.24	176	180	~~183~~	7	202	206	~~211~~	18	386
13	Mohsen Bahramzadeh (IRI)	A	104.09	~~178~~	178	~~188~~	10	206	~~212~~	~~212~~	17	384
14	Ferenc Gyurkovics (HUN)	B	104.89	170	175	~~180~~	13	192	202	205	20	380
15	Matej Kováč (SVK)	B	103.17	~~166~~	~~167~~	168	19	200	~~209~~	209	13	377
16	Jürgen Spieß (GER)	B	103.50	~~167~~	~~167~~	167	21	204	210	~~213~~	12	377
17	Łukasz Grela (POL)	C	94.56	170	175	~~178~~	11	190	~~200~~	201	22	376
18	Robby Behm (GER)	C	104.24	~~162~~	162	~~166~~	25	201	205	209	14	371
19	Jeon Dae-un (KOR)	C	104.69	160	165	170	17	201	~~210~~	~~210~~	25	371
20	Mateus Gregório (BRA)	B	104.11	~~170~~	~~170~~	170	16	200	~~207~~	~~210~~	26	370
21	Hsieh Wei-chun (TPE)	C	102.02	153	160	165	23	201	~~210~~	~~210~~	24	366
22	Resul Elvan (TUR)	C	104.46	155	~~160~~	160	28	201	206	~~211~~	19	366
23	Gia Machavariani (GEO)	C	104.38	~~168~~	~~168~~	168	20	195	~~203~~	~~203~~	27	363
24	Andrew Davis (USA)	D	102.78	155	~~160~~	~~160~~	33	195	207	~~210~~	15	362
25	Radoslav Tatarčík (SVK)	D	103.51	167	171	173	15	186	189	~~192~~	30	362
26	Hiroaki Shiraishi (JPN)	C	104.68	157	160	~~163~~	29	202	~~207~~	~~207~~	21	362
27	Roman Zaitsev (UKR)	C	100.59	~~160~~	160	~~163~~	27	~~201~~	201	~~205~~	23	361
28	Ryunosuke Mochida (JPN)	D	104.46	~~156~~	~~156~~	156	31	~~189~~	189	192	29	348
29	D'Angelo Osorio (USA)	D	95.12	~~155~~	155	~~160~~	32	187	192	~~196~~	28	347
30	Arnas Šidiškis (LTU)	D	99.91	150	~~157~~	160	26	~~187~~	187	~~192~~	32	347
31	Jiří Gasior (CZE)	D	97.44	148	152	~~155~~	35	180	185	188	31	340
32	Patrik Krywult (CZE)	D	99.56	149	154	156	30	179	~~184~~	184	34	340
33	Andres Viksi (EST)	D	104.64	~~155~~	~~155~~	155	34	~~185~~	185	~~188~~	33	340
—	Albert Kuzilov (GEO)	B	105.00	165	~~170~~	170	18	~~205~~	~~205~~	~~205~~	—	—
—	Walid Bidani (ALG)	C	104.98	165	~~170~~	~~172~~	24	—	—	—	—	—
—	Pat Mendes (BRA)	A	103.66	~~180~~	~~182~~	~~182~~	—	~~206~~	206	~~214~~	16	—
—	Jorge Arroyo (ECU)	A	104.46	~~180~~	~~180~~	~~180~~	—	—	—	—	—	—
—	Eduardo Guadamud (ECU)	C	102.21	—	—	—	—	—	—	—	—	—

== New records ==
Clean & Jerk	239 kg	Ruslan Nurudinov (UZB)	WR
Clean & Jerk	240 kg	David Bedzhanyan (RUS)	WR
Clean & Jerk	242 kg	Ilya Ilyin (KAZ)	WR
