= List of Austrian records in Olympic weightlifting =

The following are the national records in Olympic weightlifting in Austria. Records are maintained in each weight class for the snatch lift, clean and jerk lift, and the total for both lifts by the Austrian Weightlifting Federation (Österreichischer Gewichtheberverband).

== Current records ==
=== Men ===
Event	Record	Athlete	Date	Meet	Place	Ref
60 kg
Snatch	108 kg	Standard				
Clean & Jerk	131 kg	Standard				
Total	239 kg	Standard				
65 kg
Snatch	117 kg	Standard				
Clean & Jerk	142 kg	Standard				
Total	259 kg	Standard				
70 kg
Snatch	125 kg	Standard				
Clean & Jerk	152 kg	Standard				
Total	277 kg	Standard				
75 kg
Snatch	133 kg	Standard				
Clean & Jerk	162 kg	Standard				
Total	295 kg	Standard				
85 kg
Snatch	151 kg	Hmayak Misakyan	22 April 2026	European Championships	Batumi, Georgia	
Clean & Jerk	183 kg	Standard				
Total	333 kg	Standard				
95 kg
Snatch	157 kg	Standard				
Clean & Jerk	191 kg	Elias Simbürger				
Total	348 kg	Standard				
110 kg
Snatch	167 kg	Standard				
Clean & Jerk	205 kg	Standard				
Total	372 kg	Standard				
+110 kg
Snatch	172 kg	Standard				
Clean & Jerk	210 kg	Standard				
Total	382 kg	Standard				

=== Women ===
Event	Record	Athlete	Date	Meet	Place	Ref
49 kg
Snatch	65 kg	Standard				
Clean & Jerk	79 kg	Standard				
Total	144 kg	Standard				
53 kg
Snatch	72 kg	Standard				
Clean & Jerk	87 kg	Standard				
Total	159 kg	Standard				
57 kg
Snatch	77 kg	Standard				
Clean & Jerk	94 kg	Standard				
Total	171 kg	Standard				
61 kg
Snatch	90 kg	Veronika Honcharova	1 November 2026	World Championships	Ningbo, China	
Clean & Jerk	110 kg	Veronika Honcharova	15 October 2026	European Junior Championships	Durrës, Albania	
Total	199 kg	Veronika Honcharova	15 October 2026	European Junior Championships	Durrës, Albania	
69 kg
Snatch	91 kg	Paula Zikowsky	26 April 2026		Feldkirchen in Kärnten, Austria	
Clean & Jerk	111 kg	Alina Novak	20 June 2025		Rum, Austria	
Total	201 kg	Paula Zikowsky	26 April 2026		Feldkirchen in Kärnten, Austria	
77 kg
Snatch	96 kg	Standard				
Clean & Jerk	119 kg	Standard				
Total	215 kg	Standard				
86 kg
Snatch	101 kg	Standard				
Clean & Jerk	127 kg	Standard				
Total	228 kg	Standard				
+86 kg
Snatch	105 kg	Standard				
Clean & Jerk	131 kg	Standard				
Total	236 kg	Standard				

== Historical records ==
=== Men (2018–2025) ===
Event	Record	Athlete	Date	Meet	Place	Ref
55 kg
Snatch	99 kg	Standard				
Clean & Jerk	120 kg	Standard				
Total	219 kg	Standard				
61 kg
Snatch	112 kg	Standard				
Clean & Jerk	138 kg	Standard				
Total	250 kg	Standard				
67 kg
Snatch	123 kg	Standard				
Clean & Jerk	150 kg	Standard				
Total	273 kg	Standard				
73 kg
Snatch	131 kg	Standard				
Clean & Jerk	161 kg	Standard				
Total	292 kg	Standard				
81 kg
Snatch	153 kg	Hmayak Misakyan	30 October 2024	European U23 Championships	Raszyn, Poland	
Clean & Jerk	175 kg	Hmayak Misakyan	20 October 2022	European Junior Championships	Durrës, Albania	
Total	326 kg	Hmayak Misakyan	19 April 2023	European Championships	Yerevan, Armenia	
89 kg
Snatch	150 kg	Hmayak Misakyan	30 November 2024		Ranshofen, Austria	
Clean & Jerk	185 kg	Elias Simbürger	24 September 2024	World Junior Championships	León, Spain	
Total	328 kg	Hmayak Misakyan	30 November 2024		Ranshofen, Austria	
96 kg
Snatch	152 kg	Standard				
Clean & Jerk	190 kg	Elias Simbürger	22 February 2025	European Team Championships	Linz, Austria	
Total	337 kg	Standard				
102 kg
Snatch	155 kg	Standard				
Clean & Jerk	191 kg	Patrick Dürnberger	23 November 2019		Linz, Austria	
Total	345 kg	Standard				
109 kg
Snatch	181 kg	Sargis Martirosjan	13 April 2019	European Championships	Batumi, Georgia	
Clean & Jerk	208 kg	Sargis Martirosjan	26 September 2019	World Championships	Pattaya, Thailand	
Total	387 kg	Sargis Martirosjan	13 April 2019	European Championships	Batumi, Georgia	
+109 kg
Snatch	181 kg	Sargis Martirosjan	31 January 2020	World Cup	Rome, Italy	
Clean & Jerk	209 kg	Standard				
Total	381 kg	Sargis Martirosjan	4 August 2021	Olympic Games	Tokyo, Japan	

=== Men (1998–2018) ===
Event	Record	Athlete	Date	Meet	Place	Ref
–56 kg
Snatch	97 kg	Mario Pichler	5 September 2001	European Junior Championships	Kalmar, Sweden	
Clean & Jerk	117 kg	Mario Pichler	5 September 2001	European Junior Championships	Kalmar, Sweden	
Total	215 kg	Mario Pichler	5 September 2001	European Junior Championships	Kalmar, Sweden	
–62 kg
Snatch	113 kg	Stefan Ehrengruber	9 June 2018			
Clean & Jerk	143 kg	Markus Muckenhuber	27 June 1998	World Junior Championships	Sofia, Bulgaria	
Total	255 kg	Standard				
–69 kg
Snatch	142 kg	Werner Höller	16 April 1999	European Championships	A Coruña, Spain	
Clean & Jerk	170 kg	Werner Höller	16 April 1999	European Championships	A Coruña, Spain	
Total	312 kg	Werner Höller	16 April 1999	European Championships	A Coruña, Spain	
–77 kg
Snatch	146 kg	Edvard Nazarian	28 February 2009	Bundesliga		
Clean & Jerk	180 kg	Standard				
Total	322 kg	Standard				
–85 kg
Snatch	152 kg	Standard				
Clean & Jerk	190 kg	Manfred Kraushofer	20 March 1999	Bundesliga		
Total	342 kg	Standard				
–94 kg
Snatch	166 kg	Jürgen Matzku	1 May 1999	Austrian Championships	Stockerau, Austria	
Clean & Jerk	200 kg	Jürgen Matzku	19 September 1998	Austrian Championships	Vienna, Austria	
Total	365 kg	Jürgen Matzku	19 September 1998	Austrian Championships	Vienna, Austria	
–105 kg
Snatch	183 kg	Sargis Martirosjan	1 June 2016	Fajr Cup	Tehran, Iran	
Clean & Jerk	225 kg	Matthias Steiner	26 April 2004	European Championships	Kyiv, Ukraine	
Total	405 kg	Matthias Steiner	26 April 2004	European Championships	Kyiv, Ukraine	
+105 kg
Snatch	183 kg	Matthias Steiner	3 July 2004		Tramelan, Switzerland	
Clean & Jerk	227 kg	Matthias Steiner	3 July 2004		Tramelan, Switzerland	
Total	410 kg	Matthias Steiner	3 July 2004		Tramelan, Switzerland	

=== Women (2018–2025) ===
Event	Record	Athlete	Date	Meet	Place	Ref
45 kg
Snatch	55 kg	Standard				
Clean & Jerk	68 kg	Standard				
Total	123 kg	Standard				
49 kg
Snatch	59 kg	Standard				
Clean & Jerk	72 kg	Standard				
Total	131 kg	Standard				
55 kg
Snatch	71 kg	Standard				
Clean & Jerk	89 kg	Christiane Schröcker	3 October 2020		Rum, Austria	
Total	157 kg	Standard				
59 kg
Snatch	77 kg	Bernadette Werle	3 July 2021		Öblarn, Austria	
Clean & Jerk	91 kg	Standard				
Total	167 kg	Bernadette Werle	3 July 2021		Öblarn, Austria	
64 kg
Snatch	90 kg	Paula Zikowsky	10 December 2024	World Championships	Manama, Bahrain	
Clean & Jerk	108 kg	Paula Zikowsky	2 March 2024		Brunn am Gebirge, Austria	
Total	197 kg	Paula Zikowsky	2 March 2024		Brunn am Gebirge, Austria	
71 kg
Snatch	90 kg	Victoria Hahn	1 June 2022	European Championships	Tirana, Albania	
Clean & Jerk	108 kg	Victoria Hahn	3 October 2020		Rum, Austria	
Total	194 kg	Victoria Hahn	3 October 2020		Rum, Austria	
76 kg
Snatch	91 kg	Victoria Hahn	19 September 2020		Linz, Austria	
Clean & Jerk	110 kg	Victoria Steiner	2 September 2023	Int. G. Stapfer Memorial	Ranshofen, Austria	
Total	198 kg	Victoria Hahn	19 September 2020		Linz, Austria	
81 kg
Snatch	88 kg	Standard				
Clean & Jerk	108 kg	Standard				
Total	196 kg	Standard				
87 kg
Snatch	102 kg	Sarah Fischer	10 April 2019	European Championships	Batumi, Georgia	
Clean & Jerk	129 kg	Sarah Fischer	10 April 2019	European Championships	Batumi, Georgia	
Total	231 kg	Sarah Fischer	10 April 2019	European Championships	Batumi, Georgia	
+87 kg
Snatch	106 kg	Sarah Fischer	15 December 2022	World Championships	Bogotá, Colombia	
Clean & Jerk	136 kg	Sarah Fischer	21 October 2023			
Total	241 kg	Sarah Fischer	21 October 2023			

=== Women (1998–2018) ===
Event	Record	Athlete	Date	Meet	Place	Ref
–48 kg
Snatch	61 kg	Cornelia Schlosser	14 April 2018	Austrian Championships	Linz, Austria	
Clean & Jerk	68 kg	Eva Kainz	15 May 2004	Austrian Championships	Altheim, Austria	
Total	128 kg	Eva Kainz	15 May 2004	Austrian Championships	Altheim, Austria	
–53 kg
Snatch	79 kg	Heidi Neubacher	5 May 2007	Austrian Championships	Öblarn, Austria	
Clean & Jerk	102 kg	Heidi Neubacher	5 May 2007	Austrian Championships	Öblarn, Austria	
Total	181 kg	Heidi Neubacher	5 May 2007	Austrian Championships	Öblarn, Austria	
–58 kg
Snatch	78 kg	Heidi Neubacher	31 March 2007			
Clean & Jerk	100 kg	Heidi Neubacher	10 May 2003	Hungary Grand Prix	Hungary	
Total	174 kg	Heidi Neubacher	31 March 2007			
–63 kg
Snatch	76 kg	Heidi Neubacher	25 November 2006			
Clean & Jerk	101 kg	Heidi Neubacher	25 November 2006			
Total	177 kg	Heidi Neubacher	25 November 2006			
–69 kg
Snatch	85 kg	Victoria Hahn	30 March 2018	European Championships	Bucharest, Romania	
Clean & Jerk	102 kg	Victoria Hahn	8 December 2016	European U23 Championships	Eilat, Israel	
Total	185 kg	Victoria Hahn	8 December 2016	European U23 Championships	Eilat, Israel	
–75 kg
Snatch	91 kg	Victoria Hahn	26 May 2018			
Clean & Jerk	107 kg	Sarah Fischer	10 June 2016	Austrian Championships	Schrems, Austria	
Total	195 kg	Victoria Hahn	26 May 2018			
–90 kg
Snatch	101 kg	Sarah Fischer	31 March 2018	European Championships	Bucharest, Romania	
Clean & Jerk	126 kg	Sarah Fischer	16 June 2018		Innsbruck, Austria	
Total	226 kg	Sarah Fischer	31 March 2018	European Championships	Bucharest, Romania	
+90 kg
Snatch	97 kg	Standard				
Clean & Jerk	118 kg	Standard				
Total	215 kg	Standard				
