= Weightlifting at the 2017 Summer Universiade – Men's 105 kg =

Men's 105 kg at the Universiade
- Venues: Tamkang University Shao-Mo Memorial Gymnasium 7F
- Dates: 24 August 2017
- Competitors: 18 from 13 nations

Medalists
1st place, gold medalist(s)		Simon Martirosyan	Armenia
2nd place, silver medalist(s)		Kia Ghadami	Iran
3rd place, bronze medalist(s)		Resul Elvan	Turkey

The men's 105 kg event at the 2017 Summer Universiade was held on 24 August at the Tamkang University Shao-Mo Memorial Gymnasium 7F.

== Records ==
Prior to this competition, the existing world and Universiade records were as follows.

- Initial records

Category		Nation	Athlete	Record	Place	Date	Meet
World record	Snatch	Belarus	Andrei Aramnau	200 kg	Beijing, China	18 August 2008	2008 Summer Olympics
World record	Clean & Jerk	Kazakhstan	Ilya Ilyin	246 kg	Grozny, Russia	12 December 2015	2015 President's Cup
World record	Total	Kazakhstan	Ilya Ilyin	437 kg	Grozny, Russia	12 December 2015	2015 President's Cup
Universiade records	Snatch	Uzbekistan (UZB)	Ruslan Nurudinov	190 kg	Kazan, Russia	12 July 2013	2013 Summer Universiade
Universiade records	Clean & Jerk	Russia (RUS)	David Bedzhanyan	224 kg	Kazan, Russia	12 July 2013	2013 Summer Universiade
Universiade records	Total	Uzbekistan (UZB)	Ruslan Nurudinov	412 kg	Kazan, Russia	12 July 2013	2013 Summer Universiade

== Results ==
Rank	Athlete	Group	Body weight	Snatch (kg)				Clean & Jerk (kg)				Total
Rank	Athlete	Group	Body weight	1	2	3	Result	1	2	3	Result	Total
1st place, gold medalist(s)	Simon Martirosyan (ARM)	A	104.90	180	~~192~~	~~192~~	180	~~220~~	221	~~233~~	221	401
2nd place, silver medalist(s)	Kia Ghadami (IRI)	A	104.06	166	~~170~~	170	170	203	211	~~222~~	211	381
3rd place, bronze medalist(s)	Resul Elvan (TUR)	A	104.79	160	165	~~167~~	165	200	~~209~~	~~209~~	200	365
4	Milad Rahbarinejad (IRI)	A	104.73	160	~~165~~	~~166~~	160	193	~~206~~	~~206~~	193	353
5	Tinnaphop Kanrawangchai (THA)	A	104.36	150	155	~~158~~	155	187	191	~~195~~	191	346
6	Sergej Lichovoj (LTU)	A	104.80	158	~~164~~	~~164~~	158	187	~~192~~	~~192~~	187	345
7	Lee Hao-jan (TPE)	A	104.84	~~150~~	150	~~156~~	150	~~190~~	190	~~200~~	190	340
8	Jiří Gasior (CZE)	A	104.29	147	150	~~153~~	150	184	189	~~192~~	189	339
9	Jacob William Baker (USA)	A	103.79	148	153	~~155~~	153	175	180	185	185	338
10	Tomas Li-cin-chai (LTU)	B	98.95	145	151	~~155~~	151	175	182	~~188~~	182	333
11	David Vincent Samayoa (CAN)	B	94.44	148	~~152~~	152	152	~~170~~	170	~~176~~	170	322
12	Drake Edwin Thompson (USA)	B	104.36	135	140	~~143~~	140	~~175~~	175	~~180~~	175	315
13	Alexandre Caza (CAN)	B	102.07	137	~~142~~	~~142~~	137	158	164	~~170~~	164	301
14	Joshua Thomas Quinn (AUS)	B	104.81	120	~~127~~	127	127	150	~~160~~	~~165~~	150	277
15	Mathias C. Lindhardt (DEN)	B	102.53	~~120~~	120	127	127	140	146	~~151~~	146	273
16	Ali Javed (PAK)	B	99.72	115	120	~~125~~	120	135	–	–	135	255
17	Patrik Krywult (CZE)	A	104.21	150	154	~~156~~	154	~~175~~	–	–	–	–
DSQ	Rodion Bochkov (RUS)	A	104.25	170	175	180	180	200	210	~~220~~	210	390
