= 2013 World Weightlifting Championships – Men's 105 kg =

The men's competition in the –105 kg division was held on 26–27 October 2013 in Centennial Hall, Wrocław, Poland.

== Schedule ==
Date	Time	Event
26 October 2013	10:00	Group C
26 October 2013	14:00	Group B
27 October 2013	12:55	Group A

== Medalists ==
Event	Gold		Silver		Bronze	
Snatch	Ruslan Nurudinov (UZB)	190 kg	Bartłomiej Bonk (POL)	188 kg	Aleh Loban (BLR)	182 kg
Clean & Jerk	Ruslan Nurudinov (UZB)	235 kg	David Bedzhanyan (RUS)	225 kg	Mohammad Reza Barari (IRI)	221 kg
Total	Ruslan Nurudinov (UZB)	425 kg	David Bedzhanyan (RUS)	405 kg	Bartłomiej Bonk (POL)	404 kg

== Records ==
Prior to this competition, the existing world records were as follows.

World Record	Snatch	Andrei Aramnau (BLR)	200 kg	Beijing, China	18 August 2008
World Record	Clean & Jerk	David Bedzhanyan (RUS)	238 kg	Belgorod, Russia	17 December 2011
World Record	Total	Andrei Aramnau (BLR)	436 kg	Beijing, China	18 August 2008

== Results ==
Rank	Athlete	Group	Body weight	Snatch (kg)				Clean & Jerk (kg)				Total
Rank	Athlete	Group	Body weight	1	2	3	Rank	1	2	3	Rank	Total
1st place, gold medalist(s)	Ruslan Nurudinov (UZB)	A	104.54	~~190~~	190	~~195~~	1st place, gold medalist(s)	225	230	235	1st place, gold medalist(s)	425
2nd place, silver medalist(s)	David Bedzhanyan (RUS)	A	104.70	~~180~~	180	~~185~~	5	220	225	~~236~~	2nd place, silver medalist(s)	405
3rd place, bronze medalist(s)	Bartłomiej Bonk (POL)	A	103.66	180	185	188	2nd place, silver medalist(s)	212	216	~~218~~	4	404
4	Mohammad Reza Barari (IRI)	A	104.14	171	176	~~179~~	8	212	~~221~~	221	3rd place, bronze medalist(s)	397
5	Artūrs Plēsnieks (LAT)	A	103.67	170	175	178	6	215	~~221~~	~~221~~	5	393
6	Jorge Arroyo (ECU)	A	103.64	~~182~~	~~182~~	182	4	205	210	~~215~~	8	392
7	Kia Ghadami (IRI)	A	104.09	173	~~178~~	~~179~~	9	210	~~216~~	~~216~~	9	383
8	Iskander Mominbekov (KAZ)	A	102.57	172	~~177~~	~~177~~	10	210	~~215~~	~~215~~	6	382
9	David Kavelasvili (GRE)	B	103.37	168	~~172~~	172	11	205	~~210~~	210	7	382
10	Ferenc Gyurkovics (HUN)	B	104.66	170	175	178	7	195	202	~~206~~	11	380
11	Modestas Šimkus (LTU)	B	103.98	170	~~175~~	~~175~~	12	190	200	~~210~~	12	370
12	Sardorbek Dusmurotov (UZB)	B	104.23	155	~~160~~	160	16	205	~~215~~	~~215~~	10	365
13	David Garcia (USA)	C	103.50	150	155	160	15	190	~~196~~	196	13	356
14	Jesús González (VEN)	C	98.45	155	160	~~165~~	13	195	~~200~~	~~200~~	14	355
15	Mateus Gregório (BRA)	B	102.71	160	~~165~~	~~165~~	14	~~192~~	192	~~197~~	15	352
16	Kévin Bouly (FRA)	C	104.56	151	~~156~~	~~156~~	18	186	191	~~200~~	16	342
17	Hiroaki Shiraishi (JPN)	C	102.54	140	145	150	19	170	180	190	17	340
18	Ivan Biočić (CRO)	C	97.80	110	115	~~120~~	20	130	135	~~140~~	18	250
—	Aleh Loban (BLR)	A	103.62	178	182	~~186~~	3rd place, bronze medalist(s)	~~215~~	~~215~~	~~216~~	—	—
—	Donovan Ford (USA)	B	104.46	155	~~160~~	160	17	—	—	—	—	—
—	Marcin Dołęga (POL)	A	104.42	~~185~~	~~185~~	~~185~~	—	—	—	—	—	—
