= 2017 World Weightlifting Championships – Men's 105 kg =

The Men's 105 kg competition at the 2017 World Weightlifting Championships was held on 4 December 2017.

== Schedule ==
| Date | Time | Event |
|---|---|---|
| 4 December 2017 | 10:55 | Group B |
| 4 December 2017 | 17:25 | Group A |

== Medalists ==
| Event | Gold | | Silver | | Bronze | |
|---|---|---|---|---|---|---|
| Snatch | Ali Hashemi (IRI) | 183 kg | Ivan Efremov (UZB) | 182 kg | Jorge Arroyo (ECU) | 181 kg |
| Clean & Jerk | Seo Hui-yeop (KOR) | 222 kg | Artūrs Plēsnieks (LAT) | 222 kg | Ali Hashemi (IRI) | 221 kg |
| Total | Ali Hashemi (IRI) | 404 kg | Artūrs Plēsnieks (LAT) | 402 kg | Ivan Efremov (UZB) | 399 kg |

== Records ==
Prior to this competition, the existing world records were as follows.

| World Record | Snatch | Andrei Aramnau (BLR) | 200 kg | Beijing, China | 18 August 2008 |
| World Record | Clean & Jerk | Ilya Ilyin (KAZ) | 246 kg | Grozny, Russia | 12 December 2015 |
| World Record | Total | Ilya Ilyin (KAZ) | 437 kg | Grozny, Russia | 12 December 2015 |

== Results ==
| Rank | Athlete | Group | Snatch (kg) | | | | Clean & Jerk (kg) | | | | Total |
| Rank | Athlete | Group | 1 | 2 | 3 | Rank | 1 | 2 | 3 | Rank | Total |
|---|---|---|---|---|---|---|---|---|---|---|---|
| 1st place, gold medalist(s) | Ali Hashemi (IRI) | A | 178 | 183 | ~~186~~ | 1st place, gold medalist(s) | 215 | ~~221~~ | 221 | 3rd place, bronze medalist(s) | 404 |
| 2nd place, silver medalist(s) | Artūrs Plēsnieks (LAT) | A | ~~176~~ | 176 | 180 | 4 | 217 | ~~221~~ | 222 | 2nd place, silver medalist(s) | 402 |
| 3rd place, bronze medalist(s) | Ivan Efremov (UZB) | A | 182 | ~~186~~ | ~~186~~ | 2nd place, silver medalist(s) | 210 | ~~215~~ | 217 | 5 | 399 |
| 4 | Seo Hui-yeop (KOR) | A | 172 | ~~177~~ | ~~177~~ | 14 | 216 | 222 | ~~228~~ | 1st place, gold medalist(s) | 394 |
| 5 | Arkadiusz Michalski (POL) | A | 173 | ~~176~~ | ~~176~~ | 13 | 220 | ~~227~~ | ~~227~~ | 4 | 393 |
| 6 | Vasil Gospodinov (BUL) | A | ~~175~~ | ~~176~~ | 178 | 8 | ~~214~~ | 214 | ~~220~~ | 7 | 392 |
| 7 | Alireza Soleimani (IRI) | A | 177 | ~~183~~ | ~~184~~ | 9 | 215 | ~~222~~ | ~~223~~ | 6 | 392 |
| 8 | Marcos Ruiz (ESP) | B | 170 | 177 | 180 | 6 | 200 | 211 | ~~215~~ | 8 | 391 |
| 9 | Jin Yun-seong (KOR) | A | ~~176~~ | ~~176~~ | 180 | 5 | 207 | ~~215~~ | ~~215~~ | 12 | 387 |
| 10 | Wes Kitts (USA) | A | 165 | ~~172~~ | 176 | 11 | ~~202~~ | 203 | 210 | 10 | 386 |
| 11 | Sargis Martirosjan (AUT) | A | 178 | ~~182~~ | ~~184~~ | 7 | 203 | ~~208~~ | ~~210~~ | 13 | 381 |
| 12 | Jorge Arroyo (ECU) | B | 173 | 178 | 181 | 3rd place, bronze medalist(s) | 192 | ~~197~~ | ~~197~~ | 20 | 373 |
| 13 | Akbar Djuraev (UZB) | B | 164 | 169 | 174 | 12 | 194 | 199 | ~~203~~ | 15 | 373 |
| 14 | Ryunosuke Mochida (JPN) | A | ~~165~~ | ~~165~~ | 165 | 16 | 208 | ~~217~~ | ~~218~~ | 11 | 373 |
| 15 | Ian Wilson (USA) | A | 165 | ~~171~~ | ~~172~~ | 15 | 202 | ~~210~~ | ~~211~~ | 14 | 367 |
| 16 | Hernán Viera (PER) | B | 145 | ~~150~~ | ~~150~~ | 25 | 197 | 205 | 211 | 9 | 356 |
| 17 | Arnas Šidiškis (LTU) | B | 154 | 160 | ~~165~~ | 17 | 191 | ~~195~~ | ~~195~~ | 21 | 351 |
| 18 | Hiroaki Shiraishi (JPN) | B | 155 | ~~160~~ | ~~160~~ | 18 | 195 | ~~205~~ | ~~205~~ | 17 | 350 |
| 19 | Pardeep Singh (IND) | B | 145 | 149 | 153 | 21 | 188 | 196 | ~~201~~ | 16 | 349 |
| 20 | Jiří Gasior (CZE) | B | 150 | 153 | ~~156~~ | 19 | 190 | ~~195~~ | 195 | 18 | 348 |
| 21 | Hsieh Wei-chun (TPE) | B | ~~153~~ | 153 | ~~159~~ | 20 | ~~193~~ | ~~193~~ | 194 | 19 | 347 |
| 22 | Tomas Li-čin-chai (LTU) | B | ~~150~~ | 150 | ~~156~~ | 22 | 180 | 187 | 191 | 22 | 341 |
| 23 | Owen Boxall (GBR) | B | 147 | ~~151~~ | ~~151~~ | 24 | 180 | 185 | ~~190~~ | 24 | 332 |
| 24 | Richmond Osarfo (GHA) | B | ~~138~~ | 138 | 142 | 26 | 181 | 186 | 190 | 23 | 332 |
| 25 | Mikkel Andersen (DEN) | B | 143 | 148 | ~~152~~ | 23 | 175 | ~~180~~ | 182 | 25 | 330 |
| — | Salwan Jasim (IRQ) | A | ~~177~~ | ~~177~~ | 177 | 10 | ~~217~~ | ~~217~~ | ~~221~~ | — | — |
| — | Leho Pent (EST) | B | ~~158~~ | — | — | — | — | — | — | — | — |
