= Weightlifting at the 2014 Asian Games – Men's 105 kg =

Men's 105 kg at the 2014 Asian Games
- Venue: Moonlight Festival Garden Venue
- Date: 25–26 September 2014
- Competitors: 14 from 12 nations

Medalists
gold medal	Yang Zhe	China
silver medal	Kim Min-jae	South Korea
bronze medal	Sardorbek Dusmurotov	Uzbekistan

The men's 105 kilograms event at the 2014 Asian Games took place on 25 and 26 September 2014 at Moonlight Festival Garden Weightlifting Venue.

== Schedule ==
All times are Korea Standard Time (UTC+09:00)

Date	Time	Event
Thursday, 25 September 2014	14:00	Group B
Friday, 26 September 2014	13:00	Group A

== Records ==
Prior to this competition, the existing world, Asian and Games records were as follows.

World Record	Snatch	Andrei Aramnau (BLR)	200 kg	Beijing, China	18 August 2008
World Record	Clean & Jerk	David Bedzhanyan (RUS)	238 kg	Belgorod, Russia	17 December 2011
World Record	Total	Andrei Aramnau (BLR)	436 kg	Beijing, China	18 August 2008
Asian Record	Snatch	Cui Wenhua (CHN)	195 kg	Lahti, Finland	14 November 1998
Asian Record	Clean & Jerk	Hossein Tavakkoli (IRI)	235 kg	Sydney, Australia	25 September 2000
Asian Record	Total	Hossein Tavakkoli (IRI)	425 kg	Sydney, Australia	25 September 2000
Games Record	Snatch	Cui Wenhua (CHN)	195 kg	Bangkok, Thailand	13 December 1998
Games Record	Clean & Jerk	Said Saif Asaad (QAT)	225 kg	Busan, South Korea	9 October 2002
Games Record	Total	Said Saif Asaad (QAT)	417 kg	Busan, South Korea	9 October 2002

== Results ==
Legend

- NM — No mark

Rank	Athlete	Group	Body weight	Snatch (kg)				Clean & Jerk (kg)				Total
Rank	Athlete	Group	Body weight	1	2	3	Result	1	2	3	Result	Total
1st place, gold medalist(s)	Yang Zhe (CHN)	A	104.28	186	~~191~~	~~191~~	186	217	~~221~~	~~230~~	217	403
2nd place, silver medalist(s)	Kim Min-jae (KOR)	A	102.85	177	~~182~~	182	182	210	215	~~221~~	215	397
3rd place, bronze medalist(s)	Sardorbek Dusmurotov (UZB)	A	104.40	160	165	170	170	215	221	~~228~~	221	391
4	Salwan Jasim (IRQ)	A	104.53	177	181	~~184~~	181	210	~~217~~	~~217~~	210	391
5	Ahed Joughili (SYR)	A	104.56	~~165~~	165	~~171~~	165	200	~~210~~	210	210	375
6	Hsieh Wei-chun (TPE)	B	102.45	153	160	164	164	200	209	~~212~~	209	373
7	Hiroaki Shiraishi (JPN)	B	103.85	157	162	~~165~~	162	200	205	~~210~~	205	367
8	Ali Jadid (SYR)	B	104.22	160	~~165~~	~~165~~	160	190	200	~~208~~	200	360
9	Ryunosuke Mochida (JPN)	B	103.07	~~157~~	157	~~163~~	157	200	~~204~~	~~205~~	200	357
10	Abdullah Al-Shamrani (KSA)	B	104.49	135	139	144	144	166	173	~~176~~	173	317
11	Haroon Shukat (PAK)	B	104.93	140	145	~~147~~	145	167	~~173~~	~~173~~	167	312
12	Tümendembereliin Tümenbaatar (MGL)	B	104.03	125	130	~~135~~	130	150	160	~~170~~	160	290
—	Navab Nassirshalal (IRI)	A	104.20	176	181	~~184~~	181	~~217~~	~~219~~	~~219~~	—	NM
—	Sergey Istomin (KAZ)	A	104.19	175	~~180~~	180	180	~~210~~	~~211~~	~~211~~	—	NM
