= Weightlifting at the 2012 Summer Olympics – Men's 105 kg =

Men's 105 kg at the Games of the XXX Olympiad
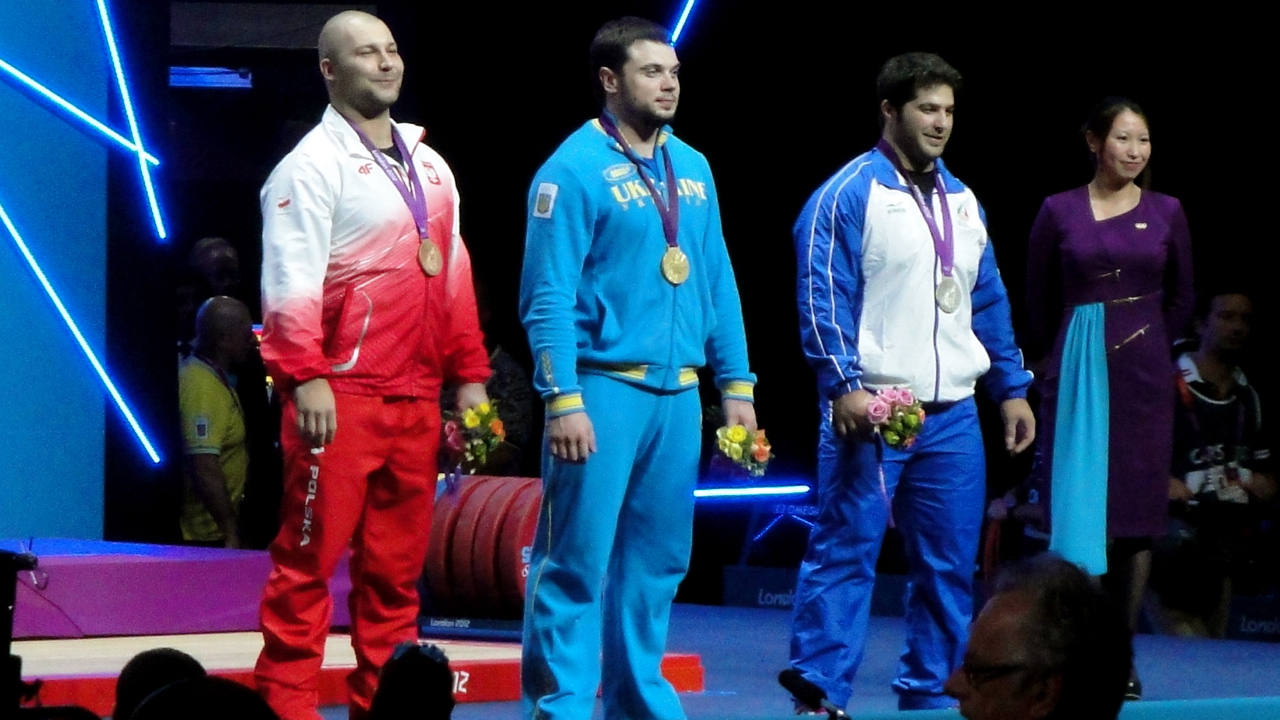
- Left to right: Bonk, Torokhtiy and Nassirshalal
- Venue: ExCeL London
- Date: 6 August 2012
- Competitors: 17 from 14 nations

Medalists
1st place, gold medalist(s)		Navab Nassirshalal	Iran
2nd place, silver medalist(s)		Bartłomiej Bonk	Poland
3rd place, bronze medalist(s)		Ivan Efremov	Uzbekistan

The men's 105 kilograms weightlifting event at the 2012 Summer Olympics in London, United Kingdom, took place at ExCeL London.

== Summary ==
Total score was the sum of the lifter's best result in each of the snatch and the clean and jerk, with three lifts allowed for each lift. In case of a tie, the lighter lifter won; if still tied, the lifter who took the fewest attempts to achieve the total score won. Lifters without a valid snatch score did not perform the clean and jerk.

Russia's Khadzhimurat Akkaev and Dmitry Klokov were on the start list but did not compete. Akkaev later failed a drug test, and it was suggested that they did not compete to cover-up their use of performance enhancing drugs.

On 22 December 2018, it was announced that Ukraine's Oleksiy Torokhtiy, who had originally been the gold medalist, and Uzbek Ruslan Nurudinov, who had originally finished fourth, had tested positive for performance-enhancing drugs.

In May 2019, Nurudinov was disqualified, and in December 2019, Torokhtiy was also disqualified. Medals were reallocated.

== Schedule ==
All times are British Summer Time (UTC+01:00)

Date	Time	Event
6 August 2012	15:30	Group B
6 August 2012	19:00	Group A

== Records ==
{{{caption}}}
World Record	Snatch	Andrei Aramnau (BLR)	200 kg	Beijing, China	18 August 2008
World Record	Clean & Jerk	David Bedzhanyan (RUS)	238 kg	Belgorod, Russia	17 December 2011
World Record	Total	Andrei Aramnau (BLR)	436 kg	Beijing, China	18 August 2008
Olympic Record	Snatch	Andrei Aramnau (BLR)	200 kg	Beijing, China	18 August 2008
Olympic Record	Clean & Jerk	Andrei Aramnau (BLR)	236 kg	Beijing, China	18 August 2008
Olympic Record	Total	Andrei Aramnau (BLR)	436 kg	Beijing, China	18 August 2008

== Results ==
Rank	Athlete	Group	Body weight	Snatch (kg)				Clean & Jerk (kg)				Total
Rank	Athlete	Group	Body weight	1	2	3	Result	1	2	3	Result	Total
1st place, gold medalist(s)	Navab Nassirshalal (IRI)	A	104.41	~~183~~	~~183~~	184	184	222	227	~~229~~	227	411
2nd place, silver medalist(s)	Bartłomiej Bonk (POL)	A	104.01	185	188	190	190	~~219~~	220	~~225~~	220	410
3rd place, bronze medalist(s)	Ivan Efremov (UZB)	A	103.83	175	179	183	183	213	218	~~225~~	218	401
4	Ahed Joughili (SYR)	A	104.98	172	180	~~184~~	180	~~215~~	218	~~225~~	218	398
5	Artūrs Plēsnieks (LAT)	B	103.69	167	171	175	175	208	215	~~225~~	215	390
6	Jorge Arroyo (ECU)	B	103.96	175	180	185	185	~~200~~	200	~~208~~	200	385
7	Jürgen Spieß (GER)	B	104.45	167	172	~~175~~	172	197	202	~~214~~	202	374
8	Serhiy Tahirov (UKR)	B	104.72	166	171	174	174	200	~~207~~	~~208~~	200	374
9	Martin Tešovič (SVK)	B	104.19	162	167	~~170~~	167	190	~~196~~	196	196	363
10	Alexandr Zaichikov (KAZ)	B	94.74	155	~~165~~	~~165~~	155	195	201	205	205	360
11	Jorge García (CHI)	B	104.41	~~150~~	150	~~161~~	150	~~191~~	~~191~~	191	191	341
12	Walid Bidani (ALG)	B	101.45	~~160~~	160	~~165~~	160	~~180~~	~~180~~	180	180	340
—	Gia Machavariani (GEO)	A	103.86	~~185~~	~~185~~	185	185	~~220~~	~~220~~	~~225~~	—	—
—	Kim Hwa-seung (KOR)	A	104.55	~~178~~	~~178~~	~~178~~	—	—	—	—	—	—
—	Marcin Dołęga (POL)	A	104.01	~~190~~	~~190~~	~~190~~	—	—	—	—	—	—
DQ	Oleksiy Torokhtiy (UKR)	A	104.31	185	~~190~~	~~190~~	185	222	~~226~~	227	227	~~412~~
DQ	Ruslan Nurudinov (UZB)	A	102.04	184	~~188~~	~~190~~	184	220	~~226~~	~~226~~	220	~~404~~
