= Chile at the 2012 Summer Olympics =

- IOC code: CHI
- NOC: Chilean Olympic Committee
- Website: www.coch.cl (in Spanish)

in London
- Competitors: 35 in 17 sports
- Flag bearers: Denisse van Lamoen (opening); Paris Inostroza (closing)
- Medals: Gold 0 Silver 0 Bronze 0 Total 0

Summer Olympics appearances (overview)
- ~~1896~~; 1900–1908; 1912; 1920; 1924; 1928; 1932; 1936; 1948; 1952; 1956; 1960; 1964; 1968; 1972; 1976; 1980; 1984; 1988; 1992; 1996; 2000; 2004; 2008; 2012; 2016; 2020; 2024; 2028

Chile competed at the 2012 Summer Olympics in London, from 27 July to 12 August 2012. This nation has competed at every Olympic Games, except the 1932 Summer Olympics in Los Angeles, and the 1980 Summer Olympics in Moscow because of the United States boycott.

The Chile Olympic Committee (Spanish: Comité Olímpico de Chile, COCH) sent a total of 35 athletes to the Games, 21 men and 14 women, to compete in 17 sports. There was only a single competitor in track cycling, judo, modern pentathlon, rowing, shooting, swimming and taekwondo. Among the sports played by the athletes, Chile made its Olympics debut in artistic gymnastics and Greco-Roman wrestling. The Chilean team featured six athletes who competed at their fourth Olympics: archer Denisse van Lamoen, épée fencer Paris Inostroza, table tennis player Berta Rodríguez and three of its oldest members from the equestrian jumping team. Van Lamoen was also appointed by the committee to carry the nation's flag at the opening ceremony.

With poor athletic performance and the absence of tennis players in the team, Chile failed to win a single medal for the first time in Olympic history since 1996. Gymnast Tomás González missed out on an Olympic medal in London, after finishing fourth in men's floor and vault exercises.

== Archery ==
Chile has qualified one archer for the women's individual event.

Athlete	Event	Ranking round		Round of 64	Round of 32	Round of 16	Quarterfinals	Semifinals	Final / BM	
Athlete	Event	Score	Seed	Opposition Score	Opposition Score	Opposition Score	Opposition Score	Opposition Score	Opposition Score	Rank
Denisse van Lamoen	Women's individual	645	31	Esebua (GEO) (34); L 0–6	Did not advance					

== Athletics ==
Chilean athletes have so far achieved qualifying standards in the following athletics events (up to a maximum of 3 athletes in each event at the 'A' Standard, and 1 at the 'B' Standard):

Key

- Note – Ranks given for track events are within the athlete's heat only
- Q = Qualified for the next round
- q = Qualified for the next round as a fastest loser or, in field events, by position without achieving the qualifying target
- NR = National record
- N/A = Round not applicable for the event
- Bye = Athlete not required to compete in round

Men
Track & road events

Athlete	Event	Heat		Semifinal		Final	
Athlete	Event	Result	Rank	Result	Rank	Result	Rank
Edward Araya	50 km walk	—N/a				DSQ	
Yerko Araya	20 km walk	—N/a				1:25:27 SB	41
Cristian Reyes	200 m	21.29	7	Did not advance			

Combined events – Decathlon

Athlete	Event	100 m	LJ	SP	HJ	400 m	110H	DT	PV	JT	1500 m	Final	Rank
Gonzalo Barroilhet	Result	11.18	6.80	14.49	2.05	51.07	14.12	41.27	5.40	57.25	4:48.23	7972	13
Gonzalo Barroilhet	Points	821	767	758	850	766	959	690	1035	697	629	7972	13

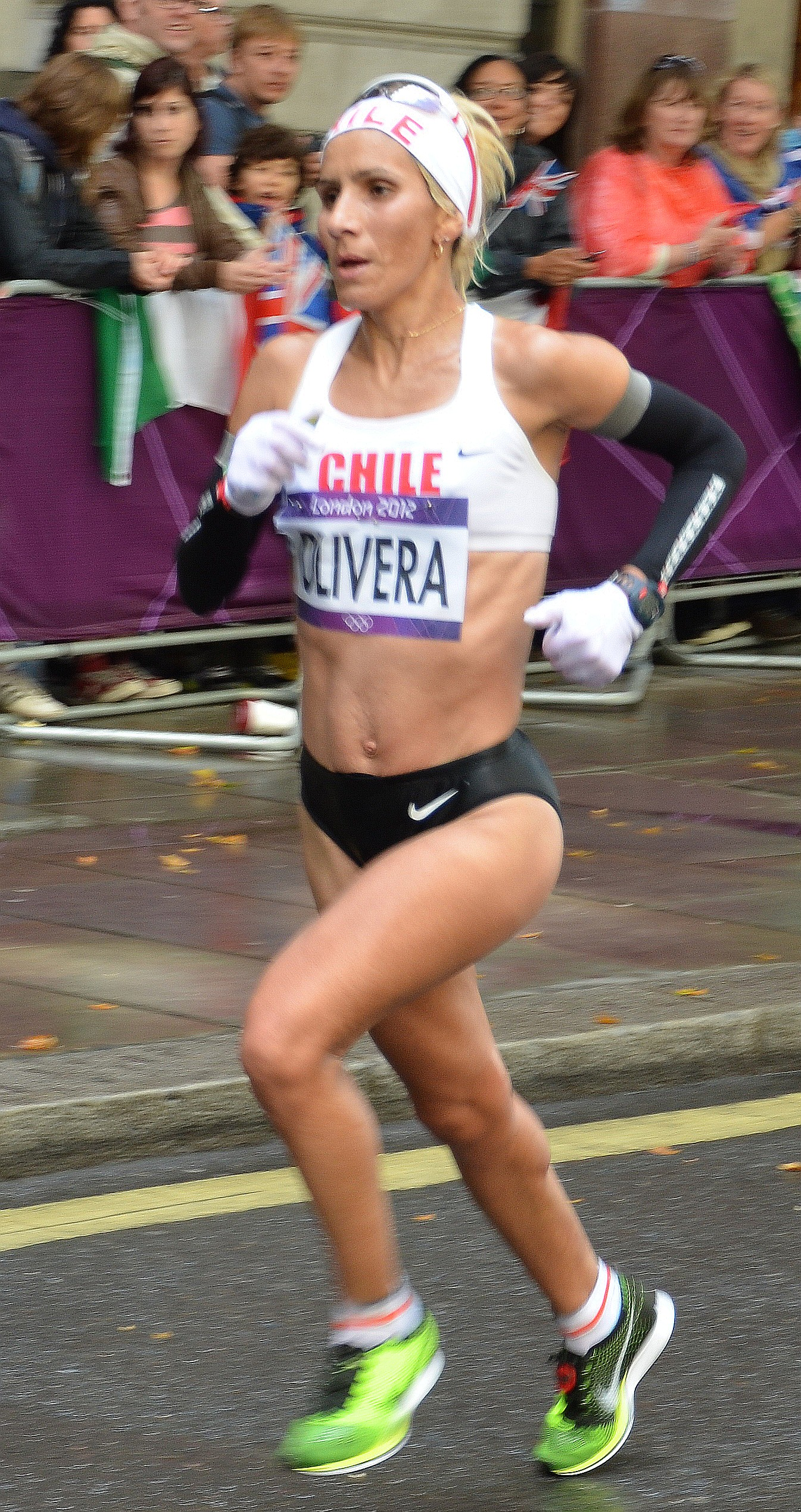
Érika Olivera in women's marathon

Women
Track & road events

Athlete	Event	Final	
Athlete	Event	Result	Rank
Érika Olivera	Marathon	2:36:41	64
Natalia Romero	Marathon	2:37:47	69

Field events

Athlete	Event	Qualification		Final	
Athlete	Event	Distance	Position	Distance	Position
Natalia Duco	Shot put	18.45	12 q	18.80	7
Karen Gallardo	Discus throw	60.09	21	Did not advance	

== Cycling ==
Chile had qualified a quota place in the men's road race after Gonzalo Garrido finished second at the 2011 American Championships, and in the men's omnium.

=== Road ===
Athlete	Event	Time	Rank
Gonzalo Garrido	Men's road race	5:46:37	72
Paola Muñoz	Women's road race	Did not finish	

=== Track ===
Omnium

Athlete	Event	Flying lap		Points race		Elimination race	Individual pursuit		Scratch race	Time trial		Total points	Rank
Athlete	Event	Time	Rank	Points	Rank	Rank	Time	Rank	Rank	Time	Rank	Total points	Rank
Luis Mansilla	Men's omnium	14.270	18	−40	18	16	4:53.23	18	16	1:08.517	18	104	18

== Equestrian ==
Chile has qualified 4 riders.

=== Jumping ===
Athlete	Horse	Event	Qualification								Final					Total	
Athlete	Horse	Event	Round 1		Round 2			Round 3			Round A		Round B			Total	
Athlete	Horse	Event	Penalties	Rank	Penalties	Total	Rank	Penalties	Total	Rank	Penalties	Rank	Penalties	Total	Rank	Penalties	Rank
Rodrigo Carrasco	Or De La Charboniere	Individual	5	=53 Q	17	22	61	Did not advance								22	61
Tomas Couve Correa	Underwraps	Individual	6	=58 Q	5	11	=53	Did not advance								11	=53
Carlos Milthaler	Hyo Altanero	Individual	4	=42 Q	8	12	=56	Did not advance								12	=56
Samuel Parot	Al Calypso	Individual	8	=60 Q	9	17	59	Did not advance								17	59
Rodrigo Carrasco; Tomas Couve Correa; Carlos Milthaler; Samuel Parot	See above	Team	—N/a								22	15	Did not advance			22	15

== Fencing ==
Chile has qualified 2 fencers.

Men

Athlete	Event	Round of 32	Round of 16	Quarterfinal	Semifinal	Final / BM	
Athlete	Event	Opposition Score	Opposition Score	Opposition Score	Opposition Score	Opposition Score	Rank
Paris Inostroza	Individual épée	Heinzer (SUI); L 2–15	Did not advance				

Women

Athlete	Event	Round of 64	Round of 32	Round of 16	Quarterfinal	Semifinal	Final / BM	
Athlete	Event	Opposition Score	Opposition Score	Opposition Score	Opposition Score	Opposition Score	Opposition Score	Rank
Cáterin Bravo	Individual épée	Lawrence (GBR); L 12–15	Did not advance					

== Gymnastics ==
=== Artistic ===
Men

Athlete	Event	Qualification								Final							
Athlete	Event	Apparatus						Total	Rank	Apparatus						Total	Rank
Athlete	Event	F	PH	R	V	PB	HB	Total	Rank	F	PH	R	V	PB	HB	Total	Rank
Tomás González	Floor	15.533	—N/a					15.533	6 Q	15.366	—N/a					15.366	4
Tomás González	Vault	—N/a			16.433	—N/a		16.433	3 Q	—N/a			16.183	—N/a		16.183	4

Women

Athlete	Event	Qualification						Final					
Athlete	Event	Apparatus				Total	Rank	Apparatus				Total	Rank
Athlete	Event	F	V	UB	BB	Total	Rank	F	V	UB	BB	Total	Rank
Simona Castro	All-around	12.600	13.666	12.266	12.400	50.932	43	Did not advance					

== Judo ==
Athlete	Event	Round of 64	Round of 32	Round of 16	Quarterfinals	Semifinals	Repechage	Final / BM	
Athlete	Event	Opposition Result	Opposition Result	Opposition Result	Opposition Result	Opposition Result	Opposition Result	Opposition Result	Rank
Alejandro Zuñiga	Men's −66 kg	Bye	Shavdatuashvili (GEO); L 0002–0101	Did not advance					

== Modern pentathlon ==
Esteban Bustos has qualified for the Olympics, after winning the bronze medal at the 2011 Pan American Games in Guadalajara, Mexico.

Athlete	Event	Fencing (épée one touch)			Swimming (200 m freestyle)			Riding (show jumping)			Combined: shooting/running (10 m air pistol)/(3000 m)			Total points	Final rank
Athlete	Event	Results	Rank	MP points	Time	Rank	MP points	Penalties	Rank	MP points	Time	Rank	MP Points	Total points	Final rank
Esteban Bustos	Men's	15–20	=25	760	2:10.52	27	1236	40	10	1160	10:38.72	10	2448	5604	18

== Rowing ==
Chile has qualified the following boat.

Men

Athlete	Event	Heats		Repechage		Quarterfinals		Semifinals		Final	
Athlete	Event	Time	Rank	Time	Rank	Time	Rank	Time	Rank	Time	Rank
Oscar Vasquez	Single sculls	7:06.33	5 R	7:09.12	2 QF	7:24.07	5 SC/D	7:57.36	5 FD	7:36.79	23

Qualification Legend: FA=Final A (medal); FB=Final B (non-medal); FC=Final C (non-medal); FD=Final D (non-medal); FE=Final E (non-medal); FF=Final F (non-medal); SA/B=Semifinals A/B; SC/D=Semifinals C/D; SE/F=Semifinals E/F; QF=Quarterfinals; R=Repechage

== Sailing ==
Chile has so far qualified 2 boat for each of the following events

Men

Athlete	Event	Race											Net points	Final rank
Athlete	Event	1	2	3	4	5	6	7	8	9	10	M*	Net points	Final rank
Matías del Solar	Laser	16	32	25	43	20	17	~~BFD~~	29	44	29	EL	255	25
Diego González; Benjamín Grez	470	~~25~~	21	23	23	25	18	18	23	20	25	EL	196	27

M = Medal race; EL = Eliminated – did not advance into the medal race

== Shooting ==
Francisca Crovetto has ensured a berth in the women's skeet event.

Women

Athlete	Event	Qualification		Final	
Athlete	Event	Points	Rank	Points	Rank
Francisca Crovetto	Skeet	66	8	Did not advance	

== Swimming ==
Swimmers have so far achieved qualifying standards in the following events (up to a maximum of 2 swimmers in each event at the Olympic Qualifying Time (OQT), and potentially 1 at the Olympic Selection Time (OST)):

Women

Athlete	Event	Heat		Final	
Athlete	Event	Time	Rank	Time	Rank
Kristel Köbrich	400 m freestyle	4:12.02	24	Did not advance	
Kristel Köbrich	800 m freestyle	8:29.55	14	Did not advance	

== Table tennis ==
Chile has qualified 1 athlete.

Athlete	Event	Preliminary round	Round 1	Round 2	Round 3	Round 4	Quarterfinals	Semifinals	Final / BM	
Athlete	Event	Opposition Result	Opposition Result	Opposition Result	Opposition Result	Opposition Result	Opposition Result	Opposition Result	Opposition Result	Rank
Berta Rodríguez	Women's singles	Bye	Tian Y (CRO); L 0–4	Did not advance						

== Taekwondo ==
Chile has qualified one woman.

Athlete	Event	Round of 16	Quarterfinals	Semifinals	Repechage	Bronze Medal	Final	
Athlete	Event	Opposition Result	Opposition Result	Opposition Result	Opposition Result	Opposition Result	Opposition Result	Rank
Yeny Contreras Loyola	Women's −57 kg	Harnois (FRA); L 3–14 PTG	Did not advance					

== Triathlon ==
Chile has qualified two athletes.

Athlete	Event	Swim (1.5 km)	Trans 1	Bike (40 km)	Trans 2	Run (10 km)	Total Time	Rank
Felipe Van de Wyngard	Men's	18:53	0:41	58:52	0:33	34:03	1:53:02	50
Bárbara Riveros	Women's	19:44	0:38	1:07:03	0:35	34:15	2:02:15	16

== Weightlifting ==
Chile has qualified 1 woman and 1 man.

Athlete	Event	Snatch		Clean & Jerk		Total	Rank
Athlete	Event	Result	Rank	Result	Rank	Total	Rank
Jorge Eduardo García	Men's −105 kg	150	15	191	15	341	11
María Fernanda Valdés	Women's −75 kg	96	10	127	=8	223	6

== Wrestling ==
Chile has qualified in the following events.

Key

- VT – Victory by Fall.
- PP – Decision by Points – the loser with technical points.
- PO – Decision by Points – the loser without technical points.

Men's Greco-Roman

Athlete	Event	Qualification	Round of 16	Quarterfinal	Semifinal	Repechage 1	Repechage 2	Final / BM	
Athlete	Event	Opposition Result	Opposition Result	Opposition Result	Opposition Result	Opposition Result	Opposition Result	Opposition Result	Rank
Andrés Ayub	−120 kg	Bye	Pherselidze (GEO); L 0–3 ^{PO}	Did not advance					18

== See also ==
- Chile at the 2011 Pan American Games
