= Loban =

Loban may refer to:

- Styrax benzoin, the tree
  - Benzoin resin, the balsamic resin from the tree

== People ==
- Aleh Loban (born 1985), Belarusian weightlifter
- Dzmitry Loban (born 1981), Belarusian male cross-country skier and biathlete
- Noel Loban (born 1957), former British freestyle wrestler
- Sergey Loban (born 1972), Russian film director and editor
- Stanislav Loban (born 1977), Ukrainian footballer
- Yuliya Loban (born 2000), Ukrainian athlete competing in the combined events
