= Alexandr Zaichikov =

Belarusian-born Kazakh weightlifter (born 1992)

Personal information
- Born: 17 August 1992 (age 33) Zaslonovo, Vitebsk, Belarus
- Height: 1.80 m (5 ft 11 in)
- Weight: 105 kg (231 lb)

Sport
- Country: Kazakhstan
- Sport: Weightlifting
- Event: 105 kg
Medal record
Olympic Games
Bronze medal – third place	2016 Rio de Janeiro	– 105 kg
World Championships
Gold medal – first place	2015 Houston	–105 kg

Alexandr Zaichikov (Belarusian: Аляксандр Зайчыкаў; born 17 August 1992, in Minsk) is a Belarusian-born Kazakh weightlifter. He competed at the 2012 Summer Olympics in the –105 kg event, and in the same event at the 2016 Summer Olympics. He won a Bronze medal at the 2016 Summer Olympics.

Zaichikov was suspended for 2 years in 2013 by the International Weightlifting Federation after testing positive for Stanozolol.

== Major results ==
Year	Venue	Weight	Snatch (kg)				Clean & Jerk (kg)				Total	Rank
Year	Venue	Weight	1	2	3	Rank	1	2	3	Rank	Total	Rank
Olympic Games
2012	London, United Kingdom	105 kg	155	~~165~~	~~165~~	13	195	201	205	8	360	12
2016	Rio de Janeiro, Brazil	105 kg	185	190	193	3	223	~~227~~	~~227~~	4	416	3rd place, bronze medalist(s)
World Championships
2015	Houston, United States	105 kg	186	~~191~~	191	2nd place, silver medalist(s)	225	230	~~233~~	2nd place, silver medalist(s)	421	1st place, gold medalist(s)
2018	Ashgabat, Turkmenistan	102 kg	~~165~~	165	~~170~~	9	~~195~~	195	–	10	360	9
