= Artūrs Plēsnieks =

Latvian weightlifter (born 1992)

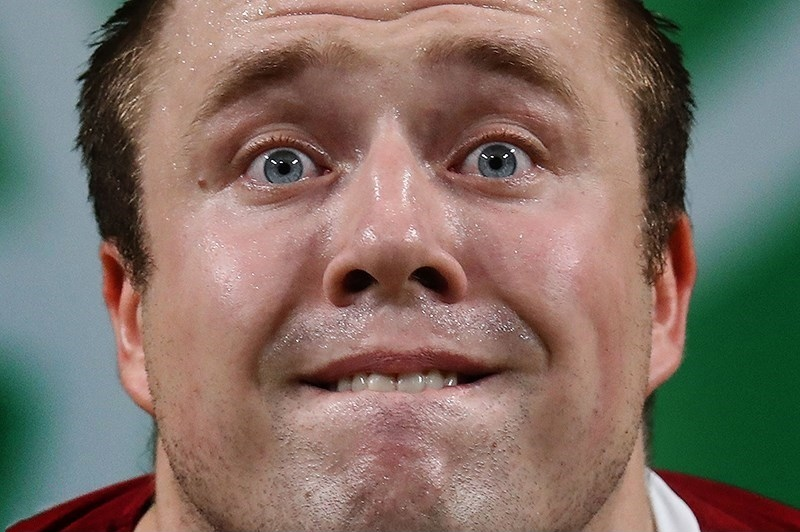
- Plēsnieks at the 2016 Summer Olympics

Personal information
- Nationality: Latvian
- Born: 21 January 1992 (age 34) Kroņauce, Tērvete, Latvia
- Height: 1.78 m (5 ft 10 in)
- Weight: 108.85 kg (240 lb)

Sport
- Country: Latvia
- Sport: Weightlifting
- Event: –109 kg

Achievements and titles
- Personal bests: Snatch: 181 kg (2016); Clean and jerk: 230 kg (2021); Total: 410 kg (2021)
Medal record
Men's weightlifting
Representing Latvia
Olympic Games
Bronze medal – third place	2020 Tokyo	–109 kg
World Championships
Silver medal – second place	2017 Anaheim	–105 kg
Bronze medal – third place	2015 Houston	–105 kg
European Championships
Gold medal – first place	2016 Forde	–105 kg
Bronze medal – third place	2013 Tirana	–105 kg

Artūrs Plēsnieks (born 21 January 1992) is a Latvian weightlifter. He has received several medals at junior competitions, including gold medal at Junior World Championships 2010 (385 kg). Plēsnieks has competed in several World Championships, and three Olympics (2012, 2016 and 2020), winning the bronze medal in the 109 kg division at the 2020 Olympics.

== Major results ==
Year	Venue	Weight	Snatch (kg)				Clean & Jerk (kg)				Total	Rank
Year	Venue	Weight	1	2	3	Rank	1	2	3	Rank	Total	Rank
Olympic Games
2012	(United Kingdom) London, England	105 kg	167	171	175	7	208	215	~~225~~	5	390	5
2016	Rio de Janeiro, Brazil	105 kg	176	~~180~~	181	8	218	~~223~~	~~225~~	9	399	8
2021	Tokyo, Japan	109 kg	175	180	~~183~~	6	220	225	230	2	410	3rd place, bronze medalist(s)
World Championships
2010	Antalya, Turkey	105 kg	~~164~~	164	~~169~~	21	208	~~214~~	~~214~~	13	372	15
2011	Paris, France	105 kg	163	~~168~~	168	16	207	212	~~216~~	13	380	14
2013	Wrocław, Poland	105 kg	170	175	178	6	215	~~221~~	~~221~~	5	393	5
2014	Almaty, Kazakhstan	105 kg	174	~~178~~	~~178~~	14	~~215~~	~~216~~	216	8	390	10
2015	Houston, United States	105 kg	175	179	~~182~~	9	217	222	226	4	405	3rd place, bronze medalist(s)
2017	Anaheim, United States	105 kg	~~176~~	176	180	4	217	~~221~~	222	2nd place, silver medalist(s)	402	2nd place, silver medalist(s)
2018	Ashgabat, Turkmenistan	109 kg	169	~~173~~	174	16	210	217	~~222~~	8	391	10
2019	Pattaya, Thailand	109 kg	173	~~178~~	~~180~~	15	215	221	~~226~~	7	394	9
