= Ryunosuke Mochida =

Japanese weightlifter (born 1993)

Personal information
- Nationality: Japan
- Born: 18 June 1993 (age 33)
- Weight: 108 kg (238 lb)

Sport
- Sport: Weightlifting
- Event: 109 kg
Medal record
Men's weightlifting
Representing Japan
Junior Asian Championships
Bronze medal – third place	2012 Yangon	105 kg
- Updated on 1 May 2019

Ryunosuke Mochida (持田 龍之介, Mochida Ryūnosuke; born 18 July 1993) is a Japanese weightlifter. His best result was the bronze medal at the 2012 Junior Asian Championship in Yangon.

== Career ==
He competed in the men's 105 kg event at the 2014 Asian Games where he finished ninth place. At the 2017 Asian Weightlifting Championships he won the bronze medal in the 105 kg snatch category, at the overall he finished fourth place.

== Major results ==
Year	Venue	Weight	Snatch (kg)				Clean & Jerk (kg)				Total	Rank
Year	Venue	Weight	1	2	3	Rank	1	2	3	Rank	Total	Rank
Representing Japan
World Championships
2019	Pattaya, Thailand	109 kg	165	170	174	12	210	219	~~223~~	10	393	10
2018	Ashgabat, Turkmenistan	109 kg	~~160~~	160	~~165~~	23	205	210	~~215~~	12	370	19
2017	Anaheim, United States	105 kg	~~165~~	~~165~~	165	16	208	~~217~~	~~218~~	11	373	14
2015	Houston, United States	105 kg	158	163	167	18	~~202~~	202	208	13	375	14
2014	Almaty, Kazakhstan	105 kg	~~156~~	~~156~~	156	31	~~189~~	189	192	29	348	28
Asian Championships
2023	Jinju, South Korea	102 kg	162	~~172~~	~~172~~	7	~~200~~	200	~~220~~	7	362	8
2021	Tashkent, Uzbekistan	109 kg	174	~~180~~	~~180~~	9	215	~~225~~	~~227~~	5	389	6
2019	Ningbo, China	109 kg	165	170	~~173~~	7	~~210~~	210	~~215~~	8	380	7
2017	Ashgabat, Turkmenistan	105 kg	161	167	172	3rd place, bronze medalist(s)	204	~~212~~	~~216~~	6	376	4
2016	Tashkent, Uzbekistan	105 kg	150	155	~~160~~	9	180	~~184~~	184	9	339	7
Asian Games
2026	Nagoya, Japan	110 kg	160	165	170	—N/a	201	206	210	—N/a	380	5
2014	Incheon, South Korea	105 kg	~~157~~	157	~~163~~	11	200	~~204~~	~~205~~	8	357	9
