= Haroon Shukat =

Pakistani weightlifter (born 1988)

Personal information
- Full name: Haroon Shukat
- Born: 29 July 1988 (age 37)
- Weight: 104.93 kg (231.3 lb)

Sport
- Country: Pakistan
- Sport: Weightlifting
- Weight class: 105 kg
- Team: National team
- Updated on 19 October 2016

Haroon Shukat (born 29 July 1988) is a Pakistani male weightlifter, competing in the 105 kg category and representing Pakistan at international competitions. He participated at the 2014 Asian Games in the 105 kg event and also at the 2014 Commonwealth Games in the 105 kg event.

== Major competitions ==
Year	Venue	Weight	Snatch (kg)				Clean & Jerk (kg)				Total	Rank
Year	Venue	Weight	1	2	3	Rank	1	2	3	Rank	Total	Rank
Asian Games
2014	Incheon, South Korea	105 kg	140	145	~~147~~	—N/a	167	~~173~~	~~173~~	—N/a	312	11
Commonwealth Games
2014	Glasgow, Scotland	105 kg	141	145	~~147~~	—N/a	~~165~~	165	167	—N/a	312	7
