= Weightlifting at the 2010 Asian Games – Men's 105 kg =

Men's 105 kg at the 2010 Asian Games
- Venue: Dongguan Arena
- Date: 19 November 2010
- Competitors: 12 from 10 nations

Medalists
gold medal	Yang Zhe	China
silver medal	Ivan Efremov	Uzbekistan
bronze medal	Sergey Istomin	Kazakhstan

The men's 105 kilograms event at the 2010 Asian Games took place on 19 November 2010 at Dongguan Arena.

== Schedule ==
All times are China Standard Time (UTC+08:00)

Date	Time	Event
Friday, 19 November 2010	10:00	Group B
Friday, 19 November 2010	14:30	Group A

== Records ==
Prior to this competition, the existing world, Asian and Games records were as follows.

World Record	Snatch	Andrei Aramnau (BLR)	200 kg	Beijing, China	18 August 2008
World Record	Clean & Jerk	Alan Tsagaev (BUL)	237 kg	Kyiv, Ukraine	25 April 2004
World Record	Total	Andrei Aramnau (BLR)	436 kg	Beijing, China	18 August 2008
Asian Record	Snatch	Cui Wenhua (CHN)	195 kg	Lahti, Finland	14 November 1998
Asian Record	Clean & Jerk	Hossein Tavakkoli (IRI)	235 kg	Sydney, Australia	25 September 2000
Asian Record	Total	Hossein Tavakkoli (IRI)	425 kg	Sydney, Australia	25 September 2000
Games Record	Snatch	Cui Wenhua (CHN)	195 kg	Bangkok, Thailand	13 December 1998
Games Record	Clean & Jerk	Said Saif Asaad (QAT)	225 kg	Busan, South Korea	9 October 2002
Games Record	Total	Said Saif Asaad (QAT)	417 kg	Busan, South Korea	9 October 2002

== Results ==
Rank	Athlete	Group	Body weight	Snatch (kg)				Clean & Jerk (kg)				Total
Rank	Athlete	Group	Body weight	1	2	3	Result	1	2	3	Result	Total
1st place, gold medalist(s)	Yang Zhe (CHN)	A	103.80	180	185	~~188~~	185	212	217	~~219~~	217	402
2nd place, silver medalist(s)	Ivan Efremov (UZB)	A	103.81	175	179	182	182	213	218	~~223~~	218	400
3rd place, bronze medalist(s)	Sergey Istomin (KAZ)	A	104.48	~~180~~	180	~~183~~	180	216	~~223~~	~~223~~	216	396
4	Kim Hwa-seung (KOR)	A	104.37	~~175~~	~~175~~	175	175	205	215	~~221~~	215	390
5	Igor Vashanov (KAZ)	B	97.73	165	170	~~175~~	170	200	205	~~210~~	205	375
6	Giyosiddin Ahmedov (UZB)	B	96.94	145	151	154	154	191	196	201	201	355
7	Khunchai Nuchpum (THA)	B	97.54	150	~~155~~	155	155	190	195	~~200~~	195	350
8	Husam Hamada (PLE)	B	103.68	125	~~130~~	132	132	~~150~~	152	~~162~~	152	284
9	Bidyut Kumar Roy (BAN)	B	104.51	115	120	~~125~~	120	150	155	~~158~~	155	275
10	Bader Al-Shammari (IOC)	B	99.71	~~120~~	120	126	126	140	~~151~~	~~151~~	140	266
—	Hamed Majidi (IRI)	A	104.50	~~177~~	~~177~~	~~177~~	—	—	—	—	—	NM
—	Ahed Joughili (SYR)	A	104.76	~~170~~	~~170~~	~~176~~	—	—	—	—	—	NM
