= Ben Watson (weightlifter) =

British weightlifter

Personal information
- Full name: Benjamin Mathieu Watson
- Nationality: British
- Born: 20 March 1990 (age 36) Oxford, England
- Height: 6 ft 1 in (186 cm)
- Weight: 17 st 11 lb (113 kg)

Sport
- Sport: Weightlifting
- Event: 105 kg
Medal record
Men's weightlifting
Representing England
Commonwealth Games
| Bronze medal – third place | 2014 Glasgow | Men's 105 kg |
- Updated on 11 October 2014

Benjamin Mathieu "Ben" Watson (born 20 March 1990) is a British weightlifter from Oxfordshire. He competed for England in the men's 105 kg event at the 2014 Commonwealth Games where he won a bronze medal.

== Major results ==
| Year | Venue | Weight | Snatch (kg) | | | | Clean & Jerk (kg) | | | | Total | Rank |
| Year | Venue | Weight | 1 | 2 | 3 | Rank | 1 | 2 | 3 | Rank | Total | Rank |
Representing Great Britain
World Championships
| 2011 | Paris, France | 105 kg | 135 | 140 | ~~145~~ | 29 | 155 | 160 | ~~165~~ | 29 | 300 | 29 |
Representing England
Commonwealth Games
| 2018 | Brisbane, Australia | +105 kg | ~~155~~ | 155 | 160 | 5 | 185 | 192 | ~~200~~ | 6 | 352 | 6 |
| 2014 | Glasgow, Scotland | 105 kg | 147 | 152 | 157 | 1 | 180 | ~~185~~ | ~~185~~ | 6 | 337 | 3rd place, bronze medalist(s) |
Commonwealth Championships
| 2017 | Gold Coast, Australia | +105 kg | 148 | 153 | ~~157~~ | 5 | 175 | 180 | 184 | 8 | 337 | 6 |
| 2013 | Penang, Malaysia | 105 kg | —N/a | —N/a | —N/a | —N/a | —N/a | —N/a | —N/a | —N/a | 328 | 6 |
