= Wilford Vea =

Tongan weightlifter

Personal information
- Full name: Wilford Christopher Vea
- Born: 13 October 1992 (age 33)
- Weight: 102.53 kg (226.0 lb)

Sport
- Country: Tonga
- Sport: Weightlifting
- Weight class: 105 kg
- Team: National team
- Updated on 19 October 2016

Wilford Christopher Vea (born 13 October 1992) is a Tongan male weightlifter, competing in the 105 kg category and representing Tonga at international competitions. He participated at the 2014 Commonwealth Games in the 105 kg event.

== Major competitions ==
Year	Venue	Weight	Snatch (kg)				Clean & Jerk (kg)				Total	Rank
Year	Venue	Weight	1	2	3	Rank	1	2	3	Rank	Total	Rank
Commonwealth Games
2014	Glasgow, Scotland	105 kg	120	125	130	—N/a	~~150~~	~~150~~	150	—N/a	280	9
