= Maxwell Dal Santo =

Australian weightlifter

Max Dalsanto
Personal information
- Full name: Maxwell James Dal Santo
- Nickname: Maxibon
- Nationality: Australian
- Born: 16 February 1985 (age 41)
- Years active: 14 years
- Height: 178 cm (5 ft 10 in)
- Weight: 30.21 kg (66.6 lb)

Sport
- Country: Australia
- Sport: Weightlifting
- Weight class: 104 kg
- Team: Australia
- Retired: 2015
- Updated on 4 of may 2021

Maxwell James Dal Santo (born 16 February 1985) is an Australian weightlifter who competes in the 105 kg category. He has represented Australia in international competitions since 2002, including participation in the 2014 Commonwealth Games in the 105 kg event

== Major competitions ==
Year	Venue	Weight	Snatch (kg)				Clean & Jerk (kg)				Total	Rank
Year	Venue	Weight	1	2	3	Rank	1	2	3	Rank	Total	Rank
Commonwealth Games
2014	Glasgow, Scotland	105 kg	136	~~142~~	~~142~~	—N/a	167	~~176~~	176	—N/a	312	6
