= Kévin Bouly =

French weightlifter

Personal information
- Born: 26 April 1981 (age 45) Langres, France
- Height: 1.77 m (5 ft 10 in)
- Weight: 94 kg (207 lb)

Sport
- Country: France
- Sport: Weightlifting
- Updated on 9 April 2017

Kévin Bouly (born 26 April 1981) is a French male weightlifter, competing in the 94 kg category and representing France at international competitions. He participated in the men's 94 kg event at the 2015 World Weightlifting Championships, and at the 2016 Summer Olympics, finishing in twelfth position.

== Major results ==
Year	Venue	Weight	Snatch (kg)				Clean & Jerk (kg)				Total	Rank
Year	Venue	Weight	1	2	3	Rank	1	2	3	Rank	Total	Rank
World Championships
2015	Houston, United States	105 kg	153	~~157~~	157	28	194	~~199~~	~~199~~	25	351	25
2013	Wrocław, Poland	105 kg	151	~~156~~	~~156~~	18	186	191	~~200~~	16	342	16
2011	Paris, France	105 kg	149	154	~~159~~	26	188	194	198	21	352	23
