= Weightlifting at the 2014 Commonwealth Games – Men's 105 kg =

Weightlifting – Men's 105 kg at the 2014 Commonwealth Games
- Venue: Clyde Auditorium
- Dates: 30 July 2014
- Competitors: 12 from 10 nations
- Winning total weight: 348 kg

Medalists
gold medal	David Katoatau	Kiribati
silver medal	Stanislav Chalaev	New Zealand
bronze medal	Ben Watson	England

The men's 105 kg weightlifting event was the second-heaviest men's event at the 2014 Commonwealth Games, limiting competitors to a maximum of 105 kilograms of body mass. The competition took place on 30 July at 7:30 pm. The event took place at the Clyde Auditorium. By winning the gold medal, David Katoatau became the first medalist from Kiribati at the Commonwealth Games. He lifted a combined weight of 348 kg.

== Result ==
Rank	Athlete	Snatch (kg)				Clean & Jerk (kg)				Total
Rank	Athlete	1	2	3	Result	1	2	3	Result	Total
1st place, gold medalist(s)	David Katoatau (KIR)	144	148	148	148	194	200	205	200	348
2nd place, silver medalist(s)	Stanislav Chalaev (NZL)	150	155	158	155	183	186	191	186	341
3rd place, bronze medalist(s)	Ben Watson (ENG)	147	152	157	157	180	185	185	180	337
4	Tovia Opeloge (SAM)	141	146	150	146	184	184	185	185	331
5	Robert Galsworthy (AUS)	142	142	147	142	182	183	183	183	325
6	Maxwell Dalsanto (AUS)	136	142	142	136	167	176	176	176	312
7	Haroon Shukat (PAK)	141	145	147	145	165	165	167	167	312
8	Faavae Faauliuli (SAM)	125	125	130	125	176	181	185	181	306
9	Wilford Vea (TON)	120	125	130	130	150	150	150	150	280
10	James Adede (KEN)	110	115	120	115	145	145	147	145	260
11	Rexricco Melekitama (NIU)	91	91	96	91	110	118	125	125	216
-	Ivorn Mcknee (BAR)	150	155	155	155	190	190	190	—N/a	DNF
