= Navab Nassirshalal =

Iranian weightlifter (born 1989)

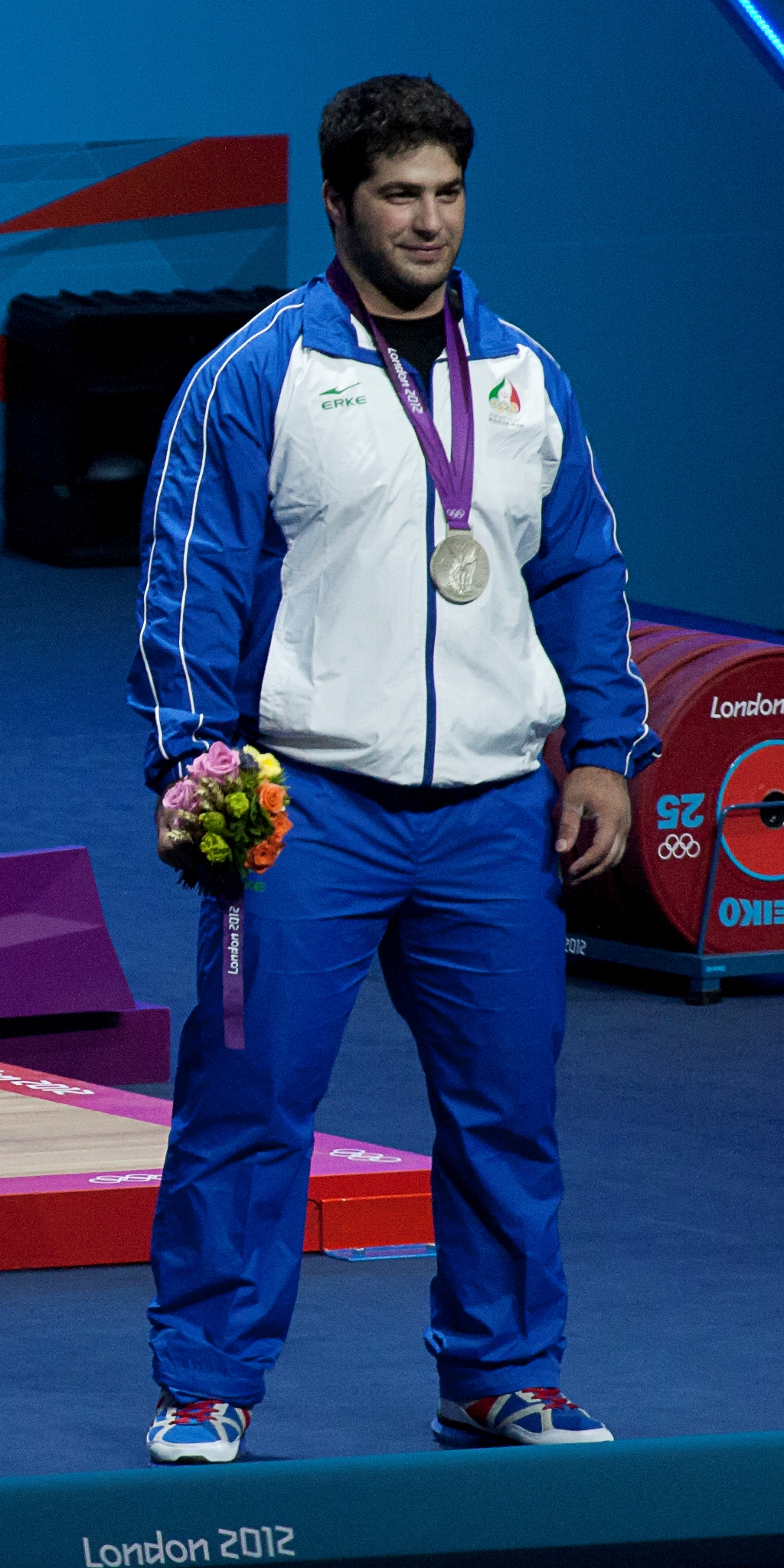
- Nassirshalal at the 2012 Summer Olympics

Personal information
- Full name: Navab Nassirshalal
- Nationality: Iran
- Born: April 1, 1989 (age 37) Ahvaz, Iran
- Education: Physical education Islamic Azad University Masjed Soleyman Branch
- Height: 1.75 m (5 ft 9 in)
- Weight: 104 kg (229 lb)

Sport
- Country: Iran
- Sport: Weightlifting
- Event: 105 kg
- Club: Melli Haffari Company Ahvaz Sports Club
- Coached by: Kourosh Bagheri
Medal record
Men's weightlifting
Representing Iran
Olympic Games
Gold medal – first place	2012 London	105 kg
Asian Championships
Silver medal – second place	2009 Taldykorgan	94 kg
Junior World Championships
Bronze medal – third place	2007 Prague	94 kg
Bronze medal – third place	2008 Cali	94 kg
- Updated on 26 July 2012

Navab Nassirshalal (also spelled Nasirshelal, Persian: نواب نصیرشلال, pronounced [nævˈvɒːb-e næsiːrʃæˈlɒːl]; born 1 April 1989) is an Iranian retired weightlifter who won a gold medal in the men's 105 kg event at the 2012 Summer Olympics. He began weightlifting at the age of 15 and has also won a bronze medal in the 94 kg class snatch at the 2007 Asian Weightlifting Championships, silver in the 94 kg clean and jerk and bronze overall at the 2009 edition, and gold in the 105 kg category in 2012 (after Oleksiy Torokhtiy was subsequently disqualified in 2019).

== Early life ==
Nassirshalal was born on April 1, 1989, in Ahvaz and raised in Masjed Soleyman in the Khuzestan Province of Iran. He started weightlifting because of his father at the age of 15, out of the National Iranian Oil Company club in the oil-rich city of Masjed Soleyman. As of 2012 he was studying physical education at the Islamic Azad University Masjed Soleyman Branch and was coached by Kourosh Bagheri of the Iranian national team, a two-time Asian and 2001 World Champion in the 94 kg division. He is a member of Melli Haffari Company Ahvaz Sports Club.

== Career ==
Nassirshalal made his international debut at the 2006 World Junior Weightlifting Championships in the 94 kg category, where he placed fifth. He earned two bronze medals at the 2007 edition, as well as silver at the 2007 Asian Junior Weightlifting Championships. He also competed at the Asian Championships senior level that year, winning bronze in the 94 kg class snatch. He won another bronze medal at the 2008 World Junior Championship before advancing permanently to the senior division in 2009, where he took silver in the 94 kg clean and jerk and bronze overall at the 2009 Asian Weightlifting Championships. After skipping the 2010 season and switching to the 105 kg division, he next appeared at the 2011 World Weightlifting Championships, placing sixth overall. He won his first international gold medal at the 2012 Asian Weightlifting Championships in the 105 kg snatch category. A technical error in the clean and jerk portion, however, left him out of contention for any more medals at this tournament. He was then selected to compete at the 2012 Summer Olympics in London where, despite competing with an aching knee, he won a silver medal in the 105 kg division, behind Oleksiy Torokhtiy of Ukraine, but later upgraded to the gold medal position following Torokhtiy's disqualification for doping. He participated in the same event at the 2014 Asian Games and the 2015 World Championships, but failed to set a mark in the clean and jerk in both cases.

== Major results ==
Year	Venue	Weight	Snatch (kg)				Clean & Jerk (kg)				Total	Rank
Year	Venue	Weight	1	2	3	Rank	1	2	3	Rank	Total	Rank
Olympic Games
2012	London, United Kingdom	105 kg	~~183~~	~~183~~	184	5	222	227	~~229~~	1	411	1st place, gold medalist(s)
World Championships
2011	Paris, France	105 kg	175	180	~~185~~	7	~~211~~	211	223	5	403	6
2015	Houston, United States	105 kg	~~181~~	181	~~186~~	6	~~220~~	~~223~~	~~226~~	--	--	--
Asian Games
2014	Incheon, South Korea	105 kg	176	181	~~184~~	3	~~217~~	~~219~~	~~219~~	--	--	--
Asian Championships
2007	Tai'an, China	94 kg	154			3rd place, bronze medalist(s)	191			6	345	4
2009	Taldykorgan, Kazakhstan	94 kg	~~164~~	169	~~171~~	4	~~197~~	197	207	1st place, gold medalist(s)	376	2nd place, silver medalist(s)
2012	Pyeongtaek, South Korea	105 kg	~~183~~	183	187	1st place, gold medalist(s)	~~225~~	~~225~~	~~225~~	--	--	--
World Junior Championships
2006	Hangzhou, China	94 kg	151	156	~~158~~	7	183	189	194	5	350	5
2007	Prague, Czech Republic	94 kg	156	161	~~164~~	3rd place, bronze medalist(s)	193	~~198~~	~~203~~	4	354	3rd place, bronze medalist(s)
2008	Cali, Colombia	94 kg	164	~~171~~	~~174~~	3rd place, bronze medalist(s)	194	199	~~211~~	3rd place, bronze medalist(s)	363	3rd place, bronze medalist(s)
