= Aleh Loban =

Belarusian weightlifter

Aleh Loban (born 15 January 1985) is a Belarusian weightlifter. He competed at the 2013 World Championships in the Men's 105 kg, winning the bronze medal in snatch.
