= Rum, Tyrol =

Rum
- Municipality
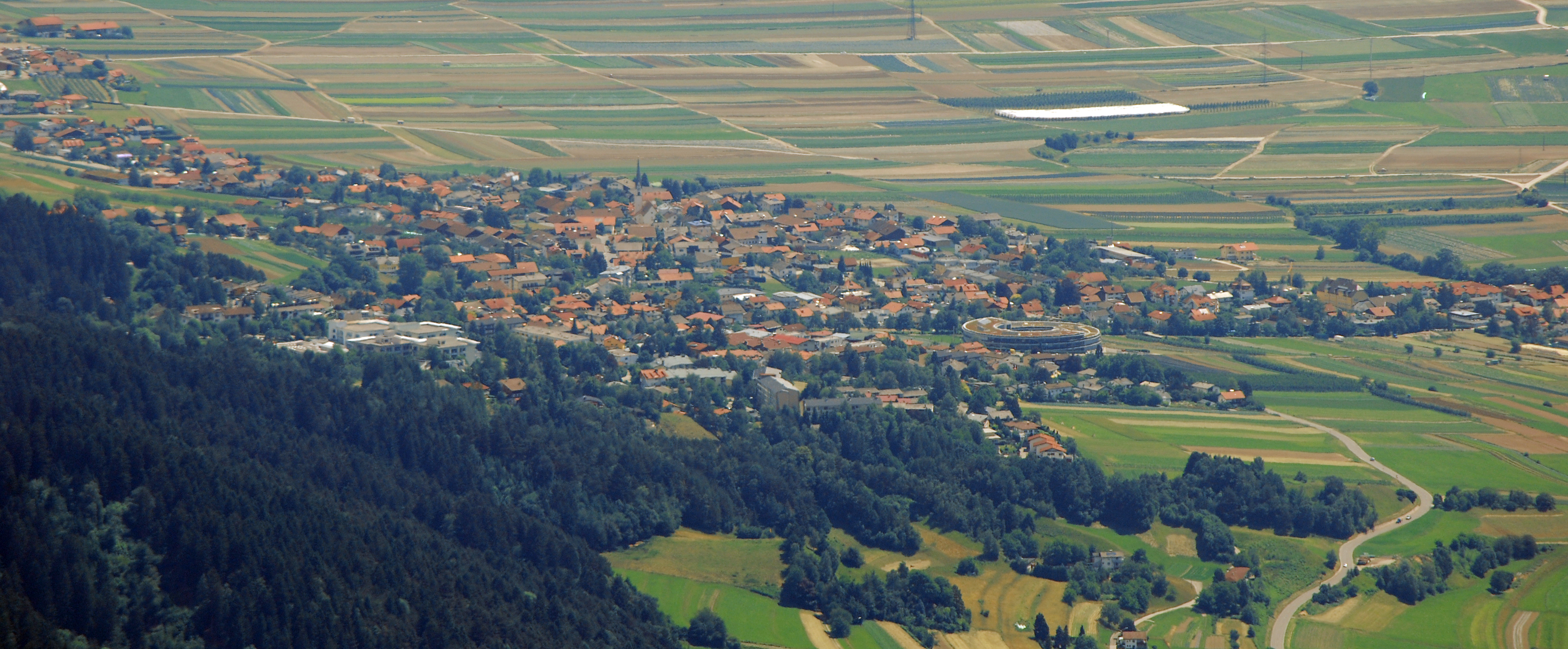
- Rum seen from the northwest

- Coat of arms

- Location within Austria
- Coordinates: 47°17′14″N 11°27′29″E
- Country: Austria
- State: Tyrol
- District: Innsbruck Land

Government
  - Mayor: Josef Karbon (SPÖ und Parteifreie)

Area
  - Total: 8.56 km^{2} (3.31 sq mi)
- Elevation: 621 m (2,037 ft)

Population (2022-01-01)
  - Total: 9,337
  - Density: 1,090/km^{2} (2,830/sq mi)
- Time zone: UTC+1 (CET)
  - Summer (DST): UTC+2 (CEST)
- Postal code: 6063
- Area code: 0512
- Vehicle registration: IL
- Website: www.rum.gv.at

Rum is a market town (since 1987) located in the Austrian state of Tyrol on the eastern border of Innsbruck in the administrative district of Innsbruck-Land.

Since World War II, because of proximity to Innsbruck and development of an industrial area in Neu-Rum (New Rum), which abuts the Olympic Village district of the city, its population has greatly increased and it has become one of the richest municipalities in the state. The Hoch-Rum (Upper Rum) neighbourhood above the old centre of the town was an earlier development and includes a private clinic.

Today Rum is functionally part of Innsbruck, sharing its municipal services and transportation network, but efforts to incorporate it into the city have so far been unsuccessful.

== Population ==
Historical population
Year	Pop.	±%
1869	597	—
1880	572	−4.2%
1890	570	−0.3%
1900	599	+5.1%
1910	732	+22.2%
1923	784	+7.1%
1934	1,335	+70.3%
1939	1,497	+12.1%
1951	1,700	+13.6%
1961	3,180	+87.1%
1971	5,135	+61.5%
1981	7,650	+49.0%
1991	8,095	+5.8%
2001	8,352	+3.2%
2011	8,850	+6.0%

== Notable people ==
- Clemens Schmid (born 1990), racing driver
