= Resul Elvan =

Turkish weightlifter (born 1989)

Personal information
- Born: 18 March 1989 (age 37)
- Weight: 104.16 kg (229.6 lb)

Sport
- Country: Turkey
- Sport: Weightlifting
- Team: National team
Medal record
Men's Weightlifting
Representing Turkey
Mediterranean Games
Bronze medal – third place	2018 Tarragona	105 kg Snatch
Silver medal – second place	2018 Tarragona	105 kg Clean & Jerk
- Updated on 1 September 2016

Resul Elvan (born 18 March 1989) is a Turkish male weightlifter, competing in the 105 kg category and representing Turkey at international competitions. He competed at world championships, including at the 2015 World Weightlifting Championships.

== Major results ==
Year	Venue	Weight	Snatch (kg)				Clean & Jerk (kg)				Total	Rank
Year	Venue	Weight	1	2	3	Rank	1	2	3	Rank	Total	Rank
World Championships
2015	Houston, United States	105 kg	~~160~~	~~160~~	161	26	201	~~205~~	~~208~~	22	362	22
2014	Almaty, Kazakhstan	105 kg	155	~~160~~	160	28	201	206	~~211~~	19	366	22
2010	Antalya, Turkey	94 kg	145	~~150~~	~~151~~	36	180	~~190~~	~~191~~	36	325	35
2009	Goyang, South Korea	94 kg	~~145~~	145	150	21	185	190	~~192~~	21	340	21
