= Khadzhimurat Akkaev =

Russian weightlifter (born 1985)

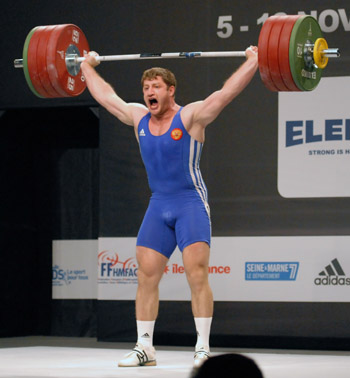
- Akkaev in 2011

Personal information
- Full name: Khadzhimurat Magomedovich Akkaev
- Nationality: Russian
- Born: March 27, 1985 (age 41) Tyrnyauz, Kabardino-Balkaria, Russian SFSR, Soviet Union
- Height: 1.78 m (5 ft 10 in)
- Weight: 105 kg (231 lb)

Sport
- Country: Russia
- Sport: Weightlifting
- Event: 105 kg
- Turned pro: 2000-
- Coached by: Makhty Makkaev

Achievements and titles
- Personal best: 430 kg (2011)
Medal record
Men's weightlifting
Olympic Games
Silver medal – second place	2004 Athens	−94 kg
Disqualified	2008 Beijing	–94 kg
World Championships
Gold medal – first place	2011 Paris	−105 kg
European Championships
Gold medal – first place	2011 Kazan	−105 kg

Khadzhimurat Magomedovich Akkaev (Russian: Хаджимурат Магомедович Аккаев, Karachay-Balkar: Аккайланы Магомедни жашы Хаджимурат, romanized: Akkaylanı Magomedni caşı Xacimurat; born March 27, 1985, in Tyrnyauz, Kabardino-Balkaria, USSR) is a Russian weightlifter.

== Career ==
Akkaev competed in the men's 94 kg category at the 2004 Summer Olympics in Athens, where he won a silver medal. He is 178 cm/5 ft 10 tall and weighs 105 kg/231 lb.

At the 2008 Summer Olympics in Beijing, he originally was awarded the bronze medal in the 94 kg category, with a total of 402 kg. In 2016, he was stripped of the medal after his sample tested positive for steroids.

Akkaev has moved up into −105 kg weight category as a replacement for Dmitry Lapikov and Dmitry Klokov. He won the 2011 European Weightlifting Championships in Kazan, with a total of 425 kg.

He became the 2011 World Champion in Paris, beating his compatriot Dmitry Klokov by 2 kg with a total of 430 kg.

Akkaev was scheduled to compete at the 2012 Summer Olympics in the 105 kg class but was forced to withdraw due to a back injury. On January 13, 2012, Akkaev was found to have failed a doping test prior to 2012 Olympic Games. He was provisionally suspended in January 2017, and finally in January 2019 he was disqualified for eight years, starting from 2 August 2016 until 1 August 2024.

== Major results ==
Year	Venue	Weight	Snatch (kg)				Clean & Jerk (kg)				Total	Rank
Year	Venue	Weight	1	2	3	Rank	1	2	3	Rank	Total	Rank
Olympic Games
2004	Athens, Greece	94 kg	180.0	185.0	~~187.5~~	2	215.0	~~220.0~~	220.0	4	405.0	2nd place, silver medalist(s)
2008	Beijing, China	94 kg	178	182	185	—	212	215	217	—	—	DSQ
World Championships
2011	Paris, France	105 kg	190	195	198	1st place, gold medalist(s)	222	228	232	1st place, gold medalist(s)	430	1st place, gold medalist(s)
European Championships
2010	Minsk, Belarus	94 kg	~~180~~	~~180~~	~~180~~	—	—	—	—	—	—	—
2011	Kazan, Russia	105 kg	185	190	195	1st place, gold medalist(s)	220	225	230	1st place, gold medalist(s)	425	1st place, gold medalist(s)
