= Victoria Hahn =

Austrian bobsledder

Personal information
- Nationality: Austrian
- Born: 17 March 1993 (age 32)

Sport
- Sport: Bobsleigh

Victoria Hahn (born 17 March 1993) is an Austrian bobsledder. She competed in the two-woman event at the 2018 Winter Olympics.
