= Bartłomiej Bonk =

Polish weightlifter (born 1984)

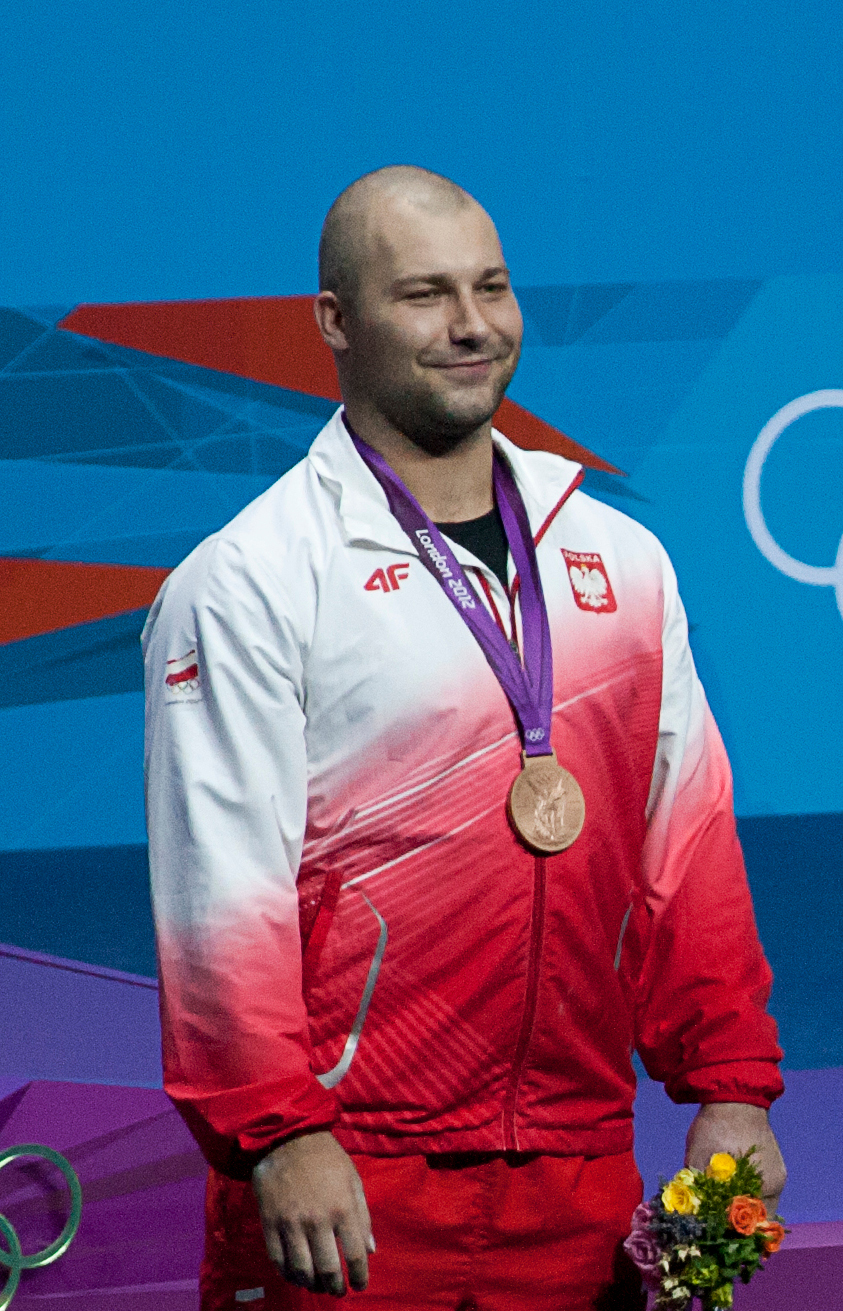
- Bonk at the London Olympics

Personal information
- Full name: Bartłomiej Wojciech Bonk
- Nationality: Polish
- Born: October 11, 1984 (age 41) Więcbork, Poland
- Years active: 2002-
- Height: 1.80 m (5 ft 11 in)
- Weight: 105 kg (231 lb)

Sport
- Country: Poland
- Sport: Olympic weightlifting
- Event: –105 kg
- Club: KS Budowlani Opole

Achievements and titles
- Personal bests: Snatch: 191 kg (2011); Clean & Jerk: 222 kg (2010); Total: 411 kg (2011)
Medal record
Olympic Games
Silver medal – second place	2012 London	-105 kg
World Championships
Bronze medal – third place	2013 Wrocław	−105 kg
European Championships
Gold medal – first place	2015 Tbilisi	-105 kg
Bronze medal – third place	2011 Kazan	-105 kg
- Updated on 27 October 2013

Bartłomiej Wojciech Bonk (born 11 October 1984) is a Polish weightlifter. He won the silver medal at the 2012 Summer Olympics in the men's 105 kg category with a total of 410 kg. He also competed at the 2008 Summer Olympics, but failed to score.
