= Jorge García (weightlifter) =

Chilean weightlifter (born 1987)

Personal information
- Born: 22 April 1987 (age 38) La Serena, Chile

Sport
- Sport: Weightlifting

Jorge Eduardo García Bustos (born 22 April 1987) is a Chilean weightlifter. He competed at the 2012 Summer Olympics in the -105 kg event.

At the 2010 South American Games in Medellín, he took fourth place in the clean and jerk. That same year he finished 11th in the Pan American Games held in Guatemala. In 2011, at the Pan American Games in Guadalajara he was in 6th place. His best results to date were in 153 kilos in the snatch and clean and jerk at 190. García won the – 105 bronze medal in clean and jerk during the 2014 Pan American Sports Festival.

== London 2012 ==
In London, came in 13th position after reaching the 15th position in the snatch with 150 kilos, and 13th in the clean and jerk with 191 kilos.
