= Ivan Efremov (weightlifter) =

Uzbekistani weightlifter (born 1986)

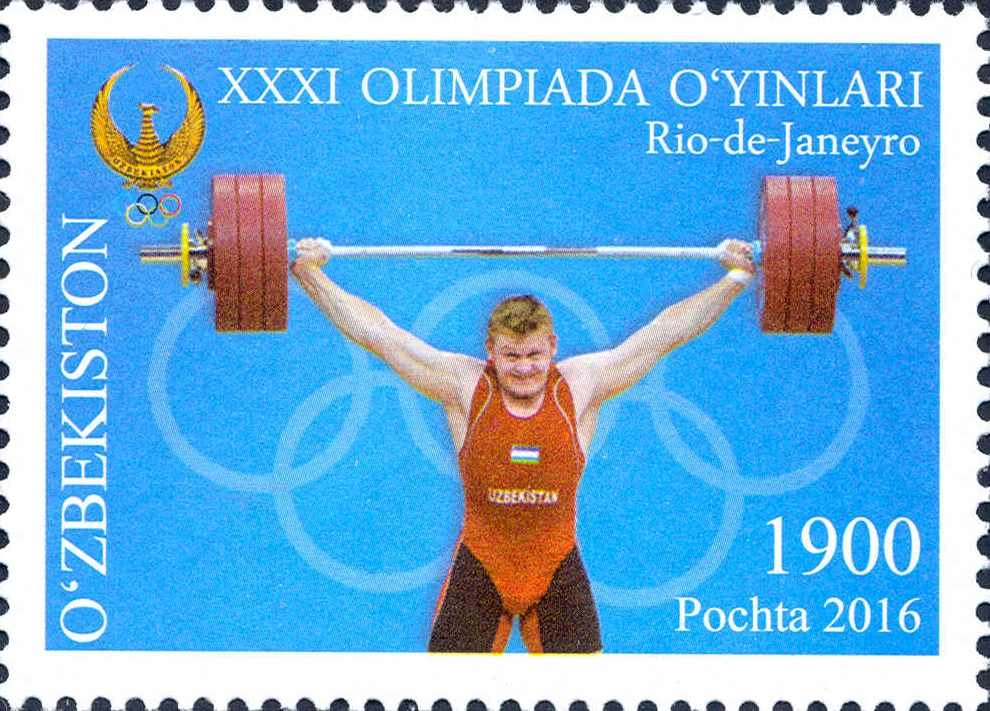
- Efremov on a 2016 stamp of Uzbekistan

Personal information
- Nationality: Uzbeki
- Born: 9 March 1986 (age 40) Tashkent Region, Uzbek SSR, Soviet Union
- Height: 1.84 m (6 ft 0 in)

Sport
- Country: Uzbekistan
- Sport: Weightlifting

Achievements and titles
- Personal bests: Snatch: 193 kg (2015); Clean and jerk: 222 kg (2014); Total: 414 kg (2014)
Medal record
Men's weightlifting
Representing Uzbekistan
Olympic Games
Bronze medal – third place	2012 London	-105 kg
World Championships
Bronze medal – third place	2017 Anaheim	–105 kg
Asian Games
Silver medal – second place	2010 Guangzhou	–105 kg
Asian Championships
Bronze medal – third place	2009 Taldykorgan	–105 kg
Bronze medal – third place	2015 Phuket	+105 kg
Islamic Solidarity Games
Bronze medal – third place	2017 Baku	105 kg

Ivan Efremov (Russian: Иван Ефремов, born 9 March 1986) is an Uzbekistani heavyweight weightlifter. He competed at the 2012 and 2016 Olympics and placed fifth in the −105 kg division on both occasions. Efremov is an ethnic Russian. He is married to Daria and has a daughter named Ulyana. Following disqualifications of other competitors, in 2020 Efremov was allocated the Olympic bronze medal for the 105 kg lift at the 2012 Olympics.
