= Gia Machavariani =

Georgian weightlifter

Personal information
- Born: 26 February 1985 (age 40) Kharagauli, Georgian SSR, Soviet Union

Sport
- Country: Georgia
- Sport: Weightlifting

Achievements and titles
- Olympic finals: 2012 Summer Olympics

Gia Machavariani (Georgian: გია მაჭავარიანი, born 26 February 1985 in Kharagauli) is a Georgian weightlifter. He competed at the 2012 Summer Olympics in the -105 kg event.
