= David Bedzhanyan =

Russian weightlifter of Armenian descent

Personal information
- Full name: David Isakovich Bedzhanyan
- Born: 6 September 1988 (age 37) Bolshoy Kamen, Russian SFSR
- Height: 1.76 m (5 ft 9 in)
- Weight: 105 kg (231 lb)

Sport
- Country: Russia
- Sport: Weightlifting
- Event: –105 kg

Achievements and titles
- Personal bests: Snatch: 187 kg (2014); Clean and jerk: 242 kg (2015); Total: 427 kg (2014)
Medal record
World Championships
Silver medal – second place	2013 Wrocław	–105 kg
Silver medal – second place	2015 Houston	–105 kg
Bronze medal – third place	2014 Almaty	–105 kg
European Championships
Gold medal – first place	2012 Antalya	–105 kg
Gold medal – first place	2013 Tirana	–105 kg
Universiade
Bronze medal – third place	2013 Kazan	–105 kg

David Isakovich Bedzhanyan (Russian: Дави́д Иса́кович Беджаня́н, born 6 September 1988) is a Russian weightlifter of Armenian descent.

Bedzhanyan won two gold medals at the 2012 and 2013 European Weightlifting Championships.

== Major results ==
Year	Venue	Weight	Snatch (kg)				Clean & Jerk (kg)				Total	Rank
Year	Venue	Weight	1	2	3	Rank	1	2	3	Rank	Total	Rank
World Championships
2013	Wrocław, Poland	105 kg	~~180~~	180	~~185~~	5	220	225	~~236~~	2nd place, silver medalist(s)	405	2nd place, silver medalist(s)
2014	Almaty, Kazakhstan	105 kg	180	185	187	4	225	~~236~~	240	2nd place, silver medalist(s)	427	3rd place, bronze medalist(s)
2015	Houston, United States	105 kg	180	~~185~~	~~185~~	9	225	231	~~242~~	1st place, gold medalist(s)	411	2nd place, silver medalist(s)
European Championships
2012	Antalya, Turkey	105 kg	175	180	185	2nd place, silver medalist(s)	220	~~230~~	~~239~~	1st place, gold medalist(s)	405	1st place, gold medalist(s)
2013	Tirana, Albania	105 kg	173	178	181	2nd place, silver medalist(s)	220	224	230	1st place, gold medalist(s)	411	1st place, gold medalist(s)
2017	Split, Croatia	105 kg	~~170~~	~~170~~	~~172~~	--	213	221	~~231~~	2nd place, silver medalist(s)	--	--
Summer Universiade
2013	Kazan, Russia	105 kg	175	179	~~183~~	3	211	216	224	1	403	3rd place, bronze medalist(s)
World Junior Championships
2008	Cali, Colombia	105 kg	165	~~169~~	~~169~~	4	210	~~218~~	~~218~~	4	375	4
