= Sargis Martirosjan =

Austrian weightlifter (born 1986)

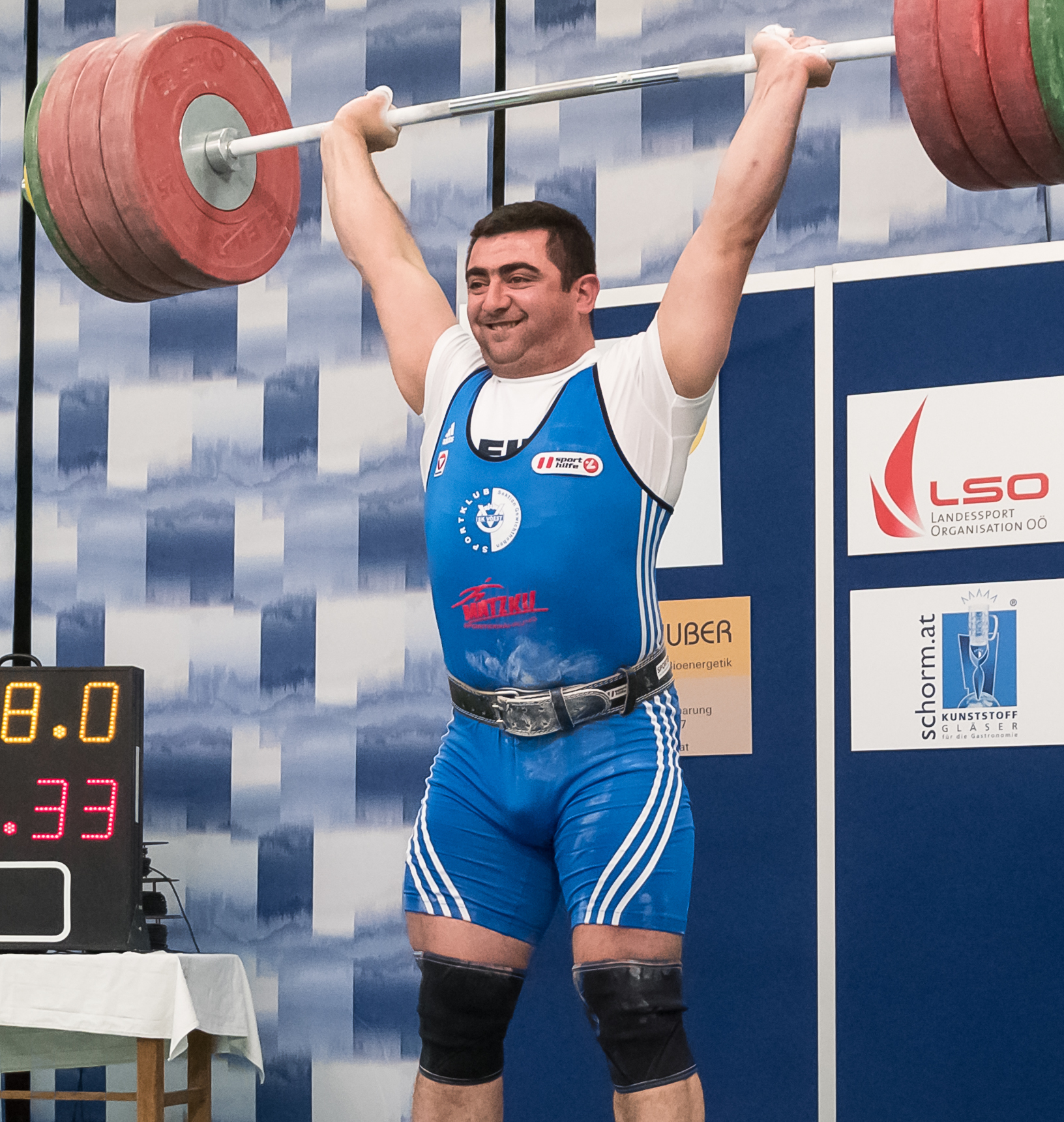
- Martirosjan in 2017

Personal information
- Nationality: Austrian
- Born: 14 September 1986 (age 39)
- Height: 1.79 m (5 ft 10 1/2 in)
- Weight: 104 kg (229 lb)

Sport
- Country: Austria
- Sport: Weightlifting
Medal record
Men's Weightlifting
Representing Austria
European Championships
| Bronze medal – third place | 2018 Bucharest | –105 kg |

Sargis Martirosjan (Armenian: Սարգիս Մարտիրոսյան; born 14 September 1986) is an Austrian Olympian weightlifter. He competed in the men's 105 kg event at the 2016 Summer Olympics held in Rio de Janeiro, Brazil.

He represented Austria at the 2020 Summer Olympics in Tokyo, Japan. He competed in the men's +109 kg event, finishing 10th.

== Results ==
| Year | Event | Venue | Weight | Snatch (kg) | | | | Clean & Jerk (kg) | | | | Total | Rank |
| Year | Event | Venue | Weight | 1 | 2 | 3 | Rank | 1 | 2 | 3 | Rank | Total | Rank |
|---|---|---|---|---|---|---|---|---|---|---|---|---|---|
| 2014 | 2014 World Championships | Baluan Sholak Sports Palace, Almaty, Kazakhstan | 105 kg | 176 | 180 | ~~183~~ | 7 | 202 | 206 | ~~211~~ | 18 | 386 | 12 |
| 2015 | 2015 European Championships | (Georgia (country)) Tbilisi, Georgia | 105 kg | 180 | ~~183~~ | ~~184~~ | 5 | ~~205~~ | 205 | ~~210~~ | 8 | 385 | 8 |
| 2015 | 2015 World Championships | Houston, United States | 105 kg | 178 | ~~181~~ | ~~183~~ | 11 | ~~202~~ | ~~202~~ | ~~202~~ | —N/a | —N/a | —N/a |
| 2016 | 2016 European Championships | Førde, Norway | 105 kg | 178 | 181 | ~~183~~ | 3 | 200 | ~~208~~ | ~~208~~ | 12 | 381 | 10 |
| 2016 | 1st INTERNATIONAL FAJR CUP | Tehran, Iran | 105 kg | 175 | 183 | ~~185~~ | 2 | 195 | ~~203~~ | 203 | 3 | 386 | 2 |
| 2016 | 2016 Summer Olympics | Rio, Brazil | 105 kg | 179 | ~~184~~ | ~~184~~ | 10 | 201 | 208 | 210 | 11 | 389 | 11 |
| 2017 | 2017 European Championships | Split, Croatia | 105 kg | ~~178~~ | ~~181~~ | 181 | 2 | 205 | ~~210~~ | ~~210~~ | 8 | 386 | 4 |
| 2017 | 2017 World Championships | Anaheim, United States | 105 kg | 178 | ~~182~~ | ~~184~~ | 7 | 203 | ~~208~~ | ~~210~~ | 13 | 381 | 11 |
| 2018 | 2018 European Championships | (Romania) Bucharest | 105 kg | 178 | 182 | ~~(184)~~ | 1 | 202 | ~~(206)~~ | ~~(208)~~ | 4 | 384 | 3 |
| 2019 | 2019 European Championships | (Georgia (country)) Batumi | 109 kg | 177 | 181 | ~~(183)~~ | 6 | 200 | 206 | ~~(211)~~ | 9 | 387 | 8 |
| 2019 | 2019 World Championships | (Thailand) Pattaya | 109 kg | 181 | ~~(180)~~ | ~~(182)~~ | 10 | 203 | ~~(208)~~ | 208 | 18 | 383 | 16 |
