= Sardorbek Dusmurotov =

Uzbekistani weightlifter (born 1993)

Personal information
- Nationality: Uzbekistani
- Born: 13 March 1993 (age 33)

Sport
- Sport: Weightlifting

Sardorbek Dusmurotov (born 13 March 1993) is an Uzbekistani weightlifter.

He competed at the 2016 Summer Olympics in Rio de Janeiro, in the men's +105 kg.
