= Jorge Arroyo (weightlifter) =

Ecuadorian weightlifter (born 1991)

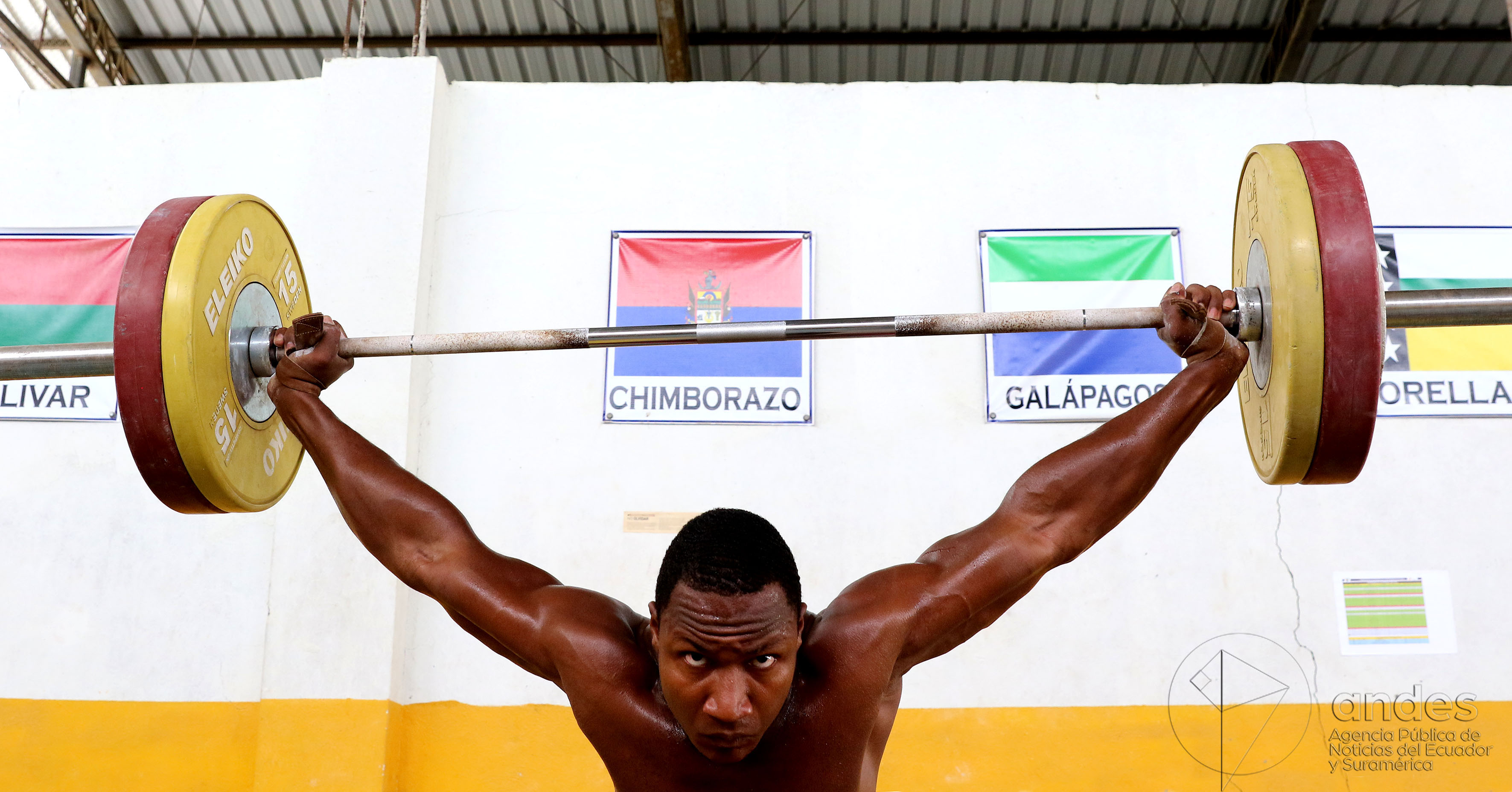

Personal information
- Full name: Jorge David Arroyo Váldez
- Nationality: Ecuador
- Born: 23 September 1991 (age 34) Francisco Orellana, Ecuador
- Height: 193 cm (6 ft 4 in)
- Weight: 104 kg (229 lb; 16 st 5 lb)

Sport
- Sport: Weightlifting
- Event: –105 kg
Medal record
Men's Weightlifting
Representing Ecuador
Pan American Games
Gold medal – first place	2011 Guadalajara	–105 kg
Bronze medal – third place	2015 Toronto	–105 kg
Bronze medal – third place	2019 Lima	–109 kg
South American Games
Gold medal – first place	2010 Medellín	–105 kg
Gold medal – first place	2014 Santiago	–105 kg
Silver medal – second place	2018 Cochabamba	–105 kg

Jorge David Arroyo Váldez (born 23 September 1991 in Guayaquil, Ecuador) is an Ecuadorian weightlifter. He competed at the 2012 Summer Olympics in the -105 kg event, finishing in 6th place.
