= List of Belarusian records in Olympic weightlifting =

Belarusian records in Olympics weightlifting

The following are the national records in Olympic weightlifting in Belarus. Records are maintained in each weight class for the snatch lift, Clean & Jerk lift, and the total for both lifts by the Belarus Weightlifting Union.

== Current records ==
Key to tables: Awaiting ratification Not ratified or later rescinded by Belarus Weightlifting Union

=== Men ===
Event	Record	Athlete	Date	Meet	Place	Ref
60 kg
Snatch	119 kg	Standard				
Clean & Jerk	139 kg	Standard				
Total	258 kg	Standard				
65 kg
Snatch	127 kg	Standard				
Clean & Jerk	156 kg	Daniil Blotski	August 2026	Belarusian Championships	Mogilev, Belarus	
Total	278 kg	Daniil Blotski	August 2026	Belarusian Championships	Mogilev, Belarus	
70 kg
Snatch		Standard				
Clean & Jerk		Standard				
Total		Standard				
75 kg
Snatch		Standard				
Clean & Jerk		Standard				
Total		Standard				
85 kg
Snatch	161 kg	Andrei Balbyshau	August 2026	Belarusian Championships	Mogilev, Belarus	
Clean & Jerk		Standard				
Total		Standard				
95 kg
Snatch	175 kg	Ihar Lozka	August 2026	Belarusian Championships	Mogilev, Belarus	
Clean & Jerk	210 kg	Ihar Lozka	August 2026	Belarusian Championships	Mogilev, Belarus	
Total	385 kg	Ihar Lozka	August 2026	Belarusian Championships	Mogilev, Belarus	
110 kg
Snatch	181 kg	Siarhei Sharankou	February 2026	Belarusian Cup	Grodno, Belarus	
Clean & Jerk	215 kg	Standard				
Clean & Jerk	220 kg	Siarhei Sharankou	25 April 2026	European Championships	Batumi, Georgia	
Total	395 kg	Standard				
Total	401 kg	Siarhei Sharankou	25 April 2026	European Championships	Batumi, Georgia	
+110 kg
Snatch	190 kg	Standard				
Clean & Jerk	225 kg	Standard				
Total	410 kg	Standard				

=== Women ===
Event	Record	Athlete	Date	Meet	Place	Ref
49 kg
Snatch		Standard				
Clean & Jerk	87 kg	Varvara Baradzinava	August 2026	Belarusian Championships	Mogilev, Belarus	
Total	154 kg	Varvara Baradzinava	August 2026	Belarusian Championships	Mogilev, Belarus	
Total	155 kg	Varvara Baradzinava	12 October 2026	European Junior Championships	Durrës, Albania	
53 kg
Snatch	84 kg	Yuliya Katsianiova	August 2026	Belarusian Championships	Mogilev, Belarus	
Clean & Jerk	101 kg	Yuliya Katsianiova	August 2026	Belarusian Championships	Mogilev, Belarus	
Clean & Jerk	107 kg	Yuliya Katsianiova	29 October 2026	World Championships	Ningbo, China	
Total	185 kg	Yuliya Katsianiova	August 2026	Belarusian Championships	Mogilev, Belarus	
Total	189 kg	Yuliya Katsianiova	29 October 2026	World Championships	Ningbo, China	
57 kg
Snatch	85 kg	Yauheniya Ilyina	August 2026	Belarusian Championships	Mogilev, Belarus	
Snatch	86 kg	Yauheniya Ilyina	13 October 2026	European Junior Championships	Durrës, Albania	
Clean & Jerk	105 kg	Yauheniya Ilyina	August 2026	Belarusian Championships	Mogilev, Belarus	
Total	190 kg	Yauheniya Ilyina	August 2026	Belarusian Championships	Mogilev, Belarus	
61 kg
Snatch		Standard				
Clean & Jerk	120 kg	Alina Shchapanava	August 2026	Belarusian Championships	Mogilev, Belarus	
Total	215 kg	Alina Shchapanava	August 2026	Belarusian Championships	Mogilev, Belarus	
Total	217 kg	Alina Shchapanava	1 November 2026	World Championships	Ningbo, China	
69 kg
Snatch	107 kg	Siuzanna Valodzka	February 2026	Belarusian Cup	Grodno, Belarus	
Snatch	108 kg	Siuzanna Valodzka	22 April 2026	European Championships	Batumi, Georgia	
Clean & Jerk	133 kg	Siuzanna Valodzka	February 2026	Belarusian Cup	Grodno, Belarus	
Clean & Jerk	136 kg	Siuzanna Valodzka	3 November 2026	World Championships	Ningbo, China	
Total	240 kg	Siuzanna Valodzka	February 2026	Belarusian Cup	Grodno, Belarus	
Total	244 kg	Siuzanna Valodzka	3 November 2026	World Championships	Ningbo, China	
77 kg
Snatch	108 kg	Darya Naumava	August 2026	Belarusian Championships	Mogilev, Belarus	
Clean & Jerk	137 kg	Darya Naumava	August 2026	Belarusian Championships	Mogilev, Belarus	
Total	245 kg	Darya Naumava	August 2026	Belarusian Championships	Mogilev, Belarus	
86 kg
Snatch	104 kg	Darya Kheidzer	February 2026	Belarusian Cup	Grodno, Belarus	
Clean & Jerk	124 kg	Darya Kheidzer	February 2026	Belarusian Cup	Grodno, Belarus	
Total	228 kg	Darya Kheidzer	February 2026	Belarusian Cup	Grodno, Belarus	
+86 kg
Snatch	111 kg	Alena Bondzikava	May 2026	Belarusian U23 Championships	Brest, Belarus	
Snatch	113 kg	Alena Bondzikava	19 October 2026	European U23 Championships	Durrës, Albania	
Clean & Jerk	131 kg	Alena Bondzikava	May 2026	Belarusian U23 Championships	Brest, Belarus	
Clean & Jerk	132 kg	Alena Bondzikava	19 October 2026	European U23 Championships	Durrës, Albania	
Total	242 kg	Alena Bondzikava	May 2026	Belarusian U23 Championships	Brest, Belarus	
Total	245 kg	Alena Bondzikava	19 October 2026	European U23 Championships	Durrës, Albania	

== Historical records ==
=== Men (2025–2026) ===
Event	Record	Athlete	Date	Meet	Place	Ref
71 kg
Snatch	145 kg	Standard				
Clean & Jerk	175 kg	Standard				
Clean & Jerk	183 kg	Yahor Papou	21 April 2026	European Championships	Batumi, Georgia	
Total	317 kg	Artsem Danilchyk	February 2026	Belarusian Cup	Grodno, Belarus	
Total	328 kg	Yahor Papou	21 April 2026	European Championships	Batumi, Georgia	
79 kg
Snatch	154 kg	Vadzim Likharad	February 2026	Belarusian Cup	Grodno, Belarus	
Clean & Jerk	184 kg	Vadzim Likharad	February 2026	Belarusian Cup	Grodno, Belarus	
Total	338 kg	Vadzim Likharad	February 2026	Belarusian Cup	Grodno, Belarus	
88 kg
Snatch	158 kg	Standard				
Snatch	160 kg	Petr Asayonak	23 April 2026	European Championships	Batumi, Georgia	
Clean & Jerk	195 kg	Ihar Lozka	February 2026	Belarusian Cup	Grodno, Belarus	
Clean & Jerk	196 kg	Petr Asayonak	23 April 2026	European Championships	Batumi, Georgia	
Total	350 kg	Standard				
Total	356 kg	Petr Asayonak	23 April 2026	European Championships	Batumi, Georgia	
94 kg
Snatch	165 kg	Standard				
Clean & Jerk	202 kg	Standard				
Total	365 kg	Standard				

=== Men (2018–2025) ===
Event	Record	Athlete	Date	Meet	Place	Ref
55 kg
Snatch	115 kg	Standard				
Clean & Jerk	140 kg	Standard				
Total	250 kg	Standard				
61 kg
Snatch	134 kg	Henadz Laptseu	16 September 2020	Belarusian Championships	Minsk, Belarus	
Clean & Jerk	155 kg	Standard				
Total	287 kg	Henadz Laptseu	December 2022	A.P. Kurynov Memorial	Zelenodolsk, Russia	
67 kg
Snatch	142 kg	Henadz Laptseu	20 September 2019	World Championships	Pattaya, Thailand	
Clean & Jerk	171 kg	Henadz Laptseu	20 September 2019	World Championships	Pattaya, Thailand	
Total	313 kg	Henadz Laptseu	20 September 2019	World Championships	Pattaya, Thailand	
73 kg
Snatch	154 kg	Vadzim Likharad	21 September 2019	World Championships	Pattaya, Thailand	
Snatch	156 kg	Vadzim Likharad	4 November 2018	World Championships	Ashgabat, Turkmenistan	
Clean & Jerk	185 kg	Andrei Fralou	May 2023	Belarusian Championships	Mogilev, Belarus	
Clean & Jerk	187 kg	Vadzim Likharad	4 November 2018	World Championships	Ashgabat, Turkmenistan	
Total	338 kg	Vadzim Likharad	21 September 2019	World Championships	Pattaya, Thailand	
Total	343 kg	Vadzim Likharad	4 November 2018	World Championships	Ashgabat, Turkmenistan	
81 kg
Snatch	163 kg	Standard				
Snatch	163 kg	Petr Asayonak	5 November 2018	World Championships	Ashgabat, Turkmenistan	
Clean & Jerk	197 kg	Ihar Lozka	27 February 2020	Belarusian Cup	Gomel, Belarus	
Total	355 kg	Petr Asayonak	10 April 2019	European Championships	Batumi, Georgia	
Total	357 kg	Petr Asayonak	5 November 2018	World Championships	Ashgabat, Turkmenistan	
89 kg
Snatch	170 kg	Ihar Lozka	May 2023	Belarusian Championships	Mogilev, Belarus	
Clean & Jerk	207 kg	Petr Asayonak	17 February 2024	European Championships	Sofia, Bulgaria	
Total	375 kg	Ihar Lozka	May 2023	Belarusian Championships	Mogilev, Belarus	
96 kg
Snatch	179 kg	Yauheni Tsikhantsou	May 2021	Belarusian Championships	Grodno, Belarus	
Snatch	180 kg	Yauheni Tsikhantsou	7 November 2018	World Championships	Ashgabat, Turkmenistan	
Clean & Jerk	222 kg	Yauheni Tsikhantsou	12 April 2019	European Championships	Batumi, Georgia	
Total	400 kg	Yauheni Tsikhantsou	12 April 2019	European Championships	Batumi, Georgia	
102 kg
Snatch	183 kg	Yauheni Tsikhantsou	14 September 2023	World Championships	Riyadh, Saudi Arabia	
Clean & Jerk	218 kg	Yauheni Tsikhantsou	25 September 2019	World Championships	Pattaya, Thailand	
Clean & Jerk	219 kg	Yauheni Tsikhantsou	10 August 2024	Olympic Games	Paris, France	
Total	398 kg	Yauheni Tsikhantsou	25 September 2019	World Championships	Pattaya, Thailand	
Total	400 kg	Yauheni Tsikhantsou	8 April 2024	World Cup	Phuket, Thailand	
Total	402 kg	Yauheni Tsikhantsou	10 August 2024	Olympic Games	Paris, France	
109 kg
Snatch	198 kg	Andrei Aramnau	26 September 2019	World Championships	Pattaya, Thailand	
Clean & Jerk	228 kg	Andrei Aramnau	26 September 2019	World Championships	Pattaya, Thailand	
Total	426 kg	Andrei Aramnau	26 September 2019	World Championships	Pattaya, Thailand	
+109 kg
Snatch	206 kg	Eduard Ziaziulin	17 December 2021	World Championships	Tashkent, Uzbekistan	
Clean & Jerk	241 kg	Eduard Ziaziulin	17 December 2021	World Championships	Tashkent, Uzbekistan	
Total	447 kg	Eduard Ziaziulin	17 December 2021	World Championships	Tashkent, Uzbekistan	

=== Men (1998–2018) ===
Event	Record	Athlete	Date	Meet	Place	Ref
–56 kg
Snatch	127.5 kg	Vitaly Derbenev	15 April 2003	European Championships	Loutraki, Greece	
Clean & Jerk	152.5 kg	Vitaly Derbenev	24 April 2002	European Championships	Antalya, Turkey	
Total	280 kg	Vitaly Derbenev	20 April 2004	European Championships	Kyiv, Ukraine	
–62 kg
Snatch	142.5 kg	Gennady Oleshchuk	17 September 2000	Olympic Games	Sydney, Australia	
Clean & Jerk	181 kg	Gennady Oleshchuk	5 November 2001	World Championships	Antalya, Turkey	
Total	317.5 kg	Gennady Oleshchuk	17 September 2000	Olympic Games	Sydney, Australia	
–69 kg
Snatch	157.5 kg	Sergei Lavrenov	20 September 2000	Olympic Games	Sydney, Australia	
Clean & Jerk	197 kg^{1}	Gennady Oleshchuk	4 April 2006	European Championships	Władysławowo, Poland	
Total	350 kg^{1}	Gennady Oleshchuk	4 April 2006	European Championships	Władysławowo, Poland	
–77 kg
Snatch	163 kg	Ivan Klim	11 March 2016	Belarusian Cup	Minsk, Belarus	
Clean & Jerk	197 kg	Petr Asayonak	25 September 2014	Belarus Championships	Grodno, Belarus	
Total	355 kg	Leonid Psevkin	15 February 2007	Belarus Championships	Barysaw, Belarus	
–85 kg
Snatch	187 kg	Andrei Rybakou	22 September 2007	World Championships	Chiang Mai, Thailand	
Clean & Jerk	213 kg	Petr Asayonak	9 October 2015	Belarus Championships	Grodno, Belarus	
Total	394 kg	Andrei Rybakou	15 August 2008	Olympic Games	Beijing, China	
–94 kg
Snatch	191 kg	Andrei Rybakou	6 June 2008	Belarus Championships	Minsk, Belarus	
Clean & Jerk	230 kg	Vadzim Straltsou	27 November 2015	World Championships	Houston, United States	
Total	407 kg	Vadzim Straltsou	9 October 2015	Belarus Championships	Grodno, Belarus	
–105 kg
Snatch	200 kg	Andrei Aramnau	18 August 2008	Olympic Games	Beijing, China	
Clean & Jerk	236 kg	Andrei Aramnau	18 August 2008	Olympic Games	Beijing, China	
Total	436 kg	Andrei Aramnau	18 August 2008	Olympic Games	Beijing, China	
+105 kg
Snatch	202 kg	Yauheni Zharnasek	26 July 2014	Belarusian Cup	Minsk, Belarus	
Clean & Jerk	240 kg	Andrei Aramnau	7 June 2008	Belarus Championships	Minsk, Belarus	
Total	440 kg	Andrei Aramnau	7 June 2008	Belarus Championships	Minsk, Belarus	

=== Women (2025–2026) ===
Event	Record	Athlete	Date	Meet	Place	Ref
48 kg
Snatch	77 kg	Varvara Baradzinava	February 2026	Belarusian Cup	Grodno, Belarus	
Clean & Jerk	82 kg	Varvara Baradzinava	February 2026	Belarusian Cup	Grodno, Belarus	
Total	147 kg	Varvara Baradzinava	February 2026	Belarusian Cup	Grodno, Belarus	
58 kg
Snatch	82 kg	Viktoryia Hnap	February 2026	Belarusian Cup	Grodno, Belarus	
Clean & Jerk	107 kg	Standard				
Total	187 kg	Standard				
63 kg
Snatch	101 kg	Alina Shchapanava	February 2026	Belarusian Cup	Grodno, Belarus	
Clean & Jerk	120 kg	Alina Shchapanava	February 2026	Belarusian Cup	Grodno, Belarus	
Clean & Jerk	122 kg	Alina Shchapanava	21 April 2026	European Championships	Batumi, Georgia	
Total	221 kg	Alina Shchapanava	February 2026	Belarusian Cup	Grodno, Belarus	

=== Women (2018–2025) ===
Event	Record	Athlete	Date	Meet	Place	Ref
45 kg
Snatch	72 kg	Standard				
Clean & Jerk	90 kg	Standard				
Total	160 kg	Standard				
49 kg
Snatch	77 kg	Standard				
Clean & Jerk	95 kg	Standard				
Total	170 kg	Standard				
55 kg
Snatch	87 kg	Yuliya Hulina	June 2024	BRICS Games	Kazan, Russia	
Clean & Jerk	106 kg	Liudmila Psyschanitsa	19 February 2019	Belarusian Cup	Barysaw, Belarus	
Total	190 kg	Standard				
59 kg
Snatch	99 kg	Alina Shchapanava	June 2024	BRICS Games	Kazan, Russia	
Clean & Jerk	120 kg	Alina Shchapanava	12 June 2023	IWF Grand Prix	Havana, Cuba	
Total	218 kg	Alina Shchapanava	June 2024	BRICS Games	Kazan, Russia	
64 kg
Snatch	100 kg	Alina Shchapanava	May 2024	Belarusian Cup	Mogilev, Belarus	
Clean & Jerk	123 kg	Alina Shchapanava	May 2024	Belarusian Cup	Mogilev, Belarus	
Total	223 kg	Alina Shchapanava	May 2024	Belarusian Cup	Mogilev, Belarus	
71 kg
Snatch	108 kg	Siuzanna Valodzka	14 June 2023	IWF Grand Prix	Havana, Cuba	
Snatch	111 kg	Siuzanna Valodzka	9 August 2024	Olympic Games	Paris, France	
Clean & Jerk	134 kg	Siuzanna Valodzka	14 June 2023	IWF Grand Prix	Havana, Cuba	
Clean & Jerk	135 kg	Siuzanna Valodzka	13 September 2023	World Championships	Riyadh, Saudi Arabia	
Clean & Jerk	135 kg	Siuzanna Valodzka	9 August 2024	Olympic Games	Paris, France	
Total	242 kg	Siuzanna Valodzka	14 June 2023	IWF Grand Prix	Havana, Cuba	
Total	246 kg	Siuzanna Valodzka	9 August 2024	Olympic Games	Paris, France	
76 kg
Snatch	110 kg	Standard				
Clean & Jerk	138 kg	Standard				
Total	245 kg	Standard				
81 kg
Snatch	113 kg	Darya Naumava	May 2024	Belarusian Cup	Mogilev, Belarus	
Clean & Jerk	143 kg	Darya Naumava	May 2024	Belarusian Cup	Mogilev, Belarus	
Total	256 kg	Darya Naumava	May 2024	Belarusian Cup	Mogilev, Belarus	
87 kg
Snatch	115 kg	Standard				
Clean & Jerk	142 kg	Standard				
Total	255 kg	Standard				
+87 kg
Snatch	117 kg	Standard				
Clean & Jerk	152 kg	Standard				
Total	265 kg	Standard				

=== Women (1998–2018) ===
Event	Record	Athlete	Date	Meet	Place	Ref
–48 kg
Snatch	75 kg	Margarita Zinkovets	25 May 2016	Belarusian Championships	Grodno, Belarus	
Clean & Jerk	91 kg	Alena Lyakhovets	10 March 2016	Belarusian Cup	Minsk, Belarus	
Total	165 kg	Alena Lyakhovets	10 March 2016	Belarusian Cup	Minsk, Belarus	
–53 kg
Snatch	95 kg	Nastassia Novikava	10 August 2008	Olympic Games	Beijing, China	
Clean & Jerk	119 kg	Nastassia Novikava	22 September 2007	World Championships	Chiang Mai, Thailand	
Total	213 kg	Nastassia Novikava	22 September 2007	World Championships	Chiang Mai, Thailand	
–58 kg
Snatch	105 kg	Nastassia Novikava	7 April 2010	European Championships	Minsk, Belarus	
Clean & Jerk	136 kg	Nastassia Novikava	7 November 2011	World Championships	Paris, France	
Total	238 kg	Nastassia Novikava	7 April 2010	European Championships	Minsk, Belarus	
–63 kg
Snatch	115 kg	Hanna Batsiushka	18 August 2004	Olympic Games	Athens, Greece	
Clean & Jerk	140 kg	Nastassia Novikava	25 September 2014	Belarus Championships	Grodno, Belarus	
Total	250 kg	Nastassia Novikava	25 September 2014	Belarus Championships	Grodno, Belarus	
–69 kg
Snatch	117 kg	Dzina Sazanavets	14 November 2014	World Championships	Almaty, Kazakhstan	
Clean & Jerk	145 kg	Anastasiya Mikhalenka	27 May 2016	Belarusian Championships	Grodno, Belarus	
Total	260 kg	Dzina Sazanavets	14 November 2014	World Championships	Almaty, Kazakhstan	
–75 kg
Snatch	122 kg	Iryna Kulesha	1 June 2012	Belarus Championships	Minsk, Belarus	
Clean & Jerk	151 kg	Darya Naumava	9 October 2015	Belarus Championships	Grodno, Belarus	
Total	269 kg	Iryna Kulesha	3 August 2012	Olympic Games	London, United Kingdom	
+75 kg
Snatch	128 kg	Katsiaryna Shkuratava	6 September 2013	Belarus Championships	Grodno, Belarus	
Clean & Jerk	170 kg	Katsiaryna Shkuratava	6 September 2013	Belarus Championships	Grodno, Belarus	
Total	298 kg	Katsiaryna Shkuratava	6 September 2013	Belarus Championships	Grodno, Belarus	

- ^1 Oleshchuk failed the competition doping test and the IWF canceled the results, the BWU however still lists them as records
