= 2014 World Weightlifting Championships – Men's 94 kg =

The men's 94 kilograms event at the 2014 World Weightlifting Championships was held on 13–14 November 2014 in Baluan Sholak Sports Palace, Almaty, Kazakhstan.

== Schedule ==
Date	Time	Event
13 November 2014	09:00	Group D
13 November 2014	21:00	Group C
14 November 2014	13:00	Group B
14 November 2014	19:00	Group A

== Medalists ==
Event	Gold		Silver		Bronze	
Snatch	Aurimas Didžbalis (LTU)	185 kg	Zhassulan Kydyrbayev (KAZ)	179 kg	Rinat Kireev (RUS)	176 kg
Clean & Jerk	Zhassulan Kydyrbayev (KAZ)	229 kg	Liu Hao (CHN)	221 kg	Vadzim Straltsou (BLR)	216 kg
Total	Zhassulan Kydyrbayev (KAZ)	408 kg	Aurimas Didžbalis (LTU)	399 kg	Vadzim Straltsou (BLR)	392 kg

== Records ==
Prior to this competition, the existing world records were as follows.

World record	Snatch	Akakios Kakiasvilis (GRE)	188 kg	Athens, Greece	27 November 1999
World record	Clean & Jerk	~~Ilya Ilyin (KAZ)~~; Szymon Kołecki (POL)	~~233 kg~~ 232 kg	~~London, United Kingdom~~; Sofia, Bulgaria	~~4 August 2012~~; 29 April 2000
World record	Total	~~Ilya Ilyin (KAZ)~~; Akakios Kakiasvilis (GRE)	~~418 kg~~ 412 kg	~~London, United Kingdom~~; Athens, Greece	~~4 August 2012~~; 27 November 1999

- Ilya Ilyin's world records were rescinded in 2016.

== Results ==
Rank	Athlete	Group	Body weight	Snatch (kg)				Clean & Jerk (kg)				Total
Rank	Athlete	Group	Body weight	1	2	3	Rank	1	2	3	Rank	Total
1st place, gold medalist(s)	Zhassulan Kydyrbayev (KAZ)	A	93.89	175	179	~~182~~	2nd place, silver medalist(s)	215	221	229	1st place, gold medalist(s)	408
2nd place, silver medalist(s)	Aurimas Didžbalis (LTU)	A	93.20	175	181	185	1st place, gold medalist(s)	214	~~218~~	~~218~~	4	399
3rd place, bronze medalist(s)	Vadzim Straltsou (BLR)	A	93.62	170	176	~~179~~	4	207	216	~~224~~	3rd place, bronze medalist(s)	392
4	Rinat Kireev (RUS)	A	93.61	169	174	176	3rd place, bronze medalist(s)	~~211~~	214	~~224~~	5	390
5	Liu Hao (CHN)	A	93.59	~~165~~	165	~~173~~	14	215	~~221~~	221	2nd place, silver medalist(s)	386
6	Tomasz Zieliński (POL)	A	93.28	168	172	~~174~~	7	208	211	~~214~~	6	383
7	Dmytro Chumak (UKR)	A	93.29	173	~~177~~	~~178~~	5	205	210	~~215~~	7	383
8	Anatolie Cîrîcu (MDA)	A	93.32	162	167	170	9	210	~~216~~	~~216~~	8	380
9	Vasil Gospodinov (BUL)	B	93.53	166	173	~~177~~	6	~~196~~	196	204	10	377
10	Aliaksandr Bersanau (BLR)	A	92.41	166	170	~~173~~	8	~~200~~	200	205	9	375
11	Ragab Abdelhay (EGY)	A	93.35	162	167	170	10	~~203~~	203	—	11	373
12	Žygimantas Stanulis (LTU)	C	93.83	163	~~170~~	170	11	191	196	203	12	373
13	Dadash Dadashbayli (AZE)	B	93.55	160	165	~~168~~	13	200	~~209~~	~~210~~	15	365
14	Colin Burns (USA)	B	93.44	162	~~167~~	169	12	~~193~~	193	~~198~~	17	362
15	Jasurbek Jumaýew (TKM)	B	93.66	~~159~~	159	~~164~~	21	195	~~199~~	202	13	361
16	Jung Hyeon-seop (KOR)	B	92.68	~~160~~	160	—	18	200	—	—	14	360
17	Sarat Sumpradit (THA)	B	93.74	155	161	~~164~~	17	193	~~196~~	~~196~~	18	354
18	David Matam (FRA)	B	93.17	155	160	~~163~~	19	190	193	~~195~~	16	353
19	Víctor Quiñones (CUB)	D	93.29	154	159	162	15	185	191	~~197~~	19	353
20	Endri Haxhihyseni (ALB)	C	93.44	155	162	~~165~~	16	181	186	~~190~~	23	348
21	Nika Nanadze (GEO)	C	93.50	153	156	~~159~~	23	183	187	~~193~~	21	343
22	Marco Gregório (BRA)	B	90.95	~~157~~	157	~~163~~	22	185	~~193~~	~~193~~	24	342
23	Saddam Messaoui (ALG)	C	91.08	150	155	~~157~~	24	180	~~185~~	186	22	341
24	Sopot Sula (ALB)	C	90.35	145	152	~~157~~	25	180	185	187	20	339
25	Christos Saltsidis (GRE)	C	93.75	~~150~~	150	~~155~~	27	180	185	~~190~~	25	335
26	Abbas Al-Qaisoum (KSA)	D	91.66	~~144~~	146	149	29	171	178	181	28	330
27	Trần Văn Hóa (VIE)	D	93.19	145	~~150~~	~~151~~	31	180	184	~~190~~	27	329
28	Owen Boxall (GBR)	D	93.03	143	148	~~151~~	30	173	178	~~183~~	29	326
29	Gábor Vaspöri (HUN)	D	93.67	140	145	~~148~~	32	175	~~180~~	~~180~~	30	320
30	Bence Simon (HUN)	D	88.39	~~130~~	~~130~~	130	33	160	~~165~~	~~165~~	31	290
—	İbrahim Arat (TUR)	B	93.42	~~160~~	160	~~163~~	20	~~195~~	~~195~~	~~196~~	—	—
—	Darwin Pirela (VEN)	D	91.80	150	~~155~~	~~155~~	26	—	—	—	—	—
—	Miika Antti-Roiko (FIN)	C	93.84	150	~~154~~	~~154~~	28	~~191~~	~~191~~	—	—	—
—	Douglas Santos (BRA)	C	93.81	~~145~~	~~145~~	~~145~~	—	185	~~190~~	—	26	—
—	Leho Pent (EST)	B	93.96	~~160~~	~~160~~	~~160~~	—	—	—	—	—	—
—	Adrian Zieliński (POL)	A	93.43	~~175~~	~~175~~	~~176~~	—	—	—	—	—	—
—	Yaroslav Chernyshov (UKR)	B	88.24	~~160~~	~~160~~	~~160~~	—	—	—	—	—	—
DQ	Vladimir Sedov (KAZ)	A	93.24	180	185	188	—	~~215~~	215	219	—	—
