= 2015 World Weightlifting Championships – Men's 94 kg =

The men's 94 kilograms event at the 2015 World Weightlifting Championships was held on 25 and 26 November 2015 in Houston, United States.

== Schedule ==
Date	Time	Event
25 November 2015	21:25	Group D
26 November 2015	08:00	Group C
26 November 2015	10:00	Group B
26 November 2015	12:55	Group A

== Medalists ==
Event	Gold		Silver		Bronze	
Snatch	Aurimas Didžbalis (LTU)	180 kg	Adrian Zieliński (POL)	177 kg	Vadzim Straltsou (BLR)	175 kg
Clean & Jerk	Vadzim Straltsou (BLR)	230 kg	Liu Hao (CHN)	219 kg	Adrian Zieliński (POL)	214 kg
Total	Vadzim Straltsou (BLR)	405 kg	Adrian Zieliński (POL)	391 kg	Dmytro Chumak (UKR)	386 kg

== Records ==
Prior to this competition, the existing world records were as follows.

World record	Snatch	Akakios Kakiasvilis (GRE)	188 kg	Athens, Greece	27 November 1999
World record	Clean & Jerk	~~Ilya Ilyin (KAZ)~~; Szymon Kołecki (POL)	~~233 kg~~ 232 kg	~~London, United Kingdom~~; Sofia, Bulgaria	~~4 August 2012~~; 29 April 2000
World record	Total	~~Ilya Ilyin (KAZ)~~; Akakios Kakiasvilis (GRE)	~~418 kg~~ 412 kg	~~London, United Kingdom~~; Athens, Greece	~~4 August 2012~~; 27 November 1999

- Ilya Ilyin's world records were rescinded in 2016.

== Results ==
Rank	Athlete	Group	Body weight	Snatch (kg)				Clean & Jerk (kg)				Total
Rank	Athlete	Group	Body weight	1	2	3	Rank	1	2	3	Rank	Total
1st place, gold medalist(s)	Vadzim Straltsou (BLR)	A	93.38	175	~~180~~	~~180~~	3rd place, bronze medalist(s)	220	230	~~234~~	1st place, gold medalist(s)	405
2nd place, silver medalist(s)	Adrian Zieliński (POL)	A	93.69	173	177	~~180~~	2nd place, silver medalist(s)	208	214	~~218~~	3rd place, bronze medalist(s)	391
3rd place, bronze medalist(s)	Dmytro Chumak (UKR)	A	93.74	171	175	~~178~~	4	206	211	~~217~~	4	386
4	Ali Hashemi (IRI)	A	92.28	166	173	~~175~~	5	201	~~207~~	207	5	380
5	Lesman Paredes (COL)	B	93.64	167	~~172~~	172	6	195	202	207	6	379
6	Tomasz Zieliński (POL)	A	93.83	170	~~174~~	~~174~~	7	205	~~212~~	~~212~~	10	375
7	Rovshan Fatullayev (AZE)	B	93.87	160	166	~~168~~	11	200	207	~~210~~	7	373
8	Ragab Abdelhay (EGY)	B	93.98	155	160	165	14	200	~~206~~	207	8	372
9	Jung Hyeon-seop (KOR)	B	93.06	165	~~170~~	~~170~~	12	205	~~210~~	—	9	370
10	Sarat Sumpradit (THA)	B	93.18	162	~~166~~	~~166~~	15	198	201	204	12	366
11	Kendrick Farris (USA)	B	93.27	158	162	165	13	198	~~203~~	~~204~~	13	363
12	Volodymyr Hoza (UKR)	B	93.36	166	~~171~~	~~171~~	10	192	197	~~202~~	14	363
13	Anatoliy Mushyk (ISR)	C	93.64	165	~~169~~	169	8	194	~~198~~	—	16	363
14	Park Han-woong (KOR)	B	92.61	152	—	—	21	190	200	204	11	356
15	Rauli Tsirekidze (GEO)	B	93.37	~~160~~	~~160~~	160	17	191	196	~~201~~	15	356
16	Žygimantas Stanulis (LTU)	B	93.36	160	~~164~~	~~164~~	16	180	191	~~195~~	18	351
17	David Matam (FRA)	C	93.87	151	155	158	19	185	190	193	17	351
18	Redon Manushi (FRA)	C	93.69	~~160~~	~~160~~	160	18	181	~~183~~	~~183~~	27	341
19	Herbys Márquez (VEN)	C	94.00	~~150~~	150	~~154~~	25	191	~~195~~	—	20	341
20	Farkhodbek Sobirov (UZB)	C	87.59	150	154	157	20	~~183~~	183	~~186~~	25	340
21	Rigoberto Pérez (MEX)	D	93.47	144	147	150	23	180	185	190	21	340
22	Sonny Webster (GBR)	C	93.32	147	151	~~154~~	22	~~184~~	184	188	22	339
23	Jiří Gasior (CZE)	C	93.67	~~147~~	147	150	24	~~183~~	183	~~188~~	26	333
24	David Samayoa (CAN)	D	92.23	145	148	~~150~~	26	175	180	~~182~~	28	328
25	Eero Retulainen (FIN)	D	93.37	143	~~148~~	~~148~~	29	177	—	—	29	320
26	Jin Cheng (TPE)	D	93.91	135	~~147~~	~~147~~	32	175	185	~~190~~	24	320
27	Muhammetnur Jannyýew (TKM)	D	93.17	140	~~145~~	145	28	170	~~175~~	~~177~~	31	315
28	Tanumafili Jungblut (ASA)	D	93.62	132	~~137~~	137	30	168	172	175	30	312
29	Forrester Osei (GHA)	D	93.60	127	~~132~~	132	33	160	165	170	32	302
30	Jeppe Nørgaard (DEN)	D	93.70	~~135~~	135	~~140~~	31	165	~~170~~	~~170~~	33	300
—	Aurimas Didžbalis (LTU)	A	93.21	~~180~~	~~180~~	180	1st place, gold medalist(s)	~~215~~	~~215~~	~~215~~	—	—
—	Jared Fleming (USA)	B	93.75	162	~~167~~	167	9	~~192~~	—	—	—	—
—	Gábor Vaspöri (HUN)	C	93.77	147	~~152~~	~~152~~	27	~~184~~	~~184~~	~~184~~	—	—
—	Hayrich Juliana (CUW)	D	93.34	125	~~127~~	~~127~~	34	~~158~~	~~158~~	~~158~~	—	—
—	Liu Hao (CHN)	A	93.87	~~173~~	~~173~~	~~173~~	—	~~215~~	~~215~~	219	2nd place, silver medalist(s)	—
—	Miika Antti-Roiko (FIN)	D	93.91	~~148~~	~~148~~	~~148~~	—	191	~~196~~	~~198~~	19	—
—	Víctor Quiñones (CUB)	C	93.60	~~155~~	~~155~~	~~155~~	—	185	~~190~~	~~190~~	23	—
DQ	Almas Uteshov (KAZ)	A	93.63	172	~~180~~	~~180~~	—	220	230	~~234~~	—	402
DQ	Zhassulan Kydyrbayev (KAZ)	A	93.74	178	~~183~~	~~183~~	—	221	~~231~~	~~231~~	—	399
DQ	Aliaksandr Venskel (BLR)	A	93.86	~~178~~	178	~~181~~	—	213	220	~~230~~	—	398
DQ	Aleksey Kosov (RUS)	A	93.24	175	~~181~~	181	—	200	~~210~~	~~210~~	—	381
DQ	Intigam Zairov (AZE)	B	93.74	165	170	173	—	201	207	~~211~~	—	380
