= Gábor Vaspöri =

Hungarian weightlifter

Personal information
- Nationality: Hungarian
- Born: 26 October 1983 (age 42) Szombathely
- Height: 1.78 m (5 ft 10 in)
- Weight: 93 kg (205 lb)

Sport
- Country: Hungary
- Sport: Weightlifting
- Event: 94 kg
- Updated on 14 October 2017

Gábor Vaspöri (born 26 October 1983 in Szombathely, Hungary) is a Hungarian weightlifter. His best result was 10th place at the 2014 European Weightlifting Championships in Tel Aviv.

== Major results ==
Year	Venue	Weight	Snatch (kg)				Clean & Jerk (kg)				Total	Rank
Year	Venue	Weight	1	2	3	Rank	1	2	3	Rank	Total	Rank
Representing Hungary
World Championships
2015	Houston, United States	94 kg	147	~~152~~	~~152~~	27	~~184~~	~~184~~	~~184~~	—	—	—
2014	Almaty, Kazakhstan	94 kg	140	145	~~148~~	33	175	~~180~~	~~180~~	31	320	30
2007	Chiang Mai, Thailand	105 kg	~~145~~	145	150	29	180	~~185~~	~~185~~	30	330	29
2005	Doha, Qatar	94 kg	~~142~~	142	146	23	~~175~~	~~175~~	~~178~~	—	—	—
European Championships
2017	Split, Croatia	94 kg	140	144	~~147~~	21	~~172~~	~~173~~	174	21	318	21
2016	Førde, Norway	94 kg	~~135~~	135	140	22	165	170	~~172~~	21	310	21
2015	(Georgia (country)) Tbilisi, Georgia	94 kg	144	149	~~152~~	13	~~180~~	180	184	12	333	12
2014	Tel Aviv, Israel	94 kg	146	150	~~153~~	12	~~184~~	184	186	9	336	10
2013	Tirana, Albania	94 kg	153	~~156~~	~~156~~	12	187	~~191~~	~~191~~	10	340	11
2008	Lignano Sabbiadoro, Italy	105 kg	~~143~~	143	148	18	177	~~182~~	~~182~~	16	325	16
2004	Kyiv, Ukraine	94 kg	155	~~160~~	160	17	~~195~~	195	~~202.5~~	15	355	14
