= Weightlifting at the 2017 Summer Universiade – Men's 94 kg =

Men's 94 kg at the Universiade
- Venues: Tamkang University Shao-Mo Memorial Gymnasium 7F
- Dates: 24 August 2017
- Competitors: 24 from 20 nations

Medalists
| 1st place, gold medalist(s) | | Egor Klimonov | Russia |
| 2nd place, silver medalist(s) | | Rustem Sybay | Kazakhstan |
| 3rd place, bronze medalist(s) | | Sarat Sumpradit | Thailand |

The men's 94 kg event at the 2017 Summer Universiade was held on 24 August at the Tamkang University Shao-Mo Memorial Gymnasium 7F.

== Records ==
Prior to this competition, the existing world and Universiade records were as follows.

- Initial records

| Category | | Nation | Athlete | Record | Place | Date | Meet |
|---|---|---|---|---|---|---|---|
| World record | Snatch | Greece | Akakios Kakiasvilis | 188 kg | Athens, Greece | 27 November 1999 | 1999 World Championships |
| World record | Clean & Jerk | Poland | Szymon Kołecki | 232 kg | Sofia, Bulgaria | 29 April 2000 | 2000 European Championships |
| World record | Total | Poland | Szymon Kołecki | 412 kg | Athens, Greece | 27 November 1999 | 1999 World Championships |
| Universiade records | Snatch | Russia (RUS) | Alexandr Ivanov | 181 kg | Kazan, Russia | 12 July 2013 | 2013 Summer Universiade |
| Universiade records | Clean & Jerk | Russia (RUS) | Alexandr Ivanov | 214 kg | Kazan, Russia | 12 July 2013 | 2013 Summer Universiade |
| Universiade records | Total | Russia (RUS) | Alexandr Ivanov | 395 kg | Kazan, Russia | 12 July 2013 | 2013 Summer Universiade |

- Broken records

| Category | | Nation | Athlete | Record | Place | Date |
|---|---|---|---|---|---|---|
| Universiade records | Clean & Jerk | Russia (RUS) | Egor Klimonov | 215 kg | New Taipei, Taiwan | 24 August 2017 |

== Results ==
| Rank | Athlete | Group | Body weight | Snatch (kg) | | | | Clean & Jerk (kg) | | | | Total |
| Rank | Athlete | Group | Body weight | 1 | 2 | 3 | Result | 1 | 2 | 3 | Result | Total |
|---|---|---|---|---|---|---|---|---|---|---|---|---|
| 1st place, gold medalist(s) | Egor Klimonov (RUS) | A | 93.84 | ~~166~~ | 166 | 168 | 168 | 211 | 215 | – | 215 UR | 383 |
| 2nd place, silver medalist(s) | Rustem Sybay (KAZ) | A | 93.87 | 165 | 170 | ~~173~~ | 170 | 212 | ~~215~~ | ~~215~~ | 212 | 382 |
| 3rd place, bronze medalist(s) | Sarat Sumpradit (THA) | A | 93.33 | 163 | ~~167~~ | 167 | 167 | 205 | ~~214~~ | 214 | 214 | 381 |
| 4 | Aurimas Didžbalis (LTU) | A | 93.48 | 168 | 175 | ~~182~~ | 175 | ~~203~~ | 205 | ~~211~~ | 205 | 380 |
| 5 | Žygimantas Stanulis (LTU) | A | 93.92 | 163 | 170 | ~~175~~ | 170 | ~~192~~ | 192 | ~~202~~ | 192 | 362 |
| 6 | Yauheni Tsikhantsou (BLR) | A | 93.92 | 165 | ~~170~~ | ~~171~~ | 165 | 197 | ~~205~~ | ~~205~~ | 197 | 362 |
| 7 | Mohammad Zarei (IRI) | A | 93.14 | 160 | 165 | ~~168~~ | 165 | 196 | ~~202~~ | ~~202~~ | 196 | 361 |
| 8 | Boady Robert Santavy (CAN) | A | 91.48 | 156 | 161 | ~~165~~ | 161 | 191 | ~~196~~ | 196 | 196 | 357 |
| 9 | Nicolae Onica (ROU) | A | 93.58 | 152 | 156 | ~~161~~ | 156 | 192 | 200 | ~~208~~ | 200 | 356 |
| 10 | Won Jong-beom (KOR) | A | 93.68 | 153 | ~~158~~ | ~~158~~ | 153 | ~~195~~ | ~~197~~ | 197 | 197 | 350 |
| 11 | Artem Okulov (RUS) | A | 91.44 | 155 | 160 | – | 160 | 186 | – | – | 186 | 346 |
| 12 | Eero Eljas Retulainen (FIN) | B | 93.94 | ~~147~~ | 147 | 151 | 151 | 184 | 190 | ~~195~~ | 190 | 341 |
| 13 | Adrian Tomasz Pawlicki (POL) | B | 91.56 | ~~145~~ | 145 | ~~148~~ | 145 | 180 | ~~185~~ | 185 | 185 | 330 |
| 14 | Ichiro Yara (JPN) | B | 93.82 | 137 | 143 | 146 | 146 | 170 | 176 | 182 | 182 | 328 |
| 15 | Gabriel Dagenais (CAN) | B | 93.43 | 141 | ~~146~~ | ~~146~~ | 141 | ~~175~~ | 175 | 185 | 185 | 326 |
| 16 | Lo Hao-jhih (TPE) | B | 93.83 | 140 | ~~150~~ | ~~150~~ | 140 | 180 | ~~190~~ | ~~190~~ | 180 | 320 |
| 17 | Simon Kastbjerg Darville (DEN) | B | 93.82 | 133 | 139 | 143 | 143 | 163 | 170 | ~~175~~ | 170 | 313 |
| 18 | Pirguly Pirgulyyev (TKM) | B | 85.05 | 130 | ~~135~~ | ~~135~~ | 130 | 150 | ~~155~~ | 157 | 157 | 287 |
| 19 | Ole Lykke Thomsen (DEN) | B | 93.25 | 112 | 116 | 120 | 120 | ~~144~~ | ~~148~~ | 148 | 148 | 268 |
| 20 | Jure Škedelj (SLO) | B | 93.76 | 112 | 117 | ~~121~~ | 117 | ~~147~~ | 148 | ~~152~~ | 148 | 265 |
| 21 | Rehman Naveed Malik (PAK) | B | 90.15 | 110 | ~~115~~ | ~~117~~ | 110 | 130 | 140 | ~~145~~ | 140 | 250 |
| 22 | Kurk Kuffka Abala (PHI) | B | 88.01 | ~~95~~ | 95 | ~~100~~ | 95 | 115 | ~~122~~ | ~~125~~ | 115 | 210 |
| 23 | Vinothkumar Udayakumar (SRI) | B | 85.05 | 86 | ~~90~~ | ~~90~~ | 86 | 108 | 115 | ~~118~~ | 115 | 201 |
| | Lesman Paredes (COL) | A | 92.43 | | | | | | | | | DNS |
