= Dmytro Chumak =

Dmytro Chumak may refer to:

- Dmytro Chumak (fencer) (born 1980), Ukrainian épée fencer
- Dmytro Chumak (weightlifter) (born 1990), Ukrainian weightlifter
