= Weightlifting at the 2016 Summer Olympics – Men's 94 kg =

Men's 94 kg at the Games of the XXXI Olympiad
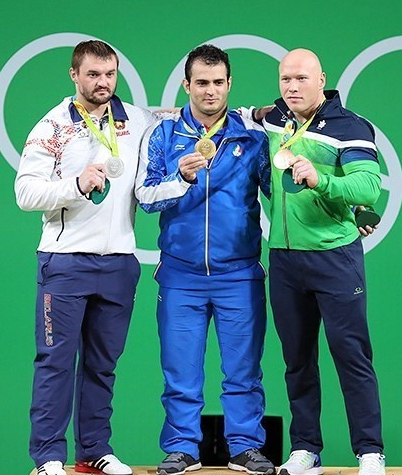
- L-R: Straltsou, Moradi, Didžbalis
- Venue: Riocentro
- Date: 13 August 2016
- Competitors: 20 from 17 nations
- Winning total: 403 kg

Medalists
1st place, gold medalist(s)		Sohrab Moradi	Iran
2nd place, silver medalist(s)		Vadzim Straltsou	Belarus
3rd place, bronze medalist(s)		Aurimas Didžbalis	Lithuania

The Men's 94 kg weightlifting competitions at the 2016 Summer Olympics in Rio de Janeiro took place on 13 August at the Pavilion 2 of Riocentro.

== Schedule ==
All times are Time in Brazil (UTC-03:00)

Date	Time	Event
13 August 2016	15:30	Group B
13 August 2016	19:00	Group A

== Records ==
Prior to this competition, the existing world and Olympic records were as follows.

World record	Snatch	Akakios Kakiasvilis (GRE)	188 kg	Athens, Greece	27 November 1999
World record	Clean & Jerk	Szymon Kołecki (POL)	232 kg	Sofia, Bulgaria	29 April 2000
World record	Total	Akakios Kakiasvilis (GRE)	412 kg	Athens, Greece	27 November 1999
Olympic record	Snatch	Kourosh Bagheri (IRI)	187 kg	Sydney, Australia	24 September 2000
Olympic record	Clean & Jerk	Szymon Kołecki (POL)	224 kg	Beijing, China	17 August 2008
Olympic record	Total	Milen Dobrev (BUL)	407 kg	Athens, Greece	23 August 2004

== Results ==
Rank	Athlete	Group	Body weight	Snatch (kg)				Clean & Jerk (kg)				Total
Rank	Athlete	Group	Body weight	1	2	3	Result	1	2	3	Result	Total
1st place, gold medalist(s)	Sohrab Moradi (IRI)	A	93.64	~~178~~	178	182	182	221	~~234~~	~~234~~	221	403
2nd place, silver medalist(s)	Vadzim Straltsou (BLR)	A	93.70	175	~~179~~	~~180~~	175	220	~~230~~	~~230~~	220	395
3rd place, bronze medalist(s)	Aurimas Didžbalis (LTU)	A	92.42	~~177~~	~~177~~	177	177	210	215	~~223~~	215	392
4	Sarat Sumpradit (THA)	A	93.05	170	175	177	177	205	210	213	213	390
5	Ragab Abdelhay (EGY)	A	93.45	165	170	174	174 AF	205	~~211~~	213	213	387 AF
6	Dmytro Chumak (UKR)	A	93.66	~~174~~	174	~~177~~	174	~~213~~	213	~~220~~	213	387
7	Ali Hashemi (IRI)	A	93.10	~~172~~	~~173~~	173	173	210	~~220~~	~~220~~	210	383
8	Aliaksandr Bersanau (BLR)	A	93.57	167	173	~~177~~	173	208	~~214~~	~~215~~	208	381
9	Volodymyr Hoza (UKR)	B	93.66	165	170	~~174~~	170	195	200	205	205	375
10	Park Han-woong (KOR)	B	92.39	160	~~165~~	165	165	202	~~210~~	~~210~~	202	367
11	Kendrick Farris (USA)	B	93.24	160	~~165~~	~~165~~	160	197	~~201~~	~~205~~	197	357
12	Kévin Bouly (FRA)	B	93.76	145	150	155	155	180	185	190	190	345
13	Simplice Ribouem (AUS)	B	93.25	145	150	155	155	185	~~191~~	~~191~~	185	340
14	Sonny Webster (GBR)	B	93.58	~~148~~	148	~~151~~	148	185	~~190~~	~~190~~	185	333
15	Cristopher Pavón (HON)	B	93.26	~~140~~	140	145	145	180	~~185~~	~~185~~	180	325
16	Petit Minkoumba (CMR)	B	91.61	140	~~145~~	~~145~~	140	165	~~170~~	~~170~~	165	305
17	James Adede (KEN)	B	92.89	112	116	~~123~~	116	140	~~146~~	~~146~~	140	256
–	Tanumafili Jungblut (ASA)	B	92.91	~~141~~	~~141~~	~~141~~	–	–	–	–	–	DNF

Adrian Zieliński (POL) and Tomasz Zieliński (POL) were on the start list, but were ejected from the Games after failing a drugs test in Polish national championships.
