= 2013 World Weightlifting Championships – Women's +75 kg =

The women's competition in the +75 kg division was held on 25–26 October 2013 in Centennial Hall, Wrocław, Poland.

== Schedule ==
Date	Time	Event
25 October 2013	14:00	Group B
26 October 2013	19:55	Group A

== Medalists ==
Event	Gold		Silver		Bronze	
Snatch	Zhou Lulu (CHN)	146 kg	Tatiana Kashirina (RUS)	142 kg	Chitchanok Pulsabsakul (THA)	131 kg
Clean & Jerk	Tatiana Kashirina (RUS)	190 kg	Zhou Lulu (CHN)	182 kg	Chitchanok Pulsabsakul (THA)	160 kg
Total	Tatiana Kashirina (RUS)	332 kg	Zhou Lulu (CHN)	328 kg	Chitchanok Pulsabsakul (THA)	291 kg

== Records ==
Prior to this competition, the existing world records were as follows.

World Record	Snatch	Tatiana Kashirina (RUS)	151 kg	London, United Kingdom	5 August 2012
World Record	Clean & Jerk	Meng Suping (CHN)	188 kg	Eilat, Israel	9 November 2012
World Record	Total	Zhou Lulu (CHN)	333 kg	London, United Kingdom	5 August 2012

== Results ==
Rank	Athlete	Group	Body weight	Snatch (kg)				Clean & Jerk (kg)				Total
Rank	Athlete	Group	Body weight	1	2	3	Rank	1	2	3	Rank	Total
1st place, gold medalist(s)	Tatiana Kashirina (RUS)	A	104.32	142	~~147~~	~~147~~	2nd place, silver medalist(s)	180	190	~~192~~	1st place, gold medalist(s)	332
2nd place, silver medalist(s)	Zhou Lulu (CHN)	A	133.02	135	143	146	1st place, gold medalist(s)	175	182	—	2nd place, silver medalist(s)	328
3rd place, bronze medalist(s)	Chitchanok Pulsabsakul (THA)	A	125.12	121	127	131	3rd place, bronze medalist(s)	155	~~160~~	160	3rd place, bronze medalist(s)	291
4	Yaniuska Espinosa (VEN)	B	107.20	106	112	115	4	133	~~140~~	140	5	255
5	Naryury Pérez (VEN)	B	96.62	103	106	109	7	135	140	142	4	251
6	Oliba Nieve (ECU)	A	91.28	~~110~~	110	~~115~~	5	135	~~140~~	~~140~~	7	245
7	Chioma Amaechi (USA)	A	103.54	100	~~105~~	105	9	~~136~~	136	139	6	244
8	Tania Mascorro (MEX)	A	107.58	109	~~113~~	~~113~~	8	130	135	~~137~~	8	244
9	Mami Shimamoto (JPN)	B	102.41	102	106	110	6	125	130	133	10	243
10	Shelbie Serpan (USA)	B	128.57	~~100~~	100	~~105~~	12	130	~~135~~	135	9	235
11	Sabina Bagińska (POL)	B	103.28	98	~~102~~	102	10	126	~~130~~	~~130~~	12	228
12	Gladis Bueno (MEX)	B	119.59	96	~~102~~	~~102~~	13	126	~~131~~	131	11	227
13	Nur Jannah Batrisyah (MAS)	B	106.66	95	~~100~~	100	11	118	124	126	13	226
14	Astrid Camposeco (GUA)	B	91.39	85	90	~~95~~	14	110	~~115~~	115	14	205
DQ	Katsiaryna Shkuratava (BLR)	A	117.56	120	126	130	—	156	161	~~170~~	—	—

== New records ==
Clean & Jerk	190 kg	Tatiana Kashirina (RUS)	WR
