= Dmytro Chumak (weightlifter) =

Ukrainian weightlifter (born 1990)

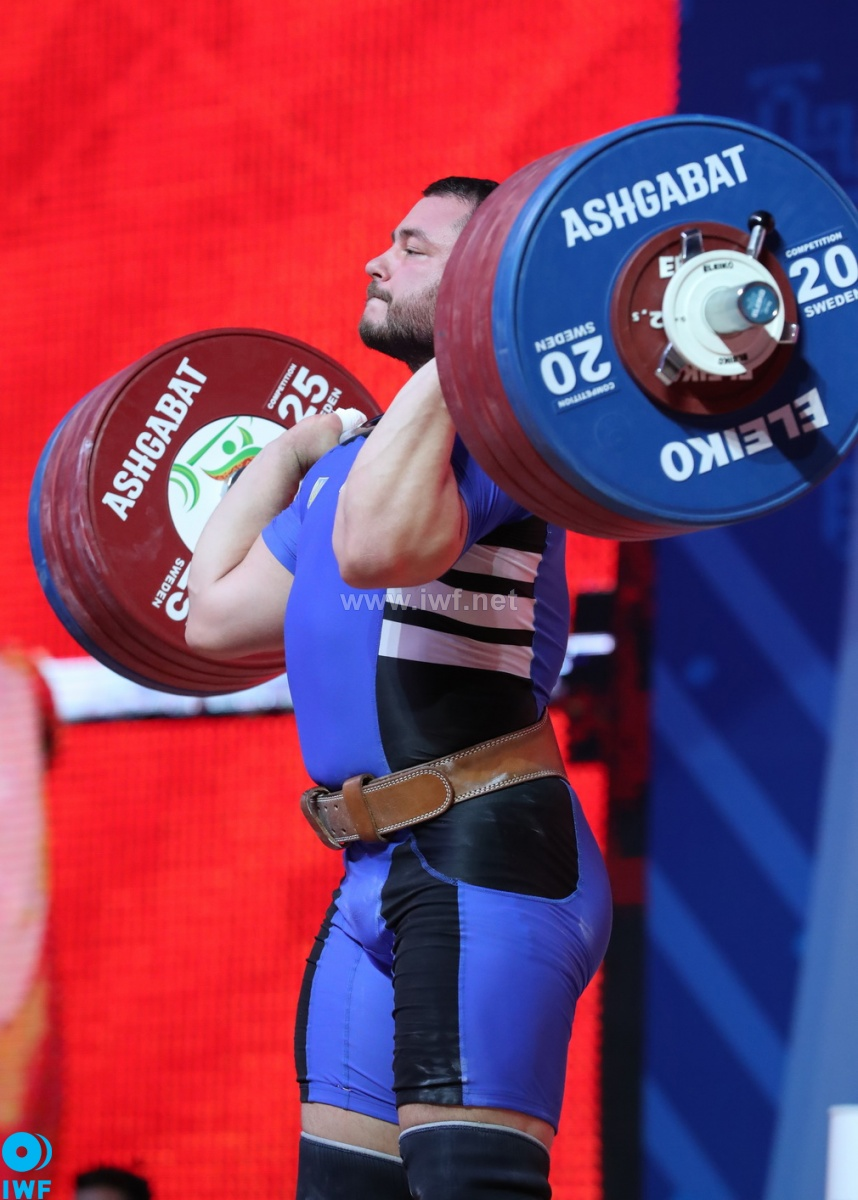
- Chumak at the 2018 IWF World Championships

Personal information
- Born: 11 July 1990 (age 36) Skadovsk, Ukrainian SSR, Soviet Union
- Height: 1.75 m (5 ft 9 in)
- Weight: 107.56 kg (237 lb)

Sport
- Country: Ukraine
- Sport: Weightlifting
- Event: –109 kg

Achievements and titles
- Personal bests: Snatch: 181 kg (2021); Clean and jerk: 226 kg (2021); Total: 407 kg (2021)
Medal record
Men's weightlifting
Representing Ukraine
World Championships
Silver medal – second place	2018 Ashgabat	–102 kg
Bronze medal – third place	2015 Houston	–94 kg
European Championships
Gold medal – first place	2017 Split	–94 kg
Gold medal – first place	2019 Batumi	–102 kg
Gold medal – first place	2021 Moscow	–109 kg

Dmytro Vitaliyovych Chumak (Ukrainian: Дмитро Віталійович Чумак; born 11 July 1990) is a Ukrainian weightlifting medalist who competes in the 102 kg weight division. He won a bronze medal at the 2015 World Championships and placed sixth at the 2016 Olympics.

== Major results ==
Year	Venue	Weight	Snatch (kg)				Clean & Jerk (kg)				Total	Rank
Year	Venue	Weight	1	2	3	Rank	1	2	3	Rank	Total	Rank
Olympic Games
2016	Rio de Janeiro, Brazil	94 kg	~~174~~	174	~~177~~	6	~~213~~	213	~~220~~	6	387	6
World Championships
2014	Almaty, Kazakhstan	94 kg	173	~~177~~	~~178~~	6	205	210	~~215~~	8	383	8
2015	Houston, United States	94 kg	171	175	~~178~~	4	206	211	~~217~~	4	386	3rd place, bronze medalist(s)
2018	Ashgabat, Turkmenistan	102 kg	171	176	~~179~~	3rd place, bronze medalist(s)	210	217	~~221~~	4	393	2nd place, silver medalist(s)
2019	Pattaya, Thailand	102 kg	~~176~~	~~176~~	176	4	213	~~217~~	217	3rd place, bronze medalist(s)	393	4
European Championships
2017	Split, Croatia	94 kg	170	174	~~178~~	2nd place, silver medalist(s)	207	210	214	1st place, gold medalist(s)	388	1st place, gold medalist(s)
2019	(Georgia (country)) Batumi, Georgia	102 kg	171	~~175~~	175	1st place, gold medalist(s)	210	216	~~229~~	1st place, gold medalist(s)	391	1st place, gold medalist(s)
2021	Moscow, Russia	109 kg	~~181~~	~~181~~	181	4	220	~~226~~	226	1st place, gold medalist(s)	407	1st place, gold medalist(s)
World cup
2020	Rome, Italy	109 kg	176	180	~~183~~	3rd place, bronze medalist(s)	216	220	225	1st place, gold medalist(s)	405	1st place, gold medalist(s)
British International Open
2019	(United Kingdom) Coventry, England	109 kg	165	170	~~175~~	1	200	210	~~215~~	1	380	1st place, gold medalist(s)
