= 2018 World Weightlifting Championships – Men's 102 kg =

The men's 102 kilograms competition at the 2018 World Weightlifting Championships was held on 8 November 2018.

== Schedule ==
Date	Time	Event
8 November 2018	12:00	Group B
8 November 2018	19:55	Group A

== Medalists ==
Event	Gold		Silver		Bronze	
Snatch	Akbar Djuraev (UZB)	180 kg	Ali Hashemi (IRI)	179 kg	Dmytro Chumak (UKR)	176 kg
Clean & Jerk	Reza Beiranvand (IRI)	218 kg	Dmytro Chumak (UKR)	217 kg	Ali Hashemi (IRI)	217 kg
Total	Ali Hashemi (IRI)	396 kg	Dmytro Chumak (UKR)	393 kg	Reza Beiranvand (IRI)	393 kg

== Records ==
Prior to this competition, the existing world records were as follows.

World Record	Snatch	World Standard	191 kg	—	1 November 2018
World Record	Clean & Jerk	World Standard	231 kg	—	1 November 2018
World Record	Total	World Standard	412 kg	—	1 November 2018

== Results ==
Rank	Athlete	Group	Snatch (kg)				Clean & Jerk (kg)				Total
Rank	Athlete	Group	1	2	3	Rank	1	2	3	Rank	Total
1st place, gold medalist(s)	Ali Hashemi (IRI)	A	172	177	179	2nd place, silver medalist(s)	211	217	~~221~~	3rd place, bronze medalist(s)	396
2nd place, silver medalist(s)	Dmytro Chumak (UKR)	A	171	176	~~179~~	3rd place, bronze medalist(s)	210	217	~~221~~	2nd place, silver medalist(s)	393
3rd place, bronze medalist(s)	Reza Beiranvand (IRI)	A	166	172	175	4	~~207~~	208	218	1st place, gold medalist(s)	393
4	Akbar Djuraev (UZB)	A	173	178 JWR	180 JWR	1st place, gold medalist(s)	200	207	212	4	392 JWR
5	Irakli Chkheidze (GEO)	A	164	~~168~~	168	5	~~207~~	208	~~213~~	5	376
6	Kostiantyn Reva (UKR)	A	~~162~~	162	167	7	~~201~~	206	~~213~~	6	373
7	Maksim Sheiko (RUS)	A	161	~~166~~	167	8	~~200~~	200	~~205~~	7	367
8	Matej Kováč (SVK)	A	163	~~168~~	~~169~~	10	193	198	~~205~~	8	361
9	Alexandr Zaichikov (KAZ)	A	~~165~~	165	~~170~~	9	~~195~~	195	—	10	360
10	Taro Tanaka (JPN)	A	160	167	~~173~~	6	~~190~~	190	~~195~~	13	357
11	Arnas Šidiškis (LTU)	B	~~155~~	~~155~~	155	11	184	~~189~~	189	14	344
12	Koriata Petelo (SAM)	B	145	150	~~155~~	13	185	193	~~201~~	11	343
13	Javier Azcatl (MEX)	B	145	~~148~~	~~148~~	16	190	195	~~201~~	9	340
14	Rigoberto Pérez (MEX)	B	143	147	150	14	183	188	~~191~~	15	338
15	Petunu Opeloge (SAM)	B	140	145	~~150~~	17	180	185	190	12	335
16	Patrik Krywult (CZE)	B	147	151	~~155~~	12	~~176~~	176	~~183~~	17	327
17	Hannes Keskitalo (FIN)	B	140	~~146~~	~~146~~	18	~~185~~	~~185~~	185	16	325
18	Ruben Burger (RSA)	B	125	~~130~~	130	19	~~155~~	157	~~163~~	18	287
—	Owen Boxall (GBR)	B	148	~~152~~	~~154~~	15	~~183~~	~~183~~	—	—	—
—	Ilya Ilyin (KAZ)	A	—	—	—	—	—	—	—	—	—
DQ	Žygimantas Stanulis (LTU)	B	140	~~150~~	~~150~~	—	155	165	—	—	—
