= Ali Hashemi (weightlifter) =

Iranian weightlifter (born 1991)

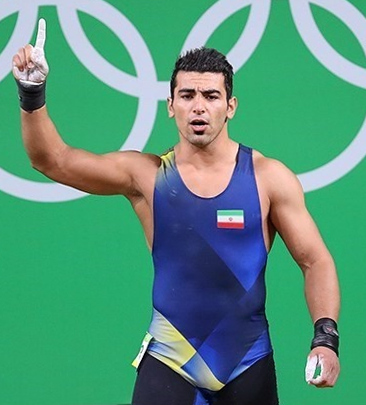
- Hashemi at the 2016 Summer Olympics

Personal information
- Native name: علی هاشمی
- Nationality: Iranian
- Born: 1 November 1991 (age 34) Ilam, Iran
- Height: 1.78 m (5 ft 10 in)
- Weight: 101.72 kg (224 lb)

Sport
- Country: Iran
- Sport: Weightlifting
- Event: –109 kg

Achievements and titles
- Personal bests: Snatch: 184 kg (2018); Clean and jerk: 225 kg (2019); Total: 405 kg (2019)
Medal record
Representing Iran
World Championships
Gold medal – first place	2017 Anaheim	105 kg
Gold medal – first place	2018 Ashgabat	102 kg
Asian Games
Bronze medal – third place	2018 Jakarta	105 kg
Asian Championships
Gold medal – first place	2016 Tashkent	94 kg
Bronze medal – third place	2015 Phuket	94 kg
Bronze medal – third place	2017 Ashgabat	105 kg
Bronze medal – third place	2019 Ningbo	109 kg

Ali Hashemi (Persian: علی هاشمی; born 1 November 1991) is an Iranian weightlifter, Olympian, and two-time world champion competing in the 94 kg, and 105 kg category until 2018 and 102 kg starting in 2018 after the International Weightlifting Federation reorganized the categories.

== Career ==
He won the bronze medal in the Men's 94 kg weight class at the 2015 Asian Weightlifting Championships.

== Major results ==
Year	Venue	Weight	Snatch (kg)				Clean & Jerk (kg)				Total	Rank
Year	Venue	Weight	1	2	3	Rank	1	2	3	Rank	Total	Rank
Olympic Games
2016	Rio de Janeiro, Brazil	94 kg	~~172~~	~~173~~	173	7	210	~~220~~	~~220~~	7	383	7
2021	Tokyo, Japan	109 kg	177	181	184	5	~~226~~	~~226~~	~~228~~	--	--	--
World Championships
2015	Houston, United States	94 kg	166	173	~~175~~	5	201	~~207~~	207	5	380	4
2017	Anaheim, United States	105 kg	178	183	~~186~~	1st place, gold medalist(s)	215	~~221~~	221	3rd place, bronze medalist(s)	404	1st place, gold medalist(s)
2018	Ashgabat, Turkmenistan	102 kg	172	177	179	2nd place, silver medalist(s)	211	217	~~221~~	3rd place, bronze medalist(s)	396	1st place, gold medalist(s)
Asian Games
2018	Jakarta, Indonesia	105 kg	177	181	184	2	219	~~224~~	~~224~~	4	403	3rd place, bronze medalist(s)
Asian Championships
2015	Phuket, Thailand	94 kg	165	168	~~174~~	1st place, gold medalist(s)	202	208	~~211~~	4	376	3rd place, bronze medalist(s)
2016	Tashkent, Uzbekistan	94 kg	165	170	174	1st place, gold medalist(s)	200	~~206~~	~~208~~	2nd place, silver medalist(s)	374	1st place, gold medalist(s)
2017	Ashgabat, Turkmenistan	105 kg	~~165~~	171	~~177~~	4	196	205	213	3rd place, bronze medalist(s)	384	3rd place, bronze medalist(s)
2019	Ningbo, China	109 kg	180	~~185~~	~~186~~	4	~~220~~	225	~~231~~	1st place, gold medalist(s)	405	3rd place, bronze medalist(s)
Fajr cup
2016	Tehran, Iran	94 kg	170	173	~~177~~	2nd place, silver medalist(s)	201	212	~~220~~	2nd place, silver medalist(s)	385	2nd place, silver medalist(s)
2019	Tehran, Iran	109 kg	175	~~180~~	182	1st place, gold medalist(s)	215	222	~~232~~	3rd place, bronze medalist(s)	404	1st place, gold medalist(s)
