= Vadzim Straltsou =

Belarusian weightlifter (born 1986)

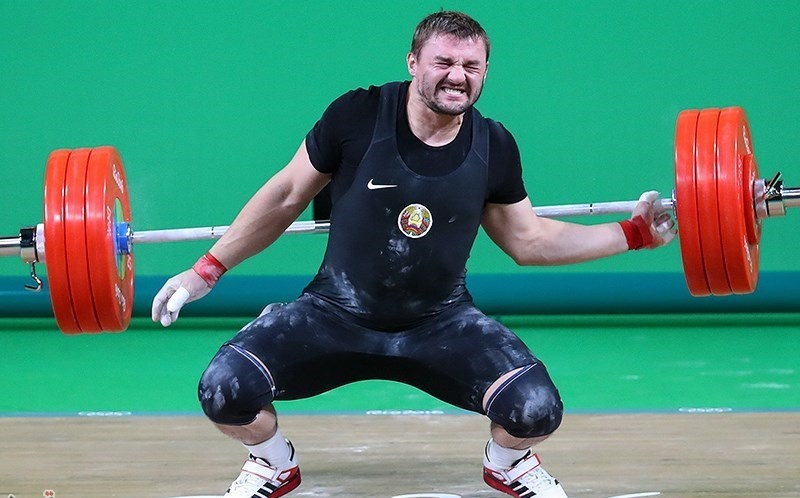
- Vadzim Straltsou at 2016 Summer Olympics

Personal information
- Nationality: Belarusian
- Born: 30 April 1986 (age 40) Mogilev, Byelorussian SSR, Soviet Union
- Height: 1.72 m (5 ft 7 1/2 in)
- Weight: 94 kg (207 lb)

Sport
- Country: Belarus
- Sport: Weightlifting
- Event(s): –85 kg, -94 kg
- Club: Dynamo Mahilyow
Medal record
Summer Olympic Games
| Silver medal – second place | 2016 Rio de Janeiro | -94 kg |
World Championships
| Gold medal – first place | 2015 Houston | –94 kg |
| Bronze medal – third place | 2007 Chiang Mai | –85 kg |
| Bronze medal – third place | 2014 Almaty | –94 kg |
European Championships
| Bronze medal – third place | 2007 Strasbourg | –85 kg |
| Bronze medal – third place | 2019 Batumi | –102 kg |

Vadzim Mikalayevich Straltsou (Belarusian: Вадзім Мікалаевіч Стральцоў; Łacinka: Vadzim Mikałajevič Stralcoŭ; born 30 April 1986) is a Belarusian weightlifter. Competing in men's 94 kg, he is the 2015 World champion and 2016 Olympic silver medalist.

== Career ==
In 2006, Straltsou dominated the 85 kg class by winning the gold medal at the Junior World Weightlifting Championships in Hangzhou, China. He took bronze at the 2007 World Championships in Chiang Mai.

Straltsou represented Belarus at the 2008 Summer Olympics in Beijing, competing in the men's light heavyweight category along with his compatriot Andrei Rybakou, who eventually won the silver medal. He did not finish the event, after failing to lift a snatch of 170 kg in three attempts.

Competing in men's 94 kg, Straltsou won gold at the 2015 World Championships in Houston. He was awarded the silver medal in the men's -94 kg event at the 2016 Summer Olympics in Rio de Janeiro.
