= Zhassulan Kydyrbayev =

Kazakhstani weightlifter (born 1992)

Personal information
- Full name: Zhassulan Kydyrbayev
- Nationality: Kazakh
- Born: 28 September 1992 (age 33) Almaty, Kazakhstan

Sport
- Country: Kazakhstan
- Sport: Weightlifting
- Event: –94 kg
Medal record
World Championships
Gold medal – first place	2014 Almaty	–94 kg
Disqualified	2015 Houston	–94 kg

Zhassulan Kydyrbayev (Kazakh: Қыдырбаев Жасұлан; born 28 September 1992) is a Kazakh weightlifter.

He achieved a snatch of 179 kg and a clean and jerk of 229 kg, securing a gold medal total of 408 kg at the 2014 World Weightlifting Championships in his home town of Almaty. Kydyrbayev had come back from a two-year doping ban only three days prior. He had served a period of ineligibility from 11 November 2012 to 11 November 2014 after testing positive for the anabolic steroid stanozolol.
