= Reza Beiranvand =

Iranian weightlifter (born 1997)

Personal information
- Nationality: Iranian
- Born: 1 April 1997 (age 29)

Sport
- Country: Iran
- Sport: Weightlifting
- Event: –102 kg
- Club: Borujerd Weightlifting Team

Achievements and titles
- Personal bests: Snatch: 175 kg (2018); Clean and jerk: 218 kg (2018); Total: 393 kg (2018)
Medal record
World Championships
Bronze medal – third place	2018 Ashgabat	102 kg
Asian Championships
Gold medal – first place	2019 Ningbo	102 kg
Islamic Solidarity Games
Gold medal – first place	2021 Konya	96 kg S
Gold medal – first place	2021 Konya	96 kg C&J
Gold medal – first place	2021 Konya	96 kg T (Note: At the 2021 Islamic Solidarity Games, medals from the snatch, clean & jerk and total are calculated separately and are all included in the medal table.)

Reza Beiranvand (Persian: رضا بیرالوند, born 1 April 1997) wrongly known as Reza Beiralvand is an Iranian weightlifter.

He participated at the 2018 World Weightlifting Championships, winning a medal.

== Major results ==
Year	Venue	Weight	Snatch (kg)				Clean & Jerk (kg)				Total	Rank
Year	Venue	Weight	1	2	3	Rank	1	2	3	Rank	Total	Rank
World Championships
2018	Ashgabat, Turkmenistan	102 kg	166	172	175	4	~~207~~	208	218	1st place, gold medalist(s)	393	3rd place, bronze medalist(s)
Asian Championships
2016	Tashkent, Uzbekistan	94 kg	160	165	~~170~~	5	190	~~198~~	~~198~~	5	355	5
2019	Ningbo, China	102 kg	~~168~~	169	173	1st place, gold medalist(s)	205	216	--	1st place, gold medalist(s)	389	1st place, gold medalist(s)
Islamic Solidarity Games
2022	Konya, Turkey	96 kg				1st place, gold medalist(s)				1st place, gold medalist(s)	361	1st place, gold medalist(s)
