= Chitchanok Pulsabsakul =

Thai weightlifter (born 1993)

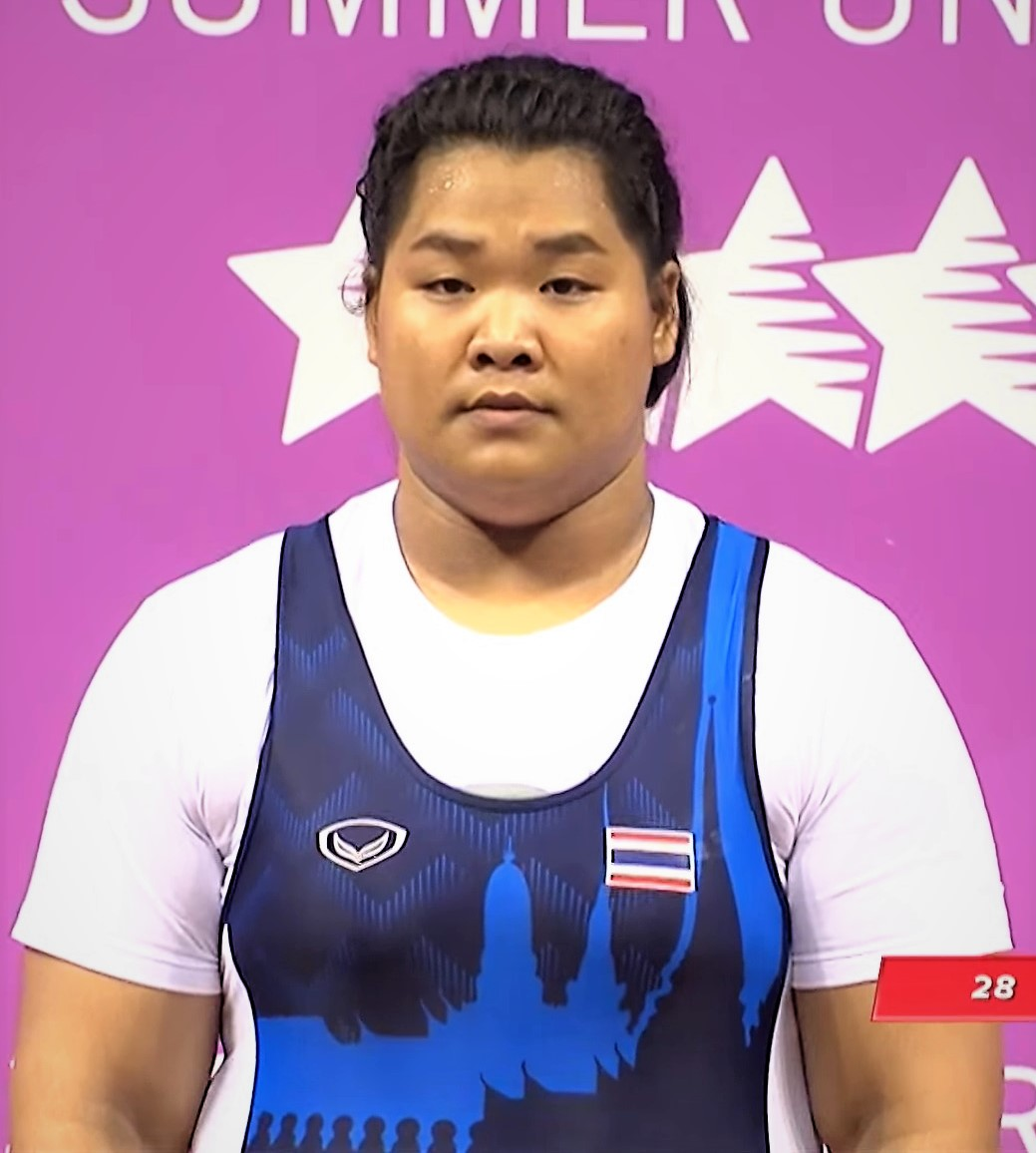
- Pulsabsakul at 2017 Summer Universiade

Medal record

Women's weightlifting

Representing Thailand

World Championships
Bronze medal – third place	2013 Wrocław	+75 kg
Bronze medal – third place	2014 Almaty	+75 kg

Asian Championships
Bronze medal – third place	2015 Phuket	+75 kg

Chitchanok Pulsabsakul (born 4 November 1993) is a Thai weightlifter. She competed at the 2013 World Championships in the Women's +75 kg, winning the bronze medal.

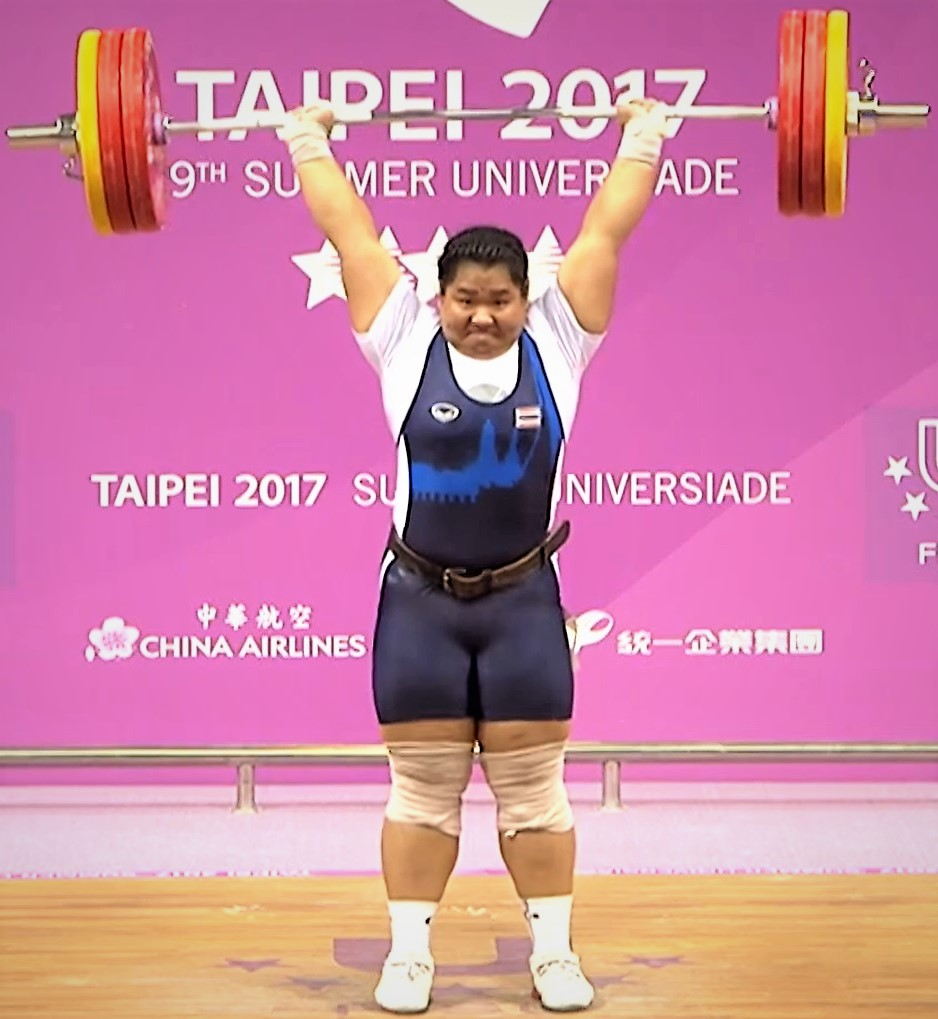
Chitchanok Pulsabsakul at 2017 Summer Universiade

== Doping ==
Pulsabsakul served a two-year doping ban from 6 July 2011 to 6 July 2013 after testing positive for Methandienone. In January 2019 she was issued a four-year doping ban until January 2023 after testing positive for 5a- androstane-3a, 17 b-diol (5aAdiol) and 5b-androstane-3a, 17 b-diol (5bAdiol).
