= Katsiaryna Shkuratava =

Belarusian weightlifter

Medal record

Representing Belarus

Women's Weightlifting

World Championships
Disqualified	2013 Wrocław	+75 kg

Katsiaryna Shkuratava (born 10 September 1987) is a Belarusian weightlifter. She competed at the 2013 World Championships in the Women's +75 kg, winning the Bronze medal but later lost medal and was banned from international competition by the International Weightlifting Federation for use of anabolic steroid Stanozolol.
