= Vadzim Likharad =

Belarusian weightlifter (born 1993)

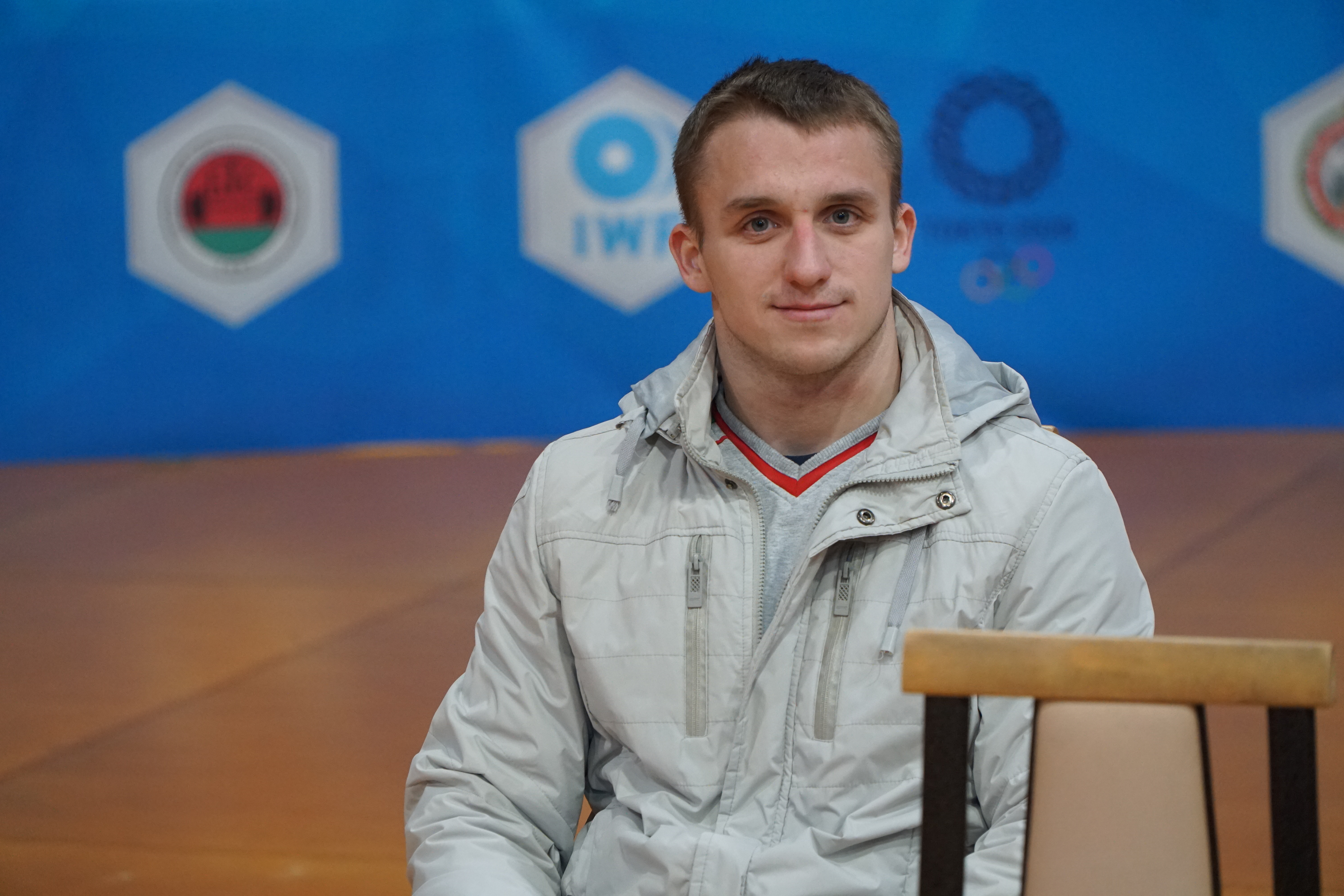

Personal information
- Nationality: Belarusian
- Born: 6 September 1993 (age 32)
- Weight: 72.79 kg (160 lb)

Sport
- Country: Belarus
- Sport: Weightlifting
- Event: –73 kg
Medal record
Men's weightlifting
Representing Belarus
World Championships
Bronze medal – third place	2018 Ashgabat	–73 kg
European Championships
Bronze medal – third place	2019 Batumi	–73 kg

Vadzim Likharad (born 6 September 1993) is a Belarusian weightlifter.

He participated at the 2018 World Weightlifting Championships, winning a medal. In 2020 he tested positive for a Dehydrochoromethyl-testosterone metabolite and is banned until 2024 by the International Weightlifting Federation.
