= Petr Asayonak =

Belarusian weightlifter (born 1993)

Personal information
- Nationality: Belarusian
- Born: 27 February 1993 (age 33)
- Height: 1.65 m (5 ft 5 in)
- Weight: 84 kg (185 lb)

Sport
- Country: Belarus
- Sport: Weightlifting
Medal record
Representing Belarus
European Championships
Silver medal – second place	2019 Batumi	–81 kg
Silver medal – second place	2021 Moscow	–96 kg

Petr Asayonak (born 27 February 1993) is a Belarusian Olympic weightlifter. He qualified for the 2016 Summer Olympics.

== Results ==
Year	Event	Weight	Snatch (kg)	Clean & Jerk (kg)	Total (kg)	Rank
2012	European Junior Championships	77 kg	152	182	334	4
2013	European Junior Championships	77 kg	153	175	328	2
2014	World Championships	77 kg	159	189	348	4
2015	World Championships	85 kg	167	196	363	6
2023	IWF Grand Prix	89 kg	162	206	368	1
