= 2014 World Weightlifting Championships =

International weightlifting competition

2014 World Championships
- Host city: Almaty, Kazakhstan
- Dates: 8–16 November
- Main venue: Baluan Sholak Sports Palace

The 2014 World Weightlifting Championships were held in Baluan Sholak Sports Palace, Almaty, Kazakhstan. The event took place from November 8 to 16, 2014.

== Medal summary ==
=== Men ===
Event	Gold		Silver		Bronze	
56 kg
Snatch	Thạch Kim Tuấn; Vietnam	135 kg	Li Fabin; China	134 kg	Long Qingquan; China	133 kg
Clean & Jerk	Om Yun-chol; North Korea	168 kg	Thạch Kim Tuấn; Vietnam	161 kg	Long Qingquan; China	160 kg
Total	Om Yun-chol; North Korea	296 kg	Thạch Kim Tuấn; Vietnam	296 kg	Long Qingquan; China	293 kg
62 kg
Snatch	Kim Un-guk; North Korea	150 kg	Ding Jianjun; China	142 kg	Luis Javier Mosquera; Colombia	141 kg
Clean & Jerk	Kim Un-guk; North Korea	175 kg	Eko Yuli Irawan; Indonesia	175 kg	Muhammad Hasbi; Indonesia	171 kg
Total	Kim Un-guk; North Korea	325 kg	Eko Yuli Irawan; Indonesia	316 kg	Ding Jianjun; China	312 kg
69 kg
Snatch	Liao Hui; China	166 kg WR	Oleg Chen; Russia	154 kg	Mohamed Ehab; Egypt	152 kg
Clean & Jerk	Liao Hui; China	193 kg	Mohamed Ehab; Egypt	182 kg	Kim Myong-hyok; North Korea	182 kg
Total	Liao Hui; China	359 kg WR	Mohamed Ehab; Egypt	334 kg	Kim Myong-hyok; North Korea	334 kg
77 kg
Snatch	Zhong Guoshun; China	171 kg	Kim Kwang-song; North Korea	163 kg	Petr Asayonak; Belarus	159 kg
Clean & Jerk	Kim Kwang-song; North Korea	200 kg	Zhong Guoshun; China	196 kg	Kirill Pavlov; Kazakhstan	195 kg
Total	Zhong Guoshun; China	367 kg	Kim Kwang-song; North Korea	363 kg	Kirill Pavlov; Kazakhstan	352 kg
85 kg
Snatch	Ivan Markov; Bulgaria	179 kg	Kianoush Rostami; Iran	178 kg	Andrei Rybakou; Belarus	175 kg
Clean & Jerk	Kianoush Rostami; Iran	213 kg	Ulugbek Alimov; Uzbekistan	213 kg	Artem Okulov; Russia	211 kg
Total	Kianoush Rostami; Iran	391 kg	Ivan Markov; Bulgaria	390 kg	Artem Okulov; Russia	385 kg
94 kg
Snatch	Aurimas Didžbalis; Lithuania	185 kg	Zhassulan Kydyrbayev; Kazakhstan	179 kg	Rinat Kireev; Russia	176 kg
Clean & Jerk	Zhassulan Kydyrbayev; Kazakhstan	229 kg	Liu Hao; China	221 kg	Vadzim Straltsou; Belarus	216 kg
Total	Zhassulan Kydyrbayev; Kazakhstan	408 kg	Aurimas Didžbalis; Lithuania	399 kg	Vadzim Straltsou; Belarus	392 kg
105 kg
Snatch	Ruslan Nurudinov; Uzbekistan	193 kg	Yang Zhe; China	191 kg	Ilya Ilyin; Kazakhstan	190 kg
Clean & Jerk	Ilya Ilyin; Kazakhstan	242 kg WR	David Bedzhanyan; Russia	240 kg	Ruslan Nurudinov; Uzbekistan	239 kg
Total	Ilya Ilyin; Kazakhstan	432 kg	Ruslan Nurudinov; Uzbekistan	432 kg	David Bedzhanyan; Russia	427 kg
+105 kg
Snatch	Ruslan Albegov; Russia	210 kg	Behdad Salimi; Iran	206 kg	Yauheni Zharnasek; Belarus	199 kg
Clean & Jerk	Aleksey Lovchev; Russia	257 kg	Ruslan Albegov; Russia	252 kg	Behdad Salimi; Iran	251 kg
Total	Ruslan Albegov; Russia	462 kg	Behdad Salimi; Iran	457 kg	Mohamed Ihsan; Egypt	436 kg

=== Women ===
Event	Gold		Silver		Bronze	
48 kg
Snatch	Tan Yayun; China	85 kg	Sibel Özkan; Turkey	84 kg	Panida Khamsri; Thailand	81 kg
Clean & Jerk	Tan Yayun; China	109 kg	Panida Khamsri; Thailand	108 kg	Sri Wahyuni Agustiani; Indonesia	106 kg
Total	Tan Yayun; China	194 kg	Sibel Özkan; Turkey	189 kg	Panida Khamsri; Thailand	189 kg
53 kg
Snatch	Hsu Shu-ching; Chinese Taipei	99 kg	Zulfiya Chinshanlo; Kazakhstan	98 kg	Li Yajun; China	96 kg
Clean & Jerk	Zulfiya Chinshanlo; Kazakhstan	134 kg WR	Hsu Shu-ching; Chinese Taipei	119 kg	Li Yajun; China	118 kg
Total	Zulfiya Chinshanlo; Kazakhstan	232 kg	Hsu Shu-ching; Chinese Taipei	218 kg	Li Yajun; China	214 kg
58 kg
Snatch	Sukanya Srisurat; Thailand	106 kg	Deng Mengrong; China	105 kg	Yenny Álvarez; Colombia	100 kg
Clean & Jerk	Rattikan Gulnoi; Thailand	131 kg	Deng Mengrong; China	130 kg	Yenny Álvarez; Colombia	125 kg
Total	Deng Mengrong; China	235 kg	Sukanya Srisurat; Thailand	231 kg	Rattikan Gulnoi; Thailand	231 kg
63 kg
Snatch	Karina Goricheva; Kazakhstan	113 kg	Tima Turieva; Russia	112 kg	Lin Tzu-chi; Chinese Taipei	110 kg
Clean & Jerk	Deng Wei; China	142 kg	Choe Hyo-sim; North Korea	140 kg	Tima Turieva; Russia	140 kg
Total	Deng Wei; China	252 kg	Tima Turieva; Russia	252 kg	Choe Hyo-sim; North Korea	248 kg
69 kg
Snatch	Ryo Un-hui; North Korea	120 kg	Chen Youjuan; China	118 kg	Zhazira Zhapparkul; Kazakhstan	118 kg
Clean & Jerk	Ryo Un-hui; North Korea	145 kg	Zhazira Zhapparkul; Kazakhstan	144 kg	Dzina Sazanavets; Belarus	143 kg
Total	Ryo Un-hui; North Korea	265 kg	Zhazira Zhapparkul; Kazakhstan	262 kg	Chen Youjuan; China	261 kg
75 kg
Snatch	Nadezhda Evstyukhina; Russia	126 kg	Kang Yue; China	126 kg	Lydia Valentín; Spain	124 kg
Clean & Jerk	Rim Jong-sim; North Korea	153 kg	Nadezhda Evstyukhina; Russia	153 kg	Kang Yue; China	151 kg
Total	Nadezhda Evstyukhina; Russia	279 kg	Kang Yue; China	277 kg	Rim Jong-sim; North Korea	276 kg
+75 kg
Snatch	Tatiana Kashirina; Russia	155 kg WR	Meng Suping; China	140 kg	Chitchanok Pulsabsakul; Thailand	132 kg
Clean & Jerk	Tatiana Kashirina; Russia	193 kg WR	Meng Suping; China	180 kg	Praeonapa Khenjantuek; Thailand	163 kg
Total	Tatiana Kashirina; Russia	348 kg WR	Meng Suping; China	320 kg	Chitchanok Pulsabsakul; Thailand	294 kg

== Medal table ==
Ranking by Big (Total result) medals

Rank	Nation	Gold	Silver	Bronze	Total
1	China	5	2	4	11
2	North Korea	3	1	3	7
3	Russia	3	1	2	6
4	Kazakhstan	3	1	1	5
5	Iran	1	1	0	2
6	Thailand	0	1	3	4
7	Egypt	0	1	1	2
8	Bulgaria	0	1	0	1
8	Chinese Taipei	0	1	0	1
8	Indonesia	0	1	0	1
8	Lithuania	0	1	0	1
8	Turkey	0	1	0	1
8	Uzbekistan	0	1	0	1
8	Vietnam	0	1	0	1
15	Belarus	0	0	1	1
Totals (15 entries)		15	15	15	45

Ranking by all medals: Big (Total result) and Small (Snatch and Clean & Jerk)

Rank	Nation	Gold	Silver	Bronze	Total
1	China	11	13	9	33
2	North Korea	10	3	4	17
3	Russia	8	6	5	19
4	Kazakhstan	7	4	4	15
5	Iran	2	3	1	6
6	Thailand	2	2	6	10
7	Chinese Taipei	1	2	1	4
7	Uzbekistan	1	2	1	4
9	Vietnam	1	2	0	3
10	Bulgaria	1	1	0	2
10	Lithuania	1	1	0	2
12	Egypt	0	2	2	4
12	Indonesia	0	2	2	4
14	Turkey	0	2	0	2
15	Belarus	0	0	6	6
16	Colombia	0	0	3	3
17	Spain	0	0	1	1
Totals (17 entries)		45	45	45	135

== Team ranking ==
=== Men ===
Rank	Team	Points
1	China	558
2	Russia	443
3	North Korea	420
4	Egypt	390
5	Kazakhstan	382
6	Iran	370

=== Women ===
Rank	Team	Points
1	China	527
2	Thailand	481
3	Russia	454
4	Colombia	395
5	Kazakhstan	345
6	Ukraine	314

== Participating nations ==
A total of 526 competitors from 71 nations participated.

- Albania (9)
- Algeria (6)
- Argentina (1)
- Armenia (14)
- Australia (7)
- Austria (1)
- Azerbaijan (6)
- Belarus (14)
- Belgium (1)
- Brazil (10)
- Bulgaria (8)
- Canada (7)
- Chile (3)
- China (15)
- Chinese Taipei (12)
- Colombia (15)
- Croatia (4)
- Cuba (3)
- Cyprus (1)
- Czech Republic (5)
- Denmark (1)
- Dominican Republic (4)
- Ecuador (10)
- Egypt (13)
- Estonia (4)
- Finland (6)
- France (10)
- Georgia (6)
- Germany (13)
- Great Britain (7)
- Greece (7)
- Hungary (12)
- India (11)
- Indonesia (11)
- Iran (8)
- Ireland (2)
- Israel (2)
- Italy (10)
- Japan (15)
- Kazakhstan (15)
- Kyrgyzstan (4)
- Latvia (2)
- Lebanon (1)
- Libya (1)
- Lithuania (6)
- Malaysia (2)
- Mauritius (2)
- Mexico (5)
- Moldova (9)
- Mongolia (5)
- Netherlands (1)
- North Korea (12)
- Norway (1)
- Poland (13)
- Puerto Rico (1)
- Romania (7)
- Russia (14)
- Saudi Arabia (8)
- Slovakia (5)
- South Korea (11)
- Spain (14)
- Thailand (15)
- Turkey (13)
- Turkmenistan (5)
- Uganda (1)
- Ukraine (13)
- United Arab Emirates (1)
- United States (15)
- Uzbekistan (12)
- Venezuela (13)
- Vietnam (5)
