= Miika Antti-Roiko =

Finnish weightlifter (born 1988)

Miika Antti-Roiko (born 20 November 1988 in Kalajoki, Finland) is a Finnish weightlifter. He competed for Finland at the 2012 Summer Olympics, finishing 19th on Men's 94 kg.
