= Aurimas Didžbalis =

Lithuanian weightlifter (born 1991)

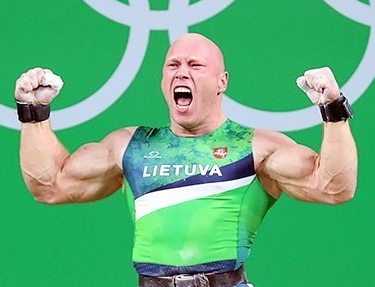
- Aurimas Didžbalis at 2016 Summer Olympics

Personal information
- Born: 13 June 1991 (age 35) Lithuania
- Height: 172 cm (5 ft 8 in)
- Weight: 92 kg (203 lb)

Sport
- Sport: Weightlifting
Medal record
Representing Lithuania
Olympic Games
| Bronze medal – third place | 2016 Rio de Janeiro | –94 kg |
World Championships
| Silver medal – second place | 2014 Almaty | –94 kg |
| Disqualified | 2017 Anaheim | –94 kg |
European Championships
| Gold medal – first place | 2015 Tbilisi | –94 kg |
| Bronze medal – third place | 2011 Kazan | –94 kg |
| Silver medal – second place | 2017 Split | –94 kg |
World U23 Championships
| Gold medal – first place | 2010 | –94 kg |
European U23 Championships
| Gold medal – first place | 2009 | –94 kg |
| Gold medal – first place | 2010 | –94 kg |
Universiade
| Silver medal – second place | 2011 Shenzhen | –94 kg |
European Junior Championships
| Silver medal – second place | 2008 | –94 kg |

Aurimas Didžbalis (born 13 June 1991) is a Lithuanian Olympian weightlifter. He competes in the 94 kg class.

Athlete has been suspended for use of banned substance. The substance was proven to have been included by the manufacturer in a supplement without any warning about it, but athlete's suspension was upheld at a maximum level of 8 years.

In 2014 Didžbalis has become the inaugural weightlifter from Lithuania to win a medal at any World Championships. In 2016, Didžbalis was the inaugural Lithuanian weightlifter medallist in an Olympic Games. He won the Lithuanian Male sportsperson of the year award.

== Results ==
| Year | Event | Result |
|---|---|---|
| 2006 | Lithuanian Youth Championships | 1 |
| 2007 | European U17 Championships | 11 |
| 2008 | Lithuanian Junior Championships | 1 |
| 2008 | Lithuanian Championships | 2 |
| 2008 | European Junior Championships | 2 |
| 2009 | European U23 Championships | 1 |
| 2009 | World U23 Championships | 10 |
| 2010 | European U23 Championships | 1 |
| 2010 | World U23 Championships | 1 |
| 2010 | World Championships | 7 |
| 2011 | European Championships | 3 |
| 2011 | Universiade | 2 |
| 2011 | World Championships | 10 |
| 2014 | Lithuanian Championships | 1 |
| 2014 | World Championships | 3 |
| 2015 | European Championships | 1 |
| 2016 | Olympic Games | 3 |
| 2017 | European Championships | 3 |
| 2017 | World Championships | DSQ |
