= Snatch (weightlifting) =

Term in the sport of weightlifting

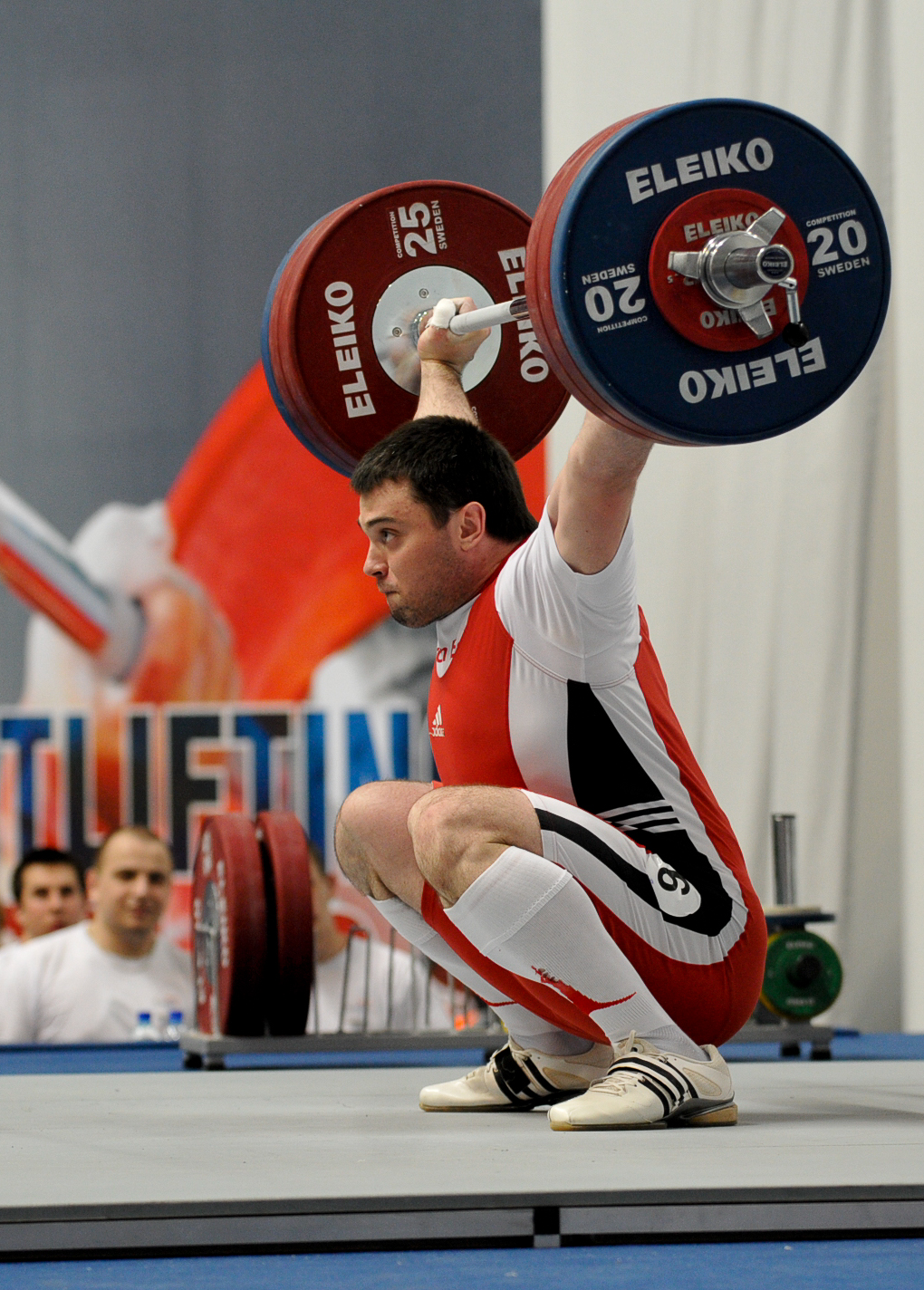
A snatch being performed in competition

The snatch is the first of two lifts contested in the sport of weightlifting (also known as Olympic weightlifting) followed by the clean and jerk. The objective of the snatch is to lift the barbell from the ground to overhead in one continuous motion. There are four main styles of snatch used: snatch (full snatch or squat snatch), split snatch, power snatch, and muscle snatch. The full lift is the most common style used in competition, while power snatches and muscle snatches are mostly used for training purposes, and split snatches are now rarely used. Any of these lifts can be performed from the floor, from the hang position, or from blocks. In competition, only lifts from the floor are allowed.

== Types ==
=== Full snatch ===
The snatch is now commonly used to mean a full snatch, also called a squat snatch. Before WWII, the squat style was performed mainly by German lifters, while the rest of the world preferred the split snatch because the squat style required great precision and balance and was also considered precarious. It has, however, the advantage of allowing the lifter to catch the weight at a lower position, therefore potentially lift heavier weights. Larry Barnholth with his brother Lewis developed a more stable and reliable form of squat snatch after observing the German squat style in the late 1930s. It has since become the most common form of the snatch.

In full snatch, the lifter lifts the bar as high as possible and pulls themselves under it in a squat position, receiving the bar overhead with the arms straight, decreasing the necessary height of the bar, therefore increasing the amount of weight that the lifter may successfully lift. The lifter finally straightens to a fully upright position with the bar above their head and arms fully extended.

=== Split snatch ===
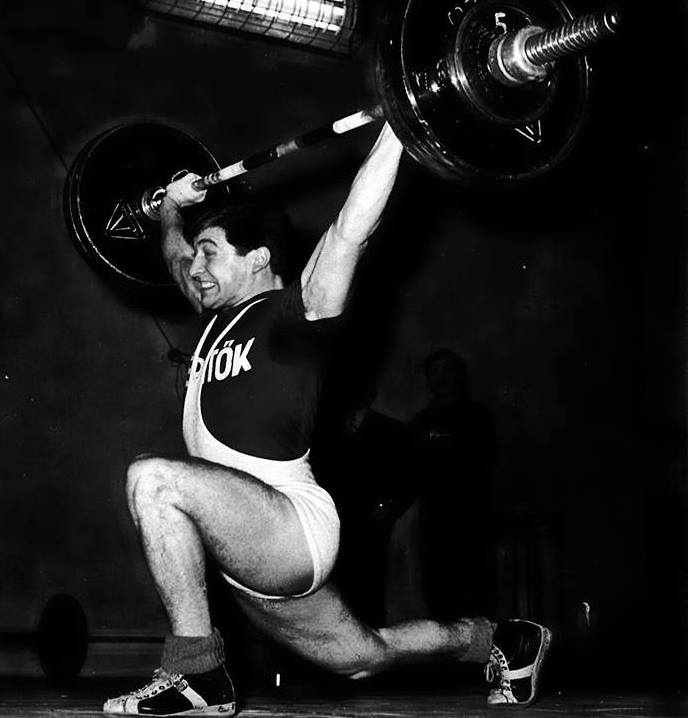
A split snatch being performed

Split snatch was the common form of snatch before squat snatch was popularized by lifters such as Pete George and Dave Sheppard. In the split snatch, the lifter lifts the bar as high as possible and pulls themselves under the bar similar to the squat snatch but in the split snatch the lifter "splits" their legs, placing one foot in front of them and one behind, allowing themselves to receive the bar in a low position. The split snatch is now uncommon but is still occasionally performed by some lifters. Most lifters prefer the squat style over the split because the bar needed to be pulled higher and longer in the split style, and they can go lower in the squat.

=== Power snatch ===
In the power snatch, the lifter lifts the barbell as high as possible and receives the bar overhead with only a slight bend in the knee and hip, increasing the height that the bar must be lifted and decreasing the amount of weight that may be successfully lifted. It is the most basic version of the snatch, and simpler for beginners and those with limited mobility to learn, but may also be used by advanced lifters to train for specific purposes such as explosiveness in the pull.

=== Muscle snatch ===
In the muscle snatch, the lifter lifts the bar all the way overhead with the arms locked out and the hips and knees fully extended, with no re-bend of the knees after the hips reach full extension. It is often used as a training exercise to reinforce upper body strength and positioning in the full snatch.

=== One-handed snatch ===
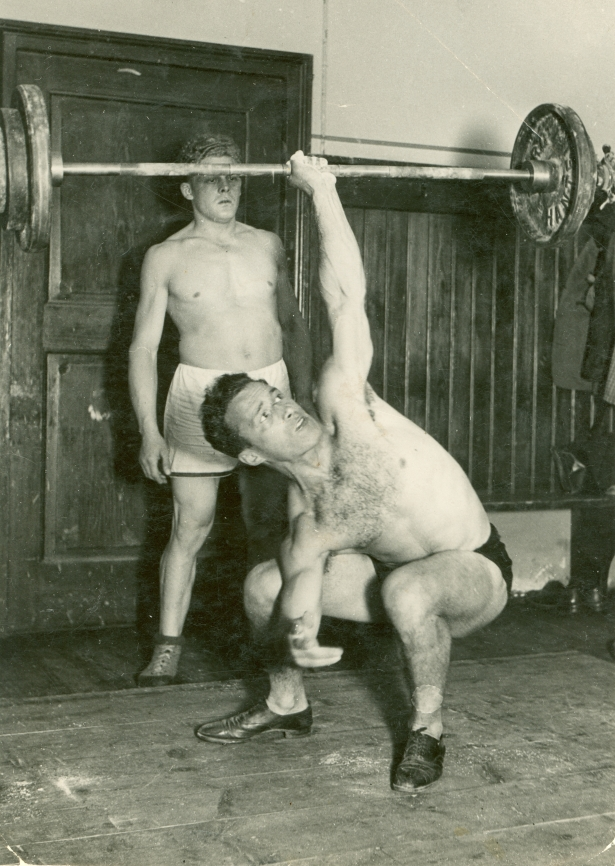
One-handed lift

The snatch can be performed with one hand. A dumbbell or kettlebell is most commonly used although a barbell can also be used. As a unilateral movement, the one-handed snatch can help to counteract asymmetrical muscle development that can occur when only bilateral movements are performed i.e. in a bilateral movement a stronger limb may perform an excessively large amount of the overall work, and the weaker limb an excessively small amount. By performing one-handed snatches alternately, each arm is performing the same amount of work and any excessive strength imbalance may be avoided or evened out in this manner.

== Technique ==

While the snatch is commonly referred to in three phases, Arthur Drechsler identifies six distinct phases of the pull in the snatch.

=== First phase ===
The lifter begins the first phase of the pull or "Pre-lift off", with the feet placed approximately hip width apart, toes turned out slightly with the bar above the midfoot. The shins will be inclined toward the bar so that the shin is touching or close to the bar. Hips are placed so that the top of the thigh is approximately parallel to the ground but may also be slightly higher or lower depending on the lifter. The lifter’s back should be straight, no excessive curvature or rounding in the lumbar spine, with slight extension of the thoracic spine and shoulders slightly pulled back. The shoulders should be positioned so that they are directly over or slightly forward of the bar. The bar is gripped with a very wide grip. The neck should be positioned in line with the torso or slightly more vertical. During the first pull, the lifter begins to exert force on the bar, separating the weight from the platform.

=== Second phase ===
The second phase of the pull, or "preliminary acceleration" begins with the weight separated from the floor. In the second phase, the lifter begins by extending the knee and moving the hip upward while maintaining a constant back angle relative to the floor. During this phase, the lifter pulls the bar closer to their body and the center of gravity of the lifter shifts toward the heel. During this phase, the lifter begins to accelerate the bar and towards the end of the phase, the torso begins to assume a more vertical position.

=== Third phase ===
During the third phase, or "adjustment phase", the lifter begins to position their body appropriately for the final explosive pull. The knees typically perform a "double knee bend", where the knee bends from the previous extension of the knee during the second phase, and the torso continues to become more vertical. During this phase, the lifter doesn't apply as great a force on the bar as in the previous phases.

=== Fourth phase ===
During the fourth phase of the pull, or "final acceleration" the lifter performs the final acceleration on the bar. This is executed by explosively extending the hip, knee, and ankles (or plantar-flexing). This is followed by an upward elevation of the shoulders (the "shrug"), and simultaneously lifting the heels or the whole foot off the ground. The lifter’s torso will usually lean slightly backwards during this phase, and the bar is accelerated upward with a slightly arced trajectory.

=== Fifth phase ===
The fifth phase of the pull, or "unsupported squat phase", occurs when the lifter has fully extended their knees, hips, and ankle. The lifter bends their arms at the elbow, pulling themselves under the bar. Simultaneously they move their feet slightly apart into the squat position and begins to move downward into the squat position.

=== Sixth phase ===
The sixth phase, or supported squat under, occurs when the lifters feet have landed flatfooted on the platform and the lifter pulls themselves into a squat position. The lifter then receives the bar overhead with the arms completely straight. From this position, the lifter recovers by squatting the weight to a fully erect position while maintaining the bar position overhead.

== Application to other sports ==
The snatch is also commonly used as a tool for training athletes in a variety of sports especially with athletes in sports where powerful full body movement is required such as throwing, sprinting, running, and jumping. The triple-extension in the snatch (simultaneous extension of the knee and hip, and plantar flexion at the ankle) mimics the movements previously mentioned while requiring the athlete to produce large amounts of power at high velocities. The snatch has an average velocity of 1.52–1.67 m/s. This makes it a quality lift for training speed-strength in which the athlete aims to move a light weight (25–40% 1RM) at its fastest velocity (1.1–1.65 m/s)

== World records ==
These are the official records in the new weight classes:

=== Men ===
Weight class	Name	Lift
55 kg	World standard	135 kg (298 lb)
61 kg	Li Fabin	146 kg (322 lb)
67 kg	Huang Minhao	155 kg (342 lb)
73 kg	Shi Zhiyong	169 kg (373 lb)
81 kg	Li Dayin	175 kg (386 lb)
89 kg	Karlos Nasar	188 kg (414 lb)
96 kg	Lesman Paredes	187 kg (412 lb)
102 kg	World standard	191 kg (421 lb)
109 kg	Yang Zhe	200 kg (440 lb)
109+ kg	Lasha Talakhadze	225 kg (496 lb)

=== Women ===
Weight class	Name	Lift
45 kg	Won Hyon Sim	87 kg (192 lb)
49 kg	Hou Zhihui	97 kg (214 lb)
55 kg	Kang Hyon Gyong	104 kg (229 lb)
59 kg	Kim Il-gyong	111 kg (245 lb)
64 kg	Deng Wei	117 kg (258 lb)
71 kg	Angie Palacios	121 kg (267 lb)
76 kg	Rim Jong-sim	124 kg (273 lb)
81 kg	World standard	127 kg (280 lb)
87 kg	World standard	132 kg (291 lb)
87+ kg	Li Wenwen	148 kg (326 lb)

== See also ==
- Clean and press
