= Liu Hao (weightlifter) =

Chinese weightlifter (born 1989)

Liu Hao (born 20 July 1989) is a Chinese weightlifter. He won the gold medal in Weightlifting at the 2014 Asian Games.
